= 2014–15 Kategoria e Parë =

Kategoria e Parë
- Season: 2014–15
- Champions: Bylis
- Promoted: Bylis; Tërbuni
- Relegated: Veleçiku; Naftëtari; Tomori
- Matches: 273
- Goals: 666 (2.44 per match)
- Top goalscorer: Cate Fonseca (17); Jasmin Raboshta (17)
- Biggest home win: Bylis 10–0 Tomori (18 April 2015); Adriatiku 10–0 Veleçiku (25 April 2015)
- Biggest away win: Ada 0–7 Tërbuni (21 February 2015)
- Highest scoring: Bylis 10–0 Tomori (18 April 2015); Adriatiku 10–0 Veleçiku (25 April 2015); Ada 4–6 Adriatiku (25 April 2015)
- Longest winning run: Tërbuni (8); Adriatiku (8)
- Longest unbeaten run: Tërbuni (27)
- Longest winless run: Veleçiku (23)
- Longest losing run: Veleçiku (9)

The 2014–15 Kategoria e Parë is being competed between 20 teams in 2 groups, A and B, respectively.

== Changes from last season ==
=== Team changes ===
==== From Kategoria e Parë ====
Promoted to Kategoria Superiore:

- Elbasani
- Apolonia

Relegated to Kategoria e Dytë:

- Albpetrol
- Himara

==== To Kategoria e Parë ====
Relegated from Kategoria Superiore:

- Bylis
- Lushnja
- Kastrioti
- Besa

Promoted from Kategoria e Dytë:

- Iliria
- Besëlidhja
- Sopoti
- Naftëtari

=== Stadia by capacity and locations ===
==== Group A ====
Team	Location	Stadium	Capacity
Ada	Velipojë	Fusha Sportive Adriatik	1,000
Besa	Kavajë	Besa Stadium	8,000
Besëlidhja	Lezhë	Brian Filipi Stadium	5,000
Burreli	Burrel	Liri Ballabani Stadium	2,500
Iliria	Fushë-Krujë	Redi Maloku Stadium	3,000
Kamza	Kamëz	Kamëz Stadium	5,500
Kastrioti	Krujë	Kastrioti Stadium	10,000
Adriatiku	Mamurras	Mamurras Stadium	1,000
Tërbuni	Pukë	Ismail Xhemali Stadium	1,950
Veleçiku	Koplik	Kompleksi Vellezërit Duli	2,000

==== Group B ====
Team	Location	Stadium	Capacity
Butrinti	Sarandë	Butrinti Stadium	5,500
Bylis	Ballsh	Adush Muça Stadium	5,200
Dinamo Tirana	Tirana	Selman Stërmasi Stadium	12,500
Luftëtari	Gjirokastër	Gjirokastër Stadium	8,400
Lushnja	Lushnjë	Abdurrahman Roza Haxhiu Stadium	8,500
Naftëtari	Kuçovë	Bashkim Sulejmani Stadium	5,000
Pogradeci	Pogradec	Gjorgji Kyçyku Stadium	8,000
Shkumbini	Peqin	Shkumbini Stadium	5,000
Sopoti	Librazhd	Sopoti Stadium	3,000
Tomori	Berat	Tomori Stadium	14,500

== League table ==
=== Group A ===
Pos	Team	Pld	W	D	L	GF	GA	GD	Pts	Promotion or relegation
1	Tërbuni (P)	27	21	6	0	55	12	+43	69	Promotion to 2015–16 Kategoria Superiore
2	Besëlidhja	27	21	2	4	56	13	+43	65	
3	Adriatiku	27	20	4	3	57	16	+41	64	
4	Iliria	27	9	6	12	25	25	0	33	
5	Kastrioti	27	9	4	14	33	36	−3	31	
6	Burreli	27	10	1	16	38	45	−7	31	
7	Kamza	27	9	4	14	30	47	−17	31	
8	Ada	27	8	3	16	31	57	−26	27	
9	Besa (O)	27	5	8	14	25	45	−20	23	Play-out relegation to 2015–16 Kategoria e Dytë
10	Veleçiku (R)	27	3	2	22	23	77	−54	8 (Note: Veleçiku were deducted three points.)	Relegation to 2015–16 Kategoria e Dytë

Source: Soccerway
Rules for classification: 1) points; 2) goal difference; 3) number of goals scored; 4) head-to-head points; 5) head-to-head goal difference; 6) draw. (Head-to-head record is applied for clubs with the same number of points only once all matches between said clubs have been played.)
(O) Play-off winners; (P) Promoted; (R) Relegated

=== Group B ===
Pos	Team	Pld	W	D	L	GF	GA	GD	Pts	Promotion or relegation
1	Bylis (C, P)	27	17	2	8	46	26	+20	53	Promotion to 2015–16 Kategoria Superiore
2	Lushnja	27	16	5	6	36	18	+18	53	
3	Butrinti	27	11	8	8	34	22	+12	41	
4	Sopoti	27	10	6	11	31	34	−3	36	
5	Luftëtari	27	10	4	13	24	29	−5	34	
6	Dinamo Tirana	27	9	9	9	27	26	+1	33 (Note: Dinamo Tirana were deducted three points.)	
7	Shkumbini	27	8	7	12	29	33	−4	31	
8	Pogradeci	27	8	7	12	21	29	−8	31	
9	Tomori (R)	27	9	5	13	21	38	−17	29 (Note: Tomori were deducted three points.)	Play-out relegation to 2015–16 Kategoria e Dytë
10	Naftëtari (R)	27	4	13	10	18	32	−14	25	Relegation to 2015–16 Kategoria e Dytë

Source: Soccerway
Rules for classification: 1) points; 2) goal difference; 3) number of goals scored; 4) head-to-head points; 5) head-to-head goal difference; 6) draw. (Head-to-head record is applied for clubs with the same number of points only once all matches between said clubs have been played.)
(C) Champions; (P) Promoted; (R) Relegated

== Final ==
23 May 2015
17:00 CEST

Bylis	2–0	Tërbuni
Mustafaraj 59'; Dhrami 90+3'	Report

Elbasan Arena, Elbasan
Referee: Olsi Sokoli

== Relegation play-offs ==
Besa Kavajë as the 9th–placed Group A side faced the 2nd–placed 2014–15 Kategoria e Dytë Group A side at the Niko Dovana Stadium in Durrës. Tomori Berat as the 9th–placed Group B side faced the 2nd–placed 2014–15 Kategoria e Dytë Group B side at the Qemal Stafa Stadium in Tirana.

20 May 2015
17:00 CEST

Besa	3–0 (awarded)	Turbina
S.Celhaka 47'; A.Sallaku 54'	Report

Niko Dovana Stadium, Durrës
Attendance: 1,031
Referee: Lorenc Jemini

20 May 2015
17:00 CEST

Tomori	0–1	Erzeni
	Report	Pasha 87'

Qemal Stafa Stadium, Tirana
Attendance: 2,000
Referee: Kridens Meta

== Season statistics ==
=== Scoring ===
==== Top scorers ====
As of 22 May 2015

Rank	Player	Team	Goals
1	(Brazil) Cate Fonseca	Adriatiku	17
1	(Albania) Jasmin Raboshta	Butrinti	17
3	(Albania) Julian Malo	Besëlidhja	16
4	(Albania) Mikel Canka	Lushnja	15
4	(Albania) Bedri Greca	Tërbuni	15
6	(Albania) Arlind Pirani	Burreli	12
7	(Albania) Brunild Pepa	Bylis	10
8	(Albania) Artur Magani	Shkumbini	9
8	(Albania) Enkelejd Pengu	Pogradeci	9
10	(Albania) Endri Bakiu	Kastrioti	8
10	(Albania) Arsen Zylyftari	Naftëtari	8
12	(Serbia) Kosta Bajić	Besëlidhja	7
12	(Canada) Arlind Ferhati	Ada	7
12	(Albania) Erlis Frashëri	Luftëtari	7
12	(Albania) Gazmir Kurtaj	Veleçiku	7
12	(Albania) Endri Lala	Adriatiku	7
12	(Albania) Senad Lekaj	Tërbuni	7
12	(Albania) Taulant Marku	Tërbuni	7
12	(Albania) Edison Puka	Burreli	7

== Foreign players ==
Nationality	Player	Team
Canada	Arlind Ferhati	Ada Velipojë
Kosovo	Pleurat Hajdini	Besa Kavajë
Serbia	Milan Djordjevic	Besëlidhja Lezhë
Serbia	Bojan Ušumović	Besëlidhja Lezhë
Serbia	Kosta Bajić	Besëlidhja Lezhë
Kosovo	Allush Gavazaj	Bylis Ballsh
Brazil	Leandro Santos	KS Burreli/Naftëtari Kuçovë
Brazil	Julio Cesar	KS Burreli
Brazil	Nilton de Paula	Naftëtari Kuçovë
Nigeria	Felix Udoh	KS Kamza/Adriatiku Mamurras
Nigeria	Joseph Olatunji	KS Kamza
Nigeria	Kehinde Owoeye	Kastrioti Krujë
Nigeria	Abraham Alechenwu	Adriatiku Mamurras
Brazil	Denis da Silva	Adriatiku Mamurras
Brazil	Cate Fonseca	Adriatiku Mamurras
Brazil	Leo Carioca	Adriatiku Mamurras
Montenegro	Miroslav Kaluđerović	Tërbuni Pukë
Montenegro	Vladan Giljen	Tërbuni Pukë
Montenegro	Enis Djokovic	Tërbuni Pukë
Croatia	Matko Djarmati	Tërbuni Pukë
Nigeria	Gabriel Steven	Tërbuni Pukë/Kastrioti Krujë
Brazil	Pericles	Sopoti Librazhd
England	Bekim Iliazi	Sopoti Librazhd
Bulgaria	Ferdi Myumyunov	Sopoti Librazhd
Nigeria	Charles Ofoyen	Sopoti Librazhd
