= Bekim =

Bekim is an Albanian masculine given name, which means blessing. Notable people named Bekim include:

- Bekim Babić (born 1975), Bosnia and Herzegovina cross-country skier
- Bekim Balaj (born 1991), Albanian footballer
- Bekim Bejta (born 1970), Kosovar Albanian linguist, poet and translator
- Bekim Berisha (1966–1998), Kosovar Albanian soldier
- Bekim Christensen (born 1973), Danish road bicycle racer
- Bekim Çollaku, former minister of European Integration of Kosovo
- Bekim Dema (born 1993), Albanian footballer
- Bekim Erkoceviç (born 1992), Albanian footballer
- Bekim Fehmiu (1936–2010), Yugoslavian theater and film actor of Albanian origin
- Bekim Halilaj, Albanian businessman, president of Luftëtari FC
- Bekim Iliazi (born 1993), Albanian footballer
- Bekim Isufi (born 1976), Kosovar footballer and coach
- Bekim Jashari (born 1975), Kosovo Albanian politician, mayor of Skenderaj since 2017
- Bekim Kapič (born 1979), Slovenian footballer
- Bekim Kastrati (born 1979), Albanian footballer
- Bekim Kuli (born 1982), Albanian footballer
