= Albania national football team =

Men's national football team

Albania
- Nickname(s): Kuqezinjtë (The Red and Blacks)
- Association: Federata Shqiptare e Futbollit (FSHF)
- Confederation: UEFA (Europe)
- Head coach: Rolando Maran
- Captain: Berat Gjimshiti
- Most caps: Elseid Hysaj (105)
- Top scorer: Erjon Bogdani (18)
- Home stadium: Arena Kombëtare
- FIFA code: ALB
First colours	Second colours	Third colours

FIFA ranking
- Current: 65 ▲1 (18 November 2026)
- Highest: 22 (August 2015)
- Lowest: 124 (August 1997)

First international
- Albania 2–3 Yugoslavia (Tirana, Albania; 7 October 1946)

Biggest win
- Albania 5–0 Vietnam (Bastia Umbra, Italy; 12 February 2003); Albania 6–1 Cyprus (Tirana, Albania; 12 August 2009); Albania 5–0 San Marino (Elbasan, Albania; 8 September 2021)

Biggest defeat
- Hungary 12–0 Albania (Budapest, Hungary; 24 September 1950)

European Championship
- Appearances: 2 (first in 2016)
- Best result: Group stage (2016, 2024)
Medal record
Men's football
Balkan Cup
Gold medal – first place	1946 Albania	Team
Malta "Rothmans" International Tournament
Gold medal – first place	2000 Malta	Team
Bronze medal – third place	1998 Malta	Team

The Albania national football team (Albanian: Kombëtarja shqiptare e futbollit) represents Albania in men's international football. It is governed by the Albanian Football Federation (FSHF), the governing body for football in Albania. It is a member of UEFA in Europe and FIFA in global competitions. The team's colours reference two national symbols: the double-headed eagle and the country's bicolor. Their supporters are colloquially referred to as the Tifozat Kuq e Zi (Red and Black Fans).

Since its inception as a team, Albania first collected a major tournament trophy in 1946 with the Balkan Cup, followed by the Malta International Tournament (2000). At the FIFA World Cup, Albania has campaigned to qualify since their entry into FIFA in 1932. The team has reached the group stage of UEFA European Championship twice (2016, 2024). They have competed in the UEFA Nations League since 2018.

Upon its admission into FIFA ranked 124th, Albania ascended to their peak World Ranking of 22nd in 2015. The country plays their home games in the Arena Kombëtare in their capital city, Tirana.

== History ==
=== 20th century ===
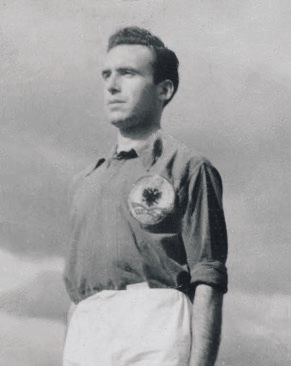
Loro Boriçi captained the national team in winning the 1946 Balkan Cup.

Although it never played any matches, the Albania national football team existed before the Albanian Football Federation (Federata Shqiptare e Futbollit; FSHF) was created on 6 June 1930. Albania joined FIFA during a congress held between 12 and 16 June. Albania was invited to play in the 1934 World Cup, but did not take part due to logistical problems. Albania played its first international match against Yugoslavia in 1946, which ended in a 3–2 home defeat at Qemal Stafa Stadium. In 1946, Albania also participated for the first time in the Balkan Cup in which Albania won by beating Romania 1–0 in the final. In 1954, Albania was one of the founding members of UEFA. Albania waited until 1962 to compete for the first time in a UEFA Euro Cup competition, and the reason being Albania got past the first leg against Greece, for political reasons forfeited the game winning twice 0-3 and 3-0 and in Total 6–0 on Aggregate, to qualify so for the first and only time so far, for the Round of 16 in a UEFA competition. At the end of the tournament Albania ranked 9th in Europe. Albania participated at the 1964 Summer Olympics in the Men's qualification tournament, and closely lost both matches against Bulgaria in the preliminary round. They would participate for the second and last time at the 1972 Summer Olympics in which they faced Romania at the European qualifiers in the playoffs. Albania would lose both matches narrowly, 2–1 in the first leg and at home in the second leg.

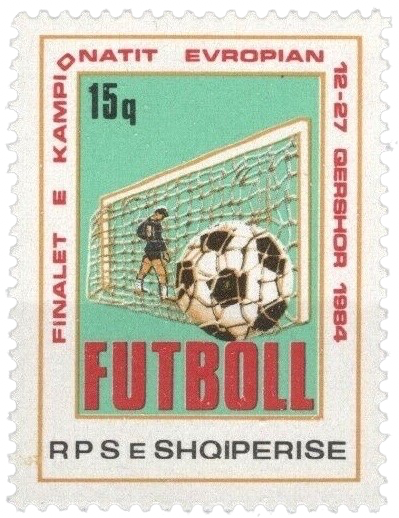
Albanian stamp honouring Euro 1984.

Albania participated for the first time in a qualifying phase of a World Cup in 1966. The team was drawn in the Group 5, finishing in the last position with only one point from six matches. In the qualifiers of UEFA Euro 1968, Albania drew 0–0 against West Germany, denying the Germans a chance to participate in the finals. Albania did not participate in World Cup 1970, UEFA Euro 1976, World Cup 1978 and UEFA Euro 1980 qualifying for unknown political reasons.

After six years without playing any international matches, Albania entered the 1982 World Cup, managing to finish second-to-last in the qualifying stages. For qualifying for the World Cup four years later, Albania beat Belgium in Tirana 2–0 as well as drawing Poland in Mielec 2–2.

=== 21st century ===
In the 2002 World Cup qualifiers, Albania only beat Greece. For the Euros two years later, Albania beat Russia 3–1 at Loro Boriçi Stadium. This match was also the debut of the German coach Hans-Peter Briegel who led Albania to an undefeated run in home matches. Despite good results, Albania finished in the penultimate spot with only eight points. Albania defeated Greece 2–1 two months after they won Euro 2004.

In Euro 2008 qualifying, Albania defeated Luxembourg twice, and also drew 2–2 with Belarus and 0–0 away with Bulgaria. Albania's Euro campaign ended with a 6–1 loss away to Romania which resulted in the resignation of coach Otto Barić and his assistant. In December 2007, Arie Haan was named Albania's head coach by signing a two-year contract for the 2010 World Cup qualifiers. Albania won only one match, with seven points from ten matches and Haan was replaced by Josip Kuže in May 2009 following the end of the campaign. However, Kuže failed to lead Albania to better results as the team ended the Euro 2012 qualifying with nine points from ten matches. With Kuže in charge, Albania recorded its second biggest win in history by defeating Cyprus 6–1 at home. Josip Kuže parted ways with Albania after three and a half years, and in December 2011, Italian coach Gianni de Biasi replaced him. Albania was, at one point, second in the 2014 World Cup qualifying group, but then lost to Slovenia and Iceland, as well as at home against Switzerland, and drawing in Cyprus.

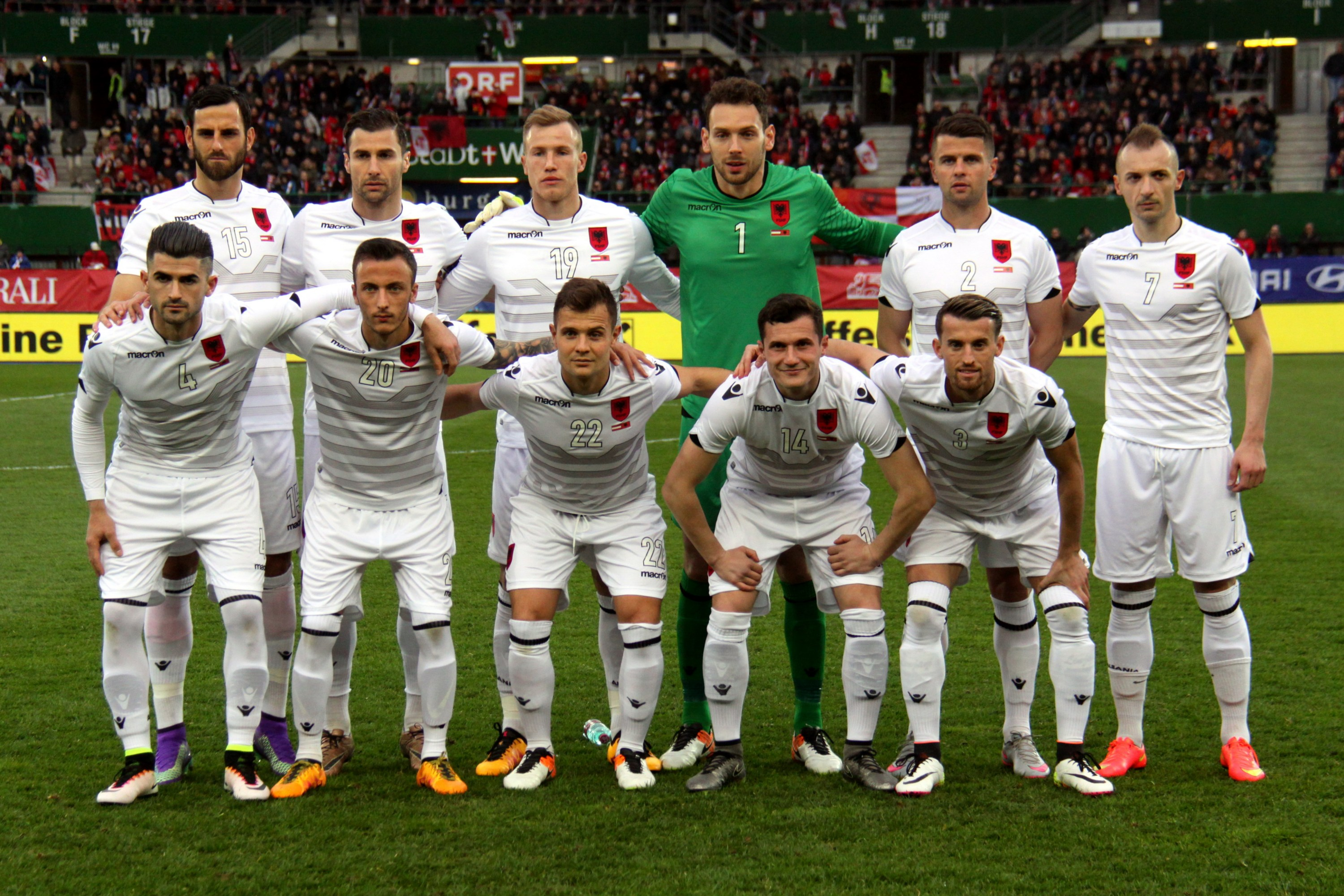
Albania squad wearing the visitors' uniform, 2016.

Albania began UEFA Euro 2016 qualifying Group I with an emphatic 1–0 away win against Portugal, followed by a 1–1 draw against Denmark at the newly renovated Elbasan Arena. They then beat Serbia 3–0 in a match full of incidents. They finally qualified for a UEFA European Championship after beating Armenia in Yerevan 0–3, its first appearance in the country's history at a major men's football tournament.

Pos	Team	Pld	W	D	L	GF	GA	GD	Pts	Qualification
1	Portugal	8	7	0	1	11	5	+6	21	Qualify for final tournament
2	Albania	8	4	2	2	10	5	+5	14	Qualify for final tournament
3	Denmark	8	3	3	2	8	5	+3	12	Advance to play-offs
4	Serbia (Note: The Serbia v Albania match was awarded as a 3–0 win to Albania, and Serbia were also deducted three points, after the match was abandoned at 0–0 because home fans invaded the pitch and attacked Albania players when a drone carried a pro-Albanian flag over the stadium.)	8	2	1	5	8	13	−5	4	
5	Armenia	8	0	2	6	5	14	−9	2	

Source: UEFA
Rules for classification: Qualification tiebreakers
Notes:

In the tournament itself, Albania lost 1–0 to Switzerland to an early header in the 5th Minute from Fabian Schär despite being one man down to a Red Card for Lorik Cana Albania held its ground as they came close to an equalizer as Shkëlzen Gashi as he missed an sitter in front of goalie Yann Sommer. In the following match they lost 2–0 to the hosts France despite an close fought match being able to defend against the favourites until the last minutes conceding two goals from Dimitri Payet and Griezmann. While they beat in the third Group match Romania 1–0 by a header scored from Armando Sadiku before halftime, securing Albania's first ever win in a UEFA European Championship. The team finished last among the third-placed teams and were eliminated in the group stage.

In 2018 World Cup qualification, Albania was drawn in a group with Spain, Italy, Liechtenstein, Macedonia, and Israel. Despite the difficult draw, they placed third in the group, their best result in history without qualifying for the final tournament. During this time, manager Gianni De Biasi resigned after disputes with the FSHF and was replaced by Christian Panucci. Albania played poorly in the 2018–19 UEFA Nations League, winning only once against Israel and losing the return leg as well as both matches against Scotland. Panucci would be sacked after a 2–0 defeat to Turkey in the opening match of UEFA Euro 2020 qualifying. Edoardo Reja replaced Panucci as Albania faced home and away series against both 2018 FIFA World Cup champions France and Iceland as well as the return leg against Turkey. In the end, Albania placed fourth in the group, failing to qualify.

After narrowly missing out on qualification for the 2022 FIFA World Cup in Qatar, finishing third in Group I, Albania were drawn in UEFA Euro 2024 qualifying Group E alongside the Czech Republic, Poland, Faroe Islands and Moldova. Albania went unbeaten in the qualifying campaign and secured qualification for the UEFA Euro 2024, marking their second appearance at a UEFA European Championship.

At UEFA Euro 2024, Albania were drawn into a "group of death" alongside Spain, Italy and Croatia, all of whom are European and World Cup medalists. After losses to Spain and Italy and a 2–2 draw against Croatia, Albania finished bottom of the group and were eliminated in the group stage.

Albania competed in the 2024–25 UEFA Nations League B, where they finished bottom of their group and were relegated to League C. They subsequently participated in the 2026 FIFA World Cup qualification, finishing second in Group K with four wins without conceding, two draws, and two defeats against England, thereby securing qualification to the play-off stage for the first time in their history. In the play-off, Albania was eliminated following a 2–1 defeat to Poland, despite initially taking the lead.

== Team image ==
=== Nicknames ===
The team's nickname is commonly known as "Kuqezinjtë" ("The Red and Blacks") During the period before 2016, the national teams of Albania and Kosovo exchanged players with each other due to the complexities of descent brought on by Kosovo's independence, leading supporters to refer to each team as the other team's "reserve" side.

=== Kits ===
Albania's uniform colors are red and black, mirroring the nation's flag. The team typically wears red shirts, black shorts and red socks. Away kits are usually all-white, with red and black trimming.

Over the years, the national team has sported kit wear from renowned sportswear brands such as Legea, Puma, Nike and Adidas, to name a few. The partnership with Puma began in 1996 and lasted nine years. Nike outfitted the team during the UEFA Euro 2008 and the 2010 World Cup qualifiers. A collaboration with Adidas followed, in a contract signing which allowed it to manufacture kits for the Euro 2012 qualifiers, as well as the 2014 World Cup and the Euro 2016 qualifiers.

On 24 March 2016, the Albanian Football Federation unveiled a New Jersey for the national team players, set to be worn during the forthcoming UEFA Euro 2016 tournament, hosted that year in France. Manufactured by Macron, the jersey redesign, labelled "Triumfi," was conceptualised by Tirana-based studio PIK Creative.

				Kit wear suppliers
(Germany); Adidas (1988)	(England); Umbro (1992–93)	(Germany); Uhlsport (1994–95)	(Germany); Puma (1996–04)	(England); Umbro (2004–07)	(United States); Nike (2008–10)	(Italy); Legea (2010–12)	(Germany); Adidas (2012–16)	(Italy); Macron (2016–27)

=== Home stadium ===
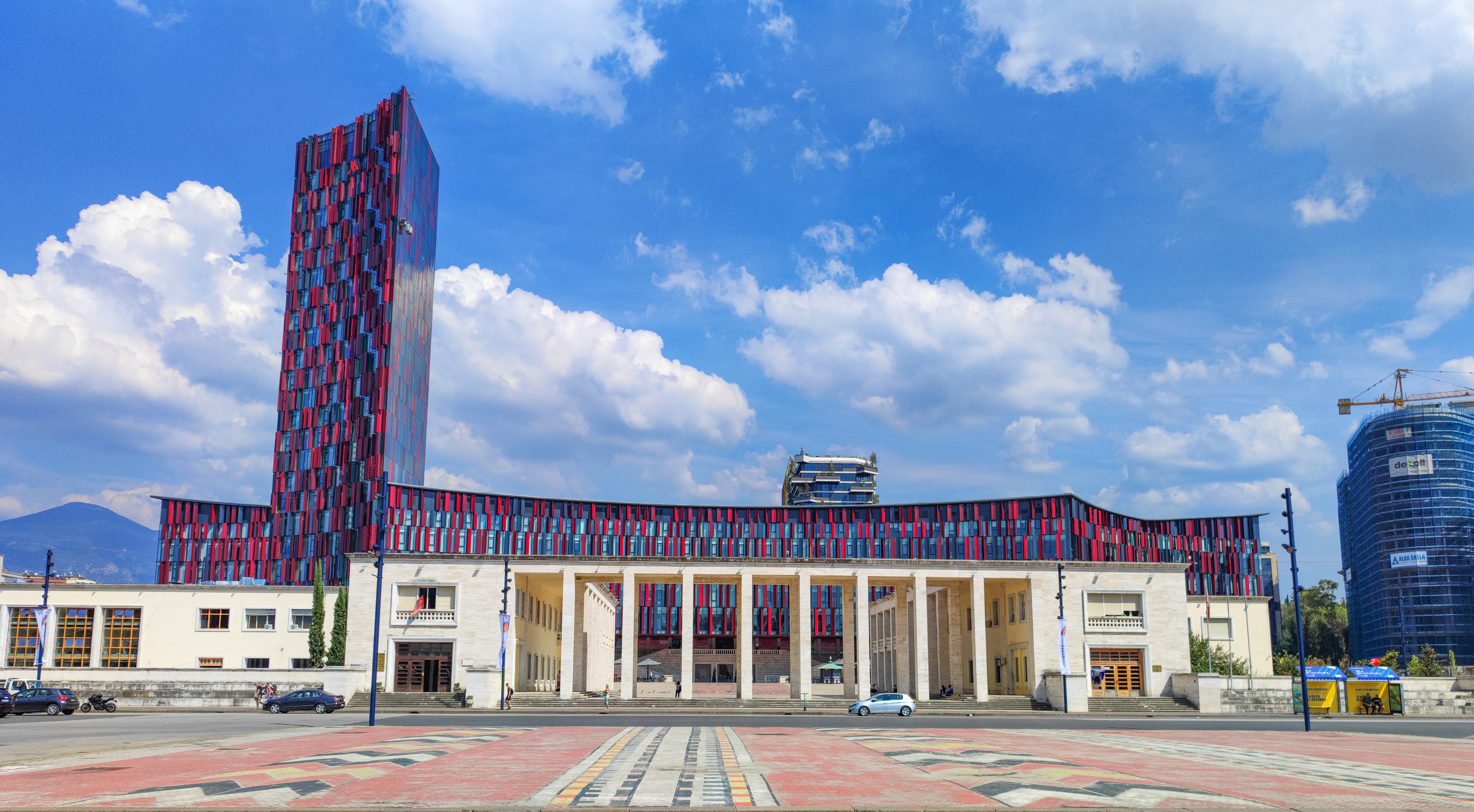
Arena Kombëtare is the home ground of the national team.

For most of Albania's history, the home stadium was Qemal Stafa Stadium in Tirana. Construction started in April 1939 during the Italy regime, lasted for three years but stopped briefly in August 1943 following the fall of fascist regime. The stadium had an Olympic Stadium shape, as idealised by Gherardo Bosio, a young fascist architect from Florence. The stadium's initial capacity was 15,000, due to the fact that Tirana at that time had only 60,000 inhabitants. It was named after Qemal Stafa, a Hero of Albania in World War II. The stadium was inaugurated officially on 7 October 1946 when Albania played its first competitive match against Yugoslavia. Ever since then, a further 130 international matches took place in the stadium, with the last being a friendly against Georgia in November 2015. In 2005, Cecilia de Marco and Elisabetta Lorusso, two young Italian students, called the stadium as "one of the strongest symbols of Italian impact in Albania". In November 2013, Qemal Stafa Stadium was shut down by FIFA for not fulfilling international standards. The stadium's demolition started in June 2016, and it was announced that it would be replaced by Arena Kombëtare.

Albania has played home matches at other venues; outside Tirana, the national team has played matches in Flamurtari Stadium in Vlorë, Tomori Stadium in Berat, Niko Dovana Stadium in Durrës, Loro Boriçi Stadium in Shkodër and Elbasan Arena in Elbasan. In February 2014, renovations for Elbasan Arena (at the time Ruzhdi Bizhuta Stadium) started. The work lasted for seven months, and the stadium was inaugurated on 9 October when Albania played a friendly match against KF Elbasani's under-19 squad; Albania won the match 17–0. The official inauguration occurred two days later in the Euro 2016 qualifying match against Denmark.

The first international match at Loro Boriçi Stadium was played on 29 March 2003 against Russia, with Albania winning 3–1. In October 2014, Prime Minister of Albania, Edi Rama, promised the reconstruction of the stadium. The stadium's construction started in May 2015 and finished in August 2016. In 2016–17, the stadium served temporary as the home of Kosovo national team, due to stadiums in Mitrovica and Pristina being renovated and not meeting UEFA standards.

=== Rivalries ===
==== Kosovo ====
This derby is otherwise known as Brotherly derby (Albanian: Derbi vëllazëror), or the Brotherly (Albanian: Vëllazërorja). The documented beginnings of this derby date back to World War II, specifically on 29 November 1942, where they played a friendly match as part of the celebrations for the 30th anniversary of the independence of Albania. The match ended with a 2–0 win for Tirana. (Note: The alternative name of the Albania national team that was used during this match.)

==== Serbia ====
This football rivalry between Albania and Serbia is mainly due to historical tensions between the two countries. It has been described as "one of the fiercest rivalries in the world". During the Euro 2016 qualifying phase, with Portugal, Denmark and Armenia, the Serbian crowd were chanting "kill, kill the Albanians" and were throwing flares at the Albanian players, after which there was a clash between the two teams.

Both countries were drawn in the same group for the 2026 FIFA World Cup qualification, with England, Latvia and Andorra.

=== Supporters ===
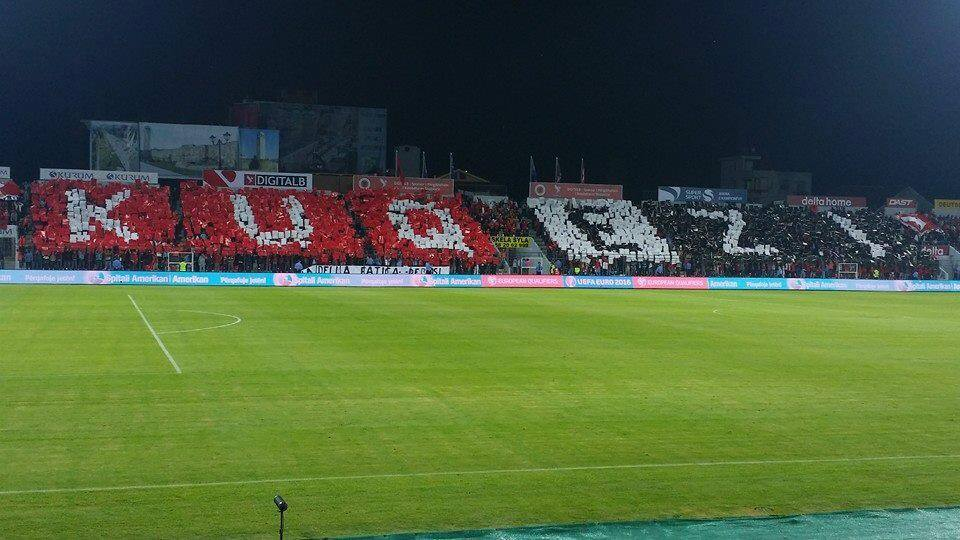
A choreography of Tifozat Kuq e Zi in the national team's first match at Elbasan Arena against Denmark in October 2014

Tifozat Kuq e Zi (Red and Black Fans) is a non-profit football supporters' association for the Albania national football team and various national team sportive activities. It was founded on 25 December 2003. In cooperation with FSHF, it organises trips for football fans to visit games, and develops and sells merchandise to support itself and fund sporting related projects.

Tifozat Kuq e Zi stands firm in the political view that Albanians should share only one national team and have continuous aspirations to join in one state (Një Komb, Një Kombëtare), i.e. unification of Albania, Kosovo, etc. In this sense, TKZ is joined by different supporters' associations throughout Albanian-speaking regions mainly in Kosovo (Shqiponjat of Peja, Kuqezinjet e Jakoves of Gjakova, Plisat of Prishtina, Torcida of Mitrovica, etc.), North Macedonia (Ballistët of Tetovë, Ilirët of Kumanovë, Shvercerat of Shkupi, etc.) and in Albania itself (Ultras Guerrils of Partizani Tirana, Tirona Fanatics of KF Tirana, Vllaznit Ultras of Vllaznia Shkodër, Ujqërit e Deborës of Skënderbeu Korçë, Shqiponjat of KF Besa Pejë and many other different Albanian fans).

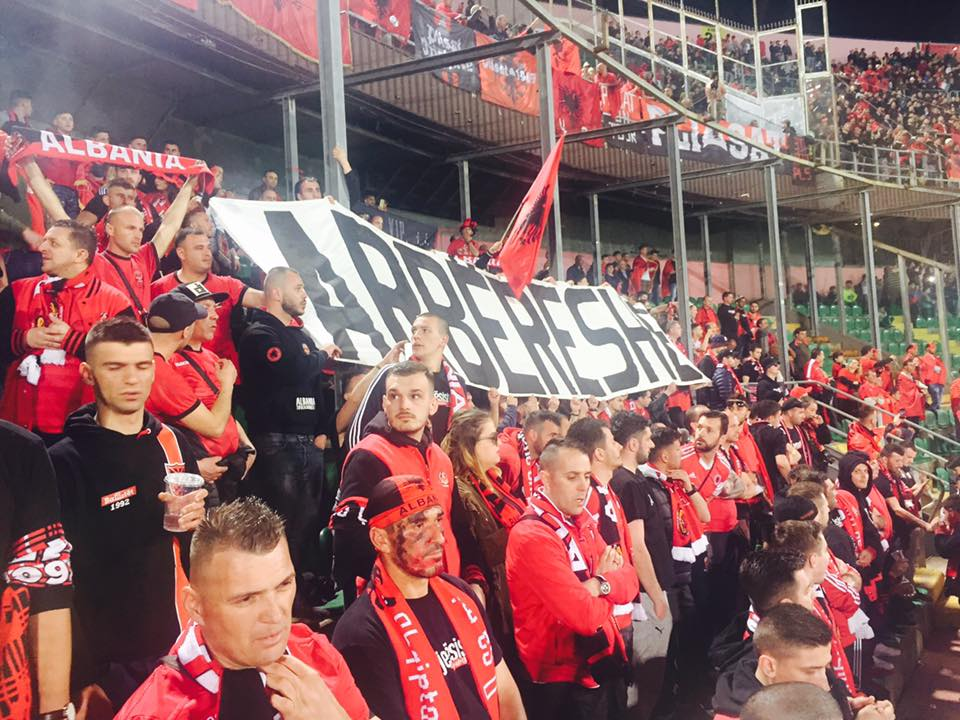
Albanian and Arbëreshë fans in Palermo, for the Italy-Albania 2018 FIFA World Cup qualifier match on 24 March 2017

The ongoing dispute between the Ministry of Culture, Youth and Sports and the Football Federation of Albania has been seen as a political intrusion by FIFA and UEFA, which led to the banning of Albania from international sportive activities. FSHF president Armand Duka is highly unwanted by the TKZ who have numerously asked for his resignation believing he is responsible for internal corruption in the Albanian Football Federation.

The TKZ have been praised by many different football players and managers, whom were not just Albanian. One example is with Switzerland's former coach, Ottmar Hitzfeld, who was astonished by how many Albanian fans turned up and how enthusiastic they were in 2014 FIFA World Cup qualifying match between Switzerland and Albania where the Swiss won 2–0 thanks to goals from Gökhan Inler and Kosovo-born Xherdan Shaqiri. He did not believe that there were 12,000 Albanian fans in the stands which was more than how many Swiss fans turned up for the game. He stated that "Albanian fans are fantastic and the most passionate fans I have ever seen". During that campaign, TKZ attended all games Albania played apart from a match against Cyprus in Nicosia and were also large in numbers in the away games to Slovenia in Maribor and Norway in Oslo.

== Results and fixtures ==
The following is a list of match results in the last 12 months, as well as any future matches that have been scheduled.

Win Draw Loss Fixture

=== 2026 ===
26 March 2026 World Cup qualification play-offs	Poland	2–1	Albania	Warsaw, Poland
20:45 UTC+1	Lewandowski 63'; Zieliński 73'	Report	Hoxha 42'	Stadium: Stadion Narodowy; Attendance: 56,412; Referee: Anthony Taylor (England)

31 March Friendly	Ukraine	1–0	Albania	Valencia, Spain (Note: Due to the Russian invasion of Ukraine, Ukraine are required to play their home matches at neutral venues until further notice.)
20:45	Hutsulyak 46'	Report		Stadium: Estadio Ciutat de València; Attendance: 7,100; Referee: Juan Martínez Munuera (Spain)

3 June Friendly	Albania	0–1	Israel	Tirana, Albania
20:00		Report	Gloukh 73'	Stadium: Arena Kombëtare; Attendance: 6,600; Referee: Miloš Savović (Montenegro)

6 June Friendly	Albania	0–1	Luxembourg	Tirana, Albania
20:00 UTC+2		Report	Sinani 8'	Stadium: Arena Kombëtare; Attendance: 5,142; Referee: Genc Nuza (Kosovo)

26 September 2026–27 Nations League	Albania	2–0	Belarus	Tirana, Albania
20:45	Asllani 34' (pen.); Muçi 45+2'	Report		Stadium: Arena Kombëtare; Attendance: 18,150; Referee: Sam Barrott (England)

29 September 2026–27 Nations League	San Marino	0–3	Albania	Serravalle, San Marino
20:45		Report	Mehmeti 21'; Uzuni 27'; Manaj 65'	Stadium: San Marino Stadium; Attendance: 3,402; Referee: Mihály Káprály (Hungary)

3 October 2026–27 Nations League	Finland	2–1	Albania	Helsinki, Finland
15:00 (16:00 UTC+3)	Walta 26', 71'	Report	Manaj 4'	Stadium: Helsinki Olympic Stadium; Attendance: 24,885; Referee: Rob Hennessy (Republic of Ireland)

6 October 2026–27 Nations League	Albania	2–1	San Marino	Tirana, Albania
20:45	Asllani 11', 90+3' (pen.)	Report	Lazzari 66'	Stadium: Arena Kombëtare; Attendance: 16,240; Referee: Mehmet Türkmen (Turkey)

12 November 2026–27 Nations League	Albania	2–0	Finland	Tirana, Albania
20:45	Muçi 35'; Manaj 50'	Report		Stadium: Arena Kombëtare; Attendance: 20,942; Referee: João Pinheiro (Portugal)

15 November 2026–27 Nations League	Belarus	0–2	Albania	Budapest, Hungary (Note: Due to Belarusian involvement in the Russian invasion of Ukraine, Belarus are required to play their home matches at neutral venues, and behind closed doors, until further notice.)
18:00 (20:00 UTC+3)		Report	Manaj 28'; Hysaj 57'	Stadium: Illovszky Rudolf Stadion; Attendance: 0 Referee: Igor Pajač (Croatia)

== Coaching staff ==
As of 22 March 2026

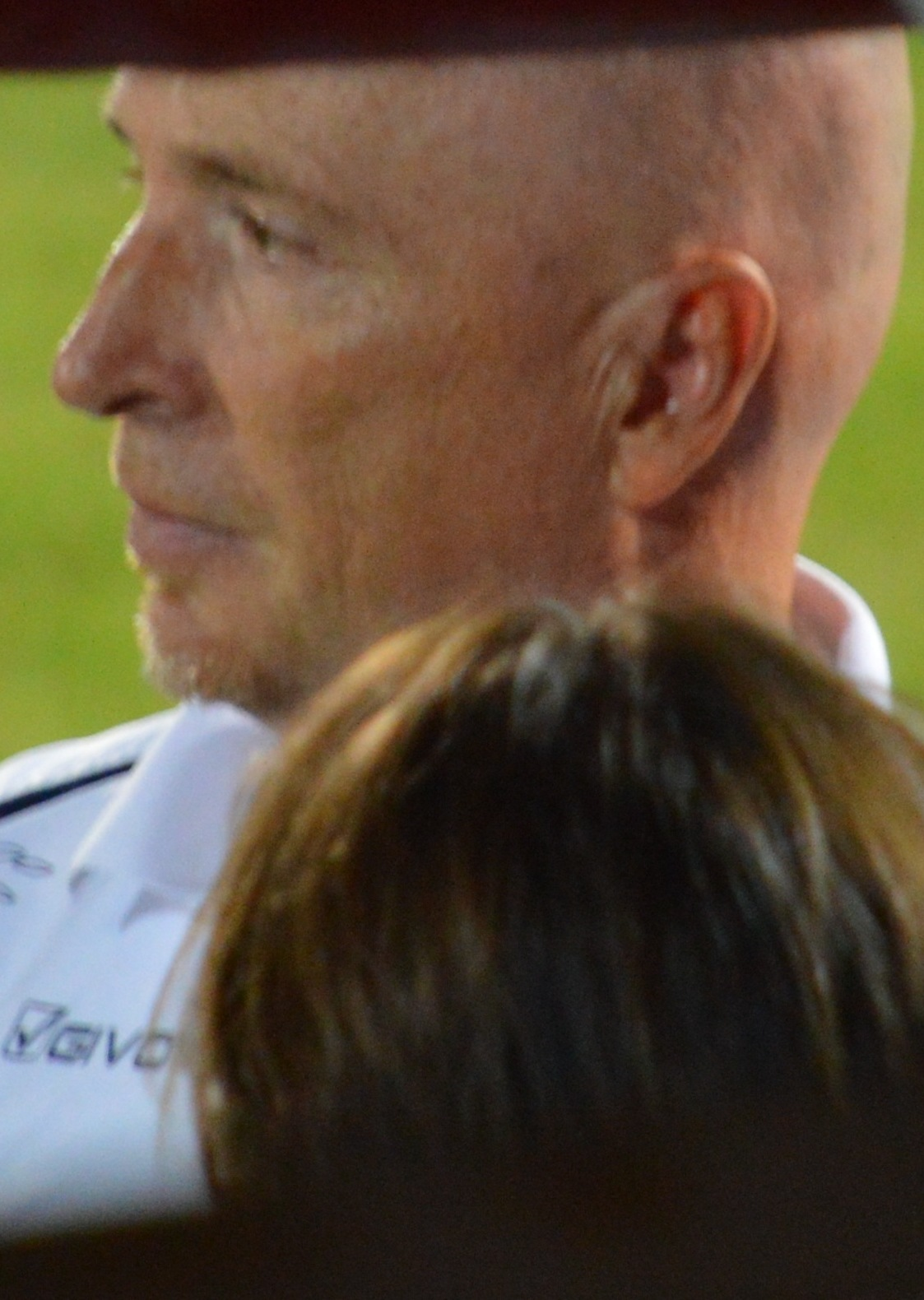
Rolando Maran, the current head coach of Albania national football team.

Position	Name
Head coach	(Italy) Rolando Maran
Assistant coach(es)	(Italy) Christian Maraner
Assistant coach(es)	(Albania) Ervin Bulku
Assistant coach(es)	(Poland) Bartosz Salamon
Goalkeeping coach	(Albania) Alfred Osmani
Athletic coach(es)	(Albania) Iris Selimi
Athletic coach(es)	(Italy) Andrea Tonelli
Physiotherapist	(Albania) Arzen Voci
Video analyst	(Albania) Endi Çuçi
First-team doctor	(Italy) Gianluca Stesina
Team manager	(Albania) Dritan Babamusta

== Players ==
=== Current squad ===
- The following players were called up for the 2026–27 UEFA Nations League matches against Finland and Belarus, on 12 and 15 November 2026.
- Caps and goals are correct as of 15 November 2026, after the match against Belarus.

No.	Pos.	Player	Date of birth (age)	Caps	Goals	Club
1	GK	Etrit Berisha	10 March 1989 (age 37)	85	0	(Swedish Football Association) BK Häcken
12	GK	Alen Sherri	15 December 1997 (age 28)	5	0	(Italian Football Federation) Cagliari
23	GK	Mario Dajsinani	23 December 1998 (age 27)	4	0	(Albanian Football Federation) Egnatia
2	DF	Stavro Pilo	10 December 2000 (age 25)	7	0	(Hellenic Football Federation) AEK Athens
3	DF	Mario Mitaj	6 August 2003 (age 23)	39	0	(Italian Football Federation) Genoa
4	DF	Elseid Hysaj (vice-captain)	2 February 1994 (age 32)	105	3	Unattached
5	DF	Arlind Ajeti	25 September 1993 (age 33)	41	1	(Turkish Football Federation) Bodrum
6	DF	Berat Gjimshiti (captain)	19 February 1993 (age 33)	79	1	(Saudi Arabian Football Federation) Al-Diriyah
13	DF	Naser Aliji	27 December 1993 (age 32)	19	0	(Albanian Football Federation) Dinamo City
15	DF	Klisman Cake	2 May 1999 (age 27)	1	0	(Russian Football Union) Akhmat Grozny
18	DF	Ardian Ismajli	30 September 1996 (age 30)	53	3	(Italian Football Federation) Torino
20	DF	Ysni Ismaili	13 March 2002 (age 24)	0	0	(Albanian Football Federation) Dinamo City
8	MF	Kristjan Asllani	9 March 2002 (age 24)	48	8	(United Arab Emirates Football Association) Al Jazira
10	MF	Feta Fetai	11 May 2005 (age 21)	1	0	(Croatian Football Federation) Lokomotiva
14	MF	Qazim Laçi	19 January 1996 (age 30)	50	4	(Turkish Football Federation) Çaykur Rizespor
16	MF	Juljan Shehu	6 September 1998 (age 28)	17	0	(Polish Football Association) Widzew Łódź
17	MF	Taulant Seferi	15 November 1996 (age 30)	28	3	(Turkish Football Federation) Kayserispor
21	MF	Arbër Hoxha	6 October 1998 (age 28)	31	2	(Croatian Football Federation) Dinamo Zagreb
22	MF	Luis Hasa	6 January 2004 (age 22)	4	0	(Italian Football Federation) Frosinone
7	FW	Rey Manaj	24 February 1997 (age 29)	51	15	(Turkish Football Federation) Sivasspor
9	FW	Cristian Shpendi	19 May 2003 (age 23)	4	0	(Italian Football Federation) Cesena
11	FW	Myrto Uzuni	31 May 1995 (age 31)	54	7	(United States Soccer Federation) Austin FC
19	FW	Mirlind Daku	1 January 1998 (age 28)	22	1	(Russian Football Union) Spartak Moscow

=== Recent call-ups ===
The following players have also been called up for the team within the last twelve months and are still available and eligible for selection.

Pos.	Player	Date of birth (age)	Caps	Goals	Club	Latest call-up
GK	Simon Simoni	14 July 2004 (age 22)	1	0	(Switzerland) Luzern	v. San Marino, 6 October 2026^{U21}
GK	Alain Taho	30 April 2007 (age 19)	0	0	(Italy) Inter U23	v. San Marino, 6 October 2026^{U21}
GK	Pano Qirko	26 June 1999 (age 27)	0	0	(Albania) Partizani	v. Luxembourg, 6 June 2026
GK	Thomas Strakosha	19 March 1995 (age 31)	47	0	(Greece) AEK Athens	v. Ukraine, 31 March 2026^{INJ}
GK	Elhan Kastrati	2 February 1997 (age 29)	3	0	(Greece) Athens Kallithea	v. Ukraine, 31 March 2026
DF	Samuele Sina	14 February 2007 (age 19)	1	0	(Italy) Union Brescia	v. Finland, 12 November 2026^{PRE}^{U21}
DF	Marash Kumbulla	8 February 2000 (age 26)	27	0	(Spain) Rayo Vallecano	v. San Marino, 6 October 2026
DF	Iván Balliu^{RET}	1 January 1992 (age 34)	24	0	(Spain) Rayo Vallecano	v. Belarus, 26 September 2026^{INJ}
DF	Andi Hadroj	22 February 1999 (age 27)	4	0	(Albania) Vllaznia	v. Luxembourg, 6 June 2026
DF	Bujar Pllana	29 October 2001 (age 25)	2	0	(Switzerland) Grasshopper	v. Luxembourg, 6 June 2026
MF	Ernest Muçi	19 March 2001 (age 25)	22	5	(Turkey) Trabzonspor	v. Belarus, 15 November 2026^{INJ}
MF	Ylber Ramadani	12 April 1996 (age 30)	54	1	(Turkey) Çorum	v. Belarus, 15 November 2026^{SUS}
MF	Klevi Qefalija	12 December 2003 (age 22)	1	0	(Albania) Dinamo City	v. Finland, 12 November 2026^{PRE}
MF	Anis Mehmeti	9 January 2001 (age 25)	9	1	(England) Ipswich Town	v. San Marino, 6 October 2026
MF	Adrion Pajaziti	16 November 2002 (age 24)	8	0	(Croatia) Hajduk Split	v. Belarus, 26 September 2026^{INJ}
MF	Sabah Kerjota	14 August 2001 (age 25)	0	0	(Scotland) Heart of Midlothian	v. Belarus, 26 September 2026^{PRE}
MF	Nedim Bajrami	28 February 1999 (age 27)	45	7	(Saudi Arabia) Al Taawoun	v. Luxembourg, 6 June 2026
MF	Nazmi Gripshi	5 July 1997 (age 29)	1	0	(Russia) Rubin Kazan	v. Ukraine, 31 March 2026
FW	Armando Broja	10 September 2001 (age 25)	37	6	(England) Burnley	v. Luxembourg, 6 June 2026
FW	Jasir Asani	19 May 1995 (age 31)	26	6	(Iran) Esteghlal	v. Ukraine, 31 March 2026
Notes: ^{U21} = Was called up from national U21 team.; ^{INJ} = It is not part of the current squad due to injury.; ^{PRE} = Preliminary squad/standby.; ^{RET} = Retired from international football.

== Individual records ==
As of 15 November 2026
Players in bold are still active with Albania.

=== Most appearances ===
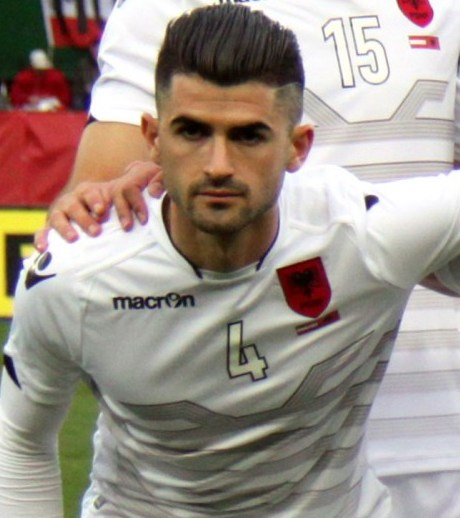
Elseid Hysaj is Albania's most capped player with 104 appearances.

Rank	Name	Caps	Goals	Career
1	**Elseid Hysaj**	105	3	2013–present
2	Lorik Cana	93	1	2003–2016
3	**Etrit Berisha**	85	0	2012–present
4	**Berat Gjimshiti**	79	1	2015–present
4	Altin Lala	79	3	1998–2011
6	Klodian Duro	77	4	2001–2011
7	Ervin Skela	75	13	2000–2011
7	Erjon Bogdani	75	18	1996–2013
9	Foto Strakosha	73	0	1990–2005
9	Ansi Agolli	73	3	2005–2017

=== Top goalscorers ===
Rank	Player	Goals	Caps	Average	Career
1	Erjon Bogdani	18	75	0.24	1996–2013
2	**Rey Manaj**	15	51	0.29	2015–present
3	Alban Bushi	14	67	0.21	1995–2007
4	Sokol Cikalleshi	13	60	0.22	2014–2024
4	Ervin Skela	13	75	0.17	2000–2011
6	Armando Sadiku	12	39	0.31	2012–2023
7	Hamdi Salihi	11	50	0.22	2006–2015
7	Altin Rraklli	11	63	0.17	1992–2005
9	Sokol Kushta	10	31	0.32	1987–1996
9	Igli Tare	10	68	0.15	1997–2007

== Competitive record ==
=== FIFA World Cup ===
FIFA World Cup record										Qualification record						
Year	Round	Pos.	Pld	W	D	L	GF	GA	Squad	Pos.	Pld	W	D	L	GF	GA
(Uruguay) 1930	Not a FIFA member									Not a FIFA member						
(Italy) 1934 to (Chile) 1962	Did not participate									Did not participate						
(England) 1966	Did not qualify									4th	6	0	1	5	2	12
(Mexico) 1970	Entry not accepted									Entry not accepted						
(West Germany) 1974	Did not qualify									4th	6	1	0	5	3	13
(Argentina) 1978	Did not participate									Did not participate						
(Spain) 1982	Did not qualify									4th	8	1	0	7	4	22
(Mexico) 1986	Did not qualify									3rd	6	1	2	3	6	9
(Italy) 1990	Did not qualify									4th	6	0	0	6	3	15
(United States) 1994	Did not qualify									7th	12	1	2	9	6	26
(France) 1998	Did not qualify									6th	10	1	1	8	7	20
(South Korea) (Japan) 2002	Did not qualify									5th	8	1	0	7	5	14
(Germany) 2006	Did not qualify									5th	12	4	1	7	11	20
(South Africa) 2010	Did not qualify									5th	10	1	4	5	6	13
(Brazil) 2014	Did not qualify									5th	10	3	2	5	9	11
(Russia) 2018	Did not qualify									3rd	10	4	1	5	10	13
(Qatar) 2022	Did not qualify									3rd	10	6	0	4	12	12
(Canada) (Mexico) (United States) 2026	Did not qualify									2nd R2 P.O	9	4	2	3	8	7
(Spain) (Portugal) (Morocco) 2030 (Note: Additional matches are scheduled to be played in Argentina, Paraguay, and Uruguay in commemoration of the 100th anniversary of the first world cup, however they are not considered to be official hosts of the tournament.)	To be determined									To be determined						
(Saudi Arabia) 2034	To be determined									To be determined						
Total	—	0/23	0	0	0	0	0	0	—	14/23	123	28	16	79	92	207

=== UEFA European Championship ===
UEFA European Championship record										Qualifying record						
Year	Round	Pos.	Pld	W	D	L	GF	GA	Squad	Pos.	Pld	W	D	L	GF	GA
(France) 1960	Did not participate									Did not participate						
(Spain) 1964	Did not qualify									R16	4	3	0	1	7	4
(Italy) 1968	Did not qualify									3rd	4	0	1	3	0	12
(Belgium) 1972	Did not qualify									4th	6	1	1	4	5	9
(Socialist Federal Republic of Yugoslavia) 1976 to (Italy) 1980	Did not participate									Did not participate						
(France) 1984	Did not qualify									5th	8	0	2	6	4	14
(West Germany) 1988	Did not qualify									4th	6	0	0	6	2	17
(Sweden) 1992	Did not qualify									5th	7	1	0	6	2	21
(England) 1996	Did not qualify									5th	10	2	2	6	10	16
(Belgium) (Netherlands) 2000	Did not qualify									5th	10	1	4	5	8	14
(Portugal) 2004	Did not qualify									4th	8	2	2	4	11	15
(Austria) (Switzerland) 2008	Did not qualify									5th	12	2	5	5	12	18
(Poland) (Ukraine) 2012	Did not qualify									5th	10	2	3	5	7	14
(France) 2016	Group stage	18th	3	1	0	2	1	3	Squad	2nd	8	4	2	2	10	5
(Europe) 2020	Did not qualify									4th	10	4	1	5	16	14
(Germany) 2024	Group stage	21st	3	0	1	2	3	5	Squad	1st	8	4	3	1	12	4
(England) (Scotland) (Republic of Ireland) (Wales) 2028	To be determined									To be determined						
(Italy) (Turkey) 2032	To be determined									To be determined						
Total	Group stage	2/17	6	1	1	4	4	8	—	14/17	111	26	26	59	100	177

Albania's European Championship record
First match	Albania 0–1 Switzerland (Stade Bollaert-Delelis, Lens, France; 11 June 2016)
Biggest win	Romania 0–1 Albania (Parc Olympique Lyonnais, Lyon, France; 19 June 2016)
Biggest defeat	France 2–0 Albania (Stade Vélodrome, Marseille, France; 15 June 2016)
Best result	Group stage in 2016 and 2024
Worst result	Group stage in 2016 and 2024

=== UEFA Nations League ===
UEFA Nations League record
League phase**												Finals							
Season	L&G	Pos.	Pld	W	D	L	GF	GA	P/R	RK	Year	Pos.	Pld	W	D*	L	GF	GA	Squad
2018–19	C1	3rd	4	1	0	3	1	8	Same position	34th	(Portugal) 2019	Did not qualify							
2020–21	C4	1st	6	3	2	1	8	4	▲	35th	(Italy) 2021	Did not qualify							
2022–23	B2	3rd	4	0	2	2	4	6	Same position	27th	(Netherlands) 2023	Did not qualify							
2024–25	B1	4th	6	2	1	3	4	6	▼	29th	(Germany) 2025	Did not qualify							
2026–27	C1	1st	6	5	0	1	12	3	▲	34th	2027	Did not qualify							
2028–29	B	-	-	-	-	-	-	-			2029	Did not qualify							
2030–31	To be determined										2031								
Total			26	11	5	10	29	27	27th		Total	—	—	—	—	—	—	—	—

*Draws include knockout matches decided via penalty shoot-out.
**League stage played home and away. Flag shown represents host nation for the finals stage.

=== Summer Olympics ===
Olympic Games record										Qualification record						
Year	Result	Pos.	Pld	W	D	L	GF	GA	Squad	Pos.	Pld	W	D	L	GF	GA
(United Kingdom) 1908 to (Germany) 1936	Team did not exist									Team did not exist						
(United Kingdom) 1948 to (Italy) 1960	Did not participate									Did not participate						
(Japan) 1964	Did not qualify									PR	2	0	0	2	0	2
(Mexico) 1968	Did not participate									Did not participate						
(West Germany) 1972	Did not qualify									PO	2	0	0	2	2	4
(Canada) 1976 to (South Korea) 1988	Did not participate									Did not participate						
Since (Spain) 1992	See Albania national under-23 team									See Albania national under-23 team						
Total	—	0/2	0	0	0	0	0	0	—	2/2	4	0	0	4	2	6

=== Other tournaments ===
Champions Runners-up Third place Tournament played fully or partially on home soil

Year	Ranking	Pos.	Pld	W	D	L	GF	GA	Squad
Balkan Cup
(Albania) 1946	Winner	1st	3	2	0	1	6	4	Squad
1947	Fifth place	5th	4	0	0	4	2	13	Squad
1948	Fifth place	5th	3	1	2	0	1	0	Squad
Malta International Tournament
1998	Third place	3rd	3	0	2	1	3	6	Squad
2000	Winner	1st	3	3	0	0	5	0	Squad
Bahrain Shoot Tournament
2002	Third place	3rd	3	0	2	1	1	4	Squad
Total	Best: Winner	6/6	19	6	6	7	18	27	—

=== Medal table overview ===
Overview
Event	1st place	2nd place	3rd place
World Cup	0	0	0
UEFA European Championship	0	0	0
UEFA Nations League	0	0	0
Summer Olympics	0	0	0
Mediterranean Games	0	0	0
Balkan Cup	1	0	0
Malta International Tournament	1	0	1
Bahrain Shoot Tournament	0	0	1

== FIFA rankings ==
As of 7 October 2026

Best Ranking Worst Ranking Best Mover Worst Mover

Albania's FIFA world rankings
Rank	Year	Pld	Best		Worst	
Rank	Year	Pld	Rank	Move	Rank	Move
66	2026	8	63	▲1	67	▼3
63	2025	10	61	▲4	68	▼3
65	2024	13	64	▲2	67	▼2
62	2023	9	59	▲3	68	▼3
66	2022	11	65	▲1	69	▼1
66	2021	12	63	▲3	69	▼3
66	2020	7	66	▲3	69	▼3
66	2019	9	61	▲2	66	▼4
60	2018	9	56	▲2	60	▼3
62	2017	9	51	▲9	71	▼12
49	2016	12	35	▲5	49	▼10
38	2015	7	22	▲15	63	▼7
58	2014	9	45	▲25	70	▼16
57	2013	8	37	▲16	71	▼13
63	2012	9	58	▲17	97	▼10
74	2011	11	50	▲23	75	▼14
65	2010	9	58	▲13	97	▼7
96	2009	9	78	▲3	98	▼11
81	2008	7	73	▲19	102	▼18
80	2007	11	66	▲11	88	▼12
87	2006	6	62	▲20	88	▼13
82	2005	10	82	▲7	93	▼4
86	2004	8	86	▲5	94	▼5
89	2003	11	86	▲13	101	▼5
93	2002	9	92	▲4	97	▼5
96	2001	7	74	▲1	96	▼6
72	2000	8	72	▲13	94	▼6
83	1999	8	83	▲15	95	▼2
106	1998	8	97	▲14	109	▼8
116	1997	7	113	▲8	124	▼4
116	1996	5	90	▲6	116	▼12
91	1995	8	87	▲13	106	▼6
100	1994	5	93	▲9	113	▼11
92	1993	7	91	▲1	93	▼6
86	1992	6	86	–	86	–

== Head-to-head record ==
As of 15 November 2026 after the match against Belarus.

Key
Positive balance (more Wins)
Neutral balance (Wins = Losses)
Negative balance (more Losses)

Opponent	Pld	W	D	L	GF	GA	GD	Win %	Reference
Algeria (Note: Includes match against the Algeria Olympic team.)	2	1	1	0	4	1	+3	50%	H2H results H2H results*
Andorra	9	7	1	1	15	4	+11	77.77%	H2H results
Argentina	1	0	0	1	0	4	−4	0%	H2H results
Armenia	6	4	1	1	10	5	+5	66.6%	H2H results
Austria	7	0	0	7	2	19	−17	0%	H2H results
Azerbaijan	6	4	1	1	8	4	+4	66.6%	H2H results
Bahrain	1	0	0	1	0	3	−3	0%	H2H results
Belarus	9	5	2	2	14	10	+4	55.5%	H2H results
Belgium	2	1	0	1	3	3	0	50%	H2H results
Bosnia and Herzegovina	5	1	2	2	4	5	−1	20%	H2H results
Bulgaria	14	3	4	7	10	17	−7	21.4%	H2H results
Cameroon	1	0	1	0	0	0	0	0%	H2H results
Chile	1	0	0	1	0	3	−3	0%	H2H results
China	2	0	1	1	3	4	−1	0%	H2H results H2H results*
Croatia	1	0	1	0	2	2	0	0%	H2H results
Cuba	1	0	1	0	0	0	0	0%	H2H results
Cyprus	6	2	2	2	12	7	+5	33.3%	H2H results
Czech Republic (Note: Includes matches against Czechoslovakia.)	10	3	2	5	11	16	−5	30%	H2H results
Denmark	10	1	3	6	4	19	−15	10%	H2H results
East Germany	3	0	1	2	2	7	−5	0%	H2H results
England	8	0	0	8	1	23	−22	0%	H2H results
Estonia	4	1	3	0	3	1	+2	25%	H2H results
Faroe Islands	2	1	1	0	3	1	+2	50%	H2H results
Finland	9	3	1	5	9	10	−1	33%	H2H results
France	9	1	1	7	4	20	−16	11.1%	H2H results
Georgia	17	4	4	9	14	24	−10	23.5%	H2H results
Germany (Note: Includes matches against West Germany.)	14	0	1	13	10	38	−28	0%	H2H results
Gibraltar	1	1	0	0	1	0	+1	100%	H2H results
Greece (Note: Includes awarded matches at the Euro 1964 qualifying.)	15	6	3	6	16	13	+3	50%	H2H results
Hungary	8	2	1	5	2	19	−17	25%	H2H results
Iceland	9	3	2	4	11	12	−1	33.3%	H2H results
Iran	1	1	0	0	1	0	+1	100%	H2H results
Israel	7	2	0	5	6	10	−4	28.5%	H2H results
Italy	5	0	0	5	2	9	−5	0%	H2H results
Jordan	2	1	1	0	4	2	+2	50%	H2H results
Kazakhstan	4	3	1	0	6	2	+4	75%	H2H results
Kosovo	7	5	1	1	13	9	+1	71%	H2H results
Latvia	7	1	6	0	8	7	+1	14.28%	H2H results
Liechtenstein	4	4	0	0	6	0	+9	100%	H2H results
Lithuania	6	2	1	3	7	7	0	33.3%	H2H results
Luxembourg	8	3	1	4	8	8	0	37.5%	H2H results
North Macedonia	10	2	4	4	7	12	−5	20%	H2H results
Malta	8	5	2	1	14	3	+11	62.5%	H2H results
Mexico	1	0	0	1	0	4	−4	0%	H2H results
Moldova	7	5	2	0	15	3	+12	71.4%	H2H results
Montenegro	3	3	0	0	9	2	+7	100%	H2H results 1946 match
Morocco	1	0	1	0	0	0	0	0%	H2H results
Netherlands	4	0	0	4	1	7	−6	0%	H2H results
Northern Ireland	9	2	2	5	5	13	−8	22.2%	H2H results
Norway	5	1	2	2	5	6	−1	20%	H2H results
Poland	16	2	3	11	11	22	−11	12.5%	H2H results
Portugal	7	1	1	5	5	13	−8	14.2%	H2H results
Qatar	3	2	0	1	5	3	+2	66.6%	H2H results
Republic of Ireland	4	0	1	3	2	6	−4	0%	H2H results
Romania (Note: Includes matches against the Romania Olympic team at 1971 Mediterranean Games qualifying.)	19	3	3	13	12	45	−33	15.7%	H2H results H2H results*
Russia	2	1	0	1	4	5	−1	50%	H2H results
Scotland	2	0	0	2	0	6	−6	0%	H2H results
San Marino	6	6	0	0	18	1	+16	100%	H2H results
Saudi Arabia	1	0	1	0	1	1	0	0%	H2H results
Serbia (Note: Includes matches against Yugoslavia.)	9	2	2	5	8	15	−7	22.2%	H2H results
Slovenia	7	1	2	4	2	6	−4	14.2%	H2H results
Spain	9	0	0	9	3	32	−28	0%	H2H results
Sweden	6	1	1	4	5	11	−6	16.6%	H2H results
Switzerland	7	0	1	6	4	12	−8	0%	H2H results
Turkey	12	4	2	6	14	13	+1	33.3%	H2H results
Ukraine	9	1	1	7	7	17	−10	11.1%	H2H results
Uzbekistan	1	1	0	0	1	0	+1	100%	H2H results
Vietnam	1	1	0	0	5	0	+5	100%	H2H results
Wales	4	1	2	1	2	3	−1	25%	H2H results
69 nations	415	121	85	209	405	606	−201	28.9%	All H2H results

== Honours ==
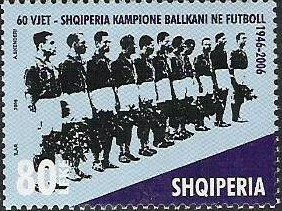
2007 Postage stamp of Albania, commemorating the 60th Anniversary of Victory at the Balkan Cup

=== Regional ===
- Balkan Cup
  - Champions (1): 1946

=== Friendly ===
- Malta International Tournament
  - Champions (1): 2000

== See also ==
- Albanian Football Association
- Football in Albania
- History of Albanian football
- Tifozat Kuq e Zi
- Albania national youth football team
- Albania national under-23 football team (defunct)
- Albania national under-21 football team
- Albania national under-20 football team
- Albania national under-19 football team
- Albania national under-18 football team
- Albania national under-17 football team
- Albania national under-16 football team
- Albania national under-15 football team
