= Mikel Canka =

Albanian footballer (born 1987)

Personal information
- Full name: Mikel Canka
- Date of birth: 18 February 1987 (age 39)
- Place of birth: Lushnjë, Albania
- Height: 1.79 m (5 ft 10 in)
- Position: Striker

Team information
- Current team: Lushnja
- Number: 18

Youth career
- Lushnja

Senior career*
Years	Team	Apps	(Gls)
2007–2014	Lushnja	115	(56)
2014–2015	Apolonia	15	(1)
2015	Lushnja	14	(15)
2015–2016	Luftëtari	26	(15)
2016–2018	Lushnja	51	(18)
2018–2019	Egnatia	23	(5)
2019–2020	Lushnja	22	(16)
2020–2021	Tomori	21	(16)
2021–2022	Besa Kavajë	14	(4)
2022–	Lushnja	45	(23)
- * Club domestic league appearances and goals as of 1 June 2024

Mikel Canka (born 18 February 1987) is an Albanian professional footballer who plays as a striker for Lushnja in the Kategoria e Parë.

== Club career ==
Canka left his hometown club Lushnja following their relegation from the Kategoria Superiore and signed a three-year contract with newly promoted side Apolonia on 10 June 2014.

In 2015, during the winter transfer window, Canka left Apolonia after only half season to rejoin Lushnja until the end of 2014–15 season.

In July 2015, Canka left Lushnja and signed a one-year contract with fellow Kategoria e Parë side Luftëtari. During the 2015–16 season, Canka played 25 league matches, scoring 15 goals, as Luftëtari won the Group B and achieved the promotion to Kategoria Superiore.

In August 2016, Canka returned to Lushnja for a third time, and made his first appearance of the 2016–17 season on 26 September in the opening day against Tomori. On 18 October he scored a hat-trick, including first goals of the season in Lushnja's 1–4 win at Elbasani. This was followed by a brace in the 2–0 home win against Shkumbini four days later, scoring in the last minutes of the match, taking his tally up to 5 league goals. On 25 February of the following year, Canka scored a cruel goal against Apolonia in an eventual 2–0 away win in the matchday 17, helping Lushnja to win in Fier for the first time in 44 years. After helping the club to return to top flight after three years, Canka confirmed that he would remain in Lushnja for the next season. On 24 July, he extended his contract for another season.

Canka scored his first top flight goal in three years on 26 November 2017 in the 2–1 away defeat to Kamza valid for week 12. Later on 16 December in the league match versus Skënderbeu, after the dismissal of goalkeeper Mikel Spaho and after all three of the club's substitutions were exhausted, Canka was put into goal for the final 7 minutes of the match, conceding a goal when he dropped a free-kick from Marko Radaš.

== Career statistics ==
As of 16 December 2017

Club statistics
Club	Season	League			Cup		Other		Total	
Club	Season	Division	Apps	Goals	Apps	Goals	Apps	Goals	Apps	Goals
Lushnja	2007–08	Kategoria e Parë	?	4	0	0	—		?	4
Lushnja	2008–09	Kategoria Superiore	8	0	0	0	—		8	0
Lushnja	2009–10	Kategoria e Parë	23	2	0	0	—		23	2
Lushnja	2010–11	Kategoria e Parë	0	0	0	0	—		0	0
Lushnja	2011–12	Kategoria e Parë	28	21	0	0	1 (Note: Appearance in Kategoria Superiore play-offs)	0	29	21
Lushnja	2012–13	Kategoria e Parë	28	21	3	4	—		31	25
Lushnja	2013–14	Kategoria Superiore	28	8	4	4	—		32	12
Lushnja	Total		115	56	7	8	1	0	123	64
Apolonia	2014–15	Kategoria Superiore	15	1	3	1	—		18	2
Lushnja	2014–15	Kategoria e Parë	14	15	0	0	—		14	15
Luftëtari	2015–16	Kategoria e Parë	25	15	0	0	—		25	15
Lushnja	2016–17	Kategoria e Parë	26	11	0	0	—		26	11
Lushnja	2017–18	Kategoria Superiore	14	1	1	0	—		15	1
Lushnja	Total		40	12	1	0	—		41	12
Career total			209	99	11	8	1	0	221	107

== Honours ==
Lushnja

- Kategoria e Parë: 2012–13

Luftëtari

- Kategoria e Parë: 2015–16

Individual

- Kategoria e Parë Top Goalscorer: 2012–13
