= TKZ =

TKZ can refer to:

- Tifozat Kuq e Zi, supporters' association for the Albania national football team
- TKZee, South African kwaito music group
- The Korean Zombie (TKZ), nickname for Korean mixed martial artist Chan Sung Jung
