= Sallaku =

Sallaku is an Albanian surname. Notable people with the surname include:

- Aladin Sallaku (born 1995), Albanian footballer
- Alaidin Sallaku (born 1995), Albanian footballer
- Senad Sallaku (born 1995), Albanian footballer
- Skënder Sallaku (1935–2014), Albanian comedian and actor
