= 2012–13 Kategoria e Parë =

Kategoria e Parë
- Season: 2012–13
- Champions: Lushnja
- Promoted: Lushnja; Partizani
- Relegated: Besëlidhja; Iliria; Gramshi; Naftëtari
- Matches: 240
- Goals: 583 (2.43 per match)
- Top goalscorer: Mikel Canka (21)
- Biggest home win: Butrinti 5-0 Gramshi (27 April 2013); Iliria 5-0 Elbasani (10 November 2012)
- Biggest away win: Partizani 0-3 Butrinti (8 September 2012); Naftëtari 0-3 Pogradeci (6 October 2012); Naftëtari 0-3 Lushnja (24 November 2012)
- Highest scoring: Kamza 5-3 Lushnja (4 May 2013)

The 2012–13 Kategoria e Parë was competed between 16 teams started on 31 August 2012 and finished on 12 May 2013.

== Changes from last season ==
=== Team changes ===
==== From Kategoria e Parë ====
Promoted to Kategoria Superiore:

- Luftëtari
- Kukësi
- Besa

Relegated to Kategoria e Dytë:

- Gramozi
- Vlora
- Skrapari

==== To Kategoria e Parë ====
Relegated from Kategoria Superiore:

- Kamza
- Pogradeci
- Dinamo Tirana

Promoted from Kategoria e Dytë:

- Tërbuni
- Partizani
- Naftëtari

== League table ==
Pos	Team	Pld	W	D	L	GF	GA	GD	Pts	Promotion or relegation
1	Lushnja (C, P)	30	20	6	4	48	22	+26	66	Promotion to 2013–14 Kategoria Superiore
2	Partizani (P)	30	16	8	6	39	33	+6	56	Promotion to 2013–14 Kategoria Superiore
3	Tërbuni	30	11	10	9	40	30	+10	43	
4	Adriatiku	30	12	7	11	48	45	+3	43	
5	Pogradeci	30	13	3	14	49	44	+5	42	
6	Himara	30	11	9	10	32	29	+3	42	
7	Burreli	30	12	6	12	32	31	+1	42	
8	Ada	30	11	8	11	34	31	+3	41	
9	Kamza	30	11	8	11	38	47	−9	41	
10	Butrinti	30	10	10	10	38	33	+5	40	
11	Dinamo Tirana	30	11	7	12	40	37	+3	40	
12	Elbasani	30	12	4	14	42	46	−4	40	
13	Besëlidhja (R)	30	10	8	12	28	30	−2	38	Relegation to 2013–14 Kategoria e Dytë
14	Iliria (R)	30	10	7	13	35	37	−2	37	Relegation to 2013–14 Kategoria e Dytë
15	Gramshi (R)	30	8	7	15	18	41	−23	31	Relegation to 2013–14 Kategoria e Dytë
16	Naftëtari (R)	30	4	8	18	22	47	−25	20	Relegation to 2013–14 Kategoria e Dytë

Source: Soccerway
Rules for classification: 1) points; 2) goal difference; 3) number of goals scored; 4) head-to-head points; 5) head-to-head goal difference; 6) draw. (Head-to-head record is applied for clubs with the same number of points only once all matches between said clubs have been played.)
(C) Champions; (P) Promoted; (R) Relegated

== Top scorers ==
Rank	Player	Club	Goals
1	(Albania) Mikel Canka	Lushnja	21
2	(Albania) Mateo Metaj	Adriatiku	18
3	(Albania) Rezart Maho	Kamza	14
4	(Albania) Enkelejd Pengu	Pogradeci	11
4	(Albania) Florian Pjetrani	Burreli	11
5	(Croatia) Matko Djarmati	Dinamo Tirana	10
