= Anes Meliqi =

Macedonian footballer

Personal information
- Date of birth: 9 January 2006 (age 20)
- Place of birth: Skopje, Macedonia
- Height: 1.92 m (6 ft 4 in)
- Position: Centre-back

Team information
- Current team: Shkëndija
- Number: 26

Youth career
- –2023: Shkëndija

Senior career*
Years	Team	Apps	(Gls)
2023–	Shkëndija	55	(7)

International career^{‡}
2021–2022	North Macedonia U17	7	(1)
2023–2024	North Macedonia U19	12	(2)
2024–	North Macedonia U21	15	(1)
2026–	North Macedonia	3	(0)
- * Club domestic league appearances and goals as of 14 October 2026 ‡ National team caps and goals as of 14 October 2026

Anes Meliqi (Macedonian: Анес Мелиќи; born 9 January 2006), also known as Anes Meljichi is a Macedonian professional footballer who plays as a centre-back for Shkëndija and the North Macedonia national team.

== Career ==
=== Shkëndija ===
Meliqi developed as a footballer in the youth system of KF Shkëndija, a football club based in Tetovo, North Macedonia. He progressed through the club's youth ranks before joining the senior team's training sessions and participating in friendly matches.

On 12 January 2024, Meliqi signed his first professional contract with Shkëndija, agreeing to a three-and-a-half-year deal. At the time of the signing, he was 18 years old. The announcement also noted his previous involvement with the senior squad and his experience representing North Macedonia at youth international level.

Meliqi subsequently continued his development with Shkëndija's senior squad, becoming a regular starting centre back in the 2025–26 seaso

== International career ==
Meliqi has represented North Macedonia throughout all youth international levels, leading to a debut for North Macedonia's senior national team in the 2026–27 UEFA Nations League matches in September 2026.

== Career statistics ==
=== Club ===
As of match played 14 October 2026

Appearances and goals by club, season and competition
Club	Season	League			National cup (Note: Includes Macedonian Cup)		Europe		Other		Total	
Club	Season	Division	Apps	Goals	Apps	Goals	Apps	Goals	Apps	Goals	Apps	Goals
Shkëndija	2023–24	1. MFL	7	0	0	0	0	0	—		7	0
Shkëndija	2024–25	1. MFL	13	0	5	0	0	0	—		18	0
Shkëndija	2025–26	1. MFL	28	5	4	1	5	0	—		37	6
Shkëndija	2026–27	1. MFL	7	2	—		4	0	—		11	2
Total			55	7	9	1	9	0	—		73	88

=== International ===
As of match played 14 October 2026

Appearances and goals by national team and year
National team	Year	Apps	Goals
North Macedonia	2026	3	0
Total		3	0

== Honours ==
Shkëndija

- Macedonian League: 2024–25
