= Matko Djarmati =

Croatian footballer

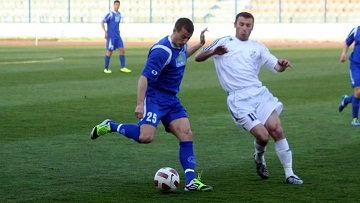
- Djarmati in 2012

Personal information
- Full name: Matko Djarmati
- Date of birth: 24 February 1982 (age 44)
- Place of birth: Rijeka, Republic of Croatia
- Height: 1.82 m (6 ft 0 in)
- Position: Midfielder

Youth career
- –2001: Rijeka

Senior career*
Years	Team	Apps	(Gls)
2001–2002	Rijeka	15	(1)
2002–2003	Istra Pula	26	(4)
2003–2004	Pomorac	22	(4)
2004–2006	Hrvatski Dragovoljac	54	(9)
2006–2007	Lamia	22	(3)
2007–2009	Pomorac	60	(7)
2009–2010	Skënderbeu	15	(1)
2010–2011	Kastrioti	27	(2)
2011	Besa	16	(1)
2011–2012	Long An	13	(6)
2012–2014	Dinamo Tirana	66	(19)
2014–2015	Tërbuni	17	(3)
2015– 2016	Kastrioti	25	(5)
Total		378	(65)

Managerial career
- 2018–2019: KF Tirana (Head Coach U19)
- 2019–2020: Football Republic (Head Coach U-17)
- 2020–2022: Vllaznia (sporting director)
- 2022–2023: Chennaiyin FC (assistant)
- 2023-2024: Al-Arabi Sporting Club (assistant)
- * Club domestic league appearances and goals as of 15 November 2015

Matko Djarmati (born 24 February 1982) is a Croatian football club manager. He is a UEFA Pro certified coach who currently is without team, his last club was Al-Arabi Sporting Club from Kuwait.

== Club career ==
Djarmati previously played for NK Rijeka in the Croatian Prva HNL and Skënderbeu in Kategoria Superiore. He also played for Lamia in the Greek Gamma Ethniki.

He finished one of the best Croatian schools for football (HNK Rijeka), and started his professional career in the same club. With HNK Rijeka he played some international games, part of UEFA league. After that, he played in Croatian second Division and one year in Greece. From 2009 until now Djarmati has played in Kategoria Superiore.

=== Dinamo Tirana ===
On 2 September 2012, Djarmati extended his contract with Dinamo Tirana for another one season, keeping him at the club until the end of 2012–13 season.

=== Tërbuni ===
On 22 March 2015, Djarmati received the first red-card of his career for punching a player during the 0–3 away win against Ada. He was banned for five matches, and returned in the first team for the league match against Adriatiku on 9 May. In this match, Djarmati started and played full-90 minutes as Tërbuni didn't go more and a goalless draw.

=== Kastrioti ===
On 13 July 2015, Djarmati returned to Kastrioti after almost five years by signing a one-year contract. He was given number 25 for the 2015–16 season. About this transfer, Djarmati said: "I'm very happy that i will be part of Kastrioti for the new season. I'm optimist that this team will be a rival to be promoted in Kategoria Superiore next season".

Djarmati started the season by playing only 25 minutes in team's opening match of the season against Erzeni on 12 September 2015, helping his side to start the season in the right way with a 2–1 win. He scored his first goal of the season one week later in the second match of the league, netting the first goal of his team that equaled the 0–2 disadvantage into a 2–2 draw against Adriatiku. He appeared again as a second-half substitute. In the beginning of September Djarmati suffered an injury that kept him outside of the field for three weeks.

On 30 September, Djarmati was again on the score sheet as he scored a decisive goal in a 2–1 loss against Besëlidhja in the returning leg of the first round of 2015–16 Albanian Cup, helping Kastrioti to pass the round with the away goal rule after winning the first match 1–0. In his first match as a starter on 7 November, Djarmati scored a brace as Kastrioti thrashed 4–1 Burreli in the week 8 of the league.

== Career statistics ==
=== Club ===
As of 12 November 2015

Club	Season	League		Cup		Continental (Note: Including continental competitions, such as UEFA Champions League and UEFA Europa League)		Other (Note: Including other competitions, such as Albanian Supercup)		Total	
Club	Season	Apps	Goals	Apps	Goals	Apps	Goals	Apps	Goals	Apps	Goals
Dinamo Tirana	2011–12	11	3	—		—		—		11	3
Dinamo Tirana	2012–13	29	10	1	0	—		—		30	10
Dinamo Tirana	2013–14	26	6	—		—		—		26	6
Dinamo Tirana	Total	66	19	1	0	0	0	0	0	67	19
Tërbuni	2014–15	17	3	—		—		—		17	3
Tërbuni	Total	17	3	0	0	0	0	0	0	17	3
Kastrioti	2015–16	5	3	2	1	—		—		7	4
Kastrioti	Total	5	3	2	1	0	0	0	0	7	4
Career total		88	25	3	1	0	0	0	0	91	26

== Honours ==
=== Club ===
Tërbuni

- Kategoria e Parë: Runner-up 2014–15

== Personal life ==
Djarmati is married to Gerta Heta, a well-known Albanian singer and television moderator. The couple married in 2010. Their baby daughter, Luna, was born one year later.

== Notes ==
Sporting positions
Unknown	Dinamo Tirana captain 2012–2014	Succeeded by Erxhan Muça
