= Tifozat Kuq e Zi =

Supporters' association of the Albanian national football team

- Tifozat Kuq e Zi logo with Big Sabit as its mascot
- Nickname: Kuqezinjtë (The Red and Blacks)
- Abbreviation: TKZ
- Founded: 25 December 2003; 22 years ago
- Type: Ultras group
- Team: Albania national football team
- Motto: O sa mirë me qenë Shqiptar! (How good it is to be Albanian!); Një Komb, Një Kombëtare (One Nation, One National Team)
- Headquarters: Tirana, Albania
- Arenas: Arena Kombëtare and other stadiums
- Stand: North
- Coordinates: 41°19′48″N 19°49′12″E
- Colors
- Website: tifozatkuqezi.com

Tifozat Kuq e Zi (lit. 'Red and Black Fans'), also known as the Albania National Football Team Supporters Club, is a non-profit football supporters' association for the Albania national football team and various national team sportive activities.

== History ==
It was founded on 25 December 2003. It organises trips for football fans to visit games, and develops and sells merchandise to support itself and fund various sporting and non-sporting-related projects.

Tifozat Kuq e Zi stands firm in the political view that Albanians should share only one national team and have continuous aspirations to join in one state (Një Komb, Një Kombëtare), i.e. unification of Albania, Kosovo, etc. In this sense, TKZ is joined by different supporters' associations throughout Albanian-speaking regions mainly in Kosovo (Kuqezinjet e Jakoves of Gjakova, Plisat of Pristina, Torcida of Mitrovica, Shqiponjat of KF Besa Pejë, Forca of Vushtrria, etc.), North Macedonia (Ballistët of Tetovo, Ilirët of Kumanovo, Shvercerat of Skopje, etc.) and in Albania itself (Ultras Guerrils of Partizani Tirana, Tirona Fanatics of KF Tirana, Vllaznit Ultras of Vllaznia Shkodër and many other different Albanian fans).

Tifozat Kuq e Zi have received praise from various football players and managers, including non-Albanian figures. Former Switzerland national team coach Ottmar Hitzfeld commented on the large and vocal Albanian supporter presence during the 2014 FIFA World Cup qualification – UEFA Group E match between Switzerland and Albania on 11 September 2012 at Swissporarena in Lucerne. Approximately 12,000 Albanian supporters attended the match, reportedly outnumbering home supporters. Hitzfeld described Albanian fans as among the most passionate he had seen. During the qualification campaign, TKZ attended all Albania matches except the away fixture against Cyprus in Nicosia. They were also present in significant numbers at away matches against Slovenia, which Albania lost 1–0, and Norway, where Albania won 1–0.
