= Kosta Bajić =

Serbian footballer

Personal information
- Full name: Kosta Bajić
- Date of birth: 7 September 1989 (age 37)
- Place of birth: Novi Sad, SFR Yugoslavia
- Height: 1.94 m (6 ft 4 in)
- Position: Striker

Youth career
- Vojvodina

Senior career*
Years	Team	Apps	(Gls)
2006	→ Sloga Temerin (loan)	11	(2)
2007	→ Srbobran (loan)		
2007–2008	→ OFK Futog (loan)		
2008	→ Metalac Futog (loan)	10	(0)
2009	→ Sloga Temerin (loan)	7	(2)
2009	ČSK Čelarevo	2	(0)
2009–2011	Mladost Bački Jarak	39	(18)
2011–2012	Radnički Nova Pazova	26	(11)
2012	Sloga Temerin	13	(7)
2013	Jedinstvo Užice	17	(2)
2013	Jagodina	1	(0)
2014	Rudar Pljevlja	8	(3)
2015–2016	Besëlidhja Lezhë	46	(34)
2017	FC Kyzylzhar		
2017	ČSK Čelarevo	5	(0)
2018	Besëlidhja Lezhë	10	(1)
2018	Budućnost Dobanovci		
2019–2020	Bratstvo Gračanica		
2020	Zvijezda Gradačac		
- * Club domestic league appearances and goals as of 12 February 2019

Kosta Bajić (Serbian Cyrillic: Коста Бајић; born 7 September 1989) is a Serbian professional footballer who plays as a striker.

== Club career ==
=== Early career ===
He passed through all categories of Vojvodina. Later, he played for the lower-ranked clubs, where he was a very effective. In summer of 2013, he signed for Jagodina, together with Aleksandar Pešić. He debut for Jagodina in last fixture of half-season Jelen SuperLiga versus Radnički Kragujevac. Coach gave a chance to him in last minutes.

=== Besëlidhja Lezhë ===
In January 2015, Bajić was transferred in Albania, signing a contract until the end of the season with Albanian First Division side KF Besëlidhja Lezhë. He was allocated squad number 9 and made his competitive debut with the club on 7 February in a goalless draw against Tërbuni Pukë. He endured a 292-minute scoreless run before scoring the first goal in his fourth appearance on 4 March, where he netted the second of the 2–0 home win against Iliria Fushë-Krujë.

However that goal was to open the floodgates of the strikers scoring in Albanian First Division, including three strikers in April against Besa Kavajë, Kamza, and Iliria Fushë-Krujë. On 2 May, Bajić scored the quickest goal in Albanian First Division history, finding the net after just 36 seconds to help the team to beat Adriatiku Mamurras 1–0 in the matchday 25.

In the penultimate week of the season Bajić scored a brace in a 5–0 home win against Veleçiku Koplik, and finished the second part of the season with 7 goal in 13 appearances. The team finished second in the Group A, failing to secure a spot in Albanian Superliga next season.

Following the end of the season, Bajić agreed a contract extension, signing until June 2016. He started his second season with the club on strong fashion, scoring a hat-trick in matchday 3 against Besa Kavajë for a 4–0 home win, helping the team to take the lead of the league. He enjoyed a prolific form in the first months of the season, scoring the winner against the rivals of Kastrioti Krujë for a 2–1 win in the returning leg of 2015–16 Albanian Cup first round, as the team were eliminated by away goal rule, losing the first match 1–0. Back in league, Bajić scored two more in a 4–0 triumph against Adriatiku Mamurras, taking his tally up to 5 goals.

He started the 2016 in style, scoring a hat-trick in a 4–0 home win against Kazma in the matchday 15. In March, Bajić scored two braces in the 4–0 victories against Ada Velipojë on 6th and 19th. In the penultimate week of the season, Bajić made history by scoring all six goals of his team in a 6–7 home defeat to Adriatiku Mamurras, taking his tally up to 23 goals. With 23 league goals, Bajić clinched the Golden Boot as the league top goalscorer, scoring one more than Erzeni Shijak's Ermir Rezi. Besëlidhja Lezhë once again failed to secure a spot in Albanian Superliga for the next season.

Bajić kicked off his third Besëlidhja Lezhë season on 24 September 2016 by playing full-90 minutes in a 0–1 win at Besa Kavajë. He also played in the two-legged tie against Erzeni valid for the first round of Albanian Cup, scoring in the second leg to help Besëlidhja progress to the next round with the aggregate 5–3. He netted his first league strike of the season on 12 October in the 2–3 win against Erzeni, scoring the third of the match. Ten days later, Bajić was again on target, scoring the lone goal in the last moments of the match against Kastrioti Krujë, lifting his team in the second position.

In July 2020, Bajić joined Zvijezda Gradačac from Bosnian second-tier rivals Bratstvo Gračanica.

== Career statistics ==
As of 22 October 2016

Club	Season	League			Cup		Continental (Note: Including continental competitions, such as UEFA Champions League and UEFA Europa League)		Other (Note: Including other competitions, such as Albanian Supercup)		Total	
Club	Season	Division	Apps	Goals	Apps	Goals	Apps	Goals	Apps	Goals	Apps	Goals
Jedinstvo Užice	2012–13	Serbian First League	15	2	0	0	—		—		15	2
Jedinstvo Užice	2013–14	Serbian First League	2	0	0	0	—		—		2	0
Jedinstvo Užice	Total		17	2	0	0	—		—		17	2
Jagodina	2013–14	Serbian SuperLiga	1	0	0	0	—		—		1	0
Jagodina	Total		1	0	0	0	—		—		1	0
Rudar Pljevlja	2013–14	Montenegrin First League	8	3	0	0	—		—		8	3
Rudar Pljevlja	Total		8	3	0	0	—		—		8	3
Besëlidhja Lezhë	2014–15	Albanian First Division	13	7	0	0	—		—		13	7
Besëlidhja Lezhë	2015–16	Albanian First Division	23	23	2	1	—		—		25	24
Besëlidhja Lezhë	2015–16	Albanian First Division	4	2	2	1	—		—		6	3
Besëlidhja Lezhë	Total		40	32	4	2	—		—		44	34
Career total			66	37	4	2	0	0	0	0	70	39

== Honours ==
- Albanian First Division Top Goalscorer: 2015–16 season (23 goals)
