= Torcida Mitrovicë =

Sport ultras group

- Founded: 20 March 1984; 42 years ago
- Type: Ultras group
- Team: KF Trepça; KB Trepça; KH Trepça All clubs with name Trepça; Albania national team
- Location: Mitrovica, Kosovo
- Arena: Adem Jashari Olympic Stadium; Minatori Sports Hall
- Colors
- Affiliations: Torcida Bair, Mitroboys, Djemt e Veriut, Miner Boys, Green Elite, N.F.T., Torcida Tavnik, Waganica, 02 Ultras

Torcida Mitrovicë, also known as Torcida 1984, is an ultras group in Mitrovica, Kosovo. Torcida are one of the major sports fan groups in Kosovo and one of the largest in Southeast Europe. Founded in 1984, they are the oldest Albanian ultra group.

== History ==
The beginnings of the supporters group can be traced back to the 1970s when KF Trepça played in the Yugoslav First League. Torcida first appeared on stage in 1981 with its banners Armata e Minatoreve, Vëllëzërit Shqiptarë Torcida in the handball match Trepca-Vardari in a great atmosphere where Trepca won this important match. After the match, the two leaders, Qeti and Xhelali, were imprisoned because of the banners with the inscription "Torcida". After being released from prison, the banners with the name Torcida did not appear on stage for a long time. On 20 March 1984, Shefqet Begu, also known as Qeti, officially founded Torcida Mitrovicë. His inspiration came from Torcida Split, the oldest European ultras, of which he was a member.

After the start of the cultural oppression of the ethnic Albanian population, Torcida Mitrovicë also started to support other Kosovan sports teams and contributed to the independent sports leagues. Many members later joined the Kosovo Liberation Army. One of them was Besim Nuka who was killed in action against the Serbian forces in the Battle of Koshare and was posthumously declared a Hero of Kosovo.

After the War, Torcida Mitrovicë regularly supported the Trepça clubs and even the Albania national team against England in 2001 being the first supporters group from Kosovo to do so.

== Politics ==
Since their foundation Torcida Mitrovicë promotes Greater Albania and seeks for Unification of Albania and Kosovo. They criticize the division of Mitrovica and opposed the Kosovo–Serbia land swap.

== Relations with other supporters ==
=== Rivalries ===
Their biggest rival are Plisat. The rivalry is the most known rivalry in Kosovo due to the history of both clubs. It started in 1945 when Trepça and Prishtina were the dominant clubs in the Kosovo Province League. There were several incidents between Torcida and Plisat, Prishtina's supporters club. The incident which made the most headlines was the incident in Elbasan in 2015 where ten fans were arrested and four fans ended up injured. Another rival is Forca from Vushtrri.

=== Brother Groups ===
Their brother group is Ilirët from Kumanovë. They also have good relations with Ballistët from Tetovë Ujqërit e Dëborës from Korçë.and xhebrailat from Suhareka.
