= Cate Fonseca =

Brazilian footballer (born 1979)

Personal information
- Full name: Caterziane Fonseca Ferreira
- Date of birth: 8 March 1979 (age 47)
- Place of birth: Icatu, Maranhão, Brazil
- Height: 1.80 m (5 ft 11 in)
- Position: Midfielder

Team information
- Current team: PAOK Kos
- Number: 10

Senior career*
Years	Team	Apps	(Gls)
2002–2004	Maranatha FC		
2004	Ethnikos Asteras		
2005–2007	Agios Dimitrios F.C.		
2007–2008	Olympiacos Volos	26	(5)
2008–2010	Kalamata F.C.		
2011	Fokikos		
2011–2012	Diagoras FC		
2013	Luftëtari Gjirokastër	10	(4)
2013	Kastrioti Krujë	8	(0)
2014	KS Lushnja	11	(4)
2014 – 2015	Adriatiku Mamurrasi	26	(18)
2015	FC Kamza	14	(3)
2015 – 2016	GAS Ialysos	15	(5)
2016 – 2018	Episkopi F.C.		
2018	Thinaliakos FC		
2018 – 2019	Antimachos Kos	25	(11)
2019 – 2020	AE Kos	22	(12)
2020 – 2022	AO Pyliou Kos	2	(1)
2022 – 2023	Anagennis Asfendou	15	(10)
2023 – 2024	PAOK Kos	14	(4)
- * Club domestic league appearances and goals

Caterziane Fonseca Ferreira (born 8 March 1979), known as Cate Fonseca, is Brazilian footballer who currently plays for Adriatiku Mamurrasi in the Albanian First Division.
