= Arlind Ferhati =

Albanian footballer

Personal information
- Full name: Arlind Ferhati
- Date of birth: 20 January 1994 (age 32)
- Place of birth: Shkodër, Albania
- Height: 1.86 m (6 ft 1 in)
- Position: Forward

Youth career
- 2005–2011: Rosemont
- 2012: Santegidiese
- 2013: Dinamo Tirana

Senior career*
Years	Team	Apps	(Gls)
2013–2014	Dinamo Tirana	23	(1)
2014–2015	Ada	24	(7)
2015–2017	Besëlidhja	3	(1)
2019	Real Mississauga SC		
- * Club domestic league appearances and goals as of 26 September 2019

Alind Ferhati (born 20 January 1994) is an Albanian footballer who plays as a forward.

== Playing career ==
Ferhati played in the Albanian Superliga with FK Dinamo Tirana. In 2014, he played with KF Ada Velipojë, and later with Besëlidhja Lezhë. In 2019, he played abroad in the Canadian Soccer League with SC Real Mississauga.
