= Mikel Spaho =

Albanian footballer

Personal information
- Full name: Mikel Spaho
- Date of birth: 30 August 1982 (age 44)
- Place of birth: Lushnjë, Albania
- Position: Goalkeeper

Senior career*
Years	Team	Apps	(Gls)
2000–2009	Lushnja	107	(0)
2009–2012	Flamurtari	20	(0)
2012–2019	Lushnja	166	(0)
Total		293	(0)
- * Club domestic league appearances and goals as of 13:45 13 November 2010 (GMT)

Mikel Spaho (born 30 August 1982 in Lushnjë) is an Albanian footballer who most recently played as a goalkeeper for Lushnja in the Albanian First Division.
