= Bekim Bejta =

Kosovar linguist

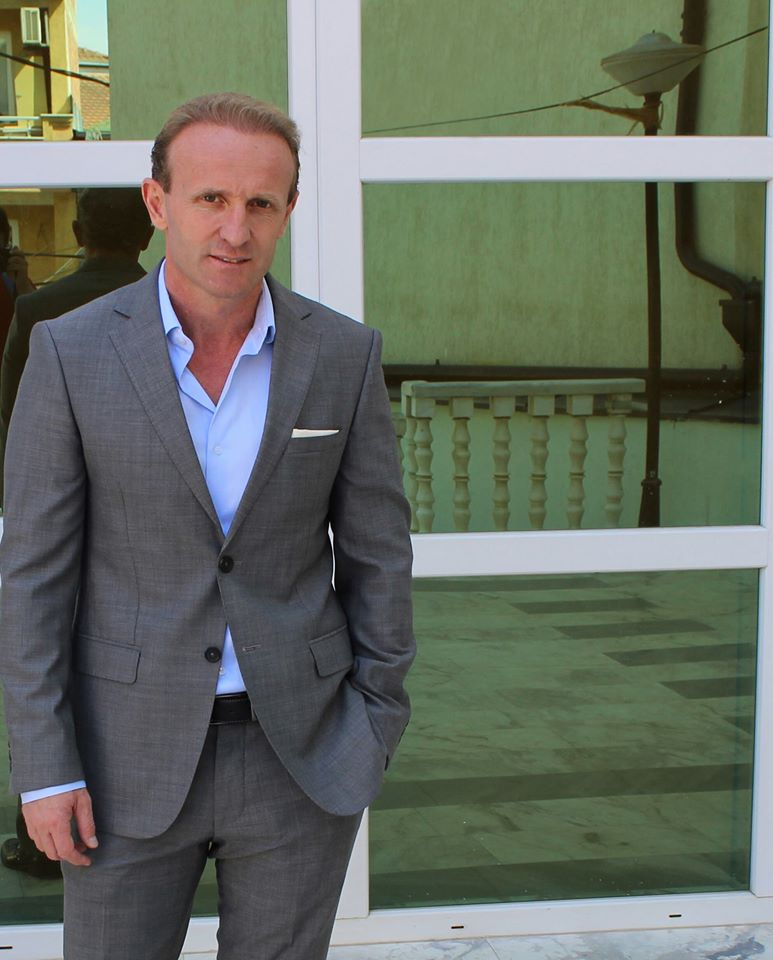
Bekim Bejta

Bekim Bejta (born 11 June 1970 in Kosovo - Mitrovica) is a Kosovar Albanian linguist, poet and translator. In 2009, he received the Kosovo National Literary Prize for the translation of Raga. Approche du continent invisible by Jean-Marie Gustave Le Clézio.

== Career ==
Bejta’s started with publishing The Solution to English Word-Stress (2003). The counterpart of this book in French is his work L’Accentuation en anglais(2003). In 2007, he published, in Albanian, the work Gjuha dhe të folurit (Language and Speech). Then, two linguistic books of his were published in Pristina, Analyse phonologique des emprunts en anglais, (2009), and Naturalisation morpho-sémantique des xénismes an anglais (2009). More recently he has published two linguistics books - namely, "English Orthoepy" and "Adyghe Phonemics", both of which were published in Paris.

== Bibliography ==
=== Linguistic books ===
- The Solution to English Word-Stress, 2003, L`Harmattan, Paris, Torino, Budapest.
- L`accentuation en anglais, 2003, L`Harmattan, Paris, Torino.
- Gjuha dhe të folurit, 2007, Buzuku, Prishtinë.
- Analyse phonologique des emprunts en anglais, 2009, Buzuku, Prishtinë.
- Naturalisation morpho-sémantique des xénismes an anglais, 2009, Buzuku, Prishtinë.
- English Orthoepy, 2022, St. Honore, Paris.
- Adyghe Phonemics, 2022, St. Honore, Paris.

=== Translations ===
(From English into Albanian)

- Mjeshtërit e të jashtëzakonshmes, 2007, Buzuku, Prishtinë (translation of a short story collection: from English into Albanian) - Washington Irving, Ambrose Bierce, Edgar Allan Poe, William Hope Hodgson, Oscar Wilde, Howard Phillips Lovecraft, Jack London.
- Novela anglo-amerikane të shekullit XX, 2007, Buzuku, Prishtinë (translation of a short story collection: from English into Albanian) - Graham Greene, Roald Dahl, Katherine Mansfield, Jim Phelan, Osbert Sitwell, Elizabeth Taylor, W. Somerset Maugham, Mary Webb, Patricia Highsmith, O`Henry, Ray Bradbury, Truman Capote, Evelyn Waugh, F. Scott Fitzgerald, Bernard Malamud.
- Novela moderne anglo-amerikane, 2008, Buzuku, Prishtinë (translation of a short story collection: from English into Albanian) - Iain Crichton Smith, H.-E. Bates, Mary Bowen, Truman Capote, Dylan Thomas, Saki, Liam O’Flaherty, Graham Greene, James Thurber, Ernest Hemingway, Ray Bradbury.
- John Updike, My Father’s Tears (Lotët e babait tim), Buzuku, 2009, Prishtinë.
- John Updike, Facing Nature (Përballë natyrës), 2009, Buzuku, Prishtinë.
- William Shakespeare, Coriolanus (Koriolani), 2009, Buzuku, Prishtinë.
- William Shakespeare, The Comedy of Errors (Komedia e lajthitjeve), 2009, Buzuku, Prishtinë.
- William Shakespeare, Venus and Adonis (Venusi dhe Adonisi), 2009, Buzuku, Prishtinë.

(From French into Albanian)

- Pascale Roze, Le Chasseur Zéro, (Gjuajtësi zero), 2008, Buzuku, Prishtinë.
- J.M.G. Le Clézio, Raga, 2008, Buzuku, Prishtinë..
