= KS Lushnja =

Albanian football club

Lushnja
- Full name: Klubi Sportiv Lushnja
- Nicknames: Delegatët; Lagunarët; Traktori
- Founded: 27 July 1930; 96 years ago as Kongresi i Lushnjës
- Ground: Roza Haxhiu Stadium
- Capacity: 8,000
- Owner: Lushnjë Municipality
- Manager: Dorian Bubeqi
- League: Kategoria e Dytë, Group B
- 2025−26: Kategoria e Parë, 12th (relegated)
Home colours	Away colours

Klubi Sportiv Lushnja is an Albanian football club based in the city of Lushnjë in the County of Fier. Their home ground is the Abdurrahman Roza Haxhiu Stadium and they currently compete in the Kategoria e Dytë.

== History ==
=== Early years ===
The club was originally formed in 1930 and the first football game held in the city of Lushnjë was played shortly after. This was a friendly game against Tomori Berat and the team consisted of young men from Lushnjë. The club was named Kongresi i Lushnjës following a proposal from a member of parliament and signatory of the Albanian Declaration of Independence Ferit Vokopola to name the club after the Congress of Lushnjë, which was where Vokopola himself was elected secretary. In 1927, a young man named Ali Funga returned from his studies in Austria and joined the club as a player and the head coach. He returned to Albania from Austria with shirts that would be used by the club, and they had green vertical stripes which were used to symbolise the fields of Myzeqe. Although the club was formed on 21 January 1927 it was not "officially" formed until 27 July 1930 shortly after the formation of the Albanian Football Association a month earlier. It was known then as the Kongresi i Lushnjës (English: Congress of Lushnjë) literacy-artistic society, in reference to the important political meeting of 1920. The club's first official jerseys were green, and the first sports chief of the club was Ali Funga, who had been a key member of the club's pre formation years.

=== Traktori Lushnja ===
In 1945, they changed their name to KS Traktori Lushnja followed by a further name change in 1950 to SK Lushnja. In 1951, it was changed to Puna Lushnja, before they returned to KS Traktori Lushnja in 1958. Following the fall of communism in 1991, the club was named KS Lushnja. Argentinian World Cup-winning forward Mario Kempes made his full-time coaching debut in Albania with a brief spell at the club in 1997.

=== Modern day ===
The team had a good reputation at the start of 1991 when the communism regime collapsed and before it. The team was in the Albanian Superliga for many times and came in and out many times. The most Notable Manager known as Mario Kempes in 1997. Since the start of the team they never were in a European Championship. In 2017 the team has been losing many of its games in the 2017-18 Albanian Superliga causing a lot of fans to leave and the team having a bad reputation with the most losses in the group.

== Supporters ==
Ultras Delegatët
- Established: 21 January 2012; 14 years ago
- Type: Supporters' group
- Club: KS Lushnja
- Motto: Përtej rezultatit (Albanian: Beyond the result)
- Headquarters: Lushnjë, Albania
- Affiliations: Tifozat Kuq e Zi

The club's main supporters' group is called the Ultras Delegatët, which was formed on 21 January 2012, on the 85th anniversary of the club. Delegatët took over as the club's main supporters' group from the previous group which was called the Lushnja Warrios. There are other small ultras like Ultras Stan Karbunarë and Ultras Karbunarë.

=== Groups ===
- Ultras Delegatët
- Ultras Stan Karbunarë
- Ultras Karbunarë
- Lushnja Warrios
- Tifoza e Lushnjes

== Stadium ==
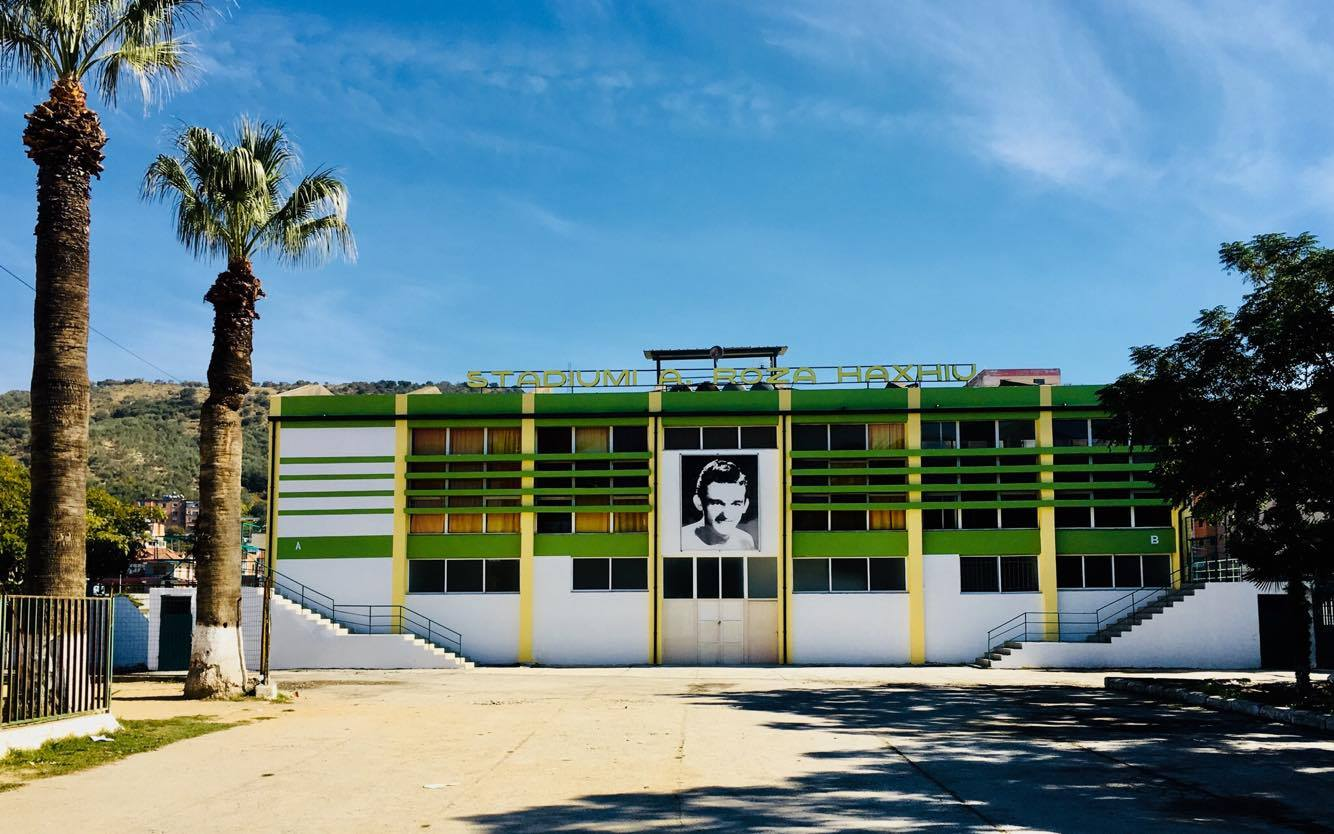
Stadiumi A.Roza Haxhiu

Abdurrahman Roza Haxhiu Stadium is Home to the team known as KS Lushnja. This is an 8,000 seater but it has a capacity of 12,000 people. The stadium was made in 1861 during the communism. The stadium is named after a famous soccer player known as Abdurrahman Roza Haxhiu who died during a match. Since the stadium was created in communism era of Albania the stadium was solid and had a big capacity to sit and to stand up. Other village teams around Lushnje play some championships and friendlies. There has been an international game with Albania national under-19 football team vs Kazakhstan national under-19 football team. The latest it was renovated was 2017 to enter the Albanian Superliga with seats in the VIP area.

=== Renovations ===
Abdurrahman Roza Haxhiu stadium has been renovated a couple of times. The latest renovation was for the 2017-18 Albanian Superliga, as they were qualified they needed to renovate the stadium. The stadium had fresh paint and the plastic seats in the VIP Area were fixed along with the field.

== Sponsors ==
Sponsor Type	Name
Main Sponsors	Municipality of Lushnje
Secondary Sponsors	Lufra, Kond
Official clothing provider	Legea

== Honours ==
- Kategoria e Parë
  - Winners (6): 1960, 1981–82, 1987–88, 1989–90, 1995–96, 2012–13
- Albanian Cup
  - Runners-up (2): 1997–98, 1999–00

== Current squad ==
As of 7 August 2025

Note: Flags indicate national team as defined under FIFA eligibility rules; some limited exceptions apply. Players may hold more than one non-FIFA nationality.

No.	Pos.	Nation	Player
—	GK	ALB	Saugli Alimuçaj
1	GK	ALB	Oltjan Haremi
—	DF	ALB	Endrien Magani
—	DF	ALB	Kledis Hida
—	DF	ALB	Fadil Meta
—	DF	ALB	Ilir Allmuca
—	MF	ALB	Erald Hyseni
—	MF	KOS	Gentrit Olluri
—	MF	ALB	Fjoralb Deliaj

No.	Pos.	Nation	Player
—	MF	ALB	Ersi Zaganjori
—	FW	ALB	Albi Xhabrahimi
—	FW	ALB	Serxhio Tabaku
—	FW	ALB	Redi Kaçanolli
—	FW	NGR	Odirah Ntephe
—	FW	ITA	Salvatore Ribaudo
—	FW	ALB	Mikel Canka
—	FW	LBR	Jerryson Willie
—	FW	CIV	Ibrahim Olola

=== Out on loan ===
Note: Flags indicate national team as defined under FIFA eligibility rules; some limited exceptions apply. Players may hold more than one non-FIFA nationality.

No.	Pos.	Nation	Player
—	FW	ALB	Ledion Sadiku (at Labëria until 30 June 2024)

== List of managers ==
- (Albania) Abdurrahman Roza Haxhiu (Jan 1960 - Dec 1960)
- (Albania) Adem Karapici (1 Jan 1961 - 1 Jul 1964)
- (Albania) Xhevdet Shaqiri (1960s)
- (Albania) Bahri Ishka
- (Albania) Zihni Gjinali
- (Albania) Leonidha Çuri (1988–1990)
- (Albania) Agim Mone (1990–1991)
- (Albania) Xhavit Sefa (1992–1993)
- (Albania) Lazar Dushi (1993–1994)
- (Albania) Adnan Haxhiu (1994–1996)
- (Albania) Hasan Lika (Jul 1996 - Dec 1996)
- (Argentina) Mario Kempes (Dec 1996 - 1 Feb 1997)
- (Albania) Adnan Haxhiu (1997–1998)
- (Albania) Ilir Gjyla (1998–1999)
- (Albania) Hysen Dedja (1999–2000)
- (Albania) Edmond Gëzdari (2000)
- (Albania) Hysen Dedja (2001)
- (Albania) Ilir Gjyla (2001)
- (Albania) Agim Mone (1 Jul 2002 - 3 Nov 2002)
- (Albania) Kristaq Mile (30 Nov 2002 - 1 Jul 2003)
- (Romania) Aurel Țicleanu (1 Jul 2003 - 18 Oct 2003)
- (Albania) Agim Canaj (25 Oct 2003 - 10 Apr 2004)
- (Albania) Ilir Gjyla (14 Apr 2004 - Jun 2004)
- (Albania) Lazar Dushi (Jul 2004 – 1 Sep 2004)
- (Albania) Sulejman Demollari (1 Sep 2004 – 21 Feb 2005)
- (Albania) Mirel Josa (21 Feb 2005 – 1 Jul 2005)
- (Albania) Perlat Sevo (Jul 2005 – 20 Jan 2006)
- (Albania) Artan Bano (22 Jan 2006 - 9 Feb 2006)
- (Albania) Sulejman Demollari (15 Feb 2006 – 10 Mar 2006)
- (Albania) Artan Bano (12 Mar 2006 – Jun 2008)
- (Albania) Saimir Malko (Jul 2008 - 26 Oct 2008)
- (Albania) Vasil Bici (26 Oct 2008 – 2 Jan 2009)
- (Albania) Ilir Gjyla (2 Jan 2009 - May 2009)
- (Albania) Saimir Malko (Oct 2011 - Jun 2012)
- (Albania) Artan Bano (Jul 2012 - Oct 2017)
- (Albania) Hysen Dedja (Nov 2017 - Feb 2018)
- (Albania) Ilir Gjyla (Mar 2018 – Dec 2021)
- (Albania) Mikel Spaho (Dec 2021 – Jan 2022)
- (Albania) Agim Canaj (Jan 2022 – Jun 2022)
- (Albania) Klodian Duro (Jun 2022 – Oct 2022)
- (Albania) Edlir Tetova (Oct 2022 – Nov 2022)
- (Albania) Blerim Hasalla (Nov 2022 – Jan 2023)
- (Albania) Klevis Dalipi (Jan 2023 – Jun 2023)
- (Albania) Gugash Magani (Jun 2023 – Oct 2024)
- (Albania) Mikel Spaho (Oct 2024 – Oct 2024)
- (Albania) Erjon Xhafa (Oct 2024 – Sep 2025)
- (Albania) Ditmar Bicaj (Sep 2025 – Dec 2025)
- (Albania) Artan Bano (Jan 2026 – Jun 2026)
- (Albania) Mikel Spaho (Jul 2026 – Aug 2026)
- (Albania) Dorian Bubeqi (Aug 2026 –)
