= KF Shkëndija =

Macedonian association football club

Shkëndija
- Full name: Klubi i Futbollit Shkëndija; Фудбалски Клуб Шкендија
- Nickname: Balli (The Ball)
- Founded: 27 August 1979; 47 years ago
- Ground: City Stadium Gostivar, Gostivar (temporarily)
- Capacity: 4,000
- Owner: Ecolog International
- Chairman: Zamir Dika
- Manager: Artim Pollozhani
- League: Macedonian First League
- 2025–26: Macedonian First League 2nd of 12
- Website: kfshkendija.com
Home colours	Away colours

Klubi i Futbollit Shkëndija (Macedonian: Фудбалски клуб Шкендија), commonly known as Shkëndija, is a professional football club from Tetovo, North Macedonia. Founded in 1979 by members of the local Albanian community, the club is closely associated with red-and-black colours and the ultras group Ballistët. Shkëndija play home matches at the modern Ecolog Arena in Tetovo and, since August 2013, have operated under the ownership of the Tetovo-based company Ecolog International.

After being dissolved in the early 1980s, the club was re-established in 1992 following Macedonian independence and climbed back through the domestic pyramid, earning a first promotion to the top flight in 1996–97. Shkëndija won their first national championship in the 2010–11 season with 72 points (21–9–3) and lifted the inaugural Macedonian Football Supercup a few weeks later. Sustained investment in the mid-2010s turned the club into a regular contender; league titles followed in 2017–18, 2018–19, 2020–21 and 2024–25.

Internationally, Shkëndija debuted in the 2011–12 UEFA Champions League qualifiers and have twice reached the UEFA Europa League play-off round (2016–17, 2017–18), losing to Gent and Milan respectively. Their deepest Champions League run came in 2018–19, eliminating The New Saints and Sheriff before falling to Salzburg in Q3 and then to Rosenborg in the Europa League play-off. In the 2020–21 Q3 they hosted Tottenham Hotspur in Skopje (1–3), a match preceded by a goalframe measurement controversy that led to the replacement of undersized posts. In 2025–26 qualifying, Shkëndija beat The New Saints in Q1 and upset FCSB in Q2 (3–1 agg.) to reach Q3.

Shkëndija's principal rivalry is the Tetovo derby with FK Teteks, which has produced several high-risk fixtures and the 2013 cup final abandonment; derbies are also contested with FK Renova, FK Vardar, and KF Shkupi.

== History ==
=== Establishment ===
KF Shkëndija was founded on 27 August 1979 in Tetovo by ethnic Albanians, emerging from a local multi-sport society and adopting red-and-black as club colours. Starting in the municipal league, the club drew large local support and quickly climbed the Yugoslav pyramid; contemporary club records note the first official match finished 4–0 for Shkëndija against FK Kosmos. As its popularity grew among Albanians in SR Macedonia, authorities in socialist Yugoslavia came to view the club through a nationalist lens; Shkëndija was dissolved in the early 1980s and remained inactive for the rest of the decade. The club was re-established in 1992 following Macedonian independence and began its climb back through the domestic league system.

=== Re-establishment and rise (1992–2010) ===
Following Macedonian independence in 1991, Shkëndija was re-established in 1992 and restarted in the lower regional leagues. By 1994–95 the club was competing in the Second League (West), finishing runners-up behind Makedonija Skopje. The following season Shkëndija won the West group and earned promotion, appearing in the 1996–97 First League before being relegated at the end of that campaign. After several seasons yo-yoing between the top two tiers, Shkëndija again won the Second League (West) in 1999–2000 to return to the top flight. The club also made its first national cup final in 2005–06, losing 3–2 to Makedonija G.P. in Skopje. Shkëndija captured the Second League title again in 2009–10 to earn promotion ahead of their breakthrough 2010–11 championship season. During this period the ultras group Ballistët was formally established (1992) and became a defining feature of the club's support.

=== First championship and European debut (2010–2013) ===
In the 2010–11 season, newly promoted Shkëndija won their first national title, finishing top with 72 points (21–9–3). The triumph brought a first appearance in UEFA competitions, where Shkëndija faced FK Partizan in the 2011–12 UEFA Champions League second qualifying round, losing 0–5 on aggregate (0–4 in Belgrade, 0–1 in Skopje). Domestically, Shkëndija won the inaugural Macedonian Football Supercup by defeating Metalurg 2–1 on 24 July 2011 at the national arena in Skopje. The club finished third in the 2011–12 league with 66 points. The following year brought turbulence: in September 2012 UEFA temporarily withheld Shkëndija's European prize money under new financial-fair-play measures, and on 1 August 2013 the Tetovo-based company Ecolog International formally took charge of the club after a supporter-led campaign amid financial strain.

=== Ecolog era and domestic success (2013–present) ===
During the 2012–13 season, Shkëndija was embroiled in financial difficulties and as a result, many of its players left the club earlier in the summer. The Shkëndija supporters, the Ballistët, began a social media campaign requesting Ecolog to take over Shkëndija. Albanian international, Lorik Cana and Swiss international, Xherdan Shaqiri also joined the campaign with the supporters. On 31 July 2013, Lazim Destani, father of Ecolog founder and chairman, Nazif Destani, announced Ecolog International will take charge of Shkëndija.

With increased investment, Shkëndija rebuilt its squad and cycled through several managers in the following years. Shpëtim Duro took over in December 2015 and led the club until December 2016. After a brief return by Jeton Bekjiri and a short stint by Bruno Akrapović, Thomas Brdarić was appointed in January 2017. He was succeeded by Qatip Osmani, with Osmani eventually leading the team to its most dominant period. Under Osmani, Shkëndija won back-to-back league titles in 2017–18 and 2018–19, and completed the domestic double in 2018.

The club also had its most notable European campaigns in this period. Shkëndija reached the UEFA Europa League play-offs twice (2016–17, 2017–18) and participated in the 2018–19 UEFA Champions League qualifiers, reaching the third round before being eliminated by Red Bull Salzburg.

In October 2019, Albanian coach Ernest Gjoka took over and guided Shkëndija to their fourth league title in the 2020–21 season. Gjoka departed in August 2021 and was succeeded by Bruno Akrapović, who led the club until April 2022. Artim Šakiri briefly managed the club before Qatip Osmani returned in September 2022 and remained until May 2023.

In June 2023, former Macedonian international Ardian Nuhiu was appointed as manager. He led the team through the first half of the 2023–24 season before departing in December 2023. On 13 May 2025, Shkëndija secured the Macedonian First League title for the fifth time in the club's history following a 2–1 home victory over FK Rabotnicki. The Tetovo-based club was declared champion with two rounds remaining in the season.

In July 2025, Shkëndija eliminated FCSB 3–1 on aggregate (1–0 at the Toše Proeski Arena in Skopje and 2–1 at the Arena Națională in Bucharest) in the 2025–26 UEFA Champions League second qualifying round, advancing to the third qualifying round for the first time; the result was reported as a historic upset for the Tetovo club. Under UEFA's new format, teams losing in the UCL play-off round move into the UEFA Europa League league phase; thus, reaching the play-off would guarantee Shkëndija a first-ever appearance in a major European league phase.

In the third qualifying round of the 2025–26 UEFA Champions League, Shkëndija were eliminated by Qarabağ with a 6–1 aggregate score. After a narrow 1–0 defeat away, they suffered a heavy 5–1 loss in the return leg in Baku, confirming elimination at this stage.

Shkëndija moved into the UEFA Europa League play-off round, where they faced Ludogorets Razgrad. The Tetovo side put up a strong fight in the first leg, winning 2–1 at home. However, their campaign ended after a 4–1 defeat (after extra time) in the return leg in Razgrad, resulting in a 5–3 aggregate loss. Despite the elimination, Shkëndija's European journey continued—instead of exiting completely, they secured a place in the UEFA Europa Conference League group stage, marking the first time the club would compete in a major European league format.

== Supporters ==
The main supporters of Shkëndija are the Ballistët, an ultras group from Tetovo founded in 1992 whose name references the World War II Albanian nationalist movement Balli Kombëtar. They follow the club at the Ecolog Arena and are noted for politically charged tifos and large away followings.

Notable incidents include the abandonment of the 2012–13 Macedonian Cup final between Shkëndija and FK Teteks amid nationalist chanting (the rematch was ordered behind closed doors), a 19 October 2014 display during the derby with FK Vardar showing a banner reading "They are cancer of Europe – UEFA do you need more?!" in reference to the Serbia–Albania match controversy, and a mass fight on 21 February 2016 near Skopje involving Shkëndija fans and Budućnost Podgorica’s ultras Varvari.

In April 2025, the Football Federation of Macedonia sanctioned Shkëndija with several home matches behind closed doors and a fine following improper fan conduct; the punishment was later reduced on appeal. Despite periodic controversy, Ballistët remain central to Shkëndija's matchday culture and the club's Albanian fan base in North Macedonia.

== Stadium ==
Shkëndija play home matches at the Ecolog Arena in Tetovo, formerly known as Tetovo City Stadium (Macedonian: Gradski stadion Tetovo). The ground is owned by the Municipality of Tetovo and operated by Ecolog International; it dates to 1981 and has a capacity of about 15,000.

In late 2023 the Municipality of Tetovo gave the go-ahead for a major reconstruction/new-stadium project (estimated at €9.7 million) intended to bring the venue to international standard and host national-team matches in Tetovo. A public tender for reconstruction followed, and on 18 March 2024 the municipality (via NP "Transport Tetovë") signed a contract with "E-Properties," a company owned by Ecolog International, covering construction/reconstruction of the city stadium, sports centre and football field (contract value €11.5 million). Local media reporting on the presented concept referred to the project as "Arena Tetovare" and indicated a capacity around 12,000 seats, to be delivered with Ecolog's backing and municipal support.

In mid-2025 KOHA reported that renovation works at the city stadium were scheduled to begin in the autumn, with Shkëndija meanwhile staging some UEFA fixtures at Skopje's national Toše Proeski Arena.

== Crest and colours ==
Shkëndija's traditional colours are red and black, adopted at the club's founding and closely tied to the Albanian community identity in Tetovo. The home kit has typically featured red-and-black striping, while recent away kits are predominantly white; third kits vary by season. According to kit databases, Shkëndija have worn Macron since 2015 (previously Nike).

The club crest is an elongated oval with a black border: the upper field is white with the inscription “KF SHKËNDIJA,” a classic football appears centrally, and a red scroll with “TETOVË 1979” overlays red-and-black vertical stripes in the lower half. In the 2010s a version of the badge began to be used with a gold five-pointed star above the oval.

== Rivalries ==
Shkëndija's principal rivalry is the Tetovo derby against city neighbours FK Teteks. The match carries an ethnic dimension (Teteks supported largely by ethnic Macedonians, Shkëndija by ethnic Albanians) and is classed among North Macedonia's established derbies. Encounters have frequently been designated "high risk" and have seen crowd incidents and federation sanctions, including a disorder-marred league meeting in August 2010 and subsequent punishments for both clubs. The rivalry peaked at national level in the 2013 Cup final, which was abandoned after 20 minutes due to nationalist chanting and replayed behind closed doors; Teteks won the re-staged final on penalties.

Shkëndija also contests a local derby with FK Renova, another Tetovo-area club; media and match reports regularly describe their meetings as a "Tetovo derby".

At national level, matches with FK Vardar are often framed as a leading title-race rivalry and have periodically been played under sanctions. Notable flashpoints include the 19 October 2014 game when Shkëndija's ultras displayed a provocative banner about Serbian hooliganism, and a Football Federation of Macedonia ruling for one match behind closed doors after incidents in the Vardar derby in 2016. The fixture has also produced emphatic scorelines in Shkëndija's favour in the 2010s.

Shkëndija also maintains a heated rivalry with KF Shkupi of Skopje. Because both clubs draw predominantly Albanian support—Ballistët (Shkëndija) and "Shvercerat" (Shkupi)—local media often label the fixture the "Albanian derby," and authorities frequently classify it as high-risk. A notable flashpoint came in the Macedonian Cup quarter-final on 9 November 2022 at Čair, when the match was abandoned in the 9th minute after a pitch invasion moments after Dashmir Elezi had put Shkëndija ahead; the Football Federation of Macedonia awarded a 3–0 win to Shkëndija and suspended Shkupi's ground. Results have swung both ways: Shkupi beat Shkëndija 2–0 in Kičevo on 19 February 2023, while Shkëndija won 2–0 in Tetovo on 27 November 2024; several meetings have ended level, including a 1–1 draw in September 2021. However, in 2022 the 2 ultra groups declared good relations after a meeting in Prekaz.

== Players ==
=== Current squad ===
As of 7 August 2026

Note: Flags indicate national team as defined under FIFA eligibility rules; some limited exceptions apply. Players may hold more than one non-FIFA nationality.

No.	Pos.	Nation	Player
2	DF	ALB	Aleksandër Trumçi
5	MF	KOS	Drilon Islami
7	FW	MKD	Besart Ibraimi (captain)
8	MF	BRA	Rafa
9	FW	GAB	Fahd Ndzengue
10	MF	KOS	Endrit Krasniqi
11	MF	KOS	Almir Kryeziu
16	DF	MKD	Mevlan Murati
17	MF	ALB	Arbin Zejnullai (vice-captain)
18	DF	MKD	Nazif Ceka
19	FW	MKD	Vane Krstevski
20	MF	MKD	Lirian Xheladini
21	MF	MKD	Armir Isa

No.	Pos.	Nation	Player
23	DF	MKD	Bojan Dimoski
24	GK	GAM	Baboucarr Gaye
25	GK	MKD	Astrit Amzai
26	DF	MKD	Anes Meliqi
29	FW	SEN	Fabrice Tamba
30	GK	MKD	Ferat Ramani
33	DF	MKD	Anes Abdurahmani
35	FW	MKD	Flori Ilazi
40	GK	MKD	Rinor Ceka
49	MF	ALB	Sebastjan Spahiu
55	DF	MKD	Jovan Manev
77	MF	MKD	Florent Ramadani
99	FW	MKD	Marko Gjorgjievski

=== Out on loan ===
Note: Flags indicate national team as defined under FIFA eligibility rules; some limited exceptions apply. Players may hold more than one non-FIFA nationality.

No.	Pos.	Nation	Player

== Notable former players ==
The following former Shkëndija players have made at least one appearance for a senior national team.

=== North Macedonia ===
Player	National team
Besart Abdurahimi	North Macedonia
Almir Bajrami	North Macedonia
Egzon Bejtullai	North Macedonia
Sedat Berisha	North Macedonia
Besmir Bojku	North Macedonia
Zoran Boškovski	North Macedonia
Ardian Cuculi	North Macedonia
Besir Demiri	North Macedonia
Ertan Demiri	North Macedonia
Bojan Dimoski	North Macedonia
Ilir Elmazovski	North Macedonia
Enis Fazlagikj	North Macedonia
Samir Fazli	North Macedonia
Imran Fetai	North Macedonia
Ferhan Hasani	North Macedonia
Agim Ibraimi	North Macedonia
Besart Ibraimi	North Macedonia
Jovan Manev	North Macedonia
Anes Meliqi	North Macedonia
Arbën Nuhiji	North Macedonia
Artim Pollozhani	North Macedonia
Marjan Radeski	North Macedonia
Reshat Ramadani	North Macedonia
Vlatko Stojanovski	North Macedonia
Ennur Totre	North Macedonia

=== Other countries ===
Player	National team
Valon Ahmedi	Albania
Sindrit Guri	Albania
Liridon Latifi	Albania
Kamer Qaka	Albania
Sebastjan Spahiu	Albania
Zajko Zeba	Bosnia and Herzegovina
Mohamadou Idrissou	Cameroon
Fahd Ndzengue	Gabon
Baboucarr Gaye	(The Gambia) Gambia
Pa Omar Jobe	(The Gambia) Gambia
Ardin Dallku	Kosovo
Meriton Korenica	Kosovo
Gjelbrim Taipi	Kosovo
Andre Lomami	Rwanda
Ján Krivák	Slovakia

== Personnel ==
=== Current technical staff ===
As of 15 June 2026

Position	Name
Head coach	(North Macedonia) Artim Pollozhani
Assistant coach	(North Macedonia) Kushtrim Abdullahi
Assistant coach	(North Macedonia) Bekim Osmani
Fitness coach	(North Macedonia) Saimir Fetai
Goalkeeper coach	(North Macedonia) Saladin Mustafi
Physiotherapist	(North Macedonia) Erxhan Rushiti
Physiotherapist	(North Macedonia) Bekim Alija
Physiotherapist	(North Macedonia) Fadil Rustemi
Doctor	(North Macedonia) Dritan Bexheti
Video analyst	(Albania) Kushtrim Voka
Team coordinator	(North Macedonia) Festim Ademi
Economist	(North Macedonia) Ramadan Sinani
Economist	(North Macedonia) Nuredin Rexhepi

=== Management ===
Position	Staff
Owner	(Albania) Lazim Destani
President	(North Macedonia) Zamir Dika
Administration director	(North Macedonia) Lulzim Imeri
Operations director	(North Macedonia) Dritan Musliu
Sporting director	(North Macedonia) Ardian Cuculi
Secretary	(North Macedonia) Erblir Luma

== Honours ==
=== League ===
- 1. MFL:
  - Champions (5): 2010–11, 2017–18, 2018–19, 2020–21, 2024–25
  - Runners-up (4): 2015–16, 2016–17, 2023–24, 2025–26
- 2. MFL:
  - Winners (3): 1995–96, 1999–2000, 2009–10
- 3. MFL:
  - Winners (1): 1993–94

=== Cups ===
- Macedonian Cup:
  - Winners (2): 2015–16, 2017–18
  - Runners-up (4): 2005–06, 2012–13, 2016–17, 2025–26
- Macedonian Football Supercup:
  - Winners (1): 2011

== Results of League and Cup Competitions by season ==
Season	League										Macedonian Cup	European competitions		
Season	Division	Pos	P	W	D	L	GF	GA		Pts	Macedonian Cup	UCL	UEL	UCL
1992–93	MML	1st↑	~~N/A.~~								~~N/A.~~	DNQ		
1993–94	3. MFL	1st↑	~~N/A.~~								~~N/A.~~	DNQ		
1994–95	2. MFL	4th	32	16	6	10	61	38	23	54	~~N/A.~~	DNQ		
1995–96	2. MFL	1st↑	30	19	6	5	65	23	42	63	~~N/A.~~	DNQ		
1996–97	1. MFL	13th↓	26	8	5	13	27	48	−21	29	R2	DNQ		
1997–98	2. MFL	9th	30	11	7	12	32	36	−4	40	~~N/A.~~	DNQ		
1998–99	2. MFL	7th	30	12	6	12	72	45	27	42	~~N/A.~~	DNQ		
1999–00	2. MFL	1st↑	34	24	5	5	97	21	76	78	R1	DNQ		
2000–01	1. MFL	12th↓	26	9	1	16	34	49	−15	28	SF	DNQ		
2001–02	2. MFL	DNQ									R1	DNQ		
2002–03	2. MFL	4th	36	20	6	10	71	42	29	66	PR	DNQ		
2003–04	2. MFL	2nd↑	32	19	5	8	69	44	25	62	R2	DNQ		
2004–05	1. MFL	5th	33	15	5	13	59	40	19	50	R1	DNQ		
2005–06	1. MFL	5th	33	15	4	14	48	47	1	49	RU	DNQ		
2006–07	1. MFL	10th	33	10	8	15	39	63	−24	38	R2	DNQ		
2007–08	1. MFL	11th↓	33	7	5	21	26	58	−32	26	R2	DNQ		
2008–09	2. MFL	3rd	29	15	10	4	67	29	38	55	SF	DNQ		
2009–10	2. MFL	1st↑	26	20	3	3	57	15	42	57	PR	DNQ		
2010–11	1. MFL	1st	33	21	9	3	65	23	42	72	R1	DNQ		
2011–12	1. MFL	3rd	33	20	6	7	53	28	25	66	R2	2QR	—	—
2012–13	1. MFL	5th	33	13	8	12	52	49	3	44	RU	—	1QR	—
2013–14	1. MFL	4th	33	16	9	8	53	32	21	57	QF	—	—	—
2014–15	1. MFL	3rd	32	18	5	9	58	31	27	59	R2	—	1QR	—
2015–16	1. MFL	2nd	32	23	6	3	74	24	50	75	W	—	1QR	—
2016–17	1. MFL	2nd	36	20	10	6	71	39	32	70	RU	—	PO	—
2017–18	1. MFL	1st	36	28	4	3	101	27	74	91	W	—	PO	—
2018–19	1. MFL	1st	36	24	7	5	80	29	51	79	QF	3QR	PO	—
2019–20 (Note: Season abandoned on 4 June 2020 due to COVID-19; table frozen after 23 matches. Vardar declared champions; no relegation. European places assigned by FFM via licensing: Sileks to UCL; Shkëndija, Renova and Shkupi to UEL.)	1. MFL	3rd	23	10	5	8	38	20	18	35	N/A	1QR	2QR	—
2020–21	1. MFL	1st	33	22	9	2	69	26	43	75	QF	—	3QR	—
2021–22	1. MFL	3rd	33	16	13	4	49	25	24	61	QF	1QR	—	2QR
2022–23	1. MFL	3rd	30	16	9	5	43	23	20	57	SF	—	—	3QR
2023–24	1. MFL	2nd	33	18	10	5	55	27	28	64	R2	—	—	1QR
2024–25	1. MFL	1st	33	20	10	3	59	30	29	70	SF	—	—	1QR
2025–26	1. MFL	2nd	33	23	5	5	67	30	37	74	RU	3QR	PO	LP

== Shkëndija in Europe ==
Shkëndija made their European debut in the 2011–12 UEFA Champions League second qualifying round, losing 0–5 on aggregate to FK Partizan. After early exits in the UEFA Europa League (2012–13 v. Portadown; 2014–15 v. Zimbru), the club's first notable run came in 2015–16, when they drew both legs with Aberdeen (1–1 agg.) but went out on away goals in Q1.

Shkëndija twice reached the Europa League play-off round. In 2016–17 they advanced to the play-offs but lost 1–6 on aggregate to Gent. In 2017–18 they again reached the play-offs after three qualifying wins, falling 0–7 on aggregate to Milan.

Their deepest Champions League path came in 2018–19, defeating The New Saints and Sheriff before a 0–4 aggregate loss to Salzburg in Q3; they then moved to the Europa League play-off, where Rosenborg advanced 5–1 on aggregate.

In the 2020–21 UEFA Europa League third qualifying round, Shkëndija lost 1–3 to Tottenham Hotspur at the Toše Proeski Arena in Skopje on 24 September 2020; the goals came from Erik Lamela (5'), Valjmir Nafiu (55'), Son Heung-min (70') and Harry Kane (79'). Before kick-off the goalframes were measured and found to be 5 cm too low; at José Mourinho’s insistence they were replaced with regulation-size posts.

In the 2022–23 qualifiers, Shkëndija beat Ararat Yerevan and Valmiera to reach Q3, where they drew 2–2 on aggregate with AIK but were eliminated on penalties in Skopje.

In 2025–26 qualifying, Shkëndija beat The New Saints in Q1 and produced an upset against FCSB in Q2 (3–1 agg.) to reach Q3, where they were paired with Qarabağ. The result guaranteed the club their first league or group stage involvement in European competitions.

=== Summary ===
Competition	Pld	W	D	L	GF	GA	GD	Win%
UEFA Champions League	18	6	2	10	14	29	−15	33.33
UEFA Europa League	31	12	6	13	37	41	−4	38.71
UEFA Conference League	18	6	4	8	17	19	−2	33.33
Total	67	24	12	31	68	89	−21	35.82

=== Results ===
Season	Competition	Round	Club	Home	Away	Aggregate
2011–12	UEFA Champions League	2QR	(Serbia) Partizan	0–1	0–4	0–5
2012–13	UEFA Europa League	1QR	(Northern Ireland) Portadown	0–0	1–2	1–2
2014–15	UEFA Europa League	1QR	(Moldova) Zimbru	2–1	0–2	2–3
2015–16	UEFA Europa League	1QR	(Scotland) Aberdeen	1–1	0–0	1–1 (a)
2016–17	UEFA Europa League	1QR	(Poland) Cracovia	2–0	2–1	4–1
2016–17	UEFA Europa League	2QR	(Azerbaijan) Neftçi	1–0	0–0	1–0
2016–17	UEFA Europa League	3QR	(Czech Republic) Mladá Boleslav	2–0	0–1	2–1
2016–17	UEFA Europa League	PO	(Belgium) Gent	0–4	1–2	1–6
2017–18	UEFA Europa League	1QR	(Moldova) Dacia	3–0	4–0	7–0
2017–18	UEFA Europa League	2QR	(Finland) HJK	3–1	1–1	4–2
2017–18	UEFA Europa League	3QR	(Lithuania) Trakai	3–0	1–2	4–2
2017–18	UEFA Europa League	PO	(Italy) Milan	0–1	0–6	0–7
2018–19	UEFA Champions League	1QR	(Wales) The New Saints	5–0	0–4	5–4
2018–19	UEFA Champions League	2QR	(Moldova) Sheriff	1–0	0–0	1–0
2018–19	UEFA Champions League	3QR	(Austria) Red Bull Salzburg	0–1	0–3	0–4
2018–19	UEFA Europa League	PO	(Norway) Rosenborg	0–2	1–3	1–5
2019–20	UEFA Champions League	1QR	(Estonia) Nõmme Kalju	1–2	1–0	2–2 (a)
2019–20	UEFA Europa League	2QR	(Luxembourg) F91 Dudelange	1–2	1–1	2–3
2020–21	UEFA Europa League	1QR	(Azerbaijan) Sumgayit	—N/a	2–0	—N/a
2020–21	UEFA Europa League	2QR	(Romania) Botoșani	—N/a	1–0	—N/a
2020–21	UEFA Europa League	3QR	(England) Tottenham Hotspur	1–3	—N/a	—N/a
2021–22	UEFA Champions League	1QR	(Slovenia) Mura	0–1	0–5	0–6
2021–22	UEFA Conference League	2QR	(Latvia) Riga	0–1	0–2	0–3
2022–23	UEFA Conference League	1QR	(Armenia) Ararat Yerevan	2–0	2–2	4–2
2022–23	UEFA Conference League	2QR	(Latvia) Valmiera	3–1	2–1	5–2
2022–23	UEFA Conference League	3QR	(Sweden) AIK	1–1 (a.e.t.)	1–1	2–2 (2–3 p)
2023–24	UEFA Conference League	1QR	(Wales) Haverfordwest County	1–0	0–1 (a.e.t.)	1–1 (2–3 p)
2024–25	UEFA Conference League	1QR	(Armenia) Noah	1–2	0–2	1–4
2025–26	UEFA Champions League	1QR	(Wales) The New Saints	2–1 (a.e.t.)	0–0	2–1
2025–26	UEFA Champions League	2QR	(Romania) FCSB	1–0	2–1	3–1
2025–26	UEFA Champions League	3QR	(Azerbaijan) Qarabağ	0–1	1–5	1–6
2025–26	UEFA Europa League	PO	(Bulgaria) Ludogorets	2–1	1–4 (a.e.t.)	3–5
2025–26	UEFA Conference League	LP	(Spain) Rayo Vallecano	0–2		22nd out of 36
2025–26	UEFA Conference League	LP	(Republic of Ireland) Shelbourne	1–0		22nd out of 36
2025–26	UEFA Conference League	LP	(Poland) Jagiellonia Białystok	1–1		22nd out of 36
2025–26	UEFA Conference League	LP	(Kosovo) Drita	0–1		22nd out of 36
2025–26	UEFA Conference League	LP	(Slovakia) Slovan Bratislava	2–0		22nd out of 36
2025–26	UEFA Conference League	LP	(Cyprus) AEK Larnaca	0–1		22nd out of 36
2025–26	UEFA Conference League	KPO	(Turkey) Samsunspor	0–1	0–4	0–5
2026–27	UEFA Conference League	1QR	(Gibraltar) Europa FC	1–0	5–0	6–0
2026–27	UEFA Conference League	2QR	(Slovenia) Bravo	3–1	1–2	4–3
2026–27	UEFA Conference League	3QR	(Scotland) Hibernian	0–0	1–2	1–2

=== UEFA Ranking history ===
As of 15 May 2025

Rank	Team	Points
137	(Sweden) Elfsborg	11.000
138	(Turkey) Trabzonspor	11.000
139	(North Macedonia) Shkëndija	10.875
140	(Armenia) Noah	10.750
141	(Romania) Universitatea Craiova	10.500
