= Bojan Ušumović =

Serbian footballer

Personal information
- Full name: Bojan Ušumović
- Date of birth: 24 June 1988 (age 38)
- Place of birth: Subotica, SR Serbia, SFR Yugoslavia
- Height: 1.88 m (6 ft 2 in)
- Position: Defender

Youth career
- Red Star Belgrade

Senior career*
Years	Team	Apps	(Gls)
2005–2007	Red Star Belgrade	0	(0)
2005–2006	→ OFK Tavankut (loan)	12	(1)
2006–2007	→ Palić (loan)	9	(1)
2007–2009	Zlatibor Voda	11	(1)
2008–2009	→ Senta (loan)	24	(0)
2009–2010	Proleter Teslić		
2011	BSK Borča	6	(0)
2012	Radnički Sombor	12	(0)
2012	Jedinstvo Bijelo Polje	4	(0)
2013	Mladenovac	7	(0)
2013–2014	Bačka 1901	27	(2)
2015	Besëlidhja Lezhë	6	(1)
2015–2016	Bačka 1901		
2017	Potisje Knićanin		
2017–2020	Tisa Adorjan		
- * Club domestic league appearances and goals as of 1 July 2015

Bojan Ušumović (Serbian Cyrillic: Бојан Ушумовић; born 24 June 1988) is a Serbian football defender.

He has represented a number of clubs from Serbia, Bosnia and Herzegovina, Montenegro and Albania, and his career highlight were the 2 half-seasons he spent with BSK Borča covering from start till end of 2011 when the club played in the Serbian SuperLiga.

Later, during 2016 when he was under contract again with Bačka 1901, a club traditionally linked with the Croatian community in Vojvodina, he was part of the Croats of Serbia team at the 2016 EUROPEADA.
