= Alaidin Sallaku =

Albanian footballer

Personal information
- Date of birth: 4 February 1995 (age 31)
- Place of birth: Tirana, Albania
- Position: Forward

Team information
- Current team: Torpedo Kutaisi
- Number: 11

Youth career
- 2011–2012: Tirana
- 2012–2013: Apolonia Fier

Senior career*
Years	Team	Apps	(Gls)
2013–2014	Apolonia Fier	20	(1)
2014–2016	Besa Kavajë	45	(6)
2016–2019	Turbina Cërrik	57	(7)
2020	KF Bylis	6	(1)
2020–2021	Turbina Cërrik	5	(1)
2021–	Torpedo Kutaisi	0	(0)

International career
- Albania U-19
- * Club domestic league appearances and goals as of 18 October 2019

Alaidin Sallaku (born 4 February 1995) is an Albanian football player. He plays as a forward for Torpedo Kutaisi in Erovnuli Liga.

In February 2021, Sallaku signed with Torpedo Kutaisi and was presented as a new player of the club.
