= Bekim Iliazi =

Albanian footballer (born 1993)

Personal information
- Full name: Bekim Iliazi
- Date of birth: 31 December 1993 (age 32)
- Place of birth: Fushë-Krujë, Albania
- Height: 1.84 m (6 ft 0 in)
- Positions: Attacking midfielder; forward

Youth career
- Tottenham
- 2013: Partizani Tirana

Senior career*
| Years | Team | Apps | (Gls) |
| 2013 | Partizani | 2 | (0) |
| 2014 | Kukësi | 0 | (0) |
| 2014 | → Sopoti (loan) | 8 | (0) |
- * Club domestic league appearances and goals

Bekim Iliazi (born 31 December 1993) is an Albanian footballer who most recently played for FK Kukësi in the Albanian Superliga.

He played for Sopoti Librazhd in the first half of 2014–15 season.
