= Ballistët =

Football club supporters' group

- Ballistët Tetovë
- Abbreviation: B92
- Founded: 1992
- Type: Supporters' group, Ultras group
- Team: Shkëndija
- Motto: Me ty Shkëndijë, edhe në botën tjetër
- Headquarters: Tetovo, North Macedonia
- Arenas: Ecolog Arena
- Stand: North
- Coordinates: 42°00′N 20°58′E
- Colors: Red and Black

Ballists (Albanian: Ballistët) are ultra supporters of the KF Shkëndija football club in Tetovo, North Macedonia. They were officially established as the main ultras group for Shkëndija in 1992.

== History ==
The supporters of Shkëndija are called the Ballistët, named after the World War II fascist paramilitary group, Balli Kombëtar.

== 2010s ==
The Shkëndija supporters booed the Macedonian national anthem, threw flares at the police and security as well as chanting "Ballisti Zakon", "UÇK" and other nationalistic rhetoric. Also and Macedonian fans of Teteks did the same against Albanians.

After Shkëndija's 5–0 victory over Teteks, Shkëlzen Meta, the leading captain of the Ballistët, handed over the reins to the young Isak Luma.

On 19 October 2014, during the rivalry match against FK Vardar, The Ballistët held a large banner stating "They are cancer of Europe – UEFA do you need more?!" accompanied with a montage of pictures showing Serb hooligans involved in the Serbia vs England U-21 match, Italy vs Serbia match and the Serbia vs Albania match.

On 7 April 2015, Shkëndija were fined by the FFM and supporters banned due to politically motivated banners and chants, as well as the assault on FK Tetek's manager Gorazd Mihajlov.

On the morning of the 21 February 2016, two buses of Buducnost Podgorica supporters, Varvari Podgorica, travelled to Skopje to attend a match. On the road to Skopje, Shkendija supporters, Ballistët, came across the supporters while heading towards the match between Shkendija and Turnovo on the bridge.
