= 2008–09 FK Partizani Tirana season =

Partizani Tirana
2008–09 season
- President: Albert Xhani
- Head coach: Hasan Lika (until 26 October 2008); Shpëtim Duro (from 26 October 2008)
- Stadium: Qemal Stafa Stadium
- Kategoria Superiore: 10th
- Albanian Cup: Quarter-finals
- UEFA Cup: First qualifying round
- Top goalscorer: League: Marius Ngjela (10); All: Marius Ngjela (12)
Home colours	Away colours

In the 2008–09 season, Partizani Tirana was again relegated from the Kategoria Superiore after eight seasons playing in that competition, after a loss in the relegation play-out against Kastrioti Krujë, in a game that was marred by poor refereeing decisions as well as violence.

== First-team squad ==
Squad at end of season

Note: Flags indicate national team as defined under FIFA eligibility rules; some limited exceptions apply. Players may hold more than one non-FIFA nationality.

No.	Pos.	Nation	Player
—	GK	ALB	Orges Shehi
—	GK	ALB	Dashamir Xhika
—	DF	ALB	Rigers Cekaj
—	DF	ALB	Viktor Gjyla
—	DF	ALB	Etien Hametaj
—	DF	ALB	Renato Malota
—	DF	ALB	Eradi Mertiri
—	DF	ALB	Luan Pinari
—	DF	ALB	Andrelis Pashaj
—	DF	ALB	Fatjon Tafaj
—	MF	ALB	Dritan Babamusta
—	MF	USA	Besmir Bega (on loan from Tirana)

No.	Pos.	Nation	Player
—	MF	ALB	Engert Bakalli
—	MF	ALB	Arbër Capa
—	MF	ALB	Armando Doda
—	MF	ALB	Erando Karabeci
—	MF	ALB	Artan Karapici
—	MF	ALB	Rezart Maho
—	FW	ALB	Alban Dashi
—	FW	ALB	Genti Gjondedaj
—	FW	ALB	Renis Mehja
—	FW	ALB	Marius Ngjela
—	FW	ALB	Salvador Sulçe

== Transfers ==
=== Summer ===
In: Note: Flags indicate national team as defined under FIFA eligibility rules; some limited exceptions apply. Players may hold more than one non-FIFA nationality.

No.	Pos.	Nation	Player
—	GK	ALB	Edvan Bakaj (loan return from Luftëtari Gjirokastër)
—	DF	ALB	Rigers Cekaj (from Lushnja)
—	DF	ALB	Renaldo Kalari (from Kastrioti Krujë)
—	DF	ALB	Renato Malota (from Besëlidhja Lezhë)
—	DF	ALB	Andrelis Pashaj (from Skënderbeu Korçë)
—	DF	ALB	Raimond Shala (from Apolonia Fier)
—	MF	BRA	Felipe Macedo Castelani (from (Austria) Wacker Innsbruck)
—	MF	ALB	Teodor Perlleshi (from Skënderbeu Korçë)
—	FW	BRA	Bruno Barbosa (from (Brazil) Flamengo)
—	FW	ALB	Renis Mehja (from Besëlidhja Lezhë)
—	FW	ALB	Marius Ngjela (from Besëlidhja Lezhë)
—	FW	BRA	Roma (from (Brazil) Santa Cruz)

Out: Note: Flags indicate national team as defined under FIFA eligibility rules; some limited exceptions apply. Players may hold more than one non-FIFA nationality.

No.	Pos.	Nation	Player
—	GK	ALB	Edvan Bakaj (on loan to Laçi)
—	DF	ALB	Tefik Osmani (to Tirana)
—	MF	ALB	Bledar Devolli (to Tirana)
—	MF	ALB	Bledi Shkëmbi (to Skënderbeu Korçë)
—	MF	ALB	Ardit Beqiri (to Elbasani)
—	MF	ALB	Paulin Dhëmbi (to Vllaznia Shkodër)
—	MF	ALB	Gjergji Muzaka (to Tirana)
—	FW	ALB	Arbër Abilaliaj (to Besa Kavajë)

=== Winter ===
In: Note: Flags indicate national team as defined under FIFA eligibility rules; some limited exceptions apply. Players may hold more than one non-FIFA nationality.

No.	Pos.	Nation	Player
—	DF	ALB	Eradi Mertiri (from Dinamo Tirana)
—	MF	ALB	Engert Bakalli (from Elbasani)
—	MF	ALB	Rezart Maho (from (Greece) Kalamata)
—	FW	USA	Besmir Bega (on loan from Tirana)
—	FW	ALB	Genti Gjondedaj (from Teuta Durrës)

Out: Note: Flags indicate national team as defined under FIFA eligibility rules; some limited exceptions apply. Players may hold more than one non-FIFA nationality.

No.	Pos.	Nation	Player
—	DF	ALB	Rrahman Hallaçi (to Elbasani)
—	DF	ALB	Renaldo Kalari (to Kastrioti Krujë)
—	DF	ALB	Raimond Shala (to Kastrioti Krujë)
—	MF	BRA	Felipe Macedo Castelani (released)
—	MF	ALB	Teodor Perlleshi (to Kamza)
—	FW	BRA	Bruno Barbosa (released)
—	FW	ALB	Elis Bakaj (to Dinamo Tirana)
—	FW	BRA	Roma (to (Brazil) Macaé)

== Competitions ==
=== Kategoria Superiore ===
==== League table ====
Pos	Team	Pld	W	D	L	GF	GA	GD	Pts	Qualification or relegation
8	Apolonia	33	11	5	17	36	43	−7	38	
9	Bylis (R)	33	9	10	14	28	38	−10	37	Qualification for the relegation play-offs
10	Partizani (R)	33	9	9	15	27	36	−9	36	Qualification for the relegation play-offs
11	Lushnja (R)	33	8	12	13	25	35	−10	36	Relegation to the 2009–10 Kategoria e Parë
12	Elbasani (R)	33	7	14	12	28	39	−11	35	Relegation to the 2009–10 Kategoria e Parë

Source: Albanian Football Association (in Albanian), Soccerway
Rules for classification: 1) points; 2) points in head-to-head matches; 3) goal difference in head-to-head matches; 4) goals scored in head-to-head matches; 5) total goal difference; 6) total goals scored; 7) draw
(R) Relegated

==== Results summary ====
Overall								Home						Away					
Pld	W	D	L	GF	GA	GD	Pts	W	D	L	GF	GA	GD	W	D	L	GF	GA	GD
33	9	9	15	27	36	−9	36	5	7	4	17	16	+1	4	2	11	10	20	−10

Source: Competitive matches

==== Results by round ====
Round	1	2	3	4	5	6	7	8	9	10	11	12	13	14	15	16	17	18	19	20	21	22	23	24	25	26	27	28	29	30	31	32	33
Ground	A	H	A	A	H	A	H	A	H	A	H	H	A	H	H	A	H	A	H	A	H	A	A	H	A	H	A	H	A	H	A	H	A
Result	W	L	L	D	L	L	D	L	L	D	D	D	L	D	D	L	W	W	W	L	W	W	L	D	W	L	L	D	L	W	L	W	L
Position	2	8	8	7	9	11	11	12	12	12	11	11	12	12	12	12	11	11	10	10	10	9	9	9	8	8	8	8	8	8	8	8	10

Source: Competitive matches
A = Away; H = Home; W = Win; D = Draw; L = Loss

==== Matches ====
24 August 2008 1	Lushnja	0–1	Partizani Tirana	Lushnjë
17:00 CEST			Karapici 64'	Stadium: Abdurrahman Roza Haxhiu Stadium; Attendance: 5,000; Referee: Lorenc Jemini

31 August 2008 2	Partizani Tirana	1–2	Vllaznia Shkodër	Tirana
17:00 CEST	Karapici 64'		Sinani 21'; Dhëmbi 64'	Stadium: Qemal Stafa Stadium; Attendance: 300; Referee: Bardhyl Pashaj

14 September 2008 3	Tirana	2–1	Partizani Tirana	Tirana
16:30 CEST	Xhafaj 20'; Lila 90'		Kalari (yellow card) 0' (yellow-red card) 48'; Bruno 58'	Stadium: Selman Stërmasi Stadium; Referee: Elvis Peza

21 September 2008 4	Teuta Durrës	0–0	Partizani Tirana	Shijak (Note: The match was held at Tofik Jashari Stadium due to reconstruction of Niko Dovana Stadium.)
16:00 CEST				Stadium: Tofik Jashari Stadium; Referee: Aranit Lulaj

28 September 2008 5	Partizani Tirana	0–1	Apolonia Fier	Tirana
16:00 CEST			Asllani 35'	Stadium: Qemal Stafa Stadium; Referee: Albano Janku

4 October 2008 6	Flamurtari Vlorë	1–0	Partizani Tirana	Vlorë
16:00 CEST	Brajković 31' (pen.)		Tafaj (yellow card) 0' (yellow-red card) 89'; Pinari (yellow card) 0' (yellow-red card) 90+3'	Stadium: Flamurtari Stadium; Referee: Lorenc Jemini

19 October 2008 7	Partizani Tirana	1–1	Bylis Ballsh	Tirana
18:30 CEST	Karapici 13'; Gjyla (yellow card) 0' (yellow-red card) 90+2'		Nenaj 55' (pen.)	Stadium: Qemal Stafa Stadium; Referee: Shkelqim Guce

25 October 2008 8	Dinamo Tirana	2–0	Partizani Tirana	Tirana
14:30 CEST	Poçi 38'; Plaku 73'			Stadium: Selman Stërmasi Stadium; Referee: Albano Janku

1 November 2008 9	Partizani Tirana	0–2	Shkumbini Peqin	Tirana
14:30 CET			Rizvanolli 32'; Nora 53'	Stadium: Qemal Stafa Stadium; Referee: Tanush Latifi

7 November 2008 10	Besa Kavajë	0–0	Partizani Tirana	Kavajë
14:00 CET				Stadium: Besa Stadium; Referee: Sokol Cekaj

15 November 2008 11	Partizani Tirana	2–2	Elbasani	Tirana
14:00 CET	Ngjela 43', 86'		Abazaj 26'; Ahmataj 89'	Stadium: Qemal Stafa Stadium; Referee: Albano Janku

23 November 2008 12	Partizani Tirana	0–0	Lushnja	Tirana
14:00 CET				Stadium: Qemal Stafa Stadium; Attendance: 200; Referee: Kridens Meta

29 November 2008 13	Vllaznia Shkodër	2–1	Partizani Tirana	Shkodër
14:00 CET	Boadu 26'; Shtubina 85'		Bakaj 35'	Stadium: Loro Boriçi Stadium; Referee: Artan Taullai

7 December 2008 14	Partizani Tirana	2–2	Tirana	Tirana
14:00 CET	Karabeci 64'; Ngjela 68'		Sefa 2'; Osmani (yellow card) 0' (yellow-red card) 68'; Memelli 82'	Stadium: Qemal Stafa Stadium; Attendance: 2,000; Referee: Sokol Jareci

13 December 2008 15	Partizani Tirana	0–0	Teuta Durrës	Tirana
16:00 CET				Stadium: Qemal Stafa Stadium; Referee: Edvin Hoxha

20 December 2008 16	Apolonia Fier	3–1	Partizani Tirana	Fier
14:00 CET	Brkić 19'; Asllani 60'; Dhrami 90'		Malota 2'; Shehi (red card) 69'	Stadium: Loni Papuçiu Stadium; Referee: Albano Janku

27 December 2008 17	Partizani Tirana	2–0	Flamurtari Vlorë	Tirana
13:30 CET	Babamusta 2'; Bakaj 66'			Stadium: Qemal Stafa Stadium; Referee: Remzi Sadiku

31 January 2009 18	Bylis Ballsh	0–1	Partizani Tirana	Ballsh
16:00 CET			Ngjela 20'	Stadium: Adush Muça Stadium; Referee: Kridens Meta

4 February 2009 19	Partizani Tirana	1–0	Dinamo Tirana	Tirana
14:00 CET	Babamusta 85'			Stadium: Qemal Stafa Stadium; Referee: Artan Taullai

15 February 2009 20	Shkumbini Peqin	1–0	Partizani Tirana	Peqin
14:30 CET	Dervishi 42'			Stadium: Shkumbini Stadium; Referee: Tanush Latifi

21 February 2009 21	Partizani Tirana	1–0	Besa Kavajë	Tirana
14:30 CET	Ngjela 45'; Malota (yellow card) 0' (yellow-red card) 63'		Kuli (yellow card) 0' (yellow-red card) 90+1'	Stadium: Qemal Stafa Stadium; Referee: Mentor Sopjani

1 March 2009 22	Elbasani	0–1	Partizani Tirana	Elbasan
16:00 CET			Bega 30'; Capa (yellow card) 0' (yellow-red card) 90+2'	Stadium: Rudi Bizhuta Stadium; Referee: Bardhyl Pashaj

7 March 2009 23	Teuta Durrës	3–2	Partizani Tirana	Durrës
16:00 CET	Vila 49', 84'; Tafaj 90+2' (o.g.)		Ngjela 36'; Karapici 61'	Stadium: Niko Dovana Stadium; Referee: Pajtim Lapi

15 March 2009 24	Partizani Tirana	0–0	Besa Kavajë	Tirana
15:00 CET				Stadium: Qemal Stafa Stadium; Referee: Tanush Latifi

21 March 2009 25	Shkumbini Peqin	0–1	Partizani Tirana	Peqin
16:00 CET			Maho 90+4'	Stadium: Shkumbini Stadium; Referee: Aranit Lulaj

5 April 2009 26	Partizani Tirana	1–2	Dinamo Tirana	Tirana
16:00 CEST	Malota (red card) 70'; Babamusta 75'		Bodrušić 68' (pen.); Poçi 76'; Bakaj (yellow card) 0' (yellow-red card) 89'	Stadium: Qemal Stafa Stadium; Referee: Edvin Hoxha

11 April 2009 27	Vllaznia Shkodër	2–0	Partizani Tirana	Shkodër
16:30 CEST	Shtubina 26'; Liçi 64' (pen.)			Stadium: Loro Boriçi Stadium; Referee: Sokol Jareci

18 April 2009 28	Partizani Tirana	2–2	Tirana	Tirana
16:30 CEST	Babamusta 63'; Ngjela 67'		Xhafaj 56', 87'	Stadium: Qemal Stafa Stadium; Referee: Lorenc Jemini

25 April 2009 29	Bylis Ballsh	1–0	Partizani Tirana	Ballsh
16:30 CEST	Nenaj 12' (pen.)			Stadium: Adush Muça Stadium; Referee: Kridens Meta

2 May 2009 30	Partizani Tirana	2–1	Apolonia Fier	Tirana
17:00 CEST	Karapici 29' (pen.); Bega 84'		Brkić 52'	Stadium: Qemal Stafa Stadium; Referee: Sokol Jareci

9 May 2009 31	Flamurtari Vlorë	2–1	Partizani Tirana	Vlorë
16:30 CEST	Strati 25'; Panić 69'		Ngjela 55'	Stadium: Flamurtari Stadium; Referee: Elvis Peza

16 May 2009 32	Partizani Tirana	2–1	Elbasani	Tirana
17:00 CEST	Ngjela 10', 89'		Hyshmeri 76' (pen.); Fagu (red card) 90'	Stadium: Qemal Stafa Stadium

23 May 2009 33	Lushnja	1–0	Partizani Tirana	Lushnjë
17:00 CEST	Sekseri 43'			Stadium: Abdurrahman Roza Haxhiu Stadium; Attendance: 10,300; Referee: Aleksandar Stavrev (Macedonia)

==== Relegation play-offs ====
29 May 2009	Partizani Tirana	0–1	Kastrioti Krujë	Durrës
17:00 CEST			Prela 42'	Stadium: Niko Dovana Stadium; Referee: Arjan Mali

=== Albanian Cup ===
==== First round ====
29 October 2008 First round (Note: There was a one legged match because the second leg was not played due to the Tepelena withdrawal.)	Tepelena	1–5	Partizani Tirana	Tepelenë
	Xhafa 79' (pen.)		Babamusta 11'; Roma 13', 42'; Capa 56'; Ngjela 71'	Stadium: Sabahudin Shehu Stadium

==== Second round ====
3 December 2008 First leg	Burreli	0–1	Partizani Tirana	Burrel
14:00 CET			Capa 49'	Stadium: Liri Ballabani Stadium

17 December 2008 Second leg	Partizani Tirana	5–0 (6–0 agg.)	Burreli	Kamëz
13:30 CET	Bakaj 15' (red card) 26'; Perlleshi 42'; Ngjela 44'; Capa 49'; Karabeci 87'		Meta (red card) 16'; Celaj (red card) 26'	Stadium: National Sports Centre; Referee: Aranit Lulaj

==== Quarter-finals ====
25 February 2009 First leg	Flamurtari Vlorë	1–0	Partizani Tirana	Vlorë
14:30 CET	Shehaj 41' (pen.)		Tafaj (red card) 40'	Stadium: Flamurtari Stadium

11 March 2009 Second leg	Partizani Tirana	1–0 (a.e.t.) (1–1 agg.) (5−4 p)	Flamurtari Vlorë	Tirana
14:30 CET	Capa 40'		Beqiri (yellow card) 0' (yellow-red card) 90'	Stadium: Qemal Stafa Stadium; Referee: Bardhyl Pashaj

- The tie was annulled due to both teams fielding players that previously played in the Cup for other teams. Flamurtari's Eriol Merxha played for Elbasani while Partizani's Genti Gjondedaj and Engert Bakalli played for Teuta and Elbasani, respectively. The tie was replayed with one-legged match, played on Niko Dovana Stadium in Durrës on 8 April 2009.

8 April 2009 Replay	Partizani Tirana	0–1 (a.e.t.)	Flamurtari Vlorë	Durrës
16:00 CET		Report	Mema 108' (pen.)	Stadium: Niko Dovana Stadium; Referee: Sokol Cekaj

=== UEFA Cup ===
==== First qualifying round ====
17 July 2008 First leg	Široki Brijeg (Bosnia and Herzegovina)	0–0	(Albania) Partizani Tirana	Široki Brijeg, Bosnia and Herzegovina
20:15 CEST		Report		Stadium: Stadion Pecara; Referee: Pavel Olšiak (Slovakia)

31 July 2008 Second leg	Partizani Tirana (Albania)	1–3 (1–3 agg.)	(Bosnia and Herzegovina) Široki Brijeg	Tirana, Albania
20:00 CEST	Muzaka 39' (pen.)	Report	Ala do Carmo 10', 44'; Šilić 84'	Stadium: Qemal Stafa Stadium; Referee: Bas Nijhuis (Netherlands)
