= 2007–08 FK Partizani Tirana season =

Partizani Tirana
2007–08 season
- President: Albert Xhani
- Head coach: Hasan Lika
- Stadium: Qemal Stafa Stadium
- Kategoria Superiore: 2nd
- Albanian Cup: Quarter-finals
- Top goalscorer: League: Elis Bakaj (12); All: Elis Bakaj (16)
Home colours	Away colours

In the 2007–08 season, Partizani Tirana competed in the Kategoria Superiore for the seventh consecutive season. The club finished in second place, after a dramatic loss in a deciding match against Dinamo Tirana in the last round. Their second place was a best result since 1993.

== First-team squad ==
Note: Flags indicate national team as defined under FIFA eligibility rules; some limited exceptions apply. Players may hold more than one non-FIFA nationality.

No.	Pos.	Nation	Player
1	GK	ALB	Orges Shehi
3	DF	ALB	Tefik Osmani
4	DF	ALB	Ardit Beqiri
5	DF	ALB	Fatjon Tafaj
7	FW	ALB	Arbër Abilaliaj
10	MF	ALB	Bledi Shkëmbi
11	MF	ALB	Viktor Gjyla
12	GK	ALB	Dashamir Xhika
13	DF	ALB	Rrahman Hallaçi
17	MF	ALB	Gjergji Muzaka
19	FW	ALB	Elis Bakaj
20	MF	ALB	Paulin Dhëmbi

No.	Pos.	Nation	Player
22	MF	ALB	Dritan Babamusta
—	GK	ALB	Gerald Hasmetaj
—	DF	ALB	Luan Pinari
—	MF	ALB	Armando Doda
—	MF	ALB	Matios Metaj
—	MF	ALB	Bledar Devolli
—	MF	ALB	Erando Karabeçi
—	MF	ALB	Artan Karapiçi
—	MF	ALB	Elton Doku
—	FW	ALB	Enco Malindi
—	FW	ALB	Arbër Capa
—	FW	ALB	Alban Dashi

== Competitions ==
=== Kategoria Superiore ===
==== League table ====
Pos	Team	Pld	W	D	L	GF	GA	GD	Pts	Qualification or relegation
1	Dinamo Tirana (C)	33	21	7	5	56	14	+42	70	Qualification for the Champions League first qualifying round
2	Partizani	33	18	11	4	47	22	+25	65	Qualification for the UEFA Cup first qualifying round
3	Besa	33	17	5	11	45	36	+9	56	Qualification for the Intertoto Cup first round
4	Elbasani	33	13	13	7	40	24	+16	52	
5	Shkumbini	33	14	8	11	35	28	+7	50	

Source: Albanian Football Association (in Albanian), Soccerway
Rules for classification: 1) points; 2) points in head-to-head matches; 3) goal difference in head-to-head matches; 4) goals scored in head-to-head matches; 5) total goal difference; 6) total goals scored; 7) draw
(C) Champions

==== Results summary ====
Overall								Home						Away					
Pld	W	D	L	GF	GA	GD	Pts	W	D	L	GF	GA	GD	W	D	L	GF	GA	GD
33	18	11	4	47	22	+25	65	12	5	0	30	6	+24	6	6	4	17	16	+1

Source: Competitive matches

==== Results by round ====
Round	1	2	3	4	5	6	7	8	9	10	11	12	13	14	15	16	17	18	19	20	21	22	23	24	25	26	27	28	29	30	31	32	33
Ground	H	A	H	A	H	A	H	A	H	A	H	A	H	A	H	A	H	A	H	A	H	A	H	A	H	A	H	A	H	A	H	H	A
Result	W	W	W	W	W	D	W	L	D	L	D	D	W	D	W	D	D	W	D	D	W	W	W	W	D	L	W	D	W	W	W	W	L
Position	4	4	3	2	1	2	1	2	1	3	3	3	1	2	2	2	2	2	2	2	2	2	2	2	2	2	2	2	2	2	2	2	2

Source: Competitive matches
A = Away; H = Home; W = Win; D = Draw; L = Loss

==== Matches ====
26 August 2007 1	Partizani Tirana	2–1	Shkumbini Peqin	Tirana
17:00 CEST	Abilaliaj 8'; Muzaka 24'	Report	Dalipi 44'	Stadium: Qemal Stafa Stadium

1 September 2007 2	Besëlidhja Lezhë	1–2	Partizani Tirana	Lezhë
16:30 CEST	Roshi 23'	Report	Alçani 26' (o.g.); Gjyla 67'	Stadium: Brian Filipi Stadium

15 September 2007 3	Partizani Tirana	1–0	Vllaznia Shkodër	Tirana
17:30 CEST	Bakaj 28'	Report		Stadium: Qemal Stafa Stadium

23 September 2007 4	Kastrioti Krujë	0–1	Partizani Tirana	Krujë
16:00 CEST		Report	Muzaka 41'	Stadium: Kastrioti Stadium

29 September 2007 5	Partizani Tirana	4–0	Teuta Durrës	Tirana
19:00 CEST	Muzaka 37' (pen.); Shkëmbi 77'; Bakaj 85'; Osmani 89'	Report		Stadium: Qemal Stafa Stadium

6 October 2007 6	Flamurtari Vlorë	0–0	Partizani Tirana	Vlorë
16:00 CEST		Report		Stadium: Flamurtari Stadium

21 October 2007 7	Partizani Tirana	4–0	Skënderbeu Korçë	Tirana
14:30 CEST	Muzaka 4'; Abilaliaj 40'; Gjyla 45'; Bakaj 60'	Report		Stadium: Qemal Stafa Stadium

31 October 2007 8	Besa Kavajë	2–1	Partizani Tirana	Kavajë
14:30 CET	Alikaj 59'; Xhihani 65'	Report	Gjyla 49'	Stadium: Besa Stadium

3 November 2007 9	Partizani Tirana	0–0	Elbasani	Tirana
18:00 CET		Report		Stadium: Qemal Stafa Stadium

7 November 2007 10	Dinamo Tirana	2–0	Partizani Tirana	Tirana
14:00 CET	Plaku 51'; Pejić 63'	Report		Stadium: Selman Stërmasi Stadium

10 November 2007 11	Partizani Tirana	0–0	Tirana	Tirana
18:00 CET		Report		Stadium: Qemal Stafa Stadium

25 November 2007 12	Shkumbini Peqin	1–1	Partizani Tirana	Peqin
14:00 CET	Qorri 77' (pen.)	Report	Bakaj 58'	Stadium: Shkumbini Stadium

1 December 2007 13	Partizani Tirana	4–0	Besëlidhja Lezhë	Tirana
14:00 CET	Muzaka 27', 41'; Dhëmbi 60'; Abilaliaj 90'	Report		Stadium: Qemal Stafa Stadium

8 December 2007 14	Vllaznia Shkodër	1–1	Partizani Tirana	Shkodër
15:30 CET	Osja 20'	Report	Bakaj 36'	Stadium: Loro Boriçi Stadium

14 December 2007 15	Partizani Tirana	2–1	Kastrioti Krujë	Tirana
14:10 CET	Bakaj 32'; Muzaka 90' (pen.)	Report	Rizvanolli 60'	Stadium: Qemal Stafa Stadium

23 December 2007 16	Teuta Durrës	1–1	Partizani Tirana	Durrës
14:00 CET	Dushku 30'	Report	Beqiri 77'	Stadium: Niko Dovana Stadium

29 December 2007 17	Partizani Tirana	0–0	Flamurtari Vlorë	Tirana
14:00 CET		Report		Stadium: Qemal Stafa Stadium

2 February 2008 18	Skënderbeu Korçë	1–2	Partizani Tirana	Korçë
14:00 CET	Shtubina 16'	Report	Shkëmbi 26'; Bakaj 55'	Stadium: Skënderbeu Stadium

9 February 2008 19	Partizani Tirana	3–3	Besa Kavajë	Tirana
14:30 CET	Shkëmbi 42'; Dhëmbi 47'; Bakaj 68'	Report	Xhihani 69', 90'; Leçi 77'	Stadium: Qemal Stafa Stadium

16 February 2008 20	Elbasani	0–0	Partizani Tirana	Elbasan
14:30 CET		Report		Stadium: Rudi Bizhuta Stadium

23 February 2008 21	Partizani Tirana	1–0	Dinamo Tirana	Tirana
14:30 CET	Muzaka 22'	Report		Stadium: Qemal Stafa Stadium

1 March 2008 22	Tirana	1–4	Partizani Tirana	Tirana
18:00 CET	Fortuzi 60'	Report	Osmani 4'; Devolli 23'; Shkëmbi 48'; Abilaliaj 72'	Stadium: Qemal Stafa Stadium

8 March 2008 23	Partizani Tirana	1–0	Besëlidhja Lezhë	Tirana
15:00 CET	Muzaka 1'	Report		Stadium: Qemal Stafa Stadium

23 March 2008 24	Teuta Durrës	1–2	Partizani Tirana	Durrës
15:30 CET	Mile 40'	Report	Abilaliaj 53', 63'	Stadium: Niko Dovana Stadium

29 March 2008 25	Partizani Tirana	0–0	Kastrioti Krujë	Tirana
15:30 CET		Report		Stadium: Qemal Stafa Stadium

5 April 2008 26	Flamurtari Vlorë	3–0	Partizani Tirana	Vlorë
16:30 CEST	Cani 58'; Mema 83'; Guga 89'	Report		Stadium: Flamurtari Stadium

12 April 2008 27	Partizani Tirana	2–0	Shkumbini Peqin	Tirana
16:30 CEST	Dhëmbi 44'; Bakaj 90'	Report		Stadium: Qemal Stafa Stadium

19 April 2008 28	Elbasani	0–0	Partizani Tirana	Elbasan
16:30 CEST		Report		Stadium: Rudi Bizhuta Stadium

26 April 2008 29	Partizani Tirana	2–1	Tirana	Tirana
16:30 CEST	Dhëmbi 19'; Bakaj 61'	Report	Xhafa 51'	Stadium: Qemal Stafa Stadium

3 May 2008 30	Besa Kavajë	0–1	Partizani Tirana	Kavajë
16:30 CEST		Report	Hallaçi 19'	Stadium: Besa Stadium

10 May 2008 31	Partizani Tirana	2–0	Vllaznia Shkodër	Tirana
16:30 CEST	Dhëmbi 43'; Bakaj 69'	Report		Stadium: Qemal Stafa Stadium

14 May 2008 32	Partizani Tirana	2–0	Skënderbeu Korçë	Tirana
16:30 CEST	Muzaka 4'; Bakaj 60'	Report		Stadium: Qemal Stafa Stadium

17 May 2008 33	Dinamo Tirana	2–1	Partizani Tirana	Tirana
16:30 CET	Kuli 4' (pen.); Ferraj 90+3'	Report	Osmani 33'	Stadium: Selman Stërmasi Stadium; Referee: Paolo Tagliavento (Italy)

=== Albanian Cup ===
==== First round ====
28 November 2007 First leg	Skrapari	0–2	Partizani Tirana	Skrapar
		Report	Bakaj 28'; Malindi 83'	Stadium: Skrapar Sports Field

4 December 2007 Second leg	Partizani Tirana	2–1 (4–1 agg.)	Skrapari	Kamëz
	Bakaj 20'; Karapici 31'	Report	Bytyçi 86' (pen.)	Stadium: National Sports Centre

==== Second round ====
13 February 2008 First leg	Skënderbeu Korçë	1–0	Partizani Tirana	Korçë
14:30 CET	Çipi 9'	Report		Stadium: Skënderbeu Stadium

27 February 2008 Second leg	Partizani Tirana	5–0 (5–1 agg.)	Skënderbeu Korçë	Tirana
14:00 CET	Abilaliaj 5'; Osmani 28'; Bakaj 43', 57'; Malindi 89'	Report		Stadium: Qemal Stafa Stadium

==== Quarter-finals ====
5 March 2008 First leg	Dinamo Tirana	3–1	Partizani Tirana	Tirana
15:00 CET	Allmuça 5'; Pejić 45'; Ishka 72'	Report	Devolli 89'	Stadium: Selman Stërmasi Stadium

12 March 2008 Second leg	Partizani Tirana	0–0 (1–3 agg.)	Dinamo Tirana	Tirana
17:00 CET		Report		Stadium: Qemal Stafa Stadium
