= 2006–07 FK Partizani Tirana season =

Partizani Tirana
2006–07 season
- President: Albert Xhani
- Head coach: Neptun Bajko (until 2 November 2006); Hasan Lika (from 2 November 2006)
- Stadium: Qemal Stafa Stadium
- Kategoria Superiore: 4th
- Albanian Cup: Semi-finals
- Intertoto Cup: First round
- Top goalscorer: League: Arbër Abilaliaj (10); All: Arbër Abilaliaj (10)
Home colours	Away colours

In the 2006–07 season, Partizani Tirana competed in the Kategoria Superiore for the sixth consecutive season and finished in fourth place. The club also reached the semi-finals of the Albanian Cup where it was eliminated by Teuta Durrës on the away goals rule.

== Competitions ==
=== Kategoria Superiore ===
==== League table ====
Pos	Team	Pld	W	D	L	GF	GA	GD	Pts	Qualification or relegation
2	Teuta	33	19	10	4	44	26	+18	67	Qualification for the UEFA Cup first qualifying round
3	Vllaznia	33	18	9	6	46	28	+18	63	Qualification for the Intertoto Cup first round
4	Partizani	33	17	6	10	44	25	+19	57	
5	Dinamo Tirana	33	14	5	14	41	39	+2	47	
6	Besa	33	11	8	14	35	38	−3	41	Qualification for the UEFA Cup first qualifying round (Note: Besa qualified for the UEFA Cup first qualifying round by winning the 2006–07 Albanian Cup.)

Source: Albanian Football Association (in Albanian), Soccerway
Rules for classification: 1) points; 2) points in head-to-head matches; 3) goal difference in head-to-head matches; 4) goals scored in head-to-head matches; 5) total goal difference; 6) total goals scored; 7) draw

==== Results summary ====
Overall								Home						Away					
Pld	W	D	L	GF	GA	GD	Pts	W	D	L	GF	GA	GD	W	D	L	GF	GA	GD
33	17	6	10	44	25	+19	57	11	2	4	27	13	+14	6	4	6	17	12	+5

Source: Competitive matches

==== Results by round ====
Round	1	2	3	4	5	6	7	8	9	10	11	12	13	14	15	16	17	18	19	20	21	22	23	24	25	26	27	28	29	30	31	32	33
Ground	H	A	H	A	H	A	H	A	H	A	H	A	H	A	H	A	H	A	H	A	H	A	H	A	H	A	H	H	A	H	A	H	A
Result	W	D	W	W	L	W	L	D	D	D	L	W	W	D	D	L	W	W	W	L	W	L	W	W	W	W	W	W	L	L	L	W	L
Position	2	4	2	2	3	2	2	4	4	4	4	4	3	3	4	5	4	3	2	4	4	4	4	4	4	3	3	3	4	4	4	4	4

Source: Competitive matches
A = Away; H = Home; W = Win; D = Draw; L = Loss

==== Matches ====
27 August 2006 1	Partizani Tirana	3–2	Apolonia Fier	Tirana
	Muzaka 1'; Babamusta 34'; Alan Cardec 74'	Report	Plaku 73' (pen.); Sulejmani 81'	Stadium: Qemal Stafa Stadium

10 September 2006 2	Teuta Durrës	0–0	Partizani Tirana	Durrës
		Report		Stadium: Niko Dovana Stadium

16 September 2006 3	Partizani Tirana	3–1	Luftëtari Gjirokastër	Tirana
	Abilaliaj 42'; Progni 42'; Bulku 88'	Report	Stafa 9'	Stadium: Qemal Stafa Stadium

24 September 2006 4	Besa Kavajë	0–2	Partizani Tirana	Durrës (Note: The match was held at Niko Dovana Stadium due to reconstruction of Besa Stadium.)
		Report	Abilaliaj 43'; Bulku 90'	Stadium: Niko Dovana Stadium

30 September 2006 5	Partizani Tirana	0–2	Tirana	Tirana
		Report	Salihi 10', 26'	Stadium: Qemal Stafa Stadium

14 October 2006 6	Shkumbini Peqin	0–2	Partizani Tirana	Peqin
		Report	Leandro 52', 73'	Stadium: Shkumbini Stadium

18 October 2006 7	Partizani Tirana	0–1	Elbasani	Tirana
		Report	Osmani 82'	Stadium: Qemal Stafa Stadium

21 October 2006 8	Kastrioti Krujë	2–2	Partizani Tirana	Krujë
	Zyambo 7'; Abazaj 20'	Report	Leandro 17'; Dhëmbi 86' (pen.)	Stadium: Kastrioti Stadium

28 October 2006 9	Partizani Tirana	0–0	Vllaznia Shkodër	Tirana
		Report		Stadium: Qemal Stafa Stadium

4 November 2006 10	Dinamo Tirana	0–0	Partizani Tirana	Tirana
		Report		Stadium: Selman Stërmasi Stadium

11 November 2006 11	Partizani Tirana	0–3	Flamurtari Vlorë	Tirana
		Report	Delain 18' (pen.); Xhafa 73'; N'Koulou 75'	Stadium: Qemal Stafa Stadium

18 November 2006 12	Apolonia Fier	0–2	Partizani Tirana	Fier
		Report	Dhëmbi 79'; Muzaka 90+2'	Stadium: Loni Papuçiu Stadium

26 November 2006 13	Partizani Tirana	2–0	Teuta Durrës	Tirana
	Bakaj 65'; Gjyla 67'	Report		Stadium: Qemal Stafa Stadium

2 December 2006 14	Luftëtari Gjirokastër	0–0	Partizani Tirana	Gjirokastra
		Report		Stadium: Gjirokastra Stadium

8 December 2006 15	Partizani Tirana	0–0	Besa Kavajë	Tirana
		Report		Stadium: Qemal Stafa Stadium

17 December 2006 16	Tirana	3–2	Partizani Tirana	Tirana
	Sinani 12'; Salihi 41'; Duro 65'	Report	Bylykbashi 35' (pen.); Dhëmbi 90+2'	Stadium: Qemal Stafa Stadium

23 December 2006 17	Partizani Tirana	2–0	Shkumbini Peqin	Tirana
	Bakaj 23'; Muzaka 61'	Report		Stadium: Qemal Stafa Stadium

3 February 2007 18	Elbasani	0–2	Partizani Tirana	Elbasan
		Report	Malindi 72', 75'	Stadium: Rudi Bizhuta Stadium

10 February 2007 19	Partizani Tirana	1–0	Kastrioti Krujë	Tirana
	Dhëmbi 10'	Report		Stadium: Qemal Stafa Stadium

21 February 2007 20	Vllaznia Shkodër	1–0	Partizani Tirana	Shkodër
	Dalipi 30'	Report		Stadium: Loro Boriçi Stadium

24 February 2007 21	Partizani Tirana	2–1	Dinamo Tirana	Tirana
	Tafaj 21'; Abilaliaj 31'	Report	Mile 25'	Stadium: Qemal Stafa Stadium

3 March 2007 22	Flamurtari Vlorë	1–0	Partizani Tirana	Vlorë
	Delain 45' (pen.)	Report		Stadium: Flamurtari Stadium

11 March 2007 23	Partizani Tirana	4–1	Kastrioti Krujë	Tirana
	Abilaliaj 14', 30'; Bakaj 35', 70'	Report	Zyambo 44'	Stadium: Qemal Stafa Stadium

17 March 2007 24	Flamurtari Vlorë	0–2	Partizani Tirana	Vlorë
		Report	Muzaka 23' (pen.); Bulku 86'	Stadium: Flamurtari Stadium

31 March 2007 25	Partizani Tirana	1–0	Elbasani	Tirana
	Abilaliaj 5'	Report		Stadium: Qemal Stafa Stadium

7 April 2007 26	Dinamo Tirana	0–2	Partizani Tirana	Tirana
		Report	Babamusta 2', 46'	Stadium: Selman Stërmasi Stadium

14 April 2007 27	Partizani Tirana	2–1	Besa Kavajë	Tirana
	Bakaj 10'; Gjyla 47'	Report	Veliaj 55'	Stadium: Qemal Stafa Stadium

21 April 2007 28	Partizani Tirana	2–0	Apolonia Fier	Tirana
	Gjyla 44'; Beqiri 77'	Report		Stadium: Qemal Stafa Stadium

28 April 2007 29	Teuta Durrës	1–0	Partizani Tirana	Durrës
	Devolli 21'	Report		Stadium: Niko Dovana Stadium

5 May 2007 30	Partizani Tirana	0–1	Vllaznia Shkodër	Tirana
		Report	Bejzade 55'	Stadium: Qemal Stafa Stadium

9 May 2007 31	Tirana	1–0	Partizani Tirana	Tirana
	Çapja 67'	Report		Stadium: Qemal Stafa Stadium

12 May 2007 32	Partizani Tirana	5–0	Shkumbini Peqin	Tirana
	Progni 6'; Muzaka 32'; Abilaliaj 56'; Gjyla 73' (pen.); Karapici 83'	Report		Stadium: Qemal Stafa Stadium

19 May 2007 33	Luftëtari Gjirokastër	3–1	Partizani Tirana	Gjirokastra
	Novi 10'; Braho 20', 40'	Report	Karapici 85'	Stadium: Gjirokastra Stadium

=== Albanian Cup ===
==== Third round ====
20 September 2006 First leg	Gramozi Ersekë	1–2	Partizani Tirana	Skrapar
	Sadiku 55'	Report	Bakaj 28'; Aga 72'	Stadium: Skrapar Sports Field

27 September 2006 Second leg	Partizani Tirana	2–2 (4–3 agg.)	Gramozi Ersekë	Tirana
	Bakaj 22'; Júnior 51'	Report	Marcos 21', 70'	Stadium: Qemal Stafa Stadium

==== Fourth round ====
25 October 2006 First leg	Lushnja	0–1	Partizani Tirana	Lushnjë
		Report	Júnior 54'	Stadium: Abdurrahman Roza Haxhiu Stadium

22 November 2006 Second leg	Partizani Tirana	1–0 (2–0 agg.)	Lushnja	Kamëz
	Bakaj 79'	Report		Stadium: National Sports Centre

==== Quarter-finals ====
14 February 2007 First leg	Vllaznia Shkodër	1–1	Partizani Tirana	Shkodër
	Vukčević 32'	Report	Dhëmbi 38'	Stadium: Loro Boriçi Stadium

28 February 2007 Second leg	Partizani Tirana	0–0 (1a–1 agg.)	Vllaznia Shkodër	Tirana
		Report		Stadium: Qemal Stafa Stadium

==== Semi-finals ====
11 April 2007 First leg	Teuta Durrës	0–0	Partizani Tirana	Durrës
		Report		Stadium: Niko Dovana Stadium

25 April 2007 Second leg	Partizani Tirana	1–1 (1–1a agg.)	Teuta Durrës	Tirana
	Dhëmbi 5'	Report	Buna 15'	Stadium: Qemal Stafa Stadium

=== UEFA Intertoto Cup ===
==== First round ====
17 June 2006 First leg	Ethnikos Achna (Cyprus)	4–2	(Albania) Partizani Tirana	Achna, Cyprus
17:00 CEST	Kmetec 21', 48', 59'; Stjepanović 30'	Report	Bakaj 66'; Sheta 78'	Stadium: Dasaki Stadium; Referee: Aleksandr Gonchar (Russia)

24 June 2006 Second leg	Partizani Tirana (Albania)	2–1 (4–5 agg.)	(Cyprus) Ethnikos Achna	Tirana, Albania
18:00 CEST	Bylykbashi 29'; Abilaliaj 90'	Report	Stjepanović 3'	Stadium: Selman Stërmasi Stadium; Referee: Marijo Strahonja (Croatia)
