= List of FK Partizani Tirana seasons =

This is a list of all seasons played by FK Partizani Tirana in national and European football, from 1947 to the most recent completed season.

This list details the club's achievements in all major competitions.

== Seasons ==
Season	Division									Cup	European competitions		Top goalscorer(s)	
Season	Division	Pos	Pld	W	D	L	GF	GA	Pts	Cup	Competition	Round	Player	Goals
1947	National Championship	1st	16	14	1	1	56	15	29	—N/a				
1948	National Championship	1st	11	9	1	1	40	10	17	W				
1949	National Championship	1st	16	14	2	0	61	7	30	W				
1950	National Championship	2nd	16	14	1	1	77	10	29	RU				
1951	National Championship	2nd	26	24	0	2	136	10	48	RU				
1952	National Championship	2nd	22	19	1	2	89	11	39	QF				
1953	National Championship	2nd	18	14	1	3	51	16	29	RU				
1954	National Championship	1st	22	21	1	0	93	8	43	RU				
1955	National Championship	2nd	30	26	3	1	96	15	55	—N/a				
1956	National Championship	2nd	16	10	3	3	37	10	23	—N/a				
1957	National Championship	1st	14	10	3	1	28	7	23	W				
1958	National Championship	1st	14	7	5	2	27	12	19	W				
1959	National Championship	1st	14	9	5	0	27	6	23	—N/a				
1960	National Championship	2nd	18	12	4	2	41	12	28	SF				
1961	National Championship	1st	18	14	2	2	46	13	30	W	Balkans Cup	3rd		
1962–63	National Championship	1st	22	15	6	1	53	15	36	SF	European Cup	1R		
1963–64	National Championship	1st	22	15	7	0	46	10	37	W	European Cup	1R		
1964–65	National Championship	2nd	22	11	8	3	31	15	30	SF	European Cup	1R		
1965–66	National Championship	2nd	22	17	4	1	45	12	38	W				
1966–67	National Championship	5th	19	9	7	3	36	18	25	—N/a	Balkans Cup	GS		
1968	National Championship	2nd	26	19	6	1	62	19	44	W	Cup Winners' Cup	1R		
1969–70	National Championship	2nd	26	14	10	2	51	19	38	W	Balkans Cup	W		
1970–71	National Championship	1st	22	16	8	2	48	19	40	SF	Cup Winners' Cup	1R		
1971–72	National Championship	4th	26	13	8	5	35	21	34	SF	European Cup	1R		
1972–73	National Championship	2nd	26	12	10	4	44	17	34	W				
1973–74	National Championship	2nd	26	13	9	4	37	16	35	RU	Balkans Cup	GS		
1974–75	National Championship	3rd	26	12	10	4	36	16	34	SF				
1975–76	National Championship	5th	22	6	11	5	15	16	23	QF				
1976–77	National Championship	4th	32	10	13	9	32	27	33	QF				
1977–78	National Championship	3rd	22	11	3	8	30	22	25	2R				
1978–79	National Championship	1st	26	14	8	4	38	20	36	SF	Balkans Cup	GS	Agim Murati	14
1979–80	National Championship	4th	26	9	11	6	41	30	29	W	European Cup	1R		
1980–81	National Championship	1st	26	15	7	4	36	17	37	2R	Cup Winners' Cup	1R		
1981–82	National Championship	4th	26	11	9	6	31	18	31	2R	European Cup	1R		
1982–83	National Championship	2nd	26	13	8	5	32	17	34	SF				
1983–84	National Championship	3rd	26	10	10	6	25	23	30	SF			Hasan Lika	8
1984–85	National Championship	4th	26	12	5	9	26	19	29	RU				
1985–86	National Championship	4th	26	11	9	6	34	28	31	SF				
1986–87	National Championship	1st	26	15	6	5	43	18	36	SF			Ylli Shehu	14
1987–88	National Championship	9th	36	12	13	11	51	44	37	RU	European Cup	1R	Ylli Shehu	14
1988–89	National Championship	2nd	32	18	9	5	48	23	45	RU				
1989–90	National Championship	2nd	33	20(4)	5	4(1)	56	25	49^{(-2)}	QF				
1990–91	National Championship	2nd	39	18	12	9	52	25	48	W	UEFA Cup	1R	Eduard Kaçaçi	13
1991–92	National Championship	2nd	30	14	10	6	41	25	38	SF	Cup Winners' Cup	1R	Edmond Dosti	13
1992–93	National Championship	1st	30	17	9	4	53	22	43	W			Edmond Dosti	21
1993–94	National Championship	5th	26	6	13	7	27	25	25	SF	Champions League	PR	Nikolin Coçlli	9
1994–95	National Championship	3rd	30	12	8	10	36	30	32	SF			Nikolin Coçlli; Edmond Kodra	8
1995–96	National Championship	9th	34	16(5)	9	9	43	24	46	QF	UEFA Cup	PR		
1996–97	National Championship	4th	22	12	4	6	28	20	40	W			Erjon Bogdani	7
1997–98	National Championship	3rd	34	20	4	10	51	44	37	QF			Erjon Bogdani	13
1998–99	National Championship	10th	30	10	9	11	37	46	44	QF				
1999–00	National Championship	14th	26	6	6	14	21	37	24	2R			Alban Rexha	9
2000–01	Kategoria e Parë	1st	21	17	2	2	69	7	53	2R				
2001–02	National Championship	3rd	26	13	7	6	41	24	46	2R			Abílio	11
2002–03	National Championship	3rd	26	12	10	4	41	27	46	QF	UEFA Cup	QR	Carioca	6
2003–04	Kategoria Superiore	4th	36	20	7	9	65	39	67	W	Intertoto Cup	2R	Abílio	19
2004–05	Kategoria Superiore	8th	36	13	7	16	59	58	46	SF	UEFA Cup	2QR	Dorian Bylykbashi	24
2005–06	Kategoria Superiore	4th	36	18	6	12	51	35	60	QF			Arbër Abilaliaj	8
2006–07	Kategoria Superiore	4th	33	17	6	10	44	25	57	SF	Intertoto Cup	1R	Arbër Abilaliaj	10
2007–08	Kategoria Superiore	2nd	33	18	11	4	47	22	65	QF			Elis Bakaj	12
2008–09	Kategoria Superiore	10th^{[A]}	33	9	9	15	27	36	36	QF	UEFA Cup	1QR	Marius Ngjela	10
2009–10	Kategoria e Parë	5th	30	17	6	7	49	35	57	2R			Artan Karapici	11
2010–11	Kategoria e Parë	14th	30	4	5	21	16	45	17	1R			Rigers Dushku	4
2011–12	Kategoria e Dytë	2nd^{[B]}	23	16	4	3	35	13	52	1PR			Idriz Batha	7
2012–13	Kategoria e Parë	2nd	30	16	8	6	39	33	56	1R			Julian Malo	7
2013–14	Kategoria Superiore	5th	33	15	8	10	33	26	53	2R			Migen Memelli; Nderim Nexhipi	6
2014–15	Kategoria Superiore	3rd	36	22	7	7	42	24	73	QF			Stevan Račić	14
2015–16	Kategoria Superiore	2nd	36	21	11	4	51	21	74	QF	Europa League	1QR	Xhevahir Sukaj	21
2016–17	Kategoria Superiore	2nd	36	19	15	2	46	17	72	2R	Champions League; Europa League	3QR; PO	Caleb Ekuban	17
2017–18	Kategoria Superiore	5th	36	15	8	13	41	36	53	QF	Europa League	1QR	Gerhard Progni	8
2018–19	Kategoria Superiore	1st	36	20	10	6	45	22	70	QF	Europa League	1QR	Jasir Asani	8
2019–20	Kategoria Superiore	6th	36	15	8	13	51	40	53	2R	Champions League; Europa League	1QR; 2QR	Eraldo Çinari	10
2020–21	Kategoria Superiore	3rd	36	17	14	5	53	23	65	QF			Jasir Asani	9
2021–22	Kategoria Superiore	3rd	36	15	13	8	52	30	58	SF	Europa Conference League	2QR	Stênio Júnior	12
2022–23	Kategoria Superiore	1st	36	20	7	9	56	37	67	QF	Europa Conference League	1QR	Victor da Silva	13
2023–24	Kategoria Superiore	2nd^{[C]}	36	17	2	7	51	29	63	QF	Champions League; Europa Conference League	1QR; PO	Archange Bintsouka	10
2024–25	Kategoria Superiore	3rd	36	13	14	9	38	33	53	SF	Europa Conference League	2QR	Archange Bintsouka	6

- ^{A} Partizani were relegated after a loss in the relegation play-off match against Kastrioti Krujë 0–1.
- ^{B} Partizani were lost a championship final against Tërbuni Pukë 3–1, and therefore were placed at the second place in the league.
- ^{C} Partizani were lost a final of the final tournament against Egnatia 1–0, and therefore were placed at the second place in the league.
