= 2006–07 Albanian Cup =

Kupa e Shqipërisë

Tournament details
- Country: Albania

Final positions
- Champions: Besa
- Runners-up: Teuta

2006–07 Albanian Cup (Albanian: Kupa e Shqipërisë) was the fifty-fifth season of Albania's annual cup competition. It began on August 27, 2006 with the First Preliminary Round and ended on May 16, 2007 with the Final match. The winners of the competition qualified for the 2007–08 first qualifying round of the UEFA Europa League. KF Tirana were the defending champions, having won their thirteenth Albanian Cup their previous season. The cup was won by Besa.

The first two rounds were played in one-legged format, then other rounds were played in a two-legged format similar to those of European competitions. If the aggregated score was tied after both games, the team with the higher number of away goals advanced. If the number of away goals was equal in both games, the match was decided by extra time and a penalty shootout, if necessary.

== Preliminary Tournament ==
=== First Preliminary Round ===
Games were played on August 27, 2006.

Team 1	Score	Team 2
Egnatia	3–0	Skrapari
Përparimi	w/o	Plugu
Iliria	4–0	Olimpik
Dajti	5–0	Çlirimi
Poliçani	2–1	Naftëtari
Veleçiku	2–1	Korabi
Butrinti	2–1 (a.e.t.)	Këlcyra
Gramozi	2–1	Pojani
Përmeti	3–2	Minatori Memaliaj
Çakrani	2–1 (a.e.t.)	Albpetrol
Delvina	3–0	Bylis
Poliçani	3–0	Domozdova

=== Second Preliminary Round ===
Games were played on September 10, 2006.

Team 1	Score	Team 2
Egnatia	2–1	Veleçiku
Iliria	2–0	Poliçani
Butrinti	w/o	Maliqi
Gramozi	2–1 (a.e.t.)	Delvina
Përmeti	0–0 (2–3 p)	Çakrani
Dajti	w/o	Përparimi

== First round ==
All fourteen teams of the 2005–06 Superliga and First Division entered in this round, along with Second Preliminary Round winners. Games were played on September 20 & September 27, 2006.

Team 1	Agg.	Team 2	1st leg	2nd leg
Egnatia	0–6	Besa	0–5	0–1
Iliria	2–6	Dinamo Tirana	2–3	0–3
Sopoti	2–9	Shkumbini	2–2	0–7
Dajti	1–2	Elbasani	1–1	0–1
Laçi	2–3	Kastrioti	1–2	1–1
Tepelena	1–3	Skënderbeu	1–1	0–2 (w/o)
Turbina	9–4	Pogradeci	7–2	2–2
Burreli	1–5	Flamurtari	0–0	1–5
Çakrani	1–3	Tirana	1–0	0–3
Gramozi	3–4	Partizani	1–2	2–2
Bilisht Sport	1–2	Apolonia	1–0	0–2
Besëlidhja	2–5	Luftëtari	2–0	0–5 (a.e.t.)
Gramshi	1–6	Teuta	0–1	1–5
Butrinti	2–10	Vllaznia	1–3	1–7
Erzeni	5–3	Tomori	5–1	0–2
Ada	3–6	Lushnja	2–1	1–5

== Second round ==
First legs were played on October 25, 2006 and the second legs were played on November 22, 2006.

Team 1	Agg.	Team 2	1st leg	2nd leg
Turbina	2–0	Elbasani	2–0	0–0
Flamurtari	1–5	Shkumbini	1–4	0–1
Skënderbeu	2–4	Dinamo Tirana	2–3	0–1
Kastrioti	3–4	Besa	3–0	0–4
Erzeni	1–4	Tirana	1–2	0–2
Apolonia	1–2	Teuta	1–2	0–0
Lushnja	0–2	Partizani	0–1	0–1
Luftëtari	1–4	Vllaznia	1–1	0–3

== Quarter-finals ==
In this round entered the 8 winners from the previous round.

Team 1	Agg.	Team 2	1st leg	2nd leg
Shkumbini	6–1	Turbina	4–0	2–1
Teuta	4–3	Tirana	2–1	2–2
Besa	3–2	Dinamo Tirana	1–2	2–0
Vllaznia	1–1 (a)	Partizani	1–1	0–0

== Semi-finals ==
In this round entered the four winners from the previous round.

Team 1	Agg.	Team 2	1st leg	2nd leg
Teuta	1–1 (a)	Partizani	0–0	1–1
Shkumbini	4–4 (a)	Besa	3–3	1–1

11 April 2007	Teuta	0–0	Partizani	Niko Dovana Stadium, Durrës

25 April 2007	Partizani	1–1	Teuta	Qemal Stafa Stadium, Tirana
	Dhembi 5'		Buna 15'

Teuta advanced to the final.

11 April 2007	Shkumbini	3–3	Besa	Shkumbini Stadium, Peqin
	Dervishi 9', 25'; Cela 85'		Veliaj 39', 69'; Arapi 90+2'

25 April 2007	Besa	1–1	Shkumbini	Besa Stadium, Kavajë
	Nuhiji 59'		Rizvanolli 85'

Besa advanced to the final.

== Final ==
16 May 2007
18:00

Besa	3–2	Teuta
Xhihani 1'; Belisha 41'; Veliaj 68'		Xhafa 8'; Bikoula 89' (o.g.)

Qemal Stafa Stadium, Tirana
Attendance: 12,500
Referee: Albano Janku
