= 2009 UEFA European Under-21 Championship qualification Group 1 =

Football tournament qualification stage

The teams competing in group 1 of the 2009 UEFA European Under-21 Championships qualifying competition are Albania, Azerbaijan, Croatia, Faroe Islands, Greece and Italy.

== Standings ==
| Team | Pld | W | D | L | GF | GA | GD | Pts |
|---|---|---|---|---|---|---|---|---|
| Italy | 10 | 7 | 3 | 0 | 21 | 5 | +16 | 24 |
| Croatia | 10 | 7 | 1 | 2 | 20 | 12 | +8 | 22 |
| Greece | 10 | 5 | 3 | 2 | 20 | 13 | +7 | 18 |
| Albania | 10 | 3 | 3 | 4 | 10 | 13 | −3 | 12 |
| Faroe Islands | 10 | 1 | 1 | 8 | 5 | 18 | −13 | 4 |
| Azerbaijan | 10 | 0 | 3 | 7 | 6 | 21 | −15 | 3 |

Key: Pts Points, Pld Matches played, W Won, D Drawn, L Lost, GF Goals for, GA Goals against, GD Goal Difference

== Matches ==
1 June 2007
18:00 UTC+2

| Italy | 4 – 0 | Albania |
|---|---|---|
| Acquafresca 8'; Dessena 17'; Criscito 35'; Lupoli 81' | Report |

E. Mannucci, Pontedera
Referee: Cyril Zimmermann (Switzerland)
2 June 2007
15:45 UTC+3

| Greece | 4 – 1 | Azerbaijan |
|---|---|---|
| Christodoulopoulos 4', 89'; Yusifov 72' (o.g.); Petropoulos 75' | Report | Abdullayev 56' |

Peristeri Stadium, Athens
Referee: Mihaly Fabian (Hungary)
2 June 2007
16:30 UTC+2

| Croatia | 2 – 0 | Faroe Islands |
|---|---|---|
| Rukavina 24'; Begović 90+2' | Report |

Stadion Varteks, Varaždin
Referee: Anthony Zammit (Malta)

6 June 2007
16:30 UTC+2

| Croatia | 3 – 2 | Greece |
|---|---|---|
| Iličević 25', 60'; Bušić 84' | Report | Aravidis 2'; Petropoulos 90' |

Stadion ŠRC Zaprešić, Zaprešić
Referee: Jorge Sousa (Portugal)
6 June 2007
17:00 UTC+2

| Albania | 1 – 0 | Faroe Islands |
|---|---|---|
| Bakaj 67' (pen.) | Report |

Stadiumi Ruzhdi Bizhuta, Elbasan
Referee: Stelios Trifonos (Cyprus)

7 September 2007
21:00 UTC+2

| Italy | 2 – 1 | Faroe Islands |
|---|---|---|
| Russotto 21'; Cigarini 81' | Report | Hansen 31' |

Stadio Briamasco, Trento
Referee: Rusmir Mrković (Bosnia and Herzegovina)
8 September 2007
15:00 UTC+5

| Azerbaijan | 0 – 2 | Greece |
|---|---|---|
| | Report | Christodoulopoulos 10'; Aravidis 53' |

Tofik Bakhramov Stadium, Baku
Referee: Marcin Borski (Poland)
8 September 2007
16:30 UTC+2

| Albania | 1 – 0 | Croatia |
|---|---|---|
| Cani 75' | Report |

Stadiumi Ruzhdi Bizhuta, Elbasan
Referee: Richard Havrilla (Slovakia)

11 September 2007
16:00 UTC+2

| Albania | 0 – 1 | Italy |
|---|---|---|
| | Report | Acquafresca 64' |

Stadiumi Niko Dovana, Durrës
Referee: Robert Schörgenhofer (Austria)
11 September 2007
16:30 UTC+2

| Croatia | 3 – 2 | Azerbaijan |
|---|---|---|
| Tadić 12'; Iličević 21'; Abishov 45' (o.g.) | Report | Mammadov 34', 62' |

Stadion ŠRC Zaprešić, Zaprešić
Referee: Serbastien Coltescu (Romania)
11 September 2007
15:00 UTC+1

| Faroe Islands | 0 – 2 | Greece |
|---|---|---|
| | Report | Petropoulos 30'; Papastathopoulos 39' |

Svangaskarð, Toftir
Referee: Simon Evans (Wales)

12 October 2007
21:00 UTC+2

| Italy | 2 – 0 | Croatia |
|---|---|---|
| Acquafresca 39', 57' | Report |

Stadio Guido Angelini, Chieti
Referee: Bernardino González Vázquez (Spain)
14 October 2007
12:00 UTC+1

| Faroe Islands | 1 – 0 | Azerbaijan |
|---|---|---|
| Olsen 45' | Report |

Svangaskarð, Toftir
Referee: Selçuk Dereli (Turkey)

16 October 2007
20:45 UTC+3

| Greece | 2 – 2 | Italy |
|---|---|---|
| Petropoulos 19'; Mitroglou 88' (pen.) | Report | Rossi 62'; Dessena 81' |

Leoforos Alexandras Stadium, Athens
Referee: Wolfgang Stark (Germany)
17 October 2007
12:00 UTC+5

| Azerbaijan | 1 – 1 | Albania |
|---|---|---|
| Nadirov 74' | Report | Shoshi 81' |

Ismat Gayibov Stadium, Baku
Referee: Robert Krajnc (Slovenia)
17 October 2007
16:00 UTC+1

| Faroe Islands | 1 – 2 | Croatia |
|---|---|---|
| Hansen 4' | Report | Kalinić 14'; Bušić 21' |

Tórsvøllur, Tórshavn
Referee: Jiří Jech (Czech Republic)

16 November 2007
21:00 UTC+1

| Italy | 5 – 0 | Azerbaijan |
|---|---|---|
| Amirguliyev 41' (o.g.); Acquafresca 45+2'; Cerci 77'; Russotto 84'; Dessena 90+2' | Report |

Stadio Bruno Recchioni, Fermo
Referee: Leontios Trattou (Cyprus)
17 November 2007
14:00 UTC+0

| Faroe Islands | 0 – 5 | Albania |
|---|---|---|
| | Report | Sukaj 25', 49', 58'; Abilaliaj 51'; Progni 85' |

Svangaskarð, Toftir
Referee: Albert Toussaint (Luxembourg)
17 November 2007
14:45 UTC+2

| Greece | 3 – 4 | Croatia |
|---|---|---|
| Petropoulos 31'; Tripotseris 47'; Dimoutsos 66' | Report | Ljubičić 4'; Bušić 42'; Rukavina 81', 84' |

Panionios Stadium, Athens
Referee: Bjorn Kuipers (Netherlands)

21 November 2007
14:00 UTC+4

| Azerbaijan | 0 – 1 | Croatia |
|---|---|---|
| | Report | Bušić 85' |

Ismat Gayibov Stadium, Baku
Referee: Tsvetan Georgiev (Bulgarian)
21 November 2007
13:00 UTC+0

| Faroe Islands | 0 – 1 | Italy |
|---|---|---|
| | Report | Pozzi 79' |

Tórsvøllur, Tórshavn
Referee: Mario Vlk (Slovakia)
21 November 2007
16:15 UTC+2

| Greece | 2 – 1 | Albania |
|---|---|---|
| Christodoulopoulos 28' (pen.); Mitroglou 54' | Report | Sukaj 34' |

Leoforos Alexandras Stadium, Athens
Referee: Veaceslav Banari (Moldova)

25 March 2008
18:00 UTC+2

| Azerbaijan | 0 – 2 | Italy |
|---|---|---|
| | Report | Rossi 18', 63' (pen.) |

Tofik Bakhramov Stadium, Baku
Referee: Pavle Radovanović (Montenegro)

20 August 2008
16:00 UTC+2

| Albania | 1 – 1 | Greece |
|---|---|---|
| Sukaj 65' | Report | Christodoulopoulos 25' |

Stadiumi Ruzhdi Bizhuta, Elbasan
Referee: Asaf Kenan (Israel)

5 September 2008
19:00 UTC+2

| Croatia | 4 – 0 | Albania |
|---|---|---|
| Ljubičić 14'; Iličević 59'; Smrekar 79'; Brezovec 83' | Report |

Stadion Varteks, Varaždin
Referee: Augustus Viorel Constantin (Romania)
5 September 2008
21:00 UTC+2

| Italy | 1 – 1 | Greece |
|---|---|---|
| Balotelli 34' | Report | Christodoulopoulos 54' |

Stadio Teofilo Patini, Castel di Sangro
Referee: Jorge Sousa (Portugal)
6 September 2008
15:00 UTC+2

| Azerbaijan | 2 – 2 | Faroe Islands |
|---|---|---|
| Abishov 18'; Nadirov 32' | Report | Nielsen 25'; Hanssen 80' |

Tofik Bakhramov Stadium, Baku
Referee: Siniša Zrnić (Bosnia and Herzegovina)

9 September 2008
19:00 UTC+2

| Croatia | 1 – 1 | Italy |
|---|---|---|
| Tomasov 82' | Report | Motta 38' |

Stadion Varteks, Varaždin
Referee: Said Ennjimi (France)
9 September 2008
20:00 UTC+3

| Greece | 1 – 0 | Faroe Islands |
|---|---|---|
| Petropoulos 55' | Report |

Kaisariani Stadium, Athens
Referee: George Vadachkoria (Georgia)
10 September 2008
16:30 UTC+2

| Albania | 0 – 0 | Azerbaijan |
|---|---|---|
| | Report |

Stadiumi Flamurtari, Vlorë
Referee: Gediminas Mažeika (Lithuania)

== Goalscorers ==
| Pos | Player | Country | Goals |
|---|---|---|---|
| 1 | Lazaros Christodoulopoulos | Greece | 6 |
| 1 | Antonis Petropoulos | Greece | 6 |
| 3 | Xhevahir Sukaj | Albania | 5 |
| 3 | Robert Acquafresca | Italy | 5 |
| 5 | Tomislav Bušić | Croatia | 4 |
| 5 | Ivo Iličević | Croatia | 4 |
| 7 | Ante Rukavina | Croatia | 3 |
| 7 | Daniele Dessena | Italy | 3 |
| 7 | Giuseppe Rossi | Italy | 3 |
| 10 | Nodar Mammadov | Azerbaijan | 2 |
| 10 | Vüqar Nadirov | Azerbaijan | 2 |
| 10 | Krešo Ljubičić | Croatia | 2 |
| 10 | Christos Aravidis | Greece | 2 |
| 10 | Kostantinos Mitroglou | Greece | 2 |
| 10 | Andrea Russotto | Italy | 2 |

1 goal

- Albania: Arber Abilaliaj, Elis Bakaj, Nevian Cani, Gerhard Progni, Maringlen Shoshi
- Azerbaijan: Elnur Abdullayev, Ruslan Abishov
- Croatia: Ivan Begović, Josip Brezovec, Nikola Kalinić, Matija Smrekar, Josip Tadić, Marin Tomasov
- Faroe Islands: Arnbjørn Hansen, Einar Hansen, Levi Hanssen, Gudmund Nielsen, Magnus Olsen
- Greece: Elini Dimoutsos, Sokratis Papastathopoulos, Theodoros Tripotseris
- Italy: Mario Balotelli, Alessio Cerci, Luca Cigarini, Domenico Criscito, Arturo Lupoli, Marco Motta, Nicola Pozzi

Own goals

- Azerbaijan: Ruslan Abishov, Rahid Amirguliyev, Namiq Yusifov
