= 2007–08 Albanian Cup =

Kupa e Shqipërisë

Tournament details
- Country: Albania

Final positions
- Champions: Vllaznia
- Runners-up: KF Tirana

2007–08 Albanian Cup (Albanian: Kupa e Shqipërisë) was the fifty-sixth season of Albania's annual cup competition. It began in August 2007 with the First Preliminary Round and ended on 7 May 2006 with the Final match. The winners of the competition qualified for the 2008-09 first qualifying round of the UEFA Europa League. KS Besa were the defending champions, having won their first Albanian Cup last season. The cup was won by KS Vllaznia.

The rounds were played in a two-legged format similar to those of European competitions. If the aggregated score was tied after both games, the team with the higher number of away goals advanced. If the number of away goals was equal in both games, the match was decided by extra time and a penalty shootout, if necessary.

== Preliminary Tournament ==
=== First Preliminary Round ===
Team 1	Score	Team 2
Çakrani	0–3	Egnatia
Poliçani	0–2	Pojani
Iliria	4–1	Domozdova
Butrinti	w/o	Çlirimi
Përparimi	w/o	Korabi
Maliqi	5–2	Gramozi
Veleçiku	3–1	Olimpik
Përmeti	1–1 (a.e.t.) (5–6 p)	Delvina

=== Second Preliminary Round ===
Team 1	Score	Team 2
Egnatia	w/o	Delvina
Pojani	1–0	Veleçiku
Iliria	w/o	Maliqi
Butrinti	w/o	Përparimi

=== Third Preliminary Round ===
Team 1	Score	Team 2
Butrinti	w/o	Egnatia
Iliria	4–1	Pojani

== First round ==
The first legs were played on 27–28 November with the second legs between 2–5 December 2007.

Team 1	Agg.	Team 2	1st leg	2nd leg
Butrinti	4–6	Tirana	2–2	2–4
Ada	3–4	Flamurtari	2–0	1–4
Gramshi	2–6	Luftëtari	2–0	0–6
Pogradeci	2–8	Besëlidhja	2–0	0–8
Laçi	4–2	Lushnja	3–1	1–1
Erzeni	1–3	Turbina	1–1	0–2
Skrapari	4–1	Partizani	0–2	2–1
Sopoti	2–4	Apolonia	2–1	0–3
Dajti	1–5	Dinamo Tirana	0–2	1–3
Bilisht Sport	5–8	Shkumbini	4–5	1–3
Iliria	2–4	Teuta	1–1	1–3
Tepelena	3–3	Skënderbeu	3–2	0–1
Tomori	2–7	Elbasani	0–0	2–7
Burreli	3–4	Kastrioti	3–2	0–2
Bylis	2–6	Besa	2–3	0–3
Naftëtari	3–9	Vllaznia	2–3	1–6

== Second round ==
The first legs were played on 13 February with the second legs on 27 February 2008.

Team 1	Agg.	Team 2	1st leg	2nd leg
Laçi	2–5	Tirana	1–1	1–3
Turbina	0–4	Teuta	0–0	0–4
Besëlidhja	0–1	Vllaznia	0–1	0–0
Skënderbeu	1–5	Partizani	1–0	0–5
Apolonia	3–4	Dinamo Tirana	0–1	3–3
Luftëtari	1–3	Besa	1–1	0–2
Shkumbini	2–3	Elbasani	2–0	0–3
Flamurtari	1–2	Kastrioti	1–1	0–1

== Quarter-finals ==
The first legs were played on 5 March and the second legs were played on 12 March 2008.

Team 1	Agg.	Team 2	1st leg	2nd leg
Kastrioti	1–4	Tirana	0–3	1–1
Elbasani	3–3	Teuta	1–1	2–2
Besa	3–7	Vllaznia	2–2	1–5
Dinamo Tirana	3–1	Partizani	0–0	3–1

== Semi-finals ==
Team 1	Agg.	Team 2	1st leg	2nd leg
Vllaznia	7–0	Dinamo Tirana	4–0	3–0
Elbasani	3–4	Tirana	0–3	3–1

9 April 2008	Vllaznia	4–0	Dinamo Tirana	Loro Boriçi Stadium, Shkodër
16:30 CEST	Sinani 3' (pen.); Kaçi 7', 21'; Sukaj 43'

23 April 2008	Dinamo Tirana	0–3	Vllaznia	Tofik Jashari Stadium, Shijak
16:30 CEST			Bejtja 24' (o.g.); Bodrušić 83' (o.g.); Jusufi 90'

Vllaznia advanced to the final.

9 April 2008	Elbasani	0–3	Tirana	Ruzhdi Bizhuta Stadium, Elbasan
16:00 CEST			Xhafaj 71'; Duro 73' (pen.), 85'

23 April 2008	Tirana	1–3	Elbasani	Selman Stermasi Stadium, Tirana
16:00 CEST	Duro 48' (pen.)		Xhafa 44', 89'; Nuhiu 66'

Tirana advanced to the final.

== Final ==
7 May 2008
16:00

Vllaznia	2–0	Tirana
Lika 3'; Sukaj 38'

Stadioni Ruzhdi Bizhuta, Elbasan
Attendance: 15,000
Referee: Babak Rafati
