= 1972–73 Albanian National Championship =

Albanian National Championship
- Season: 1972–73
- Champions: Dinamo Tirana; 9th Albanian title
- Relegated: Apolonia
- European Cup: None
- UEFA Cup: None
- Cup Winners' Cup: None
- Matches: 182
- Goals: 366 (2.01 per match)
- Top goalscorer: Ilir Përnaska (12 goals)

The 1972–73 Albanian National Championship was the 34th season of the Albanian National Championship, the top professional league for association football clubs, since its establishment in 1930.

== Overview ==
It was contested by 14 teams, and Dinamo Tirana won the championship.

== League table ==
Pos	Team	Pld	W	D	L	GF	GA	GD	Pts	Qualification or relegation
1	Dinamo Tirana (C)	26	16	9	1	38	11	+27	41	Champions
2	Partizani	26	12	10	4	44	17	+27	34	
3	Besa	26	12	10	4	33	17	+16	34	
4	Vllaznia	26	12	9	5	39	24	+15	33	
5	Traktori	26	10	9	7	22	25	−3	29	
6	Flamurtari	26	9	8	9	32	31	+1	26	
7	Labinoti	26	6	12	8	27	29	−2	24	
8	Shkëndija Tiranë	26	6	11	9	19	24	−5	23	
9	Luftëtari	26	6	10	10	25	32	−7	22	
10	Skënderbeu	26	6	10	10	14	22	−8	22	
11	17 Nëntori	26	8	5	13	23	30	−7	21	
12	Besëlidhja	26	4	12	10	12	24	−12	20	
13	Lokomotiva Durrës	26	4	11	11	21	33	−12	19	
14	Apolonia (R)	26	6	4	16	17	47	−30	16	Relegation to the 1973–74 Kategoria e Dytë

Source: RSSSF.org
(C) Champions; (R) Relegated

Note: 'Traktori' is Lushnja, 'Labinoti' is Elbasani, '17 Nëntori' is Tirana, 'Lokomotiva Durrës' is Teuta

== Results ==
Home \ Away	17N	APO	BES	BSL	DIN	FLA	LAB	LOK	LUF	PAR	SKË	SHK	TRA	VLL
17 Nëntori		4–0	0–1	2–0	0–3	0–1	0–0	1–0	0–0	2–0	2–0	2–0	0–1	3–2
Apolonia	2–1		2–2	1–0	0–2	1–2	2–1	2–1	1–0	0–3	0–0	2–0	0–1	0–1
Besa	3–0	4–0		2–0	0–0	1–0	5–2	1–1	2–0	1–1	1–0	1–0	1–1	3–1
Besëlidhja	1–0	0–0	0–1		2–2	0–0	0–0	0–0	1–0	0–0	0–0	2–0	1–1	1–0
Dinamo	3–1	3–1	2–0	1–0		4–0	2–0	2–1	2–0	1–0	1–0	1–0	1–0	0–0
Flamurtari	4–1	1–0	1–1	1–0	1–1		2–0	2–2	1–1	0–1	1–0	0–1	4–0	1–0
Labinoti	1–1	2–1	1–0	0–0	0–1	2–2		2–1	2–1	3–0	1–1	0–0	4–1	2–2
Lokomotiva	0–1	1–0	1–0	3–1	1–1	0–0	0–0		2–2	0–0	1–0	0–0	0–0	0–1
Luftëtari	2–0	1–1	1–1	1–1	1–3	1–0	0–0	5–1		1–1	2–0	1–0	0–1	1–0
Partizani	1–1	4–1	2–0	5–0	0–0	3–1	2–2	6–2	4–0		1–0	4–0	3–0	1–1
Skënderbeu	1–0	1–0	0–1	1–1	1–0	2–2	2–1	2–1	1–1	0–0		0–0	1–0	0–0
Shkëndija	1–0	5–0	0–0	2–1	0–0	3–1	1–1	1–1	1–1	0–0	1–0		0–0	2–2
Traktori	2–0	1–0	0–0	0–0	1–1	1–0	1–0	2–1	2–1	0–2	1–1	3–1		2–2
Vllaznia	1–1	6–0	1–1	1–0	1–1	5–4	1–0	1–0	4–1	1–0	3–0	1–0	1–0	

Source: CalcioMondialeWeb.it
Legend: Blue = home team win; Yellow = draw; Red = away team win.
