= Amarildo Belisha =

Albanian footballer (born 1981)

Personal information
- Full name: Amarildo Belisha
- Date of birth: 11 July 1981 (age 45)
- Place of birth: Shkodër, Albania
- Height: 1.80 m (5 ft 11 in)
- Positions: Midfielder; defender

Youth career
- 1991–1998: Vllaznia Shkodër

Senior career*
Years	Team	Apps	(Gls)
1998–2004	Vllaznia Shkodër	103	(8)
2004–2005	Elbasani	27	(0)
2005–2006	Vllaznia Shkodër	30	(0)
2006–2008	Besa Kavajë	53	(4)
2008–2009	Vllaznia Shkodër	24	(1)
2009–2010	Flamurtari Vlorë	15	(0)
2010–2014	Vllaznia Shkodër	114	(1)
Total		366	(14)

International career^{‡}
2000–2003	Albania U21	16	(0)
- * Club domestic league appearances and goals as of 18 February 2016 ‡ National team caps and goals as of 18 February 2016

Amarildo Belisha (born 11 July 1981) is a retired Albanian footballer who played as a midfielder and defender. He spent the majority of his career with his boyhood club Vllaznia Shkodër, and represented the club in both the 2000 UEFA Intertoto Cup and the 2009–10 UEFA Europa League. He was given the nickname "Ildoja" during his time with Vllaznia Shkodër.

== Club career ==
Following the end of the first part of 2009–10 Albanian Superliga, Belisha left Flamurtari Vlorë after making only 15 league appearances, becoming the club's 7th departure during the winter transfer window.

On 6 January 2010, during the winter transfer window, Belisha agreed terms with his first club Vllaznia Shkodër and returned for a fourth stint at the club. He signed a new one-year contract in July 2012.

On 10 November 2013, Belisha recorded his 300th appearance with Vllaznia Shkodër during the 1–0 away defeat to his former side Besa Kavajë, playing 81 minutes.

On 10 May 2014, he played his last match as a professional footballer during the 1–3 home defeat to Teuta Durrës, playing full-90 minutes. A day later, Belisha announced his retirement from professional football at the age of 33, ending thus his 15-year career. Following his retirement, Belisha told the media that he would start his coaching career.

== International career ==
Belisha is the most-capped player in the history of Albania U21 with 16 appearances in all competitions.

== Personal life ==
On 30 September 2015, Belisha was arrested along with the citizen Ridvan Llazani after they were caught while trading and transporting smuggled goods. They were arrested in Kukës – Shkodër highway.

== Honours ==
Vllaznia Shkodër

- Albanian Superliga: 2000–01
- Albanian Supercup: 2001

Besa Kavajë

- Albanian Cup: 2006–07
