= Bruno Barbosa (footballer, born 1985) =

Brazilian footballer (born 1985)

Personal information
- Full name: Bruno Barbosa da Encarnação
- Date of birth: 13 May 1985 (age 41)
- Place of birth: Nova Iguaçu, Brazil
- Height: 1.78 m (5 ft 10 in)
- Position: Striker

Team information
- Current team: Santos (women) (assistant)

Youth career
- 2004: Flamengo

Senior career*
Years	Team	Apps	(Gls)
2005–2007	Flamengo	12	(3)
2006	→ Goytacaz (loan)		
2007	→ Fotaleza (loan)		
2008	CRAC	1	(0)
2008	Partizani		
2008–2009	Caniçal	7	(1)
2009	Miguel Couto	5	(1)
2010	Marinho		(0)
2011	Rio Branco-ES	8	(2)
2012–2013	Ceres		
2013	→ Duquecaxiense (loan)		

Managerial career
- 2018–2019: Barra da Tijuca (youth)
- 2019–2022: Serrano-RJ U20
- 2019–2022: Serrano-RJ (assistant)
- 2022: Serrano-RJ (interim)
- 2022–2024: Botafogo U20 (assistant)
- 2025: Vitória U20 (assistant)
- 2025–: Santos (women) (assistant)
- 2026: Santos (women) (interim)
- * Club domestic league appearances and goals

Bruno Barbosa da Encarnação (born 13 May 1985), known as Bruno Barbosa, is a Brazilian football coach and former player who played as a striker. He is the current assistant coach of Santos' women's team.

== Playing career ==
Barbosa started his career with Flamengo, and managed to appear with the first team during the 2005 season. He was loaned out to Goytacaz in 2006, before joining Fortaleza also in a temporary deal in December of that year.

Back to Fla in 2007, Barbosa failed to make an appearance and had his contract terminated. After just one appearance with CRAC, he joined KF Partizani Tirana in Albania on a free transfer along with compatriot Roma, a player who had also been without a club for almost a year.

Barbosa subsequently played for Caniçal in Portugal, and would later resume his career in clubs in his native Rio de Janeiro: Miguel Couto, Marinho, Ceres and Duquecaxiense, aside from a short spell at Rio Branco-ES in 2011.

== Coaching career ==
After retiring, Barbosa worked in the youth categories of Barra da Tijuca before joining Serrano-RJ in 2019, as an assistant of the first team and under-20 coach. In September 2022, he was an interim head coach of the latter as Jordy Blanco was unable to be registered due to a work permit.

On 4 October 2022, Barbosa became Thiago de Camillis' assistant at the under-20 team of Botafogo. Roughly one year later, he also worked in the same role in the first team, being the assistant of Lúcio Flávio.

Ahead of the 2025 season, Barbosa moved to Vitória also as an under-20 assistant. On 25 October of that year, he was announced as the assistant coach of Santos' women's team.

In April 2026, Barbosa was also an interim head coach of the Sereias da Vila during a match against Palmeiras, as new head coach Marcelo Frigerio was not registered on time.

== Honours ==
Fortaleza

- Campeonato Cearense: 2007
