= 1973–74 Kategoria e Dytë =

Kategoria e Dytë
- Season: 1973–74
- Champions: Punëtori
- Promoted: Punëtori
- Relegated: Minatori (Rr); 5 Shtatori

The 1973–74 Kategoria e Dytë was the 28th season of a second-tier association football league in Albania.

== Group A ==
Pos	Team	Pld	W	D	L	GF	GA	GD	Pts	Qualification or relegation
1	Apolonia	18	11	3	4	42	20	+22	25	Qualification to the Promotion playoff
2	31 Korriku	18	8	6	4	32	24	+8	22	
3	Tekstilisti Stalin	18	8	4	6	32	19	+13	20	
4	Erzeni	18	8	4	6	22	23	−1	20	
5	Korabi	18	3	12	3	21	25	−4	18	
6	Tërbuni	18	6	5	7	29	31	−2	17	
7	Përparimi	18	7	3	8	27	38	−11	17	
8	10 Korriku	18	6	4	8	31	28	+3	16	
9	Sopoti	18	5	5	8	25	37	−12	15	
10	Minatori (Rr) (R)	18	2	6	10	16	32	−16	10	Relegation to 1974–75 Kategoria e Tretë

(R) Relegated

== Group B ==
Pos	Team	Pld	W	D	L	GF	GA	GD	Pts	Qualification or relegation
1	Punëtori (C, P)	18	10	5	3	28	18	+10	25	Qualification to the Promotion playoff
2	Tomori	18	11	2	5	36	20	+16	24	
3	Dajti	18	8	6	4	25	16	+9	22	
4	Adriatiku Nartë	18	6	6	6	24	22	+2	18	
5	Butrinti	18	6	6	6	23	21	+2	18	
6	22 Tetori	18	5	7	6	18	19	−1	17	
7	Ylli i Kuq	18	5	5	8	23	30	−7	15	
8	Minatori (T)	18	5	4	9	23	32	−9	14	
9	Bistrica	18	4	6	8	23	34	−11	14	
10	5 Shtatori (R)	18	4	5	9	17	28	−11	13	Relegation to 1974–75 Kategoria e Tretë

(C) Champions; (P) Promoted; (R) Relegated

== Championship/promotion playoff ==
Team 1	Score	Team 2
Punëtori	1–0	Apolonia

- Punëtori was promoted to 1974–75 National Championship. Apolonia was placed to the promotion play-offs.

== Promotion/relegation playoff ==
Team 1	Agg.	Team 2	1st leg	2nd leg
Apolonia	0–2	17 Nëntori	0–0	0–2
