= Leandro (footballer, born 1978) =

Brazilian footballer (born 1978)

Personal information
- Full name: Leandro Gil Miranda da Silva
- Date of birth: April 19, 1978 (age 48)
- Place of birth: Rio de Janeiro, Brazil

Senior career*
| Years | Team | Apps | (Gls) |
| 1998–1999 | Bangu | 1 | (0) |
| ?–2004 | Angra dos Reis | | |
| 2005 | Barreira | | |
| 2006 | Vllaznia | | (3) |
| 2006–2007 | KF Partizani Tirana | | |
| 2007 | Duque de Caxias | | |
| 2007–2008 | KS Vllaznia Shkodër | | |
| 2008–2009 | KS Gramozi Ersekë | | |
- * Club domestic league appearances and goals

Leandro Gil Miranda da Silva (born 19 April 1978), known as just Leandro, is a Brazilian former footballer.

Leandro signed a contract with Esporte Clube Barreira from April to July 2005.

Leandro finished as the runner-up of 2005–06 Albanian Cup. He signed a contract with Duque de Caxias in April 2007, last until the end of year. He won 2007–08 Albanian Cup.
