= Zoran Stjepanović =

Serbian footballer

Personal information
- Full name: Zoran Stjepanović
- Date of birth: June 13, 1975 (age 51)
- Place of birth: Belgrade, SFR Yugoslavia
- Height: 1.80 m (5 ft 11 in)
- Position: Midfielder

Senior career*
Years	Team	Apps	(Gls)
1996–1998	Budućnost Valjevo	48	(10)
1998–2001	Spartak Subotica	60	(14)
2001–2002	Alki Larnaca	25	(7)
2002–2005	Omonia	56	(11)
2005–2010	Ethnikos Achnas	92	(29)
Total		281	(71)
- * Club domestic league appearances and goals

Zoran Stjepanović (born June 13, 1975) is a Serbian former football midfielder.

During his career he played for Serbian clubs Budućnost Valjevo and Spartak Subotica before moving to Cyprus to play with Alki Larnaca, Omonia and Ethnikos Achnas.
