= Ermir Strati =

Albanian footballer

Personal information
- Date of birth: 11 November 1983 (age 42)
- Place of birth: Vlorë, Albania
- Positions: Defender; midfielder

Senior career*
Years	Team	Apps	(Gls)
2006–2009	Flamurtari	92	(3)
2009–2011	Vlora	63	(5)
2012	Luftëtari		
2013	Fortuna Oslo FK		

Managerial career
- 2011: Vlora (player/coach)
- 2014–2017: Fortuna Oslo FK
- * Club domestic league appearances and goals

Ermir Strati (born 11 November 1983 in Vlorë) is an Albanian retired football player. He can play as either a defender or midfielder. He currently works at Norwegian club IK Grand Bodø.

== Club career ==
He has played for Flamurtari Vlorë in the Albanian Superliga and KF Vlora. At KF Vlora, he was both football player and the head coach. By 2013, he was playing for the Norwegian amateur club Fortuna FK Oslo where he later became coach and director of sports.

== Honours ==
=== Flamurtari ===
- Kupa e shqipërisë (1): 2008–09
- Kupa Birra Norga (1): 2007
- Kupa Pavarësia (1): 2009
- Kupa Mbarëkombëtare (1): 2009
