= Isidor Sekseni =

Albanian footballer

Personal information
- Full name: Isidor Sekseni
- Date of birth: 19 November 1986 (age 39)
- Place of birth: Mirditë District, Albania
- Position: Midfielder

Team information
- Current team: US Castiglionese 1919

Senior career*
Years	Team	Apps	(Gls)
2007–2008	Skrapari	20	(0)
2008–2009	Lushnja	31	(3)
2009–2010	Shkumbini	31	(2)
2010–2011	Dinamo Tirana	20	(0)
2012	Kastrioti	24	(1)
2013	Shkumbini	13	(1)
2014	Scandicci	11	(0)
2016	Valdarno		
2017-	Castiglionese	14	(1)

International career^{‡}
2003–2005	Albania U-19	3	(0)
- * Club domestic league appearances and goals as of 29 August 2010 ‡ National team caps and goals as of 25 August 2010

Isidor Sekseni (born 19 November 1986) is an Albanian footballer who currently plays as a midfielder for Italian lower league side US Castiglionese 1919. His main position is in the centre of midfield but he can play in more advanced roles as well.

== Club career ==
=== Dinamo Tirana ===
Sekseni signed for the Albanian champions on 28 July 2010. He signed a two-year contract with the club keeping him in Tirana until 2012. He made his debut for Dinamo in a 2–1 win over Besa Kavajë on 28 August 2010. He started the game in the centre of the midfield with Igli Allmuca and played the full 90 minutes.

He later moved to Italy to play in the lower leagues, joining Castiglionese from Valdarno in December 2016.

== Playing style ==
Isidor Sekseni preferred using both his feet. Sometimes, you will be able to see him using his left foot the strike, and other times he will be using his right foot to strike.
