= Roland Nenaj =

Albanian footballer

Personal information
- Full name: Roland Nenaj
- Date of birth: 28 November 1978 (age 47)
- Place of birth: Vlorë, Albania
- Position: Midfielder

Senior career*
Years	Team	Apps	(Gls)
1998–1999	Flamurtari		
2001–2002	Bylis	23	(1)
2002–2006	Flamurtari	36+	(10+)
2007–2008	Elbasani	11	(2)
2008–2009	Bylis	27	(4)
2011–2012	Himara	18	(2)

Managerial career
- 2012–2014: Himara
- 2014–2015: Bylis
- * Club domestic league appearances and goals

Roland Nenaj (born 28 November 1978 in Vlorë) is an Albanian retired professional footballer who was the head coach of Bylis Ballsh.
