= Einar Tróndargjógv =

Faroese footballer

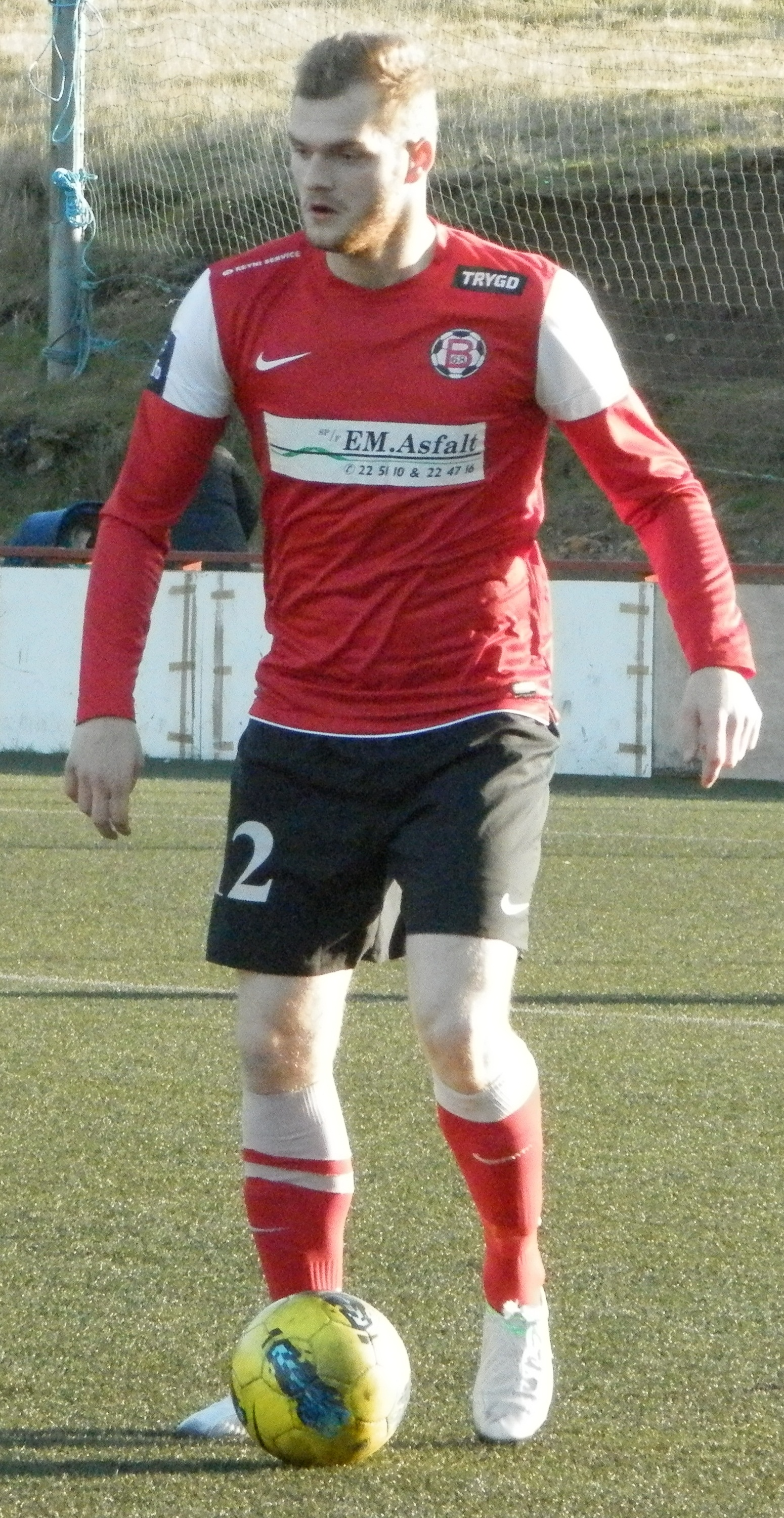

Personal information
- Full name: Einar Tróndargjógv Hansen
- Date of birth: 2 April 1988 (age 38)
- Place of birth: Runavík, Faroe Islands
- Position: Defender

Team information
- Current team: NSÍ Runavík
- Number: 12

Senior career*
Years	Team	Apps	(Gls)
2004–2011	NSÍ Runavík	148	(9)
2012	B68 Toftir	23	(2)
2013–	NSÍ Runavík	60	(4)

International career^{‡}
2007–	Faroe Islands	12	(0)
- * Club domestic league appearances and goals as of 16 June 2015 ‡ National team caps and goals as of 16 June 2015

Einar Tróndargjógv (earlier Einar Tróndargjógv Hansen, born 2 April 1988) is a Faroese footballer who plays as a defender for NSÍ Runavík. He is also a member of Faroe Islands national football team. Earlier he played for B68 Toftir.
