= Rezart Maho =

Albanian footballer and manager

Personal information
- Full name: Rezart Maho
- Date of birth: 8 February 1984 (age 42)
- Place of birth: Tirana, Albania
- Position: Midfielder

Team information
- Current team: FK Vora (manager)

Youth career
- Dinamo Tirana

Senior career*
Years	Team	Apps	(Gls)
2001–2003	Dinamo Tirana	11	(0)
2003–2004	Apolonia		
2004–2005	Egnatia	18	(1)
2005–2006	Pogradeci		
2006–2007	Kastrioti	6	(0)
2007–2008	Dinamo Tirana	0	(0)
2008–2009	Kalamata	20	(1)
2009	Partizani	7	(0)
2009– 2010	Laçi	14	(1)
2010–	Partizani		
2010-2011	Besëlidhja		
2011	Dinamo Tirana		
2012-2015	Kamza		
2016-2017	Adriatiku		

International career
	Albania U-21	1	(0)

Managerial career
- 2016-2017: Adriatiku (player/coach)
- 2019-: Vora
- * Club domestic league appearances and goals as of 19 May 2010

Rezart Maho (born 8 February 1984) is an Albanian retired football player and current manager of FK Vora.

== Career ==
=== Dinamo ===
Rezert started his career with Dinamo Tirana during the 2001–2002 season and, in that time, didn't receive many opportunities to play in the league.

He played in the final of the Albanian Cup in the 2002–2003 season with Dinamo Tirana against Teuta Durrës when he was substituted with January Ziambo in the last five minutes of the match. The match was played on 31 May 2003 and ended with a 1–0 win for Dinamo. Before that he had scored two goals in a 3–0 win for Dinamo against Luftëtari in the first match of the second round of the Albanian Cup.

Afterward, he played with Apolonia Fier, Pogradeci, Egnatia and Kastrioti before returning again to Dinamo Tirana at the start of 2007–2008 season.

=== Kalamata ===
After he couldn't establish himself as a regular starter at Dinamo Tirana Maho left the team after the first half of the season ended to join Kalamata of Beta Ethniki (second division) in Greece. He had some good performances with Kalamata playing regularly in the starting eleven (17 matches, 5 goals).

With the start of the 2008–2009 season a new coach took over at Kalamata and the Albanian midfielder lost his position in the squad. After playing only 3 games as a substitute he returned in Albania and joined Partizani Tiranë.

=== Partizani ===
Maho joined Partizani Tiranë on 28 January 2009. Just four days later he played his first match with "The Red Bulls" against KS Bylis Ballsh coming on during the game as a substitute. The match ended with a 1–0 win for Partizani Tiranë.

Maho has recently become a first team player at Partizani Tiranë.
