= Mario Bytyçi =

Albanian footballer

Personal information
- Date of birth: 22 February 1985 (age 41)
- Place of birth: Tirana, Albania
- Position: Goalkeeper

Youth career
- Shkëndija

Senior career*
Years	Team	Apps	(Gls)
2003–2005	Besa		
2005–2007	Tomori		
2007–2008	Skrapari		(2)
2008–2011	Pogradeci	75	(0)
2011–2013	Kamza	49	(4)
2013–2014	Butrinti	26	(1)
2014–2015	Mamurrasi	22	(1)
2015–2016	Pogradeci	23	(0)
2016–2017	Kamza	1	(0)
2017–2018	Erzeni	11	(0)
2018–2019	Bylis	21	(4)
2019–2022	Burreli	9	(0)
- * Club domestic league appearances and goals

Mario Bytyçi (born 22 February 1985) is an Albanian former professional footballer who last played as a goalkeeper for KF Burreli in the Albanian First Division.

== Goals scored ==
He is known for having scored the most goals by a goalkeeper in Albania, 12 in all: four at FC Kamza, two at KF Skrapari, one each at KF Butrinti and KF Adriatiku Mamurras and four for KF Bylis.

== Honours ==
Pogradeci

- Albanian First Division (1): 2010–11
