= Manuel Alexandre Nana Bikoula =

Cameroonian football player

Personal information
- Date of birth: 17 January 1980 (age 46)
- Place of birth: Yaounde, Cameroon
- Height: 1.80 m (5 ft 11 in)
- Position: Striker

Senior career*
Years	Team	Apps	(Gls)
1999–2000	Shooting Stars of Limbé	8	(2)
2000–2002	Tonnerre Yaoundé	52	(24)
2002–2004	Coton Sport FC de Garoua	36	(17)
2004–2005	Troyes AC, France	20	(4)
2005–2012	KS Besa Kavajë	193	(11)
2012–2014	Thonburi-BG United	66	(31)

International career
2002–2003	Cameroon U20	7	(0)
2003	Cameroon U23	12	(3)
2004–2005	Cameroon	4	(0)
- * Club domestic league appearances and goals

Manuel Alexandre Nana Bikoula (born 17 January 1980) is a Cameroonian football player. He was born in Yaounde.

== Club career ==
- Shooting Stars of Limbe (Cameroon) 1999–2000
- Tonnerre Yaoundé (Cameroon) 2000–2002
- Coton Sport FC de Garoua (Cameroon) 2002–2004
- Troyes AC, (France) 2004–2005
- KS Besa Kavajë (Albania) 2005–2012
- Thonburi-BG United (Thailand) 2012–2014

== Honours ==
- Best player in 2nd Division in Cameroon
- Best scorer in Cameroon 1st Division
- CAF winning runner 2002
- CAF winning runner 2003
