= Bledion Guga =

Albanian footballer and youth coach

Bledjon Guga
Personal information
- Date of birth: 20 February 1986 (age 40)
- Place of birth: Tirana, PSR Albania
- Height: 6 ft 1 in (1.85 m)
- Position: Centre-back

Senior career*
Years	Team	Apps	(Gls)
2003–2010	Flamurtari	140	(4)
2010	Dinamo Tirana	10	(0)
2011	Vlora		
2011–2012	Balzan Youths	27	(0)
2012	Dingli Swallows		
2013	Ħamrun Spartans	13	(0)
2013	Himara	14	(2)
2014	Bylis	6	(0)

International career
2004–2005	Albania U19	8	(0)
2005–2007	Albania U21	12	(0)
- * Club domestic league appearances and goals

Bledjon Guga (born 20 February 1986) is an Albanian football player who plays as a centre-back.

== Club career ==
The central defender moved abroad to play for newly promoted side Balzan Youths in the Maltese Premier League.

== Honours ==
=== Flamurtari ===
- Kupa e shqipërisë (1): 2008–09
- Kupa Birra Norga (1): 2007
- Kupa Pavarësia (1): 2009
- Kupa Mbarëkombëtare (1): 2009
