= Roma (footballer, born 1979) =

Brazilian footballer

Personal information
- Full name: Paulo Marcel Pereira Merabet
- Date of birth: 22 February 1979 (age 47)
- Place of birth: Belém, Brazil
- Height: 1.69 m (5 ft 7 in)
- Position: Forward

Senior career*
Years	Team	Apps	(Gls)
1998	Remo		
1999–2003	Flamengo	29	(3)
1999	→ União Mogi (loan)		
2002–2003	→ Al-Nasr (loan)		
2003	Brasiliense		
2004	Jeonbuk Hyundai	16	(5)
2004–2005	Lokeren	5	(0)
2005	Marília		
2005–2006	UNAM	0	(0)
2006–2007	Belenenses	17	(1)
2008	Santa Cruz		
2008	Boa Esporte		
2008–2009	Partizani	7	(0)
2009	Macaé	0	(0)
2010	São Cristóvão	?	(2)
2010	Águia de Marabá	4	(0)
2011	Salgueiro	0	(0)
2011	Águia de Marabá	0	(0)
2011	Bragantino-PA		
- * Club domestic league appearances and goals

Paulo Marcel Pereira Merabet (born 22 February 1979 in Belém, Pará), commonly known as Roma, is a Brazilian retired footballer who played as a forward.
