= Luan Pinari =

Albanian footballer

Personal information
- Full name: Luan Pinari
- Date of birth: 27 October 1977 (age 49)
- Place of birth: Tirana, Albania
- Height: 1.86 m (6 ft 1 in)
- Position: Defender

Youth career
- Dinamo Tirana

Senior career*
Years	Team	Apps	(Gls)
1994–2003	Dinamo Tirana	186	(12)
2003–2004	Tirana	24	(0)
2004	Dinamo Tirana	11	(0)
2005–2011	Partizani	111	(0)
Total		332	(12)

International career
1996–1999	Albania U-21	10	(1)
1998–2003	Albania	5	(1)
- * Club domestic league appearances and goals

Luan Pinari (born 27 October 1977) is an Albanian former footballer who played for Dinamo Tirana, KF Tirana and Partizani Tirana, becoming one of few players to have been at all three clubs in the Albanian capital. He was also a member of the Albania national team and earned 5 senior international caps.

== International career ==
He made his debut for Albania in an August 1998 friendly match away against Cyprus and earned a total of 5 caps, scoring 1 goal. His final international was a February 2003 friendly win over Vietnam in which he scored Albania's fifth goal.

=== National team statistics ===
Albania national team
Year	Apps	Goals
1998	2	0
1999	2	0
2000	0	0
2001	0	0
2002	0	0
2003	1	1
Total	5	1

== Honours ==
- Albanian Superliga: 2

2002, 2004
