= Marius Ngjela =

Albanian footballer

Personal information
- Full name: Marius Ngjela
- Date of birth: 22 January 1983 (age 43)
- Place of birth: Korçë, Albania
- Height: 1.79 m (5 ft 10 in)
- Position: Forward

Youth career
- –2003: Skënderbeu

Senior career*
Years	Team	Apps	(Gls)
2002–2007	Skënderbeu		(17)
2004–2005	→ Pogradeci (loan)		(2)
2008	Besëlidhja	15	(2)
2008–2009	Partizani	27	(10)
2009	Flamurtari	6	(0)
2010	Gramozi	13	(1)
2010	Besa	13	(0)
2011	Kamza	4	(1)
2011–2012	Butrinti	23	(4)
2012–2016	Bilisht		
- * Club domestic league appearances and goals

Marius Ngjela (born 22 January 1983) is an Albanian former professional footballer who played as a forward for a number of Albanian football clubs including Skënderbeu and Partizani.

== Honours ==
=== Clubs ===
Besa

- Albanian Supercup (1): 2010
