= KF Çakrani =

Albanian football club

- Full name: Klubi i Futbollit Çakrani
- Founded: 1991; 34 years ago
- Dissolved: 2014
- Ground: Fusha Sportive Çakran
- Capacity: 1,000

Klubi Futbollistik Çakrani was an Albanian football club based in the small town of Cakran. Çakrani is currently not competing in the senior football league.
