= KF Pojani =

Albanian football club

- Full name: Klubi i Futbollit Pojani
- Founded: 1940
- Ground: Fusha Sportive Pojan
- League: Sunday League Korçë
- 2022–23: 3rd

KF Pojani is an Albanian football club based in the small town of Pojan in the municipality of Maliq. They are currently competing in the Sunday League of Korçë.
