= KF Çlirimi =

Albanian football club

- Full name: Klubi i Futbollit Çlirimi
- Founded: 1988
- Ground: Fusha Sportive e Shkollës Bujqësore
- Capacity: 2000

KF Çlirimi is an Albanian football club based in Fier, Albania. The club is currently not competing in the senior football league.
