= Nevian Cani =

Albanian footballer

Personal information
- Date of birth: 25 February 1986 (age 40)
- Place of birth: Shkodër, Albania
- Height: 1.85 m (6 ft 1 in)
- Position: Forward

Youth career
- Vllaznia

Senior career*
Years	Team	Apps	(Gls)
2004–2009	Vllaznia	70	(35)
2006	→ Shkumbini (loan)	9	(6)
2007–2008	→ Flamurtari (loan)	20	(14)
2009	Besëlidhja	5	(3)
2010	Ada Velipojë	10	(12)

International career
	Albania U17	5	(5)
	Albania U19	7	(6)
	Albania U21	8	(7)
- * Club domestic league appearances and goals

Nevian Cani (born 25 February 1986) is an Albanian former professional footballer who played as a forward for Vllaznia Shkodër, Shkumbini Peqin, Flamurtari Vlorë, Besëlidhja Lezhë and Ada Velipojë.
