= Fatjon Tafaj =

Albanian footballer and coach

Personal information
- Full name: Fatjon Tafaj
- Date of birth: 19 March 1982 (age 44)
- Place of birth: Tirana, PSR Albania
- Height: 1.83 m (6 ft 0 in)
- Position: Centre-back

Team information
- Current team: Albania U17

Youth career
- 1999–2001: Partizani Tirana

Senior career*
| Years | Team | Apps | (Gls) |
| 2000–2004 | Partizani | 16 | (0) |
| 2001–2002 | → Elbasani (loan) | | |
| 2003–2004 | → Lushnja (loan) | | |
| 2004–2006 | Shkumbini | 64 | (1) |
| 2006–2009 | Partizani | 74 | (1) |
| 2009–2013 | Kamza | 59 | (1) |
| 2010–2011 | → Laçi (loan) | 0 | (0) |
| 2013 | Partizani | 13 | (0) |
| 2013 | Dinamo Tirana | 8 | (0) |
| 2014 | Kamza | 16 | (0) |
| Total | | 250+ | (3+) |

International career
| 2000 | Albania U18 | 3 | (0) |
| 2002 | Albania U21 | 1 | (0) |

Managerial career
- 2016–2019: Kukësi (co-assistant)
- 2019–2021: Shkëndija (co-assistant)
- 2022–2023: Partizani (co-assistant)
- 2023–2025: Dinamo City (co-assistant)
- 2025: Kukësi
- 2025–: Albania U17
- * Club domestic league appearances and goals as of 9 November 2019

Fatjon Tafaj (born 19 March 1982) is an Albanian football coach and former player, who is currently the head coach of Albania U17.

== Club career ==
In December 2012, Tafaj agreed personal terms and made a second return at his boyhood club Partizani Tirana, now in Albanian First Division, by signing until the end of the season. He started the second part of 2012–13 season by playing full-90 minutes in a 2–1 win at Butrinti Sarandë.

On 13 August 2013, Tafaj joined fellow capital side Dinamo Tirana on a one-year contract. He made his official debut later that month by starting in the 3–2 away loss to Veleçiku Koplik in the opening week of 2013–14 Albanian First Division.

In January 2014, Tafaj returned to Kamza as a player-coach.

== International career ==
Tafaj has been a former member of Albania youth side, playing three matches for under-18 squad in 2000 and one match for under-21 in 2002.

== Managerial career ==
On 31 July 2016, Tafaj was named as assistant coach of Ernest Gjoka at Kukësi.
