= Ardit Beqiri =

Albanian footballer

Personal information
- Full name: Ardit Beqiri
- Date of birth: 13 February 1979 (age 47)
- Place of birth: Tirana, Albania
- Height: 1.81 m (5 ft 11 in)
- Position: Midfielder

Senior career*
Years	Team	Apps	(Gls)
1999–2004	Partizani	100	(0)
2004–2005	Tirana	17	(0)
2005–2008	Partizani	86	(2)
2008–2009	Elbasani	18	(0)
2009–2010	Vllaznia	11	(0)
2010–2011	Partizani	25	(2)
2011–2013	Kamza		

International career^{‡}
2002–2006	Albania	12	(0)

Managerial career
- 2013–2014: Kamza
- * Club domestic league appearances and goals as of 14 January 2015 ‡ National team caps and goals as of 14 January 2015

Ardit Beqiri (born 13 February 1979) is an Albanian retired footballer.

== Club career ==
He played the majority of his career as a defender or midfielder for Partizani and retired at FC Kamza.

== International career ==
He made his debut for Albania in a January 2002 friendly match against Macedonia and earned a total of 12 caps, scoring no goals. His final international was a March 2006 friendly match against Georgia.
