= Dritan Babamusta =

Albanian former footballer

Personal information
- Full name: Dritan Babamusta
- Date of birth: 6 September 1981 (age 45)
- Place of birth: Durrës, PSR Albania
- Height: 1.90 m (6 ft 3 in)
- Position: Midfielder

Youth career
- Teuta Durrës

Senior career*
Years	Team	Apps	(Gls)
1997–2005	Teuta Durrës	168	(16)
2005–2006	Dinamo Tirana	17	(2)
2006–2009	Partizani Tirana	74	(7)
2009–2010	Besa Kavajë	15	(2)

International career^{‡}
2001–2002	Albania U21	7	(0)
2002	Albania	1	(0)
- * Club domestic league appearances and goals as of 31 January 2010 ‡ National team caps and goals as of 13 March 2002

Dritan Babamusta (born 6 September 1981) is an Albanian former footballer who played as a midfielder.

He has been capped once for Albania.

== Club career ==
On 5 August 2006, Babamusta was released by Dinamo Tirana in a move which was dubbed a surprise by Albanian media.

Babamusta announced his retirement from football on 16 September 2012 after more than two years without playing. A small ceremony was held in his honor before the start of the league match against Tirana.

== International career ==
Babamusta earned his first and last international cap 13 March 2002 by starting in the 4–0 loss to Mexico.

== Honors ==
Besa Kavajë

- Albanian Cup: 2009–10
