= Elis Bakaj =

Albanian footballer (born 1987)

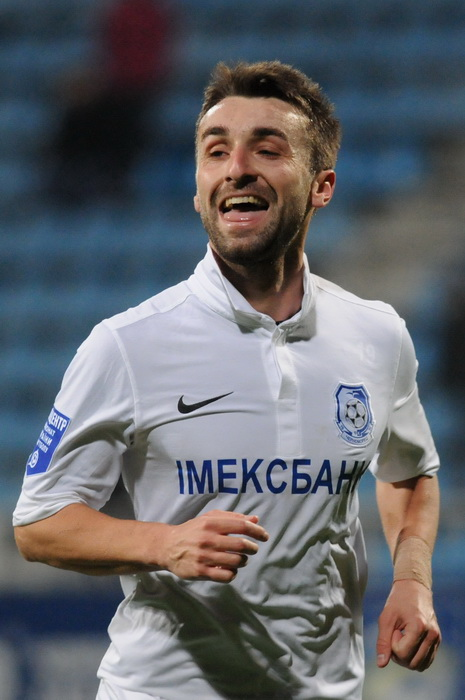

Personal information
- Full name: Elis Flamur Bakaj
- Date of birth: 25 June 1987 (age 39)
- Place of birth: Tirana, Albania
- Height: 1.75 m (5 ft 9 in)
- Position: Attacking midfielder

Youth career
- 1996: KF Kristali
- 1997–2002: Partizani Tirana

Senior career*
Years	Team	Apps	(Gls)
2002–2009	Partizani Tirana	136	(23)
2009–2011	Dinamo Tirana	58	(30)
2011–2012	Dinamo București	27	(5)
2012–2014	Chornomorets Odesa	33	(9)
2014–2015	Tirana	27	(13)
2015	Hapoel Ra'anana	1	(0)
2015–2016	Tirana	27	(14)
2016	RNK Split	10	(1)
2017	Vllaznia Shkodër	14	(6)
2017–2018	Kukësi	20	(12)
2018–2019	Shakhtyor Soligorsk	49	(19)
2020	Dinamo Brest	4	(0)
2021	Rukh Brest	15	(2)

International career
2005	Albania U19	3	(0)
2005–2007	Albania U21	8	(2)
2008–2013	Albania	27	(1)
- * Club domestic league appearances and goals as of 31 December 2021

Elis Flamur Bakaj (born 25 June 1987) is an Albanian former professional footballer who played as an attacking midfielder or a forward.

Bakaj began his career as a youth player for KF Kristali, before moving to Partizani Tirana. In 2002, he started his professional career with Partizani, playing until 2009 before moving to rivals of Dinamo Tirana. After playing with them for two years, he moved outside of Albania and signed with the Romanian club Dinamo București. After one season with White and Reds, he moved in Ukraine and signed with Chornomorets Odesa. Due to the civil unrest caused by the 2014 Ukrainian revolution, Bakaj returned to Albania and signed with KF Tirana, his third club inside of Tirana.

An international footballer for Albania since 2008, Bakaj has earned over 25 caps for his country. He debuted in 2008 and scored his first goal with Red and Blacks four years later.

== Club career ==
=== Early career ===
Born in Tirana, Bakaj joined his first club KF Kristali in May 1996 at the age of eight, where he would only remain until October. Despite only playing for the club for less than six months, he still managed to be named the player of the year in the youth league.

For the next six months, Elis was trained personally by former Albanian international and Dinamo Tirana player Andrea Marko. In June 1997 he joined Partizani Tirana under the guidance of coach Gazmend Kraja, where he worked his way up the ranks of the club. He amazed the club, including its president Albert Xhani, who in January 2002 sent Bakaj into the club's senior side.

=== Partizani Tirana ===
He joined Partizani's first team at the age of 15 in January 2002 on a seven-year contract with a minimal wage of just 150,000 Lekë a season. His official Partizani debut came in the 2003 Intertoto Cup against Israeli side Maccabi Netanya, where coach Perlat Musta played Bakaj in the final seven minutes of the game.

In September 2003, Partizani's new coach Ilir Spahiu sent Bakaj on loan to FC Nacionali, a Partizani feeder team playing in the Albanian Second Division. The Nacionali coach Genci Tomorri gave Bakaj the opportunity of regular first team football, allowing the youngster to show his talent and score goals. In January 2004 his loan was ended and he returned to Partizani where the previous coach Spahiu had left and Sulejman Mema had now taken charge.

Bakaj scored his maiden Partizani goal on 1 October 2003 in an Albanian Cup match against Fushë Mbreti, netting the fourth in an eventual 6–0 win in the second leg of second round. He made his first ever Albanian Superliga appearance later on 22 February of the following year as a substitute in the 1–2 away defeat to Teuta Durrës. Bakaj's scored again in cup on 24 March 2004 in the quarter-finals against Elbasani; netting the winning goal in the 74th minute to send his side through to the semi-finals. Partizani eventually reached the final when they beat Dinamo 0–1, in a match where Bakaj was an unused substitute. This win constituted his first senior trophy.

=== Dinamo Tirana ===
On 8 January 2009, Bakaj completed a move to Dinamo Tirana for €100,000, becoming the most expensive player in the club's history. He was presented one day later, where he signed a three-year contract, and was given the squad number 19 for the second part of the 2008–09 season.

Following his performances with Dinamo Tirana throughout the 2009–10 season, Bakaj was named Albanian Footballer of the Year for the second consecutive year, becoming the first player to win it twice.

=== Dinamo București ===
In January 2011, in the last hours before the expiration of the winter transfer window, Bakaj moved to Dinamo București. He signed a contract for five years with the Romanian team. The Albanian squad accepted the offer of €200,000 because he entered the final six months of his contract. He was recommended to Dinamo București by their former glory, the Albanian star Sulejman Demollari, who played for the Bucharest team between 1991 and 1995 and scored 36 goals in 100 games.

Bakaj made his debut for Dinamo on 26 February 2011, when he played in the last 17 minutes in a Liga I game against Sportul Studenţesc. He opened his scoring account later on 12 April, scoring the third and final goal of the 3–1 home win against Unirea Urziceni.

During the 2011 Cupa României Final Bakaj had a firecracker thrown at him by a Steaua București fan, which he managed to dodge.

=== Chornomorets Odesa ===
On 27 February 2012, he joined Ukrainian club Chornomorets Odesa on loan. He then signed a permanent contract for Chornomorets Odesa outright on a three-year contract in May.

=== Kukësi ===
Due to the civil unrest caused by the 2014 Ukrainian revolution, Bakaj agreed to be released from his contract with Chornomorets Odesa as he looked for a return to Albania. He was reportedly close to signing with his first club Partizani Tirana, but a deal was not agreed to, so he joined Kukësi on 12 March 2014, pending FIFA clearance. He signed a contract until the end of the 2013–14 season, as well as any European games the club would be involved in, should they qualify. His wage was reported to be €40,000, making him one of the highest paid players in the league's history. However, FIFA did not give him the permit to play, so Bakaj terminated the contract and left the club only two weeks following his arrival.

=== Skënderbeu Korçë ===
After his departure from Kukësi, Bakaj joined fellow Albanian Superliga side Skënderbeu Korçë on 9 June 2014 for the club's European campaign. However, he was released by the club after only one month.

=== Tirana ===
Without playing a single minute for Skënderbeu Korçë, Bakaj signed for Tirana on 19 July 2014, a one-year contract, where he was considered as a reinforcement for the club managed by Gugash Magani. He was assigned the vacant number 19 for the upcoming 2014–15 season.

Bakaj made his competitive debut on 24 August 2014, a debut which brought his first goal as well. He played as a starter in the opening match of the 2014–15 season against Apolonia Fier and scored the opening goal in the 24th minute of the match which finished in the 3–0 victory. In the second match of the season against Flamurtari Vlorë, he delivered the cross that forced goalkeeper Ilion Lika to make a mistake which resulted in an own goal, helping Tirana to prevail 1–0 at Qemal Stafa Stadium.

In the matchday 4 against the newcomers of Elbasani, Bakaj was sent off in the 91st minute after he insulted the referee Klajdi Kola, resulting in a two-match ban for him. On 18 October, he scored his first goal for the club, a spectacular overhead kick in a 3–1 win against Kukësi at Qemal Stafa Stadium, helping the club to take the league lead temporarily. Later in October, Bakaj scored the only goal of his team against Sopoti Librazhd in the second leg of the Albanian Cup's second round, securing a 4–1 aggregate victory and progression to the quarter-finals. He was the Albanian Superliga Player of the Month for October 2015 after playing four matches and scoring three goals.

On 23 November, in the matchday 13 against Elbasani, Bakaj made a splendid performance by first providing the Gentian Muça's goal from a set-piece and also scoring a set-piece himself as Tirana bounced back to win the match 3–2 in the very last moments. In the last match of 2015, Bakaj netted twice against Teuta Durrës in an eventual 4–2 home success.

He started the new year by providing the Ndikumana's winner against Flamurtari Vlorë on 30 January, and scored a winner himself against Vllaznia Shkodër in the last moments of the match. On 18 April, Bakaj scored his tenth league goal of the season in a 3–1 away success against Elbasani. In the last derby of the season against Partizani Tirana on 4 May, Bakaj scored a brace in a 2–2 draw as Tirana lost further ground in the title race.

On 11 May, it was reported that Bakaj would leave Tirana at the end of the season to sign with the Israeli side Hapoel Ra'anana. In the last match of the season, he scored the winner as Tirana won at home against Teuta Durrës to end the season with honour, despite failing to win the title and to qualify in the European competitions. Bakaj finished the season as the team's top goal scorer with 15 goals between league and cup in 32 appearances.

=== Hapoel Ra'anana ===
Bakaj signed a three-year contract with Israelian club Hapoel Ra'anana and was allocated squad number 80. He made his competitive debut with the club on 1 August in the goalless draw against Maccabi Netanya for the 2015–16 Toto Cup Al, playing for 62 minutes. He netted his first goal eight days later in a 1–1 home draw against Hapoel Be'er Sheva, another match valid for Toto Cup Al. Later, on 22 August, Bakaj debuted in Israeli Premier League by playing 61 minutes in a 2–2 home draw against Hapoel Kfar Saba, which would be his last league appearance for the club. However, Bakaj suddenly terminated his contract with the club and become a free agent. The main reason for this, according to the Israeli media, was his fiancée, who wanted to return to Albania.

=== Return to Tirana ===
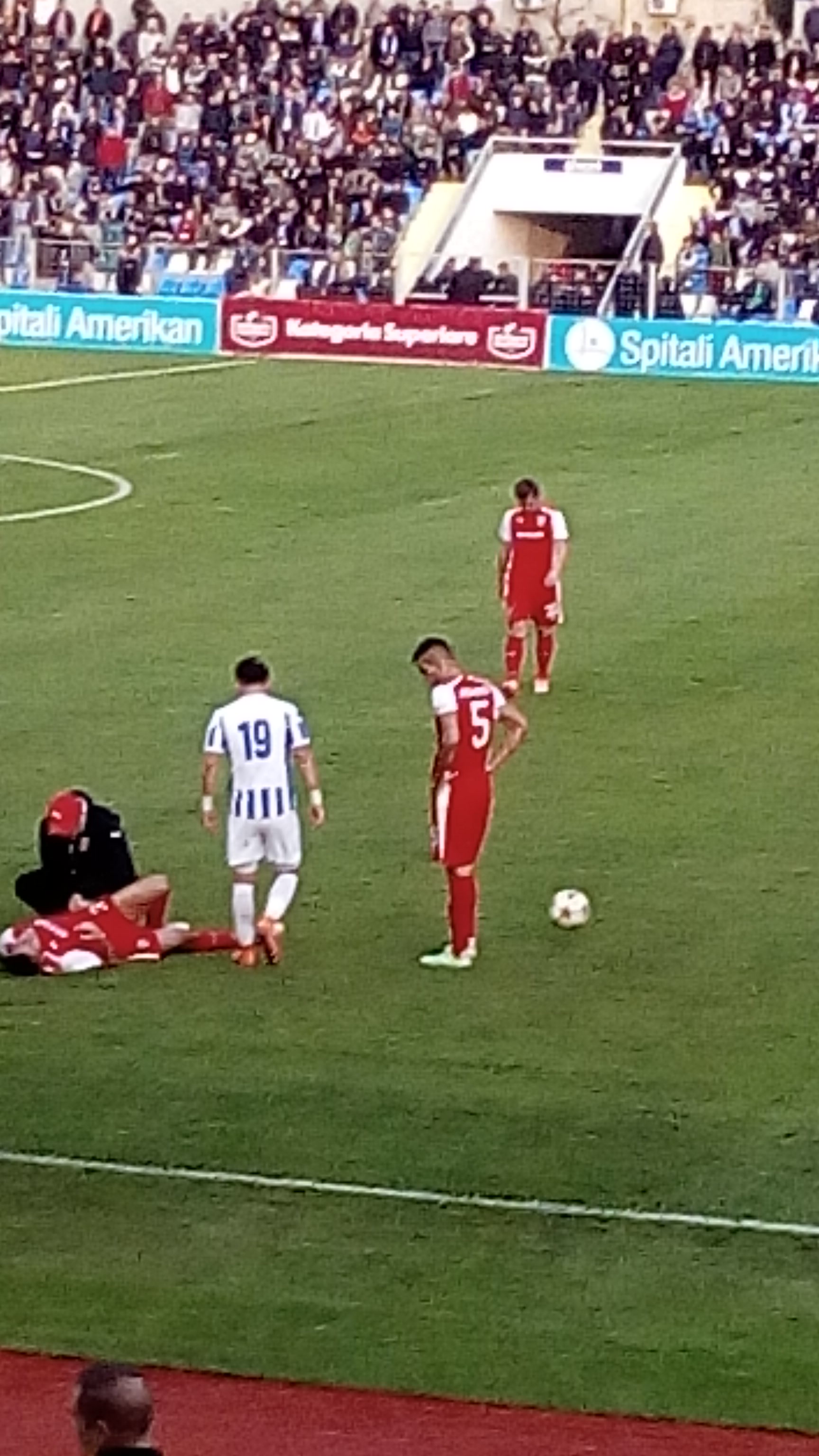
Bakaj during a league match versus Skënderbeu Korçë.

After only three months in Israel, on 29 August, Bakaj returned to Tirana by signing a one-year contract with an option of a further one, taking his squad number 19. He was presented to the media one day later. He made his return debut on 12 September in the matchday 3 against Bylis Ballsh which ended in a goalless draw at home. He scored his first goal of the season in returning leg of 2015–16 Albanian Cup's first round against Erzeni Shijak, which ended in a 2–0, securing a 3–0 aggregate victory and progression to the second round.

Bakaj scored his first league goal on 7 November against the newcomers of Tërbuni Pukë which ended in a 3–0 home win, enduring a 581-minute scoreless run. Two weeks later, he scored a spectacular volley against Bylis Ballsh, just like "van Basten goal" in the UEFA Euro 1988 Final against Soviet Union, giving his team a 1–0 away win. On 30 November, in the first match at the newly renovated Selman Stërmasi Stadium, Bakaj scored the only goal of his team in a 2–1 defeat to Skënderbeu Korçë. He scored his brace of the season on 13 December in the 2–0 away win to Flamurtari Vlorë, taking his tally up to 5 goals. He started the new year by scoring in the team's 3–1 away win against Tërbuni Pukë. He was named the Albanian Superliga Player of the Month for January 2016, becoming the third player to win the award twice.

One week later, Bakaj scored a sublime free-kick in the 3–0 away win against Laçi, giving Tirana its first win at Laçi Stadium since 5 May 2012 where Tirana won thanks to a winner of Bekim Balaj. However, he was booked during the meaning that he would miss the following league match against Bylis Ballsh at home. On 4 March 2016, he got sent off after receiving two yellow cards after insulting the referee Lorenc Jemini in the 2–0 derby defeat against Partizani Tirana despite being on the pitch for less than 10 minutes after coming on at half time. For his behaviour, Bakaj was banned for four league matches by the Disciplinary Committee of AFA.

Bakaj scored his first league hat-trick in a 3–0 home win against Tërbuni Pukë, returning Tirana in the winning ways after six consecutive league matches without a win. Bakaj become the first player to score a hat-trick for Tirana since Bekim Balaj on 23 October 2011. He followed that by scoring the winner against Laçi to keep the European chances alive.

Bakaj begun May by scoring in the 2–2 home draw against Partizani Tirana in the "Tirana derby". In the last match at home, he scored the winner Vllaznia Shkodër, which was his 13th league strike, equaling his previous season. On final day of the season, he scored the lone goal of his team in a 2–1 away defeat to Kukësi. He ended his second season with Tirana by scoring 15 goals, including 14 in league, being the top goalscorer of the team for the second consecutive season.

=== RNK Split ===
On 9 June 2016, he signed a two-year contract for the Croatian Prva HNL team RNK Split, following in the footsteps of Sokol Cikalleshi and Amir Rrahmani. Upon signing, Bakaj said, "I'm very happy for the signing, I know Split very well, thanks to Rrahmani and i hope to reward the trust on me. I don't want to disappoint the club directors and I'll try to reward them with my goals. Bakaj made his debut on 16 July in the matchday 1 against HNK Rijeka, playing full-90 minutes in a 3–0 home defeat. He scored his first goal of campaign later on 12 August against HNK Cibalia, scoring via a free kick in an eventual 2–2 home draw. Bakaj left the club on 14 November after claiming that was not paid during his five months at the club, sending the issue to FIFA, ending his RNK Split career with only 10 appearances and one goal, becoming a free agent in the process.

=== Blocked move to Tirana and Vllaznia Shkodër ===
After leaving RNK Split in November 2016, Bakaj returned in Albania and begun training with Tirana in order to maintain his form. He said in an interview that his intentions were to play outside, but if not he would play in Albania only with Tirana. He continued to train with Tirana in January, and on 26th, he reached an argument with the club for a contract until the end of 2016–17 season. However, a day later, FIFA blocked the transfer due to Tirana's unpaid debts, forcing the club not to transfer any player during January transfer window, leaving Bakaj still without a team.

Then Bakaj joined fellow Albanian Superliga club Vllaznia Shkodër on a four-month contract, with a reported salary of €20,000. He was presented on 29 January, where he made his first training session with the team, stating that he "would give his best to help the club reach its goals." Bakaj made his competitive debut on 1 February in the first leg of 2016–17 Albanian Cup quarter-final against Teuta Durrës, playing for 82 minutes and receiving positive reviews from the fans as Vllaznia won 1–0. During the match, he was involved in a brawl with Teuta's Bruno Dita, which continued even after the end of the match. Then Bakaj made his league debut four days later against Partizani Tirana at Selman Stërmasi Stadium, opening the score with a first-half volley in an eventual 2–1 defeat.

Later on his second league appearance against Flamurtari Vlorë, Bakaj was on the scoresheet again, netting a 90th-minute goal which was equalizer two minutes later, but nevertheless, Vllaznia won by scoring in the last seconds of added time. One month later, Bakaj scored the lone goal via penalty kick in the match against Laçi to give the team three important points in the race for a spot in Europa League next season. In the matchday 32 against Skënderbeu in Korçë, Bakaj came off the bench and scored his team 3rd goal (his 5th of the season) to put the visitors ahead, but the home team bounced back and scored 2 goals in added time to win 4–3. The match was heavily contested and was considered as fixed by Federbet, the anti match fixing organisation.

On 23 May, Bakaj stated that he was not going to play final matchday against his former side Tirana, as he felt "powerless" to play against Tirana, who risked relegation along with Vllaznia. He asked coach Armando Cungu not to call him up for this match, which would decide which team is going to stay in top flight next season. Cungu, however, didn't fulfill his request, answering that he was going to play, but Bakaj refused categorically. On the same day, he was released by the club, only seven days from his contract expiration. He finished his Vllaznia Shkodër career by making 13 league appearances, in addition two cup matches, scoring six goals in the process, being the joint top goalscorer of the team along with captain Ndriçim Shtubina.

=== Kukësi return ===
On 9 August 2017, Bakaj completed a transfer to reigning Albanian Superliga champions Kukësi as a free transfer. He was presented on the same day, where he penned a one-year contract worth €70,000 a season. In addition, Bakaj would also earn €2,000 bonus for each goal scored and €500 for every assist provided in competitive matches. He made his debut later on 6 September 2017 in the 2017 Albanian Supercup against his former side Tirana which ended in a 0–1 defeat. His league debut occurred three days later in the opening match of championship against newbie Kamza, netting the winner via e penalty kick.

He scored his first brace of the season on 21 October in a controversial fashion in the 3–0 win at Luftëtari Gjirokastër; the first goal was scored in 19th minute with a shot outside the box after everyone stopped playing after a whistle, thinking it was offisde; the whistle came from the stands and match referee ordered players to resume playing and Bakaj profited from that to score. Following the match, Luftëtari manager Hasan Lika called Bakaj a player who do not respect fair play. Bakaj defended himself by stating that referee told him to resume the game, adding that the goal was a "striker instinct". He finished the first phase of season 10 goals in 14 league appearances.

Later on 19 February of the following year, during the league encounter against Partizani Tirana, Bakaj was sent-off in the last moments after insulting some fans in the tribune. Bakaj defended himself afterwards, saying that the insults were against two-three persons, and also added that he "will not allow anyone to touch my family". He was banned for the following two league matches by Albanian Football Association. Bakaj finished his Kukësi career by making 25 appearances in total, including 20 in league, netting 12 goals, all of them in league.

=== Shakhtyor Soligorsk ===
On 4 March 2018, Bakaj completed a transfer to Belarusian Premier League outfit Shakhtyor Soligorsk for €120,000. The transfer was made official five days later, with the player signing a contract until the end of the year. During the presentation, Bakaj stated that he had studied the championship and club before coming, and also added that everything here is super. Bakaj took his usual squad number 19, and made his debut for the club on 31 March in the goalless draw versus Dynamo Brest. He quickly become a regular starter in the team, providing several assists in his first weeks in the club, becoming a fan favourite in the process.

He opened his scoring account later on 12 July 2018 in the first leg of 2018–19 UEFA Europa League first qualifying round versus Wales's Connah's Quay Nomads to give his side a 3–1 away win. It was his first European goal in 12 years and his second overall. Bakaj was on the score-sheet in the second leg as well by netting a penalty as Shakhtyor won 5–1 on aggregate. He scored his first league goal on 16 July in the 2–0 home win against Dynamo Brest, which was followed by another Europa League goal, this time against Lech Poznań in a 1–1 home draw; this meant Bakaj has scored in three consecutive Europa League games for the first time in career.

On 5 November 2018, Bakaj's performances were rewarded as he was given a contract for the next season by the club.

== International career ==
=== Youth ===
Bakaj was part of Albania under-21 team in their qualifying campaign of 2009 UEFA European Under-21 Championship, where Albania was placed in Group 1. He played as a starter in team's first encounter against Italy on 1 June 2007, which finished in a 4–0 away defeat. In the second match five days later, Bakaj was decisive for his team, scoring a winner via penalty kick to give his team a win against Faroe Islands. In the matchday 4 against Azerbaijan on 17 October 2007, Bakaj was sent off for a second bookable offence, giving Azerbaijan a man advantage. However, Albania was able to grab a 1–1 draw at Ismat Gayibov Stadium, in Baku.

=== Senior ===
Bakaj made his senior debut for Albania on 21 November 2007 against Romania in the final UEFA Euro 2008 qualifying match, replacing fellow striker Erjon Bogdani in the 83rd minute.

He scored his first senior international goal against Qatar on 22 May 2012 at Campo de Fútbol de Vallecas, Madrid, Spain.

== Personal life ==
He is the cousin of Edvan Bakaj who plays as a goalkeeper for Kosovar club Drita. They were also teammates at Partizani and Tirana. In June 2018, he married his Romanian girlfriend Andreea, whom he meet during his time at Dinamo București.

== Career statistics ==
=== Club ===
As of 20 November 2021

Appearances and goals by club, season and competition
Club	Season	League			Cup		Europe		Other		Total	
Club	Season	Division	Apps	Goals	Apps	Goals	Apps	Goals	Apps	Goals	Apps	Goals
Partizani Tirana	2003–04	Albanian Superliga	8	0	4	2	1 (Note: Appearance(s) in UEFA Intertoto Cup)	0	—		13	2
Partizani Tirana	2004–05	Albanian Superliga	32	1	0	0	2 (Note: Appearance(s) in UEFA Cup)	0	1 (Note: Appearance in Albanian Supercup)	0	35	1
Partizani Tirana	2005–06	Albanian Superliga	26	3	6	2	0	0	—		32	5
Partizani Tirana	2006–07	Albanian Superliga	29	5	8	3	2	1	—		39	9
Partizani Tirana	2007–08	Albanian Superliga	29	12	1	1	—		—		30	13
Partizani Tirana	2008–09	Albanian Superliga	12	2	2	1	2	0	—		16	3
Partizani Tirana	Total		136	23	21	9	7	1	1	0	165	31
Dinamo Tirana	2008–09	Albanian Superliga	13	4	1	0	—		—		14	4
Dinamo Tirana	2009–10	Albanian Superliga	29	15	3	1	2 (Note: Appearance(s) in UEFA Europa League)	0	—		34	16
Dinamo Tirana	2010–11	Albanian Superliga	16	11	1	3	1 (Note: Appearance(s) in UEFA Champions League)	0	1	1	19	15
Dinamo Tirana	Total		58	30	5	4	3	0	1	1	67	35
Dinamo București	2010–11	Liga I	16	4	3	0	—		—		19	4
Dinamo București	2011–12	Liga I	11	1	2	0	1	0	—		14	1
Dinamo București	Total		27	5	5	0	1	0	—		33	5
Chornomorets Odesa	2011–12	Ukrainian Premier League	10	3	1	1	—		—		11	4
Chornomorets Odesa	2012–13	Ukrainian Premier League	19	5	2	1	—		—		21	6
Chornomorets Odesa	2013–14	Ukrainian Premier League	4	1	1	1	3	0	1 (Note: Appearance in Ukrainian Super Cup)	0	9	2
Chornomorets Odesa	Total		33	9	4	3	3	0	1	0	41	12
Tirana	2014–15	Albanian Superliga	27	13	5	2	—		—		32	15
Hapoel Ra'anana	2015–16	Israeli Premier League	1	0	4 (Note: Appearance(s) in Toto Cup Al)	1	—		—		5	1
Tirana	2015–16	Albanian Superliga	27	14	3	1	—		—		30	15
RNK Split	2016–17	Prva HNL	10	1	0	0	—		—		10	1
Vllaznia Shkodër	2016–17	Albanian Superliga	14	6	2	0	—		—		16	6
Kukësi	2017–18	Albanian Superliga	20	12	4	0	—		1	0	25	12
Shakhtyor Soligorsk	2018	Belarusian Premier League	27	9	1	0	4	3	—		32	12
Shakhtyor Soligorsk	2019	Belarusian Premier League	22	10	3	4	6	1	—		31	15
Shakhtyor Soligorsk	Total		49	19	4	4	10	4	—		63	27
Dynamo Brest	2020	Belarusian Premier League	4	0	2	0	—		1 (Note: Appearance in Belarusian Super Cup)	0	7	0
Rukh Brest	2021	Belarusian Premier League	15	2	2	1	—		—		17	3
Career total			421	134	61	25	24	5	5	1	511	165

=== International ===
As of 6 February 2013

Appearances and goals by national team and year
National team	Year	Apps	Goals
Albania	2007	1	0
Albania	2008	1	0
Albania	2009	3	0
Albania	2010	6	0
Albania	2011	10	0
Albania	2012	5	1
Albania	2013	1	0
Total		27	1

As of match played 6 February 2013. Albania score listed first, score column indicates score after each Bakaj goal.

International goals by date, venue, cap, opponent, score, result and competition
No.	Date	Venue	Cap	Opponent	Score	Result	Competition
1	22 May 2012	Campo de Fútbol de Vallecas, Madrid, Spain	23	Qatar	1–0	2–1	Friendly

== Honours ==
Partizani Tirana

- Albanian Cup: 2003–04
- Albanian Supercup: 2004

Dinamo Tirana

- Albanian Superliga: 2009–10

Shakhtyor Soligorsk

- Belarusian Cup: 2018–19

Dynamo Brest

- Belarusian Super Cup: 2020

Individual

- Albanian Footballer of the Year: 2009, 2010
- Dinamo Tirana Player of the Season: 2009–10
- Dinamo Tirana Goal of the Season: 2009–10, 2010–11
- Albanian Superliga Player of the Month: October 2014, January 2016
