= KF Poliçani =

Albanian football club

- Full name: Klubi i Futbolli Poliçani
- Founded: 1950s
- Ground: Fusha Sportive Poliçan

KF Poliçani is an Albanian football club based in the small town of Poliçan. KF Poliçani is currently not competing in any senior football league.

== History ==
The club was formed in the 1950s, when it was called 22 Tetori until the fall of communism in 1991. The club was then called KF Poliçani. Poliçani's rivals are Skrapari.

== Honours ==
- Albanian Second Division Title – 1968
