= Viktor Gjyla =

Albanian footballer

Personal information
- Date of birth: 11 May 1982 (age 44)
- Place of birth: Lushnjë, Albania
- Height: 1.73 m (5 ft 8 in)
- Position: Defender

Team information
- Current team: Shkumbini
- Number: 11

Youth career
- –2000: KS Lushnja

Senior career*
Years	Team	Apps	(Gls)
2000–2005	Egnatia	34+	(0+)
2005–2006	Lushnja	31	(2)
2006–2009	Partizani	88	(7)
2009–2011	Shkumbini	62	(4)
2011–2012	Tomori	32	(0)
2013–2015	Lushnja	66	(1)
2015	Tomori	10	(1)
2016–2018	Egnatia		
2018–2019	Shkumbini		
2019–2020	Albpetrol		
2020–	Tepelena		
- * Club domestic league appearances and goals

Viktor Gjyla (born 11 May 1982) is an Albanian footballer who currently plays as a defender for Tepelena in the Albanian Third Division.

== Career ==
In 2020, he joined Tepelena in the Kategoria e Tretë.
