= Flamurtari Stadium =

Multi-use stadium in Vlorë, Albania

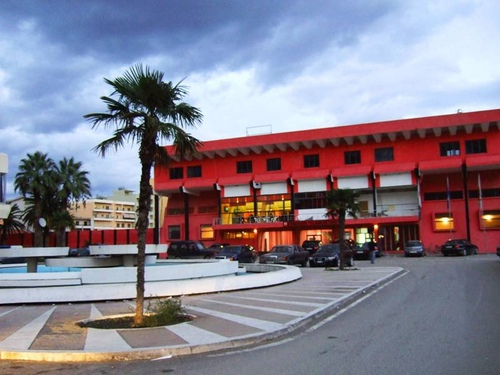
- Interactive map of Flamurtari Stadium
- Location: Lagja Pavaresisë; Vlorë, Albania
- Coordinates: 40°27′21.32″N 19°29′20.35″E
- Owner: Flamurtari Vlorë
- Capacity: 9,500
- Surface: Grass

Construction
- Opened: 1961
- Renovated: 1975; 2004-2013; 2025
- Expanded: 1975

Tenant
- Flamurtari Vlorë

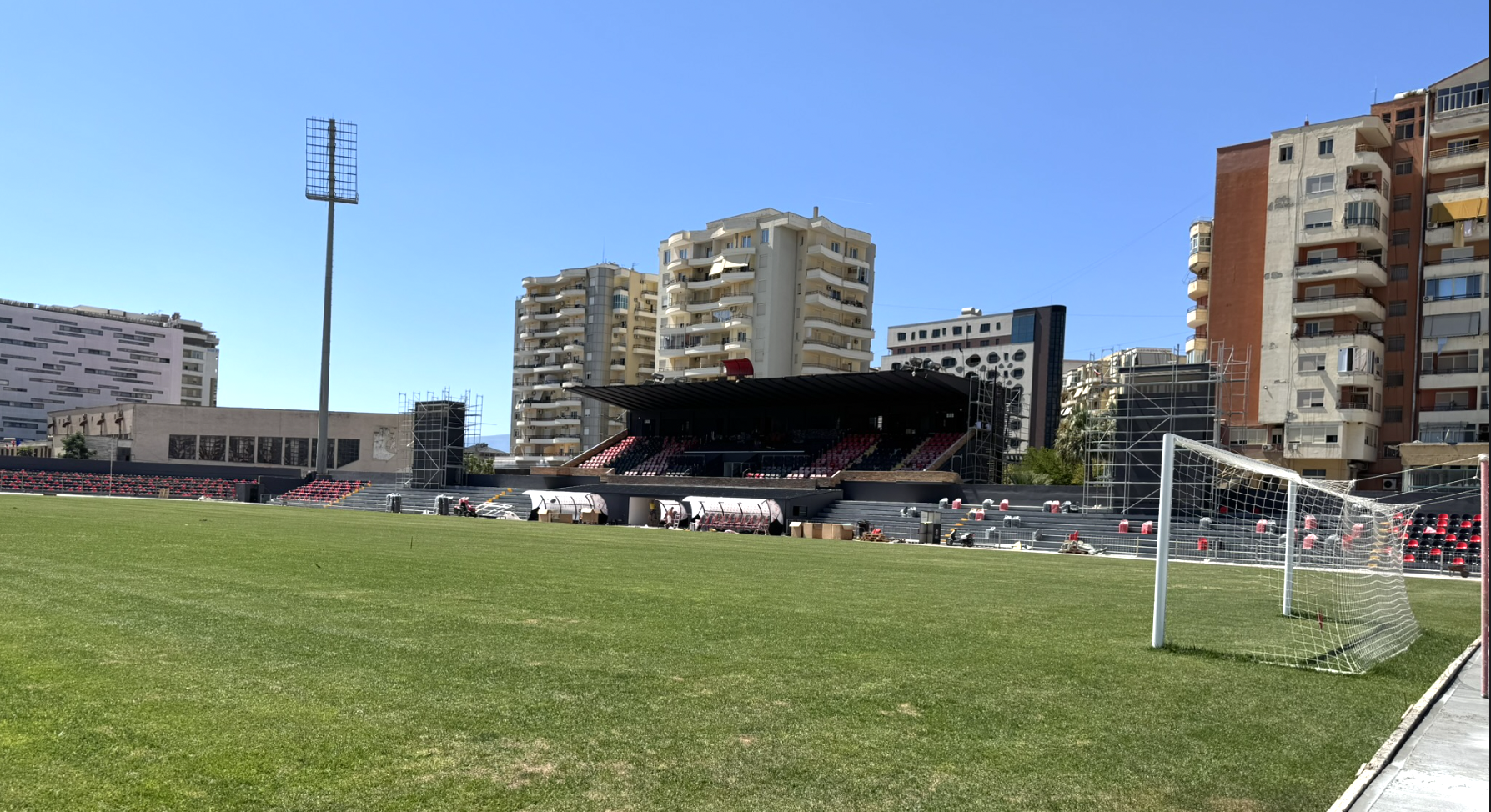
Flamurtari Stadium During Renovations August 27, 2025 at 12:52 PM

Flamurtari Stadium (Albanian: Stadiumi Flamurtari) is a multi-use stadium in Vlorë, Albania. It is currently used mostly for football matches and is the home ground of KS Flamurtari Vlorë. The stadium has a capacity of 9.500 seats.

Before the construction of the stadium, Flamurtari Vlorë played their home games on a field known as Varri i Halimit, which translates to Halimi's Tomb. The field was located near Uji i Ftohtë, which is where the club's training ground is located. The stadium was built in 1961 with an initial capacity of 6,500, and was expanded to 11,000 in 1975 following a reconstruction. During the club's golden era the stadium would attract crowds of up to 15,000 spectators and in 1987 when the club faced FC Barcelona in the UEFA Cup there was a crowd of 18,500, making it the ground's record attendance. Between 2004 and 2012, the ground was under recurring development with the aid of the Albanian Football Association which saw the ground converted into an all-seater stadium with a capacity of 8,200. In addition to the construction of the stands and the installation of seats, a new parking lot was built and floodlights were installed for the first time.

In February 2013, the new pitch was laid which was funded equally by the club and the Albanian Football Association and by the end of 2014–2015 season the stadium will be fully reconstructed and covered.

The stadium was built on the site of the old Venetian Vlorë Castle, demolished in 1906.

== Renovation ==
The stadium has undergone several renovations, with the most recent completed in the summer of 2025 as part of a broader effort to modernize the facility and bring it into the new century. A new roof was installed over the Tribuna Ballore, the facing stand. Seating was introduced throughout the stadium for the first time; previously, seats had only been available in the Tribuna Qendrore (Main Stand) and Tribuna Ballore.

Digital advertising boards were also added, along with a television screen in the south stand. In addition, several small two-story buildings were constructed around the stadium, providing restrooms and concession stands.
