= Paulin Dhëmbi =

Albanian footballer

Personal information
- Full name: Paulin Dhëmbi
- Date of birth: 9 August 1979 (age 47)
- Place of birth: Korçë, Albania
- Height: 1.84 m (6 ft 0 in)
- Position: Midfielder

Senior career*
| Years | Team | Apps | (Gls) |
| 1996–1998 | Skënderbeu | 18 | (0) |
| 1998–2002 | Dinamo Tirana | 78 | (8) |
| 2002–2003 | Partizani | 24 | (3) |
| 2003–2005 | Dinamo Tirana | 66 | (14) |
| 2006–2008 | Partizani | 82 | (16) |
| 2008–2009 | Vllaznia | 31 | (7) |
| 2009–2012 | Besa | 68 | (7) |
| Total | | 367 | (55) |

International career^{‡}
| 2000–2001 | Albania U21 | 5 | (0) |
| 2002 | Albania | 3 | (0) |
- * Club domestic league appearances and goals as of 9 May 2010 ‡ National team caps and goals as of 2 November 2009

Paulin Dhëmbi (born 9 August 1979 in Korçë) is a former Albanian football player who played for Skënderbeu Korçë, Dinamo Tirana, Partizani Tirana and Vllaznia Shkodër and Besa Kavajë, as well as the Albania national team.

== International career ==
He made his debut for Albania in a January 2002 Bahrain Tournament match against Macedonia and earned a total of 3 caps, scoring no goals. His final international was a March 2002 friendly match against Mexico in San Diego.

== Honours ==
=== Club ===
Dinamo Tirana

- Albanian Superliga (1): 2001–02

Besa Kavajë

- Albanian Cup (1): 2009–10
