= Artan Karapici =

Albanian footballer (born 1980)

Personal information
- Date of birth: 19 April 1980 (age 46)
- Place of birth: Durrës, Albania
- Position: Central midfielder

Senior career*
Years	Team	Apps	(Gls)
2001–2003	Erzeni	44	(10)
2003–2005	Vllaznia	48	(5)
2005–2006	Besa	20	(1)
2006–2010	Partizani	80	(15)
2011–2012	Kamza	23	(3)
2012–2014	Kastrioti	44	(1)
2014–2015	Adriatiku	21	(4)
2015–2016	Tërbuni	16	(1)

Managerial career
- 2022–: Tirana (asscoach)
- * Club domestic league appearances and goals

Artan Karapici (born 19 April 1980 in Durrës) is an Albanian retired footballer who finished his career at Tërbuni Pukë in the Albanian Superliga. Having begun his career with Erzeni Shijak in 2001, he has since played for Vllaznia Shkodër, Besa Kavajë, Partizani Tirana, KS Kamza and Kastrioti Krujë.

== Club career ==
Karapici signed a two-year contract with KS Kamza on 5 January 2011.
