= Hasan Lika =

Albanian footballer and coach

Personal information
- Full name: Hasan Lika
- Date of birth: 1 January 1960 (age 66)
- Place of birth: Tirana, PR Albania
- Height: 1.86 m (6 ft 1 in)
- Position: Midfielder

Youth career
- 1974–1978: Partizani

Senior career*
Years	Team	Apps	(Gls)
1978–1984	Partizani		

International career
1983	Albania	1	(0)

Managerial career
- 1994–1995: Partizani
- 1996: Lushnja
- 1999–2001: Teuta
- 2001–2003: Albania U-21
- 2002: Teuta
- 2003: Teuta
- 2003–2004: Teuta
- 2004–2005: Albania U-21
- 2005–2006: Teuta
- 2006: Besa
- 2006–2008: Partizani
- 2009: Vllaznia
- 2009–2010: Apolonia
- 2011–2012: Teuta
- 2013–2014: Partizani
- 2014: Teuta
- 2015–2016: Kukësi (assistant)
- 2016: Kukësi
- 2017–2018: Luftëtari
- 2018–2019: Vllaznia
- * Club domestic league appearances and goals

Hasan Lika (born 1 January 1960) is an Albanian professional football coach and former player.

== Club career ==
Lika spent his playing career representing Partizani Tirana from 1978 to 1984.

== International career ==
Lika won his first and only cap on 20 November 1983 against West Germany, appearing as a substitute in a 2–1 away defeat.

== Managerial career ==
=== Albania U21 ===
Lika coached Albania U21 team for the remaining four matches of 2002 UEFA European Under-21 Championship qualifiers. His first match in charge was the goalless draw against Greece on 1 June 2001. He led Albania to the first win of the qualifiers on 31 August, where they overwhelmed Finland 3–0 at home. Albania finished Group 9 in the last position with only four points, all taken with Lika in charge.

=== Apolonia Fier ===
On 19 November 2009, Lika took charge of Apolonia Fier for the remaining part of 2009–10 season. He had a disappointing stint at the club however, as Apolonia eventually relegated after finished 11th in the championship. At the time before Lika took charge, Apolonia was placed in 3rd position after 10 weeks.

=== Partizani Tirana ===
On 9 February 2014, Lika resigned as the coach of Partizani Tirana following the league defeat to cross-town rivals Tirana two days earlier.

=== Teuta Durrës ===
On 6 June 2014, Lika returned to Teuta Durrës for a fifth stint at the club, signing a contract for the upcoming season. However, his fifth spell at the club was short-lived as he was sacked by the president Edmond Hasabelliu on 25 November following a run of negative results in the league.

=== Kukësi ===
On 24 November 2015, Lika was appointed assistant coach of Klodian Duro at Kukësi. On 6 June 2016, Lika became the coach of the team following the departure of Duro. He resigned from his duty on 22 July following the elimination from Europa League.

=== Luftëtari Gjirokastër ===
On 17 October 2017, Lika was appointed new manager of top-flight side Luftëtari Gjirokastër, which risked relegation, signing until the end of the season. However, Lika changed the team's approach to the game entirely and guided them to a third-place finish, meaning that Luftëtari has qualified for the UEFA Europa League for the first time in history. He left the club officially on 31 May 2018 after his contract expired.

== Honours ==
- Albanian Superliga: 2

1979, 1981
