= 2017–18 Kategoria e Parë =

Kategoria e Parë
- Season: 2017–18
- Champions: Tirana; 1st title
- Promoted: Kastrioti; Tirana
- Relegated: Naftëtari; Shkumbini; Tërbuni; Vllaznia B
- Matches: 261
- Goals: 577 (2.21 per match)
- Top goalscorer: Albi Çekiçi (17 goals)
- Biggest home win: Tirana 6−0 Pogradeci (17 December 2017)
- Biggest away win: Shkumbini 0–6 Tirana (14 October 2017)
- Highest scoring: Turbina 5–3 Iliria (12 May 2018)
- Longest winning run: 6 matches Tirana
- Longest unbeaten run: 19 matches Tirana
- Longest winless run: 11 matches Besa
- Longest losing run: 5 matches Besa; Naftëtari; Tërbuni

The 2017–18 Kategoria e Parë was the 70th official season of the Albanian football second division since its establishment. The season began on 16 September 2017 and ended on 16 May 2018. There were 20 teams competing this season, split in 2 groups, each with 10 teams. The top 5 teams from each group qualified to the promotion round, while the last teams qualified to the relegation round. The 2 winners of the qualification round gained promotion to the 2018–19 Kategoria Superiore, and played the division's final against each other. Kastrioti and Tirana were promoted to the 2018–19 Kategoria Superiore. Naftëtari, Shkumbini, Tërbuni, Vllaznia B were relegated to the 2018−19 Kategoria e Dytë. Tirana won their first Kategoria e Parë title on 16 May 2018 after beating Kastrioti in the final match.

== Changes from last season ==
=== Team changes ===
==== From Kategoria e Parë ====
Promoted to Kategoria Superiore:

- KF Lushnja
- FC Kamza

Relegated to Kategoria e Dytë:

- Adriatiku
- KF Elbasani
- Sopoti

==== To Kategoria e Parë ====
Relegated from Kategoria Superiore:

- KF Tirana
- Korabi

Promoted from Kategoria e Dytë:

- FK Egnatia
- Naftëtari
- Vllaznia B

=== Locations ===
2017–18 Group A Kategoria e Parë teams.
2017–18 Group B Kategoria e Parë teams.

=== Stadia by capacity and locations ===
==== Group A ====
| Team | Location | Stadium | Capacity |
|---|---|---|---|
| Besa | Kavajë | Besa Stadium | 8,000 |
| Besëlidhja | Lezhë | Brian Filipi Stadium | 5,000 |
| Dinamo Tirana | Tirana | Selman Stërmasi Stadium | 9,600 |
| KS Burreli | Burrel | Liri Ballabani Stadium | 2,500 |
| KF Erzeni | Shijak | Tofik Jashari Stadium | 4,000 |
| Egnatia | Rrogozhinë | Egnatia Stadium | 4,000 |
| KF Korabi | Peshkopi | Korabi Stadium | 6,000 |
| Kastrioti | Krujë | Kastrioti Stadium | 8,400 |
| KF Tërbuni | Pukë | Ismail Xhemali Stadium | 1,950 |
| Vllaznia B | Shkodër | Reshit Rusi Stadium | 1,200 |

==== Group B ====
| Team | Location | Stadium | Capacity |
|---|---|---|---|
| Apolonia | Fier | Loni Papuçiu Stadium | 6,800 |
| Bylis | Ballsh | Adush Muça Stadium | 5,200 |
| KS Iliria | Fushë-Krujë | Redi Maloku Stadium | 3,000 |
| FK Shënkolli | Shënkoll | Kastrioti Stadium | 8,400 |
| KS Pogradeci | Pogradec | Gjorgji Kyçyku Stadium | 10,700 |
| Shkumbini | Peqin | Shkumbini Stadium | 5,000 |
| Naftëtari | Kuçovë | Stadiumi Bashkim Sulejmani | 5,000 |
| KF Tirana | Tirana | Selman Stërmasi Stadium | 9,500 |
| Tomori | Berat | Tomori Stadium | 14,750 |
| Turbina | Cërrik | Nexhip Trungu Stadium | 6,600 |

== First phase ==
=== Group A ===
| Pos | Team | Pld | W | D | L | GF | GA | GD | Pts | Qualification |
|---|---|---|---|---|---|---|---|---|---|---|
| 1 | Kastrioti | 18 | 14 | 2 | 2 | 24 | 7 | +17 | 44 | Qualification for the Promotion round |
| 2 | Egnatia | 18 | 8 | 5 | 5 | 18 | 11 | +7 | 29 | Qualification for the Promotion round |
| 3 | Erzeni | 18 | 7 | 5 | 6 | 22 | 20 | +2 | 26 | Qualification for the Promotion round |
| 4 | Besëlidhja | 18 | 7 | 3 | 8 | 19 | 16 | +3 | 24 | Qualification for the Promotion round |
| 5 | Dinamo Tirana | 18 | 6 | 6 | 6 | 10 | 12 | −2 | 24 | Qualification for the Promotion round |
| 6 | Korabi | 18 | 6 | 5 | 7 | 18 | 20 | −2 | 23 | Qualification for the Relegation round |
| 7 | Besa | 18 | 6 | 3 | 9 | 15 | 21 | −6 | 21 | Qualification for the Relegation round |
| 8 | Tërbuni | 18 | 5 | 5 | 8 | 16 | 23 | −7 | 20 | Qualification for the Relegation round |
| 9 | Burreli | 18 | 5 | 4 | 9 | 12 | 18 | −6 | 19 | Qualification for the Relegation round |
| 10 | Vllaznia B | 18 | 5 | 4 | 9 | 10 | 16 | −6 | 19 | Qualification for the Relegation round |

Source: Soccerway
Rules for classification: 1) points; 2) goal difference; 3) number of goals scored; 4) head-to-head points; 5) head-to-head goal difference; 6) draw. (Head-to-head record is applied for clubs with the same number of points only once all matches between said clubs have been played.)

=== Group B ===
| Pos | Team | Pld | W | D | L | GF | GA | GD | Pts | Qualification |
|---|---|---|---|---|---|---|---|---|---|---|
| 1 | Tirana | 18 | 14 | 3 | 1 | 46 | 6 | +40 | 45 | Qualification to the Promotion round |
| 2 | Bylis | 18 | 12 | 5 | 1 | 34 | 13 | +21 | 41 | Qualification to the Promotion round |
| 3 | Apolonia | 18 | 9 | 4 | 5 | 31 | 19 | +12 | 31 | Qualification to the Promotion round |
| 4 | Pogradeci | 18 | 8 | 3 | 7 | 23 | 24 | −1 | 27 | Qualification to the Promotion round |
| 5 | Tomori | 18 | 8 | 2 | 8 | 23 | 20 | +3 | 26 | Qualification to the Promotion round |
| 6 | Iliria | 18 | 8 | 1 | 9 | 19 | 21 | −2 | 25 | Qualification to the Relegation round |
| 7 | Shënkolli | 18 | 7 | 2 | 9 | 21 | 31 | −10 | 23 | Qualification to the Relegation round |
| 8 | Turbina | 18 | 4 | 3 | 11 | 19 | 33 | −14 | 15 | Qualification to the Relegation round |
| 9 | Shkumbini | 18 | 4 | 3 | 11 | 9 | 29 | −20 | 15 | Qualification to the Relegation round |
| 10 | Naftëtari | 18 | 2 | 2 | 14 | 13 | 42 | −29 | 8 | Qualification to the Relegation round |

Source: Soccerway
Rules for classification: 1) points; 2) goal difference; 3) number of goals scored; 4) head-to-head points; 5) head-to-head goal difference; 6) draw. (Head-to-head record is applied for clubs with the same number of points only once all matches between said clubs have been played.)

== Second phase ==
=== Promotion round ===
==== Group A ====
| Pos | Team | Pld | W | D | L | GF | GA | GD | Pts | Promotion |
|---|---|---|---|---|---|---|---|---|---|---|
| 1 | Kastrioti (P) | 8 | 5 | 2 | 1 | 39 | 13 | +26 | 39 | Promotion to the 2018–19 Kategoria Superiore |
| 2 | Egnatia | 8 | 5 | 0 | 3 | 31 | 22 | +9 | 30 | |
| 3 | Erzeni | 8 | 5 | 0 | 3 | 34 | 30 | +4 | 28 | |
| 4 | Besëlidhja | 8 | 2 | 2 | 4 | 25 | 26 | −1 | 20 | |
| 5 | Dinamo Tirana | 8 | 0 | 2 | 6 | 14 | 25 | −11 | 14 | |

Source: Soccerway
Rules for classification: 1) points; 2) goal difference; 3) number of goals scored; 4) head-to-head points; 5) head-to-head goal difference; 6) draw. (Head-to-head record is applied for clubs with the same number of points only once all matches between said clubs have been played.)
(P) Promoted

==== Group B ====
| Pos | Team | Pld | W | D | L | GF | GA | GD | Pts | Promotion |
|---|---|---|---|---|---|---|---|---|---|---|
| 1 | Tirana (C, P) | 8 | 7 | 1 | 0 | 66 | 13 | +53 | 42 | Promotion to the 2018–19 Kategoria Superiore |
| 2 | Bylis | 8 | 2 | 2 | 4 | 43 | 24 | +19 | 29 | |
| 3 | Apolonia | 8 | 2 | 2 | 4 | 38 | 30 | +8 | 24 | |
| 4 | Tomori | 8 | 2 | 3 | 3 | 34 | 33 | +1 | 22 | |
| 5 | Pogradeci | 8 | 2 | 2 | 4 | 33 | 39 | −6 | 22 | |

Source: Soccerway
Rules for classification: 1) points; 2) goal difference; 3) number of goals scored; 4) head-to-head points; 5) head-to-head goal difference; 6) draw. (Head-to-head record is applied for clubs with the same number of points only once all matches between said clubs have been played.)
(C) Champions; (P) Promoted

=== Relegation round ===
==== Group A ====
| Pos | Team | Pld | W | D | L | GF | GA | GD | Pts | Relegation |
|---|---|---|---|---|---|---|---|---|---|---|
| 6 | Korabi | 8 | 3 | 2 | 3 | 28 | 30 | −2 | 23 | |
| 7 | Burreli | 8 | 3 | 3 | 2 | 20 | 24 | −4 | 22 | |
| 8 | Besa | 8 | 3 | 2 | 3 | 28 | 34 | −6 | 22 | |
| 9 | Vllaznia B (Note: Vllaznia B was automatically relegated to the 2018−19 Albanian Second Division, after the relegation of the main team to the Albanian First Division.) (R) | 8 | 3 | 2 | 3 | 20 | 27 | −7 | 21 | Relegation to 2018–19 Kategoria e Dytë |
| 10 | Tërbuni (R) | 8 | 2 | 3 | 3 | 21 | 29 | −8 | 19 | Relegation to 2018–19 Kategoria e Dytë |

Source: Soccerway
Rules for classification: 1) points; 2) goal difference; 3) number of goals scored; 4) head-to-head points; 5) head-to-head goal difference; 6) draw. (Head-to-head record is applied for clubs with the same number of points only once all matches between said clubs have been played.)
(R) Relegated

==== Group B ====
| Pos | Team | Pld | W | D | L | GF | GA | GD | Pts | Relegation |
|---|---|---|---|---|---|---|---|---|---|---|
| 6 | Iliria | 8 | 3 | 1 | 4 | 33 | 35 | −2 | 23 | |
| 7 | Shënkolli | 8 | 3 | 1 | 4 | 36 | 50 | −14 | 22 | |
| 8 | Turbina | 8 | 4 | 1 | 3 | 36 | 49 | −13 | 21 | |
| 9 | Shkumbini (R) | 8 | 3 | 2 | 3 | 21 | 39 | −18 | 16 | Play-out relegation to 2018–19 Kategoria e Dytë |
| 10 | Naftëtari (R) | 8 | 3 | 3 | 2 | 23 | 51 | −28 | 16 | Relegation to 2018–19 Kategoria e Dytë |

Source: Soccerway
Rules for classification: 1) points; 2) goal difference; 3) number of goals scored; 4) head-to-head points; 5) head-to-head goal difference; 6) draw. (Head-to-head record is applied for clubs with the same number of points only once all matches between said clubs have been played.)
(R) Relegated

== Final ==
16 May 2018
17:00

| Tirana | 2−0 | Kastrioti |
|---|---|---|
| Greca 64', 71' |

Elbasan Arena, Elbasan
Referee: Enea Jorgji

== Relegation play-offs ==
19 May 2018
16:30

| Shkumbini | 0−1 | Veleçiku |
|---|---|---|
| | | Çokaj 80' (pen.) |

Selman Stërmasi Stadium, Tirana

== Season statistics ==
=== Scoring ===
As of 16 May 2018

==== Top scorers ====
| Rank | Player | Club | Goals |
|---|---|---|---|
| 1 | (Albania) Albi Çekiçi | Pogradeci | 17 |
| 2 | (Albania) Ruben Danaj | Shënkolli | 16 |
| 3 | (Albania) Bedri Greca | Tirana | 14 |
