= 2023–24 Kategoria e Dytë =

Kategoria e Dytë
- Season: 2023–24
- Champions: Pogradeci; 3rd title
- Promoted: Pogradeci; Valbona
- Relegated: Labëria; Shënkolli
- Matches: 221
- Goals: 669 (3.03 per match)
- Top goalscorer: Gerhard Progni (15 goals)
- Biggest home win: Iliria 6−0 Naftëtari (23 September 2023)
- Biggest away win: Devolli 0−6 Pogradeci (3 December 2023)
- Highest scoring: Gramshi 6−4 Veleçiku (5 May 2024)
- Longest winning run: 11 matches Besëlidhja
- Longest unbeaten run: 21 matches Pogradeci
- Longest winless run: 16 matches Këlcyra
- Longest losing run: 16 matches Këlcyra

The 2023–24 Kategoria e Dytë was the 54th official season of the Albanian football third division since its establishment. There were 23 teams competing this season, split in 2 groups. The winners of the groups played the league's final against each other and also gained promotion to the 2024–25 Kategoria e Parë. Teams ranked from the 2nd to the 5th position will qualify to the play-off round where the winners will play against the 9th and 10th ranked teams in the 2023–24 Kategoria e Parë. Pogradeci and Valbona were promoted to the 2024–25 Kategoria e Parë. Pogradeci won their third Kategoria e Dytë title after beating Valbona in the final match.

== Changes from last season ==
=== Team changes ===
==== From Kategoria e Dytë ====
Promoted to Kategoria e Parë:

- Elbasani
- Vora

Relegated to Kategoria e Tretë:

- Ada
- Albpetrol
- Bulqiza
- Memaliaj
- Tepelena

==== To Kategoria e Dytë ====
Relegated from Kategoria e Parë:

- Besëlidhja
- Oriku
- Tërbuni
- Turbina

Promoted from Kategoria e Tretë:

- Adriatiku
- Albanët
- Këlcyra

=== Locations ===
2023–24 Group A Kategoria e Dytë teams.
2023–24 Group B Kategoria e Dytë teams.

=== Stadiums by capacity and locations ===
==== Group A ====
| Team | Location | Stadium | Capacity |
|---|---|---|---|
| Adriatiku | Katund i Ri | Vorë Stadium | |
| Albanët | Tirana | Internacional Complex | 1,000 |
| Besëlidhja | Lezhë | Brian Filipi Stadium | 5,000 |
| Gramshi | Gramsh | Mislim Koçi Stadium | 3,100 |
| Iliria | Fushë-Krujë | Redi Maloku Stadium | 3,000 |
| Murlani | Vau i Dejës | Barbullush Stadium | |
| Naftëtari | Kuçovë | Bashkim Sulejmani Stadium | 5,000 |
| Shënkolli | Shënkoll | Shënkoll Stadium | 500 |
| Sopoti | Librazhd | Sopoti Stadium | 3,000 |
| Tërbuni | Pukë | Ismail Xhemali Stadium | 1,950 |
| Valbona | Bajram Curri | Vëllezërit Gega Stadium | |
| Veleçiku | Koplik | Kompleksi Vëllezërit Duli | 2,000 |

==== Group B ====
| Team | Location | Stadium | Capacity |
|---|---|---|---|
| Butrinti | Sarandë | Andon Lapa Stadium | 5,500 |
| Delvina | Delvinë | Panajot Pano Stadium | 2,500 |
| Devolli | Bilisht | Bilisht Stadium | 3,000 |
| Këlcyra | Këlcyrë | Demir Allamani Stadium | 1,000 |
| Labëria | Vlorë | Labëria Complex | |
| Luftëtari | Gjirokastër | Gjirokastra Stadium | 8,400 |
| Maliqi | Maliq | Jovan Asko Stadium | 1,500 |
| Oriku | Orikum | Orikum Stadium | 2,000 |
| Pogradeci | Pogradec | Gjorgji Kyçyku Stadium | 10,700 |
| Shkumbini | Peqin | Shkumbini Stadium | 9,000 |
| Turbina | Cërrik | Nexhip Trungu Stadium | 6,600 |

== League standings ==
=== Group A ===
| Pos | Team | Pld | W | D | L | GF | GA | GD | Pts | Promotion or relegation |
|---|---|---|---|---|---|---|---|---|---|---|
| 1 | Valbona (P) | 20 | 18 | 1 | 1 | 60 | 15 | +45 | 55 | Promotion to 2024–25 Kategoria e Parë |
| 2 | Besëlidhja | 20 | 17 | 2 | 1 | 49 | 11 | +38 | 53 | Play-off promotion to 2024–25 Kategoria e Parë |
| 3 | Iliria | 20 | 12 | 5 | 3 | 45 | 18 | +27 | 41 | Play-off promotion to 2024–25 Kategoria e Parë |
| 4 | Tërbuni | 20 | 11 | 5 | 4 | 41 | 22 | +19 | 38 | Play-off promotion to 2024–25 Kategoria e Parë |
| 5 | Sopoti | 20 | 9 | 4 | 7 | 36 | 26 | +10 | 31 | Play-off promotion to 2024–25 Kategoria e Parë |
| 6 | Veleçiku | 20 | 6 | 4 | 10 | 33 | 36 | −3 | 22 | |
| 7 | Gramshi | 20 | 6 | 3 | 11 | 30 | 30 | 0 | 21 | |
| 8 | Adriatiku | 20 | 5 | 3 | 12 | 20 | 38 | −18 | 18 | |
| 9 | Naftëtari | 20 | 3 | 4 | 13 | 15 | 56 | −41 | 13 | |
| 10 | Murlani | 20 | 3 | 3 | 14 | 18 | 49 | −31 | 12 | |
| 11 | Albanët (O) | 20 | 2 | 2 | 16 | 16 | 62 | −46 | 8 | Play-off relegation to 2024–25 Kategoria e Tretë |
| 12 | Shënkolli (Note: Shënkolli was excluded from the league and relegated to the Kategoria e Tretë for the next season, after a violent incident during a match against Murlani in the 10th round.) (D, R) | 0 | 0 | 0 | 0 | 0 | 0 | 0 | 0 | Excluded; all results annulled |

Rules for classification: 1) points; 2) head-to-head points; 3) head-to-head goal difference; 4) goal difference; 5) number of goals scored; 6) draw. (Head-to-head record is applied for clubs with the same number of points only once all matches between said clubs have been played.)
(D) Disqualified; (O) Play-off winners; (P) Promoted; (R) Relegated

==== Results ====
| Home \ Away | ADR | ALB | BES | GRA | ILI | MUR | NAF | SOP | TËR | VAL | VEL |
|---|---|---|---|---|---|---|---|---|---|---|---|
| Adriatiku | — | 2–0 | 0–3 | 2–3 | 0–2 | 2–1 | 2–2 | 0–1 | 2–4 | 0–5 | 1–0 |
| Albanët | 0–3 | — | 0–4 | 2–1 | 0–3 | 1–3 | 2–0 | 3–6 | 0–4 | 0–5 | 1–2 |
| Besëlidhja | 4–0 | 4–1 | — | 1–0 | 0–0 | 2–0 | 3–1 | 1–0 | 3–3 | 3–0 | 3–1 |
| Gramshi | 1–2 | 4–0 | 0–2 | — | 0–0 | 2–0 | 5–0 | 1–1 | 1–1 | 1–2 | 6–4 |
| Iliria | 2–1 | 5–2 | 0–1 | 2–0 | — | 3–1 | 6–0 | 6–1 | 3–1 | 1–1 | 3–1 |
| Murlani | 1–1 | 0–0 | 0–2 | 4–3 | 1–1 | — | 3–2 | 0–1 | 0–1 | 1–5 | 0–3 |
| Naftëtari | 1–1 | 3–1 | 0–5 | 1–0 | 0–2 | 2–1 | — | 0–0 | 0–2 | 0–5 | 1–4 |
| Sopoti | 1–0 | 5–2 | 1–2 | 2–0 | 2–0 | 5–0 | 4–0 | — | 2–2 | 1–3 | 1–2 |
| Tërbuni | 3–0 | 2–0 | 1–2 | 1–0 | 2–2 | 3–1 | 3–0 | 1–0 | — | 0–1 | 4–1 |
| Valbona | 2–0 | 6–1 | 3–2 | 3–0 | 1–0 | 5–1 | 5–0 | 2–1 | 3–2 | — | 1–0 |
| Veleçiku | 2–1 | 0–0 | 0–2 | 0–2 | 3–4 | 5–0 | 2–2 | 1–1 | 1–1 | 1–2 | — |

Legend: Blue = home team win; Yellow = draw; Red = away team win.
For upcoming matches, an "a" indicates there is an article about the rivalry between the two participants.

=== Group B ===
| Pos | Team | Pld | W | D | L | GF | GA | GD | Pts | Promotion or relegation |
|---|---|---|---|---|---|---|---|---|---|---|
| 1 | Pogradeci (C, P) | 20 | 16 | 4 | 0 | 40 | 11 | +29 | 52 | Promotion to 2024–25 Kategoria e Parë |
| 2 | Luftëtari | 20 | 15 | 3 | 2 | 37 | 16 | +21 | 48 | Play-off promotion to 2024–25 Kategoria e Parë |
| 3 | Shkumbini | 20 | 13 | 3 | 4 | 30 | 16 | +14 | 42 | Play-off promotion to 2024–25 Kategoria e Parë |
| 4 | Oriku | 20 | 8 | 4 | 8 | 27 | 20 | +7 | 28 | Play-off promotion to 2024–25 Kategoria e Parë |
| 5 | Butrinti | 20 | 8 | 3 | 9 | 28 | 24 | +4 | 27 | Play-off promotion to 2024–25 Kategoria e Parë |
| 6 | Labëria (Note: Labëria failed to get licensed and was relegated to the Kategoria e Tretë.) (R) | 20 | 8 | 3 | 9 | 25 | 28 | −3 | 27 | Relegation to 2024–25 Kategoria e Tretë |
| 7 | Devolli | 20 | 7 | 3 | 10 | 33 | 38 | −5 | 24 | |
| 8 | Turbina | 20 | 7 | 2 | 11 | 27 | 36 | −9 | 23 | |
| 9 | Delvina | 20 | 5 | 5 | 10 | 26 | 34 | −8 | 20 | |
| 10 | Maliqi (O) | 20 | 4 | 2 | 14 | 23 | 37 | −14 | 14 | Play-off relegation to 2024–25 Kategoria e Tretë |
| 11 | Këlcyra | 20 | 3 | 0 | 17 | 9 | 45 | −36 | 9 | |

Rules for classification: 1) points; 2) head-to-head points; 3) head-to-head goal difference; 4) goal difference; 5) number of goals scored; 6) draw. (Head-to-head record is applied for clubs with the same number of points only once all matches between said clubs have been played.)
(C) Champions; (O) Play-off winners; (P) Promoted; (R) Relegated

==== Results ====
| Home \ Away | BUT | DEL | DEV | KËL | LAB | LUF | MAL | ORI | POG | SHK | TUR |
|---|---|---|---|---|---|---|---|---|---|---|---|
| Butrinti | — | 2–3 | 3–2 | 3–0 | 0–1 | 4–2 | 4–1 | 1–1 | 1–3 | 0–0 | 2–0 |
| Delvina | 1–3 | — | 1–2 | 4–1 | 2–1 | 1–2 | 3–0 | 0–0 | 1–2 | 1–2 | 0–0 |
| Devolli | 2–0 | 1–1 | — | 3–0 | 2–2 | 2–2 | 3–2 | 2–1 | 0–6 | 0–2 | 2–3 |
| Këlcyra | 1–2 | 0–4 | 0–3 | — | 1–2 | 0–1 | 1–0 | 0–2 | 0–2 | 0–1 | 1–0 |
| Labëria | 0–1 | 4–1 | 0–2 | 4–0 | — | 1–2 | 1–0 | 1–0 | 0–0 | 1–4 | 0–3 |
| Luftëtari | 1–0 | 3–1 | 3–0 | 1–0 | 3–1 | — | 4–0 | 1–0 | 1–1 | 1–0 | 3–0 |
| Maliqi | 0–0 | 1–1 | 5–4 | 3–0 | 0–1 | 2–3 | — | 1–2 | 0–2 | 4–0 | 3–2 |
| Oriku | 2–1 | 4–0 | 1–0 | 1–2 | 1–1 | 2–3 | 1–0 | — | 1–1 | 1–0 | 4–0 |
| Pogradeci | 1–0 | 3–0 | 2–1 | 3–1 | 1–0 | 1–0 | 1–0 | 1–0 | — | 2–2 | 4–1 |
| Shkumbini | 2–1 | 2–0 | 3–2 | 3–0 | 3–1 | 0–0 | 1–0 | 1–0 | 0–1 | — | 2–0 |
| Turbina | 1–0 | 1–1 | 1–0 | 3–1 | 2–3 | 0–1 | 3–1 | 4–3 | 2–3 | 1–2 | — |

Legend: Blue = home team win; Yellow = draw; Red = away team win.
For upcoming matches, an "a" indicates there is an article about the rivalry between the two participants.

== Final ==
10 May 2024
18:00

| Valbona | 0−1 | Pogradeci |
|---|---|---|
| | | Danladi 64' |

Elbasan Arena, Elbasan
Referee: Emanuela Rusta

== Group A Promotion play-offs ==
Semi-finals
Besëlidhja | 0
Sopoti | 2
Iliria | 2
Tërbuni | 0

Final
Sopoti | 1
Iliria | 6

== Semi-finals ==
9 May 2024
16:00

| Besëlidhja | 0−2 | Sopoti |
|---|---|---|
| | | Tanushi 45'; M. Çota 76' |

Brian Filipi Stadium, Lezhë
Referee: Endrit Zhuli

9 May 2024
16:00

| Iliria | 2−0 | Tërbuni |
|---|---|---|
| Olatunbosun 45'; Berisha 49' |

Redi Maloku Stadium, Fushë-Krujë
Referee: Ditmir Grimci

== Final ==
12 May 2024
15:00

| Sopoti | 1−6 | Iliria |
|---|---|---|
| Rreshka 23' | | Olatunbosun 48'; Kallaku 54'; Xeka 66'; Gjinaj 81', 82'; Lleshi 90' |

Niko Dovana Stadium, Durrës
Referee: Albert Doda

Iliria qualified to the final play-off match.

== Group B Promotion play-offs ==
Semi-finals
Luftëtari | 1
Butrinti | 0
Shkumbini | 2
Oriku | 0

Final
Luftëtari | 3
Shkumbini | 0

== Semi-finals ==
9 May 2024
16:00

| Luftëtari | 1−0 | Butrinti |
|---|---|---|
| Ziaj 83' |

Gjirokastra Stadium, Gjirokastër
Referee: Olti Çela

9 May 2024
16:00

| Shkumbini | 2−0 | Oriku |
|---|---|---|
| Ernandes 29'; Teqja 51' |

Shkumbini Stadium, Peqin
Referee: Erald Demiraj

== Final ==
12 May 2024
15:00

| Luftëtari | 3−0 | Shkumbini |
|---|---|---|
| Mërkuri 11', 66', 86' |

Adush Muça Stadium, Ballsh
Referee: Indrit Myrtja

Luftëtari qualified to the final play-off match.

== Relegation play-offs ==
10 May 2024
15:00

| Albanët | 2−3 | Maliqi |
|---|---|---|
| Alushi 22'; Topalli 39' | | Awam Agu 8'; Topalli 13' (o.g.); Tako 17' |

Shkumbini Stadium, Peqin
Referee: Ermal Gryka

16 May 2024
16:00

| Albanët | 5−2 | Albpetrol |
|---|---|---|
| Alushi 4', 73'; Abazi 12'; Topalli 19'; Dermani 72' | | Asimetaj 21'; Kumanaku 63' |

Vorë Stadium, Vorë
Referee: Xhuljano Bacaj

Both teams remained in their respective divisions.

== Top scorers ==
| Rank | Player | Club | Goals |
|---|---|---|---|
| 1 | (Albania) Gerhard Progni | Valbona | 15 |
| 2 | (Albania) Brajan Shekaj | Veleçiku | 14 |
| 3 | (Albania) Dario Kame | Devolli | 12 |
| 3 | (Albania) Rigers Musaraj | Besëlidhja | 12 |
| 5 | (Albania) Jurgen Gjini | Tërbuni | 10 |
| 6 | (Albania) Alesio Kolonja | Butrinti | 9 |
| 6 | (Albania) Ersil Ymeri | Valbona | 9 |
| 6 | (Brazil) Murilo Brisida | Gramshi | 9 |
