= 2026–27 Kategoria e Parë =

Kategoria e Parë
- Season: 2026–27
- Dates: 5 September 2026 – 2 May 2027
- Matches: 63
- Goals: 141 (2.24 per match)
- Top goalscorer: Darnell Kithambo; Festim Alidema; Manfredas Ruzgis (6 goals each)
- Biggest home win: Besa 5−0 Oriku (16 September 2026)
- Biggest away win: Sopoti 0−4 Besa (12 September 2026)
- Highest scoring: Besëlidhja 5−2 Sopoti (28 October 2026)
- Longest winning run: 5 matches Iliria
- Longest unbeaten run: 10 matches Bylis
- Longest winless run: 10 matches Oriku
- Longest losing run: 6 matches Oriku

The 2026–27 Kategoria e Parë is the 79th official season of the Albanian football second-tier since its establishment. The season will begin on 5 September 2026 and will end on 2 May 2027. There are 12 teams competing this season. The winning and runner-up teams will gain promotion to the 2027–28 Kategoria Superiore, along with the play-off winners. The promotion play-offs final's loser will play a promotion play-off match against the 9th ranked team of the 2026–27 Kategoria Superiore.

== Changes from last season ==
=== Team changes ===
==== From Kategoria e Parë ====
Promoted to Kategoria Superiore:

- Laçi
- Skënderbeu

Relegated to Kategoria e Dytë:

- Apolonia
- Luftëtari
- Lushnja

==== To Kategoria e Parë ====
Relegated from Kategoria Superiore:

- Bylis
- Flamurtari

Promoted from Kategoria e Dytë:

- Besëlidhja
- Oriku
- Sopoti

== Teams ==
2026–27 Kategoria e Parë teams.

=== Stadia by capacity and locations ===
Team	Location	Stadium	Capacity
Besa	Kavajë	Fusha e Akademisë KF Besa	
Besëlidhja	Lezhë	Besëlidhja Stadium	5,000
Burreli	Burrel	Liri Ballabani Stadium	3,000
Bylis	Ballsh	Adush Muçaj Stadium	2,464
Flamurtari	Vlorë	Flamurtari Stadium	9,500
Iliria	Fushë-Krujë	Redi Maloku Stadium	1,000
Kastrioti	Krujë	Redi Maloku Stadium	1,000
Korabi	Peshkopi	Korabi Stadium	6,000
Kukësi	Kukës	Kukës Arena	6,322
Oriku	Orikum	Orikum Stadium	2,000
Pogradeci	Pogradec	Gjorgji Kyçyku Stadium	10,700
Sopoti	Librazhd	Sopoti Stadium	3,000

=== Personnel and kits ===
Note: Flags indicate national team as has been defined under FIFA eligibility rules. Players and Managers may hold more than one non-FIFA nationality.

Team	President	Manager	Captain	Kit manufacturer	Shirt sponsor
Besa	(Albania) Nexhat Bizhdili	(Albania) Gugash Magani	(Albania) Ermir Spahiu	Macron	
Besëlidhja	(Albania) Pjerin Fushaj	(Albania) Mirel Josa	(Albania) Erisildo Smaçi	Macron	Colosseo Group
Burreli	(Albania) Agron Malaj	(Albania) Klevis Dalipi	(Albania) Robin Hoti	Givova	Flumen Park
Bylis	(Albania) Besnik Kapllanaj	(Albania) Arlind Rustemi	(Albania) Aurel Marku	Macron	
Flamurtari	(Albania) Sinan Idrizi	(Albania) Oltijon Kërnaja	(Albania) Denis Pjeshka	Macron	
Iliria	(Albania) Nazmi Selmani	(Albania) Dritan Smajlaj	(Albania) Adolf Selmani	Dominer	Carpe Diem Beach
Kastrioti	(Albania) Alban Vogli	(Albania) Sokol Neziri	(Albania) Dejvid Kapllani	Joma	Qafshtama
Korabi	(Albania) Fehmi Mëziu	(Albania) Sokol Mziu	(Albania) Taulant Marku	Joma	
Kukësi	(Albania) Atilio Biba	(Albania) Bledi Kadiu	(Albania) Erest Lamellari	Suzmar	Lajthiza
Oriku	(Albania) Muharrem Jazoj	(Albania) Gerd Haxhiu	(Albania) Julian Gjinaj	Macron	Alb-Adriatico
Pogradeci	(Albania) Ilir Xhakolli	(Albania) Dritan Mehmeti	(Albania) Paolo Kasmollari	Macron	Armaar Group
Sopoti	(Albania) Kastriot Gurra	(Albania) Rrahman Hallaçi	(Albania) Endri Goci	Givova	

== League table ==
Pos	Team	Pld	W	D	L	GF	GA	GD	Pts	Promotion or relegation
1	Iliria	10	6	3	1	13	8	+5	21	Promotion to 2027–28 Kategoria Superiore
2	Pogradeci	11	5	5	1	15	8	+7	20	Promotion to 2027–28 Kategoria Superiore
3	Bylis	10	4	6	0	11	6	+5	18	Promotion play-off to 2027–28 Kategoria Superiore
4	Kukësi	11	6	0	5	13	11	+2	18	Promotion play-off to 2027–28 Kategoria Superiore
5	Besa	10	5	3	2	21	10	+11	18	Promotion play-off to 2027–28 Kategoria Superiore
6	Flamurtari	10	4	4	2	14	8	+6	16	Promotion play-off to 2027–28 Kategoria Superiore
7	Korabi	11	4	3	4	7	11	−4	15	
8	Besëlidhja	10	4	2	4	13	10	+3	14	
9	Kastrioti	10	3	2	5	11	13	−2	11	Relegation play-out to 2027–28 Kategoria e Dytë
10	Sopoti	11	1	4	6	12	24	−12	7	Relegation play-out to 2027–28 Kategoria e Dytë
11	Burreli	11	1	4	6	7	14	−7	7	Relegation to 2027–28 Kategoria e Dytë
12	Oriku	11	1	2	8	4	18	−14	5	Relegation to 2027–28 Kategoria e Dytë

Updated to match(es) played on 22 November 2026. Source:
Rules for classification: 1) Points; 2) Head-to-head points; 3) Head-to-head goal difference; 4) Head-to-head goals scored; 5) Goal difference; 6) Goals scored; 7) Draw.

=== Rounds 1–22 ===
Home \ Away	BES	BSL	BUR	BYL	FLA	ILI	KAS	KOR	KUK	ORI	POG	SOP
Besa	—		1–1		3–3	2–0		2–0		5–0	3–2	
Besëlidhja	2–1	—					4–1	1–2				5–2
Burreli		0–0	—	0–2			2–2		1–2		0–1	1–3
Bylis	0–0	0–0		—			2–1		1–0		2–2	1–1
Flamurtari		1–0	1–1		—				2–0			2–0
Iliria			1–0	1–1	2–1	—			3–1	1–0	0–0	
Kastrioti					1–0	0–1	—	2–0		2–0		
Korabi			1–0	0–0	0–0	1–1		—		1–0	0–2	
Kukësi	2–0	2–0					1–0	3–0	—		0–3	2–0
Oriku		0–1	0–1	1–2	1–4				1–0	—		
Pogradeci		1–0			0–0		2–1			0–0	—	2–2
Sopoti	0–4					2–3	1–1	0–2		1–1		—

Updated to match(es) played on 22 November 2026. Source:
Legend: Blue = home team win; Yellow = draw; Red = away team win.
For upcoming matches, an "a" indicates there is an article about the rivalry between the two participants.

=== Rounds 23–33 ===
Home \ Away	BES	BSL	BUR	BYL	FLA	ILI	KAS	KOR	KUK	ORI	POG	SOP
Besa	—											
Besëlidhja		—										
Burreli			—									
Bylis				—								
Flamurtari					—							
Iliria						—						
Kastrioti							—					
Korabi								—				
Kukësi									—			
Oriku										—		
Pogradeci											—	
Sopoti												—

First match(es) will be played: 2027. Source:
Legend: Blue = home team win; Yellow = draw; Red = away team win.
For upcoming matches, an "a" indicates there is an article about the rivalry between the two participants.

=== Positions by round ===
The table lists the positions of teams after each week of matches.

Team ╲ Round	1	2	3	4	5	6	7	8	9	10	11	12	13	14	15	16	17	18	19	20	21	22	23	24	25	26	27	28	29	30	31	32	33
Iliria	9	3	4	4	7	5	4	1	1	1																							
Bylis	7	4	5	5	3	3	6	6	4	2																							
Kukësi	1	6	8	6	8	6	5	2	5	3																							
Besa	3	2	1	2	2	2	1	3	2	4																							
Pogradeci	10	5	2	1	1	1	2	4	6	5																							
Flamurtari	4	7	9	11	6	4	3	5	3	6																							
Besëlidhja	12	12	11	10	10	7	7	8	7	7																							
Korabi	2	1	3	3	5	8	9	7	9	8																							
Kastrioti	6	9	6	7	4	9	8	9	8	9	9																						
Sopoti	8	10	7	8	11	10	10	10	10	10	10																						
Burreli	5	8	10	9	9	11	11	11	11	11	11																						
Oriku	11	11	12	12	12	12	12	12	12	12	12																						

Leader and promotion to 2027−28 Kategoria Superiore
Promotion to 2027−28 Kategoria Superiore
Promotion play-off
Relegation play-off
Relegation to 2027–28 Kategoria e Dytë

== Top scorers ==
Rank	Player	Club	Goals
1	(England) Darnell Kithambo	Iliria	6
1	(Kosovo) Festim Alidema	Besëlidhja	6
1	(Lithuania) Manfredas Ruzgis	Besa	6
4	(Albania) Albi Xhabrahimi	Burreli	5
4	(Nigeria) Godswill Chinwendu	Pogradeci	5
6	(Albania) Ermir Spahiu	Besa	4
6	(Albania) Fatmir Prengaj	Besa	4
6	(Brazil) Matheus Alisson	Kukësi	4

== Notes and references ==
=== Notes ===
1. Kastrioti will play their 2026–27 home games at the Redi Maloku Stadium in Fushë-Krujë, since their venue, Kastrioti Stadium, is not suitable for Kategoria e Parë matches.
