= 1974–75 Kategoria e Dytë =

Kategoria e Dytë
- Season: 1974–75
- Champions: Luftëtari
- Promoted: Luftëtari
- Relegated: Korabi (withdraw); Tërbuni (withdraw); Përparimi; 10 Korriku; Bistrica (withdraw); 22 Tetori (withdraw); Gramozi

The 1974–75 Kategoria e Dytë was the 29th season of a second-tier association football league in Albania.

== Group A ==
1. Dajti (qualified to the championship playoffs)
2. Sopoti
3. Apolonia
4. Tekstilisti Stalin
5. Erzeni
6. 31 Korriku
7. Korabi (withdraw; relegated to the 1975–76 Kategoria e Tretë)
8. Tërbuni (withdraw; relegated to the 1975–76 Kategoria e Tretë)
9. Përparimi (relegated to the 1975–76 Kategoria e Tretë)
10. 10 Korriku (relegated to the 1975–76 Kategoria e Tretë)

== Group B ==
| Pos | Team | Pld | W | D | L | GF | GA | GD | Pts | Qualification or relegation |
|---|---|---|---|---|---|---|---|---|---|---|
| 1 | Luftëtari (C, P) | 18 | 16 | 1 | 1 | — | — | — | 33 | Qualification to the Promotion playoff |
| 2 | Tomori | 18 | 15 | 1 | 2 | — | — | — | 31 | |
| 3 | 24 Maji | 18 | 7 | 5 | 6 | — | — | — | 19 | |
| 4 | Minatori (T) | 18 | 5 | 8 | 5 | — | — | — | 18 | |
| 5 | Ylli i Kuq | 18 | 7 | 3 | 8 | — | — | — | 17 | |
| 6 | Bistrica (W) | 18 | 4 | 9 | 5 | — | — | — | 17 | Withdraw |
| 7 | Butrinti | 18 | 6 | 2 | 10 | — | — | — | 14 | |
| 8 | 22 Tetori (W) | 18 | 3 | 6 | 9 | — | — | — | 12 | Withdraw |
| 9 | Adriatiku Nartë | 18 | 3 | 4 | 11 | — | — | — | 10 | |
| 10 | Gramozi (R) | 18 | 2 | 5 | 11 | — | — | — | 9 | Relegation to 1975–76 Kategoria e Tretë |

(C) Champions; (P) Promoted; (R) Relegated; (W) Withdraw

== Championship/promotion playoff ==
| Team 1 | Score | Team 2 |
|---|---|---|
| Luftëtari | 4–3 | Dajti |

- Luftëtari was promoted to 1975–76 National Championship.
