= 1970–71 Kategoria e Dytë =

Kategoria e Dytë
- Season: 1970–71
- Champions: Shkëndija Tiranë
- Promoted: Shkëndija Tiranë; Studenti
- Relegated: None

The 1970–71 Kategoria e Dytë was the 25th season of a second-tier association football league in Albania.

== Group A ==
1. Studenti (promoted to the 1971–72 National Championship)
2. Tekstilisti Stalin
3. Ylli i Kuq
4. Korabi
5. Përparimi
6. Sopoti
7. 31 Korriku
8. 10 Korriku
9. 8 Nëntori
10. Tërbuni
11. Valbona
12. Minatori (Rr)
13. Adriatiku Nartë

== Group B ==
1. Shkëndija Tiranë (promoted to the 1971–72 National Championship)
2. Naftëtari
3. Erzeni
4. Punëtori
5. Gramozi
6. 5 Shtatori
7. Dajti
8. Butrinti
9. 22 Tetori
10. Shkumbini
11. Bistrica
12. Kastrioti
13. Minatori (T)
14. 24 Maji

== Championship final ==
Team 1	Score	Team 2
Shkëndija Tiranë	4–2	Studenti
