= 1971–72 Kategoria e Dytë =

Kategoria e Dytë
- Season: 1971–72
- Champions: Apolonia
- Promoted: Apolonia; Besëlidhja
- Relegated: Kastrioti (excluded); 8 Nëntori (excluded); Butrinti (excluded)

The 1971–72 Kategoria e Dytë was the 26th season of a second-tier association football league in Albania.

== Group A ==
Pos	Team	Pld	W	D	L	GF	GA	GD	Pts	Promotion or relegation
1	Besëlidhja (P)	24	17	6	1	59	11	+48	40	Promotion to 1972–73 National Championship
2	Dajti	24	16	4	4	49	19	+30	36	
3	31 Korriku	24	14	3	7	34	20	+14	31	
4	Tekstilisti Stalin	24	12	4	8	43	32	+11	28	
5	Kastrioti (D)	24	7	9	8	36	41	−5	23	Excluded from the league
6	Përparimi	24	9	5	10	40	52	−12	23	
7	8 Nëntori (D)	24	7	8	9	32	43	−11	22	Excluded from the league
8	Korabi	24	8	5	11	36	31	+5	21	
9	10 Korriku	24	8	5	11	32	35	−3	21	
10	Tërbuni	24	8	4	12	38	41	−3	20	
11	Minatori (Rr)	24	5	8	11	18	33	−15	18	
12	Sopoti	24	6	4	14	30	48	−18	16	
13	Valbona	24	4	5	15	14	55	−41	13	

(D) Disqualified; (P) Promoted

== Group B ==
Pos	Team	Pld	W	D	L	GF	GA	GD	Pts	Promotion or relegation
1	Apolonia (C, P)	26	17	7	2	39	17	+22	41	Promotion to 1972–73 National Championship
2	Erzeni	26	16	6	4	37	19	+18	38	
3	Punëtori	26	14	9	3	44	15	+29	37	
4	Naftëtari	26	16	5	5	49	22	+27	37	
5	Shkumbini	26	12	4	10	34	38	−4	28	
6	22 Tetori	26	10	7	9	41	38	+3	27	
7	Adriatiku Nartë	26	9	7	10	45	37	+8	25	
8	Butrinti (D)	26	10	4	12	43	37	+6	24	Excluded from the league
9	5 Shtatori	26	8	8	10	35	31	+4	24	
10	Ylli i Kuq	26	9	6	11	35	46	−11	24	
11	Gramozi	26	4	8	14	19	51	−32	16	
12	24 Maji	26	4	7	15	19	38	−19	15	
13	Minatori (T)	26	5	5	16	18	43	−25	15	
14	Bistrica	26	3	7	16	22	48	−26	13	

(C) Champions; (D) Disqualified; (P) Promoted

== Championship final ==
Team 1	Score	Team 2
Apolonia	3–0	Besëlidhja
