= 1975–76 Kategoria e Dytë =

Kategoria e Dytë
- Season: 1975–76
- Champions: Skënderbeu
- Promoted: Skënderbeu
- Relegated: Punëtori (withdraw); Adriatiku Nartë (withdraw); Tekstilisti Stalin (dissolved)

The 1975–76 Kategoria e Dytë was the 30th season of a second-tier association football league in Albania.

== Group A ==
Pos	Team	Pld	W	D	L	GF	GA	GD	Pts	Qualification or relegation
1	Skënderbeu (C, P)	14	9	4	1	45	6	+39	22	Qualification to the Promotion playoff
2	Punëtori (W)	14	4	7	3	14	13	+1	15	Withdraw
3	Erzeni	14	5	5	4	12	17	−5	15	
4	31 Korriku	14	4	6	4	19	19	0	14	
5	Besëlidhja	14	4	6	4	9	11	−2	14	
6	Ylli i Kuq	14	3	5	6	17	22	−5	11	
7	Sopoti	14	2	7	5	9	19	−10	11	
8	Tekstilisti Stalin (W)	14	1	8	5	9	27	−18	10	Dissolved after the season

(C) Champions; (P) Promoted; (W) Withdraw

== Group B ==
Pos	Team	Pld	W	D	L	GF	GA	GD	Pts	Qualification or relegation
1	Tomori	14	12	1	1	33	7	+26	25	Qualification to the Promotion playoff
2	24 Maji	14	6	4	4	18	17	+1	16	
3	Minatori (T)	14	5	4	5	17	19	−2	14	
4	Apolonia	14	3	7	4	17	15	+2	13	
5	Adriatiku Nartë (W)	14	4	4	6	15	19	−4	12	Withdraw
6	Vetëtima	14	5	1	8	14	23	−9	11	
7	Butrinti	14	5	1	8	18	28	−10	11	
8	Dajti	14	4	2	8	16	20	−4	10	

(W) Withdraw

== Championship/promotion playoff ==
Team 1	Score	Team 2
Skënderbeu	1–0	Tomori

- Skënderbeu was promoted to 1976–77 National Championship.
