= 1989–90 Kategoria e Dytë =

Kategoria e Dytë
- Season: 1989–90
- Champions: Traktori
- Promoted: Traktori; Kastrioti; Skënderbeu
- Relegated: None

The 1989–90 Kategoria e Dytë was the 43rd season of a second-tier association football league in Albania.

== Group A ==
Pos	Team	Pld	W	D	L	GF	GA	GD	Pts	Promotion
1	Kastrioti (P)	24	13	6	5	40	25	+15	32	Promotion to 1990–91 National Championship
2	Erzeni (Note: Erzeni was deducted 6 points.)	23	17	2	4	54	19	+35	30	
3	31 Korriku	24	14	2	8	41	22	+19	30	
4	Industriali (Note: Industriali was deducted 8 points.)	23	14	8	1	45	18	+27	28	
5	Korabi	24	10	8	6	37	26	+11	28	
6	Veleçiku	24	11	6	7	30	28	+2	28	
7	Dajti	24	10	7	7	31	22	+9	27	
8	Shkumbini	24	8	8	8	31	24	+7	24	
9	18 Shkurti	24	5	7	12	28	50	−22	17	
10	Përparimi (Note: Përparimi was deducted 1 point.)	24	5	7	12	29	40	−11	16	
11	Valbona	24	5	6	13	20	41	−21	16	
12	Tërbuni	24	6	1	17	30	58	−28	13	
13	Minatori (Rr)	24	1	4	19	17	63	−46	6	

(P) Promoted

== Group B ==
Pos	Team	Pld	W	D	L	GF	GA	GD	Pts	Promotion
1	Skënderbeu (P)	22	15	3	4	38	8	+30	33	Promotion to 1990–91 National Championship
2	Ylli i Kuq	22	10	7	5	31	19	+12	27	
3	Minatori (M)	22	11	5	6	31	26	+5	27	
4	Domozdova	22	11	4	7	32	24	+8	26	
5	Bistrica	22	10	5	7	37	18	+19	25	
6	24 Maji	22	9	7	6	24	19	+5	25	
7	Butrinti (Note: Butrinti was deducted 1 point.)	22	9	7	6	32	19	+13	24	
8	Gramozi	22	9	5	8	24	21	+3	23	
9	Minatori (T)	22	8	6	8	28	27	+1	22	
10	Devolli	22	2	9	11	16	29	−13	13	
11	Trebeshina	22	3	5	14	15	43	−28	11	
12	Melesini	22	2	3	17	13	68	−55	7	

(P) Promoted

== Group C ==
Pos	Team	Pld	W	D	L	GF	GA	GD	Pts	Promotion or relegation
1	Traktori (C, P)	23	12	8	3	40	25	+15	32	Promotion to 1990–91 National Championship
2	Punëtori	23	13	6	4	32	21	+11	32	
3	Vetëtima	23	13	3	7	42	27	+15	29	
4	21 Shkurti	23	11	5	7	32	20	+12	27	
5	Ballshi i Ri	23	10	7	6	27	18	+9	27	
6	5 Shtatori	23	12	3	8	27	19	+8	27	
7	Turbina	23	7	11	5	26	18	+8	25	
8	Studenti	23	9	7	7	21	18	+3	25	
9	Sopoti	23	9	5	9	30	32	−2	23	
10	Naftëtari	23	4	6	13	17	37	−20	14	
11	Vullneti	23	4	5	14	15	28	−13	13	
12	10 Korriku	23	3	3	17	15	52	−37	9	
13	22 Tetori (Note: 22 Tetori was withdraw after 11th round.)	12	2	1	9	11	28	−17	5	

(C) Champions; (P) Promoted

== Championship playoff ==
Team 1	Score	Team 2
Kastrioti	1–0	Skënderbeu
Traktori	1–0	Kastrioti
Traktori	1–1	Skënderbeu

Pos	Team	Pld	W	D	L	GF	GA	GD	Pts
1	Traktori (C)	2	1	1	0	2	1	+1	3
2	Kastrioti	2	1	0	1	1	1	0	2
3	Skënderbeu	2	0	1	1	1	2	−1	1

(C) Champions
