= Danladi =

- Gender: Male
- Language: Hausa

Origin
- Origin: Nigeria
- Meaning: Born on Sunday

Other names
- See also: Ladi

Danladi // is a masculine name of Hausa origins, Nigeria. It is directly translated into English as "born on a Sunday". So in line with its meaning, it is usually given to children born on a Sunday.

== Notable people with the name ==
- Sani Danladi, Nigerian politician
- Abu Danladi, Ghanaian footballer
- Musa Danladi Abubakar, Nigerian lawyer
- Salihu Yakubu-Danladi, Nigerian politician
- Danladi Umar, Nigerian judge
- Timothy Danladi, Nigerian international footballer
- Suleiman Danladi, Nigerian footballer
- Danladi Mohammed, Nigerian politician
- Dauda Danladi, former Nigerian ambassador
- Isaac Danladi, Nigerian cricketer
- Danladi Sanusi-Maiyamba, Nigerian monarch
- Sherif Danladi, Ghanaian footballer
