= 1954 Kategoria e Dytë =

Kategoria e Dytë
- Season: 1954
- Champions: Dinamo Shkodër
- Promoted: Dinamo Shkodër; Puna Gjirokastër; Puna Berat; Tekstilisti "Stalin" Yzberish

The 1954 Kategoria e Dytë was the 10th season of a second-tier Association football league in Albania. The season started in March and ended in August. The Second Division 1954 sees the participation of 48 teams divided into 8 groups, whose winners play the second phase in 2 groups of four. The first two classified play the final for the division title and are promoted together with the second of the two final groups, but instead of the team of the Physical Education Technical School Vojo Kushi from Tirana, the Tekstilisti "Stalin" Yzberish from the capital is admitted to the First Division. Dinamo Shkodër wins the division champion title by beating Puna Gjirokastër in the final.

== First round ==
=== Group 1 ===
Team	Location
Dinamo Shkodër	Shkodër
Spartaku Shkodër	Shkodër
?	?
?	?
?	?
?	?

Dinamo Shkodër won the group and advanced to the next round

=== Group 2 ===
Team	Location
Physical Education Technical School Vojo Kushi	Tirana
NBSh Ylli i Kuq Kamzë	Kamzë
Puna Peshkopi	Peshkopi, Dibër
Tekstilisti "Stalin" Yzberish	Tirana
Uzina "Traktori"	Tirana
?	?

Physical Education Technical School Vojo Kushi won the group and advanced to the next round

=== Group 3 ===
Team	Location
Puna Fier	Fier
Spartaku Fier	Fier
Spartaku Vlorë	Vlorë
?	?
?	?
?	?

Puna Fier won the group and advanced to the next round

=== Group 4 ===
Team	Location
Puna Peqin	Peqin
Kombinati i Drurit Elbasan	Elbasan
Puna Rrogozhinë	Rrogozhinë
?	?
?	?
?	?

Puna Peqin won the group and advanced to the next round

=== Group 5 ===
Team	Location
Puna Gjirokastër	Gjirokastër
Puna Përmet	Përmet
Puna Sarandë	Sarandë
Puna Tepelenë	Tepelena
?	?
?	?

Puna Gjirokastër won the group and advanced to the next round

=== Group 6 ===
Team	Location
Spartaku Pogradec	Pogradec
Puna Bilisht	Devoll, Korçë
Puna Ersekë	Ersekë
?	?
?	?
?	?

Spartaku Pogradec won the group and advanced to the next round

=== Group 7 ===
Team	Location
Puna Shijak	Shijak
?	?
?	?
?	?
?	?
?	?

Puna Shijak won the group and advanced to the next round

=== Group 8 ===
Team	Location
Puna Berat	Berat
Dinamo Berat	Berat
Puna Lushnjë	Lushnja
Puna Patos	Patos
Spartaku Qyteti Stalin	Kuçovë
Spartaku Berat	Berat

Puna Berat won the group and advanced to the next round

== Second round ==
=== Group 1 ===
Pos	Team	Pld	W	D	L	GF	GA	GD	Pts	Qualification
1	Dinamo Shkodër (Q)	6	5	1	0	0	0	0	11	Qualification to the final
2	PETS Vojo Kushi (Note: instead of the team of the Physical Education Technical School Vojo Kushi from Tirana, the Tekstilisti "Stalin" Yzberish from the capital is admitted to the First Division.)	6	4	1	1	0	0	0	9	Promotion to 1955 National Championship
3	Puna Peqin	6	2	0	4	0	0	0	4	
4	Puna Shijak	6	0	0	6	0	0	0	0	

(Q) Qualified for the phase indicated

=== Group 2 ===
Pos	Team	Pld	W	D	L	GF	GA	GD	Pts	Qualification
1	Puna Gjirokastër (Q)	6	4	0	2	0	0	0	8	Qualification to the final
2	Puna Berat	6	3	1	2	0	0	0	7	Promotion to 1955 National Championship
3	Spartaku Pogradec	6	2	1	3	0	0	0	5	
4	Puna Fier	6	2	0	4	0	0	0	4	

(Q) Qualified for the phase indicated

== Final ==
Single match played in Durrës.

Team 1	Score	Team 2
Dinamo Shkodër	2–1	Puna Gjirokastër

- Dinamo Shkodër, Puna Gjirokastër, Puna Berat and Tekstilisti "Stalin" Yzberish were promoted to 1955 National Championship.
