= 2018–19 Kategoria e Parë =

Kategoria e Parë
- Season: 2018–19
- Champions: Bylis; 4th title
- Promoted: Bylis; Vllaznia
- Relegated: Tomori; Vora
- Matches: 245
- Goals: 591 (2.41 per match)
- Biggest home win: Erzeni 5−0 Shënkolli (3 November 2018)
- Biggest away win: Vora 1−6 Vllaznia (16 February 2019)
- Highest scoring: Burreli 5−2 Veleçiku (16 February 2019); Bylis 5−2 Egnatia (30 March 2019); Oriku 4−3 Egnatia (18 May 2019); Vora 1−6 Vllaznia (16 February 2019)
- Longest winning run: 14 matches Bylis
- Longest unbeaten run: 23 matches Bylis
- Longest winless run: 11 matches Erzeni; Tomori
- Longest losing run: 7 matches Turbina

The 2018–19 Kategoria e Parë was the 71st official season of the Albanian football second division since its establishment. The season began on 9 September 2018 and ended on 25 May 2019. There were 20 teams competing this season, split in 2 groups, each with 10 teams. The top 5 teams from each group qualified to the promotion round, while the last teams qualified to the relegation round. The 2 winners of the qualification round gained promotion to the 2019–20 Kategoria Superiore, and played the division's final against each other. Bylis and Vllaznia were promoted to the 2019–20 Kategoria Superiore. Tomori and Vora were relegated to the 2019−20 Kategoria e Dytë. Bylis won their fourth Kategoria e Parë title on 23 May 2019 after beating Vllaznia in the final match.

== Changes from last season ==
=== Team changes ===
==== From Kategoria e Parë ====
Promoted to Kategoria Superiore:

- Kastrioti
- Tirana

Relegated to Kategoria e Dytë:

- Naftëtari
- Shkumbini
- Tërbuni
- Vllaznia B

==== To Kategoria e Parë ====
Relegated from Kategoria Superiore:

- Lushnja
- Vllaznia

Promoted from Kategoria e Dytë:

- Elbasani
- Oriku
- Veleçiku
- Vora

=== Locations ===
2018–19 Group A Kategoria e Parë teams.
2018–19 Group B Kategoria e Parë teams.

=== Stadia by capacity and locations ===
==== Group A ====
Team	Location	Stadium	Capacity
Besëlidhja	Lezhë	Brian Filipi Stadium	5,000
Dinamo Tirana	Tirana	Internacional Complex	1,000
Burreli	Burrel	Liri Ballabani Stadium	2,500
Erzeni	Shijak	Tofik Jashari Stadium	4,000
Iliria	Fushë-Krujë	Redi Maloku Stadium	3,000
Korabi	Peshkopi	Korabi Stadium	6,000
Shënkolli	Shënkoll	Shënkoll Stadium	
Veleçiku	Koplik	Kompleksi Vellezërit Duli	2,000
Vllaznia	Shkodër	Loro Boriçi Stadium	16,000
Vora	Vorë	Fusha Sportive Vorë	1,000

==== Group B ====
Team	Location	Stadium	Capacity
Apolonia	Fier	Loni Papuçiu Stadium	6,800
Besa	Kavajë	Besa Stadium	8,000
Bylis	Ballsh	Adush Muça Stadium	5,200
Egnatia	Rrogozhinë	Egnatia Stadium	4,000
Elbasani	Elbasan	Elbasan Arena	12,800
Lushnja	Lushnjë	Abdurrahman Roza Haxhiu Stadium	8,500
Oriku	Orikum	Petro Ruci Stadium	2,000
Pogradeci	Pogradec	Gjorgji Kyçyku Stadium	10,700
Tomori	Berat	Tomori Stadium	14,750
Turbina	Cërrik	Nexhip Trungu Stadium	6,600

== First phase ==
=== Group A ===
Pos	Team	Pld	W	D	L	GF	GA	GD	Pts	Qualification
1	Vllaznia	18	14	2	2	32	8	+24	44	Qualification to the Promotion round
2	Erzeni	18	10	2	6	24	15	+9	32	Qualification to the Promotion round
3	Besëlidhja	18	9	3	6	22	16	+6	30	Qualification to the Promotion round
4	Dinamo Tirana	18	8	3	7	15	11	+4	27	Qualification to the Promotion round
5	Korabi	18	8	3	7	18	19	−1	27	Qualification to the Promotion round
6	Veleçiku	18	8	1	9	18	23	−5	25	Qualification to the Relegation round
7	Burreli	18	8	0	10	18	23	−5	24	Qualification to the Relegation round
8	Shënkolli	18	6	2	10	14	23	−9	20	Qualification to the Relegation round
9	Iliria	18	5	4	9	17	19	−2	19	Qualification to the Relegation round
10	Vora	18	2	4	12	11	32	−21	10	Qualification to the Relegation round

Source: Soccerway
Rules for classification: 1) points; 2) goal difference; 3) number of goals scored; 4) head-to-head points; 5) head-to-head goal difference; 6) draw. (Head-to-head record is applied for clubs with the same number of points only once all matches between said clubs have been played.)

=== Group B ===
Pos	Team	Pld	W	D	L	GF	GA	GD	Pts	Qualification
1	Bylis	18	13	3	2	30	7	+23	42	Qualification to the Promotion round
2	Besa	18	10	5	3	22	11	+11	35	Qualification to the Promotion round
3	Egnatia	18	10	1	7	23	21	+2	31	Qualification to the Promotion round
4	Lushnja	18	7	6	5	19	14	+5	27	Qualification to the Promotion round
5	Oriku	18	7	6	5	17	14	+3	27	Qualification to the Promotion round
6	Pogradeci	18	8	2	8	24	19	+5	26	Qualification to the Relegation round
7	Apolonia	18	6	5	7	13	11	+2	23	Qualification to the Relegation round
8	Tomori (Note: Tomori were deducted three points after failing to show up in a match against Bylis.)	18	5	5	8	17	25	−8	17	Qualification to the Relegation round
9	Elbasani	18	3	3	12	14	32	−18	12	Qualification to the Relegation round
10	Turbina	18	2	2	14	11	36	−25	8	Qualification to the Relegation round

Source: Soccerway
Rules for classification: 1) points; 2) goal difference; 3) number of goals scored; 4) head-to-head points; 5) head-to-head goal difference; 6) draw. (Head-to-head record is applied for clubs with the same number of points only once all matches between said clubs have been played.)

== Second phase ==
=== Promotion round ===
==== Group A ====
Pos	Team	Pld	W	D	L	GF	GA	GD	Pts	Promotion
1	Vllaznia (P)	8	6	1	1	44	11	+33	41	Promotion to 2019–20 Kategoria Superiore
2	Dinamo Tirana	8	4	2	2	26	17	+9	28	
3	Besëlidhja	8	3	4	1	31	25	+6	28	
4	Korabi	8	1	2	5	23	28	−5	19	
5	Erzeni	8	0	3	5	27	28	−1	19	

Source: Soccerway
Rules for classification: 1) points; 2) goal difference; 3) number of goals scored; 4) head-to-head points; 5) head-to-head goal difference; 6) draw. (Head-to-head record is applied for clubs with the same number of points only once all matches between said clubs have been played.)
(P) Promoted

==== Group B ====
Pos	Team	Pld	W	D	L	GF	GA	GD	Pts	Promotion
1	Bylis (C, P)	8	8	0	0	52	10	+42	45	Promotion to 2019–20 Kategoria Superiore
2	Besa	8	4	1	3	34	25	+9	31	
3	Oriku	8	3	2	3	29	27	+2	25	
4	Lushnja	8	1	4	3	27	28	−1	21	
5	Egnatia	8	0	1	7	34	42	−8	17	

Source: Soccerway
Rules for classification: 1) points; 2) goal difference; 3) number of goals scored; 4) head-to-head points; 5) head-to-head goal difference; 6) draw. (Head-to-head record is applied for clubs with the same number of points only once all matches between said clubs have been played.)
(C) Champions; (P) Promoted

=== Relegation round ===
==== Group A ====
Pos	Team	Pld	W	D	L	GF	GA	GD	Pts	Relegation
6	Burreli	8	4	1	3	25	29	−4	25	
7	Iliria	8	4	2	2	27	29	−2	24	
8	Shënkolli	8	4	1	3	29	36	−7	23	
9	Veleçiku (O)	8	3	1	4	26	32	−6	23	Play-out relegation to 2019–20 Kategoria e Dytë
10	Vora (R)	8	2	1	5	21	44	−23	12	Relegation to 2019–20 Kategoria e Dytë

Source: Soccerway
Rules for classification: 1) points; 2) goal difference; 3) number of goals scored; 4) head-to-head points; 5) head-to-head goal difference; 6) draw. (Head-to-head record is applied for clubs with the same number of points only once all matches between said clubs have been played.)
(O) Play-off winners; (R) Relegated

==== Group B ====
Pos	Team	Pld	W	D	L	GF	GA	GD	Pts	Relegation
6	Pogradeci	8	5	0	3	36	29	+7	28	
7	Apolonia	8	4	1	3	26	18	+8	25	
8	Turbina	8	5	0	3	25	43	−18	19	
9	Elbasani (O)	8	4	1	3	23	44	−21	19	Play-out relegation to 2019–20 Kategoria e Dytë
10	Tomori (R)	8	0	2	6	22	42	−20	11	Relegation to 2019–20 Kategoria e Dytë

Source: Soccerway
Rules for classification: 1) points; 2) goal difference; 3) number of goals scored; 4) head-to-head points; 5) head-to-head goal difference; 6) draw. (Head-to-head record is applied for clubs with the same number of points only once all matches between said clubs have been played.)
(O) Play-off winners; (R) Relegated

== Final ==
23 May 2019
16:00

Vllaznia	1−3	Bylis
Ignat 17'		Anthony 48'; Bajramaj 61'; Ujka 83'

Niko Dovana Stadium, Durrës
Referee: Juxhin Xhaja

== Relegation play-offs ==
24 May 2019
16:00

Veleçiku	1−0 (a.e.t.)	Shkumbini
Lami 111'

Tofik Jashari Stadium, Shijak

24 May 2019
16:00

Elbasani	3−0	Luzi 2008
Jaupi 45' (pen.); Mici 65'; Ferhati 90+2'

Adush Muça Stadium, Ballsh

== Extra play−off match ==
30 May 2019
14:00

Shkumbini	1–0	Luzi 2008
Xhyra 33'

Loni Papuçiu Stadium, Fier

An extra play−off match was played between the losers of the regular play−offs to replace the vacant spot left by Kamza, who was relegated from the Kategoria Superiore to the Kategoria e Dytë by federation decision.
