= Jurgersi Liçkollari =

Albanian footballer

Personal information
- Full name: Jugers Liçkollari
- Date of birth: 24 March 1998 (age 28)
- Place of birth: Pogradec, Albania
- Position: Midfielder

Team information
- Current team: Pogradeci

Youth career
- 2011–: Pogradeci

Senior career*
Years	Team	Apps	(Gls)
2015–2018	Pogradeci	68	(4)
2018	Bylis	11	(2)
2019–	Pogradeci	12	(1)

International career
2015–	Albania U-19	3	(0)
- * Club domestic league appearances and goals as of 22 May 2019

Jugersi Liçkollari (born 24 March 1998 in Pogradeci) is an Albanian professional footballer who plays for Pogradeci in the Albanian First Division.
