= 1990–91 Kategoria e Dytë =

Kategoria e Dytë
- Season: 1990–91
- Champions: Ylli i Kuq
- Promoted: Ylli i Kuq; Selenica; Laçi
- Relegated: 8 Nëntori; Tërbuni; Bulqiza; Minatori (Rr); Prrenjasi; Rrogozhina; Gramshi; Vetëtima; Devolli; Leskoviku

The 1990–91 Kategoria e Dytë was the 44th season of a second-tier association football league in Albania.

== Group A ==
Pos	Team	Pld	W	D	L	GF	GA	GD	Pts	Promotion or relegation
1	Laçi (P)	24	18	2	4	45	15	+30	38	Promotion to 1991–92 National Championship
2	Korabi	23	14	4	5	42	17	+25	32	
3	Dajti	24	15	1	8	34	15	+19	31	
4	Shkumbini	24	14	2	8	32	15	+17	30	
5	Kukësi	24	13	4	7	37	25	+12	30	
6	31 Korriku	24	12	5	7	31	27	+4	29	
7	Kopliku	23	9	6	8	31	24	+7	24	
8	Valbona	23	9	6	8	27	25	+2	24	
9	Erzeni	24	10	4	10	21	21	0	24	
10	8 Nëntori (R)	24	6	7	11	23	40	−17	19	Relegation to 1991–92 Kategoria e Tretë
11	Tërbuni (R)	23	5	4	14	18	47	−29	14	Relegation to 1991–92 Kategoria e Tretë
12	Bulqiza (R)	24	3	3	18	13	39	−26	9	Relegation to 1991–92 Kategoria e Tretë
13	Minatori (Rr) (R)	24	0	4	20	14	58	−44	4	Relegation to 1991–92 Kategoria e Tretë

(P) Promoted; (R) Relegated

== Group B ==
Pos	Team	Pld	W	D	L	GF	GA	GD	Pts	Promotion or relegation
1	Selenica (P)	22	15	1	6	71	25	+46	31	Promotion to 1991–92 National Championship
2	Naftëtari	22	14	3	5	57	18	+39	31	
3	Punëtori	22	13	3	6	55	26	+29	29	
4	Ballshi	22	11	5	6	27	29	−2	27	
5	Besëlidhja	22	11	3	8	42	31	+11	25	
6	Sopoti	22	10	5	7	27	20	+7	25	
7	5 Shtatori	22	9	4	9	24	27	−3	22	
8	Cërriku	22	9	3	10	30	21	+9	21	
9	Poliçani	22	8	5	9	30	48	−18	21	
10	Prrenjasi (R)	22	5	5	12	21	38	−17	15	Relegation to 1991–92 Kategoria e Tretë
11	Rrogozhina (R)	22	5	5	12	13	42	−29	15	Relegation to 1991–92 Kategoria e Tretë
12	Gramshi (R)	22	0	2	20	5	77	−72	2	Relegation to 1991–92 Kategoria e Tretë

(P) Promoted; (R) Relegated

== Group C ==
Pos	Team	Pld	W	D	L	GF	GA	GD	Pts	Promotion or relegation
1	Ylli i Kuq (C, P)	22	16	2	4	48	19	+29	34	Promotion to 1991–92 National Championship
2	Butrinti	22	14	2	6	50	18	+32	30	
3	Tepelena	22	13	3	6	41	21	+20	29	
4	Minatori (M)	22	12	3	7	41	24	+17	27	
5	Delvina	22	11	3	8	37	22	+15	25	
6	24 Maji	22	10	5	7	25	21	+4	25	
7	Studenti	22	8	8	6	38	26	+12	24	
8	Vetëtima (R)	22	7	4	11	29	38	−9	18	Relegation to 1991–92 Kategoria e Tretë
9	Gramozi	22	5	6	11	22	44	−22	16	
10	Këlcyra (R)	22	4	5	13	27	43	−16	13	Relegation to 1991–92 Kategoria e Tretë
11	Devolli (R)	22	3	6	13	17	61	−44	12	Relegation to 1991–92 Kategoria e Tretë
12	Leskoviku (R)	22	5	1	16	19	57	−38	11	Relegation to 1991–92 Kategoria e Tretë

(C) Champions; (P) Promoted; (R) Relegated

== Championship playoff ==
Team 1	Score	Team 2
Ylli i Kuq	1–0	Laçi
Selenica	2–1	Laçi
Ylli i Kuq	3–1	Selenica

Pos	Team	Pld	W	D	L	GF	GA	GD	Pts
1	Ylli i Kuq (C)	2	2	0	0	4	1	+3	4
2	Selenica	2	1	0	1	3	4	−1	2
3	Laçi	2	0	0	2	1	3	−2	0

(C) Champions
