= 1976–77 Kategoria e Dytë =

Kategoria e Dytë
- Season: 1976–77
- Champions: Tomori
- Promoted: Tomori
- Relegated: Shkumbini; Minatori (Rr)

The 1976–77 Kategoria e Dytë was the 31st season of a second-tier association football league in Albania.

== Group A ==
| Pos | Team | Pld | W | D | L | GF | GA | GD | Pts | Qualification or relegation |
|---|---|---|---|---|---|---|---|---|---|---|
| 1 | Tomori (C, P) | 14 | 9 | 5 | 0 | 25 | 8 | +17 | 23 | Qualification to the Promotion playoff |
| 2 | Naftëtari | 14 | 5 | 7 | 2 | 20 | 15 | +5 | 17 | |
| 3 | Minatori | 14 | 5 | 3 | 6 | 21 | 22 | −1 | 13 | |
| 4 | Erzeni | 14 | 4 | 4 | 6 | 19 | 16 | +3 | 12 | |
| 5 | 5 Shtatori | 14 | 1 | 10 | 3 | 10 | 11 | −1 | 12 | |
| 6 | Ylli i Kuq | 14 | 3 | 6 | 5 | 11 | 16 | −5 | 12 | |
| 7 | Sopoti | 14 | 5 | 2 | 7 | 17 | 26 | −9 | 12 | |
| 8 | Shkumbini (R) | 14 | 3 | 5 | 6 | 14 | 23 | −9 | 11 | Relegation to 1977–78 Kategoria e Tretë |

(C) Champions; (P) Promoted; (R) Relegated

== Group B ==
| Pos | Team | Pld | W | D | L | GF | GA | GD | Pts | Qualification or relegation |
|---|---|---|---|---|---|---|---|---|---|---|
| 1 | Besëlidhja | 14 | 8 | 5 | 1 | 22 | 8 | +14 | 21 | Qualification to the Promotion playoff |
| 2 | Butrinti | 14 | 8 | 1 | 5 | 18 | 24 | −6 | 17 | |
| 3 | Apolonia | 14 | 5 | 5 | 4 | 21 | 16 | +5 | 15 | |
| 4 | Dajti Kamëz | 14 | 3 | 8 | 3 | 14 | 13 | +1 | 14 | |
| 5 | 31 Korriku | 14 | 5 | 3 | 6 | 15 | 14 | +1 | 13 | |
| 6 | 24 Maji | 14 | 2 | 8 | 4 | 21 | 16 | +5 | 12 | |
| 7 | Vetëtima | 14 | 5 | 2 | 7 | 10 | 20 | −10 | 12 | |
| 8 | Minatori (Rr) (R) | 14 | 2 | 4 | 8 | 12 | 22 | −10 | 8 | Relegation to 1977–78 Kategoria e Tretë |

(R) Relegated

== Championship/promotion playoff ==
| Team 1 | Agg. | Team 2 | 1st leg | 2nd leg |
|---|---|---|---|---|
| Besëlidhja | 1–3 | Tomori | 1–0 | 0–3 (a.e.t.) |

- Tomori was promoted to 1977–78 National Championship.
