= 1981–82 Kategoria e Dytë =

Kategoria e Dytë
- Season: 1981–82
- Champions: Traktori
- Promoted: Traktori; Skënderbeu
- Relegated: Sopoti; Ylli i Kuq

The 1981–82 Kategoria e Dytë was the 35th season of a second-tier association football league in Albania.

== League table ==
Pos	Team	Pld	W	D	L	GF	GA	GD	Pts	Promotion or relegation
1	Traktori (C, P)	26	15	6	5	44	19	+25	36	Promotion to 1982–83 National Championship
2	Skënderbeu (P)	26	13	10	3	37	12	+25	36	Promotion to 1982–83 National Championship
3	Shkëndija Tiranë	26	11	11	4	32	22	+10	33	
4	Apolonia	26	11	9	6	32	21	+11	31	
5	Minatori (T)	26	9	9	8	30	32	−2	27	
6	Kastrioti	26	10	6	10	27	25	+2	26	
7	Erzeni	26	8	9	9	18	25	−7	25	
8	Tërbuni	26	9	5	12	25	31	−6	23	
9	Vetëtima	26	7	8	11	32	37	−5	22	
10	Shkumbini	26	7	8	11	23	33	−10	22	
11	5 Shtatori	26	6	10	10	21	32	−11	22	
12	Butrinti	26	7	7	12	26	33	−7	21	
13	Sopoti (R)	26	8	4	14	26	37	−11	20	Relegation to 1982–83 Kategoria e Tretë
14	Ylli i Kuq (R)	26	4	12	10	15	29	−14	20	Relegation to 1982–83 Kategoria e Tretë

(C) Champions; (P) Promoted; (R) Relegated
