= 1985–86 Kategoria e Dytë =

Kategoria e Dytë
- Season: 1985–86
- Champions: Besa
- Promoted: Besa; Skënderbeu
- Relegated: Sopoti; Minatori (T)

The 1985–86 Kategoria e Dytë was the 39th season of a second-tier association football league in Albania.

== League table ==
Pos	Team	Pld	W	D	L	GF	GA	GD	Pts	Promotion or relegation
1	Besa (C, P)	26	15	5	6	43	22	+21	35	Promotion to 1986–87 National Championship
2	Skënderbeu (P)	26	15	5	6	35	14	+21	35	Promotion to 1986–87 National Championship
3	Korabi	26	13	5	8	28	25	+3	31	
4	24 Maji	26	10	7	9	35	20	+15	27	
5	Ylli i Kuq	26	8	10	8	28	27	+1	26	
6	31 Korriku	26	10	5	11	31	29	+2	25	
7	Shkumbini	26	10	5	11	26	30	−4	25	
8	Kastrioti	26	10	4	12	25	24	+1	24	
9	Erzeni	26	10	4	12	30	32	−2	24	
10	Vetëtima	26	10	4	12	31	35	−4	24	
11	Butrinti	26	9	6	11	27	37	−10	24	
12	5 Shtatori	26	8	8	10	22	33	−11	24	
13	Sopoti (R)	26	8	6	12	25	40	−15	22	Relegation to 1986–87 Kategoria e Tretë
14	Minatori (T) (R)	26	5	8	13	22	40	−18	18	Relegation to 1986–87 Kategoria e Tretë

(C) Champions; (P) Promoted; (R) Relegated
