= 1975–76 Albanian National Championship =

Albanian National Championship
- Season: 1975–76
- Champions: Dinamo Tirana; 11th Albanian title
- Relegated: Naftëtari
- European Cup: None
- UEFA Cup: None
- Cup Winners' Cup: None
- Matches: 132
- Goals: 260 (1.97 per match)
- Top goalscorer: Ilir Përnaska (18 goals)

The 1975–76 Albanian National Championship was the 37th season of the Albanian National Championship, the top professional league for association football clubs, since its establishment in 1930.

== Overview ==
It was contested by 12 teams, and Dinamo Tirana won the championship.

== League table ==
| Pos | Team | Pld | W | D | L | GF | GA | GD | Pts | Qualification or relegation |
|---|---|---|---|---|---|---|---|---|---|---|
| 1 | Dinamo Tirana (C) | 22 | 11 | 6 | 5 | 44 | 22 | +22 | 28 | Champions |
| 2 | 17 Nëntori | 22 | 8 | 10 | 4 | 29 | 18 | +11 | 26 | |
| 3 | Vllaznia | 22 | 10 | 5 | 7 | 34 | 27 | +7 | 25 | |
| 4 | Besa | 22 | 5 | 13 | 4 | 20 | 18 | +2 | 23 | |
| 5 | Partizani | 22 | 6 | 11 | 5 | 15 | 16 | −1 | 23 | |
| 6 | Flamurtari | 22 | 8 | 6 | 8 | 17 | 20 | −3 | 22 | |
| 7 | Shkëndija Tiranë | 22 | 6 | 8 | 8 | 18 | 18 | 0 | 20 | |
| 8 | Labinoti | 22 | 5 | 10 | 7 | 17 | 22 | −5 | 20 | |
| 9 | Lokomotiva Durrës | 22 | 7 | 6 | 9 | 13 | 24 | −11 | 20 | |
| 10 | Luftëtari | 22 | 7 | 5 | 10 | 19 | 23 | −4 | 19 | |
| 11 | Traktori | 22 | 7 | 5 | 10 | 17 | 24 | −7 | 19 | |
| 12 | Naftëtari (R) | 22 | 5 | 9 | 8 | 17 | 28 | −11 | 19 | Relegation to the 1976–77 Kategoria e Dytë |

Source: RSSSF.org
(C) Champions; (R) Relegated

Note: '17 Nëntori' is Tirana, 'Labinoti' is Elbasani, 'Lokomotiva Durrës' is Teuta, 'Traktori' is Lushnja

== Results ==
| Home \ Away | 17N | BES | DIN | FLA | LAB | LOK | LUF | NAF | PAR | SHK | TRA | VLL |
|---|---|---|---|---|---|---|---|---|---|---|---|---|
| 17 Nëntori | | 0–0 | 2–1 | 3–0 | 3–0 | 4–0 | 2–1 | 3–1 | 0–2 | 1–0 | 1–1 | 3–2 |
| Besa | 0–0 | | 1–1 | 2–1 | 0–0 | 2–0 | 1–0 | 0–0 | 1–1 | 0–1 | 1–0 | 3–1 |
| Dinamo | 2–2 | 1–1 | | 3–1 | 3–1 | 3–0 | 2–0 | 5–0 | 4–1 | 2–0 | 4–0 | 1–0 |
| Flamurtari | 0–0 | 1–1 | 2–0 | | 1–0 | 2–0 | 1–0 | 0–0 | 0–0 | 2–1 | 1–0 | 2–1 |
| Labinoti | 1–0 | 1–1 | 2–1 | 1–0 | | 1–0 | 1–0 | 0–0 | 0–0 | 1–1 | 0–1 | 0–0 |
| Lokomotiva | 0–0 | 1–0 | 1–0 | 0–0 | 0–0 | | 1–1 | 1–0 | 1–0 | 0–0 | 2–1 | 1–0 |
| Luftëtari | 1–1 | 2–1 | 1–1 | 0–1 | 2–1 | 1–0 | | 0–1 | 1–0 | 1–0 | 2–1 | 2–0 |
| Naftëtari | 0–0 | 2–2 | 2–5 | 0–0 | 2–2 | 1–0 | 4–2 | | 0–0 | 1–1 | 2–1 | 0–1 |
| Partizani | 3–2 | 1–1 | 0–0 | 1–0 | 2–1 | 0–0 | 1–1 | 1–0 | | 1–0 | 0–0 | 1–1 |
| Shkëndija | 0–0 | 0–0 | 1–2 | 2–0 | 1–1 | 4–2 | 0–0 | 2–0 | 1–0 | | 1–0 | 1–2 |
| Traktori | 1–0 | 2–0 | 1–1 | 2–0 | 2–1 | 1–2 | 1–0 | 1–0 | 0–0 | 1–1 | | 0–1 |
| Vllaznia | 2–2 | 2–2 | 3–0 | 3–2 | 2–2 | 3–1 | 2–1 | 2–0 | 2–0 | 1–0 | 4–0 | |

Source: CalcioMondialeWeb.it
Legend: Blue = home team win; Yellow = draw; Red = away team win.
