= 1950 Kategoria e Dytë =

Kategoria e Dytë
- Season: 1950
- Champions: Berati
- Promoted: Berati, NBSh Shijak (Note: NBSh Shijak were promoted but they gave up their place in the 1951 National Championship.)
- Matches played: 54
- Goals scored: 152 (2.81 per match)
- Top goalscorer: (Note: There are 11 matches with missing results meaning there were more than 152 goals scored.)
- Biggest home win: NBSh Ylli Kuq Kamëz 8–0 Tekstilisti Stalin
- Biggest away win: Selenica 0–3 Narta; 24 Maji Përmet 2–5 Berati; Himara 0–3 Berati
- Highest scoring: Berati 9–2 24 Maji Përmet

The 1950 Kategoria e Dytë is the seventh season of the second tier of football in Albania. The season started on 30 April and finished on 30 June, and 32 teams competed in a Single-elimination tournament with four teams qualifying for the final group, where Berati won the competition for the second time and NBSh Shijak finished as runners up.

== First round ==
Team 1	Agg.	Team 2	1st leg	2nd leg
Kukësi	4–0	Gora	3–0	1–0
Kopliku	5–3	Puka	4–3	1–0
Rrësheni	6–2	Rubiku	2–1	4–1
Shkozeti	2–3	NBSh Shijak	1–1	1–2
NBSh Ylli Kuq Kamëz	8–2	Tekstilisti Stalin	8–0	0–2
Peqini	2–1	KK Lushnjë	2–1	—
Lushnja	5–1	Patosi	5–1	—
Spartaku Kuçovë	2–6	Berati	2–2	0–4
24 Maji Përmet	1–0	Tepelena	1–0	0–0
Narta	4–0	Selenica	1–0	3–0
Himara	(Note: The results of these games are unknown, but the sides in bold won their respective ties and advanced to the second round.)	Qeparo	?	?
Delvina	3–2	Saranda	1–0	2–2
Gjirokastra	?	Deriçani	?	?
Leskoviku	2–3	Erseka	2–1	0–2
Bilishti		Hoçishti	?	?
Peshkopia		Bulqiza	?	?

== Second round ==
Team 1	Agg.	Team 2	1st leg	2nd leg
Kopliku	2–1	Kukësi (Note: Kopliku won the first leg 2–1 but were disqualified from the competition for fielding an illegible player, meaning Kukësi advanced to the third round.)	2–1	—
NBSh Shijak	9–3	Rrësheni	7–2	2–1
Berati	14–4	24 Maji Përmet	9–2	5–2
Gjirokastra	3–0	Delvina (Note: Delvina withdrew from the competition following a 3–0 first leg loss, meaning Gjirokastra advanced to the third round.)	3–0	—
Erseka	6–1	Bilishti	4–0	2–1
NBSh Ylli Kuq Kamëz	(Note: Peshkopia withdrew from the competition before the first leg, meaning NBSh Ylli Kuq Kamëz advanced to the third round.)	Peshkopia	—	—
Lushnja	6–1	Peqini	4–1	2–0
Himara	(Note: Narta withdrew from the competition before the first leg, meaning Himara advanced to the third round.)	Narta	—	—

== Third round ==
Team 1	Agg.	Team 2	1st leg	2nd leg
Berati	7–0	Himara	4–0	3–0
NBSh Shijak	4–2	Kukësi	3–2	1–0
Erseka	1–0	Kukësi	0–0	1–0
Lushnja	4–5	NBSh Ylli Kuq Kamëz	2–3	2–2

== Final round ==
Berati	5–0	Erseka	Berat

NBSh Shijak	(Note: The results of three matches in the final group are missing.)	NBSh Ylli Kuq Kamëz	Berat

Berati	4–0	NBSh Ylli Kuq Kamëz	Berat

Erseka	NBSh Shijak	Berat

Berati	2–1	NBSh Shijak	Berat

NBSh Ylli Kuq Kamëz	Erseka	Berat

Berati, NBSh Shijak, Erseka and NBSh Ylli Kuq Kamëz competed in the final group to determine the winner of the 1950 Kategoria e Dytë. The matches were played in Berat between 25–30 June 1950 and Berati came out winners with after winning all three games in the final group, with NBSh Shijak

finishing as runners up.
