= 1930 in Albanian football =

Football in Albania
- Season: 1930

Men's football
- Albanian National Championship: Tirana
- Kategoria e Dytë: Muzaka Berat

The 1930 season was the first competitive association football season in Albania. The Albanian Football Federation was formed on 6 June 1930, leading to the formation of two leagues played in the 1930 season.

== League competitions ==
=== Albanian National Championship ===
The 1930 Albanian National Championship season began on 6 April and ended on 6 July. Tirana and Skënderbeu finished in the top two qualifying for the championship play-offs. Tirana won the play-offs and became the inaugural champions of Albania following two technical victories over Skënderbeu in the championship playoffs, taking their seasonal total to seven wins, four draws and one loss.

Pos	Team	Pld	W	D	L	GF	GA	GR	Pts	Qualification
1	Tirana (C)	10	5	4	1	17	7	2.429	14	Qualification for the championship play-off
2	Skënderbeu	10	5	4	1	14	5	2.800	14	Qualification for the championship play-off
3	Bashkimi Shkodran	10	4	5	1	20	14	1.429	13	
4	Teuta	10	3	2	5	12	17	0.706	8	
5	Urani	10	3	1	6	9	20	0.450	7	
6	Sportklub Vlora	10	1	2	7	4	13	0.308	4	

Source: RSSSF.org
Rules for classification: 1) points; 2) goal difference; 3) number of goals scored.
(C) Champions

=== Kategoria e Dytë ===
Muzaka Berat were champions in the inaugural edition of the second-tier league and was promoted.

Pos	Team	Pld	W	D	L	GF	GA	GD	Pts
1	Muzaka Berat (P)	8	7	1	0	n/a	n/a	—	15
2	Bardhyli Lezhë	8	4	2	2	n/a	n/a	—	10
3	Shqiponja Gjirokastër	8	3	1	4	n/a	n/a	—	7
4	SK Fieri	8	2	2	4	n/a	n/a	—	6
5	Kongresi Lushnjë (Note: Did not relegate)	8	0	1	7	n/a	n/a	—	1

(P) Promoted
