= Enkelejd Pengu =

Albanian footballer

Personal information
- Full name: Enkelejd Pengu
- Date of birth: 23 May 1986 (age 40)
- Place of birth: Pogradec, Albania
- Position: Forward

Youth career
- 2004–2005: Pogradeci

Senior career*
Years	Team	Apps	(Gls)
- ?
2008–2011	Pogradeci	57	(14)
2011–2012	Gramshi	27	(4)
2012–2017	Pogradeci	73	(27)
- * Club domestic league appearances and goals as of 13 July 2015

Enkelejd Pengu or Ledio Pengu (born 23 May 1986 in Pogradec) is an Albanian footballer who played for KS Pogradeci in the Albanian First Division.
