= 2005–06 Kategoria e Parë =

Kategoria e Parë
- Season: 2005–06
- Champions: Flamurtari
- Promoted: Flamurtari; Apolonia; Kastrioti; Luftëtari
- Relegated: Egnatia; Butrinti

The 2005–06 Kategoria e Parë was the 59th season of a second-tier association football league in Albania.

== League table ==
Pos	Team	Pld	W	D	L	GF	GA	GD	Pts	Promotion or relegation
1	Flamurtari (C, P)	26	20	1	5	52	16	+36	61	Promotion to 2006–07 Kategoria Superiore
2	Apolonia (P)	26	16	7	3	47	20	+27	55	Promotion to 2006–07 Kategoria Superiore
3	Kastrioti (P)	26	15	7	4	35	14	+21	52	Promotion to 2006–07 Kategoria Superiore
4	Luftëtari (P)	26	15	3	8	37	25	+12	48	Promotion to 2006–07 Kategoria Superiore
5	Pogradeci	26	14	5	7	34	28	+6	47	
6	Tomori	26	11	4	11	42	40	+2	37	
7	Turbina	26	9	8	9	30	29	+1	35	
8	Erzeni	26	9	6	11	29	34	−5	33	
9	Minatori Tepelenë	26	8	5	13	27	31	−4	29	
10	Ada	26	9	2	15	25	40	−15	29	
11	Laçi	26	7	7	12	16	23	−7	28	
12	Besëlidhja	26	7	7	12	31	27	+4	28	
13	Egnatia (R)	26	8	4	14	27	38	−11	28	Relegation to 2006–07 Kategoria e Dytë
14	Butrinti (R)	26	1	0	25	10	77	−67	3	Relegation to 2006–07 Kategoria e Dytë

(C) Champions; (P) Promoted; (R) Relegated
