= 2010–11 Kategoria e Parë =

Kategoria e Parë
- Season: 2010–11
- Champions: Pogradeci
- Promoted: Pogradeci; Tomori; Kamza; Apolonia
- Relegated: Bilisht Sport; Partizani
- Matches: 216
- Goals: 488 (2.26 per match)
- Top goalscorer: Ilirjan Çaushaj (19)

The 2010–11 Kategoria e Parë was the 64th season of a second-tier association football league in Albania.

== Stadia and Location ==
Location of teams in 2010–11 Kategoria e Parë

Team	City/Area	Stadium	Capacity
Ada	Velipojë	Kompleks Sportiv Zmijani	
Apolonia	Fier	Loni Papuçiu Stadium	12,000
Besëlidhja	Lezhë	Brian Filipi Stadium	5,000
Bilisht Sport	Bilisht	Bilisht Stadium	
Burreli	Burrel	Liri Ballabani Stadium	2,500
Gramshi	Gramsh	Fusha Sportive Gramsh	
Gramozi	Ersekë	Ersekë Stadium	10,000
Kamza	Kamëz	Kamëz Stadium	5,500
Luftëtari	Gjirokastër	Gjirokastra Stadium	
Lushnja	Lushnjë	Abdurrahman Roza Haxhiu Stadium	11,000
Adriatiku	Mamurras		
Partizani	Tirana	Kamëz Stadium	5,500
Pogradeci	Pogradec	Gjorgji Kyçyku Stadium	
Tërbuni	Pukë	Ismail Xhemali Stadium	
Tomori	Berat	Tomori Stadium	14,500
Vlora	Vlorë	Flamurtari Stadium	8,500

== League table ==
Pos	Team	Pld	W	D	L	GF	GA	GD	Pts	Promotion or relegation
1	Pogradeci (C, P)	30	22	2	6	56	27	+29	68	Promotion to 2011–12 Kategoria Superiore
2	Tomori (P)	30	20	3	7	50	24	+26	63	Promotion to 2011–12 Kategoria Superiore
3	Kamza (P)	30	17	9	4	42	20	+22	60	Promotion to 2011–12 Kategoria Superiore
4	Apolonia (P)	30	18	6	6	50	31	+19	60	Promotion to 2011–12 Kategoria Superiore
5	Besëlidhja	30	16	9	5	40	17	+23	57	Play-off promotion to 2011–12 Kategoria Superiore
6	Adriatiku	30	13	4	13	30	29	+1	43	Play-off promotion to 2011–12 Kategoria Superiore
7	Lushnja	30	12	3	15	35	25	+10	39	
8	Gramozi	30	12	3	15	34	45	−11	39	
9	Ada	30	11	4	15	40	41	−1	37	
10	Luftëtari	30	10	7	13	23	34	−11	37	
11	Burreli	30	10	6	14	29	37	−8	36	
12	Vlora	30	10	4	16	36	47	−11	34	
13	Gramshi (O)	30	8	7	15	24	34	−10	31	Play-out relegation to 2011–12 Kategoria e Dytë
14	Tërbuni (R)	30	8	7	15	27	42	−15	31	Play-out relegation to 2011–12 Kategoria e Dytë
15	Bilisht Sport (R)	30	8	3	19	30	64	−34	27	Relegation to 2011–12 Kategoria e Dytë
16	Partizani (R)	30	4	5	21	16	45	−29	17	Relegation to 2011–12 Kategoria e Dytë

Source: Soccerway
Rules for classification: 1) points; 2) goal difference; 3) number of goals scored; 4) head-to-head points; 5) head-to-head goal difference; 6) draw. (Head-to-head record is applied for clubs with the same number of points only once all matches between said clubs have been played.)
(C) Champions; (O) Play-off winners; (P) Promoted; (R) Relegated

== Promotion playoffs ==
The sixth- and fifth-place finishers in the league faced the 9th and 10th-placed teams of the 2010–11 Kategoria Superiore, respectively, in single match promotion playoffs.

All times CEST

25 May 2011
16:00

Shkumbini	1–0 (a.e.t.)	Adriatiku
Mustafaj 93'	Report

Niko Dovana Stadium, Durrës
Attendance: 500
Referee: Elvis Peza

26 May 2011
16:00

Besëlidhja	1–4	Dinamo Tirana
Lika 36'	Report	Ferraj 38'; Martirena 44'; Allmuça 54'; Vila 64'

Besa Stadium, Kavajë
Attendance: 800
Referee: Lorenc Jemini
