= 1934 Kategoria e Dytë =

Season of the Albanian Football League First Division

Kategoria e Dytë
- Season: 1934
- Champions: Shqiponja Gjirokastër
- Promoted: Dragoj Pogradec

The 1934 Kategoria e Dytë is the fourth season of the second tier of football in Albania. The league began in April and finished on 24 June 1934. The league was divided into 2 groups, with the winners of Group A and B playing each other in the final. The final was played between Shqiponja Gjirokastër and Vetëtima Himarë, which Shqiponja Gjirokastër won 3-0.

Despite winning the league Shqiponja Gjirokastër were not promoted as there was no Albanian National Championship played in 1935, and as the club did not register for the 1936 season they were replaced by Dragoj Pogradec.

== Group A ==
Team	Location
Shqiponja Gjirokastër	Gjirokastër
Dragoj Pogradec	Pogradec
Leka i Madh Permet	Permet

Shqiponja Gjirokastër won the group

== Group B ==
Team	Location
Vetëtima Himarë	Himarë
SK Fier	Fier
Kongresi i Lushnjës	Lushnjë
Muzaka Berat	Berat

Vetëtima Himarë won the group

== Final ==
24 June 1934	Shqiponja Gjirokastër	3–0	Vetëtima Himarë	Tirana, Albania

Match was suspended after 81 minutes
