= 2006–07 Kategoria Superiore =

Kategoria Superiore
- Season: 2006–07
- Dates: 26 August 2006 – 19 May 2007
- Champions: Tirana; 23rd Albanian title
- Relegated: Luftëtari; Apolonia
- Champions League: Tirana
- UEFA Cup: Teuta; Besa
- Intertoto Cup: Vllaznia
- Matches: 198
- Goals: 471 (2.38 per match)
- Top goalscorer: Vioresin Sinani (23 goals)

The 2006–07 Kategoria Superiore was the 71st season of top-tier football in Albania and the ninth season under the name Kategoria Superiore.

== Teams ==
=== Stadia and last season ===
Locations of the 2006–07 Kategoria Superiore teams

Team	Location	Stadium	Capacity	Last season
Apolonia	Fier	Loni Papuçiu Stadium	10,000	Kategoria e Parë
Besa	Kavajë	Besa Stadium	8,000	5th
Dinamo Tirana	Tirana	Qemal Stafa Stadium (Note: Dinamo Tirana, Partizani and Tirana all shared the Qemal Stafa Stadium as well as the Selman Stërmasi Stadium.)	19,700	3rd
Elbasani	Elbasan	Ruzhdi Bizhuta Stadium	15,000	Champions
Flamurtari	Vlorë	Flamurtari Stadium	15,000	Kategoria e Parë
Luftëtari	Gjirokastër	Gjirokastër Stadium	9,000	Kategoria e Parë
Kastrioti	Krujë	Kastrioti Stadium	3,500	Kategoria e Parë
Partizani	Tirana	Qemal Stafa Stadium	19,700	4th
Shkumbini	Peqin	Shkumbini Stadium	6,000	7th
Teuta	Durrës	Niko Dovana Stadium	12,040	8th
Tirana	Tirana	Qemal Stafa Stadium	19,700	2nd
Vllaznia	Shkodër	Loro Boriçi Stadium	15,000	6th

== League table ==
Pos	Team	Pld	W	D	L	GF	GA	GD	Pts	Qualification or relegation
1	Tirana (C)	33	22	6	5	64	33	+31	72	Qualification for the Champions League first qualifying round
2	Teuta	33	19	10	4	44	26	+18	67	Qualification for the UEFA Cup first qualifying round
3	Vllaznia	33	18	9	6	46	28	+18	63	Qualification for the Intertoto Cup first round
4	Partizani	33	17	6	10	44	25	+19	57	
5	Dinamo Tirana	33	14	5	14	41	39	+2	47	
6	Besa	33	11	8	14	35	38	−3	41	Qualification for the UEFA Cup first qualifying round (Note: Besa qualified for the UEFA Cup first qualifying round by winning the 2006–07 Albanian Cup.)
7	Elbasani	33	10	10	13	34	39	−5	40	
8	Kastrioti	33	9	10	14	32	46	−14	37	
9	Flamurtari	33	9	7	17	35	41	−6	34	
10	Shkumbini	33	10	4	19	36	53	−17	34	
11	Luftëtari (R)	33	9	6	18	28	44	−16	33	Relegation to the 2007–08 Kategoria e Parë
12	Apolonia (R)	33	7	5	21	32	59	−27	26	Relegation to the 2007–08 Kategoria e Parë

Source: Albanian Football Association (in Albanian), Soccerway
Rules for classification: 1) points; 2) points in head-to-head matches; 3) goal difference in head-to-head matches; 4) goals scored in head-to-head matches; 5) total goal difference; 6) total goals scored; 7) draw
(C) Champions; (R) Relegated

== Results ==
The schedule consisted of three rounds. During the first two rounds, each team played each other once home and away for a total of 22 matches. The pairings of the third round were then set according to the standings after the first two rounds, giving every team a third game against each opponent for a total of 33 games per team.

=== First and second round ===
Home \ Away	APO	BES	DIN	ELB	FLA	KAS	LUF	PAR	SKU	TEU	TIR	VLL
Apolonia		0–1	1–0	2–2	0–2	2–3	0–0	0–2	3–2	2–2	0–2	1–4
Besa	2–1		0–0	2–2	3–0	0–0	3–1	0–2	2–1	1–1	1–2	1–1
Dinamo	2–1	3–1		2–1	2–1	2–0	4–1	0–0	2–1	1–3	1–2	0–0
Elbasani	2–0	1–0	1–0		2–1	1–0	1–0	0–2	2–0	0–1	2–2	0–1
Flamurtari	4–0	1–2	2–0	0–2		2–0	1–0	1–0	1–1	1–2	3–2	1–1
Kastrioti	1–1	2–2	0–1	1–0	1–0		1–0	2–2	0–0	1–1	2–1	1–1
Luftëtari	1–0	1–0	2–0	0–0	0–0	2–0		0–0	1–0	2–1	0–2	2–3
Partizani	3–2	0–0	2–1	0–1	0–3	1–0	3–1		2–0	2–0	0–2	0–0
Shkumbini	0–1	0–1	0–1	3–0	2–1	0–2	1–0	0–2		0–2	1–2	3–1
Teuta	2–0	1–0	0–0	1–0	1–0	2–1	1–1	0–0	1–1		1–1	1–0
Tirana	3–1	1–2	2–1	2–0	2–0	7–3	1–0	3–2	2–2	5–0		1–0
Vllaznia	1–2	1–0	3–0	2–0	2–2	2–1	1–0	1–0	2–1	3–1	1–1	

Source: Albanian Football Association
Legend: Blue = home team win; Yellow = draw; Red = away team win.

=== Third round ===
Home \ Away	APO	BES	DIN	ELB	FLA	KAS	LUF	PAR	SKU	TEU	TIR	VLL
Apolonia				1–1	1–0	1–2	2–1		3–1			
Besa	2–1		2–0		2–0		1–2			0–1	0–1	
Dinamo	2–1			1–1		2–0		0–2	5–0			1–2
Elbasani		3–0			1–1		4–4			0–0	1–2	
Flamurtari			2–3			0–0		0–2	2–0			0–2
Kastrioti		2–1		1–1			1–0			1–2	1–1	
Luftëtari			0–2		2–1			3–1	1–3			0–1
Partizani	2–0	2–1		1–0		4–1			5–0			0–1
Shkumbini		3–1		4–2		2–1				0–1	2–1	
Teuta	4–1		3–1		2–1		3–0	1–0			2–0	
Tirana	1–0		2–1		1–1		2–0	1–0				4–2
Vllaznia	2–1	1–1		2–0		2–0			0–2	0–0		

Source: Albanian Football Association
Legend: Blue = home team win; Yellow = draw; Red = away team win.

== Season statistics ==
=== Scoring ===
==== Top scorers ====
As of 31 July 2015

Rank	Player	Club	Goals
1	(Albania) Vioresin Sinani	Tirana	23
2	(Albania) Daniel Xhafaj	Teuta	20
3	(Albania) Sebino Plaku	Apolonia	15
4	(Albania) Hamdi Salihi	Tirana	13
5	(Albania) Oriand Abazaj	Kastrioti/Tirana	12
6	(Albania) Parid Xhihani	Besa	10
6	(Albania) Roland Nenaj	Flamurtari	10
6	(Albania) Gentian Stojku	Elbasani	10
9	(Albania) Erjon Rizvanolli	Shkumbini	9
9	(Albania) Klevis Dalipi	Vllaznia	9
9	(Albania) Suad Liçi	Vllaznia	9
