= Mateo Panadić =

Croatian footballer

Personal information
- Date of birth: 6 October 1994 (age 32)
- Place of birth: Zagreb, Croatia
- Height: 1.88 m (6 ft 2 in)
- Positions: Midfielder; forward

Team information
- Current team: Otrant-Olympic
- Number: 98

Youth career
- Gorica

Senior career*
| Years | Team | Apps | (Gls) |
| 2012-2013 | Gorica | 13 | (0) |
| 2014 | Austria Wien II | 5 | (0) |
| 2014 | Istra II | | |
| 2015 | Vrapče | | |
| 2015 | Schalke II | 1 | (0) |
| 2016 | Assyriska | 10 | (0) |
| 2017 | Aluminij | 8 | (0) |
| 2018 | Brežice | 11 | (1) |
| 2019 | Wiener Neustadt | 9 | (0) |
| 2019 | Rogaška | 6 | (0) |
| 2020–2021 | Rudar Velenje | 28 | (2) |
| 2022 | Bardejov | 8 | (1) |
| 2022–2023 | Ferizaj | 12 | (3) |
| 2024 | Budaiya Club | | |
| 2024 | Pogradeci | 18 | (3) |
| 2025– | Otrant-Olympic | 9 | (1) |
- * Club domestic league appearances and goals as of 1 June 2025

Mateo Panadić (born 6 October 1994) is a Croatian footballer who plays as a midfielder or attacker for Otrant-Olympic in Montenegro.

== Career ==
Before the second half of 2013/14, Panadić signed for the reserves of Austria Wien, one of Austria's most successful clubs, after playing for Gorica (Croatia) in the Croatian second division.

Before the second half of 2014/15, he signed for Croatian third division side Vrapče, before trialing for Chemnitzer FC in the German third division.

In 2015, he signed for the reserves of German Bundesliga side Schalke.

Before the 2016 season, Panadić signed for Assyriska in the Swedish second division through a fan fundraiser.

Before the second half of 2016/17, he signed for Slovenian top flight team Aluminij, where he made 8 league appearances and scored 0 goals.

Before the second half of 2018/19, Panadić signed for Wiener Neustadt in the Austrian second division after playing for Slovenian second division outfit Brežice, where he made 10 appearances and scored 0 goals.

In 2019, he signed for Rogaška in the Slovenian second division.

== Personal life ==
Panadić is the son of Yugoslavia international Andrej Panadić.
