= Albi Çekiçi =

Albanian footballer

Personal information
- Date of birth: 28 October 1992 (age 34)
- Place of birth: Pogradec, Albania
- Position: Forward

Youth career
- Pogradeci

Senior career*
Years	Team	Apps	(Gls)
2011–2016	Pogradeci	106	(78)
2016–2017	Kamza	26	(8)
2017−2018	Pogradeci	22	(17)
2018	Llapi		
2018−2019	Besa	19	(7)
- * Club domestic league appearances and goals

Albi Çekiçi (born 28 October 1992) is an Albanian former footballer who played as a forward.

== Honours ==
=== Club ===
KS Pogradeci

- Albanian First Division: 2010–11

FC Kamza

- Albanian First Division: 2016–17
