= Klejdis Branica =

Albanian footballer

Kleidis Branica
Personal information
- Full name: Kleidis Sokol Branica
- Date of birth: 10 May 1992 (age 34)
- Place of birth: Peqin, Albania
- Height: 1.86 m (6 ft 1 in)
- Position: Forward

Team information
- Current team: Burreli
- Number: 9

Youth career
- –2010: Shkumbini
- 2010–20111: Tirana

Senior career*
Years	Team	Apps	(Gls)
2009–2010	Shkumbini	3	(2)
2010–2011	Tirana	0	(0)
2011–2016	Shkumbini	59	(10)
2014–2015	→ Lushnja (loan)	20	(4)
2016–2018	Lushnja	48	(6)
2018–2019	Egnatia	25	(14)
2019	Apolonia	7	(3)
2020	Lushnja	7	(2)
2020–2021	Oriku	20	(4)
2020–2021	Burreli	13	(1)

International career
2010–2011	Albania U19	3	(0)
2012–2013	Albania U21	2	(0)
- * Club domestic league appearances and goals

Kleidis Sokol Branica (born 10 May 1992) is an Albanian footballer who currently plays as a forward for KF Oriku in the Albanian First Division. Primarily a striker, he is a prolific goalscorer who is best known for his technique, creativity, strength, ability in the air. He finished the last campaign with Egnatia 15 goals. Branica surpassed his previous goalscoring feats to achieve a new personal best of 15 goals.

== Personal life ==
He is the son of former Elbasani player and Shkumbini Peqin head coach Sokol Branica.
