= Dauda Danladi =

Nigerian diplomat

High Commissioner

Personal details
- Born: 7 November 1957 (age 68) Biu
- Children: 7

Dauda Danladi is a Nigerian diplomat, who served as the Ambassador of Nigeria to Pakistan from 2012 to 2015, as the authority in charge of the Nigerian Embassy in Islamabad.
