= Suleiman Danladi =

Nigerian footballer (born 2000)

Personal information
- Date of birth: 3 December 2000 (age 25)
- Place of birth: Odogomu, Kogi State, Nigeria
- Height: 1.87 m (6 ft 2 in)
- Position: Midfielder

Team information
- Current team: KS Pogradeci

Youth career
- 2015: Remo Soccer Academy

Senior career*
Years	Team	Apps	(Gls)
2021	Niger Tornadoes	10	(0)
2023	KS Pogradeci	8	(0)
- * Club domestic league appearances and goals

Suleiman Danladi (born 3 December 2000) is a Nigerian professional footballer who plays as a midfielder for KS Pogradeci in the Kategoria E dyte, the third division of Albanian football.

== Career ==
Danladi began his football career at Remo Soccer Academy, a youth football club based in Lagos, Nigeria. He later had a brief stint with Niger Tornadoes in the Nigerian Professional Football League (NPFL) before making a move to Europe in September 2023.

== Career highlights ==
Danladi's career highlights include his consistent performances for KS Pogradeci, where he has featured in almost all league games for the club. His contributions have been notable in the team's quest for promotion in the Kategoria E Dyte.
