= Dritan Mehmeti =

Albanian footballer and manager

Personal information
- Date of birth: 9 January 1980 (age 46)
- Place of birth: Tirana, PSR Albania
- Position: Midfielder

Senior career*
Years	Team	Apps	(Gls)
2002–2005	Besa		
2005–2008	Butrinti		
2008–2009	Delvina		
2009–2010	Butrinti		

Managerial career
- 2012: Dinamo Tirana
- 2013–2015: Dinamo Tirana
- 2015–2016: Korabi
- 2018: Partizani (assistant)
- 2021–2022: Partizani
- 2023: Dinamo Tirana
- 2023: Dinamo Tirana U-19
- 2023−2024: Dinamo Tirana
- 2026−: Pogradeci
- * Club domestic league appearances and goals as of 2016

Dritan Mehmeti (born 9 January 1980) is a former Albanian footballer and manager of Pogradeci.
