= Danladi Mohammed =

Nigerian politician

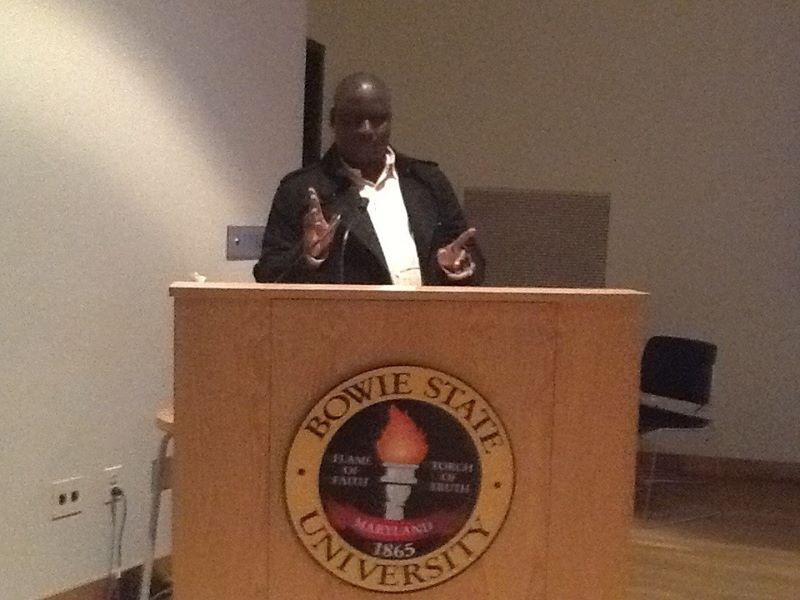
Hon-Danladi Mohammed making a speech at Bowie State University- 2014-06-08 17-57

Honourable. Danladi Mohammed was the Commissioner for Economic and Planning for the Nigerian state of Gombe.

== Early life and education ==
Danladi Mohammed was born to Muhammad Pantami and Amina Pantami on 29 September 1968. He began his education at Jan-Kai Primary School in Gombe State. He obtained a degree in economics at the University of Maiduguri. He obtained an MBA in finance, from Abubakar Tafawa Balewa University. He also attended a course on policy analysis and policy implementation in 2011 at Global Training Consultation London, an executive leadership management in the year 2014 at Howard, Washington, D.C., US, and a course on budgeting financing for gender equity at the Bowie State University in 2014.
