= 1930 Kategoria e Dytë =

Kampionati i Dytë
- Season: 1930
- Champions: Muzaka Berat

The inaugural season of Kampionati i Dytë, the second-tier football league in the Albanian Kingdom, took place during the fall of 1930. Five teams competed, with Muzaka Berat emerging as champions, while Bardhyli Lezhë secured the runner-up position. There were no relegations.

== League table ==
Pos	Team	Pld	W	D	L	GF	GA	GD	Pts
1	Muzaka Berat (P)	8	7	1	0	n/a	n/a	—	15
2	Bardhyli Lezhë	8	4	2	2	n/a	n/a	—	10
3	Shqiponja Gjirokastër	8	3	1	4	n/a	n/a	—	7
4	SK Fieri	8	2	2	4	n/a	n/a	—	6
5	Kongresi Lushnjë (Note: Did not relegate)	8	0	1	7	n/a	n/a	—	1

(P) Promoted

== Championship lineup ==
- (Albania) Llaki Bufi (GK)
- (Albania) Loni Qytyqy (GK)
- (Albania) Petraq Tusha (GK)
- (Albania) Xhavit Agolli
- (Albania) Hajdar Cakrani
- (Albania) Luan Dibra
- (Albania) Mimi Felau
- (Albania) Vasil Kajana
- (Albania) Fiqiri Nuri
- (Albania) Taqi Nushi
- (Albania) Sulejman Protopapa
- (Albania) Alqiviadhi Shyti
- (Albania) Vangjel Veveçka
- (Albania) Lilo Xhimitiku
- (Albania) Jani Kosta (player-manager)
