= Kategoria e Parë =

Association football league in Albania

- Organising body: FSHF
- Founded: 1930; 96 years ago
- Country: Albania
- Confederation: UEFA
- Number of clubs: 12
- Level on pyramid: 2
- Promotion to: Kategoria Superiore
- Relegation to: Kategoria e Dytë
- Domestic cup: Albanian Cup
- Current champions: Laçi (3rd title) (2025–26)
- Most championships: Luftëtari (9 titles)
- Broadcaster(s): RTSH
- Website: www.fshf.org
- Current: 2026–27 Kategoria e Parë

Kategoria e Parë is the second tier of professional football in Albania, positioned below Kategoria Superiore and above Kategoria e Dytë.

Established in 1930, the league comprises 12 teams. The top two teams earn direct promotion to Kategoria Superiore, while the teams ranked 3rd to 6th enter a playoff tournament.

The winner faces the 8th-placed team from Kategoria Superiore in a promotion play-off match. At the other end of the table, the bottom two teams are relegated to Kategoria e Dytë, while the teams finishing 9th and 10th must compete in a relegation play-off to retain their spot in the league.

== Clubs (2026–27) ==
2026–27 Kategoria e Parë teams.

| Team | Location |
|---|---|
| Besa | Kavajë |
| Besëlidhja | Lezhë |
| Burreli | Burrel |
| Bylis | Ballsh |
| Flamurtari | Vlorë |
| Iliria | Fushë-Krujë |
| Kastrioti | Krujë |
| Korabi | Peshkopi |
| Kukësi | Kukës |
| Oriku | Orikum |
| Pogradeci | Pogradec |
| Sopoti | Librazhd |

== Champions ==
| Year | Champions | Runners-up | Top scorer | Goals |
|---|---|---|---|---|
| 1930 | Muzaka Berat | Bardhyli Lezhë | | |
| ~~1931~~ | Season was not played | | | |
| 1932 | SK Kavaja | SK Vlora | | |
| 1933 | Bashkimi Elbasanas | SK Vlora | | |
| 1934 | Shqiponja Gjirokastër | Vetëtima Himarë | | |
| ~~1935~~ | Season was not played | | | |
| 1936–37 | Bardhyli Lezhë | Tomorri Berat | | |
| ~~1937–48~~ | Seasons were not played | | | |
| ~~1948–49~~ | Season was annulled | | | |
| 1950 | Berati | NBSH Shijak | | |
| 1951 | Dinamo Vlorë | Puna Shijak | | |
| ~~1952~~ | Season was not played | | | |
| 1953 | Spartaku Tiranë | Puna Elbasan | | |
| 1954 | Dinamo Shkodër | Puna Gjirokastër | | |
| ~~1955~~ | Season was not played | | | |
| 1956 | Spartaku Tiranë | Puna Fier | | |
| 1957 | Puna Shkodër | Puna Berat | | |
| 1958 | Labinoti Elbasan | Tomorri Berat | | |
| 1959 | Teuta | Erzeni | | |
| 1960 | Lushnja | Luftëtari | | |
| 1961 | Teuta | Korabi | | |
| 1962 | Vllaznia | Tomori | | |
| 1962–63 | Luftëtari | Erzeni | | |
| 1963–64 | Pogradeci | Naftëtari | | |
| 1964–65 | Erzeni | Naftëtari | | |
| 1965–66 | Luftëtari | Albpetrol | | |
| 1966–67 | Apolonia | Tekstilisti Stalin | | |
| 1968 | Tekstilisti Stalin | Naftëtari | | |
| ~~1969~~ | Season was not played | | | |
| 1969–70 | Tomori | Besëlidhja | | |
| 1970–71 | Shkëndija Tiranë | Studenti | | |
| 1971–72 | Apolonia | Besëlidhja | | |
| 1972–73 | Naftëtari | Kamza | | |
| 1973–74 | Albpetrol | Apolonia | | |
| 1974–75 | Luftëtari | Kamza | | |
| 1975–76 | Skënderbeu | Tomori | | |
| 1976–77 | Tomori | Besëlidhja | | |
| 1977–78 | Besa | Naftëtari | | |
| 1978–79 | Apolonia | Skënderbeu | | |
| 1979–80 | Besëlidhja | Lushnja | | |
| 1980–81 | Burreli | Përmeti | | |
| 1981–82 | Lushnja | Skënderbeu | | |
| 1982–83 | Burreli | Tepelena | | |
| 1983–84 | Besëlidhja | Apolonia | | |
| 1984–85 | Apolonia | Shkëndija Tiranë | | |
| 1985–86 | Besa | Skënderbeu | | |
| 1986–87 | Besëlidhja | Burreli | | |
| 1987–88 | Lushnja | Naftëtari | | |
| 1988–89 | Luftëtari | Tomori | | |
| 1989–90 | Lushnja | Kastrioti | | |
| 1990–91 | Pogradeci | Selenicë | | |
| 1991–92 | Sopoti | Albpetrol | | |
| 1992–93 | Besëlidhja | Shkumbini | | |
| 1993–94 | Luftëtari | Iliria | | |
| 1994–95 | Kastrioti | Skënderbeu | | |
| 1995–96 | Lushnja | Bylis | | |
| ~~1996–97~~ | Season was interrupted | | | |
| 1997–98 | Burreli | Memaliaj | | |
| 1998–99 | Luftëtari | Albpetrol | | |
| 1999–2000 | Besëlidhja | Besa | | |
| 2000–01 | Partizani | Erzeni | | |
| 2001–02 | Elbasani | Besa | | |
| 2002–03 | Egnatia | Tomori | | |
| 2003–04 | Laçi | Egnatia | | |
| 2004–05 | Skënderbeu | Besa | | |
| 2005–06 | Flamurtari | Apolonia | | |
| 2006–07 | Skënderbeu | Besëlidhja | | |
| 2007–08 | Bylis | Apolonia | | |
| 2008–09 | Laçi | Skënderbeu | | |
| 2009–10 | Bylis | Elbasani | | |
| 2010–11 | Pogradeci | Tomori | Ilirjan Çaushaj | 19 |
| 2011–12 | Luftëtari | Kukësi | Kreshnik Ivanaj | 27 |
| 2012–13 | Lushnja | Partizani | Mikel Canka | 21 |
| 2013–14 | Elbasani | Apolonia | Mustafa Agastra | 21 |
| 2014–15 | Bylis | Tërbuni | Cate Fonseca; Jasmin Raboshta | 17 |
| 2015–16 | Luftëtari | Korabi | Kosta Bajić | 23 |
| 2016–17 | Kamza | Lushnja | Armand Pasha | 20 |
| 2017–18 | Tirana | Kastrioti | Albi Çekiçi | 17 |
| 2018–19 | Bylis | Vllaznia | Klejdis Branica | 14 |
| 2019–20 | Apolonia | Kastrioti | Klodian Nuri | 17 |
| 2020–21 | Egnatia | Dinamo Tirana | Mikel Canka | 15 |
| 2021–22 | Bylis | Erzeni | Eridon Qardaku | 20 |
| 2022–23 | Skënderbeu | Dinamo Tirana | Abdul Temitope; Denisson Silva | 12 |
| 2023–24 | Elbasani | Bylis | Peter Itodo | 19 |
| 2024–25 | Vora | Flamurtari | Manfredas Ruzgis | 24 |
| 2025–26 | Laçi | Skënderbeu | Saleh Nasr | 18 |

== See also ==
- List of football clubs in Albania
