= Liri Ballabani Stadium =

Stadium in Albania

Coordinates: 41°36′32.26″N 20°00′25.11″E

Liri Ballabani Stadium (a.k.a. Burreli Stadium, Albanian: Stadiumi Liri Ballabani or Stadiumi i Burrelit) is a multi-purpose stadium in Burrel, Albania. The stadium is the home ground of KS Burreli and has a capacity of 3,000.
