= Gjorgji Kyçyku Stadium =

Stadium in Pogradec, Albania

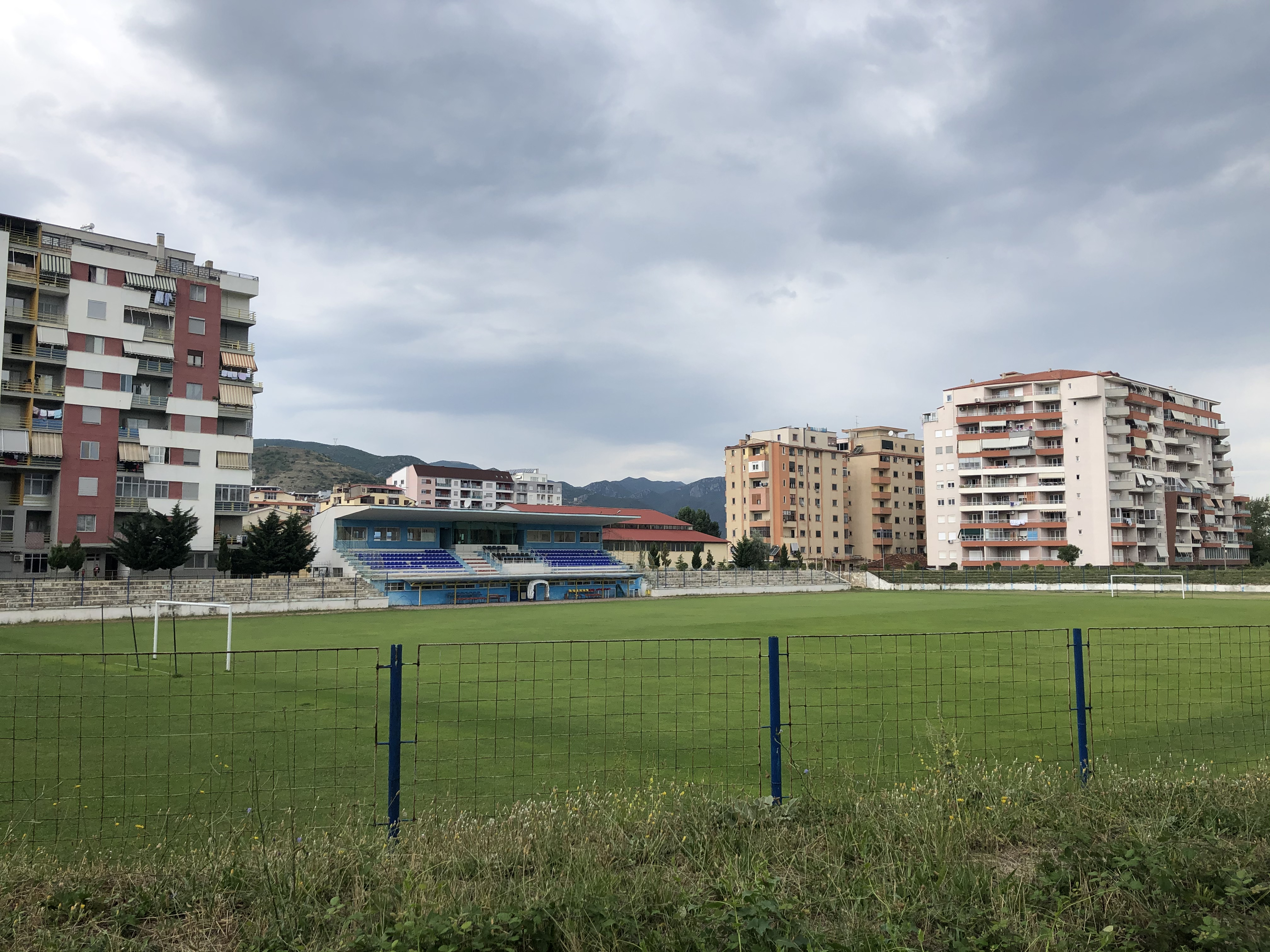
- The Gjorgji Kyçyku Stadium in 2015.
- Interactive map of Gjorgji Kyçyku Stadium
- Location: Pogradec, Albania
- Coordinates: 40°54′0″N 20°39′50″E
- Owner: Municipality of Pogradec
- Capacity: 10,700
- Surface: Natural grass
- Field size: 105 by 69 metres (115 by 75 yd)

Tenant
- KS Pogradeci (1932-present)

Gjorgji Kyçyku Stadium is a stadium in Pogradec, Albania. It is the home ground of KS Pogradeci.

== History ==
Gjorgji Kyçyku is the stadium where the football team KS Pogradeci has played since 1932. Since the teams establishment they have won 5 trophies in Pogradec; 3 in the First Division and 2 in the Second Division.

== Matches since 2018 ==
=== 2018-2019 season ===
2019-20 KS Pogradeci season

| 9 September 2018 | KS Pogradeci | 2-1 | Besa Kavajë | Gjorgji Kyçyku Stadium, Pogradec |
| 16:00 First Division | E.Topllari 45'; M.Pere 55' | | A.Çekiçi 50' |

| 12 September 2018 | KS Pogradeci | 0-1 | KF Apolonia Fier | Gjorgji Kyçyku Stadium, Pogradec |
| 16:00 Cup | | | K.Mehmeti 66' |

| 15 September 2019 | KS Pogradeci | 0-1 | FK Tomori Berat | Gjorgji Kyçyku Stadium, Pogradec |
| 16:00 First Division | | | K.Agbodike 28' |

| 29 September 2018 | KS Pogradeci | 3-1 | FK Egnatia | Gjorgji Kyçyku Stadium, Pogradec |
| 16:00 First Division | B.Ibrahimllari (OG) 7'; S.Jahaj 39' (pen.); E.Topllari 45' | | M.Canka 3' |

| 20 October 2018 | KS Pogradeci | 1-0 | KF Apolonia Fier | Gjorgji Kyçyku Stadium, Pogradec |
| 14:00 First Division | H.Shkulaku 83' |

| 3 November 2018 | KS Pogradeci | 4-1 | KF Elbasani | Gjorgji Kyçyku Stadium, Pogradec |
| 14:00 First Division | P.Ivani 12'; H.Shkulaku 32'; A.Osmanllari 55'; M.Pere 82' | | B.Brahimaj 60' (pen.) |

| 8 December 2018 | KS Pogradeci | 2-1 | KF Oriku | Gjorgji Kyçyku Stadium, Pogradec |
| 14:00 First Division | E.Topllari 15'; A.Alillari 79' | | A.Dhrami 36' (pen.) |

| 22 December 2018 | KS Pogradeci | 5-1 | KS Turbina Cërrik | Gjorgji Kyçyku Stadium, Pogradec |
| 13:30 First Division | A.Alillari 6', 26'; S.Jahaj 39'; E.Topllari 45' (pen.), 74' | | U.Osuagwu 66' |

| 10 February 2019 | KS Pogradeci | 0-3 | KF Bylis Ballsh | Gjorgji Kyçyku Stadium, Pogradec |
| 14:00 First Division | | | V.Murataj 59'; S.Guindo 63'; S.Janku 90' |

| 23 February 2019 | KS Pogradeci | 1-0 | KS Lushnja | Gjorgji Kyçyku Stadium, Pogradec |
| 14:00 First Division | E.Topllari 82' |

| 17 March 2019 | KS Pogradeci | 1-0 | KS Turbina Cërrik | Gjorgji Kyçyku Stadium, Pogradec |
| 15:00 First Division | M.Pere 20' |

| 13 April 2019 | KS Pogradeci | 2-1 | FK Tomori Berat | Gjorgji Kyçyku Stadium, Pogradec |
| 16:00 First Division | J.Liçkollari 22'; E.Topllari 62' | | A.Dervishi 12' |

| 21 April 2019 | KS Pogradeci | 0-1 | KF Elbasani | Gjorgji Kyçyku Stadium, Pogradec |
| 15:00 First Division | | | M.Ferhati 55' |

| 11 May 2019 | KS Pogradeci | 3-0 | KF Apolonia Fier | Gjorgji Kyçyku Stadium, Pogradec |
| 16:00 First Division | M.Pere 13'; E.Topllari 25'; H.Shkulaku 90' |

Note: For all matches click on KS Pogradeci site on Soccerway.

=== 2019-2020 season ===
| 18 September 2019 | KS Pogradeci | 0-4 | KF Bylis Ballsh | Gjorgji Kyçyku Stadium, Pogradec |
| 16:00 Cup | | | E.Ndreca 17', 49'; F.Opoku 67'; J.Goxha 76' |

| 21 September 2019 | KS Pogradeci | 3-0 | KF Iliria | Gjorgji Kyçyku Stadium, Pogradec |
| 16:00 First Division | A.Alillari 56', 58', 71' |

| 5 October 2019 | KS Pogradeci | 0-0 | FK Shënkolli | Gjorgji Kyçyku Stadium, Pogradec |
| 14:00 First Division |

| 26 October 2019 | KS Pogradeci | 2-1 | KF Apolonia Fier | Gjorgji Kyçyku Stadium, Pogradec |
| 13:00 First Division | J.Liçkollari 15'; S.Jahaj 89' (pen.) | | R.Mihana 78' |

| 9 November 2019 | KS Pogradeci | 3-1 | Besa Kavajë | Gjorgji Kyçyku Stadium, Pogradec |
| 13:00 First Division | E.Topllari 16'; A.Alillari 44'; I.Shyti 46' | | T.Cara 61' |

| 7 December 2019 | KS Pogradeci | 4-3 | KF Devolli | Gjorgji Kyçyku Stadium, Pogradec |
| 13:00 First Division | E.Hidri 21'; S.Jahaj 64' (pen.); E.Topllari 84'; A.Pura 90+3' | | S.Çela 18', 33'; K.Rapo 40' |

| 21 December 2019 | KS Pogradeci | 1-0 | KF Oriku | Gjorgji Kyçyku Stadium, Pogradec |
| 13:00 First Division | H.Shkulaku 81' |

| 1 February 2020 | KS Pogradeci | 3-0 | KF Elbasani | Gjorgji Kyçyku Stadium, Pogradec |
| 14:00 First Division | S.Jahaj 29' (pen.); I.Shyti 64', 75' |

| 16 February 2020 | KS Pogradeci | 2-1 | KF Lushnja | Gjorgji Kyçyku Stadium, Pogradec |
| 13:00 First Division | J.Liçkollari 6'; S.Jahaj 15' (pen.) | | E.Gjyla 31' |

| 29 February 2020 | KS Pogradeci | 5-1 | KF Turbina Cërrik | Gjorgji Kyçyku Stadium, Pogradec |
| 14:00 First Division | J.Liçkollari 8'; H.Shkulaku 30'; E.Topllari 55'; A.Alillari 88', 90' | | M.McNamara 22' |

Note: For all matches click on KS Pogradeci site on Soccerway.
