= Tekstilisti Stalin =

Albanian football club

- Full name: Tekstilisti Stalin
- Founded: 1949; 77 years ago
- Dissolved: 1976
- Ground: Yzberisht

Tekstilisti Stalin is a former Albanian football club which competed in the Albanian Superliga and Albanian First Division until it dissolved in 1976. The club represented the textiles factory located in the neighbourhood of Kombinat in Tiranë, which was a gift from the Soviet dictator Joseph Stalin to the Albanian dictator Enver Hoxha, hence the name of the factory.
