= KF Sopoti =

Albanian football club

Sopoti
- Full name: Klubi i Futbollit Sopoti
- Nickname: Sopotarët
- Founded: 1948; 78 years ago
- Ground: Sopoti Stadium
- Capacity: 3,000
- President: Bashkia Librazhd
- Chairman: Kastriot Gurra
- Manager: Rrahman Hallaçi
- League: Kategoria e Parë
- 2025–26: Kategoria e Dytë, Group A, 2nd (promoted)
Home colours	Away colours

Klubi i Futbollit Sopoti is an Albanian football club based in Librazhd. It currently competes in Kategoria e Parë, the second tier of Albanian football.

== History ==
Founded in 1948 under the name KS Albania Tabak Librazhd, they play their home matches at the Sopoti Stadium. The club is named after the nearby Sopot mountain. They spent the 1992/93, 1993/94, 1995/96 and 1996/97 seasons in the Kategoria Superiore. Before the 1996/97 season, they changed their name back to Albania Tabak Librazhd, only to change it to Sopoti Librazhd once more the next year.

== Stadium ==
The club's home ground is the multi-use Sopoti Stadium which is situated in the centre of the town next to the municipality building. The stadium which has a capacity of 3,000 spectators was built in 1964 and has been the club's home ever since. The stadium is not currently fit for use but the Albanian Football Association along with the Librazhd Municipality have drawn up initial plans to reconstruct the stadium in its entirety, but such plans have yet to be materialised due to a lack of funding.

As of the 2014–15 season, the stadium does not meet the current Albanian Football Association's standard requirements, due to the outdated and run down nature of the building as well as the field.

== Recent seasons ==
Season	League									Cup
Season	Division	P	W	D	L	F	A	Pts	Pos	Cup
2017–18	Albanian Second Division	24	6	5	13	35	44	23	10th/14	First round
2018–19	Albanian Second Division	22	12	5	5	51	25	41	5th/13	—

== List of managers ==
- (Albania) Kostika Sterja (1992–1994)
- (Albania) Luan Deliu (1994–1997)
- (Albania) Ylli Hasa (1997–1998)
- (Albania) Gentian Stojku (Aug 2014 - Mar 2015)
- (Albania) Edmond Dalipi (Mar 2015 - May 2015)
- (Albania) Alpin Gallo (Aug 2016 - Oct 2016)
- (Albania) Bekim Kuli (Mar 2017 - Jun 2017)
- (Albania) Klajdi Kënga (Aug 2017 –Jan 2020)
- (Albania) Besnik Cota (Jul 2021 –Jun 2022)
- (Albania) Shkëlqim Lleshnaku (Jul 2022 –Jun 2023)
- (Albania) Besnik Kola (Jul 2022 –Jun 2025)
- (Albania) Rrahman Hallaçi (Aug 2025 –)
