= KF Naftëtari =

Albanian football club

Naftëtari
- Full name: Klubi i Futbollit Naftëtari
- Founded: 1926; 100 years ago
- Ground: Stadiumi Bashkim Sulejmani
- Capacity: 5,000
- Manager: Eldison Kapo
- League: Kategoria e Dytë, Group A
- 2025–26: Kategoria e Dytë, Group A, 8th
Home colours	Away colours

Klubi i Futbollit Naftëtari, commonly known as Naftëtari, is an Albanian football club based in Kuçovë. Their home ground is the Bashkim Sulejmani Stadium and they currently compete in the Kategoria e Dytë.

Naftëtari means Oilmen, with Kuçovë being the centre of the Albanian oil industry.

== History ==
Founded in 1926, they first participated in the Albanian Superliga in 1946 as Spartak Kuçovë. During the communist era they were first known as Puna Qyteti Stalin, then Spartaku Qyteti Stalin and for most of the time Naftëtari Qyteti Stalin. Naftëtari played their final season in the Albanian Superliga in 1987.

In the 1987/88 season, Naftëtari qualified for a promotion/relegation playoff after finishing runners-up to second tier champions Traktori Lushnja. After losing the first match 1–0 away to Albanian giants and Ministry of Interior club Dinamo Tirana, the second match in Qyteti Stalin on 5 June 1988 ended in riots and burning of the Dinamo team bus partly because the game was led by a referee and assistants from Tirana. Dinamo also won the second leg and the riots led to the suspension of Naftëtari from playing football for a year and demotion to the third tier. Coach Pandi Angjeli and players Meta and Makashi were suspended for life and club manager and former goalkeeper Fatmir Ismaili was dismissed.

== Stadium ==
The stadium of Naftëtari Kuçovë is located in Kuçovë, Albania. The name of the stadium is Stadiumi Bashkim Sulejmani. It has a capacity of 5,000 spectators.

== Supporters ==
=== Rivalries ===
Naftëtari's biggest rivals are Tomori Berat, with Berat only 20 kilometres down the road and with fans of both clubs working together in the textile industry during the 1970s.

== Current squad ==
As of 22 November 2017

Note: Flags indicate national team as defined under FIFA eligibility rules; some limited exceptions apply. Players may hold more than one non-FIFA nationality.

No.	Pos.	Nation	Player
1	GK	ALB	Albano Kora
2	DF	ALB	Ardit Lleshi
3	DF	ALB	Sajmir Gega (Captain)
5	DF	ALB	Florian Daci
6	DF	ALB	Enea Kajo
7	MF	ALB	Florian Kopaçi
8	MF	ALB	Endri Koroveshi
10	MF	ALB	Ardian Gega
14	MF	ALB	Redon Behari

No.	Pos.	Nation	Player
17	FW	ALB	Romario Alushi
19	FW	ALB	Gëzim Hyska
4	DF	ALB	Martin Gucaj
11	FW	ALB	Klajdi Pepa
12	GK	ALB	Kristian Gjini
13	DF	ALB	Gerald Bega
18	MF	ALB	Azis Pepa
21	MF	ALB	Anesti Marini
22	DF	ALB	Ardian Kaloshi
