= KS Pogradeci =

Albanian football club

Pogradeci
- Full name: Klubi Sportiv Pogradeci
- Nicknames: Liqenorët(The Lakers); Verdheblutë(Yellowblues)
- Founded: 1932; 94 years ago as Sportklub Pogradeci Dragoj (1932–44) Spartaku Pogradec (1945–58) Ylli i Kuq (1958–91) Pogradeci (1991–present)
- Ground: Gjorgji Kyçyku Stadium
- Capacity: 10,700*
- Owner: Bashkia Pogradec
- President: Ilir Xhakolli
- Manager: Dritan Mehmeti
- League: Kategoria e Parë
- 2025–26: Kategoria e Parë, 3rd
Home colours	Away colours

KS Pogradeci (Albanian: Klubi Sportiv Pogradeci) is a professional football club based in Pogradec, Albania. The club plays in the Kategoria e Parë, which is the second tier of football in the country.

== History ==
The club was founded in 1932 as Klubi Sportiv Dragoj Pogradeci. In the 1936 season, the club played for the first time in the highest league in Albania. During the largest part of the communist era, the club was known as KS Ylli i Kuq Pogradeci. The greatest success of club history is the achievement of the semi-finals of the Albanian Cup in the 1992–93 season.

== Honours ==
- (Albania) Kategoria e Parë
  - Champions (3): 1963–64, 1990–91, 2010–11
- (Albania) Kategoria e Dytë
  - Champions (3): 1959–60, 1984–85, 2023–24
  - Runners-up (1): 2003–04, 2022-23

== Players ==
=== Current squad ===
As of 1 February 2024

Note: Flags indicate national team as defined under FIFA eligibility rules; some limited exceptions apply. Players may hold more than one non-FIFA nationality.

No.	Pos.	Nation	Player
1	GK	ALB	Jurges Beqiri
2	DF	CRO	Jakov Karabatic
5	DF	ALB	Miklovan Pere (captain)
6	DF	KOS	Endrit Kastrati
7	MF	ALB	Jurgen Peqini
8	FW	NGR	Sodiq Kazeem
10	FW	ALB	Jorgo Qeleshi
13	DF	ALB	Franko Kapllani
14	MF	ALB	Fabjan Nallbati
15	FW	NGR	Freeman Pius
16	DF	ALB	Vilson Lila
18	DF	ALB	Mateo Pere
19	DF	ALB	Erjon Dragoj
20	DF	ALB	Renato Këndezi
21	MF	ALB	Devid Fejzulla
22	FW	ALB	Eldjon Topllari
23	MF	ALB	Arbër Pengu
24	DF	ALB	Kleart Grazhdani
33	DF	ALB	Vangjel Zguro

No.	Pos.	Nation	Player
48	MF	NGR	Suleiman Danladi
66	DF	BRA	Wagner
77	GK	MNE	Milan Jelovac
88	MF	ALB	Redon Raza
90	MF	CRO	Mateo Panadić
99	GK	MKD	Ivan Nikoloski
—	MF	ALB	Alesio Caushaj
—	MF	BRA	William
—	MF	VEN	Santiago Rodriguez
—	MF	ALB	Enes Kuka
—	MF	ALB	Paolo Kasmollari
—	MF	KOR	Do-Hyun Kim
—	MF	NGR	Imoh Ezekiel
—	FW	ALB	Bedri Greca
—	FW	GHA	Emmanuel Makafui
—	DF	ALB	Elvis Gjoni
—	DF	ALB	Oni Patushi
—	DF	MKD	Kristijan Toshevski

== Stadium ==
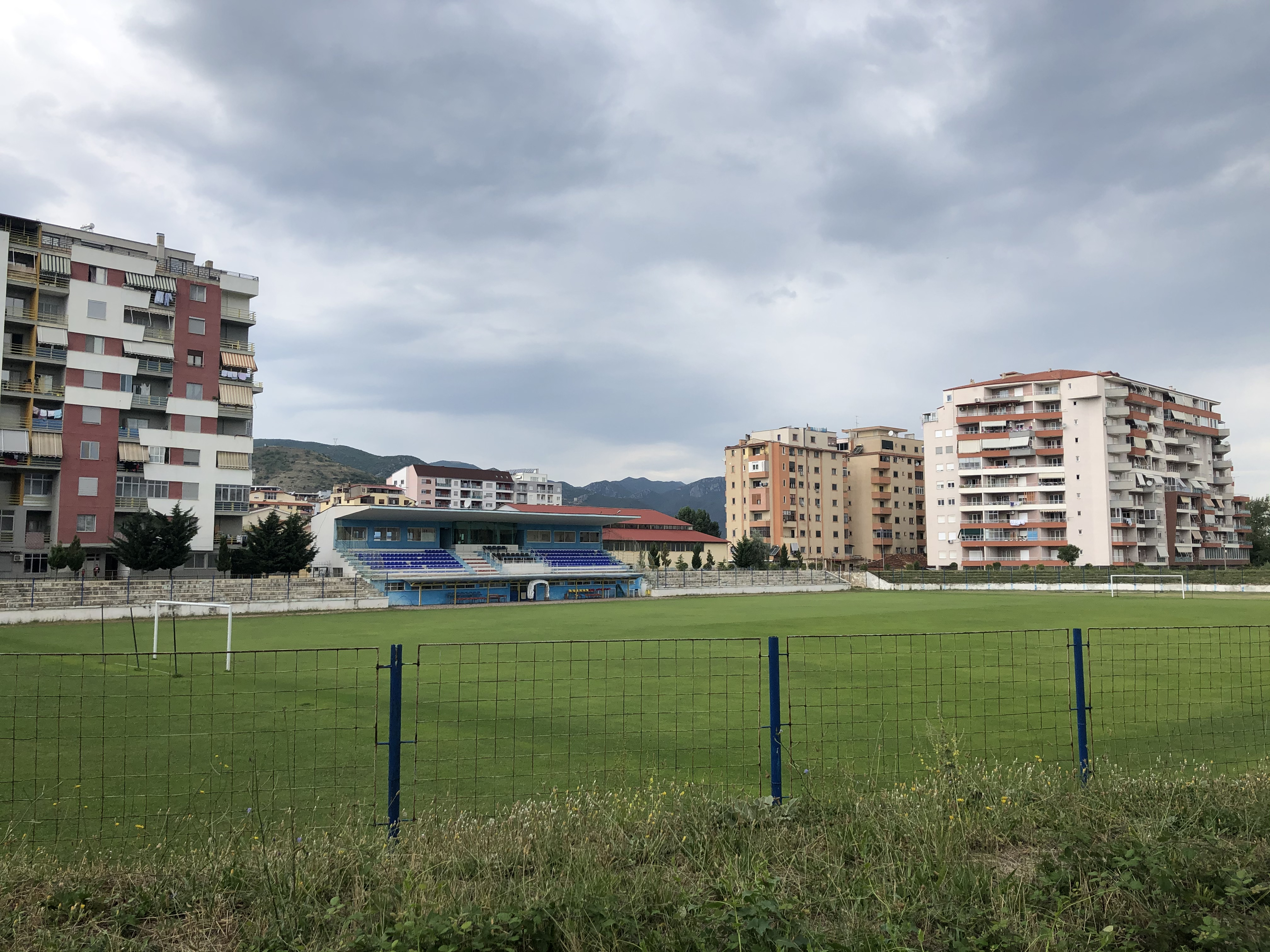
Gjorgji Kyçyku Stadium

The club has played its home matches at the Gjorgji Kyçyku Stadium since 1932.

== Staff ==
Role	Staff
Chairman	(Albania) Ilir Xhakolli
Coach	(Albania) Dritan Mehmeti
Assistant coach	(Albania) Gentjan Muska
Doctor	(Albania) Besnik Tira
Physiotherapist	(Albania) Arben Shkëmbi
Physiotherapist	(Albania) Alma Angjo

=== Recent seasons ===
Season	Division	Pos.	Pl.	W	D	L	GS	GA	P	Cup	Top Score
2010–11	Kategoria e Parë	1	30	22	2	6	56	27	68	FR	(Kosovo) Isa Eminhaziri 13
2011–12	Kategoria Superiore	13	26	6	4	16	25	47	19	SR	(Kosovo) Isa Eminhaziri 7
2012–13	Kategoria e Parë	5	30	13	3	14	49	44	42	FR	(Albania) Enkelejd Pengu 11
2013–14	Kategoria e Parë	6	30	11	9	10	33	31	42	FR	(Albania) Albi Çekiçi 8
2014–15	Kategoria e Parë	8	27	8	7	12	21	29	31	SR	(Albania) Enkelejd Pengu 9
2015–16	Kategoria e Parë	2	27	20	3	4	51	24	63	FR	(Albania) Enkelejd Pengu 5 (Albania) Albi Çekiçi 5 (Brazil) Pericles (Albania) Eldjon Topllari 5
2016–17	Kategoria e Parë	3/3	26	10	8	8	31	28	29/24	FR	(Albania) Hermes Shkulaku 7
2017–18	Kategoria e Parë	4/5	26	10	5	11	33	39	27/22	SR	(Albania) Albi Çekiçi 14
2018–19	Kategoria e Parë	6/6	26	13	2	11	36	29	26/28	FR	(Albania) Eldjon Topllari 7
2019–20	Kategoria e Parë	1/2	24	14	4	6	39	24	39/46	FR	(Albania) Artion Alillari 11
2020–21	Kategoria e Parë	3/3	20	10	3	7	32	26	28/33	SR	(Albania) Eldjon Topllari 5
2021–22	Kategoria e Parë	13	30	10	8	12	32	37	38	SR	(Albania) Eldjon Topllari 11
2022–23	Kategoria e Dytë	2	22	16	5	1	62	13	53	FR	(Albania) Eldjon Topllari 16
2023–24	Kategoria e Dytë	1	20	16	4	0	40	11	52	R32	(Albania) Eldjon Topllari 8
2024–25	Kategoria e Parë	5	33	14	7	12	33	35	49	R32	(Kosovo) Festim Alidema 8
2025–26	Kategoria e Parë	3	33	20	8	5	63	31	68	R16	(Nigeria) Freeman Pius 10
2026–27	Kategoria e Parë										

== List of managers ==
- (Albania) Ilir Daja (01 Jul 2004 — 30 Aug 2005)
- (Albania) Ylli Çekiçi (01 Jul 2009 — 30 Jun 2012)
- (Albania) Ardian Abazaj (01 Jul 2012 — 09 Dec 2013)
- (Albania) Arben Mahmutaj (10 Dec 2013 — 17 Mar 2014)
- (Albania) Ardian Abazaj (18 Mar 2014 — 30 Jun 2015)
- (Albania) Gentian Stojku (15 Jul 2015 — 31 May 2016)
- (Albania) Festim Fetollari (01 Jul 2016 — 31 Jul 2019)
- (Albania) Ardian Abazaj (01 Aug 2019 — 31 May 2022)
- (Albania) Samuel Nikaj (20 Jul 2022 — 10 Nov 2024)
- (Albania) Ardian Mema (11 Nov 2024 — 6 Oct 2025)
- (Albania) Emiliano Cela (9 Oct 2025 — 11 Nov 2026)
- (Albania) Dritan Mehmeti (12 Nov 2026 —)
