= 2015–16 KF Tërbuni season =

Tërbuni Pukë
2015–16 season
- Chairman: Grand Frroku
- Manager: Samuel Nikaj (until 5 October 2015); Gino Gargano (from 5 October 2015 to 29 November 2015); Viktor Gjoni (from 29 November 2015)
- Stadium: Ismail Xhemali Stadium
- Kategoria Superiore: 10th
- Albanian Cup: Second round
Home colours	Away colours

This article covers the 2015–16 season for KF Tërbuni Pukë. They'll participate in the Kategoria Superiore and Albanian Cup.

== Competitions ==
=== Kategoria Superiore ===
==== League table ====
Pos	Team	Pld	W	D	L	GF	GA	GD	Pts	Qualification or relegation
6	Vllaznia	36	11	6	19	36	42	−6	39	
7	Laçi	36	8	12	16	30	48	−18	36	
8	Flamurtari (Note: Flamurtari were deducted three points.)	36	9	11	16	34	44	−10	35	
9	Bylis (R)	36	8	8	20	27	53	−26	32	Relegation to the 2016–17 Kategoria e Parë
10	Tërbuni (R)	36	4	6	26	22	81	−59	18	Relegation to the 2016–17 Kategoria e Parë

Source: Albanian Football Association (in Albanian), Soccerway
Rules for classification: 1) Points; 2) Head-to-head points; 3) Head-to-head goal difference; 4) Head-to-head goals scored; 5) Goal difference; 6) Goals scored; 7) Draw.
(R) Relegated

==== Results summary ====
Overall								Home						Away					
Pld	W	D	L	GF	GA	GD	Pts	W	D	L	GF	GA	GD	W	D	L	GF	GA	GD
36	4	6	26	22	81	−59	18	2	4	12	14	34	−20	2	2	14	8	47	−39

Last updated: 18 May 2016.

==== Results by round ====
Round	1	2	3	4	5	6	7	8	9	10	11	12	13	14	15	16	17	18	19	20	21	22	23	24	25	26	27	28	29	30	31	32	33	34	35	36
Ground	H	A	H	A	H	A	H	A	H	A	H	A	H	A	H	A	H	A	H	A	H	A	H	A	H	A	H	A	H	A	H	A	H	A	H	A
Result	L	W	L	L	L	L	L	L	D	L	W	L	L	L	W	L	D	L	L	L	L	L	D	D	L	L	D	L	L	W	L	L	L	L	L	D
Position	7	5	6	8	8	8	9	9	10	10	8	8	10	10	9	10	10	10	10	10	10	10	10	10	10	10	10	10	10	10	10	10	10	10	10	10

Source: Soccerway
A = Away; H = Home; W = Win; D = Draw; L = Loss

==== Matches ====
23 August 2015 1	Tërbuni Pukë	1–2	Tirana	Pukë
17:00	Danaj (yellow card) 1'; Malindi 22'; Peqini (yellow card) 55'	Report	Lika 40'; Gilberto (yellow card) 47'; Fukui 68'; Karabeci (yellow card) 79'	Stadium: Ismail Xhemali Stadium; Attendance: 1,200; Referee: Bardhyl Pashaj

30 August 2015 2	Bylis Ballsh	0–2	Tërbuni Pukë	Gjirokastër
17:00	Asani (yellow card) 22'; Tairi (yellow card) 38'; Basriu (yellow card) 47'; Shosha (red card) 60'	Report	Danaj 37'; Lila (yellow card) 46'; Tusha (yellow card) 57' (yellow-red card) 60'; Gërxho (yellow card) 74'; Sulmataj 77'; Brahja (yellow card) 81'; Vatnikaj (yellow card) 86'	Stadium: Gjirokastra Stadium; Attendance: 400; Referee: Laver Alla

12 September 2015 3	Tërbuni Pukë	0–2	Skënderbeu Korçë	Pukë
13:00	Milenković (yellow card) 58'; Gebor (yellow card) 63'	Report	Abazi (yellow card) 37'; Arapi (yellow card) 42'; Olayinka 48', 86'; Berisha (yellow card) 67'	Stadium: Ismail Xhemali Stadium; Attendance: 1,000; Referee: Edvaldo Durmishi

19 September 2015 4	Teuta Durrës	3–1	Tërbuni Pukë	Durrës
16:00	Lamçja 11' (yellow card) 57'; Magani 35'; Hodo (yellow card) 35'; Gripshi 90'	Report	Dhrami 16'; Karapici (yellow card) 16'; Peqini (yellow card) 24'; Gavazaj (yellow card) 42'	Stadium: Niko Dovana Stadium; Attendance: 300; Referee: Blerim Ziri

26 September 2015 5	Tërbuni Pukë	1–2	Partizani Tirana	Pukë
13:00	Lila (yellow card) 32'; Milenković (yellow card) 43'; Bicaj 56' (o.g.); Peqini (yellow card) 68'; Karapici (yellow card) 76'; Danaj (yellow card) 77'; Haxho (yellow card) 77'; Mone (yellow card) 80'	Report	Sukaj 27' (yellow card) 84'; Bicaj 77'; Mazrekaj (yellow card) 80'; Daja (yellow card) 90+3'	Stadium: Ismail Xhemali Stadium; Attendance: 1,000; Referee: Remzi Sadiku

4 October 2015 6	Flamurtari Vlorë	7–0	Tërbuni Pukë	Ballsh
13:00	Greca 3'; Tskhadadze (yellow card) 10' (goal) 54'; Pashaj (yellow card) 16'; Nexhipi 27'; Zeqiri 48'; Telushi 67'; Morina 70'; Fuštar 84'	Report	Milenković (yellow card) 8'; Brahja (yellow card) 14'; Rexha (yellow card) 28'; Sulmataj (yellow card) 59'	Stadium: Adush Muça Stadium; Attendance: 70; Referee: Eldorjan Hamiti

17 October 2015 7	Tërbuni Pukë	0–3	Vllaznia Shkodër	Pukë
14:00	Karakaçi (yellow card) 17'; Peqini (yellow card) 35'; Rexha (yellow card) 57' (yellow-red card) 64'; Karapici (red card) 65'; Marku (yellow card) 78'	Report	Shtubina 1'; Arbri (yellow card) 17'; Sosa 56'; Pavićević 85'	Stadium: Ismail Xhemali Stadium; Attendance: 600; Referee: Adrian Beqiri

25 October 2015 8	Kukësi	1–0	Tërbuni Pukë	Kukës
13:00	Mateus Lima 10'; Musolli (yellow card) 35'	Report	Gavazaj (yellow card) 24'; Lila (yellow card) 48'	Stadium: Zeqir Ymeri Stadium; Attendance: 700; Referee: Olsi Sokoli

31 October 2015 9	Tërbuni Pukë	1–1	Laçi	Pukë
14:00	Dhrami 45+1'; Mone (yellow card) 65'; Milenković (yellow card) 77'; Vatnikaj (yellow card) 87'	Report	Mustafa 40'	Stadium: Ismail Xhemali Stadium; Attendance: 1,000; Referee: Klajdi Kola

7 November 2015 10	Tirana	3–0	Tërbuni Pukë	Tirana
14:00	Karan 8'; Bakaj 48' (yellow card) 58'; Lika 67'	Report	Karapici (yellow card) 87'	Stadium: Qemal Stafa Stadium; Attendance: 2,000; Referee: Kreshnik Cjapi

18 November 2015 11	Tërbuni Pukë	4–2	Bylis Ballsh	Pukë
14:00	Tusha 12'; Vatnikaj 40', 45'; Marku 80'	Report	Pepa 53'; Papa 84'	Stadium: Ismail Xhemali Stadium; Attendance: 1,000; Referee: Andi Koçi

22 November 2015 12	Skënderbeu Korçë	4–0	Tërbuni Pukë	Korçë
16:00	Salihi 17'; Berisha 19'; Progni 57', 90+1'	Report		Stadium: Skënderbeu Stadium; Attendance: 500; Referee: Blerim Ziri

28 November 2015 13	Tërbuni Pukë	0–1	Teuta Durrës	Pukë
13:00	Marku (yellow card) 33'; Milenković (yellow card) 85'	Report	Shkalla (yellow card) 45'; Magani 52'	Stadium: Ismail Xhemali Stadium; Attendance: 300; Referee: Kreshnik Cjapi

2 December 2015 14	Partizani Tirana	4–0	Tërbuni Pukë	Tirana
17:00	Ibrahimi 31'; Račić (yellow card) 40' (goal) 49', 62'; Sukaj 58'	Report	Tusha (yellow card) 27'; Rexha (yellow card) 28'; Sulollari (yellow card) 44'	Stadium: Qemal Stafa Stadium; Attendance: 1,500; Referee: Eldorjan Hamiti

6 December 2015 15	Tërbuni Pukë	1–0	Flamurtari Vlorë	Pukë
13:00	Malindi (yellow card) 50' (goal) 67'; Milenković (yellow card) 52'; Peqini (yellow card) 88'	Report	Telushi (yellow card) 3'; Greca (yellow card) 41'	Stadium: Ismail Xhemali Stadium; Attendance: 300; Referee: Andi Koçi

12 December 2015 16	Vllaznia Shkodër	2–0	Tërbuni Pukë	Shkodër
14:00	Hadžibulić (yellow card) 6'; Çinari 11' (yellow card) 42'; Arbri (yellow card) 45'; Ahmeti 60'; Pjeshka (yellow card) 81'	Report	Malindi (red card) 6'; Karakaçi (yellow card) 21'; Rexha (yellow card) 36'	Stadium: Reshit Rusi Stadium; Attendance: 1,100; Referee: Bardhyl Pashaj

19 December 2015 17	Tërbuni Pukë	1–1	Kukësi	Pukë
13:00	Prendi (yellow card) 24'; Rudović (yellow card) 49'; Dhrami 64'; Marku (yellow card) 78'	Report	Mateus Lima 77'; Jonuzi (yellow card) 90+4'	Stadium: Ismail Xhemali Stadium; Attendance: 250; Referee: Kridens Meta

23 December 2015 18	Laçi	4–0	Tërbuni Pukë	Laç
14:00	Nimani 44'; Adeniyi 51' (pen.), 60'; Gocaj 83' (yellow card) 85'	Report	Danaj (red card) 38'; Karapici (yellow card) 75'	Stadium: Laçi Stadium; Attendance: 500; Referee: Edvaldo Durmishi

=== Albanian Cup ===
==== First round ====
16 September 2015 First leg	Burreli	0–0	Tërbuni Pukë	Burrel
15:00	Puka (yellow card) 43'; Kaloshi (yellow card) 70'	Report	Rudović (yellow card) 83'	Stadium: Liri Ballabani Stadium; Attendance: 30; Referee: Indrit Myrtja

30 September 2015 Second leg	Tërbuni Pukë	2–0 (2–0 agg.)	Burreli	Pukë
14:30	Marku 16' (yellow card) 69'; Gërxho 50'; Sulmataj (yellow card) 68'	Report		Stadium: Ismail Xhemali Stadium; Attendance: 70; Referee: Edvin Hoxha

==== Second round ====
21 October 2015 First leg	Tërbuni Pukë	0–1	Flamurtari Vlorë	Pukë
13:30	Sulmataj (yellow card) 38'; Rexha (yellow card) 84'	Report	Fuštar 19'; Trapp (yellow card) 79'	Stadium: Ismail Xhemali Stadium; Attendance: 150; Referee: Erald Demiraj

4 November 2015 Second leg	Flamurtari Vlorë	5–0 (6–0 agg.)	Tërbuni Pukë	Vlorë
14:00	Fuštar (yellow card) 11'; Shehaj 36', 40', 58'; Morina 70'; Bregu 80'	Report	Gebor (yellow card) 37'; Peqini (red card) 44'	Stadium: Flamurtari Stadium; Attendance: 100; Referee: Blerim Ziri
