= Bruno Kepi =

Albanian footballer

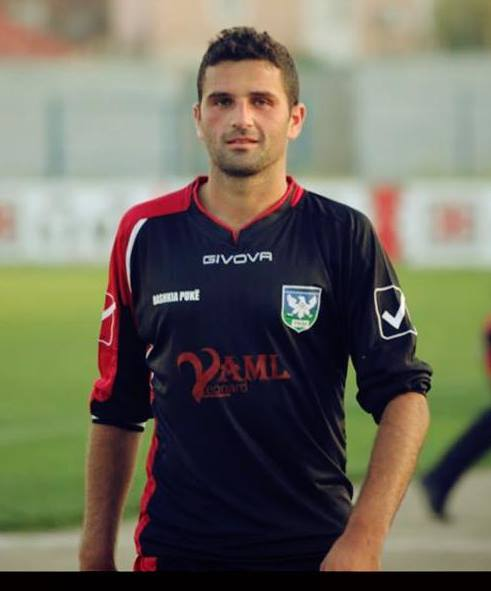

Personal information
- Full name: Bruno Kepi
- Date of birth: 4 October 1988 (age 38)
- Place of birth: Shkodër, Albania
- Height: 1.83 m (6 ft 0 in)
- Position: Defender

Youth career
- Vllaznia

Senior career*
Years	Team	Apps	(Gls)
2007–2009	Vllaznia	0	(0)
2008	→ Skënderbeu (loan)	14	(0)
2008–2009	→ Tërbuni (loan)	13	(1)
2009	→ Ada (loan)	6	(0)
2010–2011	Bylis	23+	(1)
2011–2012	Besëlidhja	52	(2)
2013–2015	Tërbuni	39	(4)
2015–2016	Kastrioti	22	(2)
- * Club domestic league appearances and goals

Bruno Kepi (born 4 October 1988 in Shkodër) is an Albanian former professional footballer who played as a defender.

== Club career ==
=== Tërbuni Pukë ===
On 31 August 2013, Kepi was transferred to Tërbuni Pukë by signing a 12-month contract. He made his debut on the same day by starting in the opening league match against Elbasani, which finished in a 2–1 away defeat. Following this, Kepi become a regular starter in the lineup, becoming a fan favourite in the process. His first score-sheet contributions came later on 19 October when he scored the winner in the match against Tomori Berat for the matchday 7. His second goal came on 7 December in the match against Pogradeci, netting the third in a 3–1 home win, giving the team another three points in their bid to achieve protomion. On 15 March of the following year, Kepi netted his third of the season, another matchwinner, as Tërbuni defeated Burreli. Kepi finished his first Tërbuni season by making 27 league appearances, in addition 1 cup appearance, as Tërbuni finished third in league, failing to secure a spot for top flight next season and was eliminated in the first round of Albanian Cup by Apolonia Fier.

Terbuni were promoted from the Northern Division of the Albanian First Division to the Superliga during the 2014/15 season. The final game of the season was against KS Besëlidhja Lezhë which will have decided who would be promoted to the Superliga. Terbuni needed a win or a draw, whilst Beselidhja needed a win. Kepi held the team on his shoulders as he was deliberate in keeping the ball in the other half by ensuring no goals against Terbuni. The game ended 2–0 in favour of Tërbuni, goals coming in the first half by Senad Lekaj and in the second half by Taulant Marku. Tërbuni ended the 2014–15 Albanian First Division season in the Northern division with 21 wins, 6 draws and 0 losses. They then faced the winners from the Southern Division, KF Bylis Ballsh at Elbasan Arena for the First Division cup, but lost 2–0. For the first time in their history, they appeared in the Superliga in the 2015–16 Albanian Superliga.

On 29 May 2014, Kepi agreed a contract extension with the club, signing until June 2015. He kicked off 2014–15 season by playing full 90 minutes as Tërbuni started the season with a 1–1 draw at Besa Kavajë. Kepi's first goal came later in the third matchday as Tërbuni achieved a hard-fought win against Iliria Fushë-Krujë, winning 4–2 after being behind in the first half. Tërbuni finished the first half of the season as Winter Champions after winning 1–0 against the same opponent on 20 December.

=== Kastrioti Krujë ===
On 24 July 2015, Kepi completed a transfer to Kastrioti Krujë as a free agent by penning a one-year contract.

== International career ==
Kepi was a former Albania youth international, representing under-12, -17 and -21 sides.
