= Enco Malindi =

Albanian footballer

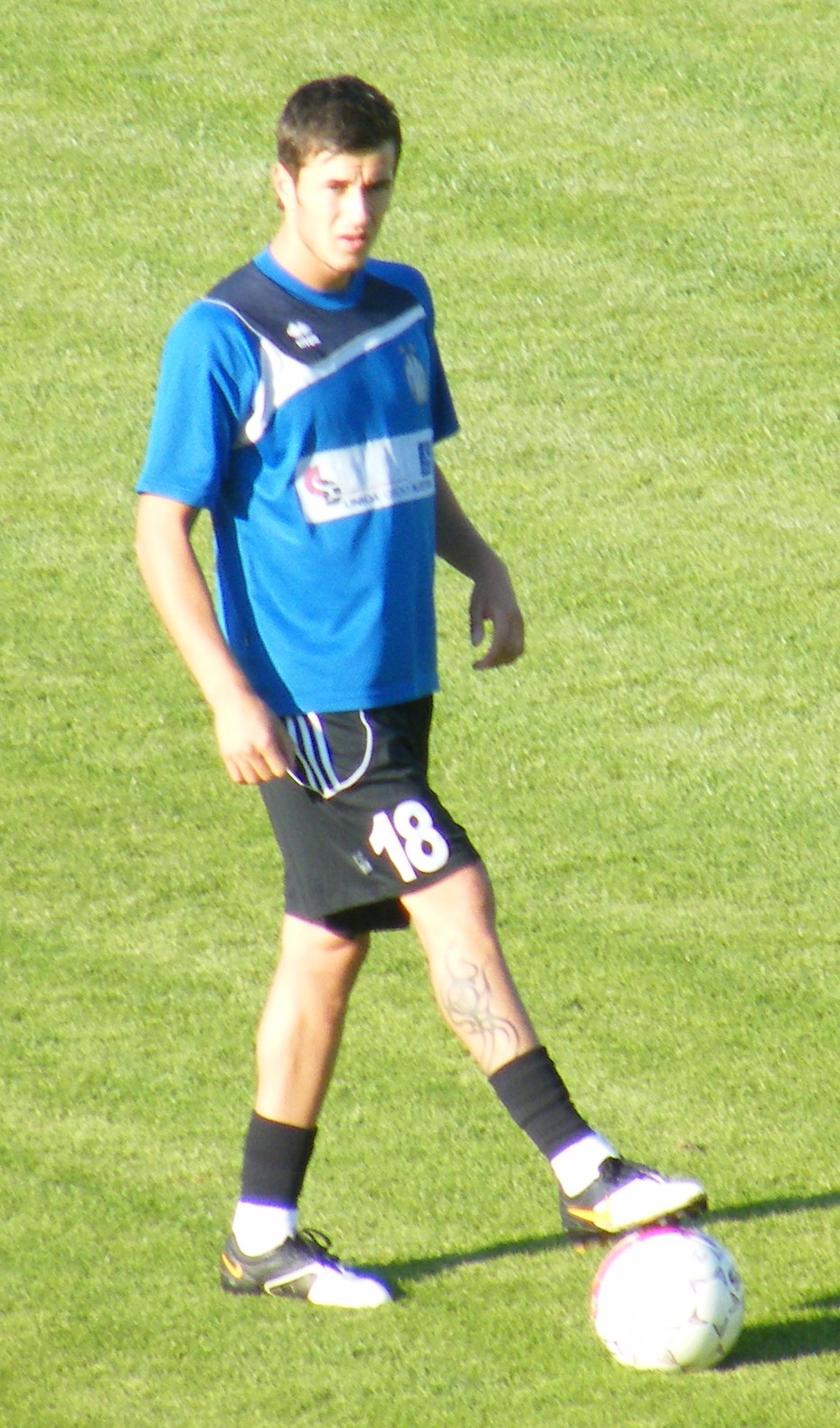

Personal information
- Date of birth: 15 January 1988 (age 38)
- Place of birth: Tirana, Albania
- Height: 1.85 m (6 ft 1 in)
- Position: Forward

Youth career
- 2004–2006: Partizani Tirana

Senior career*
Years	Team	Apps	(Gls)
2006–2007	Partizani	28	(9)
2007–2008	Slavia Sofia	10	(2)
2008–2009	Spartak Varna	19	(0)
2009	Tirana	6	(0)
2010	Skënderbeu	13	(2)
2010	Tirana	4	(1)
2011	Akademik Sofia	10	(1)
2011	Locarno	11	(1)
2012	Kamza	10	(0)
2012–2013	Kukësi	23	(2)
2013–2014	Kastrioti	22	(3)
2014–2015	Elbasani	23	(1)
2015–2016	Tërbuni	10	(2)
2016	Laçi	16	(0)
2017	Kamza	12	(3)
2017–2018	Kastrioti	21	(1)

International career
2004	Albania U-17	3	(1)
2006	Albania U-19	3	(2)
2007–2008	Albania U-21	12	(1)
- * Club domestic league appearances and goals

Enco Malindi (born 15 January 1988) is an Albanian former professional footballer who played as a forward.

== Early life ==
Malindi was born on 15 January 1988.

== Club career ==
=== Early career ===
Malindi started his career in his home town of Tirana with local team Partizani Tirana. After playing well in Albania he was spotted by the Bulgarian club Slavia Sofia. Malindi completed a move to Slavia Sofia in early 2008 for a total fee of €80,000.

=== Slavia Sofia ===
He joined Slavia Sofia in March 2008 and made his official debut for the club in a match against Chernomorets Burgas on 30 March 2008, playing 60 minutes, with the match finishing 1–1. During his spell at the club, Malindi wore the number 99 shirt.

=== Spartak Varna ===
On 29 July 2008, Malindi signed with PFC Spartak Varna for a fee of €50,000. He made his unofficial debut for the falcons one day later in a match against Chernomorets Balchik by playing 45 minutes and scoring one goal. The result of the match was 2–0. During the 2008–09 season, he appeared in 20 matches.

=== Kukësi ===
On 6 July 2012, Malindi joined Kukësi on a free transfer for the upcoming 2012–13 season, the club's first ever Albanian Superliga season, signing a one-year contract.

=== Kastrioti Krujë ===
On 2 September 2013, Malindi signed a one-year contract with Kastrioti Krujë, his sixth Albanian club. The team struggled for results and was relegated back to Albanian First Division at the end of the season, which led Malindi to terminate his contract by mutual consensus.

=== Elbasani ===
At the end of the season, Elbasani was relegated back to Albanian First Division which led Malindi to terminate his cooperating with the club on 29 May 2015.

=== Tërbuni Pukë ===
On 22 July 2015, Malindi signed a contract with the newly promoted side Tërbuni Pukë in its first ever Albanian Superliga season. He made his debut on 23 August in team's opening league match of the season against Tirana, scoring the club's first ever Albanian Superliga goal in an eventual 2–1 home defeat.

=== Laçi ===
On 4 January 2016, Malindi agreed personal terms and signed a contract until the end of 2015–16 season with Laçi, taking the squad number 17. He was called up to the team for the first time on 23 January for the first leg of quarter-final of 2015–16 Albanian Cup against Partizani Tirana, where he was an unused substitute in a 2–0 home win. Malindi made his competitive debut seven days later versus the same opponent at Qemal Stafa Stadium, playing 85 minutes before was sent-off. He left the club in December 2016 after terminating the contract by mutual consent.

=== Return to Kamza ===
On 7 January 2017, Malidi agreed personal terms and returned to Kamza, this time in Albanian First Division.

=== Return to Kastrioti Krujë ===
On 26 July 2017, Kastrioti announced that they have acquired the services of six players, including Malindi, for the 2017–18 season.

== International career ==
Malindi represented Albania at youth levels, playing for the under-17, U19 and U21.

== Career statistics ==
As of 17 December 2017

Appearances and goals by club, season and competition
Club	Season	League			Cup		Europe		Total	
Club	Season	Division	Apps	Goals	Apps	Goals	Apps	Goals	Apps	Goals
Partizani Tirana	2005–06	Albanian Superliga	0	0	0	0	—		0	0
Partizani Tirana	2006–07	Albanian Superliga	11	2	0	0	—		11	2
Partizani Tirana	2007–08	Albanian Superliga	17	0	1	1	—		18	1
Partizani Tirana	Total		28	2	1	1	—		29	3
Slavia Sofia	2007–08	Bulgarian First League	10	2	0	0	—		10	2
Spartak Varna	2008–09	Bulgarian First League	19	0	1	0	—		20	0
Tirana	2009–10	Albanian Superliga	6	0	1	0	—		7	0
Tirana	2010–11	Albanian Superliga	4	1	3	2	4 (Note: Appearance(s) in UEFA Europa League)	0	11	3
Tirana	Total		10	1	4	2	4	0	18	3
Skënderbeu Korçë (loan)	2009–10	Albanian Superliga	13	3	3	0	—		16	2
Akademik Sofia	2010–11	Bulgarian First League	11	1	0	0	—		11	1
Locarno	2011–12	Swiss Challenge League	11	1	0	0	—		11	1
Kamza	2011–12	Albanian Superliga	11 (Note: Including one appearance in Albanian Superliga relegation play-off)	0	6	0	—		17	0
Kukësi	2012–13	Albanian Superliga	23	2	7	0	—		30	2
Kukësi	2013–14	Albanian Superliga	—		—		7	0	7	0
Kukësi	Total		23	2	7	0	7	0	37	2
Kastrioti Krujë	2013–14	Albanian Superliga	22	3	3	2	—		25	5
Elbasani	2014–15	Albanian Superliga	23	1	3	0	—		26	1
Tërbuni Pukë	2015–16	Albanian Superliga	10	2	2	0	—		12	2
Laçi	2015–16	Albanian Superliga	10	0	2	0	—		12	0
Laçi	2016–17	Albanian Superliga	6	0	1	1	—		7	1
Laçi	Total		16	0	3	1	—		19	1
Kamza	2016–17	Albanian First Division	12	3	0	0	—		12	3
Kastrioti Krujë	2017–18	Albanian First Division	11	1	0	0	—		11	1
Career total			230	21	35	6	11	0	276	27
