= Magani (surname) =

Magani is a surname. Notable people with the surname include:

- Artur Magani (born 1994), Albanian footballer, son of Gugash and brother of Endrien
- Endrien Magani (born 1991), Albanian footballer
- Gugash Magani (born 1965), Albanian footballer and manager
