= 2012–13 Albanian Cup =

Kupa e Shqipërisë

Tournament details
- Country: Albania
- Teams: 38

Final positions
- Champions: Laçi
- Runners-up: Bylis

Tournament statistics
- Matches played: 77
- Goals scored: 227 (2.95 per match)

2012–13 Albanian Cup (Albanian: Kupa e Shqipërisë) was the sixty-first season of Albania's annual cup competition. Laçi, the winners of the competition qualified for the first qualifying round of the 2013–14 UEFA Europa League. KF Tirana were the defending champions, but were eliminated by Kukësi in the second round.

Apart from the quarter-finals, the ties are played in a two-legged format similar to those of European competitions. If the aggregate score is tied after both games, the team with the higher number of away goals advances. If the number of away goals is equal in both games, the match is decided by extra time and a penalty shoot-out, if necessary.

== Preliminary tournament ==
In order to reduce the number of participating teams for the first round to 32, a preliminary tournament is played. Only teams from the Second Division (third level) are allowed to enter. In contrast to the main tournament, the preliminary tournament is held as a single-leg knock-out competition.

=== First preliminary round ===
These matches took place on 12 September 2012.

Team 1	Score	Team 2
Sukthi	2–1	Luzi 2008
Veleçiku	1–3	Olimpik
Gramozi	3–0	Tepelena
Skrapari	1–3	Albpetrol

=== Second preliminary round ===
These matches took place on 19 September 2012.

Team 1	Score	Team 2
Sukthi	1–2	Olimpik
Gramozi	3–0	Albpetrol

== First round ==
All 30 teams of the 2012–13 Superliga and First Division entered in this round along with the two qualifiers from the Second Preliminary Round. The first legs were played on 26 September 2012 and the second legs took place on 3 October 2012.

Team 1	Agg.	Team 2	1st leg	2nd leg
Naftëtari	1–5	Flamurtari	0–1	1–4
Tërbuni	0–3	Bylis	0–2	0–1
Adriatiku	0–3	Laçi	0–3	0–0
Ada	2–2	Tomori	2–1	0–1
Olimpik	4–9	Skënderbeu	2–2	2–7
Himara	1–4	Kastrioti	0–2	1–2
Iliria	1–4	Vllaznia	0–2	1–2
Butrinti	2–3	Shkumbini	2–0	0–3
Elbasani	0–1	Apolonia	0–0	0–1
Besëlidhja	4–5	Kukësi	2–4	2–1
Dinamo Tirana	0–2	Kamza	0–1	0–1
Gramozi	0–7	Teuta	0–4	0–3
Gramshi	1–5	Luftëtari	1–0	0–5
Burreli	2–10	Besa	1–4	1–6
Lushnja	7–0	Pogradeci	5–0	2–0
Partizani	1–3	Tirana	1–2	0–1

== Second round ==
All 16 qualified teams from First Round progressed to the second round. The first legs were played on 24 October 2012 and the second legs took place on 7 November 2012.

Team 1	Agg.	Team 2	1st leg	2nd leg
Besa	1–2	Flamurtari	0–1	1–1
Luftëtari	3–4	Bylis	2–1	1-3
Tomori	1–3	Laçi	0–0	1–3
Kukësi	6–3	Tirana	4–0	2–3
Kamza	0–4	Skënderbeu	0–1	0–3
Apolonia	1–2	Kastrioti	1–2	0–0
Shkumbini	2–2	Vllaznia	1–0	1–2
Lushnja	2–4	Teuta	0–0	2–4

== Quarter-finals ==
The 8 winners from the second round were placed in 2 groups of 4 teams each. Each group played a double round robin schedule for a total of 6 games for each team. The top 2 teams in each group advanced to the next round of the competition. These matches took place between 4 December 2012 and 5 March 2013.

=== Group A ===
Pos	Team	Pld	W	D	L	GF	GA	GD	Pts	Qualification	SKË	KUK	KAS	SHK
1	Skënderbeu	6	6	0	0	21	8	+13	18	Advance to semi-finals		4–2	5–1	3–1
2	Kukësi	6	4	0	2	12	7	+5	12	Advance to semi-finals	2–3		1–0	2–0
3	Kastrioti	6	2	0	4	8	13	−5	6		1–2	0–3		4–2
4	Shkumbini	6	0	0	6	4	17	−13	0		1–4	0–2	0–2	

Source: Soccerway
Legend: Blue = home team win; Yellow = draw; Red = away team win.
Rules for classification: 1) points; 2) goal difference; 3) number of goals scored.

=== Group B ===
Pos	Team	Pld	W	D	L	GF	GA	GD	Pts	Qualification	BYL	LAÇ	FLA	TEU
1	Bylis	6	4	0	2	15	9	+6	12	Advance to semi-finals		2–1	2–3	5–0
2	Laçi	6	4	0	2	12	7	+5	12	Advance to semi-finals	3–2		1–0	4–0
3	Flamurtari	6	4	0	2	11	7	+4	12		0–1	2–1		3–0
4	Teuta	6	0	0	6	5	20	−15	0		2–3	1–2	2–3	

Source: Soccerway
Legend: Blue = home team win; Yellow = draw; Red = away team win.
Rules for classification: 1) points; 2) goal difference; 3) number of goals scored.

== Semi-finals ==
The four winners from the quarter-finals competed in this round. The matches took place on 3 and 17 April 2013.

Team 1	Agg.	Team 2	1st leg	2nd leg
Kukësi	1–2	Laçi	0–0	1–2
Skënderbeu	1–2	Bylis	1–1	0–1

3 April 2013	Kukësi	0–0	Laçi	Zeqir Ymeri Stadium, Kukës
13:00 CEST		Report		Attendance: 4,000; Referee: Emirjon Sino

17 April 2013	Laçi	2−1	Kukësi	Laçi Stadium, Laçi
14:00 CEST	Nimani 33'; Çela 79'	Report	Peqini 65'	Attendance: 2,000; Referee: Bardhyl Pashaj

Laçi advanced to the final.

3 April 2013	Skënderbeu	1–1	Bylis	Skënderbeu Stadium, Korçë
16:00 CEST	Lilaj 86'	Report	Olayinka 81'	Attendance: 4,000; Referee: Bardhyl Pashaj

17 April 2013	Bylis	1−0	Skënderbeu	Adush Muça Stadium, Ballsh
14:00 CEST	Gërxho 52'	Report		Attendance: 2,000; Referee: Enea Jorgji

Bylis advanced to the final.

== Final ==
17 May 2013
20:00

Laçi	1−0 (a.e.t.)	Bylis
Çela 119'	Report

Qemal Stafa Stadium, Tirana
Attendance: 9,000
Referee: Bardhyl Pashaj
