= Mergent Sulmataj =

Albanian footballer

Personal information
- Full name: Mergent Sulmataj
- Date of birth: 16 October 1996 (age 30)
- Place of birth: Kukës, Albania
- Position: Forward

Youth career
- 2011–2013: FK Kukësi
- 2013–2015: Shkëndija Tiranë

Senior career*
Years	Team	Apps	(Gls)
2015–2017	Kukësi	0	(0)
2015	→ Tërbuni Pukë (loan)	5	(1)
2017	→ Turbina Cërrik (loan)	10	(2)
- * Club domestic league appearances and goals

Mergent Sulmataj (born 16 October 1996) is an Albanian football player who most recently played for Kukësi in the Albanian Superliga.

== Career ==
=== Early career ===
Sulmataj began playing his career with the youth team of his local club FK Kukësi, where he played until 2013 which is when he joined the Loro Boriçi sports mastery school and began playing for Shkëndija Tiranë, which is the school's football team. He was at the school and Shkëndija Tiranë for 2 years between 2013 and 2015, before joining newly promoted Albanian Superliga side Tërbuni Pukë as a professional player.

=== Professional career ===
Sulmataj made his professional debut on 30 August 2015 against Bylis Ballsh, where he came on as a 59th-minute substitute and scored the second goal in the 2–0 away win to hand Tërbuni Pukë their first-ever victory in the top flight. After scoring on his debut, he dedicated his goal to Tërbuni Pukë's head coach Samuel Nikaj as well as his coach Luan Pinari.

== Career statistics ==
=== Club ===
As of 31 August 2015

Club	Season	League			Cup		Europe		Other		Total	
Club	Season	Division	Apps	Goals	Apps	Goals	Apps	Goals	Apps	Goals	Apps	Goals
Tërbuni Pukë	2015–16	Albanian Superliga	1	1	0	0	—		—		1	1
Tërbuni Pukë	Total		1	1	0	0	—		—		1	1
Career total			1	1	0	0	—		—		1	1
