= Xhynejt Çutra =

Albanian footballer

Personal information
- Date of birth: 23 November 1988 (age 37)
- Place of birth: Tirana, Albania
- Height: 1.79 m (5 ft 10 in)
- Position: Midfielder

Team information
- Current team: Turbina (manager)

Senior career*
| Years | Team | Apps | (Gls) |
| 2007–2008 | Pogradeci | 30 | (12) |
| 2008–2009 | Olimpija Ljubljana | 24 | (8) |
| 2008–2009 | → Kamnik (loan) | | |
| 2009 | Radomlje | | |
| 2010 | Apolonia Fier | 11 | (3) |
| 2010 | Shkumbini | 4 | (0) |
| 2012–2013 | Besëlidhja | 17 | (4) |
| 2013 | Gramshi | 12 | (0) |
| 2013 | Bylis | 10 | (0) |
| 2014–2015 | Tërbuni | 37 | (3) |
| 2015–2016 | Dinamo Tirana | 11 | (0) |
| 2016–2018 | Kastrioti | 66 | (9) |
| 2019 | Turbina | 11 | (1) |
| 2019–2020 | Erzeni | 19 | (2) |
| 2020–2022 | Korabi | 49 | (1) |
| 2022–2023 | Valbona | | |
| 2023 | Turbina | | |

Managerial career
- 2024–: Turbina
- * Club domestic league appearances and goals

Xhynejt Çutra (born 23 November 1988) is an Albanian football coach and a former player who is the manager of Turbina. He went on trial with Dinamo Zagreb in January 2008 but was subsequently not offered a contract.
