= 1983–84 Kategoria e Dytë =

Kategoria e Dytë
- Season: 1983–84
- Champions: Besëlidhja
- Promoted: Besëlidhja
- Relegated: Përparimi; Tërbuni

The 1983–84 Kategoria e Dytë was the 37th season of a second-tier association football league in Albania.

== League table ==
Pos	Team	Pld	W	D	L	GF	GA	GD	Pts	Promotion or relegation
1	Besëlidhja (C, P)	26	16	7	3	41	17	+24	39	Promotion to 1984–85 National Championship
2	Apolonia	26	17	4	5	42	13	+29	38	Qualification to the Promotion playoff
3	Shkumbini	26	9	10	7	21	18	+3	28	
4	Kastrioti	26	11	6	9	28	28	0	28	
5	Shkëndija Tiranë	26	8	11	7	27	26	+1	27	
6	Korabi	26	10	6	10	27	25	+2	26	
7	Turbina	26	8	9	9	24	28	−4	25	
8	Minatori (T)	26	8	8	10	22	24	−2	24	
9	Erzeni	26	6	12	8	19	23	−4	24	
10	Vetëtima	26	10	4	12	27	32	−5	24	
11	Bistrica	26	10	4	12	20	31	−11	24	
12	Butrinti	26	10	3	13	29	33	−4	23	
13	Përparimi (R)	26	7	5	14	24	38	−14	19	Relegation to 1984–85 Kategoria e Tretë
14	Tërbuni (R)	26	5	5	16	24	39	−15	15	Relegation to 1984–85 Kategoria e Tretë

(C) Champions; (P) Promoted; (R) Relegated

== Relegation/promotion playoff ==
Team 1	Agg.	Team 2	1st leg	2nd leg
Traktori	2–1	Apolonia	2–0	0–1
