= Arbër Dhrami =

Albanian footballer

Personal information
- Full name: Arbër Dhrami
- Date of birth: 23 June 1988 (age 38)
- Place of birth: Fier, Albania
- Height: 1.77 m (5 ft 10 in)
- Position: Striker

Senior career*
Years	Team	Apps	(Gls)
–2007	Flamurtari Vlorë		
2008–2011	Apolonia Fier	40	(10)
2011–2013	Platanias	25	(1)
2013–2014	Himara	35	(16)
2014–2015	Butrinti Sarandë	7	(1)
2015	Bylis Ballsh	12	(3)
2015–2016	Tërbuni Pukë	15	(3)
2016	Luftëtari	13	(4)
2017	Pembroke Athleta	5	(1)
2017–2019	Oriku		
- * Club domestic league appearances and goals as of 13 December 2019

Arbër Dhrami (born 23 June 1988) is an Albanian professional footballer who plays as a striker.

== Club career ==
On 6 August 2015, Dhrami signed with the newly promoted club Tërbuni Pukë for an undisclosed fee, taking the vacant number 88 for the upcoming 2015–16 season.

Tërbuni commenced their first-ever Albanian Superliga season with a 1–2 home loss against KF Tirana during which Dhrami was substituted in the 47th minute for Roland Peqini.

Dhrami left the team during the winter transfer window, and on 12 January 2016, and signed with Luftëtari Gjirokastër of the Albanian First Division for the second part of the 2015–16 season. In January 201,7 he moved to Malta to play for thestruggling Premier League team Pembroke Athleta.
