= Ervis Koçi =

Albanian footballer

Personal information
- Full name: Ervis Koçi
- Date of birth: 13 November 1984 (age 41)
- Place of birth: Kukës, Albania
- Height: 1.84 m (6 ft 1/2 in)
- Position: Goalkeeper

Youth career
- 2000–2005: Besëlidhja Lezhë

Senior career*
| Years | Team | Apps | (Gls) |
| 2004–2005 | Besëlidhja | 20 | (0) |
| 2005–2007 | Kastrioti | 11 | (0) |
| 2007–2009 | Besëlidhja | 37 | (0) |
| 2009–2018 | Kukësi | 73 | (0) |
- * Club domestic league appearances and goals as of 22 December 2017

Ervis Koçi (born 13 November 1984) is an Albanian professional footballer who most recently played as a goalkeeper for Kukësi in the Albanian Superliga.

== Club career ==
He is the club's current longest serving player, having been a member of the squad since 2009 when they were playing in the Albanian Second Division, the third tier of Albanian football. Kukësi was promoted after finished second in the 2011–12 Albanian First Division and Koçi was rewarded with a new contract for his performances. He signed a contract for the 2012–13 season, the club's first ever top flight season.

Koçi was dropped to second choice in the 2012–13 following the acquisition of Argjent Halili, making only one appearance in league. That appearance came on 4 May 2013 in the penultimate matchday versus Kastrioti Krujë, keeping a clean sheet in the 0–3. He did, however, made 4 cup appearances as Kukësi was eliminated in semi-finals to Laçi.

== Career statistics ==
As of 22 December 2017

| Club | Season | League | | | Cup | | Europe | | Other | | Total | |
| Club | Season | Division | Apps | Goals | Apps | Goals | Apps | Goals | Apps | Goals | Apps | Goals |
|---|---|---|---|---|---|---|---|---|---|---|---|---|
| Kukësi | 2010–11 | Albanian Second Division | 14 | 0 | 0 | 0 | — | | — | | 14 | 0 |
| Kukësi | 2011–12 | Albanian First Division | 27 | 0 | 1 | 0 | — | | — | | 28 | 0 |
| Kukësi | 2012–13 | Albanian Superliga | 1 | 0 | 4 | 0 | — | | — | | 5 | 0 |
| Kukësi | 2013–14 | Albanian Superliga | 4 | 0 | 3 | 0 | 0 | 0 | — | | 7 | 0 |
| Kukësi | 2014–15 | Albanian Superliga | 2 | 0 | 1 | 0 | 0 | 0 | — | | 3 | 0 |
| Kukësi | 2015–16 | Albanian Superliga | 24 | 0 | 1 | 0 | 1 (Note: All appearance(s) in UEFA Europa League) | 0 | — | | 26 | 0 |
| Kukësi | 2016–17 | Albanian Superliga | 1 | 0 | 6 | 0 | 0 | 0 | 0 | 0 | 7 | 0 |
| Kukësi | 2017–18 | Albanian Superliga | 0 | 0 | 1 | 0 | 0 | 0 | 0 | 0 | 1 | 0 |
| Kukësi | Total | | 73 | 0 | 17 | 0 | 1 | 0 | 0 | 0 | 91 | 0 |
| Career total | | | 73 | 0 | 17 | 0 | 1 | 0 | 0 | 0 | 91 | 0 |

== Honours ==
Kukësi

- Albanian Superliga: 2016–17
- Albanian Cup: 2015–16
- Albanian Supercup: 2016
