= 2016–17 Kategoria e Parë =

Kategoria e Parë
- Season: 2016–17
- Champions: Kamza
- Promoted: Kamza; Lushnja
- Relegated: Sopoti; Adriatiku; Elbasani
- Top goalscorer: Armand Pasha (20)

The 2016–17 Kategoria e Parë was competed between 20 teams in 2 groups, A and B, respectively.

== Changes from last season (2015-16) ==
=== Team changes ===
==== From Kategoria e Parë ====
Promoted to Kategoria Superiore:

- Luftëtari
- Korabi

Relegated to Kategoria e Dytë:

- Ada
- Butrinti

==== To Kategoria e Parë ====
Relegated from Kategoria Superiore:

- Tërbuni
- Bylis

Promoted from Kategoria e Dytë:

- Tomori
- Shënkolli
- Adriatiku

=== Stadia by capacity and locations ===
==== Group A ====
Team	Location	Stadium	Capacity
Besa	Kavajë	Besa Stadium	8,000
Besëlidhja	Lezhë	Brian Filipi Stadium	5,000
Burreli	Burrel	Liri Ballabani Stadium	2,500
Erzeni	Shijak	Tofik Jashari Stadium	4,000
Iliria	Fushë-Krujë	Redi Maloku Stadium	3,000
Kamza	Kamëz	Kamëz Stadium	4,800
Kastrioti	Krujë	Kastrioti Stadium	8,400
Adriatiku	Mamurras	Mamurras Stadium	1,000
Tërbuni	Pukë	Ismail Xhemali Stadium	1,950
Shënkolli	Shënkoll	Kastrioti Stadium	8,400

==== Group B ====
Team	Location	Stadium	Capacity
Apolonia	Fier	Loni Papuçiu Stadium	6,800
Bylis	Ballsh	Adush Muça Stadium	5,200
Dinamo Tirana	Tirana	Selman Stërmasi Stadium	9,600
Elbasani	Elbasan	Elbasan Arena	12,800
Lushnja	Lushnjë	Abdurrahman Roza Haxhiu Stadium	8,500
Pogradeci	Pogradec	Gjorgji Kyçyku Stadium	10,700
Shkumbini	Peqin	Shkumbini Stadium	5,000
Sopoti	Librazhd	Sopoti Stadium	3,000
Tomori	Berat	Tomori Stadium	14,750
Turbina	Cërrik	Nexhip Trungu Stadium	6,600

== First phase ==
=== Group A ===
Pos	Team	Pld	W	D	L	GF	GA	GD	Pts	Qualification
1	Kamza	18	15	2	1	25	7	+18	47	Qualification to the Promotion round
2	Besëlidhja	18	11	6	1	26	11	+15	39	Qualification to the Promotion round
3	Erzeni	18	12	1	5	32	14	+18	37	Qualification to the Promotion round
4	Burreli	18	7	5	6	18	16	+2	26	Qualification to the Promotion round
5	Shënkolli	18	7	2	9	16	23	−7	23	Qualification to the Promotion round
6	Kastrioti	18	5	7	6	18	14	+4	22	Qualification to the Relegation round
7	Besa	18	5	3	10	10	18	−8	18	Qualification to the Relegation round
8	Adriatiku	18	3	5	10	12	25	−13	14	Qualification to the Relegation round
9	Iliria	18	3	5	10	12	26	−14	14	Qualification to the Relegation round
10	Tërbuni	18	2	4	12	6	21	−15	10	Qualification to the Relegation round

Source: Soccerway
Rules for classification: 1) points; 2) goal difference; 3) number of goals scored; 4) head-to-head points; 5) head-to-head goal difference; 6) draw. (Head-to-head record is applied for clubs with the same number of points only once all matches between said clubs have been played.)

=== Group B ===
Pos	Team	Pld	W	D	L	GF	GA	GD	Pts	Qualification
1	Lushnja	18	12	5	1	31	12	+19	41	Qualification to the Promotion round
2	Bylis	18	11	5	2	23	10	+13	38	Qualification to the Promotion round
3	Pogradeci	18	8	5	5	21	16	+5	29	Qualification to the Promotion round
4	Tomori	18	6	5	7	11	12	−1	23	Qualification to the Promotion round
5	Shkumbini	18	7	1	10	10	18	−8	22	Qualification to the Promotion round
6	Apolonia	18	6	4	8	19	20	−1	22	Qualification to the Relegation round
7	Turbina	18	6	3	9	16	20	−4	21	Qualification to the Relegation round
8	Dinamo Tirana	18	4	6	8	12	13	−1	18	Qualification to the Relegation round
9	Sopoti	18	2	10	6	17	26	−9	16	Qualification to the Relegation round
10	Elbasani	18	4	4	10	15	28	−13	16	Qualification to the Relegation round

Source: Soccerway
Rules for classification: 1) points; 2) goal difference; 3) number of goals scored; 4) head-to-head points; 5) head-to-head goal difference; 6) draw. (Head-to-head record is applied for clubs with the same number of points only once all matches between said clubs have been played.)

== Second phase ==
=== Promotion round ===
==== Group A ====
Pos	Team	Pld	W	D	L	GF	GA	GD	Pts	Promotion
1	Kamza (C, P)	8	4	4	0	12	6	+6	40	Promotion to 2017–18 Kategoria Superiore
2	Besëlidhja	8	6	2	0	14	3	+11	40	
3	Erzeni	8	1	2	5	13	21	−8	24	
4	Burreli	8	2	2	4	11	12	−1	21	
5	Shënkolli	8	0	4	4	11	19	−8	16	

Source: Soccerway
Rules for classification: 1) points; 2) goal difference; 3) number of goals scored; 4) head-to-head points; 5) head-to-head goal difference; 6) draw. (Head-to-head record is applied for clubs with the same number of points only once all matches between said clubs have been played.)
(C) Champions; (P) Promoted

==== Group B ====
Pos	Team	Pld	W	D	L	GF	GA	GD	Pts	Promotion
1	Lushnja (P)	8	6	2	0	13	6	+7	41	Promotion to 2017–18 Kategoria Superiore
2	Bylis	8	6	1	1	17	5	+12	38	
3	Pogradeci	8	2	3	3	10	12	−2	24	
4	Shkumbini	8	1	2	5	8	18	−10	16	
5	Tomori	8	1	0	7	10	17	−7	15	

Source: Soccerway
Rules for classification: 1) points; 2) goal difference; 3) number of goals scored; 4) head-to-head points; 5) head-to-head goal difference; 6) draw. (Head-to-head record is applied for clubs with the same number of points only once all matches between said clubs have been played.)
(P) Promoted

=== Relegation round ===
==== Group A ====
Pos	Team	Pld	W	D	L	GF	GA	GD	Pts	Relegation
6	Iliria	8	4	1	3	10	10	0	20	
7	Kastrioti	8	3	0	5	9	11	−2	20	
8	Besa	8	3	2	3	8	8	0	20	
9	Tërbuni	8	4	2	2	7	5	+2	19	Play-out relegation to 2017–18 Kategoria e Dytë
10	Adriatiku (R)	8	3	1	4	8	8	0	17	Relegation to 2017–18 Kategoria e Dytë

Source: Soccerway
Rules for classification: 1) points; 2) goal difference; 3) number of goals scored; 4) head-to-head points; 5) head-to-head goal difference; 6) draw. (Head-to-head record is applied for clubs with the same number of points only once all matches between said clubs have been played.)
(R) Relegated

==== Group B ====
Pos	Team	Pld	W	D	L	GF	GA	GD	Pts	Relegation
6	Apolonia	8	4	3	1	17	9	+8	26	
7	Turbina	8	3	2	3	13	12	+1	22	
8	Dinamo Tirana	8	2	4	2	6	8	−2	19	
9	Sopoti (R)	8	2	3	3	8	9	−1	17	Play-out relegation to 2017–18 Kategoria e Dytë
10	Elbasani (R)	8	1	4	3	11	17	−6	15	Relegation to 2017–18 Kategoria e Dytë

Source: Soccerway
Rules for classification: 1) points; 2) goal difference; 3) number of goals scored; 4) head-to-head points; 5) head-to-head goal difference; 6) draw. (Head-to-head record is applied for clubs with the same number of points only once all matches between said clubs have been played.)
(R) Relegated

== Final ==
26 May 2017
16:30 CEST

Lushnja	0–0	Kamza
	Report
Penalties
	3–4

Elbasan Arena, Elbasan
Referee: Kridens Meta

== Relegation play-offs ==
18 May 2017
16:00 CEST

Tërbuni	2–0	Oriku
Prendi 47'; Taku 53'	Report

Elbasan Arena, Elbasan
Attendance: 1,000
Referee: Edvaldo Durmishi

19 May 2017
16:00 CEST

Sopoti	0–0 (a.e.t.)	Vllaznia B
	Report
Penalties
	3–4

Abdurrahman Roza Haxhiu Stadium, Lushnjë
Attendance: 200
Referee: Olsid Ferataj
