= Senad Lekaj =

Albanian footballer

Personal information
- Full name: Senad Lekaj
- Date of birth: 29 August 1989 (age 37)
- Place of birth: Shkodër, Albania
- Position: Midfielder

Team information
- Current team: Vëllaznimi

Youth career
- –2009: Vllaznia

Senior career*
Years	Team	Apps	(Gls)
2010–2011	Vllaznia	0	(0)
2010–2011	→ Ada (loan)	17	(1)
2011	→ Trepça (loan)	3	(0)
2012–2013	Burreli	42	(3)
2013–2014	Veleçiku	4	(0)
2014–2015	Tërbuni	27	(7)
2015–2016	Kastrioti	8	(0)
2016–2017	Besëlidhja	19	(2)
2017–2018	Tërbuni	2	(0)
2019	Burreli	8	(0)
2020–2021	Vëllaznimi		
2021–2024	Murlani		
- * Club domestic league appearances and goals

Senad Lekaj (born 29 August 1989 in Shkodër) is an Albanian former professional footballer who last played for KF Murlani.
