= 2015–16 Kategoria Superiore =

Kategoria Superiore
- Season: 2015–16
- Dates: 21 August 2015 – 18 May 2016
- Champions: Skënderbeu; 7th Albanian title
- Relegated: Bylis; Tërbuni
- Champions League: Skënderbeu (Note: Partizani were transferred to the 2016–17 UEFA Champions League second qualifying round following the exclusion of Skënderbeu Korçë by UEFA for match-fixing.); Partizani
- Europa League: Partizani; Kukësi; Teuta
- Matches: 180
- Goals: 395 (2.19 per match)
- Top goalscorer: Hamdi Salihi (27 goals)
- Best goalkeeper: Alban Hoxha (19 clean sheets)
- Biggest home win: Flamurtari 7–0 Tërbuni (4 October 2015); Skënderbeu 6–1 Laçi (4 May 2016)
- Biggest away win: Tërbuni 0–4 Vllaznia (9 March 2016)
- Highest scoring: Flamurtari 7–0 Tërbuni (4 October 2015)
- Longest winning run: 9 games Partizani
- Longest unbeaten run: 16 games Partizani
- Longest winless run: 14 games Tërbuni
- Longest losing run: 5 games Tërbuni; Flamurtari
- All statistics correct as of 24 November 2016.

The 2015–16 Kategoria Superiore was the 77th season of the top Albanian professional league for association football clubs, since its establishment in 1930. It was organised by the Albanian Football Association and it was the 13th season under the name Kategoria Superiore, which took over from the Albanian National Championship in 2003. The season began on 21 August 2015 and concluded on 18 May 2016.

Skënderbeu began the season as defending champions of the 2014–15 season. Bylis and Tërbuni entered as the two promoted teams from the 2014–15 Albanian First Division, but they were both relegated at the end of the season.

Hamdi Salihi of Skënderbeu won the scoring title with 27 goals in 30 games. Alban Hoxha of Partizani led the league with 19 clean sheets in 32 games. Gugash Magani of Flamurtari and then Teuta won the Manager of the Season award.

Bylis, the 2014–15 Kategoria e Parë champion, returns to the top level after just one year of absence.

== Teams ==
=== Stadia and last season ===
Locations of the 2015–16 Kategoria Superiore teams

Team	Home city	Stadium	Capacity	2014–15 season
Bylis	Ballsh	Adush Muça Stadium	5,200	Kategoria e Parë
Flamurtari	Vlorë	Flamurtari Stadium	8,200	6th
Kukësi	Kukës	Zeqir Ymeri Stadium	5,000	2nd
Laçi	Laç	Laçi Stadium	2,300	5th
Partizani	Tirana	Qemal Stafa Stadium	12,800	3rd
Skënderbeu	Korçë	Skënderbeu Stadium	5,724	Champions
Teuta	Durrës	Niko Dovana Stadium	12,040	8th
Tirana	Tirana	Selman Stërmasi Stadium	9,600	4th
Tërbuni	Pukë	Ismail Xhemali Stadium	1,950	Kategoria e Parë
Vllaznia	Shkodër	Reshit Rusi Stadium^{(2)}	1,200	7th

- (2) Vllaznia played the majority of their 2015–16 home games at the Reshit Rusi Stadium in Shkodër. The club's normal home ground, the Loro Boriçi Stadium was undergoing reconstruction.

== Stadiums ==
Bylis	Flamurtari	Kukësi	Laçi	Partizani
Adush Muça Stadium	Flamurtari Stadium	Zeqir Ymeri Stadium	Laçi Stadium	Qemal Stafa Stadium
Capacity: 5,200	Capacity: 8,200	Capacity: 5,000	Capacity: 2,300	Capacity: 19,700
Skënderbeu	Teuta	Tirana	Tërbuni	Vllaznia
Skënderbeu Stadium	Niko Dovana Stadium	Selman Stërmasi Stadium	Ismail Xhemali Stadium	Reshit Rusi Stadium
Capacity: 5,724	Capacity: 12,040	Capacity: 9,600	Capacity: 1,950	Capacity: 1,200

== Personnel and kits ==
Note: Flags indicate national team as has been defined under FIFA eligibility rules. Players and Managers may hold more than one non-FIFA nationality.

Team	President	Manager	Captain	Kit manufacturer	Shirt sponsor
Bylis	(Albania) Agron Kapllanaj	(Bosnia and Herzegovina) Adnan Zildžović	(Albania) Maringlen Shoshi	Nike	—
Flamurtari	(Albania) Sinan Idrizi	(Albania) Zekirija Ramadani	(Albania) Bruno Telushi	Nike	TRK/Atlasjet
Kukësi	(Albania) Safet Gjici	(Albania) Klodian Duro	(Albania) Rrahman Hallaçi	Nike	Kevin Construction
Laçi	(Albania) Pashk Laska	(Albania) Ramadan Ndreu	(Croatia) Stipe Buljan	Nike	Top Sport
Partizani	(Albania) Gazment Demi	(Italy) Andrea Agostinelli	(Albania) Alban Hoxha	Nike	—
Skënderbeu	(Albania) Ardian Takaj	(Albania) Mirel Josa	(Albania) Bledi Shkëmbi	Nike	Ama Cafè
Teuta	(Albania) Edmond Hasanbelliu	(Albania) Gugash Magani	(Albania) Bledjan Rizvani	Nike	Caffè Pascucci
Tirana	(Albania) Refik Halili	(Albania) Ilir Daja	(Albania) Ervin Bulku	Nike	–
Tërbuni	(Albania) Grand Frroku	(Albania) Viktor Gjoni	(Albania) Abaz Karakaçi	Nike	AML Leonard
Vllaznia	(Albania) Bashkia Shkodër	(Albania) Armando Cungu	(Albania) Ndriçim Shtubina	Nike	–

== Managerial changes ==
Team	Outgoing manager	Manner of departure	Date of vacancy	Position in table	Incoming manager	Date of appointment
Partizani	(Albania) Shpëtim Duro	End of contract	29 May 2015	Pre-season	(Albania) Sulejman Starova	30 May 2015
Tirana	(Nigeria) Ndubuisi Egbo	End of tenure as a caretaker	30 May 2015	Pre-season	(Albania) Shkëlqim Muça	30 May 2015
Teuta	(Albania) Gentian Begeja	End of contract	31 May 2015	Pre-season	(Albania) Gugash Magani	1 June 2015
Bylis	(Albania) Roland Nenaj	End of contract	31 May 2015	Pre-season	(Albania) Agim Canaj	28 July 2015
Flamurtari	(Italy) Ernestino Ramella	Mutual consent	31 May 2015	Pre-season	(Czech Republic) Stanislav Levý	6 July 2015
Kukësi	(Serbia) Miodrag Radanović	Mutual consent	14 June 2015	Pre-season	(Brazil) Marcello Troisi	15 June 2015
Tërbuni	(Albania) Elvis Plori	End of contract	14 June 2015	Pre-season	(Albania) Samuel Nikaj	11 July 2015

== League table ==
Pos	Team	Pld	W	D	L	GF	GA	GD	Pts	Qualification or relegation
1	Skënderbeu (Note: Skënderbeu would have qualified for the Champions League second qualifying round, but were excluded from participating in the 2016–17 European competitions by UEFA for match-fixing.) (C)	36	25	4	7	73	27	+46	79	
2	Partizani	36	21	11	4	51	21	+30	74	Qualification for the Champions League second qualifying round
3	Kukësi	36	18	9	9	41	25	+16	63 (Note: Kukësi ahead of Teuta on head-to-head record; Kukësi–Teuta 3–0, Teuta–Kukësi 1–0, Kukësi–Teuta 2–2, Teuta–Kukësi 0–0.)	Qualification for the Europa League first qualifying round (Note: Kukësi qualified for the Europa League first qualifying round by winning the 2015–16 Albanian Cup.)
4	Teuta	36	18	9	9	43	28	+15	63	Qualification for the Europa League first qualifying round
5	Tirana	36	13	14	9	37	25	+12	53	
6	Vllaznia	36	11	6	19	36	42	−6	39	
7	Laçi	36	8	12	16	30	48	−18	36	
8	Flamurtari (Note: Flamurtari were deducted three points.)	36	9	11	16	34	44	−10	35	
9	Bylis (R)	36	8	8	20	27	53	−26	32	Relegation to the 2016–17 Kategoria e Parë
10	Tërbuni (R)	36	4	6	26	22	81	−59	18	Relegation to the 2016–17 Kategoria e Parë

Source: Albanian Football Association (in Albanian), Soccerway
Rules for classification: 1) Points; 2) Head-to-head points; 3) Head-to-head goal difference; 4) Head-to-head goals scored; 5) Goal difference; 6) Goals scored; 7) Draw.
(C) Champions; (R) Relegated

== Results ==
Each team plays every opponent four times, twice at home and twice away, for a total of 36 games.

=== First half of season ===
Home \ Away	BYL	FLA	KUK	LAÇ	PAR	SKË	TËR	TEU	TIR	VLL
Bylis		2–3	1–1	1–0	1–2	1–4	0–2	2–1	0–1	3–1
Flamurtari	0–0		0–1	0–0	0–0	3–1	7–0	0–1	0–2	2–0
Kukësi	2–0	1–0		1–0	0–1	2–1	1–0	3–0	0–1	1–0
Laçi	3–1	2–1	1–1		2–3	0–3	4–0	2–2	1–1	2–0
Partizani	1–1	2–1	2–0	1–1		2–1	4–0	0–1	1–0	1–0
Skënderbeu	4–0	2–0	1–0	4–0	1–0		4–0	2–2	2–1	3–1
Tërbuni	4–2	1–0	1–1	1–1	1–2	0–2		0–1	1–2	0–3
Teuta	3–0	3–1	1–0	0–1	0–1	0–1	3–1		0–0	2–0
Tirana	0–0	1–1	2–1	0–0	0–0	1–2	3–0	2–0		0–0
Vllaznia	3–2	4–0	1–1	0–1	1–2	0–1	2–0	0–1	1–1	

Source: Albanian Football Association
Legend: Blue = home team win; Yellow = draw; Red = away team win.

=== Second half of season ===
Home \ Away	BYL	FLA	KUK	LAÇ	PAR	SKË	TËR	TEU	TIR	VLL
Bylis		0–0	0–2	1–0	0–2	1–1	4–0	0–1	0–0	0–1
Flamurtari	0–0		0–1	0–1	1–1	0–2	1–1	1–0	2–1	2–0
Kukësi	3–0	4–0		1–0	0–1	1–0	1–0	2–2	2–1	0–0
Laçi	0–1	1–2	1–1		0–0	0–2	0–0	1–2	0–3	3–2
Partizani	1–2	1–1	1–0	2–0		1–1	4–0	1–2	2–0	3–0
Skënderbeu	3–0	5–1	3–1	6–1	0–1		2–3	1–0	1–0	2–1
Tërbuni	0–1	0–2	1–2	1–1	0–0	1–3		1–4	1–3	0–4
Teuta	1–0	1–1	0–0	3–0	0–2	1–1	2–1		0–0	1–0
Tirana	2–0	0–0	1–1	1–0	2–2	0–1	3–0	0–0		1–0
Vllaznia	1–0	2–1	1–2	0–0	1–1	1–0	2–0	0–2	3–1	

Source: Albanian Football Association
Legend: Blue = home team win; Yellow = draw; Red = away team win.

== Season statistics ==
=== Scoring ===
==== Top scorers ====
As of matches played on 21 May 2016.

Rank	Player	Club	Goals
1	(Albania) Hamdi Salihi	Skënderbeu	27
2	(Albania) Xhevahir Sukaj	Partizani	21
3	(Nigeria) James Adeniyi	Laçi/Skënderbeu	15
4	(Albania) Elis Bakaj	Tirana	14
5	(Nigeria) Peter Olayinka	Skënderbeu	10
5	(North Macedonia) Izair Emini	Kukësi	10
7	(Albania) Artur Magani	Teuta	9
7	(Brazil) Mateus Lima	Kukësi	7
7	(Albania) Emiljano Musta	Teuta	7
7	(Albania) Ardit Hoxhaj	Bylis	7
10	(Albania) Eraldo Çinari	Vllaznia	6
10	(Brazil) Erick Flores	Kukësi	6
10	(Albania) Valdan Nimani	Laçi	6
10	(Serbia) Stevan Račić	Partizani	6
10	(Albania) Ndriçim Shtubina	Vllaznia	6
10	(Albania) Bruno Telushi	Flamurtari	6

==== Hat-tricks ====
Player	For	Against	Result	Date	Ref
(Albania) Hamdi Salihi	Skënderbeu	Flamurtari	5–2	20 March 2016	
(Albania) Elis Bakaj	Tirana	Tërbuni	3–0	3 April 2016	
(Albania) Xhevahir Sukaj	Partizani	Tërbuni	4–0	30 April 2016	

==== Clean sheets ====
As of matches played on 21 May 2016.

Rank	Player	Club	Clean sheets
1	(Albania) Alban Hoxha	Partizani Tirana	19
2	(Albania) Edvan Bakaj	Tirana	17
3	(Albania) Orges Shehi	Skënderbeu Korçë	16
4	(Albania) Shpëtim Moçka	Teuta Durrës	15
5	(Albania) Ervis Koçi	Kukësi	10
5	(Montenegro) Andrija Dragojević	Vllaznia Shkodër	10
7	(Albania) Stivi Frashëri	Tirana/Bylis Ballsh	9
8	(Albania) Argjent Halili	Flamurtari Vlorë	8
9	(Albania) Enea Koliqi	Kukësi	7

=== Discipline ===
As of 21 May 2016

==== Player ====
- Most yellow cards: 12
  - Orgest Gava (Bylis)
  - Kristi Vangjeli (Skënderbeu)
- Most red cards: 3
  - Bruno Telushi (Flamurtari)

==== Club ====
- Most yellow cards: 97
  - Bylis
- Most red cards: 6
  - Flamurtari

== Attendances ==
Club	Lowest attendance	Highest attendance	Average attendance
Partizani	1,000	10,031	3,009
KF Tirana	2,000	11,734	2,993
Skënderbeu	500	4,200	2,731
FK Kukësi	531	5,110	1,957
Flamurtari	70	3,000	1,215
Teuta	150	1,700	940
Vllaznia	2,500	8,000	5,550
KF Laçi	300	1,800	828
Bylis	300	1,800	828
Tërbuni	300	1,800	828
