= Vilson Lila =

Albanian footballer

Personal information
- Full name: Vilson Lila
- Date of birth: 6 October 1989 (age 37)
- Place of birth: Bulqizë, Albania
- Position: Centre back

Team information
- Current team: Korabi
- Number: 13

Youth career
- –2008: Kastrioti

Senior career*
Years	Team	Apps	(Gls)
2008–2009	Kastrioti	30	(0)
2010	Skrapari	14	(0)
2010–2011	Adriatiku	21	(0)
2011–2013	Kukësi	32	(0)
2013–2016	Tërbuni	67	(0)
2016–2018	Kastrioti	54	(0)
2019	Gjilani	15	(0)
2019–2020	Liria Prizren	0	(0)
2020–2021	KF A&N	0	(0)
2021–2022	Tërbuni	29	(1)
2022–	Korabi	50	(3)
- * Club domestic league appearances and goals as of 1 June 2024

Vilson Lila (born 6 October 1989) is an Albanian professional footballer who plays as a centre-back for Korabi.

== Club career ==
On 7 January 2019, Lila joined Kosovar club Gjilani. Ahead of the following 2019–20 season, he moved to Liria Prizren.
