= Borko Milenković =

Serbian footballer

Personal information
- Full name: Borko Milenković
- Date of birth: 10 July 1984 (age 42)
- Place of birth: Paraćin, SFR Yugoslavia
- Height: 1.76 m (5 ft 9 in)
- Positions: Left-back; centre-back

Youth career
- Jagodina

Senior career*
Years	Team	Apps	(Gls)
2002–2006	Jedinstvo Paraćin		
2006–2009	Jagodina	34	(0)
2009–2010	→ Mornar (loan)	8	(0)
2010–2011	→ Novi Pazar (loan)	17	(0)
2010	Novi Pazar	16	(0)
2011–2013	Laçi	65	(0)
2013–2014	Timok	20	(0)
2014–2015	Sloga Kraljevo	20	(0)
2015–2016	Tërbuni	13	(0)
2017–2018	Temnić	14	(0)
- * Club domestic league appearances and goals as of 7 October 2015

Borko Milenković (Serbian Cyrillic: Борко Миленковић; born 10 July 1984) is a Serbian retired footballer who played in the Albanian Superliga.

== Career ==
Milenković previously played for FK Jagodina in the Serbian SuperLiga after having played for his hometown club FK Jedinstvo Paraćin. He has also played for Mornar of Montenegro, Novi Pazar, Timok and Sloga Kraljevo of Serbia and most recently Laçi and Tërbuni of Albania.

== Honours ==
Laçi

- Albanian Cup (1): 2012–13
