= Ervin Rexha =

Albanian footballer

Personal information
- Full name: Ervin Rexha
- Date of birth: 1 November 1991 (age 34)
- Place of birth: Shkodër, Albania
- Height: 1.83 m (6 ft 0 in)
- Position: Defender

Team information
- Current team: Amacspor

Youth career
- 2008–2010: Vllaznia Shkodër

Senior career*
Years	Team	Apps	(Gls)
2008–2010	Vllaznia	0	(0)
2010–2012	Laçi	31	(0)
2012–2013	Tomori	22	(0)
2013–2014	Vllaznia	2	(0)
2014–2015	Luftëtari	22	(2)
2015	Tërbuni	10	(0)
2016–2017	Besëlidhja	19	(0)
2017–2018	FC Sandzak Hattingen	21	(6)
2019–	Amacspor Dahlhausen		
- * Club domestic league appearances and goals as of 10 October 2019

Ervin Rexha (born 1 November 1991 in Shkodër) is an Albanian professional footballer who currently plays for Amacspor Dahlhausen in the German amateur leagues. He last played professionally for Tërbuni and Besëlidhja in Albania.
