= Mouss Bangoura =

Guinean professional footballer

Personal information
- Full name: Mouss Bangoura
- Date of birth: 27 January 1992 (age 34)
- Place of birth: Conakry, Guinea
- Position: Striker

Senior career*
Years	Team	Apps	(Gls)
2016–2017	Pogradeci	19	(3)
2017–2018	Besëlidhja Lezhë	10	(3)
- * Club domestic league appearances and goals

Mouss Bangoura (born 27 January 1992) is a Guinean professional footballer who last played as a striker for Albanian club Besëlidhja Lezhë.
