= Roland Peqini =

Albanian footballer

Personal information
- Full name: Roland Peqini
- Date of birth: 25 December 1990 (age 35)
- Place of birth: Elbasan, Albania
- Height: 1.78 m (5 ft 10 in)
- Position: Defender

Youth career
- 2002–2007: Dinamo Tirana

Senior career*
Years	Team	Apps	(Gls)
2007–2012	Dinamo Tirana	49	(0)
2009–2010	→ Apolonia Fier (loan)	10	(0)
2012–2013	Kukësi	24	(0)
2013–2014	Tirana	2	(0)
2014–2015	Kukësi	7	(0)
2015–2016	Tërbuni Pukë	16	(0)
2016	Dinamo Tirana	13	(0)
2016–2017	Elbasani	12	(0)
2017–2018	Dinamo Tirana	23	(0)
Total		156	(0)

International career^{‡}
2010–2011	Albania U21	9	(0)
- * Club domestic league appearances and goals as of 21 April 2018 ‡ National team caps and goals as of 19 February 2016

Roland Peqini (born 25 December 1990) is a former Albanian professional footballer who played as a defender.

== Club career ==
=== Tërbuni Pukë ===
In July 2015, Peqini completed a transfer to newly promoted top flight side Tërbuni Pukë for an undisclosed fee. He made his debut on 23 August by starting in team's first ever Albanian Superliga match against Tirana which finished in a 1–2 home defeat, despite taking the lead. Peqini made 16 league appearances, in addition 2 in cup, before leaving in the first days in January.

=== Return to Kukësi ===
On 4 January 2016, Peqini agreed terms with his former club Kukësi where he signed a contract until the end of the season, returning to the team for a third time. However, his third spell with the club was short-lived, as he was suddenly released after only 14 days. Speaking on that, he accused the team's coach Klodian Duro as the main reason of his departure, by saying: "it was him [Duro] who brought me to Kukësi and was him who removed me from the team."

=== Return to Dinamo Tirana ===
On 23 January 2016, Peqini joined Albanian First Division strugglers Dinamo Tirana on an 18-month contract, returning to the capital club after four years absence. He was assigned squad number 15 and made his return debut on 13 February in a 1–0 away defeat to Butrinti Sarandë, playing full-90 minutes.

=== Elbasani ===
On 11 September 2016, Peqini joined the fellow Albanian First Division side Elbasani on a free transfer, signing a one-year contract. He left the club on 29 January of the following year after 12 league appearances due to club financial problems.

=== Third spell at Dinamo Tirana ===
On 1 February 2017, after leaving Elbasani, Peqini returned to Dinamo on a free transfer by signing until the end of the season. After two matches as an unused substitute, Peqini appeared on the matchday 16 against Pogradeci, entering as a substitute in the 25th minute to fill the blank left by the dismissal of Julian Brahja, with the finishing in a 0–1 home defeat. He concluded the second part of 2016–17 season with 8 league appearances as Dinamo once again escape relegation. He agreed a contract extension for another season in August 2017, and was also named club captain.

=== Retirement ===
On 3 July 2018, Peqini announced his retirement from the sport at the age of 27, citing his injuries as the main reason.

== International career ==
Peqini has been a former Albania U21 member, ammasing 9 appearances from 2010 to 2012. He made his first appearance on 26 May 2010 in a friendly versus Poland which ended in a 2–2 draw.

== Career statistics ==
As of 21 April 2018

Club	Season	League			Cup		Continental		Other		Total	
Club	Season	Division	Apps	Goals	Apps	Goals	Apps	Goals	Apps	Goals	Apps	Goals
Dinamo Tirana	2007–08	Albanian Superliga	1	0	0	0	—		—		1	0
Dinamo Tirana	2008–09	Albanian Superliga	2	0	0	0	0	0	1 (Note: Appearance in Albanian Supercup)	0	3	0
Dinamo Tirana	Total		3	0	0	0	0	0	1	0	4	0
Apoloinia Fier	2008–09	Albanian Superliga	10	0	0	0	—		—		10	0
Apoloinia Fier	Total		10	0	0	0	—		—		10	0
Dinamo Tirana	2009–10	Albanian Superliga	14	0	3	0	0	0	—		17	0
Dinamo Tirana	2010–11	Albanian Superliga	13	0	5	0	1 (Note: All appearance(s) in UEFA Champions League)	0	1	0	20	0
Dinamo Tirana	2011–12	Albanian Superliga	19	0	3	0	—		—		22	0
Dinamo Tirana	Total		46	0	11	0	1	0	1	0	59	0
Kukësi	2012–13	Albanian Superliga	24	0	10	1	—		—		34	1
Kukësi	2013–14	Albanian Superliga	—		—		7 (Note: All appearance(s) in UEFA Europa League)	0	—		7	0
Kukësi	Total		24	0	10	1	7	0	—		41	1
Tirana	2013–14	Albanian Superliga	2	0	0	0	—		—		2	0
Tirana	Total		2	0	0	0	—		—		2	0
Kukësi	2014–15	Albanian Superliga	7	0	4	0	—		—		11	0
Kukësi	Total		7	0	4	0	—		—		11	0
Tërbuni Pukë	2015–16	Albanian Superliga	16	0	2	0	—		—		18	0
Tërbuni Pukë	Total		16	0	2	0	—		—		18	0
Dinamo Tirana	2015–16	Albanian First Division	13	0	—		—		—		13	0
Dinamo Tirana	Total		13	0	—		—		—		13	0
Elbasani	2016–17	Albanian First Division	12	0	2	0	—		—		14	0
Elbasani	Total		12	0	2	0	—		—		14	0
Dinamo Tirana	2016–17	Albanian First Division	8	0	—		—		—		8	0
Dinamo Tirana	2017–18	Albanian First Division	15	0	0	0	—		—		15	0
Dinamo Tirana	Total		23	0	0	0	—		—		23	0
Career total			156	0	29	1	8	0	2	0	195	1

== Honours ==
=== Club ===
Dinamo Tirana

- Albanian Superliga: 2009–10
