= Abaz Karakaçi =

Albanian footballer

Personal information
- Date of birth: 25 August 1992 (age 34)
- Place of birth: Shkodër, Albania
- Height: 1.77 m (5 ft 10 in)
- Position: Midfielder

Team information
- Current team: AF Elbasani
- Number: 16

Youth career
- –2011: Vllaznia

Senior career*
Years	Team	Apps	(Gls)
2011–2013	Vllaznia	11	(1)
2012	→ Partizani (loan)	13	(0)
2013	→ Ada (loan)	12	(1)
2013	Butrinti	13	(0)
2014	Luftëtari	13	(3)
2014	Apolonia	10	(1)
2015–2016	Tërbuni	29	(3)
2016	Kastrioti	10	(1)
2017	Besëlidhja	11	(1)
2017–2018	Kastrioti	15	(0)
2018–2019	Egnatia	21	(3)
2019–2023	Kastrioti	86	(3)
2023–	AF Elbasani	28	(7)
- * Club domestic league appearances and goals as of 1 June 2024

Abaz Karakaçi (born 25 August 1992) is an Albanian professional footballer who plays as a midfielder for AF Elbasani in the Kategoria e parë. He was born in Shkodër, Albania.

== Career ==
On 17 January 2014, Karakaçi completed a transfer to Albanian First Division side Luftëtari Gjirokastër for the second part of 2013–14 season.

On 14 June 2014, Karakaçi was signed by Albanian Superliga side Apolonia Fier on a one-year contract, becoming the club's second signing in summer transfer window.

On 15 September 2017, Karakaçi rejoined Kastrioti Krujë as a free agent. He was released later on 20 April 2018 along with his teammate Alis Boci, terminating his second spell with 15 league appearances.
