= Valdan Nimani =

Albanian footballer

Personal information
- Full name: Valdan Nimani
- Date of birth: 5 March 1987 (age 39)
- Place of birth: Shkodër, Albania
- Position: Forward

Team information
- Current team: Veleçiku Koplik
- Number: 14

Youth career
- –2007: Vllaznia Shkodër

Senior career*
Years	Team	Apps	(Gls)
2008–2010	Laçi	46	(8)
2010–2011	Vllaznia	26	(0)
2012–2016	Laçi	104	(15)
2016–2017	Kamza	14	(1)
2017–2019	Tërbuni Pukë	22	(2)
2019	Veleçiku Koplik	0	(0)
- * Club domestic league appearances and goals as of 21:30, 2 May 2019 (UTC)

Valdan Nimani (born 5 March 1987) is an Albanian football player who plays as a forward.

== Club career ==
=== Early career ===
Nimani started his professional career with Laçi in the 2008–09 season, where he aided the club to return in Albanian Superliga with 5 goals in 17 appearances. Nimani made his Albanian Superliga debut in the opening match against Skënderbeu Korçë on 23 August 2009, where he scored the first goal of the match in a 4–3 losing effort.

=== Vllaznia Shkodër ===
On 25 July 2010, Nimani agreed personal terms and signed a contract with his boyhood club Vllaznia Shkodër. He made his Vllaznia Shkodër on 22 August in the opening league match of 2010–11 season against Bylis Ballsh at home, he played full-90 minutes in a 3–2 win.

In the last days of 2011, Nimani was released from the club along with two other players.

=== Laçi ===
On 9 January 2012, Nimani officially returned to Laçi after one-and-a-half season with Vllaznia Shkodër, taking the squad number 19 for the second part of 2011–12 season.

==== 2012–13 season ====
Nimani started his fifth season with the club on 25 August 2012 in the 1–1 home draw against Besa Kavajë, where he played in the entire match. He scored his first goal of the season on 26 September in the first leg of 2012–13 Albanian Cup first round against Adriatiku Mamurras, netting the third and final goal of the 3–0 away win.

==== 2013–14 season ====
Nimani played his first match of the season on 1 September 2013 against Tirana at Qemal Stafa Stadium in team's first league match of the season, playing in the entire match that finished in a goalless draw.

On 15 March 2014, during the match against Bylis Ballsh which ended in a goalless draw but was awarded to Laçi with a 3–0 win, Nimani suffered a flaw rib which kept him out for two weeks.

==== 2014–15 season ====
Nimani started the new season on 3 July 2014 in the first leg of the 2014–15 UEFA Europa League first qualifying round against the Slovenian side Rudar Velenje, where he played full-90 minutes in a 1–1 away draw. The returning leg ended in the same results, but Laçi managed to qualify thanks to penalty shootouts; Nimani played for 82 minutes. In the next qualifying round, Laçi faced Zorya Luhansk who defeated Nimani's side 3–0 in the first leg at Laçi Stadium. In the second leg, Laçi was defeated again but this time 2–1, with Nimani scoring his side only goal, becoming the club's all-time top goalscorer in European competitions.

Nimani started the domestic season by playing full-90 minutes in team's opening Albanian Superliga match against Partizani Tirana, which finished in a 1–1 draw.

==== 2015–16 season ====
As 2014–15 Albanian Cup winners, Laçi gained the right to enter the 2015–16 UEFA Europa League first qualifying round where Nimani's side was going to face Inter Baku. In the first leg at home on 2 July, Nimani played only 34 minutes as a substitute with Laçi who didn't earn more than a 1–1 draw. In the second match, Nimani played as a starter for 82 minutes, failing to find the net with the match finishing in a goalless draw, which resulted fatal for the team who was eliminated thanks to away goal rule.

On 27 February of the following year, in the final moments of the goalless draw away against Vllaznia Shkodër, Nimani was involved in an incident with Vllaznia Shkodër's Erdenis Gurishta, hitting him in the head with his right boot, leaving the defender in the ground unconscious. Gurishta was immediately transported in the nearest hospital in Shkodër, and after hours of fear and anxiety, Gurishta's condition was finally stabilized.

== Career statistics ==
As of 15 April 2016

Club	Season	League			Cup		Continental (Note: Including continental competitions, such as UEFA Champions League and UEFA Europa League)		Other (Note: Including other competitions, such as Albanian Supercup)		Total	
Club	Season	Division	Apps	Goals	Apps	Goals	Apps	Goals	Apps	Goals	Apps	Goals
Laçi	2008–09	Albanian First Division	17	5	1	1	—		—		18	6
Laçi	2009–10	Albanian Superliga	29	3	1	0	—		—		30	3
Laçi	2010–11	Albanian Superliga	—		—		2	1	—		2	1
Laçi	Total		46	8	2	1	2	1	—		50	10
Vllaznia Shkodër	2010–11	Albanian Superliga	20	0	2	0	—		—		22	0
Vllaznia Shkodër	2011–12	Albanian Superliga	6	0	4	0	2	0	—		12	0
Vllaznia Shkodër	Total		26	0	6	0	2	0	—		34	0
Laçi	2011–12	Albanian Superliga	6	1	6	0	—		—		12	1
Laçi	2012–13	Albanian Superliga	21	5	13	5	—		—		34	10
Laçi	2013–14	Albanian Superliga	24	3	2	1	2	1	1	0	29	5
Laçi	2014–15	Albanian Superliga	31	2	5	1	4	1	—		40	4
Laçi	2015–16	Albanian Superliga	22	4	6	2	2	0	1	0	31	6
Laçi	Total		104	15	32	9	8	2	2	0	143	26
Career total			176	23	40	10	12	3	2	0	227	36

== Honours ==
Laçi

- Albanian Cup (2): 2012–13, 2014–15
- Albanian Supercup (1): 2015
