= Pjerin Fushaj =

Albanian businessman and sports executive

Pjerin Fushaj (born in Shkodër) is an Albanian businessman and sports executive who serves as the president of the football club KF Besëlidhja Lezhë.
