= Xhovalin Delia =

Albanian Italian artist and filmmaker (born 1959)

- Born: 29 April 1959 (age 67); Pukë, Albania
- Occupations: Painter, film maker, writer

Xhovalin Delia (born 29 April 1959) is an Albanian Italian artist, painter, film director and writer from Pukë, Albania who lives in Florence, Italy.

== Career ==
Xhovalin Delia (born 29 April 1959) is an Albanian–Italian painter, film director, and writer. He lives and works in Florence

== Biography ==
After studying at the Academy of Fine Arts in Tirana, Delia began his career as a set designer and animator at the Albanian Central Film Studio, producing several animated films.

One of them, Chi lo merita, received the third national prize in Albania and a special award at the Annecy International Animated Film Festival in France.

Alongside his work in cinema, Delia exhibited paintings. At the National Gallery of Arts in Tirana he presented Primavera, considered the first artwork depicting a female nude ever shown in Albania during the communist regime.

In 1992 he moved to Italy, settling in Florence, where he continued his artistic, cinematic, literary, and journalistic activities. In Florence, his artistic language developed into a distinctive style, referred to as "Delia’s style".

== Awards and recognition ==
- 1990 – Third national prize at the Festival of Animated Film (Tirana).
- 1992 – Special award at the Annecy International Animated Film Festival (France).
- 2013 – First prize “Lorenzo il Magnifico” at the IX Florence Biennale of Contemporary Art, with the multimedia work Big Bang.
- 2015 – Special award at the Florence Biennale of Contemporary Art.
- 2016 – Special award in Monte Carlo.
- 2018 – First prize at the International Art Competition in Palermo.
- 2025 - Second PRIZE "Lorenzo il Magnifico" at the XV Florence Biennale of contemporary Art with "My Florence" mixmedia
- 2026 - Invited to be exhibited at the Louvre, Paris.

== Exhibitions ==
Delia has participated in exhibitions and art events in Italy and abroad, including the Florence Biennale, the Milan Biennale, the Rome Triennale, Monte Carlo, and the Louvre in Paris.

He is also listed among the participating artists at the XV Florence Biennale scheduled for October 2025.

His studio-gallery, located in the historic center of Florence, also hosts solo and collective exhibitions of contemporary art.

== Main works ==
=== Animated films ===
- Chi lo merita (awarded in Tirana and Annecy).
- Other animated short films.

=== Short films ===
- Il passaporto.
- Other minor works.

=== Contemporary art ===
- Primavera (oil on canvas, 1990).
- La mia Firenze (three-dimensional work, "Delia’s style").
- Other paintings and installations.

=== Postmodern art ===
- Big Bang (multimedia work, awarded at the Florence Biennale 2013).
- Other multimedia and video art works.

=== Literary works ===
- Venere, novel, Dituria, 2005.
- God Bless America, novel, Dituria, 2009.
- Numerous articles and essays on art, culture, and politics.

== See also ==
- Modern Albanian art
