= Arbër Mone =

Albanian footballer

Personal information
- Full name: Arbër Mone
- Date of birth: 8 June 1988 (age 38)
- Place of birth: Fier, Albania
- Position: Defender

Senior career*
Years	Team	Apps	(Gls)
2008–2009	Naftëtari	10	(0)
2009–2010	Apolonia	9	(1)
2011	Himara	13	(1)
2011–2015	Tërbuni	88	(2)
2016	Kukësi		
2016	Bylis	9	(0)
2017–2018	Lushnja	37	(2)
2018-2019	Ferizaj	33	(0)
2019–2022	Lushnja	31	(3)
2022–2023	Elbasani		
- * Club domestic league appearances and goals as of 20 October 2019

Arbër Mone (born 8 June 1988) is an Albanian professional footballer who plays as a defender.
