= Sokol Neziri =

Albanian footballer

Personal information
- Date of birth: 30 June 1996 (age 30)
- Place of birth: Krujë, Albania
- Height: 1.78 m (5 ft 10 in)
- Position: Defender

Team information
- Current team: Kastrioti
- Number: 4

Youth career
- –2014: Kastrioti

Senior career*
Years	Team	Apps	(Gls)
2014–2022	Kastrioti	138	(1)
2022–2023	Flamurtari	7	(0)
2023	→ Turbina (loan)	10	(0)
2023–2024	Kastrioti	29	(2)
2024–	Liria Prizren	0	(0)
- * Club domestic league appearances and goals as of 8 August 2024

Sokol Neziri (born 30 June 1996) is an Albanian footballer who plays as a defender for Liria Prizren.

== Career ==
=== Kastrioti ===
A graduate of the club's youth academy, Neziri made his Albanian Superliga debut on 10 May 2014, playing the entirety of a 3–1 defeat to Flamurtari.

=== Liria Prizren ===
On 6 August 2024, he signed for Liria Prizren.
