= Ivan Fuštar =

Croatian footballer (born 1989)

Personal information
- Date of birth: 18 August 1989 (age 37)
- Place of birth: Split, SR Croatia, SFR Yugoslavia
- Height: 1.89 m (6 ft 2 1/2 in)
- Position: Centre-back

Team information
- Current team: Tunari
- Number: 55

Youth career
- 2000–2004: Hajduk Split
- 2004–2008: Solin

Senior career*
Years	Team	Apps	(Gls)
2007–2009	Solin	51	(10)
2009–2011	Šibenik	57	(3)
2012	Zadar	11	(1)
2012	Dugopolje	13	(0)
2013	Šibenik	12	(1)
2013–2015	Slaven Belupo	33	(3)
2015–2016	Flamurtari Vlorë	13	(2)
2016	RNK Split	10	(0)
2017–2018	Kamza	12	(0)
2018	Al-Arabi	9	(0)
2018–2020	Nea Salamina	34	(2)
2021–2023	FC Brașov	37	(2)
2023–	Tunari	7	(0)
- * Club domestic league appearances and goals as of 24 October 2023

Ivan Fuštar (born 18 August 1989) is a Croatian professional footballer who plays as a defender for Liga II side Tunari.

== Club career ==
=== Early career ===
Born in Split, Croatia, Fuštar started his football career in the HNK Hajduk Split academy before moving early to NK Solin, where he debuted for the first team in the Druga HNL in the 2006–07 season. Initially a striker, he moved to the Prva HNL team HNK Šibenik in 2009, where he formed an attacking partnership with Ermin Zec. Initially falling out of favor, he was reinvented as a center back by coach Vjekoslav Lokica and established himself again as a regular first-team player.

In early 2012 he left Šibenik for NK Zadar, spending only half a season there before moving to the Druga HNL team NK Dugopolje. He returned for another six months to HNK Šibenik now also in the Druga HNL, but as the team was relegated, he left the club again. In 2013, he joined NK Slaven Belupo in the Prva HNL.

=== Flamurtari Vlorë ===
On 27 July 2015, Fuštar joined Albanian Superliga side Flamurtari Vlorë by penning a one-year contract. He made his competitive debut on the opening matchday of the championship as Flamurtari fell to Teuta Durrës 0–1 at home. His first goal in Albania arrived in his 6th appearance for the club in the 7–0 hammering of Tërbuni Pukë. After 13 appearances and 2 goals, Fuštar left the club in January 2016 without noticing them due to unpaid wages, sending a file to FIFA.

=== RNK Split ===
In the early days of August 2016, Fuštar returned to his homeland by joining RNK Split on a two-year contract. He left the club in December 2016 after 10 league matches due to the club's bankrupt, becoming a free agent once again.

He trialled for Bruneian professional club DPMM FC in early 2017.

=== Kamza ===
On 8 August 2017, Fuštar returned to Albania by signing with newly promoted top flight club Kamza. He made his debut on 9 September by starting in the 1–0 away loss to Kukësi. He asked for his release in the first days of January 2018 after receiving an offer from outside Europe. Fuštar was distinguished for his performances during his spell at Kamzalinjt, making 12 league appearances, all of them as starter, collecting 1022 minutes.

=== Al-Arabi ===
On 9 January 2018, Fuštar completed a transfer to Qatar outfit Al-Arabi by penning a contract lasting until the end of the season with an option to renew for another year. He was given squad number 5, and made his debut three days later by playing the entirely of the 1–1 draw at Al-Sailiya.
