= Endrien Magani =

Albanian footballer

Endri Magani
Personal information
- Full name: Endrien Gugash Magani
- Date of birth: 6 June 1991 (age 35)
- Place of birth: Peqin, Albania
- Position: Midfielder

Team information
- Current team: Lushnja
- Number: 25

Youth career
- Shkumbini Peqin

Senior career*
Years	Team	Apps	(Gls)
2010–2011	Gramshi	26	(0)
2011–2016	Shkumbini	123	(5)
2014	→ Teuta Durrës (loan)	2	(0)
2016–2018	Lushnja	53	(2)
2018–2019	Gjilani	26	(2)
2019–2020	Lushnja	21	(2)
2020–2021	Egnatia	17	(0)
2021	Shkumbini Peqin	15	(1)
2022–	Lushnja	170	(1)
- * Club domestic league appearances and goals as of 1 June 2024

Endrien Gugash Magani (born 6 June 1991 in Peqin) is an Albanian footballer who plays for KS Lushnja in the Albanian First Division.

== Personal life ==
He is a son of former Shkumbini Peqin, Besa Kavajë and Partizani Tirana player Gugash Magani, who has also coached Shkumbini Peqin, Besa Kavajë, Teuta Durrës and Tirana. His brother Artur is also a footballer, and is currently at KF Feronikeli.

Ahead of the 2019/20 season, Magani returned to KS Lushnja for the second time.
