= Taulant Marku =

Albanian footballer

Personal information
- Full name: Taulant Marku
- Date of birth: 14 June 1994 (age 32)
- Place of birth: Pukë, Albania
- Position: Forward

Team information
- Current team: Korabi
- Number: 9

Youth career
- 2011–2014: Shkëndija

Senior career*
Years	Team	Apps	(Gls)
2013–2016	Tërbuni Pukë	43	(8)
2016–2020	Kastrioti Krujë	97	(23)
2020–2022	Korabi	50	(18)
2022–2023	Dinamo Tirana	24	(10)
2023–	Korabi	37	(15)
- * Club domestic league appearances and goals as of 1 June 2024

Taulant Marku (born 14 June 1994 in Pukë) is an Albanian football player who currently plays for Korabi in the Albanian First Division.
