= Ismail Xhemali Stadium =

Stadium in Albania

Coordinates: 42°03′00″N 19°53′53″E

- SIXH
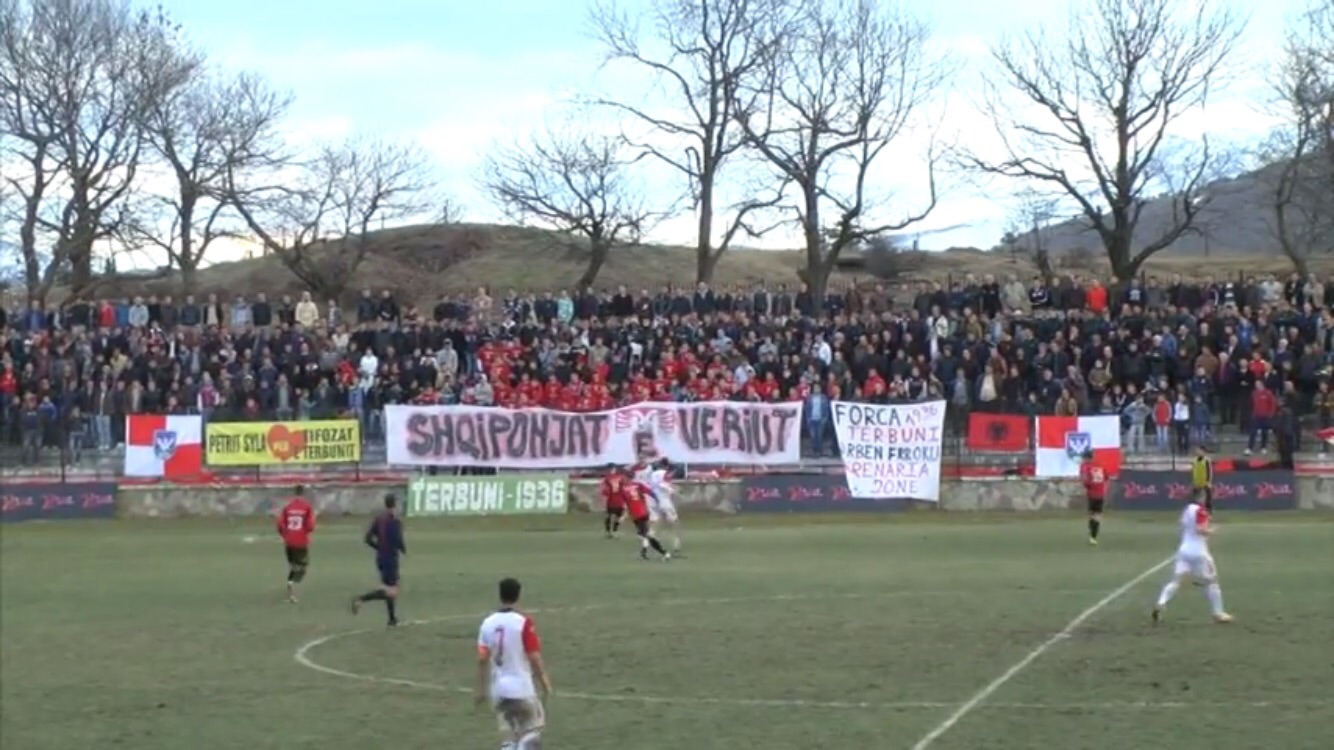
- Interactive map of Ismail Xhemali Stadium
- Location: Pukë, Albania
- Owner: Tërbuni Pukë; Municipality of Pukë
- Capacity: 1,950
- Surface: Natural grass

Construction
- Renovated: 2015
- Expanded: 2015

Tenant
- Tërbuni Pukë

Ismail Xhemali Stadium is a multi-use stadium in Pukë, Albania. The stadium has a seated capacity of 1,950 people and it is mostly used for football matches and it is the home ground of Tërbuni Pukë.

Following Tërbuni Pukë's promotion to the Albanian Superliga for the first time in 2015, the Ismail Xhemali Stadium was inspected by the Albanian Football Association and it was deemed unfit to host top flight football games, and it required reconstruction to meet the minimum requirements of standards set by the Albanian Football Association ahead of the 2015–16 season. Renovations were required on the changing rooms for both players and officials, and seats needed to be installed for the first time in the stadium, rather than benches.
