= Elvis Plori =

Albanian footballer and manager

Personal information
- Full name: Elvis Plori
- Date of birth: 5 August 1978 (age 48)
- Place of birth: Shkodër, PSR Albania
- Position: Midfielder

Senior career*
Years	Team	Apps	(Gls)
1998–1999	Laçi	13	(0)
1999–2001	Vllaznia	28	(2)

Managerial career
- 2010–2011: Vllaznia (assistant)
- 2011: Vllaznia
- 2012: Burreli
- 2012–2013: Burreli
- 2013: Burreli
- 2014–2015: Tërbuni
- 2015–2016: Kastrioti
- 2017: Besëlidhja
- 2018: Kastrioti
- 2018–2019: Burreli
- 2019–2020: Besëlidhja
- 2020–2022: Vllaznia (assistant)
- 2022: Vllaznia
- 2025–: Besëlidhja
- * Club domestic league appearances and goals

Elvis Plori (born 5 August 1978 in Shkodër) is an Albanian football coach and former player.

== Managerial career ==
He was appointed coach of Burreli in January 2012 and reappointed later again in 2012 and of Tërbuni Pukë in 2014–15. Plori was named manager of Besëlidhja in June 2017 and took charge of Kastrioti in June 2018.

He left Burreli for a fourth time in summer 2019 for another spell at Besëlidhja.
