= Gugash Magani =

Albanian footballer and coach

Personal information
- Date of birth: 14 March 1965 (age 61)
- Place of birth: Peqin, Albania
- Position: Midfielder

Youth career
- –1984: Shkumbini Peqin

Senior career*
Years	Team	Apps	(Gls)
1984–1992	Shkumbini		
1992–1994	Besa		
1994–1998	Shkumbini	60+	(8)
1998–1999	Partizani		
1999–2006	Shkumbini	121+	(2+)

Managerial career
- 2007–2009: Shkumbini
- 2009–2011: Flamurtari
- 2011–2012: Besa
- 2012: Shkumbini
- 2013: Teuta
- 2013–2015: Tirana
- 2015–2016: Teuta
- 2016: Flamurtari
- 2016–2017: Teuta
- 2017–2018: Trepça'89
- 2019–2020: Besa
- 2020–2021: Egnatia
- 2022–2023: Besa
- 2023–2024: Lushnja
- 2024–2025: Tirana
- 2025–: Besa
- * Club domestic league appearances and goals

Gugash Magani (born 14 March 1965) is an Albanian football coach and a former player.

== Club career ==
Magani played the majority of his 22-year professional career with Shkumbini Peqin, while also having stints at other Albanian clubs Besa Kavajë and Partizani Tirana.

== Management career ==
=== Tirana ===
On 1 December 2013. Magani was appointed as manager of a struggling Tirana side, following the sacking of Sokol Bulku. He became the 4th manager to take charge of Tirana during the 2013–14 season. He signed a six-month contract and during his presentation he stated that Tirana was going to remain in the top flight.

On 6 February 2014. Magani first match as Tirana manager was a goalless draw at Kastrioti Krujë. The second match in charge brought Mangani his first success as Tirana won the derby against Partizani Tirana. With Magani's tactic and signing of January, Tirana became a more solid side, recording wins against Bylis Ballsh, Besa Kavajë, which removed them from the last position in league.

They started March on 2nd with a 1–1 draw versus Flamurtari at Vlorë, which was followed by a 3–1 home versus Kukësi six days later. Tirana lost the first time under Magani eight days later against the same opponent at Qemal Stafa Stadium.

Tirana secured their top flight spot for another season on 4 May in matchday 32 following a 2–2 draw at Flamurtari Vlorë. After the end of the match, Magani said that he was ready for a contract extension. Tirana finished the championship in 6th place with 50 points.

On 18 May 2015. He resigned after some disappointing results in the league and elimination from the cup against KF Laçi. He was temporary replaced by his assistant Ndubuisi Egbo for the final match of the league, where Tirana won 1–0 against Teuta Durrës. With Magani's tactic and signing of January, Tirana became a more solid side

=== Second term at Teuta Durrës ===
On 2 June 2015, Magani signed with Teuta for the second time in his career, returning in Durrës for the first time since December 2013. Teuta enjoyed a good season with Magani in charge, returning in European competitions for the first time since 2013. On 24 May 2016, Magani resigned from the club by mutual consent.

=== Second spell at Flamurtari Vlorë ===
On 25 May 2016. Magani was appointed new manager of Flamurtari Vlorë by penning a three-year contract, returning in Vlorë for the first time since 2011. His second spell with Flamurtari didn't go as expected, as the team won only one league match in the first seven weeks. Problems outside the field had its impact on the team during Magani's tenure in the club.

On 17 October, following the 4–0 away loss to Partizani Tirana in the matchday 7, Magani resigned from his post. His request was initially denied by club administrator Sinan Idrizi who stated that he was going to talk with him to reconsider his decision.

Magani was not with the team for the next league match against Laçi, and his resign was confirmed on 25 October.

=== Third term at Teuta Durrës ===
On the same day on 25 October, Magani returned to Teuta Durrës for a third spell with the club.

== Personal life ==
His sons Artur Magani and Endrien Magani are both professional footballers, Artur currently play for Ballkani and Endrien plays for Lushnja. He also has a cousin by the name of Everest Magani currently playing for SuperSport United academy.

== Managerial record ==
As of 29 December 2017

Team	From	To	Record				
Team	From	To	G	W	D	L	Win %
Flamurtari Vlorë	21 September 2009	24 July 2011	66	35	11	20	53.03
Besa Kavajë	25 July 2011	30 June 2012	39	21	4	14	53.85
Shkumbini Peqin	1 July 2012	2 November 2012	14	3	4	7	21.43
Teuta Durrës	28 January 2013	16 November 2013	31	15	8	8	48.39
Tirana	1 December 2013	17 May 2015	68	36	19	13	52.94
Teuta Durrës	1 June 2015	24 May 2016	34	19	5	10	55.88
Flamurtari Vlorë	30 May 2016	25 October 2016	9	2	2	5	22.22
Teuta Durrës	27 October 2016	26 December 2017	49	15	11	23	30.61
Trepça'89	29 December 2017	present	0	0	0	0	—
Total			310	146	64	100	47.10
