= Samuel Nikaj =

Albanian footballer and coach

Personal information
- Full name: Samuel Nikaj
- Date of birth: 2 November 1977 (age 48)
- Place of birth: Shkodër, PSR Albania
- Position: Midfielder

Team information
- Current team: Burreli (manager)

Managerial career
- Years: Team
- 2011–2013: Ada
- 2013–2014: Vllaznia (assistant)
- 2014: Vllaznia (interim)
- 2014–2015: Vllaznia (U-19)
- 2015: Mamurrasi
- 2015: Tërbuni
- 2016: Besëlidhja
- 2016–2017: Flamurtari Prishtina
- 2017–2018: Kastrioti
- 2018–2019: Vushtrria
- 2019: Liria
- 2020–2021: Burreli
- 2021–2022: Vushtrria
- 2022–2024: Pogradeci
- 2025: Prizreni
- 2025–: Burreli

Samuel Nikaj (born 2 November 1977 in Shkodër) is an Albanian football coach and former player, who is the current manager of Burreli in the Kategoria e Parë.

== Managerial career ==
Nikaj was appointed manager of Vushtrria in summer 2018 and took charge of fellow Kosovans Liria in June 2019.
