= Artur Magani =

Albanian footballer

Personal information
- Full name: Artur Gugash Magani
- Date of birth: 8 July 1994 (age 32)
- Place of birth: Peqin, Albania
- Position: Forward

Team information
- Current team: Egnatia
- Number: 16

Youth career
- 2010–2012: Shkumbini Peqin

Senior career*
Years	Team	Apps	(Gls)
2011–2015	Shkumbini Peqin	57	(15)
2013	→ Gramshi (loan)	11	(0)
2014	→ Kamza (loan)	12	(3)
2015–2017	Teuta Durrës	66	(13)
2017–2018	Liria Prizren	30	(14)
2018–2019	Feronikeli	20	(6)
2019–2020	Ballkani	30	(6)
2020–2022	Egnatia	40	(15)
2022-2023	Vora	17	(11)

International career^{‡}
2012	Albania U19	4	(1)
- * Club domestic league appearances and goals as of 31 May 2021 ‡ National team caps and goals as of 17 October 2012

Artur Gugash Magani (born 8 July 1994) is an Albanian professional footballer who plays as a forward for Egnatia.

== Club career ==
=== Shkumbini Peqin ===
Magani was the Shkumbini top league goal scorer during the 2014–15 season with nine goals, helping the team to assure the survival.

=== Teuta Durrës ===
In June 2015, Magani left his hometown team and signed for Teuta Durrës, joining up his father, who is the coach of the team. He was given number 16 for the upcoming 2015–16 season. On 30 May 2017, following the end of 2016–17 season in which Magani was below the expectations, he decided to terminate his contract by mutual consent, becoming a free agent in the process.

=== Liria ===
On 10 July 2017, Magani completed a transfer to Football Superleague of Kosovo club Liria Prizren as a free agent.

=== Feronikeli ===
On 31 May 2018, Magani completed a transfer to Football Superleague of Kosovo club Feronikeli.

== International career ==
Magani was part of Albania U19 squad during the qualifying stage of 2013 UEFA European Under-19 Championship, appearing in three matches in Group 7.

== Personal life ==
He is the son of former Shkumbini Peqin, Besa Kavajë and Partizani Tirana player Gugash Magani, who has also coached Shkumbini Peqin, Besa Kavajë, Teuta Durrës and Tirana. His brother Endrien is also a footballer who plays for Lushnja.
