= Pukë =

Pukë Puka
- Municipality
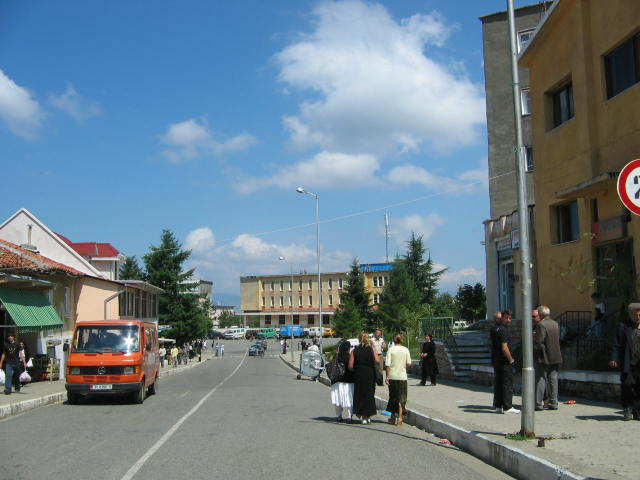
- City Center of Pukë

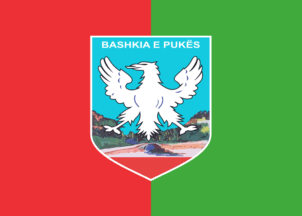
- Flag Emblem

- Location within Albania
- Coordinates: 42°03′N 19°54′E
- Country: Albania
- County: Shkodër

Government
  - Mayor: Rrok Dodaj (BF)

Area
  - Municipality: 505.83 km^{2} (195.30 sq mi)
- Elevation: 890 m (2,920 ft)

Population (2011)
  - Municipality: 11,069
  - Municipality density: 21.883/km^{2} (56.676/sq mi)
  - Administrative unit: 3,607
- Demonym(s): Albanian: Pukjan (m), Pukjane (f)
- Time zone: UTC+1 (CET)
  - Summer (DST): UTC+2 (CEST)
- Postal Code: 4401
- Area Code: (0)212
- Website: bashkiapuke.gov.al

Pukë (Albanian definite form: Puka) is a town, municipality and historical region in northern Albania. It was formed at the 2015 local government reform by the merger of the former municipalities Gjegjan, Pukë, Qelëz, Qerret and Rrapë, that became municipal units. The seat of the municipality is the town Pukë. The total population is 11,069 (2011 census), in a total area of 505.83 km^{2}. The population of the former municipality at the 2011 census was 3,607.

At 838 metres above sea level, the town is one of the highest in elevation in Albania and a well-known ski area. It is 150 km from Albania's capital, Tirana.

== Etymology ==
The toponym may derive from Latin via publica ("public road") as it was located on an old trade route.

== History ==
The settlement is inhabited by the tribe of Puka, itself one of the "seven tribes of Puka" (Albanian: shtatë bajrakët e Pukës). According to tradition, collected by Hyacinthe Hecquard in the mid-19th century, the settlement of Puka had been founded by a Paolo Zenta, who according to Marin Barletius was a relative of Lekë Dukagjini.

The region also has its own Kanun, a set of traditional Albanian laws, and is known as Kanuni i Pukës (English: Canon of Pukë) and used mainly in Northern Albania and Kosovo.

In the 20th century, Pukë was expanded as a military base and a centre of Catholic education. The distinguished Albanian poet Migjeni taught in the town from 1936 to 1937.

Pukë is surrounded by a 400-hectare (1.5 sq mi) pine-coated massif.

As in other parts of Europe, climate change has extended and consolidated the range of the pine processionary moths, who defoliate pines, including in the pinelands of northern Albania.

== Economy ==
Presently one of Albania's poorest settlements, approximately two-thirds of Puka's residents live on social welfare and the municipality is in debt. Alongside that many of its inhabitants have emigrated, mostly to Tirana and abroad, notably England.

The hotel standing in the town square has been upgraded and now boasts a microbrewery producing Puka Beer, which is a lager in draught form. The local football club is KF Tërbuni Pukë.

== Mayors ==
Mayors of Pukë (1992–present)
No.	Name	Term in office
1	Halit Topalli	1992–1996
2	Halit Furriku	1996–2000
3	Ndue Cara	2000–2003
4	Rrustem Strugaj	2003–2011
5	Beqir Arifaj	2011–2015
6	Gjon Gjonaj	2015-2023
7	Rrok Dodaj	2023 (Incumbent)

== Notable people ==
- Etilda Gjonaj - politician, lawyer, and professor
- Altin Lala - former captain of Albania national football team and Hannover 96
- Kristjan Sokoli - NFL player
- Xhovalin Delia - painter
- Fabio Gjonikaj - footballer
- Taulant Marku - footballer
- Sebino Plaku - footballer
- Flavio Prendi - footballer
- Ndoc Mark Gega - patriot
- Millosh Gjergj Nikolla - teacher, poet and writer

== Twin towns – sister cities ==
Pukë is twinned with:

- Signa, Italy

== See also ==
- Berishe
- Dardhe, Korce
- List of mayors of Pukë
- List of ski areas and resorts in Europe

== Sources ==
- Elsie, Robert (2015). The Tribes of Albania: History, Society and Culture. I.B.Tauris. ISBN 978-1-78453-401-1.
- Through The Embers of Chaos ISBN 0-7195-6232-5 (2002), Dervla Murphy

The author refers to processionary disease in Pukë on a cycle trip through Albania, including a stay in the town, described on page 213
