= KF Besëlidhja Lezhë =

Albanian football club

Besëlidhja
- Full name: Klubi i Futbollit Besëlidhja Lezhë
- Nickname: Dragonjtë e Veriut
- Founded: 17 November 1930; 95 years ago as Bardhyli i Leshit Bardhyli (1930–49) Lezha (1949–50) Puna Lezhë (1951–57) Fitore (1958–68) Besëlidhja (1968–present)
- Ground: Besëlidhja Stadium
- Capacity: 5,000
- Owner: Lezhë Municipality
- President: Pjerin Fushaj
- Manager: Mirel Josa
- League: Kategoria e Parë
- 2025–26: Kategoria e Dytë, Group A, 1st (promoted)
Home colours	Away colours

Klubi i Futbollit Besëlidhja Lezhë is an Albanian professional football club based in Lezhë. They are currently competing in Kategoria e Parë. Their home ground is Brian Filipi Stadium.

== History ==
Football in Lezhë dates back to 1916 when a senior Austrian officer introduced two leather balls, complete with inner bladders made from cattle, to the local youth. On June 1, 1920, an amateur team under the name Djelmnia e Leshit played organized matches in nearby Shkodër.

By 1930, the Zogu government, through a decree dated June 6, established the Albanian Sports Federation and mandated the formation of football clubs in regions of the country that lacked such teams. That same year, the first national football championship was launched. Bardhyli i Leshit was officially established on November 17, 1930.

In 1936, the club competed in the Second Division Championship, Group A, where they faced teams like Kongresi i Lushnjes, Tomorri of Berat and Foleta e Lirisë of Krujë. Finishing first in their group, Bardhyli advanced to the final tournament, held in Tirana. On July 26, they triumphed over Shkumbini of Peqin with a 2–0 win and the following day defeated Aleksandri i Madh of Përmet 7–2. These victories earned the team the Second Division championship, securing its promotion to the First Division for the following season.

The club made its debut in the national championship against Teuta of Durrës. Hundreds of fans traveled from Lezhë — by foot, bicycle and car — to witness the inaugural match, which ended in a 1–7 defeat. Bardhyli’s second match against Erzeni, in Shijak, also resulted in a loss (0–4), but the return leg saw Lezhë secure a 5–1 victory, its first official win. Home matches during this period were played at Gryka e Zezë field.

Besëlidhja has participated in the top flight league for 24 seasons, having yet to secure qualification for European competitions.

== Honours ==
- Kategoria e Parë
  - Winners (7): 1969–70, 1977–78, 1979–80, 1983–84, 1986–87, 1992–93, 1999–00
- Kategoria e Dytë
  - Winners (2): 1957, 2025–26

== Records ==
- Biggest Home Victory: 7–0 vs KS Gramozi Ersekë (11.04.2012)
- Biggest Home Defeat: 3–4 vs FK Kukësi (23.04.2012)
- Biggest Away Victory: 9–1 vs Adriatiku 2012 (04.04.2026)
- Biggest Away Defeat: 1–5 vs KF Tirana (21.02.2003)

== Current squad ==
As of 1 September 2026

Note: Flags indicate national team as defined under FIFA eligibility rules; some limited exceptions apply. Players may hold more than one non-FIFA nationality.

No.	Pos.	Nation	Player
1	GK	ALB	Fabjon Myrta
2	DF	ALB	Kujtim Alcani
3	DF	ALB	Arsid Temja
4	MF	KOS	Ardit Topallaj
5	DF	ALB	Stivian Janku
6	MF	GAM	Musa Kambi
7	MF	ALB	Antonio Delaj
8	MF	MKD	Sabit Bilali
9	FW	ALB	Flavio Fusha
10	FW	KOS	Festim Alidema
12	GK	ALB	Albjon Gjoka
13	DF	ALB	Antonio Marku
17	MF	ALB	Erisildo Smaçi (captain)
18	MF	ALB	Kledis Marku

No.	Pos.	Nation	Player
19	DF	ALB	Lorenc Trashi
20	DF	ALB	Patrik Fetaj
21	DF	COL	Jesús Zabala
22	FW	ALB	Gjergji Shyti
23	DF	ALB	Anteo Osmanllari
24	MF	GHA	Abdul Misbawu
25	GK	ALB	Marco Molla
27	MF	ALB	Ardit Hila
33	FW	AZE	Bayraməli Qurbanov
45	FW	NGR	Olamide Ogungbire
57	DF	ALB	Fabio Pjetraj
77	MF	NGR	Joel Osikel
87	DF	ALB	Leon Misja (on loan from Tirana)
99	FW	GHA	Emmanuel Akansase

== List of managers ==
- (Albania) Isuf Pelingu (1971–1975)
- (Albania) Lin Shllaku (1973–1974)
- (Albania) Isuf Pelingu (1981)
- (Albania) Nikolin Lorenci (1982–1983)
- (Albania) Anastas Buneci (1983–1984)
- (Albania) Vasil Bici (1984–1985)
- (Albania) Ritvan Kulli (1992–1993)
- (Albania) Vasil Bici (1993–1995)
- (Albania) Paulin Deda (1995)
- (Albania) Taip Piraniqi (1996)
- (Albania) Luan Vakatana (1999–2000)
- (Albania) Vasil Bici (2001–2002)
- (Albania) Medin Zhega (2002)
- (Albania) Ritvan Kulli (2003)
- (Albania) Xhavit Gruda (2003)
- (Albania) Stavri Nica ( – 11 Sep 2007)
- (Albania) Neptun Bajko (1 Dec 2007 – 22 Feb 2008)
- (Albania) Ilir Gjyla (22 Feb 2008 - Jun 2008)
- (Albania) Alban Bruka (2010)
- (Albania) Ritvan Kulli (2010 - 2012)
- (Albania) Sokol Meta (Aug 2012)
- (Albania) Gledis Lani (2012)
- (Albania) Saimir Malko ((Dec 2012 - Mar 2013)
- (Albania) Sinan Bardhi ((Mar 2013 - Dec 2014)
- (Albania) Ritvan Kulli (2015)
- (Albania) Kreshnik Krepi (Jul 2015 - 25 Jan 2016)
- (Albania) Samuel Nikaj (25 Jan 2016 - Jun 2016)
- (Albania) Stavri Nica (Jul 2016 – Nov 2016)
- (Albania) Alban Bruka (2016–2017)
- (Albania) Elvis Plori (Jun 2017 - Nov 2017)
- (Albania) Gledis Lani (Nov 2017 - May 2018)
- (Albania) Ndriçim Kashami (Jul 2018 - Oct 2018)
- (Albania) Gledis Lani (Oct 2018 - Dec 2018)
- (Albania) Vladimir Gjoni (Dec 2018 - Sep 2019)
- (Albania) Elvis Plori (Sep 2019 - Aug 2020)
- (Albania) Alban Bruka (Aug 2020 - Oct 2022)
- (Albania) Hasan Hoxha (Oct 2022 - Nov 2022)
- (Albania) Nikolin Çoçlli (Nov 2022 - Feb 2023)
- (Albania) Artan Bano (Feb 2023 -Jun 2023)
- (Albania) Dritan Smajli (Jun 2023 - Oct 2024)
- (Albania) Edmond Dalipi (Oct 2024 - Jun 2025)
- (Albania) Elvis Plori (Sep 2025 - Sep 2026)
- (Albania) Ndriçim Shtubina (Sep 2026 - Sep 2026)
- (Albania) Klevis Hima (Sep 2026 - Oct 2026)
- (Albania) Mirel Josa (Oct 2026 - )

== Sponsors ==
Period	Kit manufacturer	Shirt partner
1982–1992	Meyba	None
1992–1998	Joma	None
1998–2006	Vega	None
2011–2012	Adidas	NOKA
2014–	Legea	NOKA

== See also ==
- KB Besëlidhja Lezhë (basketball)
