= KS Kastrioti =

Albanian football club

Kastrioti
- Full name: Klubi Sportiv Kastrioti
- Founded: 1926; 100 years ago
- Ground: Kastrioti Stadium
- Capacity: 8,400
- President: Alban Vogli
- Manager: Sokol Neziri
- League: Kategoria e Parë
- 2025–26: Kategoria e Parë, 6th
Home colours	Away colours

Klubi Sportiv Kastrioti is an Albanian professional football club based in the city of Krujë. The club's home ground used to be the Kastrioti Stadium, but after the stadium got closed and demolished, Kastrioti had to move to Redi Maloku Stadium in Fushë-Krujë, which has a total of 3,000 spectators and they currently compete in the Kategoria e Parë.

== History ==
=== Early years ===
The club was founded in 1926 as the city of Krujë's main sports club. During a brief spell in 1949, the club was dissolved, but was quickly re-established under the name of the city, Krujë. Two years later in 1951, the club was renamed Puna Krujë before reverting it back to simply Krujë again in 1958, which they later added Kastrioti to, in honour of the noble Kastrioti family of which Albania's national hero Skanderbeg hailed from.

=== Rise and fall (1989–2006) ===
For many years the club only competed in the lower divisions of Albanian football, but they managed to achieve promotion to the top tier Albanian Superliga in 1990 for the very first time. During their debut season in the top flight the club finished in 12th place out of 14 teams with a record of 12 wins, 10 draws and 17 losses. The following season they would again finish 2 places from the bottom, in 14th place out of 16 teams, a feat they would replicate the following season once again, but this time the league format had changed and the club was relegated to the Albanian First Division. The club returned to the top flight in 1995 after winning the 1994–95 First Division title and gaining promotion. However, this was only short lived as they were relegated in their first season back after finishing in penultimate place. They would have to wait 10 years to return to the Superliga once again, as they achieved promotion in the 2004–05 season after finishing 3rd in the First Division.

=== Recent seasons (2006–2011) ===
During the 2005–06 season, the club finished in its best league position of 8th place out of 12 teams and secured top flight football for another season. The following season they were relegated after losing in the promotion and relegation play off against KS Lushnja 4–2 on penalties after a goalless stalemate. Kastrioti were immediately promoted after finishing in 3rd place and reaching the playoffs for promotion, where they beat Partizani Tirana 1–0 to gain promotion. The club had to feature in the play off once again after finishing 9th out of 12 teams, but they beat KS Lushnja 1–0 to remain in the top flight. The following season the club finished 8th but narrowly avoided the promotion and relegation play off by goal difference.

=== Present time ===
In the summer of 2011, 75% of the club's shares were sold by the Municipality of Krujë to Alban Sport, Albania's exclusive distributor of Adidas and Reebok clothing. The remaining 25% of the club's shares were held by the Municipality of Krujë. This provided the club with greater resources to invest in the squad and to keep up with the other Superliga sides who were investing heavily at the time. The 2011–12 season proved to be the club's most successful campaign as they finished in 5th place, just one place behind reaching UEFA Europa League qualification stage. They again remained a mid table team, finishing 8th out of 14 teams in the 2012–13 season and remaining comfortably in the league.

== Stadium ==
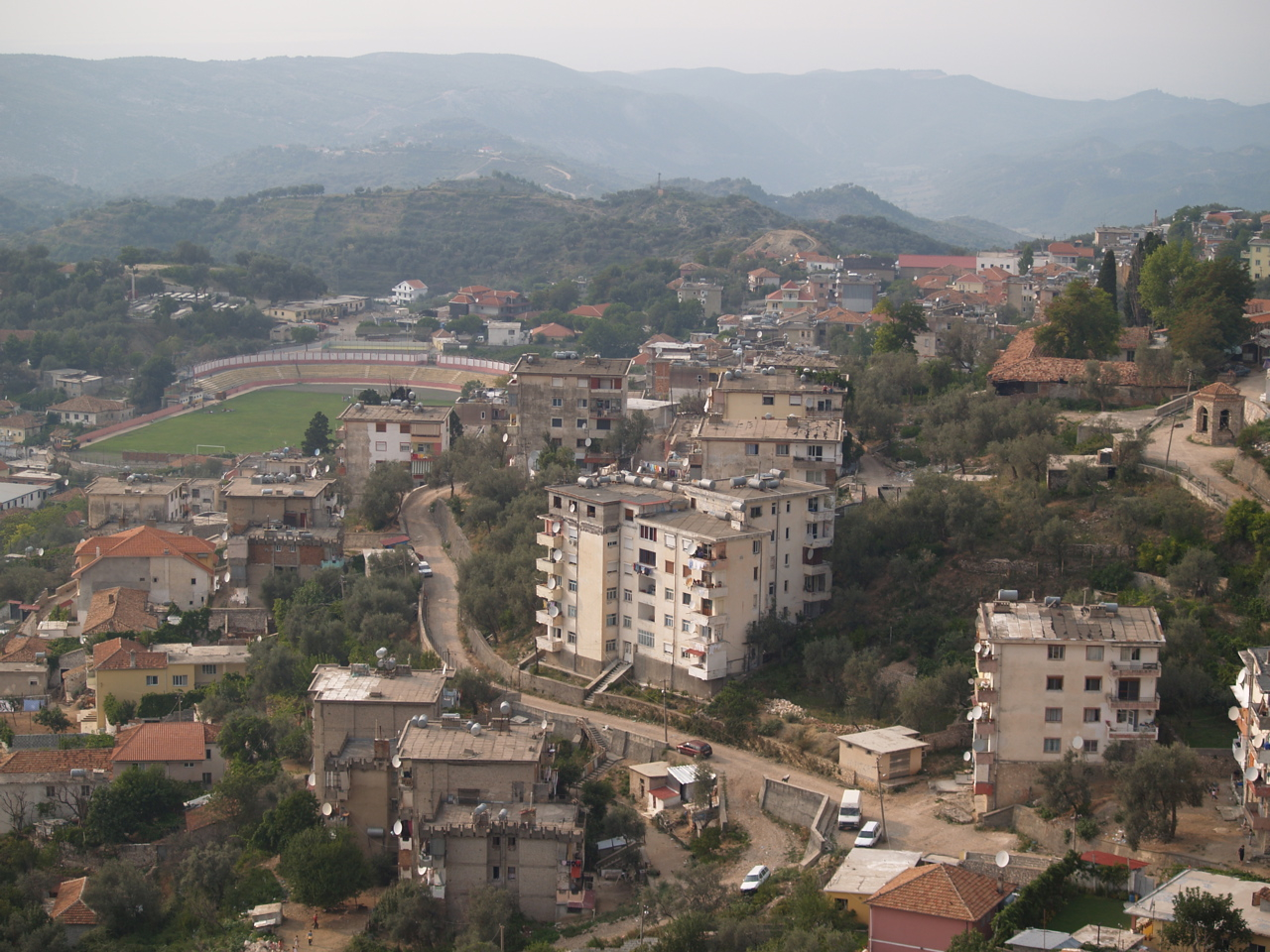
Kastrioti Stadium in the Distance

The stadium of KS Kastrioti is located in Krujë, Albania. Kastrioti Stadium has a capacity of 8,400 seats and the owner of the stadium is the Municipality of Krujë. During the 2018–19 Albanian Superliga, the team has to move down to Fushë-Krujë because the municipality did not renovate the stadium at the right time for the Albanian Superliga so they will play at Redi Maloku Stadium with a capacity of 3,000 seats. Kastrioti Stadium was last renovated during 2008.

== Honours ==
- Kategoria e Parë:
  - Champions (1): 1994–95
- Kategoria e Dytë:
  - Champions (1): 2003–04

== Current squad ==
As of 31 January 2024

Note: Flags indicate national team as defined under FIFA eligibility rules; some limited exceptions apply. Players may hold more than one non-FIFA nationality.

No.	Pos.	Nation	Player
1	GK	ALB	Livio Malaj
4	DF	ALB	Sokol Neziri
9	FW	ALB	Franc Marinaj
10	MF	ALB	Xhuljo Mehmeti
11	FW	ALB	Zajsar Arapi
12	GK	ALB	Tomas Kiri (on loan from Tirana)
14	DF	ALB	Ejon Qyra
15	MF	ALB	Xhafer Hodo (on loan from Partizani Tirana)
17	MF	ALB	Eneid Kodra
18	DF	GHA	Kelvin Edo Dosseh
19	FW	BRA	Jonatan Silva
20	MF	ALB	Enes Kuka
22	DF	ALB	Omar Musaj
23	FW	ALB	Edmond Hoxha

No.	Pos.	Nation	Player
28	MF	ALB	Donald Saliaj
31	FW	ENG	Stuart Gjeta
33	DF	ALB	Realf Zhivanaj
45	MF	ALB	Joan Çela
77	FW	ECU	Joao Quiñónez
—	DF	ALB	Henri Zuna (on loan from Partizani Tirana)
—	MF	ALB	Andrea Pjetri
—	MF	ALB	Gerald Shabani
—	MF	ALB	Eogen Sula
—	FW	ALB	Ilvi Allamani
—	FW	ALB	Dejvid Kapllani
—	FW	ALB	Arbër Mehmetllari
—	FW	ALB	Albi Metani (on loan from Flamurtari)

== Club officials ==
- President: Alban Vogli
- Managing Director: Shkelzen Zhilli
- Board member: Gëzim Rama

== List of managers ==
- (Albania) Robert Jashari (1985–1986)
- (Albania) Ilir Luarasi (1990–1995)
- (Albania) Gjergji Mone (1995)
- (Albania) Spartak Qose (1996)
- (Albania) Robert Jashari (1996–1999)
- (Albania) Ramadan Ndreu (2005–26 Sep 2006)
- (Albania) Petrit Haxhia (26 Sep 2006 – 1 Apr 2007)
- (Albania) Ramadan Ndreu (1 Apr 2007 – 7 Oct 2007)
- (Albania) Vasil Bici (10 Oct 2007 – 3 Feb 2008)
- (Albania) Ramadan Ndreu (3 Feb 2008 – Jun 2008)
- (Montenegro) Derviš Hadžiosmanović (Jul 2008 – 1 Oct 2008)
- (Albania) Ramadan Ndreu (1 Oct 2009 – 18 Apr 2012)
- (Albania) Andrea Marko (18 Apr 2012 – 1 Jul 2012)
- (Albania) Artan Mërgjyshi (1 Jul 2012 – 15 Oct 2012)
- (Albania) Shaban Dollaku (16 Oct 2012 – 31 May 2013)
- (Albania) Ramadan Ndreu (1 July 2013 – 9 Nov 2013)
- (Albania) Kristaq Mile (15 Nov 2013 – 16 Feb 2014)
- (Albania) Nevil Dede (16 Feb 2014 - May 2014)
- (Albania) Alert Alçani (Nov 2014 – Jan 2015)
- (Albania) Elvis Plori (Jul 2015 – Jun 2016)
- (Albania) Samuel Nikaj (Jul 2017 - Jun 2018)
- (Albania) Elvis Plori (Jul 2018 – Oct 2018)
- (Albania) Stavri Nica (Oct 2018 - Jan 2019)
- (Albania) Bledar Devolli (Jan 2019 - May 2019)
- (Albania) Ramadan Ndreu (Jul 2019 - Dec 2021)
- (Albania) Emiliano Çela (Dec 2021 - Dec 2022)
- (Albania) Ardian Mema (Dec 2022 - Feb 2023)
- (Albania) Emiliano Çela (Feb 2023 - May 2023)
- (Albania) Ramadan Ndreu (Jul 2023 - May 2024)
- (Albania) Dorjan Bubeqi (Aug 2024 - Oct 2024)
- (Albania) Stavri Nica (Oct 2024 - Feb 2025)
- (Albania) Klevis Hima (Feb 2025 - May 2025)
- (Albania) Ramadan Ndreu (Jul 2025 - Nov 2026)
- (Albania) Sokol Neziri (Nov 2026 -)
