= KF Tërbuni =

Albanian football club

Tërbuni
- Full name: Klubi i Futbollit Tërbuni
- Nicknames: Shqiponjat e Veriut; Pukjanët
- Founded: March 1936; 90 years ago
- Ground: Ismail Xhemali Stadium
- Capacity: 3,800
- President: Gjon Gjonaj
- Manager: Vladimir Gjoni
- League: Kategoria e Dytë, Group A
- 2025–26: Kategoria e Dytë, Group A, 5th
Home colours	Away colours

Klubi i Futbollit Tërbuni, also known as Tërbuni, is an Albanian football club based in the city of Pukë. The club's home ground is the Ismail Xhemali Stadium and they currently compete in the Kategoria e Dytë.

== History ==
=== Early years ===
The club was founded in 1936 but were not active until the 1940s. Their first competition in a national championship was in 1949, where they contested under the name Puka in the second tier championship. In their inaugural campaign they competed in group 3 of 13, which featured Kopliku, Lezha and the Shkodër agricultural enterprise. During the 1949 campaign, they were knockedout in the first round as Kopliku and Lezha progressed to the second round, with Lezha finishing as joint champions alongside Spartaku Pogradec. The following year, the club again competed in the second tier championship, being eliminated in the first round by Kopliku, losing 5–3 on aggregate following a 4–3 and 1–0 victory. In 1950, the ruling Communist dictatorship forced sports clubs in Albania to change their name to Puna, which literally translates to work, and in 1951 the club competed in group of the second tier under the name Puna Pukë alongside Dinamo Shkodër, Puna Kukës, Puna Lezhë and Spartaku Lezhë, where Puna Lezhë finished as the group and progressed to the next round of the competition. They would not play another competitive game until 1954, where they were in group 1 again in the second tier, this time alongside Dinamo Kukës, Dinamo Shkodër, Puna Lezhë, Spartaku Shkodër, and the Vasil Shanto tobacco plant, where Dinamo Shkodër won the group.

The club were resigned to compete in amateur and lower league competitions for the rest of the 50s and early 60s, but they were promoted back to the second tier in 1964 as they finished runners up in the Albanian Second Division, to reach the new western league format of the Albanian First Division under the new name of Tërbuni Pukë. Their first season return to footballing mainstream in Albania was not fruitful as they finished bottom of the league following just one victory in their 18 games. No teams were relegated during the 1964–65 campaign, meaning Tërbuni kept their place in the league, where they finished second from bottom the following season and avoided relegation after winning 3 and drawing 8 games out of 22. They again finished second from bottom the following season and remained in the league, as they won just once but managed 13 draws. The following season was played in 1968 between May and December, and Tërbuni achieved their best ever result in the league, as they finished in 9th place out of 12 team, with 3 wins, 11 draws to reach a total of 17 points. The Albanian Football Association reverted to the western league format the following season but divided the teams into 2 groups, with a northern and southern division featuring 25 teams in total. Tërbuni were placed in Group A, and they finished in 10th place out of 12 teams to avoid relegation again. They would finish in 8th place of Group A in the 1970–71 campaign, which beat their 9th league position in the 1968 competition. The club had become a regular relegation candidate but had managed to remain in the league following their promotion in 1964, and they finished in 10th place 1972, before finishing 7th in 1973. They finished in 6th place in the 1973–74 campaign, but as there were only 10 teams competing in Group A, the previous season's 7th-place finish out of 14 teams remained their best result. Their 10-year spell in the Albanian First Division came to an end in 1975, as they finished 9th out of 10 teams and were relegated to the Albanian Second Division with 5 wins and 4 draws yielding a total of 14 points, 3 points behind 8th placed Erzeni Shijak.

=== Syla years ===
Former Tërbuni player and wealthy businessman Petrit Syla, who owned Albania's largest scaffolding firm Skela Syla, became the club's president in 2007 and immediately invested heavily to improve the club and achieve promotion to the Albanian First Division. In 2011 he again took over as the club's president and remained in office until November 2012, when Arben Frroku took over as president.

=== Frroku years ===
The club defeated Partizani Tirana 3–1 to win the Albanian Second Division in 2012, which was the club's highest honour in its history. They were promoted to the second tier, the Albanian First Division, and finished in third place in their first season at that level since the 2008–09 campaign.

=== 2015–16: Appearance in the Albanian Superliga ===
KF Tërbuni were promoted from the Northern Division of the Albanian First Division to the Superliga during the 2014/15 season. The final game of the season was against Besëlidhja Lezhë which decided who would be promoted to the Superliga. Tërbuni needed a win or a draw, while Besëlidhja needed a win. The game ended 2–0 in favour of Tërbuni, goals coming in the first half by Senad Lekaj and in the second half by Taulant Marku. Tërbuni ended the 2014–15 Albanian First Division season in the Northern division with 21 wins, 6 draws and 0 losses. They then faced the winners from the Southern Division, Bylis at Elbasan Arena for the First Division cup, but lost 2–0.

For the first time in their history, they appeared in the Superliga in the 2015–16 Albanian Superliga. The team went through managerial change, where Elvis Plori left his post and was replaced by Samuel Nikaj. However, due to poor results, the manager was heavily criticised and quit. He was then replaced by Viktor Gjoni who had managed the team in the past.

The first game of the season was a home game against Tirana which ended in a 2–1 loss. They then played away against newly promoted Bylis, the game ending 2–0 in favour of Tërbuni.

On 17 April 2016, they claimed an historic away win against 5 time consecutive Albanian champions KF Skënderbeu Korçë. The score ended 3–2 to the underdogs, where the winning goal was scored in the last minute of added time by Abaz Karakaçi.

== Fans ==
The Ultras group of Tërbuni are known as the 'Shqiponjat e Veriut' which means 'Eagles of the North'. They are one of the most developed ultras groups in Albania and turn up to all matches which Tërbuni plays. They have their own logo, which makes it easier for them to be recognised by the opposition and by their own fans. Pukjan football fans have always welcomed fans of the opposing team into Puka where the stadium is located and have shown their respect by applauding the opposition, no matter what the score was.

== Stadium ==
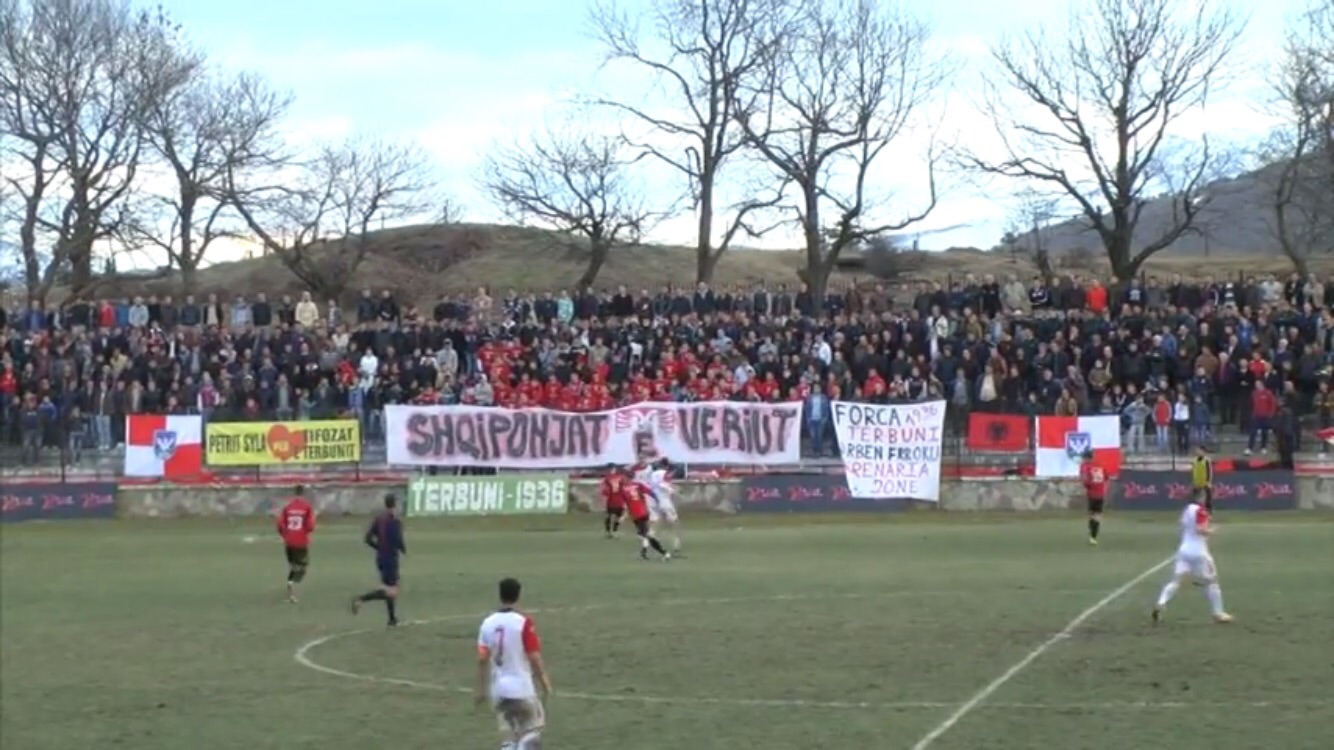
Ismail Xhemali Stadium during the 2014–15 season

The club's home ground is the multi-use Ismail Xhemali Stadium, which is located in Pukë, Albania and has a seated capacity of 3,750 people.

Following Tërbuni Pukë's promotion to the Albanian Superliga for the first time in 2015, the Ismail Xhemali Stadium was inspected by the Albanian Football Association and it was deemed unfit to host top flight football games, and it required reconstruction to meet the minimum requirements of standards set by the Albanian Football Association ahead of the 2015–16 season. Renovations were required on the changing rooms for both players and officials, and seats needed to be installed for the first time in the stadium, rather than benches.

== Honours ==
- Kategoria e Parë
  - Runners-up (1): 2014–15
- Kategoria e Dytë
  - Winners (2): 2011–12, 2018−19
  - Runners-up (3): 1963–64, 1979–80, 2007–08
- Albanian Third Division
  - Winners (1): 2003–04

== Current squad ==
As of 7 December 2019

Note: Flags indicate national team as defined under FIFA eligibility rules; some limited exceptions apply. Players may hold more than one non-FIFA nationality.

No.	Pos.	Nation	Player
2	MF	ALB	Engjell Limani
3	DF	ALB	Indrit Hithi
4	MF	ALB	Migel Metani
5	DF	ALB	Realf Zhivanaj
6	DF	ALB	Denis Myrta
7	MF	ALB	Eligor Palushi
8	DF	ALB	Armaldo Mezini
9	MF	ALB	Granit Osmanollaj
10	MF	ALB	Anxhelo Isaraj
11	FW	ALB	Vjali Mahmuti
12	GK	ALB	Mateo Baçi

No.	Pos.	Nation	Player
13	MF	ALB	Kevin Myslimi
14	DF	ALB	Mark Dodaj
15	DF	ALB	Serdar Zagani
16	DF	ALB	Fabio Hasa
17	FW	ALB	Leonardo Përgjini
18	MF	ALB	Ervin Novakaj
19	MF	ALB	Klaudio Hyseni
20	FW	ALB	Aldo Selenica
23	DF	ALB	Endri Mersini
77	FW	ALB	Rigers Dushku
88	MF	ALB	Dejvis Çangu
99	FW	ALB	Redi Veriu

== List of managers ==
- (Albania) Ilir Dibra (14 Jan 2010 -3 Mar 2011)
- (Montenegro) Derviš Hadžiosmanović (Mar 2011 - Jul 2012)
- (Albania) Edmond Dalipi (Jul 2012 - Sep 2012)
- (Albania) Viktor Gjoni (Sep 2012 - Sep 2013)
- (Albania) Viktor Gjoni (Nov 2013 - Feb 2014)
- (Italy) Gino Gargano (Feb 2014 - Apr 2014)
- (Albania) Elvis Plori (Jul 2014 - May 2015)
- (Albania) Agim Canaj (Jun 2015 - Jul 2015)
- (Albania) Samuel Nikaj (Jul 2015 - Oct 2015)
- (Albania) Eduart Tanushi (Oct 2015 - Oct 2015)
- (Italy) Gino Gargano (Oct 2015 - 29 Nov 2015)
- (Albania) Viktor Gjoni (29 Nov 2015 - Sep 2016)
- (Albania) Ismail Cira (26 Sep 2015 - 20 Nov 2016)
- (Albania) Oltion Kërnaja (Oct 2016 - Jan 2017)
- (Albania) Kreshnik Krepi (Feb 2017 - Jun 2018)
- (Albania) Oltion Kërnaja (Aug 2018 - Dec 2019)
- (Albania) Edmond Dalipi (Jan 2020 - June 2021)
- (Albania) Elvin Beqiri (June 2021 - Feb 2022)
- (Albania) Alert Alcani (Feb 2022 -Feb 2023)
- (Albania) Ramadan Ndreu (Feb 2023 -Jun 2023)
- (Albania) Altin Xhahysa (Jul 2023 -Aug 2023)
- (Albania) Sinan Bardhi (Aug 2023 -Jul 2025)
- (Albania) Anxhelo Suta (Aug 2025 - Jun 2026)
- (Albania) Xhynejt Cutra (Jul 2026 - Oct 2026)
- (Albania) Vladimir Gjoni (Oct 2026 -)

== Presidents ==
Name	Period	Honours
(Albania) Petrit Syla	2007–2010	
(Albania) Petrit Syla	2011–2012	
(Albania) Arben Frroku	2012–2013	
(Albania) Grand Frroku	2013–2016	
(Albania) Gjon Gjonaj	2016–2023	
(Albania) Rrok Dodaj	2023-	
