= 2015–16 KF Bylis season =

Bylis Ballsh
2015–16 season
- President: Agron Kapllanaj
- Head coach: Agim Canaj (until 4 October 2015); Stavri Nica (21 December 2015 – 27 January 2016); Adnan Zildžović (from 28 January 2016)
- Stadium: Adush Muça Stadium
- Kategoria Superiore: 9th
- Albanian Cup: Second round
- Top goalscorer: League: Ardit Hoxhaj (7 goals); All: Ardit Hoxhaj (7 goals)
- Highest home attendance: 1,000 vs Skënderbeu Korçë (26 September 2015, Kategoria Superiore)
- Lowest home attendance: 50 vs Dinamo Tirana (30 September 2015, Albanian Cup)
Home colours	Away colours

The 2015–16 season is Klubi i Futbollit Bylis Ballsh's 42nd competitive season, first season in the Kategoria Superiore and 43rd year in existence as a football club.

== Season overview ==
=== June ===
Bylis Ballsh was very active during the summer transfer window. On 1 June 2015, the 22-year old goalkeeper Shkëlzen Ruçi returned in the squad after spending the second part of 2014–15 season on loan at Elbasani.

=== July ===
On 16 July, Ardit Peposhi signed a two-year deal for Bylis with an option to extend it for another year. Five days later, Bylis purchased the Elbasani midfielder Orgest Gava, who terminated his contract follow the relegation of Elbasani in Albanian First Division. On 24 July, Bylis signed Renato Hyshmeri for free, after having been a free agent since his departure from Tirana. He signed a two-year contract.

=== August ===
On 6 August 2015, they sold the striker Arbër Dhrami to fellow Kategoria Superiore side Tërbuni Pukë. Two days later, Bylis bought Flamur Tairi from Renova for free; he signed a three-year contract. On 9 August, Bylis signed with Emmanuel Mbella from SVN Zweibrücken and Xhelil Asani from FK Napredok, both for free. On 13 August, the club signed the Kosovar defender Ahmet Haliti from Prishtina for an undisclosed fee. One week later, Bylis continued to be active in Kosovo by signing the goalkeeper Kushtrim Mushica from Prishtina. On the very same day, the club purchased the services of veteran midfielder Bekim Kuli, who returned in Ballsh after one-and-a-half year, signing a one-year deal and taking the vacant number 18. On 23 August, Bylis commenced their 2015–16 season with a 2–0 away lose to Kukësi with the goals scored by Mateus and Erick Flores.

== Players ==
=== Squad information ===
As of 9 November 2015

Note: Flags indicate national team as defined under FIFA eligibility rules; some limited exceptions apply. Players may hold more than one non-FIFA nationality.

No.	Pos.	Nation	Player
1	GK	KOS	Kushtrim Mushica
3	DF	ALB	Serxhio Gjonbrati
4	DF	ALB	Elton Basriu
5	DF	ALB	Ergys Kuçi
5	DF	SRB	Borislav Simić
6	DF	ALB	Maringlen Shoshi
7	FW	ALB	Ardit Hoxhaj
8	MF	MKD	Flamur Tairi
9	FW	ALB	Brunild Pepa
10	MF	ALB	Bekim Kuli
11	FW	ALB	Qemal Mustafaraj
12	GK	ALB	Shkëlzen Ruçi

No.	Pos.	Nation	Player
13	MF	MKD	Xhelil Asani
16	FW	BRA	Ronaille Calheira
17	MF	ALB	Ledjon Muçaj
18	DF	FRA	Abdelaye Diakité
19	MF	ALB	Orgest Gava
20	DF	NGR	Sulaimon Adekunle
22	DF	ALB	Ardit Peposhi
29	MF	ALB	Renato Hyshmeri
67	FW	ALB	Enriko Papa
78	MF	FRA	Emmanuel Mbella
88	DF	KOS	Ahmet Haliti
–	GK	ALB	Albi Lina

- Italics players who left the team during the season.
- Bold players who came in the team during the season.

== Transfers ==
=== In ===
==== Summer ====
Date	Pos.	Nationality	Player	Age	Moving from	Fee	Notes	Source
1 June 2015	GK	(Albania)	Shkëlzen Ruçi	22	Elbasani	Free	Loan return	
16 July 2015	MF	(Albania)	Ardit Peposhi	21	Tirana	Free		
21 July 2015	MF	(Albania)	Orgest Gava	25	Elbasani	Free		
24 July 2015	MF	(Albania)	Renato Hyshmeri	26	Tirana	Free		
8 August 2015	MF	(North Macedonia)	Flamur Tairi	24	Renova	Free		
9 August 2015	MF	(France)	Emmanuel Mbella	23	SVN Zweibrücken	Free		
9 August 2015	MF	(North Macedonia)	Xhelil Asani	19	Napredok	Free		
13 August 2015	DF	(Kosovo)	Ahmet Haliti	26	Prishtina	Free		
21 August 2015	GK	(Kosovo)	Kushtrim Mushica	30	Prishtina	Free		
21 August 2015	MF	(Albania)	Bekim Kuli	32	Teuta Durrës	Free		
26 August 2015	DF	(Serbia)	Borislav Simić	28	Inter Zaprešić	Free		
1 September 2015	FW	(Brazil)	Ronaille Calheira	31	Águila	Free		

==== Winter ====
Date	Pos.	Nationality	Player	Age	Moving from	Fee	Notes	Source
7 January 2016	DF	(Albania)	Julian Brahja	35	Tërbuni Pukë	Free		
11 January 2016	GK	(Albania)	Mikel Kaloshi	22	Shkumbini Peqin	N/A	Return from loan	
26 January 2016	DF	(Serbia)	Duško Dukić	29	Alashkert	Free		
29 January 2016	DF	(Albania)	Albi Alla	22	Skënderbeu Korçë	N/A	On loan	
31 January 2016	GK	(Albania)	Stivi Frashëri	25	Tirana	Free		
1 February 2016	FW	(Nigeria)	Solomonson Izuchukwuka	27	Free agent	Free		

=== Out ===
==== Summer ====
Date	Pos.	Nationality	Player	Age	Moving to	Fee	Notes	Source
6 August 2015	FW	(Albania)	Arbër Dhrami	27	Tërbuni Pukë	Free		
31 August 2015	DF	(Albania)	Ergys Kuçi	21	Butrinti Sarandë	N/A	On loan	
31 August 2015	GK	(Albania)	Mikel Kaloshi	22	Shkumbini Peqin	N/A	On loan	
1 September 2015	FW	(Albania)	Gëzim Hyska	20	Naftëtari Kuçovë	Free		
4 September 2015	DF	(Albania)	Eugen Bualli	21	Elbasani	Free		
11 September 2015	DF	(Albania)	Orgest Buzi	20	Dinamo Tirana	N/A	On loan	
12 September 2015	FW	(Albania)	Emiljano Shehaj	26	Elbasani	Free		
15 September 2015	DF	(Albania)	Lorenco Metaj	20	Oriku	Free		

==== Winter ====
Date	Pos.	Nationality	Player	Age	Moving to	Fee	Notes	Source
1 December 2015	FW	(Brazil)	Ronaille Calheira	31	Free agent	Free		
31 January 2016	MF	(Albania)	Bekim Kuli	33	Lushnja	Free		
1 February 2016	MF	(Albania)	Enriko Papa	22	Tirana	Free		

== Competitions ==
=== Kategoria Superiore ===
==== League table ====
Pos	Team	Pld	W	D	L	GF	GA	GD	Pts	Qualification or relegation
6	Vllaznia	36	11	6	19	36	42	−6	39	
7	Laçi	36	8	12	16	30	48	−18	36	
8	Flamurtari (Note: Flamurtari were deducted three points.)	36	9	11	16	34	44	−10	35	
9	Bylis (R)	36	8	8	20	27	53	−26	32	Relegation to the 2016–17 Kategoria e Parë
10	Tërbuni (R)	36	4	6	26	22	81	−59	18	Relegation to the 2016–17 Kategoria e Parë

Source: Albanian Football Association (in Albanian), Soccerway
Rules for classification: 1) Points; 2) Head-to-head points; 3) Head-to-head goal difference; 4) Head-to-head goals scored; 5) Goal difference; 6) Goals scored; 7) Draw.
(R) Relegated

==== Results summary ====
Overall								Home						Away					
Pld	W	D	L	GF	GA	GD	Pts	W	D	L	GF	GA	GD	W	D	L	GF	GA	GD
36	8	8	20	27	53	−26	32	5	5	9	17	22	−5	3	3	11	10	31	−21

Last updated: 18 May 2016.
Source: Competitive matches

==== Results by round ====
Round	1	2	3	4	5	6	7	8	9	10	11	12	13	14	15	16	17	18	19	20	21	22	23	24	25	26	27	28	29	30	31	32	33	34	35	36
Ground	A	H	A	A	H	A	H	A	H	H	A	H	H	A	H	A	H	A	A	H	H	A	H	A	A	H	A	H	H	A	H	A	H	A	H	A
Result	L	L	D	L	L	L	L	D	W	D	L	L	W	L	W	D	L	L	L	W	L	W	D	L	L	D	L	L	W	D	W	L	L	W	D	L
Position	10	10	9	9	9	10	10	10	9	9	5	9	8	8	7	7	8	9	9	9	9	9	9	9	9	9	9	9	9	9	9	9	9	9	9	9

Source: Competitive matches
A = Away; H = Home; W = Win; D = Draw; L = Loss

==== Matches ====
23 August 2015 1	Kukësi	2–0	Bylis Ballsh	Kukës
16:00 CET	Mateus 42'; Erick Flores 90+3'	Report	Gava (yellow card) 15'; Asani (yellow card) 35'; Tairi (yellow card) 90+1'	Stadium: Zeqir Ymeri Stadium; Attendance: 1,500; Referee: Olsi Sokoli

30 August 2015 2	Bylis Ballsh	0–2	Tërbuni Pukë	Gjirokastër (Note: The match was held at Gjirokastër Stadium due to reconstruction of Adush Muça Stadium.)
16:00 CET	Asani (yellow card) 22'; Tairi (yellow card) 38'; Basriu (yellow card) 47'; Shoshi (red card) 60'	Report	Danaj 37'; Lila (yellow card) 46'; Tusha (yellow card) 57' (yellow-red card) 60'; Gërxho (yellow card) 74'; Sulmataj 77'; Brahja (yellow card) 81'; Vatnikaj (yellow card) 86'	Stadium: Gjirokastër Stadium; Attendance: 400; Referee: Laver Alla

12 September 2015 3	Tirana	0–0	Bylis Ballsh	Tirana
18:00 CET		Report	Peposhi (yellow card) 78'; Simić (yellow card) 90'	Stadium: Qemal Stafa Stadium; Attendance: 3,000; Referee: Remzi Sadiku

20 September 2015 4	Laçi	3–1	Bylis Ballsh	Krujë (Note: The match was held at Kastrioti Stadium due to reconstruction of the field of Laçi Stadium.)
15:00 CET	Adeniyi 8'; Veliaj (yellow card) 67'; Meto 80', 84'	Report	Mbella 12'; Diakité (yellow card) 18'	Stadium: Kastrioti Stadium; Attendance: 0 Referee: Lorenc Jemini

26 September 2015 5	Bylis Ballsh	1–4	Skënderbeu Korçë	Ballsh
15:00 CET	Pepa (yellow card) 27'; Gava (yellow card) 42'; Ronaille 81'	Report	Olayinka 3'; Radaš (yellow card) 44'; Lilaj 53'; Salihi 65'; Latifi 84'; Arapi (yellow card) 85'	Stadium: Adush Muça Stadium; Attendance: 1,000; Referee: Enea Jorgji

4 October 2015 6	Teuta Durrës	3–0	Bylis Ballsh	Durrës
15:00 CET	Hila 6' (yellow card) 67'; Musta 24'; Hoxha (yellow card) 31'; Dita 34' (yellow card) 69'	Report	Hyshmeri (yellow card) 21'; Muçaj (yellow card) 57'; Gava (yellow card) 80'	Stadium: Niko Dovana Stadium; Attendance: 1,000; Referee: Klajdi Kola

17 October 2015 7	Bylis Ballsh	1–2	Partizani Tirana	Ballsh
13:00 CET	Peposhi 7' (red card) 90+1'; Basriu (yellow card) 56'; Hoxhaj (yellow card) 69'; Shoshi (yellow card) 69'	Report	Batha 9'; Krasniqi (yellow card) 40'; Daja (yellow card) 54'; Sukaj 90'	Stadium: Adush Muça Stadium; Attendance: 800; Referee: Andi Koçi

25 October 2015 8	Flamurtari Vlorë	0–0	Bylis Ballsh	Vlorë
13:00 CET	Fuštar (yellow card) 2'; Zeqaj (yellow card) 35'; Telushi (yellow card) 67'; Nexhipi (yellow card) 67'; Hoxha (yellow card) 73'; Morina (yellow card) 86'; Halili (yellow card) 90'	Report	Adekunle (yellow card) 5'; Basriu (yellow card) 86'; Simić (yellow card) 86'	Stadium: Flamurtari Stadium; Attendance: 1,000; Referee: Laver Alla

31 October 2015 9	Bylis Ballsh	3–1	Vllaznia Shkodër	Ballsh
14:00 CET	Muçaj 13'; Asani (yellow card) 25'; Ronaille (yellow card) 50'; Shoshi (yellow card) 52'; Pepa 74'; Hoxhaj (yellow card) 77'; Haliti (yellow card) 90+2'; Gava 90+5'	Report	Dragojević (yellow card) 25' (yellow-red card) 54'; Sosa 34'; Sefa (yellow card) 46'; Marku (yellow card) 83'	Stadium: Adush Muça Stadium; Attendance: 500; Referee: Adrian Beqiri

8 November 2015 10	Bylis Ballsh	1–1	Kukësi	Ballsh
13:00 CET	Simić (yellow card) 31'; Mushica (yellow card) 70'; Gava 87'; Pepa (yellow card) 88'	Report	Veliu (yellow card) 56'; Carioca 70' (pen.); Moreira (yellow card) 87'; Flores (yellow card) 88'	Stadium: Adush Muça Stadium; Attendance: 500; Referee: Laver Alla

18 November 2015 11	Tërbuni Pukë	4–2	Bylis Ballsh	Pukë
14:00 CET	Tusha 12'; Vatnikaj 40', 45'; Marku 80'	Report	Pepa 53'; Papa 84'	Stadium: Ismail Xhemali Stadium; Attendance: 1,000; Referee: Andi Koçi

21 November 2015 12	Bylis Ballsh	0–1	Tirana	Ballsh
14:00 CET	Gava (yellow card) 45'; Simić (yellow card) 64'; Basriu (yellow card) 84'	Report	El. Bakaj 45+2' (yellow card) 84'; Vuçaj (yellow card) 15'; Kavdanski (yellow card) 30'; Kërçiku (yellow card) 82'; Muzaka (yellow card) 90+4'	Stadium: Adush Muça Stadium; Attendance: 800; Referee: Eldorjan Hamiti

28 November 2015 13	Bylis Ballsh	1–0	Laçi	Ballsh
13:00 CET	Hyshmeri 45'; Gava (yellow card) 53'; Papa (yellow card) 67'; Shoshi (yellow card) 90+2'	Report	Mitraj (yellow card) 35'	Stadium: Adush Muça Stadium; Attendance: 500; Referee: Adrian Beqiri

3 December 2015 14	Skënderbeu Korçë	4–0	Bylis Ballsh	Korçë
17:00 CET	Progni 44'; Abazi 63'; Berisha 79'; Salihi 90+1'	Report	Basriu (yellow card) 37'; Adekunle (yellow card) 79'	Stadium: Skënderbeu Stadium; Attendance: 2,500; Referee: Klajdi Kola

7 December 2015 15	Bylis Ballsh	2–1	Teuta Durrës	Ballsh
14:00 CET	Muçaj (yellow card) 26'; Pepa (yellow card) 30'; Hoxhaj 31', 90+2'; Gava (yellow card) 38'; Hyshmeri (yellow card) 59'; Peposhi (yellow card) 70'	Report	Çyrbja (yellow card) 51'; Magani (yellow card) 60'; Shkalla (yellow card) 75'; Musta 76'	Stadium: Adush Muça Stadium; Attendance: 0 Referee: Kridens Meta

12 December 2015 16	Partizani Tirana	1–1	Bylis Ballsh	Tirana
14:00 CET	Batha (yellow card) 38' (yellow-red card) 38'; Račić 75'	Report	Hoxhaj 15' (yellow card) 44'; Simić (yellow card) 36'; Ruçi (yellow card) 52'; Mbella (yellow card) 63'; Asani (yellow card) 81'	Stadium: Qemal Stafa Stadium; Attendance: 1,100; Referee: Eldorjan Hamiti

19 December 2015 17	Bylis Ballsh	2–3	Flamurtari Vlorë	Ballsh
13:00 CET	Ruçi (yellow card) 23'; Papa 52'; Pepa 72'; Peposhi (yellow card) 85'	Report	Telushi 24'; Lena 33'; Hoxha (yellow card) 35' (goal) 69'; Lushtaku (yellow card) 59'; Greca (yellow card) 90+2'	Stadium: Adush Muça Stadium; Attendance: 500; Referee: Remzi Sadiku

23 December 2015 18	Vllaznia Shkodër	3–2	Bylis Ballsh	Shkodër
13:00 CET	Shtubina 2'; Çinari 35', 82'; Bardulla (yellow card) 36'; Cicmil (yellow card) 79'	Report	Mbella (yellow card) 23'; Gjonbrati (yellow card) 28'; Asani (yellow card) 50' (yellow-red card) 89'; Simić (yellow card) 79'; Pepa 86'; Hoxhaj 88'	Stadium: Reshit Rusi Stadium; Attendance: 700; Referee: Enea Jorgji

31 January 2016 19	Kukësi	3–0	Bylis Ballsh	Kukës
14:00 CET	Emini 22', 55'; Musolli (yellow card) 35'; Malota (yellow card) 56'; Dvorneković 78'	Report	Gava (yellow card) 18'; Muçaj (yellow card) 35'; Tairi (yellow card) 90+1'	Stadium: Zeqir Ymeri Stadium; Attendance: 1,500; Referee: Olsi Sokoli

6 February 2016 20	Bylis Ballsh	4–0	Tërbuni Pukë	Ballsh
14:00 CET	Pepa 8'; Dukić (yellow card) 19'; Hoxhaj 35'; Brahja 57'; Mbella 88'	Report	Tasić (yellow card) 20'; Borshi (yellow card) 58'	Stadium: Adush Muça Stadium; Attendance: 1,000; Referee: Klajdi Kola

13 February 2016 21	Tirana	2–0	Bylis Ballsh	Tirana
13:10 CET	Papa (yellow card) 68'; Muzaka 74' (pen.); Smajli (yellow card) 87'; Peci 89'	Report	Gava (yellow card) 12'; Hoxhaj (yellow card) 60'	Stadium: Selman Stërmasi Stadium; Attendance: 1,200; Referee: Andi Koçi

21 February 2016 22	Laçi	0–1	Bylis Ballsh	Laç
14:00 CET	Veliaj (yellow card) 59'; Dosti (yellow card) 60'	Report	Mbella (yellow card) 30'; Hoxhaj (yellow card) 37' (yellow-red card) 76'; Brahja (yellow card) 58'; Bilali 72' (yellow card) 77'	Stadium: Laçi Stadium; Attendance: 500; Referee: Kridens Meta

28 February 2016 23	Bylis Ballsh	1–1	Skënderbeu Korçë	Ballsh
14:00 CET	Izuchukwuka 25' (pen.); Peposhi (yellow card) 28'; Simić (yellow card) 60'; Gava (yellow card) 73'; Sahiti (yellow card) 73'; Frashëri (yellow card) 82'	Report	Jashanica (red card) 24'; Salihi 82' (pen.)	Stadium: Adush Muça Stadium; Attendance: 800; Referee: Klajdi Kola

5 March 2016 24	Teuta Durrës	1–0	Bylis Ballsh	Durrës
14:00 CET	Musta 75'; Gripshi (yellow card) 90+4'	Report	Alla (yellow card) 19'; Dukić (yellow card) 39'; Peposhi (yellow card) 45+1'; Edmílson (yellow card) 53'; Simić (yellow card) 66'	Stadium: Niko Dovana Stadium; Attendance: 700; Referee: Eldorjan Hamiti

9 March 2016 25	Bylis Ballsh	0–2	Partizani Tirana	Ballsh
14:00 CET	Alla (yellow card) 18'; Bilali (yellow card) 27'	Report	Vila 11' (yellow card) 36'; Trashi 49'; Torassa (yellow card) 69'; Krasniqi (yellow card) 87'; Daja (yellow card) 88'	Stadium: Adush Muça Stadium; Attendance: 1,000; Referee: Remzi Sadiku

13 March 2016 26	Flamurtari Vlorë	0–0	Bylis Ballsh	Vlorë
16:00 CET	Lacoste (yellow card) 56'; Telushi (red card) 62'; Lushtaku (yellow card) 70'	Report	Muçaj (yellow card) 11'; Dukić (yellow card) 23'; Peposhi (yellow card) 63'; Simić (yellow card) 68' (yellow-red card) 85'; Pepa (yellow card) 69'; Alla (yellow card) 72'; Frashëri (yellow card) 80'	Stadium: Flamurtari Stadium; Attendance: 800; Referee: Edvaldo Durmishi

20 March 2016 27	Bylis Ballsh	0–1	Vllaznia Shkodër	Ballsh
14:00 CET	Lipi (yellow card) 31'; Brahja (yellow card) 52'	Report	Kalaja 8'; Krymi (yellow card) 52'; Dragojević (yellow card) 72'; Bardulla (yellow card) 73'; Erkoceviç (yellow card) 79'	Stadium: Adush Muça Stadium; Attendance: 2,000; Referee: Enea Jorgji

2 April 2016 28	Bylis Ballsh	0–2	Kukësi	Ballsh
16:00 CET	Hoxhaj (yellow card) 13'; Pepa (yellow card) 30'; Dukić (yellow card) 58'; Alla (yellow card) 59'	Report	Dvorneković 10'; Mici (yellow card) 22'; Erick Flores 37'; Emini (yellow card) 86'	Stadium: Adush Muça Stadium; Attendance: 400; Referee: Andi Koçi

9 April 2016 29	Tërbuni Pukë	0–1	Bylis Ballsh	Pukë
16:00 CET	Gavazaj (yellow card) 64'	Report	Bilali 21'; Dukić (yellow card) 44'; Muskaj (yellow card) 70'	Stadium: Ismail Xhemali Stadium; Attendance: 100; Referee: Klajdi Kola

17 April 2016 30	Bylis Ballsh	0–0	Tirana	Ballsh
16:00 CET	Peposhi (yellow card) 6'; Alla (yellow card) 48'; Varea (yellow card) 54'; Tairi (yellow card) 78'	Report	Hoxhallari (yellow card) 59'; Ed. Bakaj (yellow card) 78'; Teqja (yellow card) 90+4'	Stadium: Adush Muça Stadium; Attendance: 1,000; Referee: Kridens Meta

25 April 2016 31	Bylis Ballsh	1–0	Laçi	Ballsh
16:00 CET	Varea (yellow card) 23' (goal) 90'; Hoxhaj (yellow card) 51'; Dukić (yellow card) 77'; Gava (yellow card) 88'; Frashëri (yellow card) 90'	Report	Nimani (yellow card) 61'; Mitraj (yellow card) 74'; Zefi (yellow card) 77'	Stadium: Adush Muça Stadium; Attendance: 2,500; Referee: Adrian Beqiri

30 April 2016 32	Skënderbeu Korçë	3–0	Bylis Ballsh	Korçë
19:00 CET	Salihi 27' (pen.); James 33', 72'; Arapi (yellow card) 43'; Vangjeli (yellow card) 57'; Latifi (yellow card) 90+1'	Report	Tairi (yellow card) 12'; Gava (yellow card) 60'	Stadium: Skënderbeu Stadium; Attendance: 1,500; Referee: Eldorjan Hamiti

4 May 2016 33	Bylis Ballsh	0–1	Teuta Durrës	Ballsh
15:30 CET	Bilali (yellow card) 4'; Gava (yellow card) 29'; Brahja (yellow card) 67'; Muskaj (yellow card) 77'	Report	Hila (yellow card) 4'; Kotobelli (yellow card) 33'; Lukić 35'	Stadium: Adush Muça Stadium; Attendance: 1,000; Referee: Kridens Meta

8 May 2016 34	Partizani Tirana	1–2	Bylis Ballsh	Tirana
19:00 CET	Račić (yellow card) 63' (red card) 90'; Fili 70'	Report	Hoxhaj 24', 86' (yellow card) 86'; Simić (yellow card) 63' (yellow-red card) 90'; Fejzaj (yellow card) 73'; Alla (yellow card) 76'	Stadium: Qemal Stafa Stadium; Attendance: 1,500; Referee: Ditmar Jubica

14 May 2016 35	Bylis Ballsh	0–0	Flamurtari Vlorë	Ballsh
17:30 CET	Dukić (yellow card) 32'; Hyshmeri (yellow card) 45+1'; Izuchukwuka (yellow card) 90'	Report	Lacoste (yellow card) 30'; Pashaj (yellow card) 64'	Stadium: Adush Muça Stadium; Attendance: 4,000; Referee: Enea Jorgji

18 May 2016 36	Vllaznia Shkodër	1–0	Bylis Ballsh	Shkodër
17:00 CET	Kalaja 49'; Krymi (yellow card) 76'	Report	Muskaj (yellow card) 37'; Dukić (yellow card) 48'; Gava (yellow card) 65'; Simić (red card) 72'; Brahja (yellow card) 89'	Stadium: Reshit Rusi Stadium; Attendance: 500; Referee: Adrian Beqiri

=== Albanian Cup ===
==== First round ====
16 September 2015 First leg	Dinamo Tirana	0–1	Bylis Ballsh	Pezë Helmës
15:00 CET	Zorba (yellow card) 53'; Sina (yellow card) 59'	Report	Ronaille 89'	Stadium: Internacional Complex; Attendance: 50; Referee: Indrit Zhuli

30 September 2015 Second leg	Bylis Ballsh	6–0	Dinamo Tirana	Ballsh
14:30 CET	Kuli 14'; Pepa 38'; Muçaj (yellow card) 48'; Mustafaraj 72', 76'; Gjonbrati 74'; Asani (yellow card) 52' (goal) 80'	Report		Stadium: Adush Muça Stadium; Attendance: 50; Referee: Hermal Llapra

==== Second round ====
21 October 2015 First leg	Bylis Ballsh	0–0	Laçi	Ballsh
13:30 CET	Papa (yellow card) 25'; Simić (yellow card) 65'; Mustafaraj (yellow card) 77'	Report	Mitraj (yellow card) 26'; Meto (yellow card) 29'	Stadium: Adush Muça Stadium; Attendance: 300; Referee: Edvaldo Dyrmishi

4 November 2015 Second leg	Laçi	3–2	Bylis Ballsh	Krujë (Note: The match was held at Kastrioti Stadium due to reconstruction of the field of Laçi Stadium.)
14:00 CET	Adeniyi 9', 49' (pen.), 62'; Sefgjinaj (yellow card) 39'; Mitraj (yellow card) 67'	Report	Asani (yellow card) 28' (goal) 42'; Haliti (yellow card) 38'; Buljan 40' (o.g.); Basriu (yellow card) 48' (yellow-red card) 54'; Papa (yellow card) 85'	Stadium: Kastrioti Stadium; Attendance: 50; Referee: Olsi Sokoli

== Statistics ==
=== Squad stats ===
	League	Cup	Total Stats
Games played	36	4	40
Games won	8	2	10
Games drawn	8	1	9
Games lost	20	1	21
Goals scored	27	9	36
Goals conceded	53	3	56
Goal difference	–26	6	–20
Clean sheets	10	3	13

Last updated: 18 May 2016

=== Top scorers ===
No.	Pos.	Nation	Name	Kategoria Superiore	Albanian Cup	Total
7	FW	(Albania)	Ardit Hoxhaj	7	0	7
9	FW	(Albania)	Brunild Pepa	5	1	6
3	DF	(Albania)	Amir Bilali	2	0	2
11	FW	(Albania)	Qemal Mustafaraj	0	2	2
13	MF	(North Macedonia)	Xhelil Asani	0	2	2
16	FW	(Brazil)	Ronaille Calheira	1	1	2
19	MF	(Albania)	Orgest Gava	2	0	2
67	FW	(Albania)	Enriko Papa	2	0	2
78	MF	(France)	Emmanuel Mbella	2	0	2
3	DF	(Albania)	Serxhio Gjonbrati	0	1	1
4	DF	(Albania)	Julian Brahja	1	0	1
9	FW	(Nigeria)	Solomonson Izuchukwuka	1	0	1
10	MF	(Albania)	Bekim Kuli	0	1	1
17	MF	(Albania)	Ledjon Muçaj	1	0	1
22	DF	(Albania)	Ardit Peposhi	1	0	1
29	MF	(Albania)	Renato Hyshmeri	1	0	1
67	FW	(Argentina)	Juan Manuel Varea	1	0	1
#	Own goals			0	1	1
TOTAL				27	9	36

Last updated: 18 May 2016

=== Clean sheets ===
The list is sorted by shirt number when total appearances are equal.

Rnk	No.	Player	Kategoria Superiore	Albanian Cup	Total
1	1	(Albania) Stivi Frashëri	7	0	7
2	1	(Kosovo) Kushtrim Mushica	3	2	5
3	12	(Albania) Shkëlzen Ruçi	0	1	1
TOTALS			10	3	13

Last updated: 18 May 2016.
