= List of Albanian football transfers summer 2015 =

This is a list of Albanian football transfers for the 2015 summer transfer window by club. Only transfers of clubs in the Albanian Superliga are included.

The summer transfer window was open on 1 June 2015, although a few transfers take place prior to that date. The window was closed at midnight on 31 August 2015. Players without a club may join one at any time, either during or in between transfer windows.

== Superliga ==
=== Bylis Ballsh ===
In: Note: Flags indicate national team as defined under FIFA eligibility rules; some limited exceptions apply. Players may hold more than one non-FIFA nationality.

No.	Pos.	Nation	Player
1	GK	KOS	Kushtrim Mushica (from (Kosovo) Prishtina)
5	DF	SRB	Borislav Simić (from (Serbia) Inter Zaprešić)
8	MF	MKD	Flamur Tairi (from (North Macedonia) Renova)
10	MF	ALB	Bekim Kuli (from Teuta Durrës)
12	GK	ALB	Shkëlzen Ruçi (from Elbasani)
13	FW	MKD	Xhelil Asani (from (North Macedonia) Napredok)
16	FW	BRA	Ronaille (from (Malta) Birkirkara)
17	MF	ALB	Orgest Gava (from Elbasani)
21	DF	KOS	Ahmet Haliti (from (Kosovo) Prishtina)
22	MF	ALB	Ardit Peposhi (from Tirana)
29	MF	ALB	Renato Hyshmeri (from Tirana)
78	MF	FRA	Emmanuel Mbella (from (Germany) Zweibrücken)
–	DF	ALB	Arben Muskaj (from (Greece) PAS Giannina)

Out: Note: Flags indicate national team as defined under FIFA eligibility rules; some limited exceptions apply. Players may hold more than one non-FIFA nationality.

No.	Pos.	Nation	Player
3	DF	ALB	Orgest Buzi (to Dinamo Tirana)
4	DF	ALB	Eugen Bualli (to Elbasani)
5	DF	ALB	Ergys Kuçi (to Butrinti Sarandë)
7	FW	ALB	Emiljano Shehaj (to Elbasani)
11	DF	ALB	Lorenco Metaj (to Elbasani)
12	GK	ALB	Mikel Kaloshi (to Shkumbini Peqin)
16	FW	ALB	Gëzim Hyska (to Naftëtari Kuçovë)
19	FW	ALB	Arbër Dhrami (to Tërbuni Pukë)

=== Flamurtari Vlorë ===
In: Note: Flags indicate national team as defined under FIFA eligibility rules; some limited exceptions apply. Players may hold more than one non-FIFA nationality.

No.	Pos.	Nation	Player
1	GK	ALB	Argjent Halili (from Kukësi)
3	MF	KOS	Kushtrim Lushtaku (from Kukësi)
5	DF	CRO	Ivan Fuštar (from (Croatia) Slaven Belupo)
6	DF	ALB	Debatik Curri (from Tirana)
7	MF	CZE	Petr Trapp (from (Lebanon) Salam Zgharta)
9	FW	ALB	Mario Morina (from KF Tirana)
10	MF	MKD	Nderim Nexhipi (from Partizani Tirana)
17	MF	ALB	Bedri Greca (from Tërbuni Pukë)
18	MF	ALB	Hair Zeqiri (from FK Kukësi)
21	MF	ALB	Yll Hoxha (from FK Kukësi)
27	DF	GEO	Giorgi Popkhadze (from (Poland) Jagiellonia Białystok)
28	FW	GEO	Bachana Tskhadadze (from (Azerbaijan) Inter Baku)
85	DF	ALB	Entonio Pashaj (from KF Tirana)

Out: Note: Flags indicate national team as defined under FIFA eligibility rules; some limited exceptions apply. Players may hold more than one non-FIFA nationality.

No.	Pos.	Nation	Player
5	DF	SRB	Vukašin Tomić (Release)
7	MF	MNE	Baćo Nikolić (Release)
11	DF	ALB	Franc Veliu (to FK Kukësi)
13	DF	ALB	Polizoi Arbëri (to Vllaznia Shkodër)
14	MF	ALB	Erjon Vuçaj (to Vllaznia Shkodër)
21	FW	ALB	Arbër Abilaliaj (to Skënderbeu Korçë)
77	MF	ALB	Arsid Kruja (loan return to (Saudi Arabia) Hajer Club)
95	DF	MKD	Yani Urdinov (Release)
99	FW	GEO	Nikoloz Gelashvili (to (Greece) Pafos FC)

=== FK Kukësi ===
In: Note: Flags indicate national team as defined under FIFA eligibility rules; some limited exceptions apply. Players may hold more than one non-FIFA nationality.

No.	Pos.	Nation	Player
2	DF	ALB	Franc Veliu (from Flamurtari Vlorë)
5	DF	ALB	Gentian Muça (on loan from KF Tirana)
9	FW	BRA	Erick Flores (from (Brazil) Boavista)
10	FW	BRA	Jean Carioca (from (Brazil) Tigres do Brasil)
15	FW	BRA	Felipe Moreira (from (Brazil) Alecrim)
17	MF	ALB	Ansi Nika (from Teuta Durrës)
17	MF	BRA	Birungueta (from (Brazil) Linense)
18	MF	ALB	Eglantin Dhima (from Sopoti Librazhd)
19	FW	BRA	Mateus Lima (from (Brazil) Operário)
21	FW	ALB	Renaldo Rama (from (Greece) Fostiras)
25	MF	BRA	Leomir Cruz (from (Brazil) Marília)
31	GK	ALB	Enea Koliqi (from (Greece) Olympiacos Volos)

Out: Note: Flags indicate national team as defined under FIFA eligibility rules; some limited exceptions apply. Players may hold more than one non-FIFA nationality.

No.	Pos.	Nation	Player
1	GK	ALB	Argjent Halili (to Flamurtari Vlorë)
1	GK	MDA	Dumitru Stajila (loan return to (Moldova) Sheriff Tiraspol)
2	DF	ALB	Dritan Smajlaj (to KF Tirana)
5	DF	BRA	Márcio Pit (Free agent)
5	DF	ALB	Gentian Muça (loan return)
6	DF	ALB	Erjon Dushku (to KF Tirana)
8	MF	ALB	Albi Dosti (to (Bulgaria) Montana)
10	MF	KOS	Kushtrim Lushtaku (to Flamurtari Vlorë)
11	FW	ALB	Vilfor Hysa (to Kastrioti Krujë)
19	MF	ALB	Hair Zeqiri (to Flamurtari Vlorë)
20	MF	ALB	Yll Hoxha (to Flamurtari Vlorë)
21	DF	ALB	Roland Peqini (to Tërbuni Pukë)
22	FW	CRO	Pero Pejić (to (Iran) Esteghal)

=== KF Laçi ===
In: Note: Flags indicate national team as defined under FIFA eligibility rules; some limited exceptions apply. Players may hold more than one non-FIFA nationality.

No.	Pos.	Nation	Player
1	GK	ALB	Gentian Selmani (from Kastrioti Krujë)
7	MF	ALB	Olsi Gocaj (from Vllaznia Shkodër)
17	MF	ALB	Arsid Kruja (on loan from (Saudi Arabia) Hajer Club)
33	MF	KOS	Drilon Musaj (from (Kosovo) KF Trepça'89)

Out: Note: Flags indicate national team as defined under FIFA eligibility rules; some limited exceptions apply. Players may hold more than one non-FIFA nationality.

No.	Pos.	Nation	Player
1	GK	ALB	Shpëtim Moçka (to Teuta Durrës)
17	MF	ARG	Alfredo Rafael Sosa (Unattached)
21	MF	ALB	Olsi Teqja (to KF Tirana)

=== Partizani Tirana ===
In: Note: Flags indicate national team as defined under FIFA eligibility rules; some limited exceptions apply. Players may hold more than one non-FIFA nationality.

No.	Pos.	Nation	Player
2	DF	ALB	Harallamb Qaqi (from (Italy) Chievo Verona)
3	DF	MNE	Marko Vidović (from (Hungary) Budapest Honvéd)
6	MF	MNE	Jovan Nikolić (from (Montenegro) Sutjeska Nikšić)
8	MF	ALB	Alsid Tafili (from Vllaznia Shkodër)
9	FW	ALB	Sebino Plaku (from (Poland) Śląsk Wrocław)
11	MF	COL	Carlos Robles (from (Colombia) Deportes Quindío)
15	DF	ALB	Ditmar Bicaj (from (Iran) Tractor Sazi)
20	FW	ALB	Xhevahir Sukaj (from (Iran) Sepahan)
34	FW	ITA	Emanuele Morini (from (Italy) Viterbese)
35	GK	ALB	Bledar Vashaku (from Tomori Berat)
99	DF	ALB	Renaldo Kalari (from KF Tirana)

Out: Note: Flags indicate national team as defined under FIFA eligibility rules; some limited exceptions apply. Players may hold more than one non-FIFA nationality.

No.	Pos.	Nation	Player
6	DF	MKD	Ardian Cuculi (to (North Macedonia) FK Shkëndija)
11	MF	MKD	Nderim Nexhipi (to Flamurtari Vlorë)
18	MF	ALB	Amir Rrahmani (to (Croatia) RNK Split)
20	MF	MKD	Bunjamin Shabani (to (North Macedonia) FK Renova)
30	FW	ALB	Jurgen Vatnikaj (on loan to Tërbuni Pukë)
35	GK	ALB	Fabio Gjonikaj (on loan to Tërbuni Pukë)
77	DF	ALB	Arben Muskaj (loan return to (Greece) PAS Giannina)
88	MF	ALB	Emiljano Vila (to (Greece) Kerkyra)

=== Skënderbeu Korçë ===
In: Note: Flags indicate national team as defined under FIFA eligibility rules; some limited exceptions apply. Players may hold more than one non-FIFA nationality.

No.	Pos.	Nation	Player
6	MF	ALB	Bekim Dema (from Vllaznia Shkodër)
14	FW	ALB	Hamdi Salihi (from (Israel) Hapoel Haifa)
17	FW	BUL	Ventsislav Hristov (on loan from (Croatia) HNK Rijeka)
21	FW	ALB	Arbër Abilaliaj (from Flamurtari Vlorë)
25	MF	KOS	Bujar Shabani (from (Kosovo) KF Feronikeli)
30	MF	BRA	Esquerdinha (from (Brazil) Bragantino)
87	MF	BRA	Djair (from (Brazil) Grêmio CF)
93	GK	POL	Jacek Deniz Troshupa (from (Kosovo) KF Hajvalia)

Out: Note: Flags indicate national team as defined under FIFA eligibility rules; some limited exceptions apply. Players may hold more than one non-FIFA nationality.

No.	Pos.	Nation	Player
9	MF	ALB	Enkeleid Alikaj (to Kastrioti Krujë)
11	FW	BRA	Dhiego Martins (to (Azerbaijan) Inter Baku)
21	FW	MKD	Aco Stojkov (to (North Macedonia) FK Vardar)
31	FW	ALB	Fatjon Sefa (to KF Lushnja)

=== Teuta Durrës ===
In: Note: Flags indicate national team as defined under FIFA eligibility rules; some limited exceptions apply. Players may hold more than one non-FIFA nationality.

No.	Pos.	Nation	Player
3	DF	ALB	Silvester Shkalla (from Dinamo Tirana)
4	DF	SRB	Slavko Lukić (from (Montenegro) Sutjeska Nikšić)
12	GK	ALB	Shpëtim Moçka (from KF Laçi)
16	FW	ALB	Artur Magani (from Shkumbini Peqin)
17	MF	ALB	Eri Lamçja (from KF Elbasani)
18	MF	ALB	Nertil Ferraj (from Dinamo Tirana)
21	DF	KOS	Viktor Kuka (from (Kosovo) FC Prishtina)
23	FW	ALB	Meglid Mihani (from Adriatiku Mamurrasi)
27	MF	ALB	Ardit Hila (from KF Elbasani)
29	MF	ALB	Emiljano Musta (from KF Elbasani)
31	GK	ALB	Andi Xhixha (from KS Burreli)

Out: Note: Flags indicate national team as defined under FIFA eligibility rules; some limited exceptions apply. Players may hold more than one non-FIFA nationality.

No.	Pos.	Nation	Player
2	DF	ALB	Erion Hoxhallari (loan return to KF Tirana)
7	MF	ALB	Ansi Nika (to FK Kukësi)
9	FW	ALB	Mirel Çota (to Sopoti Librazhd)
10	MF	ALB	Bekim Kuli (to Bylis Ballsh)
16	MF	ALB	Shaqir Stafa (to Erzeni Shijak)
20	MF	ALB	Erlind Koreshi (to Kastrioti Krujë)
31	GK	ALB	Andi Xhixha (on loan to Tomori Berat)

=== KF Tirana ===
In: Note: Flags indicate national team as defined under FIFA eligibility rules; some limited exceptions apply. Players may hold more than one non-FIFA nationality.

No.	Pos.	Nation	Player
2	DF	ALB	Dritan Smajli (from FK Kukësi)
3	DF	BUL	Martin Kavdanski (from (Bulgaria) Marek Dupnitsa)
4	DF	ALB	Gentian Muça (loan return)
5	DF	SRB	Dejan Karan (from (Hungary) Kecskeméti TE)
6	DF	ALB	Erjon Dushku (from FK Kukësi)
7	MF	ALB	Gilman Lika (from Vllaznia Shkodër)
10	MF	ALB	Erjon Vuçaj (from Flamurtari Vlorë)
14	FW	BRA	Gilberto Fortunato (from (South Korea) Gwangju FC)
16	DF	AUT	Ronald Gërçaliu (from (Austria) SC Rheindorf Altach)
19	FW	ALB	Elis Bakaj (from (Israel) Hapoel Ra'anana)
21	MF	ALB	Olsi Teqja (from KF Laçi)
24	FW	MKD	Florian Kadriu (from (North Macedonia) FK Zajazi)
28	DF	ALB	Erion Hoxhallari (loan return)
99	FW	JPN	Masato Fukui (from (Montenegro) Sutjeska Nikšić)
–	MF	ALB	Ardit Peposhi (loan return)

Out: Note: Flags indicate national team as defined under FIFA eligibility rules; some limited exceptions apply. Players may hold more than one non-FIFA nationality.

No.	Pos.	Nation	Player
2	DF	ALB	Renaldo Kalari (to Partizani Tirana)
4	DF	ALB	Gentian Muça (on loan to FK Kukësi)
5	DF	ALB	Entonio Pashaj (to Flamurtari Vlorë)
6	DF	ALB	Debatik Curri (to Flamurtari Vlorë)
6	DF	ALB	Erjon Dushku (Unattached)
9	MF	ALB	Renato Hyshmeri (to Bylis Ballsh)
10	FW	ALB	Mario Morina (to Flamurtari Vlorë)
11	FW	BDI	Selemani Ndikumana (to (Angola) Primeiro de Agosto)
12	GK	ALB	Marsel Çaka (to KS Kamza)
19	FW	ALB	Elis Bakaj (to (Israel) Hapoel Ra'anana)
20	FW	CRO	Tomislav Bušić (to (Malaysia) T–Team F.C.)
24	MF	ALB	Jetmir Sefa (to Vllaznia Shkodër)
25	DF	MKD	Kire Ristevski (to (North Macedonia) FK Rabotnički)
26	MF	ALB	Afrim Taku (Unattached)
–	MF	ALB	Ardit Peposhi (to KF Bylis Ballsh)
–	MF	ALB	Allush Gavazaj (on loan to Tërbuni Pukë)

=== Tërbuni Pukë ===
In: Note: Flags indicate national team as defined under FIFA eligibility rules; some limited exceptions apply. Players may hold more than one non-FIFA nationality.

No.	Pos.	Nation	Player
2	DF	ALB	Flavio Prendi (from Kastrioti Krujë)
6	MF	ALB	Allush Gavazaj (on loan from KF Tirana)
8	MF	ALB	Gerald Tushe (from Adriatiku Mamurrasi)
11	MF	ALB	Enco Malindi (from KF Elbasani)
17	FW	ALB	Jurgen Vatnikaj (on loan from Partizani Tirana)
18	MF	LBR	Abel Gebor (from (Finland) FC Honka)
20	FW	ALB	Julian Gerxho (from Apolonia Fier)
22	DF	ALB	Roland Peqini (from FK Kukësi)
TBA	GK	ALB	Fabio Gjonikaj (on loan from Partizani Tirana)
88	FW	ALB	Arbër Dhrami (from Bylis Ballsh)
TBA	MF	ALB	Gentjan Manuka (from Besëlidhja Lezhë)

Out: Note: Flags indicate national team as defined under FIFA eligibility rules; some limited exceptions apply. Players may hold more than one non-FIFA nationality.

No.	Pos.	Nation	Player
1	GK	MNE	Vladan Giljen (to Kastrioti Krujë)
6	DF	ALB	Bruno Kepi (to Kastrioti Krujë)
8	MF	ALB	Xhynejt Çutra (to Dinamo Tirana)
10	FW	ALB	Mustafa Agastra (to Luftëtari Gjirokastër)
11	FW	ALB	Sokol Mziu (to Korabi Peshkopi)
17	MF	ALB	Bedri Greca (to Flamurtari Vlorë)
29	MF	ALB	Senad Lekaj (to Kastrioti Krujë)

=== Vllaznia Shkodër ===
In: Note: Flags indicate national team as defined under FIFA eligibility rules; some limited exceptions apply. Players may hold more than one non-FIFA nationality.

No.	Pos.	Nation	Player
1	GK	MNE	Andrija Dragojević (from (Bosnia and Herzegovina) Velež Mostar)
5	DF	KOS	Adnan Haxhaj (from (Kosovo) FC Prishtina)
8	MF	KOS	Berat Ahmeti (from (Hungary) Újpest FC)
9	FW	LBN	Mohammad Kdouh (from (Finland) FC Ilves)
13	DF	ALB	Polizoi Arbëri (from Flamurtari Vlorë)
16	MF	BIH	Semir Hadžibulić (from (Bosnia and Herzegovina) Mladost V. Obarska)
19	FW	PAR	Santiago Daniel Martinez (from unknown)
20	FW	MNE	Darko Pavićević (from (Hungary) Kecskeméti TE)
21	FW	KOS	Kreshnik Lushtaku (from (Kosovo) Trepça'89)
24	MF	ALB	Jetmir Sefa (from KF Tirana)
59	DF	MNE	Stefan Cicmil (from (Bosnia and Herzegovina) Mladost V. Obarska)

Out: Note: Flags indicate national team as defined under FIFA eligibility rules; some limited exceptions apply. Players may hold more than one non-FIFA nationality.

No.	Pos.	Nation	Player
8	MF	ALB	Bekim Dema (to Skënderbeu Korçë)
14	MF	ALB	Sindri Guri (to Korabi Peshkopi)
15	DF	ALB	Arsen Sykaj (to Besëlidhja Lezhë)
17	MF	ALB	Gilman Lika (to KF Tirana)
18	DF	ALB	Elvin Beqiri (retired)
21	FW	ALB	Arsen Hajdari (to Besëlidhja Lezhë)
22	MF	ALB	Olsi Gocaj (to KF Laçi)
23	MF	ALB	Stivi Vecaj (to Ada Velipojë)
