= 2015–16 Albanian Cup =

Kupa e Shqipërisë

Tournament details
- Country: Albania
- Teams: 36

Final positions
- Champions: Kukësi
- Runners-up: Laçi

Tournament statistics
- Matches played: 63
- Goals scored: 167 (2.65 per match)
- Top goal scorer(s): James Adeniyi; Ardit Shehaj (6 goals each)

2015–16 Albanian Cup (Albanian: Kupa e Shqipërisë) was the sixty-four season of Albania's annual cup competition. KF Laçi are the most recent winners of the competition, that being their second Cup trophy.

Ties are played in a two-legged format similar to those of European competitions. If the aggregate score is tied after both games, the team with the higher number of away goals advances. If the number of away goals is equal in both games, the match is decided by extra time and a penalty shoot-out, if necessary.

== Preliminary round ==
In order to reduce the number of participating teams for the first round to 32, a preliminary tournament is played. In contrast to the main tournament, the preliminary tournament is held as a single-leg knock-out competition. Matches were played on 27 August 2015 and involved the teams from Kategoria e Dytë.

Team 1	Score	Team 2
Naftëtari (III)	3–0	Turbina (III)
Tomori (III)	3–0	Sukthi (III)

== First round ==
All 28 teams of the 2015–16 Superiore and Kategoria e Parë entered in this round along with the two qualifiers from the preliminary round. The first legs were played on 16 September 2015 and the second legs took place on 30 September 2015. Skënderbeu played their matches on 6 and 9 September due to commitments in UEFA Europa League.

Team 1	Agg.	Team 2	1st leg	2nd leg
Tomori (III)	0–5	Skënderbeu (I)	0–3	0–2
Korabi (II)	2–5	Partizani (I)	0–5	2–0
Erzeni (II)	0–3	Tirana (I)	0–1	0–2
Besa (II)	2–4	Laçi (I)	1–3	1–1
Pogradeci (II)	1–5	Vllaznia (I)	1–1	0–4
Shkumbini (II)	2–3	Apolonia (I)	2–2	0–1
Dinamo Tirana (II)	0–7	Bylis (I)	0–1	0–6
Luftëtari (II)	0–4	Lushnja (II)	0–1	0–3
Sopoti (II)	5–2	Butrinti (II)	5–0	0–2
Naftëtari (III)	4–5	Kukësi (I)	3–1	1–4 (a.e.t.)
Oriku (II)	3–5	Flamurtari (I)	1–2	2–3
Ada (II)	2–11	Teuta (I)	1–5	1–6
Kamza (II)	5–3	Elbasani (II)	4–2	1–1
Burreli (II)	0–2	Tërbuni (I)	0–0	0–2
Kastrioti (II)	2–2 (a)	Besëlidhja (II)	1–0	1–2
Iliria (II)	3–0	Adriatiku (II)	1–0	2–0

6 September 2015	Tomori	0–3	Skënderbeu	Fusha e Kompleksit Tropikal, Durrës
17:00 CEST		Report	Abazi 55'; Dema 59', 69'	Attendance: 30; Referee: Xhulio Mema

9 September 2015	Skënderbeu	2–0	Tomori	Skënderbeu Stadium, Korçë
17:30 CEST	Djair 7'; Esquerdinha 44'	Report		Attendance: 100; Referee: Erald Demiraj

Skënderbeu advanced to the second round.

16 September 2015	Korabi	0–5	Partizani	Internacional Complex, Pezë
16:00 CEST		Report	Plaku 8', 32'; Morini 38'; Çunaj 45' (o.g.); Ibrahimi 66' (pen.)	Attendance: 250; Referee: Indrit Ujka

29 September 2015	Partizani	0–2	Korabi	Internacional Complex, Pezë
17:30 CEST		Report	Kolgega 36', 57'	Attendance: 50; Referee: Mikel Dyrmishi

Partizani advanced to the second round.

16 September 2015	Erzeni	0–1	Tirana	Skënder Halili Complex, Tirana
15:00 CEST		Report	Kadriu 82'	Attendance: 300; Referee: Altin Stefi

29 September 2015	Tirana	2–0	Erzeni	Skënder Halili Complex, Tirana
14:30 CEST	Teqja 6'; Bakaj 64'	Report		Attendance: 300; Referee: Skerdi Greca

Tirana advanced to the second round.

16 September 2015	Besa	1–3	Laçi	Besa Stadium, Kavajë
15:00 CEST	Sallaku 73'	Report	Kruja 37'; Nimani 55', 65'	Attendance: 200; Referee: Elidon Halo

30 September 2015	Laçi	1–1	Besa	Internacional Complex, Pezë
16:00 CEST	Vuthaj 82'	Report	Brahimaj 85'	Attendance: 50; Referee: Indrit Myrtja

Laçi advanced to the second round.

16 September 2015	Pogradeci	1–1	Vllaznia	Gjorgji Kyçyku Stadium, Pogradec
15:00 CEST	Çekiçi 83'	Report	Kdouh 17'	Attendance: 200; Referee: Fatjon Xhemalaj

30 September 2015	Vllaznia	4–0	Pogradeci	Reshit Rushi Complex, Shkodër
14:30 CEST	Sosa 3', 33'; Arbëri 13' (pen.); Pavićević 77'	Report		Attendance: 400; Referee: Klodjan Prenga

Vllaznia advanced to the second round.

16 September 2015	Shkumbini	2–2	Apolonia	Shkumbini Stadium, Peqin
15:00 CEST	Lluca 78'; Isaj 90+2'	Report	Andoni 2'; Fili 74'	Attendance: 200; Referee: Erald Demiraj

30 September 2015	Apolonia	1–0	Shkumbini	Loni Papuçiu Stadium, Fier
14:30 CEST	Uzuni 40'	Report		Attendance: 250; Referee: Olsi Sokoli

Apolonia advanced to the second round.

16 September 2015	Dinamo Tirana	0–1	Bylis	Internacional Complex, Pezë
15:00 CEST		Report	Ronaille 89'	Attendance: 50; Referee: Indrit Zhuli

30 September 2015	Bylis	6–0	Dinamo Tirana	Adush Muça Stadium, Ballsh
14:30 CEST	Kuli 14'; Pepa 38'; Mustafaraj 72', 76'; Gjonbrati 74'; Asani 80'	Report		Attendance: 50; Referee: Hermal Llapra

Bylis advanced to the second round.

16 September 2015	Luftëtari	0–1	Lushnja	Gjirokastër Stadium, Gjirokastër
15:00 CEST		Report	30' Allkanjari	Attendance: 300; Referee: Olsion Yzeiraj

30 September 2015	Lushnja	3–0	Luftëtari	Roza Haxhiu Stadium, Lushnje
14:30 CEST	Mezini 14'; Dervishi 29'; Allkanjari 71'	Report		Attendance: 100; Referee: Kreshnik Cjapi

Lushnja advanced to the second round.

16 September 2015	Sopoti	5–0	Butrinti	Internacional Complex, Pezë
15:00 CEST	Bërdufi 25', 41', 75'; Jaupaj 27', 72'	Report		Attendance: 30; Referee: Xhulio Mema

30 September 2015	Butrinti	2–0	Sopoti	Butrinti Stadium, Sarandë
14:30 CEST	Dedaj 48' (pen.); Shaba 50'	Report		Attendance: 150; Referee: Robert Shoshaj

Sopoti advanced to the second round.

16 September 2015	Naftëtari	3–1	Kukësi	Bashkim Sulejmani Stadium, Kuçovë
15:00 CEST	Kopaçi 22', 60'; Behari 66'	Report	Gucaj 8' (o.g.)	Attendance: 300; Referee: Mikel Dyrmishi

30 September 2015	Kukësi	4–1 (a.e.t.)	Naftëtari	Zeqir Ymeri Stadium, Kukës
14:30 CEST	Erick Flores 2'; Jonuzi 44', 118'; Musolli 49'	Report	Daci 73'	Attendance: 1000; Referee: Adrian Beqiri

Kukësi advanced to the second round.

16 September 2015	Oriku	1–2	Flamurtari	Fusha Sportive Orikum, Orikum
15:00 CEST	Nurce 57'	Report	Zeqiri 8' (pen.); Bregu 90'	Attendance: 100; Referee: Alvi Paço

30 September 2015	Flamurtari	3–2	Oriku	Flamurtari Stadium, Vlorë
14:30 CEST	Shehaj 42', 46', 57'	Report	Dervishi 75'; Azizaj 80'	Attendance: 150; Referee: Olsid Ferataj

Flamurtari advanced to the second round.

16 September 2015	Ada	1–5	Teuta	Reshit Rushi Complex, Shkodër
15:00 CEST	Jeong-Ho Kim 75'	Report	Lukić 9'; Gripshi 22', 36'; Hyka 43', 84'	Attendance: 100; Referee: Klodjan Prenga

30 September 2015	Teuta	6–1	Ada	Niko Dovana Stadium, Durrës
14:30 CEST	Hyseni 15', 20'; Mihani 27'; Myrtezani 31'; Ferraj 48'; Lamçja 75'	Report	Lari 22'	Attendance: 30; Referee: Indrit Zhuli

Teuta advanced to the second round.

16 September 2015	Kamza	4–2	Elbasani	Kamëz Stadium, Kamëz
15:00 CEST	Gjini 21', 90+1'; Blloku 50'; Ymeraj 55'	Report	Luta 15'; Shehaj 74'	Attendance: 100; Referee: Albano Stolaj

30 September 2015	Elbasani	1–1	Kamza	Domozdova Stadium, Prrenjas
14:30 CET	Peqini 72'	[https://www.soccerway.com/match/kamza-r7xXEl5S/kf-elbasani-QuVlXiGJ/?mid=fNcVJkpI	Gjini 52'	Attendance: 200; Referee: Erald Demiraj

Kamza advanced to the second round.

16 September 2015	Burreli	0–0	Tërbuni	Liri Ballabani Stadium, Burrel
15:00 CEST		Report		Attendance: 30; Referee: Indrit Myrtja

30 September 2015	Tërbuni	2–0	Burreli	Ismail Xhemali Stadium, Pukë
14:30 CEST	Marku 16'; Gërxho 50'	Report		Attendance: 70; Referee: Edvin Hoxha

Tërbuni advanced to the second round.

16 September 2015	Kastrioti	1–0	Besëlidhja	Kastrioti Stadium, Krujë
15:00 CEST	Malo 39' (pen.)	Report		Attendance: 150; Referee: Besnand Kaimi

30 September 2015	Besëlidhja	2–1	Kastrioti	Besëlidhja Stadium, Lezhë
14:30 CEST	Dibra 15'; Bajić 72'	Report	Djarmati 14'	Attendance: 300; Referee: Fatjon Xhemalaj

Kastrioti advanced to the second round.

16 September 2015	Iliria	1–0	Adriatiku	Redi Maloku Stadium, Fushë-Krujë
15:00 CEST	Doçi 90+3'	Report		Attendance: 200; Referee: Amarildo Gjeci

30 September 2015	Adriatiku	0–2	Iliria	Mamurras Stadium, Mamurras
14:30 CEST		Report	Cani 66'; Tali 83'	Attendance: 50; Referee: Xhenald Rada

Iliria advanced to the second round.

== Second round ==
All 16 qualified teams from first round progressed to the second round. The first legs were played on 21 October 2015 and the second legs took place on 4 November 2015. Skënderbeu played their first match on 12 October and the second on 11 November due to commitments in UEFA Europa League.

Team 1	Agg.	Team 2	1st leg	2nd leg
Sopoti (II)	1–3	Skënderbeu (I)	1–1	0–2
Lushnja (II)	1–6	Partizani (I)	1–3	0–3
Laçi (I)	3–2	Bylis (I)	0–0	3–2
Kukësi (I)	8–1	Iliria (II)	5–0	3–1
Tirana (I)	7–2	Kastrioti (II)	5–1	2–1
Flamurtari (I)	6–0	Tërbuni (I)	1–0	5–0
Teuta (I)	4–0	Kamza (II)	1–0	3–0
Vllaznia (I)	2–1	Apolonia (II)	0–0	2–1

12 October 2015	Sopoti	1–1	Skënderbeu	Internacional Complex, Pezë
13:30 CEST	Çaushaj 40'	Report	Nimaga 87'	Attendance: 100; Referee: Albano Stolaj

15 November 2015	Skënderbeu	2–0	Sopoti	Skënderbeu Stadium, Korçë
13:00 CET	Salihi 13'; Progni 53'	Report		Attendance: 500; Referee: Elvaldo Durmishi

Skënderbeu advances to the quarter finals.

21 October 2015	Lushnja	1–3	Partizani	Abdurrahman Roza Haxhiu Stadium, Lushnje
13:30 CEST	Mezini 39'	Report	Plaku 12', 77'; Račić 60'	Attendance: 300; Referee: Robert Shoshaj

4 November 2015	Partizani	3–0	Lushnja	Kompleksi Stërvitor i Ekipeve Kombëtare, Kamëz
14:00 CET	Ismailaj 4'; Morini 42'; Bylykbashi 76'	Report		Attendance: 30; Referee: Orlando Kuka

Partizani advances to the quarter finals.

21 October 2015	Bylis	0–0	Laçi	Adush Muça Stadium, Ballsh
13:30 CEST		Report		Attendance: 300; Referee: Edvaldo Durmishi

4 November 2015	Laçi	3–2	Bylis	Kastrioti Stadium, (Note: The match was held at Kastrioti Stadium due to reconstruction of the field of Laçi Stadium.) Krujë
14:00 CET	Adeniyi 9', 49' (pen.), 62'	Report	Asani 42'; Buljan 40' (o.g.)	Attendance: 50; Referee: Olsi Sokoli

Laçi advances to the quarter finals.

21 October 2015	Iliria	0–5	Kukësi	Redi Maloku Stadium, Fushë-Krujë
13:30 CEST		Report	Mateus Lima 6'; Leomir Cruz 39', 83'; Shameti 48'; Malota 55'	Attendance: 150; Referee: Besnard Kaimi

4 November 2015	Kukësi	3–1	Iliria	Redi Maloku Stadium, Fushë-Krujë
14:00 CET	Musolli 20'; Mateus Lima 58', 90'	Report	Myrta 81'	Attendance: 50; Referee: Indrit Zhuli

Kukësi advances to the quarter finals.

21 October 2015	Kastrioti	1–5	Tirana	Kastrioti Stadium, Krujë
14:30 CEST	Raboshta 37' (pen.)	Report	Kërçiku 6'; Fukui 14'; Vucaj 31'; Gilberto 47', 86'	Attendance: 0 (Note: The match was played behind the doors closed.); Referee: Eldorjan Hamiti

4 November 2015	Tirana	2–1	Kastrioti	Skënder Halili Complex, Tirana
14:00 CET	Lika 11'; Halili 55' (pen.)	Report	Lekaj 79'	Attendance: 200; Referee: Olsion Yzeiraj

Tirana advances to the quarter finals.

21 October 2015	Tërbuni	0–1	Flamurtari	Ismail Xhemali Stadium, Pukë
13:30 CEST		Report	Fuštar 19'	Attendance: 150; Referee: Erald Demiraj

4 November 2015	Flamurtari	5–0	Tërbuni Pukë	Flamurtari Stadium, Vlorë
14:00 CET	Shehaj 36', 40', 58'; Morina 70'; Bregu 80'	Report		Attendance: 100; Referee: Blerim Ziri

Flamurtari advances to the quarter finals.

21 October 2015	Kamza	0–1	Teuta	Kamëz Stadium, Kamëz
13:30 CEST		Report	Shkalla 25'	Attendance: 200; Referee: Fatjon Xhemalaj

4 November 2015	Teuta	3–0	Kamza	Niko Dovana Stadium, Durrës
14:00 CET	Lukić 35'; Hoxha 67'; Hodo 81'	Report		Attendance: 150; Referee: Eldorjan Hamiti

Teuta advances to the quarter finals.

28 October 2015	Apolonia	0–0	Vllaznia	Loni Papuçiu Stadium, Fier
14:30 CEST		Report		Attendance: 100; Referee: Blerim Ziri

4 November 2015	Vllaznia	2–1	Apolonia	Fusha Sportive Reshit Rusi, Shkodër
14:00 CET	Kalaja 32'; Santiago Martinez 38'	Report	Nako 55'	Attendance: 300; Referee: Remzi Sadiku

Vllaznia advances to the quarter finals.

== Quarter-finals ==
Team 1	Agg.	Team 2	1st leg	2nd leg
Vllaznia (I)	1–2	Skënderbeu (I)	0–0	1–2
Laçi (I)	2–1	Partizani (I)	2–0	0–1
Flamurtari (I)	2–2 (a)	Tirana (I)	0–1	2–1
Teuta (I)	1–2	Kukësi (I)	1–0	0–2

24 January 2016	Vllaznia	0–0	Skënderbeu	Reshit Rusi Stadium, Shkodër
14:00 CET		Report		Attendance: 1,000; Referee: Andi Koçi

17 February 2016	Skënderbeu	2–1	Vllaznia	Skënderbeu Stadium, Korçë
13:30 CET	Djair 7'; Esquerdinha 44'	Report	Marku 87'	Attendance: 100; Referee: Erald Demiraj

Skënderbeu advanced to the semi finals.

23 January 2016	Laçi	2–0	Partizani	Laçi Stadium, Laç
14:00 CET	James 49', 65'	Report		Attendance: 1,000; Referee: Laver Alla

17 February 2016	Partizani	1–0	Laçi	Qemal Stafa Stadium, Tirana
17:00 CET	Sukaj 65'	Report		Attendance: 1,500; Referee: Andi Koçi

Laçi advanced to the semi finals.

24 January 2016	Flamurtari	0–1	Tirana	Flamurtari Stadium, Vlorë
17:00 CET		Report	Malaj 85'	Attendance: 2,200; Referee: Bardhyl Pashaj

17 February 2016	Tirana	1–2	Flamurtari	Selman Stërmasi Stadium, Tirana
17:00 CET	Fukui 47'	Report	Telushi 16'; Lushtaku 67'	Attendance: 1,000; Referee: Laver Alla

Flamurtari advanced to the semi finals.

23 January 2016	Teuta	1–0	Kukësi	Niko Dovana Stadium, Durrës
17:00 CET	Hila 20'	Report		Attendance: 2,000; Referee: Enea Jorgji

17 February 2016	Kukësi	2–0	Teuta	Zeqir Ymeri Stadium, Kukës
13:30 CET	Shameti 35'; Malota 88'	Report		Attendance: 2,031; Referee: Lorenc Jemini

Kukësi advanced to the semi finals.

== Semi-finals ==
The semi-finals were drawn on 23 March 2016. The first legs were played on 6 April and the second legs were played on 20 April 2016.

Team 1	Agg.	Team 2	1st leg	2nd leg
Laçi (I)	2–2 (a)	Skënderbeu (I)	1–0	1–2
Flamurtari (I)	0–4	Kukësi (I)	0–2	0–2

6 April 2016	Laçi	1–0	Skënderbeu	Laçi Stadium, Laç
16:00 CEST	Ćetković 50'	Report		Attendance: 1,200; Referee: Bardhyl Pashaj

20 April 2016	Skënderbeu	2–1	Laçi	Skënderbeu Stadium, Korçë
15:30 CEST	Progni 53'; Plaku 79'	Report	Ćetković 57'	Attendance: 400; Referee: Klajdi Kola

Laçi advanced to the final.

6 April 2016	Flamurtari	0–2	Kukësi	Flamurtari Stadium, Vlorë
19:00 CEST		Report	Hasani 11'; Shameti 19'	Attendance: 1,000; Referee: Lorenc Jemini

20 April 2016	Kukësi	2–0	Flamurtari	Zeqir Ymeri Stadium, Kukës
15:30 CEST	Emini 69' (pen.); Erick Flores 82'	Report		Attendance: 300; Referee: Andi Koçi

Kukësi advanced to the final.

== Final ==
22 May 2016
19:00 CEST

Laçi	1–1 (a.e.t.)	Kukësi
Mitraj 90+4'	Report	Jean Carioca 65'
Penalties
Dosti (penalty missed); Ćetković (penalty scored); Zefi (penalty scored); Buljan (penalty scored)	3–5	(penalty scored) Jean Carioca; (penalty scored) Dvorneković; (penalty scored) Emini; (penalty scored) Hallaçi; (penalty scored) Musolli

Qemal Stafa Stadium, Tirana
Attendance: 5,000
Referee: Marco Guida
