= List of Kosovan football transfers summer 2018 =

This is a list of Kosovan football transfers for the summer sale prior to the 2018–19 season. Only moves from Football Superleague of Kosovo are listed.

== Transfers ==
- All clubs without a flag are Kosovan.
- Flags indicate national team as defined under FIFA eligibility rules. Players may hold more than one non-FIFA nationality.

=== Ballkani ===
In

No.	Pos.	Nation	Player
2	DF	KOS	Besnik Krasniqi (from Vëllaznimi)
6	DF	KOS	Arbër Potoku (from Trepça'89)
10	FW	MKD	Borche Manevski (from (North Macedonia) Pelister)
11	FW	KOS	Jetmir Topalli (from Vushtrria)
12	FW	KOS	Berat Hyseni
14	MF	KOS	Blendi Baftiu (from Prishtina)
17	FW	KOS	Edi Maksutaj (promoted from youth team)
20	MF	KOS	Fatjon Bushati (from (Albania) Besa Kavajë)
23	DF	KOS	Ramiz Bytyqi (from (Slovenia) Sava Kranj)
77	FW	KOS	Leart Emini (from Llapi)
88	MF	KOS	Egzon Shabani (from Llapi)
—	MF	KOS	Endrit Asllanaj (promoted from youth team)

Out

No.	Pos.	Nation	Player
—	DF	KOS	Valon Bytyçi (to Liria)

=== Drenica ===
In

No.	Pos.	Nation	Player
4	MF	KOS	Vigan Rexhaj (from Liria)
8	MF	KOS	Diar Mustafa (from Gjilani)
10	FW	KOS	Isa Eminhaziri (from Gjilani)
18	MF	KOS	Besart Islamaj (from Liria)
25	MF	KOS	Altin Vojvoda (promoted from youth team)
45	MF	KOS	Rrahim Nimani (on loan from Trepça'89)
77	MF	KOS	Qemail Elshani (from Feronikeli)
—	GK	KOS	Drin Hodaj (from KEK)
—	DF	GAM	Bubacarr Sonko
—	MF	GAM	Kabba Gibba
—	MF	GAM	Osman Jannen

Out

No.	Pos.	Nation	Player
4	MF	KOS	Dukagjin Gashi (released)
9	FW	ALB	Denis Peposhi (released)
10	DF	KOS	Genc Hamiti (to Ferizaj)
20	GK	KOS	Flamur Neziri (to Flamurtari)
27	MF	KOS	Drilon Lladrovci (to Feronikeli)

=== Drita ===
In

No.	Pos.	Nation	Player
8	MF	BRA	Edenilson (from (Cyprus) Enosis Neon Paralimni)
9	FW	BRA	Ricardo Verza (on loan from (Brazil) Goiás)
14	MF	KOS	Fillonit Shaqiri (from Gjilani)
16	MF	KOS	Albin Krasniqi (from Ferizaj)
20	MF	ALB	Erjon Vucaj (from (Albania) Vllaznia Shkodër)
22	FW	KOS	Betim Haxhimusa (from Gjilani)
23	DF	KOS	Arbër Shala (from (Albania) Laçi)
27	FW	ALB	Eri Lamçja (from (Albania) Luftëtari Gjirokastër)
29	DF	ALB	Ervis Kaja (from Liria)
31	GK	ALB	Edvan Bakaj (from Liria)
74	MF	KOS	Zgjim Mustafa (from Gjilani)

Out

No.	Pos.	Nation	Player
7	MF	KOS	Astrit Fazliu (to Feronikeli)
8	MF	KOS	Arbnor Ramadani (to Llapi)
9	FW	KOS	Leotrim Kryeziu (to (Switzerland) Lugano)
15	MF	AZE	Amit Guluzade (released)
18	MF	KOS	Drilon Musaj (career break)
22	DF	KOS	Denis Haliti (on loan to Ramiz Sadiku)
24	FW	KOS	Kastriot Rexha (to Feronikeli)
27	FW	KOS	Ylli Bislimi (to 2 Korriku)
30	GK	KOS	Betim Halimi (to (Estonia) Narva Trans)
95	GK	ALB	Krenar Ramadani (released)
99	GK	KOS	Dorart Ramadani (to Dardana)
—	MF	KOS	Alban Rexhepi (to Llapi)
—	MF	KOS	Edison Kqiku (to Gjilani)

=== Ferizaj ===
In

No.	Pos.	Nation	Player
—	GK	MKD	Stefan Istatov (from (North Macedonia) Akademija Pandev)
—	DF	KOS	Adnan Haxhaj (from Liria)
—	DF	KOS	Albert Kaçiku (from Flamurtari)
—	DF	ALB	Arbër Mone (from (Albania) Lushnja)
—	DF	MKD	Bunjamin Asani (from (North Macedonia) Rabotnicki)
—	DF	SRB	Ervin Kačar (from (Montenegro) Petrovac)
—	DF	ALB	Kristi Marku (from (Albania) Lushnja)
—	MF	ALB	Erli Çupi (from (Albania) Kukësi)
—	MF	KOS	Fuad Karabegu (from Gjilani)
—	MF	KOS	Granit Jashari (from Prishtina)
—	MF	KOS	Genc Hamiti (from Drenica)
—	MF	KOS	Mentor Mazrekaj (from Prishtina)
—	FW	KOS	Florim Berbatovci (from Llapi)

Out

No.	Pos.	Nation	Player
—	GK	KOS	Drilon Hodaj (to Liria)
—	DF	MKD	Behar Bardhi (to Vitia)
—	DF	KOS	Dardan Çerkini (to Trepça'89)
—	MF	KOS	Adem Maliqi (to Flamurtari)
—	MF	KOS	Alban Rexhepi (released)
—	MF	KOS	Albin Krasniqi (to Drita)
—	FW	KOS	Fillim Guraziu (released)

=== Feronikeli ===
In

No.	Pos.	Nation	Player
5	DF	KOS	Lapidar Lladrovci (from Trepça '89)
6	DF	KOS	Drilon Lladrovci (from Drenica)
8	FW	ALB	Artur Magani (from Liria)
9	FW	KOS	Mevlan Zeka (from Liria)
10	MF	KOS	Astrit Fazliu (from Drita)
11	MF	BRA	Jean Carioca (from (Brazil) URT)
15	MF	KOS	Alush Gavazaj (from Liria)
21	DF	KOS	Përparim Islami (from Trepça'89)
24	FW	KOS	Kastriot Rexha (from Drita)
30	MF	KOS	Adonis Shala (from (Turkey) Fenerbahçe U21)
35	MF	LBR	Nicholas Andrews (from (Liberia) Monrovia Club Breweries)
61	DF	LBR	Prince Balde (from (Liberia) Monrovia Club Breweries)
93	GK	POL	Jacek Deniz Troshupa (from (Poland) Hetman Zamość)

Out

No.	Pos.	Nation	Player
1	GK	KOS	Faton Maloku (to (Albania) Kukësi)
5	DF	KOS	Ahmet Haliti (to Prishtina)
8	MF	KOS	Mark Milicaj (to Dukagjini)
10	MF	KOS	Qemail Elshani (to Drenica)
13	FW	KOS	Granit Arifaj (to Dukagjini)
18	DF	KOS	Haxhi Shala (to (Switzerland) FC Tuggen)
20	MF	KOS	Behar Maliqi (to Llapi)
29	DF	KOS	Besnik Krasniqi (to Ballkani)
32	FW	ALB	Ardit Jaupaj (loan return to (Albania) Partizani Tirana)
88	MF	CIV	Hamed Koné (to (Switzerland) Neuchâtel Xamax)
—	FW	ALB	Lauren Ismailaj (loan return to (Albania) Partizani Tirana)
—	MF	GER	Trim Krasniçi (to (Austria) SV Kapfenberg)

=== Flamurtari ===
In

No.	Pos.	Nation	Player
—	GK	KOS	Flamur Neziri (from Drenica)
—	DF	GHA	Ben Nash Quansah (from (Ghana) Dreams)
—	DF	KOS	Gentrit Dumani (from Prishtina)
—	DF	KOS	Lorik Maxhuni (from Prishtina)
—	DF	KOS	Veton Shabani (from (Albania) Besa Kavajë)
—	MF	KOS	Adem Maliqi (from Ferizaj)
—	MF	KOS	Agron Bruqi
—	MF	KOS	Alban Reka
—	MF	KOS	Albinot Kozmaqi (promoted from youth team)
—	MF	KOS	Arbnor Zeqiri (from Llapi)
—	MF	KOS	Getoar Dragusha
—	MF	GHA	Nassir Ibrahimi
—	FW	SRB	Iljasa Zulfiu (from (Serbia) Radnik Surdulica)

Out

No.	Pos.	Nation	Player
—	GK	KOS	Kushtrim Mushica (released)
—	DF	KOS	Albert Kaqiku (to Ferizaj)
—	DF	KOS	Rron Statovci (to (Albania) Partizani Tirana)
—	DF	KOS	Samir Sahiti (released)
—	DF	ALB	Valdo Zeqaj (released)
—	MF	KOS	Almir Ajzeraj (to (Albania) Skënderbeu Korçë)
—	FW	CIV	Zie Souleymane Ouattara (released)

=== Gjilani ===
In

No.	Pos.	Nation	Player
2	DF	KOS	Premton Isufi
3	DF	KOS	Armend Halili
6	DF	ALB	Endrien Magani (from (Albania) Lushnja)
7	MF	ALB	Ansi Nika (from (Albania) Laçi)
9	FW	ALB	Brunild Pepa (from (Albania) Lushnja)
10	DF	ALB	Ledion Muçaj (from (Germany) TSV Bogen)
18	FW	GUA	Wilber Pérez (from (Guatemala) Deportivo Sanarate)
19	FW	TRI	Trevin Caesar (from (Cambodia) Svay Rieng)
20	FW	KOS	Edison Kqiku (from Drita)
22	MF	BRA	Jefferson
25	DF	BRA	Maurício Marinho (from (Brazil) Democrata)
27	FW	ALB	Vilfor Hysa (from (Malta) Lija Athletic)
—	FW	GHA	Augustine Awiah
—	FW	BRA	Lucão (from (North Macedonia) Renova)

Out

No.	Pos.	Nation	Player
2	DF	KOS	Armend Thaqi (to Prishtina)
6	MF	KOS	Diar Mustafa (released)
7	MF	KOS	Zgjim Mustafa (to Drita)
9	FW	KOS	Isa Eminhaziri (to Drenica)
10	MF	KOS	Fuat Karabegu (to Ferizaj)
14	MF	KOS	Fillonit Shaqiri (to Drita)
17	FW	KOS	Gëzim Rusi (to Trepça'89)
19	FW	KOS	Fatih Karahoda (released)
21	DF	KOS	Edmond Turku (released)
22	FW	KOS	Betim Haxhimusa (to Drita)
26	MF	CMR	Emmanuel Mbella (to (North Macedonia) Sileks)
28	DF	KOS	Leotrim Bekteshi (to Prishtina)
—	MF	KOS	Besart Morina (released)
—	FW	KOS	Hasan Hyseni (loan return to Trepça'89)
—	FW	BRA	Lucão (to (Greece) Apollon Larissa)
—	FW	KOS	Pleurat Hajdini (released)

=== KEK ===
In

No.	Pos.	Nation	Player
—	GK	KOS	Ardit Nika (on loan from Prishtina)
—	GK	KOS	Habib Gllareva (promoted from youth team)
—	DF	KOS	Ardian Musliu (from Llapi)
—	DF	KOS	Leonat Vitija (on loan from Prishtina)
—	DF	KOS	Muhamet Rakovica
—	DF	KOS	Shpresim Presreshi
—	MF	KOS	Adonis Dodolli
—	MF	KOS	Ardit Preniqi
—	MF	KOS	Atdhe Grajqevci
—	MF	KOS	Drilon Tejeci (from Trepça)
—	MF	KOS	Eris Thaqi
—	MF	KOS	Fatos Zeqiri (from (England) Brentwood Town)
—	MF	KOS	Gëzim Berisha
—	MF	CAN	Visar Hashani
—	FW	AUT	Vigan Veliu

Out

No.	Pos.	Nation	Player
—	GK	KOS	Drin Hodaj (to Drenica)
—	DF	KOS	Arbër Pira (to Trepça'89)
—	DF	KOS	Ardian Hoti (to Llapi)
—	DF	KOS	Eugen Rafuna (released)
—	MF	KOS	Agron Bruqi (to Flamurtari)
—	MF	KOS	Besart Dushi (released)
—	MF	KOS	Donat Hasani (loan return to Prishtina)
—	MF	KOS	Egzon Qerimi (released)
—	MF	KOS	Getoar Dragusha (to Flamurtari)
—	MF	MKD	Valon Zeqiri (to (North Macedonia) Gostivar)
—	MF	KOS	Visar Sahiti (released)
—	FW	KOS	Armend Halimi (released)
—	FW	KOS	Enis Zabërgja (released)
—	FW	MKD	Miran Maksuti (to (North Macedonia) Renova)

=== Liria ===
In

No.	Pos.	Nation	Player
1	GK	KOS	Drilon Hodaj (from Ferizaj)
3	DF	KOS	Rilind Kastrati
4	DF	KOS	Ragip Thaqi
5	DF	ALB	Florian Daci (from (Albania) Turbina Cërrik)
6	MF	ALB	Gerald Tusha
8	MF	KOS	Ramadan Kryeziu
9	FW	ALB	Aldo Mitraj (from (Albania) Sopoti Librazhd)
10	FW	KOS	Liridon Fetahaj (on loan from Prishtina)
13	DF	CMR	Ibrahim Walidjo (from (Serbia) ČSK Čelarevo)
16	MF	KOS	Gentian Benishi (from (Germany) Nöttingen II)
18	MF	KOS	Granit Osmanollaj (from Vëllaznimi)
19	FW	KOS	Fatih Karahoda
20	DF	KOS	Valon Bytyqi (from Ballkani)
21	MF	KOS	Shpresim Fazliaj (from (Switzerland) Plan-les-Ouates)
22	MF	KOS	Robert Gjeraj (from Besa Pejë)
30	DF	ALB	Françesko Lamaj (from (Germany) TuS Heven)
—	MF	KOS	Blendi Memaj (from (Turkey) İstanbul Beylikdüzüspor)
—	MF	KOS	Muhamed Berisha

Out

No.	Pos.	Nation	Player
4	MF	KOS	Vigan Rexhaj (to Drenica)
5	DF	ALB	Elton Basriu (to Trepça'89)
6	MF	ALB	Kristi Kote (to (Albania) Partizani Tirana)
7	MF	KOS	Meriton Korenica (to Prishtina)
8	MF	ALB	Jetmir Sefa (to (Albania) Dinamo Tirana)
9	FW	KOS	Mevlan Zeka (to Feronikeli)
10	MF	KOS	Ilir Mustafa (released)
14	MF	KOS	Alush Gavazaj (to Feronikeli)
16	FW	ALB	Artur Magani (to Feronikeli)
17	MF	KOS	Florent Avdyli (to (Albania) Teuta Durrës)
20	MF	KOS	Roni Gashi (to (Albania) Teuta Durrës)
21	MF	KOS	Besart Islamaj (to Drenica)
23	DF	MKD	Stefan Kocev (to (North Macedonia) Sileks)
25	DF	KOS	Lumbardh Dellova (to (Croatia) Hajduk Split II)
27	FW	ALB	Zenel Gavazaj (to (Albania) Skënderbeu Korçë)
29	MF	ALB	Ervis Kaja (to Drita)
31	GK	ALB	Edvan Bakaj (to Drita)
34	FW	MLI	Abdoulaye Toungara (loan return to (Albania) Flamurtari Vlorë)
44	DF	ALB	Endrit Vrapi (retired)
66	DF	ALB	David Domgjoni (loan return to (Albania) Tirana)
—	DF	KOS	Adnan Haxhaj (to Ferizaj)

=== Llapi ===
In

No.	Pos.	Nation	Player
1	GK	KOS	Bledar Hajdini (from Trepça'89)
2	DF	KOS	Fatbardh Latifi (from Ramiz Sadiku, previously on loan)
4	DF	KOS	Bujar Idrizi (from (Albania) Kukësi)
11	MF	KOS	Fiton Hajdari (from Trepça'89)
17	MF	KOS	Arbnor Ramadani (from Drita)
20	MF	KOS	Behar Maliqi (from Feronikeli)
22	FW	KOS	Shend Kelmendi (from (Albania) Skënderbeu Korçë)
25	GK	ALB	Egland Haxho
23	DF	KOS	Ardian Hoti
27	FW	ALB	Ahmed Januzi (from Prishtina)
95	FW	KOS	Alban Rexhepi (from Drita)
—	DF	ALB	Albi Çekiçi (from (Albania) Pogradeci)
—	DF	BIH	Armin Mujkić (from (Albania) Tomori Berat)
—	DF	KOS	Dardan Sekiraqa (from Prishtina)
—	MF	ALB	Klodian Nuri (from (Albania) Elbasani)

Out

No.	Pos.	Nation	Player
2	DF	KOS	Fatbardh Latifi (to (Spain) Alcorcón C, previously on loan at Ramiz Sadiku)
2	DF	ALB	Xhuljan Turhani (to (Albania) Kamza)
3	DF	KOS	Leutrim Kadriu (released)
4	MF	KOS	Egzon Shabani (released)
11	FW	KOS	Florim Bërbatovci (to Ferizaj)
12	GK	KOS	Arben Beqiri (to Trepça'89)
19	FW	KOS	Mirlind Daku (to (Croatia) Osijek II)
20	DF	KOS	Ardian Musliu (to KEK)
23	MF	KOS	Leart Emini (to Ballkani)
26	MF	KOS	Arbnor Zeqiri (to Flamurtari)
30	MF	USA	Ilirian Gjata (to 2 Korriku)
—	DF	ALB	Albi Çekiçi (to (Albania) Besa Kavajë)
—	FW	KOS	Altin Merlaku (released)

=== Prishtina ===
In

No.	Pos.	Nation	Player
2	DF	KOS	Armend Thaqi (from Gjilani)
8	DF	KOS	Ahmet Haliti (from Feronikeli)
10	MF	KOS	Meriton Korenica (from Liria)
16	MF	KOS	Donat Hasanaj (from KEK, previously on loan)
19	FW	MKD	Alen Jasharoski (from (North Macedonia) Shkupi)
21	MF	KOS	Argjend Mustafa (from Trepça'89)
27	FW	ALB	Mario Morina (from (Albania) Besa Kavajë)
28	DF	KOS	Leotrim Bekteshi (from Gjilani)
35	GK	KOS	Laurit Behluli (promoted from Prishtina U19)
93	MF	KOS	Kastriot Selmani (promoted from Prishtina U19)
—	DF	KOS	Rilind Gërbeshi (promoted from Prishtina U19)
—	DF	MKD	Visar Musliu (from (North Macedonia) Shkëndija, previously on loan)
—	MF	KOS	Granit Jashari (from 2 Korriku, previously on loan)

Out

No.	Pos.	Nation	Player
6	DF	ALB	Debatik Curri (retired)
10	MF	KOS	Mentor Mazrekaj (to Ferizaj)
11	FW	KOS	Liridon Fetahaj (on loan to Liria)
18	DF	KOS	Gentrit Dumani (to Flamurtari)
20	MF	ALB	Shqiprim Taipi (loan return to (North Macedonia) Shkëndija)
21	MF	KOS	Blendi Baftiu (to Ballkani)
22	DF	KOS	Lorik Maxhuni (to Flamurtari)
23	DF	GHA	Ben Nash Quansah (loan return to (Ghana) Dreams)
27	FW	ALB	Ahmed Januzi (to Llapi)
29	MF	MNE	Draško Božović (to (Montenegro) Budućnost Podgorica)
—	GK	KOS	Ardit Nika (on loan to KEK)
—	DF	KOS	Dardan Sekiraqa (to Llapi)
—	DF	KOS	Leonat Vitija (on loan to KEK)
—	DF	KOS	Rilind Gërbeshi (released)
—	DF	MKD	Visar Musliu (to (North Macedonia) Shkëndija)
—	MF	KOS	Granit Jashari (on loan to Ferizaj)

=== Trepça'89 ===
In

No.	Pos.	Nation	Player
1	GK	KOS	Arben Beqiri
5	DF	ALB	Elton Basriu (from Liria)
6	DF	ALB	Maringlen Shoshi (from (Albania) Bylis Ballsh)
8	MF	ALB	Orgest Gava (from (Albania) Lushnja)
11	MF	KOS	Gëzim Rusi (from Gjilani)
12	GK	KOS	Ardit Hyseni
14	FW	ALB	Arb Manaj (from Dukagjini)
16	MF	MKD	Blagoj Gucev (from (North Macedonia) Sileks)
17	FW	NGA	Djibril Diawara
18	DF	KOS	Dardan Qerkini
19	FW	MKD	Martin Mircevski (from (North Macedonia) Belasica)
20	GK	BRA	Victor Golas
21	DF	KOS	Arbër Pira
25	FW	MKD	Antonio Bujčevski (from (North Macedonia) Sileks)
29	MF	ALB	Renato Hyshmeri (from (Albania) Elbasani)
30	FW	MKD	Stojanco Velinov (from (North Macedonia) Rabotnicki)
—	GK	MNE	Marko Radović (from (Montenegro) Sutjeska Nikšić)
—	DF	ALB	Ergis Mersini (from (Albania) Vllaznia Shkodër)
—	DF	MKD	Jasmin Mecinovikj (from (Lebanon) Nejmeh)
—	FW	KOS	Urim Statovci

Out

No.	Pos.	Nation	Player
1	GK	KOS	Bledar Hajdini (to Llapi)
5	DF	ALB	Rexhep Memini (to (Albania) Besa Kavajë)
6	DF	KOS	Lapidar Lladrovci (to Feronikeli)
7	MF	PLE	Mohammad El-Kayed (loan return to (Albania) Skënderbeu Korçë)
8	FW	NGA	Otto John (loan return to (Albania) Skënderbeu Korçë)
11	FW	KOS	Fiton Hajdari (to Llapi)
13	DF	KOS	Arbër Potoku (to Ballkani)
16	FW	KOS	Festim Krasniqi (to Besa Pejë)
18	MF	UKR	Borys Orlovsky (to (Ukraine) Veres Rivne)
19	MF	SWE	Egzon Sekiraça (loan return to (Albania) Skënderbeu Korçë)
20	GK	KOS	Enis Manxholli (to Besa Pejë)
21	DF	KOS	Përparim Islami (to Feronikeli)
22	MF	KOS	Argjend Mustafa (to Prishtina)
23	DF	KOS	Ilir Izmaku (to Vushtrria)
26	FW	KOS	Shend Kelmendi (loan return to (Albania) Skënderbeu Korçë)
30	FW	KOS	Arbnor Muja (to (Germany) Eintracht Braunschweig II)
45	MF	KOS	Rrahim Nimani (on loan to Drenica)
—	GK	MNE	Marko Radović (to (Bosnia and Herzegovina) Goražde)
—	DF	KOS	Edon Pasoma (on loan to Drenica)
—	MF	KOS	Gentian Mazrekaj (on loan to Feronikeli)
—	FW	NGA	Odi Henry Chibuze (on loan to Vëllaznimi)
