= Aladin Sallaku =

Albanian footballer

Personal information
- Date of birth: 4 February 1995 (age 31)
- Place of birth: Tirana, Albania
- Position: Midfielder

Team information
- Current team: Bylis
- Number: 2

Youth career
- –2012: KF Tirana

Senior career*
Years	Team	Apps	(Gls)
2012–2014	Apolonia	20	(1)
2014–2016	Besa Kavajë	45	(6)
2016–2019	Turbina	57	(7)
2019–2020	Bylis	6	(1)
2020	Turbina	5	(1)
2020	Torpedo Kutaisi	11	(0)
2021–	Flamurtari Vlorë	4	(0)
- * Club domestic league appearances and goals as of 28 July 2020

Aladin Sallaku (born 4 February 1995) is an Albanian footballer who plays as a midfielder for Bylis in the Kategoria Superiore.

== Career ==
=== Bylis ===
In January 2020, Sallaku moved to Albanian Superliga club Bylis on a free transfer. He made his league debut for the club on 3 June 2020, coming on as a 70th-minute substitute for Ardit Peposhi in a 3–1 home defeat to KF Tirana.
