= Ardit Hoxhaj =

Albanian footballer

Personal information
- Date of birth: 20 July 1994 (age 32)
- Place of birth: Vlorë, Albania
- Height: 1.81 m (5 ft 11 in)
- Position: Forward

Team information
- Current team: AF Elbasani
- Number: 27

Youth career
- 2010–2012: Flamurtari

Senior career*
Years	Team	Apps	(Gls)
2012–2013	Flamurtari	1	(0)
2013–2014	Himara	12	(0)
2014–2016	Bylis	56	(12)
2016–2019	Skënderbeu	10	(0)
2017	→ Korabi (loan)	15	(0)
2017–2018	→ Flamurtari (loan)	27	(2)
2019	Ferizaj	8	(1)
2019–2020	Flamurtari	33	(8)
2020–2023	Vllaznia Shkodër	94	(20)
2023–	AF Elbasani	23	(6)

International career
2014	Albania U19	1	(0)
2016	Albania U21	1	(0)
- * Club domestic league appearances and goals as of 1 June 2024

Ardit Hoxhaj (born 20 July 1994) is an Albanian professional footballer who plays as a striker for AF Elbasani.

== Club career ==
Hoxhaj started his career with Flamurtari in 2011. In the 2011–12 season, he was part of under-19 squad. In the 2012–13 season as well he played for under-19 side but also featured in the first team under coach Julián Rubio debuting in both competition Kategoria Superiore and Cup during the October 2012 and participating also in other 3 league matches and 1 in cup as an unused substitute.

On 21 June 2016, Hoxhaj was sent on trial to PAS Giannina of Super League Greece. He successfully passed the trial; however, he did not sign a contract with the club due to high economic demand of Bylis.

On 6 September 2016, Hoxhaj completed a transfer to Skënderbeu for an undisclosed fee, signing a contract until June 2019. His spell at the club was marred by his lack of playing time, having appeared only five times in the first part of the season, including two appearances in league, both as substitute, failing thus to make an impact.

On 22 January 2017, Hoxhaj agreed personal terms and signed a two-year contract with Korabi, taking the vacant squad number 11. This turned out to be a fraud, however, as Hoxhaj joined Korabi only on loan until the end of the season. He made his debut in team's 0–1 home defeat to Laçi, as he went on to play 14 more appearances, all of them as starter, failing to score, as Korabi finished the season in the last spot with only 13 points, returning to Kategoria e Parë after one season.

On 10 June 2017, Hoxhaj returned to Flamurtari after four years on a long-season loan deal. He was presented six days later where his transfer was made official, stating: I'm happy to be back home. I'll give the maximum for my city's team. He made his first appearance of the season on 16 September in the 3–1 home win over Lushnja. He opened his scoring account later on 29 October by scoring the winner at Partizani. It was his fourth goal against the capital club, thus making his favourite opponent to score against. Hoxhaj played 27 league matches during the 2017–18 season, scoring twice, as Flamurtari finished in a disappointing 6th-place finish.

Hoxhaj returned to his parent club Skënderbeu in June 2018. Having not played since May 2018, he made his first appearance of the season on 26 September by scoring in a 4–0 home win against Veleçiku in the second leg of 2018–19 Albanian Cup first round; he was forced to abandon the match once again due to another injury. On 5 February of the following year, Hoxhaj announced his departure from the club, citing the lack of first team appearances as the main reason, thus becoming a free agent. On the same day, he also announced that he has joined fellow top flight side Luftëtari. However, due to the transfer being concluded five days after the end of winter transfer market, Hoxhaj become ineligible to play for his new side for the second half of 2018–19 season, as he was registered as Skënderbeu player.

On 11 March 2019, Hoxhaj joined Kosovan club KF Ferizaj.

On 17 August 2020, Vllaznia announced to have signed Hoxhaj on a one-year contract.

== International career ==
He was called up to the Albania under-21 team by coach Redi Jupi for the 2017 UEFA European Under-21 Championship qualification closing match against Israel on 10 October 2016. He debuted for the under-21 national side against Israel replacing Uendi Vecaj at half time in a 4–0 loss.

== Personal life ==
He has cited his role model and favourite footballer the Portuguese striker Cristiano Ronaldo, and he is also a fan of Italian club Milan.

== Career statistics ==
As of 2 February 2019

Club statistics
Club	Season	League			Cup		Europe (Note: Including continental competitions, such as UEFA Champions League and UEFA Europa League)		Total	
Club	Season	Division	Apps	Goals	Apps	Goals	Apps	Goals	Apps	Goals
Flamurtari	2012–13	Kategoria Superiore	1	0	1	0	—		2	0
Flamurtari	2013–14	Kategoria Superiore	0	0	3	0	—		3	0
Flamurtari	Total		1	0	4	0	—		5	0
Himara	2013–14	Kategoria e Parë	12	0	—		—		12	0
Bylis	2014–15	Kategoria e Parë	25	5	3	0	—		28	5
Bylis	2015–16	Kategoria e Parë	31	7	4	0	—		35	7
Bylis	Total		56	12	7	0	—		63	12
Skënderbeu	2016–17	Kategoria Superiore	2	0	3	0	—		5	0
Skënderbeu	2018–19	Kategoria Superiore	8	1	2	1	—		10	2
Skënderbeu	Total		10	1	5	1	—		15	2
Korabi (loan)	2016–17	Kategoria Superiore	15	0	—		—		15	0
Flamurtari (loan)	2017–18	Kategoria Superiore	27	2	7	2	—		34	4
Luftëtari	2016–17	Kategoria Superiore	0	0	0	0	—		0	0
Career total			121	15	22	2	—		143	17

== Honours ==
Bylis

- Kategoria e Parë: 2014–15

Skënderbeu

- Albanian Supercup: 2018
