= Serxhio Gjonbrati =

Albanian footballer (born 1993)

Personal information
- Full name: Serxhio Gjonbrati
- Date of birth: 6 December 1993 (age 32)
- Place of birth: Vlorë, Albania
- Position: Defender

Team information
- Current team: Butrinti

Youth career
- 2011–2012: Flamurtari

Senior career*
Years	Team	Apps	(Gls)
2012–2014	Himara	43	(1)
2014–2015	Bylis	32	(4)
2015–	Butrinti	11	(0)
- * Club domestic league appearances and goals

Serxhio Gjonbrati (born 6 December 1993) is an Albanian professional footballer who plays for Butrinti in the Albanian First Division.

== Club career ==
Gjonbrati joined Bylis after three seasons at Himara in summer 2014.
