= Andi Xhixha =

Albanian footballer (born 1991)

Personal information
- Full name: Andi Qani Xhixha
- Date of birth: 15 April 1991 (age 35)
- Place of birth: Durrës, Albania
- Position: Goalkeeper

Youth career
- 2004–2008: Burreli
- 2008–2010: Teuta

Senior career*
Years	Team	Apps	(Gls)
2010–2011	Burreli	20	(0)
2011–2012	Apolonia	9	(0)
2012–2013	Burreli	29	(0)
2013	Mamurrasi	14	(0)
2014–2015	Burreli	33	(0)
2015	Teuta	0	(0)
2015	→ Tomori (loan)		
2016–2017	Burreli	39	(0)
- * Club domestic league appearances and goals

Andi Qani Xhixha (born 15 April 1991) is an Albanian footballer who most recently played as a goalkeeper for Burreli in the Albanian First Division.
