= Ledjon Muçaj =

Albanian footballer

Personal information
- Date of birth: 4 September 1992 (age 34)
- Place of birth: Fier, Albania
- Height: 1.78 m (5 ft 10 in)
- Position: Midfielder

Youth career
- –2007: Apolonia Fier
- 2006–2008: Bylis Ballsh
- 2008–2009: Real Zaragoza

Senior career*
Years	Team	Apps	(Gls)
2009–2010	Bylis Ballsh	14	(0)
2010–2013	Apolonia Fier	48	(0)
2013–2015	Besa Kavajë	33	(1)
2015–2017	Bylis Ballsh	43	(3)
2017–2018	TSV Bogen		
2018	Gjilani	10	(0)
2019	Ballkani	14	(0)
2019–2020	Vushtrria	12	(0)
2020–2022	Besa Kavajë	51	(1)
2022–2023	Labëria		
- * Club domestic league appearances and goals as of 7 May 2022

Ledjon Muçaj (born 4 September 1992) is an Albanian footballer who plays as a midfielder.
