= Solomonson Izuchukwuka =

Nigerian footballer

Personal information
- Date of birth: 23 December 1988 (age 37)
- Place of birth: Ekwulobia, Aguata, Nigeria
- Height: 1.81 m (5 ft 11 in)
- Position: Forward

Senior career*
Years	Team	Apps	(Gls)
2011–2013	Bylis Ballsh	43	(19)
2014	Kukësi	13	(2)
2015–2017	Bylis Ballsh	26	(6)
2018–2019	Baf Ülkü Yurdu		
- * Club domestic league appearances and goals

Solomonson Izuchukwuka (born 23 December 1988) is a Nigerian former footballer who played as a forward.
