= Sulaimon Adekunle =

Nigerian footballer (born 1990)

Personal information
- Full name: Sulaimon Bolaji Adekunle
- Date of birth: 26 October 1990 (age 36)
- Place of birth: Ibadan, Nigeria
- Positions: Defender; midfielder

Team information
- Current team: Bylis Ballsh
- Number: 20

Senior career*
Years	Team	Apps	(Gls)
2011–2012	Shooting Stars	10	(0)
2012–2015	Apolonia Fier	68	(3)
2015–2016	Bylis Ballsh	13	(0)
2016	Butrinti	12	(0)
- * Club domestic league appearances and goals

Sulaimon Bolaji Adekunle (born 26 October 1990) is a Nigerian former footballer.
