= Lorenco Metaj =

Albanian footballer

Personal information
- Full name: Lorenco Metaj
- Date of birth: 16 September 1994 (age 32)
- Place of birth: Vlorë, Albania
- Position: Defender

Team information
- Current team: Oriku
- Number: 19

Youth career
- 2011–2013: Flamurtari Vlorë

Senior career*
Years	Team	Apps	(Gls)
2013–2014	Flamurtari	1	(0)
2013–2014	→ Himara (loan)	27	(1)
2014–2017	Bylis	18	(0)
2015–2016	→ Oriku (loan)		
2017–	Oriku	23	(0)
- * Club domestic league appearances and goals as of 13 December 2019

Lorenco Metaj (born 16 September 1994 in Fier) is an Albanian professional footballer who plays for Oriku in the Albanian First Division.
