= Pablo Lacoste =

Uruguayan footballer (born 1988)

Personal information
- Full name: Pablo Martín Lacoste Icardi
- Date of birth: 15 January 1988 (age 38)
- Place of birth: Montevideo, Uruguay
- Height: 1.88 m (6 ft 2 in)
- Position: Centre back

Team information
- Current team: Cerro
- Number: 31

Youth career
- 2002–2003: Defensor Sporting
- 2004–2008: Danubio
- 2009–2010: Racing CM

Senior career*
Years	Team	Apps	(Gls)
2010–2019	Racing Montevideo	150	(1)
2016	→ Flamurtari Vlorë (loan)	17	(1)
2016	→ Villa Teresa (loan)	9	(2)
2020–	Cerro	15	(0)
- * Club domestic league appearances and goals as of 19:35, 21 January 2021 (UTC)

Pablo Martín Lacoste Icardi (born 15 January 1988) is a Uruguayan footballer who currently plays for C.A. Cerro.
