= Enriko Papa =

Albanian footballer

Personal information
- Date of birth: 12 March 1993 (age 33)
- Place of birth: Kuçovë, Albania
- Height: 1.78 m (5 ft 10 in)
- Position: Central midfielder

Team information
- Current team: Botoșani
- Number: 67

Youth career
- –2012: Apolonia

Senior career*
| Years | Team | Apps | (Gls) |
| 2012–2014 | Apolonia | 46 | (9) |
| 2014 | Tomori | 12 | (1) |
| 2015 | Butrinti | 14 | (1) |
| 2015 | Bylis | 16 | (2) |
| 2016 | Tirana | 12 | (1) |
| 2016 | Tirana B | 6 | (1) |
| 2017 | Teuta | 8 | (1) |
| 2017–2018 | Lushnja | 34 | (1) |
| 2018–2022 | Botoșani | 124 | (11) |
| 2022–2023 | Çaykur Rizespor | 13 | (1) |
| 2023 | → Sepsi OSK (loan) | 16 | (0) |
| 2024 | Laçi | 16 | (1) |
| 2025– | Botoșani | 54 | (2) |
- * Club domestic league appearances and goals as of 1 November 2026

Enriko Papa (born 12 March 1993) is an Albanian professional footballer who plays as a central midfielder for Liga I club Botoșani.

== Club career ==
On 25 July 2015, Papa completed a transfer to Bylis by penning a two-year contract. He was given squad number 63, and during the first part of 2015–16 season he played 16 matches and scored two goals before leaving in January 2016.

On 1 February 2016, Papa joined fellow Kategoria Superiore side Tirana for an undisclosed fee. He signed a one-year contract with the option of a further one year.

On 8 January 2017, Papa joined Teuta by signing until the end of 2016–17 season. He made his debut on the same day in a friendly against Besa, scoring his team's first goal in an eventual 3–1 away win. Papa left the club on 18 July 2017.

On 8 September 2017, Papa joined newly promoted side Lushnja. In the 2017–18 season, Papa played 37 games between league and cup, scoring only once, as Lushnja was relegated back to Kategoria e Parë after only one year and was kicked-out in second round in Albanian Cup.

On 27 June 2018, Papa moved for the first time abroad by signing a one-year contract with an option of renew for the Romanian side Botoșani. He was presented two days later where he joined the team on training.

== Career statistics ==
As of 1 November 2026

Appearances and goals by club, season and competition
| Club | Season | League | | | National cup (Note: Includes Albanian Cup, Cupa României, Turkish Cup) | | Europe | | Other | | Total | |
| Club | Season | Division | Apps | Goals | Apps | Goals | Apps | Goals | Apps | Goals | Apps | Goals |
|---|---|---|---|---|---|---|---|---|---|---|---|---|
| Apolonia | 2012–13 | Kategoria Superiore | 16 | 1 | 3 | 0 | — | | — | | 19 | 1 |
| Apolonia | 2013–14 | Kategoria e Parë | 30 | 8 | 4 | 1 | — | | — | | 34 | 9 |
| Apolonia | Total | | 46 | 9 | 7 | 1 | — | | — | | 53 | 10 |
| Tomori | 2014–15 | Kategoria e Parë | 12 | 1 | 0 | 0 | — | | — | | 12 | 1 |
| Butrinti | 2014–15 | Kategoria e Parë | 14 | 1 | — | | — | | — | | 14 | 1 |
| Bylis | 2015–16 | Kategoria Superiore | 16 | 2 | 2 | 0 | — | | — | | 18 | 2 |
| Tirana | 2015–16 | Kategoria Superiore | 12 | 1 | 1 | 0 | — | | — | | 13 | 1 |
| Tirana B | 2016–17 | Kategoria e Dytë | 6 | 1 | — | | — | | — | | 6 | 1 |
| Teuta | 2016–17 | Kategoria Superiore | 8 | 1 | 1 | 0 | — | | — | | 9 | 1 |
| Lushnja | 2017–18 | Kategoria Superiore | 34 | 1 | 3 | 0 | — | | — | | 37 | 1 |
| Botoșani | 2018–19 | Liga I | 33 | 1 | 1 | 0 | — | | — | | 34 | 1 |
| Botoșani | 2019–20 | Liga I | 31 | 2 | 1 | 0 | — | | — | | 32 | 2 |
| Botoșani | 2020–21 | Liga I | 26 | 4 | 2 | 0 | 0 | 0 | — | | 28 | 4 |
| Botoșani | 2021–22 | Liga I | 34 | 4 | 0 | 0 | — | | 1 (Note: Appearances in Liga I European play-offs) | 0 | 35 | 4 |
| Botoșani | Total | | 124 | 11 | 4 | 0 | 0 | 0 | 1 | 0 | 129 | 11 |
| Çaykur Rizespor | 2022–23 | TFF 1. Lig | 13 | 1 | 4 | 0 | — | | — | | 17 | 1 |
| Sepsi OSK (loan) | 2022–23 | Liga I | 16 | 0 | 2 | 0 | — | | — | | 18 | 0 |
| Laçi | 2024–25 | Kategoria Superiore | 16 | 1 | 0 | 0 | — | | — | | 16 | 1 |
| Botoșani | 2024–25 | Liga I | 17 | 1 | — | | — | | — | | 17 | 1 |
| Botoșani | 2025–26 | Liga I | 25 | 1 | 2 | 0 | — | | 1 | 0 | 28 | 1 |
| Botoșani | 2026–27 | Liga I | 12 | 0 | 2 | 1 | — | | — | | 14 | 1 |
| Botoșani | Total | | 54 | 2 | 4 | 1 | — | | 1 | 0 | 59 | 3 |
| Career total | | | 371 | 32 | 28 | 2 | 0 | 0 | 2 | 0 | 401 | 34 |

== Honours ==
Sepsi OSK

- Cupa României: 2022–23
