= Fabio Gjonikaj =

Albanian footballer

Personal information
- Date of birth: 25 May 1995 (age 31)
- Place of birth: Pukë, Albania
- Height: 1.85 m (6 ft 1 in)
- Position: Goalkeeper

Team information
- Current team: Vushtrria
- Number: 1

Youth career
- 2008–2011: Partizani Tirana
- 2011–2012: Dinamo Tirana

Senior career*
| Years | Team | Apps | (Gls) |
| 2011–2013 | Dinamo Tirana | 3 | (0) |
| 2013–2018 | Partizani | 5 | (0) |
| 2015–2018 | → Kamza (loan) | 61 | (0) |
| 2018– | Vushtrria | | |

International career
| 2011–2012 | Albania U-17 | 2 | (0) |
| 2012–2013 | Albania U-19 | 1 | (0) |
- * Club domestic league appearances and goals as of 6 April 2019

Fabio Gjonikaj (born 25 May 1995) is an Albanian football goalkeeper who plays for Kosovan side Vushtrria.

== Club career ==
He spent several years on loan at Kamza from Partizani Tirana.
