= Gëzim Hyska =

Albanian footballer

Personal information
- Date of birth: 21 July 1995 (age 31)
- Place of birth: Fier, Albania
- Height: 1.75 m (5 ft 9 in)
- Position: Forward

Youth career
- 2011–2012: Tole Alba
- 2012–2014: Apolonia

Senior career*
Years	Team	Apps	(Gls)
2014–2019	Bylis	14	(3)
2014	→ Himara (loan)	10	(3)
2015–2016	→ Naftëtari (loan)		
2017	→ Dinamo Tirana (loan)	8	(1)
2017–2018	→ Albpetrol		
2019	BV Essen	3	(0)
2020	Burreli	13	(3)
2020–2021	Oriku	5	(0)
2021	Erzeni	14	(4)
2021–2022	Butrinti	29	(5)
2022–2023	Turbina Cërrik	11	(0)
2023	AF Elbasani		
2023–2024	Shkumbini		
- * Club domestic league appearances and goals as of 21 December 2022

Gëzim Hyska (born 21 July 1995) is an Albanian professional footballer who plays as a forward.
