= Petro Ruci Stadium =

Multi-use stadium in Orikum, Albania

- Interactive map of Petro Ruci Stadium
- Former names: Fusha Sportive Orikum
- Location: Orikum, Albania
- Coordinates: 40°6′10.6″N 19°44′25.7″E
- Owner: KF Oriku
- Capacity: 2,000
- Surface: Grass

Construction
- Renovated: 2012

Tenant
- KF Oriku

Petro Ruci Stadium is a multi-use stadium in Orikum, Albania. The stadium has a capacity of 2,000 people and it is mostly used for football matches and it is the home ground of KF Oriku.
