= Arbër Allkanjari =

Albanian footballer

Arben Allkanjari
Personal information
- Full name: Arben Allkanjari
- Date of birth: 20 November 1989 (age 36)
- Place of birth: Lushnje, Albania
- Position: Striker

Youth career
- 2006–2008: Egnatia

Senior career*
Years	Team	Apps	(Gls)
2008–2009	Egnatia	20	(5)
2009–2013	Lushnja	30	(2)
2013–2014	Dinamo Tirana	14	(1)
2014–2017	Lushnja	51	(3)
- * Club domestic league appearances and goals as of 17 February 2016

Arben Allkanjari lkanjari (born 20 November 1989) is an Albanian football player who plays as a striker. He formerly played for Lushnja.

== Club career ==
=== Lushnja ===
On 24 October 2015, Allkanjari scored his first league goal of the season as well as the lone goal against Pogradeci, giving his team three important points. On 16 July 2017, after collecting 58 appearances and scoring 6 goals, Allkanjari left Lushnja after his contract expired, becoming a free agent in the process.

=== FK Dinamo Tirana ===
Arbër Allkanjar was playing for Arbër FK Dinamo Tirana from 01/2013 – 08/2014
