= Kastrioti Stadium =

- Stadiumi Kastrioti
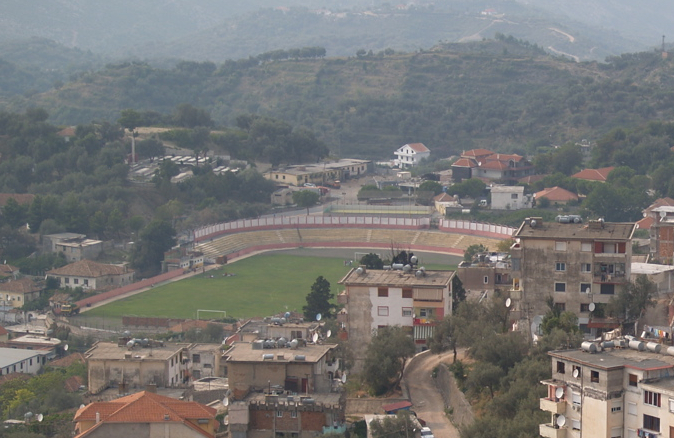
- The Kastrioti Stadium in 2005
- Interactive map of Kastrioti Stadium
- Address: Rruga Kryesore
- Location: Krujë, Albania
- Coordinates: 41°30′43.60″N 19°47′12.22″E
- Owner: Municipality of Krujë
- Capacity: 8,400
- Surface: Natural grass
- Scoreboard: No

Construction
- Opened: 1949
- Renovated: 2008
- Closed: March 7, 2020
- Demolished: March 7, 2020
- Years active: 1949-2020

Tenant
- Kastrioti Krujë (1949-2020)

Kastrioti Stadium (Albanian: Stadiumi Kastrioti) was a multi-use stadium in Krujë, Albania. It was used mostly for football matches and was the home ground of Kastrioti Krujë.
