= Maringlen Shoshi =

Albanian professional footballer (born 1987)

Personal information
- Full name: Maringlen Shoshi
- Date of birth: 29 January 1987 (age 39)
- Place of birth: Fier, Albania
- Height: 1.87 m (6 ft 2 in)
- Position: Defender

Team information
- Current team: Ferizaj

Youth career
- 2000–2005: Apolonia Fier

Senior career*
Years	Team	Apps	(Gls)
2005–2010	Apolonia Fier	80	(3)
2010–2016	Bylis Ballsh	107	(10)
2016–2017	Tre Fiori	11	(0)
2017–2018	Bylis Ballsh	32	(7)
2018–2019	Trepça'89	12	(1)
2019–	Ferizaj	12	(0)

International career
2006–2008	Albania U21	5	(1)
- * Club domestic league appearances and goals as of 18:28, 15 May 2019 (UTC)

Maringlen Shoshi (born 29 January 1987) is an Albanian professional footballer who plays as a defender for KF Ferizaj in the Football Superleague of Kosovo.

== Club career ==
=== Early career ===
In the summer of 2008, Shoshi was loaned out to Besa Kavajë for their matches against Grasshopper Club Zürich in the 2008 UEFA Intertoto Cup.

=== Bylis Ballsh ===
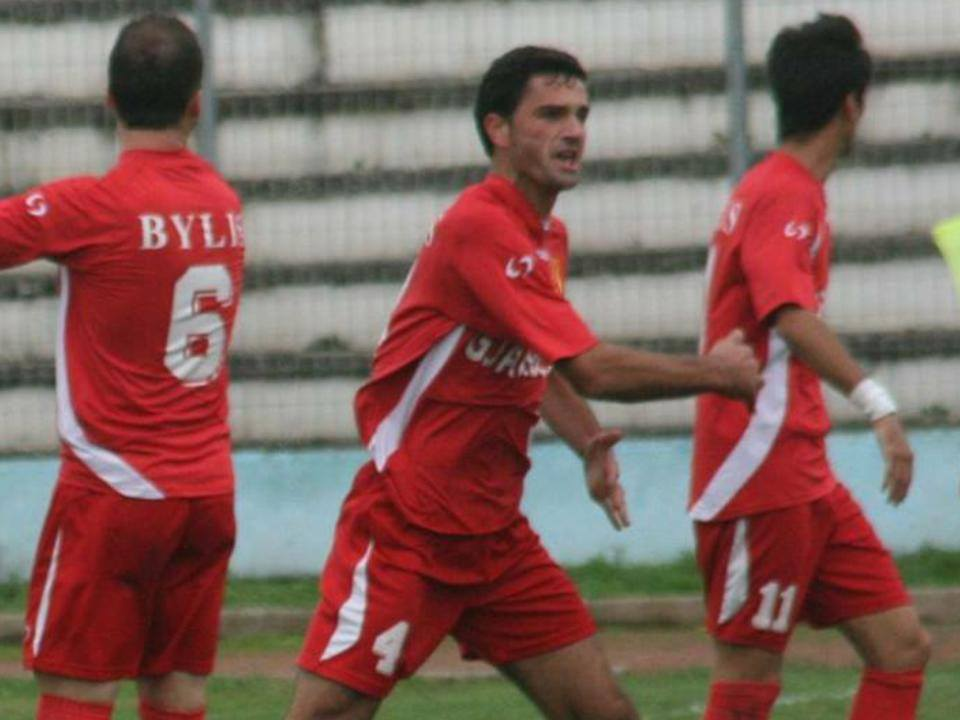
Shoshi (left), celebrating the goal of Bruno Kepi (center) during a league match.

In the summer of 2010, Shoshi completed a transfer to fellow top flight side Bylis Ballsh. He made his competitive debut on 12 September in the 2010–11 Albanian Superliga matchday 3 against Tirana as Bylis Ballsh was defeated 1–2. Shoshi opened his scoring account later on 26 February by netting the temporary equalizer in an eventual 4–2 away loss at the hands of Shkumbini Peqin. He added two more in his account, and finished the season with 29 league appearances, all of them as starter, collecting 2566 minutes, being the most used player of the team. Bylis finished the championship at 6th place, avoiding the relegation play-off for only one point. He also played two cup matches, as Bylis was eliminated by eventual winners Tirana in the quarter-finals.

On 8 August 2015, Shoshi signed a new one-year contract with the club, prolonging his Bylis career up to six seasons. Twenty-two days later, he was sent-off during the league encounter versus Tërbuni Pukë after a brawl with Tushaj. It was his first red card in three years and Bylis lost 0–2. Later in December 2015, he was banned for six months by Albanian Football Association for plotting the match result of Bylis–Tërbuni match on 18 November. Therefore, he finished 2015–16 season by making only 11 league appearances, in addition 3 cup matches.

=== Tre Fiori ===
In September 2016, Shoshi moved for the first time aboard, signing a contract with San Marino outfit Tre Fiori.

=== Bylis Ballsh return ===
On 12 January 2017, Bylis Ballsh announced to have signed Shoshi, bringing him back after half a season. He was given his old squad number 6 and captaincy, and made his second debut by starting in the 2–1 win at Elbasani, netting the opener with a penalty at 11th minute. Shoshi went on to appear in the next 7 matches as Bylis missed out promotion to top flight to Lushnja for only three points.

Shoshi extended his contract with the club for another season. He scored his first goal of the season on 23 September by netting the third of the 3–1 home win over Shënkolli.

=== Trepça'89 ===
In June 2018, Shoshi completed a transfer to Kosovar side Trepça'89 by inking a one-year contract. He made his competitive debut on 18 August, captaining his side in the opening match of the season, a 1–1 draw against Feronikeli.

=== KF Ferizaj ===
In February 2019, Shoshi joined KF Ferizaj.

== International career ==
Shoshi was called up for the first time at Albania senior squad by manager Josip Kuže in October 2009 for the last qualifying match against Sweden. Prior to the match, Shoshi played in two unofficial friendlies against 08 Hasloh and SpVgg Greuther Fürth. However, he didn't play in the last match against Sweden as Albania lost 4–1 at Råsunda Stadium.

== Honours ==
Bylis Ballsh

- Albanian First Division: 2014–15
