= Flamur Tairi =

Albanian footballer

Personal information
- Full name: Flamur Tairi; Фљамур Таири
- Date of birth: 24 November 1990 (age 35)
- Place of birth: Struga, SR Macedonia, SFR Yugoslavia
- Height: 1.73 m (5 ft 8 in)
- Position: Midfielder

Team information
- Current team: FC Struga
- Number: 8

Youth career
- –2004: Dollogozdha
- 2004–2007: Karaorman

Senior career*
Years	Team	Apps	(Gls)
2007–2009	Makedonija		
2009–2010	Napredok		
2010	Vëllazërimi		
2010–2013	Teuta	71	(6)
2013	Gostivar	18	(1)
2014	Renova	20	(0)
2015	Gostivar		
2015–2016	Bylis	12	(0)
2017–	Struga	107	(2)

International career^{‡}
2008–2012	Macedonia U-21	14	(0)
- * Club domestic league appearances and goals as of 1 June 2025 ‡ National team caps and goals as of 15 May 2015

Flamur Tairi (Macedonian: Фљамур Таири, romanized: Fljamur Tairi; born 24 November 1990) is a Macedonian footballer who currently plays for FC Struga.

== International career ==
Tairi has been a member of the Macedonian U-21 team since 2008, and made his debut in the U21 on 9 September in the 0–0 draw against Norway. He could also have chosen to represent Albania because he is an ethnic Albanian.

== Honours ==
FC Struga Trim–Lum

- Macedonian Second Football League: 2017–18,
- Macedonian First Football League : 2022–23, 2023–24
