= Adush Muça Stadium =

Multi-use stadium in Ballsh, Albania

- Interactive map of Adush Muça Stadium
- Location: Ballsh, Albania
- Coordinates: 40°36′7″N 19°44′27″E
- Owner: Bylis
- Capacity: 2,464
- Surface: Grass

Construction
- Renovated: 2012

Tenant
- Bylis

Adush Muça Stadium (Albanian: Stadiumi Adush Muça) is a multi-use stadium in Ballsh, Albania. It is currently used mostly for football matches and is the home ground of Bylis. The stadium has a capacity of 2,464 people.

== Renovation ==
In 2012, with the backing of the club's owners, the Albanian Football Association and the MTKRS, the stadium was renovated. A new pitch was laid and the ground's facilities were modernised as well 3,000 plastic seats being installed in the stands. Work on the stadium was completed in September 2012 and Bylis Ballsh's first game at the ground was a 2-0 Albanian Cup win over Tërbuni.
