= Bekim Kuli =

Albanian retired footballer (born 1982)

Personal information
- Full name: Bekim Kuli
- Date of birth: 19 September 1982 (age 44)
- Place of birth: Kavajë, Albania
- Height: 1.81 m (5 ft 11 in)
- Position: Forward

Youth career
- 1996–1998: Tropikal Durrës
- 1998–1999: Besa Kavajë
- 1999–2000: Gençlerbirliği
- Samsunspor

Senior career*
| Years | Team | Apps | (Gls) |
| 1998–1999 | Besa | | |
| 1999–2000 | Gençlerbirliği | 10 | (7) |
| 1999–2000 | → Gençlerbirliği A2 (loan) | 25 | (15) |
| 2000–2004 | Samsunspor | 31 | (28) |
| 2000–2001 | → Samsunspor A2 (loan) | 22 | (11) |
| 2002 | → Partizani (loan) | 11 | (1) |
| 2002 | → Samsunspor A2 (loan) | 11 | (7) |
| 2003 | → Partizani (loan) | 8 | (0) |
| 2003–2004 | → Besa (loan) | 25 | (8) |
| 2004 | Egnatia | 16 | (4) |
| 2005 | Lushnja | 15 | (2) |
| 2005 | Vllaznia | 7 | (0) |
| 2006 | Lushnja | 15 | (3) |
| 2006–2007 | Teuta | 28 | (4) |
| 2007–2008 | Dinamo Tirana | 28 | (7) |
| 2008–2009 | Besa | 26 | (4) |
| 2009–2010 | Dinamo Tirana | 23 | (3) |
| 2010–2011 | Shkumbini | 27 | (9) |
| 2011–2012 | Dinamo Tirana | 20 | (5) |
| 2012–2013 | Skënderbeu | 14 | (0) |
| 2013–2014 | Bylis | 22 | (5) |
| 2014 | Besa | 9 | (3) |
| 2015 | Teuta | 11 | (0) |
| 2015 | Bylis | 5 | (0) |
| 2016 | Lushnja | | |

International career
| 1999 | Albania U16 | 2 | (2) |
| 2000 | Albania U18 | 3 | (2) |
| 2001–2003 | Albania U21 | 4 | (0) |

Managerial career
- 2016: Besa
- 2017: Sopoti
- * Club domestic league appearances and goals as of 30 January 2016

Bekim Kuli (born 19 September 1982 in Kavajë) is an Albanian retired footballer who has played for several teams in the Albanian Superliga.

== Club career ==
=== Early career ===
Kuli began his career with the Tropikal Durrës youth team, where he played for two years before joining his hometown club Besa Kavajë in 1998. He was with the club for only a year before moving to Turkey to join Gençlerbirliği in the summer of 1999 along with fellow Albanian Bledar Mançaku. The pair both joined the club's youth team, and Kuli featured in two under-21 A2 Ligi games in his first season in Turkey, and he was part of the team that finished as runners-up in the 1999–2000 A2 Ligi. He was then transferred to Samsunspor in 2000 and again joined the club's under-21 side where he became an important player, scoring 11 goals in 22 games to once again finish as a runner-up in the A2 Ligi. He made his professional debut as a 19-year-old with Samsunspor on 12 December 2001 in a Turkish Cup game against Trabzonspor, where he came on as an 80th-minute substitute for Alfred Phiri in the 3–0 away loss.

He returned to Albania in January 2002 where he loaned out to Albanian Superliga side Partizani Tirana for the remainder of the 2001–2002 campaign in order to gain first team experience. He played 11 league games while he was on loan and he scored on goal which came on 30 March in a 2–1 loss to Shkumbini Peqin. Upon his return to Samsunspor, he went back to the under-21 side, and scored 7 goals in 11 games in the first half of the season before being sent out once again on loan to Partizani Tirana where he didn't score in 8 league appearances, but he did manage to find the net in the Albanian Cup against Bylis Ballsh.

He remained in the Albanian Superliga the following season as he joined his hometown club Besa Kavajë on a season long loan, where he scored 8 league goals in 25 league games, as well as a further 4 Albanian Cup goals to take his tally to 12 for the season. However, his goals could not save his side from being relegated after a disappointing season that saw them second to bottom and 12 points away from safety. They were also knocked out of the Albanian Cup by KF Tirana in the quarter-finals.

On 31 August 2014, Kuli returned to Besa Kavajë for the third time in his career. He made his debut in Albanian First Division for 2014–15 season on 27 September 2014, playing full 90 minutes in a 1–1 draw against Tërbuni Pukë. Later, on 22 October, he scored first goals of the season, helping the team to get a 2–2 draw against Veleçiku Koplik. He scored another twice, his time in a 3–2 win against Ada Velipojë on 29 November.

He left Besa Kavajë on 5 January 2015 as he had agreed terms to rejoin Teuta Durrës in the Albanian Superliga. He made his second debut for the club on 24 January 2015 in a league game against Flamurtari Vlorë, playing the first 63 minutes of the game before being substituted off for Ardit Peposhi in the 2–1 away loss.

During the summer of 2015, Kuli was repurchased from Bylis Ballsh of Albanian Superliga, signing a one-year deal and taking the vacant number 18 for 2015–16 season.

== Honours ==
Dinamo Tirana

- Albanian Superliga (1): 2009–10

Skënderbeu

- Albanian Superliga (1): 2012–13
