= Mikel Kaloshi =

Albanian footballer

Personal information
- Date of birth: 16 June 1993 (age 33)
- Place of birth: Lushnjë, Albania
- Height: 1.88 m (6 ft 2 in)
- Position: Goalkeeper

Youth career
- Lushnja

Senior career*
Years	Team	Apps	(Gls)
2010–2012	Lushnja	3	(0)
2013–2015	Bylis	28	(0)
2013	→ Gramshi (loan)	7	(0)
2013	→ Albpetrol (loan)	13	(0)
2014	→ Tomori (loan)	12	(0)
2015	→ Shkumbini (loan)	2	(0)
2016-2019	Tomori	60	(0)
2019-2021	Drenica	2	(0)
2021	Tomori	3	(0)
2021	Drenica	6	(0)
2022–2023	Lushnja	40	(0)
2023–2024	Besa Kavajë	16	(0)

International career
2011	Albania U17	1	(0)
2011–2012	Albania U19	3	(0)
- * Club domestic league appearances and goals as of 16 December 2023

Mikel Kaloshi (born 16 June 1993) is an Albanian professional footballer.
