= Silvester Shkalla =

Albanian footballer

Personal information
- Date of birth: 10 August 1995 (age 31)
- Place of birth: Tirana, Albania
- Height: 1.91 m (6 ft 3 in)
- Position: Centre-back

Youth career
- –2014: Shkëndija Tiranë

Senior career*
Years	Team	Apps	(Gls)
2014–2015	Dinamo Tirana	26	(1)
2015–2019	Teuta Durrës	107	(3)
2020	Bylis	16	(0)
2020–2021	Kastrioti Krujë	28	(1)
2021–2022	Ulpiana	31	(2)
2022–2023	Flamurtari	15	(1)

International career
2016	Albania U21	4	(0)
- * Club domestic league appearances and goals as of 18:28, 26 December 2023 (UTC)

Silvester Shkalla (born 10 August 1995) is an Albanian professional footballer who plays as a centre-back.

== Club career ==
=== Early career ===
Shkalla started his youth career at Shkëndija Tiranë. After spending 3 years there he moved at Dinamo Tirana.

=== Teuta Durrës ===
In July 2015, Shkalla signed a three-year contract with Albanian Superliga side Teuta Durrës for an undisclosed fee. He was given the number 3, which was vacant after the departure of Elvis Prençi.

Shkalla made his top flight debut on 22 August 2015 in team's opening match of the season against Flamurtari Vlorë, where he played full-90 minutes in a 1–0 away triumph. He played full-90 minutes in both legs of the first round of 2015–16 Albanian Cup, where Teuta thrashed Ada Velipojë with the aggregate 11–2.

On 21 October, in the first round of the second leg against Kamza, Shkalla scored his first goal for Teuta, a winner, which helped the team to win the match 0–1. After the match, he told the media that he has very happy for the goal and more happy for the fact that the team won thanks to his goal.

== International career ==
=== Albania U-21 ===
==== 2017 UEFA Euro U-21 Championship ====
Shkalla was called up at the Albania national under-21 football team by coach Redi Jupi during the 2017 UEFA European Under-21 Championship qualification between October and November 2015 where he was an unused substitute in 3 matches played by Albania U21. After almost 1-year absence he was returned again at Albania U21 and played as a starter in a match against Greece U21 on 2 September 2016. In the 41st minute Shkalla made a bad tackle against an opponent player and this caused to receive a Yellow card and then following a controversial physical attack directed to him by opponent's players, referee gave Shkalla a Red card to send him off.

== Career statistics ==
=== Clubs ===
As of 16:07, 29 May 2017 (UTC)

Club	Season	League country	League		League Cup		Europe (Note: Including European competitions, such as UEFA Champions League and UEFA Europa League)		Other (Note: Including other competitions, such as Albanian Supercup)		Total	
Club	Season	League country	Apps	Goals	Apps	Goals	Apps	Goals	Apps	Goals	Apps	Goals
Dinamo Tirana	2014–15	Albanian First Division	26	1	1	0	—		—		27	1
Dinamo Tirana	Total		26	1	1	0	—		—		27	1
Teuta Durrës	2015–16	Albanian Superliga	28	1	6	1	—		—		34	2
Teuta Durrës	2016–17	Albanian Superliga	24	0	3	0	2	0	—		29	0
Teuta Durrës	Total		52	1	9	1	2	0	—		63	2
Career total			78	2	10	1	2	0	0	0	90	3
