= Stipe Buljan =

Croatian footballer

Personal information
- Full name: Stipe Buljan
- Date of birth: 21 September 1983 (age 43)
- Place of birth: Našice, SR Croatia, SFR Yugoslavia (now Croatia)
- Height: 1.90 m (6 ft 3 in)
- Position: Defender

Senior career*
Years	Team	Apps	(Gls)
2003–2004	NK Virovitica	22	(0)
2004–2006	NK Papuk Orahovica	32	(9)
2006–2007	Osijek	15	(1)
2007	NK Zagreb	0	(0)
2008–2010	Suhopolje	65	(12)
2010–2016	Laçi	167	(8)
- * Club domestic league appearances and goals as of 6 October 2015

Stipe Buljan (born 21 September 1983 in Našice) is a former Croatian football player who last played for KF Laçi in the Albanian Superliga.

== Club career ==
In six years at Laçi, Buljan has made 167 league appearances and won two Albanian Cup trophies and one Albanian Supercup trophy.

== Honours ==
KF Laçi

- Albanian Cup (2): 2012–13, 2014–15
- Albanian Supercup (1) : 2015
