= Qemal Mustafaraj =

Albanian footballer

Personal information
- Full name: Qemal Mustafaraj
- Date of birth: 1 July 1995 (age 31)
- Place of birth: Fier, Albania
- Position: Forward

Senior career*
Years	Team	Apps	(Gls)
2013–2016	Bylis	26	(6)
2017	Apolonia	6	(1)
- * Club domestic league appearances and goals

Qemal Mustafaraj (born 1 July 1995 in Fier) is an Albanian professional footballer who most recently played for Apolonia Fier in the Albanian First Division.

== Club career ==
Mustafaraj left Apolonia in summer 2017 after only joining them earlier in that year from Bylis Ballsh.
