= Emmanuel Mbella =

Cameroonian footballer (born 1992)

Personal information
- Full name: Emmanuel Mbella
- Date of birth: 18 June 1992 (age 34)
- Place of birth: Edéa, Cameroon
- Height: 1.78 m (5 ft 10 in)
- Position: Winger

Youth career
- Les Mureaux
- –2012: Monza

Senior career*
Years	Team	Apps	(Gls)
2012	Gloria Buzau	8	(2)
2012–2014	Pandurii Târgu Jiu		
2012–2013	→ Botoșani (loan)	11	(2)
2013–2014	→ Academica Clinceni (loan)	14	(0)
2014–2015	SVN Zweibrücken	15	(1)
2015–2017	Bylis Ballsh	33	(3)
2017–2018	Shkupi	28	(5)
2018	Gjilani	6	(0)
2018	Sileks	16	(1)
2019	Renova	18	(2)
2019–2020	Ermis Aradippou	9	(2)
Medal record
Botoșani
Winner	Liga II	2012–13
- * Club domestic league appearances and goals as of 22:40, 21 May 2020 (UTC)

Emmanuel Mbella (born 18 June 1992) is a Cameroonian professional footballer who plays as a winger for Macedonian club FK Renova.

== Club career ==
=== Bylis Ballsh ===
On 9 August 2015. Mbella joined Albanian Superliga side Bylis Ballsh. On 30 August 2015, he making his debut in a 0–2 home defeat against Tërbuni Pukë after being named in the starting line-up.

=== Shkupi ===
On 23 March 2017, FIFA gives permission Mbella to play for Macedonian First Football League side Shkupi. On 2 April 2017, he making his debut in a 1–0 home win against Pelister after being named in the starting line-up.

=== Gjilani ===
On 26 January 2018, Mbella joined Football Superleague of Kosovo side Gjilani.

=== Sileks ===
On 7 June 2018, after just 5 months spent at Gjilani, Mbella returned to Macedonian Superleague and joined Sileks.

=== Ermis Aradippou ===
In June 2019, Mbella moved to Cyprus to join Ermis Aradippou FC. He signed a one-year deal.
