= Xhelil Asani =

Albanian footballer (born 1995)

Personal information
- Date of birth: 12 September 1995 (age 31)
- Place of birth: Kičevo, Macedonia
- Height: 1.86 m (6 ft 1 in)
- Positions: Left-back; left winger

Team information
- Current team: Shkupi
- Number: 3

Youth career
- –2013: Vellazerimi 77

Senior career*
Years	Team	Apps	(Gls)
2014	Napredok	15	(2)
2015	Vëllazërimi 77	30	(6)
2015	Bylis Ballsh	14	(2)
2015–2016	Metalurg Skopje	15	(1)
2016–2017	Pembroke Athleta	14	(1)
2017	Torpedo-BelAZ Zhodino	10	(0)
2017	Shkëndija	2	(0)
2018	Mash'al Mubarek	9	(0)
2018–2019	Mladost Doboj Kakanj	28	(0)
2019	SKA-Khabarovsk	5	(0)
2020	Pittsburgh Riverhounds SC	0	(0)
2021–2022	Rudar Prijedor	16	(0)
2022–2023	Erzeni Shijak	22	(1)
2023	Vllaznia Shkodër	3	(0)
2024	Erzeni Shijak	10	(0)
2024–	Shkupi	25	(3)
- * Club domestic league appearances and goals as of 1 June 2025

Xhelil Asani (or Djelil Asani; born 12 September 1995) is a Macedonian professional footballer who plays as a left-back or left winger for Shkupi.
