= Ahmet Haliti =

Kosovar footballer (born 1988)

Personal information
- Date of birth: 29 September 1988 (age 38)
- Place of birth: Podujeva, SFR Yugoslavia
- Height: 1.88 m (6 ft 2 in)
- Position: Defender

Youth career
- Besiana

Senior career*
Years	Team	Apps	(Gls)
2009–2013	Hysi		
2014	Besa Kavajë	14	(1)
2014–2015	Prishtina	24	(1)
2015–2016	Bylis Ballsh	14	(0)
2016–2018	Feronikeli	43	(0)
2018–2020	Prishtina	36	(1)
2020–2021	Llapi	12	(0)
2022	Prishtina	0	(0)
2023	Trepça '89	8	(0)
2023–2024	Feronikeli	18	(0)

Managerial career
- 2025–2026: Vëllaznimi (assistant)
- 2026–: Dukagjini (assistant)
- * Club domestic league appearances and goals as of 15 June 2024 ‡ National team caps and goals as of 22 January 2018

Ahmet Haliti (born 29 September 1988) is a Kosovar former professional footballer who last played as a defender for Kosovan club Feronikeli.

== Club career ==
=== Besa Kavajë ===
On 18 January 2014, Haliti signed to Albanian Superliga side Besa Kavajë. On 1 February 2014, he made his debut in a 2–2 home draw against Laçi after being named in the starting line-up.

=== Bylis Ballsh ===
On 13 August 2015, Haliti signed to Albanian Superliga side Bylis Ballsh. On 23 August 2015, he made his debut in a 2–0 away defeat against Kukësi after being named in the starting line-up.

=== Feronikeli ===
On 27 May 2016, Haliti signed to Football Superleague of Kosovo side Feronikeli.

=== Return to Prishtina ===
On 28 May 2018, Haliti returned to Football Superleague of Kosovo club Prishtina after playing for Feronikeli for three years, where he signed a one-year contract with the club.

== International career ==
On 22 January 2018. Haliti received a call-up from Kosovo for the friendly match against Azerbaijan. The match however was cancelled two days later, which prolonged his debut.
