= Kushtrim Mushica =

Kosovar footballer (born 1983)

Personal information
- Date of birth: 1 May 1983 (age 43)
- Place of birth: Pristina, Kosovo, SFR Yugoslavia
- Height: 1.90 m (6 ft 3 in)
- Position: Goalkeeper

Youth career
- 1991–1998: Ramiz Sadiku
- 2000–2002: Prishtina

Senior career*
Years	Team	Apps	(Gls)
2002–2008	Prishtina		
2008–2010	Vëllaznimi		
2010–2011	Renova	18	(0)
2010–2011	Vëllaznimi		
2011–2015	Prishtina		
2015–2016	Bylis Ballsh	13	(0)
2017–2018	Flamurtari		
2019	Vushtrria		

International career
2014	Kosovo	2	(0)
- * Club domestic league appearances and goals

Kushtrim Mushica (Serbian: Kuštrim Mušica; born 1 May 1983) is a Kosovar professional footballer.

== Club career ==
=== Early career ===
Mushica was born in Pristina, Kosovo, SFR Yugoslavia. He began playing football in 1991 with local side KF Ramiz Sadiku at the age of 6. He remained at the club until the Kosovo War led him to move away to Turkey at the age of 14 to live with relatives for three months while his father and older brother remained in Prishina. He returned to his hometown once his father deemed Pristina to be reasonably safe, and soon after the NATO bombing of Yugoslavia came that ultimately ended the war. Following the end of the war, he joined FC Prishtina, the club he had supported as a child, and he was eventually promoted to the first team in 2002 at the age of just 17.

=== Senior career ===
He joined newly promoted Albanian Superliga side Bylis Ballsh on 21 August 2015 as a free agent.

In 2017, he joined KF Flamurtari.

== International career ==
He made his debut for Kosovo in a May 2014 friendly match against Turkey and earned a total of 2 caps, scoring no goals. His other international game was a May 2014 friendly against Senegal.
