= Brunild Pepa =

Albanian footballer

Personal information
- Date of birth: 22 November 1990 (age 35)
- Place of birth: Lushnjë, Albania
- Height: 1.85 m (6 ft 1 in)
- Position: Forward

Team information
- Current team: Cuoiopelli

Youth career
- 2005–2009: Lushnja

Senior career*
Years	Team	Apps	(Gls)
2009–2010	Lushnja	15	(6)
2010–2012	Teuta	49	(15)
2012–2014	Flamurtari	47	(5)
2014–2015	Teuta	9	(2)
2015–2016	Bylis	40	(15)
2016–2017	Vllaznia	16	(0)
2017–2018	Lushnja	29	(3)
2018–2019	Gjilani	9	(1)
2019–2020	Kastrioti	6	(0)
2020	Lushnja	7	(2)
2020–2022	Tomori Berat	47	(16)
2022–2023	Lushnja	25	(8)
2023–	Cuoiopelli		
- * Club domestic league appearances and goals as of 20 May 2023

Brunild Pepa (born 22 November 1990) is an Albanian professional footballer who plays as a forward for Italian amateur side Cuoiopelli.

== Club career ==
=== Teuta Durrës ===
On 24 June 2014, Pepa returned to Teuta Durrës for a second stint at the club. He player there only in the first part of 2014–15 season, recording 2 goals in 9 league matches, in addition to one cup match.

=== Vllaznia Shkodër ===
On 24 June 2016, Pepa completed a move to Vllaznia Shkodër, signing a two-year contract.

=== Gjilani ===
In July 2018, Pepa was presented alongside Ansi Nika as the newest player of Football Superleague of Kosovo side Gjilani.

=== Kastrioti Krujë ===
On 21 January 2019, Pepa returned in Albania and signed until the end of the campaign for the top flight strugglers Kastrioti Krujë.
