= Orgest Gava =

Albanian footballer

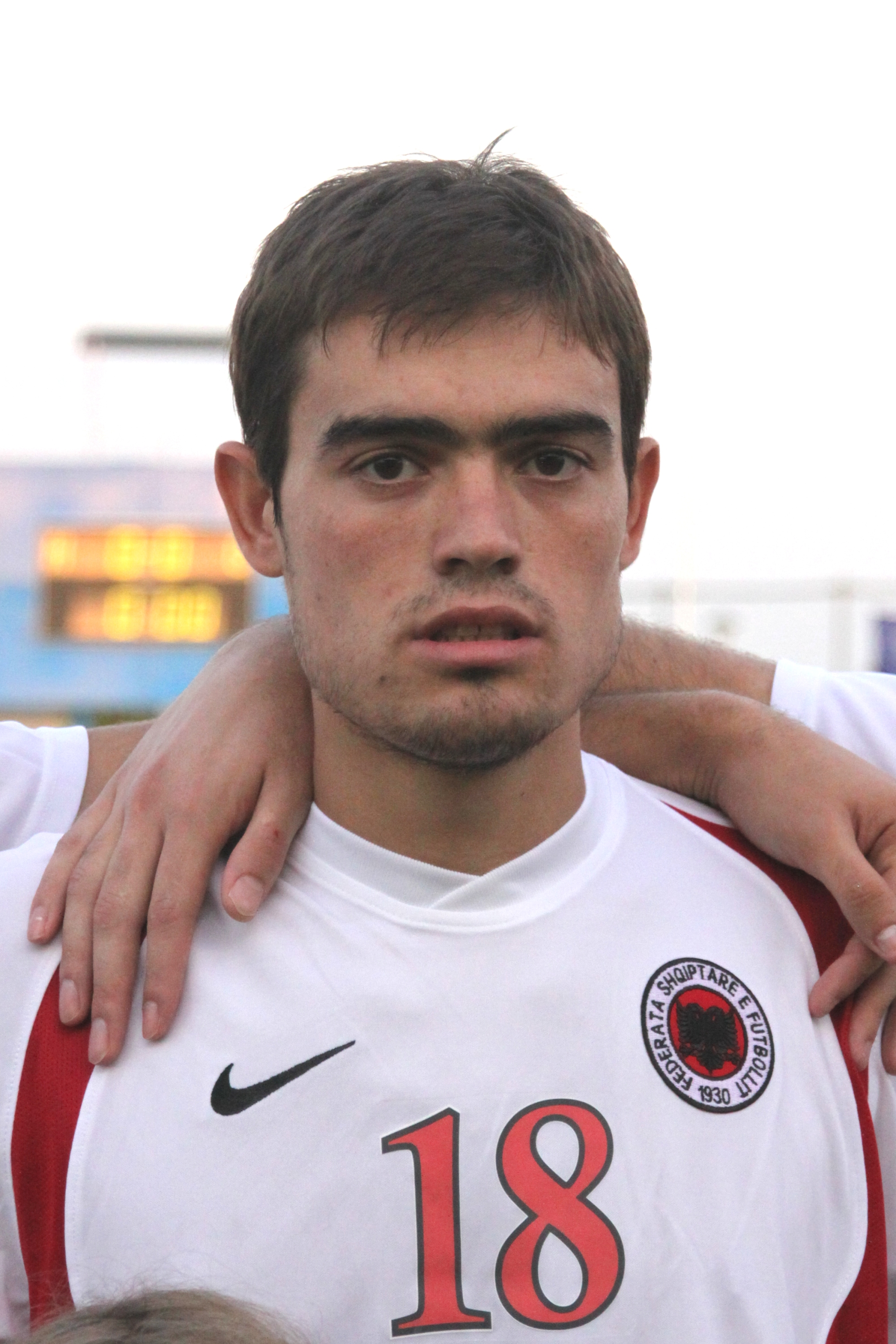
- Gava with Albania U21

Personal information
- Full name: Orgest Gava
- Date of birth: 29 March 1990 (age 36)
- Place of birth: Elbasan, Albania
- Position: Midfielder

Team information
- Current team: AF Elbasani
- Number: 10

Youth career
- –2008: KF Elbasani

Senior career*
| Years | Team | Apps | (Gls) |
| 2008–2015 | KF Elbasani | 147 | (12) |
| 2012–2013 | → Shkumbini (loan) | 8 | (0) |
| 2015–2017 | Bylis Ballsh | 58 | (5) |
| 2017–2018 | Lushnja | 32 | (1) |
| 2018–2019 | Trepça'89 | 21 | (2) |
| 2019 | Dukagjini | 14 | (0) |
| 2020 | Lushnja | 10 | (0) |
| 2020–2021 | Tomori | 18 | (0) |
| 2021– | AF Elbasani | 55 | (16) |

International career
| 2009 | Albania U20 | 6 | (0) |
| 2009–2011 | Albania U21 | 11 | (0) |
- * Club domestic league appearances and goals as of 23:26, 15 January 2020 (UTC)

Orgest Gava (born 29 March 1990) is an Albanian professional footballer who plays as a midfielder for AF Elbasani in the Kategoria superiore.

== Club career ==
=== Lushnja ===
In July 2017, Gava joined newly promoted Albanian Superliga side Lushnja by signing a one-year contract. In an interview, Gava said that he was happy to be part of Lushnja. He made his competitive debut for the team on 10 September in the opening matchday of championship against. One week later, Gava scored his maiden goal, the opener with a shot just inside the box, but Lushnja was defeated 3–1 by Flamurtari Vlorë. With Lushnja already relegated, in May 2018 Gava stated that he'll leave the club once his contract expire.
