= KF Himara =

Albanian football club

Himara
- Full name: Klubi i Futbolit Himara
- Founded: 1932; 94 years ago
- Dissolved: 2014
- Ground: Petro Ruci Stadium
- Capacity: 2,500
Home colours	Away colours

Klubi i Futbolit Himara was an Albanian football club based in the town of Himarë, formerly part of Vlorë District. The club's home ground was Petro Ruci Stadium and they last competed in the Albanian Second Division.

== History ==
Founded in 1932, they have also played under the name Vetëtima Himarë. In 2022, the club was refounded as AF Himara, and are currently playing in the Albanian Third Division.
