= Ardit Peposhi =

Albanian footballer

Personal information
- Full name: Ardit Peposhi
- Date of birth: 14 September 1993 (age 33)
- Place of birth: Kukës, Albania
- Height: 1.80 m (5 ft 11 in)
- Position: Midfielder

Team information
- Current team: Vushtrria
- Number: 25

Youth career
- 2005–2012: Partizani

Senior career*
| Years | Team | Apps | (Gls) |
| 2012–2014 | Tirana | 33 | (1) |
| 2014–2015 | Teuta | 29 | (4) |
| 2015–2016 | Bylis | 32 | (1) |
| 2016–2017 | Korabi | 29 | (0) |
| 2017–2018 | Kukësi | 11 | (0) |
| 2018–2020 | Bylis | 37 | (6) |
| 2020–2022 | Llapi | 56 | (1) |
| 2022–2024 | Erzeni | 61 | (0) |
| 2024–2025 | Teuta | 13 | (0) |
| 2025– | Vushtrria | 0 | (0) |

International career
| 2009–2010 | Albania U-17 | 3 | (0) |
| 2010–2011 | Albania U-19 | 1 | (0) |
- * Club domestic league appearances and goals as of 3 February 2025

Ardit Peposhi (born 14 September 1993) is an Albanian professional footballer who plays as a midfielder for Vushtrria.

== Club career ==
=== Partizani Tirana ===
Peposhi is a product of his capital club Partizani Tirana, where he began his career professionally in 2010 when Partizani Tirana were struggling in the Albanian First Division. His debut season was not successful as it saw his side relegated to the 3rd tier of Albanian football.

=== Tirana ===
He left the club in the summer of 2011 and joined city rivals KF Tirana in the top flight. As competition for places was fierce at the time, Peposhi found it hard to play feature and was limited to only substitute appearances and cup games.

=== Bylis Ballsh ===
On 16 July 2015, Peposhi signed a two-year contract with the nearly promoted side Bylis Ballsh, with an option to renew it for another year. He made his league debut for the club on 23 August 2015 in a 2–0 away loss to FK Kukësi. He played all ninety minutes of the match. He scored his first league goal for the club on 17 October 2015 in a 2–1 away loss to Partizani Tirana. His goal, scored in the seventh minute, made the score 1–0 to Bylis. In the 91st minute, Peposhi was shown a straight red card.

=== Kukësi ===
On 14 August 2017, Peposhi signed with his hometown club Kukësi by agreeing a one-year contract with an option of a further one. He was presented alongside Rauf Aliyev, stating: "I'm very happy to be part of my hometown team." He made his league debut for the club on 25 November 2017 in a 1–0 away victory over KF Laçi. He was subbed on for Rauf Aliyev in the 72nd minute.

== Career statistics ==
As of 28 September 2015

| Club | Season | League | | Cup | | Continental | | Other (Note: Including other competitions, such Albanian Supercup) | | Total | |
| Club | Season | Apps | Goals | Apps | Goals | Apps | Goals | Apps | Goals | Apps | Goals |
|---|---|---|---|---|---|---|---|---|---|---|---|
| Partizani Tirana | 2010–11 | 1 | 0 | — | | — | | — | | 1 | 0 |
| Partizani Tirana | Total | 1 | 0 | 0 | 0 | 0 | 0 | 0 | 0 | 1 | 0 |
| KF Tirana | 2011–12 | 3 | 0 | 6 | 0 | — | | — | | 9 | 0 |
| KF Tirana | 2012–13 | 14 | 0 | 1 | 0 | 1 | 0 | 1 | 0 | 17 | 0 |
| KF Tirana | 2013–14 | 16 | 1 | 2 | 0 | — | | — | | 18 | 1 |
| KF Tirana | Total | 33 | 1 | 9 | 0 | 1 | 0 | 1 | 0 | 44 | 1 |
| Teuta Durrës | 2014–15 | 29 | 4 | 2 | 0 | — | | — | | 31 | 4 |
| Teuta Durrës | Total | 29 | 4 | 2 | 0 | 0 | 0 | 0 | 0 | 31 | 4 |
| Bylis Ballsh | 2015–16 | 5 | 0 | 1 | 0 | — | | — | | 6 | 0 |
| Bylis Ballsh | Total | 5 | 0 | 1 | 0 | 0 | 0 | 0 | 0 | 6 | 0 |
| Total career | | 68 | 1 | 12 | 0 | 1 | 0 | 1 | 0 | 82 | 5 |

== Honours ==
Tirana

- Albanian Cup: 2011–12
- Albanian Supercup: 2012
