= 2016–17 FK Kukësi season =

Kukësi
2016–17 season
- Chairman: Safet Gjici
- Manager: Ernest Gjoka
- Stadium: Zeqir Ymeri Stadium
- Kategoria Superiore: Winners
- Albanian Cup: Quarter-finals
- Albanian Supercup: Winners
- Europa League: Second qualifying round
Home colours	Away colours

This article covers the 2016–17 season for Kukësi. They'll participate in the Kategoria Superiore, Albanian Supercup and the Albanian Cup. The club also started the season in the UEFA Europa League but were eliminated in the second qualifying round by Austrian club Austria Wien.

== Squad ==
=== First team squad ===
As of 9 August 2016.

Note: Flags indicate national team as defined under FIFA eligibility rules; some limited exceptions apply. Players may hold more than one non-FIFA nationality.

No.	Pos.	Nation	Player
1	GK	ALB	Enea Koliqi
2	DF	ALB	Resul Kastrati
3	DF	ALB	Albi Alla
4	DF	ALB	Ylli Shameti
5	DF	ALB	Rexhep Memini
8	FW	MKD	Izair Emini
9	FW	ALB	Sindri Guri
10	FW	BRA	Jean Carioca
11	MF	ALB	Bekim Dema
12	GK	ALB	Ervis Koçi
13	DF	ALB	Rrahman Hallaçi (Captain)
15	FW	BRA	Felipe Moreira
16	MF	ALB	Edon Hasani

No.	Pos.	Nation	Player
17	MF	ALB	Eni Imami
19	FW	BRA	Rangel
20	MF	ALB	Fjoart Jonuzi
21	FW	CRO	Matija Dvorneković
22	MF	ALB	Bedri Greca
23	MF	ALB	Besar Musolli
–	GK	ALB	Aldo Teqja
–	DF	ALB	Entonio Pashaj
–	DF	ALB	Polizoi Arbëri
–	MF	ALB	Nijaz Lena
–	FW	CRO	Pero Pejić
–	FW	BRA	Wéverton

== Transfers ==
=== In ===
Date	Pos.	Name	From	Fee
1 July 2016	MF	(Montenegro) Marko Šćepanović	(Montenegro) Mladost Podgorica	Undisclosed
1 July 2016	DF	(Albania) Polizoi Arbëri	(Albania) Vllaznia Shkodër	Undisclosed
29 July 2016	GK	(Albania) Aldo Teqja	(Cyprus) Anorthosis Famagusta	Undisclosed
30 July 2016	FW	(Croatia) Pero Pejić	(Iran) Esteghlal	Undisclosed
2 August 2016	DF	(Albania) Entonio Pashaj	(Albania) Flamurtari Vlorë	Undisclosed
3 August 2016	MF	(Albania) Nijaz Lena	(Albania) Teuta Durrës	Undisclosed

=== Loan in ===
Date from	Date to	Pos.	Name	From
9 July 2016	21 July 2016	MF	(Albania) Liridon Latifi	(Albania) Skënderbeu Korçë
9 July 2016	21 July 2016	MF	(Albania) Sabien Lilaj	(Albania) Skënderbeu Korçë

=== Out ===
Date	Pos.	Name	To	Fee
1 July 2016	DF	(Albania) Denis Peposhi	(Albania) Korabi Peshkopi	Undisclosed
1 July 2016	DF	(Albania) Renato Malota	(Albania) Partizani Tirana	Undisclosed
5 July 2016	FW	(Albania) Ansi Nika	(Albania) Tirana	Undisclosed
29 July 2016	FW	(Brazil) Mateus	(Brazil) Santos	Free
1 August 2016	MF	(Montenegro) Marko Šćepanović	(Montenegro) Iskra Danilovgrad	Free
2 August 2016	MF	(Brazil) Philippe Guimarães	Released	Free

== Competitions ==
=== Kategoria Superiore ===
==== League table ====
Pos	Team	Pld	W	D	L	GF	GA	GD	Pts	Qualification or relegation
1	Kukësi (C)	36	20	15	1	51	18	+33	75	Qualification for the Champions League second qualifying round
2	Partizani	36	19	15	2	46	17	+29	72 (Note: Partizani ahead of Skënderbeu on head-to-head record; Partizani–Skënderbeu 0–0, Skënderbeu–Partizani 1–2, Partizani–Skënderbeu 1–0, Skënderbeu–Partizani 2–2.)	Qualification for the Europa League first qualifying round
3	Skënderbeu	36	21	9	6	45	22	+23	72	Qualification for the Europa League first qualifying round
4	Luftëtari	36	11	11	14	37	45	−8	44	
5	Teuta	36	10	10	16	27	34	−7	40	

Source: Albanian Football Association (in Albanian), Soccerway
Rules for classification: 1) Points; 2) Head-to-head points; 3) Head-to-head goal difference; 4) Head-to-head goals scored; 5) Goal difference; 6) Goals scored; 7) Draw.
(C) Champions

==== Results summary ====
Overall								Home						Away					
Pld	W	D	L	GF	GA	GD	Pts	W	D	L	GF	GA	GD	W	D	L	GF	GA	GD
36	20	15	1	51	18	+33	75	15	3	0	32	5	+27	5	12	1	19	13	+6

Last updated: 27 May 2017.

==== Result round by round ====
Round	1	2	3	4	5	6	7	8	9	10	11	12	13	14	15	16	17	18	19	20	21	22	23	24	25	26	27	28	29	30	31	32	33	34	35	36
Ground	A	H	A	A	H	A	H	A	H	H	A	H	H	A	H	A	H	A	A	H	A	A	H	A	H	A	H	H	A	H	H	A	H	A	H	A
Result	D	W	D	D	W	D	W	D	W	W	W	D	W	D	W	D	W	D	W	W	W	D	D	D	W	D	W	D	W	W	W	D	W	W	W	L
Position	3	2	2	2	1	1	1	1	1	1	1	1	1	1	1	1	1	1	1	1	1	1	1	1	1	1	1	1	1	1	1	1	1	1	1	1

Source: Soccerway
A = Away; H = Home; W = Win; D = Draw; L = Loss

==== Matches ====
Win Draw Loss

8 September 2016 1	Vllaznia Shkodër	0–0	Kukesi	Shkodër
19:00 CET	Bardulla (yellow card) 20'; Pepa (yellow card) 41'; Cicmil (yellow card) 58'	Report	Musolli (yellow card) 29'; Emini (yellow card) 31'; Arbri (yellow card) 53'	Stadium: Loro Boriçi Stadium; Attendance: 3,000; Referee: Enea Jorgji

12 September 2016 2	Kukesi	3–0	Teuta Durrës	Kukës
16:00 CET	Pejić 58' (pen.), 84'; Rangel (yellow card) 71'; Greca 90'	Report	Hoxha (yellow card) 57'; Čmajčanin (yellow card) 74'	Stadium: Zeqir Ymeri Stadium; Attendance: 2,000; Referee: Kridens Meta

17 September 2016 3	Tirana	2–2	Kukesi	Tirana
17:50 CET	Lika (yellow card) 7'; Taku 30'; Kërçiku (yellow card) 45'; Ndockyt 66'	Report	Pejić 8' (pen.); Alla (yellow card) 42'; Emini 57'; Greca (yellow card) 58'; Pashaj (yellow card) 79' (yellow-red card) 90'	Stadium: Selman Stërmasi Stadium; Attendance: 1,500; Referee: Lorenc Jemini

24 September 2016 4	Laçi	0–0	Kukesi	Laç
14:00 CET	Bruno Aquino (yellow card) 14'	Report	Alla (yellow card) 15'; Emini (yellow card) 57'; Jean Carioca (yellow card) 59'	Stadium: Laçi Stadium; Attendance: 1,000; Referee: Andi Koçi

1 October 2016 5	Kukesi	1–0	Partizani Tirana	Kukës
14:00 CET	Pashaj (yellow card) 34'; Pejić 47'; Lena (yellow card) 48'; Shameti (yellow card) 67'; Hasani (yellow card) 85'; Hallaçi (yellow card) 89'; Rangel (yellow card) 90'	Report	Ekuban (yellow card) 42'; Torassa (yellow card) 89'; Krasniqi (yellow card) 90'	Stadium: Zeqir Ymeri Stadium; Attendance: 1,500; Referee: Enea Jorgji

12 October 2016 6	Flamurtari Vlorë	1–1	Kukesi	Vlorë
17:00 CET	Berisha 19'; Kuqi (yellow card) 22'; Veliu (yellow card) 44'	Report	Pashaj (yellow card) 26' (yellow-red card) 30'; Pejić 60'; Alla (yellow card) 79'; Rangel (yellow card) 90+2'	Stadium: Flamurtari Stadium; Attendance: 1,500; Referee: Eldorjan Hamiti

16 October 2016 7	Kukesi	2–0	Korabi Peshkopi	Kukës
14:00 CET	Dvorneković 16'; Lena (yellow card) 68'; Pejić 89'	Report	Prifti (yellow card) 17'; Zguro (yellow card) 68'	Stadium: Zeqir Ymeri Stadium; Attendance: 800; Referee: Blerim Ziri

22 October 2016 8	Skënderbeu Korçë	0–0	Kukesi	Korçë
17:00 CET	Radas (yellow card) 23'; Osmani (yellow card) 38'	Report	Hasani (yellow card) 9'; Lena (yellow card) 56'; Jean Carioca (yellow card) 77'	Stadium: Skënderbeu Stadium; Attendance: 5,000; Referee: Kridens Meta

29 October 2016 9	Kukesi	1–0	Luftëtari Gjirokastër	Kukës
14:00 CET	Emini 61'; Greca (yellow card) 61'; Shameti (yellow card) 60'	Report	Mersini (yellow card) 56'; Aleksi (yellow card) 88'	Stadium: Zeqir Ymeri Stadium; Attendance: 800; Referee: Olsi Sokoli

6 November 2016 10	Kukesi	3–1	Vllaznia Shkodër	Kukës
14:00 CET	Pejić 18', 39' (pen.); Shameti (yellow card) 49'; Guri 60'; Jean Carioca (yellow card) 72'; Koliqi (yellow card) 85'	Report	Weitzer (yellow card) 36'; Agović (yellow card) 39'; Shtubina 45'; Bardulla (yellow card) 83'	Stadium: Zeqir Ymeri Stadium; Attendance: 1,000; Referee: Juxhin Xhaja

21 November 2016 11	Teuta Durrës	1–2	Kukesi	Durrës
18:00 CET	Musta (yellow card) 22'; Bangal 46' (yellow card) 47'; Hoxha (yellow card) 79'	Report	Emini (yellow card) 14'; Lena (yellow card) 50'; Rangel 80' (yellow card) 80'; Lushtaku 85'; Alla (yellow card) 90+3'	Stadium: Niko Dovana Stadium; Attendance: 1,000; Referee: Enea Jorgji

26 November 2016 12	Kukesi	0–0	Tirana	Kukës
14:00 CET	Hallaçi (yellow card) 38'; Alla (yellow card) 62'; Musolli (yellow card) 90+4'	Report	Daja (yellow card) 63'; Ndockyt (yellow card) 79'	Stadium: Zeqir Ymeri Stadium; Attendance: 3,600; Referee: Kridens Meta

30 November 2016 13	Kukesi	2–0	Laçi	Kukës
14:00 CET	Dvorneković 29'; Emini 65'; Lushtaku (yellow card) 75'	Report	Toski (yellow card) 42'; Çelhaka (yellow card) 78'; Alechenwu (yellow card) 90'	Stadium: Zeqir Ymeri Stadium; Attendance: 3,000; Referee: Enea Jorgji

6 December 2016 14	Partizani Tirana	0–0	Kukesi	Elbasan
17:00 CET	Kalari (yellow card) 90+2'	Report	Alla (yellow card) 43'	Stadium: Elbasan Arena; Attendance: 800; Referee: Lorenc Jemini

10 December 2016 15	Kukesi	1–0	Flamurtari Vlorë	Kukës
14:00 CET	Emini 23'; Lena (yellow card) 89'	Report	Telushi (yellow card) 24'; Danilo Alves (yellow card) 30'; Marku (yellow card) 61'	Stadium: Zeqir Ymeri Stadium; Attendance: 300; Referee: Olsi Sokoli

14 December 2016 16	Korabi Peshkopi	1–1	Kukesi	Kukës
14:00 CET	Prifti (yellow card) 43'; Gavazaj 45+2'; Spahija (red card) 53'; Çela (yellow card) 63'; Vujadinović (yellow card) 77'; Zefi (yellow card) 78'	Report	Lushtaku 49'	Stadium: Zeqir Ymeri Stadium; Attendance: 800; Referee: Juxhin Xhaja

18 December 2016 17	Kukesi	2–0	Skënderbeu Korçë	Kukës
14:00 CET	Pejić 35', 44' (pen.); Musolli (yellow card) 45'; Lushtaku (yellow card) 76'	Report	Llapanji (red card) 81'	Stadium: Zeqir Ymeri Stadium; Attendance: 3,400; Referee: Lorenc Jemini

22 December 2016 18	Luftëtari Gjirokastër	2–2	Kukesi	Gjirokastër
14:00 CET	Reginaldo 5'; Ramadani (yellow card) 35'; Bregu (yellow card) 81'; Rapo 88'	Report	Pejić 36' (pen.); Imami (yellow card) 60'; Emini 66'; Lena (yellow card) 84'; Dema (yellow card) 90+2'	Stadium: Gjirokastra Stadium; Attendance: 450; Referee: Klajdi Kola

27 January 2017 19	Vllaznia Shkodër	0–1	Kukesi	Shkodër
18:00 CET	Cicmil (yellow card) 21'; Krymi (yellow card) 54'; Pjeshka (yellow card) 82'	Report	Lena (yellow card) 64'; Pejić 84'	Stadium: Loro Boriçi Stadium; Attendance: 500; Referee: Andi Koçi

5 February 2017 20	Kukesi	1–0	Teuta Durrës	Kukës
14:00 CET	Emini 37'; Alla (yellow card) 41'; Hasani (yellow card) 78'; Lena (yellow card) 88'	Report	Beqja (yellow card) 37'; Čmajčanin (yellow card) 58'; Hila (yellow card) 67'; Sykaj (yellow card) 90+2'	Stadium: Zeqir Ymeri Stadium; Attendance: 2,000; Referee: Laver Alla

11 February 2017 21	Tirana	1–2	Kukesi	Tirana
17:00 CET	Taku 38'	Report	Pejić 57'; Jean Carioca (yellow card) 65'; Emini 83'	Stadium: Selman Stërmasi Stadium; Attendance: 1,000; Referee: Enea Jorgji

20 February 2017 22	Laçi	0–0	Kukesi	Laç
14:30 CET	Vucaj (yellow card) 40'; Qaqi (yellow card) 45'; Musaj (yellow card) 75'	Report	Simos Rrumbullaku (yellow card) 10'; Alla (yellow card) 45+1'	Stadium: Laçi Stadium; Attendance: 3,000; Referee: Eldorjan Hamiti

26 February 2017 23	Kukesi	0–0	Partizani Tirana	Kukës
14:00 CET	Hasani (yellow card) 31'; Roumpoulakos (yellow card) 46'; Shameti (yellow card) 52'; Alla (yellow card) 57'	Report	Batha (yellow card) 44'	Stadium: Zeqir Ymeri Stadium; Attendance: 4,500; Referee: Andi Koçi

5 March 2017 24	Flamurtari Vlorë	1–1	Kukesi	Vlorë
14:00 CET	Danilo Almeida Alves 39'; Bušić (yellow card) 77'; Jakovljević (red card) 82'	Report	Hallaçi (yellow card) 45'; Lena (yellow card) 53' (yellow-red card) 67'; Guri 58'; Pejić (yellow card) 73'; Lushtaku (yellow card) 83'	Stadium: Flamurtari Stadium; Attendance: 6,000; Referee: Enea Jorgji

11 March 2017 25	Kukesi	4–0	Korabi Peshkopi	Kukës
14:00 CET	Pejić 25', 72' (pen.); Elton Calé 42'; Dvorneković 60'; Alla (yellow card) 67'	Report	Mziu (yellow card) 23'; Hoxhaj (yellow card) 38'; Shabani (yellow card) 69'; Laço (yellow card) 71'	Stadium: Zeqir Ymeri Stadium; Attendance: 600; Referee: Blerim Ziri

17 March 2017 26	Skënderbeu Korçë	1–1	Kukesi	Korçë
18:00 CET	Latifi 12' (yellow card) 73'; Mici (yellow card) 73'	Report	Dvorneković (yellow card) 58'; Elton Calé (yellow card) 77' (goal) 89'	Stadium: Skënderbeu Stadium; Attendance: 5,000; Referee: Kridens Meta

2 April 2017 27	Kukesi	3–2	Luftëtari Gjirokastër	Kukës
16:00 CET	Shameti 4' (yellow card) 89'; Boyom 21' (o.g.); Pejić 29'; Elton Calé (yellow card) 44'; Hallaçi (yellow card) 83'	Report	Lamçja 8'; Beqiri 80'; Pedro Bengui (yellow card) 83'; Reginaldo (yellow card) 85'; Boyom (yellow card) 88'	Stadium: Zeqir Ymeri Stadium; Attendance: 3,000; Referee: Enea Jorgji

9 April 2017 28	Kukesi	0–0	Vllaznia Shkodër	Kukës
16:00 CET	Lushtaku (yellow card) 78'; Rangel (yellow card) 86'; Imami (yellow card) 89'	Report	Vrapi (yellow card) 19'; Gurishta (yellow card) 68'; Bakaj (yellow card) 88'; Selimaj (yellow card) 90+6'	Stadium: Zeqir Ymeri Stadium; Attendance: 1,500; Referee: Andi Koçi

15 April 2017 29	Teuta Durrës	0–2	Kukesi	Durrës
19:00 CET	Čmajčanin (yellow card) 44'; Kotobelli (yellow card) 54'; Musta (yellow card) 71'	Report	Pejić 55' (pen.) 79'; Jean Carioca (yellow card) 61'; Elton Calé (yellow card) 68'; Imami (yellow card) 88'; Guri (yellow card) 90+2'	Stadium: Niko Dovana Stadium; Attendance: 700; Referee: Eldorjan Hamiti

23 April 2017 30	Kukesi	4–1	Tirana	Kukës
16:00 CET	Emini 55'; Pejić 62' (pen.), 89'; Jean Carioca 80'	Report	Cake (yellow card) 62'; Turtulli 74'	Stadium: Zeqir Ymeri Stadium; Attendance: 800; Referee: Kreshnik Cjapi

29 April 2017 31	Kukesi	2–1	Laçi	Kukës
16:00 CET	Musolli (yellow card) 9'; Pejić 45+2', 53'	Report	Musaj (yellow card) 10'; Sefgjinaj (yellow card) 16'; Jonuzi 47'	Stadium: Zeqir Ymeri Stadium; Attendance: 1,500; Referee: Kridens Meta

5 May 2017 32	Partizani Tirana	1–1	Kukesi	Tirana
19:00 CET	Vila (yellow card) 12'; Torassa (yellow card) 17'; Shameti 46' (o.g.); Malota (yellow card) 50'; Ćetković (yellow card) 73'	Report	Dvorneković 21'; Alla (yellow card) 36'; Shameti (yellow card) 44'	Stadium: Selman Stërmasi Stadium; Attendance: 7,000; Referee: Matej Jug (Slovenia)

10 May 2017 33	Kukesi	1–0	Flamurtari Vlorë	Kukës
16:00 CET	Pejić 33'; Jean Carioca (yellow card) 90'; Rangel (yellow card) 90+3'	Report	Ergis Mersini (yellow card) 26'; Veliu (yellow card) 32'; Fazliu (yellow card) 79'; Telushi (yellow card) 90'; Mauricio Leal (yellow card) 90+3'	Stadium: Zeqir Ymeri Stadium; Attendance: 1,000; Referee: Eldorjan Hamiti

15 May 2017 34	Korabi Peshkopi	1–3	Kukesi	Elbasan
16:00 CET	Kaloshi 7'	Report	Pejić 33', 63' (pen.), 84'	Stadium: Elbasan Arena; Attendance: 200; Referee: Indrit Myrtja

20 May 2017 35	Kukesi	2–0	Skënderbeu Korçë	Kukës
17:30 CET	Shameti (yellow card) 34'; Pejić 47' (pen.), 90+2' (yellow card) 63'; Musolli (yellow card) 80'	Report	Radas (yellow card) 3'; Mici (red card) 11'; Latifi (yellow card) 58'; Osmani (red card) 58'	Stadium: Zeqir Ymeri Stadium; Attendance: 5,000; Referee: Enea Jorgji

27 May 2017 36	Luftëtari Gjirokastër	1–0	Kukesi	Gjirokastër
17:00 CET	Bregu 11' (pen.) (yellow card) 12'; Beqiri (yellow card) 79'	Report		Stadium: Gjirokastra Stadium; Attendance: 1,000; Referee: Klodian Shahini

=== Albanian Cup ===
==== First round ====
28 September 2016 First leg	Tomori Berat	0–3	Kukesi	Berat
16:00 CET		Report	Rangel 41'; Guri 75' (pen.), 85'	Stadium: Tomori Stadium; Attendance: 50; Referee: Blendi Breshani

5 October 2016 Second leg	Kukesi	1–0 (4–0 agg.)	Tomori Berat	Pezë Helmës
14:00 CET	Bitri 89' (o.g.)	Report	Serdari (yellow card) 63'	Stadium: Internacional Complex; Referee: Klodjan Prenga

==== Second round ====
26 October 2016 First leg	Dinamo Tirana	0–2	Kukesi	Pezë Helmës
14:00 CET		Report	Greca 4'; Imami (yellow card) 34'; Guri (yellow card) 40'; Emini 81'	Stadium: Internacional Complex; Attendance: 30; Referee: Indrit Myrtja

16 November 2016 Second leg	Kukesi	0–0 (2–0 agg.)	Dinamo Tirana	Pezë Helmës
13:30 CET	Jonuzi (yellow card) 62'	Report	Zefi (yellow card) 67'	Stadium: Internacional Complex; Attendance: 50; Referee: Olsi Sokoli

==== Quarter-finals ====
1 February 2017 First leg	Tirana	2–1	Kukesi	Tirana
17:00	Halili 30'; Taku 45'; Domgjoni (yellow card) 54'; Edeh (yellow card) 59'	Report	Imami 47'; Musolli (yellow card) 59'; Elton Calé (yellow card) 75'	Stadium: Selman Stërmasi Stadium; Attendance: 500; Referee: Eldorjan Hamiti

15 February 2017 Second leg	Kukesi	0–0 (1–2 agg.)	Tirana	Kukës
13:30	Memini (yellow card) 34'; Hasani (yellow card) 38'	Report	Halili (yellow card) 38'	Stadium: Zeqir Ymeri Stadium; Attendance: 1,500; Referee: Kridens Meta

=== Albanian Supercup ===
24 August 2016 Final	Skënderbeu Korçë	1–3	Kukësi	Tirana
19:00 CET	Fukui 30'	Report	Arbri (yellow card) 13'; Dvorneković 26'; Emini 74'; Hallaçi (yellow card) 88'; Pejić 90+1' (yellow card) 90+2'	Stadium: Selman Stërmasi Stadium; Attendance: 2,000; Referee: Lorenc Jemini

=== UEFA Europa League ===
==== First qualifying round ====
30 June 2016 First leg	Kukësi (Albania)	1–1	(Montenegro) Rudar Pljevlja	Elbasan, Albania
19:00 CET	Rangel 32'	Report	M. Radanović 71' (pen.)	Stadium: Elbasan Arena (Note: Kukësi played their home match at Elbasan Arena, Elbasan, instead of their regular stadium Zeqir Ymeri Stadium, Kukës.); Attendance: 104; Referee: Roi Reinschreiber (Israel)

7 July 2016 Second leg	Rudar Pljevlja (Montenegro)	0–1 (1–2 agg.)	(Albania) Kukësi	Nikšić, Montenegro
17:30 CET		Report	S. Guri 79'	Stadium: Gradski stadion (Note: Rudar Pljevlja played their home match at Gradski stadion, Nikšić, instead of their regular stadium Gradski stadion, Pljevlja.); Attendance: 486; Referee: João Capela (Portugal)

==== Second qualifying round ====
14 July 2016 First leg	Austria Wien	1–0	(Albania) Kukësi	Vienna, Austria
21:05 CET	F. Pires 24'	Report		Stadium: Ernst-Happel-Stadion (Note: Austria Wien played their home match at Ernst-Happel-Stadion, Vienna, instead of their regular stadium Franz Horr Stadium, Vienna, due to reconstruction.); Attendance: 4,312; Referee: Paolo Valeri (Italy)

21 July 2016 Second leg	Kukësi (Albania)	1–4 (1–5 agg.)	Austria Wien	Elbasan, Albania
19:30 CET	R. Hallaçi 78'	Report	O. Kayode 16', 58'; R. Holzhauser 67'; C. Martschinko 90+4'	Stadium: Elbasan Arena; Attendance: 1,580; Referee: Vilhjálmur Alvar Þórarinsson (Iceland)
