= 2016 Albanian Cup final =

Albanian football match

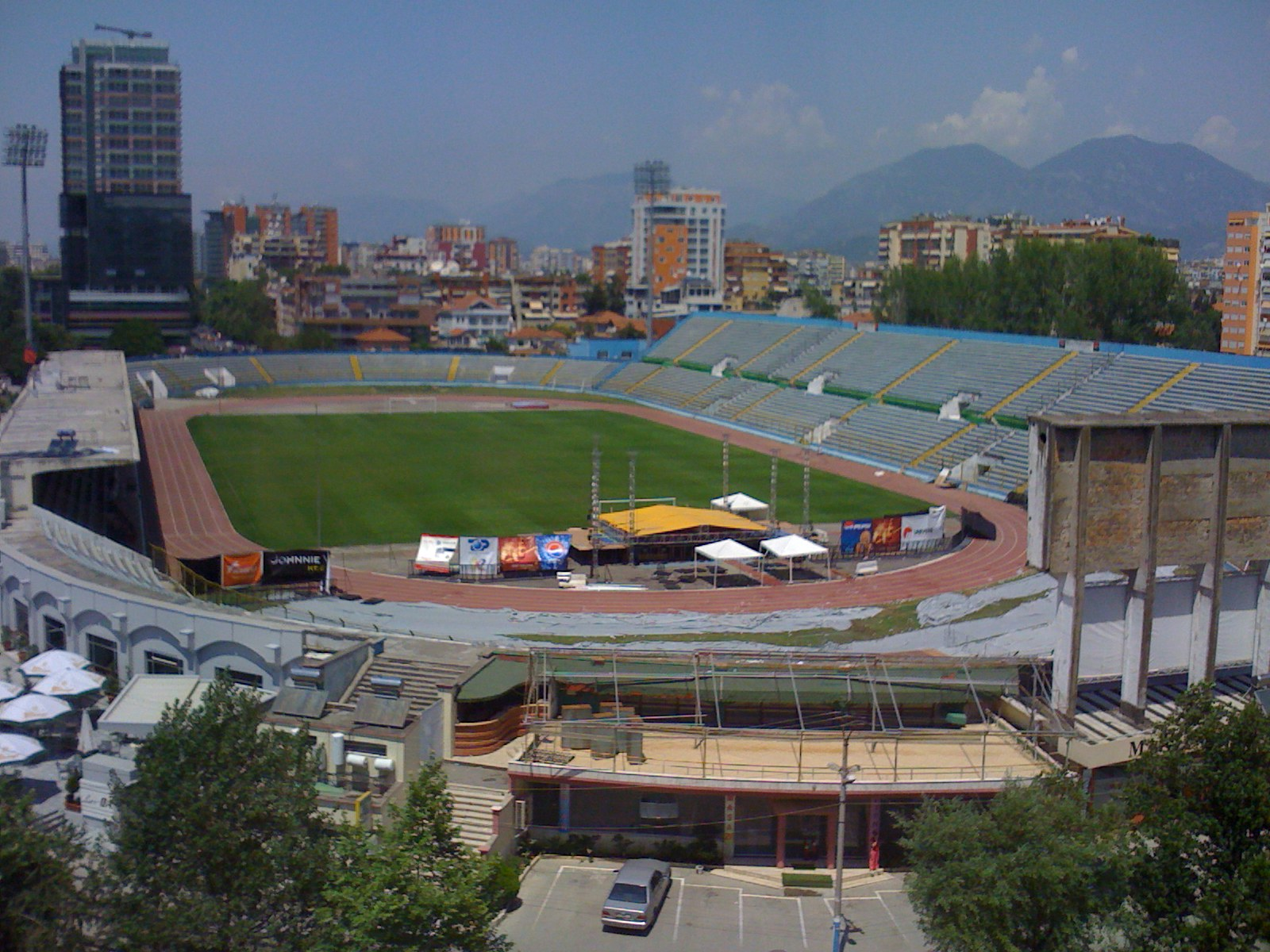
- The Qemal Stafa Stadium in Tirana were host the final
- Event: 2015–16 Albanian Cup
Laçi	Kukësi
1	1
- Kukësi won 5–3 on penalties
- Date: 22 May 2016
- Venue: Qemal Stafa Stadium, Tirana
- Man of the Match: Jean Carioca (Kukësi)
- Referee: (Italy) Marco Guida

The 2016 Albanian Cup final was a football match played on 22 May 2016 to decide the winner of the 2015–16 Albanian Cup, the 64th edition of Albania's primary football cup.

It was won by the first time by Kukësi 5–3 on penalties after the regular and extra time finished in a 1–1. Kukësi thus won its first Albanian Cup title, missing the opportunity last season where it was defeated by Laçi itself. It was the third consecutive cup final for Kukësi while Laçi had the opportunity to win the title for the third time in the last four editions. For the first time in the history of Albanian football, a cup final match was judged by foreign referees.

As Kukësi won both the Albanian Cup and Skënderbeu Korçë won the 2015–16 Albanian Superliga, the 2016 Albanian Supercup will be between Skënderbeu Korçë and Kukësi.

== Background ==
Laçi had previously played in 2 Albanian Cup finals, winning both respectively against Bylis Ballsh in 2013 and Kukësi in 2015. They were the reigning champions, having defeated Kukësi 2–1 in the previous year's final at their Qemal Stafa Stadium.

Kukësi had been to two, losing both, respectively in 2014 to Flamurtari Vlorë and in 2015 to Laçi. The 2016 final was the second between the two sides.

It will be the 5th consecutive final at the Qemal Stafa Stadium in Tirana, home of Partizani Tirana.

== Route to the final ==
Laçi			Round	Kukësi
Opponent	Result	Legs		Opponent	Result	Legs
Besa Kavajë	4–2	3–1 away; 1–1 home	First round	Naftëtari Kuçovë	5–4	1–3 away; 4–1 home
Bylis Ballsh	3–2	0–0 away; 3–2 home	Second round	Iliria Fushë-Krujë	8–1	5–0 away; 3–1 home
Partizani Tirana	2–1	0–1 away; 2–0 home	Quarterfinals	Teuta Durrës	2–1	0–1 away; 2–0 home
Skënderbeu Korçë	2–2a	1–0 home; 1–2 away	Semifinals	Flamurtari Vlorë	4–0	2–0 away; 2–0 home

=== Laçi ===
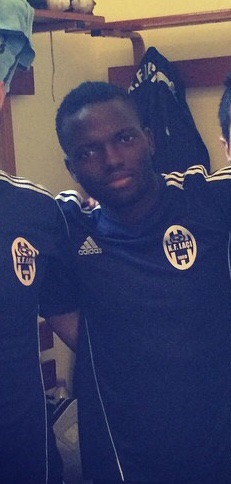
James Adeniyi was the main instrument in Laçi's run to the final, scoring five goals in three appearances, including a hat-trick in a 3–2 win over Bylis Ballsh.

Laçi, of Albanian Superliga, entered the tournament in the first round, against Besa Kavajë of Albanian First Division. The first leg in Besa Stadium, on 16 September 2015, ended in a 3–1 convincing win for Laçi, with manager Armando Cungu who used his best eleven to secure the qualify fast. In the returning leg two week later, Laçi drew 1–1 by using players which were not used too much in the league. Dardan Vuthaj scored the only goal of his team in the 82nd minute.

In the second round, Laçi played their fellow relegation league strugglers Bylis Ballsh. They played the first leg on 21 October which ended in a goalless draw. In the returning leg, however, Laçi won 3–2 thanks to a James Adeniyi hat-trick; Stipe Buljan also scored an own goal in the first half.

Laçi met Partizani Tirana in the quarter-finals, a repeat of last year's quarter-final. On 23 January at Laçi Stadium, they won 2–0 with second-half strikes of James Adeniyi. In the returning leg on 17 February, the "Red Bulls" won, 1–0, at home thanks to the goal of Xhevahir Sukaj, but Laçi managed to progress into the semi-final for the second consecutive season.

In the semi-finals, Laçi met Skënderbeu Korçë, and won, 1–0, in the home leg on 6 April; Marko Ćetković scored the lone goal in the second half. In the returning leg two weeks later, Skënderbeu won 2–1 but thanks to Ćetković's temporary equalizer goal, Laçi were able to secure a spot in the final thanks to the away goal rule.

=== Kukësi ===
Kukësi, also in Albanian Superliga, entered at the same stage against a third-tier opponent, Naftëtari Kuçovë. In the first leg in Bashkim Sulejmani Stadium on 16 September 2015, they suffered a shock defeat 3–1 as the own goal of Gucaj was bounced by the strikes of Kopaçi and Behari; in the returning leg two weeks later at the Zeqir Ymeri Stadium, Kukësi overturned the first-leg results and won 4–1 after extra time; Fjoart Jonuzi scored two decisive goals, including one in the 118th minute of the match.

In the second round, Kukësi met another low-league side, Iliria Fushë-Krujë. In the first leg away on 21 October, Kukësi secured a spot to the quarter-final by scoring five times in the Iliria Fushë-Krujë net. In the returning leg of Albanian Cup second round, the team overwhelmed 3–0 Iliria Fushë-Krujë at home, securing an 8–1 aggregate victory and progression to the quarter-finals. Two goals from Mateus Lima and one strike from Bledar Musolli secured the victory.

In the quarter-finals, Kukësi faced Teuta Durrës. On 23 January, Kukësi was defeated 1–0 at away leg; Ardit Hila scored the lone goal in the 20th minute. In the returning leg at home, Kukësi won 2–0 thanks to the goals from Ylli Shameti and Renato Malota, the centre-backs of the team.

Kukësi were tasked with out of form Flamurtari Vlorë in the semi-finals. In the first leg away on 6 April, Edon Hasani scored an early goal in the 11th minute which was followed by Shameti's header nine minutes later, which almost had qualified Kukësi in the final. On 20 April, in the returning leg of Albanian Cup, Kukësi recorded another 2–0 win against Flamurtari, securing a 4–0 aggregate victory and progression in the final for the second consecutive season.

== Pre-match ==
Before the final, both teams required foreign referees for the match. That was more specifically the request of Kukësi rather than Laçi.

== Match ==
22 May 2016
19:00 CEST

Laçi	1–1 (a.e.t.)	Kukësi
Mitraj 90+4'	Report	Jean Carioca 65'
Penalties
Dosti (penalty missed); Ćetković (penalty scored); Zefi (penalty scored); Buljan (penalty scored)	3–5	(penalty scored) Jean Carioca; (penalty scored) Dvorneković; (penalty scored) Emini; (penalty scored) Hallaçi; (penalty scored) Musolli

Qemal Stafa Stadium, Tirana
Attendance: 5,000
Referee: Marco Guida

Laçi	Kukësi

GK	1	(Albania) Gentian Selmani
RB	2	(Brazil) Ademir
CB	4	(Croatia) Stipe Buljan
CB	5	(Albania) Arjan Sheta	(yellow card) 99'
LB	3	(Albania) Emiliano Çela	(yellow card) 5'	(substituted off) 120'
RM	21	(Albania) Olsi Gocaj	(yellow card) 10'
CM	20	(Kosovo) Argjend Mustafa	(yellow card) 30'
CM	28	(Albania) Emiljano Veliaj (c)		(substituted off) 74'
LM	11	(Albania) Taulant Sefgjinaj		(substituted off) 68'
CF	10	(Montenegro) Marko Ćetković
CF	19	(Albania) Valdan Nimani	(yellow card) 110'
Substitutes:
GK	31	(Montenegro) Miroslav Vujadinović
MF	7	(Albania) Albi Dosti	(yellow card) 108'	(substituted on) 74'
FW	9	(Albania) Aldo Mitraj	(yellow card) 89'	(substituted on) 68'
DF	16	(Albania) Eglentin Gjoni
FW	17	(Albania) Enco Malindi
MF	22	(Albania) Alfred Zefi		(substituted on) 44'
FW	33	(Kosovo) Drilon Musaj
Head Coach:
(Albania) Ramadan Ndreu

GK	31	(Albania) Enea Koliqi
RB	13	(Albania) Rrahman Hallaçi (c)
CB	4	(Albania) Ylli Shameti
CB	24	(Albania) Renato Malota	(yellow card) 37'
LB	7	(Albania) Gledi Mici	(yellow card) 52'
RM	10	(Brazil) Jean Carioca	(yellow card) 92'
CM	17	(Albania) Ansi Nika	(red card) 73'
CM	16	(Albania) Edon Hasani		(substituted off) 46'
LM	23	(Albania) Besar Musolli
CF	21	(Croatia) Matija Dvorneković
CF	8	(North Macedonia) Izair Emini	(yellow card) 24'
Substitutes:
GK	12	(Albania) Ervis Koçi
FW	11	(Albania) Mario Morina
MF	14	(Albania) Rexhep Memini		(substituted on) 80'
MF	18	(Albania) Nertil Ferraj
MF	18	(Brazil) Felipe Moreira	(yellow card) 77'	(substituted on) 46'	(substituted off) 80'
FW	19	(Brazil) Mateus Lima
DF	30	(Kosovo) Lapidar Lladrovci
Head Coach:
(Albania) Klodian Duro

Assistant referees:
Lorenzo Manganelli
Alessandro Costanzo
Fourth official:
Enea Jorgji

Match rules

- 90 minutes.
- 30 minutes of extra time if necessary.
- Penalty shoot-out if score is still level.
- Seven named substitutes, of which up to three may be used.
