= Kushtrim Lushtaku =

Kosovan footballer (born 1989)

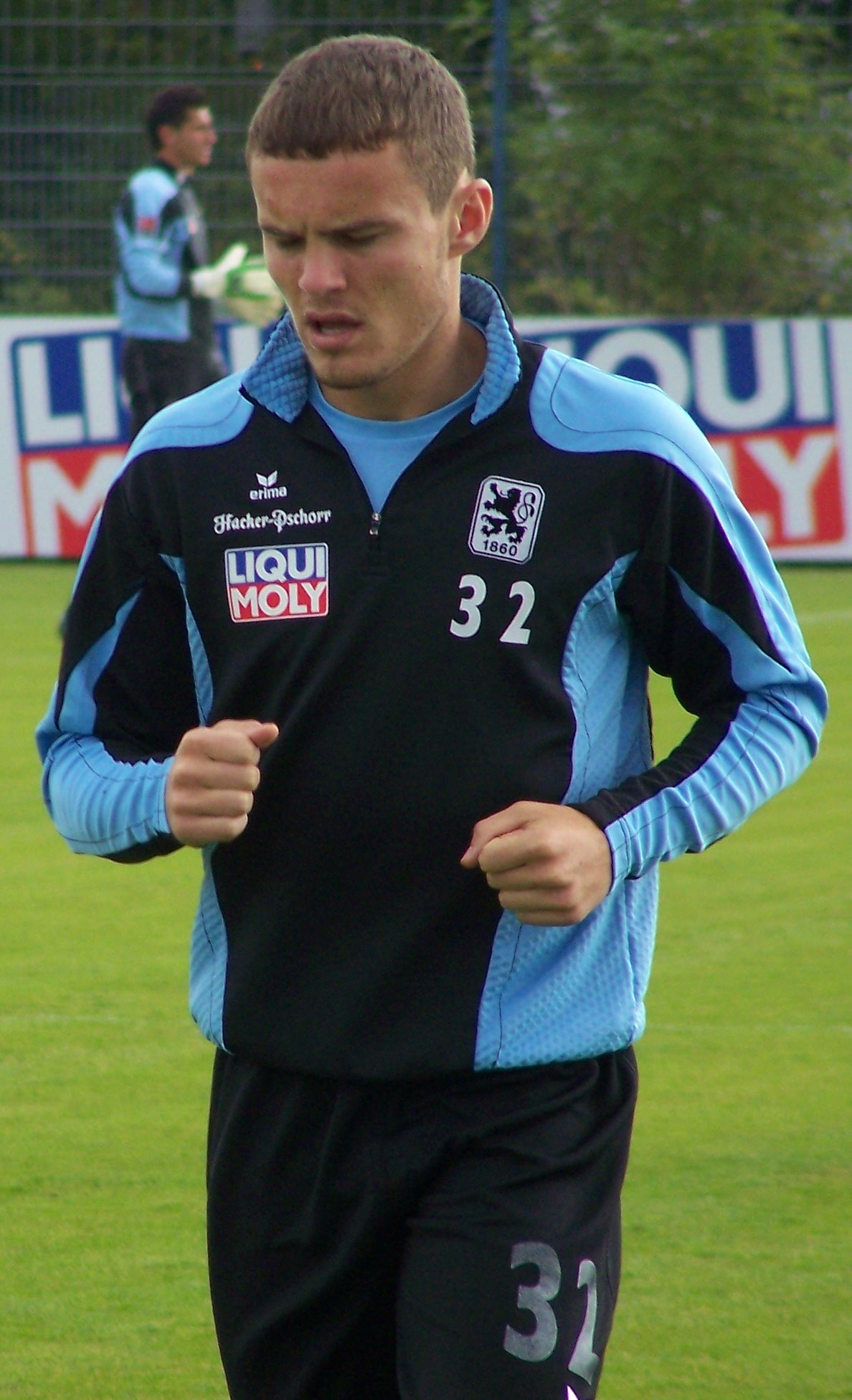
- Lushtaku with 1860 Munich II

Personal information
- Full name: Kushtrim Lushtaku
- Date of birth: 8 October 1989 (age 37)
- Place of birth: Skenderaj, SFR Yugoslavia
- Height: 1.80 m (5 ft 11 in)
- Position: Attacking midfielder

Team information
- Current team: Türkspor Neckarsulm (player-manager)
- Number: 99

Youth career
- 1994–1998: TG Offenau
- 1998–1999: FSV Bad Friedrichshall
- 1999–2006: VfR Heilbronn

Senior career*
Years	Team	Apps	(Gls)
2006–2008	TSG Backnang	10	(0)
2008–2009	Drenica	25	(10)
2009–2011	1860 Munich II	27	(1)
2011–2013	Örebro	36	(4)
2013–2014	Fortuna Köln	6	(0)
2014–2015	Kukësi	38	(6)
2015–2016	Flamurtari Vlorë	21	(3)
2016–2017	Kukësi	19	(2)
2017	Trepça'89	1	(0)
2017–2018	1. CfR Pforzheim	22	(3)
2019–	Türkspor Neckarsulm	13	(8)

International career^{‡}
2008–2010	Kosovo U21		
2014	Kosovo	1	(0)

Managerial career
- 2019–: Türkspor Neckarsulm (player-manager)
- * Club domestic league appearances and goals as of 8 December 2019 ‡ National team caps and goals as of 7 September 2014

Kushtrim Lushtaku (born 8 October 1989) is a Kosovan professional footballer and manager who plays as an attacking midfielder and acts as a player-manager for Türkspor Neckarsulm.

== Early life ==
Lushtaku was born in Skenderaj, SFR Yugoslavia but raised in Heilbronn, Germany.

== Club career ==
He began his career with TG Offenau. After four years there, he joined FSV Bad Friedrichshall in summer 1998. He played for FSV Bad Friedrichshall for only one year. In July 1999, he signed for VfR Heilbronn and moved after two years to city rival FC Heilbronn. Lushtaku played for five years for FC Heilbronn before joining TSG Backnang 1919 in summer 2006. After two successful years with TSG Backnang 1919 Lushtaku signed his first professional contract in the newly formed Kosovar Superliga for KF Drenica. In his first professional season he played 25 games, scored nine goals and rendered fifteen assists for his club.

=== 1860 München ===
In summer 2009, he left KF Drenica and signed a four-year contract with TSV 1860 München, on 30 July 2009.

=== Örebro ===
On 1 March 2011, Lushtaku signed with Allsvenskan team Örebro. He made his competitive debut on 21 April by playing full-90 minutes as Örebro defeated 2–1 Häcken. His first goal came later on 13 June in the match against Trelleborg, where Lushtaku scored in the last moments of the match as Örebro won 4–2.

=== Kukësi ===
On 18 June 2014, Lushtaku completed a transfer as a free agent to Albanian Superliga side Kukësi by penning a one-year contract.

=== Flamurtari Vlorë ===
On 31 August 2016, Lushtaku joined Flamurtari Vlorë on the deadline day by signing a one-year contract with an option of a further one.

=== Return to Kukësi ===
On 1 September 2016, Lushtaku rejoined Kukësi as a free agent, signing a contract for the 2016–17 season. He made his return debut on 28 September 2016 by playing full-90 minutes in Kukësi 0–3 away defeat of Tomori Berat valid for the first leg of 2016–17 Albanian Cup first round. His first league appearance came on matchday 9 against Luftëtari Gjirokastër where he played in the last 11 minutes of a 1–0 home win thanks to an Izair Emini winner. Lushtaku's first score-sheet contributions came later on 21 November in the match against Teuta Durrës, where he came as a substitute to score the winner in the last minutes of the match. His first match as starter came on matchday 16 where Kukësi stumbled into a 1–1 away draw against Korabi Peshkopi, with Lushtaku scoring his team's only goal.

Lushtaku's second part of season didn't go as expected, as he did not break through Ernest Gjoka's lineup, finishing the season with 19 league appearances, which only two of them were as starter, collecting 442 minutes as Kukësi won its maiden Albanian Superliga title. He also made 5 cup appearances, all of them as starter, as Kukësi were eliminated in quarter-finals by Tirana. On 29 May 2017, not happy with the playing time he was receiving, Lushtaku left the club by terminating his contract.

=== Trepça'89 ===
On 5 June 2017. Lushtaku joined with Football Superleague of Kosovo champions Trepça'89.

=== 1. CfR Pforzheim ===
On 1 October 2017. Lushtaku joined Oberliga Baden-Württemberg side 1. CfR Pforzheim. On 7 October 2017, he made his debut in a 0–2 home defeat against Bahlinger SC after being named in the starting line-up.

=== Türkspor Neckarsulm ===
At the beginning of August 2019, Lushtaku joined Bezirksliga side Türkspor Neckarsulm, he made his debut on 25 August against FV Wüstenrot after being named in the starting line-up and scored his side's second goal during a 4–1 home win. At the beginning of September 2019, Lushtaku appointed as player-manager and on 12 September, he had his first match as Türkspor Neckarsulm player-manager in a 2–1 away defeat against Aramäer Heilbronn.

== International career ==
=== Senior ===
On 7 September 2014. Lushtaku making his debut with Kosovo in a friendly match against Oman after coming on as a substitute at 72nd minute in place of Shpëtim Hasani.

== Honours ==
Fortuna Köln

- Regionalliga West: 2013–14

Kukësi

- Albanian Superliga: 2016–17

Individual

- Albanian Superliga Player of the Month: November 2014
