= 2016 Albanian Supercup =

Kukësi	Skënderbeu Korçë
3	1
- Date: 25 August 2016
- Venue: Selman Stërmasi Stadium, Tirana
- Referee: Lorenc Jemini
- Attendance: 2,000
- Weather: Clear; 26 °C (79 °F)

The 2016 Albanian Supercup was the 23rd edition of the Albanian Supercup, an annual Albanian football match. The teams were decided by taking the winner of the previous season's Albanian Superliga and the winner of the Albanian Cup.

The match was contested by Skënderbeu Korçë, champions of the 2015–16 Albanian Superliga, and Kukësi, the 2015–16 Albanian Cup winners. Due to the demolition of the Qemal Stafa Stadium, the game was scheduled to be played at the newly reconstructed Loro Boriçi Stadium in Shkodër but the inauguration of the stadium was postponed until the friendly between Albania and Morocco on 31 August. The venue for the game was the Selman Stërmasi Stadium in Tirana, the home of Tirana, and Kukësi won the game 3–1. The game was broadcast through DigitAlb's SuperSport Albania.

== Details ==
25 August 2016
20:00 CET

Kukësi	3–1	Skënderbeu Korçë
Dvorneković 26'; Emini 74'; Pejić 90+1'	Report	Fukui 30'

Selman Stërmasi Stadium, Tirana
Attendance: 2,000
Referee: Lorenc Jemini

Kukësi	Skënderbeu

GK	1	(Albania) Enea Koliqi
RB	6	(Albania) Polizoi Arbëri	(yellow card) 13'
CB	4	(Albania) Ylli Shameti
CB	3	(Albania) Albi Alla
LB	13	(Albania) Rrahman Hallaçi (c)	(yellow card) 88'
MR	10	(Brazil) Jean Carioca
CM	23	(Albania) Besar Musolli
CM	16	(Albania) Edon Hasani
LM	21	(Croatia) Matija Dvorneković	(substituted off) 66'
CF	22	(Croatia) Pero Pejić	(yellow card) 90+2'
CF	8	(North Macedonia) Izair Emini	(substituted off) 79'
Substitutes:
GK	12	(Albania) Ervis Koçi
DF		(Albania) Entonio Pashaj
MF	11	(Albania) Bekim Dema
MF	18	(North Macedonia) Nijaz Lena	(substituted on) 79'
MF	22	(Albania) Bedri Greca	(substituted on) 66'
FW	9	(Albania) Sindri Guri
FW	19	(Brazil) Rangel
Manager:
(Albania) Ernest Gjoka

GK	1	(Albania) Orges Shehi (c)
RB	5	(Kosovo) Bajram Jashanica	(substituted off) 88'
CB	33	(Croatia) Marko Radas
CB	19	(Albania) Tefik Osmani
LF	3	(Albania) Gledi Mici
CM	88	(Albania) Sabjen Lilaj
CM	80	(Nigeria) Nurudeen Orelesi	(substituted off) 80'
CM	7	(Albania) Enis Gavazaj	(substituted on) 67'
LW	99	(Japan) Masato Fukui
RW	49	(Brazil) Serginho
CF	14	(Albania) Hamdi Salihi
Substitutes:
GK	12	(Albania) Erjon Llapanji
DF	4	(Albania) Bruno Lulaj
MF	11	(Kosovo) Leonit Abazi	(substituted on) 67'
MF	23	(Kosovo) Argjend Malaj
MF		(Kosovo) Argjend Mustafa
FW	78	(Nigeria) James Adeniyi	(substituted on) 80'
FW	9	(Albania) Sebino Plaku	(substituted on) 88'
Manager:
(Italy) Andrea Agostinelli

Match officials:

- Assistant referees:
  - Ilir Tartari
  - Dojando Myftari
- Fourth official: Kreshnik Cjapi (Albania)

Match rules

- 90 minutes
- 30 minutes extra-time if the scores still level
- Penalty shoot-out if scores still level
- Six named substitutes, of which three may be used

== See also ==
- 2015–16 Albanian Superliga
- 2015–16 Albanian Cup
