= Nijaz Lena =

Macedonian footballer

Personal information
- Date of birth: 25 June 1986 (age 40)
- Place of birth: Struga, SR Macedonia, SFR Yugoslavia
- Height: 1.75 m (5 ft 9 in)
- Position: Midfielder

Senior career*
Years	Team	Apps	(Gls)
2005–2008	Renova	29	(4)
2008–2010	Makedonija	37	(5)
2010–2015	Flamurtari Vlorë	145	(18)
2015–2016	Teuta Durrës	18	(1)
2016–2017	Kukësi	30	(0)
2017	Teuta Durrës	15	(2)
2018	Telavi	9	(0)
2018–2021	Struga	58	(13)
2021–2022	Veleshta	10	(6)
2022–2023	Langenthal	10	(0)

International career^{‡}
2005–2006	Macedonia U19	5	(1)
2014	Macedonia	2	(0)

Managerial career
- 2023: Köniz
- * Club domestic league appearances and goals as of 10 April 2020 ‡ National team caps and goals as of 22 June 2014

Nijaz Lena (Macedonian: Нијаз Лена; born 25 June 1986) is a Macedonian professional footballer who plays as a midfielder for FC Struga. He also holds Albanian passport.

== Club career ==
=== Flamurtari Vlorë ===
On 20 February 2013, Lena recorded his 100th appearance with Flamurtari in all competitions during the 2–3 away win against Bylis Ballsh, match valid for the Group B of 2012–13 Albanian Cup.

In July 2013, Lena signed a new one-year deal with the club, keeping him at the club until 2014.

On 18 May 2014, Lena won his first trophy with Flamurtari, the Albanian Cup, where played as a starter as Flamurtari prevail 1–0 over Kukësi in the final held at Qemal Stafa Stadium.

In June 2014, due to his international duties, Lena missed pre-season preparations for the 2014–15 season.

It was reported that Lena left the team after refusing to be a backup for the new signing Nderim Nexhipi. This report was strengthened by Lena itself, who refused to travel with the team to Slovenia, for pre-season preparations. He extended his contract with Flamurtari Vlorë for another season, however, on 23 August 2015.

On 5 January 2016, Lena eventually left the team after six years, which was confirmed by Lena itself on his Facebook profile.

=== Teuta Durrës ===
On 15 January 2016, Lena signed a contract until the end of 2015–16 season with Teuta Durrës, joined former Flamurtari boss Magani. He was presented four days later, where he was assigned the vacant number 10.

His Teuta Durrës debut came on 23 January 2016 during the first leg of 2015–16 Albanian Cup quarter-final clash against Kukësi, where he appeared as a second-half substitute for Eri Lamçja. He made his league debut eight days later against his former club Flamurtari Vlorë in a 1–0 away loss, playing over 75 minutes. Since that, Lena was able to establish himself in the starting lineup, helping the club in its bid to achieve a European spot for the next season. He scored his first goal on 8 May against Skënderbeu Korçë with a penalty kick, with a Panenka style penalty, in an eventual 1–1 home draw.

Lena ended the 2015–16 season by making 20 appearances between league and cup, scoring once in the process, as Teuta Durrës clinched the fourth spot to return in the European competitions for the 2016–17 season. On 30 June, Lena made his European debut for the club by playing 65 minutes in the 1–0 home defeat to Kairat in the Europa League first qualifying round. In the returning leg one week later, Lena played full-90 minutes as Teuta was humbled 5–0 at Central Stadium.

On 2 August, Lena decided to part ways with the club after not finding a way for the new deal.

=== Kukësi ===
On 3 August 2016, Lena signed a one-year contract with Kukësi as a free agent, rejoining his former Flamurtari Vlorë boss Ernest Gjoka and was presented on the same day. He was also a target of Vllaznia Shkodër and Laçi. He made his competitive debut on 25 August as a substitute in the 2016 Albanian Supercup against Skënderbeu Korçë which ended in a 3–1 win at Selman Stërmasi Stadium. During the 2016–17 season, Lena played as a starter, making 30 league appearances, 28 as starter, collecting 2415 minutes as Kukësi won their maiden championship.

=== Teuta Durrës return ===
On 5 August 2017, Lena returned to Teuta Durrës after only one season by penning a contract until June 2019. His was given his old squad number 10 and was named the new captain. Lena made his first appearance of the season on 9 September in the opening matchday against Luftëtari Gjirokastër, netting a penalty kick in a 2–1 home win. On 28 December, after a meeting with president Edmond Hasanbelliu, Lena decided to finish his cooperation with Teuta by terminating the contract by mutual consent.

== International career ==
In June 2014, Lena received a call-up for the first time from Macedonia senior team for the friendlies against China. In the first match on 18th, Lena was able to make his debut by playing as a starter before being substituted in 71st minute for Besmir Bojku, as Macedonia lost 2–0.

He won his second cap four days later, playing again as a starter, but this time in a goalless draw.

== Career statistics ==
=== Club ===
As of 22 December 2017

Appearances and goals by club, season and competition
Club	Season	League			Cup		Europe		Other		Total	
Club	Season	Division	Apps	Goals	Apps	Goals	Apps	Goals	Apps	Goals	Apps	Goals
Makedonija	2009–10	Macedonian First Football League	8	2	—		1 (Note: Appearance(s) in UEFA Champions League)	0	—		9	2
Flamurtari Vlorë	2009–10	Albanian Superliga	13	3	—		—		—		13	3
Flamurtari Vlorë	2010–11	Albanian Superliga	30	3	—		—		—		30	3
Flamurtari Vlorë	2011–12	Albanian Superliga	23	4	10	0	4 (Note: Appearance(s) in UEFA Europa League)	0	—		37	4
Flamurtari Vlorë	2012–13	Albanian Superliga	20	4	9	1	2	0	—		31	5
Flamurtari Vlorë	2013–14	Albanian Superliga	28	2	4	0	—		—		32	2
Flamurtari Vlorë	2014–15	Albanian Superliga	21	0	2	0	4	1	1 (Note: Appearance in Albanian Supercup)	0	28	1
Flamurtari Vlorë	2015–16	Albanian Superliga	10	2	3	0	—		—		13	2
Flamurtari Vlorë	Total		145	18	28	1	10	1	1	0	184	20
Teuta Durrës	2015–16	Albanian Superliga	18	1	2	0	—		—		20	1
Teuta Durrës	2015–16	Albanian Superliga	—		—		2	0	—		2	0
Teuta Durrës	Total		18	1	2	0	2	0	—		22	1
Kukësi	2016–17	Albanian Superliga	30	0	3	0	—		1	0	34	0
Kukësi	2017–18	Albanian Superliga	—		—		2	0	—		2	0
Kukësi	Total		30	0	3	0	2	0	1	0	36	0
Teuta Durrës	2017–18	Albanian Superliga	15	2	2	1	—		—		17	3
Career total			216	23	35	2	15	1	2	0	268	26

=== International ===
As of 22 June 2014

Appearances and goals by national team and year
National team	Year	Apps	Goals
Macedonia	2014	2	0
Total		2	0

== Honours ==
Flamurtari Vlorë

- Albanian Cup: 2013–14

Kukësi

- Albanian Superliga: 2016–17
