= Enea Koliçi =

Albanian footballer

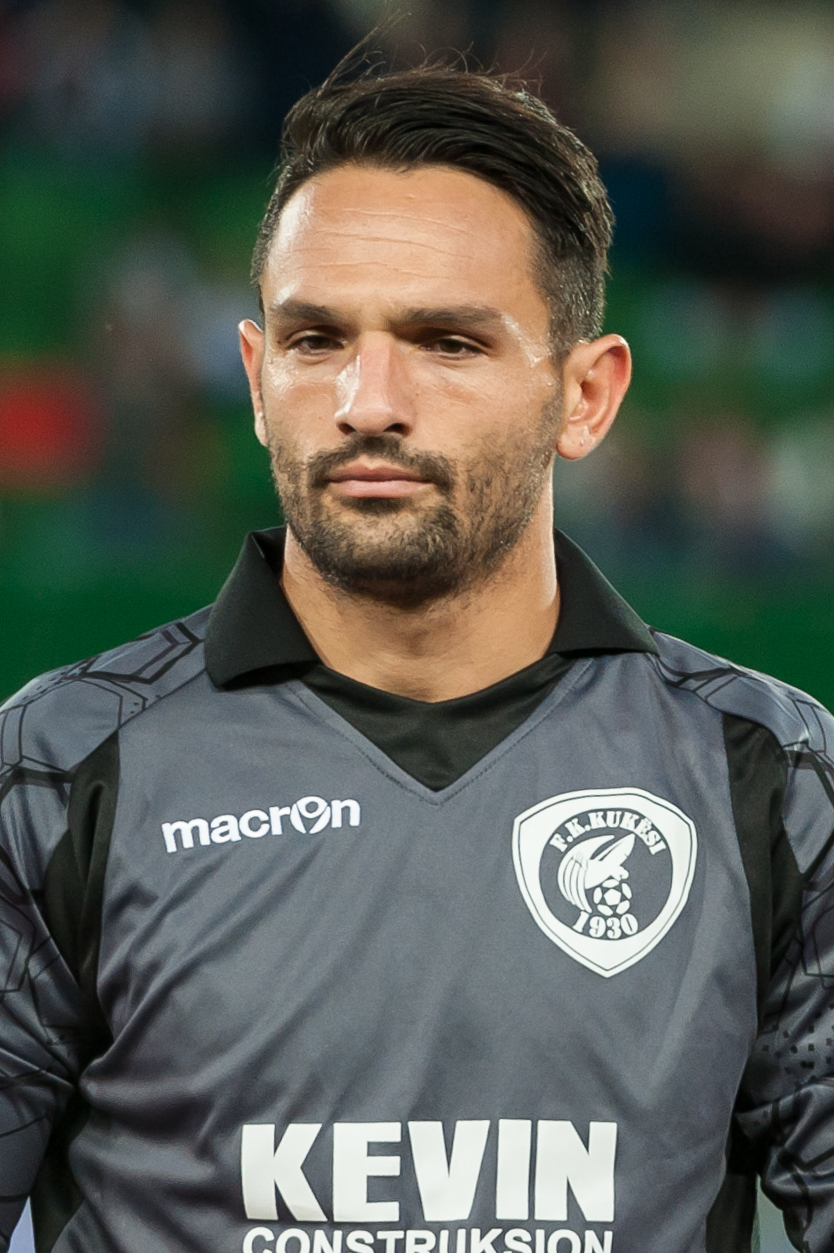
- Kolici in the Europa League in 2016.

Personal information
- Date of birth: 13 February 1986 (age 40)
- Place of birth: Pogradec, Albania
- Height: 1.90 m (6 ft 3 in)
- Position: Goalkeeper

Youth career
- 2004–2006: Iraklis

Senior career*
| Years | Team | Apps | (Gls) |
| 2006–2009 | Iraklis | 0 | (0) |
| 2009–2010 | Olympiacos Volos | 13 | (0) |
| 2010–2011 | Odysseas Kordelio | 22 | (0) |
| 2011–2012 | Panserraikos | 0 | (0) |
| 2012–2013 | Flamurtari Vlorë | 32 | (0) |
| 2013–2014 | Iraklis | 12 | (0) |
| 2014–2015 | Olympiacos Volos | 8 | (0) |
| 2015–2018 | Kukësi | 91 | (0) |
| 2018–2019 | Flamurtari Vlorë | 32 | (0) |
| 2019–2020 | Skënderbeu Korçë | 26 | (0) |
| 2020–2023 | Gjilani | 100 | (1) |
| 2023–2025 | Ballkani | 49 | (0) |

International career^{‡}
| 2007–2009 | Albania U21 | 12 | (0) |
- * Club domestic league appearances and goals as of 16 February 2025 ‡ National team caps and goals as of 1 August 2013

Enea Koliçi (born 13 February 1986) is an Albanian professional footballer who plays as a goalkeeper.

Koliçi started his career in Iraklis youth squads. He also played for Olympiacos Volos, Odysseas Kordeliou, Panserraikos and Flamurtari Vlorë before returning to Iraklis in the summer of 2013.

He has also been capped with Albania under-21 team.

== Club career ==
=== Early career ===
He began his career with Iraklis and was loaned out to Beta Ethniki club Olympiacos Volos in January 2009. Since January 2010 is playing for Olympiacos Volos after being released from Iraklis Thessaloniki. He was released by Olympiacos Volos in the summer of 2010 and he ended up in the 4th tier club Odysseas Kordeliou. On 10 June 2011, he signed for Panserraikos on a free transfer.

=== Flamurtari Vlorë ===
In January 2012, Koliçi returned to his country and joined Albanian Superliga outfit Flamurtari Vlorë as a free agent, signing until the end of the season. He made his first ever Albanian Superliga appearance on 11 February in the away match against Kamza, keeping a clean sheet as Flamuratri won 1–0. Following the debut, he became first choice in goal and retained his spot until the end of the season, collecting 19 appearances, including 13 in league, as Flamurtari finished 4th in league, qualifying in the 2012–13 UEFA Europa League first qualifying round, and was eliminated in the semi-finals of Albanian Cup by Tirana.

He made his European debut with the team on 5 July 2012 in the first leg against Honvéd. He also played in the returning leg on 12th, as Flamurtari suffered another defeat and was eliminated the aggregate 3–0. Three days later, Koliçi agreed a contract extension, signing until June 2013.

=== Return to Iraklis ===
On 1 August 2013 he signed a two-year contract with Iraklis. He had to wait until 26 January of the following year to make his return debut, where he kept a clean sheet in an away win against Anagennisi Giannitsa.

=== Olympiacos Volos ===
On 24 July 2014 Koliçi signed for Olympiacos Volos. He made his competitive debut on 12 October 2014 in the 0–2 home defeat to Zakynthos. During the course of 2014–15 season, Koliçi shared his spot with Alexandros Kasmeridis and Dimitris Rizos, and finished the season with only 8 league appearances, failing to keep a clean sheet.

=== Kukësi ===
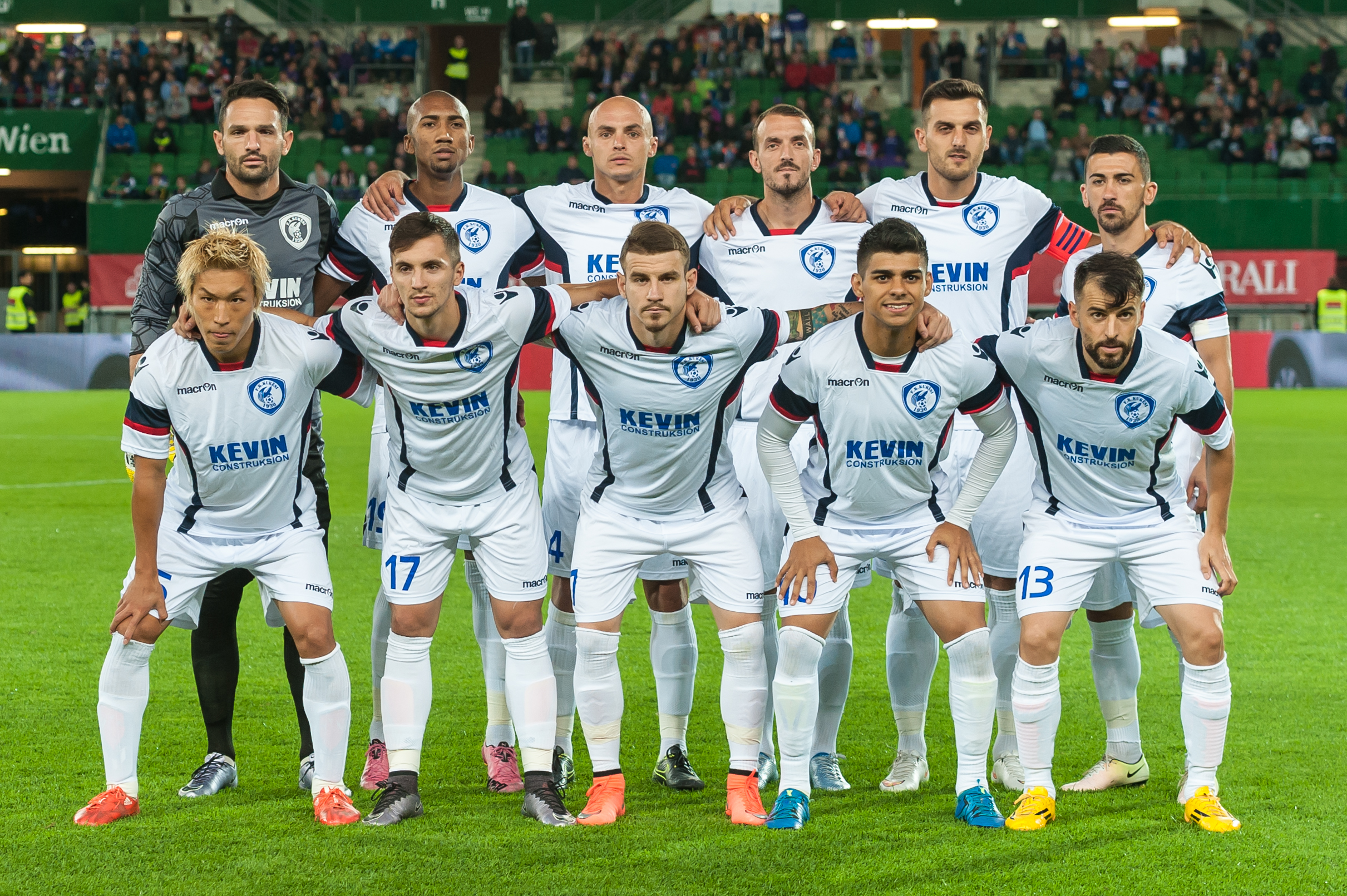
Koliçi lining-up with Kukësi ahead of a Europa League match against Austria Wien.

On 24 August 2015, Koliçi completed a transfer to Albanian Superliga side Kukësi by agreeing a one-year deal after initially refused to be on trial. He spent the first part of the season as Ervis Koçi's backup, and was used only in Albanian Cup where he made his debut in the first round against Naftëtari Kuçovë. His league debut would come later on 5 March of the following year in Kukësi's defeat of Vllaznia in Shkodër, entering in the 5th minute in place of injured Koçi. Koliçi retained his spot until the end of the season, making 13 league appearances, in addition 8 in Albanian Cup, including one in final where Kukësi defeated Laçi on penalties.

Koliçi started his second Kukësi season on 30 June 2016 in first leg of UEFA Europa League first qualifying round against Rudar which ended in a 1–1 home draw. He kept a clean sheet in the returning leg as Kukësi progressed to the second round with the 2–1 aggregate. Kukësi then was eliminated in the second round by Austria Wien with the aggregate 5–1. On 5 August 2016, he extended his contract for another year. Later on 24 August, Koliçi begun the domestic season by playing in the 2016 Albanian Supercup against Skënderbeu Korçë, where Kukësi emerged victorious at Selman Stërmasi Stadium, aiding the club to win its first ever Albanian Supercup trophy.

Koliçi played 28 league games during the 2017–18 season; he lost his starting place to Stivi Frashëri in mid-March 2018 following the arrival of manager Peter Pacult. He played his 100th Albanian Superliga match on 28 February in the 2–2 home draw against Skënderbeu Korçë.

On 6 July 2017, Koliçi was not included in the UEFA Champions League squad for the first qualifying round tie versus Malta's Valletta. The following day he announced to have terminated the contract with the club and becoming a free agent.

=== Return to Flamurtari Vlorë ===
On 26 July 2018, Koliçi signed a one-year contract with Flamurtari, returning in Vlorë after five years.

=== Skënderbeu Korçë ===
In August 2019, Koliçi joined Skënderbeu Korçë as a free agent on a contract for the 2019–20 season. He made his debut in the opening championship week against his former side Flamurtari Vlorë on 24 August, keeping a clean-sheet in a 1–0 win at home.

=== Gjilani ===
On 29 July 2020, Koliçi joined Football Superleague of Kosovo side Gjilani, on a two-year contract.

=== Ballkani ===
In July 2023, Koliçi joined Football Superleague of Kosovo side Ballkani.

== International career ==
Koliçi has made 12 appearances for Albania under-21 squad. He was part of the team in the qualifiers of 2009 UEFA European Under-21 Championship. After remaining on the bench in the first two matches, Koliçi was handed his debut on 8 September 2007 in the match against Croatia where he kept a clean sheet in an eventual 1–0 win. He second appearance came in the next match against Azerbaijan as Albania didn't get more than a 1–1 draw at Baku. Koliçi finished the campaign by making 7 appearances as Albania finished Group 1 in 4th position, failing thus to qualify for the main tournament.

He received his first senior call up at Albania senior team for the friendly match against Georgia on 10 June 2009, where he featured in the game but was an unused substitute for the entire match.

Koliçi returned to the national team after eight years in October 2017 to replace the injured Thomas Strakosha for the final 2018 FIFA World Cup qualification matches versus Spain and Italy. He was placed as the third goalkeeper and remained on the bench in both matches.

== Career statistics ==
=== Club ===
As of 24 August 2019

Club statistics
| Club | Season | League | | | Cup | | Europe | | Other | | Total | |
| Club | Season | Division | Apps | Goals | Apps | Goals | Apps | Goals | Apps | Goals | Apps | Goals |
|---|---|---|---|---|---|---|---|---|---|---|---|---|
| Iraklis | 2006–07 | Super League Greece | 0 | 0 | — | | — | | — | | 0 | 0 |
| Iraklis | 2007–08 | Super League Greece | — | | — | | — | | — | | — | |
| Iraklis | 2008–09 | Super League Greece | — | | — | | — | | — | | — | |
| Iraklis | Total | | 0 | 0 | — | | — | | — | | 0 | 0 |
| Olympiacos Volos | 2008–09 | Beta Ethniki | 4 | 0 | — | | — | | — | | 4 | 0 |
| Olympiacos Volos | 2009–10 | Beta Ethniki | 9 | 0 | 1 | 0 | — | | — | | 10 | 0 |
| Olympiacos Volos | Total | | 13 | 0 | 1 | 0 | — | | — | | 14 | 0 |
| Odysseas Kordelio | 2010–11 | Delta Ethniki | 22 | 0 | — | | — | | — | | 22 | 0 |
| Panserraikos | 2011–12 | Football League Greece | 0 | 0 | 1 | 0 | — | | — | | 1 | 0 |
| Flamurtari Vlorë | 2011–12 | Albanian Superliga | 13 | 0 | 6 | 0 | — | | — | | 19 | 0 |
| Flamurtari Vlorë | 2012–13 | Albanian Superliga | 19 | 0 | 7 | 0 | 2 (Note: All appearance(s) in UEFA Europa League) | 0 | — | | 28 | 0 |
| Flamurtari Vlorë | Total | | 32 | 0 | 13 | 0 | 2 | 0 | — | | 47 | 0 |
| Iraklis | 2013–14 | Football League Greece | 12 | 0 | 0 | 0 | — | | — | | 12 | 0 |
| Olympiacos Volos | 2014–15 | Football League Greece | 8 | 0 | 4 | 0 | — | | — | | 12 | 0 |
| Kukësi | 2015–16 | Albanian Superliga | 13 | 0 | 8 | 0 | — | | — | | 21 | 0 |
| Kukësi | 2016–17 | Albanian Superliga | 35 | 0 | 0 | 0 | 4 | 0 | 1 (Note: Appearance in Albanian Supercup) | 0 | 40 | 0 |
| Kukësi | 2017–18 | Albanian Superliga | 28 | 0 | 1 | 0 | 2 (Note: All appearance(s) in UEFA Champions League) | 0 | 1 | 0 | 32 | 0 |
| Kukësi | Total | | 77 | 0 | 9 | 0 | 6 | 0 | 2 | 0 | 93 | 0 |
| Kukësi B | 2015–16 | Albanian Second Division | 1 | 0 | — | | — | | — | | 1 | 0 |
| Flamurtari Vlorë | 2018–19 | Albanian Superliga | 32 | 0 | 3 | 0 | — | | — | | 35 | 0 |
| Skënderbeu Korçë | 2019–20 | Albanian Superliga | 1 | 0 | 0 | 0 | — | | — | | 1 | 0 |
| Career total | | | 197 | 0 | 31 | 0 | 8 | 0 | 2 | 0 | 238 | 0 |

== Honours ==
=== Club ===
Kukësi

- Albanian Cup: 2015–16
- Albanian Supercup: 2016
- Albanian Superliga: 2016–17

=== Individual ===
- Albanian Superliga Player of the Month: February 2017
