= Bekim Dema =

Albanian professional footballer

Personal information
- Date of birth: 30 March 1993 (age 33)
- Place of birth: Skopje, Macedonia
- Height: 1.83 m (6 ft 0 in)
- Position: Central midfielder

Youth career
- 2008–2010: Vllaznia
- 2010–2011: FBG Schwerte
- 2011–2012: Vllaznia

Senior career*
Years	Team	Apps	(Gls)
2011–2015	Vllaznia	53	(0)
2015–2016	Skënderbeu	3	(0)
2016–2017	Kukësi	5	(0)
2017	Laçi	3	(0)
2017–2018	Vllaznia	7	(0)
2023	Haringey Borough		

International career
2010–2011	Albania U18	2	(0)
2011–2012	Albania U19	1	(0)
- * Club domestic league appearances and goals

Bekim Dema (born 30 March 1993) is an Albanian former professional footballer who played as a central midfielder.

== Club career ==
=== Early career ===
Dema joined Vllaznia Shkodër's under-17 side in 2008, where he played for two years before leaving to join German youth side FBG Schwerte in 2010, where he remained for a year. In July 2011 he went on a trial with newly promoted Pierwsza Liga side Zawisza Bydgoszcz along with fellow Albanian U19 international Enio Petro. This trial however proved to be unsuccessful and he returned to Albania to join Vllaznia's U19 team in 2011.

Dema left the club on 11 June 2015 as a free agent.

=== Skënderbeu Korçë ===
Dema left Vllaznia Shkodërat the end of the 2014–15 season and on 13 June 2015 joined Albanian Superliga champions Skënderbeu Korçë on a free transfer. Dema failed to make an impact during his spell, and after three league appearances throughout the season, he announced his departure in June 2016.

=== Kukësi ===
On 16 June 2016, Dema joined fellow Albanian Superliga side Kukësi on a one-year deal, and alter flew out to Maribor, Slovenia to link up with the rest of the squad on their summer training camp ahead of Europea League qualifying campaign.

He left the club in the start of January 2017.

== International career ==
Dema has represented Albania at under-18, 19 and 21 levels. He has made only one appearance with the under-19 side, which came on 5 October 2011 in a 1–0 loss to Denmark for the qualifiers of the 2012 UEFA European Under-19 Championship.

== Career statistics ==
=== Club ===
As of 4 November 2017

Club	Season	League			Cup		Europe		Other		Total	
Club	Season	Division	Apps	Goals	Apps	Goals	Apps	Goals	Apps	Goals	Apps	Goals
Vllaznia Shkodër	2011–12	Albanian Superliga	11	0	5	0	—		—		16	0
Vllaznia Shkodër	2012–13	Albanian Superliga	9	0	3	0	—		—		12	0
Vllaznia Shkodër	2013–14	Albanian Superliga	10	0	0	0	—		—		10	0
Vllaznia Shkodër	2014–15	Albanian Superliga	23	0	4	1	—		—		27	1
Vllaznia Shkodër	Total		53	0	12	1	—		—		65	1
Skënderbeu Korçë	2015–16	Albanian Superliga	3	0	4	2	0	0	1 (Note: Appearance in Albanian Supercup)	0	8	2
Kukësi	2016–17	Albanian Superliga	5	0	4	0	2 (Note: All appearance(s) in UEFA Europa League)	0	0	0	11	0
Laçi	2016–17	Albanian Superliga	3	0	1	0	—		—		4	0
Vllaznia Shkodër	2017–18	Albanian Superliga	6	0	0	0	—		—		6	0
Career total			70	0	21	1	2	0	1	0	94	1

== Honours ==
Skënderbeu Korçë

- Albanian Superliga: 2015–16

Kukësi

- Albanian Supercup: 2016
