= Ylli Shameti =

Albanian footballer (born 1984)

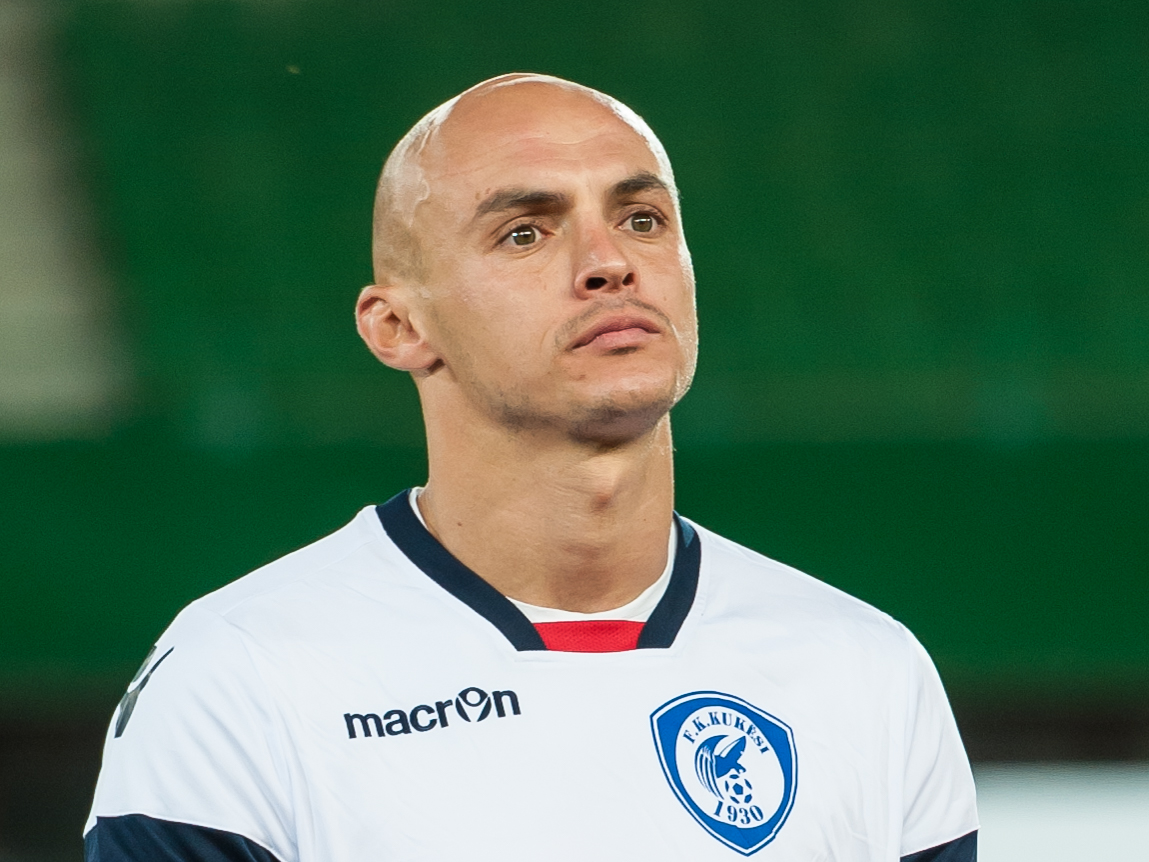
- Shameti with Kukësi in 2016

Personal information
- Date of birth: 7 June 1984 (age 42)
- Place of birth: Gjirokastër, Albania
- Height: 1.87 m (6 ft 2 in)
- Position: Centre-back

Team information
- Current team: Tirana U–17 (assistant)

Youth career
- 2000–2002: KF Luftëtari

Senior career*
| Years | Team | Apps | (Gls) |
| 2002–2007 | KF Luftëtari | 77 | (2) |
| 2007–2008 | Kastrioti | 24 | (3) |
| 2008–2009 | Shkumbini | 28 | (0) |
| 2009–2010 | Kastrioti | 38 | (2) |
| 2010–2011 | Besa | 14 | (1) |
| 2011–2012 | Tomori | 19 | (3) |
| 2012–2013 | KF Luftëtari | 11 | (0) |
| 2013–2019 | Kukësi | 143 | (9) |
| 2019–2020 | Gjilani | 0 | (0) |
| Total | | 354 | (20) |

International career
| 2002–2003 | Albania U19 | 3 | (0) |

Managerial career
- 2022–2023: Kukësi (assistant)
- 2023: Dinamo City (assistant)
- 2023–: Tirana U–17 (assistant)
- * Club domestic league appearances and goals

Ylli Shameti (born 7 June 1984) is an Albanian professional football manager and former player who is the assistant manager of club Tirana U–17.

== Club career ==
=== Early career ===
Born in Gjirokastër, Shameti began his football career with local club Luftëtari in 2000, where he was eventually promoted to the first team in 2002 at the age of 18 where he made his professional debut in the Albanian First Division. In his debut season he helped his club finish in 2nd place in Group B3 of the competition, earning them a place in the new format of the following season's First Division, where Luftëtari managed to retain their First Division despite being in a relegation battle for the majority of the season.

During the 2004–05 season, Shameti helped his side avoid the relegation battle and finish in mid table, before going on to clinch the final promotion place the following campaign. In his debut season in the Albanian Superliga managed to score his first professional goal, which came on 16 December 2006 in a 2–1 win over Teuta Durrës, where he scored the winning goal in the 72nd minute.

Despite being unable to help his side avoid relegation following a tight relegation battle, Shameti's performances throughout the campaign resulted in interest from other Superliga sides for his signature, and he ultimately signed for Kastrioti Krujë ahead of the 2007–08 season.

=== Luftëtari Gjirokastër ===
In July 2012, Shameti signed a one-year contract with his first club Luftëtari Gjirokastër. He started the season on 26 August 2012 by playing the entire match of a goalless draw versus newly promoted side Kukësi. On 20 November 2012, he was injured in training and was forced to remain sidelined for more than two months. Shameti returned in action on 10 February of the following by playing in the 3–1 home loss to Kukësi. Shameti concluded the 2012–13 season by playing only 11 matches, all of them in league as Luftëtari was relegated.

=== Kukësi ===
On 30 August 2013, Shameti officially joined Kukësi on a free transfer by signing a one-year deal with an option of a further one. He was presented on the same day, where he was given the vacant squad number 4 for the 2013–14 season.

On 30 July 2014, Shameti agreed a contract extension with Kukësi by signing a one-year contract.

On 4 August 2016, Shameti signed a new two-year contract along with his team-mate Besar Musolli, despite the interest shown by various Albanian Superliga sides for his services.

== International career ==
Shameti has made three international appearances for Albania U19 between 2002 and 2003, making his debut on 4 September 2002 against Russia in the first qualifying round of UEFA European Under-19 Championship.

== Career statistics ==
As of 25 July 2018

Club statistics
| Club | Season | League | | | Cup | | Europe | | Other | | Total | |
| Club | Season | Division | Apps | Goals | Apps | Goals | Apps | Goals | Apps | Goals | Apps | Goals |
|---|---|---|---|---|---|---|---|---|---|---|---|---|
| Luftëtari Gjirokastër | 2006–07 | Albanian Superliga | 18 | 1 | 0 | 0 | — | | — | | 18 | 1 |
| Kastrioti Krujë | 2007–08 | Albanian Superliga | 24 | 3 | 0 | 0 | — | | — | | 24 | 3 |
| Shkumbini Peqin | 2008–09 | Albanian Superliga | 29 | 0 | 6 | 1 | — | | — | | 35 | 1 |
| Kastrioti Krujë | 2009–10 | Albanian Superliga | 29 | 1 | 1 | 0 | — | | — | | 13 | 3 |
| Kastrioti Krujë | 2010–11 | Albanian Superliga | 9 | 1 | 0 | 0 | — | | — | | 30 | 3 |
| Kastrioti Krujë | Total | | 38 | 2 | 1 | 0 | — | | — | | 39 | 2 |
| Besa Kavajë | 2010–11 | Albanian Superliga | 14 | 1 | 4 | 1 | — | | — | | 18 | 2 |
| Tomori Berat | 2011–12 | Albanian Superliga | 19 | 3 | 1 | 0 | — | | — | | 20 | 3 |
| Luftëtari Gjirokastër | 2012–13 | Albanian Superliga | 11 | 0 | 0 | 0 | — | | — | | 11 | 0 |
| Kukësi | 2013–14 | Albanian Superliga | 18 | 2 | 7 | 0 | — | | — | | 25 | 2 |
| Kukësi | 2014–15 | Albanian Superliga | 29 | 1 | 7 | 2 | 2 (Note: All appearance(s) in UEFA Europa League) | 0 | — | | 38 | 3 |
| Kukësi | 2015–16 | Albanian Superliga | 26 | 1 | 5 | 3 | 2 | 0 | — | | 33 | 4 |
| Kukësi | 2016–17 | Albanian Superliga | 26 | 1 | 2 | 0 | 4 | 0 | 1 (Note: All appearance(s) in Albanian Supercup) | 0 | 33 | 4 |
| Kukësi | 2017–18 | Albanian Superliga | 23 | 2 | 2 | 0 | 2 (Note: All appearance(s) in UEFA Champions League) | 0 | 1 | 0 | 28 | 2 |
| Kukësi | 2018–19 | Albanian Superliga | 0 | 0 | 0 | 0 | 3 | 0 | — | | 3 | 0 |
| Kukësi | Total | | 122 | 7 | 23 | 5 | 13 | 0 | 2 | 0 | 160 | 12 |
| Career total | | | 275 | 14 | 35 | 7 | 13 | 0 | 2 | 0 | 325 | 21 |

== Honours ==
Kukësi

- Albanian Superliga: 2016–17
- Albanian Cup: 2015–16
- Albanian Supercup: 2016
