= Albi Alla =

Albanian footballer

Personal information
- Date of birth: 1 February 1993 (age 33)
- Place of birth: Pogradec, Albania
- Height: 1.88 m (6 ft 2 in)
- Position: Centre-back

Team information
- Current team: Flamurtari
- Number: 6

Youth career
- 2009–2013: Ergotelis

Senior career*
Years	Team	Apps	(Gls)
2013–2015	Ergotelis	8	(0)
2013–2014	→ Fokikos (loan)	23	(0)
2014–2015	→ Panachaiki (loan)	28	(0)
2016	Skënderbeu	0	(0)
2016	→ Bylis (loan)	16	(0)
2016–2018	Kukësi	51	(0)
2018–2019	Flamurtari	12	(1)
2019	Yanbian Funde	0	(0)
2019–2022	Shaanxi Chang'an Athletic	34	(3)
2021	→ Zibo Cuju (loan)	6	(1)
2021	→ Nanjing City (loan)	15	(0)
2022–2023	Laçi	15	(0)
2023–2024	Teuta	4	(0)
2024–	Flamurtari	9	(0)

International career^{‡}
2017–	Albania	1	(0)
- * Club domestic league appearances and goals as of 10 November 2024 ‡ National team caps and goals as of 28 March 2017

Albi Alla (born 1 February 1993) is an Albanian professional footballer who plays as a centre-back for Albanian Superliga side Flamurtari and the Albania national team.

== Club career ==
=== Ergotelis and loans ===
Alla began his football career in the youth teams of his local side Ergotelis and signed his first professional contract with the club, on 28 January 2013. Six months later, on 24 August 2013 and after having made no appearances for his club, Alla was loaned out to Fokikos and made his professional debut playing the full 120 minutes in a Cup match against Acharnaikos on 15 September 2013. Alla recorded a total of 26 appearances for the club in the 2013−14 season.

On 7 August 2014, Alla signed a contract with Football League side Panachaiki, again on loan from Ergotelis, with a buyout option. Although Alla earned a place in the club's starting XI lineup, events took a surprising turn after a league match against Olympiacos Volos on 7 June 2015, when Panachaiki owner at the time Alexis Kougias decided to release Alla from his contract, and thus return the player to Ergotelis. Alla played a total of 33 matches for Panachaiki, scoring one goal against Paniliakos on 28 August 2014, in a match for the Greek Cup's first round.

After two consecutive loans, Alla made his debut with Ergotelis in the 2015−2016 season in a league match against Lamia on 11 October 2015. As Ergotelis faced financial issues which ultimately forced the club to withdraw from professional competitions in January 2016, Alla was one of only 17 players who remained in the club's roster until the end.

=== Skënderbeu Korçë ===
Alla joined Albanian club Skënderbeu Korçë in January 2016 after being released by Ergotelis, signing until June 2018. Immediately after joining the club, Alla was sent on loan at fellow top flight side Bylis Ballsh until the end of the season. Alla made his first Albanian Superliga appearance on 31 January in the 3–0 loss to Kukësi. He amassed 16 league matches during his loan spell with the club, collecting 1398 minutes as Bylis suffered relegation.

=== Kukësi ===
Alla was released from his contract with Skënderbeu Korçë in the summer of 2016 and signed for Albanian Cup winners Kukësi. He made his official debut for the club on 24 August 2016, playing in the 2016 Albanian Supercup against his former club Skënderbeu Korçë, as Kukësi won the game 3–1 for the trophy in Alla's career.

On 28 June 2017, Alla completed a transfer to Greek club Athlitiki Enosi Larissa by signing a three-year contract. However the transfer was canceled as the player was still on contract with Kukësi and consequently was returned to the club.

Alla returned to the club in mid-August 2017 and eventually signed a one-year contract with an option of a further one.

=== Flamurtari Vlorë ===
On 20 August 2018, Alla agreed personal terms and joined Flamurtari Vlorë on a contract until the end of the 2018–19 season. He made his debut six days later against his former team Kukësi, netting the match's only goal with a header, recording his first ever Albanian Superliga goal. He was also named Man of the Match. It was also's Flamurtari second ever win against Kukësi, and the first since October 2013.

=== China ===
In February 2019, Alla transferred to China League One side Yanbian. The team was disqualified from the league shortly after, and Alla moved to another Chinese club Shaanxi Chang'an Athletic.

== International career ==
Alla burst on to international scene in 2017 when he received his first international call-up by manager Gianni De Biasi for the 2018 FIFA World Cup qualification match against Italy on 24 March and the friendly against Bosnia and Herzegovina three days later as a replacement for defenders Mërgim Mavraj and Berat Djimsiti.

Alla earned his first international cap in the second match against Bosnia and Herzegovina, playing in the first half as the match was lost 2–1 at Elbasan Arena.

== Personal life ==
Alla was born in Pogradec, Albania and moved to Greece along with his family when he was three years old.

== Career statistics ==
=== Club ===
As of match played 10 November 2024.

Appearances and goals by club, season and competition
Club	Season	League			Cup		Continental (Note: Including continental competitions, such as UEFA Champions League and UEFA Europa League)		Other (Note: Including other competitions, such as Albanian Supercup)		Total	
Club	Season	Division	Apps	Goals	Apps	Goals	Apps	Goals	Apps	Goals	Apps	Goals
Ergotelis	2012–13	Football League (Greece)	0	0	—		—		—		0	0
Ergotelis	2015–16	Football League (Greece)	8	0	4	0	—		—		12	0
Ergotelis	Total		8	0	4	0	—		—		12	0
Fokikos (loan)	2013–14	Football League (Greece)	23	0	3	0	—		—		26	0
Panachaiki (loan)	2014–15	Football League (Greece)	28	0	5	1	—		—		33	1
Bylis Ballsh (loan)	2015–16	Albanian Superliga	16	0	—		—		—		16	0
Kukësi	2016–17	Albanian Superliga	30	0	0	0	0	0	1	0	31	0
Kukësi	2017–18	Albanian Superliga	21	0	4	0	—		—		25	0
Kukësi	Total		51	0	4	0	0	0	1	0	56	0
Flamurtari	2018–19	Albanian Superliga	12	1	1	0	4	0	—		17	1
Shaanxi Chang'an Athletic	2019	China League One	21	2	1	0	—		—		22	2
Shaanxi Chang'an Athletic	2020	China League One	13	1	—		—		—		13	1
Shaanxi Chang'an Athletic	Total		34	3	1	0	—		—		35	3
Zibo Cuju (loan)	2021	China League One	6	1	0	0	—		—		6	1
Nanjing City (loan)	2021	China League One	15	0	1	0	—		—		16	0
KF Laçi	2022–23	Albanian Superliga	15	0	0	0	—		—		15	0
Teuta	2023–24	Albanian Superliga	4	0	0	0	—		—		4	0
Flamurtari	2024–25	Albanian Second League	9	0	1	0	—		—		10	0
Career total			221	5	20	1	4	0	1	0	246	6

=== International ===
As of 28 March 2017

Appearances and goals by national team and year
National team	Year	Apps	Goals
Albania	2017	1	0
Total		1	0

== Honours ==
Kukësi

- Albanian Supercup: 2016
- Albanian Superliga: 2016–17
