= 2014 Albanian Cup final =

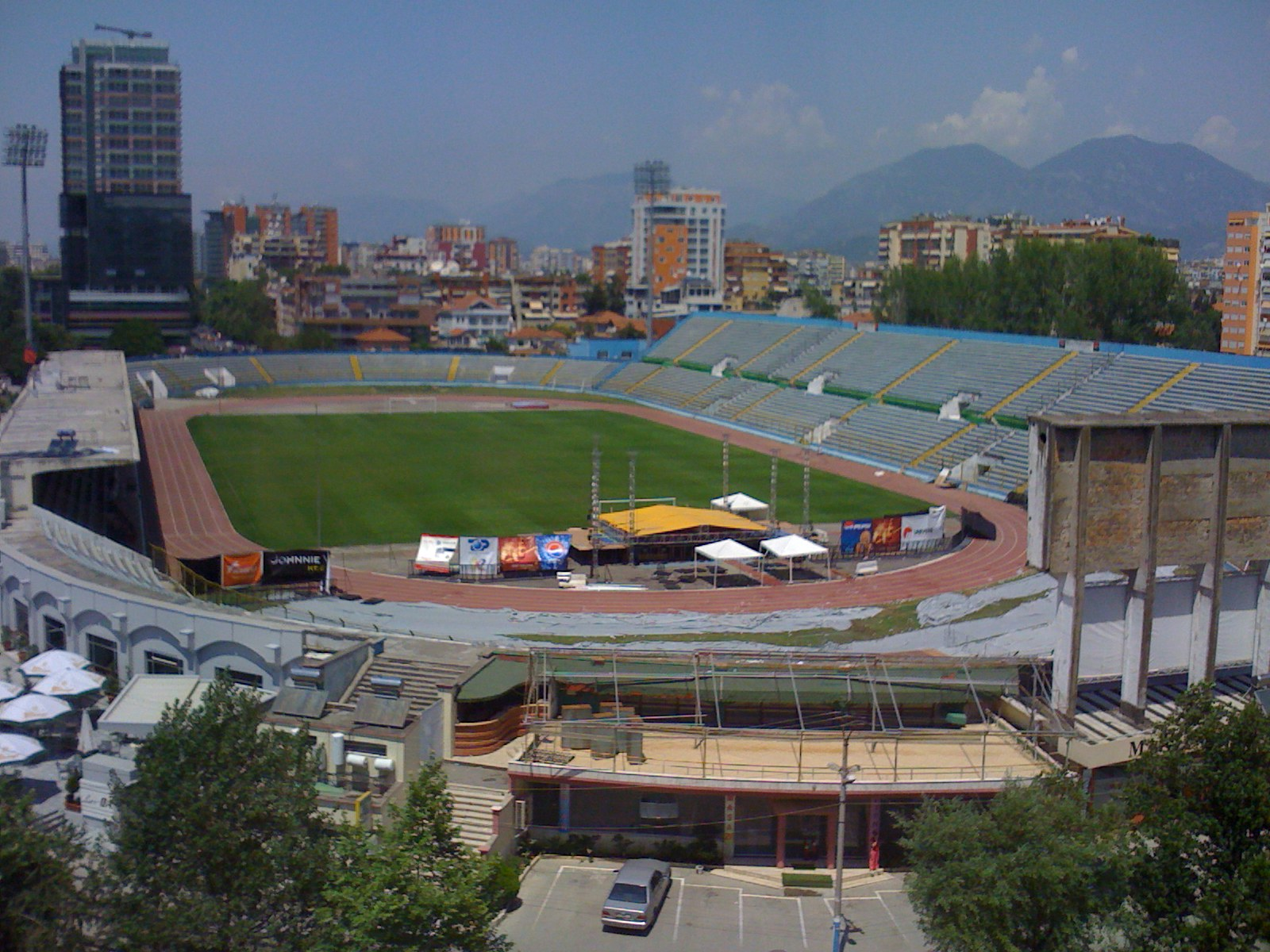
- The Qemal Stafa Stadium in Tirana held the final
- Event: 2013–14 Albanian Cup
Flamurtari	Kukësi
1	0
- Date: 18 May 2014
- Venue: Qemal Stafa Stadium, Tirana
- Man of the Match: Arbër Abilaliaj
- Referee: Enea Jorgji
- Attendance: 7,000
- Weather: Sunny; 28 °C (82 °F)

The 2014 Albanian Cup final was a football match played on 18 May 2014 to decide the winner of the 2013–14 Albanian Cup, the 62nd edition of Albania's primary football cup.

The match was between Flamurtari and Kukësi at the Qemal Stafa Stadium in Tirana.

Flamurtari Vlorë won the final 1–0 for their fourth Albanian Cup title.

== Match ==
=== Details ===
18 May 2014
18:00

Flamurtari	1−0	Kukësi
Abilaliaj 44'	Report

Qemal Stafa Stadium, Tirana
Attendance: 7,000
Referee: Enea Jorgji
