= Rrahman Hallaçi =

Albanian footballer and coach (born 1983)

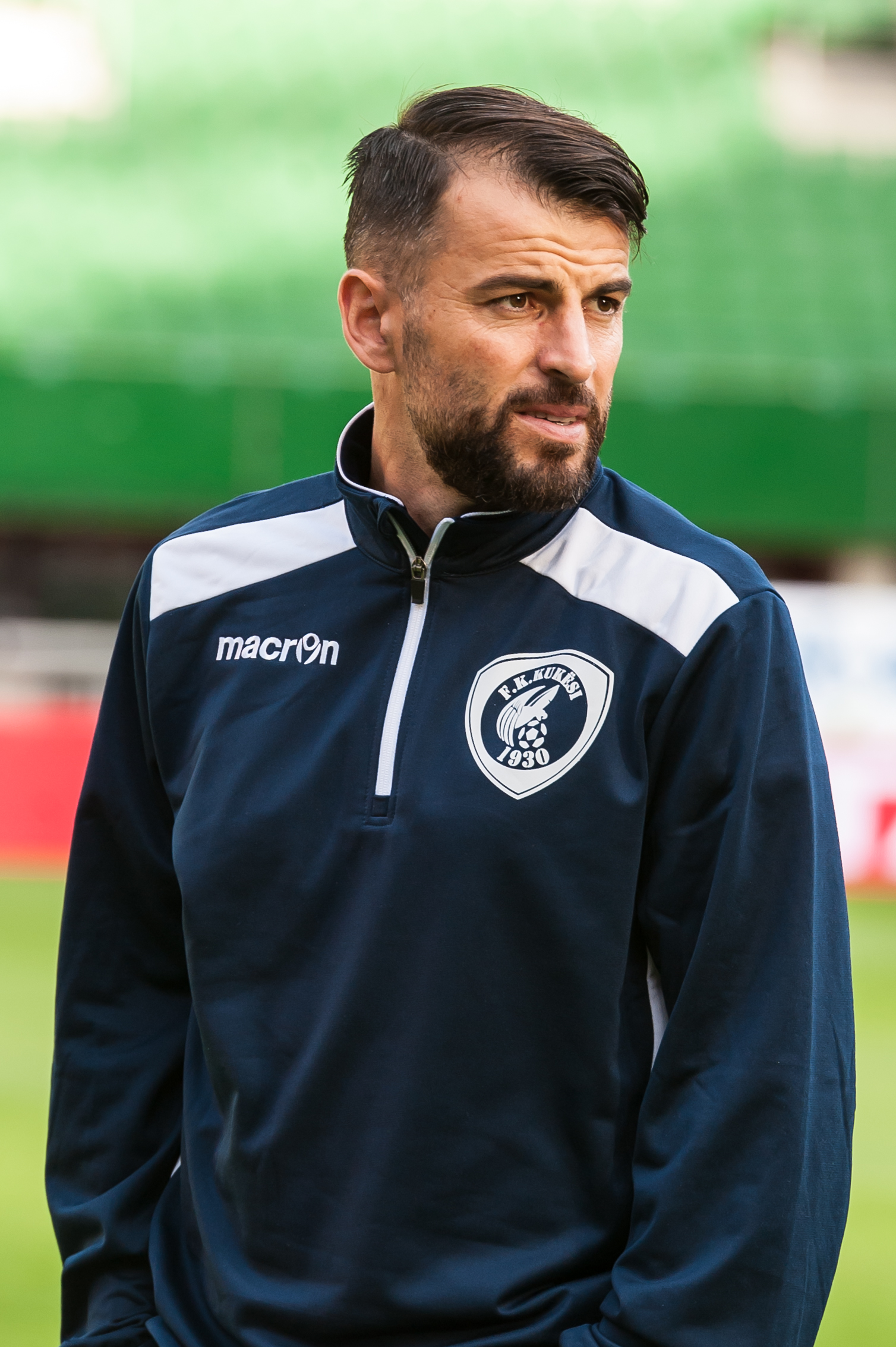
- Hallaçi with Kukësi in 2016

Personal information
- Date of birth: 12 November 1983 (age 42)
- Place of birth: Kukës, Albania
- Height: 1.79 m (5 ft 10 in)
- Position: Right-back

Youth career
- 1995–1997: Kukësi
- 1997–2000: Shkëndija

Senior career*
Years	Team	Apps	(Gls)
2002–2008	Partizani Tirana	180	(6)
2009	Elbasani	15	(0)
2009–2010	Vllaznia	13	(0)
2010	Partizani Tirana	11	(0)
2010–2011	Tirana	4	(0)
2011–2012	Kamza	25	(0)
2012–2017	Kukësi	162	(0)
Total		410	(6)

International career
2002–2004	Albania U21	8	(0)

Managerial career
- 2018–2020: Kukësi (assistant)
- 2020–2021: Kukësi (caretaker)
- 2022–2023: Kukësi
- 2023–2024: Iliria
- 2024–2025: Gramshi W
- 2025–: Sopoti
- * Club domestic league appearances and goals

Rrahman Hallaçi (born 12 November 1983) is an Albanian professional football coach and former player.

== Club career ==
=== Partizani Tirana ===
Hallaçi started his professional career with Partizani Tirana in 2002. He won his first career silverware on 19 May 2004, the Albanian Cup, after the team won 0–2 against Tirana to clinch the cup for a record 15th time. His second trophy came later that year, where Partizani won again against Tirana to win the Albanian Supercup.

He left the club after eight years in the winter of 2008 after falling out with president Albert Xhani due to unpaid wages.

=== Elbasani ===
On 9 January 2009, Hallaçi completed a transfer to fellow top flight side Elbasani by signing a contract until the end of the season. He made 15 league appearances and two cup appearances for a total of 17 appearances; as Elbasani was relegated to Albanian First Division and was eliminated in the quarter-finals of Albanian Cup.

=== Vllaznia Shkodër ===
Hallaçi agreed personal terms and joined Vllaznia Shkodër on 25 June 2009 as a free agent. He there joined his ex-Partizani manager Hasan Lika who requested his transfer. He was given squad number 17 and was included in the UEFA Europa League squad.

Hallaçi made his competitive debut on 2 July in the competition's first leg of first qualifying round versus Sligo Rovers as Vllaznia won 1–2 at The Showgrounds. He also played in the returning leg to help the team earn a 1–1 draw which ensured progression to second qualifying round.

Hallaçi also played in both matches of second qualifying round as Vllaznia was eliminated 0–8 on aggregate by Rapid Wien. He finished his European campaign with 4 matches.

=== Partizani Tirana return ===
On 20 January 2010, Hallaçi returned to his first club Partizani Tirana, now competing in Albanian First Division, by penning a contract until the end of the season. During the second part of 2009–10 season he played 11 league matches and Partizani finished 5th in the championship, missing promotion play-offs for only 3 points.

=== Tirana ===
In 2010, Hallaçi signed with Tirana for the 2010–11 season, where he made only four appearances.

=== Kukësi ===
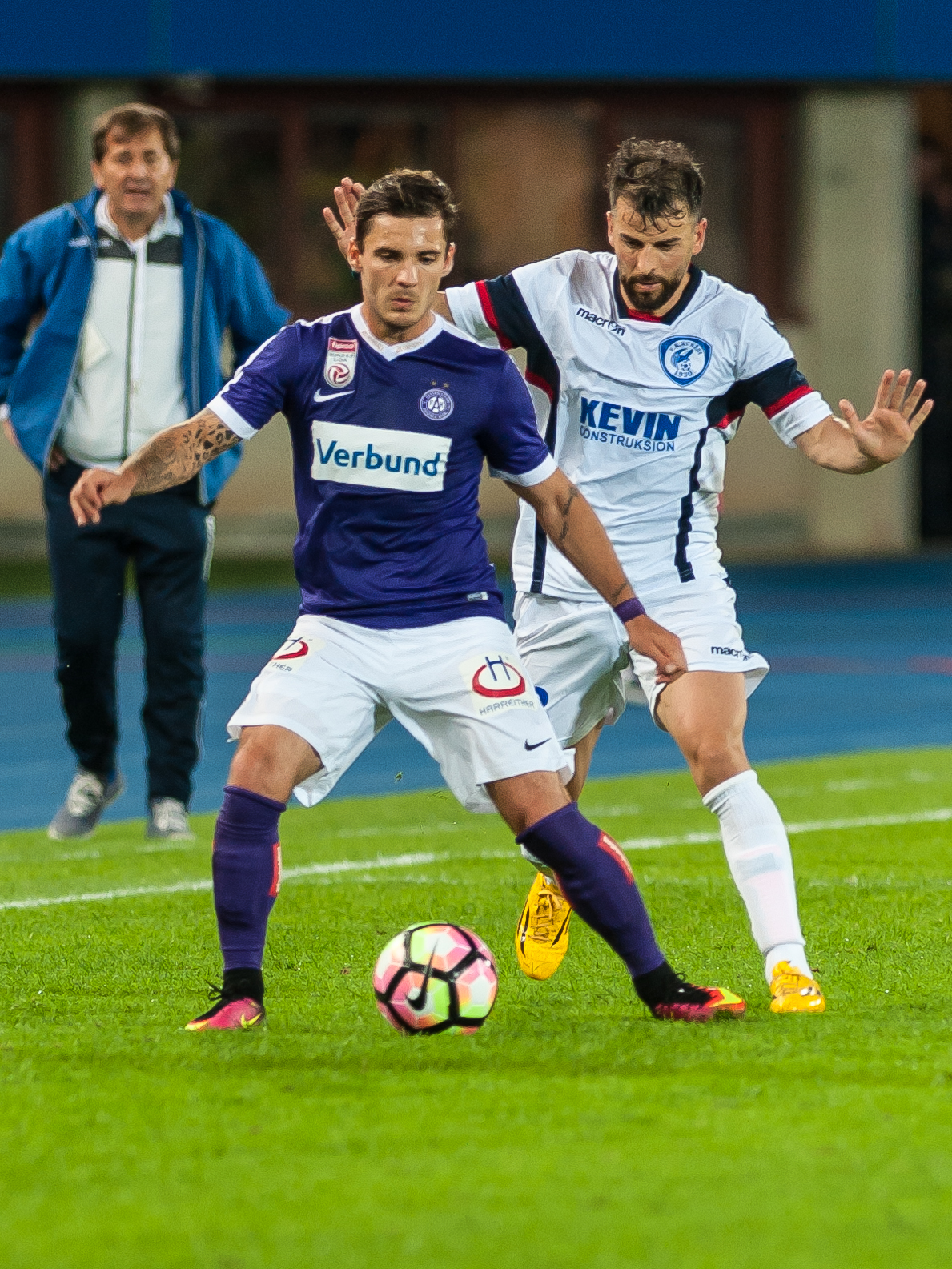
Hallaçi (behind) in action during a Europa League match in 2016.

Hallaçi returned to his boyhood club Kukësi on 7 July 2012 by signing a one-year contract in club's first ever top flight season. His transfer was strongly required by the fans. He was named the team captain and made his competitive debut on 27 August by playing as starter in the club's first ever top flight match, a goalless home draw versus Luftëtari Gjirokastër. Hallaçi's first cup appearance for Kukësi occurred on 24 October in the first leg of second round against Tirana which ended in a historic 4–0 win. He also played in the returning leg as Kukësi lost 2–3 but progressed 6–3 on aggregate. Hallaçi finished in his season in Kukës by making 34 appearances between league and cup, as Kukësi finished runner-up to Skënderbeu in championship and was eliminated in the semi-finals of cup.

In the summer of 2013, Hallaçi was part of Kukësi's squad that reached the play-off round of UEFA Europa League. He played 7 matches, collecting 630 minutes as the team eliminated Flora in the first round, Sarajevo in the second round and Metalurh Donetsk in the third round before being eliminated by Süper Lig outfit Trabzonspor in the play-off. They however become the first Albanian club to reach play-off of an UEFA club competition.

On 31 August 2013, he agreed a new contract, signing until June 2014 with an option of a further one. In October 2013, Hallaçi gave up his duties by handing his captaincy, making Progni the club's captain for the remainder of the season. During the 2013–14 season Hallaçi played a personal best 46 matches in all competitions, as Kukësi finished runner-up once again in championship and lost the Albanian cup final to Flamurtari Vlorë. He was also sent-off in the last moments, leaving the team with 9 players, receiving his first ever red-card with Kukësi.

Hallaçi played his 100th match for Kukësi on 24 January 2015 in the 1–2 win at Vllaznia Shkodër.

Hallaçi begun the 2015–16 season by playing in the qualifying rounds of Europa League; he was ever-presented, playing every minute as Kukësi eliminated Torpedo-BelAZ Zhodino in the first qualifying round and against all odds Mladost Podgorica in the second qualifying round. The first leg of the third qualifying round at Qemal Stafa Stadium versus Legia Warsaw was abandoned in 52nd minute where the result was 1–2 after a Legia Warsaw player was hit in the head by an object thrown from the crowd. Following that incident, UEFA awarded Legia Warsaw with a 3–0 win. In the second leg, Kukësi lost again and was eliminated 0–4 on aggregate. With 15 matches in Europa League, Hallaçi become the Kukësi player with most UEFA appearances.

Hallaçi played full-90 minutes in the Albanian Cup final on 22 May 2016 against Laçi; the match subsequently went to extra-time and then penalty shootouts where Hallaçi scored his team's 4th penalty in an eventual 5–3 win. This win constituted his first trophy win at Kukësi. He concluded the 2015–16 season by making 44 appearances in all competitions.

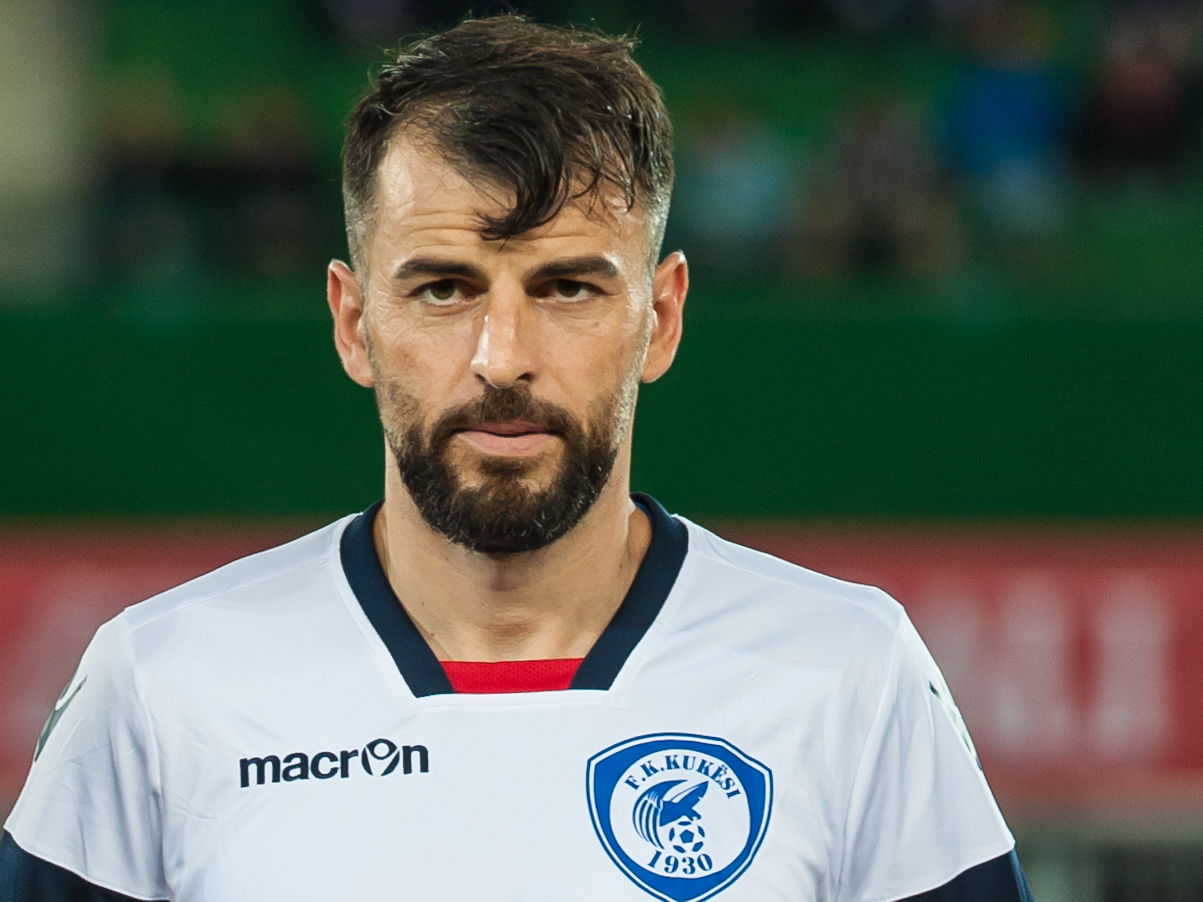
Hallaçi before the start of a Europa League match in 2016.

He scored his first Kukësi goal on 21 July 2016 in the second leg of 2016–17 UEFA Europa League second qualifying round versus Austria Wien. Kukësi lost the match 1–4 and crashed out of competition 1–5 on aggregate.

Following the departure of captain Renato Malota to Partizani Tirana, Hallaçi was renamed the captain of the team.

Hallaçi was one of the most important instruments of Ernest Gjoka's side that lead Kukësi to their maiden Albanian Superliga title during the 2016–17 season. He played 33 matches, missing only one as Kukësi clinched the title on 20 May 2017 after winning on controversial fashion versus Skënderbeu Korçë. It was also his 200th appearance for Kukësi in all competitions. With only four yellow cards, he had the best disciplinary record which earned him "Fair Play" award.

As Hallaçi's side won the league the previous season, he began the 2017–18 campaign playing in the second qualifying round of the Champions League where the team was going to face Sheriff Tiraspol. He made his debut in the competition on 12 July as the team suffered a narrow 0–1 loss at Sheriff Stadium. Kukësi then was eliminated on away goal rule after winning the second match at Elbasan Arena 2–1, thus ending Hallaçi's Champions League season with 2 matches and 180 minutes.

On 8 January 2018, Hallaçi announced his official retirement after being named as Peter Pacult assistant manager for the second part of the season. He finished his career as Kukësi record appearance maker.

== International career ==
He was part of the Albania senior squad during the UEFA Euro 2008 qualifying, but he did not make a debut.

== Managerial career ==
On 3 January 2018, Hallaçi was appointed assistant manager to Peter Pacult for the second part of the 2017–18 season.

== Personal life ==
Hallaçi stated in 2017 that he is a supporter of Italian club Milan.

== Career statistics ==
As of 17 December 2017

Club	Season	League			Cup		Europe		Other		Total	
Club	Season	Division	Apps	Goals	Apps	Goals	Apps	Goals	Apps	Goals	Apps	Goals
Partizani Tirana	2001–02	Albanian Superliga	?	?	0	0	—		—		?	?
Partizani Tirana	2002–03	Albanian Superliga	12	2	0	0	—		—		12	2
Partizani Tirana	2003–04	Albanian Superliga	7	1	0	0	1 (Note: All appearance(s) in UEFA Intertoto Cup)	0	—		8+	1
Partizani Tirana	2004–05	Albanian Superliga	1	0	0	0	4 (Note: All appearance(s) in UEFA Cup)	0	1 (Note: Appearance in Albanian Supercup)	0	6	0
Partizani Tirana	2005–06	Albanian Superliga	23	1	0	0	—		—		23	1
Partizani Tirana	2006–07	Albanian Superliga	27	0	0	0	1	0	—		28	0
Partizani Tirana	2007–08	Albanian Superliga	33	1	0	0	—		—		33	1
Partizani Tirana	2008–09	Albanian Superliga	16	1	2	0	2	1	—		20	1
Partizani Tirana	Total		119+	6	2	0	8	0	—		129+	6
Elbasani	2008–09	Albanian Superliga	15	0	2	0	—		—		17	0
Vllaznia Shkodër	2009–10	Albanian Superliga	13	0	1	0	4 (Note: All appearance(s) in UEFA Europa League)	0	—		18	0
Partizani Tirana	2009–10	Albanian First Division	11	0	0	0	—		—		11	0
Tirana	2010–11	Albanian Superliga	4	0	1	0	—		—		5	0
Kamza	2010–11	Albanian First Division	3	0	0	0	—		—		3	0
Kamza	2011–12	Albanian Superliga	26	0	10	0	—		—		36	0
Kamza	Total		29	0	10	0	—		—		39	0
Kukësi	2012–13	Albanian Superliga	25	0	9	0	—		—		34	0
Kukësi	2013–14	Albanian Superliga	31	0	8	0	7	0	—		46	0
Kukësi	2014–15	Albanian Superliga	34	0	3	0	2	0	—		39	0
Kukësi	2015–16	Albanian Superliga	31	0	7	0	6	0	—		44	0
Kukësi	2016–17	Albanian Superliga	33	0	1	0	4	1	1	0	39	1
Kukësi	2017–18	Albanian Superliga	8	0	2	0	2 (Note: All appearance(s) in UEFA Champions League)	0	1	0	13	0
Kukësi	Total		162	0	30	0	21	1	2	0	215	1
Career total			353	6	45	0	33	1	3	0	434	7

== Honours ==
=== Club ===
Partizani Tirana

- Albanian Cup: 2003–04
- Albanian Supercup: 2004

Kukësi

- Albanian Superliga: 2016–17
- Albanian Cup: 2015–16
- Albanian Supercup: 2016

=== Individual ===
- Albanian Superliga Fair Play Award: 2016–17
