= Drilon Musaj =

Kosovar footballer (born 1994)

Personal information
- Full name: Drilon Musaj
- Date of birth: 11 September 1994 (age 32)
- Place of birth: Gjakova, FR Yugoslavia
- Height: 1.80 m (5 ft 11 in)
- Position: Midfielder

Youth career
- 2010–2012: Trepça'89

Senior career*
Years	Team	Apps	(Gls)
2011–2015	Trepça'89	77	(10)
2015–2017	Laçi	55	(0)
2017–2018	Drita	29	(1)

International career^{‡}
2013	Kosovo U-21	2	(1)
- * Club domestic league appearances and goals as of 20 May 2018 ‡ National team caps and goals as of 12 June 2013

Drilon Musaj (born 11 September 1994) is a Kosovo Albanian professional footballer who last played as a midfielder for Kosovan club Drita.

== Club career ==
Musaj attracted interest from several Albanian Superliga sides including the reigning champions Skënderbeu Korçë, and he went on trial with Laçi during the summer of 2015, where he eventually signed a two-year contract, worth €1,500 per month.

Musaj left the club in July 2017 after two seasons where he collected 66 appearances in all appearances.

On 27 July 2017, Musaj was presented as Drita's newest player after agreeing to personal terms. In the 2017–18 season, he played in 29 league games as Drita won the championship won 20 May 2018 after earning a goalless draw against title challengers Prishtina in the final matchday.

== International career ==
Musaj was one of the founding members of Kosovo U21 side where he was called up in June 2013 for the 2013 Valais Youth Cup held in Switzerland. He appeared as a substitute in Kosovo's first officially recognised fixture versus Ghana, netting in the 73rd minute as the match ended in a 2–2 draw; Kosovo then lost 5–4 on penalty shootouts. He also played in the third-place match against Egypt which finished in an embarrassing 8–0 defeat.

== Personal life ==
Musaj was married in December 2017 to Kaltrina Veseli.

== Honours ==
Drita

- Football Superleague of Kosovo: 2017–18
