= Fjoart Jonuzi =

Albanian footballer

Personal information
- Full name: Fjoart Jonuzi
- Date of birth: 9 July 1996 (age 30)
- Place of birth: Kukës, Albania
- Height: 1.81 m (5 ft 11 in)
- Position: Midfielder

Team information
- Current team: Drenica
- Number: 8

Youth career
- 2005–2014: Kukësi

Senior career*
Years	Team	Apps	(Gls)
2013–2017	Kukësi	18	(0)
2017–2019	Laçi	82	(4)
2019–2020	Gjilani	27	(2)
2020–2023	Vllaznia Shkodër	101	(9)
2023–2024	Tirana	49	(2)
2025–2026	Dinamo City	16	(0)
2026–	Drenica	15	(1)

International career
2014	Albania U-19	1	(0)
2016	Albania U-21	1	(0)
- * Club domestic league appearances and goals as of 22 June 2026

Fjoart Jonuzi (born 9 July 1996 in Kukës) is an Albanian professional footballer who plays for Drenica.

He scored 13 goals for FK Kukësi's under-19 side during the 2013–14 season, and a further 7 in the first half of the 2014–15 season.

== Honours ==
=== Club ===
Dinamo City

- Albanian Cup: 2024–25
