= Rexhep Memini =

Albanian footballer (born 1994)

Personal information
- Date of birth: 10 April 1994 (age 32)
- Place of birth: Durrës, Albania
- Height: 1.86 m (6 ft 1 in)
- Position: Right-back

Team information
- Current team: SV Rotterdam United

Youth career
- 2010–2013: Teuta

Senior career*
Years	Team	Apps	(Gls)
2012–2013	Teuta	5	(0)
2014–2015	Sukthi	20	(3)
2015–2018	Kukësi	21	(0)
2018	Trepça'89	6	(0)
2018–2019	Besa Kavajë	8	(0)
2021–2022	Poortugaal		
2022–2023	SV Rotterdam United		
2023–2024	ODIN '59		
2024–	SV Rotterdam United		

International career
2012–2013	Albania U19	1	(0)
- * Club domestic league appearances and goals as of 17 November 2024

Rexhep Memini (born 4 October 1994) is an Albanian professional footballer who plays as a right-back for SV Rotterdam United.
