= Besar Musolli =

Kosovo Albanian footballer

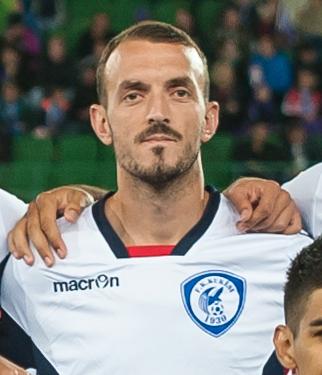
- Musolli with Kukësi in 2016

Personal information
- Date of birth: 28 February 1989 (age 37)
- Place of birth: Podujevë, SFR Yugoslavia (now Kosovo)
- Height: 1.84 m (6 ft 0 in)
- Position: Defensive midfielder

Team information
- Current team: Llapi
- Number: 23

Youth career
- 2005–2009: Prishtina

Senior career*
Years	Team	Apps	(Gls)
2009–2012	Hysi	66	(5)
2012–2020	Kukësi	194	(2)
2020–2023	Gjilani	91	(2)
2023–	Llapi	74	(0)

International career^{‡}
2017	Kosovo	1	(0)
- * Club domestic league appearances and goals as of 1 June 2026 ‡ National team caps and goals as of 6 October 2017

Besar Musolli (born 28 February 1989) is a Kosovan professional footballer who plays as a defensive midfielder for Kosovan club Llapi.

== Club career ==
=== Youth career and Hysi ===
In 2005, Musolli began his career in the youth teams of Prishtina, when he was only 16 years old. In 2009, Musolli starts the career as a professional player to Football Superleague of Kosovo side Hysi, where he played for three years.

=== Kukësi ===
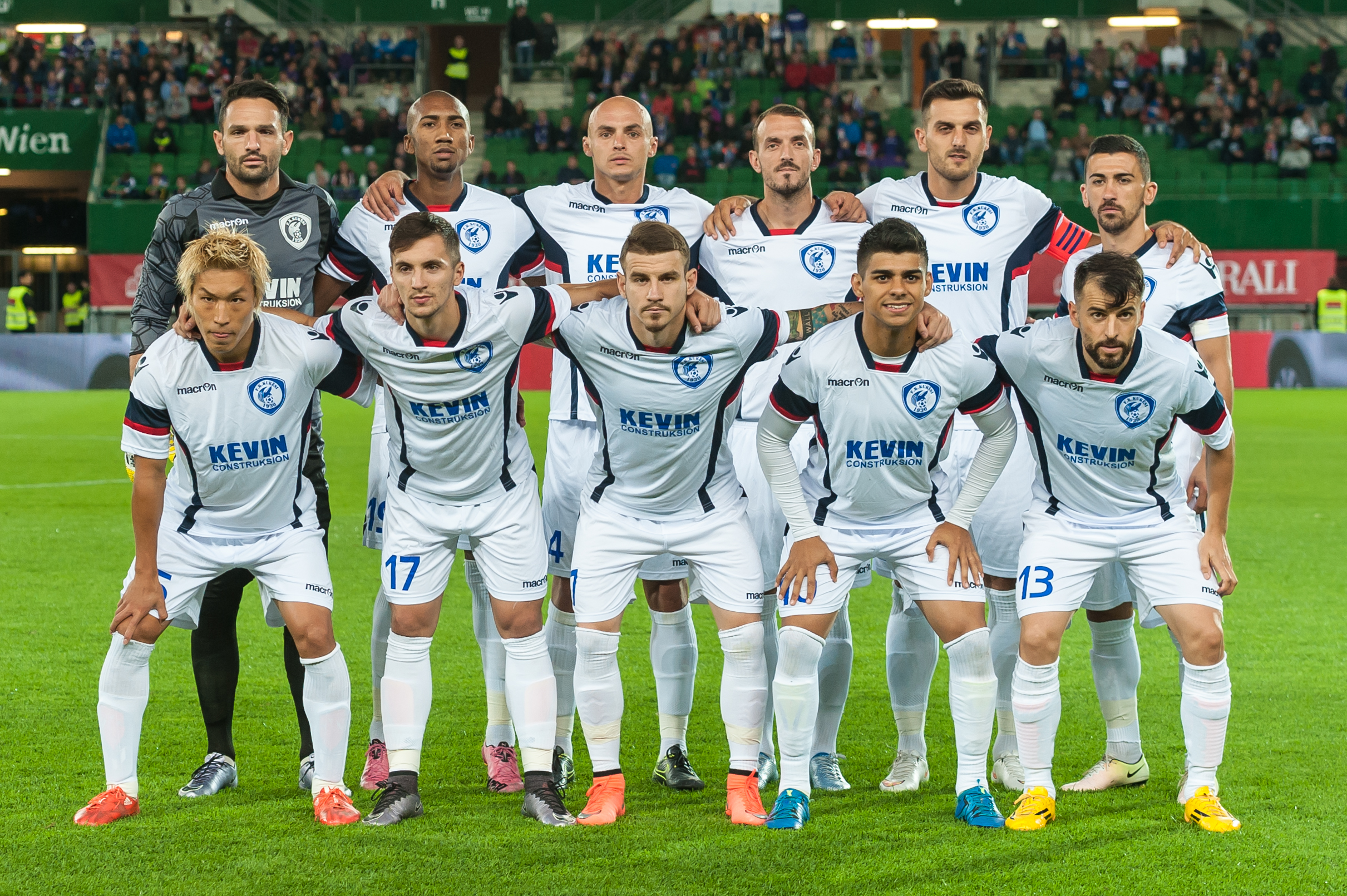
Musolli (up, third from the right), lining up with Kukësi in July 2016.

On 1 July 2012, Musolli completed a transfer to Kategoria Superiore side Kukësi. He made his debut later on 25 August in the club's first ever top flight match against Luftëtari Gjirokastër which ended in a goalless draw.

On 22 May 2016, Musolli played in his second Albanian Cup final match against Laçi and scored the last penalty in the subsequent shoot-out win which secured Kukësi's first ever Albanian Cup trophy.

On 4 August 2016, he agreed a contract extension, signing until June 2017. On 3 January 2018, following the retirement of veteran Rrahman Hallaçi, Musolli was named vice-captain. He made his 150th Kategoria Superiore appearance later on 14 March in the 2–1 away loss to Luftëtari Gjirokastër in the league matchday 25. Five days later, Musolli scored his first-ever league goal for the club in his 200th appearance in all competitions, netting a tap-in in a 2–0 home win over Vllaznia Shkodër. In the post-match interview, when asked about this achievement, Musolli stated: I want to be Francesco Totti of Kukësi.

On 1 August 2018, Musolli played in the 3–0 loss to Qarabağ in the second leg of 2018–19 UEFA Champions League second qualifying round. By doing so, he reached 215 appearances for the club, equaling Rrahman Hallaçi as the player with most appearances for the club. He broke the record in the next match against Torpedo Kutaisi in the first leg of 2018–19 UEFA Europa League third qualifying round.

Musolli suffered a major injury on 15 September during the league match against Teuta Durrës and was replaced at half time. Following the examination, it was confirmed that Musolli has whacked the ligament of his right knee and will remain sidelined for the next six months.

== International career ==
On 5 June 2017, Musolli received his first call-up from Kosovo for the 2018 FIFA World Cup qualification match against Turkey. His debut occurred later on 6 October where he started in another qualifying match against Ukraine.

== Personal life ==
In July 2013, he along with Yll Hoxha were provided with Albanian passport.

== Career statistics ==
=== Club ===
As of 9 August 2018

Appearances and goals by club, season and competition
Club	Season	League			Cup		Continental		Other		Total	
Club	Season	Division	Apps	Goals	Apps	Goals	Apps	Goals	Apps	Goals	Apps	Goals
Kukësi	2012–13	Kategoria Superiore	21	0	8	0	—		—		29	0
Kukësi	2013–14	Kategoria Superiore	14	0	4	0	4 (Note: Appearance(s) in UEFA Europa League)	0	—		22	0
Kukësi	2014–15	Kategoria Superiore	26	0	4	0	2	0	—		32	0
Kukësi	2015–16	Kategoria Superiore	34	0	9	2	4	0	—		37	2
Kukësi	2016–17	Kategoria Superiore	33	0	1	0	4	0	1 (Note: Appearance in Albanian Supercup)	0	39	0
Kukësi	2017–18	Kategoria Superiore	32	1	7	0	2 (Note: Appearance(s) in UEFA Champions League)	0	1	0	42	1
Kukësi	2018–19	Kategoria Superiore	4	0	1	0	5 (Note: Four appearances in UEFA Champions League, one in UEFA Europa League)	0	—		10	0
Kukësi	Total		164	1	34	2	21	0	2	0	221	3
Career total			164	1	34	2	21	0	2	0	221	3

=== International ===
As of 6 October 2017

Appearances and goals by national team and year
National team	Year	Apps	Goals
Kosovo
Kosovo	2017	1	0
Total		1	0

== Honours ==
Kukësi

- Albanian Cup: 2015–16
- Albanian Supercup: 2016
- Albanian Superliga: 2016–17
