= Felipe Moreira (footballer, born 1988) =

Brazilian footballer

Personal information
- Full name: Felipe Moreira Santos
- Date of birth: 28 November 1988 (age 37)
- Place of birth: Rio de Janeiro, Brazil
- Height: 1.71 m (5 ft 7 in)
- Position: Forward

Senior career*
Years	Team	Apps	(Gls)
2010	Alecrim	6	(1)
2010–2011	ABC	4	(0)
2011	Bragantino	5	(2)
2011	América-RN	15	(7)
2012	Luverdense	18	(10)
2013	Horizonte	22	(9)
2014–2015	Alecrim	28	(14)
2015–2017	Kukësi	10	(1)
- * Club domestic league appearances and goals

Felipe Moreira dos Santos (born 28 November 1988 in Rio de Janeiro), commonly known as Felipe Moreira, is a Brazilian footballer.

== Career ==
=== FK Kukësi ===
He left Alecrim and Brazil for the first time in his professional career to join Albanian Superliga side FK Kukësi ahead of the Europa League first qualifying round. He made his FK Kukësi and European debut on 2 July 2015 against Belarusian side FC Torpedo-BelAZ Zhodino in the first qualifying round of the Europa League, where he started the game and was substituted off in the 60th minute in the 2–0 win. On 23 July 2015 in the second qualifying round in the 2015-16 UEFA Europa League against Mladost Podgorica in the second leg, he scored the opening goal as his team ran out 4-2 winners (4-3 Aggregate) and progressed into the third qualifying round against Legia Warsaw. In that game on 30 July 2015, he scored the equaliser just after the half time break, however the game was called off as Ondrej Duda was struck by a lighter by some Kukësi supporters. UEFA then awarded Legia Warsaw a 3-0 win.

On 22 May 2016, his assist help his team Kukësi in the Albanian Cup Final against Laçi at the Qemal Stafa Stadium were his team won the final 5-3 on penalties after the game was drawn at 1-1 through 120 minutes.
