= Izair Emini =

Macedonian footballer (born 1985)

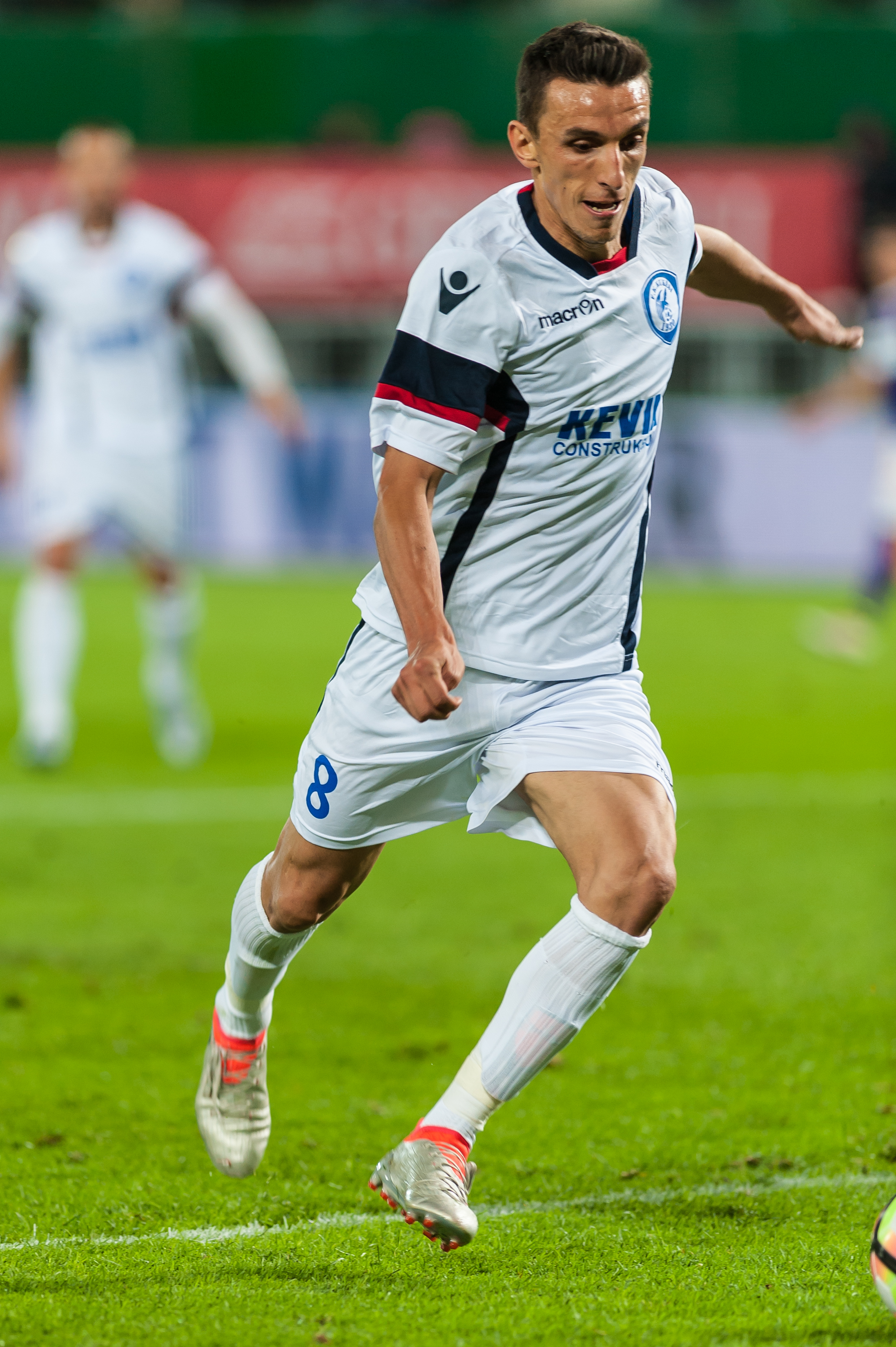
- Emini with Kukësi in 2016

Personal information
- Date of birth: 4 October 1985 (age 41)
- Place of birth: Tetovo, SFR Yugoslavia
- Height: 1.86 m (6 ft 1 in)
- Positions: Striker; attacking midfielder

Team information
- Current team: KF Besa Dobërdoll
- Number: 10

Youth career
- –2006: Renova

Senior career*
Years	Team	Apps	(Gls)
2007–2012	Shkendija	79	(26)
2013–2015	Renova	82	(40)
2016–2017	Kukësi	51	(18)
2017–2019	Shkendija	52	(19)
2019–2021	Drita	28	(6)
2021–2023	Voska Sport	42	(30)
2023–2024	Besa	28	(14)
- * Club domestic league appearances and goals as of 14 May 2024

Izair Emini (Macedonian Cyrillic: Изаир Емини; born 4 October 1985) is a retired Macedonian professional footballer who last played as a striker for second league side Besa 1976.

== Career ==
=== Renova ===
During the 2014–15 season, Emini was the top goalscorer with 20 goals, with Renova who qualified in the 2015–16 UEFA Europa League first qualifying round.

=== Kukësi ===
Emini joined Albanian Superliga side Kukësi on 7 January 2016 on a free transfer, signing an initial 6-month contract with the option of a further two years. During the presentation, he was handed the squad number 8.

==== 2015–16 season ====
He made his debut for the team on 23 January in the first leg of 2015–16 Albanian Cup's quarter-final against Teuta Durrës, where he played full-90 minutes in a 1–0 away lose. Eight days later, in his league debut, Emini scored twice, including a 22nd minute free kick goal in an eventual 3–0 home win versus Bylis Ballsh, becoming quickly a fan favourite. On 13 February, Emini was on the scoresheet again as he scored during the 2–2 home draw against the Europe rivals of Teuta Durrës, taking his tally up to 3 goals in 3 matches.

In March, Emini enjoyed a prolific form, scoring the winners against both Laçi and Tërbuni Pukë, being vital in the club's race for European competitions. On 18 May, in the final day of the league, Emini he scored both goals, both long-range strikes, in the 2–1 home win against Tirana to secure his side a spot in the UEFA Europa League for the next season.

Four days later, in the 2016 Albanian Cup Final against Laçi, Emini started and played 120 minutes in the 1–1 draw; the match went to penalty shootouts where Emini successfully converted his penalty shootout attempt to help the team win 5–3 for the first trophy in the club's history. Emini ended his first season with Kukësi by scoring 11 goals, including 10 in league, in 23 appearances, including 18 in league, as Kukësi finished the season in third position.

==== 2016–17 season ====
Emini started the new season by playing in the two-legged match against Rudar valid for the first qualifying round of Europa League, as Kukësi progressed to the next round with the aggregate 2–1. In the next round, the team faced Austria Wien. In the first leg, with Kukësi down 1–0, Emini missed a clear opportunity with an empty goal in the last minute, leaving the score unchanged. In the returning leg, Emini did not prevent the 4–1 defeat at Elbasan Arena as Kukësi was knocked out of the Europa League with the aggregate 5–1.

Emini begun the domestic season on 24 August by playing in the 2016 Albanian Supercup against Skënderbeu Korçë, scoring the second Kukësi goal in an eventual 3–1 win at the Selman Stërmasi Stadium, aiding the club to win its first ever Albanian Supercup trophy. On 24 September, during the goalless draw at Laçi, Emini suffered a leg injury that kept him sidelined for a month. He returned in training in last days of October, and played his first match against Dinamo Tirana for the Albanian Cup's first round, contributing with a goal in a 2–0 success. Three days later, Emini scored the winner against Luftëtari Gjirokastër in the last match of the first phase of the league helping Kukësi to remain the only team without a loss.

In May 2024 Emini played his last match for Besa 1976 in the second to last round of the Macedonian second division at home against Bashkimi 1947, announcing his retirement at the age of 38.

== Career statistics ==
As of 1 November 2016

Appearances and goals by club, season and competition
Club	Season	League			Cup		Continental		Other		Total	
Club	Season	Division	Apps	Goals	Apps	Goals	Apps	Goals	Apps	Goals	Apps	Goals
Shkëndija	2010–11	Macedonian First League	28	11	—		—		—		28	11
Shkëndija	2011–12	Macedonian First League	23	4	1	0	2 (Note: Appearance(s) in UEFA Champions League)	0	—		26	4
Shkëndija	2012–13	Macedonian First League	14	5	2	0	2 (Note: Appearance(s) in UEFA Europa League)	0	—		18	5
Shkëndija	Total		65	20	3	0	4	0	—		72	20
Renova	2012–13	Macedonian First League	14	5	—		—		—		14	5
Renova	2013–14	Macedonian First League	22	9	—		—		—		22	9
Renova	2014–15	Macedonian First League	31	20	4	2	—		—		35	22
Renova	2015–16	Macedonian First League	14	6	—		2	1	—		19	7
Renova	Total		81	40	4	2	2	1	—		87	43
Kukësi	2015–16	Albanian Superliga	18	10	5	1	—		—		23	11
Kukësi	2016–17	Albanian Superliga	5	2	1	1	4	0	1 (Note: Appearance in Albanian Supercup)	1	11	4
Kukësi	Total		23	12	6	2	4	0	1	1	33	15
Career total			169	72	13	4	10	1	1	1	193	78

== Honours ==
Shkëndija

- Macedonian First League: 2010–11
- Macedonian Super Cup: 2011

Kukësi

- Albanian Cup: 2015–16
- Albanian Supercup: 2016
- Albanian Superliga: 2016–17

Voska Sport

- Macedonian Second League: 2022-23

Besa

- Macedonian Second League: 2023-24

Individual

- Macedonian First League top goalscorer: 2014–15
- Macedonian Second League (West) top goalscorer: 2021–22
- Macedonian Second League top goalscorer: 2023-24
