= Jean Carioca (footballer, born 1988) =

Brazilian footballer

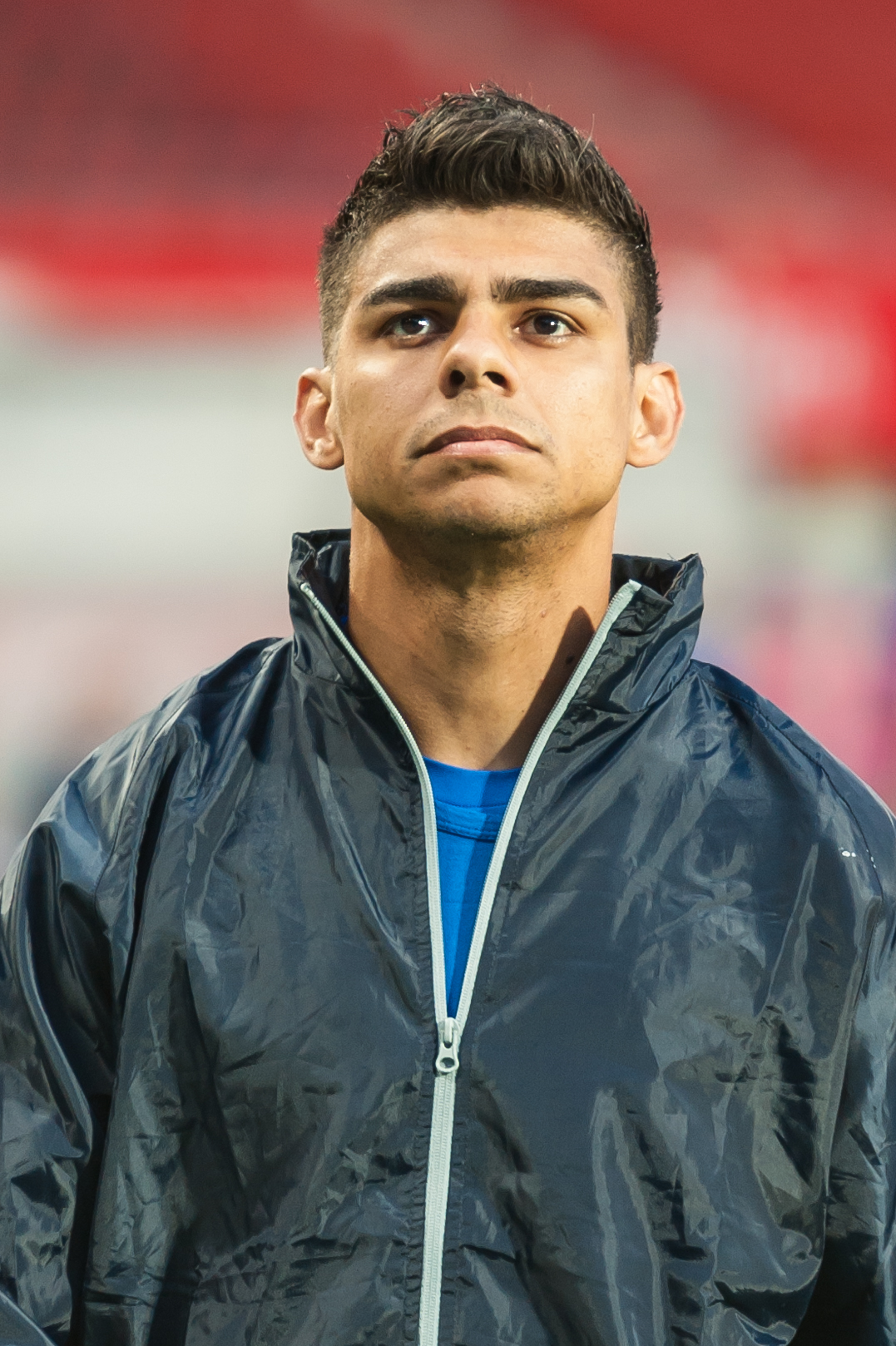
- Jean Carioca in 2016

Personal information
- Full name: Jean Agostinho da Silva
- Date of birth: 1 June 1988 (age 38)
- Place of birth: Duque de Caxias, Rio de Janeiro, Brazil
- Height: 1.76 m (5 ft 9 in)
- Position: Attacking midfielder

Senior career*
| Years | Team | Apps | (Gls) |
| 2006 | Tigres do Brasil | | |
| 2007 | CRB | | |
| 2008 | Potiguar | | |
| 2008 | ABC FC | ? | (5) |
| 2009–2013 | Tombense | 0 | (0) |
| 2009 | → Botafogo (loan) | 9 | (1) |
| 2009 | → Ponte Preta (loan) | 9 | (2) |
| 2010 | → Figueirense (loan) | 8 | (1) |
| 2011 | → Skoda Xanthi (loan) | 1 | (0) |
| 2011 | → Torreense (loan) | 0 | (0) |
| 2013 | → ABC (loan) | 15 | (0) |
| 2014 | XV de Piracicaba | 4 | (0) |
| 2014 | CSA | 4 | (0) |
| 2014 | Treze | 2 | (0) |
| 2015 | Tigres do Brasil | 14 | (2) |
| 2015–2017 | Kukësi | 67 | (4) |
| 2018 | URT | 17 | (1) |
| 2018–2021 | Feronikeli | 78 | (17) |
| 2021–2022 | Dukagjini | 32 | (1) |
- * Club domestic league appearances and goals

Jean Agostinho da Silva (born 1 June 1988), commonly known as Jean Carioca, is a Brazilian former professional footballer who played as an attacking midfielder.

== Career ==
Jean Carioca was born in Duque de Caxias, Rio de Janeiro.

He left Tigres do Brasil and Brazil for only the second time in his professional career to join Albanian Superliga side FK Kukësi ahead of the Europa League first qualifying round. He made his FK Kukësi and European debut on 2 July 2015 against Belarusian side FC Torpedo-BelAZ Zhodino in the first qualifying round of the Europa League, where he played the full 90 minutes and scored in the 9th minute of the 2–0 win.

In the 2015–16, he was the Number 10 player for Kukësi and he also established himself as a regular starter for the club. During the season, he only scored three league goals in 34 league appearances, along with a goal in the Albanian Cup Final against Laçi at the Qemal Stafa Stadium were his team won 5–3 on penalties after the final finished 1–1 through 120 minutes.
