= Ernest Gjoka =

Albanian football coach (born 1970)

Personal information
- Full name: Ernest Gjoka
- Date of birth: 25 January 1970 (age 56)
- Place of birth: Tirana, Albania

Team information
- Current team: Skënderbeu (manager)

Managerial career
- Years: Team
- 2010–2011: Apolonia
- 2011–2012: Kamza
- 2012: Tomori
- 2012: Apolonia
- 2012–2014: Flamurtari
- 2016–2017: Kukësi
- 2017–2018: Vllaznia
- 2018–2019: Kamza
- 2019: Kukësi
- 2019–2021: Shkëndija
- 2022–2023: Ohod
- 2024: Shkupi
- 2024–: Skëndërbeu

Ernest Gjoka (born 25 January 1970) is an Albanian professional football coach.

== Managerial career ==
=== Kukësi ===
One of his most important trophies was won with team of Kukësi. With Gjoka as a team manager, Kukësi made a season without any lost. Gjoka has also win 2 other trophies with Kukësi and qualified in many phases in UCL and UEL.

Shkëndija A big step on Gjoka's career was being a team manager at Shkendija, one of the best teams in Balkan. He demonstrated his coaching skills there, not only by winning the Macedonian league, but also by qualifying in UCL(uefa champions league) and playing a dream game against Jose Mourinho.

=== Ohod ===
On 20 September 2022, Gjoka was appointed as manager of Saudi club Ohod. He was sacked on 15 March 2023 and replaced by Augustin Călin.

== Honours ==
Shkëndija

- Macedonian First Football League: 2020–21

Kukësi

- Kategoria Superiore: 2016–17
- Albanian Cup: 2018–19

Flamurtari

- Albanian Cup: 2013–14
