= 2014–15 KF Skënderbeu Korçë season =

Skënderbeu Korçë
2014–15 season
- President: Ardian Takaj
- Head coach: Mirel Josa
- Stadium: Skënderbeu Stadium
- Kategoria Superiore: Winners
- Albanian Cup: Semi-final
- Champions League: Second qualifying round
- Albanian Supercup: Winners
- Top goalscorer: League: Dhiego Martins (7); All: Dhiego Martins (11)
- Highest home attendance: 7,031 vs. Kukësi; 23 February 2015
- Lowest home attendance: 300 vs. Tërbuni Pukë; 20 November 2014
- Average home league attendance: 3,509
Home colours	Away colours

The 2014–15 season was Skënderbeu Korçë's fifth season competing in the Kategoria Superiore, having won four consecutive time titles in the last four years.

== First team ==
Squad No.	Nationality	Position	Name	Date of birth (age)	Apps.	Goals	Signed In	Signing Fee	Contract ends
Goalkeepers
1	(Albania)	GK	Orges Shehi (VC)	25 September 1977 (age 49)	157	0	2010	Free	2015
12	(Albania)	GK	Erjon Llapanji	10 May 1985 (age 41)	62	0	2006	Youth System	2015
Defenders
3	(Albania)	DF	Renato Arapi	28 August 1986 (age 40)	133	5	2010	Free	2015
4	(Kosovo)	DF	Samir Sahiti	15 August 1988 (age 38)	5	0	2013	Free	2015
5	(Kosovo)	DF	Bajram Jashanica	25 September 1990 (age 36)	0	0	2013	Free	2015
17	(Albania)	DF	Tefik Osmani	8 June 1985 (age 41)	20	1	2014	Free	2015
20	(Brazil)	DF	Ademir	20 September 1985 (age 41)	48	1	2012	€50,000	2015
32	(Albania)	DF	Kristi Vangjeli	5 September 1985 (age 41)	0	0	2014	Free	2015
33	(Croatia)	DF	Marko Radaš	26 October 1983 (age 43)	104	4	2011	Free	2015
Midfielders
2	(Albania)	MF	Amarildo Dimo	25 August 1982 (age 44)	69	3	2014	€15,000	2015
7	(Albania)	MF	Gerhard Progni	6 November 1986 (age 40)	0	0	2014	Free	2015
9	(Albania)	MF	Enkeleid Alikaj	27 December 1981 (age 44)	18	0	2014	Free	2015
10	(Albania)	MF	Bledi Shkëmbi	13 August 1979 (age 47)	255	45	2008	Free	2015
14	(Albania)	MF	Leonit Abazi	5 July 1993 (age 33)	12	0	2013	Free	2015
19	(Mali)	MF	Bakary Nimaga	6 December 1994 (age 31)	22	0	2013	Free	2017
23	(Kosovo)	MF	Bernard Berisha	24 October 1991 (age 35)	0	0	2014	Free	2016
77	(Brazil)	MF	Marconi	22 June 1988 (age 38)	0	0	2014	Free	2016
88	(Albania)	MF	Sabien Lilaj	18 February 1989 (age 37)	69	10	2012	Free	2015
Forwards
19	(Brazil)	FW	Dhiego Martins	27 August 1988 (age 38)	0	0	2014	Free	2015
27	(Kosovo)	MF	Liridon Latifi	6 February 1994 (age 32)	0	0	2015	Free	2016
29	(Albania)	FW	Fatjon Sefa	23 July 1984 (age 42)	0	0	2014	Free	2015
30	(Albania)	FW	Andi Ribaj	21 November 1989 (age 36)	40	9	2013	Free	2015
77	(North Macedonia)	FW	Aco Stojkov	29 April 1983 (age 43)	0	0	2015	Free	2015

- Last updated: 21 July 2014
- Source: , Players in / out, Wikipedia players' articles and (for appearances and goals)

== Transfers ==
=== In ===
Date	Pos.	Player	Age	Moving from	Fee	Notes
10 April 2014	MF	(Nigeria) Ovbokha Agboyi	19	(Nigeria) Enugu Rangers	Free	
18 May 2014	FW	(Albania) Fatjon Sefa	29	(Albania) Besa Kavajë	Free	
27 May 2014	MF	(Kosovo) Bernard Berisha	22	(Albania) Besa Kavajë	Free	
29 May 2014	DF	(Albania) Tefik Osmani	28	(Albania) Teuta Durrës	Free	
30 May 2014	DF	(Kosovo) Bajram Jashanica	23	(Albania) Besa Kavajë	Loan return	
31 May 2014	DF	(Albania) Kristi Vangjeli	28	(Greece) Aris	Free	
10 June 2014	MF	(Albania) Gerhard Progni	27	(Albania) Kukësi	Free	
27 June 2014	MF	(Brazil) Marconi	26	(Brazil) Serrano Sport Club	Free	
1 January 2015	MF	(Kosovo) Liridon Latifi	20	(Kosovo) Prishtina	Free	
11 January 2015	FW	(North Macedonia) Aco Stojkov	31	(North Macedonia) Rabotnički	Free	

=== Out ===
Date	Pos.	Player	Age	Moving to	Fee	Notes
31 May 2014	DF	(Albania) Ditmar Bicaj	25	(Albania) Kukësi	Free	
31 May 2014	DF	(Serbia) Ivan Gvozdenović	35	Free Agent	N/A	
31 May 2014	MF	(Croatia) Željko Tomić	28	Free Agent	N/A	
31 May 2014	DF	(Albania) Erbim Fagu	27	Free Agent	N/A	
12 June 2014	MF	(Albania) Gjergji Muzaka	29	(Albania) Flamurtari Vlorë	Free	
17 June 2014	FW	(Croatia) Pero Pejić	31	(Albania) Kukësi	Free	

== Pre-season and friendlies ==
14 June 2014 Friendly	Wacker Innsbruck (Austria)	2–0	(Albania) Skënderbeu Korçë	Austria
14:30 CET	Vuleta 41'; Hirschhofer 87'

18 June 2014 Friendly	Ried (Austria)	2–0	(Albania) Skënderbeu Korçë	Austria
17:30 CET	Fröschl 9'; Mayr-Fälten 58'

23 June 2014 Friendly	Skënderbeu Korçë (Albania)	1–0	(Slovakia) Senica	Austria
18:00 CET	Osmani 81'

23 June 2014 Friendly	Shakhtar Donetsk (Ukraine)	3–0	(Albania) Skënderbeu Korçë	Going am Wilden Kaiser, Austria
17:30 CET	Gladkiy 25'; Kryvtsov 38'; Taison 88'		Shkëmbi (penalty missed) 28'	Stadium: SC Going Stadium; Attendance: 50; Referee: Midkhat Teletovic (Austria)

29 June 2014 Friendly	Skënderbeu Korçë (Albania)	2–4	(Ukraine) Dynamo Kyiv	Jenbach, Austria
16:00 CET	Sefa 29'; Progni 39'		Yarmolenko 25'; Radaš 29' (o.g.); Mbokani 81'; Tsygankov 85'	Stadium: Jenbach Stadion; Attendance: 150

2 July 2014 Friendly	Skënderbeu Korçë (Albania)	1–3	(Czech Republic) Mladá Boleslav	Austria
17:00 CET	Sefa 23'		Rosa 9'; Vraštil 85'; Mehanovič 89'

8 August 2014 Friendly	Skënderbeu Korçë (Albania)	0–0	(Italy) Trapani	Flachau, Austria
				Referee: Ramiz Begović (Bosnia and Herzegovina)

14 August 2014 Friendly	Kayserispor (Turkey)	1–2	(Albania) Skënderbeu Korçë	Austria
	Nobre 29'		Marconi 4'; Progni 27'

14 August 2014 Friendly	Skënderbeu Korçë (Albania)	6–3	(Albania) Bilisht Sport	Korçë, Albania
	Martins 4', 15'; Shkëmbi 27'; Progni 32'; Olayinka 43'; Alikaj 75' (pen.)	report	Kora 38'; Ahmetlli 53' (pen.); Cane 89'	Stadium: Skënderbeu Stadium; Referee: Ervis Kello

== Competitions ==
=== Albanian Supercup ===
15 August 2014 Final	Skënderbeu Korçë	1–0	Flamurtari Vlorë	Tirana
19:00 CET	Nimaga 52'			Stadium: Qemal Stafa Stadium; Attendance: 2,200; Referee: Enea Jorgji

=== Kategoria Superiore ===
==== League table ====
Pos	Team	Pld	W	D	L	GF	GA	GD	Pts	Qualification or relegation
1	Skënderbeu (C)	36	24	7	5	58	18	+40	79	Qualification for the Champions League second qualifying round
2	Kukësi	36	23	6	7	59	27	+32	75	Qualification for the Europa League first qualifying round
3	Partizani	36	22	7	7	42	24	+18	73	Qualification for the Europa League first qualifying round
4	Tirana	36	21	8	7	47	27	+20	71	
5	Laçi	36	20	9	7	46	19	+27	69	Qualification for the Europa League first qualifying round (Note: Laçi qualified for the UEFA Europa League first qualifying round by winning the 2014–15 Albanian Cup.)

Source: Albanian Football Association (in Albanian), Soccerway
Rules for classification: 1) points; 2) points in head-to-head matches; 3) goal difference in head-to-head matches; 4) goals scored in head-to-head matches; 5) total goal difference; 6) total goals scored; 7) draw
(C) Champions

==== Results summary ====
Overall								Home						Away					
Pld	W	D	L	GF	GA	GD	Pts	W	D	L	GF	GA	GD	W	D	L	GF	GA	GD
36	24	7	5	58	18	+40	79	15	3	0	43	9	+34	9	4	5	15	9	+6

Last updated: 22 May 2015.
Source: Competitive matches

==== Results by round ====
Round	1	2	3	4	5	6	7	8	9	10	11	12	13	14	15	16	17	18	19	20	21	22	23	24	25	26	27	28	29	30	31	32	33	34	35	36
Ground	A	H	A	A	H	A	H	A	H	H	A	H	H	A	H	A	H	A	A	H	A	A	H	A	H	A	H	H	A	H	H	A	H	A	H	A
Result	W	W	L	D	W	L	D	D	W	W	W	W	W	L	W	L	W	W	W	D	D	W	D	W	W	W	W	W	L	W	W	W	W	D	W	W
Position	4	3	4	4	2	4	5	6	5	4	4	3	2	4	2	4	2	2	2	3	3	3	3	2	2	1	1	1	1	1	1	1	1	1	1	1

Source: Competitive matches
A = Away; H = Home; W = Win; D = Draw; L = Loss

==== Matches ====
23 August 2014 1	Elbasani	0–1	Skënderbeu Korçë	Tirana
18:00 CET		Report	Sefa 10'	Stadium: Qemal Stafa Stadium; Attendance: 500; Referee: Emirjon Sino

30 August 2014 2	Skënderbeu Korçë	2–0	Laçi	Korçë
17:00 CET	Osmani 82'; Progni 90+3'	Report		Stadium: Skënderbeu Stadium; Attendance: 2,500; Referee: Olsi Sokoli

11 September 2014 3	Partizani Tirana	1–0	Skënderbeu Korçë	Tirana
19:00 CET	Vila 90' (pen.)	Report		Stadium: Qemal Stafa Stadium; Attendance: 6,500; Referee: Enea Jorgji

14 September 2014 4	Apolonia Fier	0–0	Skënderbeu Korçë	Fier
20:00 CET		Report		Stadium: Loni Papuçiu Stadium; Attendance: 3,500; Referee: Blerim Ziri

19 September 2014 5	Skënderbeu Korçë	2–0	Kukësi	Korçë
19:00 CET	Sefa 64'; Progni 75'	Report		Stadium: Skënderbeu Stadium; Attendance: 6,500; Referee: Enea Jorgji

27 September 2014 6	Teuta Durrës	2–0	Skënderbeu Korçë	Durrës
19:00 CET	Peposhi 26'; Krasniqi 36'	Report		Stadium: Niko Dovana Stadium; Attendance: 1,800; Referee: Lorenc Jemini

4 October 2014 7	Skënderbeu Korçë	0–0	Tirana	Korçë
20:00 CET		Report		Stadium: Skënderbeu Stadium; Attendance: 7,000; Referee: Kridens Meta

17 October 2014 8	Flamurtari Vlorë	1–1	Skënderbeu Korçë	Vlorë
19:00 CET	Abilaliaj 11'	Report	Vangjeli 31'	Stadium: Flamurtari Stadium; Attendance: 3,000; Referee: Bardhyl Pashaj

25 October 2014 9	Skënderbeu Korçë	3–0	Vllaznia Shkodër	Korçë
14:00 CET	Dimo 22'; Olayinka 57'; Vangjeli 77'	Report		Stadium: Skënderbeu Stadium; Attendance: 1,000; Referee: Kreshnik Cjapi

29 October 2014 10	Skënderbeu Korçë	1–0	Elbasani	Korçë
14:00 CET	Olayinka 51'	Report		Stadium: Skënderbeu Stadium; Attendance: 400; Referee: Andi Koçi

2 November 2014 11	Laçi	0–2	Skënderbeu Korçë	Laç
13:00 CET		Report	Olayinka 30'; Sefa 86'	Stadium: Laçi Stadium; Attendance: 500; Referee: Kridens Meta

8 November 2014 12	Skënderbeu Korçë	3–0	Partizani Tirana	Korçë
17:00 CET	Martins 29', 72'; Sefa 90'	Report		Stadium: Skënderbeu Stadium; Attendance: 5,000; Referee: Laver Alla

23 November 2014 13	Skënderbeu Korçë	6–0	Apolonia Fier	Korçë
14:00 CET	Progni 1', 88'; Shkëmbi 27' (pen.); Martins 47', 68', 77'	Report		Stadium: Skënderbeu Stadium; Attendance: 1,500; Referee: Edvaldo Durmishi

30 November 2014 14	Kukësi	1–0	Skënderbeu Korçë	Kukës
14:00 CET	Dushku 47'	Report		Stadium: Zeqir Ymeri Stadium; Attendance: 4,000; Referee: Bardhyl Pashaj

6 December 2014 15	Skënderbeu Korçë	3–2	Teuta Durrës	Korçë
13:00 CET	Shehi 41' (pen.); Alikaj 60'; Olayinka 66'	Report	Hyseni 77'; Dita 82'	Stadium: Skënderbeu Stadium; Attendance: 1,231; Referee: Lorenc Jemini

13 December 2014 16	Tirana	2–0	Skënderbeu Korçë	Tirana
13:00 CET	Ndikumana 8', 50'	report		Stadium: Qemal Stafa Stadium; Attendance: 0 Referee: Enea Jorgji

17 December 2014 17	Skënderbeu Korçë	1–0	Flamurtari Vlorë	Korçë
16:00 CET	Olayinka 50'	Report		Stadium: Skënderbeu Stadium; Attendance: 4,000; Referee: Blerim Ziri

21 December 2014 18	Vllaznia Shkodër	0–1	Skënderbeu Korçë	Shkodër
17:00 CET		Report	Shkëmbi 90' (pen.)	Stadium: Loro Boriçi Stadium; Attendance: 8,000; Referee: Kridens Meta

25 January 2015 19	Elbasani	1–4	Skënderbeu Korçë	Elbasan
17:00 CET	Agboyi 67'	Report	Olayinka 7'; Vangjeli 34'; Berisha 63'; Nimaga 89'	Stadium: Elbasan Arena; Attendance: 0 Referee: Kreshnik Cjapi

31 January 2015 20	Skënderbeu Korçë	0–0	Laçi	Korçë
14:00 CET		Report		Stadium: Skënderbeu Stadium; Attendance: 1,500; Referee: Klajdi Kola

9 February 2015 21	Partizani Tirana	0–0	Skënderbeu Korçë	Durrës
18:00 CET		Report		Stadium: Niko Dovana Stadium; Attendance: 1,500; Referee: Kridens Meta

14 February 2015 22	Apolonia Fier	0–1	Skënderbeu Korçë	Fier
17:00 CET		Report	Stojkov 27'	Stadium: Loni Papuçiu Stadium; Attendance: 1,000; Referee: Bardhyl Pashaj

23 February 2015 23	Skënderbeu Korçë	1–1	Kukësi	Korçë
18:00 CET	Abazi 51'	Report	Zeqiri 90+3' (pen.)	Stadium: Skënderbeu Stadium; Attendance: 7,031; Referee: Lorenc Jemini

28 February 2015 24	Teuta Durrës	0–1	Skënderbeu Korçë	Durrës
14:00 CET		Report	Shkëmbi 45+4' (pen.)	Stadium: Niko Dovana Stadium; Attendance: 500; Referee: Kreshnik Cjapi

4 March 2015 25	Skënderbeu Korçë	1–0	Tirana	Korçë
17:00 CET	Shkëmbi 66' (pen.)	Report		Stadium: Skënderbeu Stadium; Attendance: 6,000; Referee: Enea Jorgji

8 March 2015 26	Flamurtari Vlorë	0–1	Skënderbeu Korçë	Vlorë
17:00 CET		Report	Stojkov 51'	Stadium: Flamurtari Stadium; Attendance: 1,000; Referee: Andi Koçi

15 March 2015 27	Skënderbeu Korçë	3–1	Vllaznia Shkodër	Korçë
14:00 CET	Radaš 56'; Latifi 74'; Lilaj 83'	Report	Gocaj 72' (pen.)	Stadium: Skënderbeu Stadium; Attendance: 0 Referee: Kreshnik Cjapi

21 March 2015 28	Skënderbeu Korçë	5–1	Elbasani	Korçë,
17:00 CET	Toçi 13' (o.g.); Martins 20'; Nimaga 68', 71'; Latifi 84'	Report	Gava 24'	Stadium: Skënderbeu Stadium; Attendance: 2,500; Referee: Olsi Sokoli

4 April 2015 29	Laçi	1–0	Skënderbeu Korçë	Laç
14:00 CET	Sefgjinaj 90+4'	Report		Stadium: Laçi Stadium; Attendance: 350; Referee: Enea Jorgji

13 April 2015 30	Skënderbeu Korçë	5–2	Partizani Tirana	Korçë
18:00 CET	Lilaj 12'; Latifi 38'; Berisha 46'; Stojkov 53'; Radaš 65'	Report	Račić 45', 58'	Stadium: Skënderbeu Stadium; Attendance: 6,500; Referee: Enea Jorgji

18 April 2015 31	Skënderbeu Korçë	1–0	Apolonia Fier	Korçë
17:00 CET	Sefa 84'	Report		Stadium: Skënderbeu Stadium; Attendance: 1,500; Referee: Olsi Sokoli

26 April 2015 32	Kukësi	0–1	Skënderbeu Korçë	Kukës
16:00 CET		Report	Lilaj 65'	Stadium: Zeqir Ymeri Stadium; Attendance: 4,000; Referee: Kridens Meta

2 May 2015 33	Skënderbeu Korçë	4–2	Teuta Durrës	Korçë
19:00 CET	Latifi 33'; Martins 48'; Berisha 52'; Sefa 77'	Report	Kotobelli 43'; Peposhi 54'	Stadium: Skënderbeu Stadium; Attendance: 2,000; Referee: Adrian Beqiri

9 May 2015 34	Tirana	0–0	Skënderbeu Korçë	Tirana
19:00 CET		Report		Stadium: Qemal Stafa Stadium; Attendance: 5,000; Referee: Andi Koçi

16 May 2015 35	Skënderbeu Korçë	2–0	Flamurtari Vlorë	Korçë
19:30 CET	Latifi 40'; Lilaj 90'	Report		Stadium: Skënderbeu Stadium; Attendance: 7,000; Referee: Kreshnik Cjapi

22 May 2015 36	Vllaznia Shkodër	0–2	Skënderbeu Korçë	Korçë
18:00 CET		Report	Berisha 10'; Progni 42'	Stadium: Skënderbeu Stadium; Attendance: 3,671; Referee: Andi Koçi

=== Albanian Cup ===
==== First round ====
1 October 2014 First leg	Himara	1–10	Skënderbeu Korçë	Kavajë
14:30 CET	Kaçanaj 79' (pen.)	Report	Abazi 2', 48'; Lulaj 10'; Berisha 20'; Kame 31'; Martins 52'; Olayinka 54', 58'; Ribaj 70', 84'	Stadium: Besa Stadium; Attendance: 200; Referee: Elidon Halo

22 October 2014 Second leg	Skënderbeu Korçë	10–0 (20–1 agg.)	Himara	Durrës
14:00 CET	Sefa 2'; Martins 29', 33', 34'; Jashanica 36'; Ribaj 47'; Berisha 62'; Nimaga 71'; Lulaj 79'; Lilaj 81'	Report		Stadium: Fusha Sportive e Kompleksit Tropikal; Attendance: 50; Referee: Erald Demiraj

==== Second round ====
5 November 2014 First leg	Tërbuni Pukë	0–0	Skënderbeu Korçë	Pukë
14:00 CET		Report		Stadium: Ismail Xhemali Stadium; Attendance: 250; Referee: Indrit Myrtja

20 November 2014 Second leg	Skënderbeu Korçë	6–1 (6–1 agg.)	Tërbuni Pukë	Korçë
13:30 CET	Progni 3'; Ribaj 26'; Shkëmbi 67' (pen.); Sefa 72'; Alikaj 83'; Olayinka 85'	Report	Greca 2'	Stadium: Skënderbeu Stadium; Attendance: 300; Referee: Erald Demiraj

==== Quarter-finals ====
4 February 2015 First leg	Flamurtari Vlorë	1–1	Skënderbeu Korçë	Vlorë
14:00 CET	Nikolić 62'	Report	Shkëmbi 77' (pen.)	Stadium: Flamurtari Stadium; Attendance: 1,500; Referee: Lorenc Jemini

18 February 2015 Second leg	Skënderbeu Korçë	3–1 (4–2 agg.)	Flamurtari Vlorë	Korçë
14:00 CET	Osmani 45+1'; Berisha 55'; Shkëmbi 90'	Report	Hodža 73'	Stadium: Skënderbeu Stadium; Attendance: 1,000; Referee: Enea Jorgji

==== Semi-finals ====
8 April 2015 First leg	Kukësi	1–0	Skënderbeu Korçë	Kukës
14:00 CET	Pejić 6'	Report		Stadium: Zeqir Ymeri Stadium; Attendance: 0 Referee: Andi Koçi

22 April 2015 Second leg	Skënderbeu Korçë	1–1 (1–2 agg.)	Kukësi	Korçë
17:30 CET	Progni 15'	Report	Pejić 24'	Stadium: Skënderbeu Stadium; Attendance: 6,000; Referee: Enea Jorgji

=== UEFA Champions League ===
==== Second qualifying round ====
15 July 2014 First leg	BATE Borisov (Belarus)	0–0	(Albania) Skënderbeu Korçë	Borisov, Belarus
19:00 CET		Report		Stadium: Borisov Arena; Attendance: 12,671; Referee: Georgi Kabakov (Bulgaria)

22 July 2014 Second leg	Skënderbeu Korçë (Albania)	1–1 (1–1a agg.)	(Belarus) BATE Borisov	Korçë, Albania
20:00 CET	Radaš 67'	Report	Khagush 29'	Stadium: Skënderbeu Stadium; Attendance: 7,000; Referee: Ante Vučemilović-Šimunović (Croatia)
