= 2013–14 Albanian Cup =

Kupa e Shqipërisë

Tournament details
- Country: Albania
- Teams: 36

Final positions
- Champions: Flamurtari
- Runners-up: Kukësi

Tournament statistics
- Matches played: 56
- Goals scored: 161 (2.88 per match)

2013–14 Albanian Cup (Albanian: Kupa e Shqipërisë) is the sixty-second season of Albania's annual cup competition. KF Laçi are the most recent winners of the competition, that being their first Cup trophy.

Ties are played in a two-legged format similar to those of European competitions. If the aggregate score is tied after both games, the team with the higher number of away goals advances. If the number of away goals is equal in both games, the match is decided by extra time and a penalty shoot-out, if necessary.

== Preliminary round ==
In order to reduce the number of participating teams for the first round to 32, a preliminary tournament is played. In contrast to the main tournament, the preliminary tournament is held as a single-leg knock-out competition. Matches were played on 25 September 2013 and involved the teams from Albanian Second Division.

Team 1	Score	Team 2
Besëlidhja (III)	1–0	Olimpik (III)
Iliria (III)	1–1 (5–4 p)	Sukthi (III)
Gramshi (III)	0–0 (5–3 p)	Bilisht Sport (III)
Naftëtari (III)	3–0	Delvina (III)

== First round ==
All 28 teams of the 2013–14 Superliga and First Division entered in this round along with the four qualifiers from the preliminary round. The first legs were played on 23 October 2013 and the second legs took place on 6 November 2013.

Team 1	Agg.	Team 2	1st leg	2nd leg
Iliria (III)	1−11	Skënderbeu (I)	1−3	0−8
Besëlidhja (III)	1−4	Teuta (I)	1−2	0−2
Albpetrol (II)	2−3	Tirana (I)	1−0	1−3
Elbasani (II)	1−4	Laçi (I)	1−2	0−2
Kamza (II)	4−6	Besa (I)	0−2	4−4
Himara (II)	3−5	Lushnja (I)	3−2	0−3
Burreli (II)	3−4	Shkumbini (II)	2−1	1−3
Mamurrasi (II)	4−4 (a)	Luftëtari (II)	2−1	2−3
Naftëtari (III)	0−6	Kukësi (I)	0−1	0−5
Gramshi (III)	0−5	Flamurtari (I)	0−3	0−2
Veleçiku (II)	0−5	Vllaznia (I)	0−3	0−2
Butrinti (II)	2−4	Kastrioti (I)	1−1	1−3
Dinamo Tirana (II)	0−4	Bylis (I)	0−2	0−2
Ada (II)	2−4	Partizani (I)	1−1	1−3
Tërbuni (II)	2−4	Apolonia (II)	0−3	2−1
Pogradeci (II)	2−3	Tomori (II)	0−0	2−3

== Second round ==
All 16 qualified teams from First round progressed to the second round. The first legs were played on 4 December 2013 and the second legs took place on 18 December 2013.

Team 1	Agg.	Team 2	1st leg	2nd leg
Shkumbini (II)	0−2	Teuta (I)	0−0	0−2
Besa (I)	2−6	Laçi (I)	0−2	2−4
Mamurrasi (II)	1−6	Skënderbeu (I)	1−4	0−2
Lushnja (I)	2−1	Tirana (I)	1−0	1−1 (a.e.t.)
Tomori (II)	2−6	Flamurtari (I)	0−2	2−4
Bylis (I)	4−3	Kastrioti (I)	1−1	3−2
Apolonia (II)	1−4	Kukësi (I)	1−0	0−4
Partizani (I)	0−1	Vllaznia (I)	0−0	0−1 (a.e.t.)

== Quarter-finals ==
Team 1	Agg.	Team 2	1st leg	2nd leg
Lushnja (I)	4–7	Teuta (I)	2–4	2–3
Laçi (I)	0–3	Skënderbeu (I)	0–1	0–2
Bylis (I)	2–4	Kukësi (I)	1–2	1–2
Vllaznia (I)	0–1	Flamurtari (I)	0–0	0–1

12 February 2014	Lushnja	2–4	Teuta	Abdurrahman Roza Haxhiu Stadium, Lushnjë
14:00 CET	Canka 44', 85'	Report	Çyrbja 47', 84'; T. Osmani 60'; Da Silva Buiu 90+2'	Referee: Adrian Beqiraj

26 February 2014	Teuta	3–2	Lushnja	Niko Dovana Stadium, Durrës
14:00 CET	Nika 50'; Dosti 54'; Hodo 67'	Report	Cela 33'; Arbëri 70'	Referee: Blendi Breshani

Teuta advanced to the semi finals.

12 February 2014	Laçi	0–1	Skënderbeu	Laçi Stadium, Laç
14:00 CET		Report	Pejić 83'	Referee: Remzi Sadiku

26 February 2014	Skënderbeu	2–0	Laçi	Skënderbeu Stadium, Korçë
14:00 CET	Tomić 51'; Tahirllari 90+2'	Report

Skënderbeu advanced to the semi finals.

12 February 2014	Bylis	1–2	Kukësi	Adush Muça Stadium, Ballsh
14:00 CET	Meto 48'	Report	Cikalleshi 56', 82'	Referee: Laver Alla

26 February 2014	Kukësi	2–1	Bylis	Zeqir Ymeri Stadium, Kukës
14:00 CET	Cikalleshi 60'; Hysa 90'	Report	Idrizi 26'	Referee: Edvaldo Durmishi

Kukësi advanced to the semi finals.

12 February 2014	Vllaznia	0–0	Flamurtari	Loro Boriçi Stadium, Shkodër
14:00 CET		Report		Referee: Kreshnik Cjapi

26 February 2014	Flamurtari	1–0	Vllaznia	Flamurtari Stadium, Vlorë
14:00 CET	Abilaliaj 50'	Report		Referee: Andi Koçi

Flamurtari advanced to the semi finals.

== Semi-finals ==
Team 1	Agg.	Team 2	1st leg	2nd leg
Kukësi (I)	4–2	Teuta (I)	3–2	1–0
Flamurtari (I)	2–0	Skënderbeu (I)	0–0	2–0

26 March 2014	Kukësi	3–2	Teuta	Zeqir Ymeri Stadium, Kukës
15:00 CET	Izuchukwuka 4'; Hysa 77'; Cikalleshi 83'	Report	Ahmataj 8'; Jakupi 89'	Referee: Lorenc Jemini

9 April 2014	Teuta	0−1	Kukësi	Niko Dovana Stadium, Durrës
15:30 CEST		Report	Boya 14'	Referee: Lorenc Jemini

Kukësi advanced to the final.

26 March 2014	Flamurtari	0–0	Skënderbeu	Flamurtari Stadium, Vlorë
15:00 CET		Report		Referee: Bardhyl Pashaj

9 April 2014	Skënderbeu	0−2	Flamurtari	Skënderbeu Stadium, Korçë
15:30 CEST		Report	Liçaj 19'; Telushi 38'	Referee: Bardhyl Pashaj

Flamurtari advanced to the final.

== Final ==
18 May 2014
18:00

Flamurtari	1−0	Kukësi
Abilaliaj 44'	Report

Qemal Stafa Stadium, Tirana
Attendance: 7,000
Referee: Enea Jorgji
