= Bajram Jashanica =

Kosovar footballer (born 1990)

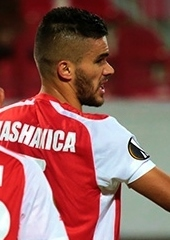
- Jashanica with Skënderbeu Korçë in October 2015

Personal information
- Full name: Bajram Jashanica
- Date of birth: 25 September 1990 (age 36)
- Place of birth: Vranidoll, SFR Yugoslavia
- Height: 1.90 m (6 ft 3 in)
- Position: Centre-back

Team information
- Current team: Ballkani
- Number: 32

Youth career
- 2005–2009: Hysi

Senior career*
Years	Team	Apps	(Gls)
2009–2013	Hysi	80	(5)
2013–2020	Skënderbeu	100	(5)
2013–2014	→ Besa (loan)	23	(0)
2020–	Ballkani	180	(7)

International career^{‡}
2014–	Kosovo	6	(0)
- * Club domestic league appearances and goals as of 22 June 2026 ‡ National team caps and goals as of 10 June 2021

Bajram Jashanica (born 25 September 1990) is a Kosovan professional footballer who plays as a centre-back for Kosovan club Ballkani.

== Club career ==
=== Hysi and unsuccessful test with FSV Frankfurt ===
Jashanica was one of Hysi's main players and 2010–11 season proved successful after he and even his team is announced campion of 2010–11 Football Superleague of Kosovo and winner of 2011 Kosovo Supercup. On 19 March 2013, Liga-Zwei.de announced that Jashanica is in the test to 2. Bundesliga side FSV Frankfurt, but unfortunately this test turned out to fail.

=== Skënderbeu Korçë ===
In mid-August 2013, Jashanica joined Albanian Superliga side Skënderbeu Korçë.

==== Loan at Besa Kavajë ====
On 2 September 2013, Jashanica joined to another Albanian Superliga club Besa Kavajë, on a season-long loan. On 20 October 2013, he made his debut in a 1–1 away draw against Kukësi after coming on as a substitute at 74th minute in place of Fisnik Ramadanaj.

==== Return from loan ====
===== 2014–15 season =====
On 30 June 2014, Jashanica is returned to Skënderbeu Korçë after the loan. His debut with Skënderbeu Korçë came on 17 August in the 2014 Albanian Supercup against Flamurtari Vlorë after coming on as a substitute at 65th minute in place of Tefik Osmani.

At the end of the 2014–15 season, Jashanica renewed his contract with Skënderbeu Korçë for another two years alongside fellow Kosovo Albanian player Leonit Abazi. On 5 June 2015, the contract officially was signed and it the two-year contract would keep he at the club until at least of 2017, but with the option of another year as well.

===== 2015–16 season =====
Jashanica started the 2015–16 season as the best, he netted in a header from a corner assisted by teammate Bernard Berisha in a 5–1 away defeat in the group stage of 2015–16 UEFA Europa League against Sporting CP, that was the first ever goal that Skënderbeu Korçë have scored in a major tournament. He, became one of Skënderbeu Korçë's main players and played 22 matches in the league as Skënderbeu Korçë finished as champion.

==== Ban from football by UEFA ====
In April 2018, Panorama Sport announced that Jashanica it is at risk to be punished with a two-year ban from football by UEFA. On 12 June 2018, Skënderbeu Korçë announced that Jashanica had been handed a two-year ban from UEFA competitions due to testing positive in anti-doping testing.

==== Return from ban ====
Jashanica's disqualification expired on 23 February 2020 and eight days later, he played his first match after returned from ban in the 2019–20 Albanian Superliga match against Vllaznia Shkodër after being named in the starting line-up.

== International career ==
On 19 May 2014, Jashanica received a call-up from Kosovo for the friendly matches against Turkey and Senegal. On 21 May 2014, he made his debut with Kosovo in friendly match against Turkey after coming on as a substitute at 80th minute in place of Mehmet Hetemaj.

== Career statistics ==
=== Club ===
As of 23 May 2021

Club	Season	League			Cup		Europe (Note: Including continental competitions, such as UEFA Champions League and UEFA Europa League)		Other (Note: Including other competitions, such as Albanian Supercup)		Total	
Club	Season	Division	Apps	Goals	Apps	Goals	Apps	Goals	Apps	Goals	Apps	Goals
Skënderbeu Korçë	2013–14	Kategoria Superiore	0	0	0	0	0	0	1	0	1	0
Besa Kavajë (loan)	2013–14	Kategoria Superiore	23	0	1	0	—				24	0
Skënderbeu Korçë	2014–15	Kategoria Superiore	22	0	6	1	2	0	0	0	30	1
Skënderbeu Korçë	2015–16	Kategoria Superiore	22	0	5	0	10	1	1	0	38	1
Skënderbeu Korçë	2016–17	Kategoria Superiore	31	3	7	0	0	0	0	0	38	3
Skënderbeu Korçë	2017–18	Kategoria Superiore	14	1	0	0	13	0	0	0	27	1
Skënderbeu Korçë	2018–19	Kategoria Superiore	Banned by UEFA									
Skënderbeu Korçë	2019–20	Kategoria Superiore	11	1	0	0	—				11	1
Skënderbeu Korçë	Total		123	5	19	1	25	1	2	0	169	7
Ballkani	2020–21	Kosovo Superleague	23	1	2	0	—				25	1
Career total			146	6	21	1	25	1	2	0	194	8

=== International ===
As of 10 June 2021

National team	Year	Apps	Goals
Kosovo
Kosovo	2014	1	0
Kosovo	2015	1	0
Kosovo	2016	1	0
Kosovo	2017	4	0
Kosovo	2021	1	0
Total		8	0

== Honours ==
Hysi

- Football Superleague of Kosovo (1): 2010–11

Skënderbeu Korçë

- Albanian Superliga (2): 2014–15, 2015–16
- Albanian Supercup (1): 2014
