= Tefik Osmani =

Albanian footballer (born 1985)

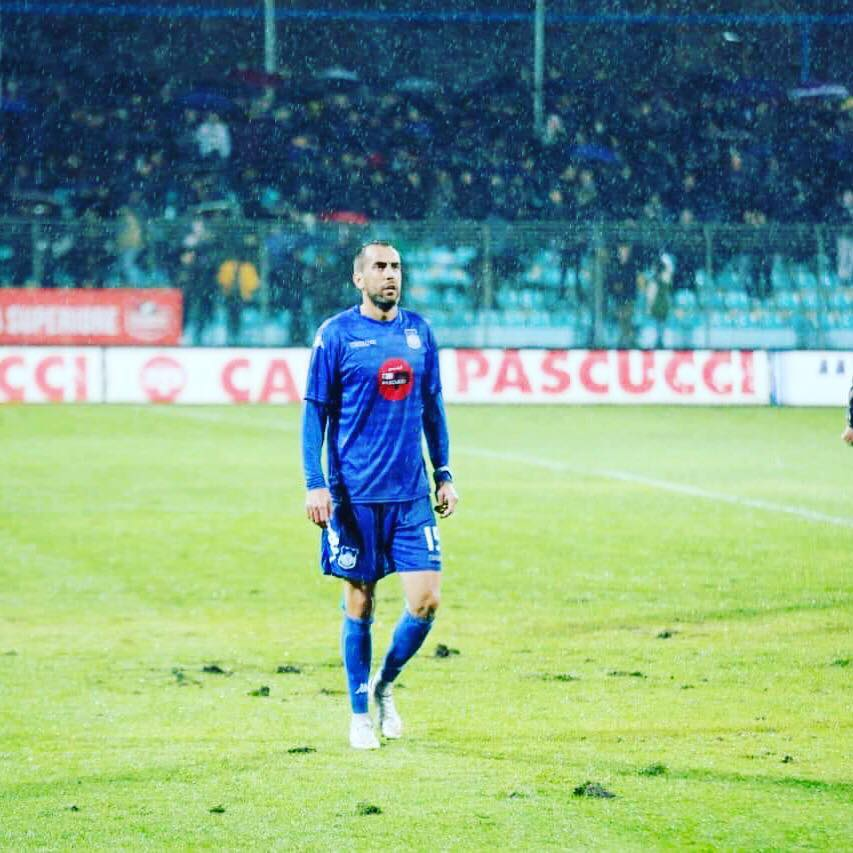

Personal information
- Date of birth: 8 June 1985 (age 41)
- Place of birth: Korçë, Albania
- Height: 1.96 m (6 ft 5 in)
- Position: Centre-back

Team information
- Current team: Vllaznia Shkodër (sporting director)

Youth career
- 2000–2002: Skënderbeu Korçë

Senior career*
Years	Team	Apps	(Gls)
2002–2003	Skënderbeu Korçë	20	(1)
2003–2004	Tomori Berat	22	(1)
2004–2007	Elbasani	58	(4)
2005–2006	→ Metalurh Zaporizhzhia (loan)	5	(0)
2007–2008	Partizani Tirana	31	(3)
2008–2011	Tirana	77	(1)
2011–2012	Teuta Durrës	23	(2)
2012–2013	Vllaznia Shkodër	13	(1)
2013–2014	Teuta Durrës	39	(4)
2014–2018	Skënderbeu Korçë	91	(1)
2018–2019	Teuta Durrës	23	(0)
2019–2020	Tirana	18	(0)

International career
2002–2003	Albania U19	3	(0)
2003–2005	Albania U21	5	(0)
2005–2013	Albania	12	(0)

Managerial career
- 2020–2023: Tirana (sporting director)
- 2021: Tirana (caretaker)
- 2023–: Vllaznia Shkodër (sporting director)
- * Club domestic league appearances and goals

Tefik Osmani (born 8 June 1985) is an Albanian professional football official and a former centre-back. He is the sporting director for Albanian club Tirana.

== Club career ==
=== Early career ===
Osmani started his career with his local club Skënderbeu Korçë as a teenager where he worked his way through the youth ranks and joined the first team prior to the 2002–03 season, where the club was competing in the Albanian Second Division, the third tier of Albanian football. He left the team after one season and joined Albanian First Division side Tomori Berat where he would stay for one year before leaving at the end of the season to join Albanian Superliga side Elbasani. Upon joining the club he became a key member of the squad and made 36 league appearances and scored twice to help the club finish as runners up in the league behind Tirana.

Following a decent second season with Tirana, he was given offers from other clubs in Albania and abroad. Most notably two unnamed clubs from Switzerland, both in the top flight. However he needed to talk to his manager and the owner of KF Tirana Refik Halili to sort out his current contract with the club.

=== Teuta Durrës ===
On 23 July 2011 he joined Teuta Durrës on a one-year contract.

=== Vllaznia Shkodër ===
Osmani signed for Vllaznia Shkodër on 16 July 2012 and was presented to the media in the very same day. He was part of the team only in the first part of 2012–13 season, collecting 13 league matches and scoring one goal. Osmani left the club during the winter transfer window in controversial fashion.

=== Teuta Durrës return ===
In January 2013, he returned to Teuta Durrës for the second part of 2012–13 season. He made his return debut on 10 February in the matchday 14 against Shkumbini Peqin, netting his side second goal in an eventual 3–0 home win.

=== Skënderbeu Korçë ===
On 29 May 2014, Osmani signed a one-year contract with his boyhood club Skënderbeu Korçë; he was presented along with Bernard Berisha, and was handed squad number 17. Shortly after, he traveled with the team in Austria for the preparation phase ahead of UEFA Champions League tie against BATE Borisov. Osmani was included in the Mirel Josa's squad list.

On 15 July, in the first leg of the second qualifying round, Osmani made an overall good performance, helping Skënderbeu Korçë to get a clean sheet at Borisov Arena. In the returning leg one week later, Osmani was again in the starting lineup, with Skënderbeu who didn't get more than a 1–1 draw at home, eliminated thus from the competition due to away goal rule.

Osmani started the domestic season by winning his first silverware with the club, the Albanian Supercup, as Skënderbeu Korçë defeated Flamurtari Vlorë at Qemal Stafa Stadium thanks to a Bakary Nimaga winner.

On 23 February 2015, during the league match against Kukësi, Osmani suffered an injury and was substituted in the 15th minute for Leonit Abazi, with the match finishing 1–1. Following the match, it was reported that he had suffered a strain injury in his right thigh that kept him outside the field for one month. He returned in action on 13 April by playing the full-90 minutes during the 5–2 thrashing of Partizani Tirana at Skënderbeu Stadium.

On 8 July 2015, Osmani agreed a contract extension with Skënderbeu Korçë, signing a contract until June 2016. He renewed the contract in the airplane while he was traveling back to Albania with the rest of the squad, becoming the first player in history to do so.

During 2016–17 season, Osmani made 26 league appearances, including 5 cup appearances and one in Albanian Supercup where the team was defeated by Kukësi. On 20 May 2017, during the decisive match against Kukësi for the championship, Osmani along with other teammates were included in a massive brawl with referee Enea Jorgji which sent him off for unsportsmanlike conduct. Everything started in the 59th minute when the referee didn't give a clear penalty to Skënderbeu after a foul inside the zone on Liridon Latifi, instead booking him for diving. Skënderbeu eventually were defeated 2–0 at Zeqir Ymeri Stadium, meaning that they have failed to win the championship for the first time in six years. Disciplinary Committee of AFA handed him an eight-game ban for all domestic competitions.

=== Second Teuta Durrës return ===
On 4 August 2018, after weeks of speculation about his future, Osmani decided to return to Teuta Durrës by signing a one-year contract. The manager Bledi Shkëmbi, who was also his former teammate at Skënderbeu and Partizani, decided to make Osmani the team captain for the 2018–19 season. Osmani begun the season on 19 August by playing full-90 minutes and helping the team get a clean-sheet in the goalless draw against Flamurtari Vlorë.

Osmani left Teuta in July 2019 after his side was eliminated from 2019–20 UEFA Europa League first qualifying round by Ventspils.

=== Tirana return ===
On 20 July 2019, Tirana announced to have signed Osmani on a deal until 2020, with the player marking his return to the capital side for the first time since 2011.

== International career ==
Osmani has represented Albania national team in 12 occasions, making his debut in a February 2005 FIFA World Cup qualification match against Ukraine. His final international was a June 2013 World Cup qualification match against Norway.

== Style of play ==
Osmani main position is centre-back. Since the beginning of 2017, under manager Ilir Daja, Osmani begun utilised as a defensive midfielder.

== Career statistics ==
=== Club ===
As of 19 August 2018

Club statistics
Club	Season	League			Cup		Europe		Other		Total	
Club	Season	Division	Apps	Goals	Apps	Goals	Apps	Goals	Apps	Goals	Apps	Goals
Skënderbeu Korçë	2002–03	Albanian First Division	20	1	0	0	—		—		20	1
Tomori Berat	2003–04	Albanian First Division	22	1	0	0	—		—		22	1
Teuta Durrës	2004–05	Albanian Superliga	—		—		2 (Note: All appearance(s) in UEFA Intertoto Cup)	0	—		2	0
Partizani Tirana	2004–05	Albanian Superliga	—		—		1 (Note: All appearance(s) in UEFA Cup)	0	—		1	0
Elbasani	2004–05	Albanian Superliga	36	2	0	0	—		—		36	2
Elbasani	2006–07	Albanian Superliga	22	2	0	0	—		—		22	2
Elbasani	Total		58	4	0	0	—		—		58	4
Metalurh Zaporizhzhia (loan)	2005–06	Ukrainian Premier League	5	0	2	0	—		—		7	0
Partizani Tirana	2007–08	Albanian Superliga	31	3	0	0	—		—		31	3
Partizani Tirana	2008–09	Albanian Superliga	—		—		2	0	—		2	0
Partizani Tirana	Total		31	3	0	0	2	0	—		34	3
Tirana	2008–09	Albanian Superliga	24	0	5	0	—		—		29	0
Tirana	2009–10	Albanian Superliga	26	0	2	0	2 (Note: All appearance(s) in UEFA Champions League)	0	0	0	30	0
Tirana	2010–11	Albanian Superliga	27	1	5	0	4 (Note: All appearance(s) in UEFA Europa League)	0	1 (Note: Appearance in Albanian Supercup)	0	37	1
Tirana	2011–12	Albanian Superliga	—		—		1	0	0	0	1	0
Tirana	Total		77	1	12	0	7	0	1	0	97	1
Teuta Durrës	2011–12	Albanian Superliga	23	2	4	1	—		—		27	3
Teuta Durrës	2012–13	Albanian Superliga	—		—		2	0	—		2	0
Teuta Durrës	Total		23	2	4	1	2	0	—		31	3
Vllaznia Shkodër	2012–13	Albanian Superliga	13	1	3	1	—		—		16	1
Teuta Durrës	2012–13	Albanian Superliga	12	2	2	0	—		—		14	2
Teuta Durrës	2013–14	Albanian Superliga	27	2	4	1	2	0	—		33	3
Teuta Durrës	Total		39	4	6	1	2	0	—		47	5
Skënderbeu Korçë	2014–15	Albanian Superliga	22	1	3	1	2	0	1	0	28	2
Skënderbeu Korçë	2015–16	Albanian Superliga	22	0	7	0	2 (Note: One appearance in UEFA Champions League, one in UEFA Europa League)	0	0	0	31	0
Skënderbeu Korçë	2016–17	Albanian Superliga	26	0	5	1	—		1	0	32	1
Skënderbeu Korçë	2017–18	Albanian Superliga	21	0	4	0	12	0	—		37	0
Skënderbeu Korçë	Total		91	1	19	2	16	0	2	0	128	3
Teuta Durrës	2018–19	Albanian Superliga	1	0	0	0	—		—		1	0
Career total			380	18	46	5	32	0	3	0	461	23

=== International ===
As of 7 June 2013

Appearances and goals by national team and year
National team	Year	Apps	Goals
Albania	2005	6	0
Albania	2012	3	0
Albania	2013	3	0
Total		12	0

== Honours ==
Elbasani

- Albanian Superliga: 2005–06

Tirana

- Albanian Superliga: 2008–09, 2019–20
- Albanian Cup: 2010–11

Skënderbeu Korçë

- Albanian Superliga: 2014–15, 2015–16, 2017–18
- Albanian Cup: 2017–18
- Albanian Supercup: 2014
