= Ademir (footballer, born 1985) =

Brazilian footballer

Personal information
- Full name: Ademir Ribeiro Souza
- Date of birth: 20 September 1985 (age 41)
- Place of birth: Brazil
- Height: 1.75 m (5 ft 9 in)
- Position: Defender

Team information
- Current team: Altos

Senior career*
Years	Team	Apps	(Gls)
200x–2010	Vitória da Conquista		
2010–2011	Fluminense de Feira	18	(0)
2011–2012	Atlético de Alagoinhas	19	(0)
2011–2012	Ypiranga		
2012–2016	Skënderbeu Korçë	43	(1)
2016	→ Laçi (loan)	16	(1)
2017	Jacobina	11	(0)
2017	Laçi	5	(0)
2018	Atlântico	3	(0)
2019–	Altos	0	(0)
- * Club domestic league appearances and goals as of 16 October 2017

Ademir Ribeiro Souza (born 20 September 1985) is a Brazilian professional footballer who plays as a defender for Altos.

== Club career ==
On 12 September 2012, Ademir completed a transfer to Albanian side Skënderbeu Korçë by penning a one-year contract for €50,000. In June 2013, he agreed a contract extension, signing for another year.

In January 2016, he was sent on loan to Laçi until the end of 2015–16 season as part of James Adeniyi transfer to the opposite direction. He played 16 matches during the second part of the season, scoring once, as Laçi finished 7th in championship.

In August 2017, Ademir joined Laçi but this time on a permanent transfer by signing a contract for 2017–18 season. He undergo surgery on 2 November after suffering an injury on 16 October in matchday 5 against Flamurtari Vlorë which means he would be unable to play for the rest of 2017. Ademir recovered faster than anticipated, returning in training on 24 November. He left the club on 23 December 2017 after struggling to deal with injuries.

== International career ==
In April 2013, Ademir expressed his dream to represent Albania national team through naturalization.

== Style of play ==
Ademir's natural position is right-back but he can also be deployed as midfielder.

== Personal life ==
His younger brother Marconi is also a footballer who plays in Brazil. They played together at Skënderbeu Korçë in 2014.

== Career statistics ==
As of 3 December 2017

Club statistics
Club	Season	League			Cup		Europe		Other		Total	
Club	Season	Division	Apps	Goals	Apps	Goals	Apps	Goals	Apps	Goals	Apps	Goals
Skënderbeu Korçë	2012–13	Albanian Superliga	19	1	6	0	0	0	0	0	25	1
Skënderbeu Korçë	2013–14	Albanian Superliga	15	0	1	0	6 (Note: Four appearances in UEFA Champions League, two in UEFA Europa League)	0	1 (Note: Appearance in Albanian Supercup)	0	23	0
Skënderbeu Korçë	2014–15	Albanian Superliga	0	0	0	0	1 (Note: All appearance(s) in UEFA Champions League)	0	0	0	43	1
Skënderbeu Korçë	2015–16	Albanian Superliga	9	0	5	0	5 (Note: Three appearances in UEFA Champions League, two in UEFA Europa League)	0	1	0	29	0
Skënderbeu Korçë	Total		43	1	12	0	12	0	2	0	69	1
Laçi (loan)	2015–16	Albanian Superliga	16	1	4	0	—		—		20	1
Jacobina	2017	Campeonato Brasileiro Série D	5	0	0	0	—		—		5	0
Jacobina	2017	Campeonato Baiano	6	0	0	0	—		—		6	0
Jacobina	Total		11	0	0	0	—		—		11	0
Laçi	2017–18	Albanian Superliga	5	0	6	0	—		—		11	0
Career total			81	2	16	0	12	0	2	0	111	2

== Honours ==
Skënderbeu Korçë

- Albanian Superliga: 2012–13, 2013–14, 2014–15
- Albanian Supercup: 2013, 2014
