= Marko Radaš =

Croatian footballer (born 1983)

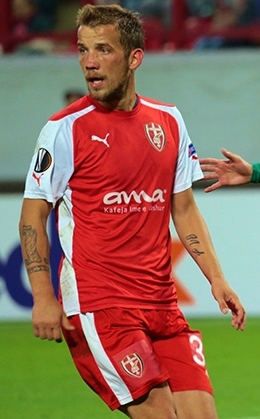

Personal information
- Full name: Marko Radaš
- Date of birth: 26 October 1983 (age 43)
- Place of birth: Zagreb, Croatia
- Height: 1.83 m (6 ft 0 in)
- Position: Right-back

Youth career
- 1999–2001: Dinamo Zagreb
- 2001–2002: Ljubljana

Senior career*
Years	Team	Apps	(Gls)
2002–2003	Ljubljana	14	(0)
2004–2005	Bela Krajina	28	(0)
2005–2007	Istra 1961	47	(5)
2007–2008	Cibalia	41	(0)
2009–2011	Vinogradar	24	(7)
2011–2019	Skënderbeu	206	(8)
2018	→ Laçi (loan)	0	(0)
2019–2020	Rudeš	14	(1)
Total		374	(21)

International career
1999	Croatia U16	1	(0)
2001	Croatia U19	4	(0)
- * Club domestic league appearances and goals as of 2 December 2022

Marko Radaš (born 26 October 1983) is a Croatian former professional footballer who played as a defender.

== Club career ==
=== Skënderbeu Korçë ===
==== 2011–14 season ====
In July 2011, Radaš completed a transfer to Albanian Superliga club Skënderbeu Korçë as a free agent. He then was included in coach Shpëtim Duro's team for the UEFA Champions League second qualifying round. He made his Skënderbeu debut as well as his first UEFA Champions League appearance on 13 July versus APOEL as the team slumped into a 0–2 home loss. Radaš also played in the returning leg one week later as Skënderbeu lost again 0–4 and was eliminated from the competition 0–6 on aggregate.

Later on 18 August, Radaš had the chance to win his first career silverware as Skënderbeu played versus Tirana at the 2011 Albanian Supercup but the lone goal of Bekim Balaj sealed the win for capital club, in a match which was infamously delayed for one hour due to clashes among fans.

Radaš made his first Albanian Superliga appearance in the opening matchday versus Tomori Berat on 10 September, playing in the first half as the Skënderbeu didn't go more than a goalless draw. Two week later during the match against Shkumbini Peqin, Radaš was blooded in the head after a collision with an opposite defender, which forced him to left the match in 31st minute. He however returned on action for the following league match at Laçi.

He scored his maiden Skënderbeu goal on 12 February of the following year with a free-kick in the 2–4 away win against Tomori Berat. He netted the second of the season on 4 April 2012 during the 2011–12 Albanian Cup first leg semi-final match against Kastrioti Krujë to bring the team closer to the final. He finished his first season in Korçë by making 38 appearances in all competitions, including 24 in league as Skënderbeu clinched the championship for the second season. He also made 12 cup appearances as Skënderbeu fall in the final to Tirana at extra time.

==== 2012–13 season ====
Radaš started his second season in Albania by playing in the two-legged match versus Debreceni for the Champions League second qualifying round, unable to avoid the elimination despite winning 1–0 at home in the first leg. He was the protagonist in the 2012 Albanian Supercup once again against Tirana where his 90th minute owngoal gave Tirana the 1–2 win and the trophy.

His only goal of the season came 4 February 2013 in the 5–1 home win against Kastrioti Krujë in the 2012–13 Albanian Cup Group A match. Four days later, he recorded his 50th appearance for Skënderbeu in the 0–1 home loss to Vllaznia Shkodër in the Albanian Superliga matchday 14. Radaš concluded his second season with the club by making 24 appearances in all competitions, including 14 in league as the team clinched another championship. In cup, Radaš contributed with 7 matches as the team was eliminated to semi-finals by underdogs of Bylis Ballsh.

==== 2013–14 season ====
In July 2013, Radaš produced two strong performances by helping Skënderbeu keep two clean-sheets in the 2013–14 UEFA Champions League second qualifying round over Neftçi. Skënderbeu progressed for the first time in history in third qualifying round 1–0 on aggregate after a win on extra-time at Skënderbeu Stadium in the second leg. Then the team was eliminated by Shakhter Karagandy 5–3 on aggregate, which brought the elimination from the Champions League.

Elimination from Champions League sent Skënderbeu at UEFA Europa League play-off round, where the team faced Chornomorets Odesa. Skënderbeu lost the first leg 0–1 but won the second with the same results which sent the match at penalty shootouts; Radaš missed his attempt in an eventual 6–7 loss which eliminated Skënderbeu.

Radaš won his second Albanian Supercup trophy on 17 August as Skënderbeu defeated 1–0 Flamurtari Vlorë at Qemal Stafa Stadium.

==== 2014–15 season ====
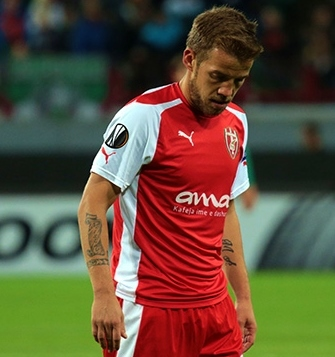
Radaš in action for Skënderbeu Korçë

Radaš started his fourth Skënderbeu Korçë season by playing in a two-legged match against BATE Borisov in the Champions League second qualifying round, scoring his team's only goal in the 1–1 draw at Skënderbeu Stadium in the second match, but in an eventual exit due to away goal rule after the first match had finished in a goalless draw.

He started the domestic season on 17 August 2014 by playing full-90 minutes 1–0 win against Flamurtari Vlorë for the Albanian Supercup, winning his first silverware of the season. Six days later, Radaš played in team's 1–0 win against Elbasani in the first week.

On 13 December 2014, Radaš received a straight red-card in Skënderbeu Korçë's 2–0 away defeat to Tirana for an altercation with Selemani Ndikumana. He was later suspended for 6 matches for his behaviour by the Disciplinary Committee of AFA. He was also suspended by his club.

Radaš returned on the field on 25 January of the following year in the 4–1 away to Elbasani. He scored his first goal of the season in the 3–1 home win against Vllaznia Shkodër, scoring with a free-kick. It was his first goal in over a year.

Radaš scored his second goal of the season on 13 April in Skënderbeu Korçë's 5–2 humbling of Partizani Tirana at Skënderbeu Stadium, bringing the team closer to the title. The club finished the season by winning the league title for the fifth consecutive year, while Radaš managed to play 40 matches in all competitions, including 33 in league.

==== 2015–16 season ====
Radaš played every single minute in Skënderbeu Korçë's historic run in Champions League's qualifying rounds, where the team managed to eliminate Crusaders and Milsami Orhei, becoming the first Albanian team to reach the play-off round, only to be eliminated by Dinamo Zagreb with the aggregate 6–2.

Radaš missed the team's opening league match of the season on 9 September against Vllaznia Shkodër due to an injury, but returned three days later to play in the 2–0 away win to newly promoted side Tërbuni Pukë.

On 7 February 2016, Radaš was sent-off during the 3–1 home win against Kukësi, receiving a second yellow-card in the last moments of the match.

On 8 May 2016, in the last minutes of the league match against Teuta Durrës, which finished in a 1–1 away draw, Radaš suffered a knee-injury, plucked his ligament, and was stretchered off the field. Following the examinations, it was reported that Radaš would miss the remaining two league matches of the season. Skënderbeu Korçë, however, won its six consecutive league title and Radaš won his fifth.

==== 2016–17 season ====
On 16 July 2016, Radaš signed a new one-year extension to his contract, lengthening his Skënderbeu Korçë career to 6 seasons.

==== 2017–18 season ====
Radaš was confirmed for the 2017–18 season which was his 7th in Albania. In the summer of 2017, Radaš was a regular starter in Skënderbeu's 2017–18 UEFA Europa League qualifying rounds campaign, as the team achieved group stage for the second time ever and also become the first Albanian club to pass four rounds. He made nine appearances during the qualifying rounds, all of them as starter, collecting 750 minutes. He scored his first goal for the 2017–18 season on 19 November in the 1–1 home draw versus Kamza; he scored from a free-kick after narrowly missing the first two attempts.

He concluded the 2017–18 season by making 30 league appearances as Skënderbeu clinched the title for the 8th in history. In cup, he played four times, including the final versus Laçi, where he was sent off in 90th minute, as the team triumphed by winning 1–0 at Elbasan Arena, thus completing the domestic double for the first time ever.

==== 2018–19 season ====
On 8 July 2018, Radaš signed a contract for the new season and was named the captain by new manager Orges Shehi. Later on 23 July, club president Ardian Takaj announced that Radaš will be sent on loan at fellow Albanian Superliga club Laçi for their 2018–19 UEFA Europa League second qualifying round tie versus Norway's Molde. He made his debut for the club in the first leg, making a poorly-received performance as Laçi lost 3–0 at Aker Stadion. In the returning leg Radaš did not improve his performance and received a yellow card in 40th minute after conceding a penalty; Laçi lost the match 0–2 and was eliminated from the competition.

== Personal life ==
Radaš is married and has a son and a daughter.

== Career statistics ==
=== Club ===
As of 2 August 2018

Club statistics
Club	Season	League			Cup		Europe		Other		Total	
Club	Season	Division	Apps	Goals	Apps	Goals	Apps	Goals	Apps	Goals	Apps	Goals
Skënderbeu Korçë	2011–12	Albanian Superliga	24	1	12	1	2 (Note: All appearance(s) in UEFA Champions League)	0	1 (Note: Appearance in Albanian Supercup)	0	38	2
Skënderbeu Korçë	2012–13	Albanian Superliga	14	0	7	1	2	0	1	0	24	1
Skënderbeu Korçë	2013–14	Albanian Superliga	27	1	8	0	6 (Note: Four appearances in UEFA Champions League, two in UEFA Europa League)	0	1	0	42	1
Skënderbeu Korçë	2014–15	Albanian Superliga	33	2	4	0	2	1	1	0	40	3
Skënderbeu Korçë	2015–16	Albanian Superliga	25	1	2	0	11 (Note: Six appearances in UEFA Champions League, five in UEFA Europa League)	0	0	0	38	1
Skënderbeu Korçë	2016–17	Albanian Superliga	28	1	5	1	—		1	0	34	2
Skënderbeu Korçë	2017–18	Albanian Superliga	30	2	4	0	12 (Note: All appearance(s) in UEFA Europa League)	0	—		46	2
Skënderbeu Korçë	2018–19	Albanian Superliga	0	0	0	0	—		—		0	0
Skënderbeu Korçë	Total		181	8	41	3	35	1	5	0	262	12
Laçi (loan)	2018–19	Albanian Superliga	—		—		2	0	—		2	0
Career total			181	8	38	3	37	1	5	0	264	12

== Honours ==
=== Club ===
Skënderbeu Korçë

- Albanian Superliga: 2011–12, 2012–13, 2013–14, 2014–15, 2015–16, 2017–18
- Albanian Cup: 2017–18
- Albanian Supercup: 2013, 2014

=== Individual ===
- Albanian Superliga Player of the Month: April 2012
