= 2018–19 Kategoria Superiore =

Kategoria Superiore
- Season: 2018–19
- Dates: 17 August 2018 – 30 May 2019
- Champions: Partizani; 16th title
- Relegated: Kastrioti
- Champions League: Partizani
- Europa League: Kukësi; Laçi; Teuta
- Matches: 180
- Goals: 375 (2.08 per match)
- Top goalscorer: Reginaldo (13 goals)
- Biggest home win: Laçi 5–0 Teuta (6 April 2019)
- Biggest away win: Kastrioti 0–4 Teuta (16 December 2018); Luftëtari 1–5 Kastrioti (27 January 2019)
- Highest scoring: Luftëtari 1–5 Kastrioti (27 January 2019)
- Longest winning run: 5 matches Partizani; Skënderbeu
- Longest unbeaten run: 15 matches Teuta
- Longest winless run: 11 matches Kastrioti
- Longest losing run: 7 matches Kastrioti
- All statistics correct as of 30 May 2019.

The 2018–19 Kategoria Superiore was the 80th official season, or 83rd season of top-tier football in Albania (including three unofficial championships during World War II) and the 19th season under the name Kategoria Superiore. The season began on 17 August 2018 and ended on 30 May 2019. Partizani, won the league title on 12 May 2019 with 3 matches to spare.

The winners of this season's Superiore earned a place in the first qualifying round of the 2019−20 Champions League, with the second and third placed clubs earning a place in the first qualifying round of the 2019−20 Europa League.

== Teams ==
Two clubs earned promotion from the Kategoria e Parë, Kastrioti and Tirana, joined the Superiore this season. Lushnja and Vllaznia were relegated at the conclusion of last season, the latter for the second time in their history.

=== Locations ===
Locations of the 2018–19 Kategoria Superiore teams

Team	Home city	Stadium	Capacity	2017–18 season
Flamurtari	Vlorë	Flamurtari Stadium	8,200	6th
Kamza	Kamëz	Kamëz Stadium	5,200	7th
Kastrioti	Krujë	Redi Maloku Stadium	3,000	Runner-up (Kategoria e Parë)
Kukësi	Kukës	Kamëz Stadium	5,500	Runner-up
Laçi	Laç	Laçi Stadium	2,300	4th
Luftëtari	Gjirokastër	Gjirokastra Stadium	8,400	3rd
Partizani	Tirana	Selman Stërmasi Stadium	9,600	5th
Skënderbeu	Korçë	Skënderbeu Stadium	8,724	Champion
Teuta	Durrës	Niko Dovana Stadium	12,400	8th
Tirana	Tirana	Selman Stërmasi Stadium	9,600	Champion (Kategoria e Parë)

- (1) Partizani will play their 2018–19 home games at the Selman Stërmasi Stadium in Tirana. The club's former home ground, the Qemal Stafa Stadium, was demolished and their new home ground at the Partizani Complex is currently under construction.
- (2) Kastrioti will play their 2018–19 home games at the Redi Maloku Stadium in Fushë-Krujë.
- (3) Kukësi will play their 2018–19 home games at the Kamëz Stadium in Kamëz.

=== Stadiums ===
Flamurtari	Kamza	Kastrioti	Kukësi	Laçi
Flamurtari Stadium	Kamëz Stadium	Redi Maloku Stadium	Kamëz Stadium	Laçi Stadium
Capacity: 8,200	Capacity: 5,500	Capacity: 3,000	Capacity: 5,500	Capacity: 2,300
Luftëtari	Partizani	Skënderbeu	Teuta	Tirana
Gjirokastra Stadium	Selman Stërmasi Stadium	Skënderbeu Stadium	Niko Dovana Stadium	Selman Stërmasi Stadium
Capacity: 8,400	Capacity: 9,600	Capacity: 12,343	Capacity: 12,040	Capacity: 9,600

=== Personnel and kits ===
Note: Flags indicate national team as has been defined under FIFA eligibility rules. Players and Managers may hold more than one non-FIFA nationality.

Team	President	Manager	Captain	Kit manufacturer	Shirt sponsor
Flamurtari	(Albania) Sinan Idrizi	(Albania) Ilir Daja	(North Macedonia) Artim Pollozhani	Kappa	−
Kamza	(Albania) Naim Qarri	(Albania) Gentian Stojku	(Albania) Sebino Plaku	Uhlsport	Spital Continental
Kastrioti	(Albania) Petro Kumi	(Albania) Bledar Devolli	(Albania) Emiliano Çela	Uhlsport	Universal
Kukësi	(Albania) Safet Gjici	(Albania) Ernest Gjoka	(Albania) Ylli Shameti	Macron	Kevin Construction
Laçi	(Albania) Pashk Lasa	(Albania) Sulejman Starova	(Albania) Gentian Selmani	Uhlsport	Pavin Caffe
Luftëtari	(Albania) Grigor Tavo	(Albania) Julian Ahmataj	(Albania) Behar Ramadani	Legea	Replay
Partizani	(Albania) Gazmend Demi	(Albania) Skënder Gega	(Albania) Alban Hoxha	Joma	MCN
Skënderbeu	(Albania) Ardian Takaj	(Albania) Orges Shehi	(Croatia) Marko Radaš	Puma	Ama Cafè
Teuta	(Albania) Edmond Hasanbelliu	(Albania) Bledi Shkëmbi	(Albania) Tefik Osmani	Kappa	Caffè Pascucci
Tirana	(Albania) Refik Halili	(Albania) Ardian Mema	(Albania) Erando Karabeci	Macron	−

=== Managerial changes ===
Team	Outgoing manager	Manner of departure	Date of vacancy	Position in table	Incoming manager	Date of appointment
Kamza	(Albania) Julian Ahmataj	Mutual consent	25 May 2018	Pre-season	(Albania) Bledar Devolli	9 July 2018
Kastrioti	(Albania) Samuel Nikaj	Mutual consent	28 May 2018	Pre-season	(Albania) Elvis Plori	28 May 2018
Laçi	(Albania) Gentian Mezani	Resigned	1 June 2018	Pre-season	(Albania) Artan Mërgjyshi	7 August 2018
Luftëtari	(Albania) Hasan Lika	Resigned	1 June 2018	Pre-season	(Slovenia) Miloš Kostić	5 June 2018
Teuta	(Albania) Gentian Begeja	Mutual consent	4 June 2018	Pre-season	(Albania) Bledi Shkëmbi	4 June 2018
Partizani	(Albania) Klevis Dalipi	Mutual consent	16 June 2018	Pre-season	(Albania) Skënder Gega	18 June 2018
Skënderbeu	(Albania) Ilir Daja	Resigned	19 June 2018	Pre-season	(Albania) Orges Shehi	5 July 2018
Flamurtari	(Albania) Ardian Behari	End of caretaker spell	13 July 2018	Pre-season	(Albania) Ilir Daja	13 July 2018
Kamza	(Albania) Bledar Devolli	Sacked	2 September 2018	7th	(Albania) Klodian Duro	4 September 2018
Luftëtari	(Slovenia) Miloš Kostić	Mutual consent	20 September 2018	10th	(Albania) Gentian Mezani	20 September 2018
Tirana	(Brazil) Zé Maria	Mutual consent	11 October 2018	7th	(Albania) Ardian Mema	12 October 2018
Kastrioti	(Albania) Elvis Plori	Resigned	21 October 2018	10th	(Albania) Stavri Nica	22 October 2018
Laçi	(Albania) Artan Mërgjyshi	Resigned	30 October 2018	4th	(Albania) Migen Memelli	31 October 2018
Kamza	(Albania) Klodian Duro	Mutual decision	8 November 2018	9th	(Albania) Ernest Gjoka	15 November 2018
Laçi	(Albania) Migen Memelli	End of caretaker spell	14 December 2018	5th	(Albania) Besnik Prenga	14 December 2018
Kastrioti	(Albania) Stavri Nica	Resigned	23 December 2018	10th	(Albania) Bledar Devolli	7 January 2019
Luftëtari	(Albania) Gentian Mezani	Sacked	28 January 2019	8th	(Albania) Julian Ahmataj	29 January 2019
Kamza	(Albania) Ernest Gjoka	Resigned	17 February 2019	10th	(Albania) Gentian Stojku	19 February 2019
Laçi	(Albania) Besnik Prenga	Resigned	15 March 2019	4th	(Albania) Sulejman Starova	15 March 2019
Kukësi	(Albania) Armando Cungu	Mutual consent	19 March 2019	2nd	(Albania) Ramadan Ndreu	19 March 2019
Kukësi	(Albania) Ramadan Ndreu	End of caretaker spell	6 April 2019	2nd	(Albania) Ernest Gjoka	6 April 2019

== League table ==
Pos	Team	Pld	W	D	L	GF	GA	GD	Pts	Qualification or relegation
1	Partizani (C)	36	20	10	6	45	22	+23	70	Qualification for the Champions League first qualifying round
2	Kukësi	36	17	8	11	42	29	+13	59	Qualification for the Europa League first qualifying round (Note: Since the winners of the 2018–19 Albanian Cup, Kukësi, qualified for European competition based on league position, the spot awarded to the cup winners was passed down to the sixth-placed team, Laçi, since the fourth-placed team and the fifth-placed team failed to obtain a UEFA license.)
3	Teuta	36	15	12	9	43	36	+7	57	Qualification for the Europa League first qualifying round
4	Skënderbeu (Note: In March 2018, Skënderbeu was handed a 10-year ban from UEFA club competitions over match fixing.)	36	17	4	15	45	30	+15	55	
5	Flamurtari (Note: Flamurtari failed to obtain a UEFA license.)	36	15	9	12	35	32	+3	54	
6	Laçi	36	12	13	11	33	30	+3	49	Qualification for the Europa League first qualifying round
7	Tirana	36	12	11	13	44	35	+9	47	
8	Luftëtari	36	13	8	15	37	39	−2	47	
9	Kastrioti (R)	36	12	6	18	35	53	−18	42	Relegation to the 2019–20 Kategoria e Parë
10	Kamza (Note: Kamza was excluded from the league and relegated to the Kategoria e Dytë for the next season, after a violent incident during a match against Laçi in the 24th round.) (R, D)	36	4	5	27	13	66	−53	17	Excluded from the league

Source: Albanian Football Association, Soccerway
Rules for classification: 1) Points; 2) Head-to-head points; 3) Head-to-head goal difference; 4) Head-to-head goals scored; 5) Goal difference; 6) Goals scored; 7) Draw.
(C) Champions; (D) Disqualified; (R) Relegated

=== Positions by round ===
Team ╲ Round	1	2	3	4	5	6	7	8	9	10	11	12	13	14	15	16	17	18	19	20	21	22	23	24	25	26	27	28	29	30	31	32	33	34	35	36
Partizani	9	5	3	2	3	2	1	1	1	2	2	1	1	1	1	1	1	1	1	1	1	1	1	1	1	1	1	1	1	1	1	1	1	1	1	1
Kukësi	5	8	6	4	2	1	4	4	4	3	3	5	5	5	4	3	3	2	2	2	2	3	2	2	2	2	2	2	2	2	2	2	2	2	2	2
Teuta	6	7	5	7	8	6	7	6	6	5	5	4	3	3	3	4	2	3	3	3	3	2	3	3	3	3	3	4	4	4	4	4	3	3	4	3
Skënderbeu (Note: In March 2018, Skënderbeu was handed a 10-year ban from UEFA club competitions over match fixing.)	1	1	1	1	1	3	2	2	2	1	1	2	2	2	2	2	4	5	5	5	4	5	5	5	5	6	6	6	5	6	5	6	6	6	5	4
Flamurtari (Note: Flamurtari failed to obtain a UEFA license.)	7	3	2	3	5	5	5	5	5	6	6	6	6	6	6	6	6	6	6	6	6	6	6	6	6	4	5	3	3	3	3	3	5	4	3	5
Laçi (Note: Since the winners of the 2018–19 Albanian Cup, Kukësi, qualified for European competition based on league position, the spot awarded to the cup winners was passed down to the sixth-placed team, Laçi, since the fourth-placed team and the fifth-placed team failed to obtain a UEFA license.)	4	2	4	5	4	4	3	3	3	4	4	3	4	4	5	5	5	4	4	4	5	4	4	4	4	5	4	5	6	5	6	5	4	5	6	6
Tirana	10	9	9	8	7	8	6	7	7	7	7	7	8	8	8	7	8	7	7	7	7	7	7	7	7	8	8	8	8	8	8	7	8	8	8	7
Luftëtari	8	10	10	10	10	10	8	9	9	8	8	8	7	7	7	8	7	8	8	8	8	8	8	8	8	7	7	7	7	7	7	8	7	7	7	8
Kastrioti	3	4	8	9	9	9	10	10	10	10	10	10	10	10	9	10	10	10	10	9	9	9	9	9	9	9	9	9	9	9	9	9	9	9	9	9
Kamza (Note: Kamza was excluded from the league and relegated to the Kategoria e Dytë for the next season, after a violent incident during a match against Laçi in the 24th round.)	2	6	7	6	6	7	9	8	8	9	9	9	9	9	10	9	9	9	9	10	10	10	10	10	10	10	10	10	10	10	10	10	10	10	10	10

Leader and UEFA Champions League first qualifying round
UEFA Europa League first qualifying round
UEFA Europa League first qualifying round
2019–20 Kategoria e Parë

== Results ==
Clubs will play each other four times for a total of 36 matches each.

=== First half of season ===
Home \ Away	FLA	KAM	KAS	KUK	LAÇ	LUF	PAR	SKË	TEU	TIR
Flamurtari	—	1–0	4–0	1–0	1–0	0–0	1–0	0–2	1–1	1–0
Kamza	2–2	—	2–0	0–2	0–1	1–0	0–1	1–0	1–3	1–1
Kastrioti	1–0	3–0	—	1–2	1–1	0–2	1–2	0–3	0–4	2–3
Kukësi	1–2	1–0	2–0	—	1–1	1–0	0–1	1–0	1–1	3–1
Laçi	1–0	0–0	2–1	0–1	—	2–1	0–0	2–0	0–3	2–1
Luftëtari	0–1	1–0	0–1	0–1	0–1	—	1–1	0–2	3–1	2–1
Partizani	2–0	1–0	1–0	0–0	1–0	2–1	—	0–2	3–0	2–1
Skënderbeu	1–0	2–0	1–0	1–0	1–1	2–3	1–0	—	0–1	1–1
Teuta	0–0	1–0	2–0	0–1	1–1	1–0	1–1	2–0	—	2–1
Tirana	1–0	0–1	4–0	0–0	0–1	3–1	0–1	1–1	0–0	—

Source: Albanian Football Association
Legend: Blue = home team win; Yellow = draw; Red = away team win.

=== Second half of season ===
Home \ Away	FLA	KAM	KAS	KUK	LAÇ	LUF	PAR	SKË	TEU	TIR
Flamurtari	—	3–0^{1}	1–1	1–2	1–0	1–1	0–3	2–0	3–1	1–0
Kamza	0–3^{1}	—	0–1	0–3^{1}	1–1	0–3^{1}	0–1	0–3^{1}	0–3^{1}	0–3^{1}
Kastrioti	2–0	3–0^{1}	—	2–1	1–1	1–0	1–1	2–1	2–1	1–0
Kukësi	1–2	3–2	3–1	—	0–0	3–0	1–1	0–3	0–0	0–1
Laçi	0–0	3–0^{1}	1–1	0–1	—	0–2	1–0	1–0	5–0	1–3
Luftëtari	0–0	3–0^{1}	1–5	3–2	1–0	—	1–1	1–0	1–0	1–1
Partizani	3–1	3–0^{1}	2–0	1–1	1–1	1–3	—	2–0	3–0	2–1
Skënderbeu	2–0	3–0^{1}	4–0	1–0	2–1	2–0	0–1	—	0–2	1–2
Teuta	1–1	0–0	1–0	2–1	2–0	0–0	2–0	2–2	—	1–3
Tirana	3–0	4–1	0–0	0–2	1–1	1–1	0–0	1–0	1–1	—

Source: Albanian Football Association
Legend: Blue = home team win; Yellow = draw; Red = away team win.
- ^{1} The opponents of Kamza awarded a 3–0 w/o win each.

== Season statistics ==
=== Scoring ===
==== Top scorers ====
Rank	Player	Club	Goals
1	(Mozambique) Reginaldo	Kukësi	13
2	(Albania) Edon Hasani	Tirana	12
2	(Albania) Vasil Shkurtaj	Luftëtari/Kukësi	12
4	(Albania) Ndriçim Shtubina	Laçi	10
4	(Brazil) Roger	Kastrioti	10
6	(Ghana) Latif Amadu	Teuta	9
7	(Albania) Dejvi Bregu	Skënderbeu	8
7	(Albania) Gjergji Muzaka	Skënderbeu	8
7	(Albania) Jasir Asani	Partizani	8

==== Hat-tricks ====
Player	For	Against	Result	Date	Ref
(Mozambique) Reginaldo	Kukësi	Tirana	3–1 (H)	2 September 2018	

=== Discipline ===
- Most yellow cards: 12
  - (Albania) Idriz Batha (Flamurtari)
  - (Croatia) Marko Radaš (Skënderbeu)
- Most red cards: 2
  - (North Macedonia) Bojan Najdenov (Laçi)
  - (Kosovo) Leonit Abazi (Skënderbeu)
  - (Guinea) Lancinet Sidibe (Teuta)

== Attendances ==
#	Club	Average
1	Partizani	2,986
2	Tirana	2,308
3	Skënderbeu	1,833
4	Flamurtari	1,624
5	Teuta	889
6	Kastrioti	865
7	Kamza	760
8	Luftëtari	694
9	Laçi	656
10	Kukësi	633

== See also ==
- Kategoria Superiore
- Kategoria e Parë
- Albanian Cup
