= 2014 Albanian Supercup =

- Event: Albanian Supercup
Skënderbeu Korçë	KS Flamurtari
1	0
- Date: August 17, 2014
- Venue: Qemal Stafa Stadium, Tirana
- Referee: Lorenc Jemini
- Attendance: 2,200
- Weather: dry

The 2014 Albanian Supercup was the 21st edition of the Albanian Supercup since its establishment in 1989. The match was contested between the 2013–14 Albanian Cup winners KS Flamurtari and the 2013–14 Albanian Superliga champions Skënderbeu Korçë.

The cup was won by Skënderbeu Korçë, 1–0. This was the second consecutive Supercup win for Skënderbeu Korçë.

== Details ==
17 August 2014
19:00 CEST

Skënderbeu Korçë	1–0	Flamurtari Vlorë
Nimaga 52'	Report

Qemal Stafa Stadium, Tirana
Attendance: 2,200
Referee: Lorenc Jemini

GK	1	(Albania) Orges Shehi
DF	32	(Albania) Kristi Vangjeli	(yellow card) 31'
DF	17	(Albania) Tefik Osmani		(substituted off) 65'
DF	33	(Croatia) Marko Radas
DF	3	(Albania) Renato Arapi
MF	19	(Mali) Bakary Nimaga
MF	10	(Albania) Bledi Shkëmbi (c)	(yellow card) 88'
MF	7	(Albania) Gerhard Progni
MF	14	(Albania) Leonit Abazi		(substituted off) 46'
FW	29	(Albania) Fatjon Sefa
FW	30	(Albania) Andi Ribaj		(substituted off) 75'
Substitutes:
P	12	(Albania) Erjon Llapanji
DF	5	(Kosovo) Bajram Jashanica		(substituted on) 65'
MF	9	(Albania) Enkel Alikaj
MF	23	(Kosovo) Bernard Berisha		(substituted on) 46'
MF	2	(Albania) Amarildo Dimo	(yellow card) 86'	(substituted on) 75'
FW	24	(Albania) Artnant Tahirllari
FW	8	(Kosovo) Samir Sahiti
Manager:
(Albania) Mirel Josa

GK	1	(Albania) Ilion Lika
DF	13	(Albania) Polizoi Arbëri
DF	5	(Brazil) Douglas	(yellow card) 49'
DF	11	(Albania) Franc Veliu (c)	(yellow card) 85'
DF	7	(Albania) Gledi Mici
MF	27	(Albania) Gilman Lika	(yellow card) 33'
MF	10	(North Macedonia) Nijaz Lena	(yellow card) 76'
MF	17	(Albania) Bruno Telushi		(substituted off) 70'
MF	20	(Albania) Taulant Kuqi		(substituted off) 46'
FW	14	(Albania) Gjergji Muzaka
FW	21	(Albania) Arbër Abilaliaj		(substituted off) 82'
Substitutes:
GK	89	(Albania) Klodian Xhelilaj
DF	4	(Albania) Hektor Idrizaj
DF	28	(Albania) Artan Sakaj
DF	77	(Albania) Agim Meto
CC	14	(Albania) Erjon Vucaj		(substituted on) 70'
FW	9	(Brazil) Gilberto		(substituted on) 46'
FW	23	(Albania) Ardit Shehaj		(substituted on) 82'
Manager:
(Albania) Ernest Gjoka

== See also ==
- 2013–14 Albanian Superliga
- 2013–14 Albanian Cup
