= Amarildo Dimo =

Albanian footballer

Personal information
- Full name: Amarildo Dimo
- Date of birth: 25 August 1982 (age 44)
- Place of birth: Fier, Albania
- Height: 1.81 m (5 ft 11 in)
- Position: Defender

Team information
- Current team: Egnatia
- Number: 22

Youth career
- Apolonia Fier

Senior career*
Years	Team	Apps	(Gls)
2003–2006	Luftëtari	20	(3)
2006–2008	Bylis	44	(5)
2008–2009	Luftëtari	27	(5)
2009–2012	Bylis	56	(27)
2012–2015	Skënderbeu	56	(3)
2015–2018	Apolonia	90	(14)
2018–	Egnatia	17	(4)
- * Club domestic league appearances and goals as of 8 March 2019

Amarildo Dimo (born 25 August 1982) is an Albanian footballer who has played as a defender for Albanian club Egnatia.

== Club career ==
On 5 January 2015, Dimo returned to his hometown club Apolonia Fier after 15 years, join the Albanian Superliga strugglers until the end of the season in their bid to escape relegation. He officially become a free agent on 1 July 2018 after his contract run out and the club decided not to offer him the renew, thus leaving the club after three-and-a-half seasons.

In July 2018, Dimo signed with fellow Albanian First Division side Egnatia. He was given squad number 22 and made his competitive debut in the opening matchday of 2018–19 Albanian First Division against Bylis Ballsh where he scored the match's only goal. The goal was followed by another one in the second matchday, a 2–1 win at Elbasani which gave Egnatia the championship lead with Dimo netting the opener with a penalty kick.

== Honours ==
Skënderbeu Korçë

- Albanian Superliga: 2011–12, 2012–13, 2013–14
- Albanian Supercup: 2013, 2014
