= Enkeleid Alikaj =

Albanian footballer

Personal information
- Full name: Enkeleid Alikaj
- Date of birth: 27 December 1981 (age 44)
- Place of birth: Tirana, Albania
- Height: 1.80 m (5 ft 11 in)
- Position: Midfielder

Senior career*
Years	Team	Apps	(Gls)
2001–2007	Dinamo Tirana	57	(0)
2003	→ Apolonia Fier (loan)	24	(2)
2005	→ Partizani (loan)	20	(0)
2007	Partizani	8	(0)
2007–2008	Besa Kavajë	35	(4)
2009	Teuta Durrës	14	(1)
2009–2010	Vllaznia	20	(2)
2010–2012	Kastrioti	54	(7)
2012–2013	Kukësi	32	(2)
2014–2015	Skënderbeu	32	(1)
2015–2016	Kastrioti	25	(4)
2016	Elbasani	10	(0)
2017–2018	Dinamo Tirana	11	(1)

International career
2000–2003	Albania U21	6	(0)
- * Club domestic league appearances and goals as of 16 May 2017

Enkeleid Alikaj (born 27 December 1981), known as Enkel Alikaj, is an Albanian retired professional footballer who last played as a midfielder for Albanian club Dinamo Tirana in the Albanian First Division.

== Club career ==
=== Early career ===
In March 2006, while still playing for Dinamo Tirana, Alikaj was given permission to go to Norway on a one-week trial at Vålerenga Fotball. Following the trial he was not given a contract after Lars Bohinen, sporting director of the club at that time, claimed that he was not "good enough" to play for the team.

=== Vllaznia Shkodër ===
On 30 July 2009, Alikaj joined Vllaznia Shkodër on a one-year contract. He was presented a day later, stating: "To be part of a team like Vllaznia it's a pleasure for every player."

=== Kastrioti Krujë ===
After one season in Shkodër, on 1 September 2010, Alikaj completed a transfer to fellow Albanian Superliga side Kastrioti Krujë by signing a one-year contract. Alikaj made his first appearance for Kastrioti in the opening league match against Shkumbini Peqin, playing for 54 minutes as the team kicked off the new season with a 2–2 at the neutral ground of Qemal Stafa Stadium. He missed the second matchday because the club gave him permission to go to Azerbaijan on trial with an unknown team.

=== Kukësi ===
On 9 August 2012, Alikaj joined newly promoted Albanian Superliga club Kukësi by signing a contract until the end of the 2012–13 season. Alikaj was part of the team which made history by becoming the first Albanian team to reach the UEFA Europa League play-off round, and also the first Albanian team to pass more than a round in the competition. He contributed with seven matches as Kukësi was eliminated by Trabzonspor.

=== Skënderbeu Korçë ===
On 31 January 2014, one day after leaving Kukësi, Alikaj joined the rivals of Skënderbeu Korçë by signing until the end of the season, turning down offers from clubs such as Partizani Tirana and Kastrioti Krujë. He played his first match with the new team two days later against his former side Vllaznia Shkodër, entering in the last 24 minutes of a 2–1 home win, helping Skënderbeu to extend the lead gap to 9 points.

After winning his second consecutive title with Skënderbeu Korçë, he left the club at the end of the 2014–15 season through a mutual agreement to terminate his contract which was due to expire a year later in 2016.

=== Kastrioti Krujë return ===
On 27 August 2015, Alikaj completed a transfer to Kastrioti Krujë by signing a one-year contract despite being the target of several top flight clubs. During the 2014–15 season, he served as team captain, and concluded the season with 27 appearances, including 25 in league, scoring 4 goals in the process, as Kastrioti failed to clinch a spot for the Albanian Superliga next season.

=== Elbasani ===
On 13 September 2016, Alikaj joined fellow Albanian First Division side Elbasani by signing a one-year contract, having begun training with the team days before. In December 2016, he along with the rest of the team boycotted the training after not getting paid for months. In an interview, he stated that the club didn't pay him, and that he was one of the five players to urge other players to boycott the training. He was suspended by the club for his actions along with the other four players. Shortly after, he officially terminated his contract with the club, becoming a free agent in the process.

=== Dinamo Tirana return ===
In January 2017, Alikaj begun training with Dinamo Tirana. On 2 February, he officially returned to the club for the first time after 11 years by signing until the end of the season. He made his return debut two days later in the match against Sopoti Librazhd by playing in the last 30 minutes of a goalless draw. Alikaj scored his first goal for Dinamo in his second appearance six days later, netting the final goal of a 3–1 win at Apolonia Fier.

== International career ==
A former Albania youth international, Alikaj made his competitive debut with the under-21 squad on 1 April 2003 against Republic of Ireland for the qualifiers of 2004 UEFA European Under-21 Championship. He played the whole match as Albania won 1–0 at Selman Stërmasi Stadium thanks to an Erjon Rizvanolli winner. Alikaj made only one appearance during the tournament, as Albania had the best result since 1984 UEFA European Under-21 Championship, when it had won the group, as it left two teams behind (Republic of Ireland and Georgia), but was preceded by Switzerland and Russia, and thus failed to qualify to the main tournament.

== Personal life ==
Alikaj is a practising Muslim. He has said: "I have fasting for many years and for me it is usual now, I do not feel any obstacle in my activity as a footballer.

== Honours ==
Dinamo Tirana

- Albanian Superliga: 2001–02

Skënderbeu Korçë

- Albanian Superliga: 2013–14, 2014–15
- Albanian Supercup: 2014
