= Vranidoll =

Vranidoll Vrani Do
- Village
- Location in Kosovo
- Country: Kosovo
- District: Pristina
- Municipality: Pristina

Population (2024)
  - Total: 991
- Time zone: UTC+1 (CET)
  - Summer (DST): UTC+2 (CEST)

Vranidoll (in Albanian; Serbian: Vrani Do, Врани До) is a village in the municipality of Pristina, in central Kosovo. It has about 1,000 inhabitants.

== History ==
It was settled by Albanians in the 18th century.

== Notable people ==
- Bajram Jashanica (born 1990), footballer
