= Erjon Llapanji =

Albanian footballer

Personal information
- Full name: Erjon Llapanji
- Date of birth: May 10, 1985 (age 41)
- Place of birth: Korçë, Albania
- Height: 1.86 m (6 ft 1 in)
- Position: Goalkeeper

Youth career
- 2002–2007: Skënderbeu

Senior career*
Years	Team	Apps	(Gls)
2007–2017	Skënderbeu	51	(0)
2009–2010	→ Bilisht Sport (loan)	7	(0)

International career^{‡}
2000–2002	Albania U-21	2	(0)
- * Club domestic league appearances and goals as of 14 May 2013 ‡ National team caps and goals as of 23 October 2010

Erjon Llapanji (born 10 May 1985) is an Albanian football retired goalkeeper who played for Skënderbeu Korçë in the Albanian Superliga.

== Honours ==
=== Clubs ===
Skënderbeu Korçë

- Albanian Superliga (5): 2010–11, 2011–12, 2012–13, 2013–14, 2014–15
- Albanian Cup Runner–up (1): 2011–12
- Albanian Supercup (2): 2013, 2014
