= Bakary Nimaga =

Malian footballer (born 1994)

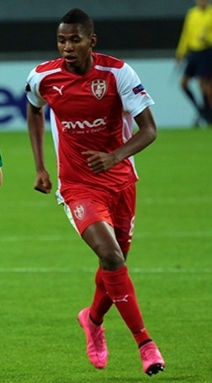

Personal information
- Full name: Bakary Nimaga
- Date of birth: 6 December 1994 (age 31)
- Place of birth: Douala, Cameroon
- Height: 1.89 m (6 ft 2 in)
- Position: Defensive midfielder

Youth career
- 2008–2012: Stade Malien
- 2012–2013: Twente

Senior career*
Years	Team	Apps	(Gls)
2013–2018	Skënderbeu Korçë	97	(5)
2018–2019	Hatayspor	11	(1)
2019–2021	TSV Hartberg	47	(3)
2021–2022	Zalaegerszeg	4	(0)
2022–2023	Rheindorf Altach	23	(2)
2023	Radnički Niš	1	(0)

International career
2012–2013	Mali U20	3	(0)
- * Club domestic league appearances and goals as of 27 December 2023

Bakary Nimaga (born 6 December 1994) is a Malian professional footballer who plays as a defensive midfielder.

== Club career ==
=== Early career ===
Nimaga was born in Douala, Cameroon to Malian parents who were working in Cameroon at the time of his birth, but they soon moved back to Mali during Bakary's childhood, where he grew up with his three brothers and four sisters. He helped his uncle at a local market in order to aid his family financially and to also fund his passion for football, as he was part of the Stade Malien academy. At the age of 15 he moved to South Africa to join a youth academy there with the help of a German couple who he had met in Mali, before moving to the Netherlands to join the FC Twente academy. He soon left the club and went on to live in Germany before returning to Mali.

=== Skënderbeu Korçë ===
Nimaga's agent was in contact with Albanian champions Skënderbeu Korçë prior to his move to the club, and was convinced by the club's official to return to Europe where he signed his first professional contract in the closing stages of the 2013 January transfer window, which was two-year deal ending on 31 December 2015. He featured in 5 league and 2 Albanian Cup games, helping his side win the Albanian Superliga championship for a third consecutive year.

On 17 August 2014, Nimaga scored the only goal in the 2014 Albanian Supercup against Flamurtari Vlorë at Qemal Stafa Stadium, giving the club their only second Supercup trophy. He scored in the beginning of the second half after a cross from the captain Bledi Shkëmbi.

Later, on 25 January of the following year, he scored the first league goal with the club, scoring the fourth during the 4–1 away win against Elbasani at Elbasan Arena, in the first match of the third phase. Nimaga played his 50th match on 2 May 2015, entering in the field in the last 15 minutes during the 4–2 home win against Teuta Durres. He ended his third season with 32 appearances and 5 goals in all competitions, with Skënderbeu Korçë by winning again the Albanian Superliga for a record fifth time, also reaching the semi-finals of Albanian Cup.

On 14 July 2015, in the first leg of second qualifying round of 2015–16 UEFA Champions League against Crusaders, Nimaga scored the opening goal in the 15th minute for a 4–1 victory. That was his first European goal in his six appearances in European competitions.

On 5 November 2015, Nimaga scored a fantastic goal from 40 yards in the 2015–16 UEFA Europa League group stage match against Sporting as teammate Peter Olayinka forced the Sporting goalkeeper Marcelo Boeck into a mistake and Nimaga himself capitalised on woeful defending to score from 40 yards as Skënderbeu recorded a 3–0 win against the Portuguese side at the Elbasan Arena, which was their first ever win at the group stage in any major tournament. During the 2015–16 season, Nimaga collected 30 appearances in all competitions, making only 15 league appearances, six of them as a starter, scoring three times in the process.

He started the 2016–17 season on 5 October by scoring four goals in the returning leg of 2016–17 Albanian Cup first round against Butrinti Sarandë, helping the team to win 8–0 and to progress to the next round with the aggregate 9–1. Later on 13th, Nimaga scored his first league goal, a 94th-minute winner against Teuta Durrës in the matchday 6 to help Skënderbeu maintain its 100% winning record.

=== Rheindorf Altach ===
On 28 January 2022, Nimaga returned to Austria and signed a one-and-a-half-year contract with Rheindorf Altach.

=== Radnički Niš ===
In September 2023, Nimaga joined Serbian club Radnički Niš along his compatriot Lassana Ndiaye.

== International career ==
He was named in the Mali U-20 squad for the 2013 FIFA U-20 World Cup held in Turkey, where he featured in all 3 group games, drawing two and losing one to finish bottom of Group D.

He can represent either Cameroon or Mali.

== Career statistics ==
As of 13 October 2023

Club	Season	League			Cup		Europe		Other		Total	
Club	Season	Division	Apps	Goals	Apps	Goals	Apps	Goals	Apps	Goals	Apps	Goals
Skënderbeu Korçë	2012–13	Kategoria Superiore	5	0	2	0	—		—		7	0
Skënderbeu Korçë	2013–14	Kategoria Superiore	8	0	3	2	4 (Note: Two appearances in UEFA Champions League, two appearances in UEFA Europa League)	0	0	0	15	2
Skënderbeu Korçë	2014–15	Kategoria Superiore	25	3	5	1	1 (Note: All Appearance(s) in UEFA Champions League)	0	1 (Note: Appearance in Albanian Supercup)	1	32	5
Skënderbeu Korçë	2015–16	Kategoria Superiore	15	0	5	1	10 (Note: Six appearances in UEFA Champions League, four appearances in UEFA Europa League)	2	0	0	30	3
Skënderbeu Korçë	2016–17	Kategoria Superiore	19	2	5	4	—		0	0	24	6
Skënderbeu Korçë	2017–18	Kategoria Superiore	25	0	6	1	10 (Note: All Appearance(s) in UEFA Europa League)	1	0	0	41	2
Skënderbeu Korçë	Total		97	5	26	9	25	3	1	1	149	18
Career total			97	5	26	9	25	3	1	1	149	18

== Honours ==
Skënderbeu Korçë

- Albanian Superliga: 2012–13, 2013–14, 2014–15, 2015–16
- Albanian Supercup: 2013, 2014
