= Gerhard Progni =

Albanian footballer

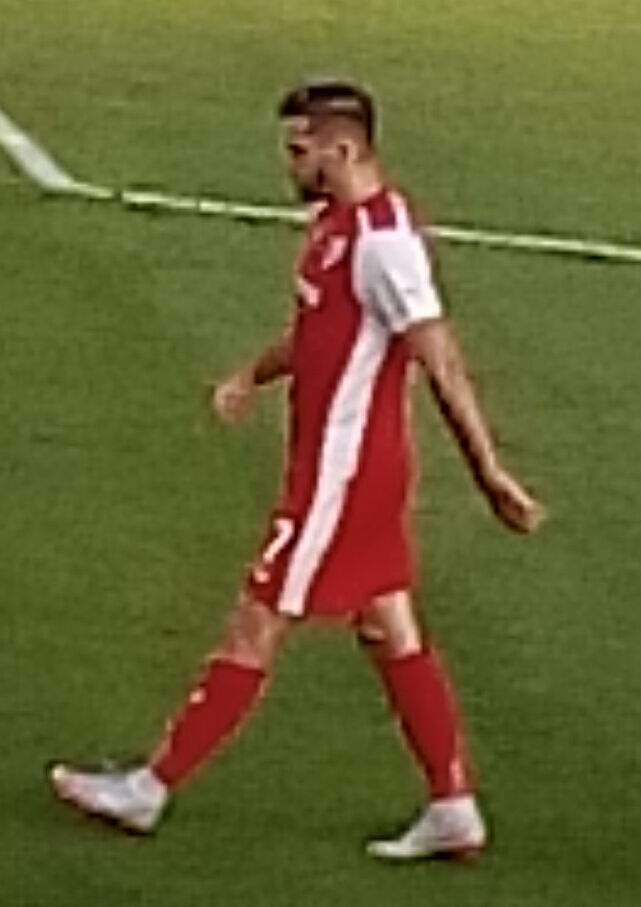

Personal information
- Full name: Gerhard Nik Progni
- Date of birth: 6 November 1986 (age 40)
- Place of birth: Bajram Curri, Albania
- Height: 1.85 m (6 ft 1 in)
- Position: Midfielder

Team information
- Current team: Valbona
- Number: 77

Youth career
- 2000–2005: Partizani Tirana

Senior career*
Years	Team	Apps	(Gls)
2004–2008	Partizani Tirana	40	(2)
2008–2009	Besa Kavajë	44	(5)
2009–2010	Dinamo Tirana	6	(0)
2010–2012	Flamurtari Vlorë	69	(14)
2012–2014	Kukësi	54	(10)
2014–2016	Skënderbeu Korçë	64	(10)
2016–2017	Zira	14	(2)
2017	Teuta Durrës	15	(2)
2017–2018	Partizani Tirana	34	(8)
2018–2019	Teuta Durrës	30	(7)
2019–2023	Gjilani	96	(44)
2023	Llapi	25	(4)
2023–	Valbona	7	(14)

International career
2005–2006	Albania U19	3	(0)
2007–2008	Albania U21	10	(2)
- * Club domestic league appearances and goals as of 21 April 2023

Gerhard Nik Progni (born 6 November 1986) is an Albanian professional footballer plays as a striker for Valbona.

A product of FK Partizani Tirana, Progni has played for several clubs in Albania, including Skënderbeu, whom he won one Albanian Superliga title.

== Club career ==
=== Early career ===
Progni began his career with Partizani as a child, where he played for the club's youth teams. During the 2004–05 season with Partizani's U-19 side, he won the national championship and caught the attention of the senior team, who invited him to train with them towards the end of the season. He was promoted from the U-19 side at the end of that season, and was loaned out to Albanian First Division side Kastrioti for the 2005–06 season in order to gain first team experience. During his year on loan, he became an integral part of the first team squad, and with his good performances and 3 league goals he even helped the club achieve promotion to the Albanian Superliga after a third-place finish.

=== FK Partizani Tirana ===
Following the successful loan period at Kastrioti, Progni returned to his parent club Partizani and signed a three-year contract with the club. During the 2006–07 campaign, he became an important first team player, making 29 league appearances and scoring 2 goals, helping his side finish 4th in the league as well as reaching the semi-finals of the Albanian Cup, where they narrowly lost to beaten finalists Teuta on away goals. The following season, he played for Partizani until January, making 11 league appearances, before leaving the club for Besa Kavajë.

=== KF Besa Kavajë ===
Porgni signed for Besa in January 2008, and immediately became an important member of the first team, making 16 league appearances and scoring 1 goal, helping the club finish third in the league (behind his previous team Partizani). He also scored a goal in the Albanian Cup with Besa, where the club reached the quarter-finals.

The following season Porgni remained in Kavajë, and made his European debut in the Intertoto Cup against Cypriot club Ethnikos Achna, where he was in the starting lineup for both legs, helping Besa to a 1–1 aggregate win on an away goal. In the next round his side faced Swiss outfit Grasshopper Club Zürich, who beat Besa 5–1 on aggregate, with Progni playing the full 90 minutes in both games. Domestically, Besa did not have a successful season, finishing 7th in the league, just 2 places above the relegation play-off spots. Progni did however have a successful individual season, scoring 4 league goals in 28 games, and scoring 3 goals in 6 cup games.

=== Dinamo Tirana ===
Progni left Besa Kavajë at the end of the 2008–09 season and joined Dinamo Tirana in the summer transfer window. At Dinamo he had a difficult time attempting to break into the first team, as the squad had an array of talent in the midfield positions, including Emiljano Vila and Elis Bakaj, meaning Progni's chances were limited. He left the club in January and made just 5 league appearances during his short time at Dinamo, all of which were substitute appearances. His only goal for the club came in the Albanian Cup against Adriatiku.

=== Flamurtari FC ===
After a less than fruitful short spell with Dinamo Tirana, Progni joined Flamurtari FC in January 2010 and immediately became an integral player, starting 16 league games in the second half of the season. In 2011, Progni rcontinued as a starter, scoring 6 goals in 30 league games, helping Flamurtari achieve a 2nd-place finish in the Albanian Superliga. At the end of the 2011 season, he went on trial with Romanian Liga I champions FC Oțelul Galați, accompanied by fellow Albanian and former ASC Oțelul Galați player, Arben Kokalari. His trial at the club was not successful, so he remained at Flamurtari for the following 2011–12 campaign. He featured in both Europa League games against Baumit Jablonec in the second qualifying round, which ended in a 7–1 aggregate loss for Flamurtari. In the league campaign, Progni played in 28 league games and scored 8 goals, helping Flamurtari finish 4th in the Albanian Superliga. In the cup, Progni featured in 12 games and scored 1 goal as Flamurtari reached the semi-finals, losing out to eventual winners Tirana.

=== FK Kukësi ===
Progni signed for newly promoted side FK Kukësi in the summer of 2012, who under the guidance of the club president Safet Gjici had an ambitious project to be one of the best clubs in the country.

In October 2013, the club captain Rrahman Hallaçi gave up his duties, making Progni the club's captain for the remainder of the season.

=== KF Skënderbeu Korce ===
On 10 June 2014, reigning Albanian champions for the past four seasons KF Skënderbeu Korce announced the signing of Progni from FK Kukësi on a one-year contract. He was considered to be the replacement of Gjergji Muzaka, who had left the club in favour of a return to one of Progni's former sides, Flamurtari.

On 5 August 2015, in the returning match of the Third qualifying round of 2015–16 UEFA Champions League against Milsami Orhei, Progni scored the second goal of the match in the 55th minute to help the team to win the match at Elbasan Arena 2–0 and to qualify in Play-off round with the aggregate 4–0.

=== Zira FK ===
On 23 June 2016, Progni moved abroad for the first time by signing a two-year contract with Zira FK of Azerbaijan Premier League. Six months later, Progni left Zira by mutual consent on 9 January 2017.

=== KF Teuta Durrës ===
On 23 January 2017, Progni returned to Albanian Superliga by signing a six-month contract with Teuta, taking the squad number 77. In an interview two days later, he said he returned to Albania to stay closer to his family. He made his debut on 29 January against Tirana at home, contributing in a 1–0 win in the team's first competitive match of 2017.

During the second part of 2016–17 season, Progni contributed with 15 league matches, scoring 2 times, including the winner against Vllaznia in the penultimate matchday which assured Teuta another season in the top flight. He also played 4 matches and scored once in team's unsuccessful run in the Albanian Cup, which ended at the hands of Skënderbeu. Following the end of the season, Progni's contract expired and he became a free agent.

=== Return to Partizani ===
On 14 June 2017, Progni completed a transfer to Partizani, returning to his first club after nine years. He was presented the same day where he penned a two-year contract with an option of a further one and was allocated squad number 77, the same he held during his last season with Teuta.

Progni started the domestic season on 10 September by playing full-90 minutes in the opening championship match versus Laçi, ended in a 0–2 loss. Progni was given a new role under Italian manager Mark Iuliano, playing as a right-back in the 4–3–3 lineup. Progni's first score-sheet contributions came later on 20 November by netting the second of the 2–1 win at Kukësi.

In January 2018, Progni switched his kit number from 77 to his preferred 7, last worn by the departed Realdo Fili. He wore the number 7 for the first time on 31 January, in the cup match against former club Flamurtari. Progni finished the 2017–18 season as Partizani's top scorer with 9 goals, including 8 in league, his highest tally since the 2011–12 season.

In July 2018, he played in both matches of 2018–19 UEFA Europa League first qualifying round against NK Maribor, unable to avoid the elimination. Progni left the club in a surprise move on 30 August, after having collected 43 matches and scoring 9 goals in all competitions. Partizani Tirana terminated the player's contract by mutual consent due to being more focused on youngster players, while Progni's place in the starting lineup was not secure after collecting only 86 minutes in the first two league matches. Manager Skënder Gega, speaking on Progni's departure, stated that the player was in his plans, but he [Progni] left with the aim of a new challenge.

=== Return to Teuta ===
On 31 August 2018, Progni was presented as Teuta s' newest player, signing a contract until the end of the season and taking squad number 11.

=== SC Gjilani ===
On 26 July 2019, Progni joined SC Gjilani.

== International career ==
Progni has presented Albania at youth level, making 3 appearances for under-19 side and 10 for under-21.

== Career statistics ==
=== Club ===
As of 2 September 2018

Club statistics
Club	Season	League			Cup		Europe		Other		Total	
Club	Season	Division	Apps	Goals	Apps	Goals	Apps	Goals	Apps	Goals	Apps	Goals
Partizani	2003–04	Albanian Superliga	?	?	?	?	—		—		?	?
Partizani	2004–05	Albanian Superliga	?	?	?	?	—		—		?	?
Partizani	2006–07	Albanian Superliga	29	2	?	?	—		—		29	2
Partizani	2007–08	Albanian Superliga	11	0	?	?	—		—		11	0
Partizani	Total		40	2	?	?	—		—		40	2
Besa	2007–08	Albanian Superliga	16	1	?	?	—		—		16	1
Besa	2008–09	Albanian Superliga	28	4	6	3	4 (Note: All appearance(s) in UEFA Intertoto Cup)	0	—		38	7
Besa	Total		44	5	6	3	4	0	—		64	8
Dinamo Tirana	2009–10	Albanian Superliga	6	0	3	1	—		—		9	1
Flamurtari	2009–10	Albanian Superliga	14	0	0	0	—		—		14	0
Flamurtari	2010–11	Albanian Superliga	30	6	2	0	—		—		32	6
Flamurtari	2011–12	Albanian Superliga	25	8	12	1	2 (Note: All appearance(s) in UEFA Europa League)	0	—		39	9
Flamurtari	2012–13	Albanian Superliga	—		—		1	0	—		1	0
Flamurtari	Total		69	14	14	1	3	0	—		86	15
Kukësi	2012–13	Albanian Superliga	25	6	9	2	—		—		34	8
Kukësi	2013–14	Albanian Superliga	29	4	9	2	8	1	—		46	7
Kukësi	Total		54	10	18	4	8	1	—		80	15
Skënderbeu	2014–15	Albanian Superliga	31	5	5	2	2 (Note: All appearance(s) in UEFA Champions League)	0	1 (Note: Appearance in Albanian Supercup)	0	39	7
Skënderbeu	2015–16	Albanian Superliga	33	5	8	2	11 (Note: Six appearances in UEFA Champions League, five in UEFA Europa League)	1	1	0	53	8
Skënderbeu	Total		64	10	13	4	13	1	2	0	92	15
Zira	2016–17	Azerbaijan Premier League	14	2	3	0	—		—		17	2
Teuta	2016–17	Albanian Superliga	15	2	4	1	—		—		19	3
Partizani	2017–18	Albanian Superliga	32	8	5	1	2	0	—		39	9
Partizani	2018–19	Albanian Superliga	2	0	0	0	2	0	—		4	0
Partizani	Total		34	8	5	1	4	0	—		43	9
Teuta	2018–19	Albanian Superliga	1	0	0	0	—		—		1	0
Career total			341	53	66	14	32	2	2	0	441	69

== Honours ==
Skënderbeu Korçë

- Albanian Superliga: 2014–15
- Albanian Supercup: 2014
