= Da Silva Buiu =

Brazilian footballer (born 1986)

Personal information
- Full name: Luiz Fernando de Almeida da Silva
- Date of birth: 14 January 1986 (age 40)
- Place of birth: Campo Grande, Brazil
- Height: 1.72 m (5 ft 8 in)
- Position: Left back

Senior career*
Years	Team	Apps	(Gls)
2008–2009	Poções	15	(1)
2009–2011	Sampaio Corrêa		
2011–2012	Apolonia Fier	13	(0)
2012–2014	Teuta Durrës	50	(0)
- * Club domestic league appearances and goals

Luiz Fernando de Almeida da Silva (born 14 January 1986), known as Da Silva Buiu, is a Brazilian former footballer who played as a left back.
