= Besnik Prenga =

Albanian footballer, coach, & manager (born 1969)

Personal information
- Date of birth: 5 June 1969 (age 57)
- Place of birth: Mirditë, Albania
- Position: Midfielder

Senior career*
Years	Team	Apps	(Gls)
1990–1991	Kastrioti	17	(4)
1991–1992	Partizani	23	(9)
1992–1993	Dubrava		
1993	Istra Pula	2	(0)
1994	Dubrava	12	(3)
1994–1995	Zadar	14	(3)
1995–1997	Mladost Suhopolje	23	(8)
1997–1998	Dinamo Zagreb	0	(0)
1998–1999	Maccabi Petah Tikva	2	(1)
2000–2001	Čakovec	10	(2)

International career
1992–1994	Albania	2	(0)

Managerial career
- 200x–2015: Hrvatski Dragovoljac U-19
- 2015: Hrvatski Dragovoljac
- 2016–2017: Lokomotiva U-19
- 2017–2018: Lučko
- 2018−2019: Laçi
- * Club domestic league appearances and goals

Besnik Prenga (born 5 June 1969) is an Albanian retired football player and current coach who most recently managed Laçi in the Albanian Superliga.

== Club career ==
Prenga played the majority of his career in Croatia. He was at Dinamo Zagreb between 1997 and 1998 but featured in only one Champions League game.

== International career ==
Prenga has been an Albania international for two years, making two appearances between 1992 and 1994.

== Managerial career ==
Prenga begun his managerial career with the under-19 side of NK Hrvatski Dragovoljac. In the 2016–17 season, he led NK Lokomotiva U19 to their first championship after a goalless draw versus Dinamo Zagreb U19 in May 2017.

=== NK Lučko ===
On 12 June 2017, after two years without a senior club, Prenga joined Lučko for the 2017–18 season. His spell wasn't successful, as he was in charge for only four matches before being sacked in September.

=== Laçi ===
On 6 June 2018, Prenga signed a one-year contract with Laçi of Albanian Superliga. His first game in charge was the first leg of 2018–19 UEFA Europa League first qualifying round against Anorthosis Famagusta. The team lost 2–1 at Antonis Papadopoulos Stadium despite scoring first. In the second leg, Prenga won his first match as Laçi manager thanks to a late winner of Myrto Uzuni for a 1–0 win, which was enough to clinch the qualification by the away-goal rule.

== Personal life ==
His son Herdi is also a professional footballer at Inter Zaprešić. His niece Arjola is a professional volleyball player in Norway.

== Career statistics ==
=== Managerial ===
Team	From	To	Record					Ref
Team	From	To	M	W	D	L	Win %	Ref
Hrvatski Dragovoljac	3 May 2015	30 June 2015	3	1	1	1	33.3	
NK Lučko	12 June 2017	4 September 2017	4	1	1	2	25.0	
Laçi	6 June 2018	15 March 2019	3	1	0	2	33.3	
Total			10	3	2	5	30.0	
