= Marconi (footballer) =

Brazilian footballer (born 1988)

Personal information
- Full name: Marconi Ribeiro Souza
- Date of birth: 22 June 1988 (age 38)
- Place of birth: Teixeira de Freitas, Brazil
- Height: 1.75 m (5 ft 9 in)
- Position: Defensive midfielder

Team information
- Current team: Floresta

Youth career
- 2000–2008: Vitória

Senior career*
Years	Team	Apps	(Gls)
2008–2011	Vitória		
2009	→ Ipitanga (loan)	11	(1)
2009	→ Galícia (loan)		
2011	Boa Esporte	5	(0)
2012	Americano	10	(0)
2013	Anápolis	1	(0)
2013	Botafogo	1	(0)
2014	Serrano	16	(1)
2014	Skënderbeu Korçë	0	(0)
2015	Colo Colo	12	(0)
2015	Bahia de Feira	8	(0)
2016	Águia de Marabá	4	(0)
2017	Jacobina EC	2	(0)
2018	Altos	16	(0)
2019–	Floresta	0	(0)
- * Club domestic league appearances and goals as of 31 January 2019

Marconi Ribeiro Souza (born 22 June 1988) is a Brazilian footballer who currently plays for Floresta. His older brother Ademir is a footballer who also plays for Skënderbeu Korçë.
