= Artnant Tahirllari =

Albanian footballer

Personal information
- Full name: Artnant Tahirllari
- Date of birth: 12 February 1992 (age 34)
- Place of birth: Korçë, Albania
- Position: Striker

Team information
- Current team: Kastoria

Youth career
- –2011: Skënderbeu

Senior career*
Years	Team	Apps	(Gls)
2011–2015	Skënderbeu	21	(4)
2014	→ Elbasani (loan)	10	(0)
2015	→ Luftëtari (loan)	8	(0)
2015–2016	Adriatiku	18	(2)
2016–	Kastoria		
- * Club domestic league appearances and goals

Artnant Tahirllari (born 12 February 1992 in Korçë) is an Albanian footballer who plays as a striker for Greek lower league side Kastoria.

== Club career ==
In January 2015, Tahirllari joined Luftëtari Gjirokastër on loan from Skënderbeu Korçë.

=== Career statistics ===
Club performance			League		Cup		Continental		Total	
Season	Club	League	Apps	Goals	Apps	Goals	Apps	Goals	Apps	Goals
Albania			League		Albanian Cup		Europe		Total	
2011–12	Skënderbeu Korçë	Albanian Superliga	8	4	6	1	0	0	14	5
2012–13	Skënderbeu Korçë	Albanian Superliga	4	0	7	3	0	0	11	3
2013–14	Skënderbeu Korçë	Albanian Superliga	9	0	7	6	0	0	16	6
Total			21	4	20	10	0	0	41	14
2014–15	KF Elbasani (loan)	Albanian Superliga	10	0	4	0	–		14	0
2014–15	Luftëtari Gjirokastër (loan)	Albanian First Division	8	0	–		–		8	0
Career total			39	4	24	10	0	0	63	14
