= Leonit Abazi =

Kosovar professional footballer (born 1993)

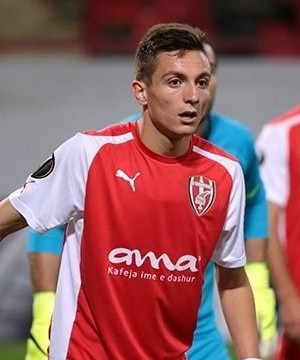
- Abazi with Skënderbeu in October 2015

Personal information
- Date of birth: 5 July 1993 (age 33)
- Place of birth: Gjilan, FR Yugoslavia (modern Kosovo)
- Height: 1.74 m (5 ft 9 in)
- Position: Left back

Team information
- Current team: Gjilani
- Number: 32

Youth career
- 2006–2011: Drita

Senior career*
Years	Team	Apps	(Gls)
2011–2013	Drita		
2013–2019	Skënderbeu	89	(3)
2019–2022	Prishtina	75	(9)
2022–2023	Ballkani	2	(0)
2026–	Gjilani	2	(0)

International career^{‡}
2013–2014	Albania U21	2	(0)
2015–	Kosovo	1	(0)
- * Club domestic league appearances and goals as of 22 June 2026 ‡ National team caps and goals as of 4 December 2015

Leonit Abazi (born 5 July 1993) is a Kosovar professional footballer who plays as a left back for Gjilani.

== Club career ==
=== Skënderbeu Korçë ===
Born in Gjilan, in modern-day Kosovo, with a family originally from the village of Perlepnica in Gjilan. Abazi played with Drita in the Football Superleague of Kosovo before moving to Albania to join the reigning defending champions Skënderbeu Korçë in the summer of 2013. He made his debut for Sëenderbeu in their victory on penalty shootouts against Laçi in the 2013 Albanian Supercup.

Abazi made his first Albanian Superliga appearance on 15 September 2013 in second matchday against Flamurtari Vlorë, playing the second half as the team was defeated 1–2 away. Later on 3 October, he was replaced after only 17 minutes in the match against Vllaznia Shkodër. Some days after, it was reported that Abazi has plucked his left knee ligaments and will be sidelined for the next 6 months. He finished his first season in Albania by making 12 appearances in all competitions.

Abazi playing his first competitive match after 10 months on 17 August 2014 in the 2014 Albanian Supercup against Flamurtari Vlorë which was won 1–0 at Qemal Stafa Stadium. He scored his maiden Skënderbeu goal on 1 October in the first leg of 2014–15 Albanian Cup first round in the 1–10 thrashing of Himara. Abazi opened his Albanian Superliga account on 23 February of the following year against championship rivals Kukësi. He dedicated the goal to his mother. He concluded 2014–15 season 32 appearances in all competitions, including 23 in league as Skënderbeu retained the championship for the fourth time in a row.

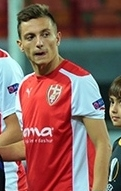
Abazi lining up with Skënderbeu Korçë.

Following the end of the season, Abazi signed a new deal with the club along with teammate Bajram Jashanica. The new contract would run until 30 June 2017 and had the option to renew for another year. In the summer of 2015, Abazi made two appearances as substitute as Skenderbeu become first Albanian club to reach Champions League play-off. Skënderbeu was eventually eliminated by Dinamo Zagreb in the play-off which meant Skënderbeu had qualified to 2015–16 UEFA Europa League group stage for the first time in history.

Abazi scored his first league goal for 2015–16 season in a 4–0 thrashing of Bylis Ballsh on 3 December 2015. He collected 451 minutes in the UEFA Europa League group stage as Skënderbeu finished Group H in last place with 3 points. He finished his third Skënderbeu Korçë season by making 40 appearances in all competitions, as Skënderbeu won their seventh Albanian Superliga title, which was later revoked due to match fixing.

Abazi's 2016–17 season was marred by injuries. He managed to make only 7 appearances in all competitions. He was recovered in June 2017, but was reinjured again.

After more than a year sidelined due to injury, Abazi returned on training in February 2018. He made his first appearance of the season on 14 March by appearing as a substitute in the second half of a 1–1 away draw against Teuta Durrës. By playing in the 3–1 away loss to Luftëtari Gjirokastër on 19 May, Abazi reached the 100 appearances milestone for the club. He finished the league by making 8 appearances, 4 of them as starter, collecting 372 minutes as the team won the championship once again. In cup, he had little to offer, but still played two matches as substitute, both semi-final legs against Flamurtari Vlorë, as the tournament ended in conquest, meaning that the team had achieved the domestic double for the first time in history.

Abazi was fully recovered ahead of the 2018–19 season. He began his sixth season with the club on 12 August, playing full-90 minutes in a 3–2 success against Laçi in the 2018 Albanian Supercup match.

== International career ==
=== Albania ===
Abazi has been part of Albania under-21 squad, collecting 2 appearances.

=== Kosovo ===
Abazi received his first call-up to the Kosovo senior team by manager Albert Bunjaki for the friendly match against Equatorial Guinea. He was able to earn his first international cap by appearing in the last six minutes in place of Ilir Berisha as the match was won 2–0 at Pristina City Stadium.

== Career statistics ==
=== Club ===
As of 18 August 2018

Club statistics
Club	Season	League			Cup		Europe		Other		Total	
Club	Season	Division	Apps	Goals	Apps	Goals	Apps	Goals	Apps	Goals	Apps	Goals
Skënderbeu Korçë	2013–14	Albanian Superliga	5	0	0	0	6 (Note: Four appearances in UEFA Champions League, two in UEFA Europa League)	0	1 (Note: Appearance in Albanian Supercup)	0	12	0
Skënderbeu Korçë	2014–15	Albanian Superliga	23	1	8	2	0	0	1	0	32	3
Skënderbeu Korçë	2015–16	Albanian Superliga	25	2	6	1	8 (Note: Two appearances in UEFA Champions League, six in UEFA Europa League)	0	1	0	40	3
Skënderbeu Korçë	2016–17	Albanian Superliga	2	0	4	0	—		1	0	7	0
Skënderbeu Korçë	2017–18	Albanian Superliga	8	0	2	0	0	0	—		10	0
Skënderbeu Korçë	2018–19	Albanian Superliga	1	0	0	0	—		1	0	2	0
Skënderbeu Korçë	Total		64	3	20	3	14	0	5	0	103	6
Career total			64	3	20	3	14	0	5	0	103	6

=== International ===
As of 25 October 2015

Appearances and goals by national team and year
National team	Year	Apps	Goals
Kosovo	2015	1	0
Total		1	0

== Honours ==
Skënderbeu Korçë

- Albanian Superliga: 2013–14, 2014–15, 2015–16, 2017–18
- Albanian Cup: 2017–18
- Albanian Supercup: 2013, 2014, 2018
