= Bledi Shkëmbi =

Albanian footballer and coach

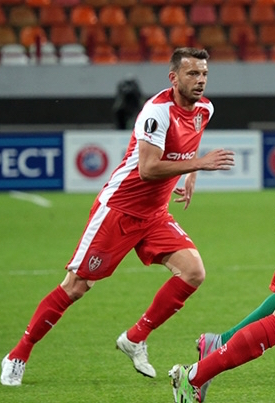

Personal information
- Full name: Bledi Shkëmbi
- Date of birth: 13 August 1979 (age 47)
- Place of birth: Korçë, Albania
- Height: 1.84 m (6 ft 0 in)
- Position: Attacking midfielder

Team information
- Current team: Struga (manager)

Youth career
- 1990–1997: Skënderbeu

Senior career*
Years	Team	Apps	(Gls)
1997–2000	Skënderbeu	80	(4)
2000–2001	Teuta	21	(1)
2001	Ethnikos Asteras	1	(0)
2002–2004	Rijeka	50	(2)
2004	Kamen Ingrad	14	(2)
2005–2006	Metalurh Zaporizhzhia	22	(0)
2006	Kryvbas Kryvyi Rih	5	(0)
2007	Teuta	13	(0)
2007–2008	Partizani	25	(3)
2008–2009	Skënderbeu	28	(5)
2010	Besa	14	(2)
2010–2016	Skënderbeu	153	(27)
Total		426	(46)

International career^{‡}
2001–2006	Albania	14	(0)

Managerial career
- 2017–2018: Liria
- 2018–2019: Teuta
- 2020–2021: Ballkani
- 2021–2022: Dinamo Tirana
- 2022: Teuta
- 2023: Voska Sport
- 2024: Albania U-19
- 2024: Albania U-17
- 2024: Tirana
- 2025: Tirana
- 2025–: Struga
- * Club domestic league appearances and goals as of 20 May 2016 ‡ National team caps and goals as of 16 August 2006

Bledi Shkëmbi (born 13 August 1979) is an Albanian professional football coach and former player. who is the current head coach of Tirana in the Kategoria Superiore.

A former Albanian international, he has previously played for Ethnikos Asteras in Greece, Rijeka and Kamen Ingrad in Croatia, Metalurh Zaporizhzhia and Kryvbas in Ukraine as well as Teuta Durrës, Partizani Tirana and Besa Kavajë in Albania.

== Club career ==
=== Early career ===
Shkëmbi joined his local side Skënderbeu Korçë as an 11-year-old and progressed through the youth ranks before eventually being promoted to the senior side ahead of the 1997–98 season. He immediately became a first team player as an 18-year-old, featuring in 31 league games out of a possible 34, and scoring one goal in the process to help his side finish 11th in the league out of 18 teams. The following season was similar for Shkëmbi as he was an important player in the club's midfield as they finished just 2 points above the relegation zone as he played 24 league games and scored twice. He then made 25 appearances out of a possible 26 in the league during the 1999–00 season and scored once in a 7–0 thrashing of Apolonia Fier. He was then allowed to search for a new club and leave on a free transfer.

He joined Teuta Durrës ahead of the 2000–01 season, and his first game for the club was the 2000 Albanian Supercup against KF Tirana, playing the full 90 minutes in the 1–0 loss. In the league he made 21 appearances and scored once, against Tomori Berat, as his side finished 6th with his former side Skënderbeu Korçë finishing bottom and being relegated to the Albanian First Division. He was part of the Teuta Durrës side that reached the final of the Albanian Cup during the 2000–01 season, as he scored against Naftëtari Kuçovë in the first round, before starting the final against KF Tirana who beat Teuta Durrës as they had done before the season started in the Albanian Supercup, this time 5–0. He made his European debut with Teuta Durrës on 10 August 2001 in a UEFA Cup second qualifying round game against Rapid Vienna, starting in the 2–0 loss as he was substituted in the 82nd minute for Erion Matraku. He also started the return leg but his side lost 4–0. He then left the club following their short lived UEFA Cup run, as his contract ran out.

=== Besa Kavajë ===
In January 2010, Shkembi signed with Besa Kavajë on an 18 months contract with an option to renew for another year after the expiration of it. During the second part of 2009–10 season, he played 12 matches, scoring twice in the process. He left the club after the end of the season, he and Alban Dragusha were excluded by the coach Shpëtim Duro ahead of the European clash against Olympiacos.

=== Skënderbeu Korçë ===
In July 2010, he and Alban Dragusha were signed by Skënderbeu Korçë. His return was strongly required by the club's fans.

At the end of 2011–12 season, in which Shkëmbi contributed with 36 appearances and 10 goals in all competitions, he was presented Fair Play Award.

On 19 August 2015, in the first leg of play-off round of 2015–16 UEFA Champions League against Dinamo Zagreb at Elbasan Arena, Shkëmbi scored the opener in the 37th minute with a free kick, but it was not enough as Dinamo Zagreb reacted and won the match 2–1.

On 18 May, Shkëmbi officially retired from professional football at the age of 36, ending his nineteen-year career by lifting the club's six consecutive league title.

== International career ==
He has been a former international player of Albania from 2001 to 2006, during which he collected 14 matches without scoring a goal. He was called by the coach of that time Sulejman Demollari to participate at Tournament Bahrain where he made 3 appearances, all of them as a substitute.

== Managerial career ==
=== Liria ===
On 16 June 2017, Shkëmbi begun his managerial career as he was appointed manager of Football Superleague of Kosovo outfit Liria. He signed a contract for the 2017–18 season. Later on 2 March 2018, he handed a resignation request due to presidency change in the club. Following the 1–0 win over Feronikeli that day, Shkëmbi stated that the club is in financial crisis and the presidency seek to put hands on the lineup. Shkëmbi eventually resigned on 19 May after guiding the team to a 5th-place finish.

=== Teuta ===
On 3 June 2018, Shkëmbi was announced as the new manager of Teuta Durrës for the 2018–19 season.

=== Tirana ===
On 5 June 2024, Tirana announced to have signed Shkëmbi as their new coach for the upcoming 2024–25 season, replacing Erbim Fagu in the process.

== Career statistics ==
=== Club ===
As of 20 May 2016

Appearances and goals by club, season and competition
Club	Season	League			Cup		Europe		Other		Total	
Club	Season	Division	Apps	Goals	Apps	Goals	Apps	Goals	Apps	Goals	Apps	Goals
Teuta Durrës	2006–07	Albanian Superliga	13	0	0	0	—		—		13	0
Partizani Tirana	2007–08	Albanian Superliga	25	3	0	0	—		—		25	3
Skënderbeu Korçë	2008–09	Albanian First Division	13	3	0	0	—		—		13	3
Skënderbeu Korçë	2009–10	Albanian Superliga	15	2	0	0	—		—		15	2
Skënderbeu Korçë	Total		28	5	0	0	—		—		28	5
Besa Kavajë	2009–10	Albanian Superliga	14	2	0	0	—		—		14	2
Skënderbeu Korçë]	2010–11	Albanian Superliga	30	8	1	0	—		—		31	8
Skënderbeu Korçë]	2011–12	Albanian Superliga	22	7	11	3	2 (Note: Appearance(s) in UEFA Champions League)	0	1 (Note: Appearance in Albanian Supercup)	0	36	10
Skënderbeu Korçë]	2012–13	Albanian Superliga	20	1	7	2	0	0	0	0	27	3
Skënderbeu Korçë]	2013–14	Albanian Superliga	28	7	4	0	5 (Note: Four appearances and two goals in UEFA Champions League, one in UEFA Europa League)	2	0	0	37	9
Skënderbeu Korçë]	2014–15	Albanian Superliga	31	4	6	3	2	0	1	0	40	7
Skënderbeu Korçë]	2015–16	Albanian Superliga	22	0	3	0	10 (Note: Six appearances and one goal in UEFA Champions League, four in UEFA Europa League)	1	1	0	36	1
Skënderbeu Korçë]	Total		153	27	32	8	19	3	3	0	207	38
Career total			233	37	32	8	19	3	3	0	287	46

=== International ===
Appearances and goals by national team and year
National team	Year	Apps	Goals
Albania	2002	3	0
Albania	2003	5	0
Albania	2004	2	0
Albania	2005	3	0
Albania	2006	1	0
Total		14	0

== Honours ==
Besa Kavajë

- Albanian Cup: 2009–10

Skënderbeu Korçë

- Albanian Superliga: 2010–11, 2011–12, 2012–13, 2013–14, 2014–15, 2015–16
- Albanian Supercup: 2013, 2014

Individual

- Albanian Superliga Fair Play Award: 2011–12
- Albanian Superliga Player of the Month: December 2013
