= Skënderbeu Stadium =

Multi-purpose stadium in Korçë, Albania

- Stadiumi Skënderbeu
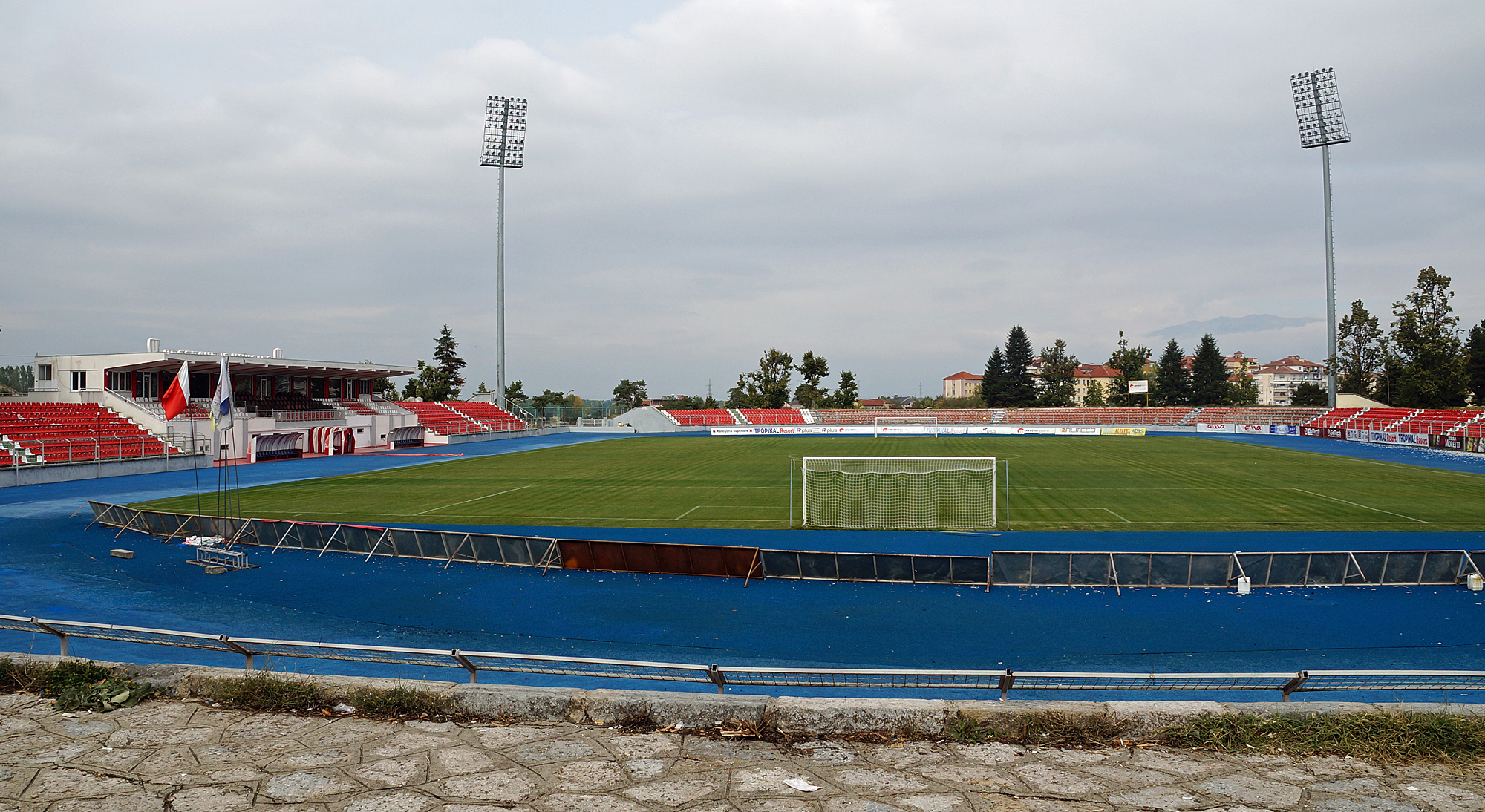
- UEFA
- Interactive map of Skënderbeu Stadium
- Location: Rruga Kristaq Papargjiri 1, 7001 Korçë, Albania
- Coordinates: 40°37′33″N 20°46′58″E
- Owner: Municipality of Korça
- Operator: Skënderbeu
- Capacity: 5,800
- Surface: Grass
- Scoreboard: Yes
- Field size: 105 m × 68 m (344 ft × 223 ft)

Construction
- Built: 1957
- Opened: 1957
- Renovated: 2011

Tenant
- Skënderbeu (1957-present)

Skënderbeu Stadium (Albanian: Stadiumi Skënderbeu) is a multi-purpose stadium in Korçë, Albania. The ground is currently the home of KF Skënderbeu Korçë. It had capacity of 12,343, but after installing individual seats its number decreased to 5,800 seats.

== History ==
The stadium is the current grounds for Skënderbeu as well as other municipal and national athletic events. It was first opened in 1957, and then later fully renovated in 2010, thanks to major contributions by various corporate donors. The stadium was approved by UEFA, to hold preliminary rounds of Champions League matches in 2011. In September 2023, Danish architectural office CEBRA was awarded the contract to fully renovate the stadium and surrounding area.
