= 2012–13 Kategoria Superiore =

Kategoria Superiore
- Season: 2012–13
- Dates: 25 August 2012 – 11 May 2013
- Champions: Skënderbeu; 4th Albanian title
- Relegated: Shkumbini; Tomori; Luftëtari; Apolonia
- Champions League: Skënderbeu
- Europa League: Kukësi; Teuta; Laçi
- Matches: 182
- Goals: 433 (2.38 per match)
- Top goalscorer: Migen Memelli (19 goals)
- Biggest home win: Kukësi 6–1 Flamurtari (27 April 2013)
- Biggest away win: Apolonia 0–3 Luftëtari (29 September 2012); Shkumbini 0–3 Flamurtari (2 March 2013); Tirana 3–6 Flamurtari (16 March 2013); Tomori 2–5 Kukësi (17 March 2013); Kastrioti 0–3 Tirana (31 March 2013); Luftëtari 0–3 Laçi (12 April 2013); Kastrioti 0–3 Kukësi (4 May 2013)
- Highest scoring: Tirana 3–6 Flamurtari (16 March 2013)

The 2012–13 Kategoria Superiore was the 74th official season, or 77th season of top-tier football in Albania (including three unofficial championships of the World War II) and the fifteenth season under the name Kategoria superiore. The season began on 25 August 2012 and ended on 11 May 2013. Skënderbeu Korçë were the defending champions retained their title, winning their fourth Albanian league championship.

== Promotion and relegation ==
Pogradeci and Dinamo Tirana were directly relegated to the Kategoria e Parë after finishing 13th and 14th in the previous year's standings. They are replaced by Kategoria e Parë champions Luftëtari Gjirokastër and runners-up Kukësi.

The 10th placed Tomori Berat, 11th placed Kamza and 12th placed Apolonia Fier had to compete in single-match relegation play-offs. Kamza were relegated after were lost 2–0 against Kategoria e Parë fourth-placed club Besa Kavajë, while Tomori and Apolonia Fier were retained their place in the league. Tomori won the match against Kategoria e Parë fifth-placed club Besëlidhja Lezhë after a penalty shoot-out and Apolonia Fier were defeated a Kategoria e Parë third-placed club Lushnja 3–0.

== Teams ==
=== Stadia and last season ===
Locations of the 2012–13 Kategoria Superiore teams

Team	Location	Stadium	Capacity	Last season
Apolonia	Fier	Loni Papuçiu Stadium	6,800	12th
Besa	Kavajë	Besa Stadium	9,000	Kategoria e Parë
Bylis	Ballsh	Adush Muça Stadium	5,200	6th
Flamurtari	Vlorë	Flamurtari Stadium	9,500	4th
Kastrioti	Krujë	Kastrioti Stadium	10,000	5th
Kukësi	Kukës	Zeqir Ymeri Stadium	10,000	Kategoria e Parë
Laçi	Laç	Laçi Stadium	11,000	8th
Luftëtari	Gjirokastër	Subi Bakiri Stadium	8,500	Kategoria e Parë
Skënderbeu	Korçë	Skënderbeu Stadium	12,000	Champions
Shkumbini	Peqin	Shkumbini Stadium	5,000	9th
Teuta	Durrës	Niko Dovana Stadium	13,000	2nd
Tirana	Tirana	Selman Stërmasi Stadium	12,500	3rd
Tomori	Berat	Tomori Stadium	14,450	10th
Vllaznia	Shkodër	Loro Boriçi Stadium	16,000	7th

== League table ==
Pos	Team	Pld	W	D	L	GF	GA	GD	Pts	Qualification or relegation
1	Skënderbeu (C)	26	18	4	4	43	14	+29	58	Qualification for the Champions League second qualifying round
2	Kukësi	26	15	7	4	49	25	+24	52	Qualification for the Europa League first qualifying round
3	Teuta	26	14	6	6	32	24	+8	48	Qualification for the Europa League first qualifying round
4	Flamurtari	26	13	7	6	49	33	+16	46	
5	Tirana	26	12	7	7	30	23	+7	43	
6	Vllaznia	26	11	5	10	30	26	+4	38	
7	Laçi	26	11	5	10	32	31	+1	38	Qualification for the Europa League first qualifying round (Note: Laçi qualified for the Europa League first qualifying round by winning the 2012–13 Albanian Cup.)
8	Kastrioti	26	10	4	12	25	35	−10	34	
9	Bylis	26	9	6	11	32	29	+3	33	
10	Besa	26	8	8	10	23	26	−3	32	
11	Shkumbini (R)	26	7	8	11	18	33	−15	29	Relegation to the 2013–14 Kategoria e Parë
12	Tomori (R)	26	4	7	15	30	50	−20	19	Relegation to the 2013–14 Kategoria e Parë
13	Luftëtari (R)	26	5	4	17	24	44	−20	19	Relegation to the 2013–14 Kategoria e Parë
14	Apolonia (R)	26	1	10	15	16	40	−24	13	Relegation to the 2013–14 Kategoria e Parë

Source: Albanian Football Association (in Albanian), Soccerway
Rules for classification: 1) points; 2) points in head-to-head matches; 3) goal difference in head-to-head matches; 4) goals scored in head-to-head matches; 5) total goal difference; 6) total goals scored; 7) draw
(C) Champions; (R) Relegated

== Results ==
Home \ Away	APO	BES	BYL	FLA	KAS	KUK	LAÇ	LUF	SKË	SKU	TEU	TIR	TOM	VLL
Apolonia		2–1	0–1	0–0	1–1	0–0	1–1	0–3	0–1	1–1	1–2	0–0	2–2	1–3
Besa	1–1		1–3	1–0	2–0	0–2	1–2	2–0	1–1	1–1	1–0	2–1	3–0	0–0
Bylis	3–0	1–1		1–1	0–0	3–0	4–0	2–0	1–1	2–0	1–2	1–0	4–1	0–1
Flamurtari	3–1	0–0	3–0		3–0	2–0	0–1	3–0	1–0	1–1	1–1	1–1	5–2	3–1
Kastrioti	4–1	2–0	2–1	3–0		0–3	2–1	1–0	1–2	1–0	0–1	0–3	1–0	3–2
Kukësi	1–0	3–0	1–0	6–1	3–1		2–1	0–0	4–3	5–1	1–1	2–1	3–1	0–0
Laçi	1–0	1–1	3–1	1–2	3–0	1–1		3–0	0–2	1–0	1–0	0–0	4–3	2–1
Luftëtari	3–2	0–2	1–1	2–3	2–0	1–3	0–3		0–1	1–2	4–1	0–1	2–2	2–1
Skënderbeu	2–0	2–0	3–0	3–1	2–0	2–0	3–0	1–0		2–0	0–0	2–0	4–2	0–1
Shkumbini	0–0	1–0	2–1	0–3	1–1	1–1	1–1	2–1	0–1		0–1	1–0	2–1	1–0
Teuta	2–1	1–0	3–0	2–1	1–0	1–1	1–0	2–0	0–2	3–0		1–1	3–1	1–0
Tirana	2–0	1–1	2–1	3–6	0–0	1–2	2–1	2–1	1–0	3–0	1–1		1–0	1–0
Tomori	1–0	1–0	0–0	0–2	1–2	2–5	2–0	1–1	0–0	0–0	4–1	0–1		2–2
Vllaznia	1–1	0–1	1–0	3–3	2–0	1–0	1–0	3–0	1–3	1–0	2–0	2–1	0–1	

Source: Albanian Football Association
Legend: Blue = home team win; Yellow = draw; Red = away team win.

=== Positions by round ===
Team ╲ Round	1	2	3	4	5	6	7	8	9	10	11	12	13	14	15	16	17	18	19	20	21	22	23	24	25	26
Skënderbeu	1	1	1	1	1	1	1	1	1	1	1	1	1	1	1	1	1	1	1	1	1	1	1	1	1	1
Kukësi	10	8	10	6	8	5	5	5	3	2	4	2	5	4	5	4	5	4	5	4	4	2	2	2	2	2
Teuta	2	7	9	10	9	6	7	9	6	4	2	4	2	2	2	2	2	2	2	2	3	4	4	3	3	3
Flamurtari	7	10	6	8	10	10	11	10	9	9	8	8	7	6	3	3	3	3	3	3	2	3	3	4	4	4
Tirana	3	2	2	2	2	2	3	4	7	5	3	5	3	3	4	5	4	6	6	5	5	6	5	5	5	5
Vllaznia	14	12	5	7	4	4	4	2	4	7	6	7	8	8	7	8	6	5	4	6	6	5	6	7	7	6
Laçi	9	6	3	4	5	7	6	8	5	3	5	3	6	5	6	6	8	8	8	7	7	7	7	6	6	7
Kastrioti	8	5	8	5	6	8	8	6	10	10	10	10	10	9	9	9	7	7	7	8	8	8	8	8	8	8
Besa	5	3	4	3	3	3	2	3	2	8	7	9	9	10	10	10	10	10	10	10	9	10	10	9	9	9
Bylis	6	9	12	13	13	11	9	7	8	6	9	6	4	7	7	7	9	9	9	9	10	9	9	10	10	10
Shkumbini	12	13	11	11	11	12	12	12	12	12	12	12	11	11	11	11	11	12	12	12	11	11	11	11	11	11
Tomori	13	14	14	14	14	14	14	14	14	14	13	14	14	14	13	13	13	13	13	13	13	13	13	13	13	12
Luftëtari	11	4	7	9	7	9	10	11	11	11	11	11	12	12	12	12	12	11	11	11	12	12	12	12	12	13
Apolonia	4	11	13	12	12	13	13	13	13	13	14	13	13	13	14	14	14	14	14	14	14	14	14	14	14	14

Leader and UEFA Champions League second qualifying round
UEFA Europa League first qualifying round
2013–14 Kategoria e Parë

Source: kicker.de

== Season statistics ==
=== Top scorers ===
Rank	Player	Club	Goals
1	(Albania) Migen Memelli	Flamurtari	19
2	(Serbia) Lazar Popović	Kukësi	16
3	(Albania) Gjergji Muzaka	Flamurtari	12
3	(Croatia) Pero Pejić	Skënderbeu	12
5	(Nigeria) Solomonson Izuchukwuka	Bylis	11
6	(Albania) Sebino Plaku	Skënderbeu	10
6	(Albania) Daniel Xhafaj	Teuta	10
8	(Albania) Igli Allmuça	Kukësi	9
8	(Albania) Gilman Lika	Tirana	9
10	(Albania) Andi Ribaj	Apolonia	8
10	(Albania) Erjon Vucaj	Laçi	8

=== Hat-tricks ===
Player	For	Against	Result	Date
(Croatia) Pero Pejić	Skënderbeu Korçë	Vllaznia Shkodër	1–3	24 August 2012
(Albania) Migen Memelli	Flamurtari Vlorë	Luftëtari Gjirokastër	2–3	27 October 2012
(Nigeria) Solomonson Izuchukwuka	Bylis Ballsh	Laçi	4–0	28 October 2012
(Albania) Migen Memelli	Flamurtari Vlorë	Bylis Ballsh	3–0	13 February 2013
(Serbia) Lazar Popović	Kukësi	Shkumbini Peqin	5–1	30 March 2013

== Awards ==
=== Monthly awards ===
Month	Player of the Month		
Month	Player	Club	Ref
September	(Albania) Pero Pejić	Skënderbeu Korçë	
October	(Albania) Sabien Lilaj	Skënderbeu Korçë	
November	(Albania) Gerhard Progni	FK Kukësi	
February	(Albania) Migen Memelli	Flamurtari Vlorë	
March	(Albania) Gjergji Muzaka	Flamurtari Vlorë	
April	(Albania) Gilman Lika	KF Tirana	
