= 2015–16 FK Partizani Tirana season =

Partizani Tirana
2015–16 season
- President: Gazmend Demi
- Head coach: Sulejman Starova (until 28 December 2015); Andrea Agostinelli (from 4 January 2016)
- Stadium: Qemal Stafa Stadium
- Kategoria Superiore: 2nd
- Albanian Cup: Quarter-finals
- Europa League: Second qualifying round
- Top goalscorer: League: Xhevahir Sukaj (21); All: Xhevahir Sukaj (22)
- Highest home attendance: 10,031 vs Tirana (3 October 2015)
- Lowest home attendance: 100 vs Lushnja (4 November 2015)
Home colours	Away colours

In the 2015–16 season, Partizani Tirana competed in the Kategoria Superiore for the third consecutive season. The club finished second at the end of the season, which was their best result since 2008.

== First-team squad ==
Squad at end of season

Note: Flags indicate national team as defined under FIFA eligibility rules; some limited exceptions apply. Players may hold more than one non-FIFA nationality.

No.	Pos.	Nation	Player
1	GK	ALB	Dashamir Xhika
2	DF	ALB	Harallamb Qaqi (on loan from Hellas Verona)
3	DF	MNE	Marko Vidović
4	DF	KOS	Arbnor Fejzullahu
5	DF	ALB	Gëzim Krasniqi
6	MF	BRA	Filipe Gomes (on loan from Perugia)
7	FW	KOS	Astrit Fazliu
10	MF	ALB	Idriz Batha (vice-captain)
11	DF	ALB	Franc Veliu
12	GK	ALB	Alban Hoxha (captain)
14	MF	KOS	Mentor Mazrekaj
15	DF	ALB	Ditmar Bicaj
16	MF	ALB	Ylber Ramadani
17	FW	SRB	Stevan Račić

No.	Pos.	Nation	Player
18	MF	ALB	Jurgen Bardhi
19	MF	ALB	Lorenc Trashi
20	FW	ALB	Xhevahir Sukaj
21	MF	ALB	Asion Daja
22	DF	KOS	Labinot Ibrahimi
27	FW	ARG	Agustín Torassa
28	MF	ALB	Realdo Fili
30	MF	ALB	Lauren Ismailaj
35	GK	ALB	Mario Dajsinani
36	DF	NGR	Sodiq Atanda
88	FW	ALB	Emiljano Vila
99	DF	ALB	Renaldo Kalari
—	MF	ALB	Fabio Hasa
—	FW	ALB	Jurgen Vatnikaj

== Transfers ==
=== Summer ===
In: Note: Flags indicate national team as defined under FIFA eligibility rules; some limited exceptions apply. Players may hold more than one non-FIFA nationality.

No.	Pos.	Nation	Player
2	DF	ALB	Harallamb Qaqi (from (Italy) Chievo Verona)
3	DF	MNE	Marko Vidović (from (Hungary) Budapest Honvéd)
6	MF	MNE	Jovan Nikolić (from (Montenegro) Sutjeska Nikšić)
8	MF	ALB	Alsid Tafili (from Vllaznia Shkodër)
9	FW	ALB	Sebino Plaku (from (Poland) Śląsk Wrocław)
11	MF	COL	Carlos Robles (from (Colombia) Deportes Quindío)
15	DF	ALB	Ditmar Bicaj (from (Iran) Tractor Sazi)
20	FW	ALB	Xhevahir Sukaj (from (Iran) Sepahan)
34	FW	ITA	Emanuele Morini (from (Italy) Viterbese)
35	GK	ALB	Bledar Vashaku (from Tomori Berat)
99	DF	ALB	Renaldo Kalari (from KF Tirana)

Out: Note: Flags indicate national team as defined under FIFA eligibility rules; some limited exceptions apply. Players may hold more than one non-FIFA nationality.

No.	Pos.	Nation	Player
6	DF	MKD	Ardian Cuculi (to (North Macedonia) Shkëndija)
11	MF	MKD	Nderim Nexhipi (to Flamurtari Vlorë)
18	MF	ALB	Amir Rrahmani (to (Croatia) RNK Split)
20	MF	MKD	Bunjamin Shabani (to (North Macedonia) Renova)
30	FW	ALB	Jurgen Vatnikaj (on loan to Tërbuni Pukë)
35	GK	ALB	Fabio Gjonikaj (on loan to Tërbuni Pukë)
77	DF	ALB	Arben Muskaj (loan return to (Greece) PAS Giannina)
88	MF	ALB	Emiljano Vila (to (Greece) Kerkyra)

=== Winter ===
In: Note: Flags indicate national team as defined under FIFA eligibility rules; some limited exceptions apply. Players may hold more than one non-FIFA nationality.

No.	Pos.	Nation	Player
6	MF	BRA	Filipe Gomes (on loan from (Italy) Perugia)
16	DF	ALB	Franc Veliu (from Kukësi)
27	MF	ARG	Agustín Torassa (from (Argentina) Huracán)
28	MF	ALB	Realdo Fili (from Apolonia Fier)
30	FW	ALB	Jurgen Vatnikaj (loan return from Tërbuni Pukë)
36	DF	NGR	Sodiq Atanda (from Apolonia Fier)
88	MF	ALB	Emiljano Vila (from (Azerbaijan) Inter Baku)
–	FW	ARG	Federico Haberkorn (from (Mexico) Cafetaleros de Tapachula)

Out: Note: Flags indicate national team as defined under FIFA eligibility rules; some limited exceptions apply. Players may hold more than one non-FIFA nationality.

No.	Pos.	Nation	Player
6	DF	MNE	Jovan Nikolić (Free agent)
8	MF	ALB	Arsid Tafili (to Vllaznia Shkodër)
9	FW	ALB	Sebino Plaku (to Skënderbeu Korçë)
30	GK	ALB	Bledar Vashaku (Free agent)
34	FW	ALB	Emanuele Morini (Free agent)
44	DF	ALB	Endrit Vrapi (to Vllaznia Shkodër)
70	FW	ALB	Dorian Bylykbashi (Retired)
–	FW	ARG	Federico Haberkorn (Free agent)

== Competitions ==
=== Kategoria Superiore ===
==== League table ====
Pos	Team	Pld	W	D	L	GF	GA	GD	Pts	Qualification or relegation
1	Skënderbeu (Note: Skënderbeu would have qualified for the Champions League second qualifying round, but were excluded from participating in the 2016–17 European competitions by UEFA for match-fixing.) (C)	36	25	4	7	73	27	+46	79	
2	Partizani	36	21	11	4	51	21	+30	74	Qualification for the Champions League second qualifying round
3	Kukësi	36	18	9	9	41	25	+16	63 (Note: Kukësi ahead of Teuta on head-to-head record; Kukësi–Teuta 3–0, Teuta–Kukësi 1–0, Kukësi–Teuta 2–2, Teuta–Kukësi 0–0.)	Qualification for the Europa League first qualifying round (Note: Kukësi qualified for the Europa League first qualifying round by winning the 2015–16 Albanian Cup.)
4	Teuta	36	18	9	9	43	28	+15	63	Qualification for the Europa League first qualifying round
5	Tirana	36	13	14	9	37	25	+12	53	

Source: Albanian Football Association (in Albanian), Soccerway
Rules for classification: 1) Points; 2) Head-to-head points; 3) Head-to-head goal difference; 4) Head-to-head goals scored; 5) Goal difference; 6) Goals scored; 7) Draw.
(C) Champions

==== Results summary ====
Overall								Home						Away					
Pld	W	D	L	GF	GA	GD	Pts	W	D	L	GF	GA	GD	W	D	L	GF	GA	GD
36	21	11	4	51	21	+30	74	11	4	3	30	11	+19	10	7	1	21	10	+11

Source: Competitive matches

==== Results by round ====
Round	1	2	3	4	5	6	7	8	9	10	11	12	13	14	15	16	17	18	19	20	21	22	23	24	25	26	27	28	29	30	31	32	33	34	35	36
Ground	H	H	A	H	A	H	A	H	A	A	A	H	A	H	A	H	A	H	H	H	A	H	A	H	A	H	A	A	A	H	A	H	A	H	A	H
Result	D	W	W	W	W	W	W	W	W	W	D	W	W	W	D	D	L	L	W	D	D	W	D	W	W	D	W	D	D	W	W	W	D	L	W	L
Position	5	3	2	2	2	2	2	1	1	1	1	1	1	1	1	2	2	2	2	2	2	2	2	2	2	2	2	2	2	2	2	2	2	2	2	2

Source: Competitive matches
A = Away; H = Home; W = Win; D = Draw; L = Loss

==== Matches ====
21 August 2015 1	Partizani Tirana	1–1	Laçi	Tirana
20:00 CEST	Batha (yellow card) 31'; Kalari (yellow card) 43'; Sukaj (yellow card) 52' (goal) 65'; Ibrahimi (yellow card) 55'; Trashi (yellow card) 78'	Report	Çela 55' (yellow card) 64'; Mustafa (yellow card) 70' (yellow-red card) 90+3'; Gocaj (yellow card) 84'	Stadium: Qemal Stafa Stadium; Attendance: 2,500; Referee: Enea Jorgji

28 August 2015 2	Partizani Tirana	2–1	Flamurtari Vlorë	Tirana
20:00 CEST	Mazrekaj (yellow card) 51'; Vrapi (yellow card) 52'; Trashi 73'; Bicaj (yellow card) 90+3'; Sukaj 90+5' (pen.)	Report	Trapp (yellow card) 51' (goal) 55'; Popkhadze (yellow card) 52'; Pashaj (yellow card) 82' (yellow-red card) 90+5'; Kuqi (yellow card) 90+2'; Greca (yellow card) 90+3'	Stadium: Qemal Stafa Stadium; Attendance: 1,540; Referee: Kridens Meta

13 September 2015 3	Vllaznia Shkodër	1–2	Partizani Tirana	Pukë (Note: The match was held in Ismail Xhemali Stadium due to reconstruction of Loro Boriçi Stadium.)
16:00 CEST	Arbëri (yellow card) 10' (yellow-red card) 43'; Krymi 29'	Report	Kalari (yellow card) 31'; Sukaj 45+3' (pen.); Fejzullahu (yellow card) 63'; Batha (yellow card) 68'; Morini 82'	Stadium: Ismail Xhemali Stadium; Attendance: 300; Referee: Kreshnik Çjapi

19 September 2015 4	Partizani Tirana	2–0	Kukësi	Tirana
19:00 CEST	Plaku 34'; Sukaj 58' (pen.); Ibrahimi (yellow card) 83'	Report	Jean Carioca (yellow card) 53'	Stadium: Qemal Stafa Stadium; Attendance: 2,500; Referee: Emirjon Sino

26 September 2015 5	Tërbuni Pukë	1–2	Partizani Tirana	Pukë
13:00 CEST	Lila (yellow card) 32'; Milenković (yellow card) 43'; Bicaj 56' (o.g.); Peqini (yellow card) 68'; Karapici (yellow card) 76'; Danaj (yellow card) 77'; Haxho (yellow card) 77'	Report	Sukaj 27' (yellow card) 84'; Bicaj 77'; Mazrekaj (yellow card) 80'; Daja (yellow card) 90+3'	Stadium: Ismail Xhemali Stadium; Attendance: 1,000; Referee: Remzi Sadiku

3 October 2015 6	Partizani Tirana	1–0	Tirana	Tirana
20:45 CEST	Trashi (yellow card) 13'; Sukaj 51'; Račić (yellow card) 84'; Ibrahimi (yellow card) 88'	Report	Teqja (yellow card) 77'; Karan (yellow card) 84'; El. Bakaj (yellow card) 88'; Fortunato (yellow card) 88'	Stadium: Qemal Stafa Stadium; Attendance: 10,031; Referee: Lorenc Jemini

17 October 2015 7	Bylis Ballsh	1–2	Partizani Tirana	Ballsh
14:00 CEST	Peposhi 7' (red card) 90+1'; Basriu (yellow card) 56'; Hoxhaj (yellow card) 69'	Report	Batha 9'; G. Krasniqi (yellow card) 40'; Daja (yellow card) 54'; Sukaj 90'	Stadium: Adush Muça Stadium; Attendance: 800; Referee: Andi Koçi

25 October 2015 8	Partizani Tirana	2–1	Skënderbeu Korçë	Tirana
19:00 CET	G. Krasniqi 23'; Ibrahimi 33' (yellow card) 34'; Daja (yellow card) 89'; Račić (yellow card) 90+3'	Report	Salihi 8'; Arapi (yellow card) 37'; Vangjeli (yellow card) 37'; Radaš (yellow card) 81'	Stadium: Qemal Stafa Stadium; Attendance: 6,031; Referee: Lorenc Jemini

1 November 2015 9	Teuta Durrës	0–1	Partizani Tirana	Durrës
17:00 CET	Hodo (yellow card) 20'; Hila (yellow card) 68'	Report	Trashi 72'	Stadium: Niko Dovana Stadium; Attendance: 2,000; Referee: Emirjon Sino

8 November 2015 10	Laçi	2–3	Partizani Tirana	Elbasan (Note: The match was held at Elbasan Arena due to reconstruction of the field of Laçi Stadium.)
13:00 CET	Gocaj 7'; Adeniyi 33'; Çela (yellow card) 66'	Report	Fazliu 4'; Sukaj 21'; Mazrekaj 50'; Fejzullahu (yellow card) 64'; Ibrahimi (yellow card) 72'	Stadium: Elbasan Arena; Attendance: 631; Referee: Lorenc Jemini

18 November 2015 11	Flamurtari Vlorë	0–0	Partizani Tirana	Vlorë
17:00 CET	Lena (yellow card) 46'; Nexhipi (yellow card) 54'; Tskhadadze (yellow card) 65'; Greca (yellow card) 82'	Report	Ibrahimi (yellow card) 86'; Račić (yellow card) 88'	Stadium: Flamurtari Stadium; Attendance: 1,500; Referee: Emirjon Sino

23 November 2015 12	Partizani Tirana	1–0	Vllaznia Shkodër	Tirana
17:00 CET	Fazliu 90' (yellow card) 90'; Tafili (yellow card) 90+3'	Report	Krymi (yellow card) 14'; Kalaja (yellow card) 50'; Cicmil (yellow card) 62'; Pjeshka (yellow card) 70'	Stadium: Qemal Stafa Stadium; Attendance: 1,000; Referee: Laver Alla

28 November 2015 13	Kukësi	0–1	Partizani Tirana	Kukës
13:00 CET	Jean Carioca (yellow card) 85'; Musolli (yellow card) 88'	Report	Mazrekaj 24'; Batha (yellow card) 40'	Stadium: Zeqir Ymeri Stadium; Attendance: 2,000; Referee: Bardhyl Pashaj

2 December 2015 14	Partizani Tirana	4–0	Tërbuni Pukë	Tirana
17:00 CET	Ibrahimi 31'; Račić (yellow card) 40' (goal) 49', 62'; Sukaj 58'	Report	Tusha (yellow card) 27'; Rexha (yellow card) 28'; Sulollari (yellow card) 44'	Stadium: Qemal Stafa Stadium; Attendance: 1,500; Referee: Eldorjan Hamiti

7 December 2015 15	Tirana	0–0	Partizani Tirana	Tirana
14:00 CET	Hoxhallari (yellow card) 38'	Report	Kalari (yellow card) 16'; Vrapi (yellow card) 90+3'	Stadium: Selman Stërmasi Stadium; Attendance: 6,531; Referee: Lorenc Jemini

12 December 2015 16	Partizani Tirana	1–1	Bylis Ballsh	Tirana
17:00 CET	Batha (yellow card) 38' (yellow-red card) 38'; Račić 75'	Report	Hoxhaj 15' (yellow card) 44'; Simić (yellow card) 36'; Ruçi (yellow card) 52'; Mbella (yellow card) 63'; Asani (yellow card) 81'	Stadium: Qemal Stafa Stadium; Attendance: 1,100; Referee: Eldorjan Hamiti

19 December 2015 17	Skënderbeu Korçë	1–0	Partizani Tirana	Korçë
16:00 CET	Olayinka 12'; Progni (yellow card) 45'; Radaš (yellow card) 61'; Arapi (yellow card) 62'; Vangjeli (yellow card) 77'; Latifi (yellow card) 80'	Report	Bicaj (yellow card) 5'; Mazrekaj (yellow card) 42'; Sukaj (red card) 78'	Stadium: Skënderbeu Stadium; Attendance: 4,200; Referee: Enea Jorgji

23 December 2015 18	Partizani Tirana	0–1	Teuta Durrës	Tirana
17:00 CET	G. Krasniqi (yellow card) 27'; Daja (yellow card) 54'	Report	Lukić 28'; Hila (yellow card) 37'; Kuka (yellow card) 73'; Hoxha (yellow card) 78'; Musta (yellow card) 80'; Shehi (yellow card) 90+4'	Stadium: Qemal Stafa Stadium; Attendance: 0 (Note: The match was played behind the doors closed.); Referee: Lorenc Jemini

30 January 2016 19	Partizani Tirana	2–0	Laçi	Tirana
17:00 CET	Račić 10' (yellow card) 46'; Trashi (yellow card) 20'; Filipe (yellow card) 40'; Hoxha (red card) 51'; Vila 72'	Report	Musaj (yellow card) 26'; Sheta (yellow card) 60'; Malindi (yellow card) 65' (yellow-red card) 85'	Stadium: Qemal Stafa Stadium; Attendance: 1,700; Referee: Kridens Meta

6 February 2016 20	Partizani Tirana	1–1	Flamurtari Vlorë	Tirana
17:00 CET	Sukaj (yellow card) 35' (goal) 88'	Report	Idrizaj (yellow card) 12'; Hoxha 38'; Telushi (yellow card) 42' (yellow-red card) 53'; Lucas (yellow card) 63'	Stadium: Qemal Stafa Stadium; Attendance: 3,100; Referee: Bardhyl Pashaj

13 February 2016 21	Vllaznia Shkodër	1–1	Partizani Tirana	Shkodër
13:00 CET	Kalaja (yellow card) 46'; Krymi (yellow card) 65'; Dibra 90'; Cicmil (yellow card) 90+1'	Report	Račić 22'; Filipe (yellow card) 46'	Stadium: Reshit Rusi Stadium; Attendance: 1,000; Referee: Kridens Meta

22 February 2016 22	Partizani Tirana	1–0	Kukësi	Tirana
18:00 CET	Kalari (yellow card) 41'; Sukaj 50'	Report	Ferraj (yellow card) 80'; Shameti (red card) 90+1'	Stadium: Qemal Stafa Stadium; Attendance: 2,100; Referee: Bardhyl Pashaj

27 February 2016 23	Tërbuni Pukë	0–0	Partizani Tirana	Pukë
13:30 CET	Jovanović (yellow card) 20'; Dedyn (yellow card) 38'; Beci (yellow card) 57'; Marku (yellow card) 87'	Report	Bicaj (red card) 54'; Ibrahimi (yellow card) 88'	Stadium: Ismail Xhemali Stadium; Attendance: 500; Referee: Olsi Sokoli

4 March 2016 24	Partizani Tirana	2–0	Tirana	Tirana
18:00 CET	Sukaj 6'; Fejzullahu 12'; Kalari (yellow card) 62'	Report	El. Bakaj (yellow card) 55' (yellow-red card) 55'; Teqja (yellow card) 60'; Smajli (yellow card) 65'	Stadium: Qemal Stafa Stadium; Attendance: 8,531; Referee: Lorenc Jemini

9 March 2016 25	Bylis Ballsh	0–2	Partizani Tirana	Ballsh
14:00 CET	Alla (yellow card) 18'; Bilali (yellow card) 27'	Report	Vila 11' (yellow card) 36'; Trashi 49'; Torassa (yellow card) 69'; G. Krasniqi (yellow card) 87'; Daja (yellow card) 88'	Stadium: Adush Muça Stadium; Attendance: 1,000; Referee: Remzi Sadiku

14 March 2016 26	Partizani Tirana	1–1	Skënderbeu Korçë	Tirana
19:00 CET	Račić 20' (yellow card) 21'; Batha (yellow card) 79'	Report	Abazi (yellow card) 37'; Orelesi (yellow card) 39'; Vangjeli (yellow card) 48' (goal) 88'; Esquerdinha (yellow card) 78'; Osmani (yellow card) 79' (yellow-red card) 89'	Stadium: Qemal Stafa Stadium; Attendance: 4,500; Referee: Enea Jorgji

20 March 2016 27	Teuta Durrës	0–2	Partizani Tirana	Durrës
17:00 CET	Lukić (yellow card) 31'; Lena (yellow card) 75'; Hila (yellow card) 90'	Report	Atanda (yellow card) 46'; Batha 52'; Filipe (yellow card) 60'; Daja 87'; Fazliu (yellow card) 90+2'	Stadium: Niko Dovana Stadium; Attendance: 2,000; Referee: Kridens Meta

2 April 2016 28	Laçi	0–0	Partizani Tirana	Laç
16:00 CEST	Sefgjinaj (yellow card) 1'; Sheta (yellow card) 22'; Veliaj (yellow card) 71'	Report	Daja (yellow card) 1'	Stadium: Laçi Stadium; Attendance: 1,000; Referee: Ardian Beqiri

10 April 2016 29	Flamurtari Vlorë	1–1	Partizani Tirana	Vlorë
19:00 CEST	Curri (yellow card) 45+1' (red card) 90+3'; Lushtaku (yellow card) 73'; B. Krasniqi (yellow card) 84'; Danilo Alves 86'	Report	Sukaj 40' (yellow card) 80'	Stadium: Flamurtari Stadium; Attendance: 400; Referee: Kridens Meta

17 April 2016 30	Partizani Tirana	3–0	Vllaznia Shkodër	Tirana
19:00 CEST	Bicaj (yellow card) 45'; Sukaj 60', 90'; Trashi (yellow card) 68'; Fili 87'	Report	Rudović (yellow card) 34'; Pjeshka (yellow card) 65'	Stadium: Qemal Stafa Stadium; Attendance: 4,000; Referee: Lorenc Jemini

25 April 2016 31	Kukësi	0–1	Partizani Tirana	Kukës
16:00 CEST	Jean Carioca (yellow card) 41'; Lladrovci (yellow card) 50' (yellow-red card) 84'; Erick Flores (yellow card) 60'; Musolli (yellow card) 90+1'	Report	Batha (yellow card) 11'; Hoxha (red card) 45'; Fejzullahu (yellow card) 69'; Sukaj 90+3'	Stadium: Zeqir Ymeri Stadium; Attendance: 3,000; Referee: Lorenc Jemini

30 April 2016 32	Partizani Tirana	4–0	Tërbuni Pukë	Tirana
19:00 CEST	Sukaj 19', 47', 64'; Vila 25'; Daja (yellow card) 74'	Report	Dedyn (yellow card) 85'; Kaçaj (yellow card) 90+1'	Stadium: Qemal Stafa Stadium; Attendance: 1,500; Referee: Ditmar Jubica

4 May 2016 33	Tirana	2–2	Partizani Tirana	Tirana
18:30 CEST	Muça 28' (yellow card) 40' (yellow-red card) 56'; Ed. Bakaj (yellow card) 38'; El. Bakaj 47' (yellow card) 72'	Report	Sukaj 21' (yellow card) 90+3'; Atanda (yellow card) 25'; Batha (yellow card) 48'; Filipe (yellow card) 65'; Fili (yellow card) 81' (goal) 90+5'	Stadium: Selman Stërmasi Stadium; Attendance: 5,761; Referee: Lorenc Jemini

8 May 2016 34	Partizani Tirana	1–2	Bylis Ballsh	Tirana
19:00 CEST	Račić (yellow card) 63' (red card) 90'; Fili 70'	Report	Hoxhaj 24', 86' (yellow card) 86'; Simić (yellow card) 63' (yellow-red card) 90'; Fejzaj (yellow card) 73'; Alla (yellow card) 76'	Stadium: Qemal Stafa Stadium; Attendance: 1,500; Referee: Ditmar Jubica

13 May 2016 35	Skënderbeu Korçë	0–1	Partizani Tirana	Korçë
19:00 CEST	Salihi (yellow card) 22'; Lilaj (yellow card) 67'; Osmani (yellow card) 83'	Report	Atanda (yellow card) 33'; Kalari (yellow card) 39'; Vila 90'	Stadium: Skënderbeu Stadium; Attendance: 8,000; Referee: Kridens Meta

18 May 2016 36	Partizani Tirana	1–2	Teuta Durrës	Tirana
17:00 CEST	Sukaj 35'	Report	Kotobelli (yellow card) 45+1'; Lamçja 73'; Hila 90+3' (yellow card) 90+5'	Stadium: Qemal Stafa Stadium; Attendance: 5,000; Referee: Bardhyl Pashaj

=== Albanian Cup ===
==== First round ====
16 September 2015 First leg	Korabi Peshkopi	0–5	Partizani Tirana	Pezë Helmës
16:00 CEST	Çunaj (yellow card) 38'; Kolgega (yellow card) 63'	Report	Plaku 8', 32'; Morini 38'; Çunaj 45' (o.g.); Vidović (yellow card) 57'; Ibrahimi 66' (pen.); Bylykbashi (yellow card) 75'	Stadium: Internacional Complex; Attendance: 250; Referee: Indrit Ujka

29 September 2015 Second leg	Partizani Tirana	0–2 (5–2 agg.)	Korabi Peshkopi	Pezë Helmës
17:30 CEST		Report	Kolgega 36', 57'	Stadium: Internacional Complex; Attendance: 50; Referee: Mikel Dyrmishi

==== Second round ====
21 October 2015 First leg	Lushnja	1–3	Partizani Tirana	Lushnjë
14:30 CEST	Dervishi (yellow card) 34'; Mezini 39'; Alushi (yellow card) 43'; G. Çela (yellow card) 61'	Report	Plaku 12', 77'; Račić 60'	Stadium: Abdurrahman Roza Haxhiu Stadium; Attendance: 300; Referee: Robert Shoshaj

4 November 2015 Second leg	Partizani Tirana	3–0 (6–1 agg.)	Lushnja	Kamëz
14:00 CET	Ismailaj 4'; Morini 42'; Bylykbashi 76'	Report		Stadium: Kompleksi Stërvitor i Ekipeve Kombëtare; Attendance: 30; Referee: Orlando Kuka

==== Quarter-finals ====
23 January 2016 First leg	Laçi	2–0	Partizani Tirana	Laç
14:00 CET	E. Çela (yellow card) 28' (yellow-red card) 77'; James 49', 65'; Veliaj (yellow card) 54'; Sheta (yellow card) 84'	Report	Trashi (yellow card) 15'; Daja (yellow card) 31'	Stadium: Laçi Stadium; Attendance: 1,000; Referee: Laver Alla

17 February 2016 Second leg	Partizani Tirana	1–0 (1–2 agg.)	Laçi	Tirana
17:00 CET	Bardhi (yellow card) 46'; Torassa (yellow card) 47'; G. Krasniqi (yellow card) 61'; Sukaj 65'; Atanda (yellow card) 75'	Report	Sefgjinaj (yellow card) 36'; Ademir (yellow card) 66'; Veliaj (yellow card) 85'; Sheta (yellow card) 90+2'	Stadium: Qemal Stafa Stadium; Attendance: 1,500; Referee: Andi Koçi

=== UEFA Europa League ===
==== First qualifying round ====
2 July 2015 First leg	Strømsgodset (Norway)	3–1	(Albania) Partizani Tirana	Drammen, Norway
19:00 CEST	Vilsvik 21'; Hanin (yellow card) 53'; Ogunjimi 66'; Vilsvik 73'; Abu (yellow card) 86'	Report	Račić (yellow card) 44'; Batha (yellow card) 45'; Fazliu 68'	Stadium: Marienlyst Stadion; Attendance: 3,273; Referee: Paul McLaughlin (Republic of Ireland)

9 July 2015 Second leg	Partizani Tirana (Albania)	0–1 (1–4 agg.)	(Norway) Strømsgodset	Tirana, Albania
20:00 CEST	Batha (yellow card) 59'	Report	Kastrati (yellow card) 33'; Wikheim (yellow card) 45+2'; Ovenstad (yellow card) 55'; Ogunjimi (yellow card) 85'; Moen 90+3'	Stadium: Qemal Stafa Stadium; Attendance: 4,200; Referee: Tobias Stieler (Germany)
