= List of Albanian football transfers winter 2015–16 =

The 2015–16 winter transfer window for Albanian football transfers opened on 1 January and closes on 1 February. Additionally, players without a club may join at any time, clubs may sign players on loan at any time, and clubs may sign a goalkeeper on an emergency loan if they have no registered goalkeeper available. This list includes transfers featuring only Albanian Superliga clubs which were completed after the end of the summer 2015 transfer window and before the end of the 2015–16 winter window. The transfer window is open for all clubs, whereas when the transfer window closes, no transfers can take place. 1 February 2016 is the transfer deadline day.

== Superliga ==
=== Bylis Ballsh ===
In: Note: Flags indicate national team as defined under FIFA eligibility rules; some limited exceptions apply. Players may hold more than one non-FIFA nationality.

No.	Pos.	Nation	Player
1	GK	ALB	Stivi Frashëri (Free agent)
2	DF	SRB	Duško Dukić (from (Armenia) Alashkert)
4	DF	ALB	Julian Brahja (from Tërbuni Pukë)
6	DF	ALB	Albi Alla (on loan from Skënderbeu Korçë)
10	DF	BRA	Edmílson (Free agent)
20	MF	ALB	Bruno Lipi (Free agent)
25	FW	NGA	Solomonson Izuchukwuka (Free agent)
67	FW	ARG	Juan Manuel Varea (from (Bulgaria) Cherno More Varna)
88	DF	KOS	Samir Sahiti (from (Kosovo) Trepça'89)

Out: Note: Flags indicate national team as defined under FIFA eligibility rules; some limited exceptions apply. Players may hold more than one non-FIFA nationality.

No.	Pos.	Nation	Player
6	DF	ALB	Serxhio Gjonbrati (Free agent)
10	FW	ALB	Bekim Kuli (to Lushnja)
16	FW	BRA	Ronaille Calheira (Free agent)
18	DF	FRA	Abdelaye Diakité (Free agent)
67	FW	ALB	Enriko Papa (to Tirana)

=== Flamurtari Vlorë ===
In: Note: Flags indicate national team as defined under FIFA eligibility rules; some limited exceptions apply. Players may hold more than one non-FIFA nationality.

No.	Pos.	Nation	Player
2	DF	KOS	Besnik Krasniqi (from (Kosovo) Istogu)
3	DF	ALB	Kristi Marku (from (Hungary) Budapest Honvéd)
8	MF	URU	Ignacio Nicolini (from (Uruguay) Racing Club)
13	DF	URU	Pablo Lacoste (from (Uruguay) Racing Club)
18	DF	KOS	Dardan Çerkini (from (Kosovo) Drita)
87	FW	BRA	Henrique (from (Brazil) Guarani)
97	MF	BRA	Lucas Caniggia (from (Brazil) Corinthians)
99	FW	BRA	Danilo Alves (from (Brazil) São Bento)
–	DF	KOS	Ilir Berisha (from (Sweden) Gelfle)
–	MF	ALB	Rigers Dushku (Free agent)

Out: Note: Flags indicate national team as defined under FIFA eligibility rules; some limited exceptions apply. Players may hold more than one non-FIFA nationality.

No.	Pos.	Nation	Player
5	DF	CRO	Ivan Fuštar (Free agent)
7	DF	CZE	Petr Trapp (Free agent)
8	MF	MKD	Nijaz Lena (to Teuta Durrës)
9	FW	ALB	Mario Morina (to Kukësi)
10	MF	MKD	Nderim Nexhipi (to (North Macedonia) Shkëndija)
12	FW	MTQ	Bédi Buval (Free agent)
22	FW	ALB	Dejvi Bregu (Free agent)
27	DF	GEO	Giorgi Popkhadze (Free agent)
28	FW	GEO	Bachana Tskhadadze (Free agent)
99	DF	ALB	Valdo Zeqaj (Free agent)

=== Kukësi ===
In: Note: Flags indicate national team as defined under FIFA eligibility rules; some limited exceptions apply. Players may hold more than one non-FIFA nationality.

No.	Pos.	Nation	Player
8	FW	MKD	Izair Emini (from (North Macedonia) Renova)
11	MF	ALB	Nertil Ferraj (from Teuta Durrës)
18	FW	ALB	Mario Morina (from Flamurtari Vlorë)
19	MF	ALB	Eni Imami (from Dinamo Tirana)
25	FW	CRO	Mario Mijatović (from (Croatia) Grafičar-Vodovod Osijek)
21	FW	CRO	Matija Dvorneković (from (Croatia) Gorica)
30	DF	KOS	Lapidar Lladrovci (from (Kosovo) Feronikeli)
–	FW	ALB	Resul Kastrati (from Teuta Durrës)
–	FW	ALB	Mergent Sulmataj (from Tërbuni Pukë)

Out: Note: Flags indicate national team as defined under FIFA eligibility rules; some limited exceptions apply. Players may hold more than one non-FIFA nationality.

No.	Pos.	Nation	Player
5	DF	ALB	Kostandin Ndoni (Free agent)
6	DF	ALB	Klaudio Çema (to Tërbuni Pukë)
11	DF	ALB	Franc Veliu (to Partizani Tirana)
18	MF	ALB	Eglantin Dhima (to Sopoti Librazhd)

=== Laçi ===
In: Note: Flags indicate national team as defined under FIFA eligibility rules; some limited exceptions apply. Players may hold more than one non-FIFA nationality.

No.	Pos.	Nation	Player
7	FW	ALB	Albi Dosti (from (Bulgaria) Montana)
18	MF	ALB	Regi Lushkja (from Besa Kavajë)
17	MF	ALB	Enco Malindi (from Tërbuni Pukë)
20	DF	BRA	Ademir (on loan from Skënderbeu Korçë)

Out: Note: Flags indicate national team as defined under FIFA eligibility rules; some limited exceptions apply. Players may hold more than one non-FIFA nationality.

No.	Pos.	Nation	Player
6	DF	ALB	Mikelanxhelo Bardhi (to Iliria Fushë-Krujë)
8	FW	NGA	James Adeniyi (to Skënderbeu Korçë)
16	MF	ALB	Edison Ndreca (Free agent)
17	MF	ALB	Arsid Kruja (loan return to (Saudi Arabia) Hajer)
18	MF	ALB	Agim Meto (to Luftëtari Gjirokastër)

=== Partizani Tirana ===
In: Note: Flags indicate national team as defined under FIFA eligibility rules; some limited exceptions apply. Players may hold more than one non-FIFA nationality.

No.	Pos.	Nation	Player
6	MF	BRA	Filipe Gomes (on loan from (Italy) Perugia Calcio)
16	DF	ALB	Franc Veliu (from Kukësi)
27	MF	ARG	Agustín Torassa (from (Argentina) Huracán)
28	MF	ALB	Realdo Fili (from Apolonia Fier)
30	FW	ALB	Jurgen Vatnikaj (loan return from Tërbuni Pukë)
36	DF	NGA	Sodiq Atanda (from Apolonia Fier)
88	MF	ALB	Emiljano Vila (from (Azerbaijan) Inter Baku)
–	FW	ARG	Federico Haberkorn (from (Mexico) Cafetaleros de Tapachula)

Out: Note: Flags indicate national team as defined under FIFA eligibility rules; some limited exceptions apply. Players may hold more than one non-FIFA nationality.

No.	Pos.	Nation	Player
6	DF	MNE	Jovan Nikolić (Free agent)
8	MF	ALB	Arsid Tafili (to Vllaznia Shkodër)
9	FW	ALB	Sebino Plaku (to Skënderbeu Korçë)
30	GK	ALB	Bledar Vashaku (Free agent)
34	FW	ALB	Emanuele Morini (Free agent)
44	DF	ALB	Endrit Vrapi (to Vllaznia Shkodër)
70	FW	ALB	Dorian Bylykbashi (Free agent)
–	FW	ARG	Federico Haberkorn (Free agent)

=== Skënderbeu Korçë ===
In: Note: Flags indicate national team as defined under FIFA eligibility rules; some limited exceptions apply. Players may hold more than one non-FIFA nationality.

No.	Pos.	Nation	Player
9	FW	ALB	Sebino Plaku (from Partizani Tirana)
23	FW	MKD	Valmir Nafiu (from (Cyprus) APOEL)
34	FW	BRA	Renatinho (from (Thailand) Chiangrai United)
78	FW	NGA	James Adeniyi (from Laçi)
88	MF	NGA	Nurudeen Orelesi (from (Ukraine) Metalurh Zaporizhya)
–	DF	ALB	Albi Alla (from (Greece) Ergotelis)
–	MF	KOS	Valdrin Rashica (from (Finland) Ekenäs)
–	MF	PAR	Ángel Orué (from (Paraguay) Libertad)

Out: Note: Flags indicate national team as defined under FIFA eligibility rules; some limited exceptions apply. Players may hold more than one non-FIFA nationality.

No.	Pos.	Nation	Player
17	FW	BUL	Ventsislav Hristov (loan return to (Croatia) Rijeka)
20	DF	BRA	Ademir (on loan to Laçi)
23	MF	KOS	Bernard Berisha (to (Russia) Anzhi Makhachkala)
25	MF	KOS	Bujar Shabani (to (Kosovo) Feronikeli)
99	FW	NGA	Peter Olayinka (to (Belgium) Gent)
–	DF	ALB	Albi Alla (on loan to Bylis Ballsh)

=== Teuta Durrës ===
In: Note: Flags indicate national team as defined under FIFA eligibility rules; some limited exceptions apply. Players may hold more than one non-FIFA nationality.

No.	Pos.	Nation	Player
10	MF	MKD	Nijaz Lena (from Flamurtari Vlorë)
18	FW	MKD	Florian Kadriu (on loan from Tirana)
88	FW	BRA	Jhonatan Bernardo (from (Iraq) Al Shorta SC)

Out: Note: Flags indicate national team as defined under FIFA eligibility rules; some limited exceptions apply. Players may hold more than one non-FIFA nationality.

No.	Pos.	Nation	Player
13	DF	ALB	Resul Kastrati (to Kukësi)
18	MF	ALB	Nertil Ferraj (to Kukësi)
21	MF	KOS	Viktor Kuka (Free agent)
23	MF	ALB	Meglid Mihani (to Pogradeci)

=== Tirana ===
In: Note: Flags indicate national team as defined under FIFA eligibility rules; some limited exceptions apply. Players may hold more than one non-FIFA nationality.

No.	Pos.	Nation	Player
1	GK	KOS	Ilir Avdyli (from (Kosovo) Hajvalia)
3	MF	ALB	Enriko Papa (from Bylis Ballsh)
14	FW	BRA	Hugo Almeida (from Portugesa)
24	FW	BRA	Alex Willian (from Icasa)
27	DF	ALB	Endrit Idrizaj (loan return from Apolonia Fier)

Out: Note: Flags indicate national team as defined under FIFA eligibility rules; some limited exceptions apply. Players may hold more than one non-FIFA nationality.

No.	Pos.	Nation	Player
1	GK	ALB	Stivi Frashëri (Free agent)
3	DF	BUL	Martin Kavdanski (to (Bulgaria) Lokomotiv Plovdiv)
14	FW	BRA	Gilberto Fortunato (Free agent)
20	DF	ALB	David Domgjoni (on loan at Kastrioti Krujë)
24	FW	MKD	Florian Kadriu (on loan to Teuta Durrës)

=== Tërbuni Pukë ===
In: Note: Flags indicate national team as defined under FIFA eligibility rules; some limited exceptions apply. Players may hold more than one non-FIFA nationality.

No.	Pos.	Nation	Player
2	DF	ALB	Ergi Borshi (on loan from Vllaznia Shkodër)
4	DF	ALB	Klaudio Çema (from Kukësi)
5	DF	ALB	Dritmir Beci (on loan from Vllaznia Shkodër)
14	DF	SRB	Aleksandar Tasić (from (Switzerland) Le Mont)
21	DF	ALB	Abdurraman Fangaj (on loan from Vllaznia Shkodër)

Out: Note: Flags indicate national team as defined under FIFA eligibility rules; some limited exceptions apply. Players may hold more than one non-FIFA nationality.

No.	Pos.	Nation	Player
5	DF	ALB	Julian Brahja (to Bylis Ballsh)
11	FW	ALB	Enco Malindi (to Laçi)
15	FW	ALB	Jurgen Vatnikaj (loan return to Partizani Tirana)
17	MF	LBR	Abel Gebor (Free agent)
20	FW	ALB	Julian Gërxho (to Dinamo Tirana)
21	FW	ALB	Mergent Sulmataj (to Kukësi)
88	FW	ALB	Arbër Dhrami (to Luftëtari Gjirokastër)

=== Vllaznia Shkodër ===
In: Note: Flags indicate national team as defined under FIFA eligibility rules; some limited exceptions apply. Players may hold more than one non-FIFA nationality.

No.	Pos.	Nation	Player
5	MF	ALB	Arsid Tafili (from Partizani Tirana)
9	FW	ALB	Arenc Dibra (from Besëlidhja Lezhë)
18	DF	MNE	Ronaldo Rudović (from (Germany) Waldhof Mannheim)
21	DF	ALB	Endrit Vrapi (from Partizani Tirana)
–	FW	ALB	Bekim Erkoceviç (from Besëlidhja Lezhë)

Out: Note: Flags indicate national team as defined under FIFA eligibility rules; some limited exceptions apply. Players may hold more than one non-FIFA nationality.

No.	Pos.	Nation	Player
5	DF	KOS	Adnan Haxhaj (Free agent)
9	FW	URU	Sebastián Sosa (to (Uruguay) Club Nacional)
6	DF	ALB	Dritmir Beci (on loan to Tërbuni Pukë)
16	MF	BIH	Semir Hadžibulić (Free agent)
18	DF	ALB	Ergi Borshi (on loan to Tërbuni Pukë)
19	MF	PAR	Santiago Martinez (Free agent)
20	FW	MNE	Darko Pavićević (Free agent)
21	MF	KOS	Kreshnik Lushtaku (Free agent)
–	DF	ALB	Abdurraman Fangaj (on loan to Tërbuni Pukë)
–	FW	LBN	Mohammad Kdouh (Free agent)
