= 2016–17 FK Partizani Tirana season =

Partizani Tirana
2016–17 season
- President: Gazmend Demi
- Head coach: Adolfo Sormani (until 10 October 2016); Sulejman Starova (from 10 October 2016)
- Stadium: Elbasan Arena; Selman Stërmasi Stadium
- Kategoria Superiore: 2nd
- Albanian Cup: Second round
- Champions League: Third qualifying round
- Europa League: Play-off round
- Top goalscorer: League: Caleb Ekuban (17); All: Caleb Ekuban (18)
- Highest home attendance: 7,000 vs Kukësi (5 May 2017)
- Lowest home attendance: 100 vs Kevitan (6 October 2016)
Home colours	Away colours

In the 2016–17 season, Partizani Tirana competed in the Kategoria Superiore for the fourth consecutive season. The club also participated in the UEFA Champions League after Skënderbeu Korçë's exclusion from the European competitions during the season due to the match-fixing. That was the first participation in the Champions League after 23 seasons as well. In the league, Partizani finished in second place again after losing a title race with Kukësi.

== First-team squad ==
Squad at end of season

Note: Flags indicate national team as defined under FIFA eligibility rules; some limited exceptions apply. Players may hold more than one non-FIFA nationality.

No.	Pos.	Nation	Player
1	GK	ALB	Dashamir Xhika
3	DF	ALB	Kristi Marku
4	DF	ALB	Esin Hakaj
5	DF	ALB	Gëzim Krasniqi
6	DF	ALB	Stivian Janku
7	FW	ALB	Realdo Fili
8	FW	ALB	Jurgen Vatnikaj
9	FW	NGR	Mathew Boniface
10	MF	ALB	Idriz Batha (vice-captain)
11	MF	ALB	Jurgen Bardhi
12	GK	ALB	Alban Hoxha (captain)
13	DF	ALB	Renato Malota
14	MF	ALB	Mentor Mazrekaj
16	MF	ALB	Ylber Ramadani

No.	Pos.	Nation	Player
19	MF	ALB	Lorenc Trashi
20	FW	ALB	Xhevahir Sukaj
21	MF	MNE	Marko Ćetković
22	DF	ALB	Labinot Ibrahimi
27	FW	ARG	Agustín Torassa
30	MF	ALB	Griseld Lika
31	DF	ALB	Arbnor Fejzullahu
36	DF	NGR	Sodiq Atanda
45	FW	GHA	Caleb Ekuban (on loan from Chievo)
88	MF	ALB	Emiljano Vila
91	FW	ALB	Ardit Jaupaj
95	MF	ALB	Lauren Ismailaj
96	GK	ALB	Mario Dajsinani
99	DF	ALB	Renaldo Kalari

=== Left club during season ===
Note: Flags indicate national team as defined under FIFA eligibility rules; some limited exceptions apply. Players may hold more than one non-FIFA nationality.

No.	Pos.	Nation	Player
44	DF	ALB	Fabio Hasa (to Teuta)
—	FW	ISR	Ben Azubel (to Hapoel Ashkelon)

== Competitions ==
=== Kategoria Superiore ===
==== League table ====
Pos	Team	Pld	W	D	L	GF	GA	GD	Pts	Qualification or relegation
1	Kukësi (C)	36	20	15	1	51	18	+33	75	Qualification for the Champions League second qualifying round
2	Partizani	36	19	15	2	46	17	+29	72 (Note: Partizani ahead of Skënderbeu on head-to-head record; Partizani–Skënderbeu 0–0, Skënderbeu–Partizani 1–2, Partizani–Skënderbeu 1–0, Skënderbeu–Partizani 2–2.)	Qualification for the Europa League first qualifying round
3	Skënderbeu	36	21	9	6	45	22	+23	72	Qualification for the Europa League first qualifying round
4	Luftëtari	36	11	11	14	37	45	−8	44	
5	Teuta	36	10	10	16	27	34	−7	40	

Source: Albanian Football Association (in Albanian), Soccerway
Rules for classification: 1) Points; 2) Head-to-head points; 3) Head-to-head goal difference; 4) Head-to-head goals scored; 5) Goal difference; 6) Goals scored; 7) Draw.
(C) Champions

==== Results summary ====
Overall								Home						Away					
Pld	W	D	L	GF	GA	GD	Pts	W	D	L	GF	GA	GD	W	D	L	GF	GA	GD
36	19	15	2	46	17	+29	72	12	6	0	27	5	+22	7	9	2	19	12	+7

Source: Competitive matches

==== Results by matchday ====
Round	1	2	3	4	5	6	7	8	9	10	11	12	13	14	15	16	17	18	19	20	21	22	23	24	25	26	27	28	29	30	31	32	33	34	35	36
Ground	H	H	A	H	A	A	H	A	H	A	A	H	A	H	H	A	H	A	A	H	A	H	A	A	H	A	H	A	A	H	A	H	H	A	H	A
Result	W	D	W	D	L	W	W	W	D	D	D	W	D	D	W	D	W	W	L	W	D	W	D	W	W	W	W	W	D	W	W	D	D	D	W	D
Position	1	1	1	1	1	1	1	1	2	2	2	2	2	2	2	2	2	2	2	2	2	2	2	2	2	2	2	2	2	2	2	2	2	2	2	2

Source: Competitive matches
A = Away; H = Home; W = Win; D = Draw; L = Loss

==== Matches ====
7 September 2016 1	Partizani Tirana	1–0	Luftëtari Gjirokastër	Elbasan
19:00 CEST	Atanda (yellow card) 36'; Trashi (yellow card) 44'; Batha 90+3' (pen.)	Report	Aleksi (yellow card) 23'; Beqiri (yellow card) 33'; Mersini (yellow card) 53'; Boyom (red card) 90+2'	Stadium: Elbasan Arena; Attendance: 1,000; Referee: Andi Koçi

12 September 2016 2	Partizani Tirana	0–0	Vllaznia Shkodër	Elbasan
19:00 CEST	Krasniqi (yellow card) 75'	Report	Krymi (yellow card) 43'; Shtubina (yellow card) 90+4'	Stadium: Elbasan Arena; Attendance: 700; Referee: Klajdi Kola

18 September 2016 3	Teuta Durrës	0–2	Partizani Tirana	Durrës
16:00 CEST	Hila (yellow card) 16'; Hodo (yellow card) 31'	Report	Bertoni (yellow card) 9'; Fili (yellow card) 16'; Atanda 34'; Ekuban 77'	Stadium: Niko Dovana Stadium; Attendance: 1,000; Referee: Emirjon Sino

25 September 2016 4	Partizani Tirana	0–0	Tirana	Elbasan
19:00 CEST	Bertoni (yellow card) 22'; Ekuban (yellow card) 25'; Batha (yellow card) 84'	Report	Taku (yellow card) 37'; Hoxhallari (yellow card) 61'; Karabeci (yellow card) 67'; Teqja (yellow card) 79'	Stadium: Elbasan Arena; Attendance: 5,000; Referee: Enea Jorgji

1 October 2016 5	Kukësi	1–0	Partizani Tirana	Kukës
14:00 CEST	Pashaj (yellow card) 35'; Pejić 47'; Lena (yellow card) 48'; Shameti (yellow card) 67'; Hasani (yellow card) 86'; Hallaçi (yellow card) 90'; Rangel (yellow card) 90+2'	Report	Ekuban (yellow card) 42'; Torassa (yellow card) 90'; Krasniqi (yellow card) 90+2'	Stadium: Zeqir Ymeri Stadium; Attendance: 2,000; Referee: Enea Jorgji

13 October 2016 6	Laçi	0–2	Partizani Tirana	Laç
14:00 CEST	Lushkja (yellow card) 11'; Shala (yellow card) 55'; Malindi (yellow card) 71'; Toski (yellow card) 80'	Report	Vila (yellow card) 10'; Ekuban 44', 64'	Stadium: Laçi Stadium; Attendance: 531; Referee: Lorenc Jemini

17 October 2016 7	Partizani Tirana	4–0	Flamurtari Vlorë	Elbasan
17:00 CEST	Ekuban 24'; Trashi 31'; Batha (yellow card) 42'; Vila 86'; Bardhi 89'	Report		Stadium: Elbasan Arena; Attendance: 400; Referee: Juxhin Xhaja

22 October 2016 8	Korabi Peshkopi	0–1	Partizani Tirana	Tirana
14:00 CEST	Zguro (yellow card) 28'; Zefi (yellow card) 28'; Veliaj (yellow card) 68'	Report	Ekuban 33'	Stadium: Selman Stërmasi Stadium; Attendance: 2,000; Referee: Remzi Sadiku

30 October 2016 9	Partizani Tirana	0–0	Skënderbeu Korçë	Tirana
17:00 CET	Batha (yellow card) 3'; Torassa (yellow card) 49'; Kalari (red card) 62'	Report	Orelesi (yellow card) 3'; Latifi (yellow card) 35'; Osmani (yellow card) 44'; Vangjeli (yellow card) 73' (red card) 82'; Nimaga (yellow card) 90+1'	Stadium: Selman Stërmasi Stadium; Attendance: 3,500; Referee: Enea Jorgji

5 November 2016 10	Luftëtari Gjirokastër	1–1	Partizani Tirana	Gjirokastër
14:00 CET	B. Ramadani (yellow card) 37'; Bregu 57' (yellow card) 57'; Liçaj (yellow card) 68' (yellow-red card)	Report	Bardhi (yellow card) 45'; Malota (yellow card) 50'; Ibrahimi 72'	Stadium: Gjirokastra Stadium; Attendance: 5,200; Referee: Kridens Meta

20 November 2016 11	Vllaznia Shkodër	1–1	Partizani Tirana	Shkodër
17:00 CET	Çinari 4'; Vrapi (yellow card) 88'	Report	Atanda (yellow card) 76'; Batha 79'	Stadium: Loro Boriçi Stadium; Attendance: 2,031; Referee: Lorenc Jemini

26 November 2016 12	Partizani Tirana	1–0	Teuta Durrës	Elbasan
17:00 CET	Ekuban 50'	Report	Shkalla (yellow card) 90+2'	Stadium: Elbasan Arena; Attendance: 0 (Note: The match was played behind the doors closed.); Referee: Emirjon Sino

2 December 2016 13	Tirana	0–0	Partizani Tirana	Tirana
14:00 CET	Teqja (yellow card) 39'; Karabeci (yellow card) 75' (yellow-red card) 88'	Report	Krasniqi (yellow card) 80'	Stadium: Selman Stërmasi Stadium; Attendance: 7,531; Referee: Lorenc Jemini

6 December 2016 14	Partizani Tirana	0–0	Kukësi	Elbasan
17:00 CET	Kalari (yellow card) 89'	Report	Alla (yellow card) 43'; Lena (yellow card) 76'	Stadium: Elbasan Arena; Attendance: 2,031; Referee: Lorenc Jemini

10 December 2016 15	Partizani Tirana	2–0	Laçi	Elbasan
17:00 CET	Ekuban 20'; Torassa 62'	Report		Stadium: Elbasan Arena; Attendance: 300; Referee: Emirjon Sino

14 December 2016 16	Flamurtari Vlorë	1–1	Partizani Tirana	Vlorë
17:00 CET	Danilo Alves 65'; Frashëri (yellow card) 72'; Telushi (yellow card) 90+3'	Report	Batha 13'; Trashi (yellow card) 76'; Y. Ramadani (yellow card) 87'	Stadium: Flamurtari Stadium; Attendance: 2,500; Referee: Andi Koçi

18 December 2016 17	Partizani Tirana	1–0	Korabi Peshkopi	Elbasan
17:00 CET	Azubel 39'; Krasniqi (yellow card) 51'; Y. Ramadani (yellow card) 90+2'	Report	Jubani (yellow card) 45'; Gavazaj (yellow card) 90'	Stadium: Elbasan Arena; Attendance: 250; Referee: Remzi Sadiku

22 December 2016 18	Skënderbeu Korçë	1–2	Partizani Tirana	Korçë
17:00 CET	James 10'	Report	Trashi (yellow card) 15'; Ekuban 34', 57' (yellow card) 67'	Stadium: Skënderbeu Stadium; Attendance: 4,300; Referee: Kridens Meta

28 January 2017 19	Luftëtari Gjirokastër	2–0	Partizani Tirana	Gjirokastër
14:00 CET	Zguro (yellow card) 23'; B. Ramadani 44' (pen.); Abazaj 65'; Reginaldo (yellow card) 75'; Rapa (yellow card) 87'	Report	Kalari (yellow card) 29'; Atanda (yellow card) 44'; Krasniqi (yellow card) 75'	Stadium: Gjirokastra Stadium; Attendance: 0 (Note: The match was played behind the doors closed.); Referee: Juxhin Xhaja

5 February 2017 20	Partizani Tirana	2–1	Vllaznia Shkodër	Tirana
17:00 CET	Bardhi 65'; Batha 89' (pen.)	Report	El. Bakaj 35'; Bardulla (yellow card) 39'; Selimaj (yellow card) 55'; Bicaj (yellow card) 88'	Stadium: Selman Stërmasi Stadium; Attendance: 3,000; Referee: Enea Jorgji

10 February 2017 21	Teuta Durrës	0–0	Partizani Tirana	Durrës
18:00 CET	Progni (yellow card) 23'; Marković (yellow card) 37'	Report	Vila (yellow card) 25'; Atanda (yellow card) 30'; Trashi (yellow card) 90+4'	Stadium: Niko Dovana Stadium; Attendance: 2,000; Referee: Emirjon Sino

20 February 2017 22	Partizani Tirana	2–1	Tirana	Tirana
18:00 CET	Malota 13'; Ekuban 70'; Ćetković (yellow card) 90+2'	Report	Hoxhallari (yellow card) 38'; Teqja 47'; Daja (yellow card) 58'	Stadium: Selman Stërmasi Stadium; Attendance: 3,500; Referee: Kridens Meta

26 February 2017 23	Kukësi	0–0	Partizani Tirana	Kukës
14:00 CET	Hasani (yellow card) 31'; Rrumbullaku (yellow card) 46'; Shameti (yellow card) 52'; Alla (yellow card) 57'	Report	Batha (yellow card) 44'	Stadium: Zeqir Ymeri Stadium; Attendance: 4,500; Referee: Andi Koçi

5 March 2017 24	Laçi	0–1	Partizani Tirana	Laç
14:00 CET	Jonuzi (yellow card) 68'	Report	Krasniqi 67'; Trashi (yellow card) 90+2'	Stadium: Laçi Stadium; Attendance: 0 (Note: The match was played behind the doors closed.); Referee: Kridens Meta

11 March 2017 25	Partizani Tirana	2–1	Flamurtari Vlorë	Elbasan
14:00 CET	Mazrekaj 5'; Trashi 11' (pen.); Ćetković (yellow card) 48'; Atanda (yellow card) 89'	Report	Danilo Alves 70'	Stadium: Elbasan Arena; Attendance: 0 (Note: The match was played behind the doors closed.); Referee: Andi Koçi

18 March 2017 26	Korabi Peshkopi	0–2	Partizani Tirana	Tirana
14:00 CET	Mziu (yellow card) 35'; Shabani (yellow card) 45'; Zefi (yellow card) 66'	Report	Prençi 32' (o.g.); Ekuban 33' (yellow card) 83'; Sukaj (yellow card) 90+2'	Stadium: Selman Stërmasi Stadium; Attendance: 500; Referee: Laver Alla

2 April 2017 27	Partizani Tirana	1–0	Skënderbeu Korçë	Tirana
19:00 CEST	Trashi (yellow card) 32'; Batha 39'; Torassa (yellow card) 78'	Report	Radaš (yellow card) 22'; Mici (yellow card) 23'; Orelesi (yellow card) 40'; Vangjeli (yellow card) 87'	Stadium: Selman Stërmasi Stadium; Attendance: 5,000; Referee: Andi Koçi

8 April 2017 28	Partizani Tirana	2–0	Luftëtari Gjirokastër	Elbasan
19:00 CEST	Batha 5' (pen.); Y. Ramadani (yellow card) 20'; Ekuban 43'; Kalari (yellow card) 68'	Report	Mutumane (yellow card) 35' (yellow-red card) 40'	Stadium: Elbasan Arena; Attendance: 2,031; Referee: Lorenc Jemini

16 April 2017 29	Vllaznia Shkodër	1–1	Partizani Tirana	Shkodër
19:00 CEST	Bicaj (yellow card) 31'; Hebaj 77'; Shtubina (yellow card) 78'; Gocaj (yellow card) 80'	Report	Fejzullahu (yellow card) 36'; Vila (yellow card) 76'; Ekuban 80'	Stadium: Loro Boriçi Stadium; Attendance: 2,500; Referee: Kridens Meta

23 April 2017 30	Partizani Tirana	5–1	Teuta Durrës	Tirana
19:00 CEST	Torassa 19', 30'; Ekuban 71', 73'; Sukaj 90+3' (pen.)	Report	Marković (yellow card) 26'; Çyrbja 62'; Moçka (yellow card) 64'; Borshi (yellow card) 90+3'	Stadium: Selman Stërmasi Stadium; Attendance: 1,800; Referee: Remzi Sadiku

28 April 2017 31	Tirana	1–2	Partizani Tirana	Tirana
19:00 CEST	Edeh 14'; Daja (yellow card) 28'; Ed. Bakaj (red card) 87'	Report	Batha 45' (pen.) (yellow card) 89'; Kalari (yellow card) 45'; Ekuban (yellow card) 69'; Krasniqi (yellow card) 72'; Mazrekaj (yellow card) 80'; Sukaj 87'; Ibrahimi (red card) 87'	Stadium: Selman Stërmasi Stadium; Attendance: 5,000; Referee: Juxhin Xhaja

5 May 2017 32	Partizani Tirana	1–1	Kukësi	Tirana
19:00 CEST	Vila (yellow card) 12'; Torassa (yellow card) 17'; Shameti 46' (o.g.); Malota (yellow card) 50'; Ćetković (yellow card) 73'	Report	Dvorneković 21'; Alla (yellow card) 36'; Shameti (yellow card) 44'	Stadium: Selman Stërmasi Stadium; Attendance: 7,000; Referee: Matej Jug (Slovenia)

11 May 2017 33	Partizani Tirana	0–0	Laçi	Tirana
17:00 CEST	Batha (yellow card) 9'; Y. Ramadani (yellow card) 79'	Report	Sefgjinaj (yellow card) 23'; Mensah (yellow card) 65'; Gjoni (yellow card) 81'; Nika (yellow card) 86'; Fangaj (yellow card) 90+5'; Selmani (yellow card) 90+5'	Stadium: Selman Stërmasi Stadium; Attendance: 1,800; Referee: Remzi Sadiku

15 May 2017 34	Flamurtari Vlorë	1–1	Partizani Tirana	Vlorë
19:00 CEST	Telushi 49' (pen.) (yellow card) 61'; Danilo Alves (yellow card) 66'	Report	Ekuban 33'; Trashi (yellow card) 39'; Malota (yellow card) 48'; Y. Ramadani (yellow card) 77'	Stadium: Flamurtari Stadium; Attendance: 3,500; Referee: Blerim Ziri

21 May 2017 35	Partizani Tirana	3–0	Korabi Peshkopi	Tirana
17:30 CEST	Ćetković 20'; Ekuban 25'; Krasniqi 62'	Report	Arifaj (yellow card) 61'	Stadium: Selman Stërmasi Stadium; Attendance: 1,000; Referee: Ardian Beqiri

27 May 2017 36	Skënderbeu Korçë	2–2	Partizani Tirana	Korçë
17:00 CEST	Vangjeli (yellow card) 66'; Plaku 70'; Gripshi 89'	Report	Batha 3'; Kalari 64'; Torassa (yellow card) 89'	Stadium: Skënderbeu Stadium; Attendance: 1,000; Referee: Juxhin Xhaja

=== Albanian Cup ===
==== First round ====
28 September 2016 First leg	Kevitan	1–5	Partizani Tirana	Pezë Helmës
16:00 CEST	Toska 16'	Report	Jaupaj 15'; Bardhi 18'; Vatnikaj 20'; Ramadani (yellow card) 44'; Azubel 58', 69'; Fili (yellow card) 70'	Stadium: Internacional Complex; Attendance: 30; Referee: Erjon Bastari

6 October 2016 Second leg	Partizani Tirana	4–0 (9–1 agg.)	Kevitan	Pezë Helmës
14:00 CEST	Batha 43'; Ekuban 80'; Azubel 81', 83'	Report	Dule (yellow card) 43'	Stadium: Internacional Complex; Attendance: 100; Referee: Kreshnik Barjamaj

==== Second round ====
26 October 2016 First leg	Besëlidhja Lezhë	1–0	Partizani Tirana	Lezhë
14:00 CEST	Goxha 57'	Report	Vatnikaj (yellow card) 30'; Hasa (yellow card) 39'	Stadium: Brian Filipi Stadium; Attendance: 500; Referee: Blendi Breshani

16 November 2016 Second leg	Partizani Tirana	1–1 (1–2 agg.)	Besëlidhja Lezhë	Elbasan
13:30 CET	Vila 45+1'	Report	Diop (yellow card) 15'; Sidibe 56'; Demi (yellow card) 90+1'	Stadium: Elbasan Arena; Attendance: 200; Referee: Remzi Sadiku

=== UEFA Champions League ===
==== Second qualifying round ====
13 July 2016 First leg	Partizani Tirana (Albania)	1–1	(Hungary) Ferencváros	Elbasan, Albania
20:00 CEST	Fili 47'	Report	Nalepa (yellow card) 23'; Dilaver (yellow card) 54'; Ramírez (yellow card) 64'; Böde 71'	Stadium: Elbasan Arena; Attendance: 1,700; Referee: Benoît Millot (France)

20 July 2016 Second leg	Ferencváros (Hungary)	1–1 (a.e.t.) (2–2 agg.) (1–3 p)	(Albania) Partizani Tirana	Budapest, Hungary
19:30 CEST	Gera 14' (pen.) (yellow card) 53'; Böde (yellow card) 23'; Ramírez (yellow card) 51'; Dilaver (yellow card) 102'	Report	Krasniqi (yellow card) 13'; Torassa (yellow card) 35'; Hüsing 41' (o.g.); Atanda (yellow card) 74'	Stadium: Groupama Arena; Attendance: 8,752; Referee: Kristo Tohver (Estonia)
	Penalties
	Gera (penalty missed); Šesták (penalty missed); Nagy (penalty scored); Ramírez (penalty missed)		(penalty scored) Hoxha; (penalty missed) Vila; (penalty scored) Trashi; (penalty scored) Ekuban

==== Third qualifying round ====
26 July 2016 First leg	Partizani Tirana (Albania)	0–1	(Austria) Red Bull Salzburg	Elbasan, Albania
20:15 CEST	Ibrahimi (yellow card) 52'; Kalari (red card) 72'	Report	Schwegler (yellow card) 45'; Samassékou (yellow card) 50' (yellow-red card); Soriano 70' (pen.); V. Berisha (yellow card) 84'	Stadium: Elbasan Arena; Attendance: 4,000; Referee: Michael Oliver (England)

3 August 2016 Second leg	Red Bull Salzburg (Austria)	2–0 (3–0 agg.)	(Albania) Partizani Tirana	Wals-Siezenheim, Austria
20:30 CEST	Lazaro (yellow card) 45+1'; Soriano 76'; Wanderson 81'	Report	Vila (yellow card) 51'	Stadium: Red Bull Arena; Attendance: 7,853; Referee: Ivan Kružliak (Slovakia)

=== UEFA Europa League ===
==== Play-off round ====
18 August 2016 First leg	Krasnodar (Russia)	4–0	(Albania) Partizani Tirana	Krasnodar, Russia
19:30 FET	Joãozinho 18' (pen.); Jędrzejczyk (yellow card) 23' (goal) 45'; Smolov 27'; Granqvist (yellow card) 38'; Krasniqi 73' (o.g.)	Report	Ramadani (yellow card) 60'	Stadium: Kuban Stadium; Attendance: 11,575; Referee: Gediminas Mažeika (Lithuania)

25 August 2016 Second leg	Partizani Tirana (Albania)	0–0 (0–4 agg.)	(Russia) Krasnodar	Elbasan, Albania
19:30 CEST		Report	Pereyra (yellow card) 30'; Torbinski (yellow card) 45'; Eboue (yellow card) 51'; Vorobyev (yellow card) 67'	Stadium: Elbasan Arena; Attendance: 1,550; Referee: Jakob Kehlet (Denmark)
