= Rudović =

Rudović is a surname. Notable people with the surname include:

- Andjelo Rudović (born 1996), Montenegrin footballer
- Ronaldo Rudović (born 1996), Montenegrin footballer
