= Albania national under-15 football team =

National association football team

Albania Under-15
- Nickname(s): Kuq e Zinjtë (The Red and Blacks); Shqiponjat (The Eagles)
- Association: Federata Shqiptare e Futbollit – FSHF (Albanian Football Association)
- Confederation: UEFA
- Head coach: Armand Dama
- Captain: Endri Çelaj
- Most caps: Jurgen Vatnikaj
- Top scorer: Haxhi Rrena (10)
- Home stadium: Elbasan Arena; Loro Boriçi Stadium
- FIFA code: ALB
| First colours | Second colours | Third colours |

First international
- Albania 2–0 Liechtenstein (venue unknown; 17 October 2009)

Biggest win
- Albania 2–0 Liechtenstein (venue unknown; 17 October 2009)

Biggest defeat
- Albania 1–2 Montenegro (USB Arena, Nyon; 19 October 2009)

The Albania national under-15 football team is the national under-15 football team of Albania and is controlled by the Football Association of Albania. It was founded in 2009.

== History ==
The Albania under-15 were founded in 2009 for participating in the 2010 Summer Youth Olympics (Football) and the head coach was appointed Sulejman Demollari, former and last native coach of Albania senior side until 2002. Albania under-15 played their first match against Liechtenstein in the semi-final qualification round on 17 October 2009 winning 2–0 with goals scored by Jurgen Vatnikaj and Enes Hoxha. Albania under-15 advanced to the final where they faced Montenegro on 19 October 2009. However, they lost 1–2, missing their participation in the 2010 Summer Youth Olympics finals.

=== 2010 Summer Youth Olympics (Football) qualification round ===
| 17 October 2009 2010 Summer Youth Olympics (Football) qualification | Albania | 2–0 | Liechtenstein |
| 15:00 (UTC+2) | Vatnikaj 46'; E.Hoxha | Report |

| 19 October 2009 2010 Summer Youth Olympics (Football) qualification | Albania | 1–2 | Montenegro | Nyon, Switzerland |
| 17:00 (UTC+2) | Ymeralilaj 68' | Report | | Stadium: USB Arena; Referee: Artyom Kuchin (Kazakhstan) |

==== Squad ====
COACH: (Albania) Sulejman Demollari

The following players participated in the 2010 Summer Youth Olympics (Football) qualification round.

| No. | Pos. | Player | Date of birth (age) | Caps | Goals | Club |
|---|---|---|---|---|---|---|
| 1 | GK | Aldo Teqja | 4 May 1995 (aged 14) | 2 | 0 | (Albanian Football Federation) Dinamo Tirana |
| 12 | GK | Arlindo Pllumbi | 16 April 1995 (aged 14) | 0 | 0 | (Albanian Football Federation) Teuta Durrës |
| | DF | Erion Hoxhallari | 15 October 1995 (aged 14) | 2 | 0 | (Albanian Football Federation) Tirana |
| | DF | Kristi Marku | 13 April 1995 (aged 14) | 2 | 0 | (Albanian Football Federation) Teuta Durrës |
| | DF | Adelaid Thaci | 27 January 1995 (aged 14) | 2 | 0 | (Albanian Football Federation) Shkëndija Tiranë |
| | DF | Klaudio Çema | 22 April 1995 (aged 14) | 0 | 0 | (Albanian Football Federation) Partizani Tirana |
| 6 | MF | Enes Hoxha | 26 February 1995 (aged 14) | 2 | 1 | (Italian Football Federation) Udinese |
| | MF | Stelios Nitsios | 25 January 2002 (aged 7) | 2 | 0 | (Hellenic Football Federation) Agrotikos Asteras |
| | MF | Mikelanxhelo Bardhi | 8 January 1995 (aged 14) | 2 | 0 | (Albanian Football Federation) Iliria |
| | MF | Klodian Nuri | 23 July 1995 (aged 14) | 2 | 0 | (Albanian Football Federation) Shkëndija Tiranë |
| | MF | Frenki Milori | 6 October 1995 (aged 14) | 1 | 0 | (Albanian Football Federation) Olimpic |
| | MF | Uliks Tirana | 21 December 1995 (aged 13) | 1 | 0 | (Albanian Football Federation) Shkëndija Tiranë |
| | MF | Senad Sallaku | 8 October 1995 (aged 14) | 0 | 0 | (Albanian Football Federation) Partizani Tirana |
| | MF | Xhuljo Tabaku | 3 June 1995 (aged 14) | 0 | 0 | (Albanian Football Federation) Olimpic |
| 8 | FW | Jurgen Vatnikaj | 8 August 1995 (aged 14) | 2 | 1 | (Albanian Football Federation) Partizani Tirana |
| | FW | Franc Ymeralilaj | 14 January 1995 (aged 14) | 2 | 1 | (Hellenic Football Federation) Rodos |
| | FW | Aleksandro Cakalli | 27 August 1995 (aged 14) | 2 | 0 | (Albanian Football Federation) Olimpic |
| | FW | Arlind Kalaja | 27 December 1995 (aged 13) | 1 | 0 | (Albanian Football Federation) Vllaznia Shkodër |
| | FW | Leonard Culi | 4 March 1995 (aged 14) | 1 | 0 | (Albanian Football Federation) Tirana |

=== Refoundation ===
On 25 July 2016 the Albanian Football Association announced to have planned a "reborn" of the Albania under-15 starting with several selection in August, principally for youth talents in Italy on 11 & 12 August and in Greece on 13 August. On 28 September 2016 Albania U-15 had a gathering in the national team training center Kamëz, Tirana, Albania for two days. Alessandro Recenti coach, had accumulated nearly 35 players who were selected from collections made in Greece and Albania. Following the departure of Alessandro Recenti, on 27 January 2017 Albanian Football Association appointed Eqerem Memushi as the under-15 head coach to take the vacant place. Following a 3-months selection in some zones around Albania, on 28 April 2017 an under-15 squad was contoured with 20 players which participated in a 5 days gathering between 9–13 May 2017. A week after, the under-15 team started another gathering in Durrës, Albania between dates 17–19 May 2017 with a squad which contained 21 players. They made their first gathering to play their first matches since refoundation in September 2017 for the double friendly matches against Montenegro U15 on 28 & 30 September 2017. They lost the first match at Reshit Rusi Stadium, Shkodër, Albania 0–4.

== Results and fixtures ==
| 24 October 2026 2027 U15 FIFA WC | Albania | v | Turks and Caicos Islands | Hövsan |
| | | | | Stadium: Hövsan Competition Complex |

| 25 October 2026 2027 U15 FIFA WC | Albania | v | Mauritania | Hövsan |
| | | | | Stadium: Hövsan Competition Complex |

| 25 October 2026 2027 U15 FIFA WC | Albania | v | Rwanda | Hövsan |
| | | | | Stadium: Hövsan Competition Complex |

| 26 October 2026 2027 U15 FIFA WC | Vanuatu | v | Albania | Hövsan |
| | | | | Stadium: Hövsan Competition Complex |

| 26 October 2026 2027 U15 FIFA WC | Ivory Coast | v | Albania | Hövsan |
| | | | | Stadium: Hövsan Competition Complex |

== Players ==
=== Current squad ===
COACH: (Albania) Armand Dama

The following players participated in the 2026 FIFA U-15 World Cup & Festival.

| No. | Pos. | Player | Date of birth (age) | Caps | Goals | Club |
|---|---|---|---|---|---|---|
| | GK | Besardo Ndoj | 7 June 2011 (aged 15) | 4 | 0 | (Albanian Football Federation) Vllaznia Shkodër U17 |
| | GK | Valerio Alijaj | 9 June 2011 (aged 15) | 1 | 0 | (German Football Association) Fortuna Düsseldorf U16 |
| | DF | Denian Avdylaj | 25 January 2011 (aged 15) | 7 | 1 | (Albanian Football Federation) Partizani Tirana U17 |
| | DF | Elez Elqeni | 22 January 2011 (aged 15) | 7 | 0 | (Albanian Football Federation) Partizani Tirana U17 |
| | DF | Romeo Hazizaj | 8 March 2011 (aged 15) | 7 | 0 | (Albanian Football Federation) Apollo 2016 U17 |
| | DF | Kevin Muharremi | 12 April 2011 (aged 15) | 5 | 1 | (Italian Football Federation) Empoli U16 |
| | DF | Elio Mera | 11 March 2011 (aged 15) | 1 | 0 | (Albanian Football Federation) Shënkolli U17 |
| | MF | Matias Mehmeti | 7 February 2011 (aged 15) | 7 | 1 | (Albanian Football Federation) Dinamo City U17 |
| | MF | Gean Ramadani | 8 June 2011 (aged 15) | 7 | 0 | (Albanian Football Federation) Dinamo City U17 |
| | MF | Kledi Dida | 1 January 2011 (aged 15) | 5 | 2 | (The Football Association) Wolverhampton Wanderers U16 |
| | MF | Lionel Cjapi | 13 November 2011 (aged 14) | 0 | 0 | (Albanian Football Federation) Dinamo City U17 |
| | FW | Santjago Përkola | 15 August 2011 (aged 15) | 7 | 1 | (Albanian Football Federation) Shënkolli U17 |
| | FW | Aleksandros Shofiti | 8 February 2011 (aged 15) | 4 | 1 | (Albanian Football Federation) Tirana U17 |
| | FW | Dejvis Mesiti | 15 July 2011 (aged 15) | 2 | 0 | (Albanian Football Federation) Teuta Durrës U17 |

=== Coaching staff ===
Current coaching staff:

| Position | Name |
|---|---|
| Head coach | (Albania) Armand Dama |
| Assistant coach | (Albania) Ardi Bozhani |
| Goalkeeping coach | (Albania) Adrian Balla |
| Team doctor | (Albania) Besmir Bulku |
| Physiotherapists | (Albania) Mishel Topalli |

== Competitive record ==
=== Youth Olympic Games ===
| Youth Olympic Games | | | | | | | | Qualification | | | | | | |
| Year | Round | Pld | W | D * | L | GF | GA | Position | Pld | W | D * | L | GF | GA |
|---|---|---|---|---|---|---|---|---|---|---|---|---|---|---|
| 2010 | did not qualify | | | | | | | Qualifying stage 2/4 | 2 | 1 | 0 | 1 | 3 | 2 |
| Total: 0/1 | Best:- | 0 | 0 | 0 | 0 | 0 | 0 | Total | 2 | 1 | 0 | 1 | 3 | 2 |

*Denotes draws include knockout matches decided on penalty kicks.

== See also ==
- Albania national football team
- Albania national under-23 football team
- Albania national under-21 football team
- Albania national under-20 football team
- Albania national under-19 football team
- Albania national under-18 football team
- Albania national under-17 football team
- Albania national under-16 football team
- Albania national youth football team
- Albania national football team results
- Albanian Superliga
- Football in Albania
- List of Albania international footballers
