= Luca Bertoni =

Italian professional footballer

Personal information
- Date of birth: 19 June 1992 (age 34)
- Place of birth: Vizzolo Predabissi, Italy
- Height: 1.76 m (5 ft 9 in)
- Position: Midfielder

Team information
- Current team: Nuova Sondrio
- Number: 8

Youth career
- 2010–2012: Milan

Senior career*
Years	Team	Apps	(Gls)
2012–2013	Milan	0	(0)
2012–2013	→ Südtirol (loan)	20	(0)
2013–2014	Carpi	6	(0)
2014–2018	Südtirol	90	(2)
2016	→ Partizani Tirana (loan)	4	(0)
2018–2024	Pro Patria	159	(6)
2024–2025	Alcione	11	(0)
2026–	Nuova Sondrio	2	(0)
- * Club domestic league appearances and goals as of 22 February 2026

Luca Bertoni (born 19 June 1992) is an Italian professional footballer who plays as a midfielder for Serie D club Nuova Sondrio.

== Club career ==
Bertoni started his football career at Milan, playing in their youth team. On 11 July 2012, after finishing his youth formation with Milan, he joined Südtirol in a season-long loan, and made his senior debuts with the Prima Divisione side.

On 12 July 2013, Bertoni moved to Serie B side Carpi in a co-ownership deal with Milan. He made his division debut on 24 August, starting in a 0–1 loss at Ternana.

He returned in 2014 to the previous team Südtirol, in the Lega Pro.

On 18 July 2016, Bertoni completed a loan move to Albanian Superliga side Partizani Tirana. The club also had the option to make the move permanent at the end of the season. He was handed squad number 70, and made his competitive debut on 3 August in the returning leg of Champions League third qualifying round against Red Bull Salzburg, playing in the last two minutes in an eventual 2–0 away defeat (3–0 on aggregate). Bertoni made his first Albanian Superliga appearance in the opening league match on 7 September against Luftëtari, playing full-90 minutes in a 1–0 win. Following the dismissal of Adolfo Sormani, Bertoni did not play in October, and on 25th, he terminated his contract with the club by mutual consent.

On 3 July 2018, Bertoni signed for Italian club Pro Patria in an undisclosed fee.
