= Arlind Kalaja =

Albanian footballer

Personal information
- Full name: Arlind Kalaja
- Date of birth: 27 December 1995 (age 30)
- Place of birth: Shkodër, Albania
- Height: 1.76 m (5 ft 9 in)
- Position: Winger

Team information
- Current team: Ljungskile
- Number: 7

Youth career
- –2014: Vllaznia

Senior career*
Years	Team	Apps	(Gls)
2014–2018	Vllaznia	118	(12)
2018–2019	Kukësi	15	(0)
2019	→ Kastrioti (loan)	12	(0)
2019–2020	Teuta	18	(3)
2020–2022	Vllaznia	29	(1)
2022–2023	Ljungskile	25	(0)
2023	Panelefsiniakos		
2023–2024	Fostiras	13	(1)
2024–	Panionios	0	(0)

International career
2009	Albania U15	1	(0)
2011–2012	Albania U17	5	(0)
2013	Albania U19	5	(1)
- * Club domestic league appearances and goals as of 30 December 2023

Arlind Kalaja (born 27 December 1995) is an Albanian professional footballer who plays as a winger for Swedish club Ljungskile in the Ettan.

== Club career ==
=== Vllaznia Shkodër ===
Kalaja was promoted to Vllaznia's senior squad during the 2012–13 season, making his professional debut on 27 April 2013 by playing in the second half of the match lost at the hands of Besa Kavajë.

Later in the next season, Kalaja did not play any match, featuring only once as an unused substitute in the 1–1 draw versus Tirana at Qemal Stafa Stadium.

In March 2015, Kalaja underwent surgery on his anterior cruciate ligament (ACL) by doctor Fausto Zanelli. He remained sidelined for the next five months, only returning in action at the end of September, playing as substitute in the 1–0 home loss to Laçi in the 2015–16 Albanian Superliga matchday 5.

On 26 July 2017, Kalaja agreed another contract extension, signing for the upcoming season.

In the 2017–18 season, he made 30 league appearances, starting only 7, collecting 973 minutes, scoring 4 goals as Vllaznia was relegated for the first time in 60 years. He went on saying that he was "persecuted" within the group, adding that he was left aside and was not given regular playing time.

On 3 June 2018, Kalaja announced his departure from the club once his contract expired, finishing his spell with more than 100 appearances in all competitions.

=== Kukësi ===
On 6 June 2018, Kalaja agreed personal terms and completed a transfer to Kukësi, penning a contract until June 2020.

On 31 January 2019, on deadline day, Kalaja was loaned to Kastrioti Krujë until the end of 2018–19 season.

=== Teuta Durrës ===
Ahead of the 2019/20 season, Kalaja joined KF Teuta Durrës on a two-year deal.

== International career ==
Kalaja has been a former Albania youth international, representing his country at under-15, -17 and -19 level.

== Career statistics ==
As of 9 February 2019

Club statistics
Club	Season	League			Cup		Europe		Other		Total	
Club	Season	Division	Apps	Goals	Apps	Goals	Apps	Goals	Apps	Goals	Apps	Goals
Vllaznia Shkodër	2012–13	Albanian Superliga	1	0	1	0	—		—		2	0
Vllaznia Shkodër	2013–14	Albanian Superliga	0	0	0	0	—		—		0	0
Vllaznia Shkodër	2014–15	Albanian Superliga	20	2	6	0	—		—		26	2
Vllaznia Shkodër	2015–16	Albanian Superliga	29	4	4	1	—		—		33	5
Vllaznia Shkodër	2016–17	Albanian Superliga	23	0	4	0	—		—		27	0
Vllaznia Shkodër	2017–18	Albanian Superliga	30	4	4	1	—		—		34	5
Vllaznia Shkodër	Total		103	10	19	2	—		—		122	12
Vllaznia Shkodër B	2017–18	Albanian First Division	0	0	0	0	—		1 (Note: All appearance(s) in Albanian First Division play-out)	0	1	0
Kukësi	2018–19	Albanian Superliga	12	0	3	0	0	0	—		15	0
Kastrioti Krujë (loan)	2018–19	Albanian Superliga	2	0	0	0	—		—		2	0
Career total			117	10	23	2	0	0	0	0	140	12
