= Martín Dedyn =

Argentine footballer

Personal information
- Full name: Martín Dedyn
- Date of birth: 18 June 1988 (age 38)
- Place of birth: Buenos Aires, Argentina
- Height: 1.74 m (5 ft 9 in)
- Position: Central midfielder

Youth career
- –2008: CAI

Senior career*
Years	Team	Apps	(Gls)
2008–2012	CAI	60	(1)
2012–2015	Guillermo Brown	62	(0)
2016	Tërbuni	17	(0)
- * Club domestic league appearances and goals

Martín Dedyn (born 7 May 1988) is an Argentine footballer who played in the Primera B Nacional.
