= Denis Pjeshka =

Albanian footballer

Personal information
- Date of birth: 28 May 1995 (age 31)
- Place of birth: Shkodër, Albania
- Height: 1.82 m (6 ft 0 in)
- Position: Defender

Team information
- Current team: Flamurtari
- Number: 5

Youth career
- 2010–2014: Vllaznia

Senior career*
Years	Team	Apps	(Gls)
2013–2018	Vllaznia	77	(2)
2018–2019	Laçi	1	(0)
2019–2020	Flamurtari	26	(2)
2020–2021	Teuta	5	(0)
2021–	Flamurtari	89	(11)
- * Club domestic league appearances and goals as of 13 May 2026

Denis Pjeshka (born 28 May 1995) is an Albanian football player who plays as a defender for Albanian club Flamurtari.

== Club career ==
In the summer of 2014 he had a four-day trial with Italian Lega Pro side Catanzaro, but returned to Vllaznia for the 2014–15 season. In summer 2019, he joined Flamurtari from Laçi.
