= Dritmir Beci =

Albanian professional footballer

Personal information
- Date of birth: 9 June 1996 (age 30)
- Place of birth: Shkodër, Albania
- Height: 1.81 m (5 ft 11 1/2 in)
- Position: Defender

Team information
- Current team: Vllaznia
- Number: 5

Youth career
- –2012: Vllaznia

Senior career*
Years	Team	Apps	(Gls)
2015	Vllaznia	0	(0)
2015	→ Tërbuni (loan)	14	(0)
2016–2018	Tërbuni	46	(3)
2018–2019	Tomori	18	(1)
2019–2021	Burreli	32	(4)
2021–2022	Erzeni	24	(2)
2022–2023	Skënderbeu	5	(0)
2023–	Vllaznia	9	(0)
- * Club domestic league appearances and goals as of 1 June 2024

Dritmir Beci (born 9 June 1996) is an Albanian professional footballer who plays for Vllaznia in the Kategoria Superiore as a defender.

== Club career ==
He was promoted to the Vllaznia Shkodër first team ahead of the 2015–16 campaign, before joining Tërbuni Pukë on loan in January 2016.
