= Gëzim Krasniqi =

Albanian footballer

Personal information
- Date of birth: 5 January 1990 (age 36)
- Place of birth: Kavajë, Albania
- Height: 1.95 m (6 ft 5 in)
- Position: Centre-back

Team information
- Current team: Vushtrria
- Number: 5

Youth career
- 2002–2008: Besa Kavajë

Senior career*
Years	Team	Apps	(Gls)
2008–2013	Besa Kavajë	64	(2)
2013–2014	Partizani	24	(0)
2014–2015	Flamurtari	18	(0)
2015–2017	Partizani	65	(4)
2017–2018	Rabotnički	10	(0)
2018–2020	Kukësi	24	(0)
2020–2022	Egnatia	50	(4)
2022–2023	Erzeni	23	(0)
2023–2024	Bylis	18	(1)
2024–2025	Kastrioti	12	(0)
2025–	Vushtrria	0	(0)
- * Club domestic league appearances and goals as of 21 January 2025

Gëzim Krasniqi (born 5 January 1990) is an Albanian professional footballer who plays as a defender for Vushtrria.

== Club career ==
He previously played for Partizani Tirana in the Albanian Superliga.

On 12 January 2018, Krasniqi moved for the first time abroad and signed with Macedonian First Football League side Rabotnički. He was presented four days later along with three other players, penning a contract until the end of the season. Krasniqi's spell was short-lived, as he was released in May 2018 after collecting 10 league appearances.

On 22 August 2018, Krasniqi signed a one-year contract with Kukësi.

== Honours ==
Besa Kavajë

- Albanian Cup: 2009–10
- Albanian Supercup: 2010
