= Federico Haberkorn =

Argentine footballer (born 1994)

Personal information
- Full name: Federico Nicolás Haberkorn
- Date of birth: 18 August 1994 (age 32)
- Place of birth: Merlo (Buenos Aires), Argentina
- Height: 1.90 m (6 ft 3 in)
- Position: Forward

Team information
- Current team: Isidro Metapan
- Number: 9

Youth career
- Vélez Sarsfield

Senior career*
| Years | Team | Apps | (Gls) |
| 2014 | Vélez Sarsfield | ? | (?) |
| 2014–2015 | → Gimnasia de Jujuy (loan) | 26 | (4) |
| 2015–2016 | → Tapachula (loan) | 8 | (0) |
| 2016–2017 | → Shkëndija (loan) | 7 | (0) |
| 2017-2018 | Eldense | 0 | (0) |
| 2018-2019 | San Telmo | 13 | (1) |
| 2019-2020 | Gualaceo | 31 | (8) |
| 2021 | Atletico Santo Domingo | 30 | (9) |
| 2022 | Villa Dalmine | 30 | (4) |
| 2023 | Los Andes | 17 | (2) |
| 2024 | Laferrere | 23 | (3) |
| 2024-2025 | CASD Camioneros | 6 | (1) |
| 2025 | San Martin de Fermosa | 13 | (0) |
| 2026 | Excursionistas | 4 | (0) |
| 2026- | Isidro Metapan | 4 | (5) |
- * Club domestic league appearances and goals as of 9 August 2026

Federico Nicolás Haberkorn (born August 18, 1994) is an Argentine professional footballer who plays for FK Shkëndija of Macedonian First Football League.
