= Filipe (footballer, born 1987) =

Brazilian footballer

Personal information
- Full name: Filipe Gomes Ribeiro
- Date of birth: 28 May 1987 (age 39)
- Place of birth: Rio de Janeiro, Brazil
- Height: 1.80 m (5 ft 11 in)
- Position: Midfielder

Team information
- Current team: FK Partizani Tirana
- Number: 6

Youth career
- –2005: Vasco da Gama
- 2005–2008: Fiorentina

Senior career*
Years	Team	Apps	(Gls)
2008–2009	Roma	4	(0)
2009–2013	Siena	0	(0)
2010–2011	→ Como (loan)	25	(2)
2011–2013	→ Varese (loan)	44	(1)
2013–	Perugia	29	(2)
2014–2015	→ Lecce (loan)	21	(0)
2016–	→ FK Partizani Tirana (loan)		
- * Club domestic league appearances and goals as of 6 July 2015

Filipe Gomes Ribeiro (born 25 May 1987 in Rio de Janeiro) is a Brazilian footballer who plays as a midfielder for the Albanian club Partizani.

== Career ==
Filipe started his football career playing with Vasco da Gama. In 2005, he was noted by Fiorentina director of football Pantaleo Corvino, and joined the Primavera squad. However, three consecutive knee injuries in two years did not allow him to ever become part of the first team, and he left Fiorentina by mutual consent in 2008. After his third knee injury, Filipe moved to Rome to start his rehabilitation, where he was allowed to use the AS Roma training facilities for such purposes, where Francesco Totti and Alessio Cerci were recovering from similar injuries. He was later noted by the AS Roma coaches and, after a trial period, he was offered a one-year contract with the giallorossi. On February 21, 2009 he finally made his Serie A debut, entering in the final minutes of a league match against Siena. On March 21, due to an injury crisis which saw the Capital club missing 10 first team players, Filipe made his first start for the first team in a 1–4 home defeat to Juventus.

In July 2009, after his contract with AS Roma was not extended, Filipe agreed a permanent deal with Serie A club Siena. Filipe wore no.23 shirt in 2010–11 pre-season, which later given to Franco Brienza.

He spent the 2010–11 season on loan to Lega Pro Prima Divisione club Como, playing 26 games and scoring twice. In July 2011 he was loaned out again, this time to Serie B club Varese.

In January 2016, Felipe agreed to a 6-month loan to play with the Albanian team of FK Partizani Tirana till the end of the season.
