= Klaudio Çema =

Albanian footballer

Personal information
- Date of birth: 22 April 1995 (age 31)
- Place of birth: Tirana, Albania
- Height: 1.85 m (6 ft 1 in)
- Position: Centre-back

Youth career
- –2014: Partizani Tirana

Senior career*
Years	Team	Apps	(Gls)
2012–2014	Partizani	4	(0)
2014	Partizani Tirana B	10	(0)
2015	→ Elbasani (loan)	7	(0)
2015–2017	Kukësi	1	(0)
2016	→ Tërbuni (loan)	5	(0)
2017	Lučko		
2018	Erzeni	5	(0)
2018	Dinamo Tirana	1	(0)
2019	Laçi	0	(0)
2019–2020	Elbasani	17	(2)

International career
2012	Albania U17	2	(0)
2013	Albania U19	1	(0)
- * Club domestic league appearances and goals

Klaudio Çema (born 22 April 1995) is an Albanian former professional footballer who played as a centre-back.

== Club career ==
On 2 June 2017, following the end of 2016–17 season, Çema was released by Kukësi after spending almost all the season on bench.

== Honours ==
Kukësi

- Albanian Superliga: 2016–17
