= Ardit Krymi =

Albanian footballer

Personal information
- Date of birth: 2 May 1996 (age 30)
- Place of birth: Shkodër, Albania
- Height: 1.81 m (5 ft 11 in)
- Position: Defensive midfielder

Team information
- Current team: Tirana

Youth career
- 2010–2014: Vllaznia Shkodër

Senior career*
| Years | Team | Apps | (Gls) |
| 2014–2022 | Vllaznia Shkodër | 226 | (8) |
| 2022–2023 | Shakhtyor Soligorsk | 21 | (0) |
| 2023–2026 | Vllaznia Shkodër | 99 | (0) |
| 2026– | Tirana | 6 | (0) |

International career
| 2015–2018 | Albania U21 | 8 | (0) |
- * Club domestic league appearances and goals as of 24 June 2026

Ardit Krymi (born 2 May 1996) is an Albanian professional footballer who plays as a defensive midfielder for Albanian club Tirana .

== Club career ==
In June 2022, he moved to Shakhtyor Soligorsk from Belarus.

== International career ==
Krymi was called up by coach Alban Bushi for the Friendly match against France U21 on 5 June 2017 and the 2019 UEFA European Under-21 Championship qualification opening match against Estonia U21 on 12 June. In the opening match of the qualifiers against Estonia U21, Krymi was an unused substitute in the bench for the entire match.

== Personal life ==
It has been reported that Krymi has been in a relationship with journalist Vjosana Nozllaku since April 2024.

== Career statistics ==
=== Club ===
As of 22 December 2017

Club statistics
| Club | Season | League | | | Cup | | Europe (Note: Including continental competitions, such as UEFA Champions League and UEFA Europa League) | | Other (Note: Including other competitions, such as Albanian Supercup) | | Total | |
| Club | Season | Division | Apps | Goals | Apps | Goals | Apps | Goals | Apps | Goals | Apps | Goals |
|---|---|---|---|---|---|---|---|---|---|---|---|---|
| Vllaznia Shkodër | 2014–15 | Albanian Superliga | 22 | 0 | 4 | 0 | — | | — | | 26 | 0 |
| Vllaznia Shkodër | 2015–16 | Albanian Superliga | 24 | 1 | 5 | 0 | — | | — | | 29 | 1 |
| Vllaznia Shkodër | 2016–17 | Albanian Superliga | 29 | 0 | 4 | 1 | — | | — | | 33 | 1 |
| Vllaznia Shkodër | 2017–18 | Albanian Superliga | 10 | 0 | 4 | 0 | — | | — | | 14 | 0 |
| Vllaznia Shkodër | Total | | 85 | 1 | 17 | 1 | — | | — | | 102 | 2 |
| Career total | | | 85 | 1 | 17 | 1 | — | | — | | 102 | 2 |
