= Ergi Borshi =

Albanian football player

Personal information
- Full name: Ergi Borshi
- Date of birth: 9 August 1995 (age 31)
- Place of birth: Shkodër, Albania
- Height: 1.81 m (5 ft 11 1/2 in)
- Position: Centre back

Team information
- Current team: Vllaznia (assistant coach)

Youth career
- –2014: Vllaznia Shkodër

Senior career*
Years	Team	Apps	(Gls)
2013–2016	Vllaznia	10	(0)
2014	→ Veleçiku (loan)	3	(0)
2016	→ Tërbuni (loan)	10	(0)
2016–2017	Teuta	8	(0)
2017	Kastrioti	3	(0)
2017–2018	Vllaznia B	9	(1)
2018–2019	Vllaznia	3	(0)
2019	Veleçiku		

International career
2012–2013	Albania U17	3	(0)
2013–2014	Albania U19	0	(0)
- * Club domestic league appearances and goals

Ergi Borshi (born 9 August 1995) is a retired Albanian football player who has played as a centerback for several teams in Abissnet Superiore. Due to an injury he quit playing football and became a coach. He currently works as assistant coach in KF.Vllaznia Shkodër.
