= Realdo Fili =

Albanian professional footballer

Personal information
- Date of birth: 14 May 1996 (age 30)
- Place of birth: Fier, Albania
- Height: 1.75 m (5 ft 9 in)
- Position: Forward

Team information
- Current team: Teuta Durrës
- Number: 28

Youth career
- 2010–2014: Apolonia

Senior career*
Years	Team	Apps	(Gls)
2012–2016	Apolonia	41	(5)
2016	Partizani B	4	(0)
2016–2018	Partizani	35	(3)
2018	Kamza	17	(2)
2018	Skënderbeu	10	(0)
2019–2020	Luftëtari	30	(5)
2020–2022	Botoșani	55	(8)
2022	Chornomorets Odesa	6	(0)
2023–	Teuta Durrës	23	(5)

International career^{‡}
2014	Albania U19	1	(1)
2015–2016	Albania U21	6	(0)
- * Club domestic league appearances and goals as of 1 June 2024 ‡ National team caps and goals as of 10 October 2016

Realdo Fili (born 14 May 1996) is an Albanian professional footballer who plays as a forward for Teuta Durrës.

== Club career ==
=== Apolonia ===
An Apolonia academy product, Fili made his first-team debut on 11 May 2013 in the last league match of 2012–13 season against Flamurtari at the age of 16 years and 363 days, playing the last 7 minutes of the goalless home draw. Apolonia finished the league in the last position, meaning that they are relegated and would spend the 2013–14 season in the Kategoria e Parë.

During the whole 2013–14 season, Fili didn't make a single league appearance, and was an unused substitute five times. His only match of the season was against Kukësi on 18 December 2013 in the returning leg of 2013–14 Albanian Cup second round, where he played the second half in an eventual 4–0 away defeat, which resulted Apolonia eliminated with the aggregate 4–1. Apolonia finished the league season as runners-up, promoting in the Kategoria Superiore along with Elbasani.

==== 2014–15 season ====
Apolonia commenced the league season with a 3–0 disappointing away loss to Tirana, in which Fili was an unused substitute for the entire match. Fili played his first league match of the season on 26 September 2014 against Kukësi, appearing as a second-half substitute for Renato Naçi in an eventual 0–1 home defeat. He began to gain more playing time by starting his first match of the season on 1 October during the 4–0 away win against Dinamo Tirana for the first leg of the first round of 2014–15 Albanian Cup.

With the arrival of the new coach Artan Mërgjyshi, who begun focusing on the new players, Fili begun to play more often, playing 63 minutes in the 2–0 defeat to Partizani at home in the first match of the 2015. Fili scored his first goal of the season on 28 February during the 2–2 home draw against Kukësi, which earned Apolonia the first point of the second part of the season. Fili continued his fine form by scoring the lone goal against the fellow relegation strugglers Elbasani, giving Apolonia three important points. Only three days later, Fili was on the scoresheet again, scoring against another survival rival, this time Teuta, to give Apolonia its second consecutive league win.

On 12 April, Fili scored a winner in the 88th minute against Flamurtari for a 2–1 home victory to help Apolonia reducing the gap with Teuta in their bid to escape relegation. On 9 May, Apolonia thrashed Elbasani 4–1 at home, to secure mathematically the penultimate spot and to reduce the gap with Teuta to only one point; Fili himself scored the fourth goal of the match. Eight days later, in the decisive match away against Teuta, Apolonia was defeated thanks to a last-minute winner of Ardit Peposhi, shattering the club's goal of surviving.

Fili finished his third season with Apolonia by playing 33 matches between league and cup, including 28 in league, scoring five times in the process. He was praised for his performances throughout the season along with the other youngster Myrto Uzuni. They were the target of many Kategoria Superiore clubs, but they did not leave due to their contract with the club. After the end of the season, he was named one of the Kategoria Superiore Talent of the Season along with his teammate Uzuni and other players.

=== Partizani ===
On 12 February 2016, Fili agreed personal terms and joined Kategoria Superiore side Partizani on a three-year deal, taking the vacant squad number 28 for the second part of 2015–16 season. Before signing with the club, Fili had to solve an issue with his old club Apolonia who didn't allow him to become a free agent, which lead Fili to send the case to the Dispute Resolution Chamber of AFA. This issue postponed his debut with the first team, as he first needed to debut with the B-team.

On 21 February 2016, Fili made his B-team debut in the match against Shënkolli, where he appeared as a 75th-minute substitute for Fabio Hasa in an eventual 1–1 home draw. He would make another appearance with the B-team on 6 March during the 1–1 away draw against Kevitan, playing full-90 minutes.

On 27 February, six days after making his debut with B-team, Fili finally debuted with the first team during the away goalless draw against the underdogs of Tërbuni, playing the last 20 minutes in place of Lorenc Trashi.

Fili missed out the start of the 2017–18 Kategoria Superiore due to a broken molar which gave him muscle pain and didn't allowed him to make a normal training session. He discovered it later in October 2017 and after fixing it he started to train along the team. He left the club on 30 January 2018, having played 48 matches in all competitions.

=== Kamza ===
On 31 January 2018, Fili completed a transfer to Kamza as a free agent by signing a one-year contract. He was given squad number 14, and debuted officially on 4 February against his former team Partizani, entering at the start of the second half as the match ended in a 2–1 loss. Fili opened his scoring account fourteen days later in the 1–2 loss to Skënderbeu, netting the opener in 11th minute with shot just outside the box which defeated goalie Orges Shehi; the goal earned notoriety which led Albania media to compare Fili with Alessandro Del Piero. Fili left the club in June 2018 after not agreeing to sign a new contract, finishing his short spell with 17 league appearances and 2 goals.

=== Skënderbeu ===
On 24 August 2018, Skënderbeu announced to have signed Fili on a three-year contract. He made his first appearance for the club on 31 August in the 1–1 home draw versus Laçi. Fili's first goal for his new side came on 26 September in a cup match against the lower league opposition Veleçiku; his goal, the fourth of the match, was scored in 85th minute after he came from the bench in the 65th minute. On 4 January of the following, Fili handed a transfer request which was granted, becoming the club's first departure in the winter transfer window. In an interview in the same month, Fili cited the lack of faith shown by coach Orges Shehi.

=== Luftëtari ===
On 5 January 2019, Fili joined Kategoria Superiore side Luftëtari on a 18-month contract with an option to renew based on his performances.

=== Botoșani ===
On 29 January 2020, Fili signed a contract with Romanian club Botoșani.

== International career ==
In February 2015, Fili was called up for the first time at the Albania under-21 by coach Skënder Gega in the squad from home league Albanian Superliga to participate in for a 3-days mini preparatory stage in Durrës, Albania from 22 to 25 February 2015.

In June 2015, Fili was called up again at Albania U21 by same coach Skënder Gega for the friendly matches against Kazakhstan U21 and Sweden U21. In the first match against Kazakhstan on 12 June, Fili was an unused substitute with Albania who lost the match 3–1. In the second friendly match four days later, Fili was able to make his U21 debut by playing in a 4–1 away loss against Sweden.

== Style of play ==
Fili has been compared with Apolonia Fier legend Kujtim Majaci by the fans of the club.

== Career statistics ==
=== Club ===
As of 18 March 2022

Club statistics
Club	Season	League			Cup		Europe		Other		Total	
Club	Season	Division	Apps	Goals	Apps	Goals	Apps	Goals	Apps	Goals	Apps	Goals
Apolonia	2012–13	Kategoria Superiore	1	0	0	0	—		—		1	0
Apolonia	2013–14	Kategoria e Parë	0	0	1	0	—		—		1	0
Apolonia	2014–15	Kategoria Superiore	28	5	5	0	—		—		33	5
Apolonia	2015–16	Kategoria e Parë	12	0	3	1	—		—		15	1
Apolonia	Total		41	5	9	1	—		—		50	6
Partizani B	2015–16	Kategoria e Dytë	2	0	—		—		—		2	0
Partizani B	2017–18	Kategoria e Dytë	2	0	—		—		—		2	0
Partizani B	Total		4	0	—		—		—		4	0
Partizani	2015–16	Kategoria Superiore	11	3	—		—		—		11	3
Partizani	2016–17	Kategoria Superiore	18	0	3	0	6	1	—		27	1
Partizani	2017–18	Kategoria Superiore	6	0	2	1	2 (Note: All appearance(s) in UEFA Europa League)	0	—		10	1
Partizani	Total		35	3	5	1	8	1	—		48	5
Kamza	2017–18	Kategoria Superiore	17	2	0	0	—		—		17	2
Skënderbeu	2018–19	Kategoria Superiore	10	0	2	1	—		—		12	1
Luftëtari	2018–19	Kategoria Superiore	16	2	6	2	—		—		22	4
Luftëtari	2019–20	Kategoria Superiore	14	3	2	1	—		—		16	4
Luftëtari	Total		30	5	8	3	—		—		38	8
Botoșani	2019–20	Liga I	4	0	—		—		—		4	0
Botoșani	2020–21	Liga I	25	7	2	0	0	0	—		27	7
Botoșani	2021–22	Liga I	26	1	0	0	—		—		26	1
Botoșani	Total		55	8	2	0	0	0	—		57	8
Career total			192	23	26	6	8	1	—		226	30
