= Ronaldo Rudović =

Montenegrin footballer (born 1996)

Personal information
- Full name: Ronaldo Rudović
- Date of birth: 12 June 1996 (age 30)
- Place of birth: Cetinje, FR Yugoslavia
- Height: 1.96 m (6 ft 5 in)
- Position: Centre-back

Team information
- Current team: Mornar
- Number: 15

Youth career
- 2014-2015: Waldhof Mannheim

Senior career*
Years	Team	Apps	(Gls)
2016	Vllaznia Shkodër	6	(0)
2016–2018	Novigrad	3	(0)
2018–2019	Otrant	25	(2)
2019–	Mornar	4	(0)
- * Club domestic league appearances and goals as of 16:02, 10 May 2019 (UTC)

Ronaldo Rudović (Albanian: Ronaldo Rudaj; born 14 January 1996) is a Montenegrin footballer who plays for FK Mornar in the Montenegrin First League as a centre-back.

== Club career ==
=== Vllaznia Shkodër ===
Rudović joined Albanian club Vllaznia Shkodër on a free transfer on 1 February 2016, where he was assigned number 18 for the second part of 2015–16 season. He made his league debut six days later, appearing as a 71st-minute substitute for Arsid Tafili in a 1–0 away defeat to Teuta Durrës. A week later, Rudović made his home debut, again as a substitute, during the 1–1 draw against Partizani Tirana.

=== FK Mornar ===
At the end of January 2019, Rudović joined FK Mornar in the Montenegrin First League.

== International career ==
In 2015, he was called up to the Montenegro national under-19 football team.

== Career statistics ==
=== Club ===
As of 15 February 2016

Club	Season	League			Cup		Continental (Note: Including continental competitions, such as UEFA Champions League and UEFA Cup/Europa League)		Other (Note: Including other competitions, such as Albanian Supercup)		Total	
Club	Season	Division	Apps	Goals	Apps	Goals	Apps	Goals	Apps	Goals	Apps	Goals
Vllaznia Shkodër	2015–16	Albanian Superliga	2	0	0	0	—		—		2	0
Vllaznia Shkodër	Total		2	0	0	0	—		—		2	0
Career total			2	0	0	0	0	0	0	0	2	0
