= Ditmar Bicaj =

Albanian football manager and player (born 1989)

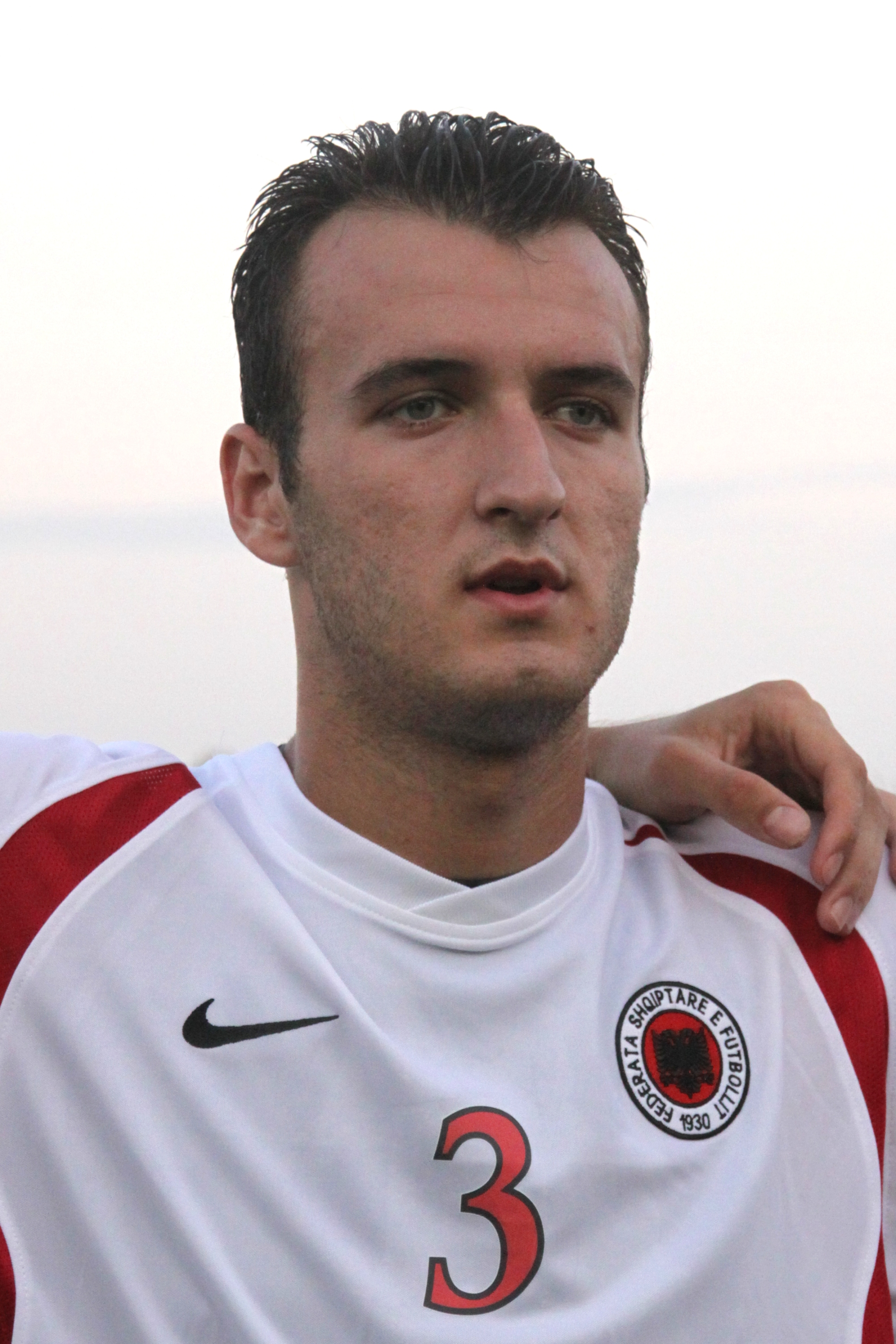
- Bicaj starting for Albania U21 in 2009

Personal information
- Date of birth: 26 February 1989 (age 37)
- Place of birth: Tirana, Albania
- Height: 1.93 m (6 ft 4 in)
- Position: Defender

Youth career
- 2000–2006: Dinamo Tirana

Senior career*
Years	Team	Apps	(Gls)
2006–2008	Dinamo Tirana	2	(0)
2008–2009	Belasitsa	20	(1)
2009–2010	Tirana	14	(0)
2010–2014	Skënderbeu	92	(6)
2014–2015	Tractor Sazi	10	(1)
2015–2016	Partizani Tirana	23	(1)
2016–2017	Vllaznia	29	(0)
2017–2018	Flamurtari	25	(3)
2018–2019	Teuta	26	(3)
2019–2020	Bylis	16	(0)
2020–2021	Skënderbeu	10	(0)
2021–2023	Flamurtari	79	(0)

International career
2005–2006	Albania U17	8	(0)
2008–2009	Albania U20	1	(0)
2007–2010	Albania U21	3	(0)
2010–2011	Albania	1	(0)

Managerial career
- 2024–2025: Burreli
- 2025: Lushnja
- * Club domestic league appearances and goals

Ditmar Bicaj (born 26 February 1989) is an Albanian professional football manager and former player who is the head coach.

He started his career at Dinamo Tirana, before representing Tirana, Skënderbeu and Kukësi in Albania, as well as Belasitsa and Tractor Sazi in Bulgaria and Iran respectively.

== Club career ==
=== Early career ===
Bicaj started his career in with his home town club, Dinamo Tirana at a very young age. After some impressive displays in the Albanian Superliga he attracted the attention of foreign clubs, one of those clubs was Belasitsa Petrich in Bulgaria. Bicaj signed a three-year deal with the Bulgarian club in the summer of 2008. The contract should have kept the Albanian at the Tsar Samuil Stadium until 2011. After the club was relegated he moved back to Albania at the champions of the country KF Tirana.

=== Skënderbeu Korçë ===
In July 2010, Bicaj signed for Skënderbeu Korçë. He went on to play for four seasons, winning four national championships.

=== Tractor Sazi ===
On 14 July 2014, Bicaj joined with Iranian team Tractor Sazi, signing a contract until 2016.

=== Partizani Tirana ===
On 9 June 2015, Bicaj returned in Albania and joined Partizani Tirana on a one-year contract. During his presentation, he said that Partizani was the right choice, adding that he would give his best to reach the club's goals.

=== Vllaznia Shkodër ===
On 1 August 2016, Bicaj completed a move to Vllaznia Shkodër by signing a one-year deal.

=== Flamurtari Vlorë ===
On 6 June 2017, Bicaj joined fellow Albanian Superliga side Flamurtari Vlorë by signing a contract until 2017–18 season. He scored his first goal for the team on 22 October in the matchday 7 of Albanian Superliga, a late header against Kamza at home which brought Flamurtari to winning ways after three consecutive draws. He was on the score-sheet again on 16 November, netting against his old team Skënderbeu Korçë in a 1–1 home win which ended the latter winning streak of 7 consecutive victories. He didn't celebrate as a sign of respect, which initially created confusion among his teammates. He finished the season with 25 league appearances, scoring 3 goals, his highest tally since 2012–13 season, as the team ended up in 6th place. On 31 May 2018, Bicaj confirmed that he will not be playing for Flamurtari in the next season, instead opting for a move outside Albania.

=== Teuta Durrës ===
On 30 July 2018, Teuta Durrës announced to have signed Bicaj on a one-year contract, reuniting him with his former teammate Bledi Shkëmbi, now as team manager.

== International career ==
He made his senior debut on 2 June 2010 in Albania's 1–0 win over Andorra at Qemal Stafa Stadium, where Bicaj entered as a substitute in the last moments.

== Career statistics ==
=== Club ===
As of 13 May 2018

Club statistics
Club	Season	League			Cup		Continental		Other		Total	
Club	Season	Division	Apps	Goals	Apps	Goals	Apps	Goals	Apps	Goals	Apps	Goals
Dinamo Tirana	2006–07	Albanian Superliga	1	0	0	0	—		—		1	0
Dinamo Tirana	2007–08	Albanian Superliga	0	0	0	0	—		—		1	0
Dinamo Tirana	Total		1	0	0	0	—		—		1	0
Belasitsa Petrich	2008–09	A Group	20	1	0	0	—		—		20	1
Tirana	2009–10	Albanian Superliga	14	0	3	0	0 (Note: All appearance(s) in UEFA Europa League)	0	0 (Note: Appearance in Albanian Supercup)	0	17	0
Tirana	2007–08	Albanian Superliga	—		—		1	0	—		1	0
Tirana	Total		14	0	3	0	1	0	0	0	18	0
Skënderbeu Korçë	2010–11	Albanian Superliga	23	0	3	0	—		—		26	0
Skënderbeu Korçë	2011–12	Albanian Superliga	19	0	8	0	2 (Note: All appearance(s) in UEFA Champions League)	0	1	0	30	0
Skënderbeu Korçë	2012–13	Albanian Superliga	24	5	7	1	2	0	1	0	34	6
Skënderbeu Korçë	2013–14	Albanian Superliga	27	1	7	0	2 (Note: Zero appearances in UEFA Champions League, two in UEFA Europa League)	0	1	0	37	1
Skënderbeu Korçë	Total		93	6	25	1	6	0	3	0	127	7
Kukësi (Note: Bicaj joined Kukesi only for the team's UEFA Europa League campaign)	2014–15	Albanian Superliga	—		—		2	0	—		2	0
Tractor Sazi	2014–15	Persian Gulf Pro League	10	1	0	0	0 (Note: All appearance(s) in AFC Champions League)	0	—		10	1
Partizani Tirana	2015–16	Albanian Superliga	23	1	1	0	2	0	—		26	1
Vllaznia Shkodër	2016–17	Albanian Superliga	29	0	4	0	—		—		33	0
Flamurtari Vlorë	2017–18	Albanian Superliga	25	3	5	0	—		—		30	3
Teuta Durrës	2018–19	Albanian Superliga	0	0	0	0	—		—		0	0
Career total			215	12	38	1	11	0	3	0	277	13

=== International ===
As of match played 2 June 2010

Appearances and goals by national team and year
National team	Year	Apps	Goals
Albania	2010	1	0
Total		1	0

== Honours ==
Dinamo Tirana

- Albanian Superliga: 2007–08

Skënderbeu Korçë

- Albanian Superliga: 2010–11, 2011–12, 2012–13, 2013–14
- Albanian Supercup: 2013
