= Jurgen Vatnikaj =

Albanian footballer

Personal information
- Date of birth: 8 August 1995 (age 31)
- Place of birth: Tirana, Albania
- Height: 1.90 m (6 ft 3 in)
- Position: Forward

Youth career
- 2005–2011: Partizani Tirana
- 2011–2013: Tirana
- 2013–2014: Partizani Tirana

Senior career*
Years	Team	Apps	(Gls)
2014–2017	Partizani Tirana	13	(4)
2014–2016	→ Partizani Tirana B	24	(20)
2015–2016	→ Tërbuni Pukë (loan)	11	(2)
2017–2018	Bylis Ballsh	8	(3)
2018–2019	Kastrioti Krujë	19	(4)
2019–2020	Flamurtari Vlorë	15	(3)

International career
2009	Albania U15	2	(1)
2011–2012	Albania U17	4	(0)
2014–2015	Albania U21	5	(1)
- * Club domestic league appearances and goals

Jurgen Vatnikaj (born 8 August 1995) is an Albanian former professional footballer who played as a forward.

== Club career ==
=== Early career ===
Vatnikaj joined his hometown club Partizani Tirana at the age of 10 in 2005 where he progressed through the club's youth teams before joining local rivals Tirana in 2011, where he initially played for the club's under-17 side. After one season with the under-17s, he was promoted to the under-19s at Tirana but he left the club in January 2013 and returned to Partizani Tirana, where he also played for the club's under-19s side.

=== Partizani Tirana ===
He made his professional debut on the last day of the 2013–14 Albanian Superliga against Lushnja on 10 May 2014, where he came on as a 64th-minute substitute and scored the last goal of the game on the 89th minute in the 4–2 away win for Partizani Tirana.

With the arrivals of Sebino Plaku, Xhevahir Sukaj and Emanuele Morini, Vatnikaj found his chances limited at Partizani so he joined newly promoted Albanian Superliga side Tërbuni Pukë on loan ahead of the 2015–16 season.

=== Bylis Ballsh ===
On 11 September 2017, Vatnikaj officially joined Albanian First Division side Bylis Ballsh by penning a one-year contract. He was presented along with his brother Junild. He made his debut five days later in the opening match of 2017–18 Albanian First Division against Shkumbini Peqin, finished in a 2–0 away win. He scored his first goal of 2017–18 season on 25 November in the matchday 9 against Apolonia Fier as Bylis was defeated 3–1.

=== Kastrioti Krujë ===
In the deadline day of winter transfer window, Vatnikaj become a player of fellow First Division side Kastrioti Krujë for an undisclosed fee. He played his first match for the club later on 10 March 2018 by entering in the final minutes of a goalless draw versus Besëlidhja Lezhë. He opened his scoring account on 21 April in the 1–1 draw at Dinamo Tirana. Kastrioti eventually finished top in the Group A, meaning that they have secured a top flight spot for the next season. In the final versus the Group B winner Tirana, Vatnikaj entered in the last 14 minutes as Kastrioti lost 2–0 at Elbasan Arena.

== International career ==
=== Under-15 ===
Vatnikaj's youth international career begun with the under-15 squad under Sulejman Demollari in 2009, where he played in the qualifying games of 2010 Summer Youth Olympics. He played two times and scored once, the opener in the 2–0 win over Liechtenstein on 17 October.

=== Under-17 ===
Later in 2011 he was promoted to under-17 side, being called up by manager Džemal Mustedanagić for the qualifying games of 2012 UEFA European Under-17 Championship in October. He made his first appearance for the team in the opening qualifying match versus Slovakia, coming on as a late replacement for Frans Ymeralilaj, who had given Albania the win thanks to his brace. He went on to play another against Estonia which ended in a 1–1; this result secured Albania a place in the elite round of the European Championship for the first time in 9 seasons. In the elite round, Vatnikaj continued to be a substitute, appearing only in the last minutes as Albania was eliminated after finished 3rd in Group 5.

=== Under-19 ===
Albania U19 – Vatnikaj was part of national team in two matches against Moldavia.

=== Under-21 ===
In November 2014, Vatnikaj participated with Albania U21 in the friendly tournament held in Dubai. He scored in the first match against Bahrain that was won by Albania 3–2.

Later in March 2015, Vatnikaj was called up again for the opening 2017 UEFA U21 Championship qualifier against Liechtenstein on 28 March 2015. He was given the number 11 shirt and started the match partnering Rey Manaj in attack. He played only in the first half as the 2–0 away victory saw Albania off to a winning start.

== Personal life ==
His brother Junild is also a professional footballer who plays at Bylis Ballsh.

== Career statistics ==
As of 16 May 2018

Club statistics
Club	Season	League			Cup		Europe		Other		Total	
Club	Season	Division	Apps	Goals	Apps	Goals	Apps	Goals	Apps	Goals	Apps	Goals
Partizani Tirana	2013–14	Albanian Superliga	1	1	—		—		—		1	1
Partizani Tirana	2014–15	Albanian Superliga	10	0	5	0	0	0	—		15	0
Partizani Tirana	2015–16	Albanian Superliga	0	0	1	0	0	0	—		1	0
Partizani Tirana	2016–17	Albanian Superliga	1	0	3	1	0	0	—		4	1
Partizani Tirana	Total		12	1	9	1	0	0	—		21	2
Tërbuni Pukë (loan)	2015–16	Albanian Superliga	11	2	0	0	—		—		11	2
Bylis Ballsh	2017–18	Albanian Superliga	8	1	2	0	—		—		10	1
Kastrioti Krujë	2017–18	Albanian Superliga	11	2	0	0	—		—		11	2
Career total			42	6	14	1	0	0	—		56	7
