= Alsid Tafili =

Albanian footballer

Personal information
- Date of birth: 20 August 1987 (age 39)
- Place of birth: Shkodër, Albania
- Height: 1.85 m (6 ft 1 in)
- Position: Midfielder

Youth career
- 2000–2005: Vllaznia

Senior career*
Years	Team	Apps	(Gls)
2005–2006	Vllaznia	19	(1)
2006–2007	Elbasani	3	(0)
2007–2008	Ada	26	(3)
2008–2009	Tërbuni	22	(5)
2009	Laçi	3	(0)
2010	Liria Prizren		
2010–2011	Teuta	29	(2)
2011	Panachaiki	8	(0)
2012	Liria Prizren	17	(11)
2012–2015	Vllaznia	85	(5)
2015	Partizani	8	(0)
2016–2019	Vllaznia	101	(5)
2019–2020	Liria Prizren		
2020–2022	Besa Kavajë	32	(1)
2022–2023	Tërbuni	34	(2)

International career
2006–2007	Albania U-19	3	(0)
2007–2008	Albania U-21	3	(0)
- * Club domestic league appearances and goals

Alsid Tafili (born 20 August 1987) is an Albanian former footballer.

== Club career ==
He announced to leave Partizani in January 2016, only to rejoin Vllaznia a day later. In June 2019, Tafili rejoined Liria Prizren for the third time.
