= Fabio Hasa =

Albanian footballer

Personal information
- Date of birth: 12 August 1996 (age 30)
- Place of birth: Tirana, Albania
- Height: 1.75 m (5 ft 9 in)
- Position: Defensive midfielder

Team information
- Current team: Flamurtari
- Number: 2

Youth career
- 2011–2012: FC Term
- 2012–2016: Partizani Tirana

Senior career*
Years	Team	Apps	(Gls)
2016–2017	Teuta	5	(0)
2017–2018	Dinamo Tirana	21	(1)
2018–2019	Turbina	22	(2)
2019–2020	Tërbuni	22	(2)
2020–2023	Burreli	70	(2)
2023–	Flamurtari	19	(0)
- * Club domestic league appearances and goals as of 1 June 2024

Fabio Hasa (born 12 August 1996) is an Albanian professional footballer who plays as a defensive midfielder for Kategoria e Parë club Flamurtari in Albania.
