= 2020–21 Kategoria e Dytë =

Kategoria e Dytë
- Season: 2020–21
- Champions: Shkumbini; 2nd title
- Promoted: Butrinti; Maliqi; Shkumbini; Tërbuni
- Relegated: Delvina; Mirdita; Skrapari
- Matches: 289
- Goals: 975 (3.37 per match)
- Top goalscorer: Ledjon Xhymerti (20 goals)
- Biggest home win: Iliria 10−1 Mirdita (8 November 2020)
- Biggest away win: Mirdita 1−7 Luzi 2008 (24 December 2020)
- Highest scoring: Bulqiza 9−2 Internacional (23 April 2021); Iliria 10−1 Mirdita (8 November 2020)
- Longest winning run: 10 matches Maliqi
- Longest unbeaten run: 25 matches Shkumbini
- Longest winless run: 14 matches Internacional; Përmeti
- Longest losing run: 12 matches Mirdita

The 2020-21 Kategoria e Dytë was the 51st official season of the Albanian football third division since its establishment. There were 27 teams competing this season, split in 2 groups. The winners of the groups played the league's final against each other and also gained promotion to the 2021-22 Kategoria e Parë. Teams ranked from the 2nd to the 5th position qualified to the play-off round which they played against the 7th ranked teams in the 2020-21 Kategoria e Parë. Butrinti, Maliqi, Shkumbini and Tërbuni were promoted to the 2021–22 Kategoria e Parë. Shkumbini won their second Kategoria e Dytë title after beating Maliqi in the final match.

== Changes from last season ==
=== Team changes ===
==== From Kategoria e Dytë ====
Promoted to Kategoria e Parë:

- Partizani B
- Tomori
- Vora

==== To Kategoria e Dytë ====
Relegated from Kategoria e Parë:

- Devolli
- Iliria
- Shënkolli
- Shkumbini
- Tërbuni

Promoted from Kategoria e Tretë:

- Bulqiza
- Labëria
- Valbona

=== Locations ===
2020–21 Group A Kategoria e Dytë teams.
2020–21 Group B Kategoria e Dytë teams.

=== Stadia by capacity and locations ===
==== Group A ====
Team	Location	Stadium	Capacity
Ada	Velipojë	Adriatik Velipojë	1,200
Bulqiza	Bulqizë	Internacional Complex	1,000
Gramshi	Gramsh	Mislim Koçi Stadium	1,500
Iliria	Fushë-Krujë	Redi Maloku Stadium	3,000
Internacional Tirana	Tirana	Internacional Complex	1,000
Klosi	Klos	QKS Kamëz	
Luzi 2008	Luz i Vogël	Luz i Vogël Stadium	600
Mirdita	Rrëshen	Shënkoll Stadium	500
Sopoti	Librazhd	Sopoti Stadium	3,000
Spartaku	Tirana		2,500
Shënkolli	Shënkoll	Shënkoll Stadium	500
Shkumbini	Peqin	Shkumbini Stadium	5,000
Tërbuni	Pukë	Ismail Xhemali Stadium	1,950
Valbona	Bajram Curri	Tropojë Stadium	

==== Group B ====
Team	Location	Stadium	Capacity
Albpetrol	Patos	Alush Noga Stadium	2,150
Butrinti	Sarandë	Butrinti Stadium	5,000
Delvina	Delvinë	Panajot Pano Stadium	2,500
Devolli	Bilisht	Bilisht Stadium	3,000
Gramozi	Ersekë	Ersekë Stadium	2,000
Këlcyra	Këlcyrë	Fusha Sportive Këlcyrë	1,000
Labëria	Vlorë	Labëria Complex	
Maliqi	Maliq	Jovan Asko Stadium	1,500
Memaliaj	Memaliaj	Karafil Çaushi Stadium	1,500
Naftëtari	Kuçovë	Bashkim Sulejmani Stadium	5,000
Përmeti	Përmet	Durim Qypi Stadium	4,000
Skrapari	Çorovodë	Skrapar Sports Field	1,500
Tepelena	Tepelenë	Sabaudin Shehu Stadium	2,000

== League standings ==
=== Group A ===
Pos	Team	Pld	W	D	L	GF	GA	GD	Pts	Promotion or relegation
1	Shkumbini (C, P)	24	20	4	0	84	11	+73	64	Promotion to 2021–22 Kategoria e Parë
2	Sopoti	24	17	4	3	71	20	+51	55	Play-off promotion to 2021–22 Kategoria e Parë
3	Tërbuni (O, P)	24	15	6	3	52	19	+33	51	Play-off promotion to 2021–22 Kategoria e Parë
4	Luzi 2008	24	13	7	4	45	17	+28	46	Play-off promotion to 2021–22 Kategoria e Parë
5	Bulqiza	24	12	5	7	54	44	+10	41	Play-off promotion to 2021–22 Kategoria e Parë
6	Gramshi	24	11	7	6	33	31	+2	40	
7	Iliria	24	10	4	10	56	36	+20	34	
8	Ada	24	9	3	12	29	49	−20	30	
9	Valbona (Note: Valbona were relegated to the 2021–22 Kategoria e Tretë, after failing to get licensed for the next season.) (R)	24	7	5	12	28	39	−11	26	Relegation to 2021–22 Kategoria e Tretë
10	Internacional Tirana	24	4	3	17	34	74	−40	15	
11	Klosi (Note: Klosi were deducted 6 points after failing to host their home match against Shkumbini and after fielding an ineligible player against Bulqiza.)	24	6	1	17	17	53	−36	13	
12	Shënkolli (Note: Shënkolli were deducted 6 points, after fielding ineligible players against Gramshi and Klosi.) (O)	24	5	2	17	29	67	−38	11	Play-off relegation to 2021–22 Kategoria e Tretë
13	Mirdita (Note: Mirdita were deducted 3 points, after failing to host their home match against Ada. They were also deducted a further 6 points after fielding an ineligible player against Sopoti.) (R)	24	1	1	22	15	87	−72	−5	Relegation to 2021–22 Kategoria e Tretë
14	Spartaku (E, R)	0	0	0	0	0	0	0	0	Withdrew

Source: Soccerway
Rules for classification: 1) points; 2) head-to-head points; 3) head-to-head goal difference; 4) goal difference; 5) number of goals scored; 6) draw. (Head-to-head record is applied for clubs with the same number of points only once all matches between said clubs have been played.)
(C) Champions; (E) Eliminated; (O) Play-off winners; (P) Promoted; (R) Relegated

==== Results ====
Home \ Away	ADA	BUL	GRA	ILI	INT	KLO	LUZ	MIR	SOP	SHË	SHK	TËR	VAL
Ada	—	1–0	1–2	1–0	2–1	3–1	0–1	2–0	0–4	3–2	0–3	1–3	1–0
Bulqiza	2–2	—	2–3	4–1	9–2	2–1	2–1	4–1	1–2	5–3	1–2	0–3	2–1
Gramshi	1–1	1–1	—	1–0	4–2	1–0	0–0	1–0	0–1	3–1	0–3	1–1	1–0
Iliria	4–0	1–1	1–1	—	7–1	8–0	0–2	10–1	1–2	5–2	1–3	1–0	3–2
Internacional Tirana	4–3	0–1	1–2	1–3	—	4–2	0–1	5–1	3–7	5–2	2–5	0–0	1–1
Klosi	0–2	0–3	1–1	1–0	2–0	—	0–1	1–0	1–4	0–2	0–3	1–4	2–1
Luzi 2008	5–0	1–1	2–0	1–1	2–0	2–0	—	8–0	2–2	2–0	2–2	0–2	2–1
Mirdita	0–3	2–4	1–6	1–2	1–1	0–1	1–7	—	0–2	0–1	0–4	1–4	0–4
Sopoti	6–0	5–1	2–0	4–1	6–0	2–0	0–0	3–0	—	8–1	1–1	1–1	7–0
Shënkolli	2–1	1–2	0–3	2–2	1–0	0–3	1–3	3–4	1–0	—	1–2	2–4	0–0
Shkumbini	3–0	6–0	8–1	3–0	4–0	7–0	0–0	6–0	4–0	6–0	—	0–0	4–2
Tërbuni	4–1	3–3	2–0	1–0	7–1	1–0	2–0	3–0	0–1	4–0	0–3	—	2–2
Valbona	1–1	1–3	0–0	1–4	1–0	2–0	2–0	2–1	2–1	2–1	0–2	0–1	—

Source: Soccerway
Legend: Blue = home team win; Yellow = draw; Red = away team win.
For upcoming matches, an "a" indicates there is an article about the rivalry between the two participants.

=== Group B ===
Pos	Team	Pld	W	D	L	GF	GA	GD	Pts	Promotion or relegation
1	Maliqi (P)	24	21	3	0	60	11	+49	66	Promotion to 2021–22 Kategoria e Parë
2	Butrinti (O, P)	24	19	3	2	50	11	+39	60	Play-off promotion to 2021–22 Kategoria e Parë
3	Labëria	24	18	3	3	51	12	+39	57	Play-off promotion to 2021–22 Kategoria e Parë
4	Devolli	24	13	4	7	46	24	+22	43	Play-off promotion to 2021–22 Kategoria e Parë
5	Naftëtari	24	12	2	10	34	23	+11	38	Play-off promotion to 2021–22 Kategoria e Parë
6	Tepelena	24	9	3	12	24	38	−14	30	
7	Albpetrol	24	7	6	11	27	32	−5	27	
8	Përmeti	24	8	3	13	27	41	−14	27	
9	Këlcyra	24	7	4	13	22	42	−20	25	
10	Gramozi	24	7	3	14	28	43	−15	24	
11	Memaliaj (O)	24	6	6	12	23	38	−15	24	Play-off relegation to 2021–22 Kategoria e Tretë
12	Delvina (R)	24	3	5	16	15	40	−25	14	Relegation to 2021–22 Kategoria e Tretë
13	Skrapari (R)	24	1	5	18	20	72	−52	8	Relegation to 2021–22 Kategoria e Tretë

Source: Soccerway
Rules for classification: 1) points; 2) head-to-head points; 3) head-to-head goal difference; 4) goal difference; 5) number of goals scored; 6) draw. (Head-to-head record is applied for clubs with the same number of points only once all matches between said clubs have been played.)
(O) Play-off winners; (P) Promoted; (R) Relegated

==== Results ====
Home \ Away	ALB	BUT	DEL	DEV	GRM	KËL	LAB	MAL	MEM	NAF	PËR	SKR	TEP
Albpetrol	—	0–1	2–1	0–1	1–1	0–0	2–3	0–1	4–1	0–4	2–0	0–0	4–0
Butrinti	4–0	—	2–0	2–1	1–0	7–0	2–0	0–1	2–0	1–0	4–2	4–0	3–0
Delvina	0–3	0–0	—	0–0	3–0	0–1	0–1	1–3	1–4	0–1	0–1	3–1	3–2
Devolli	0–1	2–1	2–0	—	5–0	1–2	0–2	0–1	2–2	2–1	1–0	7–0	2–1
Gramozi	1–2	0–2	2–0	1–2	—	2–1	0–4	1–3	1–0	2–0	5–2	5–0	2–0
Këlcyra	2–2	0–2	0–0	0–2	4–3	—	0–1	0–2	1–0	1–0	1–0	3–1	1–2
Labëria	2–0	2–2	4–0	3–2	2–0	2–0	—	0–1	4–0	1–2	3–0	6–1	3–0
Maliqi	4–1	1–1	3–0	1–1	4–0	4–0	0–0	—	3–0	1–0	3–1	7–1	4–0
Memaliaj	2–1	0–1	2–1	2–4	0–0	1–1	0–0	0–3	—	0–2	0–1	3–1	2–1
Naftëtari	1–0	1–2	3–0	0–4	3–1	2–0	0–2	0–1	1–1	—	2–0	3–0	3–1
Përmeti	1–0	0–1	0–0	3–2	2–1	4–2	0–1	4–5	0–0	1–0	—	2–2	0–2
Skrapari	2–2	1–3	2–2	1–3	0–0	3–2	0–3	0–3	0–1	1–4	1–2	—	1–2
Tepelena	0–0	0–2	1–0	0–0	2–0	1–0	0–2	0–1	3–2	1–1	3–1	2–1	—

Source: Soccerway
Legend: Blue = home team win; Yellow = draw; Red = away team win.
For upcoming matches, an "a" indicates there is an article about the rivalry between the two participants.

== Final ==
29 May 2021
16:00

Shkumbini	1−0	Maliqi
Barbosa 9'

Elbasan Arena, Elbasan

== Group A Promotion play-offs ==
Semi-finals
Sopoti	5
Bulqiza	1
Tërbuni	0
Luzi 2008	0

Final
Sopoti	1
Tërbuni	2

== Semi-finals ==
26 May 2021
17:00

Sopoti	5−1	Bulqiza
Sejdini 27', 86'; Çota 33'; Kullafi 72'; Jugu 75'		Saliaj 14'

Sopoti Stadium, Librazhd

26 May 2021
17:00

Tërbuni	0−0	Luzi 2008

Ismail Xhemali Stadium, Pukë

Tërbuni qualified to the final as the team with the better ranking.

== Final ==
31 May 2021
16:00

Sopoti	1−2	Tërbuni
Sejdini 35'		Hithi 30'; Keko 57'

Selman Stërmasi Stadium, Tirana

Tërbuni qualified to the final play-off match.

== Group B Promotion play-offs ==
Semi-finals
Butrinti	1
Naftëtari	0
Labëria	1
Devolli	0

Final
Butrinti	1
Labëria	0

== Semi-finals ==
27 May 2021
17:00

Butrinti	1−0	Naftëtari
Llojaj 80'

Andon Lapa Stadium, Sarandë

27 May 2021
17:00

Labëria	1−0	Devolli
Dhrami 25'

Labëria Complex, Nartë

== Final ==
31 May 2021
16:00

Butrinti	1−0	Labëria
Mirani 17'

Roza Haxhiu Stadium, Lushnjë

Butrinti qualified to the final play-off match.

== Relegation play-offs ==
28 May 2021
16:00

Memaliaj	2−5	Shënkolli
Zogu 2'; Jaupi 82'		Lleshi 35', 57', 85'; Djala 53'; Vukaj 72'

Roza Haxhiu Stadium, Lushnjë

5 June 2021
16:00

Memaliaj	3−1 (a.e.t.)	Osumi
Zogu 72'; Sinaj 102'; Mamaj 120'		Daullxhiu 72'

Roza Haxhiu Stadium, Lushnjë

Both teams remained in their respective leagues.

== Season statistics ==
=== Scoring ===
==== Top scorers ====
Rank	Player	Club	Goals
1	(Albania) Ledjon Xhymerti	Iliria	20
2	(Albania) Artur Sejdini	Sopoti	19
3	(Albania) Albers Keko	Tërbuni	18
3	(Albania) Rigers Balliu	Bulqiza	18
5	(Albania) Mario Gurma	Butrinti	16
5	(Albania) Mirel Çota	Sopoti	16
7	(Albania) Eriol Merdini	Bulqiza	15
8	(Albania) Eri Lamçja	Shkumbini	14
