= 2026–27 Kategoria e Tretë =

Kategoria e Tretë
- Season: 2026–27
- Matches: 52
- Goals: 216 (4.15 per match)
- Top goalscorer: Enes Koçi (6 goals)
- Biggest home win: Dinamo B 7−0 Tirana B (30 October 2026); Osumi 7−0 Gramozi (21 November 2026)
- Biggest away win: Lefter Millo 2−6 Tepelena (21 November 2026); Shkodra 0−4 Miloti (24 October 2026)
- Highest scoring: Kinostudio 7−1 Gramozi (7 November 2026); Lefter Millo 2−6 Tepelena (21 November 2026)
- Longest winning run: 4 matches Dinamo City B Turbina
- Longest unbeaten run: 4 matches Bulqiza; Dinamo City B Kinostudio; Miloti; Turbina
- Longest winless run: 5 matches Adriatiku; Gramozi; Lefter Millo; Mirdita
- Longest losing run: 4 matches Tirana B

The 2026–27 Kategoria e Tretë is the 24th official season of the Albanian football fourth division since its establishment. The season began on 24 October 2026 and will end in May 2027. There are 24 teams competing this season, split in 2 groups.

== Changes from last season ==
=== Team changes ===
==== From Kategoria e Tretë ====
Promoted to Kategoria e Dytë:

- Albpetrol
- Memaliaj
- Vllaznia B

==== To Kategoria e Tretë ====
Relegated from Kategoria e Dytë:

- Adriatiku
- Shkumbini
2026–27 Kategoria e Tretë teams:
Group A; Group B

=== Stadia by capacity and locations ===
==== Group A ====
Team	Location	Stadium	Capacity
Adriatiku	Katund i Ri	Aneksi Niko Dovana	
Bulqiza	Bulqizë	Bulqiza Stadium	
Dinamo City B	Tirana	Kompleksi Sportiv FC Dinamo	
Korabi B	Peshkopi	Korabi Stadium	6,000
Kukësi B	Kukës	National Sports Centre	50
Miloti	Milot	National Sports Centre	50
Mirdita	Rrëshen	Kompleksi Sportiv Porto	
North United	Shkodër	Fusha Djelmnia Shkodrane	
Shënkolli	Shënkoll	Shënkolli Stadium	
Shkodra	Shkodër	Kompleksi Sportiv KF Shkodra	
Tirana B	Tirana	Skënder Halili Complex	
T-Kamza	Kamëz	Internacional Complex	1,000

==== Group B ====
Team	Location	Stadium	Capacity
Besa Elite	Kavajë	Aneksi Niko Dovana	
Egnatia B	Rrogozhinë	Fusha e Plugut	
Gramozi	Ersekë	Ersekë Stadium	2,000
Kinostudio	Tirana	National Sports Centre	50
Lefter Millo	Derviçan	Sabaudin Shehu Stadium	2,000
Osumi	Ura Vajgurore	Osumi Stadium	
Përmeti	Përmet	Durim Qypi Stadium	2,000
Shkumbini	Peqin	Shkumbini Stadium	9,000
Skrapari	Çorovodë	Skrapar Sports Field	1,500
Sopoti B	Librazhd	Sopoti Stadium	3,000
Tepelena	Tepelenë	Sabaudin Shehu Stadium	2,000
Turbina	Cërrik	Nexhip Trungu Stadium	6,600

== League standings ==
=== Group A ===
Pos	Team	Pld	W	D	L	GF	GA	GD	Pts	Promotion
1	Dinamo City B	4	4	0	0	17	3	+14	12	Promotion to 2027–28 Kategoria e Dytë
2	Bulqiza	4	3	1	0	10	1	+9	10	Promotion to 2027–28 Kategoria e Dytë
3	Miloti	4	3	1	0	10	1	+9	10	Play-off promotion to 2027–28 Kategoria e Dytë
4	Korabi B	4	2	1	1	9	8	+1	7	
5	North United	4	2	1	1	10	13	−3	7	
6	Kukësi B	4	2	0	2	13	9	+4	6	
7	Shënkolli	4	2	0	2	6	6	0	6	
8	Shkodra	3	1	0	2	3	11	−8	3	
9	Tirana B	5	1	0	4	8	19	−11	3	
10	Adriatiku	5	0	1	4	6	11	−5	1	
11	Mirdita	5	0	1	4	5	15	−10	1	
12	T-Kamza	0	0	0	0	0	0	0	0	Withdrew

Updated to match(es) played on 22 November 2026. Source:
Rules for classification: 1) points; 2) head-to-head points; 3) head-to-head goal difference; 4) goal difference; 5) number of goals scored; 6) draw. (Head-to-head record is applied for clubs with the same number of points only once all matches between said clubs have been played.)

=== Results ===
Home \ Away	ADR	BUL	DIN	KOR	KUK	MIL	MIR	NOR	SHË	SHD	TIR
Adriatiku	—		1–2						0–2		
Bulqiza		—			4–0		3–0		3–1		
Dinamo B			—					5–0			7–0
Korabi B				—		0–2		3–3			
Kukësi B				2–4	—		5–1			6–0	
Miloti		0–0				—					
Mirdita	1–1		2–3				—				
North United	3–2							—			
Shënkolli				1–2					—		2–1
Shkodra						0–4	3–1			—	
Tirana B	3–2					1–4		3–4			—

Updated to match(es) played on 22 November 2026. Source:
Legend: Blue = home team win; Yellow = draw; Red = away team win.
For upcoming matches, an "a" indicates there is an article about the rivalry between the two participants.

=== Group B ===
Pos	Team	Pld	W	D	L	GF	GA	GD	Pts	Promotion
1	Turbina	5	4	0	1	13	6	+7	12	Promotion to 2027–28 Kategoria e Dytë
2	Skrapari	5	3	1	1	8	6	+2	10	Promotion to 2027–28 Kategoria e Dytë
3	Sopoti B	4	3	0	1	8	7	+1	9	Play-off promotion to 2027–28 Kategoria e Dytë
4	Besa Elite	5	3	0	2	12	6	+6	9	
5	Kinostudio	4	2	2	0	13	6	+7	8	
6	Përmeti	5	2	1	2	11	8	+3	7	
7	Egnatia B	5	2	1	2	8	7	+1	7	
8	Shkumbini	5	2	1	2	9	10	−1	7	
9	Osumi	5	2	0	3	14	10	+4	6	
10	Tepelena	5	2	0	3	13	10	+3	6	
11	Lefter Millo	5	0	1	4	5	19	−14	1	
12	Gramozi	5	0	1	4	5	24	−19	1	

Updated to match(es) played on 22 November 2026. Source:
Rules for classification: 1) points; 2) head-to-head points; 3) head-to-head goal difference; 4) goal difference; 5) number of goals scored; 6) draw. (Head-to-head record is applied for clubs with the same number of points only once all matches between said clubs have been played.)

=== Results ===
Home \ Away	BES	EGN	GRA	KIN	LEF	OSU	PËR	SHK	SKR	SOP	TEP	TUR
Besa Elite	—				5–0				2–0			
Egnatia B		—				3–1			1–2			
Gramozi			—		2–2			2–3				
Kinostudio		2–2	7–1	—		4–3						
Lefter Millo					—			1–3			2–6	
Osumi			7–0			—	1–2				2–1	
Përmeti			5–0	0–0			—			2–3		
Shkumbini	1–3							—				1–3
Skrapari							4–2	1–1	—		1–0	
Sopoti B	2–1	1–0								—		
Tepelena										4–2	—	2–3
Turbina	3–1	1–2			3–0							—

Updated to match(es) played on 22 November 2026. Source:
Legend: Blue = home team win; Yellow = draw; Red = away team win.
For upcoming matches, an "a" indicates there is an article about the rivalry between the two participants.

== Top scorers ==
Rank	Player	Club	Goals
1	(Albania) Enes Koçi	Përmeti	6
2	(Albania) Alvaro Farruku	Bulqiza	5
2	(Albania) Franci Hysalliu	Dinamo City B	5
4	(Albania) Edmir Vidrica	Kukësi B	4
4	(Ghana) Enoch Adjei	Miloti	4
4	(Albania) Egin Bajraktari	Kinostudio	4
4	(Nigeria) Elyon Areola	North United	4
4	(Albania) Kristian Maci	Tepelena	4
4	(Albania) Nikolas Karakashi	Osumi	4
