= 2024–25 Kategoria e Dytë =

Kategoria e Dytë
- Season: 2024–25
- Champions: Iliria; 2nd title
- Promoted: Iliria; Luftëtari
- Relegated: Memaliaj; Murlani; Turbina
- Matches: 233
- Goals: 790 (3.39 per match)
- Top goalscorer: Adhurim Hasani (19 goals)
- Biggest home win: Gramshi 10−1 Murlani (1 March 2025)
- Biggest away win: Memaliaj 0−7 Oriku (5 April 2025)
- Highest scoring: Gramshi 10−1 Murlani (1 March 2025); Murlani 3−8 Adriatiku (30 March 2025)
- Longest winning run: 16 matches Iliria
- Longest unbeaten run: 18 matches Iliria; Luftëtari
- Longest winless run: 22 matches Murlani
- Longest losing run: 14 matches Murlani

The 2024–25 Kategoria e Dytë was the 55th official season of the Albanian football third division since its establishment. There were 23 teams competing this season, split in 2 groups. The winners of the groups played the league's final against each other and also gained promotion to the 2025–26 Kategoria e Parë. Teams ranked from the 2nd to the 5th position qualified to the play-off round where the winners will play against the 9th and 10th ranked teams in the 2024–25 Kategoria e Parë. Iliria and Luftëtari were promoted to the 2025–26 Kategoria e Parë. Iliria won their second Kategoria e Dytë title after beating Luftëtari in the final match.

== Changes from last season ==
=== Team changes ===
==== From Kategoria e Dytë ====
Promoted to Kategoria e Parë:

- Pogradeci
- Valbona

Relegated to Kategoria e Tretë:

- Labëria
- Shënkolli

==== To Kategoria e Dytë ====
Relegated from Kategoria e Parë:

- Luzi 2008
- Tomori

Promoted from Kategoria e Tretë:

- Basania
- Memaliaj

=== Locations ===
2024–25 Group A Kategoria e Dytë teams.
2024–25 Group B Kategoria e Dytë teams.

==== Group A ====
Team	Location	Stadium	Capacity
Adriatiku	Katund i Ri	Vorë Stadium	
Albanët	Tirana	Internacional Complex	1,000
Basania	Bushat	Basania Stadium	
Besëlidhja	Lezhë	Brian Filipi Stadium	5,000
Gramshi	Gramsh	Mislim Koçi Stadium	3,100
Iliria	Fushë-Krujë	Redi Maloku Stadium	3,000
Luzi 2008	Luz i Vogël	Luz i Vogël Stadium	600
Murlani	Vau i Dejës	Barbullush Stadium	
Naftëtari	Kuçovë	Bashkim Sulejmani Stadium	5,000
Sopoti	Librazhd	Sopoti Stadium	3,000
Tërbuni	Pukë	Ismail Xhemali Stadium	1,950
Veleçiku	Koplik	Kompleksi Vëllezërit Duli	2,000

==== Group B ====
Team	Location	Stadium	Capacity
Butrinti	Sarandë	Andon Lapa Stadium	5,500
Delvina	Delvinë	Panajot Pano Stadium	2,500
Devolli	Bilisht	Bilisht Stadium	3,000
Këlcyra	Këlcyrë	Demir Allamani Stadium	1,000
Luftëtari	Gjirokastër	Gjirokastra Stadium	8,400
Maliqi	Maliq	Jovan Asko Stadium	1,500
Memaliaj	Memaliaj	Karafil Çaushi Stadium	1,500
Oriku	Orikum	Orikum Stadium	2,000
Shkumbini	Peqin	Shkumbini Stadium	9,000
Tomori	Berat	Tomori Stadium	19,230
Turbina	Cërrik	Nexhip Trungu Stadium	6,600

== League standings ==
=== Group A ===
Pos	Team	Pld	W	D	L	GF	GA	GD	Pts	Promotion or relegation
1	Iliria (C, P)	22	18	3	1	56	12	+44	57	Promotion to 2025–26 Kategoria e Parë
2	Luzi 2008	22	18	2	2	53	16	+37	56	Play-off promotion to 2025–26 Kategoria e Parë
3	Sopoti	22	16	3	3	46	20	+26	51	Play-off promotion to 2025–26 Kategoria e Parë
4	Tërbuni	22	11	5	6	39	28	+11	38	Play-off promotion to 2025–26 Kategoria e Parë
5	Veleçiku	22	10	4	8	38	26	+12	34	Play-off promotion to 2025–26 Kategoria e Parë
6	Besëlidhja	22	10	4	8	31	29	+2	34	
7	Albanët	22	7	3	12	48	48	0	24	
8	Naftëtari	22	6	4	12	29	31	−2	22	
9	Adriatiku	22	6	4	12	34	44	−10	22	
10	Basania	22	5	6	11	24	39	−15	21	
11	Gramshi (O)	22	3	5	14	27	50	−23	14	Play-off relegation to 2025–26 Kategoria e Tretë
12	Murlani (R)	22	0	1	21	10	92	−82	1	Relegation to 2025–26 Kategoria e Tretë

Rules for classification: 1) points; 2) head-to-head points; 3) head-to-head goal difference; 4) goal difference; 5) number of goals scored; 6) draw. (Head-to-head record is applied for clubs with the same number of points only once all matches between said clubs have been played.)
(C) Champions; (O) Play-off winners; (P) Promoted; (R) Relegated

==== Results ====
Home \ Away	ADR	ALB	BAS	BES	GRA	ILI	LUZ	MUR	NAF	SOP	TËR	VEL
Adriatiku	—	2–1	3–1	1–2	2–1	0–4	0–4	4–0	2–2	1–2	3–3	1–3
Albanët	3–3	—	6–0	4–1	5–2	2–4	1–7	7–0	3–1	2–3	2–2	2–1
Basania	0–1	3–2	—	1–2	3–0	0–1	3–3	0–0	1–0	1–1	1–1	0–1
Besëlidhja	2–0	3–1	1–1	—	2–0	0–2	0–2	5–0	1–0	1–1	3–1	1–1
Gramshi	1–1	1–1	2–3	2–1	—	1–1	0–1	10–1	0–5	0–0	1–2	0–3
Iliria	2–0	2–0	3–0	2–0	3–0	—	1–1	8–2	4–1	2–0	3–0	1–0
Luzi 2008	3–1	1–0	3–0	3–1	4–3	0–2	—	7–0	2–1	0–1	1–0	3–1
Murlani	3–8	0–3	0–3	0–3	1–2	0–4	0–2	—	0–2	0–2	1–3	0–4
Naftëtari	3–0	3–1	3–2	0–1	0–0	1–2	0–1	1–0	—	0–1	2–2	2–2
Sopoti	1–0	4–0	3–1	4–1	3–0	2–1	1–2	4–0	2–1	—	4–3	2–0
Tërbuni	2–1	2–1	3–0	3–0	5–0	0–0	0–1	2–1	2–0	1–3	—	1–0
Veleçiku	1–0	3–1	0–0	0–0	3–1	2–4	0–2	8–1	2–1	3–2	0–1	—

Legend: Blue = home team win; Yellow = draw; Red = away team win.
For upcoming matches, an "a" indicates there is an article about the rivalry between the two participants.

=== Group B ===
Pos	Team	Pld	W	D	L	GF	GA	GD	Pts	Promotion or relegation
1	Luftëtari (P)	20	16	3	1	56	11	+45	51	Promotion to 2025–26 Kategoria e Parë
2	Oriku	20	16	3	1	37	5	+32	51	Play-off promotion to 2025–26 Kategoria e Parë
3	Tomori	20	11	2	7	39	21	+18	35	Play-off promotion to 2025–26 Kategoria e Parë
4	Devolli	20	10	4	6	39	38	+1	34	Play-off promotion to 2025–26 Kategoria e Parë
5	Butrinti	20	10	3	7	35	19	+16	33	Play-off promotion to 2025–26 Kategoria e Parë
6	Delvina	20	7	5	8	32	31	+1	26	
7	Shkumbini	20	5	5	10	24	38	−14	20	
8	Maliqi	20	6	2	12	27	38	−11	20	
9	Këlcyra	20	5	5	10	28	40	−12	20	
10	Turbina (R)	20	6	1	13	22	34	−12	19	Play-off relegation to 2025–26 Kategoria e Tretë
11	Memaliaj (R)	20	1	1	18	15	79	−64	4	Relegation to 2025–26 Kategoria e Tretë

Rules for classification: 1) points; 2) head-to-head points; 3) head-to-head goal difference; 4) goal difference; 5) number of goals scored; 6) draw. (Head-to-head record is applied for clubs with the same number of points only once all matches between said clubs have been played.)
(P) Promoted; (R) Relegated

==== Results ====
Home \ Away	BUT	DEL	DEV	KËL	LUF	MAL	MEM	ORI	SHK	TOM	TUR
Butrinti	—	2–1	4–0	3–0	3–4	4–1	6–0	0–0	0–0	1–3	2–0
Delvina	2–0	—	1–2	2–2	0–0	1–0	3–1	0–2	4–3	1–0	3–0
Devolli	0–0	2–2	—	5–1	1–4	3–2	5–1	2–1	2–1	2–1	1–0
Këlcyra	2–1	2–2	4–3	—	0–5	0–1	6–0	0–2	0–2	0–0	2–1
Luftëtari	2–1	2–1	4–1	2–0	—	6–1	5–1	0–0	6–1	1–0	4–0
Maliqi	0–2	2–2	1–2	4–2	1–0	—	5–0	0–1	0–0	1–5	2–1
Memaliaj	0–3	2–5	1–3	3–2	0–5	1–2	—	0–7	0–3	1–4	0–3
Oriku	1–0	1–0	4–0	2–1	0–0	1–0	4–1	—	1–0	4–0	2–0
Shkumbini	0–1	2–1	2–2	1–1	0–4	1–0	2–2	1–2	—	0–3	1–3
Tomori	2–0	3–0	2–1	1–1	0–1	4–3	4–0	0–1	4–1	—	3–0
Turbina	1–2	3–1	2–2	0–2	0–1	2–1	2–1	0–1	2–3	2–0	—

Legend: Blue = home team win; Yellow = draw; Red = away team win.
For upcoming matches, an "a" indicates there is an article about the rivalry between the two participants.

== Final ==
13 April 2025
15:00

Iliria	1−0	Luftëtari
Selmani 90'

Loni Papuçiu Stadium, Fier
Referee: Kreshnik Cjapi

== Group A Promotion play-offs ==
Semi-finals
Luzi 2008	2
Veleçiku	0
Sopoti	2
Tërbuni	0

Final
Luzi 2008	4
Sopoti	0

== Semi-finals ==
12 April 2025
15:00

Luzi 2008	2−0	Veleçiku
Jakubu 50'; Morina 79'

Luz i Vogël Stadium, Luz i Vogël
Referee: Klodian Shahini

12 April 2025
15:00

Sopoti	2−0	Tërbuni
Aminu 28'; Mici 52' (pen.)

Sopoti Stadium, Librazhd

== Final ==
19 April 2025
15:00

Luzi 2008	4−0	Sopoti
Balla 16' (pen.); Morina 36', 49'; Ruçaj 66'

Arena e Demave, Tirana
Referee: Laver Alla

Luzi 2008 qualified to the final play-off match.

== Group B Promotion play-offs ==
Semi-finals
Oriku	1
Butrinti	1
Tomori	2
Devolli	1

Final
Oriku	3
Tomori	2

== Semi-finals ==
12 April 2025
15:00

Oriku	1−1	Butrinti
Leshi 89'		Córdoba 75'

Orikum Stadium, Orikum
Referee: Albano Stolaj

Oriku qualified to the final as the team with the better ranking.

12 April 2025
15:00

Tomori	2−1	Devolli
Saraçi 14'; Biaye 31'		Ivani 19' (pen.)

Tomori Stadium, Berat
Referee: Ardit Merdanaj

== Final ==
19 April 2025
15:00

Oriku	3−2	Tomori
Dalanaj 16' (pen.), 27'; Nwatsock A Ekoro 72'		Arbri 54'; Ngene 88'

Vora Stadium, Vorë
Referee: Silvio Dyrmishi

Oriku qualified to the final play-off match.

== Relegation play-offs ==
14 April 2025
15:00

Gramshi	1−1 (a.e.t.)	Turbina
Baku 59' (pen.)		Gjoka 7'
Penalties
Goga (penalty scored); Topalli (penalty missed); Yameogo (penalty missed); Dedja (penalty scored); Agbattou (penalty scored); Lice (penalty scored); Shehi (penalty scored)	5−4	(penalty missed) Dhimitri; (penalty scored) Amos; (penalty scored) Arbana; (penalty missed) Mathias; (penalty scored) Kovaçi; (penalty scored) Ageja; (penalty missed) Merkaj

Flamurtari Stadium, Vlorë
Referee: Mikele Dyrmishi

20 April 2025
15:00

Turbina	0−3	Partizani B
		Jatta 15'; Contreras 76', 87'

Elbasan Arena, Elbasan
Referee: Klodian Shahini

Turbina was relegated to the Kategoria e Tretë, while Partizani B was promoted to the Kategoria e Dytë.

== Top scorers ==
Rank	Player	Club	Goals
1	(Albania) Adhurim Hasani	Adriatiku	19
2	(Albania) Brajan Shekaj	Veleçiku	15
2	(Albania) Herdi Balla	Luzi 2008	15
2	(Albania) Nimet Spahiu	Albanët	15
5	(Albania) Ardit Ziaj	Luftëtari	12
6	(Guinea) Mamady Oulare	Tomori	11
