= 2022–23 Kategoria e Tretë =

Kategoria e Tretë
- Season: 2022–23
- Champions: Adriatiku; 1st title
- Promoted: Adriatiku; Albanët; Këlcyra
- Matches: 99
- Goals: 490 (4.95 per match)
- Top goalscorer: Adhurim Hasani (23 goals)
- Biggest home win: Albanët 7−0 Spartak (5 May 2023); Kinostudio 10−3 Spartak (19 December 2022)
- Biggest away win: Minatori 0−9 Kinostudio (17 February 2023)
- Highest scoring: Kinostudio 10−3 Spartak (19 December 2022)
- Longest winning run: 9 matches Albanët
- Longest unbeaten run: 11 matches Albanët
- Longest winless run: 15 matches Minatori
- Longest losing run: 15 matches Minatori

The 2022–23 Kategoria e Tretë was the 20th official season of the Albanian football fourth division since its establishment. The season began on 24 November 2022 and ended on 25 May 2023. There were 13 teams competing this season, split in 2 groups. Adriatiku, Albanët and Këlcyra gained promotion to the 2023–24 Kategoria e Dytë.

== Changes from last season ==
=== Team changes ===
==== From Kategoria e Tretë ====
Promoted to Kategoria e Dytë:

- Delvina
- Elbasani
- Valbona

==== To Kategoria e Tretë ====
Relegated from Kategoria e Dytë:

- Gramozi
- Këlcyra
- Klosi
- Përmeti
2022–23 Kategoria e Tretë teams:
Group A; Group B

=== Stadia by capacity and locations ===
==== Group A ====
Team	Location	Stadium	Capacity
Adriatiku	Durrës		
Basania	Bushat	Basania Stadium	
Çerma	Tërbuf		
Klosi	Klos		
Përmeti	Përmet	Durim Qypi Stadium	2,000
Skrapari	Çorovodë	Skrapar Sports Field	1,500

==== Group B ====
Team	Location	Stadium	Capacity
Albanët	Tirana		
Drini	Zdojan		
Gramozi	Ersekë	Ersekë Stadium	2,000
Këlcyra	Këlcyrë	Këlcyrë Stadium	1,000
Kinostudio	Tirana		
Minatori	Bulqizë		
Spartak Tirana	Tirana	Marko Boçari Stadium	

== League standings ==
=== Group A ===
Pos	Team	Pld	W	D	L	GF	GA	GD	Pts	Promotion
1	Adriatiku (C, P)	15	10	3	2	60	21	+39	33	Promotion to 2023–24 Kategoria e Dytë
2	Përmeti	15	9	2	4	35	29	+6	29	Play-off promotion to 2023–24 Kategoria e Dytë
3	Klosi	15	9	1	5	26	26	0	28	
4	Basania	15	4	3	8	34	35	−1	15	
5	Çerma	15	4	2	9	25	35	−10	14	
6	Skrapari	15	3	1	11	21	55	−34	10	

Rules for classification: 1) points; 2) head-to-head points; 3) head-to-head goal difference; 4) goal difference; 5) number of goals scored; 6) draw. (Head-to-head record is applied for clubs with the same number of points only once all matches between said clubs have been played.)
(C) Champions; (P) Promoted

=== Results ===
Home \ Away	ADR	BAS	ÇER	KLO	PËR	SKR
Adriatiku	—	4–3	2–4	2–2	1–2	6–1
Basania	1–6	—	2–2	2–3	2–3	5–2
Çerma	0–4	1–1	—	0–2	4–1	1–2
Klosi	1–5	1–0	0–3	—	1–3	5–3
Përmeti	2–2	2–3	2–1	2–1	—	5–2
Skrapari	1–6	2–0	2–1	0–1	0–0	—

Legend: Blue = home team win; Yellow = draw; Red = away team win.
For upcoming matches, an "a" indicates there is an article about the rivalry between the two participants.

Home \ Away	ADR	BAS	ÇER	KLO	PËR	SKR
Adriatiku	—	2–2	7–1	2–0	—	—
Basania	—	—	—	—	1–3	8–2
Çerma	—	0–3	—	0–1	4–6	—
Klosi	—	2–1	—	—	—	4–2
Përmeti	0–4	—	—	1–2	—	3–1
Skrapari	1–7	—	0–3	—	—	—

Legend: Blue = home team win; Yellow = draw; Red = away team win.
For upcoming matches, an "a" indicates there is an article about the rivalry between the two participants.

=== Group B ===
Pos	Team	Pld	W	D	L	GF	GA	GD	Pts	Promotion
1	Albanët (P)	18	14	1	3	59	20	+39	43	Promotion to 2023–24 Kategoria e Dytë
2	Këlcyra (O, P)	18	13	3	2	54	22	+32	42	Play-off promotion to 2023–24 Kategoria e Dytë
3	Gramozi	18	12	2	4	42	20	+22	38	
4	Kinostudio	18	10	2	6	56	35	+21	32	
5	Spartak Tirana (Note: Spartak Tirana were deducted 3 points after fielding an ineligible player in a match against Minatori.)	18	4	1	13	29	60	−31	10	
6	Drini (Note: Drini were deducted 3 points after fielding an ineligible player in a match against Minatori.)	18	3	1	14	34	58	−24	7	
7	Minatori (Note: Minatori withdrew from the competition after the 14th round.)	18	2	0	16	16	75	−59	6	Withdrawn

Rules for classification: 1) points; 2) head-to-head points; 3) head-to-head goal difference; 4) goal difference; 5) number of goals scored; 6) draw. (Head-to-head record is applied for clubs with the same number of points only once all matches between said clubs have been played.)
(O) Play-off winners; (P) Promoted

=== Results ===
Home \ Away	ALB	DRI	GRA	KËL	KIN	MIN	SPA
Albanët	—	4–0	2–1	3–3	2–0	4–0	3–1
Drini	1–3	—	1–4	4–5	2–3	0–3	1–5
Gramozi	0–2	1–0	—	0–0	2–1	3–0	4–0
Këlcyra	0–1	6–3	0–1	—	2–1	4–0	4–1
Kinostudio	2–1	4–3	2–2	1–1	—	4–0	10–3
Minatori	2–4	2–7	0–3	2–7	0–9	—	1–7
Spartak Tirana	1–5	3–3	1–3	0–3	0–4	0–3	—

Legend: Blue = home team win; Yellow = draw; Red = away team win.
For upcoming matches, an "a" indicates there is an article about the rivalry between the two participants.

Home \ Away	ALB	DRI	GRA	KËL	KIN	MIN	SPA
Albanët	—	3–0	—	2–4	—	—	7–0
Drini	—	—	4–2	—	1–5	3–1	—
Gramozi	2–1	—	—	1–2	—	—	3–1
Këlcyra	—	2–1	—	—	5–0	3–0	—
Kinostudio	1–4	—	3–7	—	—	3–0	—
Minatori	2–8	—	0–3	—	—	—	0–3
Spartak Tirana	—	2–0	—	1–3	0–3	—	—

Legend: Blue = home team win; Yellow = draw; Red = away team win.
For upcoming matches, an "a" indicates there is an article about the rivalry between the two participants.

== Final ==
28 May 2023
17:00

Adriatiku	2−0	Albanët
Mala 80', 84'

Shtëpia e Futbollit, Tirana

== Promotion play-off ==
28 May 2023
13:30

Përmeti	0−2	Këlcyra
		Shele 71'; Hasa 73'

National Sports Centre, Kamëz

Këlcyra qualified to the final play-off match.

=== Top scorers ===
Rank	Player	Club	Goals
1	(Albania) Adhurim Hasani	Adriatiku	23
2	(Albania) Enklejd Fuçija	Adriatiku	19
3	(Albania) Klejti Mahmutaj	Albanët	13
4	(Albania) Alsed Abdija	Basania & AM	12
5	(Albania) Haki Shele	Këlcyra	11
5	(Albania) Shyqyri Hasa	Këlcyra	11
