= 2018–19 Kategoria e Dytë =

Kategoria e Dytë
- Season: 2018–19
- Champions: Tërbuni; 4th title
- Promoted: Devolli; Tërbuni; Shkumbini
- Matches: 315
- Goals: 990 (3.14 per match)
- Biggest home win: Devolli 8−0 Gramozi (9 December 2018)
- Biggest away win: Ada 0−5 Spartaku (3 March 2019); Tirana B 2−7 Vllaznia B (16 December 2018)
- Highest scoring: Memaliaj 6−4 Këlcyra (12 May 2019); Sopoti 8−2 Ada (25 November 2018); Spartaku 8−2 Vllaznia B (13 April 2019); Tërbuni 8−2 Ada (6 April 2019)
- Longest winning run: 11 matches Devolli
- Longest unbeaten run: 26 matches Devolli
- Longest winless run: 13 matches Përmeti
- Longest losing run: 12 matches Kukësi B

The 2018-19 Kategoria e Dytë was the 49th official season of the Albanian football third division since its establishment. There were 27 teams competing this season, split in 2 groups. The winners of the groups played the league's final against each other and also gained promotion to the 2019-20 Kategoria e Parë. The runners-up qualified to the play-off round which they played against the 9th ranked teams in the 2018-19 Kategoria e Parë. Devolli and Tërbuni were promoted to the 2019-20 Kategoria e Parë. Tërbuni won their fourth Kategoria e Dytë title after beating Devolli in the final match.

== Changes from last season ==
=== Team changes ===
==== From Kategoria e Dytë ====
Promoted to Kategoria e Parë:

- Elbasani
- Oriku
- Veleçiku
- Vora

Relegated to Kategoria e Tretë:

- Domozdova

==== To Kategoria e Dytë ====
Relegated from Kategoria e Parë:

- Naftëtari
- Shkumbini
- Tërbuni
- Vllaznia B

Promoted from Kategoria e Tretë:

- Term

=== Locations ===
2018–19 Group A Kategoria e Dytë teams.
2018–19 Group B Kategoria e Dytë teams.

=== Stadia by capacity and locations ===
==== Group A ====
Team	Location	Stadium	Capacity
Ada	Velipojë	Adriatik Velipojë	1,200
Gramshi	Gramsh	Mislim Koçi Stadium	1,500
Internacional Tirana	Tirana	Internacional Complex	1,000
Kevitan	Tirana	Kevitan Complex	500
Klosi	Klos		
Kukësi B	Kukës		
Luzi 2008	Luz i Vogël	Luz i Vogël Stadium	600
Partizani B	Tirana	National Sports Centre	50
Sopoti	Librazhd	Sopoti Stadium	3,000
Spartaku	Tirana	Stadiumi Marko Boçari	2,500
Tërbuni	Pukë	Ismail Xhemali Stadium	1,950
Tirana B	Tirana	Skënder Halili Complex	200
Vllaznia B	Shkodër	Reshit Rusi Stadium	1,200

==== Group B ====
Team	Location	Stadium	Capacity
Albpetrol	Patos	Alush Noga Stadium	2,150
Butrinti	Sarandë	Butrinti Stadium	5,000
Delvina	Delvinë	Panajot Pano Stadium	2,500
Devolli	Bilisht	Bilisht Stadium	1,050
Gramozi	Ersekë	Ersekë Stadium	2,000
Këlcyra	Këlcyrë	Fusha Sportive Këlcyrë	1,000
Maliqi	Maliq	Jovan Asko Stadium	1,500
Memaliaj	Memaliaj	Karafil Caushi Stadium	1,500
Naftëtari	Kuçovë	Bashkim Sulejmani Stadium	5,000
Përmeti	Përmet	Durim Qypi Stadium	4,000
Shkumbini	Peqin	Shkumbini Stadium	9,000
Skrapari	Çorovodë	Skrapar Sports Field	1,500
Term	Tirana		
Tepelena	Tepelenë	Sabaudin Shehu Stadium	2,000

== League standings ==
=== Group A ===
Pos	Team	Pld	W	D	L	GF	GA	GD	Pts	Promotion or relegation
1	Tërbuni (C, P)	22	15	5	2	52	19	+33	50	Promotion to 2019–20 Kategoria e Parë
2	Luzi 2008	22	14	5	3	44	15	+29	47	Play-off promotion to 2019–20 Kategoria e Parë
3	Gramshi	22	14	4	4	41	21	+20	46	
4	Partizani B	22	12	7	3	45	26	+19	43	
5	Sopoti	22	12	5	5	51	25	+26	41	
6	Spartaku	22	11	4	7	43	26	+17	37	
7	Vllaznia B	22	10	3	9	44	43	+1	33	
8	Klosi	22	6	4	12	27	35	−8	22	
9	Tirana B (Note: Tirana B were deducted 3 points after failing to show up in a match against Tërbuni.)	22	7	1	14	30	52	−22	19	
10	Ada	22	4	3	15	29	65	−36	15	
11	Internacional Tirana	22	2	3	17	14	46	−32	9	
12	Kukësi B (Note: Kukësi B were deducted 3 points after failing to show up in a match against Klosi.)	22	3	0	19	17	64	−47	6	
13	Kevitan (Note: Kevitan withdrew from the league during the season.) (R)	0	0	0	0	0	0	0	0	Relegation to 2020 Kategoria e Tretë

Source: Soccerway
Rules for classification: 1) points; 2) goal difference; 3) number of goals scored; 4) head-to-head points; 5) head-to-head goal difference; 6) draw. (Head-to-head record is applied for clubs with the same number of points only once all matches between said clubs have been played.)
(C) Champions; (P) Promoted; (R) Relegated

=== Group B ===
Pos	Team	Pld	W	D	L	GF	GA	GD	Pts	Promotion or relegation
1	Devolli (P)	26	21	5	0	59	14	+45	68	Promotion to 2019–20 Kategoria e Parë
2	Shkumbini (O, P)	26	21	4	1	55	13	+42	67	Play-off promotion to 2019–20 Kategoria e Parë
3	Albpetrol	26	18	1	7	48	23	+25	55	
4	Maliqi	26	16	4	6	53	28	+25	52	
5	Këlcyra	26	13	2	11	43	40	+3	41	
6	Memaliaj	26	12	1	13	51	48	+3	37	
7	Butrinti	26	10	3	13	48	40	+8	33	
8	Delvina	26	9	3	14	34	55	−21	30	
9	Skrapari	26	9	3	14	24	37	−13	30	
10	Tepelena	26	9	3	14	34	46	−12	30	
11	Naftëtari	26	8	1	17	29	43	−14	25	
12	Gramozi	26	7	3	16	28	52	−24	24	
13	Përmeti	26	5	5	16	22	45	−23	20	
14	Term (Note: Term withdrew from the league during the season and were deducted 6 points.) (R)	26	4	2	20	23	67	−44	8	Relegation to 2020 Kategoria e Tretë

Source: Soccerway
Rules for classification: 1) points; 2) goal difference; 3) number of goals scored; 4) head-to-head points; 5) head-to-head goal difference; 6) draw. (Head-to-head record is applied for clubs with the same number of points only once all matches between said clubs have been played.)
(O) Play-off winners; (P) Promoted; (R) Relegated

== Final ==
22 May 2019
16:00

Tërbuni	1−1 (a.e.t.)	Devolli
Metani 90+3'	Report	Nallbati 65'
Penalties
Dodaj (penalty scored); Metani (penalty scored); Mezini (penalty scored); Merdini (penalty scored)	4−1	(penalty missed) Cane; (penalty missed) Fifo; (penalty scored) Avdillari

Tofik Jashari Stadium, Shijak
Referee: Emirion Sino
