= 2009–10 Kategoria e Parë =

Kategoria e Parë
- Season: 2009–10
- Champions: Bylis
- Promoted: Bylis; Elbasani
- Relegated: Turbina; Sopoti; Memaliaj; Skrapari

The 2009–10 Kategoria e Parë was the 63rd season of a second-tier association football league in Albania.

== Stadia and location ==
Club	Town	Stadium
Ada	Velipojë	Kompleks Sportiv Zmijani
Bylis	Ballsh	Adush Muça Stadium
Besëlidhja	Lezhë	Brian Filipi Stadium
Bilisht Sport	Bilisht	Bilisht Stadium
Burreli	Burrel	Liri Ballabani Stadium
Elbasani	Elbasan	Rudi Bizhuta Stadium
Gramshi	Gramsh	Mislim Koçi Stadium
Kamza	Kamëz	Kamëz Stadium
Luftëtari	Gjirokastër	Gjirokastra Stadium
Lushnja	Lushnjë	Abdurrahman Roza Haxhiu Stadium
Memaliaj	Memaliaj	Karafil Caushi Stadium
Partizani	Tirana	Selman Stërmasi Stadium
Pogradeci	Pogradec	Gjorgji Kyçyku Stadium
Skrapari	Çorovodë	Skrapar Sports Field
Sopoti	Librazhd	Sopoti Stadium
Turbina	Cërrik	Nexhip Trungu Stadium

== League table ==
Pos	Team	Pld	W	D	L	GF	GA	GD	Pts	Promotion or relegation
1	Bylis (C, P)	30	22	3	5	57	26	+31	69	Promotion to 2010–11 Kategoria Superiore
2	Elbasani (P)	30	19	5	6	56	25	+31	62	Promotion to 2010–11 Kategoria Superiore
3	Kamza	30	19	5	6	50	21	+29	62	Play-off promotion to 2010–11 Kategoria Superiore
4	Lushnja	30	17	9	4	59	10	+49	60	Play-off promotion to 2010–11 Kategoria Superiore
5	Partizani	30	17	6	7	49	35	+14	57	
6	Pogradeci	30	14	6	10	40	39	+1	48	
7	Ada	30	13	3	14	46	34	+12	42	
8	Besëlidhja	30	10	6	14	38	45	−7	36	
9	Luftëtari	30	9	8	13	32	40	−8	35	
10	Gramshi	30	8	8	14	23	34	−11	32	
11	Bilisht Sport	30	9	5	16	30	50	−20	32	
12	Burreli	30	7	10	13	26	41	−15	31	
13	Skrapari (R)	30	9	4	17	29	56	−27	31	Play-out relegation to 2010–11 Kategoria e Dytë
14	Memaliaj (R)	30	7	8	15	23	37	−14	29	Play-out relegation to 2010–11 Kategoria e Dytë
15	Turbina (R)	30	7	7	16	35	53	−18	28	Relegation to 2010–11 Kategoria e Dytë
16	Sopoti (R)	30	5	3	22	14	61	−47	15 (Note: Sopoti were deducted three points for attacking a referee.)	Relegation to 2010–11 Kategoria e Dytë

Source: Soccerway
Rules for classification: 1) points; 2) goal difference; 3) number of goals scored; 4) head-to-head points; 5) head-to-head goal difference; 6) draw. (Head-to-head record is applied for clubs with the same number of points only once all matches between said clubs have been played.)
(C) Champions; (P) Promoted; (R) Relegated

== Promotion playoffs ==
26 May 2010
15:30

Skënderbeu	1–0	Kamza
Asllani 3'	Report

Ruzhdi Bizhuta Stadium, Elbasan
27 May 2010
15:30

Kastrioti	1–0	Lushnja
Abazaj 2'	Report

Qemal Stafa Stadium, Tirana

== Relegation playoffs ==
23 May 2010

Skrapari	0–1	Tërbuni
	Report	Xhahysa 39'

Selman Stërmasi Stadium, Tirana
23 May 2010

Memaliaj	0–1	Tomori
	Report	Shinko 35'

Qemal Stafa Stadium, Tirana
