= 1991–92 Kategoria e Dytë =

Kategoria e Dytë
- Season: 1991–92
- Champions: Sopoti
- Promoted: Sopoti; Punëtori
- Relegated: Memaliaj; Selenica

The 1991–92 Kategoria e Dytë was the 45th season of a second-tier association football league in Albania.

The 2nd Division 1991/92, after the upheavals of 1991, takes on a new guise. The 24 participating teams are divided into two groups for the regular season, in which they only play the first round. In the second round, each group is split into four groups by geographical areas (North and South) with the teams retaining the points of the first phase: the winners of each group pass to the final knockout phase (from the quarterfinals to the final). Sopoti Librazhd and Punëtori Patos make it to the final, earning promotion to the 1st Division, with the first qualifying division champion on penalties. KF Memaliaj is relegated to the lower divisions, in which KF Selenica will also sink, which, relegated from the 1st Division, will not be accepted in the 2nd Division 1992/93. They will be replaced by two new clubs, the Amaro Divas Tirana and the Iliria Fushë-Krujë.

== First round ==
=== Group A ===
Pos	Team	Pld	W	D	L	GF	GA	GD	Pts
1	Burrel Mat	11	7	2	2	18	8	+10	16
2	Sopoti	11	7	1	3	18	8	+10	15
3	Besëlidhja	11	5	3	3	18	10	+8	13
4	Korabi	11	6	1	4	13	9	+4	13
5	Cërriku	11	6	0	5	15	10	+5	12
6	Shkumbini	11	6	0	5	10	9	+1	12
7	Dajti	11	4	2	5	13	15	−2	10
8	Valbona	11	5	0	6	16	19	−3	10
9	Erzeni	11	4	2	5	8	18	−10	10
10	Kukësi	11	3	2	6	12	17	−5	8
11	Kopliku	11	3	1	7	8	15	−7	7
12	Studenti	11	2	2	7	5	16	−11	6

=== Group B ===
Pos	Team	Pld	W	D	L	GF	GA	GD	Pts
1	Punëtori	11	6	1	4	21	16	+5	13
2	Naftëtari	11	6	0	5	22	16	+6	12
3	Butrinti	11	6	0	5	19	15	+4	12
4	Luftëtari	11	5	2	4	13	10	+3	12
5	Përmeti	11	5	1	5	18	10	+8	11
6	Ballshi	11	5	1	5	11	8	+3	11
7	Skrapari	11	5	1	5	19	19	0	11
8	Poliçani (Note: Poliçani was deducted 1 point.)	11	6	0	5	16	19	−3	11
9	Delvina	11	5	0	6	15	17	−2	10
10	Tepelena	11	4	1	6	15	23	−8	9
11	Gramozi	11	4	1	6	13	22	−9	9
12	Memaliaj (Note: Memaliaj was deducted 2 points.)	11	5	0	6	22	29	−7	8

Notes:

Note: All clubs were qualified to the second round

== Second round ==
=== Northern Groups ===
==== Group A ====
Pos	Team	Pld	W	D	L	GF	GA	GD	Pts	Qualification
1	Burrel Mat (Q)	13	8	2	3	21	10	+11	18	Qualification to the Quarterfinals
2	Cërriku	13	8	0	5	19	12	+7	16	
3	Erzeni	13	4	2	7	9	22	−13	10	

(Q) Qualified for the phase indicated

==== Group B ====
Pos	Team	Pld	W	D	L	GF	GA	GD	Pts	Qualification
1	Sopoti (Q)	13	8	1	4	23	15	+8	17	Qualification to the Quarterfinals
2	Shkumbini	13	7	1	5	16	10	+6	15	
3	Kopliku	13	3	2	8	11	21	−10	8	

(Q) Qualified for the phase indicated

==== Group C ====
Pos	Team	Pld	W	D	L	GF	GA	GD	Pts	Qualification
1	Besëlidhja (Q)	13	7	3	3	24	12	+12	17	Qualification to the Quarterfinals
2	Dajti	13	5	2	6	14	18	−4	12	
3	Kukësi	13	3	2	8	14	21	−7	8	

(Q) Qualified for the phase indicated

==== Group D ====
Pos	Team	Pld	W	D	L	GF	GA	GD	Pts	Qualification
1	Korabi (Q)	13	6	3	4	15	11	+4	15	Qualification to the Quarterfinals
2	Valbona	13	5	1	7	17	21	−4	11	
3	Studenti	13	3	3	7	7	17	−10	9	

(Q) Qualified for the phase indicated

=== Southern Groups ===
==== Group A ====
Pos	Team	Pld	W	D	L	GF	GA	GD	Pts	Qualification
1	Punëtori (Q)	13	7	2	4	23	17	+6	16	Qualification to the Quarterfinals
2	Delvina	12	5	1	6	16	18	−2	11	
3	Poliçani (Note: Poliçani was deducted 1 point.)	12	6	0	6	16	20	−4	11	

(Q) Qualified for the phase indicated

==== Group B ====
Pos	Team	Pld	W	D	L	GF	GA	GD	Pts	Qualification
1	Naftëtari (Q)	12	7	0	5	25	18	+7	14	Qualification to the Quarterfinals
2	Ballshi	12	5	1	6	13	11	+2	11	
3	Tepelena	11	4	1	6	15	23	−8	9	

(Q) Qualified for the phase indicated

==== Group C ====
Pos	Team	Pld	W	D	L	GF	GA	GD	Pts	Qualification
1	Butrinti (Q)	13	8	0	5	23	16	+7	16	Qualification to the Quarterfinals
2	Përmeti	13	6	1	6	21	14	+7	13	
3	Gramozi	13	4	1	8	14	25	−11	9	

(Q) Qualified for the phase indicated

==== Group D ====
Pos	Team	Pld	W	D	L	GF	GA	GD	Pts	Qualification
1	Luftëtari (Q)	13	7	2	4	17	10	+7	16	Qualification to the Quarterfinals
2	Skrapari	13	6	1	6	21	22	−1	13	
3	Memaliaj (Note: Memaliaj was deducted 2 points.)	13	5	0	8	23	33	−10	8	

(Q) Qualified for the phase indicated

== Third round ==
=== Quarterfinals ===
Team 1	Score	Team 2
Sopoti	3–0	Burrel Mat
Korabi	2–0	Besëlidhja
Naftëtari	3–2	Luftëtari
Punëtori	3–0	Butrinti

=== Semifinals ===
Team 1	Score	Team 2
Sopoti	0–0 (3–2 p)	Korabi
Punëtori	1–0	Naftëtari

=== Final ===
Team 1	Score	Team 2
Sopoti	1–1 (3–2 p)	Punëtori

- Sopoti and Punëtori were promoted to 1992–93 National Championship.
