= 2021 Kategoria e Tretë =

Kategoria e Tretë
- Season: 2021
- Champions: Luftëtari; 1st title
- Promoted: Luftëtari; Murlani
- Matches: 30
- Goals: 156 (5.2 per match)
- Biggest home win: Murlani 5−0 Drini (30 April 2021); Luftëtari 6−1 Osumi (25 March 2021)
- Biggest away win: Drini 2−9 Murlani (24 March 2021)
- Highest scoring: Drini 2−9 Murlani (24 March 2021)
- Longest winning run: 8 matches Luftëtari
- Longest unbeaten run: 8 matches Luftëtari
- Longest winless run: 10 matches Drini
- Longest losing run: 10 matches Drini

The 2021 Kategoria e Tretë was the 18th official season of the Albanian football fourth division since its establishment. The season began on 11 March 2021 and ended on 14 May 2021. There are 6 teams competing this season. Luftëtari and Murlani gained promotion to the 2021–22 Kategoria e Dytë. Luftëtari won their first Kategoria e Tretë title.

== Changes from last season ==
=== Team changes ===
==== From Third Division ====
Promoted to Kategoria e Dytë:

- Bulqiza
- Labëria
- Valbona
2021 Kategoria e Tretë teams.

=== Stadia by capacity and locations ===
Team	Location	Stadium	Capacity
Luftëtari	Gjirokastër		
Drini	Peshkopi		
Kinostudio	Tirana		
Murlani	Vau i Dejës		
Osumi	Dimal		
Spartak Tirana	Tirana		

== League standings ==
Pos	Team	Pld	W	D	L	GF	GA	GD	Pts	Promotion
1	Luftëtari (C, P)	10	9	0	1	35	5	+30	27	Promotion to 2021–22 Kategoria e Dytë
2	Murlani (P)	10	7	0	3	33	18	+15	21	Promotion to 2021–22 Kategoria e Dytë
3	Osumi	10	6	0	4	25	19	+6	18	Play-off promotion to 2021–22 Kategoria e Dytë
4	Spartak Tirana	10	5	0	5	28	30	−2	15	
5	Kinostudio	10	3	0	7	25	34	−9	9	
6	Drini	10	0	0	10	10	50	−40	0	

Rules for classification: 1) points; 2) goal difference; 3) number of goals scored; 4) head-to-head points; 5) head-to-head goal difference; 6) draw. (Head-to-head record is applied for clubs with the same number of points only once all matches between said clubs have been played.)
(C) Champions; (P) Promoted

=== Results ===
Home \ Away	DRI	KIN	LUF	MUR	OSU	SPA
Drini	—	1–5	0–4	2–9	0–5	1–6
Kinostudio	5–3	—	2–5	3–4	2–5	3–5
Luftëtari	3–0	4–0	—	1–0	6–1	4–0
Murlani	5–0	2–1	2–1	—	3–1	5–2
Osumi	4–2	0–1	0–3	3–0	—	5–2
Spartak Tirana	4–1	5–3	0–4	4–3	0–1	—

Legend: Blue = home team win; Yellow = draw; Red = away team win.
For upcoming matches, an "a" indicates there is an article about the rivalry between the two participants.
