= 2021–22 Kategoria e Tretë =

Kategoria e Tretë
- Season: 2021–22
- Champions: AF Elbasani; 1st title
- Promoted: AF Elbasani; Valbona; Delvina
- Matches: 56
- Goals: 291 (5.2 per match)
- Top goalscorer: Denis Mici (29 goals)
- Biggest home win: AF Elbasani 11−0 Osumi (1 April 2022)
- Biggest away win: Osumi 0−9 AF Elbasani (2 February 2022)
- Highest scoring: Osumi 5−12 Drini (21 April 2022)
- Longest winning run: 11 matches AF Elbasani
- Longest unbeaten run: 14 matches AF Elbasani
- Longest winless run: 8 matches Osumi
- Longest losing run: 8 matches Osumi

The 2021–22 Kategoria e Tretë was the 19th official season of the Albanian football fourth division since its establishment. The season began on 7 December 2021 and ended in 6 May 2022. There were 8 teams competing this season. AF Elbasani, Delvina and Valbona gained promotion to the 2022–23 Kategoria e Dytë. AF Elbasani won their first Kategoria e Tretë title.

== Changes from last season ==
=== Team changes ===
==== From Kategoria e Tretë ====
Promoted to Kategoria e Dytë:

- Luftëtari
- Murlani

==== To Kategoria e Tretë ====
Relegated from Kategoria e Dytë:

- Delvina
- Skrapari
- Valbona
2021–22 Kategoria e Tretë teams.

=== Stadia by capacity and locations ===
Team	Location	Stadium	Capacity
AF Elbasani	Elbasan	Shefqet Lamçja Complex	
Delvina	Delvinë	Panajot Pano Stadium	2,500
Drini	Zdojan		
Eagle FA	Tirana		
Osumi	Ura Vajgurore		
Skrapari	Çorovodë	Skrapar Sports Field	1,500
Spartak Tirana	Tirana		
Valbona	Bajram Curri	Tropojë Stadium	

== League standings ==
Pos	Team	Pld	W	D	L	GF	GA	GD	Pts	Promotion
1	AF Elbasani (C, P)	14	13	1	0	86	4	+82	40	Promotion to 2022–23 Kategoria e Dytë
2	Valbona (P)	14	11	1	2	42	14	+28	34	Promotion to 2022–23 Kategoria e Dytë
3	Delvina (O, P)	14	10	0	4	40	17	+23	30	Play-off promotion to 2022–23 Kategoria e Dytë
4	Eagle FA	14	7	1	6	30	30	0	22	
5	Skrapari	14	4	4	6	34	39	−5	16	
6	Drini	14	2	2	10	27	64	−37	8	
7	Spartak Tirana (Note: Spartak Tirana were deducted 3 points after fielding an ineligible player against Eagle FA.)	14	2	2	10	13	44	−31	5	
8	Osumi	14	1	1	12	19	79	−60	4	

Rules for classification: 1) points; 2) goal difference; 3) number of goals scored; 4) head-to-head points; 5) head-to-head goal difference; 6) draw. (Head-to-head record is applied for clubs with the same number of points only once all matches between said clubs have been played.)
(C) Champions; (O) Play-off winners; (P) Promoted

=== Results ===
Home \ Away	ELB	DEL	DRI	EAG	OSU	SKR	SPA	VAL
AF Elbasani	—	3–0	9–0	4–0	11–0	8–1	8–0	1–0
Delvina	1–5	—	5–0	0–1	4–2	3–0	2–0	2–1
Drini	0–8	1–6	—	1–5	0–2	2–2	0–0	1–5
Eagle FA	0–8	1–3	3–1	—	2–0	1–1	3–0	1–3
Osumi	0–9	0–4	5–12	2–7	—	2–8	1–4	0–7
Skrapari	1–6	1–2	6–1	5–2	2–2	—	4–4	0–2
Spartak Tirana	0–5	0–7	1–4	0–3	3–2	1–2	—	0–2
Valbona	1–1	2–1	7–4	2–1	6–1	3–1	1–0	—

Legend: Blue = home team win; Yellow = draw; Red = away team win.
For upcoming matches, an "a" indicates there is an article about the rivalry between the two participants.

==== Top scorers ====
Rank	Player	Club	Goals
1	(Albania) Denis Mici	AF Elbasani	29
2	(Albania) Mirel Çota	AF Elbasani	15
3	(Albania) Keli Musta	Delvina	10
4	(Albania) Ergys Xhuti	Drini	9
4	(Albania) Mikel Ferhati	AF Elbasani	9
6	(Albania) Rigers Balliu	Valbona	8
