= Mirel Çota =

Albanian footballer

Personal information
- Full name: Mirel Çota
- Date of birth: 14 May 1988 (age 38)
- Place of birth: Librazhd, Albania
- Height: 1.80 m (5 ft 11 in)
- Position: Striker

Team information
- Current team: AF Elbasani

Youth career
- 2002–2007: Torino

Senior career*
Years	Team	Apps	(Gls)
2007–2008	Teuta	20	(2)
2008–2009	Savona	10	(1)
2009–2012	Teuta	58	(14)
2012–2014	Tirana	44	(6)
2014	Elbasani	16	(3)
2015	Teuta Durrës	17	(2)
2015–2017	Sopoti	46	(18)
2017–2018	Dinamo Tirana	12	(2)
2018	Turbina	12	(6)
2018–2021	Sopoti	62	(40)
2021–	AF Elbasani	13	(15)

International career^{‡}
2004	Albania U17	3	(4)
–	Albania U19	3	(1)
- * Club domestic league appearances and goals as of 6 May 2022 ‡ National team caps and goals as of 5 August 2015

Mirel Çota (born 14 May 1988) is an Albanian professional footballer who plays as a striker for Albanian club AF Elbasani.

== Club career ==
=== Tirana ===
24-year old Çota completed a transfer at Tirana on 12 June 2012 by penning a two-year contract worth €50,000. He made his league debut on 25 August in the opening day of 2012–13 Albanian Superliga versus Tomori Berat, winning a penalty in 30th minute which was scored by Klodian Duro as Tirana won 0–1 at Tomori Stadium. He was replaced in the 68th minute following a collision with the defender Charles Ofoyen which injured his eyebrow which required 8 stitches. He opened his scoring account on 2 September in the second matchday against Shkumbini Peqin, scoring a tap-in after dribbling goalkeeper Elvis Kotorri in an eventual 3–0 home win.

=== Elbasan ===
At end of July 2014, Çota joined newly promoted club Elbasani for an undisclosed fee. Then he went in Struga where his team was doing the pre-season training. He debuted with club in the opening week one 2014–15 Albanian Superliga season on 23 August in a 1–0 loss against the champions of Skënderbeu Korçë. Çota scored his first maiden Elbasani in a 1–5 defeat to his former side Teuta Durrës on 11 September.

On 5 October 2014, he scored the second goal of the season, the opener of a 2–0 win against the fellow relegation strugglers Apolonia Fier for the first three points of the campaign. Later in November, Çota netted the third of the season in a 2–0 away win against Teuta Durrës to lead the team to the second win of the season. He finished the first part of the season by being the team's top goalscorer with 3 goals and left the club during the winter transfer market.

=== Teuta Durrës ===
On 6 January 2015, Çota joined fellow top flight side Teuta Durrës by signing a contract until the end of the season, returning for a third time, also becoming the club's third winter signing. He made his first appearance in the friendly against Tirana for days later, netting in a 2–2 draw. His competitive debut occurred on 25 January in the match against Flamurtari Vlorë, finished in a 2–1 away defeat with Çota scoring his team's only goal (later credited to Vukašin Tomić as an owngoal). The match was dubbed as a "scandal" by Albania media and fixed by AFA. Çota appeared in 17 league games during the second part of the season, scoring twice as Teuta barely avoided relegation.

=== Sopoti Librazhd ===
Çota joined Albanian First Division side Sopoti Librazhd on 1 August 2015 on a free transfer, as the transfer was announced by the club administrator Iridion Bahiti. He was given the shirt with number 9 by the club and become the vice-captain.

He made his debut in team's opening match of the season on 12 September 2015, starting and playing full-90 minutes in a goalless home draw against Shkumbini Peqin. Çota opened his scoring account two weeks later by scoring in the 3–0 win against Butrinti Sarandë, helping the team to get its first win of the season in week three. On 17 October, he scored in a 3–1 win over Turbina Cërrik, which was followed by another two goals during the 2–0 win against Apolonia Fier, taking his tally up to four goals.

On 10 April 2016, Çota scored a brace in the 3–2 away defeat to Lushnja in the matchday 21, reaching double-figures for the first time in his career. He eventually finished the 2015–16 season by scoring 13 times in 23 league appearances, setting a new personal best, as Sopoti barely escaped relegation by finishing 8th in Group B.

He declined during 2016–17 season, scoring only 5 goals in 23 appearances as Sopoti was relegated in Albanian Second Division.

=== Dinamo Tirana ===
On 27 August 2017, Çota completed a transfer to fellow capital team Dinamo Tirana, taking the squad number 9 for the 2017–18 season. He made his Dinamo debut on 17 September in the opening matchday against Besa Kavajë which finished in a 2–0 away loss. His first score-sheet contributions came in his second ever appearance for the club five days later, netting the lone goal against Erzeni Shijak.

Çota left the club in mid-January 2018. He scored only twice in 12 league appearances during his short spell at Blue Submarine.

=== Turbina Cërrik ===
On 17 January 2018, Turbina Cërrik announced they have signed Çota for an undisclosed fee. The 29-year old signed a contract running until the end of 2017–18 season. He enjoyed a fine form during his spell at the club, scoring six times in 12 appearances, including a brace in the 3–1 home win versus Shënkolli.

=== Sopoti Librazhd return ===
On 30 July 2018, it was announced that Çota has returned to his boyhood club Sopoti Librazhd to help them to bouche back to Albanian First Division. He scored a brace in the opening week of championship, a 2–1 home win over Tirana B. His second brace came two weeks later in a 5–3 hammering of Partizani Tirana B. On 4 November, Çota scored a hat-trick in a 14–1 unprecedent win of Sopoti versus Kevitan. He doubled his tally for the season with another brace, this time against Ada Velipojë on 25 November, in another spectacular win (8–2).

=== AF Elbasani ===
On 21 August 2021, Çota signed with newly formed team AF Elbasani.

== International career ==
A former Albania youth international, Çota has represented under-17 and -19. With 4 goals in 3 matches, he is Albania under-17 all-time top scorer.

== Career statistics ==
As of 6 May 2022

Club	Season	League			Cup		Europe		Other		Total	
Club	Season	Division	Apps	Goals	Apps	Goals	Apps	Goals	Apps	Goals	Apps	Goals
Teuta Durrës	2007–08	Albanian Superliga	20	2	0	0	—		—		20	2
Savona	2008–09	Serie D	10	1	0	0	—		—		10	1
Teuta Durrës	2009–10	Albanian Superliga	13	0	4	0	—		—		17	0
Teuta Durrës	2010–11	Albanian Superliga	21	8	2	0	—		—		23	8
Teuta Durrës	2011–12	Albanian Superliga	24	6	5	0	—		—		29	6
Teuta Durrës	Total		58	14	11	0	—		—		69	14
Tirana	2012–13	Albanian Superliga	22	5	4	2	4 (Note: All appearance(s) in UEFA Europa League)	1	1 (Note: Appearance in Albanian Supercup)	0	31	8
Tirana	2013–14	Albanian Superliga	23	1	4	2	—		—		27	3
Tirana	Total		45	6	8	4	4	1	1	0	58	11
Elbasani	2014–15	Albanian Superliga	16	3	2	0	—		—		18	3
Teuta Durrës	2014–15	Albanian Superliga	17	2	0	0	—		—		17	2
Sopoti Librazhd	2015–16	Albanian First Division	23	13	2	0	—		1 (Note: All appearance(s) in Albanian First Division relegation play-offs)	0	26	13
Sopoti Librazhd	2016–17	Albanian First Division	23	5	2	1	—		1	0	26	6
Sopoti Librazhd	Total		46	18	4	1	—		2	0	52	19
Dinamo Tirana	2017–18	Albanian First Division	12	2	0	0	—		—		12	2
Turbina Cërrik	2017–18	Albanian First Division	12	6	0	0	—		—		12	6
Sopoti Librazhd	2018–19	Albanian Second Division	21	18	—		—		—		21	18
Sopoti Librazhd	2019–20	Albanian Second Division	18	7	—		—		—		18	7
Sopoti Librazhd	2020–21	Albanian Second Division	23	15	—		—		—		23	15
Sopoti Librazhd	Total		62	40	—		—		—		62	40
AF Elbasani	2021–22	Albanian Third Division	13	15	—		—		—		13	15
Career total			311	109	25	5	4	1	3	0	343	115

== Honours ==
=== Club ===
Tirana

- Albanian Supercup: 2012

AF Elbasani

- Albanian Third Division: 2021–22
