= 1951 Kategoria e Dytë =

Kategoria e Dytë
- Season: 1951
- Champions: Dinamo Vlorë
- Promoted: Dinamo Vlorë, Puna Shijak, Spartaku Korçë, Puna Lezhë, Spartaku Pogradec (Note: Spartaku Pogradec were promoted based on 'sporting merit' even though they failed to progress past the first round.)

The 1951 Kategoria e Dytë is the eighth season of the second tier of football in Albania. The season started in March and ended in August, and 48 teams competed in three stages, with four teams qualifying for the final group, where Dinamo Vlorë won and Puna Shijak finished as runners up.

== First round ==
=== Group 1 ===
Team	Location
Puna Lezhë	Lezhë
Dinamo Shkodër	Shkodër
Puna Kukësi	Kukës
Puka	Pukë
Spartaku Lezhë	Lezhë

Puna Lezhë won the group and advanced to the next round

=== Group 2 ===
Team	Location
Puna Rubik	Rubik, Mirditë
Puna Burrel	Burrel, Mat, Albania
Puna Peshkopi	Peshkopi, Dibër
Puna Rrëshen	Rrëshen, Mirditë
Spartaku Lezhë	Lezhë

Puna Rubik won the group and advanced to the next round

=== Group 3 ===
Team	Location
Puna Shijak	Shijak
Dinamo Durrës	Durrës
NBSh 8 Nëntori Sukth	Sukth, Durrës
NBSh Ylli Kuq Kamëz	Kamëz
Puna Krujë	Krujë
Spartaku Durrës	Durrës

Puna Shijak won the group and advanced to the next round

=== Group 4 ===
Team	Location
Spartak Tirana	Tirana
Dinamo Elbasan	Elbasan
Puna Librazhd	Librazhd
Puna Peqin	Peqin
Spartaku Elbasan	Elbasan
Spartaku Kavajë	Kavajë
Spartaku Peqin	Peqin

Spartak Tirana won the group and advanced to the next round

=== Group 5 ===
Team	Location
Puna Lushnjë	Lushnjë
Dinamo Qyteti Stalin	Kuçovë
NBSh Lushnjë	Lushnjë
Puna Patos	Patos
Spartaku Berat	Berat
Spartaku Fier	Fier
NBSh Çlirimi	Fier

Puna Lushnjë won the group and advanced to the next round

=== Group 6 ===
Team	Location
Dinamo Vlorë	Vlorë
Puna Himarë	Himarë
Puna Këlcyrë	Këlcyrë
Puna Nartë	Nartë, Devoll
Puna Selenicë	Selenicë
Puna Tepelenë	Tepelenë
Spartaku Vlorë	Vlorë

Dinamo Vlorë won the group and advanced to the next round

=== Group 7 ===
Team	Location
Spartaku Gjirokastër	Gjirokastër
Puna Përmet	Përmet
Puna Sarandë	Sarandë
Spartaku Delvinë	Delvinë
Spartaku Permet	Permet

Spartaku Gjirokastër won the group and advanced to the next round

=== Group 8 ===
Team	Location
Spartaku Korçë	Korçë
Dinamo Korçë	Korçë
Puna Ersekë	Ersekë
Puna Leskovik	Leskovik, Kolonjë
Spartaku Ersekë	Ersekë
Spartaku Pogradec	Pogradec

Spartaku Korçë won the group and advanced to the next round

== Semi-finals ==
=== Group 1 ===
Pos	Team	Pld	W	D	L	GF	GA	GR	Pts	Qualification
1	Puna Lezhë	3	3	0	0	8	2	4.000	6	Qualification to the final group
2	Puna Shijak	3	2	0	1	12	2	6.000	4	Qualification to the final group
3	Spartak Tirana	3	1	0	2	3	7	0.429	2	
4	Puna Rubik	3	0	0	3	3	15	0.200	0	

=== Group 2 ===
Pos	Team	Pld	W	D	L	GF	GA	GR	Pts	Qualification
1	Dinamo Vlorë	3	3	0	0	12	3	4.000	6	Qualification to the final group
2	Spartaku Korçë	3	2	0	1	6	5	1.200	4	Qualification to the final group
3	Puna Lushnjë	3	1	0	2	3	7	0.429	2	
4	Spartaku Gjirokastër	3	0	0	3	2	8	0.250	0	

== Final group ==
Pos	Team	Pld	W	D	L	GF	GA	GR	Pts	Promotion
1	Dinamo Vlorë (P)	6	4	1	1	8	6	1.333	9	Promotion to 1952 National Championship
2	Puna Shijak	6	3	1	2	13	7	1.857	7	
3	Spartaku Korçë	6	2	1	3	9	9	1.000	5	
4	Puna Lezhë	6	1	1	4	6	14	0.429	3	

(P) Promoted
