= 2025–26 Kategoria e Tretë =

Kategoria e Tretë
- Season: 2025–26
- Champions: Vllaznia B 1st title
- Promoted: Albpetrol; Memaliaj; Vllaznia B
- Matches: 143
- Goals: 638 (4.46 per match)
- Top goalscorer: Klajti Halili; Nikolas Karakashi (17 goals each)
- Biggest home win: Vllaznia B 11−0 Rinia EL (28 April 2026)
- Biggest away win: Apolonia B 0−11 Albpetrol (12 April 2026)
- Highest scoring: T-Kamza 10−2 Shkodra (1 March 2026)
- Longest winning run: 8 matches Albpetrol
- Longest unbeaten run: 16 matches Albpetrol; Vllaznia B
- Longest winless run: 13 matches Rinia EL
- Longest losing run: 7 matches Gramozi; Rinia EL

The 2025–26 Kategoria e Tretë was the 23rd official season of the Albanian football fourth division since its establishment. The season began on 18 October 2025 and ended on 8 May 2026. There were 21 teams competing this season, split in 2 groups. Albpetrol, Memaliaj and Vllaznia B gained promotion to the 2026–27 Kategoria e Dytë.

== Changes from last season ==
=== Team changes ===
==== From Kategoria e Tretë ====
Promoted to Kategoria e Dytë:

- Bylis B
- Eagle FA
- Partizani B

==== To Kategoria e Tretë ====
Relegated from Kategoria e Dytë:

- Memaliaj
- Turbina
2025–26 Kategoria e Tretë teams:
Group A; Group B

=== Stadia by capacity and locations ===
==== Group A ====
| Team | Location | Stadium | Capacity |
|---|---|---|---|
| Bulqiza | Bulqizë | Bulqiza Stadium | |
| Dinamo City B | Tirana | Kompleksi Sportiv FC Dinamo | |
| Kamza Sport | Kamëz | Kamza Junior Academy | |
| Klosi | Klos | Fusha Sportive Dali Farruku | |
| Rinia EL | Tirana | Skënderbej Military Academy | |
| Shënkolli | Shënkoll | Shënkolli Stadium | |
| Shkodra | Shkodër | Fusha Sportive KF Shkodra | |
| Tirana B | Tirana | Skënder Halili Complex | |
| T-Kamza | Kamëz | Internacional Complex | 1,000 |
| Vllaznia B | Shkodër | Reshit Rusi Stadium | 1,200 |
| Young Boys | Tirana | National Sports Centre | 50 |

==== Group B ====
| Team | Location | Stadium | Capacity |
|---|---|---|---|
| Albpetrol | Patos | Alush Noga Stadium | 2,150 |
| Apolonia B | Fier | Apolonia Academy | |
| Gramozi | Ersekë | Ersekë Stadium | 2,000 |
| Memaliaj | Memaliaj | Karafil Çaushi Stadium | 1,500 |
| Osumi | Ura Vajgurore | Osumi Stadium | |
| Përmeti | Përmet | Durim Qypi Stadium | 4,000 |
| Skrapari | Çorovodë | Skrapar Sports Field | 1,500 |
| Tepelena | Tepelenë | Sabaudin Shehu Stadium | 2,000 |
| Teuta B | Durrës | | |
| Turbina | Cërrik | Nexhip Trungu Stadium | 6,600 |

== League standings ==
=== Group A ===
| Pos | Team | Pld | W | D | L | GF | GA | GD | Pts | Promotion |
|---|---|---|---|---|---|---|---|---|---|---|
| 1 | Vllaznia B (C, P) | 16 | 14 | 2 | 0 | 76 | 11 | +65 | 44 | Promotion to 2026–27 Kategoria e Dytë |
| 2 | Dinamo City B | 16 | 12 | 2 | 2 | 54 | 8 | +46 | 38 | Play-off promotion to 2026–27 Kategoria e Dytë |
| 3 | Bulqiza | 16 | 9 | 1 | 6 | 40 | 21 | +19 | 28 | |
| 4 | Tirana B | 16 | 8 | 3 | 5 | 53 | 24 | +29 | 27 | |
| 5 | T-Kamza | 16 | 7 | 1 | 8 | 38 | 47 | −9 | 22 | |
| 6 | Shënkolli | 16 | 6 | 0 | 10 | 37 | 50 | −13 | 18 | |
| 7 | Shkodra | 16 | 4 | 4 | 8 | 28 | 59 | −31 | 16 | |
| 8 | Kamza Sport | 16 | 2 | 4 | 10 | 21 | 47 | −26 | 10 | |
| 9 | Rinia EL | 16 | 1 | 1 | 14 | 18 | 98 | −80 | 4 | |
| 10 | Klosi (Note: Klosi withdrew from the competition after the 11th round. Their results were annulled.) | 0 | 0 | 0 | 0 | 0 | 0 | 0 | 0 | Withdrew |
| 11 | Young Boys (Note: Young Boys withdrew from the competition after the 11th round. Their results were annulled.) | 0 | 0 | 0 | 0 | 0 | 0 | 0 | 0 | Withdrew |

Rules for classification: 1) points; 2) head-to-head points; 3) head-to-head goal difference; 4) goal difference; 5) number of goals scored; 6) draw. (Head-to-head record is applied for clubs with the same number of points only once all matches between said clubs have been played.)
(C) Champions; (P) Promoted

=== Results ===
| Home \ Away | BUL | DIN | KAM | RIN | SHË | SHK | TIR | TKA | VLL |
|---|---|---|---|---|---|---|---|---|---|
| Bulqiza | — | 0–2 | 4–0 | 5–0 | 7–0 | 3–0 | 2–1 | 4–0 | 1–4 |
| Dinamo City B | 0–3 | — | 6–0 | 10–0 | 1–0 | 3–0 | 2–1 | 6–0 | 1–1 |
| Kamza Sport | 0–3 | 0–3 | — | 1–1 | 3–0 | 6–1 | 1–1 | 2–3 | 0–2 |
| Rinia EL | 3–5 | 0–10 | 3–1 | — | 1–5 | 2–5 | 1–7 | 1–5 | 2–4 |
| Shënkolli | 1–0 | 1–2 | 3–1 | 6–1 | — | 6–3 | 1–8 | 5–4 | 4–6 |
| Shkodra | 1–1 | 1–0 | 3–3 | 6–0 | 4–2 | — | 0–0 | 1–1 | 0–7 |
| Tirana B | 3–0 | 0–2 | 2–2 | 10–1 | 4–2 | 7–0 | — | 3–2 | 0–5 |
| T-Kamza | 2–1 | 0–5 | 2–1 | 7–2 | 2–1 | 10–2 | 0–6 | — | 0–4 |
| Vllaznia B | 4–1 | 1–1 | 10–0 | 11–0 | 3–0 | 8–1 | 3–0 | 3–0 | — |

Legend: Blue = home team win; Yellow = draw; Red = away team win.
For upcoming matches, an "a" indicates there is an article about the rivalry between the two participants.

=== Group B ===
| Pos | Team | Pld | W | D | L | GF | GA | GD | Pts | Promotion |
|---|---|---|---|---|---|---|---|---|---|---|
| 1 | Albpetrol (P) | 16 | 14 | 2 | 0 | 62 | 6 | +56 | 44 | Promotion to 2026–27 Kategoria e Dytë |
| 2 | Memaliaj (O, P) | 16 | 11 | 1 | 4 | 41 | 24 | +17 | 34 | Play-off promotion to 2026–27 Kategoria e Dytë |
| 3 | Përmeti | 16 | 6 | 5 | 5 | 20 | 18 | +2 | 23 | |
| 4 | Tepelena | 16 | 6 | 3 | 7 | 24 | 27 | −3 | 21 | |
| 5 | Skrapari | 16 | 6 | 2 | 8 | 28 | 31 | −3 | 20 | |
| 6 | Osumi | 16 | 5 | 3 | 8 | 30 | 22 | +8 | 18 | |
| 7 | Apolonia B | 16 | 6 | 0 | 10 | 27 | 64 | −37 | 18 | |
| 8 | Gramozi | 16 | 5 | 1 | 10 | 24 | 42 | −18 | 16 | |
| 9 | Turbina | 16 | 2 | 5 | 9 | 17 | 39 | −22 | 11 | |
| 10 | Teuta B | 0 | 0 | 0 | 0 | 0 | 0 | 0 | 0 | Withdrew |

Rules for classification: 1) points; 2) head-to-head points; 3) head-to-head goal difference; 4) goal difference; 5) number of goals scored; 6) draw. (Head-to-head record is applied for clubs with the same number of points only once all matches between said clubs have been played.)
(O) Play-off winners; (P) Promoted

=== Results ===
| Home \ Away | ALB | APO | GRA | MEM | OSU | PËR | SKR | TEP | TUR |
|---|---|---|---|---|---|---|---|---|---|
| Albpetrol | — | 7–0 | 4–0 | 5–1 | 1–0 | 2–0 | 6–0 | 3–0 | 3–0 |
| Apolonia B | 0–11 | — | 5–1 | 4–2 | 2–1 | 2–4 | 2–9 | 1–2 | 2–0 |
| Gramozi | 0–3 | 5–0 | — | 1–3 | 3–2 | 0–2 | 3–2 | 3–2 | 0–1 |
| Memaliaj | 1–1 | 5–1 | 6–1 | — | 1–0 | 1–2 | 3–0 | 2–1 | 3–1 |
| Osumi | 0–1 | 9–1 | 2–0 | 0–1 | — | 0–0 | 2–1 | 3–1 | 4–4 |
| Përmeti | 1–2 | 3–0 | 1–1 | 2–3 | 3–2 | — | 0–0 | 1–1 | 0–0 |
| Skrapari | 0–3 | 1–2 | 3–0 | 3–2 | 0–3 | 3–0 | — | 2–1 | 0–0 |
| Tepelena | 1–1 | 4–2 | 4–2 | 0–3 | 2–1 | 1–0 | 3–0 | — | 1–1 |
| Turbina | 2–9 | 0–3 | 2–4 | 2–4 | 1–1 | 0–1 | 1–4 | 2–0 | — |

Legend: Blue = home team win; Yellow = draw; Red = away team win.
For upcoming matches, an "a" indicates there is an article about the rivalry between the two participants.

== Final ==
8 May 2026
15:00

| Vllaznia B | 4−2 | Albpetrol |
|---|---|---|
| Papaj 24' (pen.); Zekaj 57'; Naza 60'; Halili 90' | | Hyska 71' (pen.); Gjoni 90+2' (pen.) |

Shtëpia e Futbollit, Tirana
Referee: Erjon Bylykbashi

== Promotion play-off ==
6 May 2026
15:00

| Memaliaj | 5−3 (a.e.t.) | Dinamo City B |
|---|---|---|
| Saraçi 10', 90+3' (pen.); Mirani 52'; Soumahoro 111', 120+4' (pen.) | | Sogani 12'; Metaj 56'; Xhafa 66' |

Luz i Vogël Stadium, Luz i Vogël
Referee: Rigert Zeneli

Memaliaj qualified to the final play-off match.

== Top scorers ==
| Rank | Player | Club | Goals |
|---|---|---|---|
| 1 | (Albania) Klajti Halili | Vllaznia B | 17 |
| 1 | (Albania) Nikolas Karakashi | Osumi | 17 |
| 3 | (Ivory Coast) Mohamed Soumahoro | Memaliaj | 16 |
| 4 | (Albania) Alvaro Farruku | Bulqiza | 13 |
| 5 | (Ghana) Enoch Adjei | Albpetrol | 12 |
| 5 | (Albania) Vladimir Saraçi | Memaliaj | 12 |
