= Stiven Bibo =

Albanian footballer (born 2003)

Personal information
- Full name: Stiven Bibo
- Date of birth: 26 September 2003 (age 23)
- Place of birth: Italy
- Position: Central midfielder

Team information
- Current team: Laçi
- Number: 16

Youth career
- 2011–2014: Ali Demi
- 2014–2017: Dinamo Tirana
- 2019–2021: Internacional Tirana
- 2021–2022: Manresa

Senior career*
Years	Team	Apps	(Gls)
2020–2021	Internacional Tirana	1	(0)
2022	Andorra B	3	(1)
2023–	Laçi	57	(10)

International career^{‡}
2021	Albania U19	10	(1)
2023–	Albania U21	2	(0)
- * Club domestic league appearances and goals as of 1 June 2024 ‡ National team caps and goals as of 15 September 2023

Stiven Bibo (born 26 September 2003) is an Albanian professional footballer who plays as a central midfielder for Albanian club Laçi.

== Career ==
=== Early career ===
Bibo was born in Italy to Albanian parents but his family migrated back to Albania when he was a child, settling in the country's capital, Tirana. He joined local youth club Ali Demi near the city centre of Tirana in 2011 at the age of 8, before joining the academy of another local club Dinamo Tirana in 2014. He would remain at Dinamo Tirana until 2019, which is when he joined the Internacional Tirana academy, where he would remain for two years. Bibo made his senior debut on 15 May 2021 in a 7–1 loss to Iliria, coming on as a half time substitute for Ardit Reci in the penultimate round of the 2020–21 Kategoria e Dytë regular season.

In 2021 he moved to Spain to join the youth team of Manresa in Catalonia, where he featured 6 times for the club's youth team in the regional Preferente Catalana competition, scoring once. Whilst at Manresa, he also featured for Andorra B at senior level in the Segona Catalana is the eighth tier of the Spanish football league system and the second highest league in the autonomous community of Catalonia.

== Career statistics ==
=== Club ===
As of 15 September 2023

Club statistics
Club	Season	League			Cup		Europe (Note: Including continental competitions, such as UEFA Champions League and UEFA Europa League)		Other (Note: Including other competitions, such as Albanian Supercup)		Total	
Club	Season	Division	Apps	Goals	Apps	Goals	Apps	Goals	Apps	Goals	Apps	Goals
Internacional Tirana	2020–21	Kategoria e Dytë	1	0	—		—		—		1	0
Internacional Tirana	Total		1	0	—		—		—		1	0
Andorra B	2021–22	Segona Catalana	3	1	—		—		—		3	1
Andorra B	Total		3	1	—		—		—		3	1
Laçi	2022–23	Kategoria Superiore	7	0	0	0	0	0	—		7	0
Laçi	2023–24	Kategoria Superiore	2	0	0	0	—		—		2	0
Laçi	Total		9	0	0	0	—		—		9	0
Career total			9	0	0	0	0	0	0	0	9	0
