= Ymeraj =

Ymeraj is a surname. Notable people with the surname include:

- Ersil Ymeraj (born 1994), Albanian footballer
- Maldin Ymeraj (born 1995), Albanian footballer
