= Janot Tadjong =

Cameroonian footballer

Personal information
- Date of birth: 27 September 1995 (age 31)
- Place of birth: Cameroon
- Position: Midfielder

Senior career*
Years	Team	Apps	(Gls)
2016/2017	KF Sopoti	4	(0)
2016/17-2017/18	KF Tërbuni	18	(0)
2017/2018	KF Iliria	11	(1)
- * Club domestic league appearances and goals

Janot Tadjong (born 27 September 1995 in Cameroon) is a Cameroonian footballer.

== Career ==
After playing in Thailand, Tadjong decided to play in Albania with the aim of reaching a better European league, joining second division side Sopoti. However, the club suffered financial problems, so were unable to pay him for months. As a result, he had to rely on friends for dinner and the owner of a pizzeria, who supplied sandwiches.

Sopoti and Terbuni were both relegated after Tadjong left them, in 2016-17 and 2017–18, which may have caused other managers in Albania to consider him "bad luck".
