= 1955 Albanian National Championship =

Albanian National Championship
- Season: 1955
- Champions: Dinamo Tirana

The 1955 Albanian National Championship was the eighteenth season of the Albanian National Championship, the top professional league for association football clubs, since its establishment in 1930.

== Overview ==
It was contested by 16 teams, and Dinamo Tirana won the championship.

== League standings ==
Pos	Team	Pld	W	D	L	GF	GA	GR	Pts	Qualification or relegation
1	Dinamo Tirana (C)	30	25	5	0	74	9	8.222	55	Champions
2	Partizani	30	26	3	1	96	15	6.400	55	
3	Puna Tiranë	30	16	5	9	50	35	1.429	37	
4	Dinamo Shkodra	30	13	7	10	46	41	1.122	33	
5	Puna Shkodër	30	11	10	9	30	22	1.364	32	
6	Dinamo Durrësi	30	10	11	9	34	28	1.214	31	
7	Puna Vlorë	30	10	11	9	33	37	0.892	31	
8	Luftëtari i Sh.B.O. "Enver Hoxha"	30	11	9	10	38	46	0.826	31	
9	Puna Korçë	30	10	8	12	37	37	1.000	28	
10	Puna Kavajë	30	8	11	11	37	49	0.755	27	
11	Tekstilisti	30	7	11	12	28	39	0.718	25	
12	Puna Berat	30	8	9	13	34	53	0.642	25	
13	Puna Durrës	30	6	11	13	25	40	0.625	23	
14	Spartaku Tiranë (R)	30	6	10	14	36	46	0.783	22	Relegation to the 1956 Kategoria e Dytë
15	Puna Elbasan (R)	30	5	9	16	20	53	0.377	19	Relegation to the 1956 Kategoria e Dytë
16	Puna Gjirokastër (R)	30	2	2	26	14	82	0.171	6	Relegation to the 1956 Kategoria e Dytë

Source: RSSSF.org
(C) Champions; (R) Relegated

== Results ==
Home \ Away	DID	DIS	DIT	LUF	PAR	BER	DUR	ELB	GJI	KAV	KOR	SHK	TIR	VLO	SPA	TEK
Dinamo Durrësi		2–1	0–1	4–2	0–2	1–1	1–0	5–0	2–0	3–1	0–1	0–0	1–0	2–0	2–0	1–1
Dinamo Shkodra	2–2		0–2	2–0	1–2	2–1	3–1	1–1	5–0	3–1	2–2	3–0	6–0	1–0	2–1	2–1
Dinamo Tirana	1–0	6–0		0–0	2–1	6–0	4–1	3–1	7–0	7–0	3–0	1–0	2–0	1–0	3–0	2–0
Luftëtari "Enver Hoxha"	1–0	1–2	1–1		1–4	0–0	3–3	2–0	3–0	0–0	3–1	2–1	1–1	3–2	1–0	3–1
Partizani	4–2	3–0	1–1	7–0		6–0	4–0	12–0	6–0	3–0	4–1	1–0	3–0	5–1	6–0	4–0
Puna Berat	1–1	2–3	0–0	1–0	0–1		2–2	3–1	3–0	0–0	2–1	1–2	2–3	3–1	3–1	0–2
Puna Durrës	1–1	0–0	0–2	0–0	0–1	1–1		1–2	3–2	0–1	2–0	1–0	2–1	2–0	2–1	0–0
Puna Elbasan	0–0	0–0	0–1	0–1	0–1	1–3	1–0		2–2	1–1	3–1	0–0	1–2	2–0	0–0	2–1
Puna Gjirokastër	0–0	0–1	0–4	1–3	1–2	0–2	1–0	1–0		1–2	0–1	0–2	1–3	0–1	0–4	0–1
Puna Kavajë	1–1	2–1	0–3	2–0	1–1	0–0	6–2	0–0	5–0		2–2	2–1	2–3	2–2	1–1	2–1
Puna Korçë	2–0	1–0	0–1	1–1	0–1	5–0	0–0	2–0	2–0	4–0		1–0	0–1	1–2	1–1	4–1
Puna Shkodër	1–0	2–0	1–1	2–0	0–1	2–0	0–0	2–1	4–0	3–2	2–0		2–0	1–1	1–1	0–0
Puna Tiranë	1–1	4–1	1–2	5–1	1–3	3–0	0–0	4–1	3–0	2–0	3–0	2–0		0–0	2–0	2–0
Puna Vlorë	2–0	2–0	2–3	2–2	1–1	1–0	0–0	1–0	1–0	1–0	2–1	0–0	3–2		2–1	2–2
Spartaku	1–2	1–1	0–2	2–1	0–2	2–2	2–1	3–0	7–2	1–1	1–1	1–1	0–1	1–1		2–0
Tekstilisti	0–0	1–1	0–2	1–2	2–4	5–1	1–0	0–0	3–2	2–0	0–0	0–0	0–0	0–0	2–1	

Source: CalcioMondialeWeb.it
Legend: Blue = home team win; Yellow = draw; Red = away team win.
