= Xibër =

- Administrative unit
- Location within Albania
- Coordinates: 41°27′N 20°2′E
- Country: Albania
- County: Dibër
- Municipality: Klos

Population (2011)
  - Administrative unit: 2,660
- Time zone: UTC+1 (CET)
  - Summer (DST): UTC+2 (CEST)

Xibër is a former municipality in the Dibër County, northern Albania. Following the 2015 local government reform it became a subdivision of the municipality of Klos. The population at the 2011 census was 2,660.

== Demographic history ==
Xibër (Çipur) is recorded in the Ottoman defter of 1467 as village in the timar of Ballaban in the vilayet of Mati. The settlement had a total of six households represented by the following household heads: Todor Bogdani, Shurb Bardi, Benk Kirakesi, Gjergj Palazi, Dom Progoni, and Shirgj Bardi.
