= 1956 Kategoria e Dytë =

Kategoria e Dytë
- Season: 1956
- Champions: Spartaku Tiranë
- Promoted: Spartaku Tiranë
- Relegated: Spartaku Pogradec

The 1956 Kategoria e Dytë was the 11th season of a second-tier association football league in Albania. The season had started in March and ended in August. Even the Second Division begins to take on a fixed formula, moving in 1956 to the seven single-group teams. Spartaku Tiranë wins league and promotion title by outperforming opponents, while Spartaku Pogradec was the first team to officially relegated to the regional divisions, from which Puna Peshkopi was advanced. This season was followed by the 1957 season.

== League table ==
Pos	Team	Pld	W	D	L	GF	GA	GR	Pts	Promotion or relegation
1	Spartaku Tiranë (P)	12	9	3	0	32	13	2.462	21	Promotion to 1957 National Championship
2	Puna Fier	12	5	4	3	31	18	1.722	14	
3	Puna Lushnjë	12	5	4	3	18	19	0.947	14	
4	Puna Elbasan	12	4	2	6	27	19	1.421	10	
5	Spartaku Qyteti Stalin	12	2	5	5	14	20	0.700	9	
6	Puna Gjirokastër	12	1	6	5	10	27	0.370	8	
7	Spartaku Pogradec (R)	12	2	4	6	7	23	0.304	8	Relegation to District Leagues

(P) Promoted; (R) Relegated
