= 1957 Albanian National Championship =

Albanian National Championship
- Season: 1957
- Champions: Partizani

The 1957 Albanian National Championship was the 20th season of the Albanian National Championship, the top professional league for association football clubs, since its establishment in 1930.

== Overview ==
It was contested by 8 teams, and Partizani won the championship.

== League standings ==
Pos	Team	Pld	W	D	L	GF	GA	GR	Pts	Qualification or relegation
1	Partizani (C)	14	10	3	1	28	7	4.000	23	Champions (Note: Partizani and Dinamo Tirana finished the season level on points so the Albanian Football Association decided to organise a championship playoff game to determine the winner of the 1965–66 Albanian National Championship.)
2	Dinamo Tirana	14	11	1	2	33	8	4.125	23	
3	Puna Korçë	14	7	3	4	17	15	1.133	17	
4	Puna Tiranë	14	5	6	3	22	17	1.294	16	
5	Puna Vlorë	14	4	4	6	20	28	0.714	12	
6	Puna Durrës	14	5	1	8	25	23	1.087	11	
7	Puna Kavajë (O)	14	3	2	9	16	35	0.457	8	Qualification for the relegation play-offs
8	Spartaku Tiranë (R)	14	0	2	12	6	34	0.176	2	Relegation to the 1958 Kategoria e Dytë

Source: RSSSF.org
(C) Champions; (O) Play-off winners; (R) Relegated

== Results ==
Home \ Away	DIN	PAR	DUR	KAV	KOR	TIR	VLO	SPA
Dinamo		1–2	3–1	3–0	3–0	3–1	3–0	3–0
Partizani	1–0		2–0	6–2	0–0	2–1	5–1	3–0
Puna Durrës	1–3	0–1		4–0	0–2	5–2	2–2	4–0
Puna Kavajë	0–3	0–4	1–2		1–2	1–1	2–1	3–0
Puna Korçë	0–2	1–0	3–2	2–0		1–1	2–2	2–1
Puna Tiranë	1–1	0–0	2–1	2–0	1–0		2–1	6–0
Puna Vlorë	1–4	1–2	1–0	3–3	2–1	1–1		3–1
Spartaku	0–1	0–0	1–3	2–3	0–1	1–1	0–1	

Source: CalcioMondialeWeb.it
Legend: Blue = home team win; Yellow = draw; Red = away team win.

== Final ==
Played on 3 July 1957 in Tirana.

Team 1	Score	Team 2
Partizani	3–1	Dinamo Tirana

== Relegation/promotion playoff ==
The second team of Second Division played in three matches promotion playoffs with the 7th of the National Championship (all in Tirana).

Team 1	Series	Team 2	Game 1	Game 2	Game 3
Puna Kavajë	7–4	Puna Berat	0–2	3–1	4–1
