= Drini FK 2004 =

Albanian football club

Drini FK
- Full name: Drini Futboll Klub
- Nickname: Drini
- Founded: 6 July 2014; 11 years ago
- Ground: National Sports Centre
- Capacity: 500
- League: Kategoria e Tretë, Group B
- 2022–23: Kategoria e Tretë, Group B, 6th
Home colours	Away colours

Drini FK 2014 is an Albanian football club based in Dibër. The club currently compete in the Kategoria e Tretë, the fourth tier of football in Albania.
