= KF Murlani =

Albanian football club

Murlani
- Full name: Klubi i Futbollit Murlani
- Founded: December 2019; 6 years ago
- Ground: Fusha Sportive Barbullush
- Capacity: 500
- President: Përparim Rraboshta
- Manager: Altin Xhahysa
- League: Kategoria e Tretë
- 2024–25: Kategoria e Dytë, Group A, 12th (relegated)

KF Murlani (Albanian: Klubi i Futbollit Murlani), is an Albanian football club based in Barbullush, Vau i Dejës. Founded in 2019, the club initially operated as a youth football academy before establishing a senior team in 2021. It currently competes in Kategoria e Tretë, the fourth tier of Albanian football. The club plays its home matches at Fusha Sportive Barbullush.

== History ==
KF Murlani was established in 2019 with the objective of promoting football and youth development in the Vau i Dejës area. The creation of the club was supported by the local community and sponsored by Gardenland Resort, under the leadership of club president Përparim Rraboshta. From its inception, the club focused on building a sustainable football program through the efforts of coaches, players and volunteers.

In 2021, Murlani entered a senior team into the Albanian football league system under head coach Altin Xhahysa. During its inaugural season in Kategoria e Tretë, the club finished as runners-up, earning promotion to Kategoria e Dytë.

Alongside its senior side, KF Murlani has invested in youth football, fielding several age-group teams that have participated successfully in regional competitions.

== Honours ==
=== League titles ===
- Kategoria e Tretë
  - Runner Ups (1): 2021
