= KKS Albanët =

Albanian football club

Albanët
- Full name: Klubi Kulturor Sportiv Albanët
- Founded: 1994; 31 years ago
- Ground: Kompleksi Internacional
- Capacity: 1,000
- President: Alban Myftari
- Manager: Blendi Gockaj
- League: Kategoria e Dytë, Group A
- 2024–25: Kategoria e Dytë, Group A, 7th

Klubi Kulturor Sportiv Albanët is an Albanian football club based in Tirana. They compete in Kategoria e Dytë, the third tier of Albanian football, after having achieved promotion from Kategoria e Tretë.

== History ==
In 2020, the club was reformed as a youth sports club for the children of Tirana. During the 2022–23 season, they established a senior team, competing in Kategoria e Tretë. In their first season, they placed first in their respective Group B, gaining promotion to Kategoria e Dytë.

== Players ==
=== List of managers ===
Name nolan hysi	Period
(Albania) Blendi Gockaj	24 November 2022—
