= KF Mirdita =

Albanian football club

- Full name: Klubi i Futbollit Mirdita
- Founded: 1950; 76 years ago
- Dissolved: 2021
- Ground: Mirdita Stadium
- Capacity: Unknown
- Owner: Bashkia Mirditë
- Manager: Orest Jaku
- 2020–21: Kategoria e Dytë, Group A, 13th (relegated)
Home colours	Away colours

KF Mirdita is an Albanian football club based in the municipality of Mirditë. They are currently competing in the Kategoria e Tretë.

== Honours ==
- (Albania) Kategoria e Dytë:
  - Champions (1): 1991–92
- (Albania) Kategoria e Tretë:
  - Champions (1): 2018
