= KF Spartak Tirana =

Albanian football club

- Full name: Klubi i Futbollit Spartak Tirana
- Nickname: Gladiatorët
- Founded: 1950; 76 years ago
- Ground: "Marko Boçari" Stadium
- Capacity: 2,500
- Chairman: Artan Vangjeli
- Manager: Telman Perleka
- League: Kategoria e Tretë, Group B
- 2022–23: Kategoria e Tretë, Group B, 5th
Home colours	Away colours

KF Spartak Tirana (Albanian: KF Spartaku Tiranë) is an Albanian football club based in Tirana. They last competed in Kategoria e Tretë, the fourth tier of Albanian football.

== History ==
The club was established in 1950 as the football team of Albania’s trade unions. Spartak Tirana competed in Kategoria Superiore during the 1954, 1955 and 1957 seasons. Following a nationwide reorganization of Albanian sports clubs between 1959 and 1960, many of the club’s leading players were transferred to 17 Nëntori (now Sportklub Tirana).

Spartak Tirana was dissolved in 1959 and remained inactive for more than five decades before being re-established in 2012. The revival of the club was led by a group of football enthusiasts and historians, including Artan Vangjeli, Telman Perleka, Rezart Sejdini, Leonard Haroku and Gilbert Hysko, with financial backing from IDS Company, owned by Agron Shehaj and Fatmir Lamcja. Since its reformation, the club has competed in Kategoria e Tretë.

== Honours ==
=== Domestic ===
- Albanian First Division
  - Winners (2): 1953, 1956
- Albanian Third Division
  - Winners (1): 2016 - 2017

== Seasons ==
Year	League	Level	Pld	W	D	L	GF	GA	GD	Pts	Position
1951	Kategoria e Dytë	2	3	1	0	2	3	7	−4	2	6th of 8
1953	Kategoria e Dytë	2	13	11	1	1	?	?	?	23	1st of 14; Promoted
1954	National Championship	1	22	4	5	13	26	52	−26	13	11th of 12
1955	National Championship	1	30	6	10	14	36	46	−10	22	14th of 16; Relegated
1956	Kategoria e Dytë	2	12	9	3	0	32	13	+19	21	1st of 7 Promoted
1957	National Championship	1	14	0	2	12	6	34	-28	2	8th of 8 Relegated
2016–17	Kategoria e Tretë - Group A	4	16	15	0	1	62	14	+48	45	1st of 10; Promoted
2017–18	Kategoria e Dytë - Group A	3	24	12	2	10	55	40	+15	38	4th of 14
2018–19	Kategoria e Dytë - Group A	3	22	11	4	7	43	26	+17	37	6th of 13
2019–20	Kategoria e Dytë - Group A	3	22	5	4	10	28	52	-24	19	10th of 12; Withdrawn
2021	Kategoria e Tretë - Group A	4	10	5	0	5	28	30	-2	15	4th of 6
2021–22	Kategoria e Tretë - Group A	4	14	3	2	9	17	44	-27	11	6th of 8

== Notable players ==
- (Albania) Loro Boriçi (1957)
- (Albania) Isuf Borova (1957)

== Notable managers ==
- (Albania) Hivzi Sakiqi (1956)
- (Albania) Loro Boriçi (1957)
- (Albania) Adem Karapici (1953)

== List of managers ==
Name	Nat	From	To	Record				
Name	Nat	From	To	P	W	D	L	Win %
Artan Vangjeli	(Albania)	November 2012	November 2019	106	69	6	31	66%
Telman Perleka	(Albania)	November 2019	Present	-	-	-	-	-

== Sponsorship ==
- Main sponsor: none
- Official shirt manufacturer: Macron

== See also ==
- FK Partizani Tirana
- KF Tirana
- FK Dinamo Tirana
