= Ersil Ymeraj =

Albanian footballer

Personal information
- Date of birth: 6 July 1994 (age 32)
- Place of birth: Shkodër, Albania
- Height: 1.83 m (6 ft 0 in)
- Position: Attacking midfielder

Team information
- Current team: Valbona
- Number: 10

Youth career
- 2010–2013: Vllaznia

Senior career*
Years	Team	Apps	(Gls)
2013–2014	Veleçiku	14	(1)
2014–2018	Kamza	85	(17)
2018–2019	Kastrioti	28	(4)
2019–2020	Laçi	5	(0)
2020	Llapi	15	(9)
2020–2021	Kukësi	15	(0)
2021–2022	Erzeni	27	(12)
2022	Dinamo Tirana	7	(3)
2023–	Valbona		
- * Club domestic league appearances and goals

Ersil Ymeraj (born 6 July 1994) is an Albanian footballer who plays as a midfielder for Valbona.

== Career ==
Ymeraj joined Superliga outfit Laçi in summer 2019 from relegated Kastrioti Krujë. On 17 January 2020, Ymeraj moved to KF Llapi playing in the Football Superleague of Kosovo, on a deal until the end of the season with an option for one further year. After 9 goals and 2 assist in 15 games, the option was triggered and his contract was extended until June 2021.
