= KF Adriatiku 2012 =

Albanian football club

Adriatiku
- Full name: Klubi i Futbollit Adriatiku 2012
- Founded: 2012; 14 years ago
- Capacity: 1,500
- Owner: Shoqata Adriatiku 2012
- League: Kategoria e Tretë
- 2025–26: Kategoria e Dytë, Group A, 10th (relegated)
- Website: https://kfadriatiku.com/

Klubi i Futbollit Adriatiku 2012 is an Albanian professional football club based in Katund i Ri, Durrës. They are currently competing in the Kategoria e Tretë.

== Honours ==
- (Albania) Kategoria e Tretë:
  - Champions (1): 2022–23
