= Redi Maloku Stadium =

Stadium in Fushë-Krujë, Albania

- Interactive map of Redi Maloku Stadium
- Former names: Fushë Krujë Stadium
- Location: Fushë Krujë, Albania
- Coordinates: 41°28′35″N 19°43′28″E
- Owner: KS Iliria
- Capacity: 3,000
- Surface: Grass

Construction
- Opened: 1991
- Renovated: 2012, 2024

Tenant
- KS Iliria

Redi Maloku Stadium is a multi-use stadium in Fushë Krujë, Albania. The stadium has a capacity of 3,000 people and it is mostly used for football matches and it is the home ground of the local club Iliria.
