= Labëria FC =

Albanian football club

- Full name: Labëria Football Club
- Founded: 6 March 2019; 6 years ago
- Ground: Narta Sports Complex
- League: Kategoria e Tretë, Group B
- 2024–25: Kategoria e Tretë, Group B, 5th
Home colours	Away colours

Labëria FC is an Albanian professional football club based in Vlorë County. They are currently competing in Kategoria e Tretë, Group B.

== History ==
FC Labëria was established as an amateur team in 2011 in New York, by two brothers from the village of Kuç, Albanian immigrants who envisioned creating a football team to represent the historic region of Labëria. The amateur branch is concurrently competing in the Cosmpolitan Soccer League, Division 2, for the 2024–25 season.

The club takes its name and inspiration from the Labëria Club of 1908, a patriotic organization that opened the first Albanian school in Vlorë (Muradije School).

The team's ownership has built a modern sports facility in Nartë, providing a training ground for its teams. Through its initiatives, they have offered over 300 children, aged 7–19, from the region an opportunity to grow and learn the game of football.

== Honours ==
- (Albania) Kategoria e Tretë:
  - Champions (1): 2020
