= SK Bulqiza =

Albanian football club

- Full name: Sport Klub Bulqiza
- Founded: 18 February 1964; 62 years ago
- President: Festime Mjeshtri
- Manager: Igli Keta
- League: Kategoria e Tretë, Group A
- 2025–26: Kategoria e Tretë, Group A, 3rd
Home colours	Away colours

Sport Klub Bulqiza is an Albanian professional football club based in Bulqizë. They are currently competing in Kategoria e Tretë, the fourth tier of Albanian football. Their home ground is Bulqiza Stadium.

== History ==
The club was founded in 1964 under the name "Minatori". It was later renamed 18 Shkurti to commemorate the opening of the chrome mine on the outskirts of Bulqizë. After entering national competitions in 1966, the team made its debut in the Albanian Third Division during the 1968–69 season.

The club’s performances improved significantly from 1972 onward under the leadership of coach Sabri Abdiu. In 1978, its youth team achieved notable success in the Albanian Second Division.

18 Shkurti competed regularly in Kategoria e Tretë until 1990, after which it participated intermittently in the Albanian league system until 2013.

In 2019, the club was re-established as the municipal team of Bulqizë with the support of mayor Lefter Alla. It eventually secured promotion to Kategoria e Dytë for the 2020–21 season.
