= Kategoria e Tretë =

- Founded: 2003
- Country: Albania
- Confederation: UEFA
- Number of clubs: 24
- Level on pyramid: 4
- Promotion to: Kategoria e Dytë
- Domestic cup: Albanian Cup
- Current champions: Vllaznia B (2025–26)
- Most championships: Bylis (2)
- Website: Official site
- Current: 2026–27 Kategoria e Tretë

Kategoria e Tretë is the fourth tier of Albania's football league system. A total of 24 teams, split into 2 groups, are competing in the 2026–27 season. The top two teams of each group earn the right to promotion in Kategoria e Dytë and the group winners play a final match to determine the champion. The third-ranked teams qualify for the play-off round.

== Clubs (2026–27) ==
=== Group A ===
Team	Location
Adriatiku	Katund i Ri
Bulqiza	Bulqizë
Dinamo City B	Tirana
Korabi B	Peshkopi
Kukësi B	Kukës
Miloti	Milot
Mirdita	Rrëshen
North United	Shkodër
Shënkolli	Shënkoll
Shkodra	Shkodër
Tirana B	Tirana
T-Kamza	Kamëz

=== Group B ===
Team	Location
Besa Elite	Kavajë
Egnatia B	Rrogozhinë
Gramozi	Ersekë
Kinostudio	Tirana
Lefter Millo	Derviçan
Osumi	Ura Vajgurore
Përmeti	Përmet
Shkumbini	Peqin
Skrapari	Çorovodë
Sopoti B	Librazhd
Tepelena	Tepelenë
Turbina	Cërrik

== Champions ==
Year	Champions	Runners-up	Top scorer	Goals
2003–04	Tërbuni	Butrinti		
2004–05	Këlcyra	Domozdova		
2005–06	Olimpiku Plug	Olimpiku Yrshek		
2006–07	Alfavita	KF Vlora		
2007–08	Bylis			
2008–09	Laçi			
2009–10	Bylis			
2010–11	Pogradeci			
2011–12	Vora	Farka		
2012–13	Partizani B	Oriku		
2013–14	Tirana B	Teuta B		
2014–15	Kevitan	Internacional Tirana		
2015–16	Skënderbeu B	Kukësi B		
2016–17	Spartak Tirana	Klosi		
2018	Rubiku	Term		
2019	Selenica	Mirdita		
2020	Labëria	Bulqiza		
2021	Luftëtari	Murlani		
2021–22	AF Elbasani	Valbona	Denis Mici	29
2022–23	Adriatiku	Albanët	Adhurim Hasani	23
2023–24	Basania	Memaliaj	Kalonji Nyanguila	11
2024–25	Bylis B	Eagle FA	Alatin Ametlli	11
2025–26	Vllaznia B	Albpetrol	Klajti Halili; Nikolas Karakashi	17

== See also ==
- List of football clubs in Albania
