= FK Osumi =

Albanian football club

- Full name: Futboll Klub Osumi
- Founded: 18 August 2018; 7 years ago
- Manager: Sokol Çela
- League: Kategoria e Tretë, Group B
- 2025–26: Kategoria e Tretë, Group B, 6th
Home colours	Away colours

FK Osumi is an Albanian professional football club based in the municipality of Dimal. They are currently competing in Kategoria e Tretë, Group B.

== History ==
Historical records, press archives and oral accounts confirm that the game of football in Ura Vajgurore is believed to have been introduced as early as 1915, a claim supported by sports publication Sporti Shqiptar, Issue No. 10, dated November 28, 1937.

Football quickly became the main sporting activity with matches primarily organized between teams formed within local neighbourhoods.

Some notable players who competed in the 1970s at a national level were Jani Cinari, Mjellaq Nika and Rodolf Komini.

In 2004, Ura Vajgurore’s football team reemerged under the name Osumi to participate in Kategoria e Tretë for the 2004–05 season.

The team's uniform kit featured a white jersey with two horizontal black stripes across the chest, paired with black or white shorts and white socks.
