= Nexhip Trungu Stadium =

Multi-use stadium in Elbasan County, Albania

- Interactive map of Nexhip Trungu Stadium
- Full name: Nexhip Trungu Stadium
- Address: Cërrik; Albania
- Location: Cërrik, Albania
- Coordinates: 41°01′49″N 19°59′38.8″E
- Owner: Turbina Cërrik; Cërrik Municipality
- Operator: Turbina Cërrik
- Capacity: 6,600
- Surface: Natural grass

Tenant
- Turbina Cërrik

Nexhip Trungu Stadium (Albanian: Stadiumi Nexhip Trungu) is a multi-use stadium in Cërrik, Elbasan County, Albania which is used as the home ground of local football club Turbina Cërrik.

In 2015, Turbina Cërrik were promoted to the Albanian First Division, the second tier of Albanian football, and Cërrik Municipality made minor improvements to the stadium which included the installation of 350 new seats in the main stand as well as a renovation of the changing rooms.
