= KF Iliria =

Albanian football club

Iliria
- Full name: Klubi i Futbollit Iliria
- Founded: 10 June 1992; 34 years ago
- Ground: Redi Maloku Stadium
- Capacity: 3,000
- President: Nazmi Selmani
- Manager: Dritan Smajli
- League: Kategoria e Parë
- 2025–26: Kategoria e Parë, 4th
Home colours	Away colours

KF Iliria is an Albanian football club based in Fushë-Krujë. Founded in 1992, the club represents one of the youngest teams in Albanian football and has spent much of its history competing in the country’s lower divisions.

Its greatest success came in the 1994–95 season, when it made its only appearance in the Albanian top league after winning promotion the previous year.

== History ==
Football in Fushë-Krujë dates back to the 1970s through local youth teams, but the town did not have a senior club until the creation of Iliria on 10 June 1992. The club was founded by a group of local football enthusiasts with the aim of representing Fushë-Krujë in the Albanian league system. Kujtim Kaziu became the club’s first head coach after completing coaching courses organized by the Albanian Football Federation. Financial support from local businesses and residents was instrumental in establishing the club during its early years.

Iliria competed in the Albanian Second Division during its first three seasons and quickly emerged as a promotion contender. In May 1994, the club secured a place in the Albanian Superliga by defeating regional rivals Kastrioti in a decisive promotion match.

The club’s only top-flight campaign came in the 1994–95 season. Iliria opened the season with a 1–0 victory over Vllaznia and went on to claim home wins against Teuta, Flamurtari and Luftëtari. Despite these results, the team struggled to maintain consistency throughout the season and finished at the bottom of the table, resulting in immediate relegation.

After returning to the lower divisions, Iliria encountered financial difficulties, particularly following the death of one of its principal benefactors, businessman Abaz Ulliri. The club subsequently alternated between the Second and Third Divisions before gradually rebuilding with support from new sponsors and the Municipality of Fushë-Krujë. By the late 2010s, Iliria had re-established itself as a regular participant in the Albanian First Division.

== Stadium ==
KF Iliria plays its home matches at Redi Maloku Stadium, in Fushë-Krujë. Prior to the club’s establishment, the site consisted of a modest grass pitch. In the early 1990s, it was upgraded with dressing rooms, perimeter fencing and other facilities required for national league competition. The stadium has served as the club’s home venue since its foundation.

== List of managers ==
- (Albania) Fatmir Sala (August 1991 — September 2015)
- (Albania) Pëllumb Ziri (September 2015 — February 2017)
- (Albania) Fatmir Sala (February 2017 — July 2023)
- (Albania) Afrim Deliu (July 2023 — October 2023)
- (Albania) Rrahman Hallaçi (October 2023 — February 2024)
- (Albania) Agim Canaj (February 2024– July 2024)
- (Albania) Bledar Devolli (July 2024– September 2024)
- (Albania) Alfred Allamani (September 2024–October 2024)
- (Albania) Dritan Smajli (October 2024– December 2025)
- (Argentina) Matias Tatangelo (January 2026– June 2026)
- (Albania) Dritan Smajli (June 2026– )

== Honours ==
- Kategoria e Dytë:
  - Champions (2): 2013–14, 2024–25
