= KF Klosi =

Albanian football club

- Full name: Klubi i Futbollit Klosi
- Founded: 1939; 86 years ago
- Ground: Klos, Albania
- League: Kategoria e Tretë, Group A
- 2024–25: Kategoria e Tretë, Group A, 5th
Home colours	Away colours

KF Klosi is an Albanian football club based in Klos. They are currently competing in Kategoria e Tretë, Group A.

== History ==
KF Klosi was founded in 1939 as Shoqëria Sportive Klosi. The club later changed its name to Harkëtari, having played mainly in the lower divisions.
