= Klos (municipality) =

- Municipality
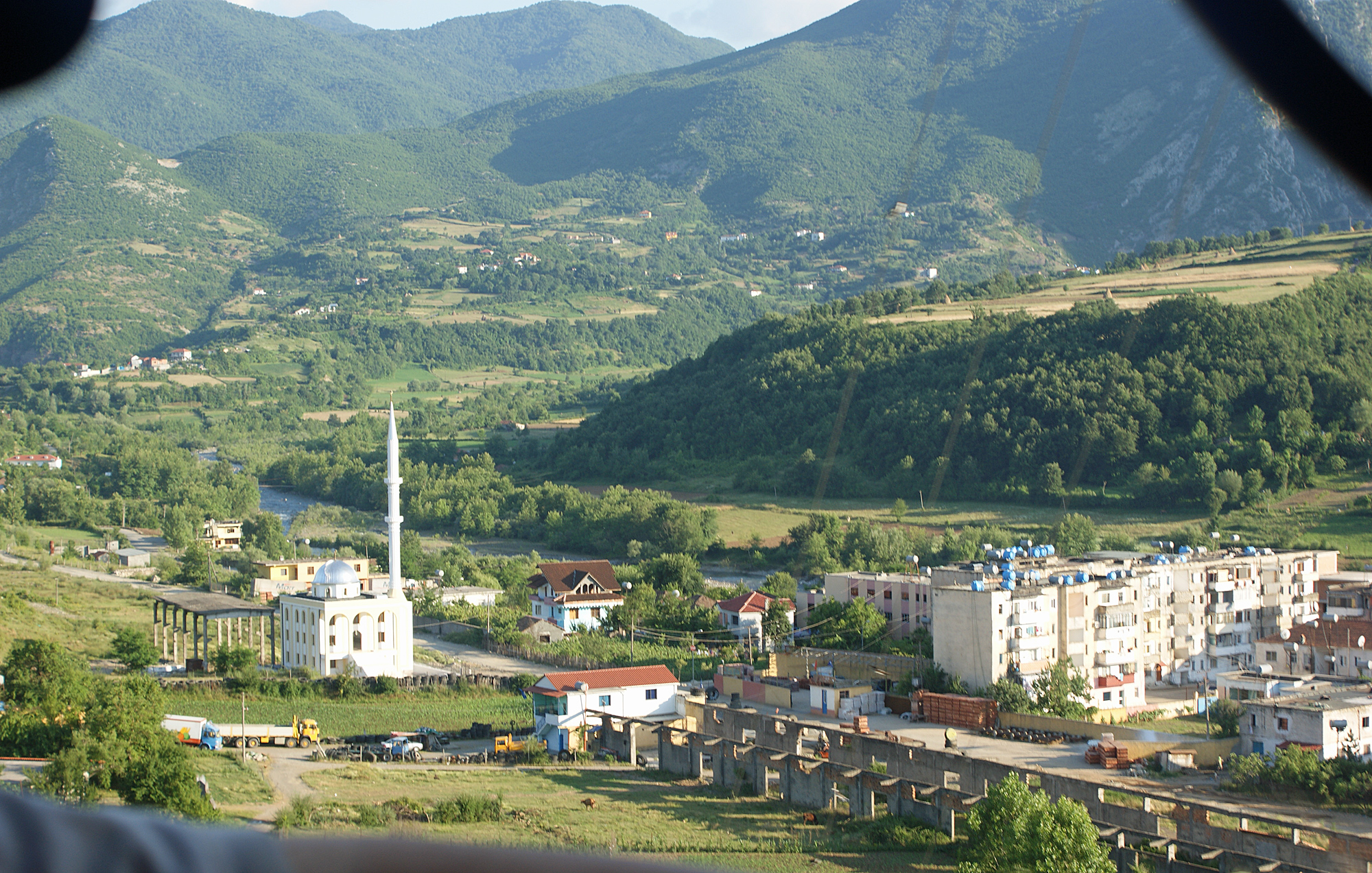

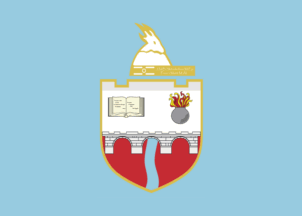
- Flag Emblem

- Location within Albania
- Coordinates: 41°30′23″N 20°05′11″E
- Country: Albania
- County: Dibër

Government
  - Mayor: Valbona Kola (PS)

Area
  - Municipality: 357.72 km^{2} (138.12 sq mi)
  - Administrative unit: 130 km^{2} (50 sq mi)
- Elevation: 277 m (909 ft)

Population (2011)
  - Municipality: 16,618
  - Municipality density: 46.455/km^{2} (120.32/sq mi)
  - Administrative unit: 7,873
  - Administrative unit density: 61/km^{2} (160/sq mi)
- Time zone: UTC+1 (CET)
  - Summer (DST): UTC+2 (CEST)
- Postal Code: 8002
- Area Code: (0)287
- Website: bashkiaklos.gov.al

Klos (Albanian definite form: Klosi) is a town and a municipality in Dibër County, northern center Albania. It was formed at the 2015 local government reform by the merger of the former municipalities Gurrë, Klos, Suç and Xibër, that became municipal units. The seat of the municipality is the town Klos. The total population is 16,618 (2011 census), in a total area of 357.72 km^{2}. The population of the former municipality at the 2011 census was 7,873. Klos lies 29.8 kilometers (17¾ mi) from Tirana and 13 kilometers (9 mi) from Burrel.

== Demographic history ==
Klos (Kilos) is recorded in the Ottoman defter of 1467 as a hass-ı mir-liva and derbendci settlement in the vilayet of Mati. The village had a total of eight households represented by the following household heads: Kozma Kimiza, Progon Shargjini, Martin Doroza, Gjin Doroza, Dula Cukali, Margjin Prifti, Ilia Kimiza, and Kola Kimiza.

== Sports ==
Klos has a football team known as FC Klosi, which competes in the Albanian Second Division.
