= Katund i Ri =

- Administrative unit
- Location within Albania
- Coordinates: 41°24′N 19°31′E
- Country: Albania
- County: Durrës
- Municipality: Durrës

Population (2011)
  - Administrative unit: 10,161
- Time zone: UTC+1 (CET)
  - Summer (DST): UTC+2 (CEST)
- Postal Code: 2017
- Area Code: (0)576

Katund i Ri is a village and a former municipality in the Durrës County, western Albania. At the 2015 local government reform it became a subdivision of the municipality Durrës. The population at the 2011 census was 10,161.
