= KF Shënkolli =

Albanian football club

Shënkolli
- Full name: Klubi i Futbollit Shënkolli
- Founded: 5 July 2011; 15 years ago
- Ground: Shënkolli Stadium
- Chairman: Artan Djala
- Manager: Alban Bruka
- League: Kategoria e Tretë, Group A
- 2025–26: Kategoria e Tretë, Group A, 6th
Home colours	Away colours

Klubi i Futbollit Shënkolli is an Albanian football club based in Shënkoll. The club currently competes in the Kategoria e Tretë.

== History ==
The club was founded on 5 July 2011.

After competing for 4 years in Albania's lowest football category, FK Shënkolli was promoted for the first time to the Albanian First Division.

The club was excluded from the 2023-24 Kategoria e Dytë, and relegated to the Kategoria e Tretë, due to repeated violence against referees in the 10th round.
