= KS Turbina =

Albanian football club

Turbina
- Full name: Klubi Sportiv Turbina
- Founded: 1956; 70 years ago
- Ground: Nexhip Trungu Stadium
- Capacity: 6,600
- President: Gentjan Gjoka
- Manager: Sinan Bardhi
- League: Kategoria e Tretë, Group B
- 2025–26: Kategoria e Tretë, Group B, 9th
Home colours	Away colours

KS Turbina is an Albanian football club based in Cërrik. Founded in 1956, the club competes in the Albanian Third Division and plays its home matches at the Nexhip Trungu Stadium, which has a capacity of 6,600 spectators. Its traditional colors are red and white.

== History ==
Turbina was established in 1956 under the name Puna Cërrik, adapting the communist-era practice whereby football clubs were imposed the name Puna, meaning "Labor". Two years later, in 1958, it changed its name to Turbina, which it has kept ever since. For much of its early existence, the club competed in Albania’s lower divisions.

Turbina earned promotion to the second division for the first time after finishing as runners-up in the 1982–83 season. The club placed seventh in its inaugural second-tier campaign but was relegated the following season. It returned to Kategoria e Parë by winning the 1987–88 Kategoria e Dytë, securing its first league championship.

Throughout the late 1980s and 1990s, Turbina became a regular participant in the Albanian second division, typically finishing in mid-table. Relegation at the end of the 1997–98 season saw the club drop to the third tier, where it spent four seasons before earning promotion again in 2002. That return proved brief, as the club was relegated after the 2002–03 campaign.

The club won its second Kategoria e Dytë championship in 2005, securing another promotion to the second division.

== Honours ==
- Kategoria e Dytë
  - Winners (2): 1987–88, 2004–05
