= FK Tepelena =

Albanian football club

- Full name: Futboll Klub Tepelena
- Founded: 1945; 81 years ago
- Ground: Sabaudin Shehu Stadium
- Capacity: 2,000
- President: Tërmet Peçi
- Manager: Ilir Selimi
- League: Kategoria e Tretë, Group B
- 2025–26: Kategoria e Tretë, Group B, 4th
Home colours	Away colours

Futboll Klub Tepelena is an Albanian football club based on Tepelenë, founded in 1945. Their home ground is "Sabaudin Shehu Stadium". The team currently plays in the Kategoria e Tretë.

== History ==
In 1986, the traditional football team "Minatori" was divided into two separate clubs: "Minatori Tepelenë" and "Minatori Memaliaj", both of which were part of the same sports club. The Tepelenë side continued to be represented mainly by players from the former "Minatori", while only a few transferred to the newly formed Memaliaj team. Matches were played at the Sabaudin Shehu Stadium.

The first coaches of "Minatori Tepelenë" included Vladimir Bushi (1986–87), Skënder Brahimi (1987–88), and Vladimir S. Shehu (1989–90), assisted by Ferman Haska. During the 1990–92 seasons, the team was managed by Mihal Çimi, while in 1994–95 it was led by Myzafer Shehu following a championship interruption in 1993–94. In 1996, the club was renamed "Tepelena" under coach Aleks Imeri (1995–96).

After another championship suspension in 1997, Ilir Selimi took over as player-coach between 1998 and 1999. In 2000, Mihal Çimi returned as head coach, and from the early 2000s until 2023, the team has been managed by Ilir Selimi.

== Players ==
=== Notable former players ===
Over the years, a large number of footballers have played for the club. Some of the more notable among them include:

- Aleksandër Qiqi (goalkeeper, captain, from Gjirokaster)
- Flamur Hoxha (central defender, from Memaliaj)
- Bektash Caushi (midfielder, from Memaliaj)
- Ndreko Qesko (midfielder, from Memaliaj)
- Vladimir Muçi (defender, captain, from Memaliaj)
- Arben Shehu (midfielder/forward, from Memaliaj)
- Ilir Selimi (player-coach, 1998–99)
- Artan Mera (defender)
- Mustafa Nela (midfielder, from Memaliaj)
- Artur Beluli (defender)
- Bruno Luiz Batista Nogueira (Brazilian forward)
- Joao Paulo Evangelista da Silva (Brazilian forward)
- Dhimitrios Sakas (Greek defender)

== Current squad ==
As of 15 November 2015

Note: Flags indicate national team as defined under FIFA eligibility rules; some limited exceptions apply. Players may hold more than one non-FIFA nationality.

No.	Pos.	Nation	Player
3	DF	ALB	Shpëtim Abazaj
4	DF	ALB	Retjan Sulaj (Captain)
5	DF	ALB	Beqir Buxaj
7	MF	ALB	Aleksandër Jaupi
9	FW	ALB	Kosta Aliaj
11	FW	BRA	Joao Paulo Evangelista da Silva
12	GK	ALB	Kristian Sunda
14	MF	BRA	Demetrios David da Silva

No.	Pos.	Nation	Player
16	MF	ALB	Kulemans Havaraj
17	DF	GRE	Dhimitrios Sakas
18	FW	BRA	Bruno Luiz Batista Nogueira
6	DF	ALB	Kleando Ruçi
18	MF	ALB	Arbër Shehu
13	DF	ALB	Andi Cana
19	DF	ALB	Erald Kuçi
8	MF	ALB	Elis Beluli
