= Sopoti Stadium =

Multi-use stadium in Librazhd, Albania

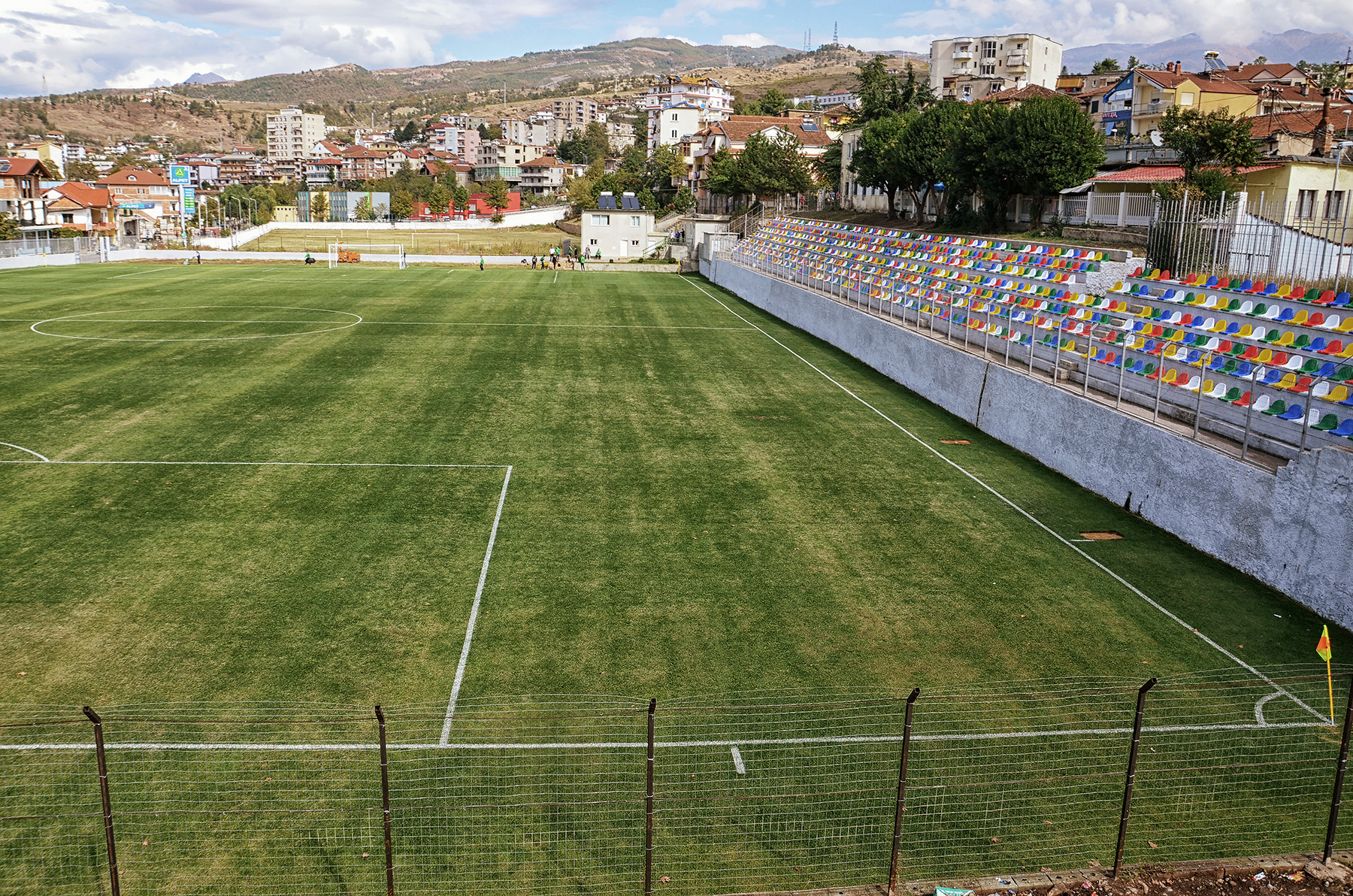
- Interactive map of Sopoti Stadium
- Full name: Sopoti Stadium
- Location: Librazhd, Albania
- Coordinates: 41°10′50.7″N 20°18′48.9″E
- Owner: Sopoti Librazhd; Librazhd Municipality
- Operator: Sopoti Librazhd
- Capacity: 3,000
- Surface: Grass

Construction
- Opened: 1964

Tenant
- Apolonia Fier

Sopoti Stadium (Albanian: Stadiumi Sopoti) is a multi-use stadium in Librazhd, Albania which is used as the home ground of local football club Sopoti Librazhd. It was built in 1964 and the 3,000 seater stadium has been Sopoti Librazhd's home ground ever since. The stadium is not currently fit for use but the Albanian Football Association along with the Librazhd Municipality have drawn up initial plans to reconstruct the stadium in its entirety, but such plans have yet to be materialized due to a lack of funding.

As of the 2014–15 season, the stadium does not meet the current Albanian Football Association's standard requirements, due to the outdated and run down nature of the building as well as the field. In July 2014, there were sightings of snakes on the field due to the lack of maintenance regarding the pitch, where there had previously been flooding which led to sewage works finding their way onto the field of the stadium.
