= FC Gramozi =

Albanian football club

Gramozi
- Full name: Football Club Gramozi
- Nickname: Kolonjarët
- Founded: 1927; 99 years ago
- Ground: Ersekë Stadium
- Capacity: 6,000
- President: Mustafa Taçi
- Manager: Ilir Qirjako
- League: Kategoria e Tretë, Group B
- 2025–26: Kategoria e Tretë, Group B, 8th
Home colours	Away colours

Football Club Gramozi is an Albanian football club based in Ersekë.

== History ==
The club was founded in 1927 and competed in the lower divisions of Albanian football for much of its history. The club were crowned winners of the Albanian Second Division for the 2007–08 season, which led to their promotion to the Albanian First Division, the second tier. They were promoted to the Albanian Superliga for the first time at the end of the 2008–09 season, after beating Bylis Ballsh 5–2 in the playoff.

The club achieved worldwide recognition in 2010 when they organised a friendly for the Taçi Oil Cup with Spanish giants Real Madrid in Tirana. The game ended in a 2–1 win for Real Madrid despite there being a lengthy two-hour power outage at half time at the Qemal Stafa Stadium. Gramozi were relegated from Albania's top level at the end of the 2009/10 season, after finishing bottom and 16 points from safety with former international player Agim Canaj at the helm.

== Honours ==
- Kategoria e Dytë:
  - Winners (1): 2007–08

== Current squad ==
As of 22 November 2015

Note: Flags indicate national team as defined under FIFA eligibility rules; some limited exceptions apply. Players may hold more than one non-FIFA nationality.

No.	Pos.	Nation	Player
3	DF	ALB	Ardit Baci
4	DF	ALB	Enea Mydin
13	DF	ALB	Nasiel Maze
6	DF	ALB	Marius Faslliaj
9	FW	ALB	Muharel Lumani (Captain)
10	MF	ALB	Ergis Mydin
11	MF	ALB	Qemal Rumi
12	GK	ALB	Ingrit Metko
14	MF	ALB	Klajdi Çaushi

No.	Pos.	Nation	Player
17	FW	ALB	Erjon Cenko
21	FW	ALB	Adriatik Kodra
1	GK	ALB	Emiljano Peleshko
2	DF	ALB	Mario Byreku
7	MF	ALB	Donald Mete
8	MF	ALB	Hetem Mydini
5	DF	ALB	Gerald Gjoni
15	MF	ALB	Dorian Liço
16	DF	ALB	Maldin Lice
