= KF Memaliaj =

Albanian football club

Memaliaj
- Full name: Klubi i Futbollit Memaliaj
- Founded: 1947; 79 years ago
- Ground: Karafil Çaushi Stadium
- Capacity: 1,500
- Owner: Bashkia Memaliaj
- Manager: Klodian Mustafai
- League: Kategoria e Dytë, Group B
- 2025–26: Kategoria e Tretë, Group B, 2nd (promoted)
Home colours	Away colours

KF Memaliaj is an Albanian football club based in Memaliaj, Tepelenë Municipality. Established in 1947, the club emerged following the relocation of the local side Minatori from Memaliaj to Tepelenë. Since then, the club has competed in Albania’s lower divisions, later being promoted to Kategoria e Parë.

== History ==
KF Memaliaj was originally founded in 1947, after the football club Minatori, which had represented Memaliaj, moved its home matches to the city of Tepelenë. The relocation prompted local football enthusiasts to establish a new club that would continue representing the town. While many Memaliaj-born players remained with Minatori, which was then competing in the Albanian Second Division, others joined the newly formed team. The club initially played its home fixtures on Memaliaj’s old football field.

The team entered the Albanian Third Division under head coach Qorjako Fani, who remained in charge until 1988. He was succeeded by Vladimir Bushi, who managed the club from 1988 to 1992.

KF Memaliaj withdrew from league competition during the 1993–94 season as widespread emigration from the town significantly reduced the number of available players. Following the club’s absence from the championship, the Albanian Football Federation (FSHF) relegated it to the Third Division.

The club returned to competition in 1994–95, again under Vladimir Bushi. Memaliaj won promotion to the Second Division after defeating Butrinti 2–0 in a promotion play-off. During the first stage of the season, former player Flamur Hoxha helped organize the lineup, while Xhevit Kacorri, who was also an active player, later assumed responsibility for the club’s organization.

In 1995, the organization was formally registered as Futboll Klub Memaliaj. The following year, the municipal council renamed the club’s stadium "Karafil Caushi Stadium", in honor of Karafil Caushi, one of the founders of organized football in the Tepelenë region.

Between 1996 and 2000, the team was coached by former Minatori players Ferman Haska and assistant coach Asllan Seferi. Seferi later became head coach between 2000 and 2002, assisted by former footballer Astrit Goxhaj.

A second spell under Vladimir Bushi from 2002 to 2009 proved to be one of the most successful periods in club history. During his tenure, KF Memaliaj earned promotion to the Albanian First Division, reaching the second tier of Albanian football for the first time.

Former player Aleksandër Qiqi managed the club in 2010, before it was excluded from league competition during the 2011–12 season. The club resumed its activities in 2012, appointing former player and captain Altin Zhupa as head coach, a position he held until 2022.

== Management ==
=== Head coaches ===
- Qorjako Fani (1986–1988)
- Vladimir Bushi (1988–1992)
- Vladimir Bushi (1994–1995)
- Ferman Haska (1996–2000)
- Asllan Seferi (assistant coach, 1996–2000)
- Asllan Seferi (2000–2002)
- Vladimir Bushi (2002–2009)
- Aleksandër Qiqi (2010)
- Altin Zhupa (2012–2022)

=== Club presidents ===
- Pandi Ciko (1995–1996)
- Përparim Kacorri (1996–1999)
- Arilla Qëndro (1999–2000)
- Selam Kocali (2000–2004)
- Xhevit Kacorri (2004–2007)
- Adriatik Kalemi (2007–2009)
- Asllan Seferi (2009–2010)
- Asllan Seferi (2012–2014)
- Arben Shehu (2014–2018)
- Xhevit Kacorri (2018–2022)

=== Personnel ===
Throughout much of the club’s history, Robert Nasi has served as the team physician. Petrit Bila has been the club’s long-serving groundskeeper.
