= SK Skrapari =

Albanian football club

Skrapari
- Full name: Sport Klub Skrapari
- Founded: 1959; 67 years ago
- Ground: Skrapar Sports Field
- Capacity: 1,500
- President: Nesim Spahiu
- Manager: Antonio Bakiu
- League: Kategoria e Tretë, Group B
- 2025–26: Kategoria e Tretë, Group B, 5th

Sport Klub Skrapari is an Albanian football club based in Çorovodë, Skrapar. The club is currently playing in the Kategoria e Tretë, which is the fourth tier of Albanian football.

== History ==
Founded in 1959, the club was named 5 Shtatori (5 September) until the 2005–06 season. Skrapari's rivals are KF Poliçani.

== Players ==
=== Notable former players ===
This is a list of SK Skrapari players with senior national team appearances:

1. (Albania) Edmond Dalipi
2. (Albania) Gëzim Kasmi
3. (Albania) Kristaq Mile
