= KF Valbona =

Albanian football club

Valbona
- Full name: Klubi i Futbolit Valbona
- Founded: 1960; 66 years ago 2013; 13 years ago (refounded)
- Ground: Bajram Curri, Albania
- Capacity: 1,904
- Owner: Bashkia Tropojë
- Manager: Emiljan Gega
- League: Kategoria e Dytë
- 2024–25: Kategoria e Parë, 11th (relegated)
Home colours	Away colours

Klubi i Futbollit Valbona commonly known as Valbona, is an Albanian professional football club based in the town of Bajram Curri. Refounded in 2013 as KF Valbona Football Club, the team has traditionally worn a blue home kit since. The team is competing in Kategoria e Dytë.

== Current squad ==
As of 23 September 2023

Note: Flags indicate national team as defined under FIFA eligibility rules; some limited exceptions apply. Players may hold more than one non-FIFA nationality.

No.	Pos.	Nation	Player
77	FW	ALB	Gerhard Progni (Capitan)
4	DF	ALB	Agustin Mashi (Vice-captain)
1	GK	ALB	Kadri Birja
12	GK	ALB	Damjano Braho
88	GK	ALB	Besnik Çelaj
17	DF	ALB	Alvaro Farruku
15	DF	ALB	Frenki lamçe
5	DF	ALB	Klevis Lushaku
26	DF	ALB	Juxhino Zeqiraj
19	DF	ALB	Blendi Rosaj
80	MF	ALB	Kristi Joti
10	MF	ALB	Ersil Ymeraj
23	MF	BRA	Diogo Armando Lopes Da Silva

No.	Pos.	Nation	Player
90	MF	ALB	Florind Taku
14	MF	ALB	Imer Zuna
8	MF	ALB	Osman Qelia
6	MF	ALB	Erdi Asllani
11	FW	ALB	Elvis Kovaçi
7	FW	ALB	Vilson Mziu
9	FW	ALB	Mateus Levendi
22	FW	ALB	Rigers Balliu

== Current staff ==
As of 21 April 2023

Stafi Teknik
(Albania) Alfred Allamani	Coach
(Albania) Gazmir Fuçija	Assistant coach
(Albania) Bruno Beqiri	Goalkeeping coach
Stafi Mjeksorë
(Albania) Elidon Haxhiaj	Physiotherapist
Stafi Mediatic dhe Marketing
(Albania) Mirela Haxhiaj	Menaxhere e Marketingut
