= Skrapar Sports Field =

Sports stadium in Çorovodë, Albania

- Fusha Sportive Skrapar
- Location: Çorovodë, Skrapar, Albania
- Owner: FK Skrapari
- Capacity: 1,500

Tenant
- FK Skrapari

Skrapar Sports Field (Albanian: Fusha Sportive Skrapar) is a purpose-built stadium in Çorovodë, Skrapar, Albania, and it is the current home of FK Skrapari.
