= 2026–27 Kategoria e Dytë =

Kategoria e Dytë
- Season: 2026–27
- Matches: 88
- Goals: 275 (3.13 per match)
- Top goalscorer: Abdulsalam Omotosho; Gersi Diamanti (7 goals each)
- Biggest home win: Bylis B 9−0 Memaliaj (11 October 2026)
- Biggest away win: Veleçiku 0−7 Partizani B (31 October 2026)
- Highest scoring: Bylis B 9−0 Memaliaj (11 October 2026)
- Longest winning run: 6 matches Gramshi; Vllaznia B
- Longest unbeaten run: 8 matches Gramshi
- Longest winless run: 6 matches Shiroka
- Longest losing run: 6 matches Shiroka

The 2026–27 Kategoria e Dytë is the 57th official season of the Albanian football third division since its establishment. There are 23 teams competing this season, split in 2 groups. The winners of the groups play the league's final against each other and also gain promotion to the 2027–28 Kategoria e Parë, along with the runner-ups. Teams ranked from the third to the sixth position qualify to the play-off round where the winners will play against the ninth and tenth ranked teams in the 2026–27 Kategoria e Parë.

== Changes from last season ==
=== Team changes ===
==== From Kategoria e Dytë ====
Promoted to Kategoria e Parë:

- Besëlidhja
- Oriku
- Sopoti

Relegated to Kategoria e Tretë:

- Adriatiku
- Shkumbini

==== To Kategoria e Dytë ====
Relegated from Kategoria e Parë:

- Apolonia
- Luftëtari
- Lushnja

Promoted from Kategoria e Tretë:

- Albpetrol
- Memaliaj
- Vllaznia B

=== Locations ===
2026–27 Group A Kategoria e Dytë teams.
2026–27 Group B Kategoria e Dytë teams.

==== Group A ====
Team	Location	Stadium	Capacity
Basania	Bushat	Basania Stadium	500
Eagle FA	Tirana	Internacional Complex	1,000
Erzeni	Shijak	Tofik Jashari Stadium	1,500
Gramshi	Gramsh	Myslim Koçi Stadium	3,100
Lushnja	Lushnjë	Roza Haxhiu Stadium	8,500
Luzi 2008	Luz i Vogël	Luz i Vogël Stadium	549
Naftëtari	Kuçovë	Bashkim Sulejmani Stadium	5,000
Partizani B	Tirana	Arena e Demave	3,959
Shiroka	Shirokë	Reshit Rusi Stadium	1,200
Tërbuni	Pukë	Ismail Xhemali Stadium	1,950
Veleçiku	Koplik	Kompleksi Vëllezërit Duli	2,000
Vllaznia B	Shkodër	Reshit Rusi Stadium	1,200

==== Group B ====
Team	Location	Stadium	Capacity
Albpetrol	Patos	Alush Noga Stadium	2,150
Apolonia	Fier	Loni Papuçiu Stadium	3,159
Butrinti	Sarandë	Andon Lapa Stadium	5,500
Bylis B	Ballsh	Bylis Football Academy	
Delvina	Delvinë	Delvina Stadium	2,500
Devolli	Bilisht	Bilisht Stadium	3,000
Këlcyra	Këlcyrë	Demir Allamani Stadium	1,000
Luftëtari	Gjirokastër	Gjirokastra Stadium	8,400
Maliqi	Maliq	Jovan Asko Stadium	1,500
Memaliaj	Memaliaj	Karafil Çaushi Stadium	1,500
Tomori	Berat	Tomori Stadium	19,230

== League standings ==
=== Group A ===
Pos	Team	Pld	W	D	L	GF	GA	GD	Pts	Promotion or relegation
1	Gramshi	8	7	1	0	18	2	+16	22	Promotion to 2027–28 Kategoria e Parë
2	Vllaznia B	8	6	0	2	16	7	+9	18	Promotion to 2027–28 Kategoria e Parë
3	Partizani B	8	4	2	2	20	10	+10	14	Play-off promotion to 2027–28 Kategoria e Parë
4	Lushnja	8	4	2	2	10	8	+2	14	Play-off promotion to 2027–28 Kategoria e Parë
5	Luzi 2008	8	3	4	1	8	5	+3	13	Play-off promotion to 2027–28 Kategoria e Parë
6	Tërbuni	8	3	2	3	14	9	+5	11	Play-off promotion to 2027–28 Kategoria e Parë
7	Erzeni	8	2	4	2	9	13	−4	10	
8	Naftëtari	8	3	1	4	8	9	−1	10	
9	Basania	8	2	3	3	9	11	−2	9	
10	Veleçiku	8	2	0	6	6	19	−13	6	
11	Eagle FA	8	1	1	6	6	19	−13	4	Play-off relegation to 2027–28 Kategoria e Tretë
12	Shiroka	8	1	0	7	8	20	−12	3	Relegation to 2027–28 Kategoria e Tretë

Updated to match(es) played on 22 November 2026. Source:
Rules for classification: 1) points; 2) head-to-head points; 3) head-to-head goal difference; 4) goal difference; 5) number of goals scored; 6) draw. (Head-to-head record is applied for clubs with the same number of points only once all matches between said clubs have been played.)

==== Results ====
Home \ Away	BAS	EAG	ERZ	GRA	LUS	LUZ	NAF	PAR	SHI	TËR	VEL	VLL
Basania	—	2–1	1–1							0–1		2–1
Eagle FA		—		0–3		1–2					0–1	
Erzeni		2–2	—		0–1	0–0	2–1		2–1			
Gramshi	0–0			—				2–0		2–0		
Lushnja	2–2				—			1–3	1–0		3–1	0–1
Luzi 2008				0–1	0–0	—		0–0			2–0	
Naftëtari	3–1			0–2	1–2		—		1–0		2–1	
Partizani B		4–1	2–2					—		3–2		
Shiroka		0–1		1–5				2–1	—	2–5		
Tërbuni		5–0				1–1	0–0			—		
Veleçiku	2–1			1–3				0–7			—	0–1
Vllaznia B			5–0			2–3	1–0		4–2	1–0		—

Updated to match(es) played on 22 November 2026. Source:
Legend: Blue = home team win; Yellow = draw; Red = away team win.
For upcoming matches, an "a" indicates there is an article about the rivalry between the two participants.

=== Group B ===
Pos	Team	Pld	W	D	L	GF	GA	GD	Pts	Promotion or relegation
1	Bylis B	7	6	1	0	26	5	+21	19	Promotion to 2027–28 Kategoria e Parë
2	Luftëtari	7	6	1	0	29	10	+19	19	Promotion to 2027–28 Kategoria e Parë
3	Maliqi	7	5	1	1	13	12	+1	16	Play-off promotion to 2027–28 Kategoria e Parë
4	Butrinti	8	5	0	3	12	7	+5	15	Play-off promotion to 2027–28 Kategoria e Parë
5	Apolonia	7	3	1	3	9	8	+1	10	Play-off promotion to 2027–28 Kategoria e Parë
6	Tomori	7	3	1	3	14	12	+2	10	Play-off promotion to 2027–28 Kategoria e Parë
7	Devolli	8	2	2	4	10	14	−4	8	
8	Albpetrol	8	2	1	5	8	14	−6	7	
9	Delvina	7	1	2	4	9	15	−6	5	
10	Këlcyra	7	1	0	6	5	20	−15	3	Play-off relegation to 2027–28 Kategoria e Tretë
11	Memaliaj	7	1	0	6	8	26	−18	3	Relegation to 2027–28 Kategoria e Tretë

Updated to match(es) played on 22 November 2026. Source:
Rules for classification: 1) points; 2) head-to-head points; 3) head-to-head goal difference; 4) goal difference; 5) number of goals scored; 6) draw.

==== Results ====
Home \ Away	ALB	APO	BUT	BYL	DEL	DEV	KËL	LUF	MAL	MEM	TOM
Albpetrol	—			2–4			3–1		0–1	2–1	
Apolonia	1–0	—	1–2		3–1						2–1
Butrinti	3–1		—	1–2				0–1			3–0
Bylis B		1–1		—		4–0	4–0			9–0	
Delvina	0–0		0–1	1–2	—			2–6			
Devolli			0–1		1–1	—		2–3			2–3
Këlcyra		2–1				0–1	—		1–3		
Luftëtari							5–1	—	6–1	6–2	
Maliqi			2–1			1–1			—		3–2
Memaliaj		1–0			2–4	1–3			1–2	—	
Tomori	3–0						3–0	2–2			—

Updated to match(es) played on 22 November 2026. Source:
Legend: Blue = home team win; Yellow = draw; Red = away team win.
For upcoming matches, an "a" indicates there is an article about the rivalry between the two participants.

== Top scorers ==
Rank	Player	Club	Goals
1	(Nigeria) Abdulsalam Omotosho	Tomori	7
1	(Albania) Gersi Diamanti	Luftëtari	7
3	(Albania) Angjelo Radovani	Devolli	6
3	(Albania) Jurgen Peqini	Gramshi	6
5	(Nigeria) Beji Anthony	Luftëtari	5
5	(Ghana) Joseph Anoo	Tërbuni	5
5	(Nigeria) Junior Allele	Vllaznia B	5
5	(Albania) Klahos Zani	Luftëtari	5
5	(Albania) Mario Mërkuri	Butrinti	5
