= 2026–27 Albanian Cup =

Kupa e Shqipërisë

Tournament details
- Country: Albania
- Teams: 42

Tournament statistics
- Matches played: 26
- Goals scored: 122 (4.69 per match)
- Top goal scorer(s): Godswill Chinwendu; Samuel Koshie (4 goals each)

The 2026–27 Albanian Cup (Albanian: Kupa e Shqipërisë) is the seventy-fifth season of Albania's annual cup competition, the Albanian Cup. There are 42 participating teams. The winners will qualify for the 2027–28 UEFA Conference League first qualifying round.

== Participating teams ==
Kategoria Superiore; The 10 clubs of the 2026–27 season	Kategoria e Parë; Twelve clubs of the 2026–27 season	Kategoria e Dytë; Twenty clubs of the 2026–27 season
Dinamo City; Egnatia; Elbasani; Laçi; Partizani; Skënderbeu; Teuta; Tirana; Vllaznia; Vora	Besa; Besëlidhja; Burreli; Bylis; Flamurtari; Iliria; Kastrioti; Korabi; Kukësi; Oriku; Pogradeci; Sopoti	Albpetrol; Apolonia; Basania; Butrinti; Delvina; Devolli; Eagle FA; Erzeni; Gramshi; Këlcyra; Luftëtari; Lushnja; Luzi 2008; Maliqi; Memaliaj; Naftëtari; Shiroka; Tërbuni; Tomori; Veleçiku

== Format and seeding ==
Teams will enter the competition at various stages, as follows:

- First phase (one-legged fixtures)
  - Preliminary round: four teams from Kategoria e Dytë will start the tournament
  - Round of 64: the two winners will be joined by 14 Kategoria e Dytë teams, 12 Kategoria e Parë teams, and 2 teams from Kategoria Superiore
  - Round of 32: the 16 winners will face each other
- Second phase
  - Round of 16 (one-legged): the eight winners will be joined by Kategoria Superiore clubs, seeded 1–8
  - Quarter-finals (two-legged): the eight winners will face each other
  - Semi-finals (two-legged): the four winners will face each other
  - Final (one-legged): the two winners will face each other

== Round dates ==
Phase	Round	Clubs remaining	Clubs involved	From previous round	Entries in this round	First leg	Second leg
First stage	Preliminary round	42	4	none	4	16 September 2026	
First stage	Round of 64	40	32	2	30	6 & 7 October 2026	
First stage	Round of 32	24	16	16	none	17 & 18 November 2026	
Second stage	Round of 16	16	16	8	8	9 January 2027	
Second stage	Quarter-finals	8	8	8	none	10 February 2027	March 2027
Second stage	Semi-finals	4	4	4	none	7 April 2027	21 April 2027
Second stage	Final	2	2	2	none	12 May 2027	

== Preliminary round ==
A total of four teams from Kategoria e Dytë competed in this round, two of which advanced.

Team 1	Score	Team 2
Albpetrol (III)	3−0	Memaliaj (III)
Gramshi (III)	1−0	Basania (III)

16 September 2026	Albpetrol	3−0	Memaliaj	Alush Noga Stadium, Patos
15:00	Ubah 38', 88'; Muço 63'			Referee: Besnard Kaimi

Albpetrol advanced to the round of 64.

16 September 2026	Gramshi	1−0	Basania	Nexhip Trungu Stadium, Cërrik
15:00	Tabaku 54'			Referee: Djonis Kushta

Gramshi advanced to the round of 64.

== Round of 64 ==
A total of 32 teams (2 winners from the preliminary round, 18 teams from Kategoria e Dytë, 12 teams from Kategoria e Parë and 2 Kategoria Superiore teams) competed in this round, 16 of which advancd to the second round.

Team 1	Score	Team 2
Bylis (II)	4−1	Albpetrol (III)
Flamurtari (II)	4−1	Gramshi (III)
Laçi (I)	8−2	Këlcyra (III)
Skënderbeu (I)	4−1	Naftëtari (III)
Pogradeci (II)	7−0	Delvina (III)
Iliria (II)	4−3	Veleçiku (III)
Besa (II)	4−1	Devolli (III)
Kastrioti (II)	3−1	Luzi 2008 (III)
Burreli (II)	2−3	Eagle FA (III)
Korabi (II)	2−1	Tërbuni (III)
Luftëtari (III)	5−0	Tomori (III)
Kukësi (II)	3−2	Erzeni (III)
Apolonia (III)	3−1	Maliqi (III)
Lushnja (III)	0−4	Shiroka (III)
Oriku (II)	1−2	Butrinti (III)
Besëlidhja (II)	2−1 (a.e.t.)	Sopoti (II)

7 October 2026	Bylis	4−1	Albpetrol	Adush Muçaj Stadium, Ballsh
13:30	Zhaku 10', 72'; Hodo 18'; Marku 79'		Baparapé 33'	Referee: Rigert Zeneli

Bylis advanced to the round of 32.

6 October 2026	Flamurtari	4−1	Gramshi	Oriku Stadium, Orikum
13:30	Barry 2'; Berisha 12', 14'; Doku 56'		Nasir 74'	Referee: Erges Bala

Flamurtari advanced to the round of 32.

7 October 2026	Laçi	8−2	Këlcyra	National Sports Centre, Kamëz
13:30	Azizi 4'; Cena 25'; Nerguti 29'; Muhammad 47', 61'; Veseli 72'; Trad 74', 80'		Fuçija 59'; Sheme 81'	Referee: Besnard Kaimi

Laçi advanced to the round of 32.

6 October 2026	Skënderbeu	4−1	Naftëtari	Skënderbeu Stadium, Korçë
13:30	Musa 2'; Charles 43'; Braga 44'; Thomas 90+1'		Agalliu 76'	Referee: Enis Dishani

Skënderbeu advanced to the round of 32.

7 October 2026	Pogradeci	7−0	Delvina	Gjorgji Kyçyku Stadium, Pogradec
13:30	Meksi 42'; Kazeem 61', 65', 90'; Chinwendu 75'; Lleshaj 84', 87'			Referee: Olgert Nuhi

Pogradeci advanced to the round of 32.

7 October 2026	Iliria	4−3	Veleçiku	Tofik Jashari Stadium, Shijak
13:30	Koshie 4', 21'; Çuçka 11'; Selmani 89'		Brojaj 50', 90+3'; Uldedaj 90'	Referee: Gerard Çokaj

Iliria advanced to the round of 32.

7 October 2026	Besa	4−1	Devolli	Fusha e Akademisë KF Besa, Kavajë
13:30	Sylas 51', 73'; Rrena 65' (pen.); Monteiro 66'		Beçka 19'	Referee: Klajdi Qëndraj

Besa advanced to the round of 32.

7 October 2026	Kastrioti	3−1	Luzi 2008	Fusha e Sportit Ahmetaq, Ahmetaq
13:30	Tepshi 22'; Hoxha 58'; Farruku 90+6'		Ocheje 15'	Referee: Bekris Dragusha

Kastrioti advanced to the round of 32.

7 October 2026	Burreli	2−3	Eagle FA	Liri Ballabani Stadium, Burrel
13:30	Krasniqi 60' (pen.); Koçi 90+4'		Sulaj 57'; Çelkupa 76'; Nonaj 90+1'	Referee: Xhuljan Bacaj

Eagle FA advanced to the round of 32.

7 October 2026	Korabi	2−1	Tërbuni	Korabi Stadium, Peshkopi
13:30	Spahiu 23'; Morina 37' (pen.)		Anoo 45+1'	Referee: Indrit Myrtja

Korabi advanced to the round of 32.

7 October 2026	Luftëtari	5−0	Tomori	Gjirokastra Stadium, Gjirokastër
13:30	Kadhe 37'; Devolli 52' (pen.); Anthony 68', 84'; Karasani 89'			Referee: Johan Kusta

Luftëtari advanced to the round of 32.

7 October 2026	Kukësi	3−2	Erzeni	Kukës Arena, Kukës
13:30	Ferreira 52'; Gjumsi 58'; Vidrica 90+3'		Tota 72' (pen.); Veriu 83'	Referee: Florjan Hysa

Kukësi advanced to the round of 32.

7 October 2026	Apolonia	3−1	Maliqi	Loni Papuçiu Stadium, Fier
13:30	Mehmeti 17'; Mahmutaj 19'; Owusu 67'		Juninho 32' (pen.)	Referee: Ardit Merdanaj

Apolonia advanced to the round of 32.

7 October 2026	Lushnja	0−4	Shiroka	Fusha e Plugut, Plug
13:30			Vucaj 35'; Drabeja 38'; Kurti 84', 89'	Referee: Erald Demiraj

Shiroka advanced to the round of 32.

7 October 2026	Oriku	1−2	Butrinti	Oriku Stadium, Orikum
13:30	Oliveira 59'		Mërkuri 7'; Kolonja 82'	Referee: Klodian Shahini

Butrinti advanced to the round of 32.

6 October 2026	Besëlidhja	2−1 (a.e.t.)	Sopoti	Fusha e Sportit Ahmetaq, Ahmetaq
13:30	Hila 25' (pen.); Marku 93'		Jargavani 32' (pen.)	Referee: Egli Spahiu

Besëlidhja advanced to the round of 32.

== Round of 32 ==
The 16 winning teams from the first round competed in the second round, 8 of which advanced to the round of 16.

Team 1	Score	Team 2
Kastrioti (II)	5−2 (a.e.t.)	Eagle FA (III)
Besa (II)	4−1	Korabi (II)
Iliria (II)	5−0	Luftëtari (III)
Pogradeci (II)	5−1	Kukësi (II)
Skënderbeu (I)	2−1 (a.e.t.)	Apolonia (III)
Laçi (I)	3−0	Shiroka (III)
Flamurtari (II)	6−1	Butrinti (III)
Bylis (II)	2−0	Besëlidhja (II)

18 November 2026	Kastrioti	5−2 (a.e.t.)	Eagle FA	Fusha e Sportit Ahmetaq, Ahmetaq
13:00	Sulaj 16'; Dosseh 92'; Hoxha 114', 120+1'; Xhixho 117'		Gabriel 90+8'; Bashari 118'	Referee: Bekris Dragusha

Kastrioti advanced to the round of 16.

18 November 2026	Besa	4−1	Korabi	Fusha e Akademisë KF Besa, Kavajë
13:00	Danaj 37'; Prengaj 43'; Sylas 47'; Zekolli 78'		Reçi 71' (pen.)	Referee: Olsion Yzeiraj

Besa advanced to the round of 16.

18 November 2026	Iliria	5−0	Luftëtari	Internacional Complex, Pezë Helmës
13:00	Koshie 3', 38'; Çulli 52' (o.g.); Çuçka 69'; Adeniyi 77'			Referee: Granit Sulko

Iliria advanced to the round of 16.

18 November 2026	Pogradeci	5−1	Kukësi	Gjorgji Kyçyku Stadium, Pogradec
13:00	Chinwendu 2', 54', 65'; Kambato 37'; Preknicaj 83'		Korçari 42'	Referee: Erjon Bylykbashi

Pogradeci advanced to the round of 16.

17 November 2026	Skënderbeu	2−1 (a.e.t.)	Apolonia	Skënderbeu Stadium, Korçë
13:00	Ndiaye 104'; Dramé 116'		Sulo 94'	Referee: Klajdi Qëndraj

Skënderbeu advanced to the round of 16.

17 November 2026	Laçi	3−0	Shiroka	Laçi Stadium, Laç
13:00	Tola 13'; Nërguti 71'; Bibo 80'			Referee: Ervin Latifi

Laçi advanced to the round of 16.

18 November 2026	Flamurtari	6−1	Butrinti	Oriku Stadium, Orikum
13:00	Gjata 8'; Lushaj 68', 77'; Ani 74'; Berisha 83'; Ramani 86'		Çulli 85'	Referee: Xhuljan Bacaj

Flamurtari advanced to the round of 16.

18 November 2026	Bylis	2−0	Besëlidhja	Gjirokastra Stadium, Gjirokastër
13:00	Ofori 3'; Vieira 88'			Referee: Klodian Shahini

Bylis advanced to the round of 16.

== Round of 16 ==
The round of 16 matches will be played between the eight winners from the second round and clubs seeded 1–8 in the 2025–26 Kategoria Superiore.

Team 1	Score	Team 2
Egnatia (I)		Kastrioti (II)
Elbasani (I)		Besa (II)
Vllaznia (I)		Iliria (II)
Dinamo City (I)		Pogradeci (II)
Partizani (I)		Skënderbeu (I)
Tirana (I)		Laçi (I)
Vora (I)		Flamurtari (II)
Teuta (I)		Bylis (II)

9 January 2027	Egnatia	v	Kastrioti	Egnatia Arena, Rrogozhinë

9 January 2027	Elbasani	v	Besa	Elbasan Arena, Elbasan

9 January 2027	Vllaznia	v	Iliria	Loro Boriçi Stadium, Shkodër

9 January 2027	Dinamo City	v	Pogradeci

9 January 2027	Partizani	v	Skënderbeu

9 January 2027	Tirana	v	Laçi	Selman Stërmasi Stadium, Tirana

9 January 2027	Vora	v	Flamurtari	Vora Stadium, Vorë

9 January 2027	Teuta	v	Bylis	Niko Dovana Stadium, Durrës

== Top goalscorers ==
Rank	Player	Club	Goals
1	(Nigeria) Godswill Chinwendu	Pogradeci	4
1	(Ghana) Samuel Koshie	Iliria	4
3	(Albania) Edmond Hoxha	Kastrioti	3
3	(North Macedonia) Jakup Berisha	Flamurtari	3
3	(Nigeria) Sodiq Kazeem	Pogradeci	3
3	(Brazil) Sylas	Besa	3
