= 2019–20 Kategoria e Dytë =

Kategoria e Dytë
- Season: 2019–20
- Champions: Vora; 2nd title
- Promoted: Partizani B Tomori; Vora
- Relegated: Kamza; Selenica
- Matches: 277
- Goals: 1,020 (3.68 per match)
- Biggest home win: Memaliaj 8−1 Selenica (27 October 2019); Partizani B 8−1 Klosi (13 June 2020); Tomori 8−1 Selenica (8 July 2020)
- Biggest away win: Internacional Tirana 0−7 Vora (28 June 2020)
- Highest scoring: Skrapari 3−8 Maliqi (7 June 2020)
- Longest winning run: 12 matches Tomori
- Longest unbeaten run: 17 matches Vora
- Longest winless run: 16 matches Selenica
- Longest losing run: 12 matches Internacional Tirana

The 2019-20 Kategoria e Dytë was the 40th official season of the Albanian football third division since its establishment. There were 26 teams competing this season, split in 2 groups. The winners of the groups played the league's final against each other and also gained promotion to the 2020–21 Kategoria e Parë. Teams ranked from the 2nd to the 5th position qualified to the play-off round which they played against the 8th ranked teams in the 2019-20 Kategoria e Parë. Partizani B, Tomori and Vora were promoted to the 2020–21 Kategoria e Parë. Vora won their second Kategoria e Dytë title after beating Tomori in the final match. The competition was completely suspended from 12 March to 7 June 2020, due to the COVID-19 Pandemic.

== Changes from last season ==
=== Team changes ===
==== From Second Division ====
Promoted to Kategoria e Parë:

- Devolli
- Shkumbini
- Tërbuni

==== To Second Division ====
Expelled from Kategoria Superiore:

- Kamza

Relegated from Kategoria e Parë:

- Tomori
- Vora

Promoted from Kategoria e Tretë:

- Mirdita
- Selenica

=== Locations ===
2019–20 Group A Kategoria e Dytë teams.
2019–20 Group B Kategoria e Dytë teams.

=== Stadia by capacity and locations ===
==== Group A ====
Team	Location	Stadium	Capacity
Ada	Velipojë	Adriatik Velipojë	1,200
Gramshi	Gramsh	Mislim Koçi Stadium	1,500
Internacional Tirana	Tirana	Internacional Complex	1,000
Kamza	Kamëz	Kamëz Stadium	5,500
Mirdita	Rrëshen		
Klosi	Klos		
Luzi 2008	Luz i Vogël	Luz i Vogël Stadium	600
Partizani B	Tirana	National Sports Centre	50
Sopoti	Librazhd	Sopoti Stadium	3,000
Spartaku	Tirana	Stadiumi Marko Boçari	2,500
Tirana B	Tirana	Skënder Halili Complex	200
Vora	Vorë	Fusha Sportive Marikaj	1,000
Vllaznia B	Shkodër	Reshit Rusi Stadium	1,200

==== Group B ====
Team	Location	Stadium	Capacity
Albpetrol	Patos	Alush Noga Stadium	2,150
Butrinti	Sarandë	Butrinti Stadium	5,000
Delvina	Delvinë	Panajot Pano Stadium	2,500
Gramozi	Ersekë	Ersekë Stadium	2,000
Këlcyra	Këlcyrë	Fusha Sportive Këlcyrë	1,000
Maliqi	Maliq	Jovan Asko Stadium	1,500
Memaliaj	Memaliaj	Karafil Caushi Stadium	1,500
Naftëtari	Kuçovë	Bashkim Sulejmani Stadium	5,000
Përmeti	Përmet	Durim Qypi Stadium	4,000
Selenica	Selenicë	Selenicë Stadium	4,000
Skrapari	Çorovodë	Skrapar Sports Field	1,500
Tepelena	Tepelenë	Sabaudin Shehu Stadium	2,000
Tomori	Berat	Tomori Stadium	14,450

== League standings ==
=== Group A ===
Pos	Team	Pld	W	D	L	GF	GA	GD	Pts	Promotion or relegation
1	Vora (C, P)	22	18	2	2	65	14	+51	56	Promotion to 2020–21 Kategoria e Parë
2	Luzi 2008	22	17	2	3	59	25	+34	53	Play-off promotion to 2020–21 Kategoria e Parë
3	Partizani B (O, P)	22	14	3	5	55	22	+33	45	Play-off promotion to 2020–21 Kategoria e Parë
4	Sopoti	22	13	2	7	40	23	+17	41	Play-off promotion to 2020–21 Kategoria e Parë
5	Gramshi	22	12	2	8	37	28	+9	38	Play-off promotion to 2020–21 Kategoria e Parë
6	Mirdita	22	12	1	9	38	44	−6	37	
7	Tirana B (D)	22	7	3	12	22	35	−13	24	Dissolved after the season (Note: All B teams participating in the Kategoria e Dytë were dissolved after the 2019−20 season, due to the foundation of the U21 Albanian Championship. As a result, only 1 team from each group was relegated and Internacional Tirana was spared from relegation.)
8	Vllaznia B (D)	22	6	4	12	25	39	−14	22	Dissolved after the season
9	Klosi	22	6	2	14	33	55	−22	20	
10	Spartaku	22	5	4	13	28	52	−24	19	
11	Ada (Note: Ada were deducted 3 points, after fielding an ineligible player.)	22	6	3	13	29	54	−25	18	
12	Internacional Tirana	22	2	0	20	27	67	−40	6	
13	Kamza (Note: Kamza withdrew from the competition after the 11th round. They were also deducted 3 points.) (E, R)	0	0	0	0	0	0	0	−3	Withdrew

Source: Soccerway
Rules for classification: 1) points; 2) goal difference; 3) number of goals scored; 4) head-to-head points; 5) head-to-head goal difference; 6) draw. (Head-to-head record is applied for clubs with the same number of points only once all matches between said clubs have been played.)
(C) Champions; (D) Dissolved after the season; (E) Expelled; (O) Play-off winners; (P) Promoted; (R) Relegated

==== Results ====
Home \ Away	ADA	INT	GRA	KLO	LUZ	MIR	PAB	SOP	SPA	TIB	VLB	VOR
Ada	—	3–2	3–2	3–0	1–5	1–2	3–1	0–0	1–0	2–1	1–1	0–3
Internacional Tirana	4–0	—	2–3	6–2	1–3	3–4	0–3	2–4	1–4	1–2	0–1	0–7
Gramshi	4–0	1–0	—	1–1	0–2	3–1	0–1	2–1	5–2	3–0	2–0	2–0
Klosi	3–0	3–1	1–1	—	3–6	0–1	2–1	0–4	5–0	3–1	3–0	0–5
Luzi 2008	4–1	1–0	4–1	3–0	—	5–1	3–2	2–1	1–0	5–0	1–0	3–3
Mirdita	3–1	4–1	1–2	2–1	1–2	—	1–6	1–0	5–2	1–0	1–0	1–4
Partizani B	3–1	5–1	2–0	8–1	4–2	1–3	—	2–0	4–0	0–0	4–0	1–1
Sopoti	3–2	4–0	2–0	3–2	1–0	2–0	0–1	—	4–1	3–0	4–1	2–0
Spartaku	4–4	1–0	0–3	1–0	3–3	1–3	0–2	0–0	—	2–1	5–2	2–3
Tirana B	2–0	3–0	0–2	3–2	0–2	3–1	1–1	1–2	1–0	—	2–1	1–2
Vllaznia B	3–2	5–1	4–0	2–1	0–2	1–1	2–3	2–0	0–0	0–0	—	0–2
Vora	4–0	4–1	1–0	4–0	2–0	5–0	1–0	4–0	4–0	2–1	4–0	—

Source: Soccerway
Legend: Blue = home team win; Yellow = draw; Red = away team win.
For upcoming matches, an "a" indicates there is an article about the rivalry between the two participants.

=== Group B ===
Pos	Team	Pld	W	D	L	GF	GA	GD	Pts	Promotion or relegation
1	Tomori (P)	24	21	1	2	87	24	+63	64	Promotion to 2020–21 Kategoria e Parë
2	Maliqi	24	18	5	1	60	24	+36	59	Play-off promotion to 2020–21 Kategoria e Parë
3	Albpetrol	24	18	3	3	48	23	+25	57	Play-off promotion to 2020–21 Kategoria e Parë
4	Butrinti	24	12	7	5	61	27	+34	43	Play-off promotion to 2020–21 Kategoria e Parë
5	Memaliaj	24	11	2	11	45	37	+8	35	Play-off promotion to 2020–21 Kategoria e Parë
6	Përmeti	24	9	5	10	31	44	−13	32	
7	Delvina	24	9	4	11	44	44	0	31	
8	Këlcyra	24	7	7	10	42	46	−4	28	
9	Naftëtari	24	8	3	13	36	36	0	27	
10	Tepelena	24	8	3	13	35	55	−20	27	
11	Gramozi	24	5	6	13	24	45	−21	21	
12	Skrapari (Note: All B teams participating in the Kategoria e Dytë were dissolved after the 2019−20 season, due to the foundation of the U21 Albanian Championship. As a result, only 1 team from each group was relegated and Skrapari was spared from relegation.)	24	4	2	18	29	63	−34	14	
13	Selenica (Note: Selenica were deducted 3 points, after failing to show up in a match against Albpetrol.) (R)	24	1	2	21	18	92	−74	2	Relegation to 2021 Kategoria e Tretë

Source: Soccerway
Rules for classification: 1) points; 2) goal difference; 3) number of goals scored; 4) head-to-head points; 5) head-to-head goal difference; 6) draw. (Head-to-head record is applied for clubs with the same number of points only once all matches between said clubs have been played.)
(P) Promoted; (R) Relegated

==== Results ====
Home \ Away	ALB	BUT	DEL	GRM	KËL	MAL	MEM	NAF	PËR	SEL	SKR	TEP	TOM
Albpetrol	—	2–0	2–0	2–0	2–0	1–1	2–0	2–1	2–0	4–1	2–0	2–1	1–2
Butrinti	2–2	—	1–1	6–2	5–2	0–2	5–0	1–0	3–0	4–0	5–0	4–0	2–3
Delvina	1–2	2–2	—	4–2	7–2	0–2	4–2	1–0	2–0	4–2	2–0	2–3	0–2
Gramozi	1–2	1–1	0–1	—	1–1	0–1	1–0	2–0	0–3	1–1	3–1	1–0	1–2
Këlcyra	3–4	1–1	3–2	0–0	—	1–1	0–2	1–1	1–3	6–2	6–1	4–0	1–0
Maliqi	3–2	1–1	3–1	2–1	2–0	—	1–0	2–0	4–2	3–0	4–2	5–0	2–5
Memaliaj	0–1	1–0	2–1	3–0	1–1	1–1	—	3–2	5–1	8–1	4–2	2–3	1–3
Naftëtari	0–3	2–2	3–2	3–0	0–1	0–1	2–1	—	2–1	8–2	1–0	1–1	0–1
Përmeti	1–2	4–3	0–0	1–1	2–2	1–4	2–1	3–0	—	2–0	2–1	0–0	0–5
Selenica	0–3	0–6	3–3	0–2	0–4	0–2	0–1	1–5	0–1	—	0–2	2–0	1–6
Skrapari	1–1	0–2	1–2	1–1	3–2	3–8	0–2	1–0	0–1	4–1	—	3–4	1–3
Tepelena	0–2	0–2	3–2	4–1	1–0	0–2	2–4	1–3	1–1	5–0	4–2	—	1–4
Tomori	5–0	1–3	4–0	6–2	5–0	3–3	2–1	3–2	5–0	8–1	3–0	6–1	—

Source: Soccerway
Legend: Blue = home team win; Yellow = draw; Red = away team win.
For upcoming matches, an "a" indicates there is an article about the rivalry between the two participants.

== Final ==
23 July 2020
17:30

Vora	2−0	Tomori
Sadiku 31'; Mziu 39'

Niko Dovana Stadium, Durrës

== Group A Promotion play-offs ==
Semi-finals
Partizani B	4
Sopoti	0
Luzi 2008	2 (5)
Gramshi (a.e.t.)	2 (6)

Final
Partizani B	3
Gramshi	1

== Semi-finals ==
26 July 2020
17:00

Partizani B	4−0	Sopoti
Peqini 10'; Bërdufi 21'; Cara 22', 66'

Internacional Complex, Pezë Helmës

26 July 2020
17:00

Luzi 2008	2−2 (a.e.t.)	Gramshi
Sejdini 39'; Saliaj 86'		Zani 62'; Topalli 76'
Penalties
Rroshi (penalty scored); Sejdini (penalty scored); F. Taku (penalty scored); Tabaku (penalty scored); D. Taku (penalty scored); Saliaj (penalty missed); Metaj (penalty missed)	5−6	(penalty scored) Goga; (penalty scored) Hysa; (penalty scored) Topalli; (penalty scored) Zani; (penalty scored) Latifi; (penalty missed) Hasa; (penalty scored) Baku

Luz i Vogël Stadium, Luz i Vogël

== Final ==
30 July 2020
17:00

Partizani B	3−1	Gramshi
Bërdufi 64' (pen.); Cara 75'; Gjinaj 84' (pen.)		Duda 90+1'

Niko Dovana Stadium, Durrës

Partizani B qualified to the final play-off match.

== Group B Promotion play-offs ==
Semi-finals
Maliqi	2
Memaliaj	1
Albpetrol	2
Butrinti	0

Final
Maliqi	2
Albpetrol	1

== Semi-finals ==
25 July 2020
17:00

Maliqi	2−1	Memaliaj
Çaushllari 55'; Xaka 63'		Jaupi 87'

Jovan Asko Stadium, Maliq

25 July 2020
17:00

Albpetrol	2−0	Butrinti
Kumanaku 66', 90'

Alush Noga Stadium, Patos

== Final ==
30 July 2020
17:00

Maliqi	2−1	Albpetrol
Kapo 11' (o.g.); Xaka 44' (pen.)		Kapo 15'

Sopoti Stadium, Librazhd

Maliqi qualified to the final play-off match.
