= 2020–21 Kategoria e Parë =

Kategoria e Parë
- Season: 2020–21
- Champions: Egnatia; 2nd title
- Promoted: Dinamo Tirana; Egnatia
- Relegated: Elbasani; Flamurtari; Oriku; Partizani B Veleçiku
- Matches: 173
- Goals: 433 (2.5 per match)
- Top goalscorer: Mikel Canka (15 goals)
- Biggest home win: Pogradeci 5−0 Elbasani (5 December 2020)
- Biggest away win: Partizani B 2−6 Besëlidhja (7 November 2020); Veleçiku 0−4 Burreli (6 February 2021); Vora 1−5 Korabi (15 May 2021)
- Highest scoring: Besëlidhja 4−4 Erzeni (26 May 2021); Partizani B 2−6 Besëlidhja (7 November 2020)
- Longest winning run: 5 matches Dinamo Tirana; Pogradeci
- Longest unbeaten run: 13 matches Egnatia
- Longest winless run: 16 matches Elbasani
- Longest losing run: 12 matches Elbasani

The 2020–21 Kategoria e Parë was the 73rd official season of the Albanian football second-tier since its establishment. The season began on 4 November 2020 and ended on 26 May 2021. There were 18 teams competing this season, split in 2 groups, each with 9 teams. The 2 winners of each group gained promotion to the 2021-22 Kategoria Superiore, and played the division's final against each other. The runners-up of each group played a play-off match between them. The winners of the play-off played another promotion play-off match against the 8th ranked team of the 2020–21 Kategoria Superiore. Dinamo Tirana and Egnatia were promoted to the 2021–22 Kategoria Superiore. Elbasani, Flamurtari, Oriku, Partizani B and Veleçiku were relegated to the 2021–22 Kategoria e Dytë. Egnatia won their second Kategoria e Parë title on 22 May 2021 after beating Dinamo Tirana in the final match.

== Changes from last season ==
=== Team changes ===
==== From Kategoria e Parë ====
Promoted to Kategoria Superiore:

- Apolonia
- Kastrioti

Relegated to Kategoria e Dytë:

- Devolli
- Iliria
- Shënkolli
- Shkumbini
- Tërbuni

==== To Kategoria e Parë ====
Relegated from Kategoria Superiore:

- Flamurtari
- Luftëtari

Promoted from Kategoria e Dytë:

- Partizani B
- Tomori
- Vora

== Locations ==
2020–21 Kategoria e Parë Group A teams.
2020–21 Kategoria e Parë Group B teams.

=== Stadia by capacity and locations ===
==== Group A ====
Team	Location	Stadium	Capacity
Besëlidhja	Lezhë	Brian Filipi Stadium	5,000
Burreli	Burrel	Liri Ballabani Stadium	2,500
Dinamo Tirana	Tirana	Internacional Complex	1,000
Erzeni	Shijak	Tofik Jashari Stadium	4,000
Korabi	Peshkopi	Korabi Stadium	6,000
Oriku	Orikum	Fusha Sportive Orikum	2,000
Partizani B	Tirana	Internacional Complex	1,000
Veleçiku	Koplik	Reshit Rusi Stadium	1,200
Vora	Vorë	Internacional Complex	1,000

==== Group B ====
Team	Location	Stadium	Capacity
Besa	Kavajë	Luz i Vogël Stadium	600
Egnatia	Rrogozhinë	Shkumbini Stadium	9,000
Elbasani	Elbasan	Nexhip Trungu Stadium	6,600
Flamurtari	Vlorë	Flamurtari Stadium	8,500
Luftëtari	Gjirokastër	Gjirokastra Stadium	8,400
Lushnja	Lushnjë	Roza Haxhiu Stadium	8,500
Pogradeci	Pogradec	Gjorgji Kyçyku Stadium	10,700
Tomori	Berat	Tomori Stadium	14,450
Turbina	Cërrik	Nexhip Trungu Stadium	6,600

== First phase ==
=== Group A ===
==== Table ====
Pos	Team	Pld	W	D	L	GF	GA	GD	Pts	Qualification
1	Burreli	16	10	4	2	26	10	+16	34	Qualification to the Promotion round
2	Korabi	16	10	3	3	17	8	+9	33	Qualification to the Promotion round
3	Dinamo Tirana	16	10	2	4	23	9	+14	32	Qualification to the Promotion round
4	Vora	16	6	3	7	10	18	−8	21	Qualification to the Promotion round
5	Besëlidhja	16	5	5	6	19	17	+2	20	Qualification to the Relegation round
6	Erzeni	16	5	4	7	15	13	+2	19	Qualification to the Relegation round
7	Partizani B	16	3	6	7	14	25	−11	15	Qualification to the Relegation round
8	Oriku	16	4	3	9	7	15	−8	15	Qualification to the Relegation round
9	Veleçiku	16	2	4	10	10	26	−16	10	Qualification to the Relegation round

Source: Soccerway
Rules for classification: 1) points; 2) head-to-head points; 3) head-to-head goal difference; 4) goal difference; 5) number of goals scored; 6) draw. (Head-to-head record is applied for clubs with the same number of points only once all matches between said clubs have been played.)

==== Results ====
Home \ Away	BSË	BUR	DIN	ERZ	KOR	ORI	PAR	VEL	VOR
Besëlidhja	—	0–0	4–3	1–0	0–1	0–0	0–0	3–0	3–1
Burreli	1–0	—	0–0	1–0	3–0	2–0	2–1	5–2	1–0
Dinamo Tirana	2–0	2–0	—	1–2	1–0	2–0	3–0	1–0	3–0
Erzeni	0–0	2–2	0–2	—	0–1	2–0	0–1	2–0	2–0
Korabi	2–0	1–0	1–0	1–0	—	1–0	1–1	2–1	4–0
Oriku	2–0	1–1	0–1	1–0	1–0	—	0–2	1–0	1–2
Partizani B	2–6	1–3	1–2	0–3	1–1	0–0	—	1–1	1–1
Veleçiku	1–1	0–4	0–0	2–2	0–1	1–0	1–2	—	1–0
Vora	2–1	0–1	1–0	0–0	0–0	1–0	1–0	1–0	—

Source: Soccerway
Legend: Blue = home team win; Yellow = draw; Red = away team win.
For upcoming matches, an "a" indicates there is an article about the rivalry between the two participants.

=== Group B ===
==== Table ====
Pos	Team	Pld	W	D	L	GF	GA	GD	Pts	Qualification
1	Egnatia	14	9	4	1	25	5	+20	31	Qualification to the Promotion round
2	Tomori	14	9	2	3	23	11	+12	29	Qualification to the Promotion round
3	Pogradeci	14	9	1	4	24	14	+10	28	Qualification to the Promotion round
4	Besa	14	6	3	5	19	13	+6	21	Qualification to the Promotion round
5	Lushnja	14	5	4	5	16	20	−4	19	Qualification to the Relegation round
6	Turbina	14	4	6	4	14	16	−2	18	Qualification to the Relegation round
7	Flamurtari	14	3	1	10	7	20	−13	10	Qualification to the Relegation round
8	Elbasani	14	0	1	13	5	34	−29	1	Qualification to the Relegation round
9	Luftëtari	0	0	0	0	0	0	0	0	Dissolved

Source: Soccerway
Rules for classification: 1) points; 2) head-to-head points; 3) head-to-head goal difference; 4) goal difference; 5) number of goals scored; 6) draw. (Head-to-head record is applied for clubs with the same number of points only once all matches between said clubs have been played.)

==== Results ====
Home \ Away	BES	EGN	ELB	FLA	LUS	POG	TOM	TUR
Besa	—	0–0	4–0	2–0	1–1	2–1	0–2	2–0
Egnatia	3–1	—	3–0	3–0	1–1	0–0	2–0	4–1
Elbasani	1–2	0–3	—	0–1	0–1	1–2	1–3	0–0
Flamurtari	0–3	1–2	1–0	—	0–1	0–1	3–0	0–0
Lushnja	2–1	0–3	3–1	1–0	—	0–3	1–1	2–2
Pogradeci	2–1	0–1	5–0	2–1	3–2	—	1–0	2–0
Tomori	1–0	1–0	4–0	4–0	2–0	2–1	—	1–1
Turbina	0–0	0–0	2–1	1–0	2–1	4–1	1–2	—

Source: Soccerway
Legend: Blue = home team win; Yellow = draw; Red = away team win.
For upcoming matches, an "a" indicates there is an article about the rivalry between the two participants.

== Second phase ==
=== Promotion round ===
==== Group A ====
===== Table =====
Pos	Team	Pld	W	D	L	GF	GA	GD	Pts	Promotion
1	Dinamo Tirana (P)	22	15	2	5	32	13	+19	47	Promotion to 2021–22 Kategoria Superiore
2	Burreli	22	13	5	4	35	15	+20	44	Play-off promotion to 2021–22 Kategoria Superiore
3	Korabi	22	13	4	5	28	14	+14	43	
4	Vora	22	6	3	13	14	36	−22	21	

Source: Soccerway
Rules for classification: 1) points; 2) head-to-head points; 3) head-to-head goal difference; 4) goal difference; 5) number of goals scored; 6) draw. (Head-to-head record is applied for clubs with the same number of points only once all matches between said clubs have been played.)
(P) Promoted

===== Results =====
Home \ Away	BUR	DIN	KOR	VOR
Burreli	—	2–1	0–1	3–1
Dinamo Tirana	1–0	—	1–0	2–1
Korabi	1–1	1–2	—	3–1
Vora	0–3	0–2	1–5	—

Source: Soccerway
Legend: Blue = home team win; Yellow = draw; Red = away team win.
For upcoming matches, an "a" indicates there is an article about the rivalry between the two participants.

==== Group B ====
===== Table =====
Pos	Team	Pld	W	D	L	GF	GA	GD	Pts	Promotion
1	Egnatia (C, P)	20	14	4	2	36	10	+26	46	Promotion to 2021–22 Kategoria Superiore
2	Tomori	20	12	4	4	36	20	+16	40	Play-off promotion to 2021–22 Kategoria Superiore
3	Pogradeci	20	10	3	7	32	26	+6	33	
4	Besa	20	7	3	10	26	26	0	24	

Source: Soccerway
Rules for classification: 1) points; 2) head-to-head points; 3) head-to-head goal difference; 4) goal difference; 5) number of goals scored; 6) draw. (Head-to-head record is applied for clubs with the same number of points only once all matches between said clubs have been played.)
(C) Champions; (P) Promoted

===== Results =====
Home \ Away	BES	EGN	POG	TOM
Besa	—	0–2	1–2	2–4
Egnatia	1–0	—	4–2	2–1
Pogradeci	1–3	0–1	—	2–2
Tomori	3–1	2–1	1–1	—

Source: Soccerway
Legend: Blue = home team win; Yellow = draw; Red = away team win.
For upcoming matches, an "a" indicates there is an article about the rivalry between the two participants.

=== Relegation round ===
==== Group A ====
===== Table =====
Pos	Team	Pld	W	D	L	GF	GA	GD	Pts	Relegation
5	Besëlidhja	24	10	6	8	32	26	+6	36	
6	Erzeni	24	9	7	8	29	22	+7	34	
7	Oriku (R)	24	9	4	11	18	21	−3	31	Play-out relegation to 2021–22 Kategoria e Dytë
8	Partizani B (Note: Partizani B was dissolved after the season due to the foundation of the U21 Albanian Championship.) (D)	24	6	6	12	26	38	−12	24	Dissolved after the season
9	Veleçiku (R)	24	2	5	17	17	46	−29	11	Relegation to 2021–22 Kategoria e Dytë

Source: Soccerway
Rules for classification: 1) points; 2) head-to-head points; 3) head-to-head goal difference; 4) goal difference; 5) number of goals scored; 6) draw. (Head-to-head record is applied for clubs with the same number of points only once all matches between said clubs have been played.)
(D) Dissolved after the season; (R) Relegated

===== Results =====
Home \ Away	BSË	ERZ	PAR	ORI	VEL
Besëlidhja	—	4–4	3–1	1–0	2–1
Erzeni	2–0	—	2–1	0–0	2–2
Partizani B	0–1	1–2	—	0–1	4–2
Oriku	1–0	1–0	2–3	—	3–0
Veleçiku	0–2	0–2	0–2	2–3	—

Source: Soccerway
Legend: Blue = home team win; Yellow = draw; Red = away team win.
For upcoming matches, an "a" indicates there is an article about the rivalry between the two participants.

==== Group B ====
===== Table =====
Pos	Team	Pld	W	D	L	GF	GA	GD	Pts	Relegation
5	Lushnja	20	7	7	6	21	25	−4	28	
6	Turbina	20	6	7	7	23	24	−1	25	
7	Flamurtari (Note: Flamurtari were deducted 3 points for failing to fulfill financial obligations.) (R)	20	5	2	13	14	30	−16	14	Play-out relegation to 2021–22 Kategoria e Dytë
8	Elbasani (R)	20	3	2	15	13	40	−27	11	Relegation to 2021–22 Kategoria e Dytë

Source: Soccerway
Rules for classification: 1) points; 2) head-to-head points; 3) head-to-head goal difference; 4) goal difference; 5) number of goals scored; 6) draw. (Head-to-head record is applied for clubs with the same number of points only once all matches between said clubs have been played.)
(R) Relegated

===== Results =====
Home \ Away	ELB	FLA	LUS	TUR
Elbasani	—	2–0	0–1	4–3
Flamurtari	0–1	—	2–0	3–1
Lushnja	1–1	2–2	—	1–0
Turbina	1–0	4–0	0–0	—

Source: Soccerway
Legend: Blue = home team win; Yellow = draw; Red = away team win.
For upcoming matches, an "a" indicates there is an article about the rivalry between the two participants.

== Final ==
22 May 2021
17:00

Dinamo Tirana	0−1	Egnatia
		Shtubina 90+3'

Elbasan Arena, Elbasan
Referee: Blerim Ziri

== Promotion play-off ==
26 May 2021
16:00

Burreli	1−2	Tomori
Raboshta 66' (pen.)		Canka 32'; Barjamaj 55'

Elbasan Arena, Elbasan

Tomori qualified to the final play-off match.

== Relegation play-offs ==
5 June 2021
16:00

Oriku	0−1	Butrinti
		Gurma 22'

Selman Stërmasi Stadium, Tirana
Referee: Albano Stolaj

Butrinti was promoted to the Kategoria e Parë, while Oriku was relegated to the Kategoria e Dytë.

6 June 2021
16:00

Flamurtari	0−0 (a.e.t.)	Tërbuni
Penalties
Diamanti (penalty scored); Balilaj (penalty scored); Kreshpa (penalty scored); Moçka (penalty scored); Ribaj (penalty missed)	4−5	(penalty scored) Miloti; (penalty scored) Zagani; (penalty scored) Metani; (penalty scored) Keko; (penalty scored) Mezini

Elbasan Arena, Elbasan
Referee: Olsi Sokoli

Tërbuni was promoted to the Kategoria e Parë, while Flamurtari was relegated to the Kategoria e Dytë.

== Season statistics ==
=== Scoring ===
==== Top scorers ====
Rank	Player	Club	Goals
1	(Albania) Mikel Canka	Tomori	15
2	(Albania) Xhuliano Skuka	Korabi	14
3	(Albania) Artur Magani	Egnatia	11
4	(Albania) Ndriçim Shtubina	Egnatia	10
5	(Brazil) Maranhão	Dinamo Tirana	9
5	(Cameroon) Moustapha Djidjiwa	Dinamo Tirana	9
7	(Albania) Brunild Pepa	Tomori	8
7	(Albania) Gersi Diamanti	Flamurtari	8
7	(Albania) Odeon Bërdufi	Partizani B	8
