= 2024–25 Kategoria e Tretë =

Football league in Albania

Kategoria e Tretë
- Season: 2024–25
- Champions: Bylis B 1st title
- Promoted: Bylis B Eagle FA; Partizani B Shiroka
- Matches: 113
- Goals: 426 (3.77 per match)
- Top goalscorer: Alatin Ametlli (11 goals)
- Biggest home win: Labëria 8−0 Skrapari (4 December 2024); Partizani B 9−1 Himara (8 December 2024)
- Biggest away win: Tepelena 0−5 Albpetrol (15 December 2024)
- Highest scoring: Eagle FA 7−3 Olimpic Shkodra (1 December 2024); Partizani B 9−1 Himara (8 December 2024)
- Longest winning run: 9 matches Bylis B
- Longest unbeaten run: 14 matches Eagle FA
- Longest winless run: 12 matches Himara
- Longest losing run: 11 matches Himara

The 2024–25 Kategoria e Tretë was the 22nd official season of the Albanian football fourth division since its establishment. The season began on 16 November 2024 and ended on 30 April 2025. There were 16 teams competing this season, split in 2 groups. Bylis B, Eagle FA, Partizani B and Shiroka gained promotion to the 2025–26 Kategoria e Dytë.

== Changes from last season ==
=== Team changes ===
==== From Kategoria e Tretë ====
Promoted to Kategoria e Dytë:

- Basania
- Memaliaj

==== To Kategoria e Tretë ====
Relegated from Kategoria e Dytë:

- Labëria
2024–25 Kategoria e Tretë teams:
Group A; Group B

=== Stadia by capacity and locations ===
==== Group A ====
Team	Location	Stadium	Capacity
Bulqiza	Bulqizë	National Sports Centre	50
Eagle FA	Tirana	Skënder Halili Complex	
Europiani	Tirana	National Sports Centre	50
Himara	Himarë	Skënder Halili Complex	
Klosi	Klos	Dali Farruku Pitch	
Olimpic Shkodra	Shkodër	Zmijani Complex	
Partizani B	Tirana	Arena e Demave	4,500
Shiroka	Shirokë	Reshit Rusi Stadium	1,200

==== Group B ====
Team	Location	Stadium	Capacity
Albpetrol	Patos	Alush Noga Stadium	2,150
Bylis B	Ballsh	Bylis Football Academy	
Gramozi	Ersekë	Ersekë Stadium	2,000
Labëria	Vlorë	Labëria Complex	
Osumi	Ura Vajgurore	Osumi Stadium	
Përmeti	Përmet	Durim Qypi Stadium	4,000
Skrapari	Çorovodë	Skrapar Sports Field	1,500
Tepelena	Tepelenë	Sabaudin Shehu Stadium	2,000

== League standings ==
=== Group A ===
Pos	Team	Pld	W	D	L	GF	GA	GD	Pts	Promotion
1	Eagle FA (P)	14	10	4	0	32	11	+21	34	Promotion to 2025–26 Kategoria e Dytë
2	Partizani B (O, P)	14	10	2	2	48	11	+37	32	Play-off promotion to 2025–26 Kategoria e Dytë
3	Shiroka (Note: Shiroka was promoted in order to replace Albanët, after their withdrawal from the 2025–26 Kategoria e Dytë.) (P)	14	8	2	4	31	17	+14	26	Promotion to 2025–26 Kategoria e Dytë
4	Bulqiza	14	7	2	5	31	25	+6	23	
5	Klosi	14	6	2	6	25	28	−3	20	
6	Europiani	14	4	4	6	16	22	−6	16	
7	Himara	14	1	1	12	14	48	−34	4	
8	Olimpic Shkodra	14	1	1	12	12	47	−35	4	

Rules for classification: 1) points; 2) head-to-head points; 3) head-to-head goal difference; 4) goal difference; 5) number of goals scored; 6) draw. (Head-to-head record is applied for clubs with the same number of points only once all matches between said clubs have been played.)
(O) Play-off winners; (P) Promoted

=== Results ===
Home \ Away	BUL	EAG	EUR	HIM	KLO	OLI	PAR	SHI
Bulqiza	—	1–1	6–1	1–1	3–4	4–1	4–3	1–3
Eagle FA	4–1	—	1–0	3–2	2–0	7–3	1–0	1–0
Europiani	1–2	0–0	—	2–1	2–2	3–0	1–1	0–1
Himara	0–1	1–4	0–3	—	0–3	3–1	1–5	2–6
Klosi	1–4	1–1	2–0	3–0	—	5–0	0–3	1–2
Olimpic Shkodra	1–2	0–4	0–2	2–1	1–2	—	0–1	1–5
Partizani B	2–0	1–1	5–0	9–1	6–1	7–1	—	4–0
Shiroka	2–1	1–2	1–1	5–1	4–0	1–1	0–1	—

Legend: Blue = home team win; Yellow = draw; Red = away team win.
For upcoming matches, an "a" indicates there is an article about the rivalry between the two participants.

=== Group B ===
Pos	Team	Pld	W	D	L	GF	GA	GD	Pts	Promotion
1	Bylis B (C, P)	14	12	0	2	42	20	+22	36	Promotion to 2025–26 Kategoria e Dytë
2	Albpetrol	14	10	3	1	35	11	+24	33	Play-off promotion to 2025–26 Kategoria e Dytë
3	Gramozi	14	9	3	2	34	15	+19	30	
4	Osumi	14	6	0	8	21	25	−4	18	
5	Labëria	14	5	2	7	32	25	+7	17	
6	Përmeti	14	4	3	7	20	27	−7	15	
7	Skrapari	14	2	1	11	12	45	−33	7	
8	Tepelena	14	2	0	12	16	44	−28	6	

Rules for classification: 1) points; 2) head-to-head points; 3) head-to-head goal difference; 4) goal difference; 5) number of goals scored; 6) draw. (Head-to-head record is applied for clubs with the same number of points only once all matches between said clubs have been played.)
(C) Champions; (P) Promoted

=== Results ===
Home \ Away	ALB	BYL	GRA	LAB	OSU	PËR	SKR	TEP
Albpetrol	—	1–0	1–1	2–0	5–2	2–0	5–0	2–1
Bylis B	2–0	—	3–1	5–4	2–1	5–3	5–2	4–1
Gramozi	1–1	4–1	—	4–1	2–0	3–1	5–0	6–2
Labëria	4–4	0–2	0–1	—	0–1	1–1	8–0	6–0
Osumi	0–3	1–3	3–1	1–3	—	2–1	5–0	1–0
Përmeti	0–1	0–4	0–0	4–2	0–2	—	2–0	3–1
Skrapari	0–3	1–4	0–1	0–2	3–1	1–1	—	3–0
Tepelena	0–5	1–2	2–4	0–1	2–1	3–4	3–2	—

Legend: Blue = home team win; Yellow = draw; Red = away team win.
For upcoming matches, an "a" indicates there is an article about the rivalry between the two participants.

== Final ==
30 April 2025
20:00

Bylis B	3−2	Eagle FA
Kasaj 7'; Sulovari 21'; Akibu 51'		Ysolliu 32'; Bardhi 66'

Shtëpia e Futbollit, Tirana

== Promotion play-off ==
14 April 2025
15:00

Partizani B	3−0	Albpetrol
Ndrejaj 53'; Guxhufi 63'; Nyanguila 66'

Vora Stadium, Vorë
Referee: Albano Stolaj

Partizani B qualified to the final play-off match.

== Top scorers ==
Rank	Player	Club	Goals
1	(Albania) Alatin Ametlli	Gramozi	11
2	(Albania) Vilson Mziu	Bulqiza	10
3	(Syria) Mohanad Mando	Partizani B	9
4	(Albania) Donald Kurbneshi	Klosi	8
4	(Brazil) Igor	Bylis B	8
6	(Albania) Devis Meçollari	Gramozi	7
6	(Albania) Kleo Pelo	Gramozi	7
6	(Albania) Redjon Kardhashi	Albpetrol	7
