= 2014–15 Kategoria e Dytë =

Kategoria e Dytë
- Season: 2014–15

The 2014–15 Kategoria e Dytë, an Albanian association football league competition, was composed of 25 teams in 2 groups, A and B, respectively.

== Changes from last season ==
=== Team changes ===
==== From Kategoria e Dytë ====
Promoted to Kategoria e Parë:

- Iliria
- Sopoti
- Besëlidhja
- Naftëtari

==== To Kategoria e Dytë ====
Relegated from Kategoria e Parë:

- Albpetrol
- Himara

Promoted from Kategoria e Tretë:

- Tirana B

== Participating teams ==
Group A

Team	City/Zone
Albpetrol	Patos
Domozdova	Prrenjas
Erzeni	Shijak
Korabi	Peshkopi
Luzi 2008	Luz i Vogël
Olimpic	Tirana
Partizani B	Tirana
Shënkolli	Shënkoll
Skrapari	Skrapar
Sukthi	Sukth
Teuta B	Durrës
Tirana B	Tirana
Vora	Vorë

Group B

Team	City/Zone
Bilisht Sport	Bilisht
Delvina	Delvinë
Egnatia	Rrogozhinë
Gramozi	Ersekë
Gramshi	Gramsh
Himara	Himarë
Këlcyra	Këlcyrë
Memaliaj	Memaliaj
Oriku	Orikum
Përmeti	Përmet
Tepelena	Tepelenë
Turbina	Cërrik

== League tables ==
=== Group A ===
Pos	Team	Pld	W	D	L	GF	GA	GD	Pts	Promotion or relegation
1	Korabi (P)	24	22	1	1	45	12	+33	67	Promotion to 2015–16 Kategoria e Parë
2	Erzeni (P)	24	20	1	3	65	23	+42	61	Play-off promotion to 2015–16 Kategoria e Parë
3	Partizani B	24	15	4	5	43	16	+27	49	
4	Luzi 2008	24	13	3	8	34	19	+15	42	
5	Vora	24	9	7	8	38	30	+8	34	
6	Shënkolli	24	9	5	10	38	33	+5	32	
7	Sukthi (Note: Sukthi were deducted 3 points from classification for activating a player who had no right to play in the game against Korabi on 22 February 2015 and also Korabi were awarded with a 3-0 win.)	24	9	4	11	33	33	0	28	
8	Albpetrol	24	7	7	10	27	29	−2	28	
9	Tirana B	24	7	6	11	44	50	−6	27	
10	Domozdova	24	6	2	16	26	53	−27	20	
11	Teuta B (R)	24	5	4	15	28	42	−14	19	Relegation to 2015–16 Kategoria e Tretë
12	Skrapari	24	4	4	16	22	69	−47	16	
13	Olimpic (Note: Olimpic were deducted 3 points from classification for activating a player who had no right to play in the game against Shënkolli on 22 February 2015 and also Shënkolli were awarded with a 3-0 win.) (R)	24	4	4	16	34	68	−34	13	Relegation to 2015–16 Kategoria e Tretë

Source: Soccerway
Rules for classification: 1) points; 2) goal difference; 3) number of goals scored; 4) head-to-head points; 5) head-to-head goal difference; 6) draw. (Head-to-head record is applied for clubs with the same number of points only once all matches between said clubs have been played.)
(P) Promoted; (R) Relegated

=== Group B ===
Pos	Team	Pld	W	D	L	GF	GA	GD	Pts	Promotion or relegation
1	Gramshi (Note: Gramshi were declined the promotion to the Kategoria e Parë.) (C)	22	18	4	0	53	15	+38	58	Promotion to 2015–16 Kategoria e Parë
2	Turbina (P)	22	14	4	4	37	17	+20	46	Play-off promotion to 2015–16 Kategoria e Parë
3	Oriku	22	13	3	6	39	20	+19	42	
4	Memaliaj	22	12	3	7	33	23	+10	39	
5	Tepelena	22	9	6	7	41	33	+8	33	
6	Bilisht Sport	22	8	3	11	33	36	−3	27	
7	Delvina	22	8	1	13	28	31	−3	25	
8	Himara	22	8	1	13	34	40	−6	25	
9	Egnatia	22	7	2	13	24	37	−13	23	
10	Gramozi	22	6	4	12	24	47	−23	22	
11	Përmeti	22	6	3	13	22	36	−14	21	
12	Këlcyra (R)	22	5	2	15	19	52	−33	17	Relegation to 2015–16 Kategoria e Tretë

Source: Soccerway
Rules for classification: 1) points; 2) goal difference; 3) number of goals scored; 4) head-to-head points; 5) head-to-head goal difference; 6) draw. (Head-to-head record is applied for clubs with the same number of points only once all matches between said clubs have been played.)
(C) Champions; (P) Promoted; (R) Relegated

== Final ==
23 May 2015
17:00

Korabi	1−3	Gramshi

Qemal Stafa Stadium, Tirana

== See also ==
- Football in Albania
