= 2025–26 Kategoria e Dytë =

Kategoria e Dytë
- Season: 2025–26
- Champions: Besëlidhja; 2nd title
- Promoted: Besëlidhja; Oriku; Sopoti
- Relegated: Adriatiku; Shkumbini
- Matches: 220
- Goals: 665 (3.02 per match)
- Top goalscorer: Jasmin Raboshta (16 goals)
- Biggest home win: Besëlidhja 10−0 Adriatiku (6 December 2025)
- Biggest away win: Adriatiku 1−9 Besëlidhja (4 April 2026)
- Highest scoring: Adriatiku 1−9 Besëlidhja (4 April 2026); Besëlidhja 10−0 Adriatiku (6 December 2025)
- Longest winning run: 8 matches Besëlidhja
- Longest unbeaten run: 20 matches Besëlidhja
- Longest winless run: 20 matches Adriatiku
- Longest losing run: 16 matches Adriatiku

The 2025–26 Kategoria e Dytë is the 56th official season of the Albanian football third division since its establishment. There are 23 teams competing this season, split in 2 groups. The winners of the groups play the league's final against each other and also gain promotion to the 2026–27 Kategoria e Parë. Teams ranked from the 2nd to the 5th position qualify to the play-off round where the winners will play against the 9th and 10th ranked teams in the 2025–26 Kategoria e Parë.

== Changes from last season ==
=== Team changes ===
==== From Kategoria e Dytë ====
Promoted to Kategoria e Parë:

- Iliria
- Luftëtari

Relegated to Kategoria e Tretë:

- Memaliaj
- Murlani
- Turbina

==== To Kategoria e Dytë ====
Relegated from Kategoria e Parë:

- Erzeni
- Valbona

Promoted from Kategoria e Tretë:

- Bylis B
- Eagle FA
- Partizani B
- Shiroka

=== Locations ===
2025–26 Group A Kategoria e Dytë teams.
2025–26 Group B Kategoria e Dytë teams.

==== Group A ====
Team	Location	Stadium	Capacity
Adriatiku	Katund i Ri	Various	
Basania	Bushat	Basania Stadium	
Besëlidhja	Lezhë	Brian Filipi Stadium	5,000
Erzeni	Shijak	Tofik Jashari Stadium	4,000
Gramshi	Gramsh	Nexhip Trungu Stadium	6,600
Luzi 2008	Luz i Vogël	Luz i Vogël Stadium	600
Naftëtari	Kuçovë	Bashkim Sulejmani Stadium	5,000
Shiroka	Shirokë	Reshit Rusi Stadium	1,200
Sopoti	Librazhd	Sopoti Stadium	3,000
Tërbuni	Pukë	Ismail Xhemali Stadium	1,950
Valbona	Bajram Curri	Vëllezërit Gega Stadium	1,900
Veleçiku	Koplik	Kompleksi Vëllezërit Duli	2,000

==== Group B ====
Team	Location	Stadium	Capacity
Butrinti	Sarandë	Andon Lapa Stadium	5,500
Bylis B	Ballsh	Adush Muçaj Stadium	2,464
Delvina	Delvinë	Panajot Pano Stadium	2,500
Devolli	Bilisht	Bilisht Stadium	3,000
Eagle FA	Tirana	Various	
Këlcyra	Këlcyrë	Demir Allamani Stadium	1,000
Maliqi	Maliq	Jovan Asko Stadium	1,500
Oriku	Orikum	Orikum Stadium	2,000
Partizani B	Tirana	Arena e Demave	4,500
Shkumbini	Peqin	Shkumbini Stadium	9,000
Tomori	Berat	Tomori Stadium	19,230

== League standings ==
=== Group A ===
Pos	Team	Pld	W	D	L	GF	GA	GD	Pts	Promotion or relegation
1	Besëlidhja (C, P)	20	17	3	0	61	7	+54	54	Promotion to 2026–27 Kategoria e Parë
2	Sopoti (O, P)	20	15	3	2	45	13	+32	48	Play-off promotion to 2026–27 Kategoria e Parë
3	Shiroka	20	13	2	5	44	17	+27	41	Play-off promotion to 2026–27 Kategoria e Parë
4	Erzeni	20	9	4	7	21	16	+5	31	Play-off promotion to 2026–27 Kategoria e Parë
5	Tërbuni	20	8	5	7	20	22	−2	29	Play-off promotion to 2026–27 Kategoria e Parë
6	Luzi 2008	20	9	0	11	35	33	+2	27	
7	Veleçiku	20	7	4	9	34	35	−1	25	
8	Naftëtari	20	7	3	10	23	25	−2	24	
9	Gramshi	20	6	5	9	27	34	−7	23	
10	Basania	20	2	4	14	20	47	−27	10	
11	Adriatiku (R)	20	0	1	19	7	88	−81	1	Play-off relegation to 2026–27 Kategoria e Tretë
12	Valbona	0	0	0	0	0	0	0	0	Withdrew

Rules for classification: 1) points; 2) head-to-head points; 3) head-to-head goal difference; 4) goal difference; 5) number of goals scored; 6) draw. (Head-to-head record is applied for clubs with the same number of points only once all matches between said clubs have been played.)
(C) Champions; (O) Play-off winners; (P) Promoted; (R) Relegated

==== Results ====
Home \ Away	ADR	BAS	BES	ERZ	GRA	LUZ	NAF	SHI	SOP	TËR	VEL
Adriatiku	—	2–2	1–9	0–5	1–6	0–6	0–4	0–3	0–4	0–3	0–1
Basania	6–0	—	0–2	0–1	0–0	3–2	0–2	0–4	0–3	0–1	2–2
Besëlidhja	10–0	3–0	—	2–0	2–1	3–0	2–0	3–0	1–1	2–0	4–1
Erzeni	1–0	2–1	0–1	—	2–1	2–0	0–0	0–1	1–3	0–0	0–0
Gramshi	2–1	4–0	0–2	0–2	—	3–1	1–2	2–1	0–3	1–0	2–2
Luzi 2008	3–1	3–1	1–6	1–2	3–0	—	1–0	3–1	1–4	2–0	4–1
Naftëtari	3–0	3–3	0–2	1–2	1–1	2–1	—	0–3	0–1	1–0	3–1
Shiroka	9–0	3–1	1–1	1–0	6–1	0–2	1–0	—	1–0	3–0	3–1
Sopoti	4–1	2–0	1–1	1–0	3–0	2–1	3–0	1–0	—	3–0	3–0
Tërbuni	2–0	2–0	0–2	0–0	1–1	1–0	1–0	1–1	3–3	—	4–3
Veleçiku	5–0	6–1	0–3	3–1	1–1	1–0	2–1	1–2	3–0	0–1	—

Legend: Blue = home team win; Yellow = draw; Red = away team win.
For upcoming matches, an "a" indicates there is an article about the rivalry between the two participants.

=== Group B ===
Pos	Team	Pld	W	D	L	GF	GA	GD	Pts	Promotion or relegation
1	Oriku (P)	20	14	4	2	40	10	+30	46	Promotion to 2026–27 Kategoria e Parë
2	Butrinti	20	14	2	4	35	16	+19	44	Play-off promotion to 2026–27 Kategoria e Parë
3	Bylis B	20	12	5	3	34	19	+15	41	Play-off promotion to 2026–27 Kategoria e Parë
4	Partizani B	20	12	3	5	44	20	+24	39	Play-off promotion to 2026–27 Kategoria e Parë
5	Maliqi	20	7	4	9	28	34	−6	25	Play-off promotion to 2026–27 Kategoria e Parë
6	Tomori	20	6	4	10	27	32	−5	22	
7	Eagle FA	20	5	7	8	28	36	−8	22	
8	Devolli	20	6	3	11	24	45	−21	21	
9	Delvina	20	6	2	12	26	38	−12	20	
10	Këlcyra (O)	20	5	3	12	22	40	−18	18	Play-off relegation to 2026–27 Kategoria e Tretë
11	Shkumbini (Note: Shkumbini were excluded from the competition and relegated to the Kategoria e Tretë after abandoning a match against Këlcyra on the 19th round.) (D, R)	20	3	3	14	20	38	−18	12	Excluded

Rules for classification: 1) points; 2) head-to-head points; 3) head-to-head goal difference; 4) goal difference; 5) number of goals scored; 6) draw.
(D) Disqualified; (O) Play-off winners; (P) Promoted; (R) Relegated

==== Results ====
Home \ Away	BUT	BYL	DEL	DEV	EAG	KËL	MAL	ORI	PAR	SHK	TOM
Butrinti	—	1–0	2–0	3–0	3–0	2–1	1–0	2–0	4–2	2–0	3–2
Bylis B	2–1	—	2–0	5–3	3–2	5–0	2–0	0–2	0–3	1–0	2–0
Delvina	1–0	1–1	—	4–1	0–2	2–3	4–0	0–3	0–2	1–0	1–1
Devolli	1–2	1–1	2–3	—	2–1	1–0	2–1	0–1	1–6	1–0	4–3
Eagle FA	0–3	2–3	2–0	1–1	—	1–1	1–1	0–2	2–1	1–3	2–2
Këlcyra	1–2	1–1	2–1	0–1	1–3	—	3–2	0–1	2–2	3–0	2–0
Maliqi	1–1	0–1	3–2	2–1	2–2	3–1	—	1–1	0–2	2–1	3–0
Oriku	3–0	1–1	4–2	4–0	2–2	5–0	2–0	—	0–1	4–0	0–0
Partizani B	0–0	0–2	6–2	5–0	5–0	1–0	1–2	1–2	—	2–1	1–0
Shkumbini	0–2	1–1	1–2	1–1	0–3	4–1	1–3	0–1	2–2	—	3–2
Tomori	2–1	0–1	1–0	2–1	1–1	3–0	5–2	0–2	0–1	3–2	—

Legend: Blue = home team win; Yellow = draw; Red = away team win.
For upcoming matches, an "a" indicates there is an article about the rivalry between the two participants.

== Final ==
25 April 2026
17:00

Besëlidhja	2−0	Oriku
Qurbanov 21'; Raboshta 60'

Niko Dovana Stadium, Durrës
Referee: Enis Dishani

== Group A Promotion play-offs ==
Semi-finals
Sopoti	3
Tërbuni	1
Shiroka	2
Erzeni	1

Final
Sopoti	1 (4)
Shiroka	1 (2)

== Semi-finals ==
25 April 2026
15:00

Sopoti	3−1	Tërbuni
Aminu 12'; Amoumane Inkad 45'; Goçi 60'		Adames Lucena 6'

Sopoti Stadium, Librazhd
Referee: Xhuljan Bacaj

25 April 2026
15:00

Shiroka	2−1	Erzeni
Ogungbire 36', 87'		Dragoj 45'

Reshit Rusi Stadium, Shkodër
Referee: Sokol Bebja

== Final ==
3 May 2026
15:00

Sopoti	1−1 (a.e.t.)	Shiroka
Ferhati 30'		Ogungbire 14'
Penalties
Tabaku (penalty scored); Aminu (penalty missed); Atanda (penalty scored); Jargavani (penalty scored); Troksi (penalty scored)	4−2	(penalty scored) Kalaja; (penalty scored) Dibra; (penalty missed) Kapllanaj; (penalty missed) Hasaj

Selman Stërmasi Stadium, Tirana
Referee: Dorjan Maletaj

Sopoti qualified to the final play-off match.

== Group B Promotion play-offs ==
Semi-finals
Butrinti	2
Maliqi	0
Bylis B	3
Partizani B	2

Final
Butrinti	0 (4)
Bylis B	0 (5)

== Semi-finals ==
25 April 2026
15:00

Butrinti	2−0	Maliqi
Kolonja 45', 58'

Andon Lapa Stadium, Sarandë
Referee: Ardit Merdanaj

27 April 2026
16:00

Bylis B	3−2	Partizani B
Akibu 18'; Hodo 65'; Deliu 90+6'		Balla 86'; Goga 90+2' (pen.)

Bylis Football Academy, Ballsh
Referee: Granit Sulko

== Final ==
3 May 2026
15:00

Butrinti	0−0 (a.e.t.)	Bylis B
Penalties
Mendoza (penalty scored); Gjata (penalty scored); Diop (penalty scored); Avduli (penalty missed); Çulli (penalty scored)	4−5	(penalty scored) Sulovari; (penalty scored) Igor; (penalty scored) Marku; (penalty scored) Ofori; (penalty scored) Pjeshka

Luz i Vogël Stadium, Luz i Vogël
Referee: Gerald Çokaj

Butrinti qualified to the final play-off match instead of Bylis B, due to Bylis A team's relegation to Kategoria e Parë.

== Relegation play-offs ==
26 April 2026
15:00

Adriatiku	1−5	Këlcyra
Hasani 51'		Lartey Gbebi 4'; Yakubu 14', 59'; Shehu 26', 39'

Fusha e Vjetër, Kavajë
Referee: Bekris Dragusha

10 May 2026
15:00

Adriatiku	0−5	Memaliaj
		Saraçi 29'; Hysi 63'; Jaupi 70'; Mirani 76'; Soumahoro 85'

Luz i Vogël Stadium, Luz i Vogël

Adriatiku was relegated to Kategoria e Tretë, while Memaliaj was promoted to Kategoria e Dytë.

== Top scorers ==
Rank	Player	Club	Goals
1	(Albania) Jasmin Raboshta	Besëlidhja	16
2	(Albania) Jurgen Gjini	Basania/Veleçiku	14
3	(Ghana) Emmanuel Akansase	Besëlidhja	13
4	(Nigeria) Gabriel Ogungbire	Shiroka	12
5	(Nigeria) Ahmed Aminu	Sopoti	11
5	(Albania) Rabjon Goga	Partizani B	11
