= Rajan Guçi =

Albanian footballer

Personal information
- Date of birth: 13 March 2006 (age 20)
- Place of birth: Durrës, Albania
- Height: 1.95 m (6 ft 5 in)
- Position: Goalkeeper

Team information
- Current team: Erzeni
- Number: 12

Youth career
- 2014–2022: Teuta
- 2022–2024: Dinamo City

Senior career*
Years	Team	Apps	(Gls)
2024–2026	Dinamo City	0	(0)
2025	→ Dinamo City B	6	(0)
2026–	Erzeni	7	(0)
- * Club domestic league appearances and goals as of 6 November 2026

Rajan Guçi (born 13 March 2006) is an Albanian footballer who plays as a goalkeeper for Kategoria e Dytë club Erzeni.

== Club career ==
=== Youth career ===
Guçi began his football career with Teuta in 2014, progressing through the club's youth system. During his time there, he represented the club in youth competitions, including the under-15 and under-17 categories. In January 2022, he joined Dinamo City, where he continued his development across the club's youth teams, including its under-17, under-19 and under-21 sides.

During the 2022–23 season, Guçi featured for Dinamo's under-21 team in the Kategoria Superiore U-21, including an appearance against Tirana on 27 March 2023. He subsequently represented the club's under-19 side, featuring in its 2–1 victory over Apolonia on 24 November 2024.

=== Dinamo City ===
Guçi was first included in Dinamo City's senior matchday squad towards the end of the 2023–24 Kategoria Superiore, making the matchday squad in May 2024. He remained part of the senior setup during the following 2024–25 season, when he was included in the matchday squad on 13 occasions, although he did not make a competitive first-team appearance.

During the 2025–26 UEFA Conference League qualifying campaign, Guçi was included in Dinamo's squad for its European fixtures. On 4 August 2025, he was named among the club's three goalkeepers in the squad submitted to UEFA for the third qualifying-round tie against Hajduk Split.

Alongside his involvement with the senior squad, Guçi also featured for Dinamo City B during the first half of the 2025–26 season. He made six appearances in Group A of the Albanian Third Division between October and November 2025.

=== Erzeni ===
In January 2026, Guçi joined Erzeni, who were competing in the Kategoria e Dytë. During the remainder of the season, the club qualified for the Group A promotion play-offs. On 25 April 2026, Erzeni faced Shiroka in the semi-finals, where it was eliminated following a 2–1 defeat.

On 7 October 2026, Guçi started in Erzeni's 3–2 defeat to Kukësi in the Albanian Cup. The result eliminated Erzeni from the competition.

== Career statistics ==
=== Club ===
As of match played 6 November 2026

Appearances and goals by club, season and competition
Club	Season	League			Cup		Other		Total	
Club	Season	Division	Apps	Goals	Apps	Goals	Apps	Goals	Apps	Goals
Dinamo City	2023–24	Kategoria Superiore	0	0	—		—		0	0
Dinamo City	2024–25	Kategoria Superiore	0	0	—		—		0	0
Dinamo City	2025–26	Kategoria Superiore	0	0	—		6 (Note: Appearance(s) with Dinamo City B)	0	6	0
Dinamo City	Total		0	0	—		6	0	6	0
Erzeni	2025–26	Kategoria e Dytë	1	0	—		—		1	0
Erzeni	2026–27	Kategoria e Dytë	6	0	1	0	—		7	0
Erzeni	Total		7	0	1	0	—		8	0
Career total			7	0	1	0	6	0	14	0
