= Kategoria e Dytë =

- Organising body: FSHF
- Founded: 1960
- Country: Albania
- Confederation: UEFA
- Number of clubs: 23
- Level on pyramid: 3
- Promotion to: Kategoria e Parë
- Relegation to: Kategoria e Tretë
- Domestic cup: Albanian Cup
- Current champions: Besëlidhja (2nd title) (2025–26)
- Most championships: Tërbuni (4) titles
- Website: Official site
- Current: 2026–27 Kategoria e Dytë

Kategoria e Dytë is the third tier of professional football in Albania’s league system. Known as the Second Division since the 2004–05 season, it consists of 23 teams split into two geographically-based groups. The winners of each group secure promotion to Kategoria e Parë and face off in the final to determine the season’s overall champion. Meanwhile, the last positioned teams in each group are relegated to Kategoria e Tretë.

== Clubs (2026–27) ==
Location of teams in 2026–27 Kategoria e Dytë:
Group A; Group B

=== Group A ===
Team	Location	Stadium	Capacity
Basania	Bushat	Basania Stadium	
Eagle FA	Tirana		
Erzeni	Shijak	Tofik Jashari Stadium	1,500
Gramshi	Gramsh	Myslim Koçi Stadium	3,100
Lushnja	Lushnjë	Roza Haxhiu Stadium	8,500
Luzi 2008	Luz i Vogël	Luz i Vogël Stadium	549
Naftëtari	Kuçovë	Bashkim Sulejmani Stadium	5,000
Partizani B	Tirana	Arena e Demave	3,959
Shiroka	Shirokë	Reshit Rusi Stadium	1,200
Tërbuni	Pukë	Ismail Xhemali Stadium	1,950
Veleçiku	Koplik	Kompleksi Vëllezërit Duli	2,000
Vllaznia	Shkodër	Reshit Rusi Stadium	1,200

=== Group B ===
Team	Location	Stadium	Capacity
Albpetrol	Patos	Alush Noga Stadium	2,150
Apolonia	Fier	Loni Papuçiu Stadium	3,159
Butrinti	Sarandë	Andon Lapa Stadium	5,500
Bylis B	Ballsh	Adush Muçaj Stadium	2,464
Delvina	Delvinë	Panajot Pano Stadium	2,500
Devolli	Bilisht	Bilisht Stadium	3,000
Këlcyra	Këlcyrë	Demir Allamani Stadium	1,000
Luftëtari	Gjirokastër	Gjirokastra Stadium	8,400
Maliqi	Maliq	Jovan Asko Stadium	1,500
Memaliaj	Memaliaj	Karafil Çaushi Stadium	1,500
Tomori	Berat	Tomori Stadium	19,230

== Champions ==
Year	Champions	Runners-up	Top scorer	Goals
~~1953~~	Season was suspended			
1956	Puna Peshkopi	Puna Shijak		
1957	Puna Lezhë	Puna Himarë		
1958	Erzeni Shijak	Rrethi i Tiranës		
1959	Përparimi Kukës	Ylli i Kuq Pogradec		
1960	Ylli i Kuq			
1961	Butrinti			
1962	Erzeni			
1962–63	Punëtori			
1963–64	Tërbuni			
1964–65	Punëtori			
1965–66	Tërbuni			
1966–67	Përparimi			
1968	22 Tetori			
~~1969–73~~	Seasons were not played			
1973–74	24 Maji	Gramozi		
1974–75	Vetëtima	Industriali		
1975–76	Minatori	5 Shtatori		
1976–77	Përparimi	10 Korriku		
1977–78	Korabi	Kastrioti		
1978–79	Shkumbini	Punëtori		
1979–80	Butrinti	Tërbuni		
1980–81	Erzeni	Minatori		
1981–82	Përparimi	Bistrica		
1982–83	Korabi	Turbina		
1983–84	Sopoti	24 Maji		
1984–85	Ylli i Kuq	5 Shtatori		
1985–86	Ballsh i Ri	Përparimi		
1986–87	Veleçiku; Dajti; Bistrica			
1987–88	Turbina	Domozdova		
1988–89	21 Shkurti	Sopoti		
~~1989–91~~	Seasons were not played			
1991–92	Rubiku	ShBO Tiranë		
~~1992–95~~	Seasons were not played			
1995–96	Porto Shëngjin	Olimpiku Plug		
~~1996–97~~	Seasons were not played			
1997–98	Everest	Divjaka		
1998–99	Ilir Viking	Çlirimi		
1999–00	Këlcyra			
2000–01	Veleçiku	Domozdova		
2001–02	Albania Fushë Kuqe	Bubullima		
2002–03	Partizani Academy	Çakrani		
2003–04	Kastrioti	Pogradeci		
2004–05	Turbina	Minatori		
2005–06	Burreli	Bilisht Sport		
2006–07	Bylis	Dajti		
2007–08	Gramozi	Tërbuni		
2008–09	Memaliaj	Gramshi		
2009–10	Vlora	Adriatiku		
2010–11	Kukësi	Himara		
2011–12	Tërbuni	Partizani		
2012–13	Albpetrol	Veleçiku		
2013–14	Iliria	Sopoti		
2014–15	Gramshi	Korabi		
2015–16	Tomori	Shënkolli		
2016–17	Egnatia	Naftëtari		
2017–18	Vora	Elbasani		
2018–19	Tërbuni	Devolli		
2019–20	Vora	Tomori		
2020–21	Shkumbini	Maliqi	Ledjon Xhymerti	20
2021–22	Flamurtari	Luzi 2008	Ervis Kongjini	26
2022–23	Vora	Elbasani	Anton Lleshi	23
2023–24	Pogradeci	Valbona	Gerhard Progni	15
2024–25	Iliria	Luftëtari	Adhurim Hasani	19
2025–26	Besëlidhja	Oriku	Jasmin Raboshta	16

== See also ==
- List of football clubs in Albania
