= Spartak Ajazi =

Albanian footballer

Personal information
- Date of birth: 3 July 1994 (age 32)
- Place of birth: Laç, Albania
- Height: 1.86 m (6 ft 1 in)
- Position: Forward

Team information
- Current team: Erzeni

Youth career
- 2011–2013: Shkëndija Tiranë

Senior career*
Years	Team	Apps	(Gls)
2013–2014	Laçi	0	(0)
2014	→ Burreli (loan)	14	(6)
2014–2015	Iliria	26	(4)
2015–2017	Burreli	36	(15)
2017–2018	Besëlidhja	18	(11)
2018–2019	Burreli	23	(10)
2019–2023	Kastrioti	82	(16)
2023–2024	AF Elbasani	5	(0)
2024–2025	Kastrioti	24	(8)
2026–	Erzeni	1	(1)

International career
2012	Albania U19	1	(0)
- * Club domestic league appearances and goals as of 12 September 2026

Spartak Ajazi (born 3 July 1994) is an Albanian professional footballer who plays as a forward for Albanian club Erzeni.

== Club career ==
In August 2024, Ajazi returned to Kastrioti of the Kategoria e Parë.

On 26 August 2026 it was announced that Ajazi had joined Erzeni ahead of the 2026–27 Kategoria e Dytë, and debuted with goal in the opening match of the season on 12 September 2026 in a 2–1 victory over Shiroka.

== Honours ==
AF Elbasani

- Kategoria e Parë: 2023–24
