= Admir Ujkaj =

Albanian footballer

Personal information
- Full name: Admir Ujkaj
- Date of birth: 15 October 1993 (age 33)
- Place of birth: Shkodër, Albania
- Position: Midfielder

Team information
- Current team: Veleçiku
- Number: 14

Youth career
- Vllaznia

Senior career*
Years	Team	Apps	(Gls)
2012–2014	Vllaznia	1	(0)
2012–2013	→ Laçi (loan)	1	(0)
2013–2014	→ Veleçiku (loan)	37	(0)
2015–2020	Burreli	119	(1)
2020–	Veleçiku	16	(0)
- * Club domestic league appearances and goals as of 18:57, 2 April 2021 (UTC)

Admir Ujkaj (born 15 October 1993) is a professional Albanian footballer who plays as a midfielder for KF Veleçiku in the Albanian First Division.
