= Shirokë =

Shirokë (definite Albanian, Shiroka) may refer to:

- Shirokë, Albania, previously settlement and now a neighbourhood of the urban agglomeration of Shkodër, Albania
- Shirokë, Prizren, settlement in Suha Reka, Kosovo
