= Anton Harapi =

Albanian priest, philosoper, politician and writer

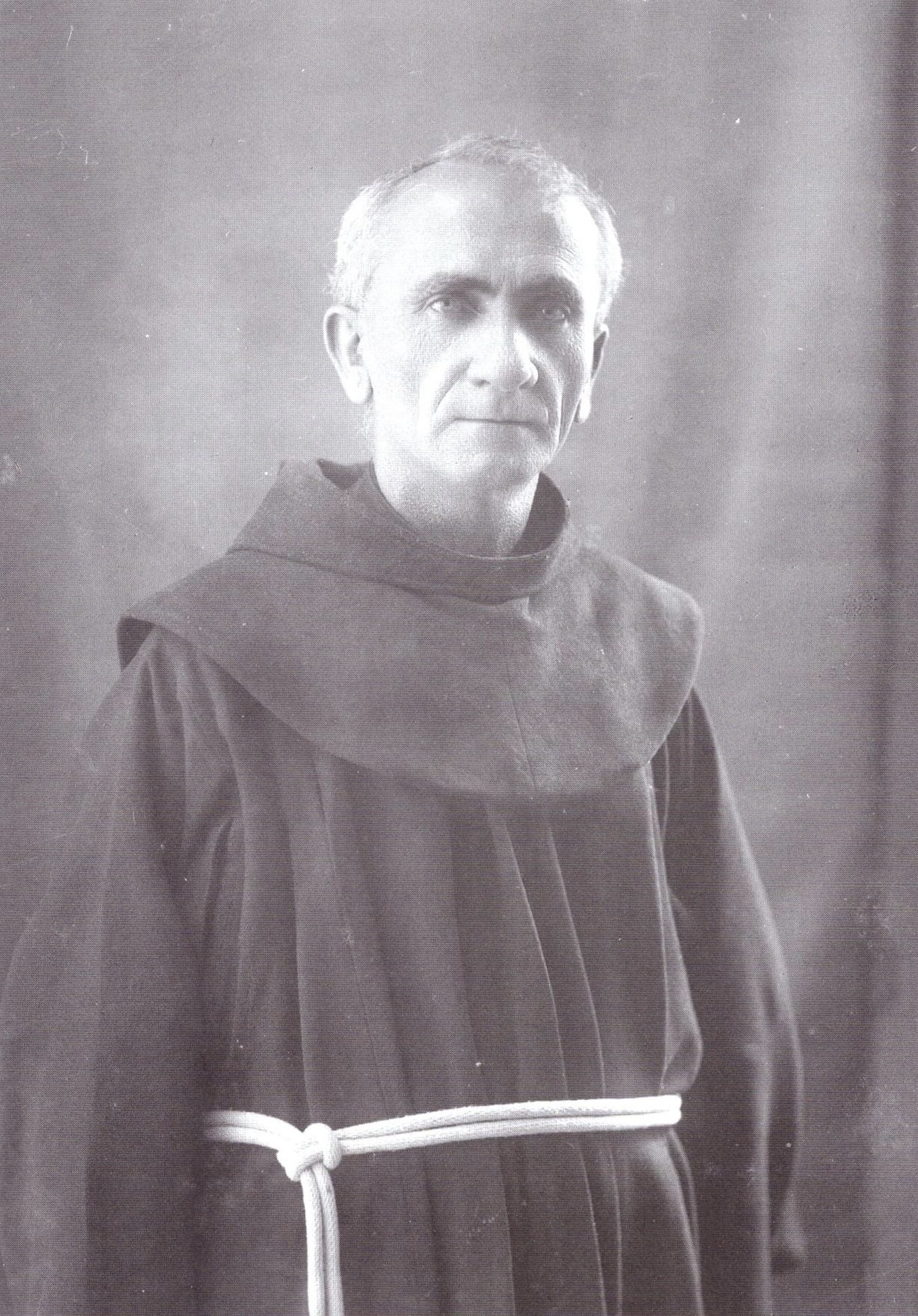
- Portrait of Anton Harapi
- Born: 5 January 1888; Shirokë, Ottoman Empire (today Albania)
- Died: 20 February 1946 (aged 58); Tirana, Albania
- Cause of death: Execution by firing squad
- Education: Catholic theology
- Occupations: Educator; franciscan; writer; politician
- Awards: Honor of the Nation

Anton Harapi (5 January 1888 – 20 February 1946) was an Albanian Franciscan friar, educator, lecturer, publicist, and political figure during World War II. In the first years of the communist regime in Albania, he was executed due to collaboration with the Axis.

== Biography ==
=== Early life ===
Anton Harapi was born on 5 January 1888, in Shiroka and educated in Shkodër.

From 1923 to 1931, he taught at the Franciscan college in Shkodër and was its director. Harapi wrote the book titled “Andrra e pretashit” translated to Pretash’s dream. It is based on a dream by Pretash Cuka Berishaj a highlander from then village of Priften inside the mountain of Gruda, (Harapi worked in the nearby Church Kisha Grudes, one of the oldest Catholic Churches in all of the Balkans).

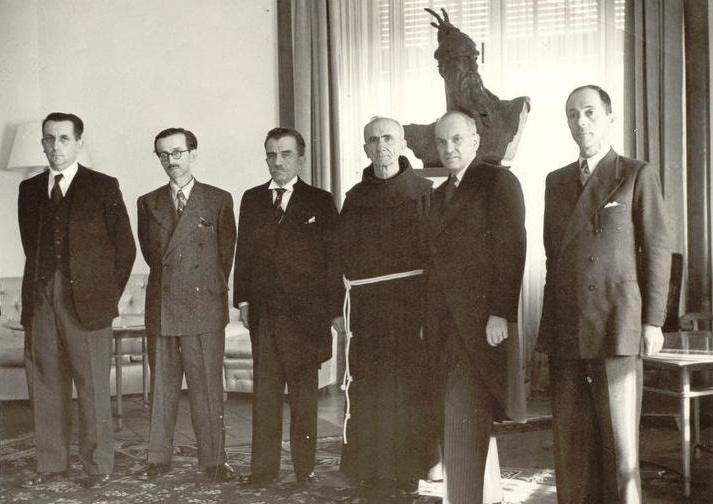
Members of the Albanian cabinet - from left to right: Fuat Dibra, Mihal Zallari, Mehdi Frashëri, Father Anton Harapi, Rexhep Mitrovica and Vehbi Frashëri

=== Death ===
The court was led by General Judge Irakli Bozo and the prosecution was led by Misto Treska. The Military Court sought their execution and confiscation of their property as Axis Collaborators.
