= UET Sport Club =

Albanian football club

- Full name: Klubi Sportiv UET
- Founded: 2018; 8 years ago
- League: Kategoria e Tretë, Group A
- 2024–25: Kategoria e Tretë, Group A, 6th
- Website: uet.edu.al

UET Sport Club is an Albanian professional football club based in Tirana and affiliated with the European University of Tirana (UET).

Established during the 2018–19 academic year, the club was initially formed as a student sports organization to promote participation in football among students enrolled in the university’s sports programs. It has since developed into a professional club competing in the Albanian football league system.

== History ==
UET Sport Club was created as part of the European University of Tirana’s efforts to expand its extracurricular sports activities. Over its first several years, the club participated primarily in university and amateur competitions.

In April 2024, the team won the inaugural FSHF Sunday League, a competition organized by the Albanian Football Federation, under the guidance of Tomi Treska and Marjo Shabanaj. A month later, the club captured the Albanian National University Championship after defeating the Sports University of Tirana in the final.

In November 2024, UET Sport Club was admitted to Kategoria e Tretë, the fourth tier of Albanian football. Its lineup consisted of 24 players, many of whom were UET students. Former Korabi manager Shpend Kumbarçe was appointed head coach with the objective of guiding the club to promotion. Marjo Shabanaj assumed the role of sporting director.

The club made its league debut on 17 November 2024 with a 2–1 home victory over AS Himara at the Kamëz Sports Centre. Aboubacar Soumah scored the club’s first-ever goal in a national league competition from the penalty spot before UET secured victory through an own goal late in the match.

== Honours ==
- FSHF Sunday League
  - Winners (1): 2024
- Albanian National University Championship
  - Winners (1): 2024
