= Jakup Berisha =

Macedonian footballer (born 2000)

Personal information
- Full name: Jakup Berisha
- Date of birth: 20 February 2000 (age 26)
- Place of birth: Skopje, Macedonia
- Height: 1.81 m (5 ft 11 in)
- Position: Right winger

Team information
- Current team: Ferizaj
- Number: 11

Youth career
- –2018: Rabotnicki
- 2018–2019: Vardar

Senior career*
Years	Team	Apps	(Gls)
2018–2019	Vardar	9	(0)
2019–2020	Shkëndija	3	(1)
2020–2021	Shkupi	30	(1)
2021–2022	Pelister	31	(0)
2022–2023	Kukësi	16	(0)
2023–2024	Feronikeli	33	(5)
2024–2025	Suhareka	33	(4)
2025–	Ferizaj	31	(7)

International career
2017	Macedonia U18	3	(0)
2018–2019	Macedonia U19	7	(0)
2019	Macedonia U20	1	(0)
2020–2021	North Macedonia U21	6	(0)
- * Club domestic league appearances and goals as of 22 June 2026

Jakup Berisha (born 20 February 2000) is a Macedonian professional footballer who plays as a Right-Winger for Ferizaj.

== Club career ==
=== Shkëndija ===
On the 30 January 2019, Berisha signed for Shkëndija of the Macedonian First League. He won the league with Shkëndija.

=== Shkupi ===
On the 7 January 2020, he signed for Shkupi of the Macedonian First League.

=== Kukësi ===
On the 16 June 2022, he signed for Kukësi of the Kategoria Superiore.

== Honours ==
Shkëndija

- Macedonian First Football League: 2018–19
