= Mislim Koçi Stadium =

Sports venue in Albania

- Location: Gramsh, Elbasan, Albania
- Owner: KF Gramshi; Gramsh Municipality
- Operator: KF Gramshi
- Capacity: 3,100
- Surface: Grass

Tenant
- KF Gramshi

Mislim Koçi Stadium (Albanian: Stadiumi Mislim Koçi) is a multi-use stadium in Gramsh, Elbasan, Albania which is used as the home ground of local football club KF Gramshi.
