= Jasmin Raboshta =

Albanian footballer

Personal information
- Date of birth: 30 April 1990 (age 36)
- Place of birth: Shkodër, Albania
- Height: 1.82 m (6 ft 0 in)
- Position: Striker

Team information
- Current team: Besëlidhja
- Number: 9

Youth career
- 200?–2007: Vllaznia

Senior career*
Years	Team	Apps	(Gls)
2007–2009	Vllaznia	12	(3)
2009	→ Ada (loan)		
2009–2010	Elbasani	25	(4)
2011	Pogradeci	2	(1)
2011–2013	Luftëtari	45	(15)
2013–2015	Butrinti	51	(34)
2015–2016	Kastrioti	24	(21)
2016	Teuta	1	(0)
2016–2017	Bylis	19	(7)
2017–2018	1960 Silopispor	20	(15)
2018–2019	Siirt İl Özel İdaresi	25	(15)
2019–2020	Vushtrria	11	(4)
2020	Llapi	13	(0)
2020–2021	Burreli	21	(8)
2021–2022	Erzeni	30	(15)
2022–2024	Vora	33	(17)
2024–2025	Liria Prizren	15	(9)
2025–	Besëlidhja	21	(17)
- * Club domestic league appearances and goals as of 11 December 2017

Jasmin Raboshta (born 30 April 1990) is an Albanian professional footballer who plays for Besëlidhja.

== Career ==
Raboshta was born in Shkodër.

=== Luftëtari ===
Following the end of 2011–12, Raboshta extended his contract with Luftëtari for a further season, kepping him at the club until 2013.

=== Butrinti ===
In August 2014, Raboshta joined on a free transfer Butrinti by signing a one-year deal, taking the vacant number 9 for the upcoming 2013–14 season. The team coach Mustafa Hysi stated, "We have wanted him so bad and the president didn't hesitate to fulfil our wish."

=== Kastrioti ===
On 27 June 2015, Raboshta was signed by fellow Kategoria e Parë side Kastrioti for an undisclosed fee in their bid to achieve promotion back to Kategoria Superiore.

=== Teuta ===
On 13 July 2016, after a successful individual season with Kastrioti, Raboshta returned in Kategoria Superiore and joined Teuta on a free transfer, where he penned a one-year contract. Upon signing, Raboshta stated: "I'm part of an important club in Albania and I want to thank the club directors and the coach for believing in me, by making me part of Teuta. For me, it's a pleasure to be part of this team".

== Career statistics ==
As of 13 July 2016

Club	Season	League			Cup (Note: Including cup competitions, such as Albanian Cup)		Continental (Note: Including continental competitions, such as UEFA Champions League and UEFA Europa League)		Other (Note: Including other competitions, such as Albanian Supercup)		Total	
Club	Season	Division	Apps	Goals	Apps	Goals	Apps	Goals	Apps	Goals	Apps	Goals
Vllaznia	2007–08	Kategoria Superiore	4	3	0	0	—		—		4	3
Vllaznia	2008–09	Kategoria Superiore	8	0	3	4	—		—		11	4
Vllaznia	Total		12	3	3	4	—		—		15	7
Elbasani	2009–10	Kategoria e Parë	11	4	0	0	—		—		11	4
Elbasani	2010–11	Kategoria Superiore	13	0	0	0	—		—		13	0
Elbasani	Total		24	4	0	0	—		—		24	4
Luftëtari	2011–12	Kategoria e Parë	27	13	1	0	—		—		28	13
Luftëtari	2012–13	Kategoria Superiore	18	2	2	0	—		—		20	2
Luftëtari	Total		45	15	3	0	—		—		48	15
Butrinti	2013–14	Kategoria e Parë	27	17	1	1	—		—		28	18
Butrinti	2014–15	Kategoria e Parë	24	17	0	0	—		—		27	17
Butrinti	Total		51	34	1	1	—		—		52	35
Kastrioti	2015–16	Kategoria e Parë	24	21	2	1	—		—		26	22
Kastrioti	Total		24	21	2	1	—		—		26	22
Teuta	2016–17	Kategoria Superiore	0	0	0	0	2 (Note: All Appearance(s) in UEFA Europa League)	0	—		2	0
Teuta	Total		0	0	0	0	2	0	—		2	0
Career total			156	77	9	6	2	0	0	0	167	83
