= Eagle FA =

Albanian football club

- Full name: Eagle Football Agency
- Founded: 19 October 2021; 4 years ago
- Ground: Skënder Halili Complex
- Owner: Andi Matraxhiu
- Manager: Nikolin Çoçlli
- League: Kategoria e Dytë
- 2024–25: Kategoria e Tretë, Group A, 1st (promoted)

Eagle FA is an Albanian professional football club based in Tirana. They are currently competing in Kategoria e Dytë, Group B, the third tier of Albanian football. Their home ground is the Skënder Halili Complex.

The club was founded in 2021 and joined Kategoria e Tretë during the 2021–22 season, where they finished 4th out of 8 places. At the conclusion of the 2023–24 season, the team finished 2nd place in Group A, their highest finish to date.

== Honours ==
- (Albania) Kategoria e Tretë:
  - Champions (1): 2024–25
