= Skënder Halili Complex =

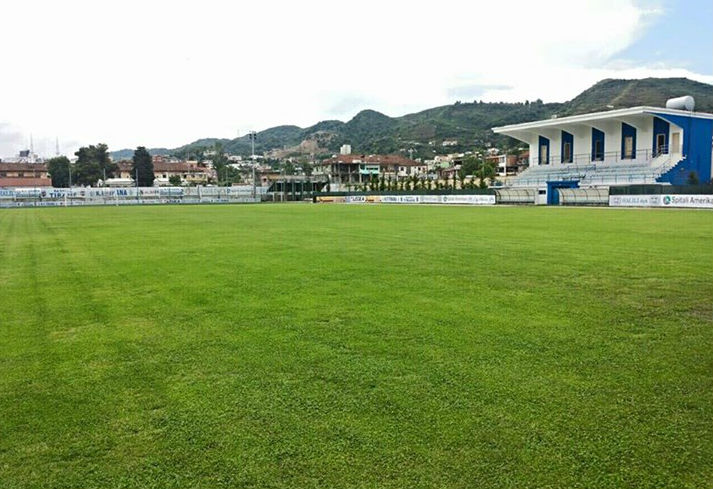
- Location: Tirana, Albania
- Owner: KF Tirana
- Type: Sports training facility
- Surface: Grass pitches (1), Synthetic turf (1)

Tenants
- KF Tirana, KF Tirana B

The Skënder Halili Complex is the sports training facility and academy headquarters of Albanian football club KF Tirana. It is located off of Rruga e Kavajës, near the Birra Tirana factory. The training complex was posthumously named after Skënder Halili, who was one of the club's most notable associates, both during his playing career and after. The complex features a full sized natural grass football pitch, as well as a smaller astro turf fan along with dressing rooms used by senior team as well as some of the youth teams. In December 2014, work began on both the Skënder Halili Complex and the Selman Stërmasi Stadium in order to fully renovate these grounds to be used by the club, and at the training ground the training facilities were all improved which included the dressing rooms and even the single stand that holds a small number of spectators for those wishing to attend training sessions and even occasional friendlies that are played at the ground.
