= Kompleksi Vëllezërit Duli =

- Interactive map of Kompleksi Vëllezërit Duli
- Location: Koplik, Albania
- Coordinates: 42°13′6.8″N 19°25′54.6″E
- Owner: KS Veleçiku Koplik
- Capacity: 2,000
- Surface: Grass

Tenant
- KS Veleçiku Koplik

Kompleksi Vëllezërit Duli is a multi-use stadium in Koplik, Albania. The stadium has a capacity of 2,000 people and it is mostly used for football matches and it is the home ground of KS Veleçiku Koplik.
