= KF Shiroka =

Albanian football club

- Full name: Klubi i Futbollit Shiroka
- Founded: 12 July 2024; 2 years ago
- Ground: Reshit Rusi Stadium
- Administrator: Ergin Axhani
- Manager: Matías Tatangelo
- League: Kategoria e Dytë, Group A

KF Shiroka is an Albanian professional football club based in Shirokë, a locality on the southern shore of Lake Shkodër. Founded on 12 July 2024 by former player Fatmir Axhani, the club competes in the Third Division of Albanian football and plays its home matches at the 1,200 seat Reshit Rusi Stadium.

== History ==
The club entered the 2024–25 Kategoria e Tretë, Albania's fourth tier, in its inaugural season. Fatmir Axhani and Valmir Kurti were appointed to lead the technical staff, with the primary objective of securing promotion to Kategoria e Dytë. Shiroka played its first competitive match against Partizani B.

At the end of the 2024–25 season, the club finished third in Group A and earned promotion to Kategoria e Dytë through the play-off bracket.

Shiroka is one of three sides representing the Shkodër municipal region, alongside Vllaznia and KF Shkodra.

=== List of managers ===
Name	Period
(Argentina) Matías Tatangelo	5 Jan 2025 – 28 Mar 2025
(Argentina) Matías Tatangelo	4 Aug 2025 – 31 Dec 2025
(Portugal) André Jasmins	12 Jan 2026 – 28 Jan 2026
(Italy) Emiliano Bonazzoli	29 Jan 2026 – 4 Mar 2026
(Spain) Pablo Ríos	5 Mar 2026 – 1 Jun 2026
(Argentina) Matías Tatangelo	28 Oct 2026 –
