= KF Maliqi =

Albanian football club

Maliqi
- Full name: Klubi i Futbollit Maliqi
- Founded: 1950; 76 years ago
- Ground: Jovan Asko Stadium
- Capacity: 1,500
- Owner: Bashkia Maliq
- President: Gëzim Topçiu
- Manager: Edmir Osmanllari
- League: Kategoria e Dytë, Group B
- 2025–26: Kategoria e Dytë, Group B, 5th
Home colours	Away colours

Klubi i Futbollit Maliqi is an Albanian football club based in the town of Maliq. The club was founded in 1950 and has played its home games at the Jovan Asko Stadium. The play in the Kategoria e Dytë, which is the third tier of football in the country.

== Current squad ==
Note: Flags indicate national team as defined under FIFA eligibility rules; some limited exceptions apply. Players may hold more than one non-FIFA nationality.

No.	Pos.	Nation	Player
1	GK	ALB	Miljano Mara
—	MF	ALB	Mario Bregu
—	MF	ALB	Franko Kapllani
—	MF	ALB	Ronaldo Isufi
—	MF	ALB	Lion Ndoci
—	FW	ALB	Flavio Demollari
—	FW	ALB	Jorgo Qeleshi
—		ALB	Xhoni Seida
—		ALB	Brevaldi Xhafka
—	MF	ALB	Rudens Muçollari
—	DF	ALB	Admir Bali
—	FW	ALB	Paolo Ivani
—	DF	ALB	Renato Këndezi
—	DF	ALB	Alsejni Dervishaj

No.	Pos.	Nation	Player
—	FW	ALB	Mario Kame
—	GK	ALB	Daniel Lamellari
—	MF	ALB	Romario Çelniku
—	MF	ALB	Andrea Jaupllari
—	MF	ALB	Shkëlzen Tako
—	DF	ALB	Xhulian Trëndafili
—	DF	ALB	Klejdi Rapo
—	DF	ALB	Ledion Rezhda
—	FW	ALB	Arlind Xaka
—	FW	ALB	Dario Kame
—		ALB	Enrik Agolli
—	FW	ALB	Redinel Demollari
