= Basania FC =

Albanian football club

Basania
- Full name: Basania Bushat Football Club
- Short name: Basania FC
- Founded: 12 June 2020; 6 years ago
- Ground: Stadiumi Basania
- Capacity: 500
- President: Ermir Shimaj
- Manager: Arbër Shytani
- League: Kategoria e Dytë, Group A
- 2025–26: Kategoria e Dytë, Group A, 10th

Basania FC is an Albanian professional football club based in Bushat. They are currently competing in Kategoria e Dytë, Group A.

== History ==
Basania FC was established in 2020 as a youth football club by Ermir Shimaj, a local businessman and former footballer, to represent the village of Bushat, in Vau i Dejës municipality. The club's name pays homage to the Illyrian city of Bassania, historically located near Bushat. For the 2022–23 season, a senior team was introduced which competed in Kategoria e Tretë. The following season, they secured first place in Group A, earning a promotion to Kategoria e Dytë.

== Honours ==
- (Albania) Kategoria e Tretë:
  - Champions (1): 2023–24

== Players ==
=== Current squad ===
Note: Flags indicate national team as defined under FIFA eligibility rules; some limited exceptions apply. Players may hold more than one non-FIFA nationality.

| No. | Pos. | Nation | Player |
|---|---|---|---|
| — | GK | ALB | Besmir Mucejani |
| — | GK | MLI | Cheick Oumar Keita |
| — | DF | ALB | Egzon Shimaj |
| — | DF | MLI | Salimou Kane |
| — | DF | ALB | Olsi Shema |
| — | DF | ALB | Erjon Mani |
| — | DF | ALB | Taulant Nikshiqi |

| No. | Pos. | Nation | Player |
|---|---|---|---|
| — | MF | MLI | Ibrahim Sidibe |
| — | MF | ALB | Refajit Canja |
| — | MF | ALB | Ergys Puka |
| — | FW | ALB | Albert Mila |
| — | FW | ALB | Flori Leka |
| — | FW | ALB | Besard Limani |
| — | FW | ALB | Reisid Hasanaj |
| — | FW | ALB | Alsed Abdija |

=== List of managers ===
| Name | Period |
|---|---|
| (Albania) Fatjon Hasanaj | 19 August 2023—16 July 2024 |
| (Albania) Haris Lika | 16 July 2024— 16 August 2025 |
| (Bosnia and Herzegovina) Derviš Hadžiosmanović | 19 August 2025— |

== Honours ==
=== League titles ===
- Kategoria e Tretë

Champions (1): 2023–24
