= Luzi 2008 =

Albanian football club

- Full name: Klubi i Futbollit Luz i Vogël 2008
- Founded: 29 September 2008; 18 years ago
- Ground: Luz i Vogël Stadium
- Capacity: 600
- President: Lavdërim Lusha
- Manager: Ramadan Ndreu
- League: Kategoria e Dytë, Group A
- 2025–26: Kategoria e Dytë, Group A, 6th
Home colours	Away colours

Luzi 2008 is an Albanian professional football club based in Luz i Vogël, Kavajë. The club was founded in 2008 and is currently competing in Kategoria e Dytë which is the third tier of Albanian football.

== History ==
Luzi 2008 played its first ever competitive game against KF Erzeni in the Second Division Group A on 21 September 2008. The match itself was not a great moment in the club's history as they lost 2–0 away from home. The next two games in the season were also away from home which meant that Luzi would not earn a single point in the first four games of the season. The team had to wait until their first home game for their first ever point and goal. This came on 2 November 2008 against KF Adriatiku Mamurrasi. The match ended 1–0 in favor of Luzi which was enough to seal the win.

It was announced on 8 October 2009 that legendary national team player Altin Rraklli would be joining the club as technical director.

By far the biggest game in the club's history was the Albanian Cup first round encounter with the champions of Albania KF Tirana on 21 October 2009. The match was played at a sold out and very festive Luz i Vogël Stadium. Tirana took the lead in the 14th minute through national team midfielder Jetmir Sefa, but Luzi quickly fought back to equalise just 2 minutes later with Bejko. Luzi then went on to dominate and grab another two goals with Fagu in the 42nd and then Gega in the 62nd minute.

== Stadium ==
The club currently plays at the purpose-built Stadiumi Luz i Vogël 2008 in Luz i Vogël. The stadium was built in 2008 by the Luz i Vogël council and was paid for by them. The stadium currently holds 600 supporters and is an all seater. The playing surface is all natural grass. However, the stadium does not have a disabled area or even a professional camera system in place. KS Besa Kavajë have also used the stadium for friendly and cup games, the first was an Albanian Cup encounter against KS Kastrioti Krujë on 17 December 2008.

=== Investment ===
In November 2008, the president of the club Lavdim Lusha and two of his brothers from the small town of Luz i Vogël made clear their ambitions of investing up to 400,000 euros into the club's stadium. The three brothers Lavdim, Sokoli and Albert Lusha made the news public at an AFA event in the town which was attended by both the presidents of Teuta Durrës and Besa Kavajë.

=== Renovation ===
Renovation on the stadium began in 2013 following the end of the 2012–13 season, and was completed in March 2014, in time for the club's home game against FK Vora. The club played their home games in Rrogozhinë at the stadium of KS Egnatia while the renovation took place, which included the reconstruction of the pitch. In the inauguration led by the club's joint presidents and brothers Lavdrim and Albert Lusha, the president of the Albanian Football Association Armand Duka was invited.

== Statistics ==
=== Matches ===
- First competitive match: KF Erzeni 2–0 KF Luz i Vogël 2008, Kategoria e dytë, 21 September 2008
- First Albanian Cup match: KF Luz i Vogël 2008 2–1 KF Çlirimi, Second Preliminary Round, 30 September 2009
- First match at Stadiumi Luz i Vogël 2008: KF Luz i Vogël 2008 1–0 KF Adriatiku Mamurrasi, 2 November 2008

=== Record wins ===
- Record win: 7–1 v KS Korabi Peshkopi, Kategoria e dytë, 11 April 2009
- Record Albanian Cup win: 3–1 v KF Tirana, 21 October 2009
- Record away win: 2–0 v KF Naftëtari Kuçovë, Kategoria e dytë, 20 September 2009

== Current squad ==
As of 2 February 2024

Note: Flags indicate national team as defined under FIFA eligibility rules; some limited exceptions apply. Players may hold more than one non-FIFA nationality.

No.	Pos.	Nation	Player
3	DF	MKD	Arben Bajrami
4	DF	ALB	Serxhio Xhika
5	DF	ALB	Erb Koni
6	MF	ALB	Redon Laho
8	MF	ALB	Nilsen Gjinaj
9	FW	NGR	Peter Itodo
10	MF	ALB	Patrik Treni
18	FW	ALB	Foti Çuçka
19	MF	ALB	Marjo Jushi
20	MF	ALB	Aldo Qoshku
21	DF	ALB	Iriglen Zaimaj
24	MF	NGR	Michael Akpan

No.	Pos.	Nation	Player
25	DF	ALB	Ergi Goga
31	GK	ALB	Drilon Mati
35	DF	ALB	Erblin Koka
88	DF	ALB	Sildi Hidri
92	DF	ALB	Elsamed Burgaj
—	GK	ALB	Mateo Janpllari
—	DF	ALB	Jurgen Rucaj
—	DF	ALB	Kristi Karaj
—	MF	ALB	Edi Devole
—	MF	ALB	Xheron Osma
—	FW	ALB	Herdi Balla
—	FW	ALB	Redi Veriu

== List of managers ==
- (Albania) Stavri Nica (10 Oct 2014 – 25 Oct 2014)
- (Albania) Anxhelo Suta (1 May 2019 – 31 Jul 2020)
- (Albania) Oltijon Kernaja (1 Aug 2020 – 30 Jun 2021)
- (Albania) Edmond Dalipi (1 Jul 2021 – 30 Jun 2022)
- (Albania) Lorenc Pashja (1 Jul 2022 – 12 Feb 2023)
- (Albania) Bekim Kuli (14 Feb 2023 – 20 Feb 2023)
- (Albania) Bledi Kadiu (21 Feb 2023 – 30 Jun 2023)
- (Albania) Gerson Stojku (1 Jul 2023 – 14 Jul 2023)
- (Albania) Bledar Devolli (15 Jul 2023 – 18 Sep 2023)
- (Albania) Xhevahir Kapllani (19 Sep 2023 – 2 Nov 2023)
- (Albania) Gëzim Bushi (3 Nov 2023 – 30 Jun 2024)
- (Albania) Lorenc Pashja (1 Jul 2024 – 11 Mar 2025)
- (Albania) Bledi Kadiu (11 Mar 2025 – 15 Dec 2025)
- (Albania) Eduart Terthori (30 Jan 2026 – 1 Jun 2026)
- (Albania) Alert Alcani (28 Jul 2026 – 11 Nov 2026)
- (Albania) Ramadan Ndreu (12 Nov 2026 –)

== See also ==
- Besa Kavajë
- KF Golemi
- KF Egnatia
