= KS Delvina =

Albanian football club

Delvina
- Full name: Klubi Sportiv Delvina
- Nickname: Trojanët
- Founded: 1928; 98 years ago as Nimet Abazi Delvinë Nimet Abazi Delvinë (1918–1949) Bistrica (1949) Delvina (1949–50) Spartaku Delvinë (1951–54) Puna Delvinë (1954–57) Hidroçentrali Bistricë (1958–60) Bistrica (1960–93) Delvina (1993–present)
- Ground: Delvina Stadium; Delvinë
- Capacity: 2,500
- Owner: Bashkia Delvinë
- Manager: Mentor Hasani
- League: Kategoria e Dytë, Group B
- 2025–26: Kategoria e Dytë, Group B, 9th
Home colours	Away colours

KS Delvina is an Albanian football club based in Delvinë. The club competes in Kategoria e Dytë, the third tier of Albanian football. Its home ground is the Panajot Pano Stadium, which has a capacity of approximately 2,500 spectators.

== History ==
The club was founded in 1928 and has competed under several names throughout its history. During the communist period it was successively known as Spartaku Delvinë, Puna Delvinë and Hidroçentrali Bistricë, before adopting the name Bistrica in 1960. The club retained this name until 1993, when it reverted to the town's official name, Delvina.

Delvina won the Albanian Second Division championship during the 1986–87 season. In the 2011–12 campaign the club finished eighth and in 2015–16 it placed third, earning qualification for the 2016–17 Albanian Cup. The team, however, did not participate in the competition because of a suspension.

Following relegation to the Albanian Amateur Championship in 2021, Delvina returned to Kategoria e Dytë in 2022. The club is owned by the Municipality of Delvinë and has in recent years relied primarily on municipal funds.

== Rivalry ==
KS Delvina’s main rival is KF Butrinti. Matches between the two clubs are sometimes referred to as the "South Derby" (Albanian: Derbi i Jugut).

== Honours ==
- Albanian Second Division
  - Winners (1): 1986–87
