= KF Këlcyra =

Albanian football club

Këlcyra
- Full name: Klubi i Futbollit Këlcyra
- Founded: 16 September 1981; 44 years ago
- Ground: Fusha Sportive Këlcyrë
- Capacity: 1,000
- League: Kategoria e Dytë, Group B
- 2025–26: Kategoria e Dytë, Group B, 10th

Klubi i Futbollit Këlcyra is an Albanian football club based in the small town of Këlcyrë. KF Këlcyra is currently competing in the Kategoria e Dytë.

== History ==
The club was founded on 16 September 1981 by Andrea Simoni, who wanted to grow football in his town. The club was founded as FK Trebeshina Këlcyrë. They mostly played in the Albanian Second Division until the 1999/2000 season, when they won the Albanian Second Division. They played for 3 seasons until the 2002/2003 season, where they finished in the Kategoria e Tretë relegation zone. 2 seasons later, they won the Albanian Third Division.

== Honours ==
- Albanian Second Division Title – 1999/2000
- Albanian Third Division Title – 2004/2005

== Current squad ==
Note: Flags indicate national team as defined under FIFA eligibility rules; some limited exceptions apply. Players may hold more than one non-FIFA nationality.

No.	Pos.	Nation	Player
—	GK	ALB	Denis Lezo
—	GK	ALB	Florian Hadaj
—	DF	ALB	Eraldo Meshini
—	DF	ALB	Ilir Dervishi
—	DF	ALB	Marsel Bejko
—	DF	ALB	Robert Spahiu
—	DF	ALB	Sajmir Kule
—	DF	ALB	Tonin Qyra
—	MF	ALB	Adriatik Faslliu
—	MF	ALB	Besmir Kanani
—	MF	ALB	Ernest Elezi

No.	Pos.	Nation	Player
—	MF	ALB	Klaudio Dorti
—	MF	ALB	Teoklid Premto
—	FW	ALB	Andri Jurgji
—	FW	ALB	Entilon Kamberi
—	FW	ALB	Taulant Manaj
—		ALB	Anis Tena
—		ALB	Arbën Kano
—		ALB	Arbën Plugu
—		ALB	Feti Sadiku
—		ALB	Klitjon Lame
—		ALB	Vangjel Bendo
