= KF Oriku =

Albanian football club

Oriku
- Full name: Klubi i Futbollit Oriku
- Founded: 1955; 71 years ago
- Ground: Orikum Stadium
- Capacity: 2,000
- President: Muharrem Jazoj
- Manager: Gerd Haxhiu
- League: Kategoria e Parë
- 2025–26: Kategoria e Dytë, Group B, 1st (promoted)
Home colours	Away colours

Klubi i Futbollit Oriku is an Albanian football club based in the town of Orikum. They last competed in Kategoria e Dytë during the 2023–24 season, finishing fourth in Group B.

== History ==
Football club "Oriku" was founded in the summer of 1955, when some local navy soldiers along with Soviet specialists from the Pashaliman military base, decided to create a football team which took part in a tournament held that year between the country's military units.

Named after the ancient Illyrian city of Oricum, the club encompasses a fanbase that covers the Orikum–Dukat–Tragjas–Radhimë region.

In May 2013, former mayor Gëzim Çapaj (today the club's administrator), together with head coach Albert Haxhiaj and a group of young talented players, in the qualifying matches of Kategoria e Tretë earned the right to take part in Kategoria e Dytë (South Group), for the 2013–14 season.

After five full seasons, Orikum climbed the ladder, joining Kategoria e Parë for the 2018–19 season where they finished fifth in Group B.

== Current squad ==
As of 1 January 2026

Note: Flags indicate national team as defined under FIFA eligibility rules; some limited exceptions apply. Players may hold more than one non-FIFA nationality.

No.	Pos.	Nation	Player
1	GK	BRA	Anderson Rocha
2	DF	ALB	Lejdi Gjoka
3	DF	ALB	Daniel Bregova
4	DF	ALB	Ronald Disha
6	MF	ALB	Ervis Kasaj
7	FW	ALB	Aleksandër Dalanaj
8	MF	BRA	Lucas Oliveira
9	FW	ALB	Roland Shkreli
10	MF	ALB	Ermanel Llojaj
11	FW	ALB	Albi Metani
14	FW	ALB	Fabiano Veraj
15	DF	ALB	Klark Kalus

No.	Pos.	Nation	Player
17	FW	ALB	Enkelajdo Kamberaj
19	FW	ALB	Xhuliano Mirani
20	MF	ALB	Klaus Alinani
24	DF	ALB	Julian Gjinaj (captain)
25	MF	ALB	Erald Kapo
26	FW	CMR	Calice Nwatsock
30	MF	ALB	Alvi Mezani
44	DF	ALB	Selindjon Zholi
52	GK	RUS	Akhmed Bunkhoev
77	DF	ALB	Xhuljano Buxhelaj
—	MF	ALB	Bruno Telushi
—	FW	ALB	Klejdon Arbëri

== Personnel and staff ==
Current technical staff
Position	Name
Head coach	(Albania) Sherif Idrizaj
Assistant coach	(Albania)
Goalkeeping coach	(Albania)
Doctor	(Albania) Dr.Enrik Haxhiraj
Board members
Office	Name
President	(Albania) Muharrem Jazoj
Vice-president	(Albania) Vullnet Sinaj
Sports director	(Albania) Arsen Belaj
Technical director	(Albania) Albert Haxhiaj

== List of managers ==
- (Albania) Albert Haxhiraj (18 Sep 2013– 30 Jun 2017)
- (Albania) Artan Sakaj (1 Aug 2017– 20 Oct 2019)
- (Albania) Eqerem Memushaj (23 Oct 2019– 17 Dec 2020)
- (Albania) Besmir Shabani (17 Dec 2020 – 31 Dec 2020)
- (Albania) Artan Sakaj (1 Jan 2021– 30 Jun 2021)
- (Albania) Besmir Shabani (1 Aug 2021– 30 Jun 2022)
- (Albania) Arlindo Rustemi (1 Jul 2022– 30 Jun 2023)
- (Albania) Sherif Idrizaj (1 Jul 2023– 21 Sep 2023)
- (Albania) Gerd Haxhiu (23 Sep 2026–)
