= KS Devolli =

Albanian football club

Devolli
- Full name: Klubi Sportiv Devolli
- Founded: 5 June 1927; 99 years ago
- Ground: Bilisht Stadium
- Capacity: 3,000
- Owner: Bashkia Devoll
- President: Eduard Duro; Spartak Meraku
- Manager: Dorian Çuko
- League: Kategoria e Dytë, Group B
- 2025–26: Kategoria e Dytë, Group B, 8th
Home colours	Away colours

Klubi Sportiv Devolli is an Albanian football club based in the town of Bilisht.

== History ==
=== Bilisht Sport ===
Klubi Sportiv Devolli was founded in 1927 and played under the name Devolli Bilisht. They were renamed to just Bilishti between 1949 and 1950, before changing to Puna Bilisht between 1951 and 1958. The club then reverted its name back to Devolli Bilisht in 1958 which it kept until 2006 when they change their name to Klubi Futbollitik Bilisht Sport. In the 2010s, another club from Bilisht emerged and called KF Devolli.

They were champions of the Albanian Second Division for the 2018-2019 campaign, which promoted them to the Albanian First Division upcoming season. Currently they play in the Albanian Second Division, after suffering relegation from the Albanian First Division in the 2019-20 season.

== Current squad ==
As of 8 December 2019

Note: Flags indicate national team as defined under FIFA eligibility rules; some limited exceptions apply. Players may hold more than one non-FIFA nationality.

No.	Pos.	Nation	Player
1	GK	ALB	Klosaid Avrami
2	DF	ALB	Dorian Çuko
3	MF	ALB	Sadik Çela
4	FW	ALB	Paulo Ivani
5	DF	ALB	Feliks Cane
6	DF	ALB	Mateo Pere
7	MF	ALB	Klejdi Rapo
8	MF	ALB	Mikea Avdillari
12	GK	ALB	Hektor Mali

No.	Pos.	Nation	Player
13	FW	ALB	Ervis Fifo
14	MF	ALB	Fabjan Nallbati
15	DF	ALB	Anesti Tako
16	FW	ALB	Dario Kame
19	MF	ALB	Ronaldo Isufi
20	MF	ALB	Kleanthi Kambo
22	FW	ALB	Mario Kame
23	FW	ALB	Flavio Demollari
99	GK	ALB	Xhuljo Mullaj

== List of managers ==
- (Albania) Stavri Nica (Jan 2019 - Nov 2019)
- (Albania) Festim Fetollari (Nov 2019 - Aug 2020)
- (Albania) Erindi Maneshi (Aug 2021 - Jun 2022)
- (Albania) Egli Malesija (1 Jul 2022 - 30 Jun 2024)
- (Albania) Trifon Meraku (1 Jul 2024 - 30 Jun 2025)
- (Albania) Erindi Maneshi (1 Jul 2025 - 3 Aug 2026)
- (Albania) Vladimir Gjoni (4 Aug 2026 - 7 Oct 2026)
- (Albania) Adriatik Faslliu (8 Aug 2026 - 9 Nov 2026)
