= FK Veleçiku =

Albanian football club

Veleçiku
- Full name: Futboll Klub Veleçiku Koplik
- Nickname: Djemtë e Malësisë
- Founded: 1948; 78 years ago
- Ground: Kompleksi Vellezërit Duli
- Capacity: 2,000
- President: Shpëtim Halaj
- Manager: Admir Hysaj
- League: Kategoria e Dytë, Group A
- 2025–26: Kategoria e Dytë, Group A, 7th
Home colours	Away colours

Futboll Klub Veleçiku is an Albanian football club based in Koplik, Malësi e Madhe Municipality. Founded in 1948, it is one of the oldest football clubs in northern Albania.

Nicknamed Djemtë e Malësisë, FK Veleçiku plays its home matches at the 2,000-seat sports complex Vëllezërit Duli.

== History ==
During communist rule, the club competed under several names, including Sport Klub Kopliku and Puna Koplik, before adopting the name Veleçiku, derived from the nearby Veleçik mountain, also featured in its logo.

For most of its existence, Veleçiku competed in the Albanian Second Division, establishing itself as one of the stronger clubs outside the country’s major football centers. The club won its first Second Division title in the 1994–95 season, earning promotion to the Albanian First Division.

Alternating between the second and third divisions for a number of years, Veleçiku enjoyed another successful campaign in 2017–18 where they secured promotion to the Albanian First Division after defeating Shkumbini in the play-off match, claiming its second Second Division championship in the process.

== Honours ==
- Albanian Second Division
  - Winners (2): 1994–95, 2017–18
  - Runners-up: 2012–13
