= KF Butrinti =

Albanian football club

Butrinti
- Full name: Klubi i Futbollit Butrinti
- Nicknames: Detarët; Piratët e Jonit
- Founded: 25 January 1936; 90 years ago as Butrinto Butrinto (1936–45) Butrinti (1945–49) Saranda (1949–50) Puna Sarandë (1951–57) Butrinti (1958–present)
- Ground: Andon Lapa Stadium
- Capacity: 5,500
- Manager: Artan Meçani
- League: Kategoria e Dytë, Group B
- 2025–26: Kategoria e Dytë, Group B, 2nd
Home colours	Away colours

KF Butrinti is an Albanian football club based in Sarandë. The club's home ground is the Andon Lapa Stadium and they currently compete in Kategoria e Dytë, the third tier of Albanian football.

The club falls under the KS Butrinti sports club which also features one of the most successful swimming teams in the country. Their best season to date was in 2014–15 when they finished third in Kategoria e Parë.

== History ==
The earliest known records of the club date to 1932, when it competed under the name Butrinto. During this period, the team played friendly matches within the Gjirokastër prefecture against clubs such as Leka i Madh of Përmet, Drita of Gjirokastër, Vetëtima of Himarë and Namik Delvina of Delvinë. Sporting activities in Sarandë during this time were organized by a local sports and cultural association.

On 25 January 1936, the club elected a new leadership, with Kristofor Harito serving as chairman and Solomon Jontovi, a member of the local Jewish community, appointed as the official responsible for football related affairs.

Following the end of World War II, the club diassociated from organized competition. It would return at the end of 1948 under the name Saranda, taking part in the Albanian Republic Cup. The team was drawn in a group with clubs from Delvinë, Derviçan and Libohovë.

After 1950, several sports associations were established in Sarandë, including "Puna", "Dinamo", "Spartaku" and "Studenti". In 1963, the club changed its name to Butrinti. From then onwards, the team’s jersey featured the emblem of the "Goddess of Butrint", in reference to the ancient archaeological site of Butrint.

== Honours ==
- Kategoria e Dytë
  - Winners (3): 1961, 1963–64, 1979–80
- Sporti Popullor Cup
  - Winners (1): 1980
