= KF Gramshi =

Albanian football club

Gramshi
- Full name: Klubi i Futbollit Gramshi
- Nickname: Demat e Kuq
- Founded: 1965; 61 years ago
- Ground: Myslym Koçi Stadium
- Capacity: 1,500
- Manager: Alfred Allamani
- League: Kategoria e Dytë, Group A
- 2025–26: Kategoria e Dytë, Group A, 9th
Home colours	Away colours

Klubi i Futbollit Gramshi is an Albanian football club based in Gramsh. Their home ground is the Myslym Koçi Stadium.

== History ==
The club was called 10 Korriku until 1992, when it was changed to Gramshi. Following a 5–1 win over Gramozi on 10 May 2015, the club was promoted back to the Kategoria e Parë but they later rejected the promotion. The club won the 2014-15 Albanian Second Division.
