= KF Albpetrol =

Albanian football club

Albpetrol
- Full name: Klubi i Futbollit Albpetrol
- Founded: 1947; 79 years ago Patosi (1947–51) Puna Patos (1951–58) Punëtori (1958–92) Albpetrol (1992–present)
- Ground: Alush Noga Stadium
- Capacity: 4,000
- President: Endrit Çako; Fation Duro
- Manager: Polizoi Arbëri
- League: Kategoria e Dytë, Group B
- 2025–26: Kategoria e Tretë, Group B, 1st (promoted)
Home colours	Away colours

Klubi i Futbollit Albpetrol is an Albanian football club located in the city of Patos in Fier County. Their home ground is the Alush Noga Stadium and they currently compete in the Kategoria e Dytë.

== History ==
=== Punëtori Patos ===
The club was founded in 1947 under the name Patosi, which was renamed to Puna Patos between 1951 and 1958, which was again renamed to Punëtori Patos in 1958. They first played in the National Championship in 1974. In 1990, they were finalists in the Albanian National Cup, where they lost to FK Partizani.

=== Albpetrol Patos ===
In 1992, the club was taken over by petroleum company Albpetrol, who changed the name of the club to Albpetrol Patos. The first participation of the club in European football was in the 1993–94 UEFA Cup Winners' Cup where they lost 1–3 on aggregate in the qualifying round against FC Balzers of Liechtenstein.

== Honours ==
- Kategoria e Parë
  - Winners (1): 1973–74
- Kategoria e Dytë
  - Winners (3):1962–63, 1964–65, 2012–13

== European games ==
- QR = Qualifying Round

Season	Competition	Round	Country	Club	Home	Away
1993–94	UEFA Cup Winners' Cup	QR	(Liechtenstein)	FC Balzers	0–0	1–3

== List of managers ==
- (Albania) Fatmir Dogani (Aug 1992 – Jun 1995)
- (Albania) Vangjel Capo (Jul 1995 – Jun 1996)
- (Albania) Fatmir Dogani (Jul 1996 – Jun 1998)
- (Albania) Andrea Marko (2006)
- (Albania) Arben Ymeraj (2010 – 2012)
- (Albania) Marjol Miho (2019 –
- (Albania) Elidon Demiraj (Aug 2019 – Jun 2020)
- (Albania) Edison Kapo (Aug 2020 – Jun 2021)
