= Tofik Jashari Stadium =

Sports venue in Shijak, Albania

- Interactive map of Tofik Jashari Stadium
- Full name: Stadiumi Tofik Jashari
- Location: Rruga E Stadiumit, Shijak, Durrës County, Albania
- Coordinates: 41°34′58″N 19°55′55″E
- Owner: Municipality of Shijak
- Operator: Municipality of Shijak
- Capacity: 1,500
- Surface: Grass
- Field size: 100 by 74 metres (109 yd × 81 yd)

Construction
- Renovated: 2016

Tenant
- KF Erzeni

The Tofik Jashari Stadium (Albanian: Stadiumi Tofik Jashari), is a stadium in Shijak, Albania. It is primarily used for football matches and it is the home ground of Albanian First Division club KF Erzeni.
