= Alush Noga Stadium =

Multi-purpose stadium in Patos, Albania

Coordinates: 40.6839°N 19.6272°E

- Interactive map of Alush Noga Stadium
- Former names: Fusha Sportive Patos
- Location: Patos, Albania
- Owner: Patos Municipality
- Capacity: 2,150
- Surface: Natural grass

Construction
- Renovated: 2013, 2016
- Cost: 5,100,000 lek (€36,210)

Tenants
- KF Albpetrol; Bylis Ballsh (2002)

Alush Noga Stadium is a multi-use stadium in Patos, Albania. The stadium has a capacity of 2,150 people and it is mostly used for football matches and it is the home ground of KS Albpetrol.

== History ==
Following KF Albpetrol's promotion to the Albanian First Division in 2013, Patos Municipality funded the reconstruction of the stadium which was previously just a playing field surrounded by grass where a total of 4,000 to 5,000 spectators were able to stand or sit on to see the field from an elevated position. The stadium had just one main stand which housed all of the facilities on offer, and in September 2013 work began on the construction of concrete stands to turn the stadium into an all seater with a capacity of around 3,000.

In 2016, the stadium received 2,100 plastic seats from the Qemal Stafa Stadium following its demolition, and the seats were installed onto the concrete stands which lowered the capacity to around 2,150 including the existing VIP seating in the main stand.
