= Luz i Vogël Stadium =

Football stadium in Albania

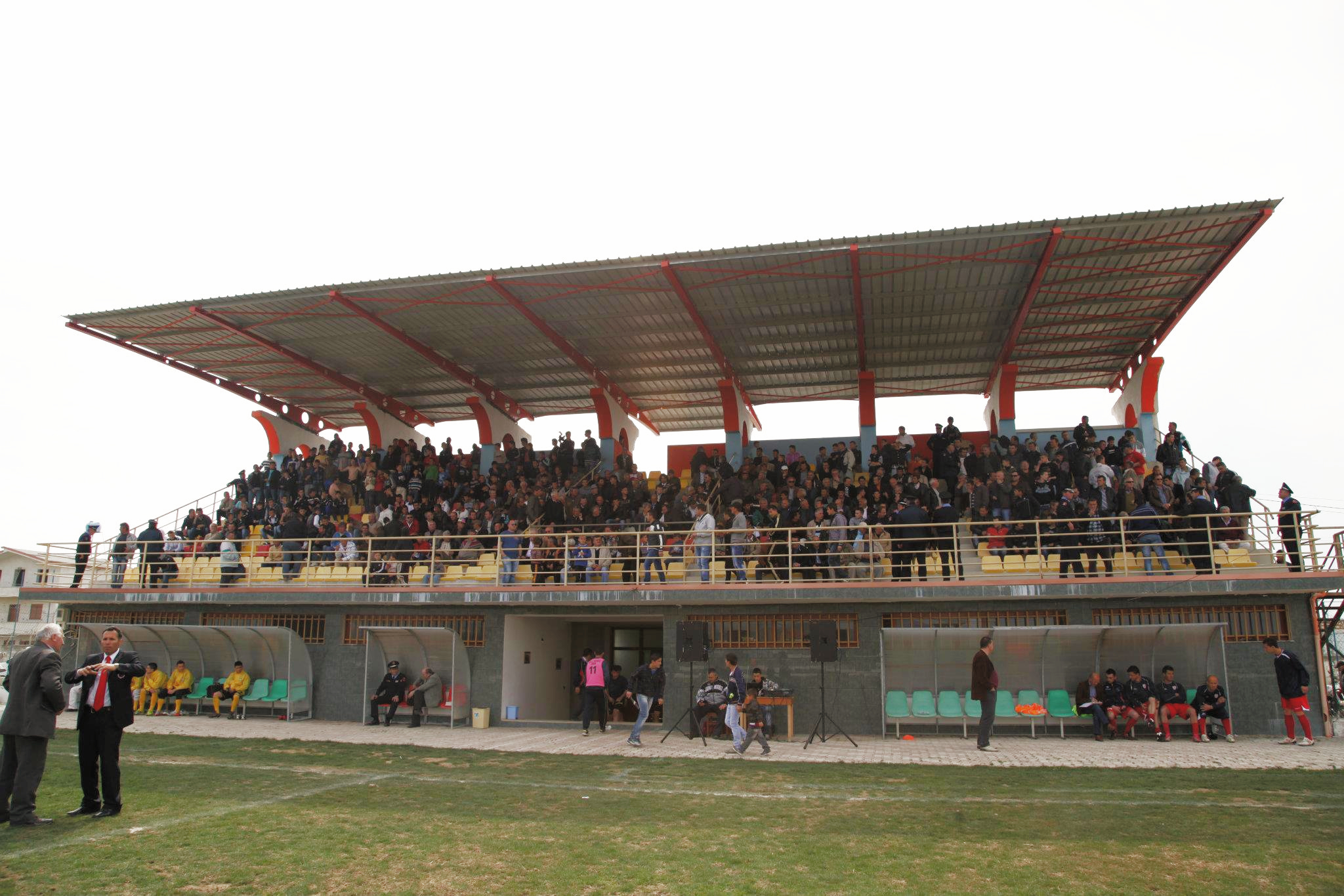
- Location: Luz i Vogël, Kavajë, Albania
- Owner: Council of Luz i Vogël
- Operator: KF Luzi 2008
- Capacity: 549
- Surface: Natural grass
- Field size: 101m by 65m

Construction
- Groundbreaking: 2008
- Opened: 2008
- Renovated: 2013-2014

Tenants
- KF Luzi 2008; Besa Kavajë (some Cup and friendly matches)

Luz i Vogel Stadium (Albanian: Stadiumi Luz i Vogël 2008) is a purpose-built stadium in Kavajë Municipality. The stadium was built in 2008 by the Luz i Vogël council and was paid for by them, with a seated capacity of 549 supporters. The stadium is also used by Besa Kavajë for friendly games and Albanian Cup fixtures.

== Investment ==
In November 2008, the president of the club Lavdim Lusha and two of his brothers from the small town of Luz i Vogël made clear their ambitions of investing up to 400,000 euros into the club's stadium. The three brothers Lavdim, Sokoli and Albert Lusha made the news public at an AFA event in the town which was attended by both the presidents of Teuta Durrës and Besa Kavajë.

== Renovation ==
Renovation on the stadium began in 2013 following the end of the 2012–13 season, and was completed in March 2014, in time for the club's home game against FK Vora. The club played their home games in Rrogozhinë at the stadium of KS Egnatia while the renovation took place, which included the reconstruction of the pitch. In the inauguration led by the club's joint presidents and brothers Lavdrim and Albert Lusha, the president of the Albanian Football Association Armand Duka was invited.
