= Shirokë, Albania =

Coordinates: 42.059426°N 19.453096°E

Shiroka
- Shirokë
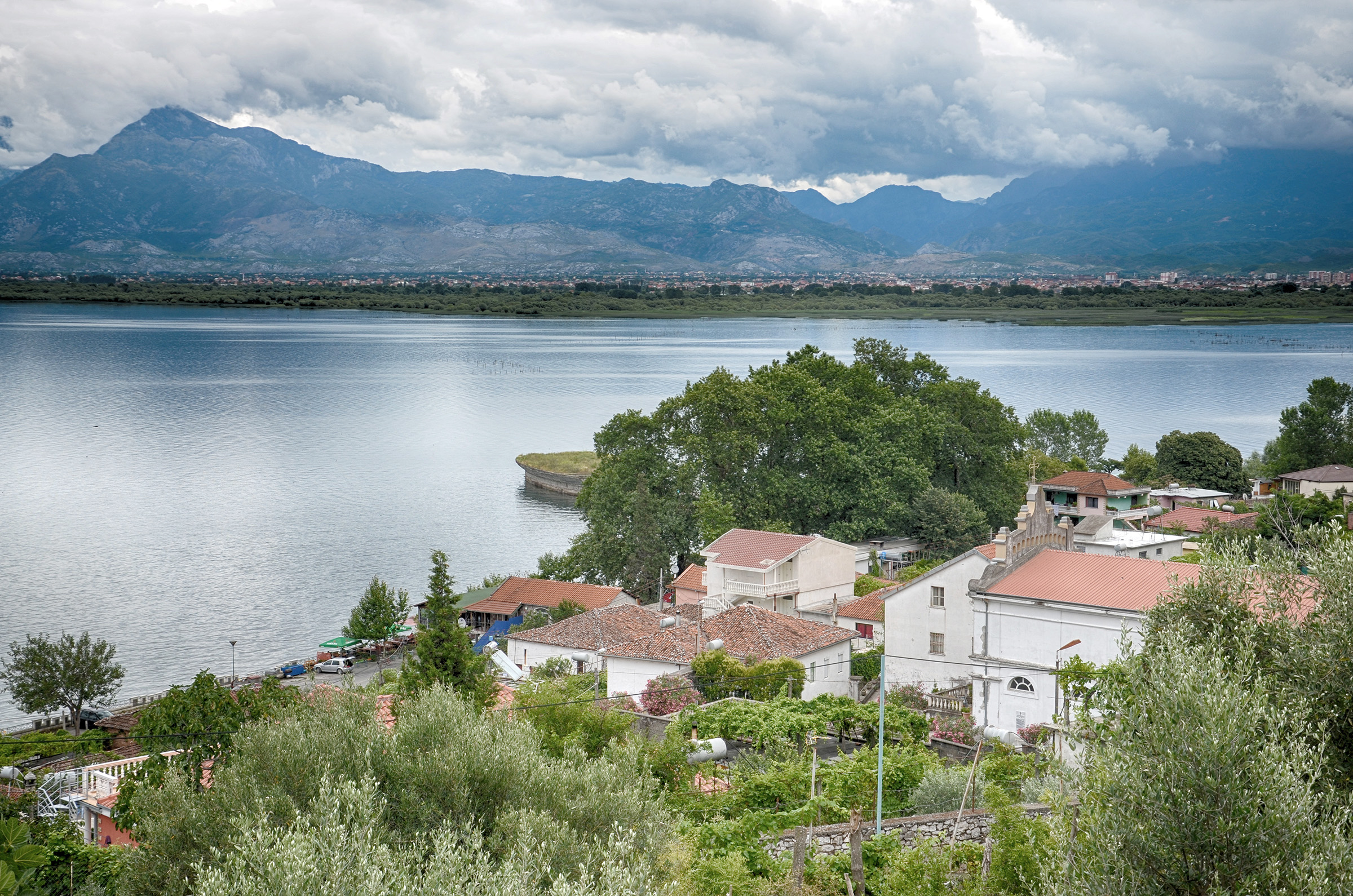
- The Lake Shkodër by Shirokë
- Interactive map of Shiroka
- County: Shkodër County
- Municipality: Shkodër
- Elevation: 10 m (33 ft)

Population (2006)
  - Total: 1,304

Shiroka (Gheg Albanian: Shirokë) is a village located about 5 kilometers west of Shkodër in northern Albania. It is located in the shores of Lake Skadar and 5 kilometers from the border with Montenegro. The village is located in the northern slopes of Tarabosh Mountain and had 1,300 inhabitants in 2006.

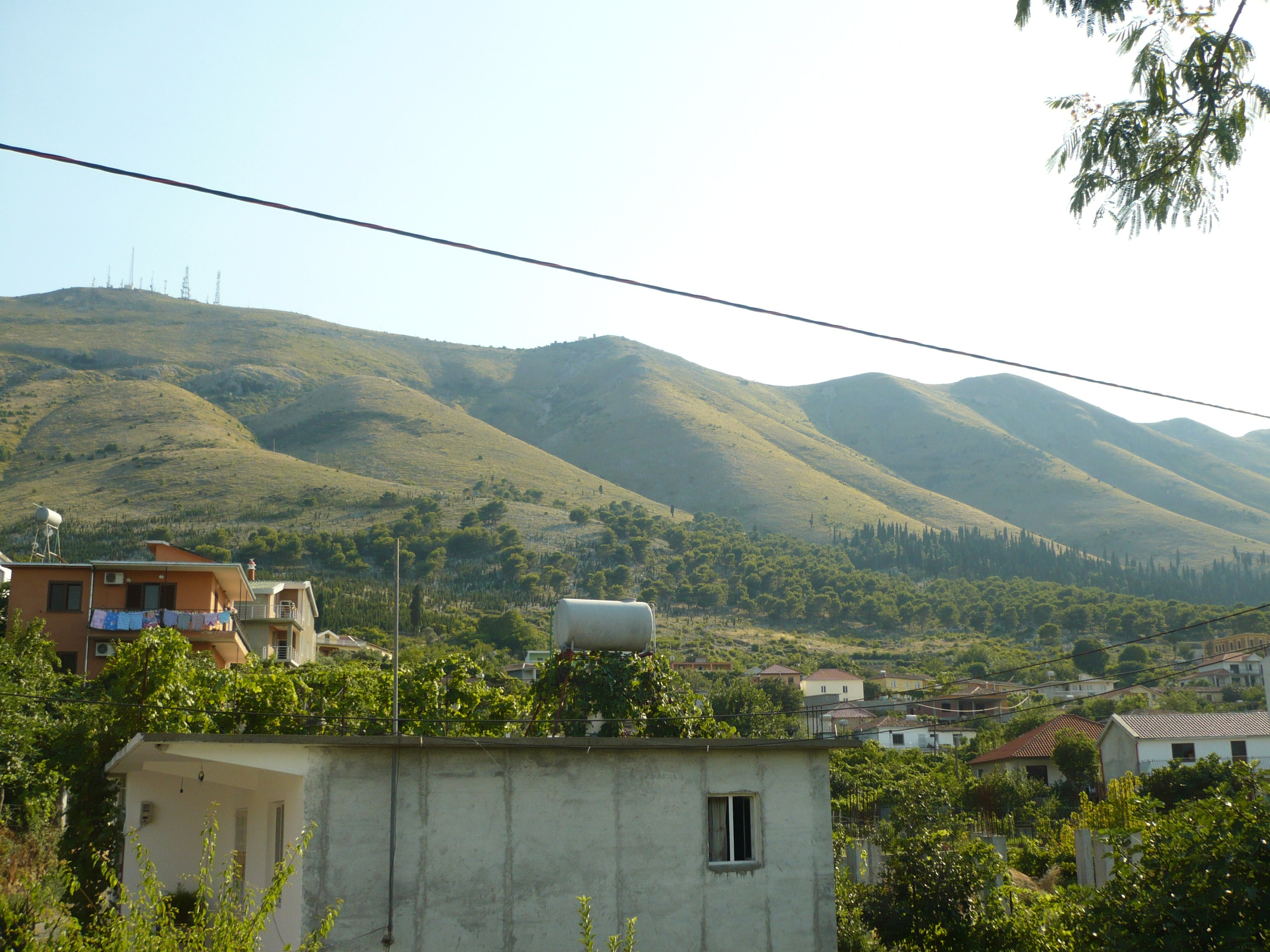
Tarabosh Mountain seen from Shirokë

== Location and tourism ==
Shiroka is separated from the city of Shkodra by Buna, which is an outflow from Lake Skadar. Another almost five kilometers further west is the village of Zogaj, which is significantly smaller. The villages belong to the Administrative Administrative Zone No. 1 of the city of Shkodra, thus are considered a neighborhood (lagja) of the municipality of Shkodra. The national road SH24 goes along the shore of the lake - but a border crossing to Montenegro does not exist yet as of 2025.

Shiroka and the neighboring village of Zogaj form a popular vacationing zones on the lake, that offers relaxation to its visitors. In Shiroka there are various restaurants and accommodations. It is also possible to swim in the lake or hike on the mountains close by. The tourism sector has significantly expanded during 2010s. Fishing has a long tradition in the village, while local women are known for the carpets they make.

== History ==
The oldest mention of the village dates back to the 15th century.

A road to Shkodra was built in 1909 and 1910. Shiroka occasionally served as a port for steamship traffic from Virpazar in Montenegro to Shkodra.

In Shiroka on the slope above the historic village center stands Zogu's Villa, a hardly ever used residence of the Albanian king Ahmet Zog from the 1920s, allegedly built by Kolë Idromeno with money from merchants from Shkodra. The communists used the building as a holiday home for pioneers.

From the village comes the well-known Franciscan, politician and writer Anton Harapi (1888-1946), who fell victim to the communist regime.

== People from Shiroka ==
- Anton Harapi
