= Reshit Rusi Stadium =

Albanian stadium

- Fusha Sportive Reshit Rusi
- Interactive map of Reshit Rusi Stadium
- Location: Shkodër, Albania
- Coordinates: 42°4′21.2″N 19°31′35.1″E
- Owner: Shkodër municipality
- Operator: Shkodër municipality Vllaznia Shkodër
- Capacity: 1,200
- Surface: Artificial grass

Construction
- Renovated: 2015

Tenants
- Vllaznia Shkodër (2015–16); Ada Velipojë; Veleçiku Koplik; Vllaznia Shkodër (youth); Vllaznia Shkodër (women)

Fusha Sportive Reshit Rusi is a multi-use stadium in Shkodër, Albania.
