= Arbëri =

Arbëri is an Albanian surname. It may refer to the following family of Albanian football players:

- Arben Arbëri (born 1964), Albanian footballer
- Klodian Arbëri (born 1979), Albanian footballer
- Theodhor Arbëri (born 1953), brother of Arben and Klodian, father of Polizoi and Gersi
  - Gersi Arbëri (born 1983), son of Theodhor
  - Polizoi Arbëri (born 1988), son of Theodhor
