= 2021–22 Kategoria e Parë =

Kategoria e Parë
- Season: 2021–22
- Dates: 11 September 2021 – 7 May 2022
- Champions: Bylis; 5th title
- Promoted: Bylis; Erzeni
- Relegated: Pogradeci; Butrinti; Maliqi; Vora; Shkumbini
- Matches: 240
- Goals: 584 (2.43 per match)
- Top goalscorer: Eridon Qardaku (20 goals)
- Biggest home win: Pogradeci 6−0 Shkumbini (16 April 2022)
- Biggest away win: Besëlidhja 0−5 Burreli (17 October 2021); Shkumbini 0−5 Tomori (23 October 2021)
- Highest scoring: Apolonia 6−1 Vora (7 May 2022); Butrinti 5−2 Shkumbini (30 October 2021); Bylis 4−3 Butrinti (30 April 2022); Shkumbini 2−5 Besëlidhja (19 March 2022); Tomori 5−2 Maliqi (30 October 2021); Tomori 5−2 Shkumbini (26 February 2022); Turbina 4−3 Tomori (30 April 2022)
- Longest winning run: 9 matches Bylis
- Longest unbeaten run: 13 matches Erzeni
- Longest winless run: 19 matches Shkumbini
- Longest losing run: 18 matches Shkumbini

The 2021–22 Kategoria e Parë was the 74th official season of the Albanian football second-tier since its establishment. The season began on 11 September 2021 and ended on 7 May 2022. There were 16 teams competing this season. The winning and runner-up teams gained promotion to the 2022-23 Kategoria Superiore. The promotion play-offs winner played a promotion play-off match against the 8th ranked team of the 2021–22 Kategoria Superiore. Bylis and Erzeni were promoted to the 2022–23 Kategoria Superiore. Butrinti, Maliqi, Pogradeci, Shkumbini and Vora were relegated to the 2022–23 Kategoria e Dytë.

== Changes from last season ==
=== Team changes ===
==== From Kategoria e Parë ====
Promoted to Kategoria Superiore:

- Dinamo Tirana
- Egnatia

Relegated to Kategoria e Dytë:

- Elbasani
- Flamurtari
- Oriku
- Partizani B
- Veleçiku

==== To Kategoria e Parë ====
Relegated from Kategoria Superiore:

- Apolonia
- Bylis

Promoted from Kategoria e Dytë:

- Butrinti
- Maliqi
- Shkumbini
- Tërbuni

== Locations ==
2021–22 Kategoria e Parë teams.

=== Stadia by capacity and locations ===
Team	Location	Stadium	Capacity
Apolonia	Fier	Loni Papuçiu Stadium	6,800
Besa	Kavajë	Luz i Vogël Stadium	600
Besëlidhja	Lezhë	Brian Filipi Stadium	5,000
Burreli	Burrel	Liri Ballabani Stadium	3,000
Butrinti	Sarandë	Andon Lapa Stadium	5,500
Bylis	Ballsh	Adush Muça Stadium	5,200
Erzeni	Shijak	Tofik Jashari Stadium	4,000
Korabi	Peshkopi	Korabi Stadium	6,000
Lushnja	Lushnjë	Roza Haxhiu Stadium	8,500
Maliqi	Maliq	Skënderbeu Stadium	12,343
Pogradeci	Pogradec	Gjorgji Kyçyku Stadium	10,700
Shkumbini	Peqin	Shkumbini Stadium	9,000
Tërbuni	Pukë	Ismail Xhemali Stadium	1,950
Tomori	Berat	Tomori Stadium	17,890
Turbina	Cërrik	Nexhip Trungu Stadium	6,600
Vora	Vorë	Internacional Complex	1,000

== League table ==
Pos	Team	Pld	W	D	L	GF	GA	GD	Pts	Promotion or relegation
1	Bylis (C, P)	30	22	3	5	51	18	+33	69	Promotion to 2022–23 Kategoria Superiore
2	Erzeni (P)	30	21	4	5	57	18	+39	67	Promotion to 2022–23 Kategoria Superiore
3	Korabi	30	17	8	5	35	22	+13	59	Promotion play-off to 2022–23 Kategoria Superiore
4	Apolonia	30	16	3	11	44	25	+19	51	Promotion play-off to 2022–23 Kategoria Superiore
5	Tërbuni	30	12	11	7	21	16	+5	47	Promotion play-off to 2022–23 Kategoria Superiore
6	Tomori	30	12	8	10	45	31	+14	44	Promotion play-off to 2022–23 Kategoria Superiore
7	Lushnja	30	10	12	8	31	27	+4	42	
8	Burreli	30	10	11	9	30	24	+6	41	
9	Besa	30	12	4	14	36	40	−4	40	
10	Besëlidhja	30	12	3	15	45	54	−9	39	
11	Pogradeci (R)	30	10	8	12	32	37	−5	38	Relegation play-out to 2022–23 Kategoria e Dytë
12	Turbina (O)	30	11	4	15	31	44	−13	37	Relegation play-out to 2022–23 Kategoria e Dytë
13	Butrinti (R)	30	9	7	14	32	36	−4	34	Relegation to 2022–23 Kategoria e Dytë
14	Maliqi (R)	30	6	5	19	32	62	−30	23	Relegation to 2022–23 Kategoria e Dytë
15	Vora (R)	30	5	6	19	32	54	−22	21	Relegation to 2022–23 Kategoria e Dytë
16	Shkumbini (R)	30	5	3	22	30	76	−46	18	Relegation to 2022–23 Kategoria e Dytë

Source: Soccerway
Rules for classification: 1) Points; 2) Head-to-head points; 3) Head-to-head goal difference; 4) Head-to-head goals scored; 5) Goal difference; 6) Goals scored; 7) Draw.
(C) Champions; (O) Play-off winners; (P) Promoted; (R) Relegated

=== Results ===
Home \ Away	APO	BES	BSË	BUR	BUT	BYL	ERZ	KOR	LUS	MAL	POG	SHK	TËR	TOM	TUR	VOR
Apolonia	—	2–1	0–3	4–0	1–0	3–0	0–1	3–2	3–0	3–0	2–0	2–1	0–1	1–0	2–0	6–1
Besa	1–2	—	2–0	3–1	1–1	3–2	0–1	1–1	2–0	1–0	0–3	4–0	2–0	2–1	2–1	2–0
Besëlidhja	2–1	2–1	—	0–5	2–1	0–2	0–4	2–0	2–2	4–1	2–2	2–0	0–3	3–3	3–1	2–0
Burreli	1–0	5–1	3–0	—	0–0	0–1	0–0	0–0	0–0	2–0	1–1	2–0	1–1	0–0	3–0	1–0
Butrinti	0–1	1–0	3–2	1–0	—	0–0	0–2	1–2	2–1	4–0	1–0	5–2	0–0	1–2	1–0	1–1
Bylis	1–0	2–0	1–0	1–0	4–3	—	1–0	4–0	1–0	2–1	1–0	4–0	3–0	3–0	4–0	2–1
Erzeni	1–1	4–1	1–0	1–0	3–1	0–1	—	0–0	4–1	1–0	4–0	3–1	1–0	2–1	3–1	2–2
Korabi	0–0	2–0	3–1	3–1	2–1	1–0	2–1	—	0–0	1–0	1–0	1–0	2–0	1–0	2–1	2–1
Lushnja	1–0	1–0	3–0	2–0	1–0	1–1	1–0	0–0	—	2–0	1–1	4–1	0–0	3–1	0–0	1–1
Maliqi	1–1	3–2	2–3	3–0	1–1	0–4	0–4	1–1	2–0	—	2–3	2–1	1–1	1–2	1–1	2–1
Pogradeci	2–1	0–0	1–0	1–1	1–0	1–2	0–3	0–0	1–0	2–3	—	6–0	1–0	0–3	1–2	2–1
Shkumbini	0–2	2–2	2–5	0–1	1–2	2–0	3–2	0–2	0–3	3–1	1–1	—	1–2	0–5	2–3	2–1
Tërbuni	1–0	1–0	1–0	0–0	1–0	0–0	0–2	2–0	0–0	3–0	1–0	0–0	—	0–0	1–0	1–0
Tomori	2–0	2–0	1–0	0–0	0–0	0–1	0–1	0–2	2–0	5–2	1–1	5–2	0–0	—	4–0	1–0
Turbina	2–1	0–1	3–1	1–2	1–0	2–1	0–2	1–0	0–0	1–0	0–1	1–2	1–1	4–3	—	2–0
Vora	0–2	0–1	2–4	0–0	4–1	0–2	1–4	1–2	3–3	3–2	3–0	3–1	1–0	1–1	0–2	—

Source: Soccerway
Legend: Blue = home team win; Yellow = draw; Red = away team win.
For upcoming matches, an "a" indicates there is an article about the rivalry between the two participants.

=== Positions by round ===
The table lists the positions of teams after each week of matches.

Team ╲ Round	1	2	3	4	5	6	7	8	9	10	11	12	13	14	15	16	17	18	19	20	21	22	23	24	25	26	27	28	29	30
Apolonia	12	8	7	12	12	9	9	10	12	9	10	8	10	8	7	8	5	4	5	4	4	4	4	4	4	4	4	4	4	4
Besa	4	3	5	9	8	5	6	6	5	6	5	6	6	6	8	7	8	8	7	8	7	8	8	8	7	7	8	8	11	9
Besëlidhja	14	16	15	16	16	16	15	13	11	10	12	12	9	11	11	12	9	11	9	11	11	10	9	9	9	9	9	10	9	10
Burreli	8	11	14	6	6	8	5	5	7	11	9	11	8	7	5	6	7	6	8	7	8	7	7	7	8	8	7	7	7	8
Butrinti	6	9	4	6	9	10	7	7	6	8	9	9	11	10	10	11	12	12	11	12	13	11	11	11	13	13	13	13	13	13
Bylis	1	2	1	1	1	1	1	1	1	1	1	1	1	1	1	1	1	1	1	1	1	1	1	1	1	1	1	1	1	1
Erzeni	7	10	11	5	4	3	2	2	2	2	2	2	2	2	2	2	2	2	2	2	2	2	2	2	2	2	2	2	2	2
Korabi	2	1	2	2	3	2	3	3	3	3	3	3	3	3	3	3	3	3	3	3	3	3	3	3	3	3	3	3	3	3
Lushnja	15	14	16	13	14	11	11	11	13	13	13	13	13	15	13	10	10	9	10	9	9	9	10	10	10	10	10	9	8	7
Maliqi	3	4	8	10	13	13	14	14	15	16	16	16	15	14	16	16	16	16	16	16	16	16	16	14	14	14	14	15	15	14
Pogradeci	13	13	13	15	11	14	12	12	10	12	11	10	12	12	12	14	13	10	12	10	10	12	12	13	12	12	12	12	10	11
Shkumbini	5	7	3	3	2	7	10	9	9	7	6	7	7	9	9	9	11	13	13	14	15	15	15	16	16	16	16	16	16	16
Tërbuni	9	12	6	4	5	6	8	8	8	5	4	5	4	4	6	5	6	7	6	5	5	6	6	5	6	6	6	5	5	5
Tomori	16	15	9	8	7	4	4	4	4	4	7	4	5	5	4	4	4	5	4	6	6	5	5	6	5	5	5	6	6	6
Turbina	10	5	12	14	15	15	16	16	14	15	15	15	16	16	14	15	15	15	15	15	12	13	13	12	11	11	11	11	12	12
Vora	11	6	10	11	10	12	13	15	16	14	14	14	14	13	15	13	14	14	14	13	14	14	14	15	15	15	15	14	14	15

Leader and promotion to 2022−23 Kategoria Superiore
Promotion to 2022−23 Kategoria Superiore
Promotion play-off
Relegation play-off
Relegation to 2022–23 Kategoria e Dytë

== Promotion play-offs ==
=== Bracket ===
Semi-finals
Korabi	1
Tomori	0
Apolonia	1
Tërbuni	0

Final
Korabi	3
Apolonia	2

=== Semi-finals ===
14 May 2022
16:00

Korabi	1−0	Tomori
Geci 41'

Korabi Stadium, Peshkopi

14 May 2022
16:00

Apolonia	1−0	Tërbuni
Krasniqi 20' (pen.)

Loni Papuçiu Stadium, Fier

=== Final ===
23 May 2022
17:00

Korabi	3−2	Apolonia
Geci 1'; Mziu 65'; Marku 80'		Krasniqi 5'; Diop 90+5'

Niko Dovana Stadium, Durrës
Referee: Eldorjan Hamiti

Korabi qualified to the final play-off match.

== Relegation play-offs ==
14 May 2022
15:00

Pogradeci	1−2	Oriku
Vieira 73'		Qejvani 25' (pen.); Çaushaj 38'

Shkumbini Stadium, Peqin
Referee: Kridens Meta

Pogradeci was relegated to Kategoria e Dytë, while Oriku was promoted to Kategoria e Parë.

14 May 2022
15:00

Turbina	1−0	Devolli
Marquinhos 90' (pen.)

Niko Dovana Stadium, Durrës
Referee: Albano Stolaj

Both teams remained in their respective leagues.

== Top scorers ==
Rank	Player	Club	Goals
1	(Albania) Eridon Qardaku	Bylis	20
2	(Albania) Redon Danaj	Besëlidhja	17
3	(Albania) Aldrit Oshafi	Tomori	15
3	(Albania) Jasmin Raboshta	Erzeni	15
5	(Albania) Taulant Marku	Korabi	13
6	(Nigeria) Chinonso Onuh	Butrinti/Shkumbini	12
6	(Albania) Ersil Ymeri	Erzeni	12
