= 2022–23 Kategoria e Parë =

Kategoria e Parë
- Season: 2022–23
- Champions: Skënderbeu; 4th title
- Promoted: Skënderbeu; Dinamo Tirana
- Relegated: Oriku; Turbina; Tërbuni; Besëlidhja
- Matches: 182
- Goals: 416 (2.29 per match)
- Top goalscorer: Abdul Temitope; Denisson Silva (12 goals each)
- Biggest home win: Dinamo 5−0 Burreli (18 September 2022); Dinamo 5−0 Lushnja (10 December 2022)
- Biggest away win: Besëlidhja 0−4 Dinamo (4 March 2023); Dinamo 1−5 Flamurtari (24 October 2022); Turbina 0−4 Skënderbeu (23 April 2023)
- Highest scoring: Apolonia 5−2 Turbina (10 September 2022)
- Longest winning run: 4 matches Luzi 2008
- Longest unbeaten run: 15 matches Skënderbeu
- Longest winless run: 12 matches Besëlidhja
- Longest losing run: 7 matches Tërbuni

The 2022–23 Kategoria e Parë was the 75th official season of the Albanian football second-tier since its establishment. The season began on 3 September 2022 and ended on 18 May 2023. There were 14 teams competing this season. The winning and runner-up teams gained promotion to the 2023–24 Kategoria Superiore. The promotion play-offs winner will play a promotion play-off match against the 8th ranked team of the 2022–23 Kategoria Superiore. Dinamo Tirana and Skënderbeu were promoted to the 2023–24 Kategoria Superiore. Besëlidhja, Oriku, Tërbuni and Turbina were relegated to the 2023–24 Kategoria e Dytë.

== Changes from last season ==
=== Team changes ===
==== From Kategoria e Parë ====
Promoted to Kategoria Superiore:

- Bylis
- Erzeni

Relegated to Kategoria e Dytë:

- Butrinti
- Maliqi
- Pogradeci
- Shkumbini
- Vora

==== To Kategoria e Parë ====
Relegated from Kategoria Superiore:

- Dinamo Tirana
- Skënderbeu

Promoted from Kategoria e Dytë:

- Flamurtari
- Luzi 2008
- Oriku

== Locations ==
2022–23 Kategoria e Parë teams.

=== Stadia by capacity and locations ===
Team	Location	Stadium	Capacity
Apolonia	Fier	Loni Papuçiu Stadium	6,800
Besa	Kavajë	Shkumbini Stadium	9,000
Besëlidhja	Lezhë	Brian Filipi Stadium	5,000
Burreli	Burrel	Liri Ballabani Stadium	3,000
Dinamo Tirana	Tirana	Selman Stërmasi Stadium	9,500
Flamurtari	Vlorë	Flamurtari Stadium	8,200
Korabi	Peshkopi	Korabi Stadium	6,000
Lushnja	Lushnjë	Roza Haxhiu Stadium	8,500
Luzi 2008	Luz i Vogël	Luz i Vogël Stadium	600
Oriku	Orikum	Orikum Stadium	
Skënderbeu	Korçë	Skënderbeu Stadium	12,343
Tërbuni	Pukë	Ismail Xhemali Stadium	1,950
Tomori	Berat	Tomori Stadium	17,890
Turbina	Cërrik	Nexhip Trungu Stadium	6,600

== League table ==
Pos	Team	Pld	W	D	L	GF	GA	GD	Pts	Promotion or relegation
1	Skënderbeu (C, P)	26	13	10	3	37	13	+24	49	Promotion to 2023–24 Kategoria Superiore
2	Dinamo Tirana (P)	26	14	5	7	48	23	+25	47	Promotion to 2023–24 Kategoria Superiore
3	Flamurtari	26	13	7	6	40	16	+24	46	Promotion play-off to 2023–24 Kategoria Superiore
4	Tomori	26	13	4	9	29	27	+2	43	Promotion play-off to 2023–24 Kategoria Superiore
5	Korabi	26	10	9	7	32	24	+8	39	Promotion play-off to 2023–24 Kategoria Superiore
6	Apolonia	26	10	8	8	31	30	+1	38	Promotion play-off to 2023–24 Kategoria Superiore
7	Luzi 2008	26	10	8	8	31	26	+5	38	
8	Besa	26	10	7	9	32	26	+6	37	
9	Lushnja (O)	26	8	8	10	30	42	−12	32	Relegation play-out to 2023–24 Kategoria e Dytë
10	Burreli (O)	26	7	10	9	22	29	−7	31	Relegation play-out to 2023–24 Kategoria e Dytë
11	Oriku (R)	26	9	3	14	27	33	−6	30	Relegation to 2023–24 Kategoria e Dytë
12	Turbina (R)	26	7	5	14	24	45	−21	26	Relegation to 2023–24 Kategoria e Dytë
13	Tërbuni (Note: Tërbuni was excluded from the league and relegated to the Kategoria e Dytë for the next season, after a violent incident during a match against Turbina in the 21st round.) (D, R)	26	6	6	14	16	41	−25	24	Excluded from the league
14	Besëlidhja (Note: Besëlidhja was deducted 3 points after failing to show up in an away match against Korabi.) (R)	26	3	8	15	17	41	−24	14	Relegation to 2023–24 Kategoria e Dytë

Source: Soccerway
Rules for classification: 1) Points; 2) Head-to-head points; 3) Head-to-head goal difference; 4) Head-to-head goals scored; 5) Goal difference; 6) Goals scored; 7) Draw.
(C) Champions; (D) Disqualified; (O) Play-off winners; (P) Promoted; (R) Relegated

=== Results ===
Home \ Away	APO	BES	BSË	BUR	DIN	FLA	KOR	LUS	LUZ	ORI	SKË	TËR	TOM	TUR
Apolonia	—	0–0	3–1	2–1	1–3	1–0	1–1	3–0	1–0	1–0	0–1	1–0	0–1	5–2
Besa	2–1	—	2–0	3–0	0–2	1–4	1–1	1–0	0–0	0–1	0–0	3–0	0–0	5–1
Besëlidhja	1–2	2–1	—	1–1	0–4	0–3	0–1	2–2	0–1	1–0	0–0	2–3	0–1	1–0
Burreli	1–1	1–0	0–0	—	1–0	0–0	1–1	1–1	1–0	1–0	0–0	1–1	2–0	4–1
Dinamo Tirana	2–3	1–0	4–0	5–0	—	1–5	1–0	5–0	2–1	2–0	1–1	3–0	0–1	2–0
Flamurtari	3–1	2–0	2–2	1–0	0–1	—	1–1	3–0	1–2	3–0	0–0	3–0	0–1	1–0
Korabi	0–0	1–0	3–0	0–0	2–2	1–1	—	4–1	2–0	1–0	2–1	1–0	3–0	2–1
Lushnja	1–1	2–1	3–2	1–1	2–1	0–0	3–2	—	2–2	1–0	0–0	0–1	2–1	2–0
Luzi 2008	1–1	2–2	1–0	2–1	1–0	0–2	1–0	2–0	—	1–1	1–2	3–0	2–0	0–0
Oriku	3–0	0–1	1–0	2–1	2–4	0–1	1–1	4–2	3–2	—	1–0	0–0	2–1	0–1
Skënderbeu	4–1	0–1	1–1	4–1	0–0	1–1	2–0	2–0	2–1	4–1	—	2–0	1–0	3–0
Tërbuni	1–1	0–1	0–0	1–2	1–0	1–0	2–1	0–3	1–1	0–3	1–1	—	2–1	0–3
Tomori	0–0	3–3	2–1	1–0	1–1	2–0	3–1	2–1	0–2	2–1	0–1	2–1	—	2–0
Turbina	1–0	2–4	0–0	1–0	1–1	0–3	1–0	1–1	2–2	2–1	0–4	3–0	1–2	—

Legend: Blue = home team win; Yellow = draw; Red = away team win.
For upcoming matches, an "a" indicates there is an article about the rivalry between the two participants.

=== Positions by round ===
The table lists the positions of teams after each week of matches.

Team ╲ Round	1	2	3	4	5	6	7	8	9	10	11	12	13	14	15	16	17	18	19	20	21	22	23	24	25	26
Skënderbeu	3	8	12	7	6	4	4	4	5	4	3	4	3	2	2	2	1	2	1	1	1	1	1	1	1	1
Dinamo	1	2	1	1	1	1	2	2	2	2	1	1	1	1	1	1	3	3	3	2	2	2	2	2	2	2
Flamurtari	13	10	5	5	5	3	1	1	1	1	2	2	4	4	3	3	2	1	2	3	3	3	3	3	3	3
Tomori	9	5	9	6	8	11	13	13	13	9	8	8	8	8	9	8	6	5	6	5	5	5	5	4	4	4
Korabi	8	7	2	2	2	2	3	3	4	3	4	3	2	3	4	4	4	4	4	4	4	4	4	5	6	5
Apolonia	5	1	4	4	4	6	9	11	10	11	9	9	9	9	10	10	10	7	7	7	7	7	6	6	5	6
Luzi 2008	2	3	10	10	9	8	8	5	6	5	6	7	7	7	7	6	7	8	10	10	9	8	7	7	7	7
Besa	6	11	8	11	10	7	7	6	3	6	5	5	6	5	5	5	5	6	5	6	6	6	8	8	8	8
Lushnja	12	14	6	13	12	13	10	12	11	12	12	10	11	11	11	11	11	11	11	11	10	10	9	9	10	9
Burreli	11	9	13	8	11	12	12	9	9	10	10	12	10	10	8	7	8	9	8	8	8	9	10	10	9	10
Oriku	14	12	11	12	7	10	6	8	8	8	11	13	12	13	12	12	12	13	12	12	13	13	13	13	11	11
Turbina	10	13	14	14	14	14	14	14	14	14	14	13	13	14	13	14	13	12	13	13	12	12	11	11	12	12
Tërbuni	4	6	3	3	3	5	5	7	7	7	7	6	5	6	6	9	9	10	9	9	11	11	12	12	13	13
Besëlidhja	7	4	7	9	13	9	11	10	12	13	13	14	14	12	14	13	14	14	14	14	14	14	14	14	14	14

Leader and promotion to 2023−24 Kategoria Superiore
Promotion to 2023−24 Kategoria Superiore
Promotion play-off
Relegation play-off
Relegation to 2023–24 Kategoria e Dytë

== Promotion play-offs ==
=== Bracket ===
Semi-finals
Flamurtari	1
Apolonia	1
Tomori	0
Korabi	1

Final
Flamurtari	1
Korabi	2

=== Semi-finals ===
23 May 2023
16:00

Flamurtari	1−1	Apolonia
Pedro 45+6'		Umejiego 64'

Flamurtari Stadium, Vlorë
Referee: Eldorjan Hamiti

Flamurtari qualified to the final as the team with the higher ranking.

23 May 2023
16:00

Tomori	0−1	Korabi
		Keko 76'

Tomori Stadium, Berat
Referee: Indrit Myrtja

=== Final ===
28 May 2023
17:00

Flamurtari	1−2	Korabi
Kondaj 81'		Keko 45+1', 90+11'

Partizani Complex, Tirana
Referee: Juxhin Xhaja

Korabi qualified to the final play-off match.

== Relegation play-offs ==
23 May 2023
16:00

Lushnja	1−0	Valbona
Pepa 20'

Elbasan Arena, Elbasan
Referee: Kridens Meta

Both clubs remained in their respective divisions.

26 May 2023
16:00

Burreli	2−1	Pogradeci
Kurbneshi 56' (pen.); Deivid 70'		Ćirković 41'

Arena Egnatia, Rrogozhinë
Referee: Blerim Ziri

Both clubs remained in their respective divisions.

== Top scorers ==
Rank	Player	Club	Goals
1	(Ivory Coast) Abdul Temitope	Skënderbeu	12
1	(Brazil) Denisson Silva	Dinamo Tirana	12
3	(Albania) Albers Keko	Korabi	11
4	(Albania) Mikel Canka	Lushnja	10
4	(Nigeria) Mmesoma Umejiego	Apolonia	10
4	(Albania) Taulant Marku	Dinamo Tirana	10
7	(Nigeria) Chinonso Onuh	Besa	9
