= Kiichi =

- Gender: Male

Origin
- Origin: Japanese
- Meaning: Different meanings depending on the kanji used

Kiichi (written: 喜一, 喜市, 揆一, 起一, 驥一, 帰一 or 輝一) is a masculine Japanese given name. Notable people with the name include:

- Kiichi Aichi (愛知 揆一; 1907–1973), Japanese politician
- Kiichi Harada (原田 喜市; born 1972), Japanese equestrian
- Kiichi Hasegawa (長谷川 喜一; 1894–1944), Imperial Japanese Navy admiral
- Kiichi Inoue (井上 喜一; 1932–2010), Japanese politician
- Kiichi Kunimoto (国本 起一; born 1981), Japanese mixed martial artist
- Kiichi Matsuda (松田 喜一; 1887–1968), Japanese educator
- Kiichi Miyake (三宅 驥一; 1876–1964), Japanese botanist
- Kiichi Miyazawa (宮澤 喜一; 1919–2007), Japanese politician and Prime Minister of Japan
- Kiichi Nakai (中井 貴一; born 1961), Japanese actor
- Kiichi Oda (小田 喜一; 1913–1944), Japanese World War II flying ace
- Kiichi Okamoto (岡本 帰一; 1888–1930), Japanese painter and illustrator
- Kiichi Tomori (友利 貴一; born 1991), Japanese footballer
- Kiichi Yajima (矢島 輝一; born 1995), Japanese footballer
- Kiichi Yoshida (吉田 喜一; 1919–1944), Japanese swimmer
- Matthew Kiichi Heafy (born 1986), Japanese-born American musician

== See also ==
- Kiichi!!, a Japanese manga series
