= 1965–66 Albanian National Championship =

Albanian National Championship
- Season: 1965–66
- Champions: 17 Nëntori; 8th Albanian title
- Relegated: Erzeni
- European Cup: 17 Nëntori
- Cup Winners' Cup: None
- Matches: 132
- Goals: 313 (2.37 per match)
- Top goalscorer: Sajmir Dauti (13 goals)

The 1965–66 Albanian National Championship was the 28th season of the Albanian National Championship, the top professional league for association football clubs, since its establishment in 1930.

17 Nëntori won the Albanian National Championship.

== League table ==
Pos	Team	Pld	W	D	L	GF	GA	GR	Pts	Qualification or relegation
1	17 Nëntori (C)	22	18	2	2	53	14	3.786	38	Qualification for the European Cup first round (Note: 17 Nëntori and Partizani finished the season level on points so the Albanian Football Association decided to organise a championship playoff game to determine the winner of the 1965–66 Albanian National Championship.)
2	Partizani	22	17	4	1	45	12	3.750	38	
3	Dinamo Tirana	22	11	7	4	40	17	2.353	29	
4	Vllaznia	22	7	9	6	29	20	1.450	23	
5	Labinoti	22	7	8	7	29	32	0.906	22	
6	Lokomotiva Durrës	22	5	10	7	14	21	0.667	20	
7	Besa	22	5	9	8	18	26	0.692	19	
8	Skënderbeu	22	5	9	8	21	31	0.677	19	
9	Flamurtari	22	5	5	12	16	26	0.615	15	
10	Tomori	22	5	4	13	18	34	0.529	14	
11	Traktori	22	5	3	14	18	38	0.474	13	
12	Erzeni (R)	22	3	6	13	12	48	0.250	12	Relegation to the 1966–67 Kategoria e Dytë

Source: RSSSF.org
(C) Champions; (R) Relegated
Notes:

Note: '17 Nëntori' is Tirana, 'Labinoti' is Elbasani, 'Lokomotiva Durrës' is Teuta, 'Traktori' is Lushnja

== Results ==
Home \ Away	17N	BES	DIN	ERZ	FLA	LAB	LOK	PAR	SKË	TOM	TRA	VLL
17 Nëntori		3–1	2–1	11–0	1–0	1–2	3–0	2–1	4–1	3–1	6–2	2–1
Besa	1–2		1–1	0–0	2–1	0–0	1–0	1–1	2–0	1–0	3–0	0–2
Dinamo	1–2	3–0		5–0	4–0	3–0	0–0	0–1	4–0	3–1	3–1	0–0
Erzeni	0–3	1–1	1–2		2–1	0–1	1–1	0–0	0–0	1–0	0–1	2–0
Flamurtari	0–1	0–0	0–1	1–0		1–3	4–0	0–1	0–0	3–0	1–0	0–0
Labinoti	0–1	1–1	1–2	2–0	4–2		2–0	1–2	0–0	3–2	– (Note: The match between Labinoti and Traktori, which originally ended 0–2, was lost by 0–3 to both teams from Albanian Football Association.)	2–2
Lokomotiva	0–0	1–0	0–0	3–0	3–0	2–2		0–0	2–1	1–0	2–1	0–0
Partizani	1–0	3–0	1–1	6–1	2–0	5–2	1–0		5–2	4–0	3–1	1–0
Skënderbeu	0–2	2–2	1–1	3–1	2–1	0–0	1–1	0–2		3–0	2–1	1–0
Tomori	0–1	1–1	2–3	1–0	0–1	1–1	1–0	0–1	1–1		2–1	3–1
Traktori	1–3	1–0	1–0	4–0	0–0	0–2	0–0	1–3	1–0	0–1		1–3
Vllaznia	0–0	3–0	2–2	4–1	0–0	4–2	2–0	0–1	1–1	1–1	3–0	

Source: CalcioMondialeWeb.it
Legend: Blue = home team win; Yellow = draw; Red = away team win.

== Final ==
Team 1	Score	Team 2
17 Nëntori	2–1	Partizani
