= François Vincent Henri Antoine de Stuers =

Dutch general (1792–1881)

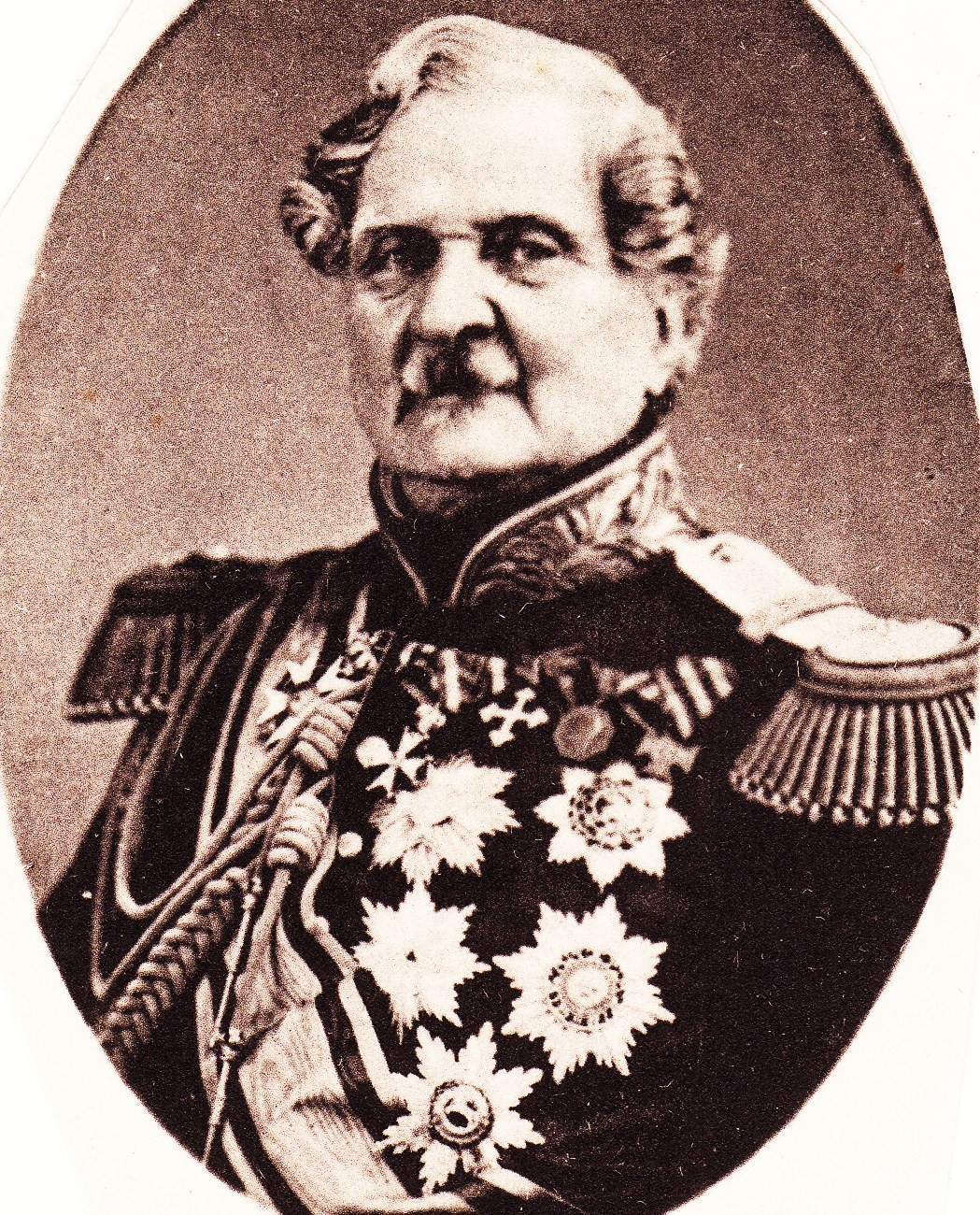
- General de Stuers
- Born: 29 November 1792; Roermond, Netherlands
- Died: 29 December 1881 (aged 89) The Hague, Netherlands
- Allegiance: Kingdom of the Netherlands
- Branch: Indian Army Infantry
- Service years: 1815–1858
- Conflicts: Napoleonic Wars; Battle of Quatre Bras; Battle of Waterloo; Java War
- Awards: Military Order of William; Order of the Oak Crown

François Vincent Henri Antoine de Stuers (29 November 1792 – 29 December 1881) was a Dutch general, commander of the Indies army.

== Biography ==
=== Napoleonic Wars and Java War ===
De Stuers grew up in 's-Heerenberg, because his parents left Limburg when the French approached.

On 29 March 1815, after Napoleon's landing in Cannes, he joined the fourth regiment of dragoons as a volunteer. He took part with his regiment in the campaigns in Brabant and France and later served as opperwachtmeester with Lieutenant General Tindal.

After being nominated twice for the rank of officer, first by General Gigny, then by Colonel Daijwaille, on 2 April 1816, at the suggestion of General Tindal, he was appointed a second lieutenant in the Sixth Infantry Battalion of the Standing Army.

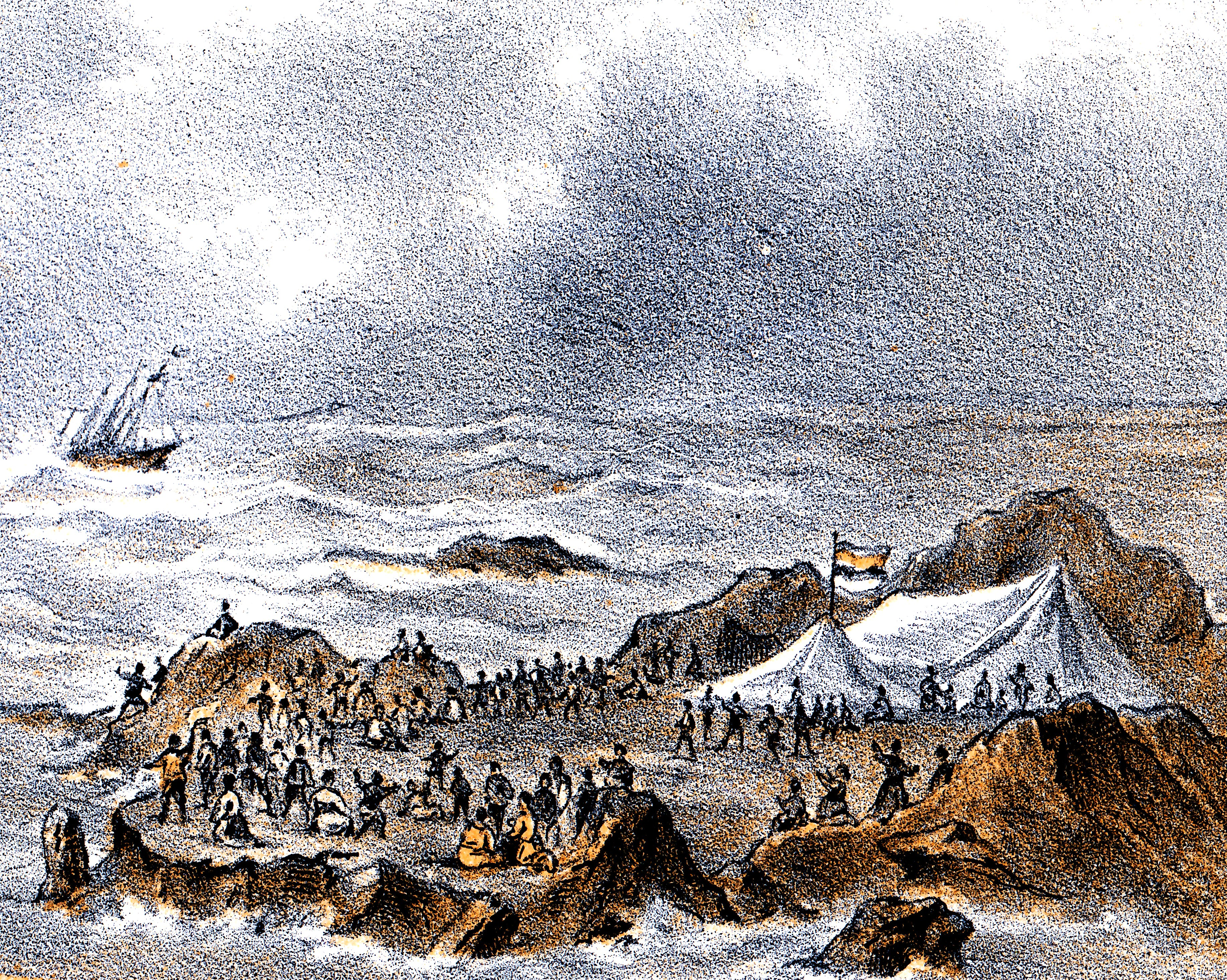
De Stuers was shipwrecked on the Lucipara Islands in 1837

He was transferred to the army in the East Indies at his request in 1820 and was appointed to the General Staff. In the same year, he took part in the expedition to Palembang, led by his father-in-law, General de Kock, and was present at the fighting at Kemaro, on the Plaju and near Palembang. For his efforts he was made a knight in the Military Order of William.

Initially De Stuers was assigned to the commander-in-chief of the army as a first lieutenant on 1 January 1824; after the appointment of General de Kock as governor-general, he retained De Stuers as private secretary. At the outbreak of the Java War, he accompanied General de Kock to the Vorstenlanden, the hotbed of the revolt, and there completed missions between Surakarta, where de Kock sought to reverse further undermining of Dutch rule, and Semarang, which was threatened with attack, but was soon secured with the return of General van Geen from Boni. De Stuers distinguished himself again at the siege and storming of Pleret on the 16th of April and the 9th of June 1826.

After five years of bloody war, Diponegoro was forced to negotiate in Magelang in March 1830 and, when it appeared that he was unwilling to submit, was sent by General de Kock as a prisoner of state to Batavia, where the governor general would decide his fate. Promoted to major on 14 August, De Stuers, with Captain Roeps and a detachment of hussars, led the mutiny to Semarang and then by steamer to Batavia. For his services from 1825 to 1830 he was promoted to officer of the Military Order of William.

=== Belgian revolt and later career ===
During his leave in the Netherlands in 1830, the Belgian Revolution broke out and De Stuers served as Chief of the Staff of the Troops in Zeeland from March 1831 to 1834, again under the orders of General de Kock. He was honorably mentioned (Dutch: Eervolle Vermelding) for his performances at the Kapitale Dam and during the retreat through Assenede.

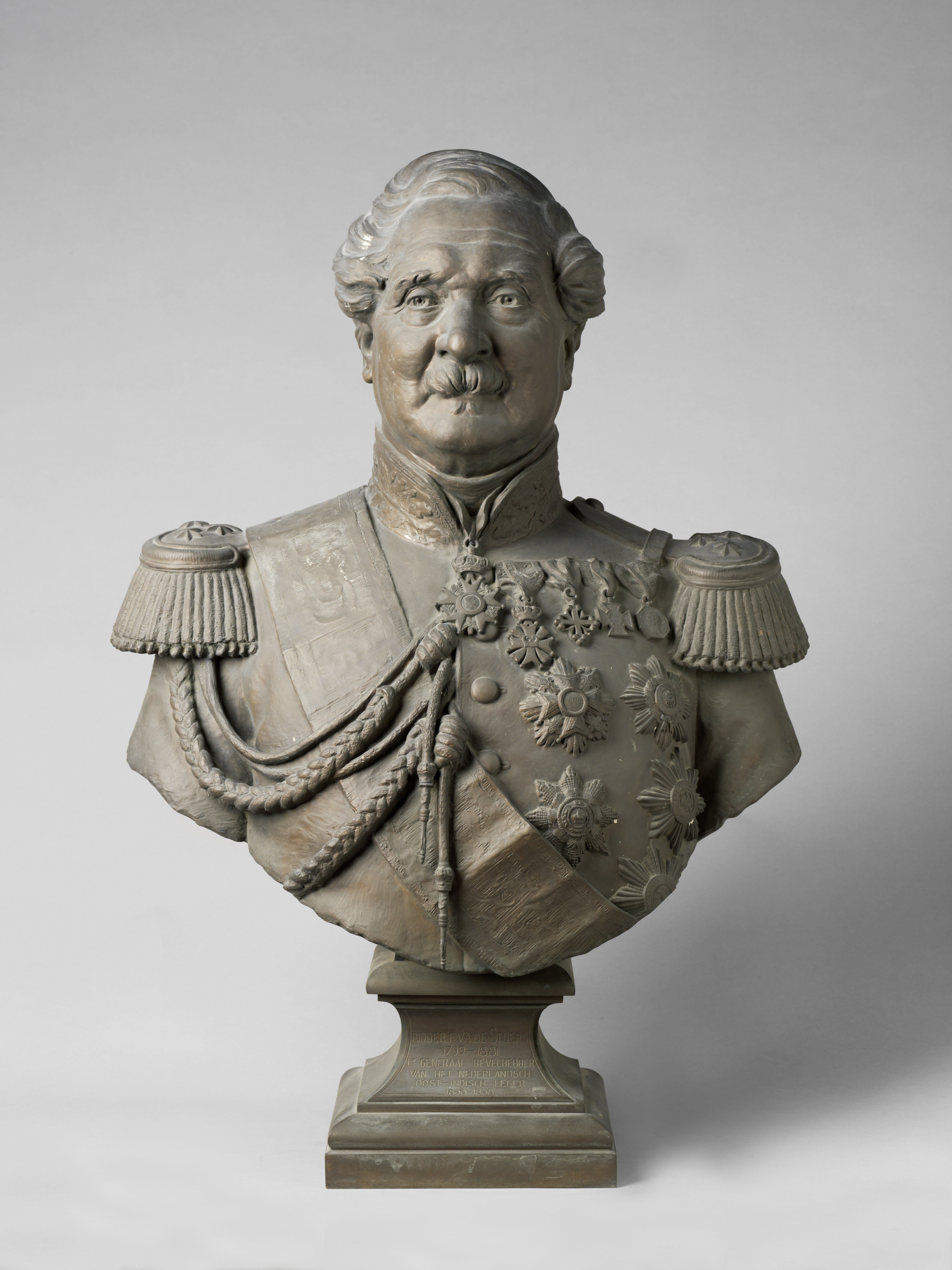
Bust of François de Stuers by Alphonse de Stuers (1902)

De Stuers returned to the Dutch East Indies in 1837 and soon acted as acting governor, then also as military commander of the Moluccas. On his way to the Indies he was shipwrecked on the coral reef of the Luciparas, where they behaved so heroically that all shipwrecked sailors were honorably mentioned by separate government decree. De Stuers later served at the Ministry of the Colonies, obtained the titular rank of major general, and was appointed aide-de-camp to the King in extraordinary service.

In 1853, as a senior officer, he fulfilled a special military assignment in France and in February of the following year he assumed command of the Dutch East Indies army as a lieutenant general in Batavia. During his tenure he completed the military operations on the west coast of Borneo (1854), in Tomori (1856), in Timor (1858), Lampung and Jambi. He also had to reorganize the Indian armed forces and defense resources in accordance with the Royal Decree adopted in August 1853 and on the proposals of Major General von Gagern. De Stuers invited First Lieutenant Weitzel to accompany him as adjutant. After five years, de Stuers was succeeded by Lieutenant General van Swieten.

Immediately after his return to the Netherlands, De Stuers was appointed adjutant-general with the rank of Grand Officer and Knight Grand Cross of the Netherlands Lion. In addition, he was Grand Cross of the Order of the Oak Crown, Grand Cross of the Order of the Red Eagle of Prussia, Grand Cross of the Order of Merit of the Bavarian Crown and of the Guelven of Old Hanover, Commander of the Legion of Honor, the Cross of St. Mauritius and the Cross of the Order of Saint Lazarus. He was president of the Association of the Red Cross (Dutch: Vereniging van het Rode Kruis). De Stuers published several writings, including his Memoires sur la guerre de l'île de Java (a Dutch translation of this work appeared in 1847, titled Gedenkschrift van de oorlog op Java van 1825 tot 1830 and translated by H.M. Lange).

=== Family ===
De Stuers was a son of Pierre Jean Bernard de Stuers, baron de l'Empire (1744-1811) and Petronille Jeanne Aloyse de la Court (1758-1848). He was a brother of General Hubert Joseph Jean Lambert de Stuers.

In 1828 he married Jkvr Adriane Jacqueline de Kock (Soerabaja, 1809 - The Hague, 1882), daughter of Governor-General Hendrik Merkus de Kock. Seven children were born to their marriage. One of the daughters married James Loudon.
