= Andi Bakiasi =

Albanian footballer

Personal information
- Full name: Andi Bakiasi
- Date of birth: 2 October 1988 (age 38)
- Place of birth: Lushnjë, Albania
- Height: 1.75 m (5 ft 9 in)
- Position: Defender

Team information
- Current team: Shkumbini
- Number: 15

Youth career
- –2008: Lushnja

Senior career*
Years	Team	Apps	(Gls)
2008	Lushnja	3	(0)
2009–2010	Skrapari	39	(0)
2010–2012	Teuta	26	(0)
2012	Tomori	3	(0)
2013	Luftëtari	3	(0)
2013–2015	Lushnja	44	(1)
2015–2016	Shkumbini	12	(0)
2017–2019	Egnatia	42	(0)
2019-	Shkumbini	9	(0)
- * Club domestic league appearances and goals as of 29 December 2018

Andi Bakiasi (born 2 October 1988) is an Albanian footballer who currently plays as a defender for Shkumbini in the Albanian First Division.
