= Hyseni =

Hyseni is an Albanian surname. Notable people with the surname include:

- Alessio Hyseni (born 1997), Albanian footballer
- Berat Hyseni (born 1986), Kosovar footballer
- Erald Hyseni (born 1999), Albanian footballer
- Haris Hyseni (born 1992), German-Kosovar footballer
- Klaudio Hyseni (born 1994), Albanian footballer
- Muhamet Hyseni (born 2001), Kosovan footballer
- Olti Hyseni (born 2007), Kosovan-Danish footballer
- Skënder Hyseni (born 1955), Kosovar Albanian politician
