= Vangjel Mile =

Albanian footballer (born 1986)

Personal information
- Full name: Vangjel Mile
- Date of birth: 1 July 1986 (age 40)
- Place of birth: Berat, Albania
- Height: 1.80 m (5 ft 11 in)
- Position: Striker

Senior career*
Years	Team	Apps	(Gls)
2004–2005	Dinamo Tirana	8	(1)
2005–2006	Kongsvinger	5	(0)
2006–2007	Dinamo Tirana	23	(4)
2007–2010	Teuta Durrës	72	(12)
2008–2010	→ Besa Kavajë (loan)	2	(0)
2010–2011	Laçi	30	(5)
2011–2012	Tomori Berat	31	(3)
2013	Shkumbini Peqin	10	(3)
2013–2014	Besa Kavajë	9	(0)
2014	Bylis Ballsh	3	(0)
2014	PK-35 Vantaa	11	(1)
2014–2015	Teuta Durrës	3	(0)
2015	Tomori Berat	12	(5)
2016	Erzeni	10	(1)
2016–2018	Egnatia	23	(15)

International career^{‡}
2001–2003	Albania U17	9	(2)
2003–2005	Albania U19	6	(2)
2006–2009	Albania U21	14	(2)

Managerial career
- 2023: Tirana U-17
- 2023–: Tirana U-19
- * Club domestic league appearances and goals as of 20 September 2017 ‡ National team caps and goals as of 27 August 2011

Vangjel Mile (born 1 July 1986) is an Albanian retired footballer who last played as a striker for Egnatia in the Albanian First Division.

== Club career ==
=== Early career ===
Mile joined the Norwegian First Division side Kongsvinger in February 2006 and after he received his work-permit he played five matches for the team in the 2006 Norwegian First Division.

=== Laçi ===
On 20 August 2017, Mile joined Albanian Superliga side Laçi on a one-year deal. He made his first appearance for Laçi in the goalless draw against his former side Teuta Durrës in the opening matchday one day later. His first score-sheet contributions came in the 4th matchday where he scored the winner against Elbasani. Mile concluded his first and only season at Laçi by netting 5 goals in 30 league appearances, as the team finished in a historic 4th place.

=== Shkumbini Peqin ===
In January 2013, Mile signed with fellow top flight side Shkumbini Peqin for the second part of 2012–13 season in their bid to escape relegation, joining his father who was the manager at that time. He stated that playing for Shkumbini was an honour and privilege, adding that he did not think twice about signing with the club. His made his first appearance for the club on 10 February by starting in a 3–0 defeat to Teuta Durrës. Shkumbini mathematically relegated after losing 1–0 to Laçi on 28 April, returning to the Albanian First Division after 19 years. Mile opened his scoring account for Shkumbini later on 4 May in the matchday 25 against Tomori Berat, netting a brace for a 2–1 win. One week later he scored another one as Shkumbini ended the season with a 2–1 win at Luftëtari Gjirokastër. Mile's contract run out following end of the season, and the parties decided to end their cooperation, making Mile a free agent in the process. He finished his Shkumbini Peqin career by making 10 league appearances and scoring 3 goals, in addition 3 matches and 1 goal in cup.

=== PK-35 Vantaa ===
In April 2014, after Bylis was banned from the championship, Mile moved for the second time outside the country and signed with PK-35 Vantaa of Ykkönen.

=== Tomori Berat ===
On 16 September 2015, Mile completed a transfer to Albanian First Division side Tomori Berat as a free agent.

=== Erzeni ===
In January 2016, Mile joined Albanian Second Division side Egnatia as a free agent.

=== Egnatia ===
In September 2016, Mile joined Albanian Second Division side Egnatia by penning a one-year contract. He was handed the captaincy and made his competitive debut on 16 October in a 2–0 away defeat to Partizani Tirana B in the second matchday. One week later, Mile scored a late goal home against Veleçiku Koplik as Egnatia overturned the score to win 2–1 in the last minutes. After going scoreless for 6 matches, 540 minutes, Mile returned to the scoresheet by netting a brace in a 2–0 home win over Internacional Tirana in the matchday 9. He scored his first goal of 2017 in a 2–1 home win over Partizani Tirana B, helping Egnatia to extend the league gap to 11 points. Mile scored his first hat-trick of the season on 7 May 2017 in the matchday 25 against Tirana B, finished in a 0–6 away win, which put him on double figures. Mile ended the regular season with 12 goals in 21 matches, as Egnatia finished first in Group A, returning to Albanian First Division after 10 years. In the grand final against the winner of Group B Naftëtari Kuçovë, managed by his father, Mile scored a brace, as Egnatia won 4–1 to be crowned as Albanian Second Division champion.

Mile extended his deal with the club for another season. In the opening matchday of Albanian First Division, Mile started and scored an early goal as Egnatia opened the championship with a 1–0 home win over Vllaznia Shkodër B.

== International career ==
Mile captained the Albanian U-19 team during qualifying for the 2006 UEFA European Under-17 Football Championship.

== Personal life ==
He is the son of Kristaq Mile who is the manager Naftëtari Kuçovë. He married Vojsava in May 2012.
