= Kono Yasui =

Japanese biologist and cytologist

- 保井コノ
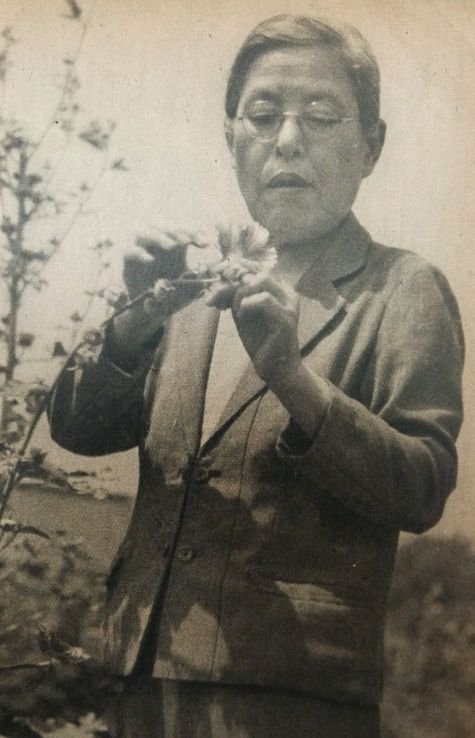
- Kono Yasui in 1948
- Born: 16 February 1880; Kagawa Prefecture
- Died: 21 March 1971 (aged 91); Bunkyō
- Awards: Medal with Purple Ribbon, Order of the Precious Crown, Third Class, Butterfly

Academic background
- Education: Women's Higher Normal School, University of Chicago, Harvard University
- Influences: E. C. Jeffrey

Academic work
- Institutions: Gifu Girls' Higher School and Kanda Girls' School, Women's Higher Normal School, Tokyo Imperial University, Ochanomizu University
- Main interests: biologist, cytologist
- Notable works: Cytologia

Kono Yasui (保井 コノ, Yasui Kono; 16 February 1880 – 24 March 1971) was a Japanese biologist and cytologist. In 1927, she became the first Japanese woman to receive a doctoral degree in science. She received a Medal of Honor with Purple Ribbon and was awarded an Order of the Precious Crown Third Class for her academic accomplishments and leadership in women’s education in Japan.

== Early life and education ==
Yasui was born in the village of Sanbonmatsu in Kagawa Prefecture in 1880, to the owner of a shipping business. She was the eldest of nine siblings and was raised by parents who valued and emphasized education. When she was moving from lower elementary to higher elementary school, her father persuaded her to read Encouragement of Learning, a highly influential book written by the philosopher and educator Yukichi Fukuzawa. Throughout her early education, she excelled in her studies, and was particularly gifted in science and mathematics. She graduated from Kagawa Prefecture Normal School in 1898 and the Division of Science at the Women's Higher Normal School in 1902. She taught at Gifu Girls' Higher School and Kanda Girls' School until 1905, when a graduate course was established at the Women's Higher Normal School. She was the first woman to enter the course with a major in science research; she focused on zoology and botany. She published a paper about the Weberian apparatus of carp fish in Zoological Science in 1905, becoming the first woman published in the journal. Her research on the aquatic fern Salvinia natans was published in the Journal of Plant Sciences and the British journal Annals of Botany, marking the first publication of a Japanese woman's research in a foreign journal. She completed the graduate program at Women's Higher Normal School in 1907 and became an assistant professor at the school.

== Academic career ==
When Yasui was endorsed by Kiichi Mitake to the Japanese Ministry of Education to study in Germany, they refused to give her permission because of their belief that “a woman cannot achieve much in science.” After being endorsed again by Fujii Kenjirō, the professor at University of Tokyo, she was only allowed on the condition that she listed "home economics research" alongside "scientific research" on her application and that she agreed not to marry and instead commit herself to her research. She traveled to Germany and the United States in 1914 to perform cytological research at the University of Chicago. She travelled to Harvard University in 1915, where she conducted research on coal under Professor E. C. Jeffrey. She returned to Japan in June 1916 and continued researching coal at Tokyo Imperial University (now the University of Tokyo) until 1927. She taught genetics there from 1918 to 1939, and was made a professor at the Women's Higher Normal School in Tokyo in 1919. She completed her doctoral thesis, "Studies on the structure of lignite, brown coal, and bituminous coal in Japan", in 1927, becoming the first woman in Japan to complete a doctorate in science.

In 1929, Yasui founded the cytology journal Cytologia. From 1924 onwards, she researched the genetics of poppies, corn and Tradescantia species, and in 1945 she began a survey of plants that had been affected by nuclear fallout after the atomic bombings of Hiroshima and Nagasaki. When Ochanomizu University was established under its current name in 1949, Yasui was appointed professor. She retired in 1952, becoming a professor emerita. By 1957 she had published a total of 99 scientific papers.

== Legacy ==
Kono Yasui accomplished a lot of firsts during her life and career as a biologist and cytologist. Her career lasted from the late Meiji period, through the Taisho (1912-1926), to the early Showa period (1926-1989). During this time, women were strongly oppressed in Japan and were all but outlawed from working in research and academia. She was the first Japanese woman to publish an academic paper in an international journal. Most notably, she was the first Japanese woman to receive a doctoral degree in science, and she did so at a university that did not accept female students until almost 20 years later. During her time as a teacher at Tokyo Women’s Higher Normal School, she was very strict and did not treat her students as “girls.” Outside of the laboratory and classroom, however, she was known to be kind to her juniors and students alike. She heavily valued and contributed to the advancement of women’s education in Japan. After World War II, Yasui worked to establish a national university for women. These efforts were successful, as she played a pivotal role in the transformation of Tokyo Women’s Higher Normal School to Ochanomizu University in 1949. She also donated the money received as gifts for her retirement to the Tokyo Women’s Higher Normal School as the “Yasui-Kuroda Scholarship,” which continues to provide educational opportunities for young female researchers today. Kono Yasui’s life has served as a guide and shining example to a whole generation of young women scientists.

== Timeline ==
(1880) February 16, Born in Kagawa Prefecture

(1898) Graduates from Kagawa Prefecture Normal School (age 18)

(1902) Graduates from Women’s Higher Normal School Division of Science (age 22)

(1905) Published first paper, “Weber’s Organ of Carp Fish,” in the Journal “Zoological Science.”

(1907) Completes graduate work at Women’s Higher Normal School, becomes assistant professor there (age 27)

(1914) Began studying cytology at the University of Chicago

(1915) Began studying coal at Harvard University

(1927) Published doctoral thesis, becoming first Japanese woman to receive doctorate (age 47)

(1929) Started the cytology journal, “Cytologia”

(1949) Becomes professor at Ochanomizu University (age 69)

(1952) Retires and becomes professor emeritus at Ochanomizu University (age 72)

(1955) Receives a Medal with Purple Ribbon for her academic accomplishments (age 75)

(1965) Receives the Order of the Precious Crown, Third Class (age 85)

(1971) March 24, passes away at her home in Tokyo (age 91)

== See also ==
- Timeline of women in science
