= 2002–03 Kategoria e Dytë =

Kategoria e Dytë
- Season: 2002–03
- Champions: Egnatia
- Promoted: None
- Relegated: 24 clubs to Second Division; 11 clubs to Third Division

The 2002–03 Kategoria e Dytë was the 56th season of a second-tier association football league in Albania.

== Group B1 (North) ==
Pos	Team	Pld	W	D	L	GF	GA	GD	Pts	Relegation
1	Laçi	20	14	3	3	48	18	+30	45	
2	Veleçiku	20	14	2	4	40	19	+21	44	
3	Dajti (R)	20	13	2	5	38	14	+24	41	Relegation to 2003–04 Kategoria e Dytë
4	Iliria (R)	20	9	4	7	36	24	+12	31	Relegation to 2003–04 Kategoria e Dytë
5	Kastrioti (R)	20	7	6	7	21	25	−4	27	Relegation to 2003–04 Kategoria e Dytë
6	Përparimi (R)	20	8	3	9	19	23	−4	27	Relegation to 2003–04 Kategoria e Dytë
7	Ada (R)	20	7	4	9	28	25	+3	25	Relegation to 2003–04 Kategoria e Dytë
8	Burreli (R)	20	6	6	8	32	30	+2	24	Relegation to 2003–04 Kategoria e Dytë
9	Albania FK (R)	20	6	5	9	20	28	−8	23	Relegation to 2003–04 Kategoria e Tretë
10	Korabi (R)	20	6	4	10	31	34	−3	22	Relegation to 2003–04 Kategoria e Tretë
11	Minatori (Rr) (R)	20	0	1	19	13	86	−73	1	Relegation to 2003–04 Kategoria e Tretë

(R) Relegated
- Shkodra was apparently excluded for financial reasons

== Group B2 (Centre-East/East) ==
Pos	Team	Pld	W	D	L	GF	GA	GD	Pts	Relegation
1	Tomori	22	18	1	3	63	19	+44	55	
2	Naftëtari	22	17	3	2	61	13	+48	54	
3	Pogradeci (R)	22	17	3	2	65	14	+51	54	Relegation to 2003–04 Kategoria e Dytë
4	Skënderbeu (R)	22	12	5	5	59	28	+31	41	Relegation to 2003–04 Kategoria e Dytë
5	Sopoti (R)	22	11	4	7	52	33	+19	37	Relegation to 2003–04 Kategoria e Dytë
6	Devolli (R)	22	9	5	8	34	39	−5	32	Relegation to 2003–04 Kategoria e Dytë
7	Cërriku (R)	22	8	2	12	33	36	−3	26	Relegation to 2003–04 Kategoria e Dytë
8	Gramozi (R)	22	8	2	12	34	48	−14	26	Relegation to 2003–04 Kategoria e Dytë
9	Maliqi (R)	22	7	3	12	28	40	−12	24	Relegation to 2003–04 Kategoria e Tretë
10	Gramshi (R)	22	4	3	15	32	59	−27	15	Relegation to 2003–04 Kategoria e Tretë
11	Domozdova (R)	22	3	3	16	19	59	−40	12	Relegation to 2003–04 Kategoria e Tretë
12	Melesini (R)	22	0	2	20	10	102	−92	2	Relegation to 2003–04 Kategoria e Tretë

(R) Relegated

=== 2nd place playoff ===
- Played in Durrës on 29 May 2003.

Team 1	Score	Team 2
Naftëtari	2–1	Pogradeci

== Group B3 (Centre-West/South) ==
Pos	Team	Pld	W	D	L	GF	GA	GD	Pts	Relegation
1	Egnatia	22	17	1	4	66	13	+53	52	
2	Luftëtari	22	16	3	3	51	22	+29	51	
3	Albpetrol (R)	22	14	4	4	44	20	+24	46	Relegation to 2003–04 Kategoria e Dytë
4	Delvina (R)	22	11	4	7	33	28	+5	37	Relegation to 2003–04 Kategoria e Dytë
5	Minatori (M) (R)	22	9	7	6	35	26	+9	34	Relegation to 2003–04 Kategoria e Dytë
6	Minatori (T) (R)	22	9	5	8	42	26	+16	32	Relegation to 2003–04 Kategoria e Dytë
7	Përmeti (R)	22	7	5	10	28	38	−10	26	Relegation to 2003–04 Kategoria e Dytë
8	Çlirimi (R)	22	7	3	12	36	41	−5	24	Relegation to 2003–04 Kategoria e Dytë
9	Butrinti (R)	22	4	8	10	26	40	−14	20	Relegation to 2003–04 Kategoria e Tretë
10	Poliçani (R)	22	5	5	12	21	54	−33	20	Relegation to 2003–04 Kategoria e Tretë
11	Këlcyra (R)	22	4	5	13	22	49	−27	17	Relegation to 2003–04 Kategoria e Tretë
12	Skrapari (R)	22	3	2	17	16	63	−47	11	Relegation to 2003–04 Kategoria e Tretë

(R) Relegated

== Championship playoff ==
Pos	Team	Pld	W	D	L	GF	GA	GD	Pts
1	Egnatia (C)	2	1	1	0	3	1	+2	4
2	Tomori	2	1	1	0	2	1	+1	4
3	Laçi	2	0	0	2	0	3	−3	0

(C) Champions

Team 1	Score	Team 2
Tomori	1–0 (5–4 p)	Laçi
Egnatia	1–1 (3–4 p)	Tomori
Laçi	0–2	Egnatia

Note: Originally, first tie-breaker is goal difference, second penalty shoot-outs won; however, the Albanian Football Association was decided to have another play-off match instead.

=== Final ===
8 June 2003

Egnatia	2–1	Tomori
Rexha 37', 41'		Mile 68'

Tirana
