= Kristaq Mile =

Albanian football player and coach

Personal information
- Full name: Kristaq Mile
- Date of birth: 29 April 1958 (age 68)
- Place of birth: Berat, Albania
- Position: Midfielder

Senior career*
Years	Team	Apps	(Gls)
1977–1988	Tomori Berat		
1988–1989	Skrapari		

International career
1985	Albania	1	(0)

Managerial career
- 1993–1997: Tomori
- 2000–2002: Tomori
- 2002–2003: Lushnja
- 2003–2004: Bylis
- 2005–2007: Tomori
- 2007–2008: Teuta
- 2008–2009: Tomori
- 2009: Shkumbini
- 2011–2012: Shkumbini
- 2012: Tomori
- 2012–2013: Shkumbini
- 2013–2014: Kastrioti
- 2015: Tomori
- 2015–2016: Shkumbini
- 2016–2017: Naftëtari
- * Club domestic league appearances and goals

Kristaq Mile (born 29 April 1958) is a former Albanian football player who is now a coach. He is also a coach.

== Playing career ==
=== Club ===
Mile played his entire career for hometown club Tomori Berat, only to finish his career at Skrapari.

=== International ===
He made his debut for Albania in a May 1985 FIFA World Cup qualification match against Poland, coming on as a second-half substitute for Shkëlqim Muça. It remained his sole international appearance.

== Managerial career ==
In March 2011 he replaced Përparim Daiu at the helm of Shkumbini, in November 2012 he succeeded Gugash Magani as coach of Shkumbini and in November 2013 he was appointed manager at Kastrioti. He was in charge of Naftëtari Kuçovë in the 2016–17 season.

== Personal life ==
Mile's son Vangjel was a professional footballer who had spells in Finland and Norway.
