= Portuguese expedition to the Moluccas =

Portuguese Expedition to the Moluccas
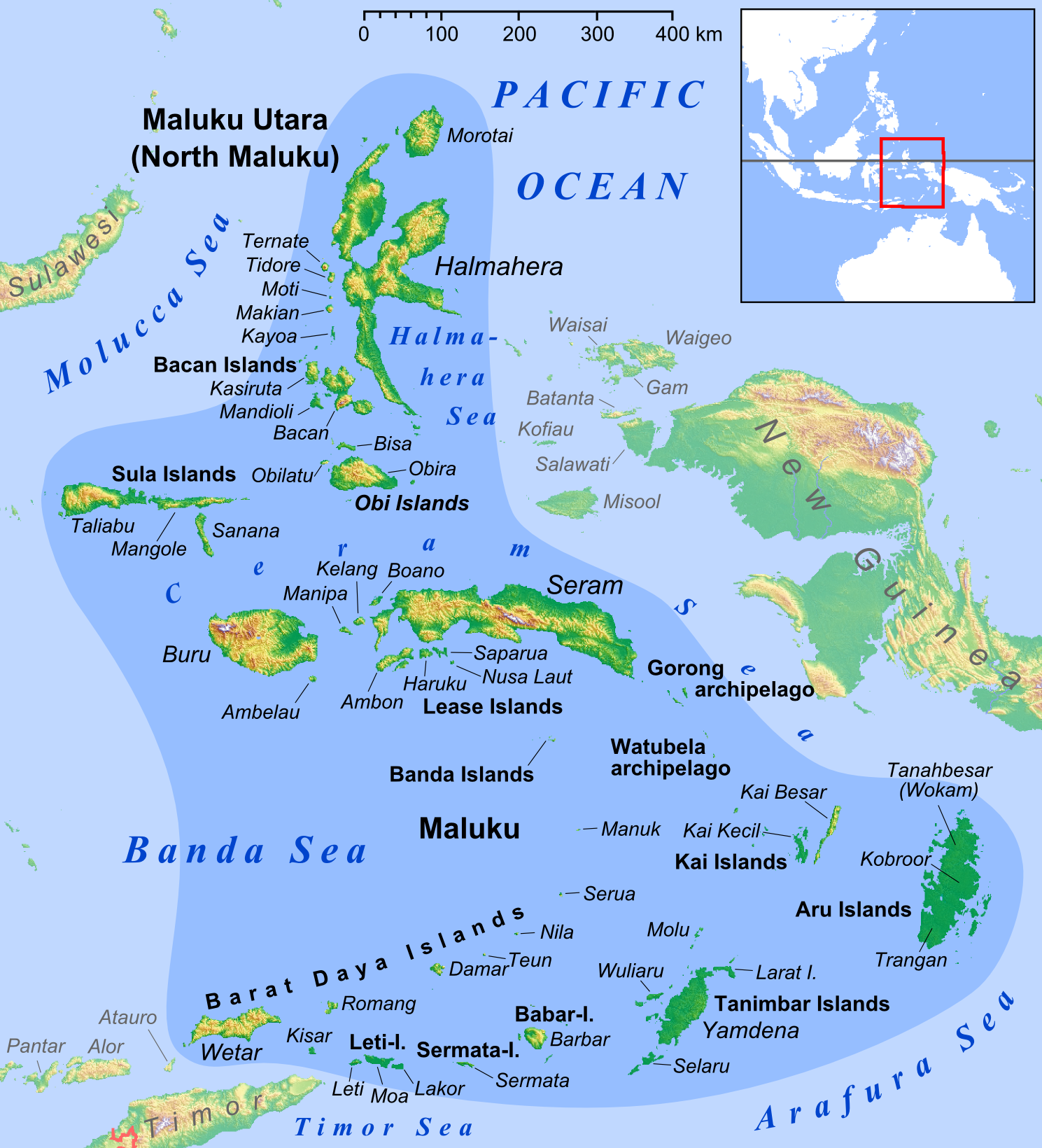
- Moluccas Islands
- Country: Kingdom of Portugal
- Leader: António de Abreu
- Start: November 1511
- End: December 1512
- Goal: Discover the Spice Islands (Banda Islands and Moluccas)
- Ships: Santa Catarina; Sabaia; Unnamed caravel
- Crew: 120 Portuguese sailors, 60 slaves and 2 native pilots
- Survivors: 80 Portuguese sailors
- Achievements: First Portuguese mapping of the Spice Islands; Portuguese contact with the Banda Islands; Establishment of new trade routes in Indonesia

The Portuguese expedition to the Moluccas was a 1511-1512 voyage led by Portuguese explorer António de Abreu following the conquest of Malacca. The expedition aimed to discover and establish direct trade with the Spice Islands.

== Background ==
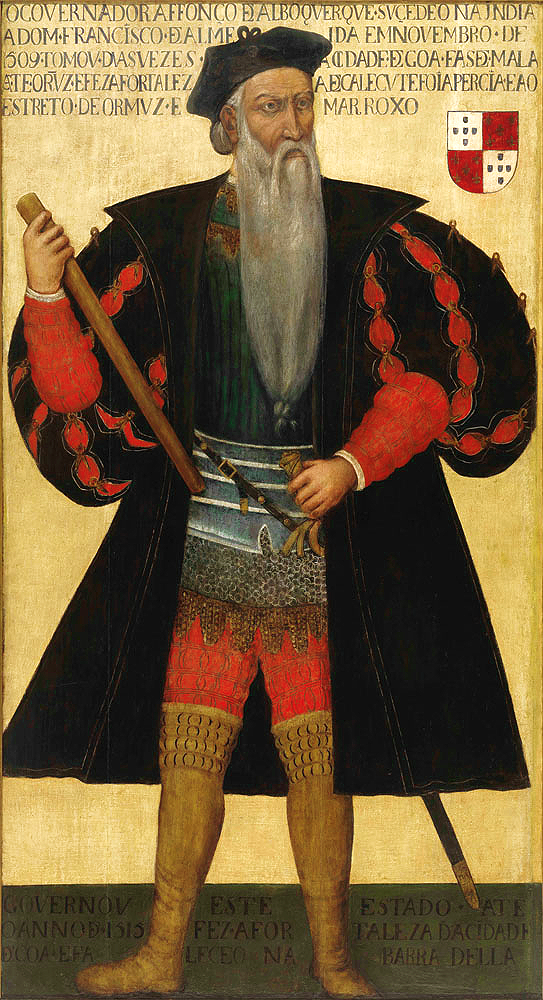
Afonso de Albuquerque

After the Portuguese conquest of Malacca in August 1511, Afonso de Albuquerque sought to expand Portugal's influence further into Southeast Asia. The primary goal was to establish a maritime route to the Spice Islands known today as the Banda Islands and the Moluccas.

To achieve this, Albuquerque dispatched an expedition to the Spice Islands, assigning António de Abreu as its commander.

== Expedition ==
The expedition departed from Malacca in November 1511 with a fleet of three ships. The flagship, Santa Catarina, was commanded by António de Abreu, with Luís Botim serving as pilot. Francisco Serrão captained the Sabaia, supported by pilot Gonçalo de Oliveira, while the third vessel, a caravel, was under Simão Afonso Bisagudo, with Francisco Rodrigues as pilot. The fleet carried 120 Portuguese sailors, 60 slaves and 2 native pilots.

From Malacca, the fleet navigated the Strait of Malacca and travelled along the northern coast of Java. They stopped at Grissee (modern-day Gresik) in Java for supplies and navigation adjustments. However, Francisco Serrão's ship, the Sabaia, was wrecked off Sapudi Island near eastern Java. Despite this setback, the fleet continued its eastward journey.

Upon reaching the Banda Islands, the Portuguese established their first direct contact with the Spice Islands. They successfully acquired a cargo of valuable spices, including nutmeg and mace. Francisco Rodrigues, a cartographer, documented the voyage by representing it in maps, with sketches of the islands.

The return voyage was however dangerous. Serrão's junk had to replace the wrecked Sabaia, but was shipwrecked near the Lucipara Islands during a storm. Serrão and nine surviving crew members were rescued by local rulers in the Moluccas, where they remained for several years. Meanwhile, the two remaining ships continued their journey and returned to Malacca in December 1512, one year after their departure. Of the 120 sailors who initially embarked, only 80 returned, with 10 remaining there and 30 that died during the voyage.
