= Skaro Reef =

Reef in Indonesia

Coordinates: 5°34′42″S 127°28′10″E

Skaro Reef, also known as William Reef or Karang Skaro, is a reef in the Banda Sea. Due to its close proximity to the Lucipara Islands, it is a part of Indonesia. It is a part of the Maluku province. The area is not populated. Parts of it are above sea level.

Skaro Reef on a map of Indonesia.
