= Arben Arbëri =

Albanian footballer

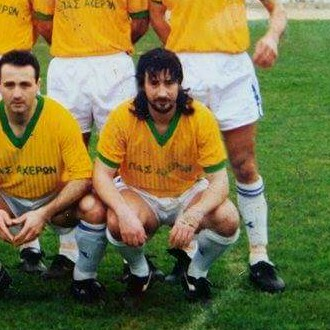

Personal information
- Full name: Arben Arbëri
- Date of birth: 6 January 1964 (age 62)
- Place of birth: Albania
- Position: Striker

Senior career*
Years	Team	Apps	(Gls)
1985–1990	Tomori Berat		
1990–1991	PAS Giannina	1	(0)

International career
1989–1990	Albania	3	(0)

Managerial career
- 2010–2014: Tomori Berat U-19
- * Club domestic league appearances and goals

Arben Arbëri (born 6 January 1964) is an Albanian retired football player who is known for winning the Albanian Golden Boot for being the top goalscorer of the 1986-87 Albanian Superliga with 14 goals.

== Club career ==
Arbëri played primarily as a striker for Tomori Berat in Albania and PAS Giannina in Greece.

== International career ==
He made his debut for Albania in an October 1989 FIFA World Cup qualification match away at Sweden and earned a total of 3 caps, scoring no goals. His final international was a May 1990 European Championship qualification match against Iceland.

== Personal life ==
His older brother Theodhor Arbëri was also a footballer who played for Tomori Berat during the 1980s and his younger brother Klodian have also played for Tomori Berat amongst other teams in Albania, while he also briefly played in Slovenia with NK Maribor. His nephews Gersi and Polizoi are also footballers who currently play for Tomori Berat and Flamurtari Vlorë respectively.

== Honours ==
Individual

- Albanian Superliga top scorer: 1986–87
- Albanian First Division top scorer: 1987–88
