= Penyu Islands =

- Interactive map of Penyu Islands

Geography
- Location: Banda Sea
- Coordinates: 5°23′56.4″S 127°47′20.7″E
- Adjacent to: Seram Sea

Administration
- Indonesia
- Province: Maluku
- Regency: Southwest Maluku Regency
- District: Damer

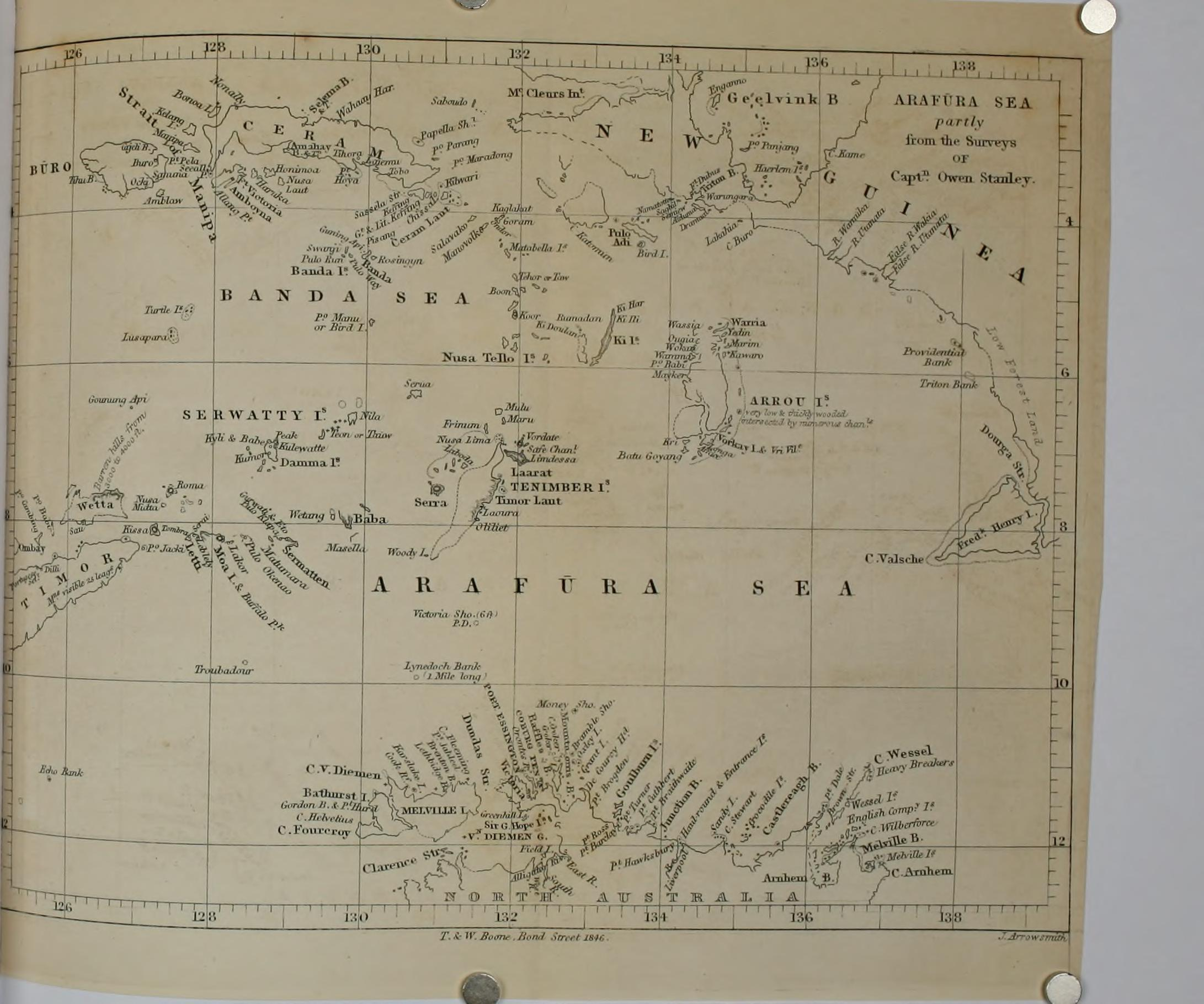

Penyu Islands is part of Molucca Islands, located at the south of Strait of Manipa near Ceram. To the west is Lucipara Islands, to the east is Banda Islands and the south Barat Daya Islands.

The Penyu Islands on a map of Indonesia.

== Islands ==
The Penyu Islands are an archipelago that consists of three main islands:

- Pulau Kadola
- Pulau Bingkud
- Mai Island
