= Chinonso Onuh =

Nigerian association football player

Personal information
- Full name: Chinonso Darlington Onuh
- Date of birth: 2 May 1992 (age 34)
- Place of birth: Lagos, Nigeria
- Height: 1.82 m (5 ft 11 1/2 in)
- Position: Forward

Team information
- Current team: Shkumbini
- Number: 99

Senior career*
Years	Team	Apps	(Gls)
–2013	36 Lion		
2016–2017	Burreli	20	(7)
2017–2018	Tomori Berat	12	(5)
2018–2020	Besa Kavajë	46	(15)
2021–	Shkumbini	2	(0)
- * Club domestic league appearances and goals as of 19:48, 21 September 2021 (UTC)

Chinonso Darlington Onuh (born 2 May 1992) is a Nigerian footballer who currently plays as a forward for KF Shkumbini.

== Career statistics ==
=== Club ===
As of 8 December 2018.

Club	Season	League			Cup		Continental		Other		Total	
Club	Season	Division	Apps	Goals	Apps	Goals	Apps	Goals	Apps	Goals	Apps	Goals
Burreli	2016–17	Albanian First Division	20	7	0	0	–		0	0	20	7
Tomori Berat	2017–18	Albanian First Division	12	5	0	0	–		0	0	12	5
FK Egnatia	2017–18	Albanian First Division	12	1	1 (Note: Appearances in the Albanian Cup)	1	–		0	0	13	2
FK Egnatia	2018–19	Albanian First Division	7	0	0	0	–		0	0	7	0
Career total			51	13	1	1	0	0	0	0	52	14
