= 2007–08 Kategoria e Parë =

Kategoria e Parë
- Season: 2007–08
- Champions: Bylis
- Promoted: Bylis; Apolonia; Lushnja
- Relegated: Erzeni; Tomori; Gramshi; Tepelena

The 2007–08 Kategoria e Parë was the 61st season of a second-tier association football league in Albania.

== League table ==
| Pos | Team | Pld | W | D | L | GF | GA | GD | Pts | Promotion or relegation |
|---|---|---|---|---|---|---|---|---|---|---|
| 1 | Bylis (C, P) | 34 | 23 | 5 | 6 | 70 | 20 | +50 | 74 | Promotion to 2008–09 Kategoria Superiore |
| 2 | Apolonia (P) | 34 | 23 | 4 | 7 | 70 | 23 | +47 | 73 | Promotion to 2008–09 Kategoria Superiore |
| 3 | Lushnja (P) | 34 | 22 | 7 | 5 | 57 | 26 | +31 | 73 | Play-off promotion to 2008–09 Kategoria Superiore |
| 4 | Burreli | 34 | 21 | 4 | 9 | 51 | 26 | +25 | 67 | Play-off promotion to 2008–09 Kategoria Superiore |
| 5 | Laçi | 34 | 19 | 9 | 6 | 57 | 29 | +28 | 66 | |
| 6 | Ada | 34 | 17 | 6 | 11 | 50 | 37 | +13 | 57 | |
| 7 | Luftëtari | 34 | 14 | 6 | 14 | 48 | 43 | +5 | 48 | |
| 8 | Skrapari | 34 | 15 | 3 | 16 | 39 | 39 | 0 | 48 | |
| 9 | Kamza | 34 | 12 | 8 | 14 | 37 | 29 | +8 | 44 | |
| 10 | Turbina | 34 | 14 | 2 | 18 | 34 | 48 | −14 | 44 | |
| 11 | Pogradeci | 34 | 12 | 7 | 15 | 33 | 33 | 0 | 43 | |
| 12 | Bilisht Sport | 34 | 13 | 4 | 17 | 37 | 48 | −11 | 43 | |
| 13 | Sopoti | 34 | 13 | 4 | 17 | 30 | 42 | −12 | 43 | |
| 14 | Naftëtari | 34 | 12 | 4 | 18 | 36 | 51 | −15 | 40 | |
| 15 | Erzeni (R) | 34 | 11 | 6 | 17 | 29 | 42 | −13 | 39 | Relegation to 2008–09 Kategoria e Dytë |
| 16 | Tomori (R) | 34 | 8 | 7 | 19 | 29 | 56 | −27 | 31 | Relegation to 2008–09 Kategoria e Dytë |
| 17 | Gramshi (R) | 34 | 9 | 2 | 23 | 28 | 58 | −30 | 29 | Relegation to 2008–09 Kategoria e Dytë |
| 18 | Tepelena (R) | 34 | 2 | 4 | 28 | 23 | 108 | −85 | 10 | Relegation to 2008–09 Kategoria e Dytë |

Source: Soccerway
Rules for classification: 1) points; 2) goal difference; 3) number of goals scored; 4) head-to-head points; 5) head-to-head goal difference; 6) draw. (Head-to-head record is applied for clubs with the same number of points only once all matches between said clubs have been played.)
(C) Champions; (P) Promoted; (R) Relegated

== Promotion playoffs ==
24 May 2008
15:00

| Burreli | 1–2 (a.e.t.) | Teuta |
|---|---|---|
| Xhixha 90' | Report | Dushku 7'; Hodo 114' (pen.) |

Qemal Stafa Stadium, Tirana
25 May 2008
15:00

| Kastrioti | 0–0 (a.e.t.) | Lushnja |
|---|---|---|
| | Report |
Penalties
| | 2–4 |

Qemal Stafa Stadium, Tirana
