= Erald Hyseni =

Albanian footballer (born 1999)

Personal information
- Date of birth: 12 November 1999 (age 26)
- Place of birth: Berat, Albania
- Height: 1.83 m (6 ft 0 in)
- Position: Midfielder

Team information
- Current team: Tomori Berat
- Number: 10

Youth career
- –2016: Tomori Berat

Senior career*
Years	Team	Apps	(Gls)
2016–2018	Tomori Berat	23	(4)
2018–2020	Luftëtari	40	(0)
2020–2021	Tomori Berat	7	(0)
2021–2022	Besa Kavajë	34	(4)
2022–2023	Egnatia	1	(0)
2023	Skënderbeu	4	(0)
2023–	Tomori Berat	23	(0)
- * Club domestic league appearances and goals as of 1 June 2024

Erald Hyseni (born 12 November 1999) is an Albanian footballer who plays as a midfielder for Tomori Berat in the Kategoria e Parë.

== Career ==
=== Tomori Berat ===
A graduate of the club's youth academy, Hyseni made his competitive debut for the club on 28 September 2016, coming on as a halftime substitute for Xhuljano Serdari in a 3-0 Cup defeat to Kukësi. He made his league debut for the club later that season, replacing Aldrit Oshafi in a 2–0 away defeat to Bylis in March 2017.
