= Aldrit Oshafi =

Albanian footballer

Personal information
- Date of birth: 26 March 2000 (age 26)
- Place of birth: Berat, Albania
- Height: 1.95 m (6 ft 5 in)
- Position: Forward

Team information
- Current team: Pogoń Grodzisk Mazowiecki
- Number: 20

Youth career
- 2011–2017: Tomori Berat

Senior career*
Years	Team	Apps	(Gls)
2015–2017	Tomori	11	(2)
2017–2018	Besa Kavajë	16	(2)
2018–2020	Luftëtari	33	(1)
2020–2023	Teuta	21	(1)
2021–2022	→ Tomori (loan)	39	(20)
2023–2024	Malisheva	13	(2)
2024	Tomori	15	(3)
2024–2026	Flamurtari	62	(18)
2026–	Pogoń Grodzisk Mazowiecki	0	(0)

International career
2016	Albania U17	5	(0)
2018	Albania U19	3	(0)
2019	Albania U20	2	(0)
- * Club domestic league appearances and goals as of 18:15, 5 July 2026 (UTC)

Aldrit Oshafi (born 26 March 2000) is an Albanian professional footballer who plays as a forward for I liga club Pogoń Grodzisk Mazowiecki.

== Club career ==
Oshafi made his professional debut for Tomori on 28 September 2016 in a 3–0 defeat against FK Kukësi. On 26 October 2016, he was called up to the Albania U-17 squad in a 1–0 defeat against Italy. He scored his first goal for Tomori on 29 April 2017 against Shkumbini Peqin. In summer 2018, he moved to Luftëtari Gjirokastër.

== Career statistics ==
As of match played 10 May 2026

Appearances and goals by club, season and competition
Club	Season	League			National cup (Note: Includes Albanian Cup)		Europe		Other		Total	
Club	Season	Division	Apps	Goals	Apps	Goals	Apps	Goals	Apps	Goals	Apps	Goals
Tomori Berat	2015–16	Albanian Second Division	3	1	—		—		—		3	1
Tomori Berat	2016–17	Albanian First Division	8	1	2	0	—		—		10	1
Tomori Berat	Total		11	2	2	0	—		—		13	2
Besa Kavajë	2017–18	Albanian First Division	16	2	0	0	—		—		16	2
Luftëtari	2018–19	Kategoria Superiore	10	0	1	1	—		—		11	1
Luftëtari	2019–20	Kategoria Superiore	23	1	0	0	—		—		23	1
Luftëtari	Total		33	1	1	1	—		—		34	2
Teuta	2020–21	Kategoria Superiore	0	0	0	0	0	0	0	0	0	0
Teuta	2022–23	Kategoria Superiore	21	1	2	0	—		—		23	1
Teuta	Total		21	1	2	0	0	0	0	0	23	1
Tomori Berat (loan)	2020–21	Kategoria e Parë	12	5	0	0	—		1 (Note: Appearance in Kategoria e Parë promotion play-offs)	0	13	5
Tomori Berat (loan)	2021–22	Kategoria e Parë	27	15	1	1	—		1	0	29	15
Tomori Berat (loan)	Total		39	20	1	1	—		2	0	42	20
Malisheva	2023–24	Superleague of Kosovo	13	2	0	0	—		—		13	2
Tomori Berat	2023–24	Kategoria e Parë	15	3	0	0	—		—		15	3
Flamurtari	2024–25	Kategoria e Parë	31	16	1	2	—		—		32	18
Flamurtari	2025–26	Kategoria Superiore	31	2	3	4	—		—		34	6
Flamurtari	Total		62	18	4	6	—		—		66	24
Pogoń Grodzisk Mazowiecki	2026–27	I liga	0	0	0	0	—		—		0	0
Career total			210	49	10	0	0	0	2	0	222	56
