= 1986–87 Albanian National Championship =

Albanian National Championship
- Season: 1986–87
- Champions: Partizani; 14th Albanian title
- Relegated: Naftëtari; Traktori
- European Cup: Partizani
- UEFA Cup: Flamurtari
- Cup Winners' Cup: Vllaznia
- Matches: 182
- Goals: 393 (2.16 per match)
- Top goalscorer: Arben Arbëri (14 goals)

The 1986–87 Albanian National Championship was the 48th season of the Albanian National Championship, the top professional league for association football clubs, since its establishment in 1930.

== Overview ==
It was contested by 14 teams, and Partizani won the championship.

== League table ==
Pos	Team	Pld	W	D	L	GF	GA	GD	Pts	Qualification or relegation
1	Partizani (C)	26	15	6	5	43	18	+25	36	Qualification for the European Cup first round
2	Flamurtari (Note: Flamurtari, Dinamo Tirana and 17 Nëntori were deducted three points.)	26	14	8	4	40	21	+19	33	Qualification for the UEFA Cup first round
3	Vllaznia	26	12	8	6	31	22	+9	32	Qualification for the Cup Winners' Cup first round
4	Dinamo Tirana	26	13	8	5	36	23	+13	31	
5	Luftëtari	26	9	8	9	26	24	+2	26	
6	17 Nëntori	26	9	10	7	43	29	+14	25	
7	Apolonia (Note: Apolonia were deducted six points.)	26	7	15	4	24	27	−3	23	
8	Labinoti	26	7	9	10	24	28	−4	23	
9	Lokomotiva Durrës	26	6	10	10	22	30	−8	22	
10	Besa	26	4	14	8	21	31	−10	22	
11	Tomori	26	6	10	10	28	39	−11	22	
12	Skënderbeu	26	6	9	11	25	28	−3	21	
13	Naftëtari (R)	26	7	7	12	17	32	−15	21	Relegation to the 1987–88 Kategoria e Dytë
14	Traktori (R)	26	4	4	18	13	41	−28	12	Relegation to the 1987–88 Kategoria e Dytë

Source: RSSSF.org
(C) Champions; (R) Relegated
Notes:

Note: '17 Nëntori' is Tirana, 'Labinoti' is Elbasani, 'Lokomotiva Durrës' is Teuta, 'Traktori' is Lushnja

== Results ==
Home \ Away	17N	APO	BES	DIN	FLA	LAB	LOK	LUF	NAF	PAR	SKË	TOM	TRA	VLL
17 Nëntori		4–0	1–0	3–4	0–1	2–1	2–1	1–2	6–0	1–1	3–0	5–0	1–0	2–1
Apolonia	1–1		1–1	0–0	0–0	2–1	1–0	2–1	0–0	1–4	2–1	2–0	1–1	2–3
Besa	2–2	0–1		0–1	0–0	1–1	1–2	0–0	1–1	1–0	1–0	0–0	2–1	1–1
Dinamo	3–2	0–0	2–1		0–1	1–0	2–2	1–0	1–1	1–3	3–1	1–0	6–0	1–0
Flamurtari	2–1	2–0	1–1	0–1		2–2	2–0	2–1	2–1	3–1	3–1	4–1	4–0	2–1
Labinoti	1–0	1–1	1–1	0–1	1–0		2–1	1–0	2–0	0–1	1–0	1–1	2–0	0–1
Lokomotiva	4–1	0–0	0–0	1–1	1–1	3–1		0–4	2–1	1–0	1–1	1–1	1–0	0–1
Luftëtari	1–1	1–1	0–0	0–0	2–2	1–0	2–1		1–0	1–1	1–1	2–0	1–0	1–0
Naftëtari	1–1	0–0	1–1	1–0	0–1	0–0	2–0	2–1		1–0	0–1	2–0	1–0	1–0
Partizani	0–0	1–1	1–1	1–0	1–0	4–2	3–0	3–0	4–1		2–0	6–1	2–1	2–0
Skënderbeu	1–1	2–2	4–0	1–1	1–1	2–0	0–0	0–1	3–0	0–1		1–0	2–1	0–0
Tomori	0–0	2–2	5–1	2–2	2–1	1–1	0–0	1–0	1–0	0–1	2–2		5–1	1–1
Traktori	0–0	0–1	1–3	0–2	0–1	1–1	1–0	2–1	2–0	0–0	1–0	0–1		0–1
Vllaznia	2–2	0–0	3–1	3–1	2–2	1–1	0–0	2–1	2–0	1–0	1–0	2–1	2–0	

Source: CalcioMondialeWeb.it
Legend: Blue = home team win; Yellow = draw; Red = away team win.

== Season statistics ==
=== Top scorers ===
Rank	Player	Club	Goals
1	(Albania) Arben Arbëri	Tomori	14
2	(Albania) Agustin Kola	17 Nëntori	13
3	(Albania) Kujtim Majaci	Apolonia	11
3	(Albania) Arben Minga	17 Nëntori	11
5	(Albania) Ylli Shehu	Partizani	11
