= Theodhor Arbëri =

Albanian footballer

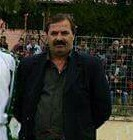
- Arbëri is the manager

Personal information
- Date of birth: 3 March 1953 (age 73)
- Place of birth: Berat, Albania
- Position: Striker

Youth career
- Tomori U16
- Tomori U19

Senior career*
Years	Team	Apps	(Gls)
1974–1978	Shkëndija		
1978–1992	Tomori Berat	428	

Managerial career
- 1993–1995: Tomori Berat U-17
- 1995–1997: Tomori Berat U-19
- 1998–2000: Tomori Berat
- 2014–: Tomori Berat U-12
- * Club domestic league appearances and goals

Theodhor "Dhori" Arbëri (born 3 March 1953) is a former FK Tomori Berat football player, he played for more than a decade in his home city Berat.

== Personal life ==
He is the older brother of Arben Arbëri and Klodian Arbëri, also FK Tomori Berat former football players. His son is Polizoi Arbëri, who has played for Albania national under-21 football team. Gersi Arbëri, his older son is now the coach of FK Tomori Berat.

Theodhor Arbëri is since 2014 coach of Tomori U12.
