= Ilirjan File =

Albanian football coach

Personal information
- Full name: Ilirjan File
- Date of birth: 31 October 1969 (age 57)
- Place of birth: Elbasan, Albania

Managerial career
- Years: Team
- 2007: Elbasani
- 2011–2014: Elbasani
- 2015: Shkumbini

File, Ilirjan (born 31 October 1969 in Elbasan) is an Albanian football coach who has been the manager of KF Elbasani twice in the Albanian Superliga.
