= Klodian Arbëri =

Albanian footballer

Personal information
- Date of birth: 23 April 1979 (age 47)
- Place of birth: Berat, PSR Albania
- Position: Forward

Senior career*
| Years | Team | Apps | (Gls) |
| 1996–2000 | Tomori Berat | 98 | (33) |
| 2000–2001 | Maribor | 3 | (0) |
| 2001–2002 | Tomori Berat | 26 | (8) |
| 2002–2003 | Vllaznia | 11 | (4) |
| 2003–2005 | Lushnja | 31 | (11) |
| 2005–2006 | Skënderbeu | 30 | (6) |
| 2006–2007 | Dinamo Tirana | 10 | (1) |
| 2007–2010 | Lushnja | 38 | (7) |
| 2010–2012 | Tomori Berat | 25 | (5) |
| 2012–2013 | Bylis | 25 | (2) |
| 2013–2014 | Luftëtari FC | | |
| 2014 | Lushnja | | |
| 2014–2015 | Tomori | | |

Managerial career
- 2022–2023: Tomori
- 2023–2024: Vora
- 2025: Voska Sport
- * Club domestic league appearances and goals

Klodian Arbëri (born 23 April 1979) is an Albanian retired footballer who played as a forward.

== Club career ==
Forward had several stints with KS Tomori Berat in the Albanian Superliga.

Arbëri previously played for NK Maribor in the Slovenian PrvaLiga.

== Personal life ==
He is the brother of Theodhor Arbëri and Arben Arbëri.
