= Tomori =

Tomori (Japanese: 友利/燈) is both a surname and a given name. Notable people with the name include:

== Surname ==
- Ede Tomori (1920–1997), Hungarian photographer
- Fikayo Tomori (born 1997), English footballer
- Katsuyoshi Tomori (友利 勝良; born 1954), Japanese golfer
- Kiichi Tomori (友利 貴一; born 1991), Japanese footballer
- Oyewale Tomori (born 1946), Nigerian virologist
- Pál Tomori (c. 1475 – 1526), Hungarian Roman Catholic monk and archbishop
- Tadashi Tomori (友利 正; born 1959), Japanese boxer
- Yui Tomori (友利 結; born 1967), Japanese baseball player
- Zsuzsanna Tomori (born 1987), Hungarian handball player

== Given name ==
- Tomori Kusunoki (楠木 ともり; born 1999), Japanese voice actress
- Tomori Nagamoto (永本 冬森; born 1973), Japanese-Canadian artist

== Fictional characters ==
- Tomori Takamatsu (高松 燈), a fictional character and the vocalist of the alternative rock band MyGO!!!!! in the musical media franchise BanG Dream! and the BanG Dream! spin-off anime series BanG Dream! It's MyGO!!!!!

== Others ==
- Kingdom of Mori (also known as Tomori), a small polity in modern Indonesia
