= Ardi Qejvani =

Albanian footballer

Personal information
- Full name: Ardi Qejvani
- Date of birth: 28 January 1993 (age 33)
- Place of birth: Vlorë, Albania
- Position: Left midfielder

Team information
- Current team: Oriku
- Number: 15

Youth career
- Flamurtari Vlorë

Senior career*
Years	Team	Apps	(Gls)
2012–2016	Flamurtari	22	(1)
2012–2013	→ Himara (loan)	14	(0)
2014	→ Luftëtari (loan)	12	(0)
2016	→ Butrinti (loan)	11	(0)
2016–2017	Sopoti	15	(1)
2017–	Oriku		
- * Club domestic league appearances and goals as of 22:07, 7 August 2021 (UTC)

Ardi Qejvani (born 28 January 1993) is an Albanian football player who currently plays as a midfielder for Oriku in the Albanian First Division.
