= Saimir Dauti =

Albanian footballer and coach

Personal information
- Date of birth: 1943 or 1944
- Place of birth: Tirana, Albania
- Position: Striker

Senior career*
Years	Team	Apps	(Gls)
1960–197x	Dinamo Tirana		

Managerial career
- 197x–198x: Dinamo Tirana
- 2000–2001: Tomori
- * Club domestic league appearances and goals

Saimir Dauti (born 1943 or 1944) is an Albanian former football player and coach who spent his entire career at Dinamo Tirana and even managed the side in the late 1970s and early 1980s.

== Club career ==
When with Dinamo, Dauti topped Albania's goalscoring charts in 1966 with 13 goals.

== Personal life ==
His brother Lulzim was also a professional footballer in the 60s and 70s with Partizani Tirana. During his time as a football player and coach he was commonly referred to as Sallake.

Since around 2007 he has been working for the Albanian Football Association, sitting as a member of the appeals board of the disciplinary commission.

== Honours ==
- Albanian Superliga: 1

1967
