= Përparim Daiu =

Albanian footballer and coach

Personal information
- Full name: Përparim Daiu
- Date of birth: 21 April 1970 (age 56)
- Place of birth: Kavajë, Albania
- Position: Defender

Senior career*
| Years | Team | Apps | (Gls) |
| 1990–1998 | Besa | | |
| 1999 | Teuta | 10 | (0) |
| 1999–2000 | Shqiponja | 20 | (0) |
| 2000–2002 | Partizani | | |
| 2003 | Besa | 11 | (1) |
| 2003–2004 | Flamurtari | | |

International career
| 1995–1998 | Albania | 4 | (0) |

Managerial career
- 2006: Besa
- 2007–2008: Laçi
- 2009–2019: Shkumbini
- 2010: Besa
- 2010–2011: Shkumbini
- 2011: Tomori
- 2012: Laçi
- 2013: Besa
- * Club domestic league appearances and goals

Përparim Daiu (born 21 April 1970) is a retired Albanian footballer who has served as head coach of several clubs in the Albanian Superliga.

== Club career ==
Daiu played the majority of his career for Besa Kavajë and Partizani Tirana.

== International career ==
He made his debut for Albania in an August 1995 friendly match away against Malta and earned a total of 4 caps, scoring no goals. His final international was a January 1998 friendly against Turkey.

== Managerial career ==
After retiring as a player, Daiu went into coaching and was in charge of hometown club Besa (two spells), Shkumbini (also twice) and Tomori. In January 2012 he took the reins at Laçi for a second time as well. In February 2013 he returned to Besa for a third time as coach.
