= Tomori Stadium =

Multi-use stadium in Berat, Albania

Coordinates: 40°41′56″N 19°57′52″E

- Stadiumi Tomori
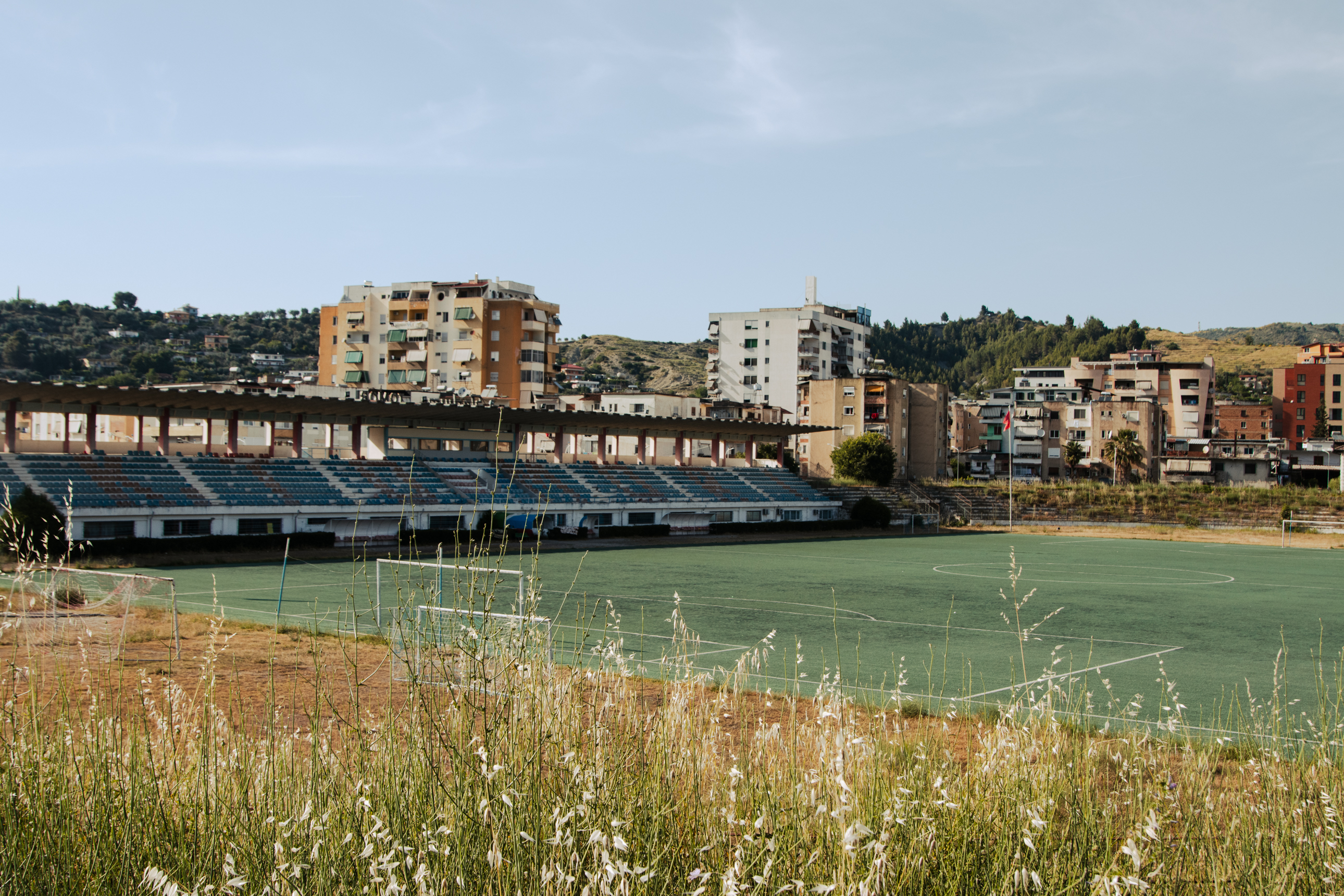
- The Tomori Stadium in 2026
- Interactive map of Tomori Stadium
- Location: Berat, Albania
- Owner: Municipality of Berat
- Capacity: 19.230
- Surface: Artificial grass
- Record attendance: 16,500 Tomori–Albania (15 May 1985)

Construction
- Built: 1985
- Opened: 15 May 1985; 41 years ago
- Renovated: 2011
- Cost: $1.85 million ($5.54 million in 2025 dollars)

Tenant
- Tomori Berat (1985–present)

Tomori Stadium (Albanian: Stadiumi Tomori) is a multi-use stadium in Berat, Albania. It is currently used mostly for football matches and is the home ground of Tomori. The stadium holds around 19,200 people.

== International matches ==
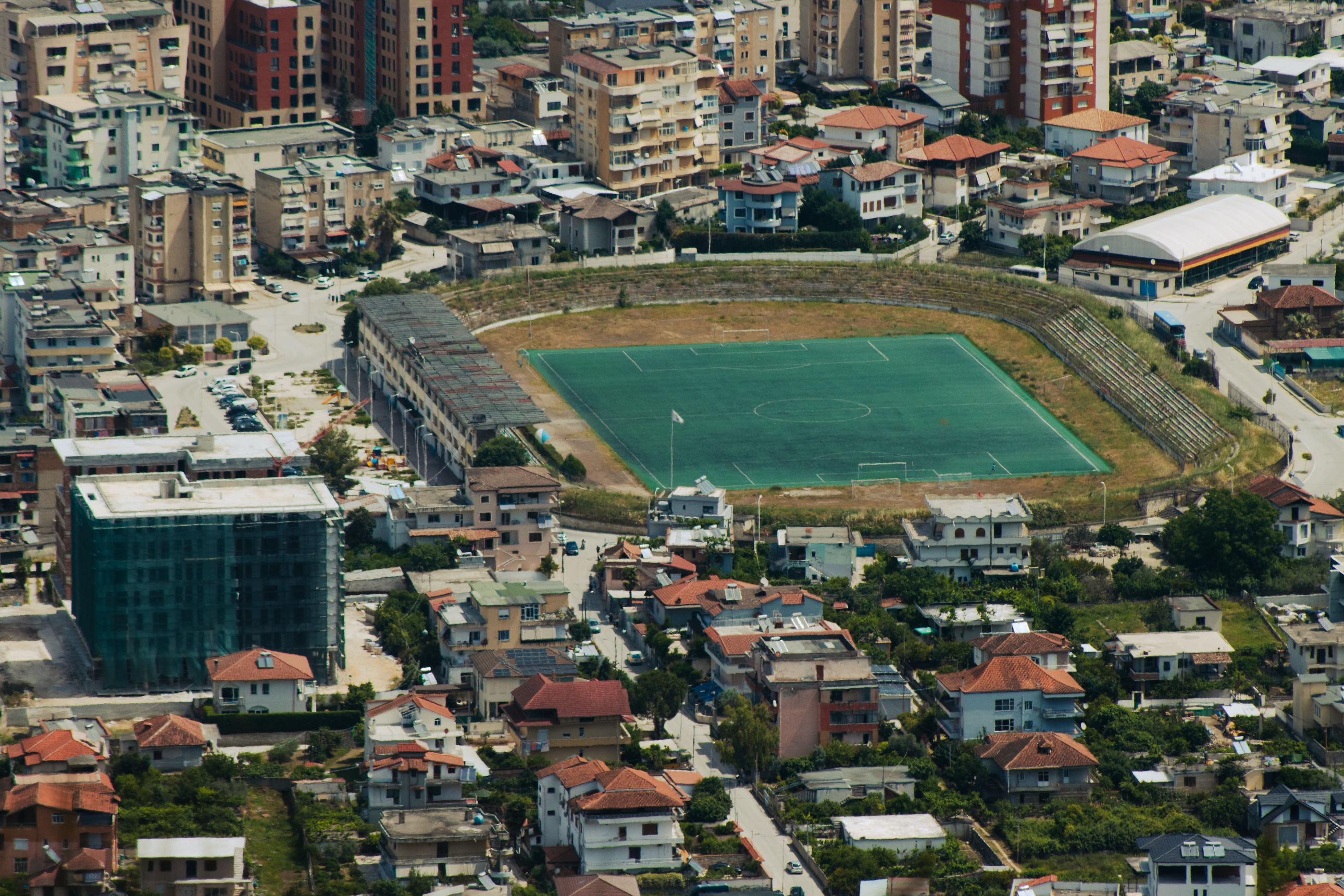
Tomori Stadium as seen from the nearby hills

The Tomori Stadium has hosted 1 friendly match of the Albania national football team.

6 August 1988 International Friendly	Albania	0–0	Cuba	Berat, Albania
16:00		Report		Stadium: Tomori Stadium; Attendance: 4,000; Referee: Dhori Prifti (Albania)
