= Kiichi Miyake =

Kiichi Miyake (三宅 驥一, Miyake Kiichi; 11 November 1876 – 20 March 1964) was a Japanese botanist and professor at the University of Tokyo. His research focus was bryology and pteridology. His undergraduate studies were at Doshisha University and the University of Tokyo. His graduate studies were at Cornell University, where he received his MA in 1901 and PhD in 1902. After finishing his PhD, Miyake was appointed by the government of Taiwan to travel to Europe and perform a two-year study of plant life there.
