= Lucipara Islands =

Coordinates: 5.4943°S 127.5423°E

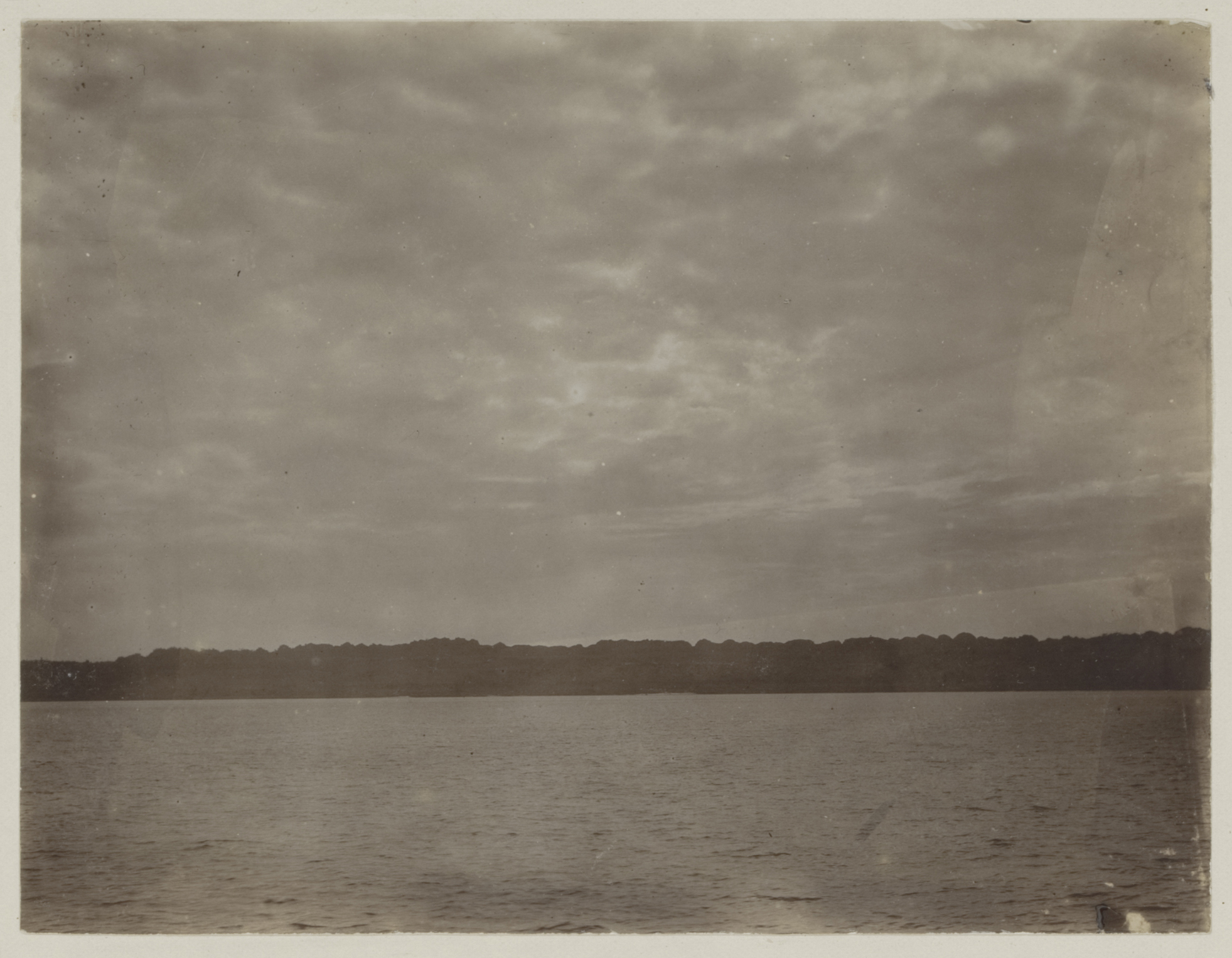
Lucipara Islands in 1899

Lucipara Islands, a.k.a. Pulau-pulau Maisel, are about 50 km west of Penyu Islands, both of which belong to Molucca Islands. They are directly south of Manipa Strait (Selat Manipa) near Ceram. The islands are famous for their sea turtle population.

Edmund Roberts visited the islands briefly in the 19th century. He called them Lucepara in his 1832 journal.

The Lucipara Islands on a map of Indonesia.

Locals that used to live on Pulau Mai stake a claim to the islands. They sometimes harvest the atoll's coconuts.

The Lucipara Islands lie just southwest of the Penyu Islands and just northeast of Skaro Reef.

== Islands ==
The Lucipara Islands are an atoll that consists of three main islands:

- Pulau Selatan
- Pulau Kaurangka
- Pulau Mai
