= Kiichi Tomori =

Japanese footballer

Personal information
- Full name: Kiichi Tomori
- Date of birth: April 22, 1991 (age 35)
- Place of birth: Okinawa, Japan
- Height: 1.70 m (5 ft 7 in)
- Position: Midfielder

Youth career
- 2007–2009: Kyoto Sanga FC
- 2010–2013: Kansai University of International Studies

Senior career*
Years	Team	Apps	(Gls)
2014–2015	FC Ryukyu	26	(1)
Total		26	(1)
- * Club domestic league appearances and goals

Kiichi Tomori (友利 貴一, Tomori Kiichi; born April 22, 1991) is a former Japanese football player.

== Playing career ==
Kiichi Tomori played for J3 League club; FC Ryukyu from 2014 to 2015.
