= FK Tomori =

Albanian football club

Tomori
- Full name: Futboll Klub Tomori
- Nicknames: Tigrat e Beratit; Mistrecët
- Founded: November 25, 1923; 102 years ago
- Ground: Tomori Stadium
- Capacity: 13.350 - 14.500
- Owner: Municipality of Berat
- Manager: Madrit Muzhaj
- League: Kategoria e Dytë, Group B
- 2025–26: Kategoria e Dytë, Group B, 6th
Home colours	Away colours	Third colours

Futboll Klub Tomori is an Albanian football club based in the city of Berat. The club's home ground is the Tomori Stadium and they currently participate in the Kategoria e Dytë.

== History ==
The sport of football was introduced to the city of Berat in the early 1910s by students who had completed their studies abroad. They brought back footballs and the rules of the game from their travels which they then passed onto the locals. As early as 1913, amateur neighbourhood teams were formed, such as Çunat e Lumit, Vakëfi, Kalaja and Opinga. In 1923, an artists and sports club was founded in Berat, under the name Tomori, named after the nearby Mount Tomorr. It was established in the neighbourhood facilities of a local school called Mangalem, and the first team was formed with 18 teenage players. With the Albanian Football Association's foundation in 1930, the club participated in its first official tournament in the same year, which was the second tier of the newly established Albanian football system. Tomori won the 1930 Albanian First Division and gained promotion to the Albanian Superliga. Prior to their debut season in the top flight the club changed its name from Tomori to Muzaka in 1931, and during the 1931 season, they finished in 7th and last place with a record of 1 draw and 5 losses, which led to their relegation. They returned to the Albanian First Division in 1932 where they would remain for 4 seasons. In 1935, the Albanian Football Association did not organise any competitions so the club was not active for the year. In 1936, football resumed in Albania and the club changed its name back to Tomori and finished second in the Albanian First Division, achieving promotion to the Albanian Superliga for the second time. In 1936 season, the club again finished last in the top flight, level on points with Ismail Qemali Vlorë, who they lost 2–1 to in a relegation play off held in Kavajë at the end of the season to determine Tomori's immediate relegation once again.

1936–1949: KS Tomori 1950: Berati 1951–1957: Puna Berati 1957–: KS Tomori

Members of the presidency: (1923–1926) Chairman: Zyhdi Doko Secretary: Shyqyri Lakra Other members: Lilo Xhimitiku Andon Myzeqari Vangjel Haxhistasa Alqiviadhi Shyti

In 1964, Tomori was runner-up in the Albanian Cup, losing in the final to KS Partizani.

Tomori won the Albanian First Division championship four times: in 1930, 1950, 1970, and 1977.

In 1991–1992, F.K Tomori participated in the Balkans Cup but lost on aggregate to FC Oţelul Galaţi (2:4), who went on to be runners-up of the competition.

Their first participation in European football was in the UEFA Cup 2000-01, losing 2–5 on aggregate to Cypriot team APOEL F.C.

In 2000, F.K Tomori were runners-up in the championship, losing on penalty kicks against FK Tirana with the game having finished 1–1 after extra time had been played.

== Stadium ==
Tomori Stadium was built in 1985 and holds 14,500 spectators. This is the third highest capacity stadium in Albania after Qemal Stafa Stadium and Loro Boriçi Stadium. The stadium finally completed its renovation in early 2012, where 13,000 tickets went on sale for the first game held there. Interest was high because the last Albanian Superliga game to be held there was in 2002.

== Fans ==
Tomori has some of the most fervent fans in Albania.

Also, Tomori have tifo-groups like Mistrecat, Berat Hooligans and Ultras Tomori.

=== Rivalries ===
Tomori's biggest rivals are Naftëtari, with Kuçovë only 20 kilometres down the road and with fans of both clubs working together in the textile industry during the 1970s. Also Lushnja and Apolonia Fier are in a small distance from each other.

== Honours ==
- Kategoria e Parë:
  - Winners (4): 1930, 1950–51, 1970–71, 1976–77
  - Runners-up (7): 1957, 1958,1962, 1975–76, 1988–89, 2002–03, 2010–11,
- Kategoria Superiore:
  - Runners-up (1): 1999–00
- Albanian Cup:
  - Runners-up (1): 1963–64
- Balkans Cup:
  - Semi-final (1): 1991–92
- Albanian Second Division:
  - Winners (1): 2015–16

== European Cups history ==
=== 2000–01 UEFA Cup ===
After finishing second in the 1999–2000 season, Tomori would play for the first time against APOEL. Since that year the team has never been able to play in European competitions. Gentian Lako was the first player to score a goal for Tomori in a UEFA CUP qualifying round.

- QR1=1st Qualifying Round

Season	Competition	Round	Country	Team	Home	Away	Aggregate
1991–92	Balkans Cup	SF	(Romania)	Oțelul Galați	2–0	0–4	2–4
2000–01	UEFA Cup	QR1	(Cyprus)	APOEL	2–3	0–2	2–5

=== Recent seasons ===
Year	Division	Position
1999-2000	Albanian Superliga (I)	2nd
2000-01	Albanian Superliga (I)	12th
2001-02	Albanian Superliga (I)	14th
2002–03	Albanian First Division (II)	2nd
2003–04	Albanian First Division (II)	6 th
2004–05	Albanian First Division (II)	4th
2005–06	Albanian First Division (II)	6th
2006–07	Albanian First Division (II)	16th
2007–08	Albanian First Division(II)	16th
2008-09	Albanian Second Division (III)	3rd
2009–10	Albanian Second Division(III)	2nd
2010–11	Albanian First Division	2nd
2011-12	Albanian Superliga (I)	10th
2012-13	Albanian Superliga (I)	12th
2013-14	Albanian First Division (II)	4th
2014–15	Albanian First Division (II)	9th
2015-16	Albanian Second Division (III)	1st
2016-17	Albanian First Division (II)	5th
2017-18	Albanian First Division (II)	4th - Promotion Round
2018-19	Albanian First Division (II)	10th
2019-20	Albanian Second Division (III)	2nd
2020-21	Albanian First Division (II)	2nd Promotion Round
2021-22	Albanian First Division (II)	6th
2022-23	Albanian First Division (II)	4th - Promotion Round
2023-24	Albanian First Division (II)	12th
2024-25	Albanian Second Division (III)	3rd - Promotion Round
2025-26	Albanian Second Division (III)	6th
2026-27	Albanian Second Division (III)	

== Players ==
=== Current squad ===
As of 5 April 2024

Note: Flags indicate national team as defined under FIFA eligibility rules; some limited exceptions apply. Players may hold more than one non-FIFA nationality.

No.	Pos.	Nation	Player
—	GK	ALB	Hermes Gjata
—	GK	ALB	Renco Memlika
—	GK	ALB	Bahir Mesiti
—	GK	ALB	Divaldo Zema
—	DF	ALB	Edmond Arëza
—	DF	KOS	Shkambi Baruti (on loan from Partizani Tirana)
—	DF	ALB	Elvis Gjoni
—	DF	ALB	Kevin Hysolli (on loan from Skënderbeu Korçë)
—	DF	ALB	Rei Lala
—	DF	GRE	Alen Luta (on loan from Tirana)
—	DF	ALB	Xhoel Vrapi
—	MF	ALB	Durion Hadaj
—	MF	ALB	Xhoi Hajdëraj
—	MF	ALB	Sajdi Hamzai

No.	Pos.	Nation	Player
—	MF	ALB	Erald Hyseni
—	MF	ALB	Oresti Kasmollari (on loan from Dinamo City)
—	MF	ALB	Gledio Kule
—	MF	ALB	Sali Kumani
—	MF	ALB	Xheison Lajthia
—	MF	ALB	Fjordi Mesiti
—	MF	ALB	Fernando Ndrejaj
—	MF	ALB	Jurgen Pasmaciu
—	FW	ALB	Klejdon Arbri
—	FW	ALB	Theodor Buda
—	FW	ALB	Ervis Çaço
—	FW	ALB	Marjus Kola
—	FW	ECU	Frank Obando
—	FW	ALB	Aldrit Oshafi

=== Notable players ===
- (Albania) Theodhor Arbëri
- (Albania) Arben Arbëri
- (Albania) Përparim Kovaçi
- (Albania) Klodian Arbëri
- (Albania) Polizoi Arbëri
- (Albania) Kliton Bozgo
- (Nigeria) James Adeniyi
- (Albania) Ilirjan Çaushaj
- (Albania) Myrto Uzuni

=== Top scorers of Albanian Superliga ===
Season	Player	Club	Goals
1980	(Albania) Përparim Kovaçi	Tomori	18
1987	(Albania) Arben Arbëri	Tomori	14
1991	(Albania) Kliton Bozgo	Tomori	29
2000	(Albania) Klodian Arbëri	Tomori	18

== Coaching staff and officials ==
Position	Name
Manager	(Albania) Klodian Arbëri
Assistant manager	(Albania) Polizoi Arbëri
Goalkeeper manager	(Albania) Madrit Muxhaj
Medic of club	(Albania) Elton Fani
Fitness coach	(Albania) Altin Allidri
Club Secretary	(Albania) Ismet Ajazi

== List of managers ==
- (Albania) Mandi Xhamo (1973)
- (Albania) Guxim Mukli (1990–1991)
- (Albania) Fatos Karkanjozi (1992–1994)
- (Albania) Kristaq Mile (1994)
- (Albania) Fatos Karkanjozi (1995)
- (Albania) Kristaq Mile (1995)
- (Albania) Fatos Karkanjozi (1996)
- (Albania) Kristaq Mile (1996–1997)
- (Albania) Theodhor Arbëri (1998–2000)
- (Albania) Kristaq Mile (2000–2001)
- (Albania) Theodhor Arbëri (2001)
- (Albania) Saimir Dauti (2001–2002)
- (Albania) Kristaq Mile (2002)
- (Albania) Eqerem Memushi (Jul 2010 – 22 Jan 2011)
- (Albania) Artan Bano (22 Jan 2011 – May 2011)
- (Albania) Përparim Daiu (Aug 2011 – 2 Oct 2011)
- (Albania) Eqerem Memushi (2 Oct 2011 – 15 Mar 2012)
- (Albania) Madrit Muzhaj (interim) (Mar 2012)
- (Albania) Ernest Gjoka (15 Mar 2012 – Jun 2012)
- (Albania) Kristaq Mile (Jul 2012 – 8 Nov 2012)
- (Albania) Madrit Muxhaj (Nov 2012 – Jun 2014)
- (Albania) Eqerem Memushi (Jul 2014 - Dec 2014)
- (Albania) Madrit Muxhaj (Dec 2014 – Apr 2015)
- (Albania) Kristaq Mile (Apr 2015 - May 2015)
- (Albania) Bledar Sinella (Aug 2015 – Nov 2016)
- (Albania) Gentian Stojku (Nov 2016 - Apr 2017)
- (Albania) Santiljano Dule (Jul 2017 - Nov 2017)
- (Albania) Gersi Arbëri (Nov 2017 - Sep 2018)
- (Albania) Bledar Devolli (Sep 2018 - Dec 2018)
- (Albania) Santiljano Dule (Jan 2019 August 2019 )
- (Albania) Kristaq Mile (August 2019 – June 2020 )
- (Albania) Bledar Sinella (June 2020 – July 2021)
- (Albania) Klevis Dalipi (July 2021 – Dec 2021)
- (Albania) Klodian Arbëri (Jan 2022 – Oct 2023)
- (Albania) Avenir Bejo (Oct 2023 – Nov 2023)
- (Albania) Febron Ziu (Nov 2023 – Mar 2024)
- (Albania) Iken Dobroniku (Mar 2024– Jun 2025)
- (Albania) Klodian Arbëri (Aug 2025 – May 2026)
- (Albania) Madrit Muxhaj (Sep 2026 –)
