= Polizoi Arbëri =

Albanian footballer

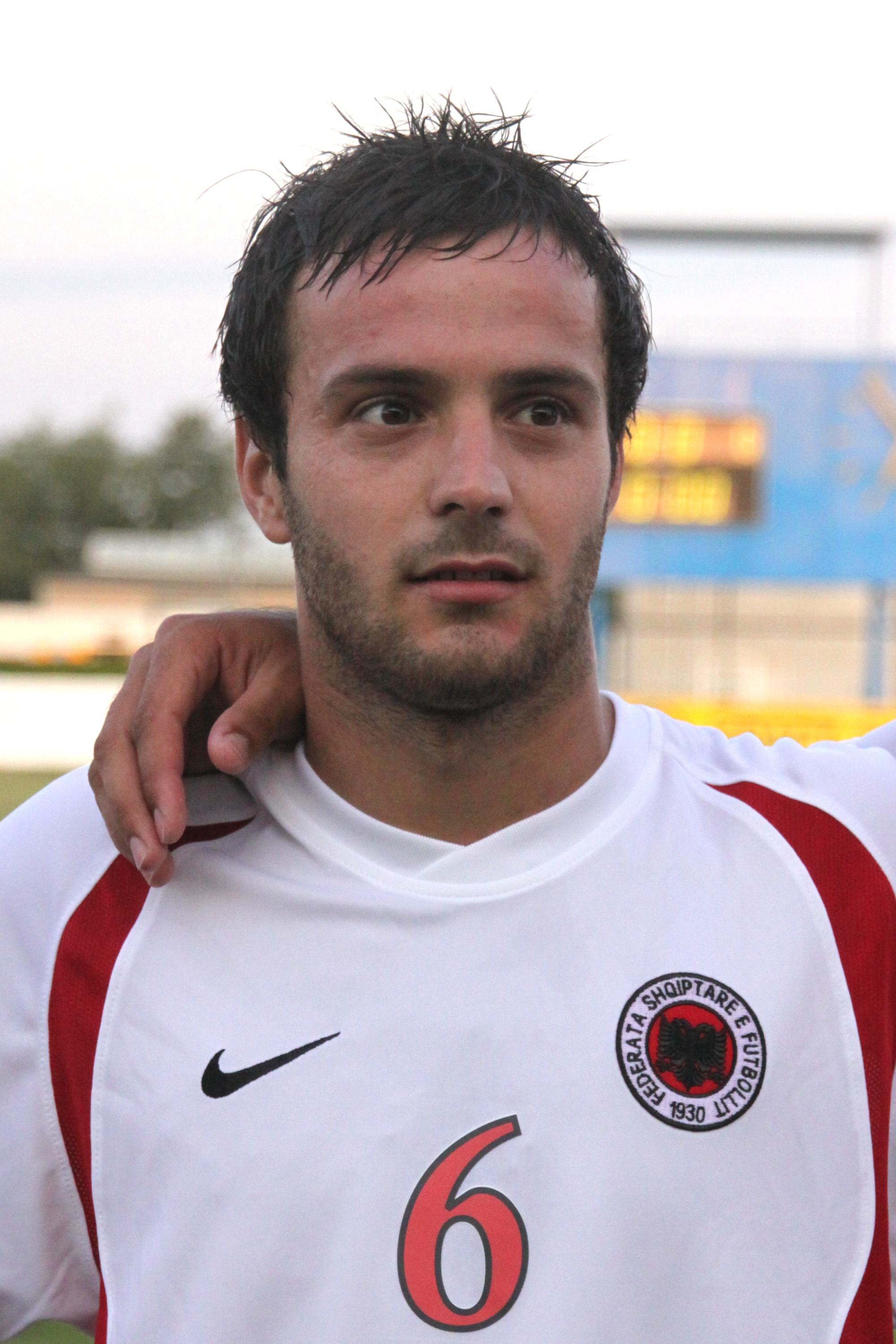

Personal information
- Full name: Polizoi Arbëri
- Date of birth: 9 September 1988 (age 38)
- Place of birth: Berat, Albania
- Height: 1.82 m (5 ft 11 1/2 in)
- Positions: Defender; midfielder

Youth career
- 2002–2006: Tomori Berat

Senior career*
Years	Team	Apps	(Gls)
2006–2007	Tomori Berat	16	(0)
2007–2009	Lushnja	18	(1)
2009–2011	Bylis Ballsh	57	(5)
2011–2015	Flamurtari Vlorë	84	(4)
2015–2016	Vllaznia Shkodër	19	(1)
2016–2017	Kukësi	1	(0)
Total		195	(11)

International career^{‡}
2004–2005	Albania U17	3	(0)
2005–2007	Albania U19	2	(0)
2008–2010	Albania U21	6	(1)
- * Club domestic league appearances and goals as of 29 July 2017 ‡ National team caps and goals as of 16 March 2016

Polizoi Arbëri (born 9 September 1988) is an Albanian former footballer who played as a defender or midfielder.

== Club career ==
=== Vllaznia Shkodër ===
On 15 August 2015, Arbëri signed a one-year deal with fellow Albanian Superliga side Vllaznia Shkodër as a free transfer. He was presented to the media two days later, where he was allocated squad number 13. During his presentation, Arbëri said: "I'm very happy with my choice. I'm glad that i'm going to be with Vllaznia for the upcoming season. I know this squad and naturally signed for this team for its name."

He made his Vllaznia Shkodër debut on 9 September 2015 in the league match against Skënderbeu Korçë, playing full-90 minutes in a losing effort at neutral ground of Ismail Xhemali Stadium. On 30 September, in his Albanian Cup debut against Pogradeci for the second leg of the first round, Arbëri successfully converted a penalty-kick for his first goal of the season, helping the team to win the match 4–0 and to progress in the next round with the aggregate 5–1.

Arbëri scored his first league goal of the season against Tirana on 25 October in a 1–1 draw; he scored the goal in the 86th minute with a precise curled free-kick to help his team to earn a point in the bid to escape relegation. He dedicated the goal to the fans.

On 16 March 2016, Arbëri suffered an injury in his left knee that would rule him out for the rest of 2015–16 season. At the end of the month, it was reported that he would undergo surgery in his left knee on 12 or 13 April and also extended his contract with the club for another one season. He was eventually operated on 15 April.

=== Kukësi ===
On 13 June 2016, Arbëri joined fellow Albanian Superliga side Kukësi by signing an initial one-year contract with an option of a further one. His debut occurred on 24 August in the Albanian Supercup match against Skënderbeu Korçë, playing full-90 minutes as Kukësi won 3–1 at Selman Stërmasi Stadium to win its maiden Albanian Supercup title. His league debut came later on 8 September in the opening matchday against his former side Vllaznia Shkodër. He played the entire match which ended in a goalless draw. One week later, Arbëri suffered another major knee injury just before the start of the second matchday against Teuta Durrës. He torn the ligament of his right leg, which kept him sidelined for the next five months. In April of the following year, Arbëri was released from the club after his constant knee issues.

=== Retirement ===
On 14 July 2017, with his knee not getting healed, Arbëri decided to retire from football at the age of 28, thus ending his 10-year career. In an interview, he said that not winning the title with Kukësi was his biggest regret in football, also adding that he felt like home at Vllaznia.

== International career ==
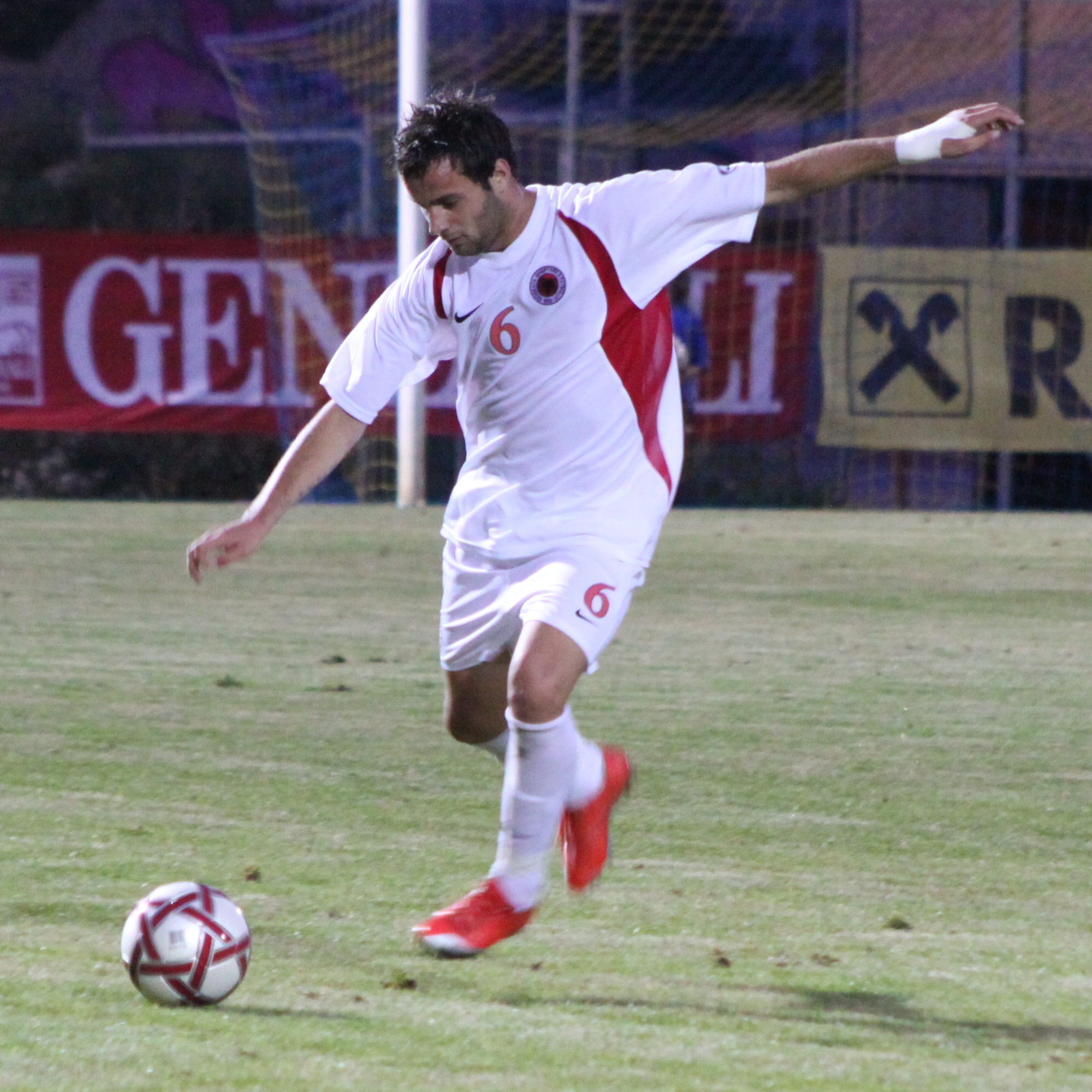
Polizoi Arbëri in action for Albania U-21 in 2009

Arbëri was first called up to the Albania U21 side in April 2008 by coach Artan Bushati. He was called up along with players also uncapped at U21 level such as Shpëtim Moçka and Vilfor Hysa. Bushati the players through their paces in Kamëz as they were playing for a place in his U21 side.

His first U21 goal came in a friendly against Macedonia at the Biljanini Izvori Sports Hall in Ohrid on 19 November 2008. Arbëri netted the third and final goal for Albania in a 3–0 victory. His goal came in the 80th minute of the game as a result of some excellent play by Enco Malindi who set up the goal for Arbëri.

== Personal life ==
Arbëri is the younger brother of Gersi Arbëri, who is also a professional footballer who plays for Tomori Berat in the Albanian First Division. He have a son named Noel.

== Career statistics ==
As of 8 September 2016

Club	Season	League			Cup		Europe		Other		Total	
Club	Season	Division	Apps	Goals	Apps	Goals	Apps	Goals	Apps	Goals	Apps	Goals
Tomori Berat	2005–06	Albanian First Division	?	?	?	?	—		—		?	?
Tomori Berat	2006–07	Albanian First Division	?	?	?	?	—		—		?	?
Tomori Berat	Total		16	0	?	?	—		—		16	0
Lushnja	2007–08	Albanian First Division	?	?	?	?	—		—		?	?
Lushnja	2008–09	Albanian Superliga	16	1	2	0	—		—		18	1
Lushnja	Total		16	1	2	0	—		—		18	1
Bylis Ballsh	2008–09	Albanian Superliga	14	0	1	0	—		—		15	0
Bylis Ballsh	2009–10	Albanian First Division	16	3	0	0	—		—		16	3
Bylis Ballsh	2008–09	Albanian Superliga	27	2	3	0	—		—		30	2
Bylis Ballsh	Total		57	5	4	0	—		—		61	5
Flamurtari Vlorë	2011–12	Albanian Superliga	24	1	11	0	4 (Note: All appearance(s) in UEFA Europa League)	0	—		39	1
Flamurtari Vlorë	2012–13	Albanian Superliga	19	0	8	0	2	0	—		29	0
Flamurtari Vlorë	2013–14	Albanian Superliga	20	3	2	0	—		—		29	0
Flamurtari Vlorë	2014–15	Albanian Superliga	21	0	2	0	4	0	1 (Note: Appearance in Albanian Supercup)	0	28	0
Flamurtari Vlorë	Total		84	4	23	0	10	0	1	0	118	4
Vllaznia Shkodër	2015–16	Albanian Superliga	19	1	2	1	—		—		21	2
Vllaznia Shkodër	Total		19	1	2	1	—		—		21	2
Kukësi	2016–17	Albanian Superliga	1	0	0	0	0	0	1	0	2	0
Kukësi	Total		1	0	0	0	0	0	1	0	2	0
Career total			193	11	31	0	10	0	2	0	236	11

== Honours ==
Flamurtari Vlorë

- Albanian Cup: 2013–14
- Albanian Supercup runner-up: 2014

Kukësi

- Albanian Supercup: 2016
