= KF Shkumbini =

Albanian football club

Shkumbini
- Full name: Klubi i Futbollit Shkumbini
- Nicknames: Çunat e Peqinit; Luanët Bardhekaltër
- Founded: 20 April 1924; 102 years ago
- Ground: Shkumbini Stadium
- Capacity: 5,000
- Owners: Peqin Municipality
- Manager: Florenc Hasbajrami
- League: Kategoria e Tretë
- 2025–26: Kategoria e Dytë, Group B, 11th (excluded)
Home colours	Away colours

Klubi i Futbollit Shkumbini is an Albanian football club based in the town of Peqin. The club's home ground is the Shkumbini Stadium and they compete in the Kategoria e Tretë.

== History ==
Football was first introduced to the city of Peqin in the early 1920s after an army officer from Shkodër brought along a ball with him. An amateur club was formed in 1924 by Adem Bedali and other local men who had begun playing football. In the club's infancy they played friendly games with teams from other cities in Albania, before the creation of the Albanian Football Association in 1930 who organised the first official football competitions in the country. Shkumbini's first trophy came in 1936 when they defeated Apolonia Fier to win the Kategoria e Dytë. They remained in the lower divisions until 1994, when they finished 2nd in the Kategoria e Parë and achieved promotion to the Kategoria Superiore for the first time in the club's history. In their debut season in the top flight they finished in a respectable 7th place out of 16 teams, with a record of 11 wins, 8 draws and 11 losses. The club finished in 4th place in the 1997–98 season in the Kategoria Superiore, and striker Dorian Bubeqi was the league's top goalscorer with 26 goals.

== Current squad ==
As of 21 September 2019

Note: Flags indicate national team as defined under FIFA eligibility rules; some limited exceptions apply. Players may hold more than one non-FIFA nationality.

No.	Pos.	Nation	Player
1	GK	ALB	Klajdi Hasanaj
2	DF	ALB	Amarildo Beqiri
3	DF	ALB	Ergin Ibërshimi
4	MF	ALB	Jurgen Nexha
5	DF	ALB	Daniel Ramazani
6	MF	ALB	Albano Isaj
7	MF	ALB	Bledar Lila
8	FW	ALB	Erxhers Bullari
9	FW	ALB	Sherif Sadiku
10	FW	ALB	Erjon Mustafaj
11	DF	ALB	Viktor Gjyla
12	GK	ALB	Selami Ajazi
13	MF	ALB	Alemao Zdrava
14	DF	ALB	Xhinaldo Tufa
15	DF	ALB	Andi Bakiasi
16	DF	ALB	Mishel Hasbajrami
17	FW	NGR	Effiong Eyoh

No.	Pos.	Nation	Player
18	MF	ALB	Erlind Koreshi
19	GK	ALB	Gerald Leka
19	FW	ALB	Rustem Meta
21	DF	ALB	Franci Bufazi
24	FW	ALB	Elidion Mara
—	GK	ALB	Denis Peqini
—	DF	ALB	Ardit Aruçi
—	DF	ALB	Leodor Bërdufi
—	DF	ALB	Armando Çela
—	DF	ALB	Besim Leka
—	DF	ALB	Fadil Meta
—	DF	ALB	Klemend Xhyra
—	MF	BRA	Adalton
—	MF	ALB	Alban Bizhyti
—	MF	ALB	Andi Likaj
—	MF	ALB	Emilian Lluca
—	MF	ALB	Elisjan Sinani

== Technical staff ==
Position	Name
Head coach	(Albania) Ferdinand Bilali
Goalkeeping coach	(Albania) Arianit Ballhysa
Fitness coach	(Albania) Orges Demiri
Club doctor	(Albania) Gani Spahiu
Club Secretary	(Albania) Astrit Isaj

== List of managers ==
- (Albania) Shamil Dylgjeri (1993–1994)
- (Albania) Edmond Bedalli (1994–1995)
- (Albania) Shyqyri Rreli (1995)
- (Albania) Vasil Bici (1996–1998)
- (Albania) Agustin Kola (1998)
- (Albania) Luan Deliu (1999)
- (Albania) Ramadan Shehu (1999–2000)
- (Albania) Artin Kovaçi (2000)
- (Albania) Stavri Nica (2001)
- (Albania) Luan Deliu (2001)
- (Albania) Ramadan Shehu (2001–2002)
- (Albania) Astrit Sejdini (2002)
- (Albania) Eduard Abazi (2002–2003)
- (Albania) Vasil Bici (2003)
- (Albania) Agim Canaj (Jul 2004 - 16 January 2005)
- (Albania) Faruk Sejdini (16 January 2005 – 24 September 2005)
- (Albania) Alfred Ferko (24 September 2005 – 3 November 2005)
- (Albania) Sulejman Demollari (3 November 2005 – 22 January 2006)
- (Albania) Faruk Sejdini (22 January 2006 – Jun 2006)
- (Albania) Vasil Bici (Jul 2006 - 31 October 2006)
- (Albania) Faruk Sejdini (31 October 2006 – Jun 2007)
- (Albania) Gugash Magani (Jul 2007 – 16 May 2009)
- (Albania) Sokol Branica (16 May 2009 – Jun 2009)
- (Albania) Gugash Magani (Jul 2009 – 30 September 2009)
- (Albania) Kristaq Mile (30 September 2009 – 19 December 2009)
- (Albania) Përparim Daiu (19 December 2009 – June 2010)
- (Albania) Mirel Josa (June 2010 – 1 September 2010)
- (Albania) Agim Canaj (1 September 2010 – 3 December 2010)
- (Albania) Përparim Daiu (3 December 2010 – 13 March 2011)
- (Albania) Kristaq Mile (13 March 2011 – June 2012)
- (Albania) Gugash Magani (July 2012 – 12 November 2012)
- (Albania) Kristaq Mile (12 November 2012 – May 2013)
- (Albania) Sokol Branica (Aug 2013 – May 2014)
- (Albania) Ilirjan File (Mar 2015 – Oct 2015)
- (Albania) Kristaq Mile (Oct 2015 – May 2016)
- (Albania) Sokol Branica (Aug 2016 – Mar 2018)
- (Albania) Artan Bano (Mar 2018 – May 2019)
- (Albania) Sokol Branica (May 2019 – Dec 2019)
- (Albania) Lorenc Pasha (Jan 2020 – Aug 2021)
- (Albania) Artan Bano (Aug 2021 – Aug 2021)
- (Albania) Lorenc Pasha (Aug 2021 –Dec 2021)
- (Cameroon) Love Kestelot (Jan 2022 –Apr 2022)
- (Albania) Sokol Branica (Apr 2022 – May 2022)
- (Albania) Lorenc Hansbajrami (May 2022 – Jun 2022)
- (Albania) Hetlem Çapja (Jun 2022 – Oct 2023)
- (Turkey) İlknur Aktaş (Oct 2023 – Oct 2023)
- (Albania) Ferdinand Bilali (Oct 2023 – Jan 2024)
- (Albania) Vladimir Gjoni (Jan 2024 – Feb 2024)
- (Turkey) İlknur Aktaş (Feb 2024 – Feb 2024)
- (Albania) Stavri Nica (Feb 2024 – Jun 2024)
- (Albania) Anxhelo Suta (Jul 2024 – Jan 2025)
- (Albania) Elvis Uku (Jan 2025 – Feb 2025)
- (Albania) Florent Hasbajrami (Feb 2025 – Jun 2025)
- (Albania) Lorenc Pasha (Sep 2025 –)
