= Ismet =

Ismet (Turkish: İsmet) is the Turkish form of the Arabic name Ismat, which comes from Ismah. Along with Turkish, the name is also seen in Albanian, Bosnian, and Macedonian. Notable people with the name include:

== Given name ==
- Ismet Ahmad (1945–2023), Indonesian politician and academic
- Ismet Akpinar (born 1995), German basketball player
- Ismet Asllani (1955–1999), Kosovan businessman, humanitarian and army commander
- İsmet Atlı (1931–2014), Turkish Olympic medalist sports wrestler
- İsmet Ay (1924–2004), Turkish actor
- Ismet Azizi (born 1960), Kosovan professor and journalist
- Ismet Bajramović (1966–2008), Bosnian soldier
- Ismet Đuherić (1949–2025), Bosnian WWII army commander
- Ismet Ekmečić (born 1969), Slovenian footballer
- İsmet Elçi (born 1964), German-Turkish writer
- Ismet Kaya Erdem (born 1928), Turkish politician
- İsmet Ergün (born 1950), German artist and stage designer
- Ismet Godinjak (born 1973), Bosnian volleyball player
- İsmet Güney (1923–2009), Turkish Cypriot artist, cartoonist, teacher and painter
- Ismet Hadžić (1954–2015), Bosnian footballer
- Ismet Horo (born 1959), Bosnian comedian
- Ismet Hoxha (born 1948), Albanian footballer
- İsmet Hürmüzlü (1938–2013), Iraqi Turkmen actor, director and screenwriter
- İsmet İbrahimoğlu (1943–1989), Turkish chess player
- İsmet İnönü (1884–1973), second President of Turkey
- Ismet Iskandar (1948–2024), Indonesian politician
- Ismet Jashari (1967–1998), Albanian member of the Kosovo Liberation Army
- İsmet Kotak (1939–2011), Turkish Cypriot politician, administrator, columnist and journalist
- Ismet Bey Kryeziu (1889–1952), Albanian political figure
- İsmet Kür (1916–2013), Turkish female educator, journalist, columnist and writer of mainly children's literature
- Ismet Lushaku (born 2000), Kosovan footballer
- İsmet Miroğlu (1944–1997), Turkish academic
- Ismet Muftić (1876–1945), Bosnian imam
- Ismet Mulavdić (born 1968), Bosnian footballer
- Ismet Munishi (born 1974), Kosovan footballer and manager
- İsmet Özel (born 1944), Turkish poet and scholar
- Ismet Peja (1937–2020), Kosovan Albanian folk singer
- Ismet Popovac (1902–1943), Bosnian lawyer, physician and Chetnik leader
- Ismet Ramadan (born 1998), Bulgarian footballer
- Ismet Rizvić (1933–1992), Bosnian artist
- Ismet Sejfić (born 1993), Bosnian basketballer
- Ismet Alajbegović Šerbo (1925–1987), Bosnian accordionist
- İsmet Sezgin (1928–2016), Turkish politician
- Ismet Shehu, Albanian chef
- Ismet Sinani (born 1999), Kosovan footballer
- Ismet Šišić (born 1958), Bosnian footballer
- Ismet Štilić (born 1960), former Bosnian footballer
- İsmet Taşdemir (born 1974), Turkish football manager
- Ismet Toto (1908–1937), Albanian writer, bureaucrat and political activist
- İsmet Uçma (1955–2021), Turkish politician and parliamentarian
- İsmet Uluğ (1901–1975), Turkish footballer and boxer
- Ismet Cheriff Vanly (1924–2011), Kurdish scholar and political activist
- İsmet Yılmaz (born 1961), Turkish politician
- Ali İsmet Öztürk (born 1964), Turkish aerobatics pilot

== See also ==
- Ismat
- Ismet Pasa, Guzelyurt, historical name of Morphou, a Cypriot town
- İsmetpaşa, town in Eşkişehir, Turkey
- İsmetpaşa, Karacabey, village in Turkey
- İsmetpaşa Stadı, stadium in Izmit, Turkey
