= Xhevahir Kapllani =

Albanian footballer and manager

Personal information
- Date of birth: 21 June 1974 (age 52)
- Place of birth: Durrës, Albania
- Height: 1.82 m (6 ft 0 in)
- Position: Goalkeeper

Senior career*
Years	Team	Apps	(Gls)
1991–1996	Teuta	116	(0)
1996–1997	Lushnja	17	(0)
1997–1998	Dinamo Tirana	16	(0)
1998–1999	Teuta	23	(0)
1999	Dinamo Tirana	6	(0)
1999–2000	Partizani	11	(0)
2000–2001	Shqiponja/Luftëtari	32	(0)
2001–2003	Erzeni	46	(0)
2003	Bashkimi	5	(0)
2004	Besa	16	(0)
2004–2008	Teuta	112	(1)
Total		400	(1)

International career
1992–1993	Albania U21	7	(0)
1993–1996	Albania	5	(0)

Managerial career
- 2010–2012: Sukthi
- 2016–2017: Teuta (assistant)
- 2020–2021: Teuta U19
- 2022–2023: Erzeni
- 2023: Luzi 2008
- * Club domestic league appearances and goals

Xhevahir Kapllani (Albanian pronunciation: [d͡ʒɛvaˈhiɾ kapˈɫani]; born 21 June 1974) is an Albanian former professional footballer who played as a goalkeeper, and later became a football manager.

He spent his entire playing career in top-flight football, mainly in the Albanian Superliga, representing hometown club Teuta, with whom he won the 1993–94 Albanian Superliga title and the Albanian Cup in 1994–95 and 2004–05, as well as capital clubs Dinamo Tirana and Partizani, Lushnja, Luftëtari, Erzeni, and Besa, and also had a spell abroad in the Macedonian First Football League with Bashkimi. He is noted for a run of 824 consecutive minutes without conceding a goal for Teuta between 2 October 1993 and 5 February 1994, which contributed to the club’s 1993–94 league title-winning season.

Internationally, Kapllani represented Albania U21 and also made five appearances for the Albania senior team between 1993 and 1996.

== Club career ==
=== Teuta ===
He made his professional debut for Teuta during the 1991–92 Albanian Superliga season, making 12 league appearances as the club finished third in the table. In the following 1992–93 Albanian Superliga season, he established himself as the first-choice goalkeeper for Teuta, making 27 league appearances as the club finished in second place. During the 1993–94 Albanian Superliga season, he played a key role in Teuta’s title-winning campaign, the club’s only Albanian Superliga championship, keeping a clean sheet for 824 consecutive minutes between 2 October 1993 and 5 February 1994 and significantly contributing to the success, with the run being noted as placing him 148th in the global ranking for longest clean-sheet streaks. In the following season, he made his debut in European competitions on 23 August 1994 in the second leg of the 1994–95 UEFA Cup preliminary round against Cypriot side Apollon Limassol, as Teuta lost 4–2 away and were eliminated 8–3 on aggregate. In the 1994–95 Albanian Superliga season, he made 29 appearances as Teuta finished again in second place, while also winning the 1994–95 Albanian Cup.

In August 1995, he featured in both legs of the 1995–96 UEFA Cup Winners' Cup qualifying round against Finnish side TPS, playing the full 90 minutes in each match, and after Teuta lost the first leg 1–0 away in Finland, he kept a clean sheet in the second leg as Teuta won 3–0 at home to advance to the next round with a 3–1 aggregate victory. On 14 September 1995, he made his debut in a major European competition in the first leg of the 1995–96 UEFA Cup Winners' Cup first round against 1994–95 UEFA Cup winners, Italian side Parma, keeping a clean sheet until the 75th minute before conceding twice to Gianfranco Zola in a 2–0 home defeat at Qemal Stafa Stadium. He also played the full 90 minutes in the second leg away on 28 September 1995, but Teuta were again defeated 2–0, losing 4–0 on aggregate and being eliminated from the competition. In the 1995–96 Albanian Superliga season, he made 33 appearances as the club once again finished as runners-up, before leaving in the summer of 1996 with a total of 116 league appearances.

=== Lushnja, Dinamo Tirana and return to Teuta ===
He joined Lushnja in 1996, where he was later coached by former Argentina international and 1986 FIFA World Cup winner Mario Kempes, making 17 league appearances in the 1996–97 Albanian Superliga as the club finished 7th. After one season with Lushnja, he joined Dinamo Tirana, where he made 16 league appearances in the 1997–98 Albanian Superliga, helping the club avoid relegation from the top flight. For the 1998–99 Albanian Superliga season he made his return to Teuta after two years, making 23 appearances in the first half of the season before rejoining Dinamo Tirana, where he added a further 6 appearances as the team finished 6th.

=== Partizani and Gjirokastër ===
He remained in the capital by joining Partizani for the 1999–2000 Albanian Superliga season, making 11 league appearances before leaving in the winter of 2000 to join Shqiponja Gjirokastër, where he made 13 appearances as the club finished 9th in the league. In the following 2000–01 Albanian Superliga season, Shqiponja changed its name to Luftëtari Gjirokastër, and Kapllani made 19 league appearances as the club finished 8th in the league.

=== Erzeni ===
In the summer of 2001, he joined Erzeni and made 22 league appearances in the 2001–02 Albanian Superliga season as the club finished 12th, avoiding relegation. In his second season, the 2002–03 Albanian Superliga, he made 24 league appearances and kept eight clean sheets as Erzeni again finished 12th, retaining their top-flight status for another season.

=== 2003–04: Bashkimi (abroad) and Besa Kavajë ===
In the summer of 2003, he moved abroad for the first time by joining Bashkimi in the 2003–04 Macedonian First Football League, where he had a brief spell and made only 5 appearances in the first half of the season. He then returned to Albania and joined Besa Kavajë, making 16 league appearances in the second half of the 2003–04 Albanian Superliga season, where he kept also three clean-sheets as the club finished 9th.

=== Third spell at Teuta ===
In the summer of 2004, he returned to Teuta for a third spell ahead of the 2004–05 Albanian Superliga season, establishing himself again as the first-choice goalkeeper, making 29 league appearances and scored the only goal of his professional career, while Teuta finished 5th in the league and won the 2004–05 Albanian Cup. He began the 2005–06 season with participation in the 2005–06 UEFA Cup first qualifying round by playing both legs in full against Široki Brijeg, as Teuta won 3–1 at home, but was overturned by a 3–0 away defeat in Bosnia and Herzegovina, resulting in elimination. In the 2005–06 Albanian Superliga season, he played 35 of 36 league matches and kept 10 clean sheets, although Teuta finished 8th and entered the relegation play-off against Skënderbeu, where Kapllani played the full match as Teuta secured a 1–0 victory, enough to retain their top-flight status.

In the 2006–07 Albanian Superliga season, he made 26 league appearances, conceding 26 goals and keeping 15 clean sheets, as Teuta finished as runners-up with 67 points. In his final season, 2007–08, he made his third UEFA Cup appearance by playing both legs of the 2007–08 UEFA Cup first qualifying round against Croatian side Slaven Belupo, as Teuta suffered a 6–2 first-leg defeat before earning a 2–2 draw in the return match, losing 8–4 on aggregate. In the 2007–08 Albanian Superliga season, he made 22 league appearances and kept 5 clean sheets as Teuta recorded only 6 wins and 5 draws by March 2008. The club eventually finished fourth from bottom and entered the play-out, where they secured a 2–1 win over Burreli to retain their place in the top flight.

He retired at the end of the 2007–08 season, having made around 120 appearances during his third spell with Teuta, which took his overall tally with the club to around 260 appearances in all competitions, while also reaching exactly 400 top-flight league appearances in his professional career.

== International career ==
Kapllani represented Albania U21 between 1992 and 1993, being the main starting goalkeeper during the 1994 UEFA European Under-21 Championship qualification campaign, playing in seven of the eight group matches and kept one clean sheet, in a 1–0 win against Denmark on 8 September 1993, Albania's only victory of the tournament.

He made his senior debut for the Albania on 17 February 1993 in a 1994 FIFA World Cup qualification match against Northern Ireland, a 1–2 home defeat. He also played in another qualification group match in a 3–1 away defeat to Lithuania on 14 April 1993. He earned a total of 5 caps and his final international was in April 1996, a friendly against Bosnia and Herzegovina, where he kept a clean sheet in a goalless draw.

== Managerial career ==
Kapllani began his managerial career in 2010 as head coach of Sukthi in the Albanian third tier, Kategoria e Dytë. In his second season in charge, he came close to achieving direct promotion to Kategoria e Parë, but the team failed to secure the required win against Tërbuni, resulting in qualification for the promotion play-off instead. In the promotion play-off, Sukthi lost 3–0 away to Himara, missing promotion. Kapllani also served as assistant coach at Teuta in 2016.

== Personal life ==
He is the elder brother of fellow footballer Edmond Kapllani, who played as a striker in Germany and for the Albania national team. He is also the father of footballer Dejvid Kapllani, who played for Teuta during the 2020–21 Kategoria Superiore title-winning season.

== Career statistics ==
=== Club ===
Appearances and goals by club, season and competition
Club	Season	League			Cup		Europe		Total	
Club	Season	Division	Apps	Goals	Apps	Goals	Apps	Goals	Apps	Goals
Teuta	1991–92	Albanian Superliga	12	0	—		—		12	0
Teuta	1992–93	Albanian Superliga	27	0	—		—		27	0
Teuta	1993–94	Albanian Superliga	15	0	—		—		15	0
Teuta	1994–95	Albanian Superliga	29	0	—		1	0	30	0
Teuta	1995–96	Albanian Superliga	33	0	—		4	0	37	0
Teuta	Total		116	0	—		5	0	121	0
Lushnja	1996–97	Albanian Superliga	17	0	—		—		17	0
Dinamo Tirana	1997–98	Albanian Superliga	16	0	—		—		16	0
Dinamo Tirana	1998–99	Albanian Superliga	6	0	—		—		6	0
Dinamo Tirana	Total		22	0	—		—		22	0
Teuta	1998–99	Albanian Superliga	23	0	—		—		23	0
Partizani	1999–2000	Albanian Superliga	11	0	—		—		11	0
Shqiponja Gjirokastër	1999–2000	Albanian Superliga	13	0	—		—		13	0
Shqiponja Gjirokastër	2000–01	Albanian Superliga	19	0	—		—		19	0
Shqiponja Gjirokastër	Total		32	0	—		—		32	0
Erzeni Shijak	2001–02	Albanian Superliga	22	0	—		—		22	0
Erzeni Shijak	2002–03	Albanian Superliga	24	0	—		—		24	0
Erzeni Shijak	Total		46	0	—		—		46	0
Bashkimi	2003–04	Macedonian First League	5	0	—		—		5	0
Besa Kavajë	2003–04	Albanian Superliga	16	0	—		—		16	0
Teuta	2004–05	Albanian Superliga	29	1	—		—		29	1
Teuta	2005–06	Albanian Superliga	35	0	—		2	0	37	0
Teuta	2006–07	Albanian Superliga	26	0	—		—		26	0
Teuta	2007–08	Albanian Superliga	22	0	—		2	0	24	0
Teuta	Total		122	1	—		4	0	126	1
Career total			400	1	0	0	9	0	409	1

=== International ===
Appearances and goals by national team and year
National team	Year	Apps	Goals
Albania	1993	2	0
Albania	1994	1	0
Albania	1995	1	0
Albania	1996	1	0
Total		5	0

== Honours ==
Teuta

- Albanian Superliga: 1993–94
- Albanian Cup: 1994–95 and 2004–05
