= Shehu (surname) =

Origin
- Meaning: Elder, Sheikh (Arabic: شَيْخ, romanized: shaykh)

Shehu is an Albanian surname that comes from the religious title Sheikh. It is the second most common surname in Albania and the 71st most common surname in Kosovo. "Shehu" may refer to:

- Ajet Shehu (born 1990), English retired footballer
- Aqif Shehu (???), Kosovar-Albanian politician
- Arben Shehu (born 1967), Albanian footballer
- Arben Shehu (born 1980), Albanian football player
- Bashkim Shehu (born 1955), Albanian writer
- Bashkim Shehu (born 1955), Albanian writer
- Emiljano Shehu (born 1998), Albanian footballer
- Enver Shehu (1934–2009), Albanian football player and manager
- Feçor Shehu (1926–1983), Albanian communist politician
- Ferbent Shehu (1933–2011), Albanian dancer and choreographer
- Fiqrete Shehu (1919–1988), Albanian communist politician
- Hadi Shehu (1949–2017), Kosovar-Albanian actor
- Ismet Shehu (???), Albanian chef
- Juljan Shehu (born 1998), Albanian footballer
- Mefail Shehu (1898–1945), Albanian Balli Kombëtar military commander
- Mehmet Shehu (1913–1981), Albanian communist politician
- Ramadan Shehu (born 1948), Albanian football coach
- Ylli Shehu (born 1966), Albanian footballer
- Ylli Vesel Shehu (born 1981), Albanian lawyer and parliamentarian
