= 1995–96 Albanian National Championship =

Albanian National Championship
- Season: 1995–96
- Champions: Tirana; 16th Albanian title
- Relegated: Kastrioti; Besëlidhja
- Champions League: None
- UEFA Cup: Tirana; Teuta
- Cup Winners' Cup: Flamurtari
- Matches: 306
- Goals: 683 (2.23 per match)
- Top goalscorer: Altin Çuko (21 goals)

The 1995–96 Albanian National Championship was the 57th season of the Albanian National Championship, the top professional league for association football clubs, since its establishment in 1930.

== Teams ==
=== Stadia and last season ===
Locations of the 1995–96 Albanian National Championship teams

Team	Location	Stadium	Capacity	Last season
Albpetrol	Patos	Alush Noga Stadium	2,150	6th
Apolonia	Fier	Loni Papuçiu Stadium	10,000	10th
Besa	Kavajë	Besa Stadium	8,000	15th
Besëlidhja	Lezhë	Brian Filipi Stadium	5,000	13th
Elbasani	Elbasan	Ruzhdi Bizhuta Stadium	15,000	12th
Flamurtari	Vlorë	Flamurtari Stadium	15,000	4th
Kastrioti	Krujë	Kastrioti Stadium	3,500	Kategoria e Dytë
Laçi	Laç	Laçi Stadium	5,000	14th
Olimpik	Tirana	Qemal Stafa Stadium (Note: Olimpik, Partizani and Tirana all shared the Qemal Stafa Stadium as well as the Selman Stërmasi Stadium.)	19,700	8th
Partizani	Tirana	Qemal Stafa Stadium	19,700	3rd
Skënderbeu	Korçë	Skënderbeu Stadium	12,000	Kategoria e Dytë
Sopoti	Librazhd	Sopoti Stadium	3,000	Kategoria e Dytë
Shkumbini	Peqin	Shkumbini Stadium	6,000	7th
Shqiponja	Gjirokastër	Gjirokastër Stadium	9,000	15th
Teuta	Durrës	Niko Dovana Stadium	12,040	2nd
Tirana	Tirana	Qemal Stafa Stadium	19,700	Champions
Tomori	Berat	Tomori Stadium	14,750	9th
Vllaznia	Shkodër	Loro Boriçi Stadium	15,000	11th

== League table ==
Pos	Team	Pld	W	D	L	GF	GA	GD	AW	Pts	Qualification or relegation
1	Tirana (C)	34	19	10	5	52	22	+30	7	55	Qualification for the UEFA Cup preliminary round
2	Teuta	34	20	10	4	50	22	+28	4	54	Qualification for the UEFA Cup preliminary round
3	Partizani	34	16	9	9	43	24	+19	5	46	
4	Flamurtari	34	17	6	11	42	35	+7	5	45	Qualification for the Cup Winners' Cup qualifying round
5	Olimpik	34	15	8	11	42	30	+12	3	41	
6	Apolonia	34	12	9	13	46	44	+2	4	37	
7	Besa	34	12	9	13	29	31	−2	2	35	
8	Sopoti	34	11	9	14	35	47	−12	3	34	
9	Shkumbini	34	12	9	13	43	40	+3	0	33	
10	Vllaznia	34	9	13	12	30	36	−6	1	32	
11	Albpetrol	34	12	7	15	30	48	−18	1	32	
12	Laçi	34	13	4	17	49	53	−4	1	31	
13	Elbasani	34	10	10	14	35	41	−6	1	31	
14	Tomori	34	11	9	14	34	40	−6	0	31	
15	Shqiponja	34	11	6	17	34	41	−7	3	31	
16	Skënderbeu	34	13	3	18	35	49	−14	2	31	
17	Kastrioti (R)	34	11	6	17	30	40	−10	2	30	Relegation to the 1996–97 Kategoria e Dytë
18	Besëlidhja (R)	34	9	9	16	24	40	−16	0	27	Relegation to the 1996–97 Kategoria e Dytë

Source: RSSSF.org
Rules for classification: 2 points for a home win, 3 points for an away win, 1 points for a draw
(C) Champions; (R) Relegated

Note 2: 'Olimpik' is Dinamo Tirana, 'Shqiponja' is Luftëtari

== Results ==
Home \ Away	ALB	APO	BES	BSL	ELB	FLA	KAS	LAÇ	OLI	PAR	SKË	SOP	SKU	SHQ	TIR	TEU	TOM	VLL
Albpetrol		0–0	3–0	1–1	1–0	0–0	1–0	2–1	1–0	0–0	5–1	1–0	2–1	0–2	0–0	2–1	2–1	2–1
Apolonia	0–0		1–1	3–0	3–1	0–1	2–0	0–0	1–0	0–1	0–1	3–2	7–1	2–1	2–1	1–1	1–1	2–2
Besa	1–0	2–2		4–0	2–1	1–0	2–0	1–0	0–1	2–0	0–1	0–0	1–0	0–1	1–0	0–0	2–1	2–2
Besëlidhja	2–0	0–2	3–1		1–0	0–0	1–0	0–1	0–1	1–0	2–0	1–1	5–4	0–1	0–1	1–0	1–0	0–0
Elbasani	1–0	2–1	1–0	2–0		3–0	1–0	6–5	2–2	0–0	1–0	1–1	0–0	2–0	0–0	0–0	2–2	0–1
Flamurtari	1–0	3–0	3–2	1–0	2–1		0–1	3–1	0–0	0–0	5–1	1–2	1–0	3–0	2–0	0–1	1–0	3–0
Kastrioti	2–1	0–2 (Note: Match awarded.)	2–0	1–0	1–1	1–0		2–0	1–1	0–1	1–0	0–2	0–0	1–0	0–0	2–1	2–1	2–2
Laçi	0–0	3–2	0–1	1–1	4–1	4–0	2–1		2–0	3–0	1–0	2–0	5–3	1–0	2–3	3–3	3–1	2–0
Olimpik	5–1	2–0	2–1	1–1	3–0	2–0	1–0	4–0		2–1	4–2	5–0	1–0	0–0	0–1	0–0	1–0	0–0
Partizani	6–0	6–1	0–0	0–0	0–2	0–0	4–2	3–0	1–0		3–0	3–1	3–1	3–1	0–2	1–0	2–1	0–0
Skënderbeu	3–1	2–1	0–1	2–1	2–0	0–1	1–0	2–1	3–0	1–0		0–1	2–0	4–1	1–1	0–1	0–0	1–0
Sopoti	1–0	1–0	1–1	1–0	1–1	4–5	2–1	2–0	0–0	0–0	1–0		0–0	4–2	0–1	0–1	4–1	0–0
Shkumbini	4–0	3–0	2–0	0–0	1–0	2–2	2–1	2–1	3–0	0–1	4–1	2–1		3–1	0–0	0–0	2–0	1–0
Shqiponja	4–1	1–3	0–0	1–0	0–0	0–1	0–1	1–0	0–2	1–2	2–1	5–0	1–0		0–1	0–0	3–0	2–0
Tirana	5–1	2–0	1–0	4–0	2–1	3–0	1–1	2–0	3–1	1–2	3–1	4–1	1–0	1–1		1–1	1–1	4–1
Teuta	1–0	1–1	2–0	1–0	2–1	3–1	4–2	3–0	3–0	1–0	3–1	3–1	2–1	3–1	2–0		1–0	3–1
Tomori	2–0	1–3	1–0	1–1	2–0	2–0	2–1	2–0	2–1	1–0	1–1	1–0	1–1	2–1	0–0	1–2		1–0
Vllaznia	1–2	1–0	0–0	4–1	2–1	1–2	2–1	2–1	1–0	0–0	3–0	2–0	0–0	0–0	0–2	0–0	1–1	

Source: RSSSF.org
Legend: Blue = home team win; Yellow = draw; Red = away team win.

== Season statistics ==
=== Top scorers ===
Rank	Player	Club	Goals
1	(Albania) Altin Çuko	Tomori/Laçi	21
2	(Albania) Shpëtim Kateshi	Shkumbini	19
3	(Albania) Alket Zeqo	Apolonia	16
3	(Albania) Arben Shehu	Shqiponja	16
5	(Albania) Luan Brasha	Sopoti	14
5	(Albania) Elton Koça	Teuta	14
7	(Albania) Hekuran Jakupi	Elbasani	13
8	(Albania) Artan Çiçiku	Laçi	12
9	(Albania) Roland Zajmi	Olimpik/Partizani	11
10	(Albania) Artan Bare	Apolonia	9
10	(Albania) Saimir Malko	Tirana	9
