= Ismatullah =

Ismatullah, Esmatullah and Asmatullah (Arabic: عصمة الله) are all spelling variants of the same Muslim male given name, formed from the elements Ismat and Allah. it may refer to

- Asmatullah Rohani, Afghan judge
- Esmatullah Muhabat (died 2005), Afghan politician
- Ismatullah (Bagram detainee)
- Ismatullah Muslim (died 1991), Afghan militia leader
- Muhammad Hashim Esmatullahi, Afghan journalist
