= 1993–94 Kategoria e Dytë =

Kategoria e Dytë
- Season: 1993–94
- Champions: Shqiponja
- Promoted: Shqiponja; Iliria; Tomori; Shkumbini
- Relegated: 18 clubs

The 1993–94 Kategoria e Dytë was the 47th season of a second-tier association football league in Albania.

== Second Division-1 ==
=== Group A ===
Pos	Team	Pld	W	D	L	GF	GA	GD	Pts	Promotion or qualification
1	Shqiponja (C, P)	12	10	0	2	28	9	+19	20	Promotion to 1994–95 National Championship
2	Pogradeci	12	9	1	2	25	9	+16	19	Qualification to the Promotion playoff
3	Butrinti	12	6	1	5	23	15	+8	13	
4	Skënderbeu	12	5	1	6	20	17	+3	11	
5	Përmeti	12	4	1	7	8	17	−9	9	
6	Bylis	12	3	2	7	11	23	−12	8	
7	Gramozi	12	1	2	9	11	36	−25	4	

(C) Champions; (P) Promoted

=== Group B ===
Pos	Team	Pld	W	D	L	GF	GA	GD	Pts	Promotion or relegation (Note: Errors in table: 47 total wins != 46 total losses and 15 total draws is an odd number)
1	Iliria (P)	14	10	2	2	24	4	+20	22	Promotion to 1994–95 National Championship
2	Tomori	14	10	1	3	28	9	+19	21	Qualification to the Promotion playoff
3	Kastrioti	14	9	3	2	24	9	+15	21	
4	Veleçiku (R)	14	7	3	4	25	10	+15	17	Relegation to 1994–95 Kategoria e Tretë
5	Burreli	13	4	2	7	19	26	−7	10	
6	Naftëtari	13	4	2	7	22	34	−12	10	
7	Studenti (R)	13	3	1	9	6	23	−17	7	Relegation to 1994–95 Kategoria e Tretë
8	Minatori (Note: Minatori were withdraw after 7th round; the rest of matches all 0–2 by FSHF decision.)	13	0	1	12	4	37	−33	1	

(P) Promoted; (R) Relegated

=== Final ===
Team 1	Score	Team 2
Shqiponja	2–0	Iliria

== Second Division-2 ==
=== Burrel Group ===
Team	Location
Vëllazërimi	Mamurras
Korabi	Peshkopi
Martaneshi	Martanesh
Tërbuni	Pukë
Valbona	Bajram Curri

Vëllazërimi won the group and qualified to the promotion playoff

=== Elbasan Group ===
Team	Location
Shkumbini	Peqin
Gramshi	Gramsh
Romët	Fushë-Krujë
Turbina	Cërrik
Vau i Dejës	Vau i Dejës

Shkumbini won the group and qualified to the promotion playoff

=== Sarandë Group ===
Team	Location
Bistrica	Delvinë
Poliçani	Poliçan
Skrapari	Çorovodë

Bistrica won the group and qualified to the promotion playoff

=== Tirana Group ===
Team	Location
Erzeni	Shijak
AUT “Skënderbeu”	Tirana
Amaro Divas Romët	Tirana
Dajti	Kamëz
Piramida	Vorë
Vora	Vorë

Erzeni won the group and qualified to the promotion playoff

== Promotion/relegation playoff ==
=== First round ===
Team 1	Score	Team 2
Sopoti	0–1	Erzeni
Vëllazërimi	1–6	Tomori
Shkumbini	1–0	Lushnja
Bistrica	1–2	Pogradeci

- Sopoti and Lushnja were relegated to 1994–95 Kategoria e Dytë.

=== Second round ===
Team 1	Score	Team 2
Tomori	4–2	Erzeni
Shkumbini	1–0	Pogradeci

- Tomori and Shkumbini were promoted to 1994–95 National Championship.

== Note ==
- Akademia Ushtarake Tokësore “Skënderbeu”, Amaro Divas Romët, Bistrica, Dajti, Erzeni, Gramshi, Martaneshi, Piramida, Poliçani, Romët, Skrapari, Studenti, Tërbuni, Valbona, Vau i Dejës, Veleçiku, Vëllazërimi and Vora were relegated because were failed to secure a proper ground for next season.
