= 1936 in Albanian football =

Football in Albania
- Season: 1936

Men's football
- Albanian National Championship: Tirana
- Kategoria e Dytë: Bardhyli Lezhë

The 1936 season was the sixth competitive association football season in Albania. This was a return season, after no competition was played in 1935.

== League competitions ==
=== Albanian National Championship ===
The 1936 Albanian National Championship season began on 5 April and ended on 12 July. Tirana won their fifth title.

Pos	Team	Pld	W	D	L	GF	GA	GR	Pts
1	Tirana (C)	14	11	3	0	50	8	6.250	25
2	Vllaznia	14	10	3	1	27	12	2.250	23
3	Besa	14	4	5	5	21	22	0.955	13
4	Skënderbeu	14	5	4	5	20	18	1.111	14
5	Durrësi	14	3	5	6	14	19	0.737	11
6	Dragoj	14	4	1	9	11	31	0.355	9
7	Ismail Qemali	14	3	3	8	14	35	0.400	9
8	Bashkimi Elbasanas	14	3	2	9	12	24	0.500	8

Source: RSSSF.org
Rules for classification: 1) points; 2) goal difference; 3) number of goals scored.
(C) Champions

=== Kategoria e Dytë ===
Bardhyli Lezhë were champions of the 1936 Kategoria e Dytë.

Pos	Team	Pld	W	D	L	GF	GA	GR	Pts
1	Bardhyli Lezhë	2	2	0	0	11	2	5.500	4
2	Leka i Madh Permet	2	1	0	1	5	7	0.714	2
3	Shkumbini Peqin	2	0	0	2	0	7	0.000	0
