= 1933 in Albanian football =

Football in Albania
- Season: 1933

Men's football
- Albanian National Championship: Skënderbeu
- Kategoria e Dytë: Bashkimi Elbasan

The 1933 season was the fourth competitive association football season in Albania.

== League competitions ==
=== Albanian National Championship ===
The 1933 Albanian National Championship season began on 2 April and ended on 11 June. Skënderbeu Korçë won their first title, ending Tirana's three consecutive titles since the inauguration in 1930.

| Pos | Team | Pld | W | D | L | GF | GA | GR | Pts |
|---|---|---|---|---|---|---|---|---|---|
| 1 | Skënderbeu (C) | 8 | 5 | 2 | 1 | 18 | 6 | 3.000 | 12 |
| 2 | Bashkimi Shkodran | 8 | 5 | 0 | 3 | 14 | 9 | 1.556 | 10 |
| 3 | Teuta | 8 | 3 | 2 | 3 | 12 | 10 | 1.200 | 8 |
| 4 | Tirana | 8 | 3 | 2 | 3 | 14 | 12 | 1.167 | 8 |
| 5 | Kavaja | 8 | 1 | 0 | 7 | 5 | 26 | 0.192 | 2 |

Source: RSSSF.org
Rules for classification: 1) points; 2) goal difference; 3) number of goals scored.
(C) Champions

=== Kategoria e Dytë ===
Bashkimi Elbasan were champions of the 1933 Kategoria e Dytë.

4 July 1933

| Bashkimi Elbasan | 0–2 | SK Vlorë |

11 July 1933

| Bashkimi Elbasan | ?–? | SK Vlorë |

Both games were annulled and a rematch was scheduled

==== Rematch ====
13 August 1933

| Bashkimi Elbasan | 3 – 2 | SK Vlorë |
|---|---|---|
| Bizhuta; Biçaku; B.Jolldashi |
