= KF Teuta B =

Albanian football club

- Full name: Klubi Futbollit Teuta Durrës B
- Nickname: Djemtë e Detit
- Founded: 2013; 13 years ago
- Ground: Niko Dovana Stadium, Durrës, Albania
- Capacity: 12,000
- President: Edmond Hasanbelliu
- Manager: Xhevair Kapllani
- Website: http://www.kfteuta.com
Home colours	Away colours

KF Teuta B is an Albanian football club based in Durrës. The club was founded in 2013 as the secondary team of Albanian Superliga side KF Teuta Durrës.

== History ==
The first Teuta Durrës on records was formed in 1920 ahead of the Albanian First Division season that was to take place. Teuta Durrës B were placed in Group A and competed against the B teams of SK Tirana, Bashkimi Shkodran, SK Elbasani and Skënderbeu Korçë, with SK Tirana B winning the first officially recognised reserves competition held in Albania.

The club was reformed in 2013 and officially joined the Albanian Third Division, the fourth and lowest tier of the Albanian Football Association leagues. In their debut season they finished top of their group and played KF Tirana B in the championship final, which they lost, but they still gained promotion to the Albanian Second Division.

== Staff ==
- President: Edmond Hasanbelliu
- Manager: Xhevahir Kapllani
