= 1994–95 Albanian Cup =

Kupa e Shqipërisë

Tournament details
- Country: Albania

Final positions
- Champions: Teuta
- Runners-up: Tirana

1994–95 Albanian Cup (Albanian: Kupa e Shqipërisë) was the forty-third season of Albania's annual cup competition. The football competition began in August 1994 with the First Round and ended in May 1995 with the Final match. The winners of the competition qualified for the 1995-96 first round of the UEFA Cup. Tirana were the defending champions, having won their eighth Albanian Cup last season. The cup was won by Teuta.

The rounds were played in a two-legged format similar to those of European competitions. If the aggregated score was tied after both games, the team with the higher number of away goals advanced. If the number of away goals was equal in both games, the match was decided by extra time and a penalty shootout, if necessary.

== First round ==
Games were played on August & September 1994

Team 1	Agg.	Team 2	1st leg	2nd leg
Shkumbini	0–3	Teuta	0–2 (w/o)	0–1
Kastrioti	1–6	Tirana	0–2	1–4
Bylis	0–8	Flamurtari	0–3	0–5
Kopliku	1–8	Vllaznia	1–4	0–4
Naftëtari	3–11	Albpetrol	2–6	1–5
Amaro Divas	1–7	Partizani	0–4	1–3
Rrësheni	0–5	Dinamo Tirana	0–1	0–4
Skënderbeu	1–7	Elbasani	0–3	1–4
Përmeti	3–7	Apolonia	0–1	3–6
Korabi	1–8	Besëlidhja	0–2	1–6
Pogradeci	0–2	Besa	0–1	0–1
Kukësi	1–5	Laçi	1–1	0–4
Butrinti	1–5	Shqiponja	1–3	0–2 (w/o)
Burreli	4–5	Iliria	2–1	2–4
Tomori	4–0	Lushnja	3–0	1–0
Gramozi	3–5	Sopoti	3–1	0–4

== Second round ==
All sixteen teams of the 1993–94 Superliga and First Division entered in this round. First and second legs were played in January 1995.

Team 1	Agg.	Team 2	1st leg	2nd leg
Elbasani	3–2	Besëlidhja	2–2	1–0
Apolonia	2–1	Albpetrol	1–0	1–1
Partizani	3–1	Laçi	2–1	1–0
Tirana	7–4	Sopoti	5–1	2–3
Teuta	3–2	Tomori	3–1	0–1
Flamurtari	3–2	Iliria	1–0	2–2
Dinamo Tirana	2–1	Besa	1–0	1–1
Vllaznia	1–1 (a)	Shqiponja	0–0	1–1

== Quarter-finals ==
In this round entered the 8 winners from the previous round.

Team 1	Agg.	Team 2	1st leg	2nd leg
Elbasani	1–4	Tirana	1–1	0–3
Apolonia	3–4	Teuta	2–1	1–3
Partizani	3–1	Vllaznia	2–0	1–1
Dinamo Tirana	2–2	Flamurtari	1–0	1–2

== Semi-finals ==
In this round entered the four winners from the previous round.

Team 1	Agg.	Team 2	1st leg	2nd leg
Tirana	2–0	Partizani	2–0	0–0
Teuta	3–1	Dinamo Tirana	3–0	0–1

== Final ==
31 May 1995
16:00

Teuta	0–0	Tirana
Penalties
Abazi (penalty scored); Koça (penalty missed); Alliu (penalty missed); Vila (penalty scored); Bushi (penalty missed); Qendro (penalty scored); Dobi (penalty scored)	4–3	(penalty scored) Minga; (penalty scored) Prenga; (penalty missed) Malko; (penalty missed) Fortuzi; (penalty missed) Mema; (penalty scored) Kola; (penalty missed) Baholli

Qemal Stafa Stadium, Tirana
Attendance: 12,000
Referee: Bujar Pregja
