= Vesel =

Vesel is a surname and a given name. Notable people with the name include:

== Given name ==
- Vesel Demaku (born 2000), professional footballer
- Vesel Limaj (born 1996), German professional footballer
- Ylli Vesel Shehu (born 1981), Member of the Assembly of Albania

== Surname ==
- Janez Vesel (1798–1884), (pen name Jovan Koseski), Slovene lawyer and poet
- Jessie Case Vesel (1855–1937), English painter
- Tomaž Vesel (born 1967), Slovenian lawyer, president of the Court of Audit 2013–2022

== See also ==
- Cimitirul Vesel, cemetery in the village of Săpânța, Maramureș County, Romania
