= 1994–95 Albanian National Championship =

Albanian National Championship
- Season: 1994–95
- Champions: Tirana; 15th Albanian title
- Relegated: Iliria
- Champions League: None
- UEFA Cup: Tirana; Partizani
- Cup Winners' Cup: Teuta
- Matches: 240
- Goals: 525 (2.19 per match)
- Top goalscorer: Arben Shehu (21 goals)

The 1994–95 Albanian National Championship was the 56th season of the Albanian National Championship, the top professional league for association football clubs, since its establishment in 1930.

== Teams ==
=== Stadia and last season ===
Locations of the 1994–95 Albanian National Championship teams

Team	Location	Stadium	Capacity	Last season
Albpetrol	Patos	Alush Noga Stadium	2,150	9th
Apolonia	Fier	Loni Papuçiu Stadium	10,000	7th
Besa	Kavajë	Besa Stadium	8,000	11th
Besëlidhja	Lezhë	Brian Filipi Stadium	5,000	10th
Dinamo Tirana	Tirana	Qemal Stafa Stadium (Note: Dinamo Tirana, Partizani and Tirana all shared the Qemal Stafa Stadium as well as the Selman Stërmasi Stadium.)	19,700	6th
Elbasani	Elbasan	Ruzhdi Bizhuta Stadium	15,000	8th
Flamurtari	Vlorë	Flamurtari Stadium	15,000	3rd
Iliria	Fushë-Krujë	Redi Maloku Stadium	3,000	Kategoria e Dytë
Laçi	Laç	Laçi Stadium	5,000	12th
Partizani	Tirana	Qemal Stafa Stadium	19,700	5th
Shkumbini	Peqin	Shkumbini Stadium	6,000	Kategoria e Dytë
Shqiponja	Gjirokastër	Gjirokastër Stadium	9,000	Kategoria e Dytë
Teuta	Durrës	Niko Dovana Stadium	12,040	Champions
Tirana	Tirana	Qemal Stafa Stadium	19,700	2nd
Tomori	Berat	Tomori Stadium	14,750	Kategoria e Dytë
Vllaznia	Shkodër	Loro Boriçi Stadium	15,000	4th

== League table ==
Pos	Team	Pld	W	D	L	GF	GA	GD	Pts	Qualification
1	Tirana (C)	30	19	6	5	57	27	+30	44	Qualification for the UEFA Cup preliminary round
2	Teuta	30	13	6	11	37	27	+10	32	Qualification for the Cup Winners' Cup qualifying round
3	Partizani	30	12	8	10	36	30	+6	32	Qualification for the UEFA Cup preliminary round
4	Flamurtari	30	11	10	9	34	29	+5	32	
5	Shqiponja	30	11	9	10	38	33	+5	31	
6	Albpetrol	30	13	5	12	37	43	−6	31	
7	Shkumbini	30	11	8	11	32	20	+12	30	
8	Dinamo Tirana	30	10	10	10	37	27	+10	30	
9	Tomori	30	12	6	12	21	25	−4	30	
10	Apolonia	30	12	6	12	33	38	−5	30	
11	Vllaznia	30	12	5	13	31	28	+3	29	
12	Elbasani	30	10	9	11	22	20	+2	29	
13	Besëlidhja	30	11	7	12	29	34	−5	29	
14	Laçi	30	13	3	14	30	40	−10	29	
15	Besa	30	12	2	16	29	40	−11	26	
16	Iliria (R)	30	7	2	21	22	64	−42	16	Qualification for the relegation play-offs

Source: RSSSF.org
(C) Champions; (R) Relegated

Note: 'Shqiponja' is Luftëtari

== Results ==
Home \ Away	ALB	APO	BES	BSL	DIN	ELB	FLA	ILI	LAÇ	PAR	SKU	SHQ	TEU	TIR	TOM	VLL
Albpetrol		0–1	1–0	2–1	1–0	0–1	3–1	1–0	1–0	4–3	1–1	1–1	1–0	2–3	3–0	1–0
Apolonia	0–3		2–0	1–1	0–0	1–0	1–0	2–0	1–0	0–0	1–1	1–0	3–2	1–2	2–0	2–0
Besa	3–1	2–1		1–1	1–0	1–0	1–0	1–0	4–0	2–1	1–0	1–1	1–2	0–1	1–0	1–0
Besëlidhja	1–0	2–0	1–0		5–1	1–0	2–2	2–0	1–0	0–2	1–0	4–0	0–0	1–1	1–0	0–0
Dinamo	0–1	0–2	4–0	1–0		1–1	2–1	8–1	3–0	1–1	0–0	0–0	1–0	2–1	3–3	4–1
Elbasani	0–1	0–0	2–1	3–0	0–0		0–0	2–0	0–0	0–1	2–0	3–1	1–0	1–1	1–0	2–0
Flamurtari	0–0	3–2	2–0	2–0	1–0	3–1		5–0	2–0	1–1	1–0	1–1	0–0	0–1	1–0	2–1
Iliria	4–3	3–5	0–1	1–1	0–1	1–0	1–0		2–1	1–3	0–3	1–0	3–2	1–2	0–0	1–0
Laçi	3–0	2–1	3–2	3–2	1–0	0–0	2–2	2–0		2–1	2–1	2–1	1–0	2–1	1–0	3–1
Partizani	3–1	3–1	2–1	0–1	0–0	1–0	1–1	2–1	2–0		0–0	1–2	3–0	2–1	1–2	1–1
Shkumbini	3–1	0–0	3–0	2–0	0–0	0–0	0–0	4–0	1–0	3–0		3–0	1–2	1–0	3–0	1–0
Shqiponja	1–1	2–1	3–1	2–0	1–0	0–1	4–1	4–1	4–0	2–0	1–0		3–0	1–2	1–1	0–0
Teuta	4–0	2–1	3–1	1–0	0–2	0–0	0–0	2–0	2–0	0–1	2–0	2–0		3–0	3–0	3–1
Tirana	6–1	4–0	3–1	3–0	3–3	2–1	2–0	5–0	3–0	1–0	3–1	2–2	1–1		1–0	1–0
Tomori	0–0	1–0	2–0	2–0	1–0	1–0	0–2	1–0	1–0	0–0	1–0	2–0	1–0	0–0		2–0
Vllaznia	3–2	5–0	1–0	4–0	1–0	3–0	3–0	1–0	1–0	1–0	1–0	0–0	1–1	0–1	1–0	

Source: RSSSF.org
Legend: Blue = home team win; Yellow = draw; Red = away team win.

== Relegation/promotion playoff ==
Team 1	Score	Team 2
Iliria	0–3	Lushnja
Sopoti	5–1	Iliria
Lushnja	0–4	Sopoti

Pos	Team	Pld	W	D	L	GF	GA	GD	Pts	Promotion or relegation
1	Sopoti (P)	2	2	0	0	9	1	+8	4	Promotion to the 1995–96 National Championship
2	Lushnja	2	1	0	1	3	4	−1	2	Remain in the 1995–96 Kategoria e Dytë
3	Iliria (R)	2	0	0	2	1	8	−7	0	Relegation to the 1995–96 Kategoria e Dytë

Source: RSSSF.org
(P) Promoted; (R) Relegated

== Season statistics ==
=== Top scorers ===
Rank	Player	Club	Goals
1	(Albania) Arben Shehu	Shqiponja	21
2	(Albania) Indrit Fortuzi	Tirana	18
3	(Albania) Andi Vuthi	Laçi	13
4	(Albania) Edmond Dalipi	Dinamo Tirana	11
4	(Albania) Anesti Vito	Flamurtari	11
4	(Albania) Elton Marini	Apolonia	11
7	(Albania) Agustin Kola	Tirana	10
7	(Albania) Agron Reçi	Besëlidhja	10
7	(Albania) Brikeno Bizi	Vllaznia	10
7	(Albania) Dashnor Poçi	Albpetrol	10
