= 1991–92 Albanian National Championship =

Albanian National Championship
- Season: 1991–92
- Champions: Vllaznia; 7th Albanian title
- Relegated: Selenica; Skënderbeu
- Champions League: None
- UEFA Cup: None
- Cup Winners' Cup: None
- Matches: 240
- Goals: 535 (2.23 per match)
- Top goalscorer: Edmir Bilali (20 goals)

The 1991–92 Albanian National Championship was the 53rd season of the Albanian National Championship, the top professional league for association football clubs, since its establishment in 1930. The season began on 21 September 1991 and concluded on 17 May 1992. Flamurtari began the season as defending champions of the 1990–91 season, with Laçi, Pogradeci and Selenica being promoted from the Kategoria e Dytë as the league was expanded from 14 to 16 teams and the total number of fixtures reduced for the 1991–92 season, as clubs faced each twice rather than 3 times.

Vllaznia won their 7th Albanian title, having finished 3rd the previous season, with the defending champions finishing 6th following a 6-point deduction. Skënderbeu were the first club to be relegated, with newly promoted side Selenica following them down to the Kategoria e Dytë.

== Teams ==
=== Promotion and relegation ===
A total of 16 teams competed in the 1991–92 season, 2 more than the previous where 14 teams competed. Of these 16 teams, 13 of them were from the 1990–91 season with Laçi, Pogradeci and Selenica being promoted from the Kategoria e Dytë. 2 sides from the 1991–92 season were relegated, and they were Skënderbeu
Selenica. Skënderbeu were the first to be relegated, and Selenica were subsequently relegated on goal difference as they finished level on points with Kastrioti.

=== Stadia and last season ===
Locations of the 1991–92 Albanian National Championship teams

Team	Location	Stadium	Capacity	Last season
Apolonia	Fier	Loni Papuçiu Stadium	10,000	7th
Besa	Kavajë	Besa Stadium	8,000	11th
Dinamo Tirana	Tirana	Qemal Stafa Stadium (Note: Dinamo Tirana, Partizani and Tirana all shared the Qemal Stafa Stadium as well as the Selman Stërmasi Stadium.)	19,700	6th
Elbasani	Elbasan	Ruzhdi Bizhuta Stadium	15,000	9th
Flamurtari	Vlorë	Flamurtari Stadium	15,000	Champions
Kastrioti	Krujë	Kastrioti Stadium	10,000	12th
Laçi	Laç	Laçi Stadium	5,000	Kategoria e Dytë
Lushnja	Lushnjë	Abdurrahman Roza Haxhiu Stadium	12,000	13th
Partizani	Tirana	Qemal Stafa Stadium	19,700	2nd
Pogradeci	Pogradec	Qemal Stafa Stadium	10,700	Kategoria e Dytë
Selenica	Selenicë	Selenicë Stadium	4,000	Kategoria e Dytë
Skënderbeu	Korçë	Skënderbeu Stadium	12,000	10th
Teuta	Durrës	Niko Dovana Stadium	12,040	8th
Tirana	Tirana	Qemal Stafa Stadium	19,700	4th
Tomori	Berat	Tomori Stadium	14,750	5th
Vllaznia	Shkodër	Loro Boriçi Stadium	15,000	3rd

== League table ==
Pos	Team	Pld	W	D	L	GF	GA	GD	Pts	Qualification or relegation
1	Vllaznia (C)	30	19	6	5	63	23	+40	44	Champions
2	Partizani	30	14	10	6	41	25	+16	38	
3	Teuta	30	12	9	9	30	20	+10	33	
4	Besa	30	13	7	10	42	36	+6	33	
5	Dinamo Tirana	30	9	13	8	32	22	+10	31	
6	Flamurtari (Note: Flamurtari were deducted six points.)	30	13	9	8	37	31	+6	29	
7	Lushnja	30	8	13	9	22	26	−4	29	
8	Tirana	30	11	6	13	38	32	+6	28	
9	Tomori	30	8	12	10	34	31	+3	28	
10	Apolonia (Note: Apolonia were deducted two points.)	30	11	8	11	33	34	−1	28	
11	Elbasani	30	10	8	12	28	29	−1	28	
12	Laçi	30	8	12	10	22	27	−5	28	
13	Pogradeci	30	7	13	10	28	39	−11	27	
14	Kastrioti	30	11	5	14	37	56	−19	27	
15	Selenica (R)	30	10	7	13	33	54	−21	27	Relegation to the 1992–93 Kategoria e Dytë
16	Skënderbeu (R)	30	3	8	19	15	50	−35	14	Relegation to the 1992–93 Kategoria e Dytë

Source: RSSSF.org
(C) Champions; (R) Relegated

== Results ==
Home \ Away	APO	BES	DIN	ELB	FLA	KAS	LAÇ	LUS	PAR	POG	SEL	SKË	TEU	TIR	TOM	VLL
Apolonia		2–3	2–1	0–2	2–1	4–0	2–1	1–0	1–1	2–2	3–1	1–1	1–0	1–0	0–0	0–2
Besa	0–0		1–0	4–1	1–0	0–1	0–0	4–1	3–2	1–2	8–1	2–0	0–0	1–0	2–1	0–4
Dinamo	0–0	2–1		1–1	1–2	7–0	2–0	0–0	2–1	0–0	3–0	2–0	0–1	1–0	0–2	0–3
Elbasani	1–0	0–1	0–0		2–0	1–0	1–0	1–1	1–1	2–0	3–0	1–1	1–2	1–0	1–1	0–1
Flamurtari	3–1	1–0	1–1	1–0		3–1	1–0	0–0	1–0	5–1	1–1	2–0	1–0	1–2	0–0	1–1
Kastrioti	0–0	4–1	1–0	2–1	0–0		1–3	2–0	0–2	0–2	1–1	6–1	1–0	1–4	2–1	1–1
Laçi	0–0	2–1	0–0	1–0	1–1	0–1		0–0	1–1	2–0	2–0	2–0	1–0	1–0	4–4	0–0
Lushnja	1–0	0–0	0–0	0–0	1–0	1–1	0–0		1–2	1–1	4–1	1–0	0–1	2–0	1–0	3–2
Partizani	2–0	0–0	1–1	2–1	3–0	4–0	0–0	2–0		1–1	1–0	3–0	0–0	1–3	0–0	1–0
Pogradeci	0–2	3–1	1–1	1–2	2–2	1–6	1–0	1–0	1–2		1–1	0–0	0–0	1–2	0–0	0–1
Selenica	3–1	1–2	0–4	2–0	3–3	1–0	3–0	2–0	0–1	1–1		2–0	1–0	0–5	2–1	0–0
Skënderbeu	0–2	0–1	0–1	1–2	2–0	2–0	0–0	0–1	0–1	1–2	0–1		2–1	1–1	0–0	0–2
Teuta	1–0	1–1	1–0	1–0	0–1	4–1	3–0	1–1	2–2	0–0	0–0	5–0		1–0	2–1	0–2
Tirana	2–3	2–0	1–1	1–0	0–2	3–0	2–0	1–1	2–1	0–1	2–4	2–2	0–0		0–0	0–3
Tomori	1–0	1–2	2–0	1–1	2–3	5–0	0–0	2–0	1–3	0–0	2–1	1–1	1–2	0–3		2–1
Vllaznia	5–2	3–1	0–0	3–1	3–0	3–4	3–1	1–1	3–0	3–2	5–0	5–0	2–1	1–0	0–2	

Source: CalcioMondialeWeb.it
Legend: Blue = home team win; Yellow = draw; Red = away team win.

== Season statistics ==
=== Top scorers ===
Rank	Player	Club	Goals
1	(Albania) Edmir Bilali	Vllaznia	20
2	(Albania) Kliton Bozgo	Tomori	18
3	(Albania) Dritan Hoxha	Selenica	16
3	(Albania) Altin Rraklli	Besa	16
5	(Albania) Edmond Dosti	Partizani	13
5	(Albania) Bashkim Shaqiri	Flamurtari	13
7	(Albania) Spartak Qosha	Kastrioti	12
8	(Albania) Genci Laçka	Pogradeci	10
8	(Albania) Artur Kallco	Teuta	10
8	(Albania) Ramiz Bisha	Vllaznia	10
