= Ilir Alliu =

Albanian footballer

Personal information
- Full name: Ilir Alliu
- Date of birth: 14 March 1973 (age 53)
- Place of birth: Hotolisht, Librazhd, Albania
- Height: 1.85 m (6 ft 1 in)
- Position: Defender

Senior career*
Years	Team	Apps	(Gls)
1992–1993	Tirana		
1993–1996	Teuta		
1996–2003	Flamurtari	8+	(0+)
2003	Elbasani	2	(0)

International career
1993	Albania U21	3	(0)
1995–1996	Albania	3	(0)
- * Club domestic league appearances and goals

Ilir Alliu (born 14 March 1973) is a former footballer who played for KF Tirana, Teuta Durrës, Flamurtari Vlorë, KF Elbasani as well as the Albania national team. He became the director of Sopoti Librazhd in March 2004 following his retirement but has since left the role.

== International career ==
He made his debut for Albania in an August 1995 friendly match against Malta and earned a total of 3 caps, scoring no goals. His final international was a November 1996 FIFA World Cup qualification match against Armenia in Tirana.

== Honours ==
Teuta

- Albanian National Championship (1): 1993–94
- Albanian Cup (1): 1994–95
