= 1994–95 Kategoria e Dytë =

Kategoria e Dytë
- Season: 1994–95
- Champions: Kastrioti
- Promoted: Kastrioti; Skënderbeu; Sopoti
- Relegated: Përparimi; Minatori

The 1994–95 Kategoria e Dytë was the 48th season of a second-tier association football league in Albania.

== Group A ==
Pos	Team	Pld	W	D	L	GF	GA	GD	Pts	Promotion or qualification
1	Skënderbeu (P)	16	10	3	3	43	17	+26	23	Promotion to 1995–96 National Championship
2	Sopoti (P)	16	10	2	4	46	20	+26	22	Qualification to the Promotion playoff
3	Pogradeci	16	10	0	6	24	18	+6	20	
4	Rrogozhinë	16	8	1	7	26	16	+10	17	
5	Butrinti	16	6	4	6	20	28	−8	16	
6	Turbina	16	6	2	8	17	21	−4	14	
7	Përmeti	16	7	0	9	17	31	−14	14	
8	Bylis	16	4	3	9	13	32	−19	11	
9	Gramozi	16	3	1	12	10	33	−23	7	

(P) Promoted

== Group B ==
Pos	Team	Pld	W	D	L	GF	GA	GD	Pts	Promotion or relegation
1	Kastrioti (C, P)	14	10	1	3	20	7	+13	21	Promotion to 1995–96 National Championship
2	Burreli (Note: Burreli were withdraw from the promotion playoff; Lushnja were placed instead.)	14	9	2	3	25	14	+11	20	
3	Lushnja	14	9	0	5	27	11	+16	18	Qualification to the Promotion playoff
4	Naftëtari	14	7	2	5	19	16	+3	16	
5	Korabi	14	7	2	5	21	19	+2	16	
6	Durrësi	14	5	1	8	12	25	−13	11	
7	Përparimi (Note: Përparimi were withdraw after 10th round; the rest of matches all 0–2 by FShF decision.) (R)	14	4	0	10	12	24	−12	8	Relegation to 1995–96 Kategoria e Tretë
8	Minatori (Note: Minatori were withdraw after 7th round; the rest of matches all 0–2 by FShF decision.) (R)	14	0	2	12	3	23	−20	2	Relegation to 1995–96 Kategoria e Tretë

(C) Champions; (P) Promoted; (R) Relegated

== Championship final ==
Team 1	Score	Team 2
Kastrioti	0–0 (3–2 p)	Skënderbeu

== Promotion/relegation playoff ==
Team 1	Score	Team 2
Iliria	0–3	Lushnja
Sopoti	5–1	Iliria
Lushnja	0–4	Sopoti

Pos	Team	Pld	W	D	L	GF	GA	GD	Pts	Promotion or relegation
1	Sopoti (P)	2	2	0	0	9	1	+8	4	Promotion to 1995–96 National Championship
2	Lushnja	2	1	0	1	3	4	−1	2	Remain in 1995–96 Kategoria e Dytë
3	Iliria (R)	2	0	0	2	1	8	−7	0	Relegation to 1995–96 Kategoria e Tretë

(P) Promoted; (R) Relegated
