= KF Tirana B =

Albanian football club

- Full name: Klubi i Futbollit Tirana B
- Founded: 22 January 2013; 13 years ago
- Ground: Skënder Halili Complex
- Capacity: 200
- Chairman: Refik Halili
- Manager: Gentian Muça
- League: Kategoria e Tretë, Group A
- 2025–26: Kategoria e Tretë, Group A, 4th
- Website: http://www.kftirana.al
Home colours	Away colours	Third colours

Klubi i Futbollit Tirana B is an Albanian football club based in Tirana. The club is the B team of Albania's most successful club KF Tirana. It was founded in 1932, but was dissolved before it was refounded on 22 January 2013.

== History ==
In 1932, ahead of the Albanian First Division campaign that was to take place, Sportklub Tiranë decided to put together a reserve team to participate in the first officially recognised reserves competition held in Albania. They competed in Group A along with reserve teams of Teuta Durrës, Bashkimi Shkodran, SK Elbasani and Skënderbeu Korçë. Sportklub Tiranë B, as the club was known at the time won the competition, but were not eligible to compete in the championship finals for the main Albanian First Division title and promotion to the Albanian Superliga. The following year the Albanian Football Association held the same competition, in which Sportklub Tiranë B won once again in the second and final year. The team dissolved in 1933 and the players either joined the youth team of Sportklub Tiranë or the first team. New B teams were recreated over the years, notably in 1980 where a team was recreated in order to compete in a friendly cup competition held by the Albanian Football Association, in which the team won.

On 22 January 2013, the first KF Tirana reserve team was founded as a result of a decision undertaken by the Municipality of Tirana to restructure the club's academy system and to improve the efficiency and image of the club. The team was formed to allow younger players to gain first team experience in the lower divisions of Albanian football, and also for first team players to prepare for first team games through featuring in reserve games as players from the first team, under-19s and under-17s are eligible to play for the B team. The club was registered to the Albanian Football Association on the same day as its foundation, and they competed in the Albanian Third Division in the 2012–13 season, which is the fourth and lowest tier of the Albanian Football Association competitions.

== Activity ==
The club's first manager was named former KF Tirana player Ardian Mema, who guided the club to a third-place finish in the 2012–13 Albanian Third Division campaign. The following season the club finished top of Group A and reached the championship final against Teuta Durrës B, in which they won 2–0 through a brace scored by Franci Kosova, which handed KF Tirana B their first officially recognised honour and promotion to the Albanian Second Division only one year after creation.

Since promotion, however, Tirana B have not been able to gain promotion to a higher division. This is due to the fact that the club has currently been focused on its first team and academy. This has resulted in it failing to circulate players of all abilities and not fulfilling the purpose of this secondary clubs creation.

== Stadium ==
KF Tirana plays most of its league and friendly games at the Selman Stërmasi stadium in Tirana. The Selman Stërmasi Stadium was built in 1956 and had been named the 'Dinamo' Stadium until 1991 when it was permanently given its new name. The Football Association of Albania and the club decided to name the stadium in 1991 after the eminent KF Tirana player, coach and president, Selman Stërmasi. The stadium has a capacity of 12,500 (of which 6,000 can be seated) and has ended a long phase of construction, involving development of the main pitch, central seated area, facilities around the ground and general lineaments. There are still improvements expected to be made soon. These include a side seated areas, an electronic clock and a KF Tirana shopping centre just under the central seating. The internal facilities include a press conference room, journalists' corner and modern showers. The main parking area is located at the front of the stadium, which leads to the entrance. The external part of the stadium is surrounded by a 9 ft rail fence.

== Honours ==
- Kategoria e Tretë
  - Winners (1): 2013–14
- Kategoria e Tretë Exhibition
  - Winners (2): 1932, 1933
- Albanian Football Association Cup
  - Winners (1): 1980

== Current squad ==
As of 22 March 2020

Note: Flags indicate national team as defined under FIFA eligibility rules; some limited exceptions apply. Players may hold more than one non-FIFA nationality.

No.	Pos.	Nation	Player
1	GK	ALB	Leon Kozi
2	DF	ALB	Xhoi Cici
3	DF	ALB	Malion Lami
4	DF	ALB	Kristi Malo
6	DF	ALB	Simone Marku
5	DF	ALB	Hilmi Likollari
7	MF	ALB	Aldi Gjumsi
8	MF	ALB	Okseold Sefa
9	FW	ALB	Mario Beshiraj
10	MF	ALB	Angelo Demaj
11	FW	ALB	Eldis Kraja
12	GK	ALB	Marvin Kodra
13	FW	ALB	Rigers Kokakushi
14	DF	GHA	Ibrahim Sulley

No.	Pos.	Nation	Player
16	MF	ALB	Eldi Gjuzi
17	DF	ALB	Miki Basha
20	DF	ALB	Arben Jaho
21	MF	ALB	Endi Biba
22	MF	ALB	Ergi Brahja
23	FW	ALB	Servet Dani
24	DF	ALB	Kleisi Skenderi
31	DF	CIV	Jocelin Behiratche
33	MF	ALB	Klajdi Aliaj
35	DF	ALB	Omar Musaj
38	GK	ALB	Erlind Derhemi
45	MF	ALB	Erjon Shima
91	MF	ALB	Flavjo Tarja
99	FW	ALB	Andri Stafa

== List of managers ==
- (Albania) Ardian Mema (22 January 2013 – 30 June 2013)
- (Albania) Ilir Muça (30 June 2013– 1 September 2015)
- (Albania) Krenar Alimehmeti (1 September 2015– 1 December 2016)
- (Albania) Migen Memelli (1 December 2016- 1 July 2017)
- (Albania) Krenar Alimehmeti (1 July 2017– 1 August 2018)
- (Albania) Alpin Gallo (1 August 2018– 1 November 2018)
- (Albania) Bekim Jakupi (1 November 2018 — 1 January 2019)
- (Albania) Johanes Tafaj (1 January 2019 — 11 November 2020 )
- (Albania) Arber Abilaliaj (12 November 2020 — 7 December 2020 )
- (Albania) Olsi Uku (12 December 2020 — 25 January 2021 )
- (Albania) Arber Abilaliaj (26 January 2021 — 30 June 2021 )
- (Albania) Erbim Fagu (1 July 2021 — 10 June 2022 )
- (Albania) Gentian Muca (1 August 2025 — )

== Current technical staff ==
- President: (Albania) Refik Halili
- Club Secretary (Albania) Grend Halili
- Head Coach: (Albania) Gentian Muca
- Academy (Albania) Vangjel Mile
- Goalkeeping Coach: (Albania) Alfred Osmani
- Physiotherapist: (Albania) Tedi Maqellari
- Physiotherapist: (Albania) Arzen Voci

== Recent seasons ==
Year	Division	Position
2012–13	Kategoria e Tretë	3
2013–14	Kategoria e Tretë	1
2014–15	Kategoria e Dytë	9
2015–16	Kategoria e Dytë	7
2016–17	Kategoria e Dytë	5
2017–18	Kategoria e Dytë	8
2018–19	Kategoria e Dytë	9
2019–20	Kategoria e Dytë	7
2025–26	Kategoria e Tretë	4
