= Durim Qypi Stadium =

- Përmet Stadium
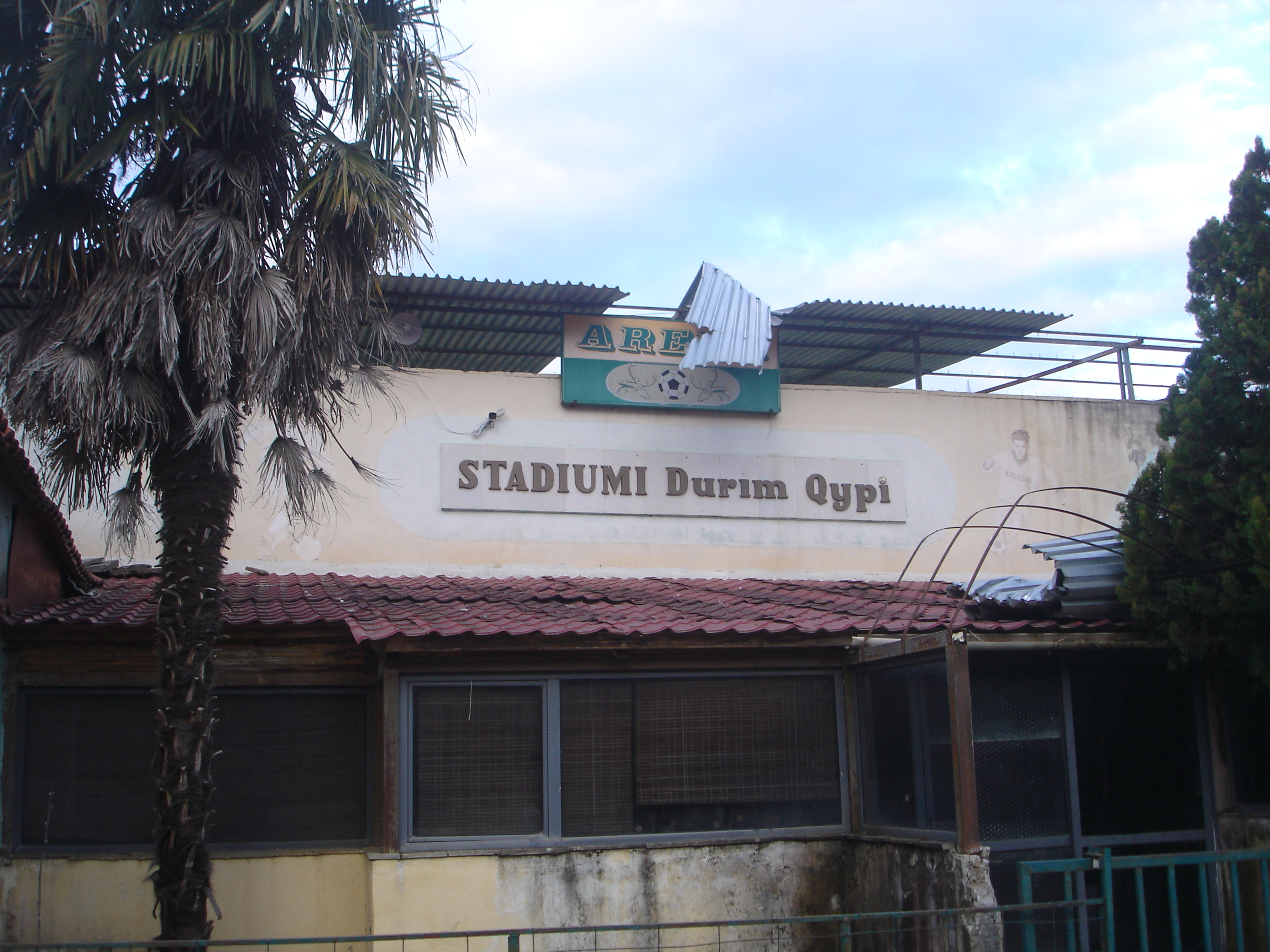
- Interactive map of Durim Qypi Stadium
- Location: Përmet, Gjirokastër County, Albania
- Coordinates: 40°14′11.4″N 20°21′25.9″E
- Owner: Municipality of Përmet
- Operator: Municipality of Përmet
- Capacity: 4,000 (2,000 seated)
- Surface: Grass

Tenant
- KF Përmeti

Durim Qypi Stadium (Albanian: Stadiumi Durim Qypi) is a multi-purpose stadium in Përmet, Albania. It is used for football matches and is the home ground of KF Përmeti. The stadium has an overall capacity of 4,000 spectators, 2,000 of which are seated.
