= Ismat =

Ismat/Esmat (Arabic: عصمت / اسمت or عصمة) is a given name meaning purity, chastity or modesty and in classical Arabic infallibility, immaculate, impeccability, faultlessness. Transliteration variants include Esmat and Asmat.

== Female given name ==
- Ismat Chughtai (1915–1991), Indian Urdu writer
- Esmat Dowlatshahi (1904–1995), Iranian aristocrat and the fourth and last spouse of Reza Shah
- Ismat Jahan (born 1960), Bangladeshi diplomat
- Esmat Mansour (born 1986), Egyptian weightlifter
- Ismat Ara Nishi, Bangladeshi Kabaddi player
- Aisha 'Esmat al-Taymuriyya or Aisha Taymur (1840–1902), Egyptian social activist, poet, novelist, and feminist
- Ismat Zaidi, Pakistani actress

== Male given name ==
- Ismat Abasov (born 1954), Azerbaijani politician
- Ismat Abdel-Rahman, Sudanese Army officer
- Ismat Beg, (born 1951), Pakistani mathematician
- Ismat Gayibov (1942–1991), Public Prosecutor General of Azerbaijan
- Ismat T. Kittani (1929–2001), Iraqi politician
- Esmat Shanwary (born 1993), Afghan-Dutch footballer

== Middle name ==
- Ahmed Asmat Abdel-Meguid (1924–2013), Egyptian diplomat
- Mohamed Anwar Esmat Sadat (born 1955), Egyptian politician

== Surname ==
- Riad Ismat (1947–2020), Syrian dramatist and playwright

== See also ==
- Ismet, Turkish spelling of the same name
- Ismat ad-Din (disambiguation)
- Ismatullah
