= 1932 Kategoria e Dytë =

Kategoria e Dytë
- Season: 1932
- Champions: SK Kavajë

The 1932 Kategoria e Dytë is the second season of the second tier of football in Albania. The league was played between April and May 1932 and it was divided into 3 groups, Group A being an exhibition tournament and the winners of Group B and C played each other in the final. The final was played between SK Kavajë and SK Vlorë, which was won by SK Kavajë 3-1 to be crowned champions.

== Group A ==
Team	Location
SK Tirana B	Tirana
SK Elbasan B	Elbasan
Bashkimi Shkodran B	Shkodër
Teuta Durrës B	Durrës
Skënderbeu Korçë B	Korçë

Played as an exhibition tournament which SK Tirana B won.

== Group B ==
Team	Location
Erzeni Shijak	Shijak
SK Fier	Fier
SK Kavajë	Kavajë
Kongresi i Lushnjës	Lushnjë
Muzaka Berat	Berat

SK Kavajë won the group

== Group C ==
Team	Location
Leka i Madh Permet	Permet
SK Narta	Nartë
Shqiponja Gjirokastër	Gjirokastër
SK Vlorë	Vlorë

SK Vlorë won the group

== Final ==
May 1932	SK Kavajë	3–1	SK Vlorë

== Winning team ==
SK Kavajë

- (Albania) Ymer Cara
- (Albania) Ali Cara
- (Albania) Dervish Cara
- (Albania) Mustafa Cara
- (Albania) Seit Shtini
- (Albania) Mehmet Babamusta
- (Albania) Dervish Arkaxhiu
- (Albania) Eqerem Sedja
- (Albania) Islam Sedja
- (Albania) Myslim Sedja
- (Albania) Hysen B
- (Albania) Kol Çuçja
- (Albania) Ali Djalja
- (Albania) Ymer Gjoçi
- (Albania) Hamdi Hasani
- (Albania) Idriz Hushi
- (Albania) Rexhep Kadiu
- (Albania) Mustafa Mërhori
- Coach: (Albania) Vasip Alushi
