= 1992–93 Kategoria e Dytë =

Kategoria e Dytë
- Season: 1992–93
- Champions: Besëlidhja
- Promoted: Besëlidhja
- Relegated: None

The 1992–93 Kategoria e Dytë was the 46th season of a second-tier association football league in Albania.

== First round ==
=== Group A ===
- KS Besëlidhja Lezhë (qualified to the semifinals)
- KS Burrel Mat
- KS Korabi Peshkopi
- KS Kopliku
- KS Kukësi
- KS Mamurrasi
- KS Puka
- KS Rrësheni
- KS Rubiku
- KS Valbona Bajram Curr

=== Group B ===
- KS Naftëtari Kuçovë (qualified to the semifinals)
- KS Amaro Divas Tiranë
- KS Dajti Tiranë
- KF Erzeni Shijak
- KS Iliria Fushë-Krujë
- KS Poliçani
- KS Skrapari Çorovodë
- KS Studenti Tiranë

Incomplete list

=== Group C ===
- KS Bylis Ballsh (qualified to the semifinals)
- KS Butrinti Sarandë
- KS Delvina
- KS Luftëtari Gjirokastër
- KS Përmet

Incomplete list

=== Group D ===
- KS Shkumbini Peqin (qualified to the semifinals)
- Akademia U.T. "Skënderbeu" Tiranë
- KS Cërriku
- KS Gramozi Ersekë
- KS Gramshi
- KS Skënderbeu Korçë

Incomplete list

== Second round ==
=== Semifinals ===
| Team 1 | Score | Team 2 |
|---|---|---|
| Besëlidhja | 0–0 (5–4 p) | Naftëtari |
| Shkumbini | 2–0 | Bylis |

=== Final ===
| Team 1 | Score | Team 2 |
|---|---|---|
| Besëlidhja | 2–0 (a.e.t.) | Shkumbini |

- Besëlidhja are promoted to 1993–94 National Championship.
