= 1996–97 Kategoria e Dytë =

Kategoria e Dytë
- Season: 1996–97
- Champions: Interrupted
- Promoted: None
- Relegated: Selenicë

The 1996–97 Kategoria e Dytë was the 50th season of a second-tier association football league in Albania.

The season was interrupted before the start of spring part of the season, due to the economic-political crisis in Albania in 1997.

== Group A ==
Pos	Team	Pld	W	D	L	GF	GA	GD	Pts	Relegation
1	Përmeti	11	9	1	1	21	4	+17	28	
2	Minatori	11	8	0	3	22	11	+11	24	
3	Plugu	11	6	1	4	20	17	+3	19	
4	Egnatia	11	6	1	4	16	13	+3	19	
5	Butrinti	11	5	2	4	16	17	−1	17	
6	Tepelena	11	5	0	6	19	21	−2	15	
7	Naftëtari	11	3	4	4	9	8	+1	13	
8	Bistrica	11	4	1	6	12	15	−3	13	
9	Turbina	11	4	1	6	13	17	−4	13	
10	Gramozi	11	3	2	6	11	17	−6	11	
11	Pogradeci	11	3	1	7	17	27	−10	10	
12	Selenicë (R)	11	2	2	7	16	25	−9	8	Relegation to 1997–98 Kategoria e Tretë

(R) Relegated

== Group B ==
Pos	Team	Pld	W	D	L	GF	GA	GD	Pts
1	Burreli	11	10	0	1	25	4	+21	30
2	Kastrioti	11	9	1	1	31	8	+23	28
3	Besëlidhja	11	6	2	3	21	12	+9	20
4	Erzeni	11	6	1	4	20	15	+5	19
5	Korabi	11	5	2	4	11	10	+1	17
6	Albanët	11	4	4	3	15	12	+3	16
7	Iliria	11	4	1	6	19	18	+1	13
8	Përparimi	11	3	3	5	10	13	−3	12
9	Durrësi	11	3	2	6	9	18	−9	11
10	Stërbeqi	10	2	3	5	11	18	−7	9
11	Porto Shëngjin	10	2	0	8	7	19	−12	6
12	Amaro Divas Romët	11	0	3	8	7	39	−32	3
