= Asmatullah Rohani =

Afghan judge and humanist activist

Asmatullah Rohani عصمت الله روحاني
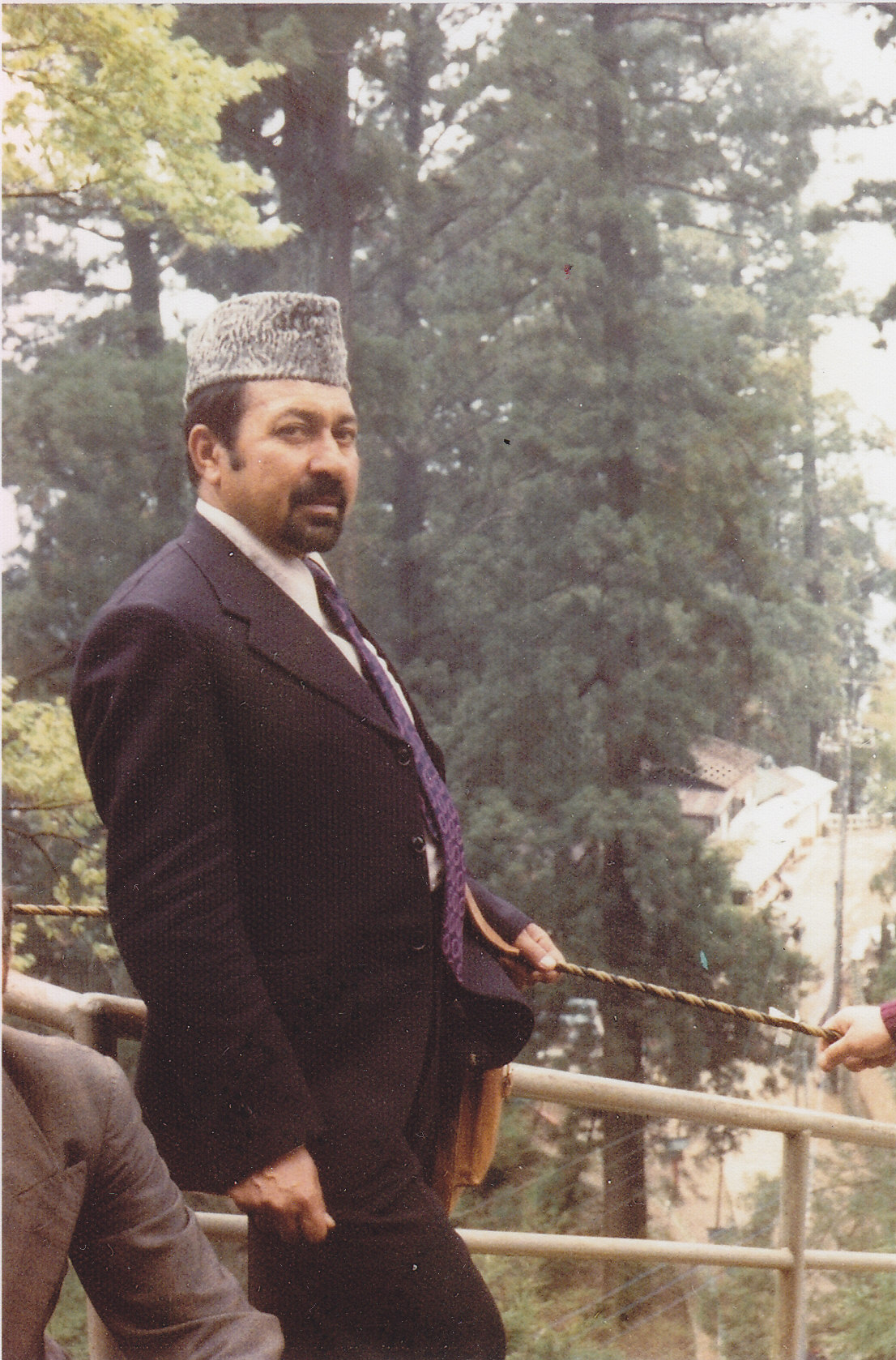
- Born: 3 August 1937; Balkh, Kingdom of Afghanistan
- Died: 24 September 2017 (aged 80); Guelph, Canada
- Occupation: Judge

Asmatullah Rohani (August 3, 1937 – September 24, 2017) was an Afghan judge, educator, and advocate for human rights, democracy, and social justice. Over the course of his career, he held senior judicial and academic positions in Afghanistan and later became involved in international legal and human rights initiatives. He also authored several books in Pashto, reflecting on legal, political, and cultural issues related to Afghanistan.

== Early life and education ==
Born on August 3, 1937, in Afghanistan, Rohani was the son of Hamdullah, a respected judge in Mazar-e Sharif. His family belonged to the Yousafzai tribe, originally from Kunar Province in eastern Afghanistan. Rohani began his education at Shiah Koat Ahdad Primary School in Nangarhar Province. In 1950, he enrolled at Madrassah Imam Abu Hanifa in Kabul, one of the country’s leading Islamic institutions. After graduating in 1957, he continued his studies at Kabul University, earning a Bachelor of Arts degree in Islamic Law in 1961. Pursuing higher education abroad, Rohani traveled to Australia in 1972 on a scholarship to study international law, and later, in 1976, he went to Japan for further academic advancement.

== Judicial and academic career ==
Upon returning to Afghanistan, Rohani joined the Ministry of Justice, serving as a judge at the Supreme Court (Pashto: ستره محکمه). He was later appointed as Director of the Supreme Court in Paktika Province. Alongside his judicial duties, he lectured part-time at the Faculty of Islamic Law at Kabul University, mentoring a generation of Afghan law students.

== Human rights work and exile ==
In 1980, Rohani joined the National Committee for Human Rights, where he documented widespread human rights violations committed under the Nur Muhammad Taraki regime and by Soviet forces during their occupation of Afghanistan. His commitment to justice made him a target; in 1987, he survived an assassination attempt that left him hospitalized in Kabul. Following this attack, Rohani and his wife fled Afghanistan on foot through the mountains, eventually finding refuge in Pakistan, where their children had already settled in Peshawar. There, he became an active member of the Writers’ Union of Free Afghanistan and authored a book detailing his experiences and observations of the Afghan conflict.

== International engagement and advocacy ==
In 1988, Rohani was invited by the U.S. government to visit Washington, D.C., where he met with members of the U.S. Congress to discuss Afghanistan’s political future. During his visit, he also appeared on Voice of America to speak about his country’s struggles for freedom and democracy. After returning to Peshawar, he was appointed Director of the Free Lawyers Association of Afghanistan. In 1991, he accepted an invitation from the South Korean government to attend the Second Conference of the Presidents of Bar Associations in Asia. There, he gave several interviews on Korean television, urging the international community to assist Afghanistan in rebuilding after the Soviet withdrawal.

== Later life and legacy ==
Rohani emigrated to Canada in the early 1990s, where he continued his intellectual and literary work. He remained active in the Afghan diaspora community and focused on documenting cultural, legal, and political themes from his homeland. During this period, he also authored and published multiple books in the Pashto language including Rohani Palwashi and Rohani Salghai, both of which reflect his lifelong commitment to education, justice, and Afghan cultural preservation. He also occasionally gave speeches at various engagements, participated in community events, and remained a respected voice on issues concerning Afghanistan, particularly in the areas of legal reform, human rights, and the rule of law. Asmatullah Rohani died on September 24, 2017, in Guelph, Ontario, Canada.

== Published works ==
- Rohani Selgie (روحاني سلگی)
- Rohani Palwashi (روحانی پلوشې)
- Rohani Rana aw Manawi Shkula (روحانی رڼا او معنوی ښکلا)
- Jihad Fi Sabilillah (جہاد فی سبیل اللہ)

== References and further reading ==
- Da Leekwalo Leekane | SCPRD.COM (archived December 31, 2010)
- "Yusufzai – Jihad-Fi-Sabilellah [Pashto], edited by Asmatullah Rohani Yusufzai" (archived July 27, 2011)
- Ashian Cultural, Social & Family Magazine for the Afghan Community in North America, Vol. 2, No. 25, pp. 30–31, Ashian Graphics & Publications, Toronto, May 2005
- Guelph Public Library: Asmatullah Rohani Collection
