= Edmir Bilali =

Albanian footballer (born 1970)

Personal information
- Date of birth: 23 August 1970 (age 56)
- Place of birth: Albania
- Height: 1.84 m (6 ft 0 in)
- Position: Forward

Senior career*
Years	Team	Apps	(Gls)
1991–1993	Vllaznia	41	(25)
1993–1994	Freiburger FC	31	(2)
1997–1998	FC Steinen-Höllstein	27	(2)
1998–2010	Emmendingen		
- * Club domestic league appearances and goals

Edmir Bilali (born 29 August 1970) is an Albanian retired footballer who played as a forward and spent most of his career in Germany.

== Club career ==
Bilali played in Albania with Vllaznia Shkodër. He is best known for winning the Albanian Superliga Golden Boot, scoring 21 goals during the 1995-96 campaign, 5 with Tomori Berat and 16 with Laçi.

== External sources ==
- Edmir Bilali at WorldFootball.net
