= Ismet Azizi =

Kosovan professor and journalist (born 1960)

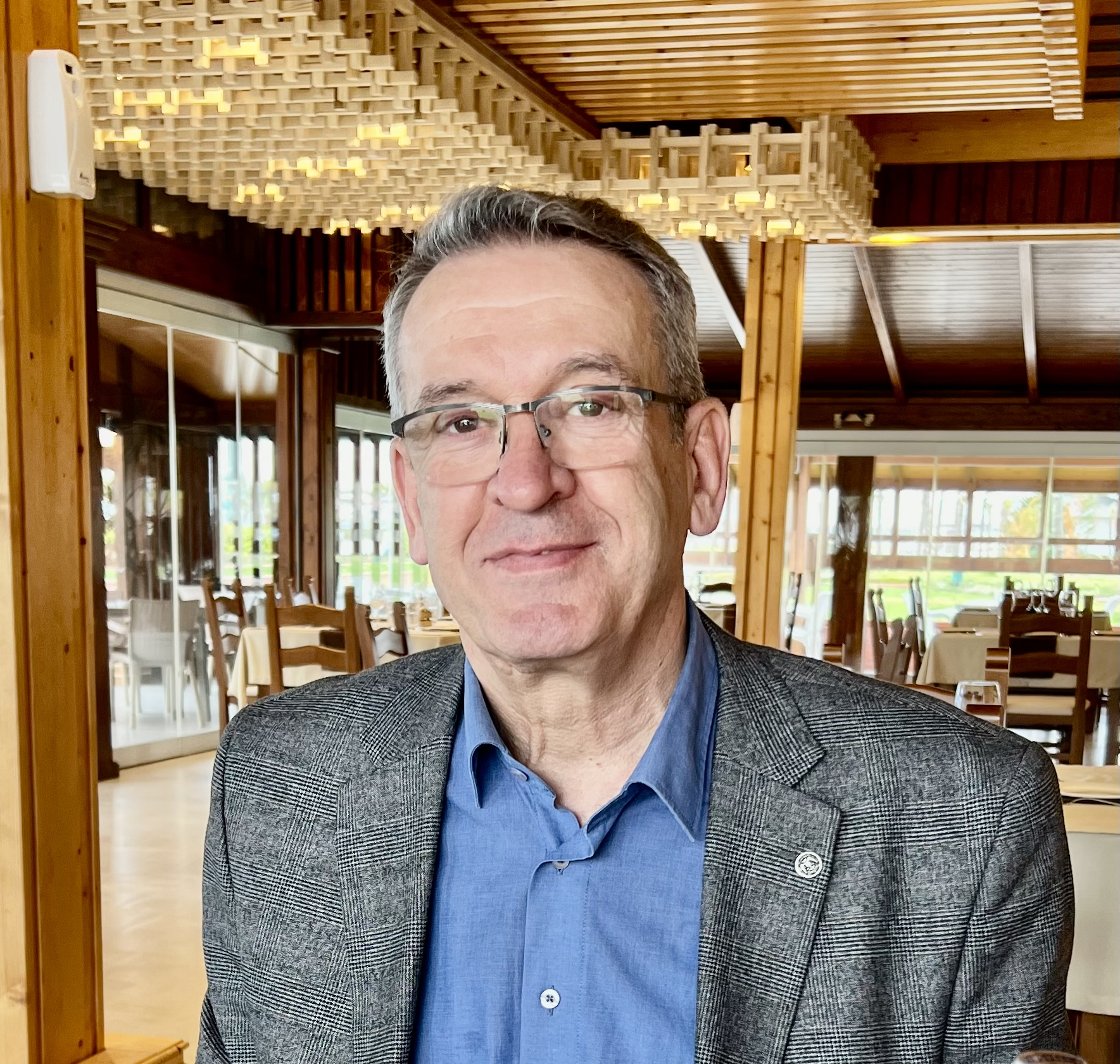
Ismet Azizi

Ismet Azizi (born 1960 in Gjilan, Kosovo) is a Kosovo-Albanian publicist, professor of geography, researcher and one of the oldest contributors and Wikipedians on the Albanian Wikipedia.

== Biography ==
Azizi completed his primary and secondary education in his hometown and, after that, continued his education and graduated from the Faculty of Natural Sciences, majoring in geography at the University of Pristina. Also, he completed post-graduate studies in public administration and diplomacy at AAB University in Prishtina. He has been involved in various historical and cultural studies, focusing primarily on the history of Albanians in the Balkans. Azizi's work includes numerous publications and articles that contribute to the understanding of Albanian heritage and historical events. His research often addresses themes such as national identity, historical conflicts, and cultural developments in the region. Azizi is the founder and chairman of the association "Kosova for Sanjak", which aims to promote the ties between Sanxhak and the Albanians of Kosovo. His organization promotes cooperation between Albanians, Sanjaklinjes and Bosnians, and publishes articles on the history and politics of the region. Azizi actively defends Sanjak's autonomy based on the right to self-determination. As a researcher, he organizes lectures on the history of the inhabitants of this region. He has participated in conferences focusing on war crimes committed by the armies of the Kingdom of Serbia and the Kingdom of Montenegro, sometimes labeling some World War II crimes as "genocide" in his writings. He owns the Dardania Press portal. His exhibitions, titled "Sanjak: A Story of National Pain", have been held in various countries.

== Books ==
- "Aqif Blyta Kolos i Pazarit të Ri" (in Albanian)
- "Aqif ef. Hadžiahmetović Bljuta Velikan Sandžaka" (in Bosnian)
- "Lahutarët e Sanxhakut të Pazarit të Ri", (coauthor)
