= Ismet Đuherić =

Bosnian Serb army commander (1949–2025)

- Born: 14 March 1949; Bosanski Dubočac, PR Bosnia and Herzegovina, FPR Yugoslavia
- Died: 7 November 2025 (aged 76); Brod, Bosnia and Herzegovina
- Military career
- Allegiance: Republika Srpska
- Rank: Commander
- Commands: Meša Selimović Company ( VRS)
- Conflicts: Bosnian War

Ismet Đuherić (14 March 1949 – 7 November 2025) was the first commander of the Meša Selimović Company (named for Yugoslav writer Meša Selimović) of the Army of the Republika Srpska (the Bosnian Serb Army). The unit consisted of 120 men, mostly Muslim Serbs from a few villages in the municipalities of Bosanski Brod and Derventa, but also other Serbs and Croats. The unit was a source of controversy in the Bosnian War. During the war, Bosniaks were mostly expelled from the Serb-controlled territories in a process which would later be called ethnic cleansing, excluding some villagers who were instead organized into the Meša Selimović unit with the help of Slavko Lisica, a Serb general who helped the remaining Bosniaks on Ismet Đuherić's request.

Đuherić was born on 14 March 1949. He later lived with his wife Hanumica in the village of Sijekovac near Bosanski Brod. He and his daughter were employees of the oil refinery in Brod. Discounting several months spent as refugees in the nearby villages of Dubočac and Kobas, the Đuherićs are the only Muslim family that was run out of the village of Sijekovac during the war. After the war, Đuherić was elected to serve as president of the Sijekovac local community again, as he had before the war.

Ismet Đuherić died on 7 November 2025, at the age of 76.
