= Altin Çuko =

Albanian footballer (1974–2025)

Personal information
- Date of birth: 21 June 1974
- Place of birth: Albania
- Date of death: 5 March 2025 (aged 50)
- Position: Forward

Senior career*
Years	Team	Apps	(Gls)
1992–1994	Lushnja	48	(25)
1994–1995	Tomori Berat	22	(20)
1995	Laçi	16	(18)
1998–1999	Tomori Berat	18	(20)
Total		104	(83)
- * Club domestic league appearances and goals

Altin Çuko (21 June 1974 – 5 March 2025) was an Albanian footballer who played as a forward. He won the Albanian Superliga Golden Boot, scoring 21 goals during the 1995–96 campaign, 5 with Tomori Berat and 16 with KF Laçi.

Not renowned for a prolific scoring record, Çuko scored a remarkable 7 goals in Laçi's final two matches to finish top of the goalscorers chart ahead of Shpëtim Kateshi who scored an even more remarkable 12 in Shkumbini Peqins final 5 matches, 7 of those also in the final two games.

Çuko died on 5 March 2025, at the age of 50.
