= 1995–96 Kategoria e Dytë =

Kategoria e Dytë
- Season: 1995–96
- Champions: Lushnja
- Promoted: Lushnja; Bylis
- Relegated: Kamza

The 1995–96 Kategoria e Dytë was the 49th season of a second-tier association football league in Albania.

== Group A ==
| Pos | Team | Pld | HW | AW | 3RW | D | L | GF | GA | GD | Pts | Promotion |
|---|---|---|---|---|---|---|---|---|---|---|---|---|
| 1 | Bylis (P) | 30 | 10 | 10 | 6 | 4 | 0 | 121 | 14 | +107 | 72 | Promotion to 1996–97 National Championship |
| 2 | Minatori | 30 | 9 | 6 | 4 | 5 | 6 | 59 | 27 | +32 | 53 | |
| 3 | Tepelena | 32 | 8 | 6 | 1 | 3 | 14 | 60 | 61 | −1 | 40 | |
| 4 | Bistrica | 30 | 8 | 4 | 1 | 2 | 15 | 50 | 46 | +4 | 33 | |
| 5 | Pogradeci | 30 | 8 | 5 | 0 | 1 | 16 | 57 | 63 | −6 | 32 | |
| 6 | Gramozi | 30 | 7 | 4 | 0 | 6 | 13 | 50 | 61 | −11 | 32 | |
| 7 | Selenicë | 30 | 7 | 4 | 1 | 2 | 16 | 54 | 66 | −12 | 31 | |
| 8 | Përmeti | 30 | 6 | 3 | 0 | 5 | 16 | 26 | 60 | −34 | 26 | |
| 9 | Turbina | 30 | 7 | 2 | 0 | 5 | 16 | 50 | 65 | −15 | 25 | |
| 10 | Butrinti | 30 | 5 | 4 | 0 | 3 | 18 | 38 | 69 | −31 | 25 | |
| 11 | Naftëtari | 30 | 7 | 2 | 0 | 4 | 17 | 33 | 66 | −33 | 24 | |

Rules for classification: In home/away rounds, home wins (HW) count for two points, away wins (AW) for three points. In the third round, all wins (3RW) count for three points.
(P) Promoted

== Group B ==
| Pos | Team | Pld | HW | AW | 3RW | D | L | GF | GA | GD | Pts | Promotion or relegation |
|---|---|---|---|---|---|---|---|---|---|---|---|---|
| 1 | Lushnja (C, P) | 27 | 9 | 4 | 8 | 4 | 2 | 82 | 8 | +74 | 58 | Promotion to 1996–97 National Championship |
| 2 | Burreli | 27 | 9 | 5 | 7 | 1 | 5 | 80 | 25 | +55 | 55 | |
| 3 | Rrogozhinë | 27 | 8 | 4 | 7 | 4 | 4 | 53 | 17 | +36 | 53 | |
| 4 | Durrësi | 27 | 7 | 5 | 3 | 4 | 8 | 41 | 26 | +15 | 42 | |
| 5 | Korabi | 27 | 4 | 3 | 3 | 7 | 10 | 35 | 33 | +2 | 33 | |
| 6 | Albanët | 27 | 4 | 2 | 3 | 5 | 13 | 34 | 41 | −7 | 28 | |
| 7 | Erzeni | 27 | 4 | 1 | 3 | 5 | 14 | 41 | 46 | −5 | 25 | |
| 8 | Kamza (R) | 27 | 1 | 1 | 2 | 4 | 19 | 24 | 87 | −63 | 15 | Relegation to 1996–97 Kategoria e Tretë |
| 9 | Iliria | 27 | 4 | 1 | 0 | 2 | 20 | 18 | 66 | −48 | 13 | |
| 10 | Amaro Divas Romët | 27 | 1 | 0 | 2 | 4 | 20 | 20 | 79 | −59 | 12 | |

Rules for classification: In home/away rounds, home wins (HW) count for two points, away wins (AW) for three points. In the third round, all wins (3RW) count for three points.
(C) Champion; (P) Promoted; (R) Relegated

== Final ==
| Team 1 | Score | Team 2 |
|---|---|---|
| Lushnja | 1–0 | Bylis |
