= Ismet Horo =

Bosnia and Herzegovina actor

- Born: 5 July 1959 (age 65); Sarajevo, Bosnia and Herzegovina
- Years active: 1986–present

Ismet Horo (Serbo-Croatian Cyrillic: Исмет Хоро; born 5 July 1959) is a Bosnian comedian. Horo began his professional comedy career in 1986 and has since released 16 comedy albums, three stand-up specials and a comedic book. He regularly appears on Bosnian talk shows and television series.

== Early life ==
Horo was born in 1959. Horo states that his interest in comedy began when he was still in high school.

== Bibliography ==
- Ovdje ni lokum nije rahat (2007)

== Discography ==
- Al sam isp'o seljak (1995)
- Dav'diš tuge bez Juge (1996)
- Bosna je bila i biće (1997)
- Staću, kad sam taki (1998)
- Nove fore Ismet Hore (1999)
- Šuti i trpi (2000)
- Jedan je Ismet Horo (2000)
- Ja samo pjevam (2001)
- Naša je sreća u kanti smeća (2001)
- Horo traži koku (2002)
- Smijehom protiv bora uz Ismeta Hora (2003)
- Horo i Pajdo - Iz oćiju nam kradu (2003)
- Tri majstora smijeha (2004)
- Stislo sa svih strana (2004)
- Tjeraju me u Evropu a ja nemam ni za klopu (2005)
- Dobra vakta k'o obraza nema (2006)
- Uživo (2006)
- Al sam isp'o seljak (2007 version)
- Ovdje ni lokum nije rahat (2007)
- Daj šta daš (2011)
- Ne kradi jer će biti konkurencija vladi (2013; plus DVD)
- Ako glasate za nas (2014)

== VHS and DVD ==
- Ismet Horo - Nove fore - Dvije žene a ja sam (2001)
- Trazim djevicu da odmorim ljevicu (2002)
- Ja kokuz vehbija bakzuz (2004)
