= 1936 Kategoria e Dytë =

Kategoria e Dytë
- Season: 1936
- Champions: Bashkimi Elbasan
- Promoted: Bashkimi Elbasan; SK Vlorë

The 1936 Kategoria e Dytë is the fifth season of the second tier of football in Albania. The league began on 7 June and finished in August 1936. It was divided into 3 groups, where the winner of each group qualified for the finals which was competed between 3 teams. The winners were Bardhyli Lezhë, who won both their games in the round-robin finals.

== Group A ==
Team	Location
Bardhyli Lezhë	Lezhë
Çerdhja e Lirisë Krujë	Krujë
Kongresi i Lushnjës	Lushnjë
Tomori Berat	Berat

Bardhyli Lezhë won the group

== Group B ==
Team	Location
Shkumbini Peqin	Peqin
Bashkimi Dibran Peshkopi	Peshkopi
Devolli Bilisht	Bilisht

Shkumbini Peqin won the group

== Group C ==
Team	Location
Leka i Madh Permet	Permet
Nimet Abazi Delvinë	Delvinë
Drita Gjirokastër	Gjirokastër

Leka i Madh Permet won the group

== Finals ==
July 1936	Bardhyli Lezhë	7 – 2	Leka i Madh Permet	Durrës, Albania

July 1936	Leka i Madh Permet	3 – 0	Shkumbini Peqin	Durrës, Albania

July 1936	Bardhyli Lezhë	4 – 0	Shkumbini Peqin	Durrës, Albania

Pos	Team	Pld	W	D	L	GF	GA	GR	Pts
1	Bardhyli Lezhë	2	2	0	0	11	2	5.500	4
2	Leka i Madh Permet	2	1	0	1	5	7	0.714	2
3	Shkumbini Peqin	2	0	0	2	0	7	0.000	0

Finals held in Durrës between 27 and 29 July 1936
