= 1933 Kategoria e Dytë =

Kategoria e Dytë
- Season: 1933
- Champions: Bashkimi Elbasan
- Promoted: Bashkimi Elbasan; SK Vlorë

The 1933 Kategoria e Dytë is the third season of the second tier of football in Albania. The league was divided into 3 groups, Group A being an exhibition tournament and the winners of Group B and C played each other in the final. The final was played between Bashkimi Elbasan and SK Vlorë. Bashkimi Elbasan won the final 3-2.

== Group A ==
Team	Location
SK Tirana B	Tirana
Bashkimi Shkodran B	Shkodër
Dopolavoro Tirana	Tirana
SK Kavajë B	Kavajë
Skënderbeu Korçë B	Korçë

Played as an exhibition tournament

== Group B ==
Team	Location
Bashkimi Elbasan	Elbasan
Shkumbini Peqin	Peqin
SK Fier	Fier
Kongresi i Lushnjës	Lushnjë
Muzaka Berat	Berat

Bashkimi Elbasan won the group

== Group C ==
Team	Location
SK Vlorë	Vlorë
Nimet Abazi Delvinë	Delvinë
Leka i Madh Permet	Permet
Shqiponja Gjirokastër	Gjirokastër
Vetëtima Himarë	Himarë

SK Vlorë won the group

== Final ==
4 July 1933	Bashkimi Elbasan	0–2	SK Vlorë

11 July 1933	Bashkimi Elbasan	?–?	SK Vlorë

Both games were annulled and a rematch was scheduled

=== Rematch ===
13 August 1933	Bashkimi Elbasan	3 – 2	SK Vlorë
	Bizhuta; Biçaku; B.Jolldashi

== Winning team ==
Bashkimi Elbasan

- (Albania) Hysen Gjylaçi (GK)
- (Albania) Mehmet Haxhihasani (GK)
- (Albania) Maksut Ismaili (GK)
- (Albania) Hajri Kapllani
- (Albania) Muharrem Musta
- (Albania) Sefedin Biçaku
- (Albania) Shefqet Bizhuta
- (Albania) Haxhi Çiftja
- (Albania) Xhavit Saraçi
- (Albania) Lec Shllaku
- (Albania) Shefqet Graceni
- (Albania) Behexhet Jolldashi
- (Albania) Rifat Jolldashi
- (Albania) Hysen Struga
- (Albania) Q. Tafani
- (Albania) Reshit Tola
- (Albania) M. Stambollxhiu
- (Albania) Faik Pajuni
- (Albania) Abas Xhafa
- Coach: (Albania) Ahmet Haxhihasani
