= Ismet Peja =

Albanian folk singer (1937–2020)

- Born: 27 April 1937; Gjakova, SFR Yugoslavia (now Republic of Kosovo)
- Died: 23 November 2020 (aged 83)
- Occupation: Singer

Ismet Peja (27 April 1937 – 23 November 2020) was an Albanian folk singer from Kosovo. He has been credited as among the most influential Albanian folk singers.

He was the son of Musa Peja, who was also an Albanian folk singer. He began to play music in his youth, at about 13-14. He became a singer and went on to build a difficult "urban repertoire", which in the years he further expanded, also including commercial songs. He became part of the group "Hajdar Dushi" with which he achieved his greatest successes and had numerous presentations at TVP and Radio Prishtina. His first album was released in 1986 with the "Hajdar Dushi" orchestra. He released a large number of music albums and 4 videotapes. In 2010, Ismet Peja and Burim Mehmeti released "Knoma Kengen Sa T`jam Gjalle". Lyrics and music for the song were written and composed by Besim Bunjaku. In 2012, Ismet Peja and Vellezerit Mziu released the album "Gamle Folkesange".

He died on 23 November 2020. The then Minister of Culture, Youth and Sports Vlora Dumoshi reacted to his death, stating that his name will be "eternally associated with the original Albanian song, with the Albanian folk melody and with the musical activity of Kosovo in general."
