= Ismatullah (Bagram detainee) =

- Arrested: winter 2009; Khost
- Detained at: Bagram

Ismatullah is a citizen of Afghanistan. According to Asia Times Ismatullah, a resident of Khost, "simply vanished" in the winter of 2009, after hanging out with some friends at the bazaar. Months after his disappearance his family received a letter, through the Red Cross. Ismatullah wrote that he had been apprehended on his way home from the bazaar. He was currently held in extrajudicial detention in the United States' Bagram Theater Internment Facility, and didn't know when he would be released.
