= Ylli Vesel Shehu =

Albanian politician

Ylli Shehu (born February 24, 1981, Kukës, Albania) is a Member of the Assembly of Albania. Shehu is a lawyer by profession; he graduated from the University of Tirana.
