= Ismet Shehu =

Albanian chef

- Occupation: Chef

Ismet Shehu, also known as Ceren Ismet Shehu, is a UK-trained chef from Albania. He was one of the five student chefs who served lunch to the late Queen Elizabeth II and Prince Philip during the 2012 Diamond Jubilee celebrations. He is the owner of Kazerma e Cerenit, an Albanian historical military site which he turned into an agro-tourism business and dining restaurant.

== Life and career ==
Shehu, migrated from Albania to Britain at age 17. After arriving in the UK, he entered the construction and hospitality industries where he served for a few years before taking up a university course in hospitality and catering. The course gave him and four other students the rare opportunity of serving lunch to the late Queen Elizabeth II and Prince Philip during the 2012 Diamond Jubilee celebrations.

Shehu later returned to Tirana, Albania, where he established and runs a chain of restaurants including Ceren Ismet Shehu and his newest restaurant Kazerma e Cerenit, an Albanian historical military site which he turned into an agro-tourism business and dining restaurant.
