= 1993–94 Albanian National Championship =

Albanian National Championship
- Season: 1993–94
- Champions: Teuta; 1st Albanian title
- Relegated: Lushnja; Sopoti
- Champions League: None
- UEFA Cup: Teuta
- Cup Winners' Cup: Tirana
- Matches: 182
- Goals: 388 (2.13 per match)
- Top goalscorer: Edi Martini (14 goals)

The 1993–94 Albanian National Championship was the 55th season of the Albanian National Championship, the top professional league for association football clubs, since its establishment in 1930.

== Teams ==
=== Stadia and last season ===
Locations of the 1993–94 Albanian National Championship teams

Team	Location	Stadium	Capacity	Last season
Albpetrol	Patos	Alush Noga Stadium	2,150	9th
Apolonia	Fier	Loni Papuçiu Stadium	10,000	7th
Besa	Kavajë	Besa Stadium	8,000	3rd
Besëlidhja	Lezhë	Brian Filipi Stadium	5,000	Kategoria e Dytë
Dinamo Tirana	Tirana	Qemal Stafa Stadium (Note: Dinamo Tirana, Partizani and Tirana all shared the Qemal Stafa Stadium as well as the Selman Stërmasi Stadium.)	19,700	6th
Elbasani	Elbasan	Ruzhdi Bizhuta Stadium	15,000	5th
Flamurtari	Vlorë	Flamurtari Stadium	15,000	13th
Laçi	Laç	Laçi Stadium	5,000	10th
Lushnja	Lushnjë	Abdurrahman Roza Haxhiu Stadium	12,000	8th
Partizani	Tirana	Qemal Stafa Stadium	19,700	Champions
Sopoti	Librazhd	Sopoti Stadium	3,000	12th
Teuta	Durrës	Niko Dovana Stadium	12,040	2nd
Tirana	Tirana	Qemal Stafa Stadium	19,700	11th
Vllaznia	Shkodër	Loro Boriçi Stadium	15,000	4th

== League table ==
Pos	Team	Pld	W	D	L	GF	GA	GD	Pts	Qualification
1	Teuta (C)	26	14	9	3	37	9	+28	37	Qualification for the UEFA Cup preliminary round
2	Tirana	26	13	7	6	36	16	+20	33	Qualification for the Cup Winners' Cup qualifying round
3	Flamurtari	26	11	8	7	26	21	+5	30	
4	Vllaznia	26	11	6	9	33	28	+5	28	
5	Partizani	26	6	13	7	27	25	+2	25	
6	Dinamo Tirana	26	5	15	6	25	27	−2	25	
7	Apolonia	26	8	9	9	25	28	−3	25	
8	Elbasani	26	9	7	10	26	30	−4	25	
9	Albpetrol	26	8	8	10	31	31	0	24	
10	Besëlidhja	26	9	6	11	27	33	−6	24	
11	Besa	26	8	8	10	24	37	−13	24	
12	Laçi	26	8	7	11	32	36	−4	23	
13	Lushnja (R)	26	7	9	10	20	25	−5	23	Qualification for the relegation play-offs
14	Sopoti (R)	26	6	6	14	19	42	−23	18	Qualification for the relegation play-offs

Source: RSSSF.org
(C) Champions; (R) Relegated

== Results ==
Home \ Away	ALB	APO	BES	BSL	DIN	ELB	FLA	LAÇ	LUS	PAR	SOP	TEU	TIR	VLL
Albpetrol		1–1	2–2	3–0	0–0	2–1	1–0	2–2	3–0	2–1	4–0	1–1	2–1	2–0
Apolonia	4–0		0–0	2–0	1–1	4–0	0–2	3–0	1–0	0–0	1–0	0–2	0–2	1–0
Besa	2–1	0–0		2–0	1–1	1–0	0–0	2–0	0–2	1–1	2–0	0–3	1–0	1–0
Besëlidhja	1–0	2–0	5–1		1–1	2–0	1–2	2–1	2–1	0–0	2–0	0–0	2–1	2–1
Dinamo	1–1	1–0	1–2	2–2		0–0	2–2	1–0	1–0	0–0	1–1	0–0	0–3	0–0
Elbasani	3–0	0–0	2–2	2–0	1–0		1–0	1–1	0–0	1–1	2–0	1–0	2–1	2–1
Flamurtari	1–1	0–0	2–1	1–0	2–1	2–0		2–0	3–0	1–1	3–0	0–0	1–0	1–0
Laçi	2–1	2–0	4–0	2–2	2–2	2–1	5–0		2–0	3–1	3–1	0–0	0–0	0–2
Lushnja	2–1	1–1	2–1	4–0	2–3	0–0	1–0	1–0		0–0	3–0	0–1	0–0	1–1
Partizani	0–0	2–2	2–0	1–1	0–0	3–1	3–1	4–0	0–0		3–0	0–3	0–1	1–3
Sopoti	1–0	3–4	4–1	1–0	2–1	2–1	0–0	2–0	0–0	1–1		0–0	0–0	0–2
Teuta	1–0	4–0	2–0	1–0	1–3	0–1	2–0	4–0	2–0	2–0	4–0		2–2	1–0
Tirana	1–0	3–0	2–0	2–0	1–0	3–1	1–0	1–1	0–0	0–1	2–0	1–1		5–0
Vllaznia	3–1	2–0	1–1	2–0	2–2	3–2	0–0	1–0	3–0	2–1	2–1	0–0	2–3	

Source: EU-Football.info
Legend: Blue = home team win; Yellow = draw; Red = away team win.

== Relegation/promotion playoff ==
=== First round ===
Team 1	Score	Team 2
Sopoti	0–1	Erzeni
Vëllazërimi	1–6	Tomori
Shkumbini	1–0	Lushnja
Bistrica	1–2	Pogradeci

- Sopoti and Lushnja were relegated to 1994–95 Kategoria e Dytë.

=== Second round ===
Team 1	Score	Team 2
Tomori	4–2	Erzeni
Shkumbini	1–0	Pogradeci

- Tomori and Shkumbini were promoted to 1994–95 Albanian National Championship.

== Season statistics ==
=== Top scorers ===
Rank	Player	Club	Goals
1	(Albania) Edi Martini	Vllaznia	14
2	(Albania) Indrit Fortuzi	Tirana	11
3	(Albania) Gerd Haxhiu	Flamurtari	9
3	(Albania) Nikolin Coçlli	Partizani	9
5	(Albania) Hasan Hoxha	Besëlidhja	8
5	(Albania) Nefail Sula	Besëlidhja	8
7	(Albania) Gentian Stojku	Elbasani	7
7	(Albania) Edmond Dalipi	Dinamo Tirana	7
7	(Albania) Roland Zajmi	Dinamo Tirana	7
7	(Albania) Andi Vuthi	Laçi	7
7	(Albania) Agustin Ujka	Laçi	7
