= Arben Shehu =

Albanian footballer

Personal information
- Full name: Arben Shehu
- Date of birth: 6 June 1980 (age 46)
- Place of birth: Albania
- Position: Centre forward

Senior career*
Years	Team	Apps	(Gls)
1990–1991	Luftëtari	16	(1)
1994–1998	Shqiponja	92	(41)
2000	Teuta	6	(0)
2001	Tomori	5	(1)
2001–2002	Bylis	18	(1)
- * Club domestic league appearances and goals

Arben Shehu (born 1980) is a former Albanian football striker who played for Luftëtari Gjirokastër, Teuta Durres and Bylis Ballsh.

== Club career ==
He was the top goalscorer in the Albanian Superliga for the 1994–1995 season with 21 goals in 28 games for newly promoted Shqiponja Gjirokastër, after topping the Albanian First Division's goalscoring charts a season earlier.

== Personal life ==
Shehu works as a sports inspector in Memaliaj Municipality and is technical director at local club KF Memaliaj.
