= KF Përmeti =

Albanian football club

- Full name: Klubi i Futbollit Përmet
- Founded: 1930; 96 years ago as Leka i Madh Përmet
- Ground: Durim Qypi Stadium
- Capacity: 4,000
- Manager: Bledar Hajredini
- League: Kategoria e Tretë, Group B
- 2025–26: Kategoria e Tretë, Group B, 3rd
Home colours	Away colours

KF Përmeti is an Albanian football club based in Përmet, which is in the Gjirokastër District. The club's home ground is the Durim Qypi Stadium and they currently compete in the Kategoria e Tretë.

== History ==
=== Early years ===
The club was founded in 1930 as Leka i Madh Përmet (English: Alexander the Great Përmet), following the merger of the Vjosa and Nemërçka sports associations, which had been founded in 1924 and 1926, respectively. They first competed in a national competition in the 1932 Albanian First Division, where they were in Group C along with SK Narta, Shqiponja Gjirokastër and eventual group winners SK Vlorë. They competed in the following 1933 Albanian First Division, where they were once again in Group C with Nimet Abazi Delvinë, Shqiponja Gjirokastër, Vetëtima Himarë and group winners in consecutive years SK Vlorë. They did not compete in the 1934 competition and as there was no competition held the following year they were to return for the 1936 Albanian First Division, where they to compete in Group C along with Nimet Abazi Delvinë and Drita Gjirokastër. Leka i Madh Përmet won the group and progressed to the finals stage, which was held in Durrës between the 27th and 29 July 1936, and was competed between Leka i Madh Përmet, Bardhyli Lezhë and Shkumbini Peqin. They lost their opening finals game against Bardhyli Lezhë 7–2 but went on to defeat Shkumbini Peqin 3–0, to finish second in the finals stage behind Bardhyli Lezhë.

=== 24 Maji ===
There were no official lower-tier football competitions held in Albania between 1937 and 1948 due primarily to events of World War II, meaning sports clubs in Albania ceased operations or at best were severely restricted in their activities. In 1945, the club's name was changed to 24 Maji Përmet by the Communist Party of Albania who had just taken control of the country, in order to mark the date of the communist congress held in the city in 1944. The club restarted its activities in 1949 when they competed in Group 8 of the Albanian First Division but did not progress past the first stage of the competition. The following season the Albanian First Division was held in a knockout format, and they defeated KF Tepelena 1–0 on aggregate over two legs to progress to the second round, where they were beaten 14–4 on aggregate by Tomori Berat following 9–2 and 5–2 losses. In 1951, the ruling Party of Labour of Albania forced every team in the country to change their name and 24 Maji were to be called Puna, which literally translates to Labour, and in the 1951 Albanian First Division Puna Përmet as they were now called competed in Group 7 but did not progress out of the initial group stage. They did not compete competitively again until 1954 where they were put in Group 5 of the Albanian First Division, and once again not progressing past the first stage.

=== KF Përmeti (1992–present) ===
Club crest used from 1992 until 2026.

Following the fall of communism in Albania, the club dropped its political name in 1992 and was rebranded as KF Përmeti. Over the subsequent decades, the club competed primarily in the lower tiers of the Albanian football league system, alternating between the Kategoria e Dytë and Kategoria e Tretë. During the 2003–04 league restructuring, Përmeti narrowly avoided relegation, and in 2023 they reached the Kategoria e Tretë promotion play-off, losing 2–0 to local rivals KF Këlcyra.

A period of revival began in the 2024–25 and 2025–26 seasons as the senior team returned to playing regularly at its historic home ground, Durim Qypi Stadium, and achieved third-place finishes in its division while integrating youth academy graduates into the first team.

In 2026, the club underwent administrative reorganization under the sports association Shoqata "Klubi i Futbollit" Përmet and introduced a new crest depicting Përmet's landmark Guri i Qytetit (City Stone).

== Current squad ==
As of 16 November 2026

Note: Flags indicate national team as defined under FIFA eligibility rules; some limited exceptions apply. Players may hold more than one non-FIFA nationality.

No.	Pos.	Nation	Player
1	GK	CMR	Muondo Louis Maria
2	FW	ALB	Mario Sulejmani
5	MF	ALB	Qerim Cuni
6	FW	ALB	Fatjon Sakollari
7	MF	ALB	Orgest Todhe
8	MF	ALB	Klejdi Dhima
9	MF	ALB	Enes Koci
10	MF	ALB	Leonardo Petro
11	FW	ALB	Ervis Hysenj
14	DF	ALB	Agustin Pelushaj
15	MF	ALB	Ervin Ahmati
17	DF	CMR	Pierre-Bertrand Abessolo
18	MF	ALB	Ilir Petro
19	DF	ALB	Klaudio Hoxha (Captain)

No.	Pos.	Nation	Player
20	MF	ALB	Orestis Jorgollari
24	GK	ALB	Klevis Xhoga
99	DF	ALB	Paulin Zhamo
—	GK	ALB	Elfons Ymeralilaj
—	DF	ALB	Jurgen Grori
—	MF	ALB	Ergys Dauti
—	MF	ALB	Meklaud Kashari
—	MF	ALB	Antonjo Naska
—	FW	ALB	Klajdi Shini
