= 2014–15 KF Tirana season =

KF Tirana
2014–15 season
- President: Refik Halili
- Head coach: Gugash Magani (until 17 May 2015); Ndubuisi Egbo (caretaker manager)
- Stadium: Qemal Stafa Stadium; Selman Stërmasi Stadium
- Kategoria Superiore: 4th
- Albanian Cup: Semi-finals
- Top goalscorer: League: Elis Bakaj (13); All: Elis Bakaj (15)
- Highest home attendance: 5,300 vs Apolonia Fier (24 August 2014, Kategoria Superiore)
- Lowest home attendance: 1,200 vs. Teuta Durrës (22 May 2015, Kategoria Superiore)
| Home colours | Away colours | Third colours |

The 2014–15 KF Tirana season was the 94th year in Klubi i Futbollit Tirana existence and 76th competitive and consecutive season in the Kategoria Superiore.

== Season overview ==
=== June ===
Veteran Elvis Sina announced at the previous season, his retirement ending his 15 years as a professional footballer as the most-capped player. On 4 June, the first choice goalkeeper Ilion Lika left the club to sign with Flamurtari Vlorë a two-year contract as a free agent. One day later, Tirana released defender Blerim Kotobelli, who later went on to join fellow top flight side Teuta Durrës. On 15 June, Tirana announced the signing of Bylis Ballsh prodigy Stivi Frashëri for an undisclosed fee, with the transfer to become effective from 1 July. On 21 June, Mensur Limani was released the club directors decided not to give him a new contract.

=== July ===
On 1 July, Tirana signed the Shkëndija Tiranë duo David Domgjoni and Alush Gavazaj; both players joined by penning a contract until 2019. Two days later, Tirana purchased Argjend Malaj from Kosovan side Prishtina; the 19-year old midfielder signed a one-year contract with the option of another year at the end of the season. On 5 July, Tirana reinforced the team by signing with Rwanda national team forward Meddie Kagere for $10,000; he signed a two-year contract. On 11 July, Tirana completed the transfer of another striker; Tomislav Bušić joined the team on a one-year contract with an option of a further one. Three days later, Ervin Bulku returned to the club after seven years and signed a two-year contract, keeping his promise that he made years ago. Also during this day, Erando Karabeci and Mario Morina extended their contracts for another season.

On 16 July, Ivan Delić, who played a vital role in the last season, left the team to return in his home country to sign with Lovćen. On 19 July, Elis Bakaj, without playing a single minute for Skënderbeu Korçë, left the club and signed a two-year contract with Tirana, where he was assigned the vacant number 19. Five days later, Tirana signed even his cousin, the goalkeeper Edvan Bakaj from Laçi, who signed a two-year contract and picked up the number 31. Tirana continued to be active in mercato by signing Albanian international player Debatik Curri, who was a free agent. On 29 July, Tirana signed on a three-year deal the left-back Endrit Idrizaj from Bylis Ballsh for an undisclosed fee and also released Mirel Çota who signed with newly promoted side Elbasani.

=== August ===
On 1 August, Tirana send the young goalkeeper Xhino Sejdo on loan to Albanian First Division side Kamza until the end of the season. As a sign of respect to Bulku, Karabeci handed his captaincy and became the vice-captain instead. On 7 August, Ervis Kaja left the team to return to Laçi, whilst Gilberto Fortunato announced his departure after much controversies about his wage. On 21 August, Renato Hyshmeri signed a one-year contract with the club, becoming the 12th signing of the summer transfer window.

Tirana started the 2014–15 Kategoria Superiore season in strong fashion by thrashing 3–0 at home the newly promoted side Apolonia Fier, with Bakaj and Hyshmeri who scored their first goals. On 27 August, Tirana loaned Ardit Peposhi, Erion Hoxhallari and Erlind Koreshi to fellow Kategoria Superiore side Teuta Durrës until the end of the season. Three days later, Tirana grabbed its second league victory in two matches by beating 1–0 at home the title contenders Flamurtari Vlorë thanks to an Ilion Lika owngoal.

=== September ===
In the third league match against Vllaznia Shkodër on 11 September, Tirana didn't go more than a 1–1 draw; they scored a last-minute equalizer with Ervin Bulku. The match was infamously marred by crowd trouble which saw 13 people arrested and both clubs' fans receiving lengthy stadium bans. Tirana ended September in first place after a win against Elbasani, a loss to Laçi and a draw against cross-town rivals of Partizani Tirana.

=== October ===
Tirana begun October by visiting Sopoti Librazhd at Sopoti Stadium for the first leg of 2014–15 Albanian Cup; the team won 3–0 at Sopoti Stadium thanks to a Tomislav Bušić brace which was followed by the third goal of youngster Grend Halili goal. On 4 October, Tirana recorded another goalless draw, this time at Skënderbeu Korçë. In the next round, Tirana won 3–1 at home against title challengers Kukësi, This win was followed by another one at Teuta Durrës in the final round of first phase. Tirana ended the first phase on first place tied on points with Partizani.

Tirana started the second phase by recording a 3–0 home at Apolonia Fier to keep the first place. On 22 October, in the returning leg of Albanian Cup first round against Sopoti Librazhd at Selman Stërmasi Stadium, Tirana didn't go more than a 1–1 draw but advanced to the next round with the aggregate 4–1.

=== November ===
Tirana kicked off November with a disappointing goalless draw against Flamurtari Vlorë. Against Bylis Ballsh in the first leg of Albanian Cup's second round, Tirana won thanks to a Tomislav Bušić winner. On 8 November, in the next league match against Vllaznia Shkodër at home, Tirana won 1–0 to retake the championship lead. On 20 November, in the second leg of cup versus Bylis Ballsh, Tirana recorded their largest win of the season by thrashing Bylis 6–0 at Selman Stërmasi Stadium. Only three days later, Tirana recorded their second championship win for November by winning 3–2 over relegation strugglers Elbasani; the team only in the last moments thanks to a Selemani Ndikumana winner.

=== December ===
Tirana started December in the worst way possible by losing in the Capital Derby against Partizani Tirana 2–0. Five days later, Tirana bounced back by beating Skënderbeu Korçë 2–0 at Qemal Stafa Stadium thanks to Ndikumana, who scored both goals. However, four days later, Tirana suffered another loss, this time at the hands of Kukësi; it was Vilfor Hysa's early goal which decided the game. Tirana returned to the winning ways in the last match of the year, where Gugash Magani side trashed 4–2 Teuta Durrës at home; this match saw the return of the fans in the stands after the suspension. Tirana ended the year in the 4th place. On 28 December, Francis Olaki and Meddie Kagere were released by Tirana after terminating their contract by mutual consensus.

=== January ===
On 6 January, Muzaka returned to Tirana after five years absence, signing a contract until the end of the 2014–15 season, reportedly worth €5,500 a month. On 7 January he was officially unveiled as a Tirana player to the media, holding a press conference alongside the club's president Refik Halili and newly appointed director Devi Muka. Two days later, Tirana purchased Macedonia international player Kire Ristevski on an 18-month contract. On 10 January, Tirana agreed terms with Jetmir Sefa, purchasing him from Laçi for a reported nominal fee of €2,150. On 14 January, Lladrovci went to a trial with Tirana which he successfully passed and signed a pre-contract, but was sent on loan at his previous club Feronikeli until the end of the season. On 24 January, in the first competitive match of 2016, Tirana beat 2–0 Apolonia Fier at the neutral stadium of Niko Dovana Stadium thanks to a Ndikumana brace. The match was played at Niko Dovana Stadium due to reconstruction of the field of Qemal Stafa Stadium. Four days later, Endrit Idrizaj agreed terms with Apolonia Fier to join them on loan until the end of the season.

=== February ===
On 4 February, Tirana went against Apolonia Fier in the first leg of the Albanian Cup quarter-final; Apolonia surprised by scoring twice in the first half, however the goals from Morina and Karabeci held Tirana to a draw. Four days later, Tirana won 0–1 away against Vllaznia Shkodër thanks to an Elis Bakaj strike in the 91st minute to help Tirana to regain the first place. On 14 February, Tirana recorded its fifth consecutive league victory by beating Elbasani 2–0 at Redi Maloku Stadium thanks to the Sefa and Bakaj goals. On 18 February, in the returning leg of Albanian Cup quarter-final, Tirana won easily 3–0 away to progress in the next round with the aggregate 5–2. Following this win, for Tirana would come a series of negative results such as the 3–0 away loss to Laçi.

=== March ===
Tirana kicked off March by losing 1–0 against Skënderbeu Korçë. On 8 March, Tirana returned to the winning ways by defeating the title contenders Kukësi 2–0 at Niko Dovana Stadium thanks to the goals of Tomislav Bušić and Gjergji Muzaka, who scored for the first time since his return to the club. However, this win did not bring joy to the team as they lost the postponed Capital Derby for the second consecutive time against Partizani Tirana; the Red Bulls won 2–1. The team's goalkeeper Stivi Frashëri criticised too much after the match, where also the coach Gugash Magani declared that Frashëri can not cope with such pressure match. Tirana ended the third phase of championship by taking a goalless draw with the struggling side Teuta Durrës. Tirana started the fourth and the last phase on strong fashion, winning 2–0 at Apolonia with the goals of Morina and Muça.

=== April ===
The month started on 4 April with a 1–2 away win over Flamurtari Vlorë with the goals scored by Muça and Bušić. Four days later, in the first leg of Albanian Cup semi-final, Tirana was unable to break the fortitude of Laçi as they drew 0–0 at Qemal Stafa Stadium in front of more than 2,000 fans. In the next league match against Vllaznia Shkodër on 12th, Tirana were behind in the 33rd following the superb goal of Eraldo Çinari, but they responded in the second half with two goals of Muça, who scored his first career brace. After the match, he dedicated the goals to the Tirana ultras, Geri Allkaj, who died in a car accident two days before. Tirana continues its good run in league by beating 3–1 away Elbasani with the goals of Hyshmeri, Bušić and Bakaj. On 22 April, in the returning leg of Albanian Cup semi-final, Tirana fell to Laçi by losing 1–0 thanks to the winner of James Adeniyi. This match saw Tirana playing with ten players following the exclusion of Ndikumana in the 16th minute following a brawl with Olsi Teqja, who was only yellow-carded. Teqja also injured the knee of Gjergji Muzaka in the 42nd minute of the match, and he soon needed surgery on his knee. He underwent the surgery on 11 May in Rome, and started recovering from his knee injury in Greece. On 26 April, in the last league match for this month, Tirana finally prevail over Laçi by beating them 1–0 at Qemal Stafa Stadium thanks to late goal of Francis Kahata.

=== May ===
In the last derby of the season against Partizani Tirana, Tirana drew 2–2 after taking the advantage in the 34th minute with Elis Bakaj, who scored even the second goal. This draw shattered the club hopes of winning the title, as Skënderbeu cemented its first spot with five points gap and with only three matches to go. Five days later, in the next league match exactly against Skënderbeu, Tirana didn't go more than a goalless draw as Skënderbeu received what they come for. This with precious draw, Skënderbeu assured mathematically the 5th consecutive league title, as Tirana went trophyless for the third year in a row.

Now that the "league goal" was gone, the only goal left for Tirana was to qualify in the European competitions, but to achieve this they had to beat Kukësi in the penultimate championship round. However, for Tirana thing went from bad to worse as they were thrashed 4–1 by Kukësi at Zeqir Ymeri Stadium thanks to the goal of Hysa and hat-trick of Pero Pejić. This heavy lose forced the coach Gugash Magani to resign after more than a year in charge. He was temporarily replaced by his assistant Ndubuisi Egbo for the final championship round, in which Tirana won 1–0 against Teuta Durrës thanks to the late winner of Elis Bakaj. Tirana ended the season in disappointment, in an eventual 4th league place and an Albanian Cup semi-final exit to Laçi.

== Players ==
=== Squad information ===
As of 21 April 2015

| Squad No. | Name | Nationality | Position(s) | Date of birth (age) |
Goalkeepers
| 1 | Stivi Frashëri | (Albania) | GK | 29 August 1990 (aged 23) |
| 22 | Marsel Çaka | (Albania) | GK | 31 March 1995 (aged 19) |
| 31 | Edvan Bakaj | (Albania) | GK | 9 October 1987 (aged 26) |
Defenders
| 2 | David Domgjoni | (Albania) | CB | 21 May 1997 (aged 17) |
| 3 | Kire Ristevski | (North Macedonia) | LB | 22 October 1990 (aged 23) |
| 4 | Gentian Muça | (Albania) | CB / DM | 13 May 1987 (aged 27) |
| 5 | Entonio Pashaj | (Albania) | CB | 10 November 1985 (aged 28) |
| 6 | Debatik Curri | (Albania) | CB / RB / LB | 28 December 1984 (aged 29) |
| 99 | Renaldo Kalari | (Albania) | LB | 25 June 1984 (aged 30) |
Midfielders
| 8 | Ervin Bulku (captain) | (Albania) | MF / CB | 3 March 1981 (aged 33) |
| 9 | Renato Hyshmeri | (Albania) | CM / AM | 4 March 1989 (aged 25) |
| 13 | Erando Karabeci (vice-captain) | (Albania) | CM / DM / AM | 6 September 1988 (aged 25) |
| 17 | Gjergji Muzaka | (Albania) | LW / RW | 26 September 1984 (aged 29) |
| 18 | Dorian Kërçiku | (Albania) | CM / RB / LB | 30 July 1993 (aged 20) |
| 19 | Elis Bakaj | (Albania) | AM / LW / RW / CF | 25 June 1987 (aged 27) |
| 23 | Argjend Malaj | (Kosovo) | CM | 16 October 1994 (aged 19) |
| 24 | Jetmir Sefa | (Albania) | CM | 30 January 1987 (aged 27) |
| 26 | Afrim Taku | (Albania) | CM / RB / RW | 4 August 1989 (aged 24) |
| 29 | Alush Gavazaj | (Kosovo) | CM | 23 March 1995 (aged 19) |
Forwards
| 9 | Grend Halili | (Albania) | CF | 24 May 1998 (aged 16) |
| 10 | Mario Morina | (Albania) | CF | 16 October 1992 (aged 21) |
| 11 | Selemani Ndikumana | (Burundi) | CF / LW / RW | 18 March 1987 (aged 27) |
| 20 | Tomislav Bušić | (Croatia) | CF | 2 February 1986 (aged 28) |

== Transfers ==
=== In ===
==== Summer ====
| Date | Pos. | Nationality | Player | Age | Moving from | Fee | Notes | Source |
|---|---|---|---|---|---|---|---|---|
| 15 June 2014 | GK | (Albania) | Stivi Frashëri | 23 | Bylis Ballsh | Free | Effective From 1 July | |
| 1 July 2014 | DF | (Albania) | David Domgjoni | 17 | Shkëndija Tiranë | Free | | |
| 1 July 2014 | MF | (Albania) | Allush Gavazaj | 19 | Shkëndija Tiranë | Free | | |
| 3 July 2014 | MF | (Kosovo) | Argjend Malaj | 19 | Prishtina | Free | | |
| 5 July 2014 | FW | (Rwanda) | Meddie Kagere | 27 | Rayon Sports | €7,304 | | |
| 11 July 2014 | FW | (Croatia) | Tomislav Bušić | 28 | Vllaznia Shkodër | Free | | |
| 14 July 2014 | MF | (Albania) | Ervin Bulku | 33 | Sepahan | Free | | |
| 19 July 2014 | MF | (Albania) | Elis Bakaj | 27 | Skënderbeu Korçë | Free | | |
| 24 July 2014 | GK | (Albania) | Edvan Bakaj | 26 | Laçi | Free | | |
| 28 July 2014 | DF | (Albania) | Debatik Curri | 30 | Sevastopol | Free | | |
| 29 July 2014 | DF | (Albania) | Endrit Idrizaj | 25 | Bylis Ballsh | Undisclosed | | |
| 21 August 2014 | MF | (Albania) | Renato Hyshmeri | 25 | Partizani Tirana | Free | | |

==== Winter ====
| Date | Pos. | Nationality | Player | Age | Moving from | Fee | Notes | Source |
|---|---|---|---|---|---|---|---|---|
| 6 January 2015 | MF | (Albania) | Gjergji Muzaka | 30 | Flamurtari Vlorë | Free | | |
| 9 January 2015 | DF | (North Macedonia) | Kire Ristevski | 24 | Slavia Sofia | Free | | |
| 10 January 2015 | MF | (Albania) | Jetmir Sefa | 27 | Laçi | €2,150 | | |
| 17 January 2015 | MF | (Kosovo) | Lapidar Lladrovci | 24 | Feronikeli | Free | | |

=== Out ===
==== Summer ====
| Date | Pos. | Nationality | Player | Age | Moving to | Fee | Notes | Source |
|---|---|---|---|---|---|---|---|---|
| 31 May 2014 | DF | (Albania) | Elvis Sina | 35 | Retired | N/A | | |
| 4 June 2014 | GK | (Albania) | Ilion Lika | 34 | Flamurtari Vlorë | Free | | |
| 5 June 2014 | DF | (Albania) | Blerim Kotobelli | 21 | Teuta Durrës | Free | | |
| 21 June 2014 | MF | (Kosovo) | Mensur Limani | 30 | Free agent | N/A | | |
| 16 July 2014 | MF | (Montenegro) | Ivan Delić | 28 | Lovćen | Free | | |
| 29 July 2014 | FW | (Albania) | Mirel Çota | 26 | Elbasani | Free | | |
| 1 August 2014 | GK | (Albania) | Xhino Sejdo | 23 | Kamza | N/A | | |
| 7 August 2014 | DF | (Albania) | Ervis Kaja | 27 | Laçi | Free | | |
| 7 August 2014 | FW | (Brazil) | Gilberto Fortunato | 26 | Flamurtari Vlorë | Free | | |
| 27 August 2014 | MF | (Albania) | Ardit Peposhi | 20 | Teuta Durrës | N/A | On loan | |
| 27 August 2014 | DF | (Albania) | Erion Hoxhallari | 18 | Teuta Durrës | N/A | On loan | |
| 27 August 2014 | MF | (Albania) | Erlind Koreshi | 27 | Teuta Durrës | N/A | On loan | |

==== Winter ====
| Date | Pos. | Nationality | Player | Age | Moving to | Fee | Notes | Source |
|---|---|---|---|---|---|---|---|---|
| 27 December 2014 | FW | (Uganda) | Francis Olaki | 18 | Free Agent | N/A | | |
| 1 January 2015 | FW | (Rwanda) | Meddie Kagere | 28 | Free Agent | N/A | | |
| 17 January 2015 | MF | (Kosovo) | Lapidar Lladrovci | 24 | Feronikeli | On loan | | |
| 28 January 2015 | DF | (Albania) | Endrit Idrizaj | 25 | Apolonia Fier | N/A | On loan | |

== Pre-season and friendlies ==
| 13 July 2014 Friendly | Tirana (Albania) | 3–1 | (Albania) Elbasani | Tirana, Albania |
| | Karabeci 23'; Muçaj 52'; Kacoli 85' | Report | Lamçja 74' | Stadium: Selman Stërmasi Stadium; Referee: Klajdi Kola |

| 18 July 2014 Friendly | Tirana (Albania) | 4–0 | (Albania) Kukësi | Tirana, Albania |
| 17:30 CET | Bulku 50'; Koreshi 56'; Kërçiku 66'; Bušić 71' | Report | | Stadium: Skënder Halili Complex; Attendance: 600; Referee: Juxhin Xhaja |

| 26 July 2014 Friendly | Shkëndija (North Macedonia) | 3–2 | (Albania) Tirana | Tetovë, Macedonia |
| 17:30 CET | Vručina 18'; Krleski 57'; Shaqiri 90' | Report | Bušić 35'; El. Bakaj 57' | Stadium: Gradski stadion Tetovo; Attendance: 5,500; Referee: Faton Mustafi (Macedonia) |

| 30 July 2014 Friendly | Tirana (Albania) | 2–1 | (North Macedonia) Mladost Carev Dvor | Ohrid, Macedonia |
| 17:30 CET | Gavazaj 20'; Koreshi | Report | | Stadium: SRC Biljanini Izvori |

| 31 July 2014 Friendly | Shkupi (North Macedonia) | 0–0 | (Albania) Tirana | Ohrid, Macedonia |
| 17:00 CET | | Report | | Stadium: Biljanini Izvori; Attendance: 100 |

| 2 August 2014 Friendly | Tirana (Albania) | 2–0 | (Albania) Elbasani | Struga, Macedonia |
| 17:00 CET | Bušić 28'; Morina 40' | Report | | Stadium: Gradska Plaža Stadium |

| 6 August 2014 Friendly | Tirana (Albania) | 0–0 | (Albania) Teuta Durrës | Ohrid, Macedonia |
| 17:30 CET | | Report | | Stadium: SRC Biljanini Izvori |

| 13 August 2014 Friendly | Tirana (Albania) | 4–0 | (Albania) Besa Kavajë | Tirana, Albania |
| 17:45 CET | Muça 38'; El. Bakaj 53'; Ndikumana 61'; Peposhi 90+1' | Report | | Stadium: Selman Stërmasi Stadium; Attendance: 600; Referee: Erik Kaso |

| 16 August 2014 Friendly | Tirana (Albania) | 4–0 | (Albania) Dinamo Tirana | Tirana, Albania |
| 17:30 CET | Bakaj 12'; Morina 17'; Bušić 48'; Ndikumana 55' | Report | | Stadium: Selman Stërmasi Stadium; Attendance: 1,500 |

| 3 September 2014 Friendly | Tirana (Albania) | 1–0 | (Albania) Tërbuni Pukë | Tirana, Albania |
| 17:00 CET | Karabeci 65' | Report | | Stadium: Selman Stërmasi Stadium; Referee: Bardhyl Pashaj |

| 10 October 2014 Friendly | Tirana (Albania) | 1–2 | (Albania) Adriatiku Mamurras | Tirana, Albania |
| | Karabeci 45' | Report | Karapici 15'; Tusha 85' | Stadium: Selman Stërmasi Stadium |

| 7 January 2015 Friendly | Tirana (Albania) | 10–1 | (Albania) Tirana U19 | Durrës, Albania |
| | Morina 16', 24', 26', 76'; Bušić 15', 35', 47', 64'; El. Bakaj 21'; Malaj 38' | Report | Prendi 86' | Stadium: Niko Dovana Stadium |

| 14 January 2015 Friendly | Tirana (Albania) | 3–1 | (Albania) Besëlidhja Lezhë | Kavajë, Albania |
| | Muzaka 23'; Bušić 27', 37' | report | Hoxha 77' (pen.) | Stadium: Besa Stadium |

| 17 January 2015 Friendly | Tirana (Albania) | 1–0 | (Albania) Dinamo Tirana | Tirana, Albania |
| | Bušić 56' | Report | | Stadium: Skënder Halili Complex |

| 1 March 2015 Friendly | Tirana (Albania) | 7–3 | (Albania) Tirana B | Tirana, Albania |
| | Muzaka 20', 60'; Ndikumana 30', 35'; Morina 38'; Hyshmeri 80'; El. Bakaj 85' | report | Kaloshi 22', 63'; Kacoli 40' | Stadium: Skënder Halili Complex |

| 28 March 2015 Friendly | Tirana (Albania) | 4–1 | (Albania) Dinamo Tirana | Tirana, Albania |
| | Ndikumana 34'; Halili 47'; Sefa 59'; Bušić 74' | report | Imami 41' | Stadium: Skënder Halili Complex |

== Competitions ==
=== Kategoria Superiore ===
==== League table ====
| Pos | Team | Pld | W | D | L | GF | GA | GD | Pts | Qualification or relegation |
|---|---|---|---|---|---|---|---|---|---|---|
| 2 | Kukësi | 36 | 23 | 6 | 7 | 59 | 27 | +32 | 75 | Qualification for the Europa League first qualifying round |
| 3 | Partizani | 36 | 22 | 7 | 7 | 42 | 24 | +18 | 73 | Qualification for the Europa League first qualifying round |
| 4 | Tirana | 36 | 21 | 8 | 7 | 47 | 27 | +20 | 71 | |
| 5 | Laçi | 36 | 20 | 9 | 7 | 46 | 19 | +27 | 69 | Qualification for the Europa League first qualifying round (Note: Laçi qualified for the UEFA Europa League first qualifying round by winning the 2014–15 Albanian Cup.) |
| 6 | Flamurtari | 36 | 10 | 8 | 18 | 29 | 37 | −8 | 38 | |

Source: Albanian Football Association (in Albanian), Soccerway
Rules for classification: 1) points; 2) points in head-to-head matches; 3) goal difference in head-to-head matches; 4) goals scored in head-to-head matches; 5) total goal difference; 6) total goals scored; 7) draw

==== Results summary ====
| Overall | | | | | | | | Home | | | | | | Away | | | | | |
| Pld | W | D | L | GF | GA | GD | Pts | W | D | L | GF | GA | GD | W | D | L | GF | GA | GD |
|---|---|---|---|---|---|---|---|---|---|---|---|---|---|---|---|---|---|---|---|
| 36 | 21 | 8 | 7 | 47 | 27 | +20 | 71 | 14 | 3 | 1 | 28 | 7 | +21 | 7 | 5 | 6 | 19 | 20 | −1 |

Last updated: 1 June 2015.
Source: Competitive matches

==== Results by round ====
| Round | 1 | 2 | 3 | 4 | 5 | 6 | 7 | 8 | 9 | 10 | 11 | 12 | 13 | 14 | 15 | 16 | 17 | 18 | 19 | 20 | 21 | 22 | 23 | 24 | 25 | 26 | 27 | 28 | 29 | 30 | 31 | 32 | 33 | 34 | 35 | 36 |
|---|---|---|---|---|---|---|---|---|---|---|---|---|---|---|---|---|---|---|---|---|---|---|---|---|---|---|---|---|---|---|---|---|---|---|---|---|
| Ground | H | H | A | H | A | H | A | H | A | A | A | H | A | H | A | H | A | H | H | H | A | H | A | H | A | H | A | A | A | H | A | H | A | H | A | H |
| Result | W | W | D | W | L | D | D | W | W | W | D | W | W | D | L | W | L | W | W | W | W | W | L | L | L | W | D | W | W | W | W | W | D | D | L | W |
| Position | 1 | 2 | 2 | 1 | 1 | 1 | 2 | 1 | 1 | 1 | 2 | 1 | 1 | 2 | 3 | 2 | 4 | 4 | 3 | 2 | 1 | 1 | 2 | 4 | 4 | 4 | 4 | 4 | 4 | 3 | 2 | 2 | 2 | 3 | 4 | 4 |

Source: Competitive matches
A = Away; H = Home; W = Win; D = Draw; L = Loss

==== Matches ====
| 24 August 2014 1 | Tirana | 3–0 | Apolonia Fier | Tirana |
| 17:00 CET | El. Bakaj 24'; Curri (yellow card) 38'; Ndikumana 58'; Hyshmeri 90+1' | Report | Canka (yellow card) 38'; Hysenshalaj (yellow card) 64' | Stadium: Qemal Stafa Stadium; Attendance: 5,300; Referee: Andi Koci |

| 30 August 2014 2 | Tirana | 1–0 | Flamurtari Vlorë | Tirana |
| 20:00 CET | Bulku (yellow card) 25'; Ndikumana (yellow card) 54' (yellow-red card) 60'; Ed. Bakaj (red card) 60'; Lika 65' (o.g.) | Report | Arbëri (yellow card) 52'; Mici (yellow card) 54'; Veliu (red card) 60'; Muzaka (yellow card) 76'; Vucaj (yellow card) 85' | Stadium: Qemal Stafa Stadium; Attendance: 5,000; Referee: Lorenc Jemini |

| 11 September 2014 3 | Vllaznia Shkodër | 1–1 | Tirana | Shkodër |
| 16:00 CET | Shtubina 18' (yellow card) 19'; Shala (yellow card) 67'; Selimaj (yellow card) 94' | Report | Idrizaj (yellow card) 35'; Frashëri (yellow card) 90'; Bulku 90+4' | Stadium: Loro Boriçi Stadium; Attendance: 7,000; Referee: Laver Alla |

| 14 September 2014 4 | Tirana | 2–1 | Elbasani | Tirana |
| 17:00 CET | Bušić 10'; Taku (yellow card) 55'; Pashaj (yellow card) 81'; (red card) 92' El. Bakaj; Olaki (yellow card) 91'; Curri 90+3' (yellow card) 94' | Report | Kaçuli (yellow card) 18' (goal) 45'; Gava (yellow card) 90' | Stadium: Qemal Stafa Stadium; Attendance: 0 Referee: Klajdi Kola |

| 20 September 2014 5 | Laçi | 2–0 | Tirana | Laç |
| 14:00 CET | Ćetković 30'; Zefi (yellow card) 70'; Nimani 74' | Report | Ndikumana (yellow card) 51'; Kagere (yellow card) 85'; Taku (yellow card) 90' | Stadium: Laçi Stadium; Attendance: 500; Referee: Andi Koci |

| 26 September 2014 6 | Tirana | 0–0 | Partizani Tirana | Tirana |
| 20:00 CET | Bulku (yellow card) 37'; Kalari (yellow card) 69'; Muça (yellow card) 75'; Curri (yellow card) 92' | Report | Batha (yellow card) 59'; Vrapi (yellow card) 69' | Stadium: Qemal Stafa Stadium; Attendance: 0 Referee: Bardhyl Pashaj |

| 4 October 2014 7 | Skënderbeu Korçë | 0–0 | Tirana | Korçë |
| 19:00 CET | Radaš (yellow card) 13'; Arapi (yellow card) 32'; Shkëmbi (yellow card) 52'; Martins (red card) 59'; Berisha (yellow card) 71' | Report | (yellow card) 26' Kalari; (red card) 48' Bulku; (yellow card) 39' Karabeci | Stadium: Skënderbeu Stadium; Attendance: 7,000; Referee: Kridens Meta |

| 18 October 2014 8 | Tirana | 3–1 | Kukësi | Tirana |
| 13:00 CET | Dushku 2' (o.g.); Ndikumana (yellow card) 33'; El. Bakaj 47'; Muça (yellow card) 80'; Curri 88' | Report | Peqini (yellow card) 20'; Hasani (yellow card) 52'; Lushtaku 39' (yellow card) 86'; Perić (yellow card) 89' | Stadium: Qemal Stafa Stadium; Attendance: 0 Referee: Remzi Sadiku |

| 26 October 2014 9 | Teuta Durrës | 0–1 | Tirana | Durrës |
| 16:00 CET | Kotobelli (yellow card) 51'; Dita (yellow card) 86'; Hodo (yellow card) 88' | Report | Taku (yellow card) 51'; El. Bakaj 76' (yellow card) 78' | Stadium: Niko Dovana Stadium; Attendance: 1,500; Referee: Kridens Meta |

| 29 October 2014 10 | Apolonia Fier | 0–3 | Tirana | Fier |
| 16:00 CET | Erkoçeviq (yellow card) 32'; Atanda (yellow card) 44'; Prifti (yellow card) 60' | Report | Ndikumana 2'; Karabeci (yellow card) 30'; Kalari (yellow card) 58'; El. Bakaj 65' (yellow card) 67'; Bušić (yellow card) 69'; Muça 78' | Stadium: Loni Papuçiu Stadium; Attendance: 2,000; Referee: Laver Alla |

| 2 November 2014 11 | Flamurtari Vlorë | 0–0 | Tirana | Vlorë |
| 16:00 CET | Douglas (yellow card) 2'; Liçaj (yellow card) 75' | Report | Pashaj (yellow card) 44' | Stadium: Flamurtari Stadium; Attendance: 4,000; Referee: Bardhyl Pashaj |

| 8 November 2014 12 | Tirana | 1–0 | Vllaznia Shkodër | Tirana |
| 16:00 CET | Karabeci (yellow card) 38'; Taku 64'; Bulku (yellow card) 90+1'; Kagere (yellow card) 90+2' | Report | Sykaj (yellow card) 79'; Dema (yellow card) 81'; Sosa (yellow card) 90+1' | Stadium: Qemal Stafa Stadium; Attendance: 0 Referee: Emirjon Sino |

| 23 November 2014 13 | Elbasani | 2–3 | Tirana | Elbasan |
| 16:00 CET | Bylykbashi 18', 23' (pen.); Toçi (yellow card) 26'; Basriu (yellow card) 36'; Hila (yellow card) 90+2' | Report | Kërçiku (yellow card) 22'; Muça 27'; El. Bakaj 32' (yellow card) 81'; Frashëri (yellow card) 90+2'; Ndikumana 90+3' (yellow card) 90+4' | Stadium: Elbasan Arena; Attendance: 2,850; Referee: Andi Koçi |

| 30 November 2014 14 | Tirana | 0–0 | Laçi | Tirana |
| 13:00 CET | Kalari (yellow card) 35'; Bulku (yellow card) 79' | Report | Ofoyen (yellow card) 54'; Sefa (yellow card) 84'; Çela (yellow card) 95' | Stadium: Qemal Stafa Stadium; Attendance: 0 Referee: Enea Jorgji |

| 8 December 2014 15 | Partizani Tirana | 2–0 | Tirana | Tirana |
| 17:00 CET | Nexhipi 1'; 12' (pen.) Mazrekaj; Račić (yellow card) 42'; Cuculi (yellow card) 81'; Batha (yellow card) 87' | Report | Muça (yellow card) 17'; El. Bakaj (yellow card) 25'; Kërçiku (yellow card) 73' | Stadium: Qemal Stafa Stadium; Attendance: 11,800; Referee: Kridens Meta |

| 13 December 2014 16 | Tirana | 2–0 | Skënderbeu Korçë | Tirana |
| 12:00 CET | Ndikumana 8', 50'; Bulku (yellow card) 22'; Malaj (yellow card) 60'; El. Bakaj (yellow card) 70' | Report | Radaš (red card) 44' | Stadium: Qemal Stafa Stadium; Attendance: 0 Referee: Enea Jorgji |

| 17 December 2014 17 | Kukësi | 1–0 | Tirana | Kukës |
| 12:00 CET | Hysa 5'; Smajli (yellow card) 87'; Hasani (yellow card) 88'; Halili (yellow card) 90' | Report | Muça (yellow card) 32'; Ndikumana (yellow card) 65'; Idrizaj (yellow card) 92' | Stadium: Zeqir Ymeri Stadium; Attendance: 2,000; Referee: Enea Jorgji |

| 21 December 2014 18 | Tirana | 4–2 | Teuta Durrës | Tirana |
| 16:00 CET | El. Bakaj 34', 89' (yellow card) 62'; Morina 45+1' (pen.); Kagere 70' | Report | Hyseni 36'; Dita 49' | Stadium: Qemal Stafa Stadium; Attendance: 3,000; Referee: Emirjon Sino |

| 24 January 2015 19 | Tirana | 2–0 | Apolonia Fier | Durrës |
| 14:00 CET | Ndikumana 44', 64'; Bulku (yellow card) 75'; Sefa (yellow card) 80' | Report | Uzuni (yellow card) 61' | Stadium: Niko Dovana Stadium; Attendance: 1,000; Referee: Andi Koçi |
Note: The match was held at Niko Dovana Stadium due to reconstruction of the field of Qemal Stafa Stadium.

| 30 January 2015 20 | Tirana | 1–0 | Flamurtari Vlorë | Elbasani |
| 18:00 CET | Kërçiku (yellow card) 18'; Curri (yellow card) 20'; El. Bakaj (yellow card) 54'; Ndikumana 85' | Report | Veliu (yellow card) 18'; Nikolić (yellow card) 70'; Lena (yellow card) 79'; Idrizi (yellow card) 90' | Stadium: Elbasan Arena; Attendance: 1,500; Referee: Laver Alla |
Note: The match was held at Elbasan Arena due to reconstruction of the field of Qemal Stafa Stadium.

| 8 February 2015 21 | Vllaznia Shkodër | 0–1 | Tirana | Shkodër |
| 18:00 CET | Beqiri (yellow card) 14'; Marku (yellow card) 41'; Gocaj (yellow card) 43'; Sykaj (yellow card) 72'; Kalaja (yellow card) 82' | Report | Curri (yellow card) 5'; El. Bakaj 90+1' | Stadium: Loro Boriçi Stadium; Attendance: 2,500; Referee: Barthyl Pashaj |

| 14 February 2015 22 | Tirana | 2–0 | Elbasani | Fushë-Krujë |
| 14:00 CET | Morina (yellow card) 43'; Sefa 53' (yellow card) 63'; El. Bakaj 90+2' (pen.) | Report | Hila (yellow card) 11'; Lamçja (yellow card) 43'; Yontcha (yellow card) 60'; Malindi (yellow card) 64'; Jaupi (yellow card) 79' | Stadium: Redi Maloku Stadium; Attendance: 200; Referee: Kreshnik Cjapi |
Note: The match was held at Redi Maloku Stadium due to reconstruction of the field of Qemal Stafa Stadium.

| 22 February 2015 23 | Laçi | 3–0 | Tirana | Laç |
| 14:00 CET | Çela (yellow card) 18'; Sefgjinaj 24' (yellow card) 46'; Sheta (yellow card) 31' (yellow-red card) 41' (goal) 41'; Zefi (yellow card) 41'; Veliaj (yellow card) 52'; Mustafa (yellow card) 79'; Meto 81' | Report | Bulku (red card) 45+1'; Muzaka (yellow card) 66' | Stadium: Laçi Stadium; Attendance: 0 Referee: Enea Jorgji |

| 4 March 2015 24 | Skënderbeu Korçë | 1–0 | Tirana | Korçë |
| 18:00 CET | Arapi (yellow card) 50'; Shkëmbi (yellow card) 61' (goal) 66' (pen.); Latifi (yellow card) 89' | Report | Ndikumana (yellow card) 36'; Curri (yellow card) 45+1'; Kahata (yellow card) 62'; Kërçiku (yellow card) 65'; Ristevski (yellow card) 75'; Sefa (red card) 87' | Stadium: Skënderbeu Stadium; Attendance: 6,000; Referee: Enea Jorgji |

| 13 March 2015 25 | Tirana | 1–2 | Partizani Tirana | Tirana |
| 19:00 CET | Morina 61' (yellow card) 62'; Muça (yellow card) 88' | Report | Nexhipi 25' (yellow card) 76'; Račić 32'; Ibrahimi (yellow card) 40' | Stadium: Qemal Stafa Stadium; Attendance: 12,000; Referee: Bardhyl Pashaj |
Note: The match was originally scheduled to be played in February, but it was delayed due to reconstruction of the field of Qemal Stafa Stadium.

| 8 March 2015 26 | Tirana | 2–0 | Kukësi | Durrës |
| 17:00 CET | Bušić 72' (yellow card) 73'; Muzaka 78' | Report | Malota (yellow card) 55'; Zeqiri (yellow card) 58'; Hasani (yellow card) 88' | Stadium: Niko Dovana Stadium; Attendance: 4,000; Referee: Lorenc Jemini |
Note: The match was held at Niko Dovana Stadium due to reconstruction of the field of Qemal Stafa Stadium.

| 16 March 2015 27 | Teuta Durrës | 0–0 | Tirana | Durrës |
| 18:00 CET | Dita (yellow card) 38'; Hodo (yellow card) 43'; Kotobelli (yellow card) 53' | Report | Curri (yellow card) 73' | Stadium: Niko Dovana Stadium; Attendance: 1,500; Referee: Lorenc Jemini |

| 22 March 2015 28 | Apolonia Fier | 0–2 | Tirana | Fier |
| 14:00 CET | Dimo (red card) 21' | Report | Morina 22' (pen.); Muça 79'; Muzaka (yellow card) 83' | Stadium: Loni Papuçiu Stadium; Attendance: 800; Referee: Enea Jorgji |

| 4 April 2015 29 | Flamurtari Vlorë | 1–2 | Tirana | Vlorë |
| 16:00 CET | Bregu 47' | Report | Muça 3'; Bušić 55'; Sefa (yellow card) 89' | Stadium: Flamurtari Stadium; Attendance: 800; Referee: Lorenc Jemini |

| 12 April 2015 30 | Tirana | 2–1 | Vllaznia Shkodër | Tirana |
| 16:00 CET | Curri (yellow card) 19'; Muça 61', 76'; Muzaka (yellow card) 78' | Report | Çinari 33'; Beqiri (red card) 57' | Stadium: Qemal Stafa Stadium; Attendance: 2,000; Referee: Lorenc Jemini |

| 18 April 2015 31 | Elbasani | 1–3 | Tirana | Fushë-Krujë |
| 16:00 CET | Jaupi 5' | Report | Hyshmeri 38'; Bušić 74'; El. Bakaj 83'; Muça (yellow card) 90' | Stadium: Redi Maloku Stadium; Attendance: 400; Referee: Kreshnik Cjapi |
Note: The match was held at Niko Dovana Stadium due to reconstruction of Elbasan Arena.

| 26 April 2015 32 | Tirana | 1–0 | Laçi | Tirana |
| 18:00 CET | Kërçiku (yellow card) 41'; Karabeci (yellow card) 61'; Curri (yellow card) 84'; Kahata 88'; El. Bakaj (yellow card) 90'; Sefa (yellow card) 90+1' | Report | Çela (yellow card) 35'; Nimani (yellow card) 41'; Sosa (yellow card) 57'; Teqja (yellow card) 65'; Sheta (yellow card) 90' | Stadium: Qemal Stafa Stadium; Attendance: 3,500; Referee: Enea Jorgji |

| 4 May 2015 33 | Partizani Tirana | 2–2 | Tirana | Tirana |
| 19:45 CET | Batha (yellow card) 30'; Fazliu 55' (yellow card) 56'; Mazrekaj 82' | Report | El. Bakaj 34', 83'; Karabeci (yellow card) 58'; Kahata (yellow card) 70'; Muça (yellow card) 85'; Ed. Bakaj (yellow card) 90+5' | Stadium: Qemal Stafa Stadium; Attendance: 11,100; Referee: Lorenc Jemini |

| 9 May 2015 34 | Tirana | 0–0 | Skënderbeu Korçë | Tirana |
| 18:00 CET | Morina (yellow card) 65'; Muça (yellow card) 68'; El. Bakaj (yellow card) 86' | Report | Berisha (yellow card) 33' | Stadium: Qemal Stafa Stadium; Attendance: 5,000; Referee: Andi Koçi |

| 17 May 2015 35 | Kukësi | 4–1 | Tirana | Kukës |
| 16:00 CET | Hysa 5'; Pejić 21', 34', 27'; Lushtaku (yellow card) 39'; Zeqiri (yellow card) 68'; Shameti (yellow card) 80' | Report | Pashaj (yellow card) 39' (yellow-red card) 60'; Curri (yellow card) 59'; Ndikumana (yellow card) 80' (goal) 82' | Stadium: Zeqir Ymeri Stadium; Attendance: 1,000; Referee: Remzi Sadiku |

| 22 May 2015 36 | Tirana | 1–0 | Teuta Durrës | Tirana |
| 16:00 CET | El. Bakaj (yellow card) 61' (goal) 82' | Report | Kotobelli (yellow card) 57'; Hodo (yellow card) 80' | Stadium: Qemal Stafa Stadium; Attendance: 1,200; Referee: Skerdi Greca |

=== Albanian Cup ===
==== First round ====
| 1 October 2014 First leg | Sopoti Librazhd | 0–3 | Tirana | Cërrik |
| 14:30 (CET) | Elezi (yellow card) 30' | Report | Bušić 31', 81'; Çaka (yellow card) 47'; Halili 90+1' | Stadium: Nexhip Trungu Stadium; Attendance: 350; Referee: Olsi Sokoli |

| 22 October 2014 Second leg | Tirana | 1–1 | Sopoti Librazhd | Tirana |
| 14:30 (CET) | El. Bakaj 65' | Report | Bajrami 14'; Hoxha (yellow card) 50' | Stadium: Selman Stërmasi Stadium; Attendance: 0 Referee: Orlando Kuka |

==== Second round ====
| 5 November 2014 First Leg | Bylis Ballsh | 0–1 | Tirana | Ballsh |
| 13:00 (CET) | Shehaj (yellow card) 63'; Prifti (yellow card) 75'; Kaloshi (yellow card) 83' | Report | Olaki (yellow card) 52'; Bušić 82'; Gavazaj (yellow card) 90' | Stadium: Adush Muça Stadium; Attendance: 200; Referee: Hermal Llapra |

| 20 November 2014 Second leg | Tirana | 6–0 | Bylis Ballsh | Tirana |
| 12:30 (CET) | Olaki 13'; Taku 34', 56'; Ndikumana 47'; Bulku (yellow card) 51'; El. Bakaj 66'; Halili 81'; Idrizaj (yellow card) 90+1'; Karabeci (yellow card) 90+2' | Report | Dervishi (yellow card) 51'; Borakaj (yellow card) 60'; Mustafaraj (yellow card) 83' | Stadium: Selman Stërmasi Stadium; Attendance: 0 Referee: Olsid Ferataj |

==== Quarter-finals ====
| 4 February 2015 First leg | Tirana | 2–2 | Apolonia Fier | Krujë |
| 14:00 (CET) | Muça (yellow card) 3'; Morina 49'; Karabeci 66' (yellow card) 85'; El. Bakaj (yellow card) 90+3' | Report | Idrizaj (yellow card) 13'; Kaja (yellow card) 56'; Ribaj 30' (yellow card) 66'; Uzuni 45' (yellow card) 78'; Gërxho (yellow card) 85' | Stadium: Kastrioti Stadium; Attendance: 0 Referee: Andi Koçi |
Note: The match was held in Kastrioti Stadium due to reconstruction of Selman Stërmasi Stadium.

| 18 February 2015 Second leg | Apolonia Fier | 0–3 | Tirana | Fier |
| 17:00 (CET) | Dimo (yellow card) 39'; Caković (yellow card) 53'; Gërxho (yellow card) 61'; Nako (yellow card) 66'; Kaja (yellow card) 80' | Report | Pashaj 17'; Bušić (yellow card) 28' (goal) 85'; Taku 47'; Karabeci (yellow card) 71'; El. Bakaj (yellow card) 73'; Ed. Bakaj (yellow card) 79'; Curri (yellow card) 90+1' | Stadium: Loni Papuçiu Stadium; Attendance: 1,000; Referee: Lorenc Jemini |

==== Semi-finals ====
| 8 April 2015 First leg | Tirana | 0–0 | Laçi | Tirana |
| 16:00 (CET) | Malaj (yellow card) 5'; Ndikumana (yellow card) 80'; Kahata (yellow card) 85' | Report | Teqja (yellow card) 89' | Stadium: Qemal Stafa Stadium; Attendance: 2,500; Referee: Kridens Meta |

| 22 April 2015 Second leg | Laçi | 1–0 | Tirana | Laç |
| 14:30 (CET) | Teqja (yellow card) 16'; Sheta (yellow card) 26'; Meto (yellow card) 43'; Adeniyi 62'; Vujadinović (yellow card) 89' | Report | Ndikumana (red card) 16'; Kërçiku (yellow card) 35'; Karabeci (yellow card) 50'; Bulku (yellow card) 82' | Stadium: Laçi Stadium; Attendance: 4,000; Referee: Bardhyl Pashaj |

== Statistics ==
=== Squad stats ===
| | League | Cup | Total Stats |
|---|---|---|---|
| Games played | 36 | 8 | 44 |
| Games won | 21 | 4 | 25 |
| Games drawn | 8 | 3 | 11 |
| Games lost | 7 | 1 | 8 |
| Goals scored | 47 | 16 | 63 |
| Goals conceded | 27 | 4 | 31 |
| Goal difference | 20 | 12 | 32 |
| Clean sheets | 20 | 5 | 25 |

Last updated: 22 May 2015

=== Top scorers ===
| No. | Pos. | Nation | Name | Kategoria Superiore | Albanian Cup | Total |
|---|---|---|---|---|---|---|
| 19 | FW | (Albania) | Elis Bakaj | 13 | 2 | 15 |
| 11 | FW | (Burundi) | Selemani Ndikumana | 9 | 1 | 10 |
| 20 | FW | (Croatia) | Tomislav Bušić | 4 | 4 | 8 |
| 4 | DF | (Albania) | Gentian Muça | 6 | 0 | 6 |
| 10 | FW | (Albania) | Mario Morina | 3 | 1 | 4 |
| 26 | MF | (Albania) | Afrim Taku | 1 | 3 | 4 |
| 6 | DF | (Albania) | Debatik Curri | 2 | 0 | 2 |
| 9 | MF | (Albania) | Renato Hyshmeri | 2 | 0 | 2 |
| 9 | FW | (Albania) | Grend Halili | 0 | 2 | 2 |
| 5 | DF | (Albania) | Entonio Pashaj | 0 | 1 | 1 |
| 7 | FW | (Rwanda) | Meddie Kagere | 1 | 0 | 1 |
| 8 | MF | (Albania) | Ervin Bulku | 1 | 0 | 1 |
| 13 | MF | (Albania) | Erando Karabeci | 0 | 1 | 1 |
| 14 | FW | (Uganda) | Francis Olaki | 0 | 1 | 1 |
| 14 | MF | (Kenya) | Francis Kahata | 1 | 0 | 1 |
| 17 | MF | (Albania) | Gjergji Muzaka | 1 | 0 | 1 |
| 24 | MF | (Albania) | Jetmir Sefa | 1 | 0 | 1 |
| # | Own goals | | | 1 | 0 | 1 |
| TOTAL | | | | 47 | 16 | 63 |

Last updated: 22 May 2015

=== Clean sheets ===
The list is sorted by shirt number when total appearances are equal.

| Rnk | No. | Player | Kategoria Superiore | Albanian Cup | Total |
|---|---|---|---|---|---|
| 1 | 1 | (Albania) Stivi Frashëri | 15 | 1 (Note: Stivi Frashëri kept a clean sheet on the same match as Marsel Çaka. They both appeared in the 3–0 away win over Sopoti Librazhd on 1 October 2014. So both clean sheets are counted.) | 16 |
| 2 | 31 | (Albania) Edvan Bakaj | 5 | 4 | 9 |
| 3 | 1 | (Albania) Marsel Çaka | 0 | 1 (Note: Marsel Çaka kept a clean sheet on the same match as Stivi Frashëri. They both appeared in the 3–0 away win over Sopoti Librazhd on 1 October 2014. So both clean sheets are counted.) | 1 |
| TOTALS | | | 20 | 5 | 25 |

Last updated: 22 May 2015
