= Edvan =

Edvan is a given name. It may refer to:

- Edvan do Nascimento (born 1979), Brazilian football midfielder
- Edvan Bakaj (born 1987), Albanian football goalkeeper
- Edvan (footballer) (born 1990), Edvan França de Moraes, Brazilian football right-back
