= Lokitanyala =

Lokitanyala may refer to one of the following:

- Lokitanyala, Kenya, a settlement in West Pokot County, Kenya
- Lokitanyala, Uganda, a settlement in Moroto District, Uganda
