= Endrit Idrizaj =

Albanian footballer

Personal information
- Full name: Endrit Idrizaj
- Date of birth: 14 June 1989 (age 37)
- Place of birth: Vlorë, Albania
- Position: Left back

Team information
- Current team: Tirana

Youth career
- 2000–2008: Flamurtari

Senior career*
Years	Team	Apps	(Gls)
2008–2010	Flamurtari	0	(0)
2008–2009	→ Luftëtari (loan)	10	(0)
2010–2011	Vlora	30	(2)
2012–2013	Himara	37	(2)
2013–2014	Bylis	21	(0)
2014–2016	Tirana	9	(0)
2015–2016	→ Apolonia (loan)	7	(0)
- * Club domestic league appearances and goals as of 1 January 2016

Endrit Idrizaj (born 14 June 1989) is an Albanian football player who most recently played for KF Tirana in the Albanian Superliga.

== Career ==
=== Tirana ===
Idrizaj left Bylis Ballsh during the 2013–14 season when they were expelled from the Albanian Superliga and he joined FK Kukësi during the summer transfer window But he was still under contract with Bylis Ballsh and despite Idrizaj training with the rest of the Kukësi squad for a number of weeks, the move was never finalised as the clubs could not reach an agreement over the transfer fee. He then signed a three-year contract with KF Tirana for an undisclosed fee on 29 July 2014 and joined the team at their training camp in Ohrid, Macedonia.

On 28 January 2015 he agreed terms with Apolonia Fier to join the Albanian Superliga strugglers on loan until the end of the season in their bid to escape relegation. In only his 9th appearance into his loan spell, he was injured on 16 March 2015 in a league game against KF Laçi, and he soon needed surgery on his knee. His loan deal was cut short and Apolonia Fier were eventually relegated to the Albanian First Division, and Idrizaj continued his recovery at his parent club KF Tirana. He was not registered in the KF Tirana squad for the first half of the 2015–16 campaign, as he was still recovering from his knee injury, but he remained under contract with the club until the summer of 2017.

Idrizaj returned to professional football in January 2016, as he was registered in the KF Tirana squad and began training with the rest of the squad during the winter break in the hope of returning to match fitness since for the first time since his injury.

== Career statistics ==
=== Club ===
As of 29 July 2016

Club	Season	League			Cup		Continental (Note: Including continental competitions, such as UEFA Champions League and UEFA Europa League.)		Other (Note: Including other competitions, such as Albanian Supercup as well as promotion and relegation playoffs.)		Total	
Club	Season	Division	Apps	Goals	Apps	Goals	Apps	Goals	Apps	Goals	Apps	Goals
Luftëtari	2008–09	Albanian First Division	10	0	2	0	—		—		12	0
Luftëtari	Total		10	0	2	0	—		—		12	0
Vlora	2010–11	Albanian First Division	17	1	0	0	—		—		17	1
Vlora	2011–12	Albanian First Division	13	1	0	0	—		—		13	1
Vlora	Total		30	2	0	0	—		—		30	2
Himara	2011–12	Albanian First Division	13	2	—		—		1	0	14	2
Himara	2012–13	Albanian First Division	24	0	0	0	—		—		24	0
Himara	Total		37	2	0	0	—		1	0	38	2
Bylis	2013–14	Albanian Superliga	21	0	4	1	—		—		25	1
Bylis	Total		21	0	4	1	—		—		25	1
Tirana	2014–15	Albanian Superliga	7	0	2	0	—		—		9	0
Tirana	2015–16	Albanian Superliga	2	0	—		—		—		2	0
Tirana	2016–17	Albanian Superliga	0	0	0	0	—		—		0	0
Tirana	Total		9	0	2	0	—		—		11	0
Apolonia (loan)	2014–15	Albanian Superliga	7	0	2	0	—		—		9	0
Apolonia (loan)	Total		7	0	2	0	—		—		9	0
Career total			114	4	10	1	—		1	0	125	5
