= Edvan Bakaj =

Albanian footballer

Personal information
- Date of birth: 9 October 1987 (age 39)
- Place of birth: Tirana, Albania
- Height: 1.82 m (6 ft 0 in)
- Position: Goalkeeper

Youth career
- 2000–2004: Partizani Tirana

Senior career*
Years	Team	Apps	(Gls)
2004–2008	Partizani Tirana	20	(0)
2008–2009	Laçi	15	(0)
2009–2010	Besa Kavajë	18	(0)
2010–2011	Dinamo Tirana	2	(0)
2011–2012	Besa Kavajë	19	(0)
2012–2014	Laçi	36	(1)
2014–2017	Tirana	38	(0)
2017–2018	Liria Prizren	14	(0)
2018–2019	Drita	10	(0)
2019	Luftëtari	3	(0)
2019–2020	Tirana	6	(0)
2020–2023	Dinamo Tirana	31	(0)

International career
2003–2004	Albania U17	3	(0)
2004–2005	Albania U19	2	(0)
- * Club domestic league appearances and goals

Edvan Bakaj (born 9 October 1987) is an Albanian former professional footballer who played as a goalkeeper.

== Club career ==
=== Besa Kavajë ===
During the winter break, Bakaj announced his departure from Laçi along with the striker Julian Malo, and, in the first days of 2010, he joined Besa Kavajë on a free transfer for the second part of 2009–10.

=== Romania ===
Following recommendation from his cousin Elis Bakaj, Edvan was given a trial at newly promoted Liga II side Alro Slatina. At first it was believed to be an unsuccessful trial as he did not impress in a friendly. However, on 15 July 2011 he signed a contract at the club and joined his cousin and former teammate Elis in Romania.

=== Return to Laçi ===
On 8 August 2012, Bakaj signed a one-year deal with Laçi. He made his return debut with the club on 24 September 2012 during the league match away against Skënderbeu Korçë, where Bakaj concealed three times for a 3–0 defeat.

On 4 May 2014, Bakaj scored his first career goal during the 6–0 thrashing of Kastrioti Krujë, valid for the 22nd week of 2013–14 season, scoring from the penalty kick. He left the team after the end of the season by terminating his contract by mutual consensus.

=== Tirana ===
On 25 July 2014, Bakaj signed a two-year contract with Tirana, taking the vacant number 31 for the 2014–15 season. He made his league debut with the club on 30 November 2014 against his former side Laçi, keeping his first clean-sheet of the season in a goalless draw at home.

During the 2014–15 season, he served mostly as a back-up for first goalkeeper Stivi Frashëri, but he took his place in early March 2015 after the match against Partizani Tirana, were Frashëri made a mistake that was decisive for the faith of the match. Bakaj ended the season with 16 appearances in all competitions, including 9 in league, with Tirana who finished it in the fourth place and was eliminated in semi-finals of 2014–15 Albanian Cup against Laçi with the 1–0 aggregate.

He left the club on 7 August 2015 after being told that he was not in the plans of the technical staff, but, five days later, however, a call from the club's president Refik Halili made him to change his mind and return in training. Bakaj was the starting goalkeeper of the team during 2015–16 season, making 29 league appearances, collecting 2610 minutes as Tirana finished in 5th position. He also played in 5 Albanian Cup matches, as Tirana was eliminated in the quarter-final to Flamurtari Vlorë.

During 2016–17 season, with the arrival of veteran Ilion Lika, Bakaj was dropped to second choice, making only 5 appearances, all of them in cup, as Tirana was relegated for the first time in history, and won the cup for a record 16th time. In August 2017, Bakaj terminated his contract by mutual consent due to lack of playing time.

=== Liria Prizren ===
On 10 August 2017, Bakaj completed a transfer to Liria Prizren of Football Superleague of Kosovo for an undisclosed fee.

=== Drita ===
On 8 June 2018, Bakaj completed a transfer to fellow Football Superleague of Kosovo and defending champions Drita. On 17 July 2018, he made his debut with Drita in first qualifying round of UEFA Champions League against Swedish side Malmö after being named in the starting line-up.

Bakaj left the club on 21 January 2019, terminating the contract by mutual consent.

=== Luftëtari Gjirokastër ===
On 29 January 2019, Bakaj returned in Albanian Superliga after one-and-a-half years absence, signing with Luftëtari until the end of the season. This marked the return of the goalkeeper at the club for the first time since 2007. He spent the second part of 2018–19 season mainly as back-up, collecting only six appearances, including three in Albanian Superliga, leaving the team afterwards.

=== Tirana return ===
On 10 July 2019, Bakaj was presented the new player of Tirana, returning to the capital side for the first time since 2017.

== International career ==
Bakaj has been a former youth international player of Albania, player three and two matches respectively with U17 and U19 side.

== Personal life ==
Edvan is the cousin of Elis Bakaj, an Albania international midfielder and player of His cousin Elis Bakaj is an Albania international midfielder who plays of Kukësi. They were teammates for two years at Tirana.

== Career statistics ==
As of 15 August 2015

Club	Season	League		Cup		Continental (Note: Including continental competitions, such as UEFA Champions League and UEFA Europa League)		Other (Note: Including other competitions, such as Albanian Supercup)		Total	
Club	Season	Apps	Goals	Apps	Goals	Apps	Goals	Apps	Goals	Apps	Goals
Laçi	2008–09	15	0	1	0	—		—		16	0
Laçi	2009–10	0	0	2	0	—		—		2	0
Laçi	Total	15	0	3	0	0	0	0	0	18	0
Besa Kavajë	2009–10	3	0	—		—		—		3	0
Besa Kavajë	2010–11	15	0	0	0	1	0	1	0	17	0
Besa Kavajë	Total	18	0	0	0	1	0	1	0	20	0
Dinamo Tirana	2010–11	2	0	—		—		—		2	0
Dinamo Tirana	Total	2	0	0	0	0	0	0	0	2	0
Besa Kavajë	2011–12	19	0	4	0	—		—		23	0
Besa Kavajë	Total	19	0	4	0	0	0	0	0	23	0
Laçi	2012–13	16	0	9	0	—		—		25	0
Laçi	2013–14	22	1	5	0	2	0	1	0	30	1
Laçi	Total	38	1	14	0	2	0	1	0	55	1
Tirana	2014–15	9	0	7	0	—		—		16	0
Tirana	2015–16	0	0	0	0	—		—		0	0
Tirana	Total	9	0	7	0	0	0	0	0	16	0
Career total		101	1	28	0	3	0	2	0	134	1

== Honours ==
Besa Kavajë

- Albanian Cup: 2009–10
- Albanian Supercup: 2010

Laçi

- Albanian Cup: 2012–13

Tirana

- Albanian Superliga: 2019–20
- Albanian Cup: 2016–17
