= Bruno Dita =

Albanian professional footballer

Personal information
- Date of birth: 18 February 1993 (age 33)
- Place of birth: Tirana, Albania
- Height: 1.82 m (6 ft 0 in)
- Position: Midfielder

Team information
- Current team: Dinamo City
- Number: 19

Youth career
- 2009–2011: Dinamo Tirana

Senior career*
Years	Team	Apps	(Gls)
2011–2012	Dinamo Tirana	12	(0)
2012–2014	Besa Kavajë	53	(4)
2014–2017	Teuta Durrës	81	(10)
2017–2020	Skënderbeu Korçë	44	(6)
2020–2024	Shkëndija	109	(7)
2024–	Dinamo City	55	(1)

International career^{‡}
2008–2009	Albania U17	6	(0)
2011	Albania U18	2	(0)
2011–2012	Albania U19	5	(0)
2012–2013	Albania U21	4	(0)
- * Club domestic league appearances and goals as of 25 June 2026 ‡ National team caps and goals as of 23 February 2016

Bruno Dita (born 18 February 1993) is an Albanian professional footballer who plays as a midfielder for the Albanian club Dinamo City.

== Club career ==
=== Teuta Durrës ===
In June 2014, Dita signed with Teuta Durrës for an undisclosed fee, and was assigned number 22 for the 2014–15 season. He made his debut with the club on 23 August 2014, appearing as a second-half substitute in team's opening match of the season, a 2–1 away defeat to Flamurtari Vlorë.

Dita made his 100th top-flight appearance on 13 December 2015 in a 1–0 home loss to Skënderbeu Korçë in the 2015–16 Albanian Superliga matchday 16.

On 21 February 2016, Dita scored his first career brace, including a 97th minute-winner against the newcomers of Tërbuni Pukë, helping his side to reduce the gap with Tirana for the "European spot". He dedicated the goals to his sister and girlfriend, adding that the win was important for the team's progress.

On 31 May 2017, following the end of the 2016–17 season, where Teuta barely avoided relegation, Dita decided to leave the club along with several other players, confirming that he was not going to be part of the team for the next season.

=== Skënderbeu Korçë ===
On 5 June 2017, Dita completed a transfer to fellow Albanian Superliga side Skënderbeu Korçë by signing a two-year contract. He made his league debut for the club on 23 September 2017 in a 2–0 home victory over FK Partizani Tirana. He was subbed on in the 73rd minute, replacing Gjergji Muzaka. He scored his first league goal for the club on 2 October 2017 in a 2–1 away victory over FK Kukësi. His goal, the first of the match, came in the 31st minute.

== Career statistics ==
As of 2 December 2017

Appearances and goals by club, season and competition
Club	Season	League			Cup		Europa		Total	
Club	Season	Division	Apps	Goals	Apps	Goals	Apps	Goals	Apps	Goals
Dinamo Tirana	2011–12	Albanian Superliga	12	0	1	0	—		13	0
Besa Kavajë	2012–13	Albanian Superliga	24	2	4	1	—		28	3
Besa Kavajë	2013–14	Albanian Superliga	29	2	1	0	—		30	2
Besa Kavajë	Total		53	4	5	1	—		58	5
Teuta Durrës	2014–15	Albanian Superliga	31	4	3	0	—		34	4
Teuta Durrës	2015–16	Albanian Superliga	26	5	3	0	—		29	5
Teuta Durrës	2016–17	Albanian Superliga	24	1	5	1	0	0	29	2
Teuta Durrës	Total		71	10	11	1	0	0	82	11
Skënderbeu Korçë	2017–18	Albanian Superliga	7	1	1	0	8 (Note: Appearances in UEFA Europa League)	0	16	1
Career total			153	15	18	2	8	0	179	17
