= Renato Hyshmeri =

Albanian footballer

Personal information
- Date of birth: 4 March 1989 (age 37)
- Place of birth: Elbasan, Albania
- Height: 1.79 m (5 ft 10 in)
- Position: Midfielder

Team information
- Current team: Sopoti

Youth career
- 2004–2006: Elbasani

Senior career*
Years	Team	Apps	(Gls)
2006–2011	Elbasani	97	(9)
2011–2013	Teuta Durrës	44	(4)
2013–2014	Partizani Tirana	16	(4)
2014–2015	Tirana	22	(2)
2015–2017	Bylis Ballsh	51	(6)
2017–2018	Elbasani	19	(0)
2018–2019	Trepça'89	23	(3)
2019	Dukagjini		
2019–2020	Elbasani	8	(1)
2021–2023	AF Elbasani		
2023–	Sopoti		

International career
2007–2009	Albania U19	6	(0)
- * Club domestic league appearances and goals as of 9 December 2019

Renato Hyshmeri (born 4 March 1989) is an Albanian professional footballer who plays as a midfielder for Sopoti.

== Club career ==
=== Partizani Tirana ===
On 23 July 2013, Hyshmeri joined newly promoted side Partizani Tirana on a free transfer, signing a contract which kept him at the club until July 2015. During the course of 2013–14 season, Hyshmeri appeared 25 league matches and 4 cup matches, scoring 4 goals, as Partizani finished 5th in the championship and was eliminated in the second round of 2013–14 Albanian Cup.

=== Tirana ===
Hyshmeri become a free agent after his departure from Partizani, and on 22 August 2014, completed a transfer to with their archrivals Tirana by signing a one-year contract ahead of the 2014–15 Albanian Superliga season. He made his debut just two days later in the opening game of the season in a 3–0 home win over Apolonia Fier, where he came on as an 81st-minute substitute and scored his first goal for the club. Following the match, Hyshmeri dedicated the goal to his coach Gugash Magani for "believing" in him and "giving him the opportunity" to debut in the match. He featured in 22 league games and scored twice during the 2014–15 season, but he only made 9 starts, as he was mainly used as a substitute by the head coach Magani. He left the club once his contract expired at the end of the season after making 28 appearances in all competitions and scoring two goals.

=== Bylis Ballsh ===
After leaving Tirana in the summer of 2015, he became a free agent and eventually signed a two-year contract with newly promoted Albanian Superliga side Bylis Ballsh on 24 July 2015. Hyshmeri made his debut on 23 August in team's opening league match of the season against Kukësi, starting and playing 63 minutes in an eventual 2–0 away defeat. From March 2016 to April 2016, Hyshmeri didn't play in any match and wasn't even on the bench. It was reported that he didn't train at all. It was alluded that relationship between Hyshmeri and club's directors was broken and Hyshmeri was towards departure. However he returned to the field on 25 April in the match against Laçi and concluded his first season by making 32 appearances between league and cup, as Bylis was relegated after one season.

=== Elbasani return ===
In September 2017, Hyshmeri returned to his boyhood club Elbasani, now at the third tier to give his contribution for the promotion of the team. On 8 October 2017, in the second matchday against Albpetrol, angry with a referee decision, Hyshmeri was sent off for unsportsmanlike conduct on referee. Disciplinary Committee suspended him with 10 matches.

=== Trepça'89 ===
On 7 July 2018, Hyshmeri was presented as the new player of Football Superleague of Kosovo's Trepça'89, rejoining his former manager Gugash Magani.

=== KF Dukagjini ===
In July 2019 Hyshmeri joined KF Dukagjini.

== International career ==
Hyshmeri has represent Albania at youth level, playing for under-19. He made his competitive debut with under-19 side on 18 October 2007 in a match against Spain valid for first qualifying round of UEFA European Under-19 Championship.

== Career statistics ==
As of 8 July 2018

Club	Season	League			Cup		Europe		Total	
Club	Season	Division	Apps	Goals	Apps	Goals	Apps	Goals	Apps	Goals
Elbasani	2006–07	Albanian Superliga	4	1	0	0	—		4	1
Elbasani	2007–08	Albanian Superliga	8	0	0	0	—		8	0
Elbasani	2008–09	Albanian Superliga	28	3	4	0	—		32	3
Elbasani	2009–10	Albanian First Division	13	3	0	0	—		13	3
Elbasani	2010–11	Albanian Superliga	28	0	0	0	—		28	0
Elbasani	Total		81	7	4	0	—		81	7
Teuta Durrës	2011–12	Albanian Superliga	23	3	4	0	—		27	3
Teuta Durrës	2012–13	Albanian Superliga	21	1	4	0	—		25	1
Teuta Durrës	2013–14	Albanian Superliga	—		—		2 (Note: All appearance(s) in UEFA Europa League)	0	2	0
Teuta Durrës	Total		44	4	8	0	2	0	54	4
Partizani Tirana	2013–14	Albanian Superliga	26	4	4	0	—		30	4
Tirana	2014–15	Albanian Superliga	22	2	6	0	—		28	2
Bylis Ballsh	2015–16	Albanian Superliga	28	1	4	0	—		32	1
Bylis Ballsh	2016–17	Albanian First Division	23	5	2	0	—		25	5
Bylis Ballsh	Total		51	6	6	0	—		57	6
Elbasani	2017–18	Albanian Second Division	19	0	0	0	—		19	0
Trepça'89	2018–19	Football Superleague of Kosovo	19	0	0	0	—		19	0
Career total			243	23	28	0	2	0	273	23
