= Stivi Frashëri =

Albanian footballer

Personal information
- Date of birth: 29 August 1990 (age 36)
- Place of birth: Korçë, PSR Albania
- Height: 1.91 m (6 ft 3 in)
- Position: Goalkeeper

Team information
- Current team: Liria Prizren
- Number: 77

Youth career
- 2005–2007: Skënderbeu Korçë
- 2007–2009: Aris

Senior career*
Years	Team	Apps	(Gls)
2009–2010	Aris	0	(0)
2010–2014	Bylis Ballsh	68	(0)
2014–2015	Tirana	33	(0)
2016	Bylis Ballsh	16	(0)
2016–2017	Flamurtari	11	(0)
2017–2019	Kukësi	41	(0)
2019–2021	Teuta	70	(0)
2021–2023	Ballkani	61	(0)
2023	Jeddah Club		
2024–	Liria Prizren	11	(0)

International career^{‡}
2006–2007	Albania U17	3	(0)
2008–2009	Albania U19	2	(0)
2010–2012	Albania U21	8	(0)
- * Club domestic league appearances and goals as of 15 June 2024 ‡ National team caps and goals as of 14 November 2014

Stivi Frashëri (born 29 August 1990) is an Albanian professional footballer who as a goalkeeper for Liria Prizren in the Kosovar Superliga.

== Club career ==
=== Early career ===
Frashëri joined the youth setup of his local side Skënderbeu Korçë as a 14-year-old, where he remained for two years until 2007, which was when he moved to Greece to sign for Aris. He joined the youth team at Aris Thessaloniki, but he was also invited to train with the first team after impressing in youth games for the club. He spent three years in Greece with Aris before leaving the club in the summer of 2010 with the desire to move back to Albania and play regular first team football for the first time in his career.

=== Bylis Ballsh ===
Frashëri joined newly promoted Albanian Superliga side Bylis Ballsh after returning to Albania, and he immediately established himself as a first team regular at the age of 20, despite competition from veteran goalkeeper and former Nigeria international Ndubuisi Egbo. In his debut season in Albania he made 22 league appearances out of a possible 33, as he helped his side finish in a respectable 6th out of 12 teams. The following season he remained the first choice goalkeeper, ahead of Ndubuisi Egbo once again and new signing Eduard Miço, as he featured in 15 out of 26 league games to help his side finish 6th out of 14 teams. His side struggled in a relegation battle during the 2012–13 season, but he managed to help Bylis Ballsh escape relegation by just a single point. After being knocked out of the Albanian Cup in the quarter finals in two consecutive campaigns, Frashëri helped his side reach the final against Laçi, which they ultimately lost as Frashëri conceded a goal in 119th minute of the game which had gone into extra time. The 2013–14 season proved to be one of the most difficult of his career, as he struggled to regain his place as first choice goalkeeper, and his side were disqualified from the Albanian Superliga due to an incident involving the club's president and Albanian Football Association officials that resulted in mass brawl. After the club was disqualified from the Albanian Superliga, Frashëri, much like the rest of the first team squad began looking for new clubs to join the following season.

=== Tirana ===
In June 2014 Tirana were looking for a concrete replacement of Ilion Lika who left for Flamurtari and they saw Frashëri as ideal replacement, where he was a Free agent. During the same month Kukësi, a fellow Albanian Superliga club, showed interest about him but he definitively was convinced to choose Tirana, where he declared that will sign for the club. He made his debut in the opening match of championship against newbie Apolonia Fier on 24 August, keeping a clean-sheet in a 3–0 win at Qemal Stafa Stadium.

In the Derby match against Partizani Tirana, Frashëri made a mistake during a shoot and the Partizani Tirana striker Stevan Račić scored a goal which resulted decisive for the match as Partizani Tirana won the match 1–2. He was criticised too much after the match, where the coach Gugash Magani declared that Frashëri cannot cope with such a pressure match. After that Frashëri was sit on the bench for next match and then in a status update in his Facebook fanpage, Frashëri accused KF Tirana and his teammates for being hardly offended by them. On 17 March 2015, KF Tirana announced to have suspend Frashëri for 3 months due to his accuses against the club. But despite this negative situation, Frashëri made a short declaration where he said that will not leave Tirana.

Then Frashëri returned to participate in the Albanian Cup match against Laçi on 8 April 2015, but just on the bench because Tirana gave the starting place Edvan Bakaj. He returned playing again in the starting line up on 9 May 2015 against Skënderbeu Korçë where he managed to keep the clean sheet in a goalless draw.

=== Return to Bylis Ballsh ===
On 31 January 2016, on the deadline day of that transfer window, Frashëri returned to Bylis Ballsh by signing a contract until the end of the season. He made his return debut on 6 February by keeping a clean sheet in team's 4–0 home victory against the fellow relegation strugglers Tërbuni Pukë. In the next match against his former employee Tirana, the players of Tirana refused to shake Frashëri's hand before the start of the match, which led FSHF to fine the club for its players behaviour. Frashëri played 16 matches until the end of the season, keeping seven clean sheets, which were not enough as Bylis Ballsh was relegated back to Albanian First Division after only one season.

=== Flamurtari Vlorë ===
On 2 September 2016, Frashëri joined Flamurtari as a free agent, signing until June 2017, rejoining his former Tirana boss Gugash Magani. After appearing in 11 league matches during the season, Frashëri left the team after the end of the season, where Flamurtari narrowly escaped relegation.

=== Kukësi ===
On 21 August 2017, Frashëri completed a transfer to fellow top flight side Kukësi by penning a two-year contract. He was brought as second choice keeper behind Enea Koliqi. After 10 matches on bench, he made his first league appearance of the season on 20 November by starting in the 1–2 home loss to Partizani Tirana.

== International career ==
=== Youth ===
Under-17

Frashëri was part of Albania under-17 squad in the qualifiers of 2007 UEFA European Under-17 Championship. He played in all three matches in Group 9, making his debut on 15 October in the 1–4 loss to Finland. Albania finished the group in last position with only one point.

Under-19

Frashëri received his first under-19 call-up to be part of squad in the 2009 UEFA European Under-19 Championship qualifying campaign. He played his first match on 8 October 2008 versus England which finished in the 3–0 loss. Then he made another appearance in Group 9, in the 5–0 loss to Serbia before making place for Elson Demi in the final match versus Northern Ireland.

Under-21

Frashëri was called up for the first time in the under-21 squad by coach Artan Bushati for 2011 UEFA European Under-21 Championship qualifying match against Azerbaijan on 4 September 2010, but he was an unused substitute behind the first choice Shpëtim Moçka.

In the next European U-21 tournament, the 2013 UEFA European Under-21 Championship qualification, Frashëri played every minute in all 8 matches of the Group 6.

=== Senior ===
Frashëri received his first senior call-up at the senior by coach Gianni De Biasi for the friendly matches against France and Italy on 14 and 18 November 2014 and this to replace the fellow Albanian Superliga goalkeeper of Partizani Tirana, Alban Hoxha, which had some issue family problems. He was an unused substitute as a 3rd choice 23rd shirt number behind of the starter Etrit Berisha and Orges Shehi for both matches.

== Career statistics ==
=== Club ===
As of 17 August 2021

Appearances and goals by club, season and competition
Club	Season	League			Cup		Europe		Other		Total	
Club	Season	Division	Apps	Goals	Apps	Goals	Apps	Goals	Apps	Goals	Apps	Goals
Aris	2009–10	Super League Greece	0	0	0	0	—		—		0	0
Bylis Ballsh	2010–11	Albanian Superliga	22	0	2	0	—		—		24	0
Bylis Ballsh	2011–12	Albanian Superliga	15	0	5	0	—		—		20	0
Bylis Ballsh	2012–13	Albanian Superliga	18	0	4	0	—		—		22	0
Bylis Ballsh	2013–14	Albanian Superliga	13	0	2	0	—		—		15	0
Bylis Ballsh	Total		68	0	13	0	—		—		81	0
Tirana	2014–15	Albanian Superliga	27	0	1	0	—		—		28	0
Tirana	2015–16	Albanian Superliga	6	0	1	0	—		—		7	0
Tirana	Total		33	0	2	0	—		—		35	0
Bylis Ballsh	2015–16	Albanian Superliga	16	0	—		—		—		16	0
Flamurtari Vlorë	2016–17	Albanian Superliga	11	0	4	0	—		—		15	0
Kukësi	2017–18	Albanian Superliga	9	0	6	0	—		—		15	0
Kukësi	2018–19	Albanian Superliga	32	0	8	0	5	0	—		45	0
Kukësi	2019–20	Albanian Superliga	—		—		2	0	—		2	0
Kukësi	Total		41	0	14	0	7	0	—		62	0
Teuta Durrës	2019–20	Albanian Superliga	34	0	5	0	—		—		39	0
Teuta Durrës	2020–21	Albanian Superliga	36	0	2	0	2	0	1	0	41	0
Teuta Durrës	2021–22	Albanian Superliga	—		—		6	0	—		6	0
Teuta Durrës	Total		70	0	7	0	8	0	1	0	86	0
Ballkani Suharekë	2021–22	Kosovar Superliga	0	0	0	0	—		—		0	0
Career total			239	0	40	0	15	0	1	0	295	0

=== International ===
As of 14 November 2014

Albania national team
Year	Apps	Goals
2014	0	0
Total	0	0

== Honours ==
Kukësi

- Albanian Cup: 2018–19

Teuta

- Albanian Cup: 2019–20
- Kategoria Superiore: 2020–21
- Albanian Supercup: 2020
