= Bledjan Rizvani =

Albanian footballer (born 1985)

Personal information
- Full name: Bledjan Rizvani
- Date of birth: 2 July 1985 (age 41)
- Place of birth: Durrës, PSR Albania
- Height: 1.76 m (5 ft 9 in)
- Position: Goalkeeper

Youth career
- 2000–2007: Teuta Durrës

Senior career*
Years	Team	Apps	(Gls)
2003–2016	Teuta Durrës	167	(0)
2003–2005	→ Erzeni Shijak (loan)	42	(0)
2017	Bylis Ballsh	8	(0)
2017–2018	Erzeni Shijak	1	(0)
- * Club domestic league appearances and goals as of 16 September 2017

Bledjan Rizvani (born 2 July 1985 in Durrës) is an Albanian professional footballer who most recently played as a goalkeeper for Albanian club Erzeni Shijak.

== Club career ==
=== Teuta Durrës ===
Rizvani was promoted to Teuta Durrës in the second part of 2002–03 season, failing to make a professional debut. In the next two seasons, he was sent on loan at Erzeni Shijak where he made 42 league appearances. Rizvani returned to Teuta in the summer of 2005 but made his debut only in the 2008–09 season where he collected 4 league appearances. He had his breakthrough season in 2009–10 season where he was the starting keeper, playing 16 matches and keeping 5 clean sheets.

Rizvani was distinguished for his performances in the 2011–12 season, as Teuta lost the championship to Skënderbeu Korçë for only one point. In July 2012, he was able to make his European debut as he played in both matches of 2012–13 UEFA Europa League first qualifying round against Metalurgi Rustavi as Teuta was eliminated 9–1 on aggregate.

In 2013 he was named the new captain of the team, replacing Arjan Sheta.

=== Bylis Ballsh ===
On 16 January 2017, Rizvani, after serving for 11 years, terminated his contract with Teuta and on the same day signed with Bylis Ballsh. The main reason of his departure was the limited time of playing he got in the recent seasons after losing his spot to Shpëtim Moçka.

=== Erzeni Shijak ===
In July 2017, Rizani returned to Erzeni Shijak but this time on permanent transfer. His made his first appearance of the season on 16 September in the 4–1 home win over Korabi Peshkopi, suffering an injury in the 61st minute which required substitution as he was unable to continue to play.

== Personal life ==
Rizvani married his partner Marsida in May 2014.

== Honours ==
=== Club ===
Teuta

- Albanian Superliga: Runner-up 2006–07, 2011–12
- Albanian Cup: Runner-up 2006–07

=== Individual ===
- Albanian Superliga Player of the Month: October 2013
