= Soroti–Katakwi–Moroto–Lokitanyala Road =

Ugandan road

Route information
- Length: 133 mi (214 km)
- History: Completion (Soroti–Katakwi–Moroto) in 2020

Major junctions
- South end: Soroti
- Katakwi; Napak; Moroto
- North end: Lokitanyala

Location
- Country: Uganda

Highway system
- Roads in Uganda

Soroti–Katakwi–Moroto–Lokitanyala Road is a road in the Eastern and Northern regions of Uganda. The road connects the urban centers of Soroti, the largest city in Teso sub-region, to Katakwi, the district headquarters of Katakwi District and to Moroto, the largest city in the Karamoja sub-region. It ends at Lokitanyala, at the international border with Kenya.

== Location ==
The road starts at Soroti and continues northeastwards through Katakwi, and on to Moroto. The distance between Soroti and Moroto is approximately 170 kilometres (106 mi).

At Moroto, the road takes a southeasterly direction for approximately 44 kilometres (27 mi), to end at Lokitanyala, for a total road distance of 214 kilometres (133 mi).

== Overview ==
Prior to 2016 this transport corridor posed serious challenges to residents and visitors, who endured the dust and potholes during the dry season. In the rainy season the road became a bog, with vehicles stuck in the mud for days, sometimes for weeks.

== Upgrading to bitumen ==
In November 2016, the upgrade of the road to grade II bitumen standard, with culverts, shoulders and drainage channels began. The work was contracted to China Communications Construction Company Limited (CCCC) and China Railway Group 3 Construction Company. The construction bill totaled USh646.8 billion (approx. US$175 million), funded by the government of Uganda and other development partners.

The work on the Soroti–Katakwi–Moroto section was completed in late 2019. Official handover to the Ugandan government is expected in 2020. As of January 2020, the road had been fully tarmacked from Soroti to Moroto, and was open to the public. The Moroto–Lokitanyala section is expected to be tarmacked during the 2020/2021 financial year that begins in July 2020.

On 21 November 2020, the government received the completed Soroti–Katakwi–Moroto section. Work on the Moroto–Lokitanyala section, measuring 44 kilometres (27 mi), was also flagged off, on the same day. President Yoweri Museveni presided over these events.

== See also ==
- Moroto District
- Katakwi District
- Soroti District
- Economy of Uganda
- List of roads in Uganda
