= Francis Olaki =

Ugandan footballer (born 1998)

Olaki Ronald Francis
Personal information
- Date of birth: 13 August 1998 (age 28)
- Place of birth: Katakwi
- Positions: Striker; left winger

Team information
- Current team: Super Eagles FC Lugongwe

Senior career*
Years	Team	Apps	(Gls)
2008–2011	Jogoo Young	40	(20)
2012–2014	Soana FC	30	(24)
2014–2015	KF Tirana	7	(1)
2015	KCCA FC	3	(0)
2015–2017	Soana FC	24	(8)
2017–2019	Extension Gunners FC	25	(12)
2021–2019	SC Villa	8	(0)
2022–2023	Buildcon F.C.	7	(3)

International career
2014–	Uganda	8	(1)
- * Club domestic league appearances and goals

Francis Ronald Olaki (born on 11 June 1995) is a Ugandan professional footballer who plays as a striker or left winger for Super Eagles FC Lugongwe in Uganda .

== Personal life ==
He is the younger brother of Emmanuel Okwi, a member of the Uganda national football team and currently playing for Simba Sports Club in Tanzania.
