= Katakwi General Hospital =

- Uganda Ministry of Health
- Location within Uganda

Geography
- Location: Katakwi, Katakwi District, Eastern Region, Uganda
- Coordinates: 01°55′03″N 33°57′44″E

Organisation
- Care system: Public
- Type: General

Services
- Emergency department: I
- Beds: 100

History
- Founded: 2011

Links
- Other links: Hospitals in Uganda

Katakwi General Hospital, also Katakwi Hospital is a government-owned hospital in the Eastern Region of Uganda.

== Location ==
The hospital is located in the central business district of the town of Katakwi, in Katakwi District, in the Teso sub-region, in Uganda's Eastern Region. This is approximately 52 kilometres (32 mi), northeast of Soroti Regional Referral Hospital, in the city of Soroti.

This is about 118 kilometres (73 mi) southwest of Moroto Regional Referral Hospital, in the city of Moroto. The coordinates of Katakwi General Hospital are: 01°55'03.0"N, 33°57'44.0"E (Latitude:1.917511; Longitude:33.962214).

== Overview ==
Katakwi General Hospital was established in 2004, as Katakwi Health Centre IV. In 2011, it was elevated to a full-fledged hospital, serving patients from Katakwi District and the neighboring districts of Amuria, Kapelebyong, Kumi, Nakapiripirit and Napak. Like many government hospitals in Uganda, the hospital is understaffed and underfunded.

== See also ==
- List of hospitals in Uganda
