= Erando Karabeci =

Albanian footballer

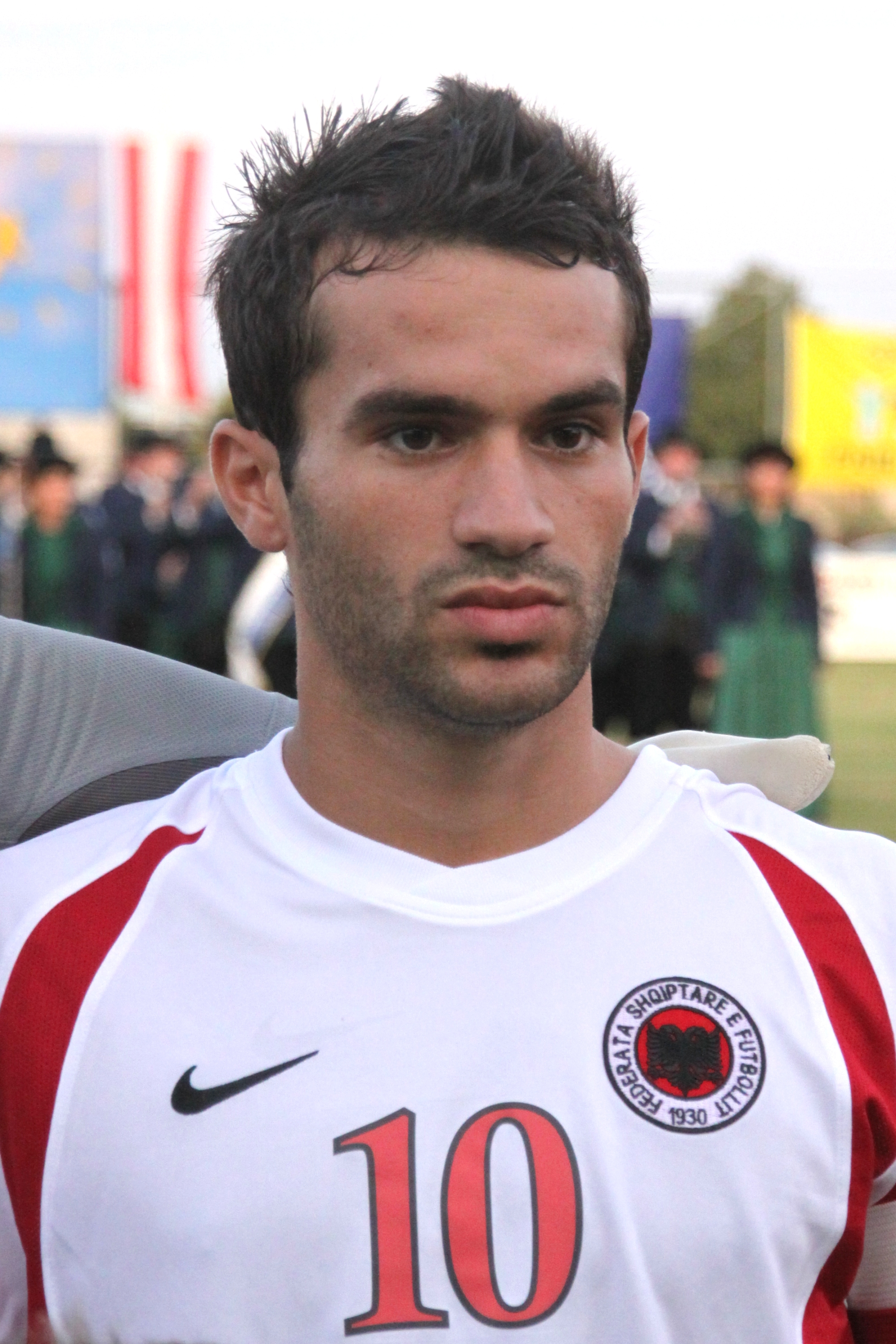
- Karabeci with Albania U21

Personal information
- Date of birth: 6 September 1988 (age 38)
- Place of birth: Tirana, Albania
- Height: 1.78 m (5 ft 10 in)
- Position: Midfielder

Team information
- Current team: Tirana
- Number: 13

Youth career
- 2000–2009: Partizani Tirana
- 2009: Tirana

Senior career*
Years	Team	Apps	(Gls)
2006–2009	Partizani Tirana	31	(2)
2009–2020	Tirana	272	(10)
2013	→ Kukësi (loan)	0	(0)
2020–2021	Teuta Durrës	23	(1)
2021–2022	Prishtina	26	(0)
2022–2025	Teuta Durrës	45	(3)
2025–2026	Tirana	3	(0)
2026	→Tirana B	2	(0)

International career^{‡}
2006	Albania U19	3	(0)
2007–2009	Albania U21	8	(1)
- * Club domestic league appearances and goals as of 25 March 2024 ‡ National team caps and goals as of 9 November 2014

Erando Karabeci (born 6 September 1988) is an Albanian professional footballer who plays as a midfielder for Tirana . He mainly operates in the centre of midfield, but he can also play out wide as well as in a more defensive role in the midfield.

== Club career ==
=== Early career ===
Born in Tirana, Albania, Karabeci first joined local side Partizani Tirana at the age of 11 in 2000, where he progressed to the under-17s and then the under-19s, where he won the national championship with both age groups. He was promoted to the senior side during the 2006–07 season, where he made his professional debut as an 18-year-old in a home tie against Shkumbini Peqin on 23 December 2006. Karabeci came off the bench in the 89th minute for Gerhard Progni in the 2–0 win. He made another two league appearances that season in home wins over Kastrioti Krujë and Shkumbini Peqin once again. The following season, he still didn't break into the first team and only managed 3 league appearances throughout the 2007–08 campaign, including coming off the bench in the closing stages of a memorable Tirana Derby which ended in a 4–1 win for Partizani.

His breakthrough season came in 2008 when Shpëtim Duro took charge of Partizani, and Karabeci became one of the club's regular midfielders alongside Artan Karapici, Dritan Babamusta and Viktor Gjyla. He scored his first professional goal in the Tirana Derby against Tirana on 7 December 2008 in a 2–2 draw. Partizani struggled throughout the season, which ended in them finishing third from bottom and having to play Kastrioti Krujë in a play-out game for a spot in the following season's Albanian Superliga. The play-out game with Kastrioti ended was surrounded by controversy and notoriety, as Partizani lost 1–0 and the club's president Albert Xhani attacked the referee Arjan Mali for disallowing a Partizani equaliser. Following the game Partizani were relegated to the Albanian First Division and Karabeci was allowed to terminate his contract and leave the club.

=== Tirana ===
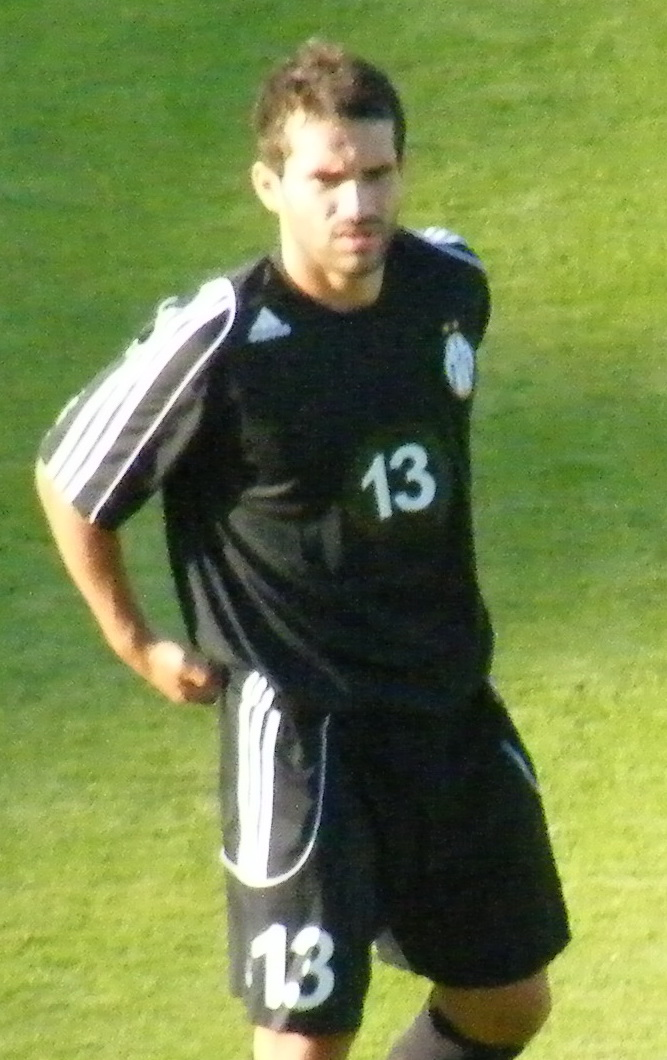
Karabeci playing for Tirana in 2010

On 28 August 2009, Karabeci signed for Albanian Champions Tirana. He joined up with the team ahead of the international break which he spent with the Albanian U21 side. On 13 September 2009, he made his first appearance with Tirana during the 0–1 away win against Gramozi Ersekë, entering in the field in the 70th minute in place of Enco Malindi. In the next league match against Besa Kavajë on 19 September, Karabeci made his first start and played full-90 minutes in a goalless draw at Qemal Stafa Stadium.

He signed short-term loan deal with Kukësi in July 2013 for their Europa League qualifying campaign, as a replacement for the suspended Besar Musolli.

On 18 December 2013, Karabeci scored his first goal with Tirana after his return from Kukësi during the 1–1 draw against Lushnja. On 7 February of the following year, he played full-90 minutes during the 1–0 triumph of Tirana against cross-town rivals of Partizani Tirana. He later scored his first league goal of the season, a long range strike in the 1–1 away draw against Teuta Durrës at Niko Dovana Stadium on 13 March. Tirana officially escaped relegation on 3 May 2014 in penultimate matchday after a 2–2 away draw against Flamurtari Vlorë, which Karabeci playing full-90 minutes. Karabeci concluded his 5th Tirana season by making 32 appearances between league and cup, scoring twice in the process.

Following the return of veteran Ervin Bulku in the summer of 2014, Karabeci handed his captaincy to Bulku as a sign of respect of the Albanian international, and became the vice-captain instead.

During the January 2015, Karabeci was named Albanian Superliga Player of the Month by the association "Sporti na bashkon". He scored his first goal of 2014–15 season against Apolonia Fier during the 2–2 draw at the neutral ground of Kastrioti Stadium, valid for the first leg of the quarter-final of Albanian Cup.

He ended the season with 37 appearances in all competitions, including 32 in the league, with Tirana who finished it in the fourth place and was eliminated in semi-finals of 2014–15 Albanian Cup against Laçi with the 1–0 aggregate.

He started the 2015–16 season by playing full-90 minutes in a 1–2 away win against the newcomers of Tërbuni Pukë on 23 August. In the next league match against Laçi at the neutral ground of Kastrioti Stadium, Karabeci scored a last-minute equaliser with a powerful shot that went in the triangle of Gentian Selmani's goal. On 21 September 2015, Karabeci made his 200th official appearance for Tirana during the 2–1 away league lose against Skënderbeu Korçë, assisting the goal of Masato Fukui in the 3rd minute.

Karabeci's 2016–17 season was marred by injures, as he was able to make only 23 league appearances without scoring. In January 2017, he suffered an injury while he has home which required surgery, keeping him sidelined for 2 months. He returned to action only on 31 March where he made a substitute appearance in the derby against Vllaznia Shkodër lost 1–2 at home. Tirana eventually ended the season by getting relegated for the first time in history after failing to win in the final matchday against Vllaznia Shkodër. In cup, Karabeci made 6 appearances, including the final, as Tirana was crowned the champions for a record 16th time after defeating Skënderbeu Korçë in the final.

Karabeci started the 2017–18 season by playing in the 2017–18 UEFA Europa League first qualifying round against Maccabi Tel Aviv. He played in both legs as Tirana was eliminated 5–0 on aggregate. On 6 September, Karabeci lifted Tirana's 11th Albanian Supercup trophy after defeating Kukësi 1–0 in the last minutes. Tirana also set a record by becoming the Albanian First Division side to win the Supercup. Karabeci scored the first goals of the season in the first leg of 2017–18 Albanian Cup first round against Besa Kavajë one week later. Three days later, he made his first ever Albanian First Division appearance in Tirana's 1–0 home win over Iliria Fushë-Krujë.

== International career ==
He was picked for the Albania U-21s by the coach Artan Bushati to help the team for the UEFA U-21 Championship qualifier and is still considered a very important part of the team. He even managed to score the winning goal in Albania U-21's qualifying game with Azerbaijan U-21 shortly after signing for his current club, KF Tirana.

He received his first call up to the senior Albania squad by coach Gianni De Biasi for the friendly matches against France and Italy on 14 and 18 November 2014. He was an unused substitute for both matches.

== Career statistics ==
=== Club ===
As of 23 September 2017

Club	Season	League			Cup		Continental		Other		Total	
Club	Season	Division	Apps	Goals	Apps	Goals	Apps	Goals	Apps	Goals	Apps	Goals
Partizani Tirana	2006–07	Albanian Superliga	3	0	0	0	—		—		3	0
Partizani Tirana	2007–08	Albanian Superliga	3	0	0	0	—		—		3	0
Partizani Tirana	2008–09	Albanian Superliga	25	1	5	1	0	0	—		30	2
Partizani Tirana	Total		31	1	5	1	0	0	0	0	36	2
Tirana	2009–10	Albanian Superliga	18	0	1	0	0	0	—		19	0
Tirana	2010–11	Albanian Superliga	30	0	7	0	4 (Note: All appearance(s) in UEFA Europa League)	1	0	0	41	1
Tirana	2011–12	Albanian Superliga	23	0	13	0	2	0	1 (Note: Appearance in Albanian Supercup)	0	39	0
Tirana	2012–13	Albanian Superliga	19	0	4	0	3	0	—		26	0
Kukësi (Note: Only for the UEFA Europa League campaign)	2013–14	Albanian Superliga	—		—		6	0	—		6	0
Tirana	2013–14	Albanian Superliga	28	1	4	0	—		—		32	2
Tirana	2014–15	Albanian Superliga	32	0	5	1	—		—		37	1
Tirana	2015–16	Albanian Superliga	33	1	5	0	—		—		38	1
Tirana	2016–17	Albanian Superliga	23	0	6	0	—		—		29	0
Tirana	2017–18	Albanian Superliga	9	4	3	2	2	0	1	0	15	6
Tirana	Total		217	6	45	3	11	1	2	0	275	11
Career total			248	7	50	4	17	1	2	0	317	13

== Honours ==
=== Club ===
KF Tirana

- Albanian Superliga: 2019–20
- Albanian Cup: 2010–11, 2011–12, 2016-17
- Albanian Supercup: 2011, 2012, 2017
- Albanian First Division : Winner Group B
- Albanian First Division : 2017-2018

KF Teuta

- Albanian Superliga: 2020–21
- Albanian Supercup: 2020

=== Individual ===
- Albanian Superliga Player of the Month: January 2015

Sporting positions
Preceded by Elvis Sina	Tirana captain 2013–2014	Succeeded by Ervin Bulku
Preceded by Ervin Bulku	Tirana captain 2016–	Succeeded by Incumbent
