= 2011–12 Kategoria e Parë =

Kategoria e Parë
- Season: 2011–12
- Champions: Luftëtari
- Promoted: Luftëtari; Kukësi
- Relegated: Gramozi; Vlora; Skrapari
- Matches: 240
- Goals: 618 (2.58 per match)
- Top goalscorer: Kreshnik Ivanaj (27)

The 2011–12 Kategoria e Parë was the 65th season of a second-tier association football league in Albania.

== Teams ==
The league was comprised fourteen teams, the teams ranked fifth through twelfth from the 2010–11 season, two relegated teams from the 2010–11 Kategoria Superiore, the two group winners of the 2010–11 Kategoria e Dytë, the two losing teams from the promotion/relegation playoffs between Kategoria e Parë and Kategoria Superiore teams and the two winning teams from the promotion/relegation playoffs between Kategoria e Parë and Kategoria e Dytë teams.

Pogradeci have earned direct promotion to the 2011–12 Kategoria Superiore season. They will be replaced by Elbasani, who were relegated at the end of the 2010–11 Kategoria Superiore season. Three additional directly promoted teams, as well as the other team to be directly relegated from the 2010–11 Kategoria Superiore, are yet to be determined.

Partizani were directly relegated to the 2011–12 Kategoria e Dytë after finishing the 2010–11 Kategoria e Parë season at the bottom of the table. The other team to be directly relegated, as well as both Kategoria e Dytë group winners, which will earn direct promotion, are yet to be determined.

== League table ==
| Pos | Team | Pld | W | D | L | GF | GA | GD | Pts | Promotion or relegation |
|---|---|---|---|---|---|---|---|---|---|---|
| 1 | Luftëtari (C, P) | 30 | 23 | 3 | 4 | 59 | 22 | +37 | 72 | Promotion to 2012–13 Kategoria Superiore |
| 2 | Kukësi (P) | 30 | 21 | 4 | 5 | 63 | 24 | +39 | 67 | Promotion to 2012–13 Kategoria Superiore |
| 3 | Lushnja | 30 | 19 | 7 | 4 | 49 | 16 | +33 | 64 | Play-off promotion to 2012–13 Kategoria Superiore |
| 4 | Besa (P) | 30 | 17 | 4 | 9 | 44 | 33 | +11 | 55 | Play-off promotion to 2012–13 Kategoria Superiore |
| 5 | Besëlidhja | 30 | 16 | 6 | 8 | 38 | 16 | +22 | 54 | Play-off promotion to 2012–13 Kategoria Superiore |
| 6 | Elbasani | 30 | 11 | 6 | 13 | 44 | 48 | −4 | 39 | |
| 7 | Burreli | 30 | 12 | 3 | 15 | 36 | 43 | −7 | 39 | |
| 8 | Gramshi | 30 | 10 | 8 | 12 | 37 | 44 | −7 | 38 | |
| 9 | Butrinti | 30 | 10 | 7 | 13 | 32 | 36 | −4 | 37 | |
| 10 | Ada | 30 | 9 | 9 | 12 | 34 | 35 | −1 | 36 | |
| 11 | Iliria | 30 | 11 | 3 | 16 | 38 | 44 | −6 | 36 | |
| 12 | Adriatiku | 30 | 10 | 4 | 16 | 35 | 48 | −13 | 34 | |
| 13 | Himara (O) | 30 | 9 | 5 | 16 | 38 | 43 | −5 | 32 | Play-out relegation to 2012–13 Kategoria e Dytë |
| 14 | Gramozi (R) | 30 | 9 | 2 | 19 | 25 | 60 | −35 | 29 | Play-out relegation to 2012–13 Kategoria e Dytë |
| 15 | Vlora (R) | 30 | 6 | 6 | 18 | 24 | 54 | −30 | 18 (Note: Vlora were deducted six points.) | Relegation to 2012–13 Kategoria e Dytë |
| 16 | Skrapari (R) | 30 | 4 | 9 | 17 | 22 | 52 | −30 | 18 (Note: Skrapari were deducted three points.) | Relegation to 2012–13 Kategoria e Dytë |

Source: Soccerway
Rules for classification: 1) points; 2) goal difference; 3) number of goals scored; 4) head-to-head points; 5) head-to-head goal difference; 6) draw. (Head-to-head record is applied for clubs with the same number of points only once all matches between said clubs have been played.)
(C) Champions; (O) Play-off winners; (P) Promoted; (R) Relegated

== Promotion playoffs ==
The third-, fourth- and fifth-placed Kategoria e Parë teams competed against the 10th-, 11th- and 12th-placed Kategoria Superiore sides in single match relegation playoffs.

18 May 2012
16:30

| Kamza | 0–2 | Besa |
|---|---|---|
| | Report | Rroshi 18'; Mihani 75' |

Skënderbeu Stadium, Korçë
Attendance: 1,500
Referee: Laver Alla

19 May 2012
16:30

| Tomori | 0–0 | Besëlidhja |
|---|---|---|
| | Report |
Penalties
| | 3–2 |

Qemal Stafa Stadium, Tirana
Attendance: 2,500
Referee: Emirjon Simo

20 May 2012
16:30

| Apolonia | 3–0 | Lushnja |
|---|---|---|
| Ribaj 27', 70'; Gerxho 85' | Report |

Niko Dovana Stadium, Durrës
Attendance: 5,000
Referee: Lorenc Jemini
