= Katakwi =

Town in Uganda

- Map of Uganda showing the location of Katakwi.
- Coordinates: 01°54′54″N 33°57′18″E
- Country: Uganda
- Region: Eastern Region of Uganda
- Sub-region: Teso sub-region
- District: Katakwi District
- Elevation: 1,100 m (3,600 ft)

Population (2020 Estimate)
  - Total: 9,100
- Time zone: UTC+3 (EAT)

Katakwi is a town in the Eastern Region of Uganda. It is the main municipal, administrative, and commercial center of Katakwi District and the site of the district headquarters.

== Location ==
Katakwi is approximately 52 kilometres (32 mi), by road, northeast of Soroti, the largest city in the Teso sub-region. It is about 153 kilometres (95 mi), by road, northwest of Mbale, the largest city in Uganda's Eastern Region. Katakwi is approximately 343 kilometres (213 mi), by road, northeast of Kampala, the capital of Uganda and its largest city. The coordinates of the town are 01°54'54.0"N, 33°57'18.0"E (Latitude:1.9150; Longitude:33.9550).

== Population ==
The 2002 national census estimated the town's population at 5,900. In 2010, the Uganda Bureau of Statistics (UBOS) estimated the population at 8,100. In 2011, the UBOS estimated the population at 8,400 people.

In 2015 the population of the town was projected at 8,000. In 2020 the mid-year population of Katakwi Town Council was projected at 9,100. It was calculated that the population of the town had increased at an average annual rate of 2.6 percent between 2015 and 2020.

Historical population
Year	Pop.	±%
2002	5,900	—
2010	8,100	+37.3%
2011	8,400	+3.7%
2015	8,000	−4.8%
2020	9,100	+13.7%

== Points of interest ==
The following additional points of interest lie within the town limits or close to the edges of town: (1) Stanbic Bank Uganda Limited maintains a branch in town (2) the offices of Katakwi Town Council (3) Katakwi central market (4) Katakwi General Hospital, a public hospital administered by the Uganda Ministry of Health (5) the Soroti–Katakwi–Moroto–Lokitanyala Road passes through the middle of town.

== See also ==
- Teso language
- List of cities and towns in Uganda
