= Edvan do Nascimento =

Brazilian footballer (born 1979)

Personal information
- Full name: Edvan Correia Edson do Nascimento
- Date of birth: 14 April 1979 (age 47)
- Place of birth: Recife, Brazil
- Height: 1.80 m (5 ft 11 in)
- Position: Midfielder

Senior career*
| Years | Team | Apps | (Gls) |
| 2000–2002 | Atlético CP | 31 | (1) |
| 2005 | Santa Cruz | | |
| 2008 | Serrano | | |
| 2008 | Universitatea Cluj | 11 | (0) |
| 2009 | Tököl VSK | 3 | (0) |
| 2009 | Silvania Șimleu Silvaniei | 10 | (1) |
| 2010 | Vera Cruz | | |
| 2010 | Barreiros | | |
| 2010 | Maria Linda | | |
| 2011 | Vitória Tabocas | 0 | (0) |
| 2013 | Chã Grande | 0 | (0) |
| 2014 | Vitória Tabocas | 0 | (0) |
| 2014 | Guarani Juazeiro | 0 | (0) |
| 2015 | Pesqueira | 0 | (0) |
| Total | | 55 | (2) |
- * Club domestic league appearances and goals

Edvan Correia Edson do Nascimento (born 14 April 1979) is a Brazilian former football player who played as a midfielder.

== Career ==
In 2008 Edvan was under contract with Romanian club Universitatea Cluj, for which he played 8 matches in Liga I and three in Liga II. In 2009 he played three games for Hungarian club Tököl VSK in the Nemzeti Bajnokság II, after which he returned to Romania at Silvania Șimleu Silvaniei, where he played 10 matches and scored one goal in Liga II. Edvan previously played for Santa Cruz in the Copa do Brasil.
