= Lokitanyala, Uganda =

- Location in Uganda
- Coordinates: 02°21′53″N 34°55′13″E
- Country: Uganda
- Region: Northern Region
- Sub-region: Karamoja sub-region
- District: Moroto District
  - Summer (DST): UTC2°21'53.0"N 34°55'13.0"E

Lokitanyala, Uganda is a settlement in the Moroto District in the Northern Region of Uganda. It lies directly across from Lokitanyala, Kenya, separated by the international border between Uganda and Kenya.

== Location ==
The settlement is in the Karamoja sub-region and is approximately 40 kilometres (25 mi), by road, southeast of Moroto, the nearest large town and the location of the district headquarters. The coordinates of Lokitanyala are 2°21'53.0"N, 34°55'13.0"E (Latitude:2.364728; Longitude:34.920284).

== Overview ==
The town is one of the end points of the 208 kilometres (129 mi) Soroti–Katakwi–Moroto–Lokitanyala Road. The town is a border crossing between Uganda and neighboring Kenya.

== See also ==
- List of roads in Uganda
- List of cities and towns in Uganda
