= Edvan (footballer) =

Brazilian footballer (born 1990)

Personal information
- Full name: Edvan França de Moraes
- Date of birth: September 27, 1990 (age 36)
- Place of birth: São Paulo, Brazil
- Height: 1.79 m (5 ft 10 1/2 in)
- Position: Right back

Team information
- Current team: Santo André

Youth career
- Grêmio Prudente

Senior career*
Years	Team	Apps	(Gls)
2010	Grêmio Prudente	1	(0)
2010	→ Cascavel (loan)		
2011	Santo André	3	(0)
2011	Sociedade Esportiva Platinense		
2012	Nacional FC		
2012–2013	Uberlândia EC		
2013	Nacional SP		
2013	Manaus		
2014	Uberlândia EC		
2014	Tombense	4	(0)
2015	Villa Nova	11	(1)
2015	Mirassol	0	(0)
2015	São Bernardo		
2016	Mirassol		
2016	Uberlândia EC	5	(0)
2016	Mogi Mirim	11	(0)
2016–2017	CA Juventus	16	(0)
- * Club domestic league appearances and goals as of 04:25, 7 April 2024 ‡ National team caps and goals as of October 16, 2010

Edvan França de Moraes, known as just Edvan born in São Paulo, is a right back who plays in the Santo André.

== Career ==
Edvan played for Grêmio Prudente.

=== Career statistics ===
(Correct as of October 16, 2010)

Club	Season	State League		Brazilian Série A		Copa do Brasil		Copa Libertadores		Copa Sudamericana		Total	
Club	Season	Apps	Goals	Apps	Goals	Apps	Goals	Apps	Goals	Apps	Goals	Apps	Goals
Grêmio Prudente	2010	1	0	-	-	-	-	-	-	-	-	1	0
Total		1	0	-	-	-	-	-	-	-	-	1	0

== See also ==
- Football in Brazil
- List of football clubs in Brazil
