= Alush Gavazaj =

Kosovo Albanian footballer

Personal information
- Full name: Alush Gavazaj
- Date of birth: 24 March 1995 (age 31)
- Place of birth: Prizren, FR Yugoslavia
- Height: 1.87 m (6 ft 2 in)
- Position: Defensive midfielder

Team information
- Current team: Ferizaj
- Number: 6

Youth career
- 2012–2014: Shkëndija Tiranë

Senior career*
Years	Team	Apps	(Gls)
2014–2016	Tirana	0	(0)
2015	→ Bylis (loan)	14	(0)
2015–2016	→ Tërbuni (loan)	32	(0)
2016–2017	Korabi Peshkopi	24	(0)
2017–2018	Liria Prizren	11	(0)
2018–2019	Feronikeli	11	(0)
2019–2020	Vushtrria	9	(0)
2020–2021	Renova	37	(1)
2021–2022	Bylis	10	(0)
2022	Vëllaznimi		
2022–2024	Malisheva	26	(2)
2024–	Ferizaj		
- * Club domestic league appearances and goals as of 3 August 2023 ‡ National team caps and goals as of 22 January 2018

Alush Gavazaj (born 24 March 1995) is a Kosovan professional footballer who plays as a defensive midfielder for First Football League of Kosovo club Ferizaj.

== Club career ==
=== Tirana ===
On 2 July 2014, Gavazaj joined Albanian Superliga side Tirana. On 1 October 2014, he made his debut with Tirana in a 2014–15 Albanian Cup first round match against Sopoti Librazhd after being named in the starting line-up.

==== Loan at Bylis Ballsh ====
On 2 February 2015, Gavazaj joined Albanian First Division side Bylis Ballsh, on a season-long loan.

==== Loan at Tërbuni Pukë ====
On 29 July 2015, Gavazaj joined Albanian Superliga side Tërbuni Pukë, on a season-long loan. On 23 August 2015, he made his debut with Tërbuni Pukë in a 2015–16 Albanian Superliga match against Tirana after being named in the starting line-up.

=== Korabi Peshkopi ===
On 2 September 2016, Gavazaj signed with the newly promoted team of Albanian Superliga side Korabi Peshkopi. On 28 September 2016, he made his debut with Korabi Peshkopi in a 2016–17 Albanian Cup first round match against Kamza after being named in the starting line-up.

== International career ==
On 22 January 2018. Gavazaj received a call-up from Kosovo for the friendly match against Azerbaijan. The match however was cancelled two days later, which prolonged his debut.
