= Lokitanyala, Kenya =

- Location in Kenya
- Coordinates: 02°21′49″N 34°55′26″E
- Country: Kenya
- County: West Pokot County
- Elevation: 5,125 ft (1,562 m)

Lokitanyala, Kenya is a settlement in the West Pokot County of Kenya. It sits across the international border from Lokitanyala, Uganda.

== Location ==
The settlement lies in West Pokot County, approximately 40 kilometres (25 mi), by road, southwest of Lorengippi, in neighboring Turkana County, the nearest large town. Lorengippi itself lies approximately 400 kilometres (249 mi), by road, northwest of Kapenguria, where the county headquarters of West Pokot County are located. The coordinates of Lokitanyala, Kenya are:2°21'49.0"N 34°55'26.0"E (Latitude: 2.363611; Longitude: 34.923889). The average elevation of the settlement is about 1,562 metres (5,125 ft) above sea level.

== Overview ==
Lokitanyala, Kenya is an important border crossing between Kenya and Uganda. Due to the poor state of roads on the Ugandan side, often vehicles have to cross into Kenya, then back into Uganda, while traveling between various Ugandan towns. This crossing is one of those used in intra-country and cross-border travel in this part of East Africa.
