= Kristjan Prendi =

Albanian footballer

Personal information
- Date of birth: 13 October 1997 (age 29)
- Place of birth: Tirana, Albania
- Position: Forward

Youth career
- 2009–2016: Tirana

Senior career*
Years	Team	Apps	(Gls)
2016–2018	Tirana	1	(0)
2016–2017	→ Bylis Ballsh (loan)	7	(3)
2017–2018	→ Korabi (loan)	20	(4)
2018–2020	Dinamo Tirana	16	(2)
2020	Korabi	10	(3)
2020	Korabi	0	(0)
- * Club domestic league appearances and goals

Kristjan Prendi (born 13 October 1997) is an Albanian former professional footballer who played as a forward.

== Club career ==
=== Early career ===
Prendi started his youth career with KF Tirana aged 12. He scored 1 goal on 11 February 2016 in the Albanian youth cup against Partizani Tirana U19.

In April 2016 Prendi was promoted to the senior team at KF Tirana by coach Ilir Daja.

== International career ==
Prendi received his first international call up at the Albania national under-21 football team by coach Alban Bushi for a gathering between 14 and 17 May 2017 with most of the players selected from Albanian championships.

== Honours ==
=== Club ===
Tirana

- Albanian Supercup: 2017
