= Emiliano Çela =

Albanian footballer

Personal information
- Date of birth: 21 July 1985 (age 41)
- Place of birth: Memaliaj, Albania
- Height: 1.82 m (6 ft 0 in)
- Position: Defender

Youth career
- –2003: Nacional Tiranë

Senior career*
Years	Team	Apps	(Gls)
2003	Partizani		
2004	Flamurtari		
2004–2006	Egnatia		
2006	Turbina		(3)
2007	Shkumbini		
2007–2008	Laçi		(6)
2008–2009	Lushnja	13	(0)
2009–2010	Laçi	30	(0)
2010–2012	Tomori	46	(3)
2012	Apolonia	6	(0)
2013–2016	Laçi	87	(7)
2016–2017	Korabi	21	(0)
2017–2021	Kastrioti	103	(5)
2021	Besa Kavajë	2	(0)

Managerial career
- 2021–2022: Kastrioti
- 2023: Kastrioti
- 2023: Flamurtari
- 2024: Kukësi
- 2024: Kukësi
- 2024-2025: Besa Kavajë
- 2025–2026: Pogradeci
- * Club domestic league appearances and goals

Emiliano Çela (born 21 July 1985) is an Albanian professional football coach and former player.

== Honours ==
KF Laçi

- Albanian Cup: 2012–13, 2014–15
