= Xhulio Jaupi =

Albanian footballer

Personal information
- Full name: Xhulio Jaupi
- Date of birth: 30 September 1992 (age 34)
- Place of birth: Dragot, Elbasan, Albania
- Position: Centre-back

Youth career
- Elbasani

Senior career*
Years	Team	Apps	(Gls)
2011–2016	Elbasani	70	(5)
2017	Shkumbini	5	(0)
2017–2018	Korabi	6	(1)
2018–2019	Elbasani	9	(0)
2019–2020	Turbina	13	(2)
Total		103	(8)
- * Club domestic league appearances and goals as of 20 May 2020

Xhulio Jaupi (born 30 September 1992) is a former Albanian professional footballer. He announced his retirement on 19 May 2020 at the age of 27, as he decided to move to Italy to be with his family.

== Honours ==
Elbasani

- Albanian First Division (1): 2013-14
