= Andi Ribaj =

Albanian footballer

Personal information
- Date of birth: 21 November 1989 (age 36)
- Place of birth: Vlorë, Albania
- Height: 1.83 m (6 ft 0 in)
- Position: Striker

Youth career
- 2002–2008: Apolonia Fier

Senior career*
Years	Team	Apps	(Gls)
2008–2013	Apolonia	83	(12)
2013–2014	Skënderbeu	42	(8)
2015–2015	Apolonia	17	(6)
2015–2016	Maccabi Kiryat Gat	29	(1)
2016–2017	Teuta	26	(4)
2017–2018	Vllaznia	31	(5)
2018–2023	Flamurtari	74	(12)

Managerial career
- 2026–: Flamurtari
- * Club domestic league appearances and goals as of 28 May 2023

Andi Ribaj (born 21 November 1989) is a retired Albanian professional footballer who played as a striker.

== Club career ==
In August 2013, Ribaj joined Skënderbeu on a two-year contract.

In January 2015, Ribaj made his return to Apolonia after one-and-a-half season by signed a six-month contract. He debuted for the first time after his return in the last day of the same month, starting and playing full-90 minutes in a 2–0 loss against Partizani.

On 3 August 2015, Ribaj moved for the first time abroad as he signed a three-year deal with Liga Leumit side Maccabi Kiryat Gat. He made his debut for the club on 21 August in the opening league match against Maccabi Ahi Nazareth, and scored his first goal three weeks later during the 1–2 home defeat to Hapoël Rishon LeZion. That was his only strike of the season, as he appeared in 29 league matches, in addition one cup match.

In September 2016, he was bought on trial by fellow Albanian Superliga club Partizani, playing a friendly match for reserve team against Dinamo Tirana. However, he was not offered a contract by the technical staff after failing impressing, and eventually ended up by penning a one-year contract with other top flight club Teuta.

Ribaj made his official debut on 12 October against his former side Skënderbeu, failing to score as Teuta slumped into a 1–0 away defeat. He scored his maiden Teuta goal later on 30 November in the matchday 13 against Flamurtari, netting his team's only goal in an eventual 1–2 home defeat. Then, he scored a brace in the 0–2 away win at Laçi to give Teuta three important points against the survival relegations rivals. Ribaj finished the season with 4 goals in 26 league appearances, collecting 1300 on the field as Teuta secured another season in the Albanian Superliga. He left the team after the end of the season.

In September 2017, Ribaj was close to a move to Kastrioti of Albanian First Division, but eventually joined Vllaznia in top flight on a one-year contract. He ended a barren run of 14 league games without a goal for Vllaznia on 16 December 2017, when he headed in against Kamza at Loro Boriçi Stadium to give the home side a 1–0 lead. The match finished 3–2 for Vllaznia.

Ribaj concluded his first and only season in Shkodër by scoring 5 goals in 31 league appearances, as Vllaznia was relegated for the first time in 60 years, just one year before the club's 100 anniversary.

In September 2018, Ribaj remained in top flight, signing a contract with Flamurtari. He scored his first goal for the club later on 17 February 2019 in a 2–0 home win over Skënderbeu.

== Career statistics ==
As of 17 February 2019

Club statistics
Club	Season	League			Cup		Europe		Other		Total	
Club	Season	Division	Apps	Goals	Apps	Goals	Apps	Goals	Apps	Goals	Apps	Goals
Apolonia	2009–10	Albanian Superliga	19	1	0	0	—		—		19	1
Apolonia	2010–11	Albanian First Division	13	2	0	0	—		—		13	2
Apolonia	2011–12	Albanian Superliga	25	1	5	4	—		1 (Note: Appearance in Albanian Superliga play-offs)	2	31	7
Apolonia	2012–13	Albanian Superliga	26	8	3	2	—		—		27	10
Apolonia	Total		83	12	8	6	—		1	2	92	20
Skënderbeu	2013–14	Albanian Superliga	31	8	6	0	2 (Note: All appearance(s) in UEFA Europa League)	1	1 (Note: Appearance in Albanian Supercup)	0	40	9
Skënderbeu	2014–15	Albanian Superliga	11	0	4	4	2 (Note: All appearance(s) in UEFA Champions League)	0	1	0	18	4
Skënderbeu	Total		42	8	10	4	4	1	2	0	58	13
Apolonia	2014–15	Albanian Superliga	17	6	2	1	—		—		19	7
Maccabi Kiryat Gat	2015–16	Liga Leumit	29	1	1	0	—		—		30	1
Teuta	2016–17	Albanian Superliga	26	4	5	0	—		—		31	4
Vllaznia	2017–18	Albanian Superliga	31	5	4	1	—		—		35	6
Flamurtari	2018–19	Albanian Superliga	10	1	1	0	—		—		11	1
Career total			238	37	31	12	4	1	3	2	276	52

== Honours ==
=== Club ===
Skënderbeu Korçë

- Albanian Superliga: 2013–14
- Albanian Supercup: 2013, 2014
