= Arian Sheta =

Albanian footballer

Personal information
- Date of birth: 13 February 1981 (age 45)
- Place of birth: Tirana, Albania
- Height: 1.87 m (6 ft 2 in)
- Position: Centre-back

Team information
- Current team: Përmeti

Senior career*
Years	Team	Apps	(Gls)
1997–1999	Partizani	32	(1)
2000	Teuta	10	(1)
2000–2002	Tirana	39	(0)
2003	Partizani	14	(1)
2004	Besa	14	(1)
2004–2005	Kallithea	10	(0)
2005–2006	Partizani	19	(0)
2006–2007	Ayia Napa	24	(2)
2007–2008	Elbasani	44	(1)
2009	Teuta	14	(0)
2009–2010	Partizani	28	(2)
2010–2013	Teuta	71	(5)
2013–2014	Kastrioti	25	(1)
2014–2016	Laçi	57	(3)
2016–2017	Korabi	17	(0)
2017	RKVSC	12	(1)
2018–2019	Dinamo Tirana	22	(1)
2019–2020	Besëlidhja	13	(1)
2024–	Përmeti		

International career
1999	Albania U18	3	(0)
1999–2003	Albania U21	13	(0)
2002	Albania	1	(0)
- * Club domestic league appearances and goals

Arian Sheta (born 13 February 1981) is an Albanian former professional footballer who played as a centre-back.

He also played for Kallithea FC in Greece, Ayia Napa FC in Cyprus and KS Elbasani in Albania.

== Club career ==
In June 2014, Sheta completed a transfer to fellow top flight side Laçi, signing only for the club's European matches in summer.

After initially announced his retirement, in April 2018, Sheta accepted an offer to join Dinamo Tirana in Albanian First Division on a one-year contract.

Ahead of the 2019–20 season, Sheta joined Albanian First Division club Besëlidhja Lezhë.

In 2024, he joined Përmeti in the Kategoria e Tretë.

== International career ==
Sheta earned his first and only cap for Albania senior team on 13 March 2002 in a friendly match against Mexico which ended in a 4–0 defeat.

== Honours ==
Teuta Durrës

- Albanian Cup: 1999–00

Tirana

- Albanian Superliga: 2000–01, 2001–02
- Albanian Cup: 2000–01, 2001–02
- Albanian Supercup: 2000

Laçi

- Albanian Cup: 2014–15
