= 2014–15 Kategoria Superiore =

Kategoria Superiore
- Season: 2014–15
- Dates: 23 August 2014 – 22 May 2015
- Champions: Skënderbeu; 6th Albanian title
- Relegated: Apolonia; Elbasani
- Champions League: Skënderbeu
- Europa League: Kukësi; Partizani; Laçi
- Matches: 180
- Goals: 377 (2.09 per match)
- Top goalscorer: Pero Pejić (21 goals)
- Biggest home win: Skënderbeu 6–0 Apolonia (23 November 2014)
- Biggest away win: Elbasani 1–5 Teuta (10 September 2014)
- Highest scoring: Kukësi 5-2 Teuta (4 March 2015)
- Longest winning run: Laçi (6)
- Longest unbeaten run: Skënderbeu (11)
- Longest winless run: Apolonia (16)
- Longest losing run: Apolonia (8)

The 2014–15 Kategoria Superiore was the 76th official season, or 79th season of top-tier football in Albania (including three unofficial championships during World War II) and the sixteenth season under the name Kategoria superiore. The season began on 23 August 2014 and ended on 22 May 2015.

== Teams ==
=== Stadia and last season ===
Locations of the 2014–15 Kategoria Superiore teams

Team	Location	Stadium	Capacity	Last season
Apolonia	Fier	Loni Papuçiu Stadium	6,800	Kategoria e Parë
Elbasani	Elbasan	Elbasan Arena	12,800	Kategoria e Parë
Flamurtari	Vlorë	Flamurtari Stadium	13,000	7th
Kukësi	Kukës	Zeqir Ymeri Stadium	10,000	2nd
Laçi	Laç	Laçi Stadium	11,000	3rd
Partizani	Tirana	Qemal Stafa Stadium	20,000	5th
Skënderbeu	Korçë	Skënderbeu Stadium	12,000	Champions
Teuta	Durrës	Niko Dovana Stadium	13,000	4th
Tirana	Tirana	Selman Stërmasi Stadium	12,500	6th
Vllaznia	Shkodër	Loro Boriçi Stadium	16,000	8th

=== Personnel and kits ===
Note: Flags indicate national team as has been defined under FIFA eligibility rules. Players and Managers may hold more than one non-FIFA nationality.

Team	Manager	Captain	Kit manufacturer	Shirt sponsor
Apolonia	(Albania) Artan Mërgjyshi	(Albania) Amarildo Dimo	Givova	—
KF Elbasani	(Albania) Ilirjan File	(Albania) Eriol Merxha	Givova	Xhanini
Flamurtari	(Italy) Ernestino Ramella	(Albania) Franc Veliu	Lescon	TRK/Atlasjet
FK Kukësi	(North Macedonia) Artim Šakiri	(Albania) Rrahman Hallaçi	Adidas	Kevin Construction
KF Laçi	(Albania) Armando Cungu	(Croatia) Stipe Buljan	Sportika	Top Sport
Partizani	(Albania) Shpëtim Duro	(North Macedonia) Nderim Nexhipi	Legea	—
Skënderbeu	(Albania) Mirel Josa	(Albania) Bledi Shkëmbi	Legea	Ama Cafè
Teuta	(Albania) Ilir Biturku	(Albania) Bledjan Rizvani	Erreà	Caffè Pascucci
KF Tirana	(Albania) Gugash Magani	(Albania) Ervin Bulku	Legea	—
Vllaznia	(Italy) Baldo Ranieri	(Albania) Ndriçim Shtubina	Givova	–

== League table ==
Pos	Team	Pld	W	D	L	GF	GA	GD	Pts	Qualification or relegation
1	Skënderbeu (C)	36	24	7	5	58	18	+40	79	Qualification for the Champions League second qualifying round
2	Kukësi	36	23	6	7	59	27	+32	75	Qualification for the Europa League first qualifying round
3	Partizani	36	22	7	7	42	24	+18	73	Qualification for the Europa League first qualifying round
4	Tirana	36	21	8	7	47	27	+20	71	
5	Laçi	36	20	9	7	46	19	+27	69	Qualification for the Europa League first qualifying round (Note: Laçi qualified for the UEFA Europa League first qualifying round by winning the 2014–15 Albanian Cup.)
6	Flamurtari	36	10	8	18	29	37	−8	38	
7	Vllaznia (Note: Vllaznia were deducted three points.)	36	11	5	20	27	41	−14	35	
8	Teuta	36	9	2	25	31	54	−23	29	
9	Apolonia (R)	36	7	4	25	19	56	−37	25	Relegation to the 2015–16 Kategoria e Parë
10	Elbasani (R)	36	4	2	30	19	74	−55	14	Relegation to the 2015–16 Kategoria e Parë

Source: Albanian Football Association (in Albanian), Soccerway
Rules for classification: 1) points; 2) points in head-to-head matches; 3) goal difference in head-to-head matches; 4) goals scored in head-to-head matches; 5) total goal difference; 6) total goals scored; 7) draw
(C) Champions; (R) Relegated

== Results ==
Each team plays every opponent four times, twice at home and twice away, for a total of 36 games.

=== First half of season ===
Home \ Away	APO	ELB	FLA	KUK	LAÇ	PAR	SKË	TEU	TIR	VLL
Apolonia		0–1	1–1	0–1	0–2	1–0	0–0	1–0	0–3	0–1
Elbasani	2–0		0–2	0–2	0–2	0–1	0–1	1–5	2–3	1–4
Flamurtari	3–0	2–0		0–1	1–1	1–0	1–1	2–1	0–0	0–0
Kukësi	0–0	3–0	2–0		1–0	0–1	1–0	1–0	1–0	2–1
Laçi	3–1	1–0	1–1	0–0		1–1	0–2	3–0	2–0	3–0
Partizani	1–0	1–0	0–0	2–0	2–0		1–0	2–0	2–0	0–1
Skënderbeu	6–0	1–0	1–0	2–0	2–0	3–0		3–2	0–0	3–0
Teuta	1–0	0–2	1–0	0–3	0–0	0–1	2–0		0–1	0–1
Tirana	3–0	2–1	1–0	3–1	0–0	0–0	2–0	4–2		1–0
Vllaznia	2–0	1–0	1–0	1–2	1–0	0–1	0–1	1–2	1–1	

Source: Albanian Football Association
Legend: Blue = home team win; Yellow = draw; Red = away team win.

=== Second half of season ===
Home \ Away	APO	ELB	FLA	KUK	LAÇ	PAR	SKË	TEU	TIR	VLL
Apolonia		4–1	2–1	2–2	1–4	0–2	0–1	2–1	0–2	2–0
Elbasani	0–1		0–1	0–4	0–2	0–3	1–4	1–0	1–3	1–1
Flamurtari	1–0	2–1		1–2	0–2	0–1	0–1	2–1	1–2	3–0
Kukësi	2–1	3–0	4–0		0–0	3–0	0–1	5–2	4–1	1–0
Laçi	2–0	2–0	2–1	2–1		1–1	1–0	1–0	3–0	1–0
Partizani	1–0	4–1	2–1	1–1	1–0		0–0	2–1	2–2	1–0
Skënderbeu	1–0	5–1	2–0	1–1	0–0	5–2		4–2	1–0	3–1
Teuta	1–0	1–0	1–0	1–3	1–3	1–0	0–1		0–0	2–1
Tirana	2–0	2–0	1–0	2–0	1–0	1–2	0–0	1–0		2–1
Vllaznia	2–0	1–1	1–1	1–2	0–1	1–0	0–2	1–0	0–1	

Source: Albanian Football Association
Legend: Blue = home team win; Yellow = draw; Red = away team win.

== Season statistics ==
=== Scoring ===
==== Top scorers ====
As of 17 May 2015

Rank	Player	Team	Goals
1	(Croatia) Pero Pejić	Kukësi	31
2	(Serbia) Stevan Račić	Partizani	14
3	(Albania) Elis Bakaj	Tirana	12
4	(Nigeria) Segun Adeniyi	Laçi	10
5	(Burundi) Selemani Ndikumana	Tirana	9
6	(Kosovo) Mentor Mazrekaj	Partizani	8
7	(Montenegro) Marko Ćetković	Laçi	7
7	(Brazil) Dhiego Martins	Skënderbeu	7
7	(Albania) Agim Meto	Laçi	7
7	(Uruguay) Sebastián Sosa	Vllaznia	7

=== Hat-trick ===
Player	For	Against	Result	Date
(Brazil) Dhiego Martins	Skënderbeu	Apolonia	6–0	23 November 2014
(Croatia) Pero Pejić	Kukësi	Elbasani	3–0	31 January 2015
(Croatia) Pero Pejić	Kukësi	Teuta	2–3	9 May 2015
(Albania) Andi Ribaj	Apolonia	Elbasani	2–3	9 May 2015
(Croatia) Pero Pejić	Kukësi	Tirana	2–3	17 May 2015

=== Clean sheets ===
Rank	Player	Club	Clean sheets
1	(Albania) Orges Shehi	Skënderbeu	18
2	(Montenegro) Miroslav Vujadinović	Laçi	16
2	(Albania) Argjent Halili	Kukësi	16
4	(Albania) Alban Hoxha	Partizani	15
5	(Albania) Stivi Frashëri	Tirana	14
6	(Albania) Erind Selimaj	Vllaznia	11
7	(Albania) Ilion Lika	Flamurtari	7
8	(Albania) Bledjan Rizvani	Teuta	6

=== Scoring ===
- First goal of the season: Fatjon Sefa for Skënderbeu against KF Elbasani (23 August 2014)
- Fastest goal of the season: 12 seconds Stevan Račić for Partizani against KF Elbasani(20 December 2014)

=== Discipline ===
==== Player ====
As of 12 March 2015

- Most yellow cards: 11
  - Bruno Telushi (Flamurtari)
- Most red cards: 2
  - Ervin Bulku (KF Tirana)
  - Xhulio Jaupi (KF Elbasani)
  - Gledi Mici (Flamurtari)

==== Club ====
As of 21 December 2014

- Most red cards: 8
  - Skënderbeu

== Attendances ==
Club	Lowest attendance	Highest attendance	Average attendance
Vllaznia	2,500	8,000	5,550
KF Tirana	3,000	5,300	4,433
Partizani	2,500	11,800	4,367
Skënderbeu	400	7,000	3,237
Flamurtari	1,500	4,300	3,144
FK Kukësi	800	4,000	2,022
Apolonia	500	3,500	1,500
KF Elbasani	300	2,850	1,467
Teuta	200	2,500	1,200
KF Laçi	300	1,800	828

== Awards ==
Monthly awards

Month	Player of the Month		
Month	Player	Club	Ref
September	(Serbia) Stevan Račić	Partizani	
October	(Albania) Elis Bakaj	KF Tirana	
January	(Albania) Erando Karabeci	KF Tirana	
March	(Albania) Alban Hoxha	Partizani	
