= Julian Gërxho =

Albanian footballer

Julian Gerxho
Personal information
- Full name: Julian Gerxho
- Date of birth: 21 January 1985 (age 41)
- Place of birth: Fier, Albania
- Height: 1.80 m (5 ft 11 in)
- Position: Striker

Youth career
- 2000–2003: Apolonia

Senior career*
Years	Team	Apps	(Gls)
2003–2007	Apolonia	50	(5)
2007–2008	Elbasani	6	(0)
2008–2009	Shkumbini	21	(0)
2009–2012	Apolonia	77	(20)
2012–2014	Bylis	26	(5)
2014–2015	Apolonia	22	(0)
2015	Tërbuni	14	(0)
2016–2017	Dinamo Tirana	38	(8)
2017–2018	Turbina	13	(3)
- * Club domestic league appearances and goals as of 18 February 2016

Julian Gerxho (born 21 January 1985 in Fier) is an Albanian retired football player who played amongst others for Dinamo Tirana in the Albanian First Division as a striker.

== Club career ==
=== Tërbuni Pukë ===
On 17 July 2015, Gërxho signed with the newly promoted club Tërbuni Pukë for an undisclosed fee, and was allocated squad number 20 for the upcoming 2015–16 season. In Tërbuni's first ever Albanian Superliga match against Tirana, Gërxho played as a starter but was substituted in the 73rd minute for Tusha in an eventual 1–2 home loss.

=== Dinamo Tirana ===
On 20 January 2016, Gërxho left Tërbuni and joined Albanian First Division side as well as the second-most successful club in Albania Dinamo Tirana until the end of the season. He was assigned the vacant number 10 and made his Dinamo Tirana debut on 13 February in a 1–0 away defeat to Butrinti Sarandë.

== Honours ==
Bylis Ballsh

- Albanian Cup: Runner-up 2012–13
