= 2013–14 Kategoria Superiore =

Kategoria Superiore
- Season: 2013–14
- Dates: 31 August 2013 – 10 May 2014
- Champions: Skënderbeu; 5th Albanian title
- Relegated: Bylis; Lushnja; Kastrioti; Besa
- Champions League: Skënderbeu
- Europa League: Kukësi; Laçi; Flamurtari
- Matches: 198
- Goals: 453 (2.29 per match)
- Top goalscorer: Pero Pejić (20 goals)
- Best goalkeeper: Alban Hoxha (14 clean sheets)
- Biggest home win: Laçi 6–0 Kastrioti (4 May 2014)
- Highest scoring: Teuta 6–2 Lushnja (2 February 2014)
- Longest winning run: 6 games Tirana
- Highest attendance: 11,000; Tirana 1–0 Partizani (7 February 2014)

The 2013–14 Kategoria Superiore was the 75th official season (or 78th season overall, including three unofficial championships during World War II) of top-tier football in Albania and the sixteenth season under the name Kategoria superiore. The season began on 31 August 2013 and ended on 10 May 2014.

== Teams ==
=== Stadia and last season ===
Locations of the 2013–14 Kategoria Superiore teams

Team	Location	Stadium	Capacity	Last season
Besa	Kavajë	Besa Stadium	19,000	9th
Bylis Ballsh	Ballsh	Adush Muça Stadium	15,200	10th
Flamurtari	Vlorë	Flamurtari Stadium	13,000	4th
Kastrioti	Krujë	Kastrioti Stadium	10,000	8th
Kukësi	Kukës	Zeqir Ymeri Stadium	10,000	2nd
Laçi	Laç	Laçi Stadium	11,000	7th
Lushnja	Lushnjë	Abdurrahman Roza Haxhiu Stadium	12,000	Kategoria e Parë
Partizani	Tirana	Qemal Stafa Stadium	20,000	Kategoria e Parë
Skënderbeu	Korçë	Skënderbeu Stadium	12,000	Champions
Teuta	Durrës	Niko Dovana Stadium	13,000	3rd
Tirana	Tirana	Selman Stërmasi Stadium	12,500	5th
Vllaznia	Shkodër	Loro Boriçi Stadium	16,000	6th

=== Personnel and kits ===
Note: Flags indicate national team as has been defined under FIFA eligibility rules. Players and Managers may hold more than one non-FIFA nationality.

Team	Manager	Captain	Kit manufacturer	Shirt sponsor
Besa Kavajë	(Albania) Artan Mërgjyshi	(Albania) Erand Hoxha	GLA Sport	Veneto Banca
Bylis Ballsh	(Nigeria) Ndubuisi Egbo	(Albania) Bekim Kuli	Adidas	Gjanica
Flamurtari Vlorë	(Albania) Ernest Gjoka	(Albania) Franc Veliu	Lescon	TRK/Atlasjet
Kastrioti Krujë	(Albania) Ramadan Ndreu	(Albania) Fatmir Caca	GLA Sport	—
FK Kukësi	(Albania) Armando Cungu	(Albania) Gerhard Progni	Adidas	Kevin Construction
KF Laçi	(Albania) Stavri Nica	(Albania) Erjon Vuçaj	Sportika	Top Sport/Baste Live
KS Lushnja	(Albania) Artan Bano	(Albania) Gentian Çela	Legea	—
Partizani Tirana	(Albania) Hasan Lika	(Albania) Alban Hoxha	Legea	Albtelecom
Skënderbeu Korçë	(Albania) Mirel Josa	(Albania) Bledi Shkëmbi	Legea	Ama Caffe
Teuta Durrës	(Albania) Gugash Magani	(Albania) Bledjan Rizvani	Adidas	—
KF Tirana	(Albania) Nevil Dede	(Albania) Erando Karabeci	Legea	—
Vllaznia Shkodër	(Albania) Agim Canaj	(Albania) Ervis Kraja	Onze	Grand Europa Resort

=== Managerial changes ===
Team	Outgoing manager	Manner of departure	Date of vacancy	Incoming manager	Date of appointment
FK Kukësi	(Albania) Armando Cungu	Resigned	3 October 2013	(Turkey) Naci Şensoy	4 October 2013
KF Tirana	(Albania) Nevil Dede	Sacked	24 October 2013	(Albania) Alpin Gallo	24 October 2013
Kastrioti Krujë	(Albania) Ramadan Ndreu	Resigned	10 November 2013	(Albania) Kristaq Mile	15 November 2013
Teuta Durrës	(Albania) Gugash Magani	Mutual agreement	17 November 2013	(Italy) Roberto Sorrentino	17 November 2013
KF Tirana	(Albania) Alpin Gallo	Resigned	28 November 2013	(Albania) Sokol Bulku	28 November 2013
KF Tirana	(Albania) Sokol Bulku	Sacked	1 December 2013	(Albania) Gugash Magani	1 December 2013
Kastrioti Krujë	(Albania) Kristaq Mile	Resigned	8 December 2013	(Albania) Ramadan Ndreu	10 November 2013
Partizani Tirana	(Albania) Hasan Lika	Resigned	8 February 2014	(Portugal) Márcio Sampaio	9 February 2014
FK Kukësi	(Turkey) Naci Şensoy	Resigned	10 February 2014	(Albania) Sulejman Starova	10 February 2014
Kastrioti Krujë	(Albania) Ramadan Ndreu	Mutual agreement	17 February 2014	(Albania) Nevil Dede	17 February 2014
Teuta Durrës	(Italy) Roberto Sorrentino	Sacked	24 February 2014	(Albania) Ilir Daja	24 February 2014
Teuta Durrës	(Albania) Ilir Daja	End of tenure as a caretaker	27 February 2014	(Albania) Ilir Biturku	27 February 2014
Vllaznia Shkodër	(Albania) Agim Canaj	Resigned	10 March 2014	(Albania) Samuel Nikaj	11 March 2014
Vllaznia Shkodër	(Albania) Samuel Nikaj	End of tenure as a caretaker	18 March 2014	(Montenegro) Derviš Hadžiosmanović	18 March 2014

== League table ==
Pos	Team	Pld	W	D	L	GF	GA	GD	Pts	Qualification or relegation
1	Skënderbeu (C)	33	18	7	8	52	32	+20	61	Qualification for the Champions League second qualifying round
2	Kukësi	33	16	9	8	46	34	+12	57	Qualification for the Europa League first qualifying round
3	Laçi	33	16	6	11	41	28	+13	54	Qualification for the Europa League first qualifying round
4	Teuta	33	14	12	7	46	35	+11	54	
5	Partizani	33	15	8	10	33	26	+7	53	
6	Tirana	33	14	8	11	36	31	+5	50	
7	Flamurtari (Note: Flamurtari were deducted three points.)	33	14	9	10	45	40	+5	48	Qualification for the Europa League first qualifying round
8	Vllaznia	33	12	9	12	42	36	+6	45	
9	Besa (Note: Besa were deducted three points.) (R)	33	11	9	13	34	32	+2	39	Relegation to the 2014–15 Kategoria e Parë
10	Kastrioti (R)	33	8	5	20	26	46	−20	29	Relegation to the 2014–15 Kategoria e Parë
11	Lushnja (R)	33	7	5	21	32	59	−27	26	Relegation to the 2014–15 Kategoria e Parë
12	Bylis (Note: Bylis was excluded from the league and relegated to the Albanian First Division for the next season, after a violent incident during a match against Laçi in the 24th round.) (R)	33	5	9	19	20	54	−34	24	Relegation to the 2014–15 Kategoria e Parë

Source: Albanian Football Association (in Albanian), Soccerway
Rules for classification: 1) points; 2) points in head-to-head matches; 3) goal difference in head-to-head matches; 4) goals scored in head-to-head matches; 5) total goal difference; 6) total goals scored; 7) draw
(C) Champions; (R) Relegated

== Results ==
The schedule consisted of three rounds. During the first two rounds, each team played each other once home and away for a total of 22 matches. The pairings of the third round were then set according to the standings after the first two rounds, giving every team a third game against each opponent for a total of 33 games per team.

=== First and second round ===
Home \ Away	BES	BYL	FLA	KAS	KUK	LAÇ	LUS	PAR	SKË	TEU	TIR	VLL
Besa		2–1	2–0	1–0	2–0	2–2	1–1	0–1	1–1	2–2	1–0	1–0
Bylis	3–0		0–0	1–0	1–1	1–0	1–1	1–0	1–0	2–2	0–1	0–0
Flamurtari	1–4	2–2		0–1	2–1	1–1	4–3	1–0	2–1	2–0	1–1	3–1
Kastrioti	2–1	2–1	0–0		0–1	0–2	2–0	0–2	0–1	0–0	0–0	3–2
Kukësi	1–1	0–0	3–2	1–0		1–0	1–0	0–1	1–1	0–0	2–1	1–3
Laçi	1–0	1–0	1–0	1–0	1–2		3–1	1–0	2–2	2–1	1–0	3–0
Lushnja	1–0	2–0	2–4	0–0	1–0	1–0		2–0	0–1	1–1	2–1	1–1
Partizani	3–1	2–2	0–0	1–0	0–0	2–1	2–0		0–0	3–0	1–0	0–1
Skënderbeu	1–0	2–1	2–0	2–0	1–3	2–1	2–0	3–0		1–1	1–0	2–1
Teuta	0–1	2–1	2–1	1–2	2–1	2–1	6–2	1–1	1–1		2–0	3–2
Tirana	2–1	1–0	0–2	1–0	3–1	0–0	1–0	1–0	0–2	0–0		1–1
Vllaznia	0–0	1–1	0–1	2–1	1–2	3–0	2–0	1–1	1–3	1–1	2–0	

Source: Albanian Football Association
Legend: Blue = home team win; Yellow = draw; Red = away team win.

=== Third round ===
Home \ Away	BES	BYL	FLA	KAS	KUK	LAÇ	LUS	PAR	SKË	TEU	TIR	VLL
Besa			3–1	1–1	0–1	0–0	3–0					0–0
Bylis	0–3 (Note: Match awarded as Bylis excluded from the league.)				0–3	0–3 (Note: Match awarded due to the violent incidents of Bylis fans.)	0–3				0–3	
Flamurtari		3–0						0–0	1–0	0–0	2–2	
Kastrioti		3–0	1–3				2–1				2–3	2–4
Kukësi			4–2	2–1		1–1	4–1			3–0		1–1
Laçi			0–1	6–0			1–0	2–0		1–0		0–2
Lushnja			2–3					2–4	2–4	0–2		0–2
Partizani	1–0	2–0		1–0	1–0				1–2		1–1	
Skënderbeu	1–0	3–0		3–1	3–3	1–2					2–3	
Teuta	1–0	3–0		1–0				3–1	2–1		1–1	
Tirana	3–0 (Note: Match awarded as Besa not showing up for the match.)				1–2	2–0	1–0					2–1
Vllaznia		3–0	1–0					0–1	1–0	1–3		

Source: Albanian Football Association
Legend: Blue = home team win; Yellow = draw; Red = away team win.

== Season statistics ==
=== Scoring ===
- First goal of the season: Renato Hyshmeri for Partizani Tirana against Kastrioti Krujë (31 August 2013)
- Largest winning margin: 6 goals
  - KF Laçi 6-0 Kastrioti Krujë (4 May 2014)
- Highest scoring game: 8 goals
  - Teuta Durrës 6-2 KS Lushnja (2 February 2014)
- Most goals scored in a match by a single team: 6 goals
  - Teuta Durrës 6-2 KS Lushnja (2 February 2014)
  - KF Laçi 6-0 Kastrioti Krujë (4 May 2014)
- Most goals scored in a match by a losing team: 3 goals
  - Flamurtari Vlorë 4-3 KS Lushnja (10 November 2013)

==== Top scorers ====
As of 1 July 2014

Rank	Player	Team	Goals
1	(Croatia) Pero Pejić	Skënderbeu Korçë	20
2	(Albania) Sokol Cikalleshi	FK Kukësi	17
3	(Albania) Daniel Xhafaj	Teuta Durrës	14
4	(Croatia) Tomislav Bušić	Vllaznia Shkodër	13
4	(Albania) Fatjon Sefa	Besa Kavajë	13
5	(Albania) Arber Abilaliaj	Flamurtari Vlorë	12
6	(Albania) Mikel Canka	KS Lushnja	8
6	(Albania) Andi Ribaj	Skënderbeu Korçë	8
6	(Albania) Erjon Vuçaj	KF Laçi	8
7	(Nigeria) Solomonson Izuchukwuka	Bylis Ballsh/FK Kukësi	7
7	(Albania) Mario Morina	Skënderbeu Korçë/KF Tirana	7
7	(Albania) Bledi Shkëmbi	Skënderbeu Korçë	7
7	(Albania) Ndriçim Shtubina	Vllaznia Shkodër	7

==== Hat-tricks ====
Player	For	Against	Result	Date
(Cuba) Joel Apezteguía^{4}	Teuta Durrës	KS Lushnja	6–2	2 February 2014
(Albania) Fatjon Sefa	Besa Kavajë	KS Lushnja	3–0	26 April 2014
(Albania) Sokol Cikalleshi	FK Kukësi	KS Lushnja	4–1	4 May 2014

^{4} Player scored 4 goals

=== Clean sheets ===
==== Player ====
Rank	Player	Club	Clean sheets
1	(Albania) Alban Hoxha	Partizani Tirana	14
2	(Albania) Orges Shehi	Skënderbeu Korçë	11
2	(Montenegro) Miroslav Vujadinović	Vllaznia Shkoder	11
3	(Albania) Edvan Bakaj	Besa Kavajë	10
4	(Albania) Ibrahim Bejte	Besa Kavajë	9
6	(Albania) Argjent Halili	FK Kukësi	8
6	(Albania) Shpëtim Moçka	Flamurtari Vlorë	8
6	(Albania) Ilion Lika	Kastrioti Krujë/KF Tirana	8
9	(Albania) Bledjan Rizvani	Teuta Durrës	7

== Attendances ==
Club	Lowest attendance	Highest attendance	Average attendance
Skënderbeu Korçë	1,500	7,000	3,953
KS Lushnja	200	7,000	3,594
Partizani Tirana	600	10,000	3,131
Flamurtari Vlorë	2,000	5,000	3,000
Vllaznia Shkodër	600	5,000	2,807
KF Tirana	700	7,800	2,793
Teuta Durrës	200	4,000	1,479
KF Laçi	700	2,500	1,478
FK Kukësi	2,000	5,400	3,367
Bylis Ballsh	250	3,500	1,935
Besa Kavajë	500	500	—
Kastrioti Krujë	500	500	—

== Awards ==
Monthly awards

Month	Player of the Month		
Month	Player	Club	Ref
September	(Albania) Daniel Xhafa	Teuta Durrës	
October	(Albania) Bledjan Rizvani	Teuta Durrës	
November	(Albania) Hair Zeqiri	Flamurtari Vlorë	
December	(Albania) Bledi Shkëmbi	Skënderbeu Korçë	
February	(Albania) Gentian Muça	KF Tirana	
March	(Albania) Sokol Cikalleshi	FK Kukësi	
April	(Albania) Ilion Lika	KF Tirana	
