= 2013–14 KF Tirana season =

Tirana
2013–14 season
- Chairman: Lulzim Basha
- Manager: Nevil Dede (until 24 October); Alpin Gallo (until 28 November); Sokol Bulku (until 1 December); Nevil Dede (from 1 December)
- Ground: Selman Stërmasi Stadium
- Kategoria Superiore: 6th
- Albanian Cup: Second round
- Top goalscorer: League: Gilberto Fortunato; Mario Morina (5); All: Gilberto Fortunato; Mario Morina (5)
- Lowest home attendance: 7,800 vs Partizani Tirana (7 February 2014)
Home colours	Away colours	Third colours

The 2013–14 season was Klubi i Futbollit Tirana's 75th competitive season, 75th consecutive season in the Kategoria Superiore and 93rd year in existence as a football club.

The team's performance in the first half of the league season was among the worst in the club's history, losing 10 of 16 games, at times ranking at the bottom of the league. The team's manager was changed four times, and they were eliminated from the Albanian Cup in the second round. However, the club made a dramatic comeback in the second half of the season, winning 11 of 17 games with a single loss, allowing them to finish in 6th place and avoid relegation.

== Season overview ==
=== June ===
The new season began with Klodian Duro, Erjon Dushku, Arjan Pisha, Francesco Pigoni, Herby Fortunat, Arbër Abilaliaj, Julian Ahmataj, Elton Muçollari, Eleandro Pema, Darjo Xhuti all leaving the team officially. On 1 June, both Ilion Lika and Mario Morina requested a transfer after refusing to extend their contracts. Tirana refused to terminate Morina's contract and he took his case to the league's Conflict Resolution Room. On 5 June, club administrator Krenar Alimehmeti confirmed that youngsters Marsel Çaka and Erion Hoxhallari had signed new three-year contracts. On 10 June, Morina left the team to join Skënderbeu Korçë. Midfielder Gilman Lika was loaned to Skënderbeu Korçë for the club's UEFA Champions League campaign. On 25 June, Morina officially became a player of Skënderbeu after winning a match against Tirana. On 12 June, Ilion Lika's contract ran out and he became a free agent. On the same day, youngsters Algi Lapardhaja, Glorian Hoxha, Alvi Gjoçaj, Klajdi Hyseni and Spartak Ajazi joined the team. Only Hoxha was offered a contract.

=== July ===
Tirana brought in Ilir Kastrati who accepted a contract after passing a trial. Defender Erjon Dushku joined Flamurtari Vlorë on a two-year contract after terminating his contract with Tirana in June. On 8 July, Tirana started their preparation phase on Pukë; they had only 18 players available. On 11 July, Fatmir Hysenbelliu's contract was extended; he joined the team for their preparation phase. On 13 July, midfielder Erando Karabeci was loaned to Kukësi for their Europa League qualifying campaign.

Tirana played its first friendly match on 15 July, winning 0–2 against Tërbuni Pukë with goals from Hoxha. Their second friendly occurred on 17 July when Tirana won 4–0 against rivals Dinamo. They played another friendly on 21 July versus Laçi; Mirel Çota scored their only goal in a 1–1 draw. Their next friendly occurred on 25 July; the team defeated Besa Kavajë thanks to a brace from Afrim Taku. Tirana brought Ervis Çaço on a one-year contract on 26 July. They lost their next friendly 0–4 to Teuta Durrës. At the end of the month, Gilman Lika's contract expired and he pursued a career outside of Europe.

=== August ===
Tirana started the month with a 1–2 friendly loss to Dinamo. On 12 August, the club acquired defender Dorian Kërçiku from Skënderbeu Korçë. In the next friendly, Tirana won 1–0 versus Vllaznia Shkodër with a Çota goal. Tirana lost their next friendly match to Flamurtari Vlorë on 22 August. Three days later, Tirana drew 1–1 versus Tërbuni Pukë; Çota scored Tirana's only goal.

On 28 August, Tirana played their last friendly match of summer against the under-19 side; they won 3–0. The following day was a busy one for the club; Kosovan footballer Mensur Limani returned to the club on a one-year contract extension, and Tirana completed the transfers of defender Ervis Kaja and forward Ilirjan Çaushaj, also on one-year contracts. On 30 August, Erando Karabeci returned to the club following his European campaign with Kukësi. Veteran Elvis Sina agreed to a contract extension with the club until June 2014. On the same day, Tirana reached an agreement with Roland Peqini and Vedran Gerc on one-year contracts. They were joined by Serbian forward Milan Jovanovic. On the deadline day, Tirana also signed Endrit Vrapi and Bledar Vashaku also on one-year deals. Forward Ergys Sorra was registered as a Tirana player for the 2013–14 season after spending the entire summer on trial.

=== September ===
Tirana began their league campaign on 1 September by playing at home versus Laçi; the match finished in a goalless draw. Six days later, Tirana brought the Cape Verdean forward José Semedo on trial, which he passed and was given a one-year contract. Tirana then played their second league match versus Lushnja, winning 1–0 with a Gentian Muça penalty in the first half to collect their first three points of the season. In the remaining three matches of September, Tirana lost three times with the same result, 2–0, against Vllaznia Shkodër, Skënderbeu Korçë and Teuta Durrës.

=== October ===
Tirana had a 1–0 home win over Kastrioti Krujë with Semedo scoring in the 9th minute. In the first capital derby after five years, Tirana slumped into a 0–1 loss to Partizani after a howler from young goalkeeper Çaka which brought their only goal. This loss dropped the team to 10th place in the relegation zone. Due to performances, the club decided to reduce their roster and effectively halve the cost of players' salaries. Defender Roland Peqini suffered a major knee injury which required surgery hours before the league match versus Partizani; his recovery would take more than five months. Tirana bounced back and won round 8 against Bylis Ballsh, with a winning goal by Semedo. Forward Vedran Gerc was replaced after 45 minutes following his poor performance; he had a debate with donor Ndriçim Babasi. After the debate ended, Gerc punched through the dressing room glass, slicing his veins. He underwent surgery and remained sidelined for two months.

Tirana began their Albanian Cup campaign by playing Albpetrol on 23 October. The team suffered an unexpected 0–1 away loss which resulted in the dismissal of manager Dede. Third choice goalkeeper Bledar Vashaku left the team after not getting paid at the club; he hadn't played a single minute. Manager Dede was replaced by Alpin Gallo. On 27 July, he signed a monthly contract. His first match in charge was a 0–1 away loss to Besa Kavajë.

=== November ===
Tirana played at Selman Stërmasi Stadium against Flamurtari Vlorë on 2 November. Goals from Hair Zeqiri in the second half resulted in Tirana's second consecutive loss in the league. Three days later, manager Alpin Gallo approached youngsters Hanc Llagami, Mateos Cake, Franc Doko, Orges Horanlli, Daniel Sula and Indrit Take in the senior team. On 6 November, in the returning leg of Albanian Cup first round, Tirana won 3–1 against Albpetrol to progress to the next round. Mirel Çota scored two goals, his first in eight months and Afrik Taku scored the other.

Back in league play, Tirana suffered a loss against Kukësi at Zeqir Ymeri Stadium. Despite netting an opener inside first five minutes with Mateos Cake, Kukësi bounced back and scored twice in the last 10 minutes of the first half to win 2–1. This third consecutive loss dropped the team to last position in the league. It was the first time that Tirana had collected only 10 points in 11 weeks. In the next league match on 25 November, Tirana lost again, this time at the hands of Laçi with a single goal by Sajmir Kastrati. Four days later, manager Alpin Gallo resigned, with Sokol Bulku named the interim manager. In the last league match of the month, Tirana lost 1–2 to Lushnja at Abdurrahman Roza Haxhiu Stadium; Entonio Pashaj scored the goal for Tirana. This loss distanced the team 7 points from the safe zone. Manager Sokol Bulku was sacked following the match.

=== December ===
The month began with Tirana appointing Gugash Magani as the new manager of the team until the end of the season. He became the team's fourth manager of the 2013–14 season. His first match was the first leg of Albanian Cup second round versus Lushnja; Tirana lost 0–1, their second loss in five days against the same opponent. Back in league, Tirana earned a hard-fought 1–1 draw against Vllaznia Shkodër; Arsen Hajdari opened the score for Vllaznia while Çota netted the equalizer in the second half. It was Tirana's first point after six matches.

In the next league match against Skënderbeu Korçë, Tirana lost 0–1 after a goal by Sabien Lilaj at the 59th minute. Tirana was eliminated from the Albanian Cup on 18 December after not going more than a 1–1 draw in the second leg, as the first match ended in a 0–1 loss. On 21 December, in the last league match of 2013, Tirana drew 1–1 against Teuta Durrës and finished the first part of the season at last place with 12 points, 9 points away from safe zone. On the same day, midfielder Fatmir Hysenbelliu announced his departure from the club with the aim of purchasing a career outside Albania. He was followed by José Semedo, Milan Jovanovic and Vedran Gerc, who were all released by the club.

Despite negative results, manager Gugash Magani was confirmed for the second part of season, with sponsor Refik Halili saying that he is not the problem. Tirana began negotiations to terminate the contract with defender Roland Peqini after making only two appearances.

=== January ===
On 5 January, Ilion Lika become the first player to join Tirana in the winter transfer, signing a contract for the remainder of the season. The next day, the club brought Brazilian forwards Leandro Matias Moris and Gilberto Fortunato on trial, along with Amick Ciani and Amadou Sidibe. Xhino Sejdo and Denis Kurti left after not being in club's plans while Ilir Kastrati was sent on loan to Himara until the end of the season. Tirana played their first friendly of 2014 on 8 January; they won 1–0 against Tërbuni Pukë thanks to a Gentian Muça penalty. After the match, Leandro Matias Moris, Amick Ciani and Amadou Sidibe were not offered a contract and they all left. Gilberto remained on trial.

Tirana played a second friendly match of the year on 11 January, resulting in a goalless draw against Dinamo. On 13 January, Ivan Delić signed a six-month contract. A day later, forward Gilberto Fortunato left the club due to his salary demands. Tirana played their next friendly against the under-19 Tirana side on 15 January; they won 10–0. Two days later, forward Gilberto returned and signed a six-month contract with an option to renew, becoming the club's third winter signing.

Tirana took a goalless draw against Vllaznia Shkodër in the fourth friendly of January. On 20 January, Tirana acquired the services of Erlind Koreshi as a free agent; he signed a contract until the end of the season with an option to renew. Tirana played their next friendly on 22 January against Elbasani and won 2–0 with goals by Morina and Çota. Midfielder Francis Kahata was offered a contract after impressing in this friendly; he came on loan until the end of 2013–14 season. The next day, Tirana released Ilirjan Çaushaj who wished to terminate his contract.

On 27 January, Tirana brought back goalkeeper Xhino Sejdo with a new contract. Tirana and defender Roland Peqini reached an agreement to terminate his contract. On 31 January, Mario Morina officially signed a contract until the end of the season after arriving at the club since 13 January. On the same day, Selemani Ndikumana joined the club with a one-and-a-half-year contract.

=== February ===
On 1 February, Tirana played Kastrioti Krujë in week 17; the match finished in a goalless draw despite the team having several good chances to score. Six days later, in the second capital derby against Partizani, Tirana won 1–0 thanks to an overhead kick of Gilberto, returning to the winning ways after nine consecutive matches. Tirana recorded another three points in the next round on 16 February, winning 0–1 at Bylis Ballsh thanks to the goal of Selemani Ndikumana. Tirana won their third consecutive league match on 23 February when they overturned Besa Kavajë 2–1 at home; Alked Çelhaka opened the score but Gilberto and Kërçiku overturned everything inside two minutes. This win lifted Tirana to 10th place, only one point away from the safety zone.

=== March ===
Tirana started March with a visit to Flamurtari Stadium to challenge Flamurtari Vlorë in the matchday 21. They opened the score first with Selemani Ndikumana before Flamurtari equalized through Ardit Shehaj. This draw was followed by the 3–1 home win over Kukësi; Afrim Taku scored an early opener with a penalty kick before Sokol Cikalleshi equalized the same way minutes later. In the second half Gilberto who scored a brace to seal the win, removing Tirana from the relegation zone. Tirana then traveled to Niko Dovana Stadium to face Teuta Durrës on 13 March; despite scoring first with Erando Karabeci, Tirana couldn't hold the lead and through the second half, finishing with a 1–1 draw. Tirana's first loss in 2014 league play was on 16 March; they slumped into a 1–2 home loss to Kukësi. Taku scored his team's only goal. It was the first loss in 11 matches. In the third and final capital derby against Partizani, Tirana opened the score with a Mario Morina goal in the 41st minute before conceding in the last moments of the match thanks to a Nderim Nexhipi header. In the last match of March, Tirana won 2–0 at home against Laçi; Kahata scored his first Tirana goal before Morina netted in the last minutes of the match.

=== April ===
Tirana's April began with a visit to the Skënderbeu Stadium to take on Skënderbeu Korçë on 5 April. The team scored twice in the first half with Morina and Kahata before Ndikumana netted a third in the 51st minute. Despite conceding twice from Pero Pejic, Tirana was able to win 3–2 and take another three points. On 8 April, veteran Elvis Sina confirmed his retirement at the end of the season. In the next three days, Tirana recorded another victory, winning 1–0 against Lushnja at Qemal Stafa Stadium with the header of Kahata, his third in the last three matches. This win lifted Tirana to 7th position. The next league match was a 3–0 walkover win over Bylis Ballsh as the club were excluded from the championship. Tirana played Vllaznia Shkodër in the matchday 30 on 26 February; the team recorded yet another win as they beat the visitors 2–1 with the goals of Endrit Vrapi and Morina. In the last match of April, Tirana won 2–3 at Kastrioti Krujë, recording their sixth consecutive success. Ardit Peposhi opened the score in the 38th minute, his first goal for Tirana. Then Gentian Muça scored with a penalty kick two minutes later. In the second half Kastrioti reopened the game with Erald Turdiu before Mensur Limani netted the third. The match ended 2–3 as Kastrioti scored in the last minutes with Nertil Ferraj. After this win, Tirana needed only one point to secure survival with two games on hand.

=== May ===
Tirana began May by earning a 2–2 away draw against Flamurtari Vlorë, which assured them the top flight spot for another season. Gilberto scored the first goal for Tirana while Morina added another one in the second half. After the match, manager Gugash Magani signed a contract extension for another season. Tirana was awarded a 3–0 walkover win against Besa Kavajë in Elvis Sina's final match as a professional. Verdhezinjtë refused to appear in the match. Tirana finished the championship in 6th place with 50 points, collecting 14 wins, 8 draws and 11 losses. They scored 36 goals and conceded 31.

== Players ==
=== Squad information ===
As of 21 April 2014

Squad No.	Name	Nationality	Position(s)	Date of Birth (Age)
Goalkeepers
1	Ilion Lika	(Albania)	GK	17 April 1980 (aged 33)
12	Marsel Çaka	(Albania)	GK	31 March 1995 (aged 18)
33	Xhino Sejdo	(Albania)	GK	30 April 1991 (aged 22)
Defenders
2	Elvis Sina (vice-captain)	(Albania)	RB	14 November 1978 (aged 34)
4	Gentian Muça (vice-captain)	(Albania)	CB / DM	13 May 1987 (aged 26)
5	Entonio Pashaj	(Albania)	CB	10 November 1985 (aged 27)
6	Blerim Kotobelli	(Albania)	RB / LB	10 August 1992 (aged 20)
19	Erion Hoxhallari	(Albania)	LB	26 February 1993 (aged 20)
29	Ervis Kaja	(Albania)	CB	29 July 1987 (aged 25)
44	Endri Vrapi	(Albania)	RB / LB / CB	23 March 1981 (aged 32)
99	Renaldo Kalari	(Albania)	LB	25 June 1984 (aged 29)
Midfielders
7	Francis Kahata	(Kenya)	CM	7 June 1991 (aged 22)
10	Mensur Limani	(Kosovo)	AM	5 December 1985 (aged 27)
13	Erando Karabeci (captain)	(Albania)	CM / DM / AM	6 September 1988 (aged 24)
18	Dorian Kërçiku	(Albania)	CM / RB / LB	30 July 1993 (aged 19)
20	Erlind Koreshi	(Albania)	CM	9 February 1987 (aged 26)
21	Ivan Delić	(Montenegro)	AM / RM	15 February 1986 (aged 27)
25	Ardit Peposhi	(Albania)	LM	14 September 1993 (aged 19)
26	Afrim Taku	(Albania)	CM / RB / RW	4 August 1989 (aged 23)
Forwards
9	Mirel Çota	(Albania)	CF	14 May 1988 (aged 25)
11	Ergys Sorra	(Albania)	CF	23 July 1989 (aged 23)
17	Selemani Ndikumana	(Burundi)	CF / LW / RW	18 March 1987 (aged 26)
22	Mateos Cake	(Albania)	CF	12 December 1995 (aged 17)
23	Gilberto Fortunato	(Brazil)	CF	7 November 1987 (aged 25)
27	Mario Morina	(Albania)	CF	16 October 1992 (aged 20)

==== From youth squad ====
Note: Flags indicate national team as defined under FIFA eligibility rules; some limited exceptions apply. Players may hold more than one non-FIFA nationality.

No.	Pos.	Nation	Player
22	MF	ALB	Mateos Cake
—	MF	ALB	Hanc Llagami
—		ALB	Daniel Sula

No.	Pos.	Nation	Player
—		ALB	Franc Doko
—		ALB	Orges Horanlli
—		ALB	Indrit Take

== Transfers ==
=== In ===
==== Summer ====
Date	Pos.	Nationality	Player	Age	Moving from	Fee	Notes	Ref
1 July 2013	FW	(Albania)	Glorian Hoxha	19	Shkëndija Tiranë	Free		
1 July 2013	FW	(Albania)	Ilir Kastrati	19	Panathinaikos U20	Free		
12 August 2013	MF	(Albania)	Dorian Kërçiku	20	Skënderbeu Korçë	Free		
29 August 2013	DF	(Albania)	Ervis Kaja	26	Besa Kavajë	Free		
29 August 2013	FW	(Albania)	Ilirjan Çaushaj	26	Skënderbeu Korçë	Free		
30 August 2013	MF	(Albania)	Erando Karabeci	24	Kukësi	Free	Loan return	
30 August 2013	DF	(Albania)	Roland Peqini	22	Kukësi	Free		
30 August 2013	FW	(Croatia)	Vedran Gerc	26	Žalgiris	Free		
30 August 2013	FW	(Serbia)	Milan Jovanović	29	Radnički Niš	Free		
31 August 2013	DF	(Albania)	Endrit Vrapi	31	Skënderbeu Korçë	Free		
31 August 2013	GK	(Albania)	Bledar Vashaku	31	Besa Kavajë	Free		
31 August 2013	FW	(Albania)	Ergys Sorra	24	Dinamo Tirana	Free		
11 September 2013	FW	(Cape Verde)	José Semedo	33	Nea Salamis	Free		

==== Winter ====
Date	Pos.	Nationality	Player	Age	Moving from	Fee	Notes	Ref
5 January 2014	GK	(Albania)	Ilion Lika	33	Kastrioti Krujë	Free		
13 January 2014	MF	(Montenegro)	Ivan Delić	33	OFK Grbalj	Free		
17 January 2014	FW	(Brazil)	Gilberto Fortunato	26	Unattached	Free		
20 January 2014	MF	(Albania)	Erlind Koreshi	26	Lushnja	Free		
22 January 2014	MF	(Kenya)	Francis Kahata	26	Thika United	N/A	On loan	
31 January 2014	FW	(Albania)	Mario Morina	21	Skënderbeu Korçë	Free		
31 January 2014	FW	(Burundi)	Selemani Ndikumana	26	Unattached	Free		

=== Out ===
==== Summer ====
Date	Pos.	Nationality	Player	Age	Moving to	Fee	Notes	Ref
1 June 2013	MF	(Albania)	Klodian Duro	35	Unattached (Note: After Klodian Duro left the club he decided to retire.)	N/A		
1 June 2013	DF	(Albania)	Erjon Dushku	28	Flamurtari Vlorë (Note: Erjon Dushku joined Flamurtari Vlorë after his departure.)	Free		
1 June 2013	DF	(Albania)	Arjan Pisha	36	Elbasani (Note: Arjan Pisha joined Elbasani after his departure.)	Free		
1 June 2013	DF	(Italy)	Francesco Pigoni	27	Unattached	Free		
1 June 2013	FW	(Republic of the Congo)	Herby Fortunat	30	Unattached	Free		
1 June 2013	FW	(Albania)	Arbër Abilaliaj	26	Flamurtari Vlorë (Note: Arbër Abilaliaj joined Flamurtari Vlorë after his departure.)	Free		
1 June 2013	MF	(Albania)	Julian Ahmataj	34	Teuta Durrës (Note: Julian Ahmataj joined Teuta Durrës after his departure.)	Free		
1 June 2013	MF	(Albania)	Elton Muçollari	32	Kastrioti Krujë (Note: Elton Muçollari joined Kastrioti Krujë after his departure.)	Free		
1 June 2013	MF	(Albania)	Eleandro Pema	28	Kastrioti Krujë (Note: Eleandro Pema joined Kastrioti Krujë after his departure.)	Free		
1 June 2013	MF	(Albania)	Darjo Xhuti	22	Unattached	Free		
10 June 2013	FW	(Albania)	Mario Morina	28	Skënderbeu Korçë	Undisclosed		
27 June 2013	GK	(Albania)	Ilion Lika	33	Kastrioti Krujë (Note: Ilion Lika joined Kastrioti Krujë after his departure.)	Free		
13 July 2013	MF	(Albania)	Erando Karabeci	24	Kukësi	Free	Only for the UEFA Europa League campaign	
30 July 2013	MF	(Albania)	Gilman Lika	26	Al-Faisaly (Note: Gilman Lika joined Al-Faisaly after his departure.)	Free		

==== Winter ====
Date	Pos.	Nationality	Player	Age	Moving to	Fee	Notes	Ref
21 December 2013	MF	(Albania)	Fatmir Hysenbelliu	21	Partizani Tirana (Note: Fatmir Hysenbelliu joined Partizani Tirana after his departure.)	Free		
22 December 2013	FW	(Cape Verde)	José Semedo	33	Omonia Aradippou (Note: José Semedo joined Omonia Aradippou after his departure.)	Free		
22 December 2013	FW	(Serbia)	Milan Jovanović	30	Sloga Kraljevo (Note: Milan Jovanovic joined Sloga Kraljevo after his departure.)	Free		
22 December 2013	FW	(Croatia)	Vedran Gerc	27	NK Pomorac 1921 (Note: Vedran Gerc joined NK Pomorac 1921 after his departure.)	Free		
6 January 2014	FW	(Albania)	Ilir Kastrati	19	Himara	Free	On loan	
6 January 2014	MF	(Albania)	Denis Kurti	22	Bylis Ballsh (Note: Denis Kurti joined Bylis Ballsh after his departure.)	Free		
23 January 2014	FW	(Albania)	Ilirjan Çaushaj	22	PAE Kerkyra (Note: Ilirjan Çaushaj joined PAE Kerkyra after his departure.)	Free		
27 January 2014	DF	(Albania)	Roland Peqini	23	Kukësi	Free		

== Pre-season and friendlies ==
15 July 2013 Friendly	Tërbuni Pukë (Albania)	0–2	(Albania) Tirana	Pukë, Albania
14:00 CET		Report	Hoxha 40', 65'	Stadium: Ismail Xhemali Stadium; Referee: Agron Kastrati

17 July 2013 Friendly	Tirana (Albania)	4–0	(Albania) Dinamo Tirana	Tirana, Albania
09:00 CET	Kalari 28'; Muça 57'; Çota 70', 83'	Report		Stadium: Selman Stërmasi Stadium; Referee: Bardhyl Pashaj

21 July 2013 Friendly	Tirana (Albania)	1–1	(Albania) Laçi	Tirana, Albania
18:00 CET	Çota 13'	Report	Ndreka 23'	Stadium: Selman Stërmasi Stadium; Attendance: 200

25 July 2013 Friendly	Tirana (Albania)	2–1	(Albania) Besa Kavajë	Tirana, Albania
18:00 CET	Taku 70' (pen.), 80'	Report	Cikalleshi 35'	Stadium: Selman Stërmasi Stadium
Note: The match ended in 85th minute after a massive brawl between players.

27 July 2013 Friendly	Teuta Durrës (Albania)	4–0	(Albania) Tirana	Durrës, Albania
14:00 CET	Mançaku 5'; R. Hoxha 65'; Muriqi 66'; A. Hoxha 72' (pen.)	Report		Stadium: Niko Dovana Stadium

7 August 2013 Friendly	Tirana (Albania)	1–2	(Albania) Dinamo Tirana	Tirana, Albania
18:00 CET	Kastrati 50' (pen.)	Report	Djarmati 21'; Capo 40'	Stadium: Selman Stërmasi Stadium; Referee: Ardian Beqiri

14 August 2013 Friendly	Tirana (Albania)	1–0	(Albania) Vllaznia Shkodër	Tirana, Albania
18:00 CET	Çota 26'; Sorra (yellow card) 61'; Kalari (yellow card) 74'; Kaja (yellow card) 80'; Xhafa (yellow card) 85'	Report		Stadium: Selman Stërmasi Stadium; Referee: Endrit Zhuli

21 August 2013 Friendly	Tirana (Albania)	0–1	(Albania) Flamurtari Vlorë	Tirana, Albania
14:00 CET		Report	Kuqi (yellow card) 1'; Lena (yellow card) 23'; Telushi (yellow card) 24' (yellow-red card) 45'; Shehaj (yellow card) 40'; Pepa 44'	Stadium: Skënder Halili Complex; Attendance: 500; Referee: Edvaldo Dyrmishi

24 August 2013 Friendly	Tirana (Albania)	1–1	(Albania) Tërbuni Pukë	Tirana, Albania
14:00 CET	Çota 12'; Taku (yellow card) 70'	Report	Agastra 1'; Baze (penalty missed)	Stadium: Skënder Halili Complex; Referee: Edvaldo Dyrmishi

28 August 2013 Friendly	Tirana (Albania)	3–0	(Albania) Tirana U19	Tirana, Albania
14:00 CET	Kërçiku 20'; Gerc 26'; Peposhi 55'	Report		Stadium: Skënder Halili Complex

8 January 2014 Friendly	Tirana (Albania)	1–0	(Albania) Tërbuni Pukë	Tirana, Albania
13:10 CET	Muça 75' (pen.)	Report	Agastra (yellow card)	Stadium: Skënder Halili Complex

11 January 2014 Friendly	Tirana (Albania)	0–0	(Albania) Dinamo Tirana	Tirana, Albania
14:10 CET		Report		Stadium: Skënder Halili Complex; Attendance: 200; Referee: Edvaldo Dyrmishi

15 January 2014 Friendly	Tirana (Albania)	10–0	(Albania) Tirana U19	Tirana, Albania
14:00 CET	Sallaku 11' (o.g.); Morina 27', 30'; Çota 38'; Sorra 43'; Delić 55'; Peposhi 57', 60'; Hoxha 65'; Taku 75' (pen.)	Report		Stadium: Skënder Halili Complex

18 January 2014 Friendly	Vllaznia Shkodër (Albania)	0–0	(Albania) Tirana	Shkodër, Albania
14:00 CET		Report		Stadium: Loro Boriçi Stadium; Referee: Ditmar Jubica

22 January 2014 Friendly	Elbasani (Albania)	0–2	(Albania) Tirana	Elbasan, Albania
14:00 CET		Report	Çota 24'; Morina 77'	Stadium: Ruzhdi Bizhuta Stadium; Attendance: 300; Referee: Dashamir Muça

== Competitions ==
=== Kategoria Superiore ===
==== League table ====
Pos	Team	Pld	W	D	L	GF	GA	GD	Pts	Qualification or relegation
4	Teuta	33	14	12	7	46	35	+11	54	
5	Partizani	33	15	8	10	33	26	+7	53	
6	Tirana	33	14	8	11	36	31	+5	50	
7	Flamurtari (Note: Flamurtari were deducted three points.)	33	14	9	10	45	40	+5	48	Qualification for the Europa League first qualifying round
8	Vllaznia	33	12	9	12	42	36	+6	45	

Source: Albanian Football Association (in Albanian), Soccerway
Rules for classification: 1) points; 2) points in head-to-head matches; 3) goal difference in head-to-head matches; 4) goals scored in head-to-head matches; 5) total goal difference; 6) total goals scored; 7) draw

==== Results summary ====
Overall								Home						Away					
Pld	W	D	L	GF	GA	GD	Pts	W	D	L	GF	GA	GD	W	D	L	GF	GA	GD
33	14	8	11	36	31	+5	50	10	3	3	19	10	+9	4	5	8	17	21	−4

Last updated: 10 May 2014.
Source: Competitive matches

==== Results by round ====
Round	1	2	3	4	5	6	7	8	9	10	11	12	13	14	15	16	17	18	19	20	21	22	23	24	25	26	27	28	29	30	31	32	33
Ground	H	H	A	H	A	H	A	H	A	H	A	A	A	H	A	H	A	H	A	H	A	H	A	H	A	H	A	H	A	H	A	A	H
Result	D	W	L	L	L	W	L	W	L	L	L	L	L	D	L	D	D	W	W	W	D	W	D	L	D	W	W	W	W	W	W	D	W
Position	5	2	7	10	11	9	10	7	8	11	12	12	12	12	12	12	12	12	11	10	10	8	8	8	9	9	9	8	8	7	6	6	6

Source: Competitive matches
A = Away; H = Home; W = Win; D = Draw; L = Loss

==== Matches ====
1 September 2013 1	Tirana	0–0	Laçi	Tirana
16:00 CET	Kaja (yellow card) 23'; Kalari (yellow card) 53'; Karabeci (yellow card) 90+2'	Report	Teqja (yellow card) 50'	Stadium: Qemal Stafa Stadium; Attendance: 1,000; Referee: Laver Alla

15 September 2013 2	Tirana	1–0	Lushnja	Tirana
13:00 CET	Muça 28' (pen.); Karabeci (yellow card) 44'; Mumajezi (yellow card) 74'; Peposhi (yellow card) 80'	Report	Sula (yellow card) 22'; Mihani (yellow card) 45'; Gjyla (yellow card) 64'	Stadium: Qemal Stafa Stadium; Attendance: 2,000; Referee: Emirjon Sino

18 September 2013 3	Vllaznia Shkodër	2–0	Tirana	Shkodër
13:00 CET	Rajović (yellow card) 15'; Shtubina 25'; Bušić 29'	Report	Gerc (red card) 15'	Stadium: Loro Boriçi Stadium; Attendance: 4,000; Referee: Kreshnik Cjapi

22 September 2013 4	Tirana	0–2	Skënderbeu Korçë	Tirana
16:00 CET		Report	Radaŝ 59' (yellow card) 59'; Ribaj 80'	Stadium: Qemal Stafa Stadium; Attendance: 3,000; Referee: Ditmar Jubica

29 September 2013 5	Teuta Durrës	2–0	Tirana	Durrës
13:00 CET	Xhafaj 59'; Mancaku 69' (pen.); Jakupi (yellow card) 83'	Report	Kërçiku (yellow card) 6'; Peposhi (yellow card) 89'	Stadium: Niko Dovana Stadium; Attendance: 500; Referee: Edvin Hoxha

2 October 2013 6	Tirana	1–0	Kastrioti Krujë	Tirana
13:00 CET	Kurti (yellow card) 3'; Semedo 9'; Kalari (yellow card) 34'; Çaka (yellow card) 73'; Kërçiku (yellow card) 80'; Peposhi (yellow card) 81'	Report	Caca (yellow card) 3'; Xhafa (yellow card) 18' (yellow-red card) 88'; Daja (yellow card) 56'	Stadium: Selman Stërmasi Stadium; Attendance: 1,200; Referee: Emirjon Sino

12 October 2013 7	Partizani Tirana	1–0	Tirana	Tirana
19:00 CET	Hyshmeri (yellow card) 4'; Demiri (yellow card) 47' (goal) 57'; Hoxha (yellow card) 89'	Report	Kërçiku (yellow card) 16'; Karabeci (yellow card) 37'; Pashaj (yellow card) 65'; Çaka (yellow card) 67'; Çota (yellow card) 73'; Vrapi (yellow card) 90+2'	Stadium: Qemal Stafa Stadium; Attendance: 8,000; Referee: Lorenc Jemini

20 October 2013 8	Tirana	1–0	Bylis Ballsh	Tirana
13:00 CET	Pashaj (yellow card) 45'; Semedo 75'; Vrapi (yellow card) 78'; Hoxhallari (yellow card) 86'; Limani (yellow card) 90+3'	Report	Gërxho (yellow card) 55'	Stadium: Selman Stërmasi Stadium; Attendance: 500; Referee: Enea Jorgji

27 October 2013 9	Besa Kavajë	1–0	Tirana	Kavajë
14:00 CET	Ramadanaj (yellow card) 29'; Berisha 30'; Rroshi (yellow card) 77'; Sefa (yellow card) 90'	Report	Hoxhallari (yellow card) 32'; Pashaj (yellow card) 52'; Taku (yellow card) 60' (yellow-red card) 89'	Stadium: Besa Stadium; Attendance: 500; Referee: Remzi Sadiku

2 November 2013 10	Tirana	0–2	Flamurtari Vlorë	Tirana
14:00 CET	Hoxhallari (yellow card) 47'; Karabeci (yellow card) 53'; Peposhi (yellow card) 53'	Report	Zeqiri 54', 83'; Lena (red card) 56'; Arbëri (yellow card) 65'; Sakaj (yellow card) 76'	Stadium: Selman Stërmasi Stadium; Attendance: 1,000; Referee: Enea Jorgji

10 November 2013 11	Kukësi	2–1	Tirana	Kukës
13:00 CET	Cikalleshi 35'; Popović (yellow card) 39'; Allmuça 45'	Report	Cake 4'; Kotobelli (yellow card) 8' (yellow-red card) 13'; Limani (yellow card) 38'; Taku (yellow card) 65'; Çaka (yellow card) 87'	Stadium: Zeqir Ymeri Stadium; Attendance: 1,500; Referee: Ditmar Jubica

24 November 2013 12	Laçi	1–0	Tirana	Laç
16:00 CET	Kastrati 14'; Vucaj (yellow card) 42'; Shazivari (yellow card) 90+5'	Report	Pashaj (yellow card) 90+3'	Stadium: Laçi Stadium; Attendance: 0 Referee: Kridens Meta

30 November 2013 13	Lushnja	2–1	Tirana	Lushnje
13:30 CET	Canka 23'; Mihani 40'; Bakiasi (yellow card) 29' (yellow-red card) 61'	Report	Kërçiku (yellow card) 29'; Pashaj 43'; Çota (yellow card) 90+1'	Stadium: Abdurrahman Roza Haxhiu Stadium; Attendance: 5,000; Referee: Enea Jorgji

7 December 2013 14	Tirana	1–1	Vllaznia Shkodër	Tirana
13:00 CET	Kërçiku (yellow card) 45'; Çota 57'; Karabeci (yellow card) 87'	Report	Bardulla (yellow card) 23'; Hajdari 37'; Boçi (yellow card) 37'; Belisha (yellow card) 45' (yellow-red card) 65'; Vujadinović (yellow card) 82'	Stadium: Qemal Stafa Stadium; Attendance: 1,000; Referee: Remzi Sadiku

14 December 2013 15	Skënderbeu Korçë	1–0	Tirana	Korçë
14:00 CET	Lilaj 59'; Arapi (yellow card) 74'	Report	Taku (yellow card) 46'; Pashaj 65'	Stadium: Skënderbeu Stadium; Attendance: 5,000; Referee: Laver Alla

21 December 2013 16	Tirana	0–0	Teuta Durrës	Tirana
13:30 CET	Kalari (yellow card) 89'	Report	Deliallisi (yellow card) 62'; Ahmataj (yellow card) 79'; Dosti (yellow card) 86'	Stadium: Qemal Stafa Stadium; Attendance: 700; Referee: Laver Alla

1 February 2014 17	Kastrioti Krujë	0–0	Tirana	Krujë
14:00 CET	Bratić (yellow card) 13'; Daja (yellow card) 56'; Caca (yellow card) 65'	Report	Taku (yellow card) 21'; Vrapi (yellow card) 43'	Stadium: Kastroti Stadium; Attendance: 2,200; Referee: Kridens Meta

7 February 2014 18	Tirana	1–0	Partizani Tirana	Tirana
18:00 CET	Kërçiku (yellow card) 54'; Karabeci (yellow card) 65'; Lika (yellow card) 70'; Gilberto 77'; Kalari (yellow card) 77'; Pashaj (yellow card) 80'	Report	Hoxha (yellow card) 51'; Krasniqi (yellow card) 70'; Musta (yellow card) 75'	Stadium: Qemal Stafa Stadium; Attendance: 7,800; Referee: Emirjon Sino

16 February 2014 19	Bylis Ballsh	0–1	Tirana	Ballsh
13:00 CET	Meto (yellow card) 19'; Frashëri (yellow card) 55'	Report	Morina (yellow card) 55'; Ndikumana 71'; Kahata (yellow card) 85'	Stadium: Adush Muça Stadium; Attendance: 3,000; Referee: Edvin Hoxha

23 February 2014 20	Tirana	2–1	Besa Kavajë	Tirana
18:00 CET	Gilberto 17'; Kërçiku 19' (yellow card) 67'	Report	Çelhaka 13'; Sefa (yellow card) 45+1'	Stadium: Qemal Stafa Stadium; Attendance: 1,500; Referee: Laver Alla

2 March 2014 21	Flamurtari Vlorë	1–1	Tirana	Vlorë
17:00 CET	Dushku (yellow card) 56'; Telushi (yellow card) 62'; Shehaj 68' (yellow card) 68'	Report	Ndikumana 23' (yellow card) 56'; Muça (yellow card) 47'; Gilberto (yellow card) 50'; Kalari (yellow card) 54'	Stadium: Flamurtari Stadium; Attendance: 4,000; Referee: Emirjon Sino

8 March 2014 22	Tirana	3–1	Kukësi	Tirana
14:00 CET	Taku 4' (pen.) (yellow card) 85'; Vrapi (yellow card) 16'; Gilberto 50', 71'; Kërçiku (yellow card) 68'; Karabeci (yellow card) 82'	Report	Uche (yellow card) 10'; Cikalleshi 17' (pen.) (yellow card) 61'; Shameti (yellow card) 47'; Progni (yellow card) 79'; Malota (yellow card) 90+2'	Stadium: Qemal Stafa Stadium; Attendance: 5,000; Referee: Enea Jorgji

13 March 2014 23	Teuta Durrës	1–1	Tirana	Durrës
18:00 CET	Hoxha 44' (yellow card) 54'; Hodo (yellow card) 65'	Report	Karabeci 36'; Sina (yellow card) 83'; Ndikumana (yellow card) 89'	Stadium: Niko Dovana Stadium; Attendance: 3,000; Referee: Lorenc Jemini

16 March 2014 24	Tirana	1–2	Kukësi	Tirana
17:00 CET	Ndikumana (yellow card) 37'; Taku 55'; Koreshi (yellow card) 68'	Report	Cikalleshi 50', 78'	Stadium: Qemal Stafa Stadium; Attendance: 4,000; Referee: Lorenc Jemini

23 March 2014 25	Partizani Tirana	1–1	Tirana	Tirana
20:00 CET	Rrahmani (yellow card) 6'; Hoxha (yellow card) 6'; Maliqi (yellow card) 37'; Ibrahimi (yellow card) 59'; Nexhipi 90+3'	Report	Morina 41'; Kërçiku (yellow card) 45+2'; Karabeci (yellow card) 51'; Pashaj (yellow card) 58'; Koreshi (yellow card) 65' (yellow-red card) 83'; Limani (yellow card) 90+2'	Stadium: Qemal Stafa Stadium; Attendance: 10,000; Referee: Enea Jorgji

29 March 2014 26	Tirana	2–0	Laçi	Tirana
15:00 CET	Kahata 14'; Karabeci (yellow card) 46'; Morina 88'	Report	Teqja (yellow card) 22'; Owoeye (yellow card) 59'; Danaj (yellow card) 67'	Stadium: Qemal Stafa Stadium; Attendance: 2,000; Referee: Kridens Meta

5 April 2014 27	Skënderbeu Korçë	2–3	Tirana	Korçë
16:00 CET	Arapi (yellow card) 27'; Pejić 55', 66'; Radaš (yellow card) 73'; Dimo (yellow card) 79'	Report	Kahata 34'; Pashaj (yellow card) 37'; Morina 40'; Ndikumana 51'	Stadium: Skënderbeu Stadium; Attendance: 7,000; Referee: Laver Alla

12 April 2014 28	Tirana	1–0	Lushnja	Tirana
16:00 CET	Kahata 31'; Delić (yellow card) 82'; Sorra (red card) 90'; Karabeci (yellow card) 90+1'	Report	Trashi (yellow card) 26'; Gjyla (yellow card) 45'; Sula (yellow card) 83' (yellow-red card) 90'; Petro (yellow card) 84'	Stadium: Qemal Stafa Stadium; Attendance: 0 Referee: Andi Koçi

19 April 2014 29	Tirana	3–0	Bylis Ballsh	Ballsh
13:00 CET		Report		Stadium: Adush Muça Stadium; Attendance: 0
Note: >Match awarded 0-3 by FA decision due to the expelled of Bylis Ballsh from Kategoria Superiore.

26 April 2014 30	Tirana	2–1	Vllaznia Shkodër	Tirana
15:00 CET	Vrapi 19'; Morina 33'; Pashaj (yellow card) 75'; Kalari (yellow card) 77'	Report	Bušić 35' (pen.); Vukčević (yellow card) 52'; Bardulla (yellow card) 75'	Stadium: Qemal Stafa Stadium; Attendance: 4,000; Referee: Lorenc Jemini

30 April 2014 31	Kastrioti Krujë	2–3	Tirana	Krujë
15:00 CET	Turdiu 66' (pen.) (yellow card) 87'; Ferraj (yellow card) 67' (goal) 85'	Report	Peposhi 38'; Muça 40'; Limani 82'	Stadium: Kastroti Stadium; Attendance: 500; Referee: Laver Alla

4 May 2014 32	Flamurtari Vlorë	2–2	Tirana	Vlorë
16:00 CET	Abilaliaj 27', 57' (yellow card) 90'; Telushi (yellow card) 50'; Dushku (yellow card) 54'; Lena (yellow card) 73'; Kuqi (yellow card) 90+2'	Report	Gilberto 5'; Muça (yellow card) 45'; Kalari (yellow card) 52'; Morina 73'; Koreshi (yellow card) 75'	Stadium: Flamurtari Stadium; Attendance: 3,000; Referee: Lorenc Jemini

10 May 2014 33	Tirana	3–0	Besa Kavajë	Tirana
16:30 CET		Report		Stadium: Qemal Stafa Stadium
Note: Match awarded 0-3 by FA decision because Besa Kavajë did not appear in the match.

=== Albanian Cup ===
==== First round ====
23 October 2013 First leg	Albpetrol Patos	1–0	Tirana	Patos
13:00 CET	Zharkalliu 16'; Korreshi (yellow card) 40'; Hidersha (yellow card) 80'	Report	Kastrati (yellow card) 18'; Taku (yellow card) 40'	Stadium: Alush Noga Stadium; Attendance: 600; Referee: Elidon Halo

6 November 2013 Second leg	Tirana	3–1 (3–2 agg.)	Albpetrol Patos	Tirana
13:30 CET	Çota 5', 67'; Çaushaj (yellow card) 24'; Pashaj (yellow card) 54'; Taku 66'; Kërçiku (yellow card) 84'	Report	Kopa 85'	Stadium: Skënder Halili Complex; Attendance: 200; Referee: Edvaldo Durmishi

==== Second round ====
4 December 2013 First leg	Lushnja	1–0	Tirana	Lushnje
13:30 CET	Topi 17'; Bizhyti (yellow card) 47'; Gjyla (yellow card) 51'; Dervishi (yellow card) 78'	Report	Vrapi (yellow card) 42'	Stadium: Abdurrahman Roza Haxhiu Stadium; Attendance: 2,500; Referee: Blerim Ziri

18 December 2013 Second leg	Tirana	1–1 (a.e.t.) (1–2 agg.)	Lushnja	Tirana
13:00 CET	Kërçiku (yellow card) 18' (yellow-red card) 105'; Karabeci 30'; Vrapi (yellow card) 36'; José Semedo (yellow card) 75'; Sina (yellow card) 98'	Report	Trashi (yellow card) 34'; Bjelkanović (yellow card) 40'; Gjyla (yellow card) 100'; Canka 110' (yellow card) 110'	Stadium: Qemal Stafa Stadium; Attendance: 600; Referee: Remzi Sadiku

== Statistics ==
=== Squad stats ===
	League	Cup	Total Stats
Games played	33	4	37
Games won	14	1	15
Games drawn	8	2	10
Games lost	11	2	13
Goals scored	36	4	40
Goals conceded	31	4	35
Goal difference	5	0	5
Clean sheets	12	0	12

Last updated: 10 May 2014
Source: Soccerway

=== Top scorers ===
No.	Pos.	Nation	Name	Kategoria Superiore	Albanian Cup	Total
23	FW	(Brazil)	Gilberto Fortunato	5	0	5
27	FW	(Albania)	Mario Morina	5	0	5
7	MF	(Kenya)	Francis Kahata	3	0	3
9	FW	(Albania)	Mirel Çota	1	2	3
17	FW	(Burundi)	Selemani Ndikumana	3	0	3
26	MF	(Albania)	Afrim Taku	2	1	3
4	DF	(Albania)	Gentian Muça	2	0	2
13	MF	(Albania)	Erando Karabeci	1	1	2
14	FW	(Cape Verde)	José Semedo	2	0	2
5	DF	(Albania)	Entonio Pashaj	1	0	1
10	MF	(Kosovo)	Mensur Limani	1	0	1
18	MF	(Albania)	Dorian Kërçiku	1	0	1
22	FW	(Albania)	Mateos Cake	1	0	1
25	MF	(Albania)	Ardit Peposhi	1	0	1
44	DF	(Albania)	Endrit Vrapi	1	0	1
TOTAL				36 (Note: Tirana won two matches by a 3–0 walkover against Bylis Ballsh and Besa Kavajë as the first team was banned from the championship and the second refused to appear in the match.)	4	40

Last updated: 10 May 2014

=== Clean sheets ===
The list is sorted by shirt number when total appearances are equal.

Rnk	No.	Player	Kategoria Superiore	Albanian Cup	Total
1	12	(Albania) Marsel Çaka	6	0	6
2	1	(Albania) Ilion Lika	4	0	4
3	33	(Albania) Xhino Sejdo	0	0	0
TOTALS			10	0	10 (Note: Tirana won two matches by a 3–0 walkover against Bylis Ballsh and Besa Kavajë as the first team was banned from the championship and the second refused to appear in the match.)

Last updated: 10 May 2014
