= Gentian Muça =

Albanian footballer

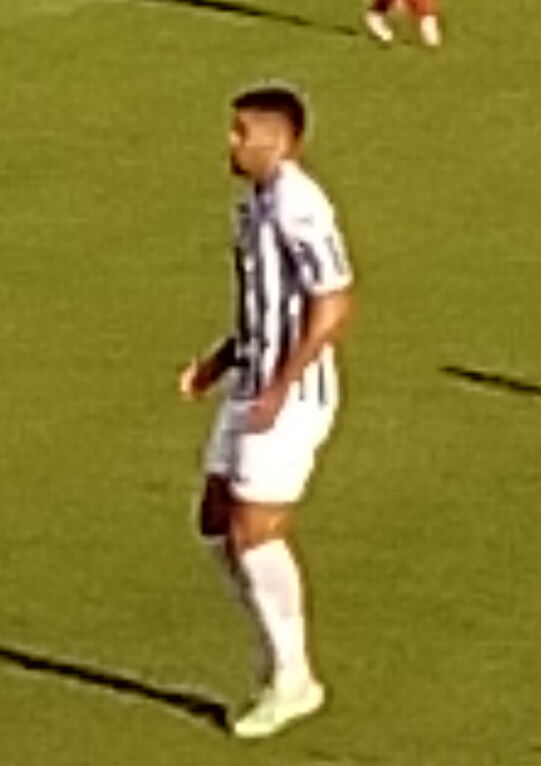

Personal information
- Date of birth: 13 May 1987 (age 39)
- Place of birth: Tirana, Albania
- Height: 1.86 m (6 ft 1 in)
- Position: Centre-back

Team information
- Current team: Tirana U21 (manager)

Youth career
- 2000–2006: Tirana

Senior career*
Years	Team	Apps	(Gls)
2006	Bonner SC	0	(0)
2007	SC Vahr-Blockdiek	0	(0)
2008	VSK Osterholz-Scharmbeck	9	(0)
2008–2011	Tirana	14	(0)
2008–2009	→ Bylis Ballsh (loan)	28	(2)
2009–2010	→ Dinamo Tirana (loan)	19	(3)
2011	Vllaznia Shkodër	13	(0)
2012	Flamurtari Vlorë	10	(1)
2012–2020	Tirana	143	(15)
2015	→ Kukësi (loan)	0	(0)
2016	→ Kukësi (loan)	0	(0)
2018–2020	Tirana B	14	(2)
2020–2021	Prishtina	10	(2)
2021–2022	Tirana	6	(0)
Total		266	(25)

International career
2005	Albania U19	3	(1)
2010	Albania	1	(0)

Managerial career
- 2022–: Tirana U21
- 2025–: Tirana B
- * Club domestic league appearances and goals

Gentian Muça (born 13 May 1987) is an Albanian professional football coach and former who manages the Under-21 squad of Tirana. A centre-back and product of the KF Tirana academy, he spent much of his early career in the lower leagues of Germany before returning to Albania, and indeed Tirana in 2008.

Following his return to Tirana, Muça spent one season on loan at Bylis Ballsh and another one at Dinamo Tirana, where he won the league for the first time in his career. After his successful spell at Dinamo Tirana, Muça returned to Tirana where he played during the 2010–11 season.

Then, his contract was not extended so he decided to join Vllaznia Shkodër where he played only in the first part of 2011–12 season before spending the other part at Flamurtari Vlorë. Following this, Tirana brought him back and ever since he became a regular member in the starting lineup, making more than 100 appearances in all competitions. During the summer of 2015 and 2016, he was loaned to Kukësi for the club's European campaign.

Muça represented Albania at youth level, playing for the under-19 in 2005. In 2009, he was called up for the first in the senior team where he made his unofficial debut against Kosovo.

== Club career ==
=== Early career ===
Muça started his early career by playing in the Germany lower leagues with teams like Bonner SC, SC Vahr-Blockdiek and VSK Osterholz-Scharmbeck.

=== Tirana ===
After his spell in the lower leagues of Germany, Muça returned to Tirana in the summer of 2008, but the coach at that time Blaz Sliskovic suggested him to go on loan to another club to gain experience, as playing for Tirana for a youngster like him would have been quite difficult. Muça spent the 2008–09 season on loan at fellow top flight side Bylis Ballsh, collecting 28 league appearances, scoring twice, as the team finished 9th in league, which sent them to relegation play-offs where they faced Gramozi Ersekë, suffering a 2–5 loss after extra time which eventually relegated them.

==== 2009–2010: Loan to Dinamo ====
Muça completed a transfer to Dinamo Tirana on a long-season loan. He made his UEFA Europa League debut on 9 July 2009 in the returning leg of the first qualifying round against Finnish club Lahti, playing full-90 minutes in a 2–0 home win at Qemal Stafa Stadium. However, despite winning 2–0 at home, Dinamo was eliminated from the competition after losing the first match 4–1.

Muça's league debut occurred on 23 August in the opening match against Kastrioti Krujë, helping his side with a goal in an eventual 3–1 win. He netted a header in the 68th minute via a corner kick. On 21 February of the following year, during the 3–0 away defeat to Apolonia Fier, Muça was substituted in 18th minute after suffering an injury in his right knee. The injury required surgery, which took place at the start of May in Austria, which kept him sidelined for 4 months, thus ending his season.

He finished the season 19 league matches, as Dinamo Tirana was crowned the Champions of Albania by winning the Albanian Superliga title for the 18th time in history. This was also Muça's first major trophy as a professional footballer.

==== 2010–2011: Return and departure ====
Muça returned to Tirana ahead of 2010–11 season, making his official debut on 17 December 2010 in a 4–0 home win over Kastrioti; he came on as a 77th-minute substitute for Sabien Lilaj.

=== Vllaznia Shkodër ===
Muça made his competitive debut with Vllaznia Shkodër on 10 September 2011 against Laçi at home, playing full-90 minutes in a 3–1 win. He terminated his contract with Vllaznia Shkodër on 14 January 2012 after falling out of favour with the coach Rudi Vata. He ended his short spell with the club by playing 16 matches between league and cup, failing to score in the process. Following his departure, Muça expressed his disappointing for the way Vllaznia released him, after he had decided to remain at the club until the end of the season.

=== Flamurtari Vlorë ===
Muça joined Flamurtari Vlorë on a free transfer in January 2012, signing an initial 6-month contract with the option of a further one year. He was handed squad number 19, and made his debut on 11 February in the match against Kazma. Muça scored his first goal in his six appearances for club during the 3–1 away win to Apolonia Fier, netting the third of the match. He completed the remainder of the 2011–12 season, featuring in 10 league games. Muça left the club following the end of the season.

=== Tirana ===
==== 2012–2014: First seasons and position change ====
In July 2012 he began negotiating with his former club Tirana about a possible return to the capital. On 14 August 2012, Muça was transferred to Tirana after he left Flamurtari a month earlier.

Muça made his return debut with the club on 6 October 2012 in the matchday six of Albanian Superliga against his former club Flamurtari Vlorë, playing in the last four minutes of the 1–1 draw. He would feature in another two minutes of a 1–0 away win over Vllaznia Shkodër on 10 November, finishing the first part of the season with only six minutes on the field. In the second part of the season, with the arrival of the new coach Nevil Dede, he found more space to play, collecting 900 minutes on the field. Muça went to play 10 consecutive matches as starter, with Tirana ending the league in the 5th position with 43 points, thus failing to secure a spot in European competitions.

In the 2013–14 season, Muça cemented his place as a starter, establishing himself as a centre-back along with Endrit Vrapi. He played his first match of the season on 1 September 2013 in a goalless draw against Laçi. He scored his first goal of the season with a penalty kick two weeks later during the 1–0 home win against Lushnja. During the first part of the season, Tirana experienced its worst period of all time, winning 3 out of 16 league matches. Muça played in the back in 10 on these matches. Tirana also changed management three times, employing Nevil Dede, Alpin Gallo and later Gugash Magani. In December, the team was ranked in the last position with only 10 points from 13 matches, 7 points away from the safe zone.

However, with Magani in charge, Tirana witnessed alteration, winning three matches in February, including the derby against cross-town rivals Partizani Tirana thanks to the winner of Gilberto. Muça continued to play as a centre-back with Magani as a coach. He scored his second goal of the season again from the penalty spot in a 3–2 away win against Kastrioti Krujë on 30 April 2014. Tirana ensured its posture in Albanian Superliga on 3 May 2014 after a 2–2 away draw against Flamurtari Vlorë in the penultimate week; Muça again played 90 minutes. He ended his second season with Tirana by playing 26 matches between league and cup, scoring twice in the process, and was named in the team of the season.

==== 2014–2017: Consecutive loans to Kukësi, challenge for the title and relegation ====
With the arrival of Ervin Bulku, Muça become the 3rd captain of the team after the captain Erando Karabeci decided to hand his captaincy to Bulku as a sign of respect of the veteran, and became the vice-captain instead. He started the new season on 24 August by playing in the opening league match against Apolonia Fier which ended in a 3–0 convincing home win. On 18 October, during the 3–1 home win against Kukësi, Muça conceded a penalty kick in the 81st minute after a handball, but his former teammate Pero Pejić missed it by hitting the crossbar. On 29 October, after coming on as a second-half substitute, Muça scored his first goal of the season in first match of the second part of the season against Apolonia Fier, helping the team to get a 0–3 away win at Loni Papuçiu Stadium. He was again in the scoresheet in the match against Elbasani at the newly renovated Elbasan Arena, heading home an Elis Bakaj cross in the 27th minute, reducing the score from 2–0 to 2–1, with Tirana winning the match in the 99th minute thanks to a late winner goal of Selemani Ndikumana.

On 12 April of the following year, in a home match against Vllaznia Shkodër valid for the 30th week of the league, Muça scored his first career brace, helping the team to overcome the disadvantage of the first half to win the game 2–1. After the match, he dedicated the goals to the former Tirona Fanatics member, Geri Allkaj, who died in a car accident two days before. He ended the season with 38 appearances in all competitions, including 32 in league, with Tirana who finished it in the fourth place and was eliminated in semi-finals of 2014–15 Albanian Cup against Laçi with the 1–0 aggregate.

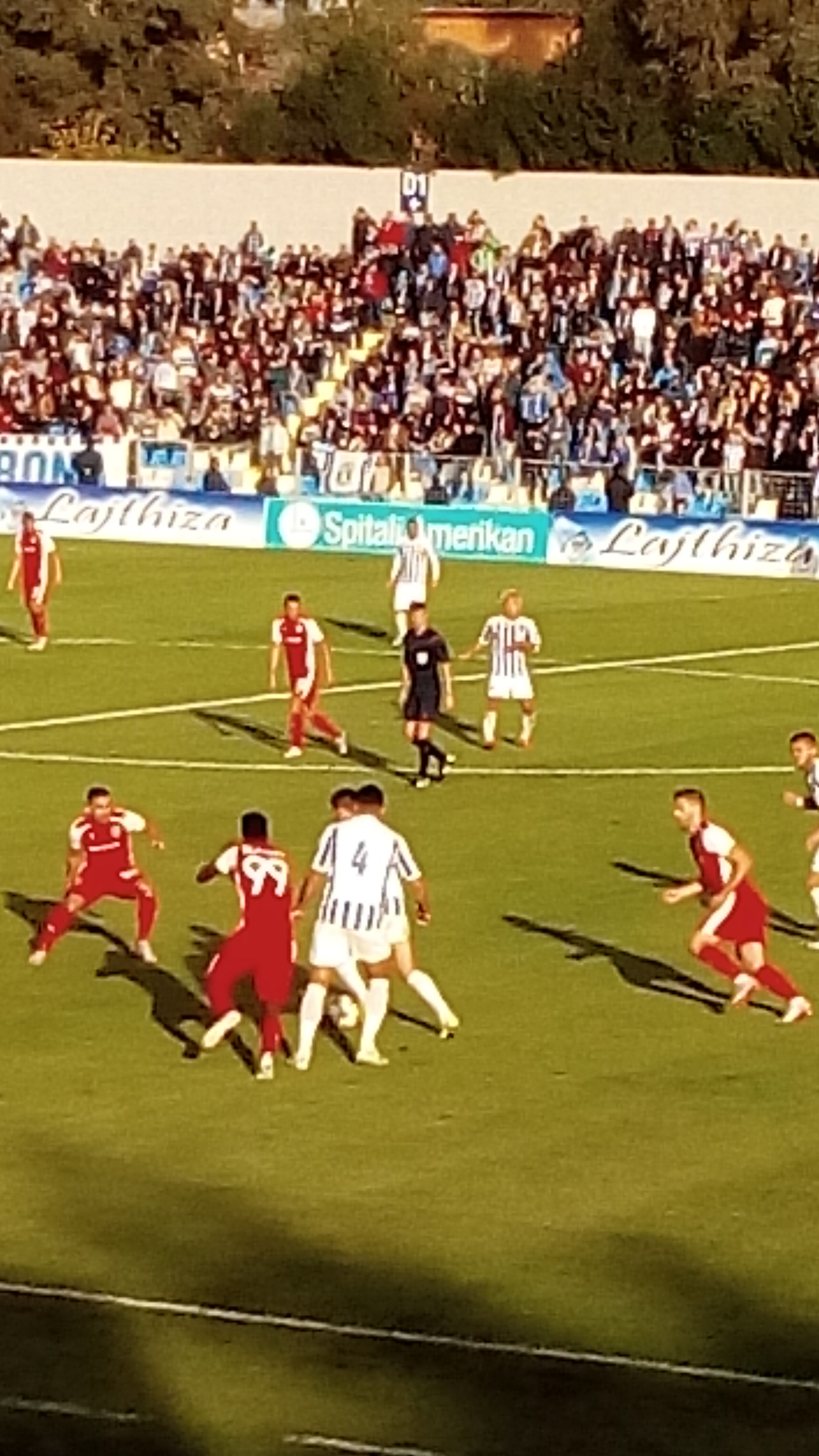
Muça (4#) in action during the inaugural match of Selman Stërmasi Stadium against Skënderbeu Korçë.

On 12 June 2015, Tirana and Kukësi reached an agreement for the loan of Muça at Kukësi for the club's Europa League matches. However, on 29 June 2015, it was the president Safet Gjici confirmed that Muça with play with Kukësi for the entire 2015–16 season. Later Muça flew out to Austria to link up with the rest of the squad where he made several appearances in friendly matches, showing a good form ahead of Europa League matches.

Kukësi begun their European campaign in the first qualifying round where they met the Belarusian side Torpedo-BelAZ Zhodino. On 2 July, in the first leg at Qemal Stafa Stadium, Muça was on starting lineup and assisted the goal of Jean Carioca in 9th minute, also helping Dmitri Stajila to keep his goal intact in an eventual 2–0 success. In the returning leg, Muça produced another solid appearance as he helped the team to get a goalless draw and to progress in the next round with the aggregate 2–0. In the next round, Kukësi was shorted with Mladost Podgorica of Montenegrin First League. In the first leg, Muça was not able to avoid the 0–1 home defeat, but in the returning leg, he had a crucial role as his team thrashed Mladost 4–2 at Podgorica City Stadium to qualifying in the next round with the aggregate 4–3.

In the first leg of the third qualifying round at Qemal Stafa Stadium, Muça was in the starting lineup against Legia Warsaw; the match was abandoned in 52nd minute where the result was 1–2, after a Legia Warsaw player was hit in the head by an object thrown from the crowd. Following that incident, UEFA awarded Legia Warsaw with a 3–0 win. In the second leg, Muça played again full-90 minutes as Kukësi suffered another defeat, this time 1–0 thanks to the lone goal of Kucharczyk. Following the end of club's European campaign, Muça decided to return at Tirana, saying that the fans were a strong reason of his return. He dubbed his spell at Kukësi as "summer love". His performances was praised by the Albania national team coach, Gianni De Biasi, who suggested the club president Safet Gjici to keep him for the entire season.

After the European campaign with Kukësi, Muça returned to Tirana by signing a new contract. On 24 August 2015, Muça made his 100th competitive appearance for Tirana in the opening league match of 2015–16 season against the newcomers of Tërbuni Pukë, helping the team to win the match 1–2. He later scored his first goal of the season, heading home from an Elis Bakaj free kick in a 2–0 home win against Teuta Durrës, helping Tirana to return in winning ways after three matches. On 23 December, in the last match of the year, Muça netted the winner as Tirana defeated Kukësi 0–1, earning the first ever victory at Zeqir Ymeri Stadium.

On 24 January 2016, in the 2015–16 Albanian Cup quarter-final first leg against Flamurtari Vlorë, Muça was booked during the first half meaning that he would miss the returning leg at Selman Stërmasi Stadium. In the first league match of 2016 against Tërbuni Pukë, Muça sealed the victory by scoring the third goal of the match in an eventual 1–3 away win. On 13 February, Muça was an unused substitute in the 2–0 home victory over Bylis Ballsh, the first win at the newly renovated Selman Stërmasi Stadium. He did not play due to his constant knee issues, that begun shortly after the match against Laçi. Three days later, Muça flew out to Salzburg, Austria to further diagnose his knee injury. On 19 February, he successfully underwent surgery that would rule him out approximately two months.

Muça made his return in the league match against Laçi where he was an unused substitute in team's 1–0 home victory. One week later, Muça made his on-field return by playing full-90 minutes in a goalless away draw against Bylis Ballsh. In the fourth derby of the season against Partizani Tirana on 4 May, Muça netted his fifth goal of the season with a header in the 28th minute, levelling the figures. In the second half, he was sent off in the 56th minute after receiving a second yellow-card for a foul on Emiljano Vila. The match ended in a 2–2 draw, as Partizani lost further ground in the title race. It was Muça's first red card after six-and-a-half-year and his second overall. Muça was banned for the league match against Flamurtari Vlorë, which ended in a 2–1 away defeat, leaving Tirana mathematically out of European competitions for the fourth consecutive season.

On 23 June 2016, Muça, just like in the previous season, was sent on loan at Kukësi for the club's 2016–17 UEFA Europa League campaign. Seven days later, in the first leg of first qualifying round against Rudar Pljevlja, Muça played for 82 minutes in an eventual 1–1 home draw.

On 5 September 2016, the Disciplinary Committee of AFA confirmed that Muça was eligible to play for Tirana in the first league match of 2016–17 after his suspension finished. His played his first match of the new season two days later against Teuta Durrës which ended in a goalless draw at Niko Dovana Stadium. On 30 March of the following year, it was confirmed that Muça was not going to play any longer this season as he was going to be operated on his back following the constant pain in Spinal disc herniation. He concluded the season with 23 appearances between league and cup, as Tirana won the cup for the 16th time in history but was relegated to Albanian First Division for the first time. Muça would later call the relegation of Tirana as the worst moment of his career.

==== 2017–present: Absence from illness, return and Albanian Superliga title ====
In July 2017, Muça, aged 30, was diagnosed with a tumor mass in the femoral head of his left thigh. At that time he already was struggling with hernia. After a surgery in November 2017 and six months of chemotherapy his bone was cleaned up. In October 2018, after a long battle, Muça got the green light to resume his football career. He confessed that he got financial support from Partizani, the cross-town rivals of Tirana.

He was registered in the team for the 2018–19 season, being on the bench for the first time in a 4–1 home win over Kamza on 27 January 2019. Later on 22 February, Muça entered as a late substitute for Bedri Greca in the 2–1 away win against Skënderbeu, making his first appearance of the season and the first in 717 days. He made only three appearances in the 2018–19 season, collecting only 5 minutes, as Tirana barely avoided relegation.

Muça was a regular starter during the 2019–20 Albanian Superliga season, scoring one goal in 27 appearances, as Tirana won the championship title for the 25th time in their 100th anniversary. It was his first championship with Tirana and the second overall. On 8 August, he signed a new one-year contract with the club.

== International career ==
He earned a surprise call-up to the full national side in November 2009 by Josip Kuže for a friendly against Estonia. However, knee ligament damage in February 2010 whilst at Dinamo Tirana meant that he was unable to play for Albania, as he underwent surgery on his knee in Austria at the start of May, keeping out of action for over four months. On 17 February 2010, Muça played in a match for the Albania team, a friendly against Kosovo, where he played a full 90 minutes in a 2–3 away win.

== Controversies ==
Muça become the central figure of the controversial match against cross-town rivals Partizani Tirana on 20 May 2016; twenty minutes after conclusion of the match, Muça, who is widely known as a "Tirona Fanatics" member, took the megaphone and begun singing with the home crowd. His choirs had contents against them and communism, also comparing Partizani to Partizan Belgrade, which created many controversies in the country. One week after the event occurred, Muça was accused of public incitement of hatred, and was banned for one year from all competitions by the Disciplinary Committee of Albanian Football Association, effective immediately.

Muça became the first player in the history of Albanian football to be banned for public incitement of hatred. Via an official statement, KF Tirana stated that the club would appeal the decision. Muça himself defended his actions in a press conference by stating that he was singing with the home crowd as a fan, not as a player. He stated:

Yesterday during the preparations I heard about the decision. I didn't take it well. I'm a footballer, not a criminal. During my career I've received only two red cards and I'd never been subject to judgment on disciplinary committees. I practice religion and have not been in any way intended to incite violence, hatred or using racist expressions. I am a Tirana fan, and as such, twenty minutes after the match had finished, I sang with the fans. The songs are only the fans' expression which are always sung in the stadiums. The match referee did not interrupt the match when the songs were sung during the game. I believe that the Appeals Committee will review the decision and I will return to playing football. I'm at the peak of my career and this decision is killing me. I thank the fans for the support they give me. I am one of them.

It was also reported that when Muça first heard about the decision, he interrupted the training and that his teammates were shocked. However, following the appeal from Tirana, the Disciplinary Committee of AFA reduced his suspension from one year to only six matches.

== Personal life ==
Muça is a practising Muslim. He was the only football player that agreed to participate in the project "The game of friendship" between Albania and Serbia. He is known as a big fan of Albanian club Tirana, his boyhood club, and is also member of Tirona Fanatics, club's main supporters group. Muça also attend the Economic Technical School. He married his fiancée Agin on 16 October 2016. A short ceremony was held on the same day at Selman Stërmasi Stadium before the match against Skënderbeu Korçë.

== Career statistics ==
=== Club ===
As of 1 July 2016

Appearances and goals by club, season and competition
Club	Season	League			Cup		Continental		Other		Total	
Club	Season	Division	Apps	Goals	Apps	Goals	Apps	Goals	Apps	Goals	Apps	Goals
Osterholz-Scharmbeck	2007–08	Oberliga	9	0	—		—		—		9	0
Bylis Ballsh	2008–09	Albanian Superliga	28	2	4	0	—		—		32	2
Dinamo Tirana	2009–10	Albanian Superliga	19	3	5	1	1 (Note: Appearance(s) in UEFA Europa League)	0	—		25	4
Tirana	2010–11	Albanian Superliga	14	0	5	1	0	0	0	0	19	1
Tirana	2011–12	Albanian Superliga	—		—		—		1 (Note: Appearance in Albanian Supercup)	0	1	0
Tirana	Total		14	0	5	1	0	0	1	0	20	1
Vllaznia Shkodër	2011–12	Albanian Superliga	13	0	3	0	—		—		16	0
Flamurtari Vlorë	2011–12	Albanian Superliga	10	1	6	0	—		—		16	1
Tirana	2012–13	Albanian Superliga	12	0	2	0	0	0	0	0	14	0
Tirana	2013–14	Albanian Superliga	25	2	1	0	—		—		26	2
Tirana	2014–15	Albanian Superliga	33	6	6	0	—		—		39	6
Tirana	2015–16	Albanian Superliga	25	5	4	0	—		—		29	5
Tirana	2016–17	Albanian Superliga	18	1	4	0	—		—		22	1
Tirana	2017–18	Albanian First Division	0	0	0	0	—		—		0	0
Tirana	Total		113	14	17	0	0	0	0	0	130	14
Career total			203	20	40	2	8	0	1	0	243	22

=== International ===
As of 31 January 2016

Albania national team
Year	Apps	Goals
2009	0	0
Total	0	0

== Honours ==
Dinamo Tirana

- Albanian Superliga: 2009–10

Tirana

- Albanian Superliga: 2019–20, 2021–22
- Albanian First Division: 2017–18
- Albanian Cup: 2010–11, 2016–17
- Albanian Supercup: 2011, 2012, 2017

Prishtina

- Kosovo Superliga: 2020–21
- Kosovar Supercup: 2020

Individual

- Albanian Superliga Player of the Month: February 2014
