= Ergys Sorra =

Albanian footballer

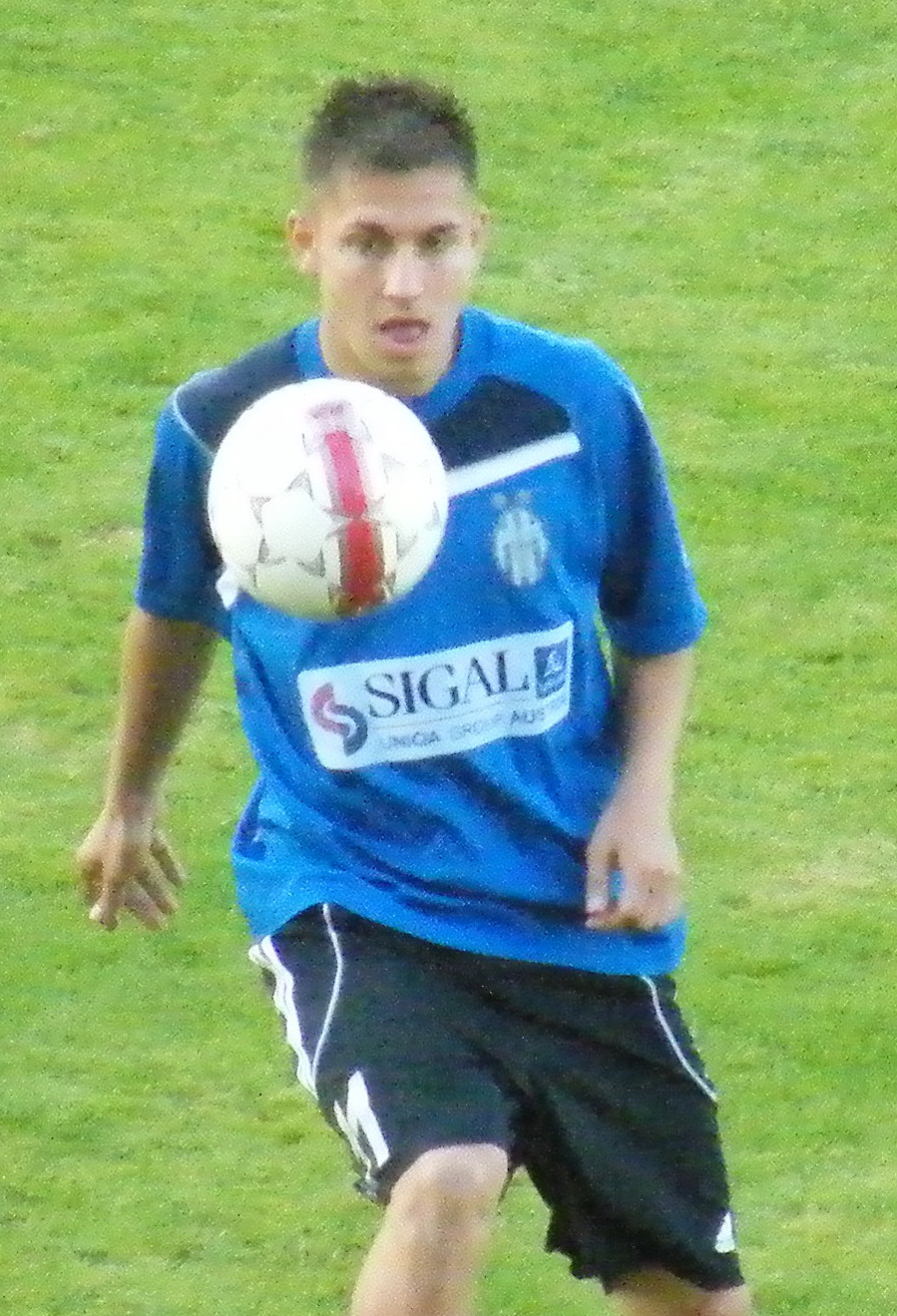

Personal information
- Full name: Ergys Sorra
- Date of birth: July 30, 1989 (age 37)
- Place of birth: Tirana, Albania
- Height: 1.79 m (5 ft 10 in)
- Position: Striker

Youth career
- 200x–2007: Tirana

Senior career*
Years	Team	Apps	(Gls)
2007–2011	Tirana	19	(2)
2011–2012	Dinamo Tirana	2	(0)
2012–2013	Luftëtari	0	(0)
2013	Dinamo Tirana	8	(2)
2013–2016	Tirana	1	(0)
2014–2015	→ Dinamo Tirana (loan)	9	(0)

International career^{‡}
2005	Albania U17	3	(0)
2007–2008	Albania U19	3	(0)
- * Club domestic league appearances and goals as of 16 May 2015 ‡ National team caps and goals as of 1 April 2010

Ergys Sorra (born 30 July 1989) is an Albanian professional footballer who plays as a striker.

== Club career ==
=== Tirana ===
Sorra made his debut for Tirana in round 31 of the 2007–08 Albanian Superliga on 10 May 2008 in a 1–0 away loss to Besëlidhja Lezhë. He came on as a substitute for Berat Hyseni in the 68th minute of the game marking his first and only league appearance of the season.

His first league goal came on 16 May of the following year in the 2009–10 Albanian Superliga matchday 32 against city rivals Dinamo Tirana; he came again as substitute for Entonio Pashaj and netted in 73rd minute to put Tirana 3–1 up and sealed the victory despite Dinamo's Elis Bakaj scoring late on in the game.

Sorra wore the number 11 jersey for the 2009–10 season, changing from his previous number 18 jersey.

=== Luftëtari Gjirokastër ===
On 18 July 2012, Sorra joined top flight side Luftëtari Gjirokastër by penning a one-year contract. During his short spell at the club, Sorra made only two cup appearances, starting in both first round legs against Gramshi.

=== Dinamo Tirana ===
In January 2013, Sorra completed a transfer at Dinamo Tirana.

=== Tirana return ===
In July 2013, Sorra returned to Tirana.

Sorra was sent on loan at fellow capital side Dinamo Tirana for the 2014–15 season. During the course of season, Sorra made 9 league appearances and two cup appearances.

Sorra was registered as Tirana player for the 2015–16 season. He didn't make any league appearance during that season and wasn't even on the bench. He did however played one cup match on 4 November 2015 against Kastrioti Krujë in the second leg of second round.

== International career ==
Sorra burst on to the international scene in 2005, where he was called up to the under-17 squad. Later in April 2007, he was part of the under-19 side coached by Ramadan Shehu that participated in Slovakia Cup 2007. He played in all three matches against Slovakia, Croatia and Poland with Albania losing all and failing to score a single goal.

== Career statistics ==
As of 4 November 2015

Club statistics
Club	Season	League			Cup		Europe		Total	
Club	Season	Division	Apps	Goals	Apps	Goals	Apps	Goals	Apps	Goals
Tirana	2007–08	Albanian Superliga	1	0	0	0	—		1	0
Tirana	2008–09	Albanian Superliga	4	1	2	1	—		6	2
Tirana	2009–10	Albanian Superliga	7	1	1	0	0	0	8	1
Tirana	2010–11	Albanian Superliga	7	0	3	1	1 (Note: All appearance(s) in UEFA Europa League)	0	11	1
Tirana	2011–12	Albanian Superliga	0	0	3	0	0	0	3	0
Tirana	Total		19	2	9	2	1	0	29	4
Dinamo Tirana	2011–12	Albanian Superliga	2	0	0	0	—		2	0
Luftëtari Gjirokastër	2012–13	Albanian Superliga	0	0	2	0	—		2	0
Dinamo Tirana	2012–13	Albanian First Division	8	2	0	0	—		8	2
Tirana	2013–14	Albanian Superliga	1	0	0	0	—		1	0
Tirana	2015–16	Albanian Superliga	0	0	1	0	—		1	0
Tirana	Total		1	0	1	0	—		2	0
Dinamo Tirana (loan)	2014–15	Albanian First Division	9	0	2	0	—		11	0
Career total			39	4	14	2	1	0	54	6
