= Fatjon =

- Gender: Male

Origin
- Region of origin: Albania, Kosovo

Fatjon is a masculine given name of Albanian origin. Notable people with the name include:

== Given name ==
- Fatjon Andoni (born 1991), Albanian footballer
- Fatjon Bunjaku (2003–2026), Kosovan footballer
- Fatjon Bushati (born 1998), Kosovan footballer
- Fatjon Celani (born 1992), Albanian-German footballer
- Fatjon Sefa (born 1984), Albanian footballer
- Fatjon Tafaj (born 1982), Albanian footballer
- Fatjon Topi (born 1982), Albanian footballer
