= Roland Dervishi =

Albanian retired football striker

Personal information
- Full name: Roland Dervishi
- Date of birth: 16 February 1982 (age 44)
- Place of birth: Peqin, Albania
- Height: 1.87 m (6 ft 2 in)
- Position: Striker

Senior career*
Years	Team	Apps	(Gls)
1998–2016	Shkumbini	218	(57)
2005–2006	→ Lushnja (loan)	13	(3)
2010	→ Elbasani (loan)	13	(11)

International career^{‡}
2000	Albania U18	3	(0)
- * Club domestic league appearances and goals as of 27 July 2016 ‡ National team caps and goals as of 27 July 2015

Roland Dervishi (born 16 February 1982) is an Albanian retired football striker who played the majority of his career for hometown club Shkumbini Peqin in the Albanian First Division.

== Club career ==
Dervishi spent most of his professional career playing with Shkumbini Peqin, playing more than 200 appearances in both Albanian Superliga and Albanian First Division. He was with the club since turning professional in 1998, but was on loan to both KS Lushnja and KF Elbasani. He won the Golden Boot after scoring 20 goals during the 2011–12 season for Shkumbini.

== International career ==
Dervishi has been a former youth international player of Albania, playing three matches with U18 side, failing to score any goal.

== Statistics ==
=== Clubs ===
As of 8 July 2015

Club	Season	League		Cup		Continental (Note: Including continental competitions, such as UEFA Champions League and UEFA Europa League)		Other (Note: Including other competitions, such as Albanian Supercup and Albanian Superliga's play-off)		Total	
Club	Season	Apps	Goals	Apps	Goals	Apps	Goals	Apps	Goals	Apps	Goals
Shkumbini Peqin
Shkumbini Peqin	2006–07	15	2	0	0	–	–	–	–	15	2
Shkumbini Peqin	2007–08	20	2	0	0	–	–	–	–	20	2
Shkumbini Peqin	2008–09	26	3	0	0	–	–	–	–	26	3
Shkumbini Peqin	2009–10	13	5	0	0	–	–	–	–	13	5
Shkumbini Peqin	2010–11	26	2	2	0	–	–	1	0	29	2
Shkumbini Peqin	2011–12	25	20	1	0	–	–	–	–	26	20
Shkumbini Peqin	2012–13	16	2	1	0	–	–	–	–	17	2
Shkumbini Peqin	2013–14	18	6	1	0	–	–	–	–	19	6
Shkumbini Peqin	2014–15	18	2	1	0	–	–	–	–	19	2
Shkumbini Peqin	Total	172	43	6	0	0	0	1	0	180	44
Career total		172	43	6	0	0	0	1	0	180	44

== Honours ==
=== Individual ===
- Albanian Superliga Golden Boot (1): 2011–12
