= Ervis Kaja =

Albanian footballer

Personal information
- Date of birth: 29 July 1987 (age 39)
- Place of birth: Përmet, Albania
- Height: 1.84 m (6 ft 0 in)
- Position: Centre-back

Team information
- Current team: ATSV Erlangen
- Number: 4

Senior career*
Years	Team	Apps	(Gls)
2006–2009	Besa	10	(0)
2009–2011	Laçi	62	(5)
2011–2012	Tomori	11	(0)
2012	Dinamo Tirana	10	(0)
2012–2013	Besa	21	(1)
2013–2014	Tirana	13	(0)
2014–2016	Apolonia	53	(4)
2016–2017	Korabi	30	(2)
2017	Besa	8	(1)
2018	Liria Prizren		
2018	Drita	11	(1)
2019	Dinamo Tirana	12	(0)
2019–2020	ATSV Erlangen	10	(0)
2020–2023	TS 1899 Fürth		
2023	SSV Elektra Nürnberg		
2023–	ATSV Erlangen	3	(0)
- * Club domestic league appearances and goals as of 29 September 2023

Ervis Kaja (born 29 July 1987) is an Albanian professional footballer who plays as a centre-back for German Bayernliga Nord club ATSV Erlangen.

== Career ==
On 30 August 2013, KF Tirana announced the signing of Kaja on a one-year contract. He commenced the season on 1 September by starting the team first match of league, a goalless home draw against Laçi. Tirana struggled for results in the first part of the season, ending it in the last place only 10 points from 13 matches, 7 points away from the safe zone. Kaja lost his place in the starting lineup in the second part of the season as Tirana witnessed alteration, securing another season in top flight after a 2–2 draw versus Flamurtari Vlorë on 3 May 2014. He left the club following the end of the season, making 15 appearances, including 13 in league.

On 7 August 2014, Kaja returned to Laçi after a three-year absence by signing for an undisclosed fee. However, he left the club after only 19 days by terminating his contract for unknown reasons, becoming a free agent in the process.

On 1 September 2014, Kaja completed a transfer to Apolonia Fier by signing a three-year contract. In January 2015, it was rumoured that Kaja was about to leave the club but it was the player himself who denied all the rumours. He explained the situation by saying that he didn't train with the team in the last days due to some school obligations in Tirana.

On 27 July 2016, Kaja joined newly promoted Albanian Superliga side Korabi Peshkopi, signing for an undisclosed fee along with eight other players. He was a regular starter during the 2016–17 season, making 30 league appearances as Korabi finished last in the championship, returning in First Division after one season. He left the team following the end of the season.

On 29 August 2017, Kaja remained on top flight by joining Lushnja. However, he left the club only 11 days later by terminating his contract, stating that he main reason were financial terms.

On 11 September 2017, Kaja joined his first club Besa Kavajë as a free agent. The transfer was made official three days later, with the player signing a one-year contract. He made his first appearance in the opening matchday of 2017–18 Albanian First Division against Dinamo Tirana, helping the team to keep a clean sheet. On 28 October, he received a red card in the 5–1 home defeat to Egnatia. Five days later, he was banned for two league matches by Disciplinary Committee of AFA for dangerous play. Kaja left the club in December 2017 due to club's financial and organizational issues. Besa finished the first part of the season far away from their initial goal.

In January 2018, Kaja left Albania and joined Football Superleague of Kosovo outfit Liria Prizren for the remainder of the 2017–18 season.

On 19 August 2018, Kaja joined Drita for the 2018–19 campaign. However, after 11 appearances and one goal, scored on his debut against Flamurtari Pristina on 26 August, Kaja terminated his contract with the club by mutual consent with the aim of returning to Albania.

At the end of August 2019, Kaja moved to Germany and joined ATSV Erlangen under charge of Kosovan manager Shqipran Skeraj. On 2 February 2020 it was confirmed, that his contract had been terminated after 10 games.

== Style of play ==
Apart from playing as a centre-back, Kaja can also play as a central midfielder.

== Career statistics ==
As of 2 December 2018

Appearances and goals by club, season and competition
Club	Season	League			Cup		Europe		Total	
Club	Season	Division	Apps	Goals	Apps	Goals	Apps	Goals	Apps	Goals
Laçi	2009–10	Albanian Superliga	32	3	0	0	—		32	3
Laçi	2010–11	Albanian Superliga	30	2	2	0	2 (Note: Appearance in UEFA Europa League)	0	34	2
Laçi	Total		62	5	2	0	2	0	66	5
Tomori Berat	2011–12	Albanian Superliga	11	0	0	0	—		11	0
Dinamo Tirana	2011–12	Albanian Superliga	10	0	0	0	—		10	0
Besa Kavajë	2012–13	Albanian Superliga	21	1	2	1	—		23	1
Tirana	2013–14	Albanian Superliga	13	0	2	0	—		15	0
Apolonia Fier	2014–15	Albanian Superliga	29	0	5	0	—		34	0
Apolonia Fier	2015–16	Albanian First Division	24	4	2	0	—		26	4
Apolonia Fier	Total		53	4	7	0	—		60	4
Korabi Peshkopi	2016–17	Albanian Superliga	30	2	2	0	—		32	2
Besa Kavajë	2017–18	Albanian First Division	8	1	0	0	—		8	1
Liria	2017–18	Football Superleague of Kosovo	0	0	0	0	—		0	0
Drita	2018–19	Football Superleague of Kosovo	11	1	0	0	—		11	1
Career total			219	14	15	1	2	0	236	15

== Honours ==
Besa Kavajë

- Albanian Cup: 2006–07
