= Mario Morina =

Albanian footballer

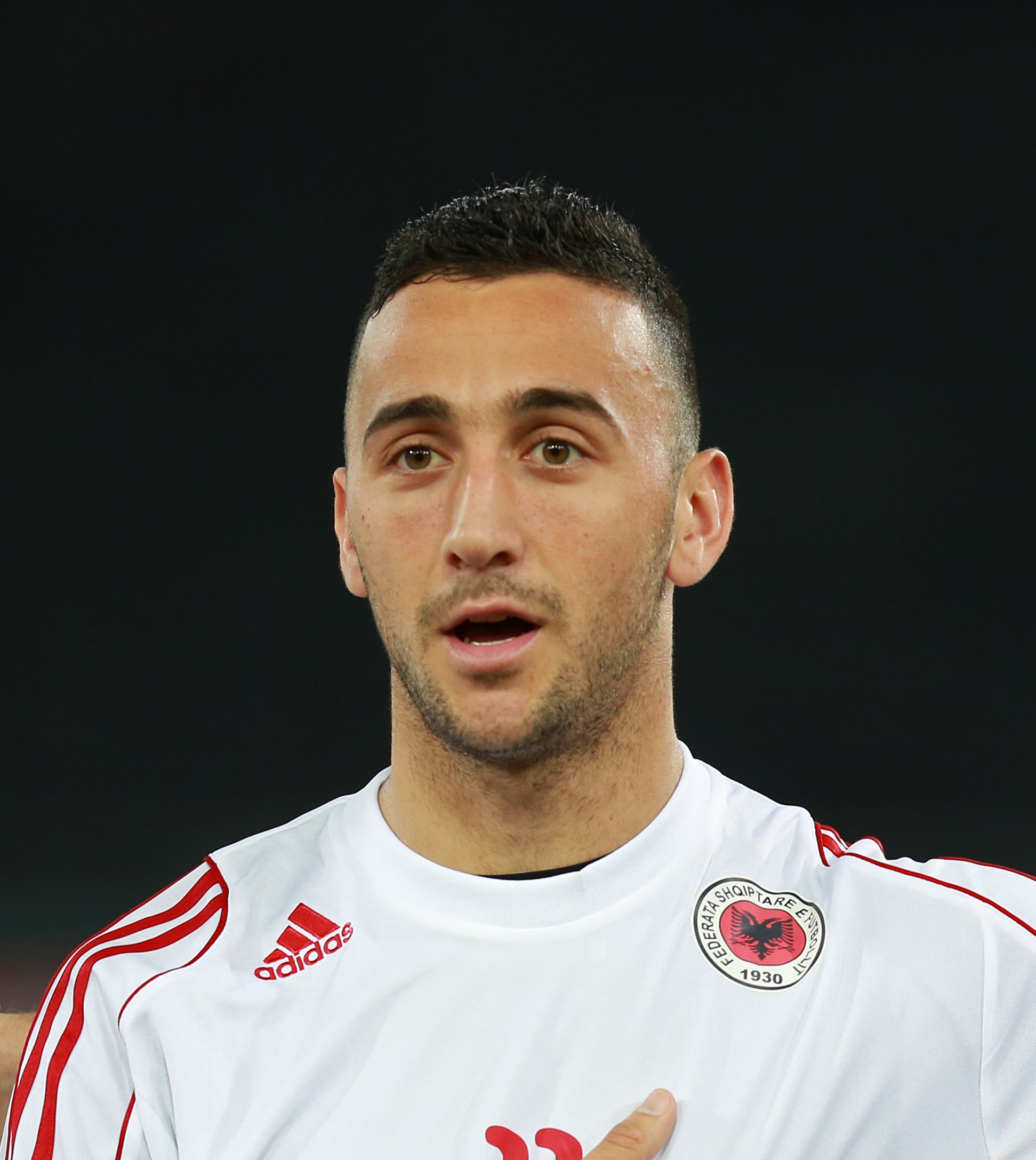

Personal information
- Full name: Mario Morina
- Date of birth: 16 October 1992 (age 34)
- Place of birth: Tirana, Albania
- Height: 1.83 m (6 ft 0 in)
- Position: Forward

Youth career
- 2008–2010: Tirana

Senior career*
Years	Team	Apps	(Gls)
2010–2013	Tirana	63	(13)
2013	Skënderbeu Korçë	13	(2)
2014–2015	Tirana	40	(10)
2015	Flamurtari Vlorë	8	(1)
2016	Kukësi	7	(0)
2016–2017	Kamza	23	(10)
2017	Besa Kavajë	6	(4)
2018	Dinamo Tirana	8	(0)
2018–2019	Prishtina	26	(8)
2019	Luftëtari	0	(0)
2020	Tirana	4	(0)
2020	Tirana B	1	(0)

International career
2011–2015	Albania U21	3	(0)
- * Club domestic league appearances and goals as of 20:23, 8 December 2020 (UTC)

Mario Morina (born 16 October 1992) is an Albanian professional footballer who plays as a forward.

== Club career ==
=== Tirana ===
==== 2010–11 season ====
Morina made his début for Tirana on 3 November 2010 in an Albanian Cup fixture at home against Skrapari. Morina was included in the starting line up, with fellow youngsters Blerti Hajdari and Enco Malindi. Morina played a role in his side's 4–0 win, including an assist for Hajdari, striking the post and winning a penalty, which would be converted by Hajdari. Tirana coach Nevil Dede praised the player after the game ended and stated that the youngster was in his plans for the near future.

He would only have to wait until 20 November for his first league game, a home game against Elbasani. Morina took the place of striker Sebino Plaku in the 71st minute when the score was 2–1 in favour of Tirana. In the 93rd minute of the game he marked his league début with a goal.

==== 2011–12 season ====
During 2011–12 season, despite the fact that he had rivalry in attack with Herby Fortunat and Mirel Çota, Morina was able to appear in 22 league matches, scoring four times, including the winners against Laçi and Flamurtari Vlorë respectively on 17 December 2011 and 18 March 2012. He was an unused substitute in team's victory in 2011 Albanian Supercup against Skënderbeu Korçë, in a match delayed and disrupted by crowd trouble. Morina was also an important instrument in 2011–12 Albanian Cup, playing 14 matches and scoring 7 goals; he scored for the first time in his career 5 goals in the second leg of first round against Himara as Tirana won 7–1 and progressed 10–1 on aggregate. He also scored against Laçi and Kamza in Group 1 of quarter-finals, with Tirana who went to win the title for the second consecutive season, beating once again Skënderbeu in the final thanks to the winner of Bekim Balaj.

==== 2012–13 season ====
Morina started his third season with "white&blues" by winning 2012 Albanian Supercup on 19 August against Skënderbeu Korçë. He scored his first goals of the season on 2 September in a 3–0 home win against Shkumbini Peqin. Twentyfour days later, in the capital derby against the rivals of Partizani Tirana in the second leg of the Albanian Cup first round, Morina scored the opener after only 8 minutes as Tirana won 2–1, securing the progression to the second round.

=== Skënderbeu Korçë ===
On 10 June 2013, Morina was presented as the new Skënderbeu Korçë player, taking the squad number 9 last worn by fellow striker Sebino Plaku ahead of 2013–14 season. He made his competitive debut for the club on 23 July in the returning leg of Champions League second qualifying round against Neftçi PFK at home; he entered the field as a 77th-minute substitute in place of Gilman Lika and in the 116th minute assisted the goal of Nurudeen Orelesi. Skënderbeu won the match 1–0 and the tie with the same result, progressing to the third qualifying round of Champions League for the first time in history.

=== Return to Tirana ===
He returned to his boyhood club Tirana in January 2014 with the club struggling in a relegation battle. With the help of Morina and his 5 league goals the club managed to escape relegation, marking a successful end of season for the club and player, which saw him voted as the talent of the year for 2014.

On 13 July 2014, Morina signed a contract extension with Tirana, which will keep him in the capital until 2015. Only one day later, he was sent on loan to Laçi for the club's first leg of 2014–15 UEFA Europa League second qualifying round against Zorya Luhansk. He played 40 minutes in the first half before being replaced by Jetmir Sefa as Laçi was defeated 0–3 at home.

=== Kukësi ===
On 27 January 2016, following his departure from Flamurtari Vlorë, Morina joined fellow Albanian Superliga side Kukësi on a free transfer, signing a contract until the end of the season. There, he found his former Tirana teammate Klodian Duro as the team's coach, who strongly required his acquisition. He made his league debut with the club four days later, appearing as a late substitute for fellow debutant Izair Emini in team's 3–0 home victory over Bylis Ballsh.

=== Kamza ===
After being a free agent for almost two months, Morina joined Albanian First Division side Kamza by signing a one-year contract on 19 August 2016.

=== Besa Kavajë ===
On 11 September 2017, Morina completed a transfer to Besa Kavajë by penning a one-year contract. He played his first match for the team in the second matchday against Besëlidhja Lezhë as a substitute in a 2–0 away loss.

=== Dinamo Tirana ===
On 31 January 2018, on the deadline day, Morina agreed personal terms and joined fellow Albanian First Division side Dinamo Tirana on a contract until the end of the season.

=== Prishtina ===
On 14 August 2018, Prishtina of Football Superleague of Kosovo announced to have signed Morina on a one-year contract, reuniting him with his former manager Mirel Josa.

=== Second return to Tirana ===
On 28 January 2019, Tirana announced to have signed Morina on a deal lasting until the end of 2019–20 season, after the player had been training with the team for two months following his departure from Prishtina.

== International career ==
For the qualifiers of 2015 UEFA Euro U-21, Albania was seeded in Group 4. On 14 August 2013, Morina made his Albania U21 debut in a 0–1 home defeat to Austria, appearing a second-half substitute. A month later, he would play another match as a substitute in a 4–0 defeat against th reigning champions of Spain. On 5 March 2014, in the last qualifying match against Austria at UPC-Arena, Morina started and played full-90 minutes, helping his side to win the match 3–1 and to end the qualifying campaign with style.

== Career statistics ==
As of 21 April 2018

Club statistics
Club	Season	League			Cup		Europe		Other		Total	
Club	Season	Division	Apps	Goals	Apps	Goals	Apps	Goals	Apps	Goals	Apps	Goals
Tirana	2010–11	Albanian Superliga	17	3	3	0	—		—		20	3
Tirana	2011–12	Albanian Superliga	22	4	14	7	—		0	0	36	11
Tirana	2012–13	Albanian Superliga	24	6	4	2	3 (Note: All appearance(s) in UEFA Europa League)	0	0	0	31	8
Tirana	Total		63	13	21	9	3	0	0	0	88	22
Skënderbeu Korçë	2013–14	Albanian Superliga	13	2	3	2	3 (Note: Two appearances in UEFA Champions League, one appearance in UEFA Europa League)	0	1 (Note: Appearance in Albanian Supercup)	0	20	4
Tirana	2013–14	Albanian Superliga	14	5	—		—		—		14	5
Tirana	2014–15	Albanian Superliga	26	3	3	1	—		—		29	4
Tirana	Total		40	8	3	1	—		—		43	9
Laçi (loan)	2014–15	Albanian Superliga	—		—		1	0	—		1	0
Flamurtari Vlorë	2015–16	Albanian Superliga	8	1	2	1	—		—		10	2
Kukësi	2015–16	Albanian Superliga	7	0	2	0	—		—		9	0
Kamza	2016–17	Albanian First Division	24	10	1	0	—		—		25	10
Besa Kavajë	2017–18	Albanian First Division	6	4	1	0	—		—		7	4
Dinamo Tirana	2017–18	Albanian First Division	8	0	0	0	—		—		8	0
Prishtina	2018–19	Football Superleague of Kosovo	0	0	0	0	—		—		0	0
Career total			169	38	34	13	7	0	1	0	211	51

== Honours ==
=== Club ===
Tirana

- Albanian Superliga: 2019–20
- Albanian Cup: 2010–11, 2011–12
- Albanian Supercup: 2011, 2012

Skënderbeu Korçë

- Albanian Supercup: 2013

Kukesi

- Albanian Cup: 2015–16

Kamza

- Albanian First Division: 2016–17

=== Individual ===
- Albanian Superliga Talent of the Season: 2013–14
