= Entonio Pashaj =

Albanian professional footballer (born 1984)

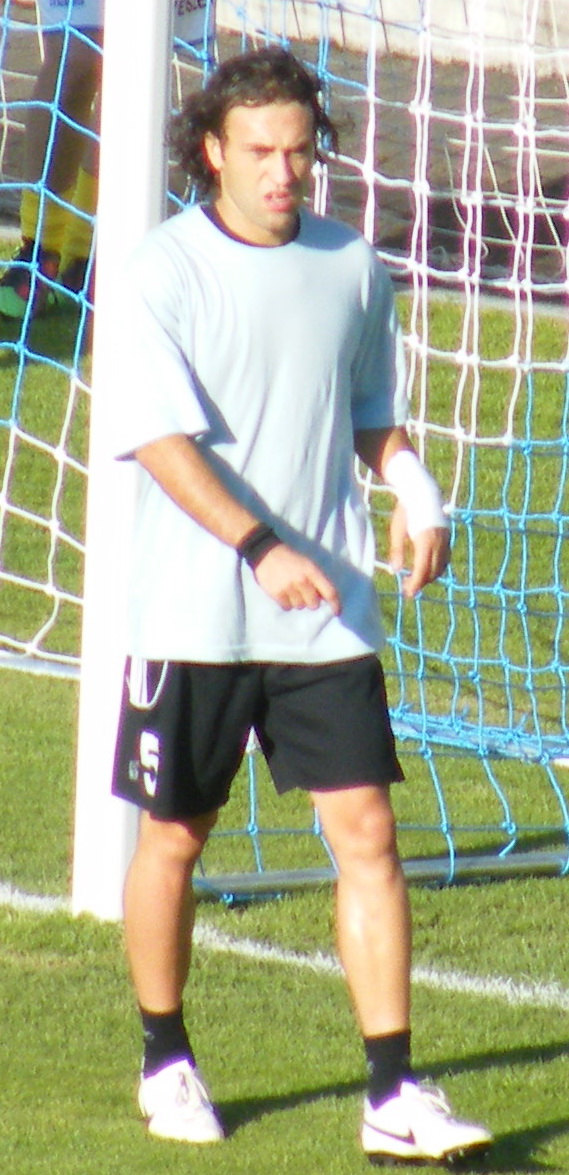

Personal information
- Date of birth: 10 November 1984 (age 42)
- Place of birth: Tirana, Albania
- Height: 1.85 m (6 ft 1 in)
- Position: Centre-back

Youth career
- 2002–2003: FC Nacionali Tiranë

Senior career*
Years	Team	Apps	(Gls)
2003	Partizani	3	(0)
2004	Besëlidhja		
2004	Egnatia	48	(4)
2005–2008	Teuta	63	(8)
2008–2015	Tirana	100	(6)
2011–2012	→ Kastrioti (loan)	22	(0)
2015–2016	Flamurtari	29	(0)
2016–2017	Kukësi	17	(0)
2018–2022	KFC Eppegem		

International career
2005	Albania U21	4	(0)
- * Club domestic league appearances and goals

Entonio Pashaj (born 10 November 1984) is an Albanian professional footballer who plays as a centre-back. He was also deployed as a right-back or defensive midfielder.

== Club career ==
=== Early career ===
Pashaj started playing in 2003 with hometown team Partizani Tirana. He spent half season at the club making three appearances. This opted him to move to Egnatia. He became a regular at the newly promoted club and had an impressive season. He then left to join Teuta Durrës in the summer of 2005. He played for the Durrës based club for three seasons, in those seasons he helped them qualify for the UEFA Cup. He was able to play one UEFA Cup game, this came on 19 July 2007 against a very strong Slaven Belupo side in Croatia.

=== Tirana ===
Pashaj completed a move to the most successful club in Albania, Tirana, during the summer transfer window of 2008. He won the Albanian Superliga title in his first season at the club, appearing in three matches.

Pashaj confirmed his return to Tirana on 12 June 2012, signing a two-year contract. He stated that despite contact from Albanian champions Skënderbeu Korçë, Flamurtari Vlorë, Vllaznia Shkodër and a host of foreign clubs.

On 22 August 2015, Pashaj left the club by terminating his contract, after he refused to sign a new contract with Tirana.

=== Flamurtari Vlorë ===
On 24 August 2015, Pashaj joined the ambitious side Flamurtari Vlorë, signing a one-year contract. There he reunited with Mario Morina, who signed with the club a couple of days earlier. Four days later, in the second matchday of Albanian Superliga season against Partizani Tirana, Pashaj and Morina started but were unable to avoid the 2–1 away lose; Pashaj conceded a 95th-minute penalty-kick, receiving a straight red card in the process.

=== Kukësi ===
On 2 August 2016, Pashaj completed a move to Kukësi by signing a one-year contract, and was presented to the media on the same day. He made 17 league appearances throughout the season as Kukësi won their first ever Albanian Superliga title.

=== KFC Eppegem ===
Pashaj later played for Belgian amateur side KFC Eppegem, becoming a regular at the newly promoted club.

== International career ==
Pashaj is a former youth member of Albania, representing four times the under-21 side. Pashaj in his career played 12 UEFA Europa League matches and 4 Champions League matches

== Career statistics ==
As of 27 May 2017

Appearances and goals by club, season and competition
Club	Season	League			Cup		Continental		Other		Total	
Club	Season	Division	Apps	Goals	Apps	Goals	Apps	Goals	Apps	Goals	Apps	Goals
Partizani Tirana	2003–04	Albanian Superliga	3	0	0	0	—		—		0	0
Egnatia	2004–05	Albanian Superliga	48	4		4	—		—		?	?
Teuta Durrës	2005–06	Albanian Superliga	23	3		3	—		—		1	0
Teuta Durrës	2006–07	Albanian Superliga	16	0	0	0	—		—		6	0
Teuta Durrës	2007–08	Albanian Superliga	24	1	0	2	1 (Note: Appearance(s) in UEFA Cup)	0	—		16	1
Teuta Durrës	Total		63	8	0	8	1	0	—		23	1
Tirana	2008–09	Albanian Superliga	3	0	0	0	0	0	—		3	0
Tirana	2009–10	Albanian Superliga	28	2	3	0	1 (Note: Appearance(s) in UEFA Champions League)	0	1 (Note: Appearance in Albanian Supercup)	0	33	0
Tirana	2010–11	Albanian Superliga	14	0	4	0	4 (Note: Appearance(s) in UEFA Europa League)	0	0	0	22	0
Tirana	2011–12	Albanian Superliga	0	0	0	0	1	0	1	0	2	0
Tirana	2012–13	Albanian Superliga	15	1	4	0	4	0	1	0	24	0
Tirana	2013–14	Albanian Superliga	21	1	4	0	—		—		25	4
Tirana	2014–15	Albanian Superliga	19	2	5	1	—		—		24	1
Tirana	Total		100	6	20	1	10	0	3	0	133	2
Flamurtari Vlorë	2015–16	Albanian Superliga	29	0	7	0	—		—		36	0
Kukësi	2016–17	Albanian Superliga	17	0	2	0	—		0	0	19	0
Career total			282		37	1	11	0	3	0	240	3

== Honours ==
Teuta

- Albanian Cup: 2004–05

Tirana

- Albanian Superliga: 2008–09
- Albanian Cup: 2010–11
- Albanian Supercup: 2009, 2011, 2012

Kukësi

- Albanian Superliga: 2016–17
- Albanian Supercup: 2016
