= Endrit Vrapi =

Albanian footballer

Endri Vrapi
Personal information
- Full name: Endri Vrapi
- Date of birth: 23 May 1982 (age 44)
- Place of birth: Tirana, Albania
- Height: 1.77 m (5 ft 10 in)
- Position: Defender

Youth career
- Shkëndija Tiranë
- 1998–2002: Partizani Tirana

Senior career*
Years	Team	Apps	(Gls)
2002	Partizani Tirana	0	(0)
2003–2005	Lushnja	76	(4)
2005–2006	Elbasani	34	(2)
2006–2007	Teuta Durrës	29	(2)
2007–2008	Tirana	27	(0)
2008–2009	Elbasani	31	(2)
2009	Dinamo Tirana	0	(0)
2009–2010	Besa Kavajë	28	(0)
2010–2013	Skënderbeu Korçë	68	(0)
2013–2014	Tirana	23	(1)
2014–2016	Partizani Tirana	32	(0)
2016–2017	Vllaznia Shkodër	44	(2)
2017–2018	Liria Prizren	9	(0)

International career
2000–2001	Albania U18	3	(0)
2008–2011	Albania	10	(0)

Managerial career
- 2018–2019: Teuta Durrës(assistant)
- 2024–: Tirana (assistant)
- * Club domestic league appearances and goals as of 12 November 2017

Endri Vrapi (born 23 May 1982) is an Albanian retired footballer who last played as a defender for Kosovan club Liria.

== Club career ==
=== Early career ===
Vrapi began his career while still a teenager, playing for Partizani Tirana. Regarded as one of the best young Albanian talents at the time, he was also captain of the Albania under-19 team. He worked his way up through the ranks at Partizani Tirana and joined the first team during the 2001–02 season, though he did not feature in any league game that season. This prompted Vrapi to sign with Lushnja, a weaker team in the Albanian Superliga, to gain some experience.

At Lushnja he quickly established himself in the first team. He played seventy-six games and scored four goals for the club between 2002 and 2005. His impressive displays prompted one of the best teams in the country, Elbasani, to sign the left back in 2005. His most successful season came at Elbasani during his first spell there in the 2005–06 season. He played thirty-four games and scored two goals that season and was one reason Elbasani won the Albanian championship. After his triumph with Elbasani, in 2006 Vrapi moved to Teuta Durrës, where he almost repeated his success with Elbasani, when Teuta Durrës finished second behind KF Tirana in the Albanian Superliga. During the 2006–07 season he played twenty-nine games and scored two goals. After spending only one season in Durrës, Vrapi changed teams again, moving back to KF Tirana. This turned out to be a mistake. KF Tirana struggled all season, finishing a disappointing sixth place in the Albanian Superliga, the team's lowest league position in years. During that poor season Vrapi played twenty-seven games without scoring a goal. The Albanian international defender decided to go back and play where he had spent the best years of his career, Elbasani. He was greeted by his former team with open arms as they had paid a fee believed to be in the region of $140,000 for re-signing the left back.

=== Dinamo Tirana ===
On 30 June 2009, Vrapi signed a temporary deal with Dinamo Tirana for the club European campaign. He played entire match on 2 July 2009 in the Europa League first qualifying round against Lahti as Dinamo was defeated 4–1. He was replaced after 78 minutes in the returning leg as Dinamo managed to win 2–0 which was not enough as Lahti progressed 4–3 on aggregate.

=== Skënderbeu Korçë ===
On 30 June 2010, Vrapi was transferred to Skënderbeu Korçë, and was given the number 4 shirt for the 2010–11 season. He made his debut in team's opening match of 2010–11 season against his former team Besa Kavajë, but the match was suspended after 88th minute at 0–1 due to riots on the terraces. Skënderbeu was awarded by the FSHF 0–2. One week later, Vrapi played for the first time at Skënderbeu Stadium in a 2–0 defeat of Teuta Durrës.

=== Return to Tirana ===
On 29 August 2013, Vrapi left Skënderbeu after three seasons to return to Tirana by penning a one-year contract, taking squad number 44 for the upcoming season. He debuted in team's opening match of the 2013–14 season against KF Laçi, starting and playing the full 90 minutes in a goalless home draw. Vrapi, however, was one of the best players on the field.

In December, Tirana suffered a surprise elimination from Lushnja in the 2013–14 Albanian Cup second round, with Vrapi appearing in both legs unable to avoid the elimination. During the first part of the season, Tirana experienced its worst period of all time, winning 3 out of 16 league matches. Vrapi played in the back in 10 on these matches. Tirana also changed management three times, employing Nevil Dede, Alpin Gallo and later Gugash Magani. In December, the team was ranked in the last position with only 10 points from 13 matches, 7 points away from the safe zone.

However, with Magani in charge, Tirana changed completely the face by winning three of four matches of February, including the derby against Partizani Tirana thanks to the winner of Gilberto. Vrapi's first score-sheet contribution came later on 26 April by scoring in the 2–1 home win over fellow relegation strugglers Vllaznia Shkodër.

Tirana mathematically assured survival on 3 May 2014 in the penultimate week of the league after a 2–2 away draw against Flamurtari Vlorë, in a match where Vrapi played 90 minutes. His finished his season by making 26 marches, including 23 in league, netting once. He left the club as a free agent in mid-August after failing to find a way with club directors for the new contract.

=== Partizani Tirana ===
Vrapi completed a transfer to his first professional team Partizani Tirana on 1 September 2014 as a free agent, penning a one-year contract with an option of a further one. His presentation was made the same day, where he was given squad number 44 for 2014–15 season. His competitive debut occurred on 10 September in the matchday 3 against Skënderbeu Korçë, playing full-90 minutes in a 1–0.

During the first part of the season, Vrapi, alongside his defence partners Rrahmani, Fejzullahu and Cululi helped Hoxha to go 1,084 minutes without conceding a goal in Albanian Superliga to break the 30-year-old record set by the goalkeeper of KS Labinoti Elbasan (modern day called KF Elbasani), Bujar Gogunja, who kept intact net goal for 1037 minutes.

He concluded 2014–15 with 26 appearances, all in league, as Partizani finished 3rd in championship, returning in European competitions after seven years. During the season, Vrapi played mainly as left-back, but in several times he was used also as a centre-back.

Vrapi started the 2015–16 by playing full-90 minutes in the 1–3 away defeat at Strømsgodset in the 2015–16 UEFA Europa League first qualifying round. He also played full match in the returning leg by Partizani lost 0–1 at the last moments and was eventually eliminated 1–4 on aggregate.

On 13 January 2016, Partizani confirmed via their Facebook page that they have terminated the contract with Vrapi by mutual consensus.

=== Vllaznia Shkodër ===
Three days after becoming free agent, Vrapi agreed terms and joined Albanian Superliga strugglers Vllaznia Shkodër until the end of the season.

== International career ==
Vrapi has been an Albanian international for four years, collecting 10 appearances. He debuted with Albania on 1 March 2006, playing the last 11 minutes of the 2–1 home defeat against Lithuania.

== Career statistics ==
=== Clubs ===
As of 17 January 2016

Club	Season	League		Cup		Continental (Note: Including continental competitions, such as UEFA Champions League and UEFA Europa League)		Other (Note: Including other competitions, such as Albanian Supercup)		Total	
Club	Season	Apps	Goals	Apps	Goals	Apps	Goals	Apps	Goals	Apps	Goals
Partizani Tirana	2002–03	0	0	0	0	—		—		0	0
Lushnja	2002–03	29	0	0	0	—		—		29	0
Lushnja	2003–04	16	0	0	0	—		—		16	0
Lushnja	2004–05	31	4	0	0	—		—		31	4
Lushnja	Total	76	4	0	0	0	0	0	0	76	4
Elbasani	2005–06	34	2	0	0	1	0	—		35	2
Elbasani	2006–07	—		—		2	0	—		2	0
Teuta Durrës	2006–07	29	2	0	0	—		—		29	2
Teuta Durrës	2007–08	—		—		2	0	—		2	0
Teuta Durrës	Total	29	2	0	0	2	0	0	0	31	2
Tirana	2007–08	27	0	0	0	—		—		27	0
Elbasani	2008–09	31	2	0	0	—		—		31	2
Elbasani	Total	65	4	0	0	3	0	0	0	68	4
Dinamo Tirana	2009–10	—		—		2	0	—		2	0
Besa Kavajë	2009–10	28	0	0	0	2	0	—		30	0
Skënderbeu Korçë	2010–11	29	0	2	0	—		—		31	0
Skënderbeu Korçë	2011–12	18	0	9	0	2	0	1	0	30	0
Skënderbeu Korçë	2012–13	21	0	5	0	0	0	1	0	27	0
Skënderbeu Korçë	2013–14	—		—		1	0	1	0	2	0
Skënderbeu Korçë	Total	68	0	16	0	3	0	3	0	90	0
Tirana	2013–14	23	1	3	0	—		—		26	1
Tirana	Total	50	1	3	0	0	0	0	0	53	1
Partizani Tirana	2014–15	26	0	0	0	—		—		26	0
Partizani Tirana	2015–16	6	0	2	0	2	0	—		10	0
Partizani Tirana	Total	32	0	2	0	2	0	0	0	36	0
Vllaznia Shkodër	2015–16	0	0	0	0	—		—		0	0
Vllaznia Shkodër	Total	0	0	0	0	0	0	0	0	0	0
Career total		350	11	21	0	14	0	3	0	388	11

=== International ===
As of 21 October 2014

Albania national team
Year	Apps	Goals
2006	2	0
2007	0	0
2008	3	0
2009	2	0
2010	2	0
2011	1	0
Total	11	0

== Honours ==
=== Club ===
Elbasani

- Albanian Superliga: 2005–06

Besa

- Albanian Cup: 2009–10

Skënderbeu

- Albanian Superliga: 2010–11, 2011–12, 2012–13

=== Individual ===
- Albania Superliga Footballer of the Year: 2005–06
