= Florind Bardulla =

Albanian professional footballer

Personal information
- Date of birth: 19 November 1992 (age 33)
- Place of birth: Shkodër, Albania
- Height: 1.71 m (5 ft 7 in)
- Position: Right midfielder

Team information
- Current team: Besëlidhja Lezhë

Youth career
- 2007–2011: Vllaznia Shkodër

Senior career*
Years	Team	Apps	(Gls)
2011–2014	Vllaznia Shkodër	45	(0)
2014–2015	Teuta Durrës	6	(0)
2015–2021	Vllaznia Shkodër	103	(1)
2021–2023	Veleçiku		
2023–	Besëlidhja Lezhë		

International career
2010–2012	Albania U19	3	(0)
2013–2014	Albania U21	2	(0)
- * Club domestic league appearances and goals as of 21:39, 7 March 2021 (UTC)

Florind Bardulla (born 19 November 1992) is an Albanian professional footballer who plays as a midfielder for Besëlidhja Lezhë.

== Club career ==
A Vllaznia Shkodër product, Bardulla signed his first professional contract ahead of 2011–12 season. He made his competitive debut on 10 September 2011 in team's first match of the league against Laçi, featuring in the second half in a 3–1 convincing home win. Later that month, Bardulla made his first start for the team in another 3–1 home win, this time against his future side Teuta Durrës. He finished his first professional season by making 13 appearances, including 8 in league, only 4 as a starter, as Vllaznia didn't finish more than the 6th place. He also had a secondary role in team's Albanian Cup campaign which ended in the quarter-finals.

Bardulla found more space to play in the next season, however, he had to wait until February 2013 to make his first league appearance, featuring 62 minutes as Vllaznia caused an upset by beating Skënderbeu 1–0 in Korçë. He finished his second Vllaznia Shkodër season by making 13 league appearances, in addition to 2 cup matches, as the club finished the league again at the same position and were eliminated by Shkumbini Peqin in the second round of the Albanian Cup.

On 9 August 2017, Bardulla signed a new contract with Vllaznia until June 2019.
