= Bledar Vashaku =

Albanian footballer

Personal information
- Full name: Bledar Vashaku
- Date of birth: 8 November 1981 (age 45)
- Place of birth: Elbasan, Albania
- Height: 1.87 m (6 ft 2 in)
- Position: Goalkeeper

Senior career*
Years	Team	Apps	(Gls)
2001–2004	Naftëtari		
2004–2006	Apolonia		
2006–2007	Laçi		
2007–2008	Elbasani	0	(0)
2008–2010	Teuta	59	(0)
2010–2013	Besa	64	(0)
2013	Tirana	0	(0)
2014	Kamza	13	(0)
2014–2015	Tomori	23	(0)
2015	Partizani	0	(0)
2016	Turbina		
2016	Mamurrasi		
2017	Sopoti		
Medal record
KF Laçi
Winner	Albanian Cup	2012–13
- * Club domestic league appearances and goals as of 12 January 2016

Bledar Vashaku (born 8 November 1981 in Elbasan) is an Albanian retired footballer who played as a goalkeeper.

== Club career ==
=== Partizani Tirana ===
Vashaku joined Partizani Tirana in the Albanian Superliga on 25 August 2015, as backup to Albania international goalkeeper Alban Hoxha alongside Dashamir Xhika. He played his first and last match with the team on 16 September 2015, playing full-90 minutes in a 0–5 away win over Korabi Peshkopi, match valid for the first leg of the first round of Albanian Cup.

He left the club on 5 January 2016 after terminated his contract by mutual consensus.
