= Erion Sula =

Albanian footballer

Personal information
- Full name: Erion Sula
- Date of birth: 2 November 1986 (age 40)
- Place of birth: Lushnjë, Albania
- Position: Defender

Senior career*
Years	Team	Apps	(Gls)
2009	Kastrioti		
2010–2015	Lushnja	111	(1)
2015-2016	Shkumbini	5	(0)
2016	Tomori	8	(0)
- * Club domestic league appearances and goals as of 3 November 2019

Erion Sula (born 2 November 1986 in Lushnjë) is an Albanian footballer who most recently played as a defender for Tomori Berat in the Albanian First Division.
