= Arsen Hajdari =

Albanian footballer

Personal information
- Date of birth: 25 February 1989 (age 37)
- Place of birth: Shkodër, Albania
- Height: 1.76 m (5 ft 9 1/2 in)
- Positions: Midfielder; forward

Youth career
- 2002–2008: Vllaznia

Senior career*
Years	Team	Apps	(Gls)
2008–2011	Ada	46	(12)
2010	→ Drenica (loan)		
2011–2015	Vllaznia	85	(12)
2015–2016	Besëlidhja	27	(7)
2016–2019	Vllaznia	32	(7)
2017	→ Vllaznia B (loan)	16	(3)
2019–2021	Besëlidhja	30	(7)
2021–2023	Veleçiku		
- * Club domestic league appearances and goals as of 16 May 2021

Arsen Hajdari (born 25 February 1989) is an Albanian football player.
