= Erlind Koreshi =

Albanian footballer

Personal information
- Full name: Erlind Koreshi
- Date of birth: 9 February 1987 (age 39)
- Place of birth: Lushnje, Albania
- Height: 1.73 m (5 ft 8 in)
- Position: Centre midfielder

Team information
- Current team: Shkumbini
- Number: 18

Senior career*
Years	Team	Apps	(Gls)
2007–2008	Shkumbini	1	(0)
2008–2010	Lushnja	1	(0)
2010–2012	Bylis	47	(5)
2012–2014	Lushnja	44	(6)
2014	Tirana	13	(0)
2014–2015	Teuta	19	(0)
2015–2016	Kastrioti	30	(2)
2017–2018	Lushnja	13	(0)
2018–2018	Egnatia	12	(0)
2019–	Shkumbini	7	(0)
- * Club domestic league appearances and goals

Erlind Koreshi (born 9 February 1987) is an Albanian footballer who currently plays as a midfielder for Shkumbini in the Albanian First Division.
