= Okeljan Baze =

Albanian footballer

Personal information
- Date of birth: 24 April 1991 (age 35)
- Place of birth: Lushnjë, Albania
- Position: Midfielder

Youth career
- 2007–2008: Lushnja

Senior career*
Years	Team	Apps	(Gls)
2008–2009	Lushnja	5	(0)
2009–2011	Kamza	20	(2)
2011–2012	Pogradeci	20	(1)
2012–2013	Tërbuni	42	(3)
2014	Butrinti	13	(0)
2014–2017	Lushnja	62	(2)
2017–2018	Egnatia	21	(2)
2018–2020	Lushnja	48	(2)
- * Club domestic league appearances and goals

Okeljan Baze (born 24 April 1991) is an Albanian former footballer who played as a midfielder. Baze announced his retirement in August 2020.
