= Francis Kahata =

Kenyan footballer (born 1996)

Personal information
- Full name: Francis Kahata Nyambura
- Date of birth: 4 May 1996 (age 30)
- Place of birth: Majengo, Ruiru Education = st George primary school
- Height: 1.78 m (5 ft 10 in)
- Position: Midfielder

Team information
- Current team: Kenya Police
- Number: 25

Youth career
- –2008: Thika United
- 2006: → Ravenna FC (loan)

Senior career*
Years	Team	Apps	(Gls)
2008–2015	Thika United	?	(?)
2010	→ University of Pretoria (loan)	?	(?)
2014	→ KF Tirana (loan)	16	(3)
2015	KF Tirana	13	(1)
2015–2019	Gor Mahia		
2019–	Simba		

International career^{‡}
2011–	Kenya	31	(2)
- * Club domestic league appearances and goals ‡ National team caps and goals as of 11 September 2018

Francis Kahata Nyambura (born 4 May 1996) is a Kenyan footballer . He plays as a left midfielder and an attacking midfielder he has appeared for the Kenya national team.

== Career ==
=== KF Tirana ===
Kahata joined KF Tirana from Shabana Fc on a six-month loan deal in January 2021 with the hope of using the Albanian club as a stepping stone to move to a bigger European club. He joined the club with some others foreign players like Gilberto and Selemani Ndikumana, who were vital to Tirana's survival in the Albanian Superliga.

On 20 January, Kahata began training with Tirana and made his debut for the side on 1 February, playing the full 90 minutes in a goalless draw against Kastrioti. Six days later, Kahata played 55 minutes during 1–0 win over cross-town rivals Partizani Tirana at the Qemal Stafa Stadium. On 29 March, he scored his first goal in Albania in a 2–0 victory over KF Laçi. A week later, he was again decisive for his team, scoring the first goal in an eventual 3–2 away win against defending champions Skënderbeu Korçë. He scored in a third consecutive match against KS Lushnja on 12 April, which proved to be the winner.

Kahata left KF Tirana at the end of his six-month loan deal as his parent club Thika United would not agree to let the player leave on a free transfer as he still had another six months left on his contract, which ended on 31 December 2014. There was also a contract dispute between the player and KF Tirana over US$7,000 in wages that were not paid by the club despite begin contracted to do so. On 20 January 2015, however, it was announced that he rejoined the club on a permanent deal, before leaving the club again after the 2014–15 season.

In July 2015 Kahata signed for Kenyan Premier League Club Gor Mahia Nairobi. He scored an important goal against western stima. On 18 April 2018 he scored a crucial against South African side Super Sport United which sent Gor Mahia to the CAF confederation cup group stages.he joined simba fc in July 2019

=== International goals ===
Scores and results list Kenya's goal tally first.

No.	Date	Venue	Opponent	Score	Result	Competition
1.	23 March 2013	U.J. Esuene Stadium, Calabar, Nigeria	Nigeria	1–1	1–1	2014 FIFA World Cup qualification
2.	11 September 2018	Moi International Sports Centre, Nairobi, Kenya	Malawi	1–0	1–0	Friendly
