= Darjo Xhuti =

Albanian footballer

Personal information
- Full name: Darjo Xhuti
- Date of birth: 9 May 1991 (age 35)
- Place of birth: Korçë, Albania
- Height: 1.80 m (5 ft 11 in)
- Position: Midfielder

Senior career*
Years	Team	Apps	(Gls)
2013	Tirana	1	(0)
- * Club domestic league appearances and goals as of 10 May 2013

Darjo Xhuti (born 9 May 1991) is an Albanian professional footballer who plays as a midfielder.

== Club career ==
Xhuti initially came on trial at Albanian Superliga side Tirana at the end of 2012. He also scored in a friendly against Vllaznia Shkodër which ended 2–0 his side. He successfully passed the trial, and on 30 January 2013, Xhuti was presented as the new player of Tirana, signing a contract until the end of the season. He was given squad number 22. Xhuti made his first Tirana appearance by appearing in the last minutes of the goalless away draw against Laçi in the final championship round. That was his only appearance of the season, as Tirana finished the championship in 5th place. Xhuti left the club on 1 June after his contract run out.

== Personal life ==
Xhuti emigrated to Greece along with his family at a very young age.

== Career statistics ==
=== Club ===
As of 10 May 2013

Club statistics
Club	Season	League			Cup		Europe		Other		Total	
Club	Season	Division	Apps	Goals	Apps	Goals	Apps	Goals	Apps	Goals	Apps	Goals
Tirana	2012–13	Albanian Superliga	1	0	0	0	—		—		1	0
Career total			1	0	0	0	—		—		1	0
