= Ndriçim Babasi =

Albanian politician

Member of the Albanian parliament
- In office 2011 – June 2013

Personal details
- Political party: Democratic Party

Ndriçim Babasi was a member of the Assembly of the Republic of Albania for the Democratic Party of Albania. He joined the assembly following local elections in 2011.

From 27 August 2013, Ndriçim Babasi has been appointed president of Albanian football club, KF Tirana. Now is not.
