= Kehinde Owoeye =

Nigerian footballer

Personal information
- Full name: Kehinde Amoo Owoeye
- Date of birth: 31 July 1995 (age 31)
- Place of birth: Nigeria
- Height: 1.78 m (5 ft 10 in)
- Position: Defensive midfielder

Team information
- Current team: Binatlı YSK
- Number: 88

Senior career*
Years	Team	Apps	(Gls)
2012	BCC Lions FC		
2012–2013	Bylis Ballsh	16	(0)
2012–2013	→ Tomori (loan)	22	(2)
2014	KF Laçi	14	(2)
2014	Kastrioti Krujë	11	(1)
2015–2016	Kastrioti Krujë	0	(1)
2016–	Binatlı YSK	31	(1)
- * Club domestic league appearances and goals

Kehinde Amoo Owoeye (born 31 July 1995) is a Nigerian footballer who currently plays as a defensive midfielder for Binatlı YSK in the KTFF Süper Lig.

== Career ==
=== Kastrioti Krujë ===
Kehinde returned to Kastrioti Krujë in July 2015 ahead of the 2015–16 Albanian First Division campaign on a one-year deal.
