= Hanc Llagami =

Albanian footballer

Personal information
- Full name: Hanc Llagami
- Date of birth: 1 June 1995 (age 31)
- Place of birth: Tirana, Albania
- Height: 1.83 m (6 ft 0 in)
- Position: Right midfielder

Youth career
- 2010–2014: Tirana

Senior career*
Years	Team	Apps	(Gls)
2013–2015	Tirana	2	(0)
2015–2016	Dinamo Tirana		(0)
- * Club domestic league appearances and goals

Hanc Llagami (born 1 June 1995 in Tirana) is an Albanian professional footballer who most recently played for Dinamo Tirana in the Albanian First Division.
