= Xhino Sejdo =

Albanian footballer and singer

Personal information
- Date of birth: 30 April 1991 (age 35)
- Place of birth: Tirana, Albania
- Height: 1.87 m (6 ft 2 in)
- Position: Goalkeeper

Youth career
- 2007–2008: AS Roma
- 2009–2011: SSC Venezia

Senior career*
Years	Team	Apps	(Gls)
2009–2011	Partizani	24	(0)
2011–2012	Shkumbini	19	(0)
2012–2015	Tirana	36	(0)

International career
2007–2008	Albania U17	4	(0)
2008	Albania U19	3	(0)
- * Club domestic league appearances and goals

Xhino Sejdo (born 30 April 1991) was an Albanian footballer. Now known as a businessman.

== Club career ==
He has played as a goalkeeper for KF Tirana.

=== Fireworks incident ===
On 25 March 2014 whilst Sejdo was training with KF Tirana at the Skënder Halili centre, fireworks were placed on his car which created a small explosion. Nobody was injured in the incident and the culprits were never found, and the police believing the incident to be unprovoked rather than a revenge attack on the player.
