= Mensur Limani =

Kosovar Albanian footballer

Personal information
- Full name: Mensur Limani
- Date of birth: 5 December 1985 (age 40)
- Place of birth: Bujanovac, SFR Yugoslavia
- Height: 1.81 m (5 ft 11 in)
- Position: Attacking midfielder

Youth career
- 1995–2000: Tërnoci
- 2000–2004: Drita

Senior career*
Years	Team	Apps	(Gls)
2004–2006	Drita	30	(2)
2006–2007	Bashkimi	25	(5)
2007–2008	Milano Kumanovë	15	(4)
2008–2009	Prishtina	20	(3)
2009–2011	Drenica	22	(1)
2011–2012	AZAL	23	(1)
2012–2014	Tirana	41	(4)
2014–2015	Drita	23	(4)
Total		199	(24)

International career
2005	Kosovo	1	(0)
- * Club domestic league appearances and goals

Mensur Limani^{[a]} (born 4 December 1985) is a Kosovar Albanian footballer. He played internationally for Kosovo national football team and most recently played for the Kosovan club Drita.

== Early life ==
Limani was born in Bujanovac, at the time SR Serbia, SFR Yugoslavia.

== International career ==
Limani was part of the Kosovo team that played at the 2005 Northern Cyprus National Games tournament.

== Club statistics (incomplete) ==
As of 4 December 2012

Club performance			League		Cup		League Cup		Continental		Total	
Season	Club	League	Apps	Goals	Apps	Goals	Apps	Goals	Apps	Goals	Apps	Goals
Azerbaijan			League		Azerbaijan Cup		League Cup		Europe		Total	
2010–11	AZAL	Azerbaijan Premier League	9	1	3	0	—		—		12	1
2011–12	AZAL	Azerbaijan Premier League	14	0	1	0	—		2	0	17	0
Albania			League		Albanian Cup		League Cup		Europe		Total	
2012–13	KF Tirana	Albanian Superliga	22	0	3	0	—		—		15	0
Total	Azerbaijan		23	1	4	0	—		2	0	29	1
Total	Albania		12	0	3	0	—		—		15	0
Career total			35	1	7	0	—		2	0	44	1

== Honours ==
=== Club ===
- Albanian Supercup
  - Winner: 1 – 2012 with KF Tirana
  - Winner:1

2004 with Kf Drita

== Notes ==
a.	Albanian: Mensur Limani, Serbian Cyrillic: Менсур Лимани.
