= Mauro De Vecchis =

Italian football coach

Personal information
- Full name: Mauro De Vecchis
- Date of birth: 20 October 1967 (age 59)
- Place of birth: Italy

Managerial career
- Years: Team
- 1991–1997: Lazio (youth)
- 1997–1998: Selargius
- 1998–1999: Calangianus
- 2000–2001: Allumiere
- Torrinsabina
- Nepi
- 2005–2006: Papua New Guinea
- 2009–2010: Comunale Dil. Foglianese
- 2011: Real Rimini
- 2011–2012: Ostiantica
- 2012–2013: Kamza
- 2015: Bylis Ballsh

Mauro De Vecchis (born 20 October 1967) is an Italian football coach who has spent the majority of his career in Italy, with stints in Albania and Papua New Guinea.
