= Artan Sakaj =

Albanian footballer and manager

Personal information
- Full name: Artan Sakaj
- Date of birth: 8 December 1980 (age 45)
- Place of birth: Vlorë, Albania
- Position: Defender

Youth career
- 1995–1998: Flamurtari

Senior career*
Years	Team	Apps	(Gls)
1998–2004	Flamurtari	105	(2)
2004–2005	Teuta	30	(0)
2005–2007	Flamurtari	42	(3)
2007–2008	Elbasani	12	(0)
2008–2009	Besa	30	(2)
2009–2012	Flamurtari	80	(6)
2012–2013	Teuta	24	(1)
2013–2014	Flamurtari	10	(0)

Managerial career
- 2017–2019: Oriku
- 2021: Oriku
- * Club domestic league appearances and goals as of 1 March 2014

Artan Sakaj (born 8 December 1980) is an Albanian football manager and retired player.

== Playing career ==
=== Club ===
Sakaj began his playing career with his home town club, KS Flamurtari Vlorë, before moving to clubs outside of Vlorë, including KS Elbasani. He joined Besa in June 2008, appearing for the club in the UEFA Intertoto Cup 2008 as they advanced to the second round before losing to Grasshopper Club Zürich. In summer 2009 Sakaj returned to Flamurtari, where he is captain of the team.
