= 2011–12 Kategoria Superiore =

Kategoria Superiore
- Season: 2011–12
- Dates: 10 September 2011 – 12 May 2012
- Champions: Skënderbeu; 3rd Albanian title
- Relegated: Kamza (via play-off); Pogradeci; Dinamo
- Champions League: Skënderbeu
- Europa League: Teuta; Tirana; Flamurtari
- Matches: 108
- Goals: 274 (2.54 per match)
- Top goalscorer: Roland Dervishi (20 goals)
- Biggest home win: Flamurtari 5–0 Shkumbini
- Biggest away win: Apolonia 1–5 Skënderbeu
- Highest scoring: Shkumbini 6–2 Tomori

The 2011–12 Kategoria Superiore was the 73rd official season, or 76th season of top-tier football in Albania (including three unofficial championships of WW2) and the fourteenth season under the name Kategoria superiore. The season began on 10 September 2011 and ended on 12 May 2012. The defending champions were Skënderbeu, who won their second Albanian league championship last season and third in their history.

The size of the league was expanded from twelve to fourteen teams this season.

== Teams ==
Besa and Elbasani finished the 2010–11 season in 11th and 12th place and were relegated to the Kategoria e Parë. Taking their places were the champions of the 2010–11 Kategoria e Parë competition, Pogradeci, and the runners-up, Tomori.

In addition, because the league expanded to 14 clubs this season, the third- and fourth-placed clubs of last season's Kategoria e Parë were also promoted to this competition automatically. These clubs were Kamza and Apolonia.

Finally, two more spots in this competition were available via a promotion-relegation playoff between the 9th and 10th-place finishers of last season's Kategoria Superiore, Shkumbini Peqin and Dinamo Tirana, and the 5th and 6th-place finishers of last season's Kategoria e Parë, Besëlidhja Lezhë and Adriatiku Mamurras. Shkumbini defeated Adriatiku 1–0 after extra time and Dinamo Tirana defeated Besëlidhja 4–1, so both Superiore teams retained their spots in the league for this season.

=== Stadia and last season ===
Locations of the 2011–12 Kategoria Superiore teams

Team	Location	Stadium	Capacity	Last season
Apolonia	Fier	Loni Papuçiu Stadium	12,000	Kategoria e Parë
Bylis	Ballsh	Adush Muça Stadium	9,500	6th
Dinamo	Tirana	Selman Stërmasi Stadium	12,500	10th
Flamurtari	Vlorë	Flamurtari Stadium	13,000	2nd
Kamza	Kamëz	Kamëz Stadium	5,000	Kategoria e Parë
Kastrioti	Krujë	Kastrioti Stadium	10,000	8th
Laçi	Laç	Laçi Stadium	5,000	4th
Pogradeci	Pogradec	Gjorgji Kyçyku Stadium	8,000	Kategoria e Parë
Skënderbeu	Korçë	Skënderbeu Stadium	12,000	Champions
Shkumbini	Peqin	Shkumbini Stadium	5,000	9th
Teuta	Durrës	Niko Dovana Stadium	13,000	7th
Tirana	Tirana	Selman Stërmasi Stadium	12,500	5th
Tomori	Berat	Tomori Stadium	14,500	Kategoria e Parë
Vllaznia	Shkodër	Loro Boriçi Stadium	16,000	3rd

=== Personnel and sponsoring ===
Team	Head coach	Captain	Kit manufacturer	Shirt sponsor
Apolonia	(Albania) Dhimitër Papuçiu			
Bylis	(Turkey) Naci Şensoy			
Dinamo Tirana	(Albania) Artan Mërgjyshi			
Flamurtari	(Albania) Shkëlqim Muça	(Albania) Artan Sakaj	Legea	Brunes Hidrosanitare
Kamza	(Italy) Mauro De Vecchis			
Kastrioti	(Albania) Ramadan Ndreu	(Albania) Fatmir Caca	Adidas	
Laçi	(Albania) Nevil Dede	(Albania) Sajmir Kastrati	Sportika	Top Sport
Pogradeci	(Albania) Ylli Çekiçi			
Skënderbeu	(Czech Republic) Stanislav Levy	(Albania) Bledi Shkëmbi	Legea	Ama Cafè
Shkumbini	(Albania) Kristaq Mile			
Teuta	(Albania) Hasan Lika	(Albania) Arian Sheta	Legea	
Tirana	(Spain) Julián Rubio	(Albania) Elvis Sina	Legea	BPP Group
Tomori	(Albania) Ernest Gjoka			
Vllaznia	(Albania) Rudi Vata	(Albania) Dritan Smajlaj	Legea	Hotel Colosseo

=== Managerial changes ===
Team	Outgoing manager	Manner of departure	Date of vacancy	Position in table	Replaced by	Date of appointment
KF Tirana	(Croatia) Mišo Krstičević	Sacked	19-05-2011	Pre season	(Spain) Julián Rubio	20-06-2011
Vllaznia Shkodër	(Albania) Mirel Josa	Sacked	31-10-2011	6.	(Albania) Rudi Vata	3-11-2011
Skënderbeu Korçë	(Albania) Shpetim Duro	Sacked	4-10-2011	7.	(Czech Republic) Stanislav Levy	10-10-2011

== League table ==
Pos	Team	Pld	W	D	L	GF	GA	GD	Pts	Qualification or relegation
1	Skënderbeu (C)	26	17	6	3	45	16	+29	57	Qualification for the Champions League second qualifying round
2	Teuta	26	17	5	4	33	18	+15	56	Qualification for the Europa League first qualifying round (Note: Tirana qualified for the Europa League first qualifying round by winning the 2011–12 Albanian Cup. Since they finished third in the league, the fourth-placed team of the league also qualified for the Europa League.)
3	Tirana	26	16	5	5	33	21	+12	53	Qualification for the Europa League first qualifying round
4	Flamurtari	26	13	7	6	42	20	+22	46	Qualification for the Europa League first qualifying round
5	Kastrioti	26	11	5	10	37	30	+7	38	
6	Bylis	26	9	8	9	40	37	+3	35 (Note: Bylis ahead of Vllaznia on head-to-head record; Bylis–Vllaznia 1–0, Vllaznia–Bylis 3–3.)	
7	Vllaznia	26	10	5	11	39	33	+6	35	
8	Laçi (Note: Laçi were deducted six points for crowd trouble.)	26	11	7	8	26	28	−2	34	
9	Shkumbini	26	8	7	11	37	45	−8	31	
10	Tomori (O)	26	8	4	14	36	47	−11	28	Qualification for the relegation play-offs
11	Kamza (R)	26	7	6	13	22	32	−10	27	Qualification for the relegation play-offs
12	Apolonia (O)	26	5	6	15	27	46	−19	21	Qualification for the relegation play-offs
13	Pogradeci (Note: Pogradeci were deducted three points for crowd trouble.) (R)	26	6	4	16	25	47	−22	19	Relegation to the 2012–13 Kategoria e Parë
14	Dinamo Tirana (Note: Dinamo Tirana were deducted three points for not paying Dario Bodrušić.) (R)	26	3	7	16	19	41	−22	13	Relegation to the 2012–13 Kategoria e Parë

Source: Albanian Football Association (in Albanian), Soccerway
Rules for classification: 1) points; 2) points in head-to-head matches; 3) goal difference in head-to-head matches; 4) goals scored in head-to-head matches; 5) total goal difference; 6) total goals scored; 7) draw
(C) Champions; (O) Play-off winners; (R) Relegated

== Results ==
Home \ Away	APO	BYL	DIN	FLA	KAM	KAS	LAÇ	POG	SKË	SKU	TEU	TIR	TOM	VLL
Apolonia		2–1	2–0	1–3	0–0	1–0	1–1	2–3	1–5	1–1	0–1	1–2	6–5	1–4
Bylis	2–1		3–1	1–3	2–1	0–1	3–0	1–0	0–0	5–2	0–0	1–0	4–2	1–0
Dinamo	3–3	1–1		1–1	0–2	0–1	2–2	1–0	0–0	0–0	0–1	3–2	4–1	0–3
Flamurtari	1–1	2–0	5–0		2–1	3–1	0–0	2–0	1–0	5–0	1–1	0–1	1–1	1–0
Kamza	0–1	1–0	1–1	0–1		1–1	3–1	2–1	0–1	1–0	1–2	0–0	2–1	1–0
Kastrioti	2–0	4–2	1–0	1–1	3–2		0–1	4–0	1–2	0–1	1–2	2–3	3–1	2–1
Laçi	1–0	2–2	1–0	0–0	1–0	1–1		2–0	2–1	3–2	1–0	0–1	2–0	1–0
Pogradeci	1–1	1–1	1–0	0–2	2–1	1–1	3–1		1–3	0–0	1–2	1–2	1–0	2–1
Skënderbeu	2–0	3–2	2–0	2–1	0–0	1–0	3–0	3–0		3–1	0–1	2–0	0–0	2–1
Shkumbini	2–0	1–1	1–0	0–3	3–1	0–1	1–1	2–1	2–4		1–2	3–2	6–2	2–1
Teuta	2–1	1–0	2–0	1–0	0–0	1–1	1–0	5–3	0–0	2–1		1–2	1–0	0–1
Tirana	1–0	3–2	1–0	2–0	1–0	1–0	1–0	3–1	0–0	1–1	0–1		1–0	0–0
Tomori	2–0	2–2	2–1	3–2	4–1	2–1	0–1	4–1	2–4	1–0	0–2	0–1		1–0
Vllaznia	1–0	3–3	2–1	2–1	4–0	2–4	3–1	1–0	0–2	4–4	3–1	0–0	2–2	

Source: Albanian Football Association
Legend: Blue = home team win; Yellow = draw; Red = away team win.

=== Positions by round ===
Team ╲ Round	1	2	3	4	5	6	7	8	9	10	11	12	13	14	15	16	17	18	19	20	21	22	23	24	25	26
Skënderbeu	7	11	6	11	10	9	7	8	7	4	3	3	3	3	3	2	2	1	1	1	1	2	1	1	1	1
Teuta	6	1	2	1	1	1	1	1	1	1	1	1	1	1	2	3	3	3	3	3	2	1	2	2	2	2
Tirana	10	5	4	2	2	2	2	2	3	2	2	2	2	2	1	1	1	2	2	2	3	3	3	3	3	3
Flamurtari	5	6	5	6	3	3	3	3	4	5	5	5	5	4	4	4	5	5	5	4	4	4	4	4	4	4
Kastrioti	1	3	9	5	4	4	4	4	2	3	4	4	4	5	5	5	4	4	4	5	5	5	5	5	5	5
Bylis	2	2	1	3	6	8	10	11	9	6	10	7	6	6	6	7	6	7	7	7	6	7	6	7	9	6
Vllaznia	3	8	3	8	8	11	8	7	6	8	9	6	8	8	8	6	7	6	6	6	8	6	7	8	6	7
Laçi	11	13	13	10	5	5	5	6	5	7	6	11	11	10	10	9	10	9	9	9	9	9	8	6	7	8
Shkumbini	13	4	11	7	7	6	9	10	11	11	8	9	7	7	7	8	8	8	8	8	7	8	9	9	8	9
Tomori	7	12	8	12	13	13	13	13	13	13	13	13	12	12	11	12	11	11	10	10	10	10	10	10	10	10
Kamza	9	7	10	13	12	7	6	5	8	9	11	10	9	11	12	10	9	10	11	11	11	11	11	11	11	11
Apolonia	4	9	7	4	9	12	11	12	12	12	12	12	13	13	13	13	13	13	13	13	13	13	13	13	13	12
Pogradeci	14	10	12	9	11	10	12	9	10	10	7	8	10	9	9	11	12	12	12	12	12	12	12	12	12	13
Dinamo	12	14	14	14	14	14	14	14	14	14	14	14	14	14	14	14	14	14	14	14	14	14	14	14	14	14

Leader and UEFA Champions League second qualifying round
UEFA Europa League first qualifying round
Relegation play-off
2012–13 Kategoria e Parë

Source: Soccerway.com

== Relegation playoffs ==
The 10th-, 11th- and 12th-placed Superliga teams competed against the third-, fourth- and fifth-placed First Division sides in single match relegation playoffs.

18 May 2012
16:30

Kamza	0–2	Besa
	Report	Rroshi 18'; Mihani 75'

Skënderbeu Stadium, Korçë
Attendance: 1,500
Referee: Laver Alla

19 May 2012
16:30

Tomori	0–0	Besëlidhja
	Report
Penalties
	3–2

Qemal Stafa Stadium, Tirana
Attendance: 2,500
Referee: Emirjon Simo

20 May 2012
16:30

Apolonia	3–0	Lushnja
Ribaj 27', 70'; Gerxho 85'	Report

Niko Dovana Stadium, Durrës
Attendance: 5,000
Referee: Lorenc Jemini

== Top scorers ==
Rank	Player	Club	Goals
1	(Albania) Ronald Dervishi	Shkumbini	20
2	(Albania) Endri Bakiu	Tomori	19
3	(France) Bruce Inkango	Kastrioti	14
4	(Albania) Bekim Balaj	Tirana	13
5	(Albania) Daniel Xhafaj	Skënderbeu	11
6	(Albania) Vilfor Hysa	Laçi	10
