= Fatmir Caca =

Albanian retired footballer

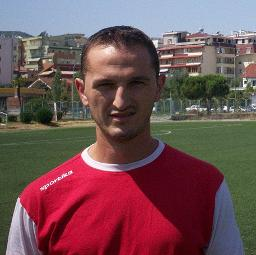
- Fatmir Caca

Personal information
- Full name: Fatmir Caca
- Date of birth: 28 May 1985 (age 41)
- Place of birth: Krujë, Albania
- Position: Defender

Youth career
- 2000–2003: Kastrioti

Senior career*
Years	Team	Apps	(Gls)
2003–2009	Kastrioti	52	(2)
2009–2010	Teuta	8	(0)
2010–2014	Kastrioti	114	(1)
2015	Iliaria	10	(0)
2015–2016	Kamza	11	(0)
Total		195	(3)
- * Club domestic league appearances and goals as of 2 February 2019

Fatmir Caca (born 28 May 1985) is an Albanian retired footballer who played the majority of his career for Albanian Superliga side Kastrioti Krujë as a defender, where he was also the team captain.

== Honours ==
Kastrioti Krujë

- Albanian Superliga Playoffs (1): 2009
