= Sajmir Kastrati =

Albanian footballer

Saimir Kastrati
Personal information
- Date of birth: 7 March 1987 (age 39)
- Place of birth: Laç, Albania
- Position: Defender

Senior career*
Years	Team	Apps	(Gls)
2006–2014	Laçi	130+	(7+)
2014–2015	Adriatiku	23	(2)
2015–2017	Besëlidhja	33	(1)
- * Club domestic league appearances and goals as of 6 May 2019

Saimir Kastrati (born 7 March 1987 in Laç) now a PE teacher in the school “Besnik Syla”, mamurras is an Albanian football player who most recently plays for Besëlidhja Lezhë in the Albanian First Division.
