= Daniel Rroshi =

Albanian footballer

Personal information
- Date of birth: 24 April 1988 (age 38)
- Place of birth: Kavajë, Albania
- Position: Midfielder

Senior career*
Years	Team	Apps	(Gls)
-2011	Turbina		
2011-2014	Besa	42	(4)
- * Club domestic league appearances and goals

Daniel Rroshi (born 24 April 1988) is an Albanian football player who most recently played as a midfielder for Besa Kavajë football club.
