= Herby Fortunat =

Congolese footballer (born 1982)

Personal information
- Date of birth: 28 June 1982 (age 44)
- Place of birth: Port-au-Prince, Haiti
- Height: 1.80 m (5 ft 11 in)
- Position: Forward

Senior career*
Years	Team	Apps	(Gls)
2000–2001	Sochaux B	0	(0)
2001–2002	CO Châlons		
2002–2003	US Joué-lès-Tours		
2003–2004	FC Bulle	12	(2)
2004–2005	YF Juventus	15	(4)
2005–2006	Besa Kavajë	27	(10)
2006–2007	Entente SSG	21	(3)
2007–2008	Besa Kavajë	10	(0)
2008	Gamlakarleby BK	0	(0)
2008–2008	Besa Kavajë	43	(13)
2011–2012	Can Tho	0	(0)
2013	KF Tirana	3	(0)

International career
	France U16	2	(0)
2006	Congo	3	(0)
- * Club domestic league appearances and goals

Herby Fortunat (born 28 June 1982) is a Congolese former professional footballer who played as a forward.

== Club career ==
Born in Port-au-Prince, Haiti, Fortunat was raised in France. He began his professional career with FC Sochaux-Montbéliard at age 18, but never played for the club's first team. He would play in the Championnat de France amateur and Swiss Challenge League before signing with Albanian Superliga side Besa Kavajë in 2005. After scoring ten goals for Besa, he signed with Championnat National side L'Entente SSG in July 2006.

On 29 January 2013, Fortunat signed with KF Tirana for an undisclosed fee. He was presented to the media in the next day.

== International career ==
Fortunat played twice for the France U16 national team before opting to play for the senior Congo national team in 2006. He made three appearances for Congo-Brazzaville.
