= Fatjon Topi =

Albanian footballer

Personal information
- Full name: Fatjon Topi
- Date of birth: 24 December 1982 (age 43)
- Place of birth: Lushnjë, Albania
- Positions: Defender; midfielder

Youth career
- –2003: KS Lushnja

Senior career*
| Years | Team | Apps | (Gls) |
| 2003–2010 | Lushnja | 53+ | (2) |
| 2003–2004 | → Çlirimi (loan) | | |
| 2010–2011 | Tomori | 22 | (2) |
| 2011–2015 | Lushnja | 92 | (5) |
| 2016–2017 | Tomori | 16 | (1) |
| 2019 | Osumi | | |
- * Club domestic league appearances and goals

Fatjon Topi (born 24 December 1982) is an Albanian footballer who most recently played as a defender for KF Osumi in the Albanian Second Division.
