= Alpin Gallo =

Albanian footballer

Personal information
- Full name: Alpin Gallo
- Date of birth: 12 January 1974 (age 52)
- Place of birth: Librazhd, Albania
- Height: 1.83 m (6 ft 0 in)
- Position: Defender

Senior career*
Years	Team	Apps	(Gls)
1992–1993	Sopoti	20	(5)
1993–1997	Tirana	90	(7)
1997–1998	FC Thun	0	(0)
1998	Skënderbeu	1	(0)
1999	Tirana	9	(0)
2000	Bylis	11	(0)
2001–2004	Dinamo	91	(4)
2005–2006	Partizani	50	(0)
2006–2008	Kastrioti	61	(0)
2008–2009	Shkumbini	16	(0)

International career
1994–1998	Albania	9	(0)

Managerial career
- 2013: Tirana
- 2016: Turbina
- 2016: Sopoti
- 2021–: Tirana W
- * Club domestic league appearances and goals

Alpin Gallo (born 12 January 1974 in Librazhd, Albania) is an Albanian retired football defender. He last played for KS Shkumbini Peqin in the 2008/2009 Albanian Superliga season. He is also a former Albanian international, having earned 9 caps from 1994 through 1998.

== International career ==
Gallo made his debut for Albania in a May 1994 friendly match against Macedonia and earned a total of 9 caps, scoring no goals. His final international was a September 1998 European Championship qualification match against Georgia.

=== National team statistics ===
Albania national team
Year	Apps	Goals
1994	1	0
1995	1	0
1996	0	0
1997	3	0
1998	4	0
Total	9	0

== Managerial career ==
Gallo resigned from his post as head coach of Tirana in November 2013. In February 2016, he succeeded Luan Metani as manager of Turbina Cerrik.

== Honours ==
- Albanian Superliga: 6

1995, 1996, 1997, 1999, 2000, 2002
