= 2013–14 FK Partizani Tirana season =

Partizani Tirana
2013–14 season
- President: Gazmend Demi
- Head coach: Hasan Lika (until 8 February 2014); Márcio Sampaio (from 9 February to 6 May 2014); Genc Tomorri (interim) (from 6 May 2014)
- Stadium: Qemal Stafa Stadium
- Kategoria Superiore: 5th
- Albanian Cup: Second round
- Top goalscorer: League: Migen Memelli; Nderim Nexhipi (6); All: Migen Memelli; Nderim Nexhipi (6)
- Highest home attendance: 10,000 vs Tirana (22 March 2014)
- Lowest home attendance: 150 vs Ada Velipojë (6 November 2013)
Home colours	Away colours

In the 2013–14 season, Partizani Tirana competed in the Kategoria Superiore after it returned from the Kategoria e Parë to the top flight after four seasons of absence.

== First-team squad ==
Squad at end of season

Note: Flags indicate national team as defined under FIFA eligibility rules; some limited exceptions apply. Players may hold more than one non-FIFA nationality.

No.	Pos.	Nation	Player
1	GK	ALB	Sulejman Hoxha
2	DF	KOS	Besnik Krasniqi
3	DF	ALB	Elvis Prençi
4	MF	MKD	Ertan Demiri
5	DF	ALB	Gezim Krasniqi
6	DF	NGR	Felix Udoh
7	FW	CRO	Mario Sačer
8	MF	KOS	Behar Maliqi
10	MF	CRO	Antun Dunković
11	MF	ALB	Emiljano Musta
12	GK	ALB	Alban Hoxha (Captain)
14	MF	KOS	Mentor Mazrekaj

No.	Pos.	Nation	Player
16	FW	BIH	Almir Pliska
16	DF	MKD	Mevlan Murati
17	MF	ALB	Fatmir Hysenbelliu
18	DF	ALB	Amir Rrahmani
19	DF	KOS	Liridon Ahmeti
20	MF	SRB	Dragan Antanasijević
21	MF	ALB	Renato Hyshmeri
22	DF	KOS	Labinot Ibrahimi
23	MF	MKD	Nderim Nexhipi
25	GK	ALB	Fabio Gjonika
73	FW	ALB	Rigers Dushku
—	MF	NGR	Oshobe Oladele

=== Left club during season ===
Note: Flags indicate national team as defined under FIFA eligibility rules; some limited exceptions apply. Players may hold more than one non-FIFA nationality.

No.	Pos.	Nation	Player
7	FW	ALB	Julian Malo (to Laçi)
9	FW	ALB	Aldo Mitraj (to Apolonia)
15	MF	ALB	Jozef Thana (to Laçi)
17	FW	SRB	Vladimir Buač (retired)

No.	Pos.	Nation	Player
23	FW	SLO	Patrik Bordon (to Bylis)
27	FW	ALB	Salvador Sulçe (to Dinamo Tirana)
55	FW	ALB	Endri Lala (to Adriatiku)
—	FW	NGR	Onome Sodje (released)

== Competitions ==
=== Kategoria Superiore ===
==== League table ====
Pos	Team	Pld	W	D	L	GF	GA	GD	Pts	Qualification or relegation
3	Laçi	33	16	6	11	41	28	+13	54	Qualification for the Europa League first qualifying round
4	Teuta	33	14	12	7	46	35	+11	54	
5	Partizani	33	15	8	10	33	26	+7	53	
6	Tirana	33	14	8	11	36	31	+5	50	
7	Flamurtari (Note: Flamurtari were deducted three points.)	33	14	9	10	45	40	+5	48	Qualification for the Europa League first qualifying round

Source: Albanian Football Association (in Albanian), Soccerway
Rules for classification: 1) points; 2) points in head-to-head matches; 3) goal difference in head-to-head matches; 4) goals scored in head-to-head matches; 5) total goal difference; 6) total goals scored; 7) draw

==== Results summary ====
Overall								Home						Away					
Pld	W	D	L	GF	GA	GD	Pts	W	D	L	GF	GA	GD	W	D	L	GF	GA	GD
33	15	8	10	33	26	+7	53	10	5	2	21	8	+13	5	3	8	12	18	−6

Source: Competitive matches

==== Results by round ====
Round	1	2	3	4	5	6	7	8	9	10	11	12	13	14	15	16	17	18	19	20	21	22	23	24	25	26	27	28	29	30	31	32	33
Ground	A	A	H	A	H	A	H	A	H	A	H	H	H	A	H	A	H	A	H	A	H	A	H	A	H	A	H	A	H	H	A	H	A
Result	W	L	D	W	D	W	W	L	L	L	W	W	W	L	W	L	D	L	W	D	D	D	W	W	D	D	W	L	W	W	L	L	W
Position	1	6	4	3	4	3	3	3	4	5	4	3	2	2	2	2	3	4	2	3	3	3	3	3	2	3	3	3	3	2	3	5	5

Source: Competitive matches
A = Away; H = Home; W = Win; D = Draw; L = Loss

==== Matches ====
31 August 2013 1	Kastrioti Krujë	0–2	Partizani Tirana	Krujë
17:00 CEST	Daja (yellow card) 29'; Xhafa (yellow card) 58'; Alechenwu (yellow card) 85'	Report	Hyshmeri 24'; Maliqi (yellow card) 32' (yellow-red card) 79'; Demiri 51'; Udoh (yellow card) 53'; Mitraj (yellow card) 66'	Stadium: Kastrioti Stadium; Attendance: 2,000; Referee: Enea Jorgji

14 September 2013 2	Laçi	1–0	Partizani Tirana	Laç
14:00 CEST	Sefgjinaj (yellow card) 22'; Veliaj (yellow card) 25'; Tanushaj 73'	Report	Oladele (yellow card) 59'; Ibrahimi (yellow card) 67'; B. Krasniqi (yellow card) 80'	Stadium: Laçi Stadium; Attendance: 2,000; Referee: Remzi Sadiku

18 September 2013 3	Partizani Tirana	2–2	Bylis Ballsh	Tirana
14:00 CEST	Ibrahimi (yellow card) 22'; Gërxho 43' (o.g.); Sodje 48'; Maliqi (yellow card) 70' (yellow-red card) 72'; Mazrekaj (yellow card) 78'; A. Hoxha (yellow card) 78'	Report	Meto 10', 31' (yellow card) 20'; Kuli (yellow card) 22'; Progni (yellow card) 64'; Basriu (yellow card) 81'; Haxho (yellow card) 82'	Stadium: Qemal Stafa Stadium; Attendance: 2,500; Referee: Laver Alla

21 September 2013 4	Besa Kavajë	0–1	Partizani Tirana	Kavajë
14:00 CEST	Berisha (yellow card) 71'; Muçaj (yellow card) 90+2'	Report	Sodje (yellow card) 6'; G. Krasniqi (yellow card) 28'; Murati (yellow card) 32'; Mitraj 61'; Buač (yellow card) 70'; B. Krasniqi (yellow card) 85'	Stadium: Besa Stadium; Attendance: 300; Referee: Enea Jorgji

28 September 2013 5	Partizani Tirana	0–0	Flamurtari Vlorë	Tirana (Note: The match was held at Selman Stërmasi Stadium due to reconstruction of the field of Qemal Stafa Stadium.)
14:00 CEST		Report	Arbëri (yellow card) 15'	Stadium: Selman Stërmasi Stadium; Attendance: 1,300; Referee: Ditmar Jubica

2 October 2013 6	Kukësi	0–1	Partizani Tirana	Krujë (Note: The match was held at Kastrioti Stadium due to reconstruction of the field of Zeqir Ymeri Stadium.)
14:00 CEST	Musolli (yellow card) 28'; Bratić (yellow card) 35'; Koçi (red card) 54'	Report	Ibrahimi (yellow card) 58'; Thana 77'; Udoh (yellow card) 79'	Stadium: Kastrioti Stadium; Attendance: 1,200; Referee: Enea Jorgji

12 October 2013 7	Partizani Tirana	1–0	Tirana	Tirana
19:00 CEST	Hyshmeri (yellow card) 4'; Demiri (yellow card) 47' (goal) 57'; A. Hoxha (yellow card) 89'	Report	Kërçiku (yellow card) 16'; Karabeci (yellow card) 37'; Pashaj (yellow card) 65'; Çaka (yellow card) 67'; Çota (yellow card) 73'; Vrapi (yellow card) 90+2'	Stadium: Qemal Stafa Stadium; Attendance: 8,000; Referee: Lorenc Jemini

19 October 2013 8	Lushnja	2–0	Partizani Tirana	Lushnjë
14:00 CEST	Mihani (yellow card) 18'; Gjyla (yellow card) 30'; Çela (yellow card) 46'; Trashi 47' (yellow card) 54'; Koreshi 59'; Bizhyti (yellow card) 79'	Report	Buač (yellow card) 30'; Thana (yellow card) 52'	Stadium: Abdurrahman Roza Haxhiu Stadium; Attendance: 6,000; Referee: Ditmar Jubica

26 October 2013 9	Partizani Tirana	0–1	Vllaznia Shkodër	Tirana
17:00 CEST	Ibrahimi (yellow card) 72'	Report	Tafili (yellow card) 36'; Shtubina 50'; Kraja (yellow card) 67'; Vujadinović (yellow card) 88'	Stadium: Qemal Stafa Stadium; Attendance: 1,000; Referee: Bardhyl Pashaj

2 November 2013 10	Skënderbeu Korçë	3–0	Partizani Tirana	Korçë
17:00 CET	Pejić 32', 90+3'; Ribaj 90+1'	Report	Oladele (yellow card) 83'	Stadium: Skënderbeu Stadium; Attendance: 5,500; Referee: Ditmar Jubica

9 November 2013 11	Partizani Tirana	3–0	Teuta Durrës	Tirana
14:00 CET	Malo 70', 75', 90+5' (yellow card) 71'; Buač (yellow card) 81'	Report	Da Silva Buiu (yellow card) 28'; Dosti (yellow card) 43'; Hodo (yellow card) 66'	Stadium: Qemal Stafa Stadium; Attendance: 1,500; Referee: Kridens Meta

24 November 2013 12	Partizani Tirana	1–0	Kastrioti Krujë	Tirana
14:00 CET	Malo 14' (pen.) (yellow card) 90+3'; Demiri (yellow card) 19'; B. Krasniqi (yellow card) 20'; Bordon (yellow card) 35'	Report	Xhafa (yellow card) 13'; Ferraj (yellow card) 20'	Stadium: Qemal Stafa Stadium; Attendance: 600; Referee: Emirjon Sino

1 December 2013 13	Partizani Tirana	2–1	Laçi	Tirana
13:30 CET	Murati (yellow card) 46'; Ibrahimi (yellow card) 70'; Maliqi 90'; Hyshmeri 90+1'	Report	Sefgjinaj (yellow card) 54'; Veliaj 70' (pen.); Nina (yellow card) 76'	Stadium: Qemal Stafa Stadium; Attendance: 2,000; Referee: Bardhyl Pashaj

8 December 2013 14	Bylis Ballsh	1–0	Partizani Tirana	Ballsh
13:00 CET	Llenga (yellow card) 35'; Kuli 50'	Report	Maliqi (yellow card) 24'	Stadium: Adush Muça Stadium; Attendance: 2,500; Referee: Andi Koçi

15 December 2013 15	Partizani Tirana	3–1	Besa Kavajë	Tirana
13:30 CET	Hyshmeri 41', 59' (pen.); Mazrekaj (yellow card) 88'; Demiri 90+4'	Report	Sefa 26'; Bejte (red card) 58'; E. Hoxha (yellow card) 75'; Batha (yellow card) 88'	Stadium: Qemal Stafa Stadium; Attendance: 0 (Note: The match was played behind the doors closed.); Referee: Ditmar Jubica

22 December 2013 16	Flamurtari Vlorë	1–0	Partizani Tirana	Vlorë
13:00 CET	Abilaliaj (yellow card) 8'; Zeqiri 13'; Begaj (yellow card) 76'	Report	Oladele (yellow card) 54'; B. Krasniqi (yellow card) 69'; Malo (yellow card) 71'; Maliqi (yellow card) 77'	Stadium: Flamurtari Stadium; Attendance: 3,000; Referee: Bardhyl Pashaj

1 February 2014 17	Partizani Tirana	0–0	Kukësi	Tirana
17:00 CET	Ibrahimi (yellow card) 73'	Report	Cikalleshi (yellow card) 33'; Progni (yellow card) 77'; Shameti (yellow card) 78'	Stadium: Qemal Stafa Stadium; Attendance: 7,000; Referee: Lorenc Jemini

7 February 2014 18	Tirana	1–0	Partizani Tirana	Tirana
18:00 CET	Kërçiku (yellow card) 54'; Karabeci (yellow card) 65'; Lika (yellow card) 70'; Gilberto 77'; Kalari (yellow card) 77'; Pashaj (yellow card) 80'	Report	Hoxha (yellow card) 51'; Krasniqi (yellow card) 70'; Musta (yellow card) 75'	Stadium: Qemal Stafa Stadium; Attendance: 7,800; Referee: Emirjon Sino

15 February 2014 19	Partizani Tirana	2–0	Lushnja	Tirana
14:00 CET	Memelli 2', 12'; Maliqi (yellow card) 75'	Report	Xhafa (yellow card) 13'; Bizhyti (yellow card) 14' (yellow-red card) 30'; Mihani (yellow card) 21'; Tiodorović (yellow card) 22'; Ruço (yellow card) 87'	Stadium: Qemal Stafa Stadium; Attendance: 1,500; Referee: Andi Koçi

23 February 2014 20	Vllaznia Shkodër	1–1	Partizani Tirana	Shkodër
13:00 CET	Bardulla (yellow card) 33'; Gocaj (yellow card) 36'; Vukčević 77'; Boçi (yellow card) 79'; Shtubina (yellow card) 84'	Report	Memelli (yellow card) 13'; Ibrahimi (yellow card) 27' (yellow-red card) 64'; Murati (yellow card) 37'; Mazrekaj (yellow card) 64' (goal) 70'; Nexhipi (yellow card) 64'	Stadium: Loro Boriçi Stadium; Attendance: 3,000; Referee: Remzi Sadiku

2 March 2014 21	Partizani Tirana	0–0	Skënderbeu Korçë	Tirana
14:00 CET	Rrahmani (yellow card) 30'; Pliska (yellow card) 61'; Udoh (yellow card) 65'; Dushku (yellow card) 80'; Memelli (yellow card) 89'	Report	Shkëmbi (yellow card) 34'	Stadium: Qemal Stafa Stadium; Attendance: 2,500; Referee: Enea Jorgji

8 March 2014 22	Teuta Durrës	1–1	Partizani Tirana	Durrës
14:00 CET	Xhafaj 60'; Kalu (yellow card) 67'; Samb (red card) 75'; Apezteguía (yellow card) 88'	Report	Nexhipi (yellow card) 54' (goal) 90+5'	Stadium: Niko Dovana Stadium; Attendance: 2,500; Referee: Kridens Meta

12 March 2014 23	Partizani Tirana	2–0	Bylis Ballsh	Tirana
18:00 CET	Memelli 5' (pen.); Nexhipi 44' (pen.); Hyshmeri (yellow card) 86'; Maliqi (yellow card) 90+3'	Report	Basriu (yellow card) 27'; Doshlaku (yellow card) 44'; Sulkja (yellow card) 71'	Stadium: Qemal Stafa Stadium; Attendance: 1,500; Referee: Ditmar Jubica

16 March 2014 24	Vllaznia Shkodër	0–1	Partizani Tirana	Shkodër
13:00 CET	Selimaj (yellow card) 45+1'; Boçi (yellow card) 79'; Beqiri (yellow card) 82'	Report	Nexhipi 45+2'	Stadium: Loro Boriçi Stadium; Attendance: 3,000; Referee: Enea Jorgji

23 March 2014 25	Partizani Tirana	1–1	Tirana	Tirana
20:00 CET	Rrahmani (yellow card) 6'; Hoxha (yellow card) 6'; Maliqi (yellow card) 37'; Ibrahimi (yellow card) 59'; Nexhipi 90+3'	Report	Morina 41'; Kërçiku (yellow card) 45+2'; Karabeci (yellow card) 51'; Pashaj (yellow card) 58'; Koreshi (yellow card) 65' (yellow-red card) 83'; Limani (yellow card) 90+2'	Stadium: Qemal Stafa Stadium; Attendance: 10,000; Referee: Enea Jorgji

30 March 2014 26	Flamurtari Vlorë	0–0	Partizani Tirana	Vlorë
17:00 CEST	Abilaliaj (yellow card) 24'; Pepa (yellow card) 89'	Report	Rrahmani (yellow card) 66'; B. Krasniqi (yellow card) 75'; Ibrahimi (yellow card) 84'	Stadium: Flamurtari Stadium; Attendance: 4,000; Referee: Ditmar Jubica

5 April 2014 27	Partizani Tirana	1–0	Besa Kavajë	Tirana
17:00 CEST	Memelli 61'	Report		Stadium: Qemal Stafa Stadium; Attendance: 3,000; Referee: Lorenc Jemini

13 April 2014 28	Teuta Durrës	3–1	Partizani Tirana	Durrës
17:00 CEST	Batha 30'; Nika 46'; Dosti (yellow card) 70' (goal) 80'	Report	Rrahmani (yellow card) 9'; Memelli 53'; Murati (yellow card) 76'; B. Krasniqi (yellow card) 89'	Stadium: Niko Dovana Stadium; Attendance: 1,250; Referee: Emirjon Sino

20 April 2014 29	Partizani Tirana	1–0	Kukësi	Tirana
17:00 CEST	Ibrahimi (yellow card) 27' (yellow-red card) 80'; Memelli 30' (yellow card) 53'; Dushku (yellow card) 41'	Report	Hysa (yellow card) 26'; Allmuça (yellow card) 90'	Stadium: Qemal Stafa Stadium; Attendance: 3,500; Referee: Bardhyl Pashaj

26 April 2014 30	Partizani Tirana	1–0	Kastrioti Krujë	Tirana (Note: The match was held at Selman Stërmasi Stadium due to reconstruction of the field of Qemal Stafa Stadium.)
16:00 CEST	Murati (yellow card) 32'; Sačer 47'	Report	R. Hoxha (yellow card) 6'; Sheta (yellow card) 32'; Daja (yellow card) 32'; Turdiu (yellow card) 35'	Stadium: Selman Stërmasi Stadium; Attendance: 1,100; Referee: Andi Koçi

30 April 2014 31	Laçi	2–0	Partizani Tirana	Laç
16:00 CEST	Thana (yellow card) 24'; Çela (yellow card) 55'; Vucaj 65' (pen.); Teqja (yellow card) 66'; Antanasijević 72' (o.g.)	Report	Dushku (yellow card) 18'; Memelli (yellow card) 43'; Oladele (yellow card) 46'; Ibrahimi (yellow card) 52'; Nexhipi (yellow card) 54'; B. Krasniqi (yellow card) 66'	Stadium: Laçi Stadium; Attendance: 2,500; Referee: Kridens Meta

4 May 2014 32	Partizani Tirana	1–2	Skënderbeu Korçë	Tirana
14:00 CEST	Maliqi (yellow card) 27'; G. Krasniqi (yellow card) 88'; Mazrekaj 90'	Report	Nimaga (yellow card) 41'; Shehi (yellow card) 54'; Lilaj (yellow card) 79'; Shkëmbi 86'; Pejić 90+2'	Stadium: Qemal Stafa Stadium; Attendance: 4,500; Referee: Enea Jorgji

10 May 2014 33	Lushnja	2–4	Partizani Tirana	Lushnjë
17:30 CEST	Bizhyti (yellow card) 19'; Canka 51', 57'; Gjyla (yellow card) 60'; Ruço (yellow card) 80'	Report	Nexhipi 61' (pen.), 81' (pen.); Ibrahimi 78'; Vatnikaj 89'	Stadium: Abdurrahman Roza Haxhiu Stadium; Attendance: 300; Referee: Adrian Beqiri

=== Albanian Cup ===
==== First round ====
23 October 2013 First leg	Ada Velipojë	1–1	Partizani Tirana	Velipojë
14:00 CEST	Çunaj 64'	Report	Dushku 79' (yellow card) 81'	Stadium: Fusha Sportive Adriatik; Attendance: 50; Referee: Olsid Ferataj

6 November 2013 Second leg	Partizani Tirana	3–1 (4–2 agg.)	Ada Velipojë	Yrshek, Kashar
13:30 CET	Bordon 22', 54'; Hyshmeri (yellow card) 45'; Malo 79' (pen.); Murati (yellow card) 90+1'	Report	Pllumaj (yellow card) 14'; Proda (yellow card) 53'; Pelinku 69'; Hysaj (yellow card) 79'	Stadium: Olimpiku Stadium; Attendance: 150; Referee: Erald Demiraj

==== Second round ====
4 December 2013 First leg	Partizani Tirana	0–0	Vllaznia Shkodër	Tirana
13:30 CET	Murati (yellow card) 75'	Report	Sykaj (yellow card) 24'; Dibra (yellow card) 63'; Bardulla (yellow card) 68'	Stadium: Qemal Stafa Stadium; Attendance: 1,500; Referee: Kreshnik Cjapi

18 December 2013 Second leg	Vllaznia Shkodër	1–0 (a.e.t.) (1–0 agg.)	Partizani Tirana	Shkodër
13:00 CET	Dibra (yellow card) 44'; Kraja (yellow card) 45'; Semina (yellow card) 100'; Tafili 102'; Belisha (yellow card) 116'; Hajdari (yellow card) 117'	Report	Krasniqi (yellow card) 104'	Stadium: Loro Boriçi Stadium; Attendance: 2,300; Referee: Enea Jorgji
