= 2012–13 FK Partizani Tirana season =

Partizani Tirana
2012–13 season
- President: Lulëzim Sallaku
- Head coach: Nikolin Çoçlli (until 19 January 2013); Shpëtim Duro (from 19 January to 3 March 2013); Hasan Lika (from 4 March 2013)
- Stadium: Qemal Stafa Stadium
- Kategoria e Parë: 2nd (promoted)
- Albanian Cup: First round
- Top goalscorer: League: Julian Malo (7); All: Julian Malo (7)
Home colours	Away colours

In the 2012–13 season, Partizani Tirana competed in the Kategoria e Parë after promotion from the Kategoria e Dytë.

== Competitions ==
=== Kategoria e Parë ===
==== League table ====
Pos	Team	Pld	W	D	L	GF	GA	GD	Pts	Promotion or relegation
1	Lushnja (C, P)	30	20	6	4	48	22	+26	66	Promotion to 2013–14 Kategoria Superiore
2	Partizani (P)	30	16	8	6	39	33	+6	56	Promotion to 2013–14 Kategoria Superiore
3	Tërbuni	30	11	10	9	40	30	+10	43	
4	Adriatiku	30	12	7	11	48	45	+3	43	
5	Pogradeci	30	13	3	14	49	44	+5	42	

Source: Soccerway
Rules for classification: 1) points; 2) goal difference; 3) number of goals scored; 4) head-to-head points; 5) head-to-head goal difference; 6) draw. (Head-to-head record is applied for clubs with the same number of points only once all matches between said clubs have been played.)
(C) Champions; (P) Promoted

==== Results summary ====
Overall								Home						Away					
Pld	W	D	L	GF	GA	GD	Pts	W	D	L	GF	GA	GD	W	D	L	GF	GA	GD
30	16	8	6	39	33	+6	56	8	4	3	21	18	+3	8	4	3	18	15	+3

Source: Competitive matches

==== Results by round ====
Round	1	2	3	4	5	6	7	8	9	10	11	12	13	14	15	16	17	18	19	20	21	22	23	24	25	26	27	28	29	30
Ground	A	H	A	H	A	H	A	H	A	H	A	H	A	A	H	H	A	H	A	H	A	H	A	H	A	H	A	H	H	A
Result	W	L	L	W	W	W	D	W	L	W	D	D	W	W	L	D	W	W	L	W	W	W	D	W	W	D	W	L	D	D
Position	3	10	13	6	5	3	5	2	6	2	4	4	3	2	3	4	4	3	5	3	2	2	2	2	2	2	2	2	2	2

Source: Competitive matches
A = Away; H = Home; W = Win; D = Draw; L = Loss

==== Matches ====
1 September 2012 1	Ada Velipojë	0–1	Partizani Tirana	Velipojë
16:00 CEST	Puka (yellow card) 78'	Report	Buliq (yellow card) 19'; Braho 63'	Stadium: Fusha Sportive Adriatik; Referee: Skerdi Greca

8 September 2012 2	Partizani Tirana	0–3	Butrinti Sarandë	Tirana
16:00 CEST	Karakaçi (yellow card) 40'; Braho (yellow card) 45+1'; Pashaj (yellow card) 81'	Report	Muço 13', 90+2' (pen.); Xhuvani (yellow card) 33'; S. Gjoka (yellow card) 37'; Osmani 61'; Demi (yellow card) 67'	Stadium: Selman Stërmasi Stadium; Referee: Laver Alla

15 September 2012 3	Elbasani	3–1	Partizani Tirana	Elbasan
16:00 CEST	Dalipi 2', 21'; Ruçi (red card) 41'; Okoronkwo (yellow card) 87'; Tafani 88'; Hila (yellow card) 90+1'	Report	Hithi (yellow card) 15'; Braho (yellow card) 38'; G. Gjoka 77'; Pashaj (yellow card) 88'; Lini (yellow card) 89'	Stadium: Rudi Bizhuta Stadium; Referee: Ditmar Jubica

22 September 2012 4	Partizani Tirana	3–2	Tërbuni Pukë	Laç
16:00 CEST	Xh. Roshi (yellow card) 14'; Rroca 23' (o.g.); Pashaj (yellow card) 44'; B. Malaj (red card) 45+1'; Shala (yellow card) 45+2'; Karakaçi (yellow card) 75'; Alçani 87'; Lini 89'	Report	Rroca (yellow card) 44'; Karaj 64'; Repaj 85'	Stadium: Laçi Stadium; Referee: Tanush Latifi

29 September 2012 5	Burreli	1–2	Partizani Tirana	Velipojë (Note: The match was held at Fusha Sportive Adriatik due to reconstruction of Liri Ballabani Stadium.)
16:00 CEST	Pirani (yellow card) 45+3' (goal) 66'; Dalipi (yellow card) 57'; Lopci (yellow card) 60'; Melani (red card) 77'; Kola (yellow card) 88'	Report	Bleta (yellow card) 5'; Sulçe 35'; Duqi (yellow card) 45+3'; Buliq (yellow card) 63'; Shala 75'; G. Gjoka (yellow card) 90'	Stadium: Fusha Sportive Adriatik; Referee: Blerim Ziri

6 October 2012 6	Partizani Tirana	3–2	Dinamo Tirana	Tirana
15:00 CEST	Shala 28'; Duqi (yellow card) 55'; Braho (yellow card) 71'; Lini 71'; Pashaj (yellow card) 79'; Thana (yellow card) 90'; Sulçe 90+3' (yellow card) 90+4' (Çema (yellow card) 90+4')	Report	Ferra (yellow card) 10'; Muça 15' (yellow card) 42'; Likmeta 23' (yellow card) 70'; Sekseni (yellow card) 54'; Lamellari (yellow card) 71'; Rexhepi (yellow card) 72'	Stadium: Selman Stërmasi Stadium; Referee: Remzi Sadiku

13 October 2012 7	Iliria Fushë-Krujë	1–1	Partizani Tirana	Fushë-Krujë
14:30 CEST	Ivanaj 37'; Shehi (yellow card) 57'	Report	Pashaj 40'; Alçani (yellow card) 75'	Stadium: Redi Maloku Stadium; Referee: Bardhyl Pashaj

22 October 2012 8	Partizani Tirana	2–1	Pogradeci	Tirana
14:30 CEST	Alçani (yellow card) 30'; G. Gjoka 47'; Pashaj (yellow card) 61'; Lini 77'; Karakaçi (yellow card) 83'	Report	Pengu 40'; Zguro (yellow card) 55'; Jahaj (yellow card) 88'	Stadium: Selman Stërmasi Stadium; Referee: Ditmar Jubica

8 November 2012 (Note: The match was originally scheduled to be played on 27 October, but it was delayed due to the bad weather conditions.) 9	Adriatiku Mamurrasi	3–0	Partizani Tirana	Mamurras
14:00 CET	Allmeta (yellow card) 24' (yellow-red card) 82'; Baçi 38'; Pustina (yellow card) 40' (goal) 49'; A. Malaj (yellow card) 50'; Demaj (yellow card) 70'; Jushi 80'	Report	Lini (yellow card) 48'; Thana (yellow card) 75'; Alçani (yellow card) 90+2'	Stadium: Mamurras Stadium; Referee: Lorenc Jemini

5 November 2012 10	Partizani Tirana	1–0	Gramshi	Tirana
14:00 CET	Braho 4'; G. Gjoka (yellow card) 69'; K. Roshi (yellow card) 78'; Lleshi (yellow card) 80'	Report	Bella (yellow card) 32' (yellow-red card) 69'	Stadium: Qemal Stafa Stadium; Referee: Tanush Latifi

14 November 2012 11	Himara	1–1	Partizani Tirana	Sarandë
14:00 CET	Qëndro (yellow card) 6' (yellow-red card) 88'; Idrizaj (yellow card) 21'; Er. Kuçi (yellow card) 58'; Veshaj 74' (yellow card) 75'; Mumajezi (yellow card) 77'	Report	Thana (yellow card) 21'; Shala (yellow card) 60'; Hithi (yellow card) 84'; Pashaj 90+5'	Stadium: Butrinti Stadium; Referee: Andi Koçi

19 November 2012 12	Partizani Tirana	1–1	Naftëtari Kuçovë	Tirana
14:00 CET	K. Roshi (yellow card) 11'; Karakaçi (yellow card) 17'; Duqi (yellow card) 35'; Agolli (yellow card) 45+1'; Sulçe 46'	Report	Rustemi 7'; Kajo (yellow card) 9'; Gega (yellow card) 37'; Hoxha (yellow card) 45+1'; Daci (yellow card) 90+1'; Zylyftari (yellow card) 90+1'	Stadium: Qemal Stafa Stadium; Referee: Hermal Llapra

24 November 2012 13	Kamza	0–2	Partizani Tirana	Kavajë (Note: The match was held at Besa Stadium due to reconstruction of Kamëz Stadium.)
14:00 CET	F. Tafaj (yellow card) 16'; Beqiri (yellow card) 26'	Report	Thana 17' (pen.); Hithi (yellow card) 32'; Sulçe 46'	Stadium: Besa Stadium; Referee: Skerdi Greca

1 December 2012 14	Besëlidhja Lezhë	1–2	Partizani Tirana	Lezhë
14:00 CET	Danaj (yellow card) 17'; Kepi (yellow card) 17'; Shytani (yellow card) 22'; Dibra 24'; Peqini (yellow card) 70'	Report	Shala 18'; Lini (yellow card) 21'; Alçani (yellow card) 36'; Thana (yellow card) 45'; G. Gjoka 85'	Stadium: Brian Filipi Stadium; Referee: Bardhyl Pashaj

8 December 2012 15	Partizani Tirana	0–1	Lushnja	Tirana
17:00 CET	Sulçe (yellow card) 9'; Pashaj (yellow card) 29'; Duqi (red card) 65'; Alçani (yellow card) 85'; Thana (yellow card) 89'	Report	Galica 31' (yellow card) 40'; Bizhyti (yellow card) 31'; Grishaj (yellow card) 62' (yellow-red card) 77'; Sula (yellow card) 72'	Stadium: Qemal Stafa Stadium; Referee: Lorenc Jemini

9 February 2013 16	Partizani Tirana	1–1	Ada Velipojë	Tirana
14:30 CET	Ishka (yellow card) 44'; Abazaj 51'; Udoh (yellow card) 68'; Thana (yellow card) 71'	Report	Dushkaj 11'; Karakaçi (yellow card) 16'; Hoti (yellow card) 21' (yellow-red card) 87'; Lini (yellow card) 23'	Stadium: Qemal Stafa Stadium; Referee: Remzi Sadiku

16 February 2013 17	Butrinti Sarandë	1–2	Partizani Tirana	Sarandë
14:30 CET	Batha (yellow card) 55' (goal) 84'; Muço (yellow card) 59'	Report	Lala (yellow card) 38'; Malo 44', 56'; Tushe (yellow card) 46'; Abazaj (yellow card) 85'	Stadium: Butrinti Stadium; Referee: Lorenc Jemini

27 February 2013 18	Partizani Tirana	1–0	Elbasani	Tirana
18:00 CET	F. Tafaj 14' (yellow card) 64'; Abazaj (yellow card) 33'	Report	En. Kuçi (yellow card) 7'; Gava (yellow card) 27'; Kaçuli (yellow card) 43'; Gjini (yellow card) 82'	Stadium: Qemal Stafa Stadium; Referee: Elvis Peza

3 March 2013 19	Tërbuni Pukë	1–0	Partizani Tirana	Pukë
15:00 CET	Mone 13' (yellow card) 13'; Antić (yellow card) 25'	Report	Udoh (yellow card) 31'; F. Tafaj (yellow card) 67'	Stadium: Ismail Xhemali Stadium; Referee: Kridens Meta

9 March 2013 20	Partizani Tirana	2–1	Burreli	Yrshek, Kashar
15:00 CET	Malo 33' (pen.); Lala 77'	Report	Melani (yellow card) 4'; Murati (yellow card) 32'; Dalipi (yellow card) 88'; Rahova 90+4'	Stadium: Olimpiku Stadium; Referee: Shkëlqim Guçe

16 March 2013 21	Dinamo Tirana	0–1	Partizani Tirana	Yrshek, Kashar
15:00 CET	Dosti (yellow card) 25'; Tragaj (yellow card) 61'; Lamellari (yellow card) 90+4'	Report	Lala 3' (yellow card) 89'; Thana (yellow card) 70'	Stadium: Olimpiku Stadium; Referee: Elvis Peza

23 March 2013 22	Partizani Tirana	1–0	Iliria Fushë-Krujë	Yrshek, Kashar
15:00 CET	Agastra 32'; Duqi (yellow card) 36'	Report	Kurti (yellow card) 14'; Lusha (yellow card) 33'; Sala (yellow card) 70'; Gjonpalaj (yellow card) 81'; Baku (yellow card) 87'; Hima (yellow card) 89'	Stadium: Olimpiku Stadium; Referee: Adrian Beqiri

30 March 2013 23	Pogradeci	0–0	Partizani Tirana	Pogradec
15:00 CET	Pengu (yellow card) 11'; Jahaj (yellow card) 26'; Shyti (yellow card) 45+1'; Hysenllari (yellow card) 87'	Report	Oladele (yellow card) 13'; Sulçe (yellow card) 90+3'	Stadium: Gjorgji Kyçyku Stadium; Referee: Elvis Peza

8 April 2013 24	Partizani Tirana	3–2	Adriatiku Mamurrasi	Tirana
20:00 CEST	Malo 4' (pen.), 9'; F. Tafaj (yellow card) 88'; Lala 89'	Report	Metaj 1', 55'; Myrtaj (yellow card) 3'; A. Malaj (yellow card) 19'	Stadium: Qemal Stafa Stadium; Referee: Edvin Hoxha

11 April 2013 25	Gramshi	0–1	Partizani Tirana	Elbasan (Note: The match was held at Rudi Bizhuta Stadium due to Gramshi's ban from playing at Mislim Koçi Stadium.)
16:00 CEST	Toçi (yellow card) 31'; Kaloshi (yellow card) 55'; Basriu (yellow card) 63'; Çutra (yellow card) 76'	Report	Lala 66'; Petro (yellow card) 68'; Adrović (yellow card) 90+2'	Stadium: Rudi Bizhuta Stadium; Referee: Blerim Ziri

14 April 2013 26	Partizani Tirana	1–1	Himara	Tirana
16:00 CEST	Lala (yellow card) 33'; Tushe (yellow card) 33'; Malo (yellow card) 67' (goal) 85'	Report	Gjombrati (yellow card) 13'; Alo (yellow card) 30'; Idrizaj (yellow card) 33'; Dhrami 52'; Veshaj (yellow card) 58'; Er. Kuçi (yellow card) 89'; Caushaj (yellow card) 90+2'	Stadium: Selman Stërmasi Stadium; Referee: Kridens Meta

20 April 2013 27	Naftëtari Kuçovë	1–2	Partizani Tirana	Elbasan (Note: The match was held at Rudi Bizhuta Stadium due to Naftëtari's ban from playing at Bashkim Sulejmani Stadium.)
16:00 CEST	Gega (yellow card) 27'; Zylyftari 47' (pen.); Azizaj (yellow card) 45+1'	Report	Abazaj 22'; E. Tafaj (yellow card) 39'; Tushe 44'	Stadium: Rudi Bizhuta Stadium; Referee: Enea Jorgji

27 April 2013 28	Partizani Tirana	1–2	Kamza	Yrshek, Kashar
16:00 CEST	Thana (yellow card) 10'; Mezini 54' (yellow card) 54'	Report	Bytyçi 60' (pen.); S. Gjoka 63'	Stadium: Olimpiku Stadium; Referee: Erald Demiraj

4 May 2013 29	Partizani Tirana	1–1	Besëlidhja Lezhë	Yrshek, Kashar
17:00 CEST	Tushe 74'	Report	Nedeljković 27'; Aritonović (yellow card) 68'; Peqini (yellow card) 77'; Pjetrushi (red card) 77'	Stadium: Olimpiku Stadium; Referee: Enea Jorgji

12 May 2013 30	Lushnja	2–2	Partizani Tirana	Lushnjë
17:00 CEST	Bizhyti (yellow card) 18'; Çela (yellow card) 39'; Stojković 45' (yellow card) 45'; Canka 63' (yellow card) 63'	Report	Udoh (yellow card) 31'; Oladele 44'; Malo 69' (yellow card) 69'; Pashaj (yellow card) 75'; Alçani (yellow card) 78'; Tafaj (yellow card) 81'	Stadium: Abdurrahman Roza Haxhiu Stadium; Referee: Servet Bogdani

=== Albanian Cup ===
==== First round ====
26 September 2012 First leg	Partizani Tirana	1–2	Tirana	Tirana
19:00 CEST	Thana 13' (yellow card) 80'; Sulçe (yellow card) 37'; Duqi (yellow card) 82'	Report	Morina 8'; Pisha (yellow card) 21'; Taku (yellow card) 34'; Pashaj (yellow card) 42'; G. Lika 43'; Karabeci (yellow card) 88'	Stadium: Qemal Stafa Stadium; Attendance: 6,500; Referee: Lorenc Jemini

3 October 2012 Second leg	Tirana	1–0 (3–1 agg.)	Partizani Tirana	Tirana
14:30 CEST	Çota 8'; Karabeci (yellow card) 84'	Report	Thana (yellow card) 45'	Stadium: Selman Stërmasi Stadium; Attendance: 2,000; Referee: Olsi Sokoli
