= List of Albanian football transfers summer 2008 =

This is a list of Albanian football transfers for the 2008-09 season by club. Only transfers of the Albanian Superliga are included.

== Player Transfers ==
=== Dinamo Tirana ===
In: Note: Flags indicate national team as defined under FIFA eligibility rules; some limited exceptions apply. Players may hold more than one non-FIFA nationality.

No.	Pos.	Nation	Player
—	GK	ALB	Sulejman Hoxha (from Erzeni)
—	FW	ALB	Daniel Xhafa (on loan from Tirana)
—	DF	ALB	Elvis Sina (from Tirana)
—	MF	ALB	Hetlem Capja (from Tirana)
—	DF	ALB	Julian Brahja (from Kastrioti)
—	DF	ALB	Julian Ahmataj (from Elbasani)
—	FW	ALB	Fatjon Sefa (from Lushnja)
—	MF	ALB	Ilirjan Çaushaj (loan return from Teuta)
—	FW	ALB	Sebino Plaku (from (Norway) Ham-Kam)
—	MF	ALB	Aldo Mitraj (from (Greece) Skoda Xanthi)
—	GK	ARG	Daniel Bertoya (from (Argentina) CSDDJ)
—	DF	ARG	Alejandro Palladino (from Unattached)
—	MF	ARG	Agustín González Tapia (from (Argentina) Guillermo Brown)
—	FW	ARG	Cristian Campozano (from (Argentina) La Plata)
—	DF	SRB	Danilo Nikolić (from (Serbia) Bežanija)
—	MF	CRO	Pëllumb Jusufi (from (Slovenia) Domzale)
—	FW	CRO	Frane Petricevic (from (Slovenia) NK Celje)
—	FW	BIH	Nedim Halilovic (from (Croatia) Rijeka)

Out: Note: Flags indicate national team as defined under FIFA eligibility rules; some limited exceptions apply. Players may hold more than one non-FIFA nationality.

No.	Pos.	Nation	Player
—	MF	ALB	Sokol Ishka (to Besa)
—	FW	ALB	Bekim Kuli (to Besa)
—	FW	ALB	Eleandro Pema (to Flamurtari)
—	MF	ALB	Ilirjan Çaushaj (on loan to Flamurtari)
—	DF	ALB	Julian Ahmataj (loan return to Elbasani)
—	FW	ALB	Daniel Xhafa (to Tirana)
—	DF	ALB	Ditmar Bicaj (to (Bulgaria) Belasitsa Petrich)
—	DF	NGA	Abraham Alechenwu (to Tirana)
—	DF	CRO	Goran Vincetic (to (Austria) Weiz)
—	FW	CRO	Pero Pejic (to (Austria) Kapfenberger SV)
—	DF	CRO	Dario Bodrušić (to (Croatia) Rijeka)
—	MF	MKD	Artim Položani (to (North Macedonia) Vardar Skopje)
—	MF	ARG	Mauricio Hanuch (to (Argentina) Platense)
—	GK	ARG	Daniel Bertoya (Released)
—	DF	ARG	Alejandro Palladino (Released)
—	MF	ARG	Agustín González Tapia (Released)
—	FW	ARG	Cristian Campozano (Released)

=== Apolonia Fier ===
In: Note: Flags indicate national team as defined under FIFA eligibility rules; some limited exceptions apply. Players may hold more than one non-FIFA nationality.

No.	Pos.	Nation	Player
—	GK	ALB	Erjon Dine (from Flamurtari)
—	DF	ALB	Renaldo Bedini (from Flamurtari)
—	MF	ALB	Klodian Skënderi (from Flamurtari)
—	MF	ALB	Shkëlzen Kelmendi (from Skrapari)
—	FW	ALB	Klodian Asllani (from Kastrioti)
—	FW	ALB	Aulent Guri (from KF Kamza)
—	DF	ALB	Agim Meto (from Besa)
—	DF	ALB	Maringlen Shoshi (from Besa)
—	FW	BRA	Washington Galvão Junior (from Unattached)
—	MF	SRB	Semir Hadžibulic (from (North Macedonia) FK Shkendija 79)
—	DF	SRB	Aleksandar Sreckovic (from (Serbia) FK Sevojno)
—	MF	SRB	Predrag Mirceta (from (Serbia) FK Hajduk Beograd)
—	MF	SRB	Predrag Mirceta (from (Serbia) FK Hajduk Beograd)
—	FW	SRB	Mladen Brkic (from (Serbia) OFK Mladenovac)

Out: Note: Flags indicate national team as defined under FIFA eligibility rules; some limited exceptions apply. Players may hold more than one non-FIFA nationality.

No.	Pos.	Nation	Player
—	DF	ALB	Agim Meto (to Besa)
—	DF	ALB	Maringlen Shoshi (to Besa)
—	DF	ALB	Raimond Shala (to Partizani)
—	FW	ALB	Lejdi Liçaj (to Flamurtari)
—	FW	NGA	Charles Ofoyen (to Bilisht)
—	FW	ALB	Andi Ribaj (to Vlora)

=== Besa Kavajë ===
In: Note: Flags indicate national team as defined under FIFA eligibility rules; some limited exceptions apply. Players may hold more than one non-FIFA nationality.

No.	Pos.	Nation	Player
—	DF	ALB	Agim Meto (from Apolonia)
—	DF	ALB	Maringlen Shoshi (from Apolonia)
—	FW	ALB	Vangjel Mile (from Teuta)
—	DF	ALB	Erion Xhafa (from Tirana)
—	DF	ALB	Edlir Tetova (from Elbasani)
—	MF	ALB	Artan Sakaj (from Elbasani)
—	MF	ALB	Sokol Ishka (from Dinamo)
—	FW	ALB	Bekim Kuli (from Dinamo)
—	FW	ALB	Elham Galica (from Ada)
—	FW	ALB	Arbër Abilaliaj (from Partizani)
—	FW	ALB	Robert Grizha (from (Ukraine) Vorskla Poltava)
—	MF	KOS	Fitim Haliti (from (Kosovo) KF Besa)
—	DF	MKD	Bilal Velija (from (Azerbaijan) Olimpik Baku)
—	FW	FRA	Piko Malek Binogol (from Kastrioti)

Out: Note: Flags indicate national team as defined under FIFA eligibility rules; some limited exceptions apply. Players may hold more than one non-FIFA nationality.

No.	Pos.	Nation	Player
—	DF	ALB	Elvis Kaja (to Naftëtari)
—	MF	ALB	Bruno Okshtuni (to Naftëtari)
—	MF	ALB	Daniel Roshi (to Naftëtari)
—	DF	ALB	Agim Meto (to Apolonia)
—	DF	ALB	Maringlen Shoshi (to Apolonia)
—	FW	ALB	Vangjel Mile (to Teuta)
—	MF	ALB	Amarildo Belisha (to Vllaznia)
—	FW	ALB	Elham Galica (to Flamurtari)
—	DF	ALB	Andi Lila (to Tirana)
—	DF	ALB	Albert Duro (to Unattached)
—	FW	ALB	Parid Xhihani (to (Ukraine) Zorya Luhansk)
—	MF	KOS	Alban Dragusha (to (Kosovo) Trepça Mitrovicë)
—	MF	MKD	Artim Sakiri (to (Azerbaijan) Qarabag Agdam)
—	MF	MKD	Zekirija Ramadan (to (Azerbaijan) Qarabag Agdam)
—	MF	NGA	Abdullahi Ishaka (to (Finland) FC Haka)
—	DF	CMR	Emanuel Bikoula (to Unattached)
—	FW	FRA	Piko Malek Binogol (to Unattached)

=== Bylis Ballsh ===
In: Note: Flags indicate national team as defined under FIFA eligibility rules; some limited exceptions apply. Players may hold more than one non-FIFA nationality.

No.	Pos.	Nation	Player
—	FW	ALB	Rigels Zeqo (from Tomori)
—	DF	ALB	Alban Muca (from Tirana)
—	DF	ALB	Roland Nenaj (from Elbasani)
—	MF	ALB	Endri Dalipi (from Elbasani)
—	MF	ALB	Bledar Hodo (from Teuta)
—	MF	ALB	Egert Kuci (from Shkumbini)
—	FW	ALB	Klevis Dalipi (from Shkumbini)
—	MF	ALB	Maringlen Kule (from Skënderbeu)
—	FW	ALB	Olgert Stafa (from Kastrioti)
—	MF	ALB	Marenglen Kapaj (from Vllaznia)
—	DF	ALB	Hektor Idrizi (from Unattached)
—	DF	ALB	Gentjan Muça (from (Germany) VSK Osterholz-Scharmbeck)
—	DF	CGO	Sasa Delain (from Vllaznia)
—	DF	BEL	Emir Ujkani (from (Belgium) KV Kortrijk)
—	MF	BEL	Cuzet Filiz (from Unattached)
—	MF	BFA	Moussa Kaboré (from (Morocco) Wydad Casablanca)
—	FW	MAR	El Archi Adnane (from (Cyprus) APEP Pitsilia)
—	DF	POR	Pedro Neves (from (Portugal) Torreense)
—	GK	MKD	Mupceaocku Auc Pau (from Unattached)

Out: Note: Flags indicate national team as defined under FIFA eligibility rules; some limited exceptions apply. Players may hold more than one non-FIFA nationality.

No.	Pos.	Nation	Player
—	FW	ALB	Rigels Zeqo (to Albpetrol)
—	FW	ALB	Bardhyl Elezi (to Lushnja)
—	FW	ALB	Amarildo Dimo (to Luftëtari)
—	MF	ALB	Myqerem Heqimaj (to Unattached)
—	MF	CMR	Mohamadolu Abdouraman (to Gramozi)

=== KF Elbasani ===
In: Note: Flags indicate national team as defined under FIFA eligibility rules; some limited exceptions apply. Players may hold more than one non-FIFA nationality.

No.	Pos.	Nation	Player
—	MF	ALB	Orgest Gava (from youth team)
—	GK	ALB	Alfred Osmani (from Tirana)
—	DF	ALB	Endrit Vrapi (from Tirana)
—	MF	ALB	Engert Bakalli (from Tirana)
—	FW	ALB	Erbim Fagu (from Tirana)
—	MF	ALB	Oriand Abazaj (from Kastrioti)
—	MF	ALB	Eriol Merxha (from Kastrioti)
—	MF	ALB	Jozef Thana (from Skënderbeu)
—	DF	ALB	Mardjan Kacollja (from Shkumbini)
—	MF	ALB	Jozef Thana (from KS Skenderbeu Korce)
—	FW	ALB	Gentian Stojku (from Shkumbini)
—	DF	ALB	Ardit Beqiri (from Partizani)
—	MF	ALB	Julian Ahmataj (from Dinamo)
—	GK	ALB	Parid Berdufi (from Flamurtari)
—	MF	KOS	Emin Baliqi (from Besëlidhja)
—	FW	VEN	Jorge Francisco Casanova (from (Venezuela) Caracas)

Out: Note: Flags indicate national team as defined under FIFA eligibility rules; some limited exceptions apply. Players may hold more than one non-FIFA nationality.

No.	Pos.	Nation	Player
—	MF	ALB	Aldo Bello (to Bilisht)
—	GK	ALB	Irakli Toci (to Turbina)
—	DF	ALB	Roland Nenaj (to Bylis)
—	DF	ALB	Edlir Tetova (to Besa)
—	MF	ALB	Artan Sakaj (to Besa)
—	MF	ALB	Endri Dalipi (to Bylis)
—	MF	ALB	Julian Ahmataj (to Dinamo)
—	MF	ALB	Alsid Tafili (to Tërbuni)
—	FW	ALB	Julian Gerxho (to Shkumbini)
—	FW	CGO	Richard Bokatola (to Lushnja)
—	DF	KOS	Fisnik Papuqi (to (Montenegro) Jedinstvo)
—	FW	KOS	Fisnik Gashi (to (North Macedonia) Milano Kumanovo)
—	FW	KOS	Arsim Plepolli (to Unattached)
—	GK	SRB	Dragan Vranic (to Unattached)
—	DF	MKD	Nikola Karcev (to (Russia) Terek Grozny)
—	MF	MKD	Toni Meglenski (to (North Macedonia) Vardar Skopje)
—	MF	MKD	Ardijan Nuhiji (to (Iran) Steel Azin)
—	FW	MKD	Arben Nuhiji (retired)
—	DF	BIH	Adin Mulaosmanovic (retired)
—	FW	CMR	Bernard Tchoutang (retired)

=== Flamurtari ===
In: Note: Flags indicate national team as defined under FIFA eligibility rules; some limited exceptions apply. Players may hold more than one non-FIFA nationality.

No.	Pos.	Nation	Player
—	MF	ALB	Orgest Gava (from youth team)
—	GK	ALB	Alfred Osmani (from Tirana)
—	FW	VEN	Jorge Francisco Casanova (from (Venezuela) Caracas)

Out: Note: Flags indicate national team as defined under FIFA eligibility rules; some limited exceptions apply. Players may hold more than one non-FIFA nationality.

No.	Pos.	Nation	Player
—	GK	ALB	Erjon Dine (to Apolonia)
—	DF	ALB	Roland Bedini (to Apolonia)
—	MF	ALB	Klodian Skënderi (to Apolonia)
—	GK	ALB	Parid Berdufi (to Apolonia)
—	MF	ALB	Edom Idrizi (to Unattached)
—	DF	CRO	Anton Dedaj (to Croatia Sesvete)
—	FW	BRA	Daniel Alves (retired)
