= List of Albanian football transfers summer 2013 =

This is a list of Albanian football transfers for the 2013 summer transfer window by club. Only transfers of clubs in the Albanian Superliga will be included.

The summer transfer window will open on 1 June 2013, although a few transfers may take place prior to that date. The window will close at midnight on 31 August 2013. Players without a club may join one at any time, either during or in between transfer windows.

== Superliga ==
=== Besa Kavajë ===
In: Note: Flags indicate national team as defined under FIFA eligibility rules; some limited exceptions apply. Players may hold more than one non-FIFA nationality.

No.	Pos.	Nation	Player
9	FW	ALB	Vangjel Mile (from Shkumbini Peqin)
10	MF	ALB	Oldi Majtara (from (Malta) Zejtun)
13	GK	ALB	Elton Maksuti (from Besa Kavajë U-19)
17	FW	ALB	Sindri Guri (from Vllaznia Shkodër)
19	GK	ALB	Endrit Cako (from Apolonia Fier)
20	DF	ALB	Ledion Muçaj (from Apolonia Fier)
22	MF	ALB	Alked Celhaka (from Besa Kavajë U-19)
23	DF	ALB	Shaqir Stafa (from Teuta Durrës)
24	FW	ALB	Darlien Bajaziti (from Besa Kavajë U-19)
25	DF	ALB	Besmi Kullolli (from Besa Kavajë U-19)
26	MF	ALB	Fisnik Ramadanaj (from (Kosovo) Ferizaj)
—	DF	MNE	Simo Goranović (from Unknown)
—	DF	ALB	Bajram Jashanica (loan from Skënderbeu Korçë)
—	DF	ALB	Mirel Duka (loan return from Shkumbini Peqin)

Out: Note: Flags indicate national team as defined under FIFA eligibility rules; some limited exceptions apply. Players may hold more than one non-FIFA nationality.

No.	Pos.	Nation	Player
—	GK	ALB	Alban Hoxha (to Partizani)
—	DF	ALB	Gëzim Krasniqi (to Partizani)
—	MF	ALB	Meglid Mihani (to Lushnja)
—	DF	ALB	Mirel Duka (loan to Luftëtari Gjirokastër)
—	FW	SRB	Bojan Malinić (to (Serbia) Radnički)
—	MF	ALB	Parid Xhihani
—	DF	CRO	Predrag Pocuca
—	FW	ALB	Dorjan Bubeqi (end of career)
—	DF	NGA	Abraham Alechenwu (to Kastrioti Krujë)
—	DF	ALB	Ervis Kaja (to Tirana)
—	MF	ALB	Sokol Cikalleshi (to Kukësi)
—	FW	ALB	Mateo Hasa (to Albpetrol)
—	FW	ALB	Isa Eminhaziri (to (Kosovo) Liria)

=== Bylis Ballsh ===
In: Note: Flags indicate national team as defined under FIFA eligibility rules; some limited exceptions apply. Players may hold more than one non-FIFA nationality.

No.	Pos.	Nation	Player
1	GK	ALB	Mario Memaj (from Naftëtari)
3	DF	ALB	Endrit Idrizi (from Himarë)
4	MF	ALB	Albano Caushaj (from Himarë)
5	DF	ALB	Elton Basriu (from Gramshi)
8	MF	NGA	Amoo Owoeye (loan return from Tomori Berat)
11	MF	NGA	Michal Ikpe (from Bylis Ballsh U-19)
12	GK	ALB	Shkëlzen Ruçi (from Elbasani)
16	MF	ALB	Xhuljo Tahitaj (from Bylis Ballsh U-19)
21	MF	ALB	Bekim Kuli (from Skënderbeu Korçë)
22	MF	NGA	James Adeniyi (loan return from Tomori Berat)
23	DF	ALB	Albi Llenga (from Naftëtari)
26	DF	ALB	Saimir Idrizi (from Bylis Ballsh U-19)
—	FW	KOS	Ruhan Foniqi (from (Kosovo) Ditra)
—	DF	ALB	Orgest Buzi (from Bylis Ballsh U-19)
—	MF	ALB	Erald Kolgega (from Bylis Ballsh U-19)
—	FW	NGA	Christopher Elijah (from (Finland) Oulun)
—	MF	KOS	Xhynejt Cutra (from Gramshi)
—	DF	NGA	Felix Udoh (loan return from Partizani)

Out: Note: Flags indicate national team as defined under FIFA eligibility rules; some limited exceptions apply. Players may hold more than one non-FIFA nationality.

No.	Pos.	Nation	Player
—	DF	ALB	Hektor Idrizi (loan to Teuta Durrës)
—	MF	ALB	Jetmir Sefa (to Skënderbeu Korçë)
—	MF	ALB	Olsi Teqja (to Laçi)
—	DF	NGA	Felix Udoh (to Partizani)
—	FW	ALB	Fjodor Xhafa (end of career)
—	MF	NGA	John Huan (to (Nigeria) Enyimba)
—	FW	ALB	Klodian Arbëri (to Luftëtari Gjirokastër)
—	MF	ALB	Erald Kolgega (to Himarë)
—	DF	ALB	Orgest Buzi (to Himarë)
—	DF	NGA	Adebayo Adigun
—	MF	ALB	Besmir Arifaj (to Dinamo Tirana)
—	FW	NGA	Olalekan Bola
—	FW	NGA	Peter Olayinka (to (Cyprus) Yenicami Ağdelen)

=== Flamurtari Vlorë ===
In: Note: Flags indicate national team as defined under FIFA eligibility rules; some limited exceptions apply. Players may hold more than one non-FIFA nationality.

No.	Pos.	Nation	Player
1	GK	ALB	Shpëtim Moçka (from Kastrioti Krujë)
2	DF	ALB	Artan Sakaj (from Teuta Durrës)
5	DF	ALB	Erjon Dushku (from Tirana)
6	DF	ALB	Halim Begaj (from Vllaznia Shkodër)
7	FW	ALB	Ardit Shehaj (from Kastrioti Krujë)
13	DF	ALB	Orjand Beqiri (from Luftëtari Gjirokastër)
23	FW	ALB	Arber Abilaliaj (from Tirana)
25	DF	ALB	Andi Hasani (from Flamurtari Vlorë U-19)
26	FW	ALB	Lorenc Shehaj (from Flamurtari Vlorë U-19)
—	FW	ALB	Ardit Hoxha (from Flamurtari Vlorë U-19)
—	MF	ALB	Dejvi Bregu (from Flamurtari Vlorë U-19)
—	DF	ALB	Aleksander Brozi (from Flamurtari Vlorë U-19)
—	MF	ALB	Ergys Kuci (from Flamurtari Vlorë U-19)
—	DF	ALB	Armandi Myrtaj (Free agent)

Out: Note: Flags indicate national team as defined under FIFA eligibility rules; some limited exceptions apply. Players may hold more than one non-FIFA nationality.

No.	Pos.	Nation	Player
—	MF	ARG	Rafael Sosa
—	FW	ALB	Migen Memelli (to (Saudi Arabia) Al-Faisaly)
—	DF	MKD	Vlade Lazarevski
—	GK	ALB	Enea Koliqi (to (Greece) Iraklis)
—	MF	CRO	Toni Pezo (to (Bosnia and Herzegovina) Zrinjski Mostar)
—	MF	ALB	Gjergji Muzaka (to Skënderbeu Korçë)
—	MF	CRO	Davor Bratić (to Kukësi)
—	MF	MNE	Petar Vukučević (to (Montenegro) Grbalj)
—	DF	MNE	Blažo Rajović (to Vllaznia Shkodër)

=== Kastrioti ===
In: Note: Flags indicate national team as defined under FIFA eligibility rules; some limited exceptions apply. Players may hold more than one non-FIFA nationality.

No.	Pos.	Nation	Player
1	GK	MKD	Ilče Petrovski (from (North Macedonia) Pelister Bitola)
3	MF	ALB	Leudan Goga (from Kastrioti Krujë U-19)
6	DF	ALB	Elton Doku (from Laçi)
8	MF	ALB	Jetmir Sefa (from Skënderbeu Korçë)
10	FW	ALB	Enco Malindi (from Kukësi)
12	GK	ALB	Ilion Lika (from Tirana)
13	DF	ALB	Nertil Ferraj (from Tirana)
15	DF	NGA	Abraham Alechenwu (from Besa Kavajë)
16	FW	ALB	Guuido Tepshi (from Teuta Durrës)
17	DF	ALB	Arjan Sheta (from Teuta Durrës)
21	MF	ALB	Elton Muçollari (from Tirana)
32	GK	ALB	Princ Cali (from Tirana U-19)
—	MF	ALB	Eni Caca (from Kastrioti Krujë U-19)
—	FW	ALB	Eleandro Pema (from Tirana)
—	MF	ALB	Orjand Abazaj (from Partizani Tirana)
—	DF	BRA	Denis da Silva (from Unemployed)
—	MF	ALB	Spartak Elmazi (from Tomori Berat)
—	MF	BRA	Cate Fonseca (from Luftëtari Gjirokastër)

Out: Note: Flags indicate national team as defined under FIFA eligibility rules; some limited exceptions apply. Players may hold more than one non-FIFA nationality.

No.	Pos.	Nation	Player
—	GK	ALB	Alfred Osmani (to Teuta Durrës)
—	FW	ALB	Ardit Shehaj (to Flamurtari Vlorë)
—	MF	ALB	Olsi Gocaj (to Vllaznia Shkodër)
—	DF	ALB	Arsen Sykaj (to Vllaznia Shkodër)
—	DF	ALB	Arberi Bitincka (to Dinamo Tirana)
—	GK	ALB	Shpëtim Moçka (to Flamurtari Vlorë)
—	DF	ALB	Renaldo Kalari (to Tirana)
—	FW	FRA	Archi Fataki (to Lushnja)
—	FW	ALB	Eduart Tanushaj (to Pogradeci)
—	FW	ALB	Vilfor Hysa (to Kukësi)
—	FW	ALB	Semiran Cela (to Lushnja)
—	DF	ALB	Redi Pengili (to Adriatiku Mamurrasi)

=== Kukësi ===
In: Note: Flags indicate national team as defined under FIFA eligibility rules; some limited exceptions apply. Players may hold more than one non-FIFA nationality.

No.	Pos.	Nation	Player
2	DF	ALB	Dritan Smajli (from Vllaznia Shkodër)
4	DF	ALB	Ylli Shameti (from Luftëtari Gjirokastër)
11	FW	ALB	Vilfor Hysa (from Kastrioti Krujë)
12	GK	ALB	Kushtrim Abdullahi (from Gramshi)
18	FW	ALB	Fatjon Bytyçi (from Kukësi U-19)
25	FW	ALB	Sokol Cikalleshi (from Besa Kavajë)
—	MF	ALB	Erando Karabeci (loan from Tirana)
—	MF	ROU	Cristian Drăgoi (from (Canada) Windsor Border Stars)
—	MF	CRO	Davor Bratić (from Flamurtari Vlorë)
—	DF	ALB	Antonio Marku (from Vllaznia Shkodër)
—	DF	ALB	Elvis Prençi (from Partizani Tirana)

Out: Note: Flags indicate national team as defined under FIFA eligibility rules; some limited exceptions apply. Players may hold more than one non-FIFA nationality.

No.	Pos.	Nation	Player
—	MF	CRO	Luko Biskup
—	FW	GNB	Inzaghi Donígio
—	FW	ALB	Serxhio Abdurahmani (to (Greece) Vyzas)
—	DF	ALB	Elton Grami
—	FW	ITA	Matteo Prandelli (to (Italy) Castellana)
—	DF	ALB	Elvis Prençi (to Partizani Tirana)
—	DF	ALB	Roland Peqini (to Tirana)
—	MF	ALB	Erando Karabeci (loan return to Tirana)
—	FW	ALB	Enco Malindi (to Kastrioti Krujë)
—	DF	ALB	Vilson Lila (to Tërbuni Pukë)
—	MF	ALB	Sokol Mziu (to Tërbuni Pukë)

=== Laçi ===
In: Note: Flags indicate national team as defined under FIFA eligibility rules; some limited exceptions apply. Players may hold more than one non-FIFA nationality.

No.	Pos.	Nation	Player

Out: Note: Flags indicate national team as defined under FIFA eligibility rules; some limited exceptions apply. Players may hold more than one non-FIFA nationality.

No.	Pos.	Nation	Player

=== Lushnja ===
In: Note: Flags indicate national team as defined under FIFA eligibility rules; some limited exceptions apply. Players may hold more than one non-FIFA nationality.

No.	Pos.	Nation	Player

Out: Note: Flags indicate national team as defined under FIFA eligibility rules; some limited exceptions apply. Players may hold more than one non-FIFA nationality.

No.	Pos.	Nation	Player

=== Partizani Tirana ===
In: Note: Flags indicate national team as defined under FIFA eligibility rules; some limited exceptions apply. Players may hold more than one non-FIFA nationality.

No.	Pos.	Nation	Player

Out: Note: Flags indicate national team as defined under FIFA eligibility rules; some limited exceptions apply. Players may hold more than one non-FIFA nationality.

No.	Pos.	Nation	Player

=== Skënderbeu Korçë ===
In: Note: Flags indicate national team as defined under FIFA eligibility rules; some limited exceptions apply. Players may hold more than one non-FIFA nationality.

No.	Pos.	Nation	Player

Out: Note: Flags indicate national team as defined under FIFA eligibility rules; some limited exceptions apply. Players may hold more than one non-FIFA nationality.

No.	Pos.	Nation	Player

=== Teuta Durrës ===
In: Note: Flags indicate national team as defined under FIFA eligibility rules; some limited exceptions apply. Players may hold more than one non-FIFA nationality.

No.	Pos.	Nation	Player

Out: Note: Flags indicate national team as defined under FIFA eligibility rules; some limited exceptions apply. Players may hold more than one non-FIFA nationality.

No.	Pos.	Nation	Player

=== Tirana ===
In: Note: Flags indicate national team as defined under FIFA eligibility rules; some limited exceptions apply. Players may hold more than one non-FIFA nationality.

No.	Pos.	Nation	Player

Out: Note: Flags indicate national team as defined under FIFA eligibility rules; some limited exceptions apply. Players may hold more than one non-FIFA nationality.

No.	Pos.	Nation	Player

=== Vllaznia Shkodër ===
In: Note: Flags indicate national team as defined under FIFA eligibility rules; some limited exceptions apply. Players may hold more than one non-FIFA nationality.

No.	Pos.	Nation	Player

Out: Note: Flags indicate national team as defined under FIFA eligibility rules; some limited exceptions apply. Players may hold more than one non-FIFA nationality.

No.	Pos.	Nation	Player
