= Agustín González =

Agustín González may refer to:

- Agustín González de Amezúa y Mayo (1881–1956), Spanish scientist and Carlist activist
- Agustín González (actor) (1930–2005), Spanish actor
- Agustín González (footballer, born 1983), Argentine football midfielder
- Agustín González (footballer, born 1997), Uruguayan football midfielder
