= Jorge Casanova =

Jorge Casanova may refer to:

- Jorge Casanova (footballer, born 1976), Uruguayan football midfielder and manager
- Jorge Casanova (footballer, born 1984), Venezuelan football midfielder
