= Baci (disambiguation) =

Baci is a traditional Lao ceremony used to celebrate important events and occasions.

Baci or BACI may also refer to:

- Baci, a chocolate product of the Italian confectionery company Perugina
- Alis Baci, an Albanian football player
- Before-After-Control-Impact, an experiment design commonly used to monitor potential environmental impacts
