= Abazaj =

Abazaj is a surname. Notable people with the surname include:

- Eduard Abazaj (born 1963), Albanian football defender
- Kristal Abazaj (born 1996), Albanian football winger
- Oriand Abazaj (born 1985), Albanian football midfielder
