= KF Olimpic =

Albanian football club

- Founded: 2002; 23 years ago
- Ground: Olimpiku Stadium
- Capacity: 1,500
- Manager: Jan Dragne

KF Olimpic was an Albanian football club which was based in Yrshek, Kashar in Tirana County. The club was founded in 2002 and was previously called KF Olimpiku Tirana. The club dissolved in 2015.

== Players ==
=== Notable former players ===
This is a list of KF Olimpic players with senior national team appearances:

1. (Albania) Keidi Bare
2. (Albania) Redi Jupi
3. (Albania) Blerim Kotobelli
4. (Albania) Arjan Peço
5. (Albania) Gentian Selmani
6. (Albania) Juljan Shehu
7. (Chameria) Marko Çema

== Affiliated clubs ==
- (Greece) Ionikos FC
