= Patrik Bordon =

Slovenian footballer (born 1988)

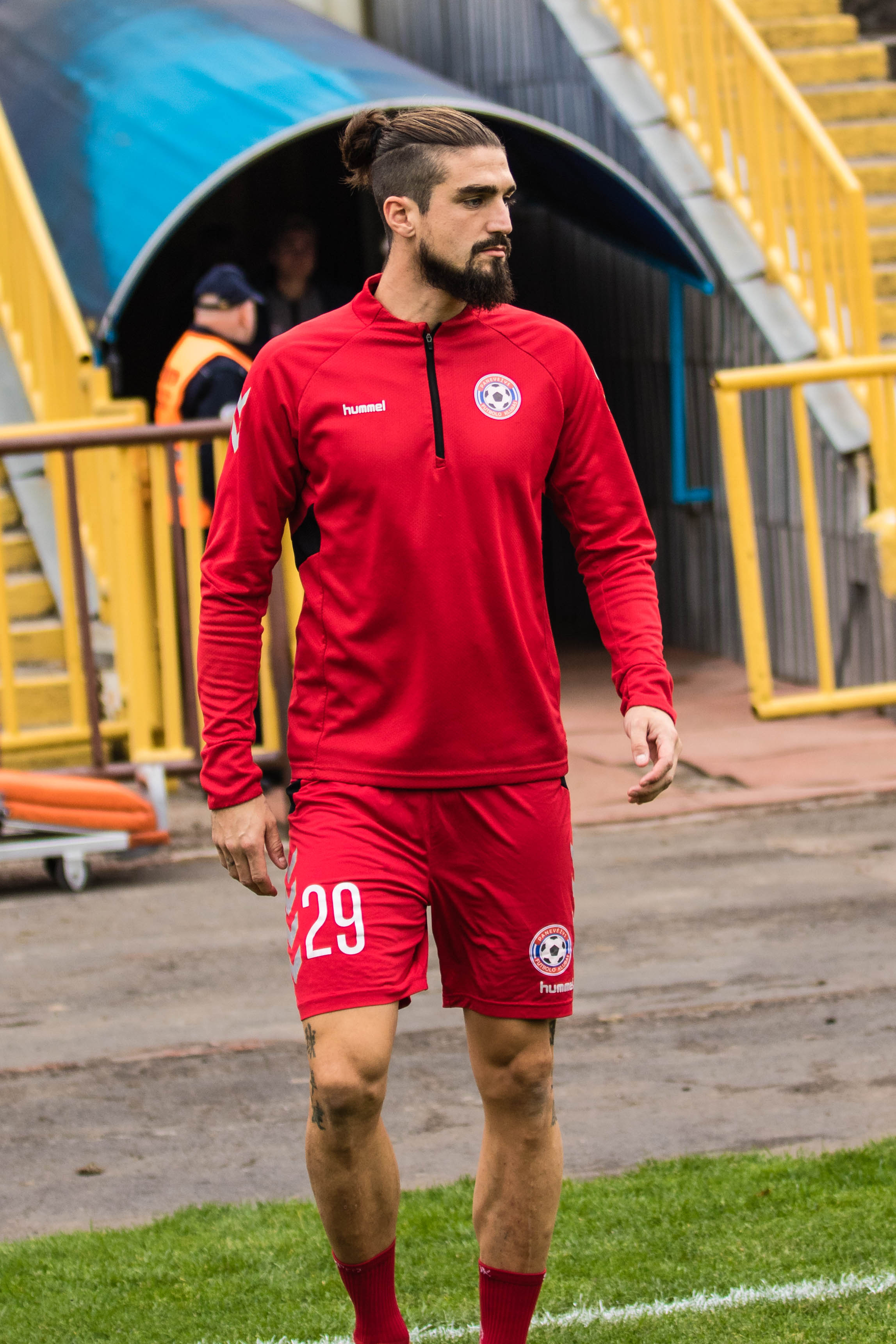

Personal information
- Date of birth: 6 April 1988 (age 38)
- Place of birth: Koper, SFR Yugoslavia
- Height: 1.94 m (6 ft 4 in)
- Position: Forward

Youth career
- –2006: Koper
- 2007: Lecce

Senior career*
| Years | Team | Apps | (Gls) |
| 2006–2007 | Koper | 17 | (3) |
| 2007–2009 | Lecce | 0 | (0) |
| 2008–2009 | → Koper (loan) | 12 | (0) |
| 2009 | Tabor Sežana | | |
| 2010 | Drava Ptuj | 4 | (0) |
| 2010 | Sanluri Calcio | | |
| 2011 | Follo | 1 | (0) |
| 2012 | Ankaran Hrvatini | 13 | (5) |
| 2012–2013 | Bela Krajina | 19 | (2) |
| 2013–2014 | Partizani Tirana | 9 | (0) |
| 2014 | Bylis Ballsh | 5 | (0) |
| 2014–2015 | Kras Repen | 10 | (0) |
| 2015–2016 | Ankaran Hrvatini | 11 | (6) |
| 2016 | Jedinstvo Bihać | 7 | (1) |
| 2016–2018 | ENAD Polis | 25 | (5) |
| 2018–2019 | Ankaran Hrvatini | 35 | (7) |
| 2019 | Panevėžys | 13 | (6) |
| 2020 | Persik Kediri | 0 | (0) |
| 2021–2022 | Tre Fiori | 8 | (4) |
| 2022 | Dekani | 7 | (1) |
| 2022 | Akhaa Ahli | 6 | (0) |
| 2023 | Chieti | 7 | (0) |
| 2024 | San Luca | 0 | (0) |

International career
| 2004 | Slovenia U17 | 2 | (0) |
| 2006 | Slovenia U18 | 1 | (0) |
| 2008 | Slovenia U20 | 1 | (0) |
- * Club domestic league appearances and goals as of 5 January 2024

Patrick Bordon (born 6 April 1988) is a Slovenian professional footballer who plays as a forward for Italian Serie D club San Luca.

== Club career ==
=== Partizani Tirana ===
On 30 August 2013, Bordon joined the newly promoted Albanian Superliga side Partizani Tirana on a one-year deal, taking the vacant squad number 9. After some matches in bench, he made his competitive debut on 2 October 2013 in the matchday 6 against Kukësi, replacing Aldo Mitraj for the final 13 minutes as Partizani won 1–0. On 6 November 2013, Bordon made his Albanian Cup debut by playing in the second leg of first round against Ada Velipojë, scoring a brace in an eventual 3–1 home win, 4–2 on aggregate, which ensured Partizani progression to the next round. He later terminated his contract with the club during the winter transfer window.
