= Arlind Pirani =

Albanian footballer

Personal information
- Full name: Arlind Pirani
- Date of birth: 26 October 1990 (age 36)
- Place of birth: Shkodër, Albania
- Position: Striker

Youth career
- –2009: Vllaznia Shkodër

Senior career*
Years	Team	Apps	(Gls)
2007–2009	Vllaznia	1	(0)
2009–2010	Mamurrasi		
2010–2011	Tërbuni	2	(0)
2011	Liria Prizren		
2012–2015	Burreli	73	(20)
- * Club domestic league appearances and goals

Arlind Pirani (born 26 October 1990 in Shkodër) is an Albanian footballer who most recently played as a striker for KS Burreli in the Albanian First Division.

== Club career ==
He started his career at hometown club Vllaznia and after playing for unfashionable sides Mamurrasi and Tërbuni as well as a spell in Kosovo, Pirani ended up with Burreli in 2012.
