= Behar Maliqi =

Kosovar footballer

Personal information
- Full name: Behar Maliqi
- Date of birth: 22 September 1986 (age 40)
- Place of birth: Pristina, SFR Yugoslavia
- Height: 1.86 m (6 ft 1 in)
- Position: Defensive midfielder

Youth career
- 2000–2001: Prishtina
- 2001–2004: Aeroporti FC

Senior career*
Years	Team	Apps	(Gls)
2004–2006	Fushë Kosova	28	(3)
2006–2007	KEK	20	(3)
2007–2008	Fushë Kosova	22	(5)
2008–2013	Prishtina	90	(15)
2013–2014	Partizani	12	(1)
2014–2018	Feronikeli	44	(22)
2018–2020	Llapi	56	(7)
2020–2021	Prishtina	11	(0)
2021–2022	Feronikeli	16	(0)
2022–2023	Malisheva	41	(3)
2023–2024	Feronikeli	4	(0)
Total		344	(59)

International career
2008	Kosovo	3	(0)
- * Club domestic league appearances and goals as of 1 June 2024

Behar Maliqi (born 22 September 1986) is a Kosovar former footballer who played as a defensive midfielder. He joined Partizani in 2013. He announced his retirement in May 2024.
