= Erind Selimaj =

Albanian footballer

Personal information
- Full name: Erind Selimaj
- Date of birth: 22 May 1989 (age 37)
- Place of birth: Shkodër, Albania
- Height: 1.88 m (6 ft 2 in)
- Position: Goalkeeper

Team information
- Current team: Flamurtari Pristina
- Number: 1

Youth career
- Vllaznia Shkodër

Senior career*
Years	Team	Apps	(Gls)
2008–2011	Tërbuni	60	(0)
2011–2012	Luftëtari	41	(0)
2012–2013	Ada	13	(0)
2013–2019	Vllaznia	64	(0)
2019–	Flamurtari Pristina	7	(0)
- * Club domestic league appearances and goals as of 16:06, 28 November 2019 (UTC)

Erind Selimaj (born 22 May 1989 in Shkodër) is an Albanian football player who plays for Flamurtari Pristina in the Football Superleague of Kosovo.

== Club career ==
Selimaj joined Kosovan side Flamurtari from Vllaznia in summer 2019.
