= Labinot Ibrahimi =

Kosovan footballer (born 1986)

Personal information
- Date of birth: 25 June 1986 (age 40)
- Place of birth: Pristina, SFR Yugoslavia
- Height: 1.89 m (6 ft 2 in)
- Position: Centre-back

Team information
- Current team: Vjosa

Youth career
- 2000–2005: Prishtina

Senior career*
Years	Team	Apps	(Gls)
2005–2013	Prishtina	144	(5)
2013–2019	Partizani	152	(6)
2019–2020	Prishtina	20	(0)
2020–2022	Arbëria	27	(1)
2022	Malisheva	6	(0)
2022–2023	Feronikeli		
2023–2024	Ulpiana		
2024–2026	Trepça	+21	(+1)
2026–	Vjosa		
- * Club domestic league appearances and goals as of 20 April 2025

Labinot Ibrahimi (born 25 June 1986) is a Kosovan professional footballer who plays as a centre-back for Vjosa.

== Career ==
=== Trepça ===
On June 10, 2024, Ibrahimi signed for Trepça of the First Football League of Kosovo in Group A.

== Honours ==
Prishtina

- Kosovo Superleague: 2007–08, 2008–09

Partizani Tirana

- Kategoria Superiore: 2018–19

Feronikeli

- First League of Kosovo (1): 2022–23

== Personal life ==
On 5 November 2015, Ibrahimi became a father for the first time when his wife Donjeta gave birth to the couple's first daughter, named Jara.
