= Klodian Melani =

Albanian footballer

Personal information
- Full name: Klodian Melani
- Date of birth: 15 May 1986 (age 40)
- Place of birth: Dibër, Albania
- Position: Defender

Team information
- Current team: Partizani Tirana B
- Number: 4

Senior career*
Years	Team	Apps	(Gls)
2008	Naftëtari		
2009	Turbina		
2012–2013	Burreli	33	(0)
2013–2014	Iliria	9	(1)
2015–2016	Korabi	21	(0)
2016–2017	Egnatia		
2017	Vora		
2018	Egnatia	12	(1)
2018–2019	Erzeni	16	(1)
2019–2020	Burreli	12	(1)
2020–	Partizani Tirana B	7	(0)
- * Club domestic league appearances and goals as of 2016

Klodian Melani (born 15 May 1986) is an Albanian footballer who plays as a defender for Partizani Tirana B in the Albanian First Division.
