= Márcio Sampaio =

Portuguese football coach

Personal information
- Full name: Márcio de Jesus Sampaio Venceslau
- Date of birth: 1 March 1979 (age 47)
- Place of birth: Almeirim, Portugal

Managerial career
- Years: Team
- 2014: Partizani (interim)
- 2014: Partizani

Márcio Sampaio (born 1 March 1979) is a Portuguese football coach.

== Career ==
Sampaio began his career at semi professional side CD Boliqueime in 2004 where he was part of the coaching staff, before receiving an invitation to join the coaching staff of F.C. Ferreiras three months later. After the club was promoted to the Terceira Divisão he fell out with the director over wages and soon left to join Silves, where he remained until they were relegated from the Segunda Divisão. He then join the coaching staff at the Olhanense youth team in 2006, where he remained for a year and a half before being invited to join the coaching setup of the senior side. In 2008, he joined Primeira Liga side Braga as a strength and condition coach, before going on to join Swiss side Servette FC in January 2010 as a fitness, strength and condition coach, where he remained for 6 months before leaving for the United Arab Emirates to join Al-Sharjah SCC in the same capacity. He left Al-Sharjah in May 2011 to return to Portugal, where he became the fitness coach of União de Leiria in October 2011, before joining Sporting Clube de Portugal as a fitness coach in July 2012 for a year. In the summer of 2013 he became the fitness coach of Albanian Superliga side Partizani Tirana, where in January 2014 he became the interim and then permanent head coach until the end of the season. Shortly after leaving Partizani, he joined Egyptian side Zamalek SC as a fitness coach and he win the Egypt championship and the Supercup, before moving to Saudi Arabian side Al-Shabab FC. In June 2015 he returned to Sporting Clube de Portugal once again as a fitness coach and win the Portuguese SuperCup against Benfica Lisbon. In January 2018, won the Portuguese League Cup with Sporting Clube de Portugal. In 20 of May, he was in the final of Portugal Cup and they lost this trophy against Desportivo das Aves. After this sporting season, he signed for Al Hilal of Saudi Arabia in the 2018/2019 season, where he won a Super Cup, against Al Ittihad de Jedah in a match that took place in London.The Almeirim-born Coach, after Al Hilal from Saudi Arabia, embarks with Coach Jorge Jesus, to Brazil, where they represented CR Flamengo, winning everything there was to win. They won 5 titles, including Libertadores da America, Supercup and Recopa Sul Americana and Estadual Championship. In addition to the National and State In 2020, they signed a 2-year contract with Sport Lisboa e Benfica, playing in the Champions League, where they beat Barcelona 3-0 and with that they passed the group stage, in a difficult group where Bayern Munich and Dinamo de Kiev too.

He is currently the fitness coach for Saudi Pro League club Al-Nassr.
