= Emir Ujkani =

Kosovar footballer

Personal information
- Full name: Emir Ujkani
- Date of birth: 17 August 1985 (age 41)
- Place of birth: Resnik, Vushtrri, SFR Yugoslavia
- Height: 1.87 m (6 ft 2 in)
- Position: Defender

Youth career
- FC Tielti
- KSV Ingelmunster

Senior career*
Years	Team	Apps	(Gls)
2001–2003	Ingelmunster		
2003–2005	SW Ingelmunster-Harelbeke		
2005–2006	Lauwe		
2006–2008	Kortrijk		
2008–2009	Bylis	4	(0)
2009–2011	Wielsbeke	12	(1)
2011–2013	Brindisi	3	(0)
2014	Sint-Niklaas	10	(0)
- * Club domestic league appearances and goals

Emir Ujkani (born 17 August 1985 in Resnik, Vushtrri) is a Kosovar retired football goalkeeper.

== Club career ==
=== Early life ===
Ujkani was born in Resnik, a village near Vushtrri, SFR Yugoslavia, before moving to Belgium along with his family in November 1994.

In 2011, Ujkani moved to Italy to play for Brindisi.

== Personal life ==
He is the older brother of former Albania international Samir Ujkani. In 2015, Emir was arrested for attempted manslaughter in Brussels.
