= Arber Malaj =

Albanian footballer

Personal information
- Date of birth: 11 April 1989 (age 37)
- Place of birth: Albania
- Height: 1.87 m (6 ft 2 in)
- Position: Defender

Senior career*
Years	Team	Apps	(Gls)
2007–2009	Flamurtari	14	(0)
2009–2010	Kamza	4	(1)
2010–2011	Kastrioti	12	(0)
2011	Kamza	0	(0)
2011–2012	Bylis	1	(0)
2012–2014	Mamurrasi	20	(2)
2014	Butrinti	7	(0)
2015	Sopoti	8	(0)

International career
2006	Albania U17	3	(0)
2010–	Albania U21	1	(0)
- * Club domestic league appearances and goals

Arbër Malaj (born 11 April 1989) is an Albanian former professional footballer who played as a defender.
