= Mevlan Murati =

Macedonian footballer

Personal information
- Full name: Mevlan Murati
- Date of birth: 5 March 1994 (age 32)
- Place of birth: Tetovo, Macedonia
- Height: 1.71 m (5 ft 7 in)
- Position: Full-back

Team information
- Current team: Shkendija
- Number: 16

Youth career
- –2012: Shkendija

Senior career*
Years	Team	Apps	(Gls)
2012–2023	Shkendija	164	(2)
2013–2014	→ Partizani (loan)	26	(0)
2015–2016	→ Shkupi (loan)	29	(0)
2022	→ Renova (loan)	13	(0)
2023–2024	Rabotnički	19	(1)
2024–2025	Gostivar	14	(0)
2025–	Shkendija	14	(0)

International career^{‡}
2009–2011	Macedonia U17	13	(0)
2012–2014	Macedonia U19	7	(0)
2014	Albania U21	2	(0)
2015–2017	Macedonia U21	12	(0)
- * Club domestic league appearances and goals as of 18 June 2026 ‡ National team caps and goals as of 17 August 2018

Mevlan Murati (Macedonian: Мевљан Мурати; born 5 March 1994) is a Macedonian professional footballer who plays for Shkendija.

== International career ==
In April 2014 he received his Albanian citizenship through his ethnicity, and later that month he was called up to the Albanian under-21 national team for a friendly tournament in May which took place in Italy. Eventually he decided to drop Albania U-21 and to play for Macedonia U-21 with whom he managed to win a historic qualification to the 2017 UEFA European Under-21 Championship in Poland.
