= Klodian Skënderi =

Albanian footballer

Personal information
- Full name: Klodian Skënderi
- Date of birth: 12 January 1984 (age 42)
- Place of birth: Albania
- Position: Midfielder

Senior career*
Years	Team	Apps	(Gls)
2003–2008	Flamurtari		
2008–2009	Apolonia	5	(0)
2009–2010	Vlora		
- * Club domestic league appearances and goals as of 23 May 2009 ‡ National team caps and goals as of 23 May 2009

Klodian Skënderi (born 12 January 1984) is an Albanian retired football player. The midfielder played in the Albanian Superliga for Apolonia Fier.
