= Alert Alçani =

Albanian footballer and coach

Alert Alcani
Personal information
- Date of birth: 12 October 1980 (age 46)
- Place of birth: Lezhë, Albania
- Position: Defender

Team information
- Current team: Erzeni (manager)

Senior career*
| Years | Team | Apps | (Gls) |
| 1998–2002 | Besëlidhja | | |
| 2002–2003 | Vllaznia | | |
| 2003 | Gloria Bistrița | | |
| 2004–2005 | Partizani | | |
| 2005–2006 | Vllaznia | | |
| 2006–2008 | Besëlidhja | | |
| 2008 | Teuta | | |
| 2008–2009 | Skënderbeu | | |
| 2009 | Besëlidhja | | |
| 2009–2010 | Lushnja | | |
| 2010–2011 | Besëlidhja | | |
| 2011–2013 | Partizani | | |

Managerial career
- 2014–2015: Kastrioti
- 2016–2017: Shënkolli
- 2018: Shënkolli
- 2019–2020: Burreli
- 2021–2022: Burreli
- 2022–2023: Tërbuni Pukë
- 2023: Besëlidhja
- 2025–: Erzeni
- * Club domestic league appearances and goals

Alert Alçani (born 12 October 1980) is an Albanian football coach and retired football player.

He played as a defender for Partizani Tirana in the Albanian First Division.

He started managing in 2014.
