= Predrag Mirčeta =

Serbian footballer

Personal information
- Full name: Predrag Mirčeta
- Date of birth: 2 February 1984 (age 42)
- Place of birth: Belgrade, SFR Yugoslavia
- Height: 1.85 m (6 ft 1 in)
- Position: Defensive midfielder

Senior career*
| Years | Team | Apps | (Gls) |
| 2002–2004 | Grafičar Beograd | | |
| 2004–2005 | Jedinstvo Surčin | 2 | (0) |
| 2005–2007 | FC Oslip | | |
| 2007–2009 | Hajduk Beograd | 10 | (0) |
| 2008–2009 | → Apolonia Fier (loan) | 21 | (1) |
| 2009 | Zmaj Zemun | | |
| 2009 | Aias Salamina | | |
| 2010 | Vecsés | 3 | (0) |
| 2011 | Dinamo Vranje | 13 | (0) |
| 2011 | Balkan Beograd | 10 | (0) |
| 2012 | Mosta | 9 | (0) |
| 2012–2013 | Vujić Voda | | |
| 2013 | Sloga Bajina Bašta | | |
| 2014 | Żejtun Corinthians | | |
| 2014–2018 | Brezovica | | |
- * Club domestic league appearances and goals

Predrag Mirčeta (Serbian Cyrillic: Предраг Мирчета; born 2 February 1984) is a Serbian footballer.

He had previously played with Serbian clubs RFK Grafičar Beograd, FK Jedinstvo Surčin, Austrian FC Oslip, back in Serbia with FK Hajduk Beograd, on loan at Albanian FK Apolonia Fier, Serbian FK Zmaj Zemun, Greek Aias Salamina F.C., Hungarian Vecsés, FK Dinamo Vranje and FK Balkan Mirijevo and Maltese Mosta.
