= Olimpiku Stadium =

- Location: Yrshek, Tirana, Albania
- Operator: Olimpic CF
- Capacity: 1,500
- Surface: Artificial grass
- Field size: 101m by 65m

Construction
- Renovated: 2011

Tenants
- Olimpic CF; Partizani Tirana (5 years)

Olimpiku Stadium (Albanian: Stadiumi Olimpiku) is a purpose-built stadium in Yrshek, Tirana, Albania. The stadium was reconstructed in 2011 with the investment coming from the club's president Kujtim Beqiri.
