= Ertan Demiri =

Macedonian footballer

Personal information
- Date of birth: 24 January 1979 (age 47)
- Place of birth: Skopje, SR Macedonia, SFR Yugoslavia
- Height: 1.83 m (6 ft 0 in)
- Position: Midfielder

Youth career
- 1995–1999: FK Sloga

Senior career*
Years	Team	Apps	(Gls)
1999–2004	Sloga Jugomagnat	78	(3)
2005–2007	Vardar	42	(2)
2007–2008	Rabotnicki	26	(0)
2008–2009	Lokeren	9	(0)
2009–2010	Metalurg	13	(0)
2010–2011	Al Taawon	8	(0)
2012	Teteks	9	(0)
2013	Shkëndija	34	(3)
2013–2014	Partizani	32	(3)

International career
2009	Macedonia	1	(0)
- * Club domestic league appearances and goals

Ertan Demiri (Macedonian: Ертан Демири; born 24 January 1979) is a retired Macedonian footballer. He belongs to the ethnic Albanian minority in the country.

== Club career ==
=== Childhood and early career ===
Ertan Demiri was born in Saraj, Skopje, Socialist Federal Republic of Yugoslavia to Albanian Parents. Growing up in Saraj, Demiri enrolled into FK Sloga Jugomagnat, the football club based in Čair.

=== Career in Macedonia ===
Demiri stayed in Sloga Jugomagnat for five years, earning 78 appearances and scoring three times. during his stay, Demiri helped Sloga win the Macedonian First league. After his successful stint, Demiri left and joined Skopje's other club, FK Vardar.

While at Vardar, Demiri made 42 appearances and scored twice. At the end of the 2007 season, Demiri moved to crosstown rivals, FK Rabotnički.

Demiri stayed at Rabotnički for one season. He made 26 appearances and helped the team win both the Macedonian Cup and the Macedonian First league. Demiri was also a crucial member of the squad and made a significant impact on the team during the qualification period of the UEFA cup. He scored a goal against ND Gorica in the second leg of the pairing and an assist against HŠK Zrinjski Mostar. Demiri had a strong influence on match against English Premier league side, Bolton Wanderers F.C. Demiri's aggressive approach in defence and his pinpoint passing helped Rabotnički score against Bolton on the counter. After his season at FK Rabotnički, Demiri moved abroad to K.S.C. Lokeren

=== Lokeren ===
Demiri did not adjust well from the transition from the Macedonian league and the Belgian league, and did not gell into the team well. He made nine appearances and left the club in 2010 after one and a half years at the club.

=== Return to Macedonia ===
After making brief stints at Al Taawon and KS Bylis Ballsh, Demiri returned to the Macedonian league, joining FK Teteks.

=== Shkëndija ===
During the winter break of the 2011/2012 season, Demiri moved to crosstown rivals FK Shkëndija

=== FK Partizani Tirana ===
Demiri signed a two-year contract with Partizani Tirana during summer 2013. He made his debut with a goal against Kastrioti Krujë on 31 August 2013.

On 12 October 2013, in the first Tirana derby since 2009, Demiri scored the winner in the 57th minute after a mistake from the young goalkeeper Marsel Çaka.

== International career ==
Demiri has made one appearance for the Macedonian national team against Moldova in a February 2009 international friendly.

Demiri was an unused substitute for the Republic of Macedonia national football team in a 2010 FIFA World Cup qualifying match against Scotland on 6 September 2008.

== Honours ==
=== Club ===
Sloga Jugomagnat

- Macedonian First League: 2001

Rabotnički

- Macedonian First League: 2008
- Macedonian Cup: 2008
