= Joel Apezteguía =

Cuban footballer

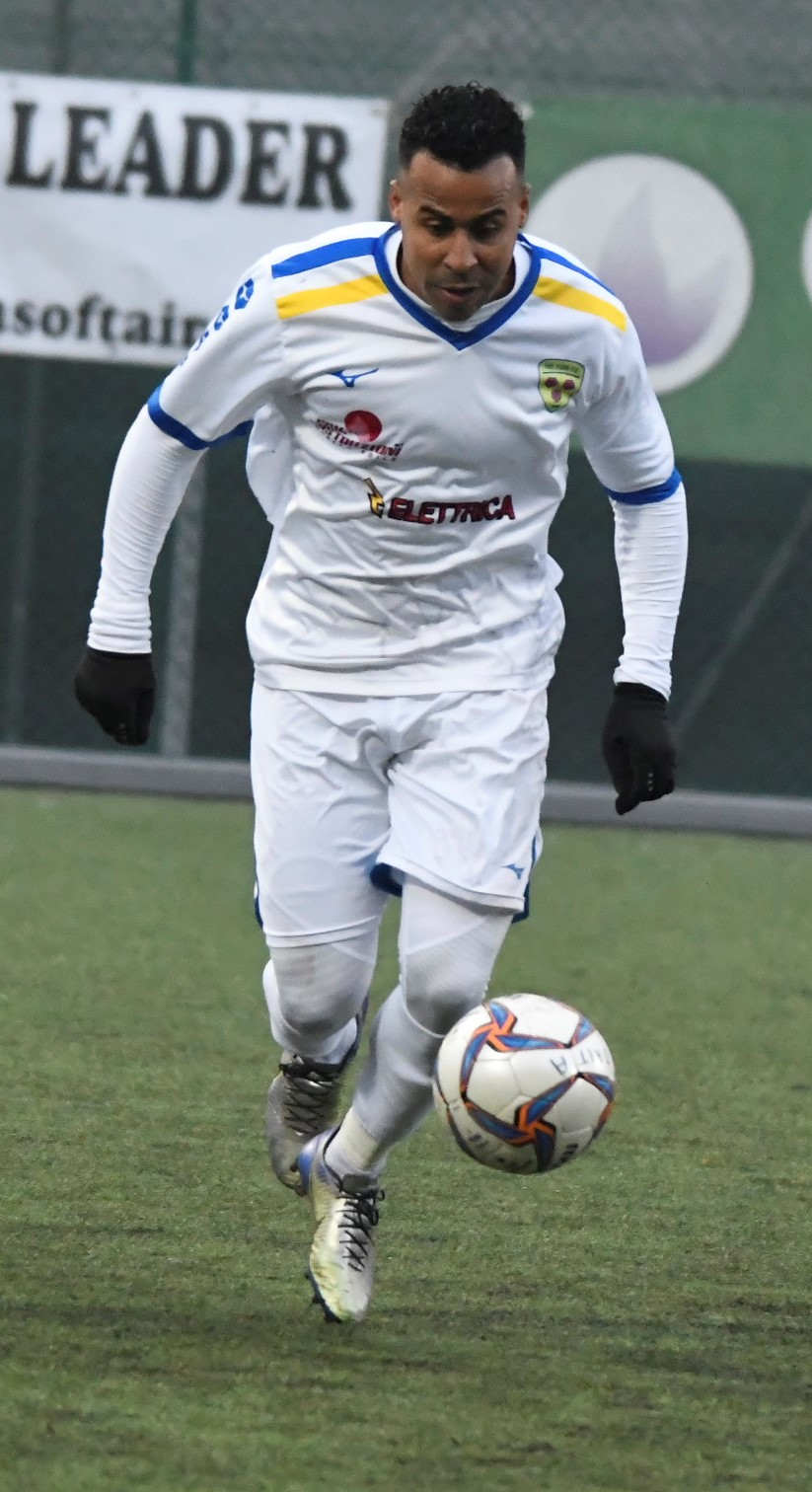
- Apezteguía playing for Tre Fiori in 2019

Personal information
- Full name: Joel Apezteguía Hijuelos
- Date of birth: 17 December 1983 (age 42)
- Place of birth: Plaza de la Revolución, Cuba
- Height: 1.83 m (6 ft 0 in)
- Position: Striker

Team information
- Current team: Tre Fiori
- Number: 11

Senior career*
Years	Team	Apps	(Gls)
–2008	Industriales	10	(19)
2008–2009	Manresa		
2009–2010	Nistru Otaci	2	(0)
2010–2011	Manresa	32	(15)
2011–2012	CF Ripollet	20	(10)
2013–2014	Teuta Durrës	15	(4)
2014–2015	Tre Fiori	1	(0)
2014–2015	Utiel	9	(4)
2016	Fano	3	(0)
2016–2017	Gassino	20	(31)
2017	Chisola	2	(0)
2017–2018	Ancona	20	(21)
2018–	Tre Fiori	40	(25)

International career^{‡}
2021–	Cuba	2	(0)
- * Club domestic league appearances and goals as of 7 March 2021 ‡ National team caps and goals as of 27 March 2021

Joel Apezteguía Hijuelos (born 17 December 1983) is a Cuban professional footballer who plays as a forward for Sammarinese team Tre Fiori.

== Club career ==
Apezteguía had spells in the Spanish lower leagues and played in Moldova for Nistru Otaci.

=== Teuta ===
He scored four goals in an Albanian Superliga game on 2 February 2014 against KS Lushnja which ended in a 6–2 win and lifted Teuta to second place. He added another three goals to his final tally in Albania in Cup games

=== CD Utiel ===
With CD Utiel he scored 7 goals. These were scored against Villarreal and Osasuna.

=== Tre Fiori ===
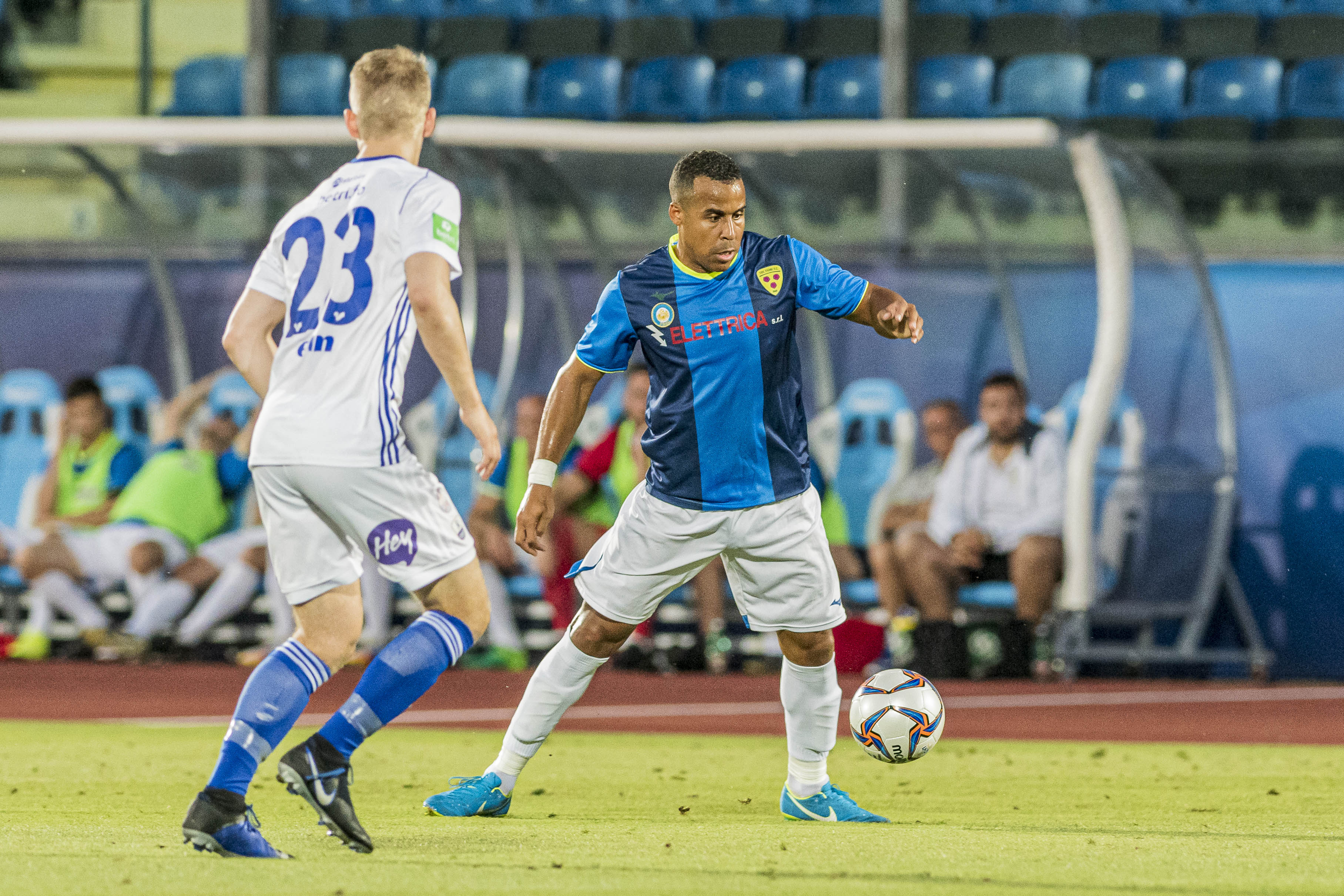

Apezteguía made his debut in the Europa League against KÍ Klaksvík, making history as the first Cuban to play in the Champions League.

== International career ==
He made his debut for Cuba national football team on 24 March 2021 in a World Cup qualifier against Guatemala.

== Honours ==
=== Club ===
Tre Fiori

- Coppa Titano: 2018–19
- San Marino Federal Trophy 2019–20
- San Marino Championship 2019–20
