= Andrelis Pashaj =

Albanian footballer

Personal information
- Date of birth: 11 March 1987 (age 39)
- Place of birth: Fier, Albania
- Position: Defender

Senior career*
Years	Team	Apps	(Gls)
2007–2008	Skënderbeu	27	(0)
2008–2011	Partizani	45	(3)
2011–2012	Kukësi	23	(2)
2012–2013	Partizani	17	(2)
2013	Luftëtari	12	(0)
2014	Dinamo Tirana	4	(0)
2015	Kastrioti	9	(0)
2015–2017	Sopoti	44	(0)
2017	Burreli	11	(0)
2018–2019	Turbina	30	(1)
- * Club domestic league appearances and goals as of 2 April 2015

Andrelis Pashaj (born 11 March 1987, in Fier) is an Albanian footballer who most recently played for Turbina Cërrik in the Albanian First Division.
