= Arbër Shytani =

Albanian footballer

Personal information
- Full name: Arbër Shytani
- Date of birth: 25 January 1985 (age 41)
- Place of birth: Shkodër, Albania
- Position: Defender

Youth career
- –2005: Vllaznia

Senior career*
Years	Team	Apps	(Gls)
2006–2008	Ada		(6)
2008–2009	Laçi	10	(0)
2009–2010	Ada	22	(3)
2010–2011	Tërbuni	10	(0)
2011–2017	Besëlidhja	56	(0)
2017–2018	Tërbuni	16	(0)
- * Club domestic league appearances and goals

Arbër Shytani (born 25 January 1985, in Shkodër) is an Albanian retired footballer who last played as a defender for Tërbuni Pukë in the Albanian First Division.
