= Aleksandar Srećković =

Serbian footballer

Personal information
- Full name: Aleksandar Srećković
- Date of birth: 25 June 1981 (age 45)
- Place of birth: Belgrade, SFR Yugoslavia
- Height: 1.80 m (5 ft 11 in)
- Position: Left back

Senior career*
Years	Team	Apps	(Gls)
2001–2002	Sinđelić Beograd		
2002–2003	Radnički Obrenovac	4	(0)
2003	Čukarički	9	(0)
2004	Beograd	12	(9)
2004	OFK Niš	16	(0)
2005	Mačva Šabac	32	(1)
2006	BASK	12	(0)
2006	CFR Timişoara		
2006–2008	Sevojno	36	(1)
2008–2009	Apolonia Fier	30	(1)
2009–2010	Beograd	12	(0)
2010	→ ČSK Čelarevo (loan)	15	(1)
2010–2011	Srem		
- * Club domestic league appearances and goals as of August 1, 2010 ‡ National team caps and goals as of August 1, 2010

Aleksandar Srećković (Serbian Cyrillic: Александар Срећковић; born 25 June 1981) is a Serbian retired football defender.

During his career, he had already played in the Serbian top league club FK Radnički Obrenovac, in Serbian lower league clubs FK Sinđelić Beograd, FK Čukarički, FK Beograd, OFK Niš, FK Mačva Šabac, FK BASK, FK Sevojno and FK ČSK Čelarevo, but also with Romanian club CFR Timişoara and Albanian FK Apolonia Fier.
