= Rigers Dushku =

Albanian footballer (born 1991)

Personal information
- Full name: Rigers Sami Dushku
- Date of birth: 8 September 1991 (age 35)
- Place of birth: Tirana, Albania
- Position: Attacking midfielder

Team information
- Current team: Tërbuni
- Number: 77

Youth career
- 2007–2009: Shkëndija Tirana
- 2009–2010: Partizani Tirana

Senior career*
Years	Team	Apps	(Gls)
2010–2011	Partizani	14	(4)
2011–2012	Besa	21	(3)
2012–2013	Apolonia	23	(3)
2013–2014	Partizani	15	(0)
2015	Kukësi	4	(0)
2015–2017	Flamurtari	27	(1)
2019-	Tërbuni	6	(2)
- * Club domestic league appearances and goals as of 7 December 2019

Rigers Dushku (born 8 September 1991) is an Albanian professional footballer who currently plays for Tërbuni Pukë in the Albanian First Division.
