= Klaudio Rexhepi =

Albanian footballer

Personal information
- Full name: Klaudio Rexhepi
- Date of birth: 24 May 1989 (age 37)
- Place of birth: Ersekë, Albania
- Height: 1.77 m (5 ft 10 in)
- Position: Defender

Youth career
- 2003–2006: Gramozi

Senior career*
Years	Team	Apps	(Gls)
2006–2011	Gramozi	50	(1)
2011–2012	Kukësi	28	(1)
2012–2017	Dinamo Tirana	126	(0)
2017–2019	Egnatia	42	(1)
2019–2020	Turbina	23	(0)
- * Club domestic league appearances and goals as of 10 October 2019

Klaudio Rexhepi (born 24 May 1989 in Ersekë) is an Albanian professional footballer who plays as a defender.

== Club career ==
Rexhepi scored his first-career goal on 28 April 2012 while representing FK Kukësi, scoring the third goal of his team in an eventual 3–4 away win against Besëlidhja Lezhë.

On 1 August 2012, he signed with Dinamo Tirana for an undisclosed fee, leaving Kukësi after just one season. He was also the target of Tërbuni Pukë.

== Honours ==
=== Club ===
FK Kukësi

- Albanian First Division: Runner-up 2011–12
