= Julian Malo =

Albanian footballer

Personal information
- Date of birth: 2 February 1987 (age 39)
- Place of birth: Tirana, Albania
- Height: 1.73 m (5 ft 8 in)
- Position: Striker

Youth career
- 2000–2007: Partizani

Senior career*
| Years | Team | Apps | (Gls) |
| 2007–2008 | Kamza | 20 | (5) |
| 2008–2009 | Teuta | 10 | (0) |
| 2009–2011 | Laçi | 10 | (2) |
| 2011–2013 | Kukësi | 34 | (14) |
| 2013–2014 | Partizani | 26 | (11) |
| 2014–2015 | Besëlidhja | 21 | (16) |
| 2015–2016 | Kastrioti | 24 | (11) |
| 2016–2017 | Shënkolli | 13 | (3) |
- * Club domestic league appearances and goals as of 1 June 2017

Julian Malo (born 2 February 1988) is an Albanian professional footballer who last played as a striker for Shënkolli in the Albanian First Division.

== Career ==
=== Partizani Tirana ===
On 30 January 2014, Malo left the club after realizing that there was no room for him in team, describing the decision as "the best for his career".

=== Besëlidhja Lezhë ===
Malo joined Albanian First Division side Besëlidhja Lezhë in August 2014 ahead of the 2014–15 season, where he signed a one-year contract and had hoped to help the club secure promotion to the Albanian Superliga. He made his debut for the club in the opening round of the Albanian First Division on 27 September 2014 in a 1–0 win over KS Burreli, and he scored his first goal for the club in the next league game, which was the only goal of an away game against Ada Velipojë.

=== Kastrioti Krujë ===
He joined an ambitious Kastrioti Krujë side ahead of the 2015–16 Albanian First Division season.

=== Shënkolli ===
On 9 September 2016, Malo joined newly promoted side Shënkolli on a one-year contract.
