= Arenc Dibra =

Albanian footballer (born 1990)

Personal information
- Date of birth: 11 May 1990 (age 36)
- Place of birth: Shkodër, Albania
- Height: 1.81 m (5 ft 11 1/2 in)
- Position: Attacking midfielder

Youth career
- 2000–2008: Vllaznia

Senior career*
Years	Team	Apps	(Gls)
2008–2015	Vllaznia	19	(2)
2008–2009	→ Tërbuni (loan)	18	(3)
2009–2010	→ Ada (loan)	12	(1)
2010–2011	→ Tërbuni (loan)	21	(5)
2011–2013	→ Besëlidhja (loan)	43	(7)
2013–2015	Vllaznia	32	(2)
2015	Besëlidhja	8	(2)
2016–2018	Vllaznia	25	(3)
2020–2021	Besëlidhja	16	(3)
2021–2022	Veleçiku Koplik		
- * Club domestic league appearances and goals as of 26 May 2021

Arenc Dibra (born 11 May 1990) was an Albanian football player.
