= Endri Dalipi =

Albanian professional footballer

Personal information
- Full name: Endri Dalipi
- Date of birth: 2 May 1983 (age 43)
- Place of birth: Elbasan, Albania
- Position: Attacking midfielder

Youth career
- Elbasani

Senior career*
Years	Team	Apps	(Gls)
2000–2005	Elbasani	79	(4)
2005–2006	Shkumbini	17	(0)
2006–2008	Elbasani	47	(3)
2008–2009	Bylis	20	(0)
2009–2015	Elbasani	127	(54)
- * Club domestic league appearances and goals as of 24 August 2014

Endri Dalipi (born 2 May 1983) is an Albanian professional footballer who currently plays for KF Elbasani in the Albanian Superliga.

== Honours ==
KF Elbasani

- Albanian First Division (1): 2013-14
