= Jorge Casanova (footballer, born 1984) =

Venezuelan soccer midfielder

Personal information
- Full name: Jorge Francisco Casanova Canchila
- Date of birth: July 6, 1984 (age 42)
- Place of birth: Caracas, Federal District, Venezuela
- Height: 1.78 m (5 ft 10 in)
- Position: Midfielder

Youth career
- Centro Italo Venezolano
- 2001–2004: Caracas FC

Senior career*
Years	Team	Apps	(Gls)
2004–2008	Caracas FC	95	(5)
2008	KF Elbasani	9	(3)
2009–2012	Deportivo Táchira	89	(4)
2011	Deportivo Petare	14	(3)
2013–2014	Atlético Venezuela	44	(0)
2014-2015	Metropolitanos	9	(1)

International career
1999	Venezuela U15		
2001	Venezuela U17		
2002	Venezuela U20		
- * Club domestic league appearances and goals

Jorge Francisco Casanova Canchila (born July 6, 1984) is a retired Venezuelan soccer midfielder.

== Biography ==
He Arrived in Caracas FC in 2001 to form part of the Youth Club, where he was three times Championship in the U-20 category in the years 2001–2002, 2002–2003 and 2003–2004.

His professional debut in the first Division was on January 9, 2005, in a match against Carabobo F.C., where he played about 71 minutes being the Man of Match for his good performance. Thereafter formed part of the senior team of Caracas FC which won two Championships of the Venezuelan Football League.

He also was the author of the first goal in the opening game of the stadium Cocodrilos Sport Park against Bolívar FC from Bolivia.

In the 2008 Casanova had his first experience abroad with the KF Elbasani of the first division of Albania, where he signed a contract for six months. During his internship in Europe, Jorge scored a hattrick in a game of the Albanian Cup.

In January 2009, Jorge returns to Venezuela where he sign a contract with Deportivo Táchira. Since his arrival at the black and yellow team, Jorge had an outstanding performance both the local tournament and the Copa Libertadores 2009, which earned him to extend his contract for two more years with Deportivo Táchira.

== Honours ==
- 4th. Place Southamerican U-17. (Perú, 2001)
- Three times Championship : Caracas Fútbol Club "Campeonato Nacional U-20". (2001–2002, 2002–2003, 2003–2004).
- Two times Championship : Caracas Fútbol Club "Campeonato Profesional de Fúbol Venezolano". (2005–2006, 2006–2007).
- 2nd. Place : Caracas Fútbol Club "Campeonato Profesional de Fútbol Venezolano". (2004–2005, 2007–2008).
- Copa Libertadores: 2005, 2006, 2008, 2009.
- Copa Panamericana Directv. Phoenix, Arizona. (EEUU, 2007).
- 2nd. Place : Deportivo Táchira "Torneo Clausura 2009".
- Champion : Deportivo Táchira "Torneo Apertura 2009".
- 2nd. Place : Deportivo Táchira "Campeonato Profesional de Fútbol Venezolano". (2009–2010)
- Champion : Deportivo Táchira "Torneo Apertura 2010".
- Champion : Deportivo Táchira "Campeonato Profesional de Fúbol Venezolano". (2010–2011)
- 3rd. Place : Deportivo Petare "Torneo Apertura 2011".
