= Olsi Gocaj =

Albanian footballer

Personal information
- Date of birth: 30 September 1989 (age 37)
- Place of birth: Shkodër, Albania
- Height: 1.80 m (5 ft 11 in)
- Position: Midfielder

Youth career
- 2000–2008: Vllaznia Shkodër

Senior career*
Years	Team	Apps	(Gls)
2007–2008	Vllaznia	1	(0)
2008–2010	Kastrioti	30+	(1+)
2010–2012	Vllaznia	51	(4)
2012–2013	Kastrioti	23	(3)
2013–2015	Vllaznia	55	(1)
2015–2016	Laçi	31	(3)
2016–2019	Vllaznia	92	(7)
2018	Vllaznia B	1	(1)
2019–2020	Flamurtari	26	(0)
2021–2022	Flamurtari	3	(0)

International career^{‡}
2009–2010	Albania U-21	4	(0)
- * Club domestic league appearances and goals as of 13 November 2022 ‡ National team caps and goals as of 2 November 2011

Olsi Gocaj (born 30 September 1989) is an Albanian footballer who plays as a midfielder.
