= Jozef Thana =

Albanian footballer

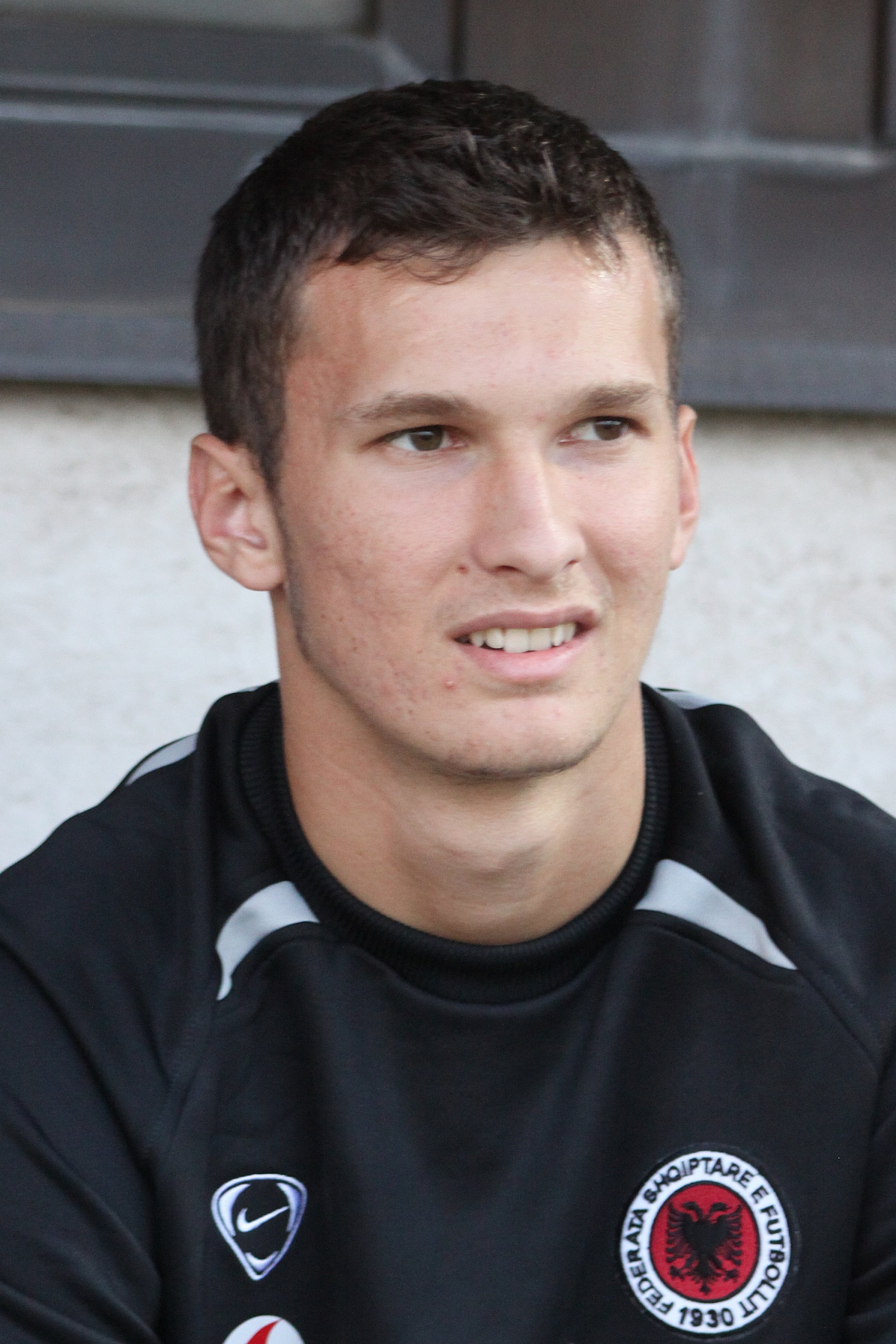
- Jozef Thana with Albania U-21s in 2009

Personal information
- Full name: Jozef Thana
- Date of birth: 14 February 1988 (age 38)
- Place of birth: Shkodër, Albania
- Height: 1.83 m (6 ft 0 in)
- Position: Centre midfielder

Youth career
- Olimpik Tirana

Senior career*
Years	Team	Apps	(Gls)
2007–2008	Skënderbeu	23	(3)
2008–2009	Elbasani	5	(0)
2009–2010	Teuta	7	(0)
2010–2011	Partizani	20	(4)
2011–2012	Kukësi	23	(3)
2012–2013	Partizani	30	(2)
2014	Laçi	5	(0)
2014–2016	Dinamo Tirana	40	(4)
2016–?	Shënkolli		

International career
2008–2009	Albania U-21	4	(0)
- * Club domestic league appearances and goals as of 26 February 2014

Jozef Thana (born 14 February 1988 in Shkodër) is an Albanian professional footballer who most recently played for Shënkolli in the Albanian First Division.
