= Salvador Sulçe =

Albanian footballer

Salvador Sulce
Personal information
- Date of birth: 30 July 1992 (age 34)
- Place of birth: Lushnjë, Albania
- Height: 1.68 m (5 ft 6 in)
- Position: Striker

Team information
- Current team: Clube Caçadores de Ansião

Youth career
- 2005–2008: Partizani Tirana

Senior career*
Years	Team	Apps	(Gls)
2008–2010	Partizani	37	(10)
2010–2011	NK Adriatic	20	(5)
2011–2012	CDR Penelense	13	(5)
2012–2013	Partizani	21	(4)
2014	Dinamo Tirana	14	(1)
2014–2017	CDR Penelense	84	(30)
2017-	CC de Ansião		
- * Club domestic league appearances and goals as of 30 December 2012 ‡ National team caps and goals as of 30 December 2012

Salvador Sulce (born 30 July 1992) is an Albanian footballer, who currently plays in the Portuguese lower leagues.

== Club career ==
=== Partizani Tirana ===
Sulce began his professional career with Partizani Tirana at the age of 16, making his debut under the coach Shpëtim Duro.

=== CDR Penelense ===
After spending the first half of the 2010–11 season with NK Adriatic Split, he was transferred to Portugal and played with the third-tier team of CDR Penelense, making 13 appearances and scoring 5 goals. He later played once more for Partizani, having joined them in February 2012 from CDR Penelense.
