= Eduart Tanushaj =

Albanian footballer

Personal information
- Date of birth: 20 June 1983 (age 43)
- Place of birth: Laç, Albania
- Position: Forward

Senior career*
Years	Team	Apps	(Gls)
2002–2005	Laçi		
2006–2007	Kastrioti	15+	(0+)
2007–2010	Laçi	39+	(20+)
2009	→ Burreli (loan)	14	(5)
2010–2012	Pogradeci	22+	(1+)
2012–2013	Kastrioti	10	(1)
2013–2014	Laçi	26	(3)
2014–2015	Adriatiku	21	(2)
- * Club domestic league appearances and goals as of 9 November 2019

Eduart Tanushaj (born 20 June 1983 in Laç), also spelled Eduart Tanushi, is an Albanian retired footballer who last played as a forward for Adriatiku Mamurrasi in the Albanian First Division.

As of 2018, he works with the Laçi U-19 team.
