= Alban Bizhyti =

Albanian professional footballer

Personal information
- Full name: Alban Bizhyti
- Date of birth: 8 March 1984 (age 42)
- Place of birth: Lushnjë, Albania
- Position: Midfielder

Team information
- Current team: Shkumbini Peqin

Youth career
- 2000–2003: Lushnja

Senior career*
| Years | Team | Apps | (Gls) |
| 2002–2006 | Lushnja | 83 | (1) |
| 2006–2009 | Shkumbini Peqin | 87 | (6) |
| 2009–2018 | Lushnja | 143 | (8) |
| 2018– | Shkumbini Peqin | | |

International career
| 2002 | Albania U19 | 3 | (0) |
- * Club domestic league appearances and goals as of 7 April 2018

Alban Bizhyti (born 8 March 1984) is an Albanian professional footballer who plays as a midfielder for Albanian club Shkumbini Peqin in the Albanian Second Division.

== Club career ==
Bizhyti is a product of Lushnja academy; he made his professional debut on 13 April 2002 in a league match against Flamurtari Vlorë, scoring a goal only nine minute after coming on as a substitute.

On 22 May 2018, Bizhyti announced that he will retire following end of the 2017–18 season.

== International career ==
Bizhyti has represented Albania at under-19 and -21 levels, making his debut for under-19 squad in 2002 in the first qualifying round of 2003 UEFA European Under-19 Championship.

== Honours ==
Lushnja

- Albanian First Division: 2012–13
