= Alis Boçi =

Albanian footballer

Personal information
- Full name: Alis Boçi
- Date of birth: 8 February 1991 (age 35)
- Place of birth: Shkodër, Albania
- Height: 1.80 m (5 ft 11 in)
- Position: Defender

Team information
- Current team: Kastrioti
- Number: 33

Youth career
- 2006–2010: Vllaznia

Senior career*
Years	Team	Apps	(Gls)
2010–2015	Vllaznia	49	(0)
2010–2011	→ Ada (loan)		(4)
2011–2013	→ Luftëtari (loan)	42	(10)
2013	→ Teuta (loan)	0	(0)
2015–2016	Besëlidhja	21	(1)
2016–2017	Kamza	15	(1)
2017–2018	Kastrioti	11	(1)

International career
2011–2013	Albania U21	2	(0)
- * Club domestic league appearances and goals

Alis Boçi (born 8 February 1991) is an Albanian footballer who plays as a defender for KS Kastrioti in the Albanian First Division.

== Career ==
He was previously with Vllaznia Shkodër. He signed a permanent one-year contract with Luftetari Gjirokaster on 19 June 2012.
