= Albi Llenga =

Albanian footballer

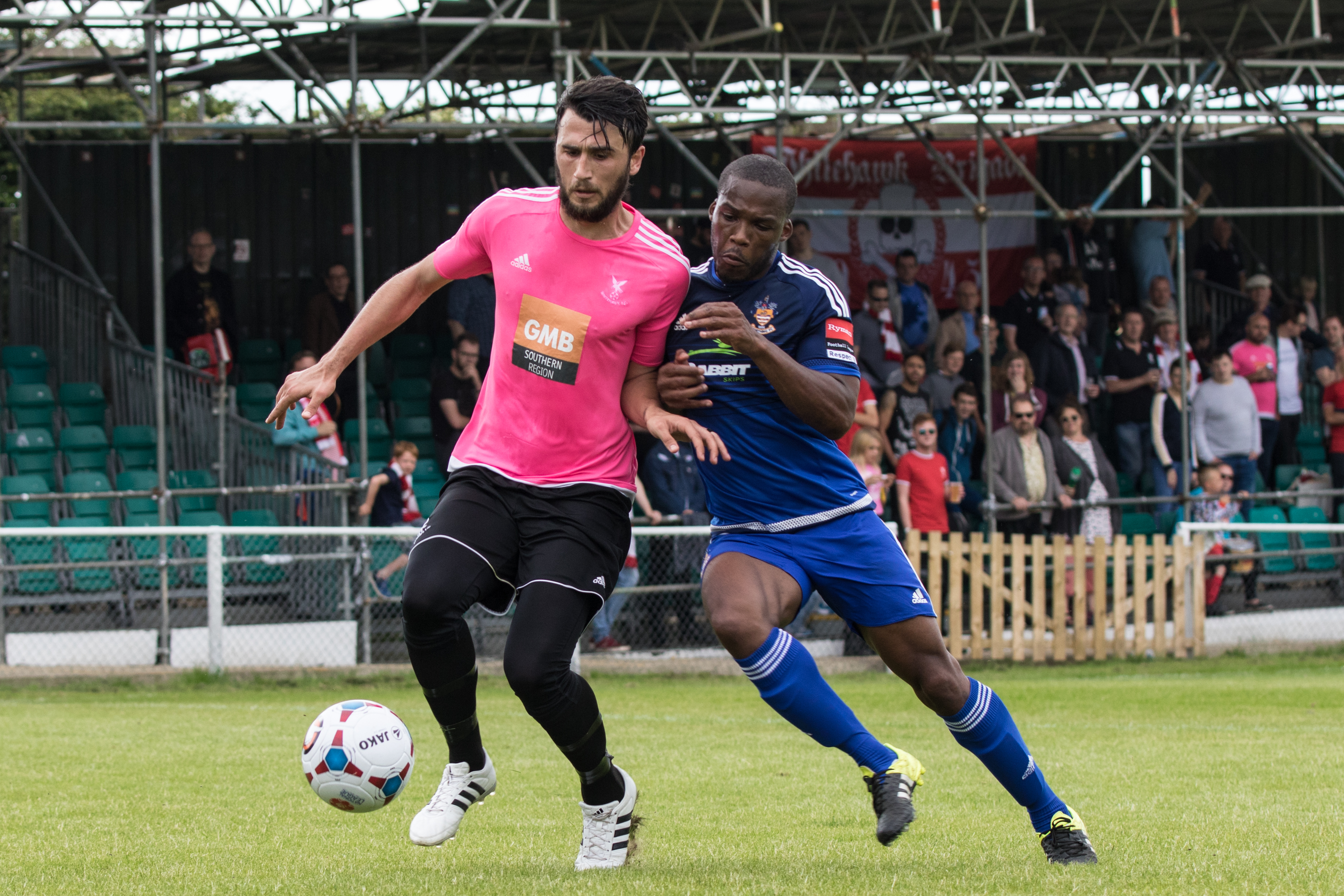
- Albi Llenga (left) playing for Whitehawk v Worthing in 2016

Personal information
- Full name: Albi Llenga
- Date of birth: 11 June 1989 (age 37)
- Place of birth: Tirana, Albania
- Position: Defender

Team information
- Current team: Proodeftiki

Senior career*
Years	Team	Apps	(Gls)
2007–2009	Ethnikos	10	(0)
2009–2010	Vllaznia	0	(0)
2010–2011	Ilioupoli	1	(0)
2011	Magoula	1	(0)
2012	Apolonia	20	(1)
2013	Naftëtari	10	(2)
2013–2014	Bylis	19	(0)
2014–2015	Aiolikos	3	(0)
2015–2016	Kalamata		
2016	Whitehawk	5	(1)
2017–2018	Mylopotamos		
2018	Rodos		
2019–	Proodeftiki		

International career
2010–2011	Albania U-21	1	(0)
- * Club domestic league appearances and goals

Albi Llenga (born 11 June 1989) is an Albanian footballer who plays as a defender.

== Club career ==
He previously played in Greece and for Bylis Ballsh in the Albanian Superliga. He last played for Whitehawk in 2016.

In January 2019, Llenga joined Proodeftiki FC.
