= Agim Meto =

Albanian footballer

Personal information
- Date of birth: 2 February 1986 (age 40)
- Place of birth: Fier, Albania
- Position: Midfielder

Youth career
- 2002–2004: Apolonia Fier

Senior career*
Years	Team	Apps	(Gls)
2004–2012	Apolonia	91	(10)
2007	→ Bylis (loan)		
2008	→ Besa Kavajë (loan)	0	(0)
2012–2014	Bylis	48	(7)
2014	Flamurtari	6	(0)
2015–2016	Laçi	34	(9)
2016	Luftëtari	11	(0)
2016–2017	Bylis	14	(3)
2017–2018	Lushnja	24	(1)
2018	Apolonia	12	(0)
- * Club domestic league appearances and goals

Agim Meto (born 2 February 1986) is an Albanian former professional footballer who played as a midfielder.

== Club career ==
=== Early career ===
He has previously played for Apolonia Fier and Flamurtari Vlorë, and he was loaned out to Besa Kavajë in 2008 from Apolonia Fier for the club's UEFA Intertoto Cup campaign, in which he played in both legs in a second round fixture against Swiss side Grasshopper Zurich

=== Bylis Ballsh ===
On 29 December 2011, Meto agreed personal terms and completed a transfer to Bylis Ballsh as a free agent.

=== Flamurtari Vlorë ===
Meto left Flamurtari Vlorë during a mass exodus at the club, which saw most of the first team players replaced in the January transfer window of 2015. He left the club after not impressing manager Ernestino Ramella.

=== Laçi ===
Following his release by Flamurtari Vlorë, Meto signed for another Albanian Superliga side KF Laçi in January 2015 and he immediately hit form as he scored 7 goals in his first 11 games in all competitions, 6 of which came in 9 league games. He announced his departure from the club in January 2016 after unilaterally terminating the contract to become a free agent.

=== Lushnja ===
On 20 July 2017, Meto returned to top flight by joining newly promoted side Lushnja by signing for the 2017–18 season. After not being used in the first four matches, Meto debuted on 12 October in the 0–2 away loss to Kukësi. He scored his first goal of campaign with a free-kick in a 2–1 away against the fellow relegation strugglers Vllaznia Shkodër on 22 November.

=== Apolonia Fier ===
On 14 September 2018, Meto agreed personal terms and inked a contract with his first club Apolonia, returning in Fier for the first time after seven seasons.

== Career statistics ==
As of 16 September 2018

Club statistics
Club	Season	League			Cup		Continental		Other		Total	
Club	Season	Division	Apps	Goals	Apps	Goals	Apps	Goals	Apps	Goals	Apps	Goals
Apolonia Fier	2004–05	Albanian First Division	0	0	0	0	—		—		0	0
Apolonia Fier	2005–06	Albanian First Division	0	0	0	0	—		—		0	0
Apolonia Fier	2006–07	Albanian Superliga	16	1	0	0	—		—		16	1
Apolonia Fier	2007–08	Albanian First Division	0	0	0	0	—		—		0	0
Apolonia Fier	2008–09	Albanian Superliga	30	1	1	0	—		—		31	1
Apolonia Fier	2009–10	Albanian Superliga	29	3	0	0	—		—		29	3
Apolonia Fier	2010–11	Albanian First Division	12	5	0	0	—		—		12	5
Apolonia Fier	2011–12	Albanian Superliga	4	0	0	0	—		—		4	0
Apolonia Fier	Total		91	10	1	0	—		—		92	10
Besa Kavajë (Note: Only for the UEFA Intertoto Cup campaign)	2008–09	Albanian Superliga	—		—		2 (Note: All appearance(s) in UEFA Intertoto Cup)	0	—		2	0
Bylis Ballsh	2011–12	Albanian Superliga	12	2	6	1	—		—		18	3
Bylis Ballsh	2012–13	Albanian Superliga	20	2	8	2	—		—		28	4
Bylis Ballsh	2013–14	Albanian Superliga	16	3	3	1	—		—		33	10
Bylis Ballsh	Total		48	7	17	4	—		—		65	11
Flamurtari Vlorë	2014–15	Albanian Superliga	6	0	3	1	4 (Note: All appearance(s) in UEFA Europa League)	0	0	0	13	1
Laçi	2014–15	Albanian Superliga	17	7	5	1	—		—		22	8
Laçi	2015–16	Albanian Superliga	17	2	2	0	2	1	1 (Note: Appearance in Albanian Supercup)	0	22	3
Laçi	Total		39	9	7	1	2	1	1	0	44	11
Luftëtari Gjirokastër	2015–16	Albanian First Division	11	0	0	0	—		—		11	0
Bylis Ballsh	2016–17	Albanian First Division	14	3	4	2	—		—		17	5
Lushnja	2017–18	Albanian Superliga	24	1	2	0	—		—		26	1
Apolonia Fier	2018–19	Albanian First Division	1	0	1	0	—		—		2	0
Career total			229	30	35	8	8	1	1	0	273	39

== Honours ==
Laçi

- Albanian Cup: 2014–15
- Albanian Supercup: 2015

Luftëtari Gjirokastër

- Albanian First Division: 2015–16
