= Davor Bratić =

Croatian footballer (born 1987)

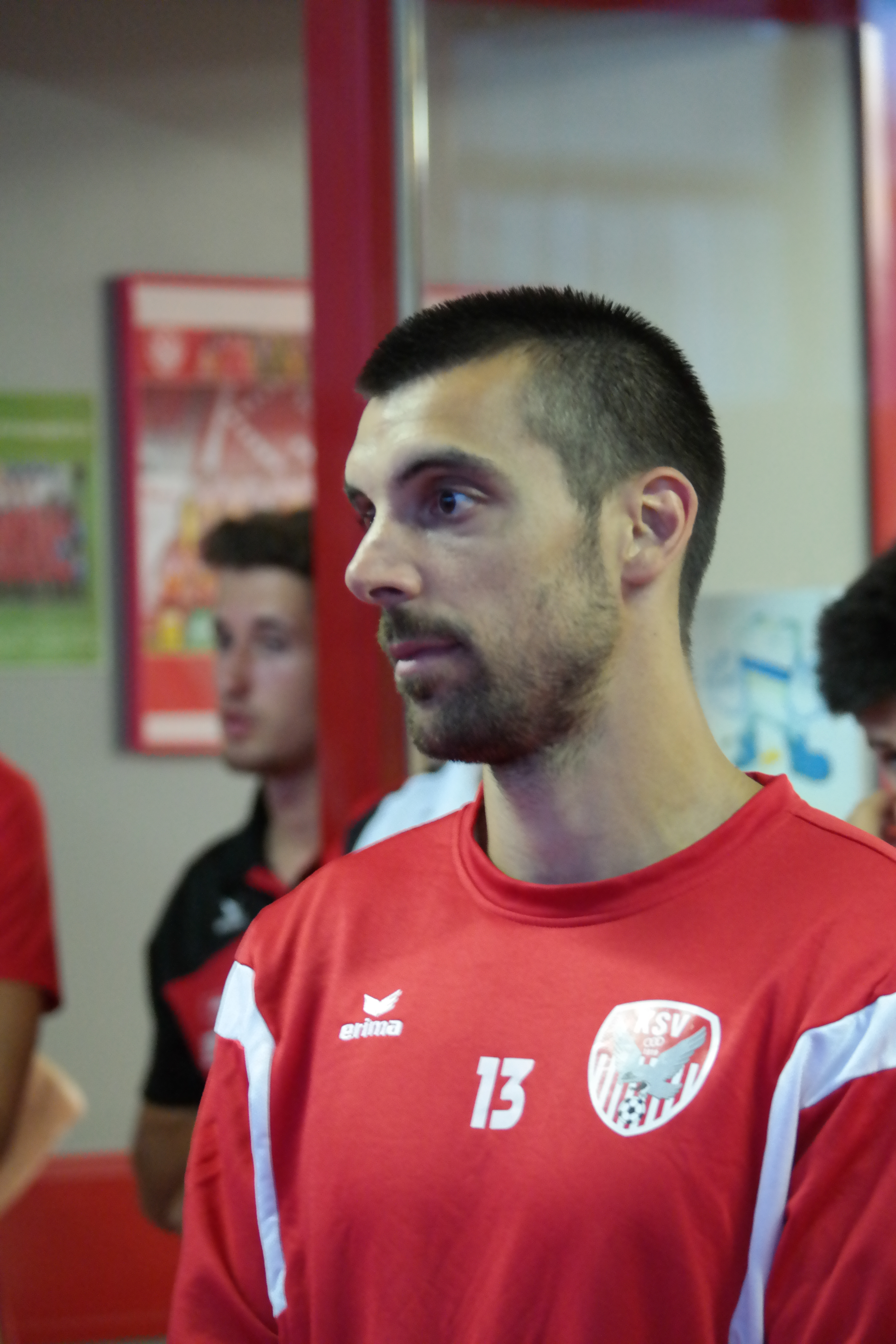

Personal information
- Date of birth: 1 May 1987 (age 39)
- Place of birth: Vukovar, SR Croatia, SFR Yugoslavia
- Height: 1.77 m (5 ft 10 in)
- Position: Midfielder

Team information
- Current team: Vuteks-Sloga
- Number: 8

Youth career
- 2000–2005: Vukovar '91

Senior career*
Years	Team	Apps	(Gls)
2005–2008	Vukovar '91	61	(6)
2008–2009	Solin	26	(3)
2009–2010	Vinogradar	20	(0)
2010–2012	Skënderbeu	53	(7)
2012–2013	Flamurtari	22	(2)
2013–2014	Kukësi	12	(0)
2014	Kastrioti	8	(2)
2014	Bistra	13	(0)
2015	FC Lankowitz	25	(7)
2016	ASK Köflach	12	(3)
2016–2018	SC Weiz	25	(3)
2017–2018	→ Kapfenberger SV (loan)	18	(2)
2018–2019	USV St. Anna/Aigen	26	(3)
2019–	Vuteks-Sloga		
- * Club domestic league appearances and goals as of 15:56, 4 July 2021 (UTC)

Davor Bratić (born 1 May 1987) is a Croatian footballer who plays for NK Vuteks-Sloga. His preferred position is central midfield, where he has played throughout his career.

== Club career ==
Besides four spells with different clubs in Albania, Bratić played for 5 teams in the Austrian lower leagues.

== Honours ==
=== KF Skënderbeu Korçë ===
- Albanian Superliga (2): 2010-11 2011-12
