= Oshobe Oladele =

Nigerian footballer

Personal information
- Date of birth: 25 November 1993 (age 32)
- Place of birth: Nigeria
- Height: 1.84 m (6 ft 0 in)
- Position: Midfielder

Team information
- Current team: Hamitköy ŞK
- Number: 80

Youth career
- 2005–2009: Ibukun Oluwa

Senior career*
Years	Team	Apps	(Gls)
2009–2012	Lions FC	44	(5)
2013–2014	Partizani Tirana	20	(1)
2014	Lokomotiv Plovdiv	28	(0)
2015–2017	Haskovo	26	
2017	MFM		
2017–2018	Yenicami	48	(1)
2019	Girne Halk Evi	17	(1)
2019–	Hamitköy ŞK	16	(0)

International career
2005	Nigeria U-17	3	(0)
2010 - 2011	Nigeria U-23	3	
- * Club domestic league appearances and goals as of 14:53, 8 February 2020 (UTC)

Oshobe Oladele (born 25 November 1993) is a Nigerian footballer who currently plays as a midfielder for Hamitköy ŞK in Cyprus.
