= Agustín González (footballer, born 1983) =

Argentine footballer

Personal information
- Full name: Agustín González Tapia
- Date of birth: 30 January 1983 (age 43)
- Place of birth: La Plata, Buenos Aires, Argentina
- Height: 1.72 m (5 ft 8 in)
- Position: Right midfielder

Team information
- Current team: Almudévar

Youth career
- 1998–2002: Estudiantes

Senior career*
Years	Team	Apps	(Gls)
2002–2004	Estudiantes LP	9	(0)
2003	→ Defensa y Justicia (loan)		
2004–2005	San Martín SJ	2	(0)
2005–2007	La Plata	47	(2)
2007–2008	Guillermo Brown	18	(3)
2008	Dinamo Tirana	2	(0)
2009	Atlético de Rafaela	4	(0)
2010–2011	Sportivo Belgrano	35	(7)
2011–2012	Central Córdoba	31	(4)
2012–2014	Sportivo Belgrano	48	(10)
2014–2016	Unión La Calera	70	(1)
2017–2019	Sarmiento de Leones	32	(5)
2019–2022	Barbastro	77	(7)
2023–	Almudévar	37	(1)

International career^{‡}
- Argentina U-17
- * Club domestic league appearances and goals ‡ National team caps and goals as of 20 October 2024

Agustín González Tapia (born 30 January 1983) is an Argentine footballer who plays as a midfielder for Spanish club Almudévar.

== Career ==
He began his career with Estudiantes de la Plata making his professional debut in a 1–1 draw against Lanús on 3 March 2002. Since then he has played for several clubs in the lower leagues of Argentine football and in Europe with Albanian side Dinamo Tirana.
