= Fusha Sportive Adriatik =

Albanian football stadium

- Fusha Sportive Velipojë
- Interactive map of Fusha Sportive Adriatik
- Location: Velipojë, Albania
- Coordinates: 41°52′20″N 19°24′3″E
- Capacity: 1,000
- Surface: Grass

Construction
- Renovated: 2010

Fusha Sportive Adriatik is a multi-use stadium in Velipojë, Albania. The stadium has a capacity of 1000 people and was called Fusha Sportive Velipojë prior to its renovation in 2010. It used to be the home ground of the local club Ada.
