= Ervis Kraja =

Albanian footballer

Personal information
- Date of birth: 26 June 1983 (age 43)
- Place of birth: Shkodër, PSR Albania
- Height: 1.91 m (6 ft 3 in)
- Position: Defender

Youth career
- Vllaznia Shkodër

Senior career*
Years	Team	Apps	(Gls)
2003–2004	Vllaznia	38	(2)
2004	Besëlidhja		
2005–2006	Besa	48	(5)
2006–2007	Iraklis	0	(0)
2007–2008	Vllaznia	26	(4)
2008–2009	Zakarpattia Uzhhorod	30	(4)
2009–2010	Besa	36	(1)
2009–2010	Skënderbeu	11	(0)
2010–2011	Vllaznia	15	(2)
2011–2012	Teuta	14	(0)
2011–2012	Dinamo	6	(0)
2012–2015	Vllaznia	16	(1)

Managerial career
- 2016–2018: Vllaznia B
- 2018: Vllaznia
- * Club domestic league appearances and goals as of 19 May 2010

Ervis Kraja (born 26 June 1983) is an Albanian football player who plays for Skënderbeu Korçë in the Albanian Superliga.

Kraja has played in Albania for Vllaznia Shkodër, Besa Kavajë, KS Besëlidhja. He also played abroad in Greece for Iraklis and in Ukraine for FC Zakarpattia Uzhhorod.

== International career ==
Kraja has participated with the Albania national football team at the U-17, U-19 and U-21 levels, and has appeared in two matches with the senior side.
