= Oriand Abazaj =

Albanian footballer (born 1985)

Personal information
- Date of birth: 17 January 1985 (age 41)
- Place of birth: Tirana, PSR Albania
- Position: Attacking midfielder

Youth career
- –2003: Dinamo Tirana

Senior career*
| Years | Team | Apps | (Gls) |
| 2003–2004 | Besëlidhja | | (9) |
| 2004–2005 | Apolonia | | |
| 2005–2006 | Shkumbini | 36 | (13) |
| 2006 | Kastrioti | 16 | (8) |
| 2007 | Tirana | 23 | (4) |
| 2008 | Kastrioti | 7 | (1) |
| 2008–2009 | Elbasani | 31 | (3) |
| 2009–2010 | Kastrioti | 33 | (8) |
| 2010–2012 | Tirana | 9 | (0) |
| 2011–2012 | → Bylis (loan) | 38 | (8) |
| 2012 | Laçi | 6 | (9) |
| 2013 | Partizani | 12 | (2) |
| 2013 | Kastrioti | 7 | (0) |
| 2014 | Bylis | 2 | (0) |

International career
| 2006–2007 | Albania U-21 | 2 | (0) |
- * Club domestic league appearances and goals

Oriand Abazaj (born 17 January 1985) is an Albanian footballer who has played for a number of sides in both the Albanian Superliga and the Albanian First Division, including KF Tirana, Kastrioti Krujë, Shkumbini Peqin and Partizani Tirana.
