= Aldo Mitraj =

Albanian footballer (born 1987)

Personal information
- Date of birth: 12 January 1987 (age 39)
- Place of birth: Ersekë, Albania
- Position: Forward

Youth career
- 2006–2008: Dinamo Tirana

Senior career*
Years	Team	Apps	(Gls)
2009–2010	Skënderbeu	3	(0)
2010–2011	Luftëtari	15	(3)
2011–2012	Iliria	23	(4)
2012–2013	Tomori	12	(6)
2013	Partizani	6	(1)
2014	Apolonia	24	(4)
2015–2016	Laçi	29	(1)
2016–2017	Sopoti	10	(4)
2017	Bylis	8	(2)
2017	Erzeni	11	(1)
2018	Tomori	7	(3)
2018–2019	Liria Prizren	4	(0)
2019	Oriku	8	(0)
2019	Burreli	10	(2)
2020	Arminia Hannover	2	(0)
- * Club domestic league appearances and goals

Aldo Mitraj (born 12 January 1987) is an Albanian former professional footballer who played as a forward.

== Career ==
=== Early career ===
Mitraj begun his football career with Dinamo Tirana and is a product of the club's academy.

=== Partizani Tirana ===
In July 2013, Mitraj went on a short trial with newly promoted top flight team Partizani Tirana, which he successfully passed, signing a contract until the end of 2013–14 season. He began the season on 31 August by playing as a second-half substitute in a 2–0 win at Kastrioti Krujë; it was also Partizani's first top flight match since May 2009.

=== Apolonia Fier ===
On 1 February 2014, Mitraj joined Apolonia Fier on a deal until the end of the season with an option to renew for another one. He made his debut six days later, entering as a second-half substitute in a league game against Shkumbini Peqin; in dying moments of the match, he was sent-off with a second yellow card. His sent-off, didn't affect the team, who won 1–0. Mitraj's first goal for his new side came in his third appearance for the club on 1 March 2014, a 1–0 win over his future team Tomori Berat. Mitraj was on the scoresheet again on 12 April, scoring another winner, this time against Pogradeci, to give Apolonia three valuable points in their bid to achieve promotion. On 29 December 2014, Mitraj and Apolonia reached an agreement to terminate their cooperation.

=== Laçi ===
On 6 January 2015, Mitraj completed a transfer to Laçi as a free agent.

=== Sopoti Librazhd ===
On 26 August 2016, Mitraj joined Sopoti Librazhd on a one-year contract. He made his club debut on 24 September in the opening league match home against Apolonia Fier, scoring his team only goal in a 2–1 defeat. During the first part of the season he made 10 league appearances, in addition two cup matches, scoring four goals in the process, being the team's top goalscorer. In January 2017, he stated that he was close to return to Laçi, but Sopoti blocked the transfer.

=== Bylis Ballsh ===
On 30 January 2017, Mitraj signed with fellow Albanian First Division side Bylis Ballsh until the end of the season.

=== Tomori Berat ===
On 13 January 2018, Mitraj was announced as the new Tomori Berat player, returning there after five years and penning a contract running until the end of the season.

=== Liria Prizren ===
On 13 August 2018, Mitraj flew off to Kosovo to pen a one-year contract with Liria Prizren. His spell at Football Superleague of Kosovo side was short-lived, as he became a free agent on 8 January of the following year after the parties decided to end their cooperation by mutual consent.

=== Oriku ===
After leaving Liria Prizren, Mitraj joined KF Oriku in January 2019.

=== Arminia Hannover ===
After a spell at KS Burreli, Mitraj moved to Germany and joined SV Arminia Hannover.

== Career statistics ==
As of 22 September 2018

Appearances and goals by club, season and competition
Club	Season	League			Cup		Continental		Other		Total	
Club	Season	Division	Apps	Goals	Apps	Goals	Apps	Goals	Apps	Goals	Apps	Goals
Skënderbeu Korçë	2009–10	Albanian Superliga	3	0	0	0	—		—		3	0
Luftëtari Gjirokastër	2010–11	Albanian First Division	15	3	0	0	—		—		15	3
Iliria Fushë-Krujë	2011–12	Albanian First Division	23	4	0	0	—		—		23	4
Tërbuni Pukë	2012–13	Albanian Superliga	1	0	0	0	—		—		1	0
Tomori Berat	2012–13	Albanian Superliga	12	6	0	0	—		—		12	6
Partizani Tirana	2013–14	Albanian Superliga	6	1	2	0	—		—		8	1
Apolonia Fier	2013–14	Albanian First Division	9	3	0	0	—		—		9	3
Apolonia Fier	2014–15	Albanian Superliga	15	1	1	1	—		—		16	2
Apolonia Fier	Total		24	4	1	1	—		—		25	5
Laçi	2014–15	Albanian Superliga	14	1	4	0	—		—		18	1
Laçi	2015–16	Albanian Superliga	25	0	7	1	2 (Note: Appearance(s) in UEFA Europa League)	0	1 (Note: Appearance in Albanian Supercup)	0	35	1
Laçi	Total		39	1	11	0	2	0	1	0	53	2
Sopoti Librazhd	2016–17	Albanian First Division	10	4	1	0	—		—		11	4
Bylis Ballsh	2016–17	Albanian First Division	8	2	0	0	—		—		8	2
Erzeni Shijak	2017–18	Albanian First Division	11	1	0	0	—		—		11	1
Tomori Berat]	2017–18	Albanian First Division	7	3	0	0	—		—		7	3
Liria	2018–19	Superleague of Kosovo	4	0	0	0	—		—		4	0
Career total			159	29	17	2	2	0	1	0	179	31

== Honours ==
Laçi

- Albanian Cup: 2014–15
- Albanian Supercup: 2015
