= Felix Udoh =

Nigerian footballer

Personal information
- Full name: Felix Okon Udoh
- Date of birth: 28 December 1993 (age 32)
- Place of birth: Nigeria
- Height: 1.72 m (5 ft 8 in)
- Position: Left back

Team information
- Current team: KF Partizani
- Number: 6

Youth career
- 2005–2011: First Bank

Senior career*
Years	Team	Apps	(Gls)
2011–2012	First Bank	20	(1)
2012–2014	KF Partizani	26	(0)

International career
2011–2012	Nigeria U-20	12	(7)
- * Club domestic league appearances and goals

Felix Okon Udoh (born 28 December 1993) is a Nigerian footballer who plays as a left back for Partizani Tirana in the Albanian Superliga.
