= 2015–16 KF Tirana season =

KF Tirana
2015–16 season
- President: Refik Halili
- Head coach: Shkëlqim Muça (until 17 October 2015); Ilir Daja (from 28 October 2015)
- Stadium: Qemal Stafa Stadium; Selman Stërmasi Stadium
- Kategoria Superiore: 5th
- Albanian Cup: Quarter-finals
- Top goalscorer: League: Elis Bakaj (14 goals); All: Elis Bakaj (15 goals)
- Highest home attendance: 7,000 vs Skënderbeu Korçë (30 November 2015, Albanian Superliga)
- Lowest home attendance: 200 vs Kastrioti Krujë (4 November 2015, Albanian Cup)
Home colours	Away colours	Third colours

The 2015–16 season was Klubi i Futbollit Tirana's 77th competitive season, 77th consecutive season in the Kategoria Superiore and 95th year in existence as a football club.

== Season overview ==
=== June ===
The defender Erion Hoxhallari came back to Tirana on 1 June after a long-season loan to Teuta Durrës. On 5 June, Shkëlqim Muça was hired the new head coach of KF Tirana, replacing Gugash Magani who resigned after some poor results at the end of the season. The former Tirana player during '80s signed a three-year contract with the club. One week later, Tirana and Kukësi reached an agreement for the loan of Muça at Kukësi for the club's Europa League matches. On 15 June, Kire Ristevski left the club and signed with Rabotnički of Macedonia.

On 26 June, Tirana completed the signing of former Austria international defender Ronald Gërçaliu on a two-year deal. On the same day, "White and Blues" signed Dritan Smajli from Kukësi on a two-year contract as well. On 28 June, Kavdanski signed a contract until the end of the season. In the last day of the month, Renaldo Kalari signed with the cross-town rivals of Partizani Tirana on a free transfer.

=== July ===
On 5 July, Lika left Vllaznia Shkodër to return to Tirana after three seasons, signing a one-year deal. Later on 12th, Tirana signed with Olsi Teqja on a two-year contract for an undisclosed fee. During his presentation, Teqja said that the move to Tirana was "a dream come true".

On 16 July, Masato Fukui signed with Tirana on a free transfer, becoming the first Japanese player to sign for an Albanian club. Five days later, Debatik Curri signed with Flamurtari Vlorë as a free transfer.

=== August ===
Mario Morina left Tirana in the first days of August in favour of Flamurtari Vlorë after not finding a mutual way with Tirana for the new contract. On 8 August 2015, Tirana completed the signing of Gilberto Fortunato for an un undisclosed fee, bringing back the Brazilian striker who left his mark in second part of 2013–14 season, where he became a fan favourite.

On 10 August, young forward Florian Kadriu came to the club on trial, which he successfully passed two days later; he was rewarded with a three-year contract. The next day, Gentian Muça returned from his short spell with Kukësi. Midfielder Erjon Vucaj inked a contract with the club for an undisclosed fee after he became a free agent and winning the trial against Flamurtari Vlorë. On 19 August, Alush Gavazaj was sent in a one-season loan at newly promoted side Tërbuni Pukë.

Tirana started the Kategoria Superiore campaign on 23 August, defeating 2–1 the newcomers of Tërbuni Pukë with the goals of Lika and Fukui. On the same day, Entonio Pashaj left the club and joined Flamurtari Vlorë after refusing to be a backup. On 25 August, Tirana purchased Dejan Karan from Hungarian side Kecskeméti on a one-year deal with an option of a further one. Four days later, Tirana announced the signing of Elis Bakaj, who returned on the team only three months after his departure. He was presented to the media on the next day.

=== September ===
Tirana started the month with Jetmir Sefa announcing his departure from the club in favour of signing with Vllaznia Shkodër. On 9 September, Marsel Çaka signed a long time contract with the club and was loaned to Kamza for the rest of the season.

In the first league match of September, Tirana didn't go more than a disappointing goalless draw at home against the newly promoted side Bylis Ballsh on 12th. To begin its Albanian Cup campaign, Tirana played its first leg match against Erzeni Shijak. They were able to clinch the victory only in the last minutes of the match thanks to the goal of Florian Kadriu.

=== October ===
Tirana endured a strong month as it was started with a 0–1 loss at the hands of rivals Partizani Tirana, which was followed by a 1–1 draw against Flamurtari Vlorë, which got the manager Shkëlqim Muça sacked after only five months on duty. Following that, both assistants of Muça were appointed temporarily managers of the team.

In the first leg of Albanian Cup's second round, Tirana thrashed 5–1 Kastrioti at Krujë with two goals scored by Gilberto and one each for Masato Fukui, Vucaj and Kërçiku. After the match against Vllaznia Shkodër, where the duo failed to secure the win, Tirana begun negotiations with coach Ilir Daja. The negotiations where finally concluded and on 28 October Daja signed a contract until the end of the season. He was presented to the media in the very next day.

=== November ===
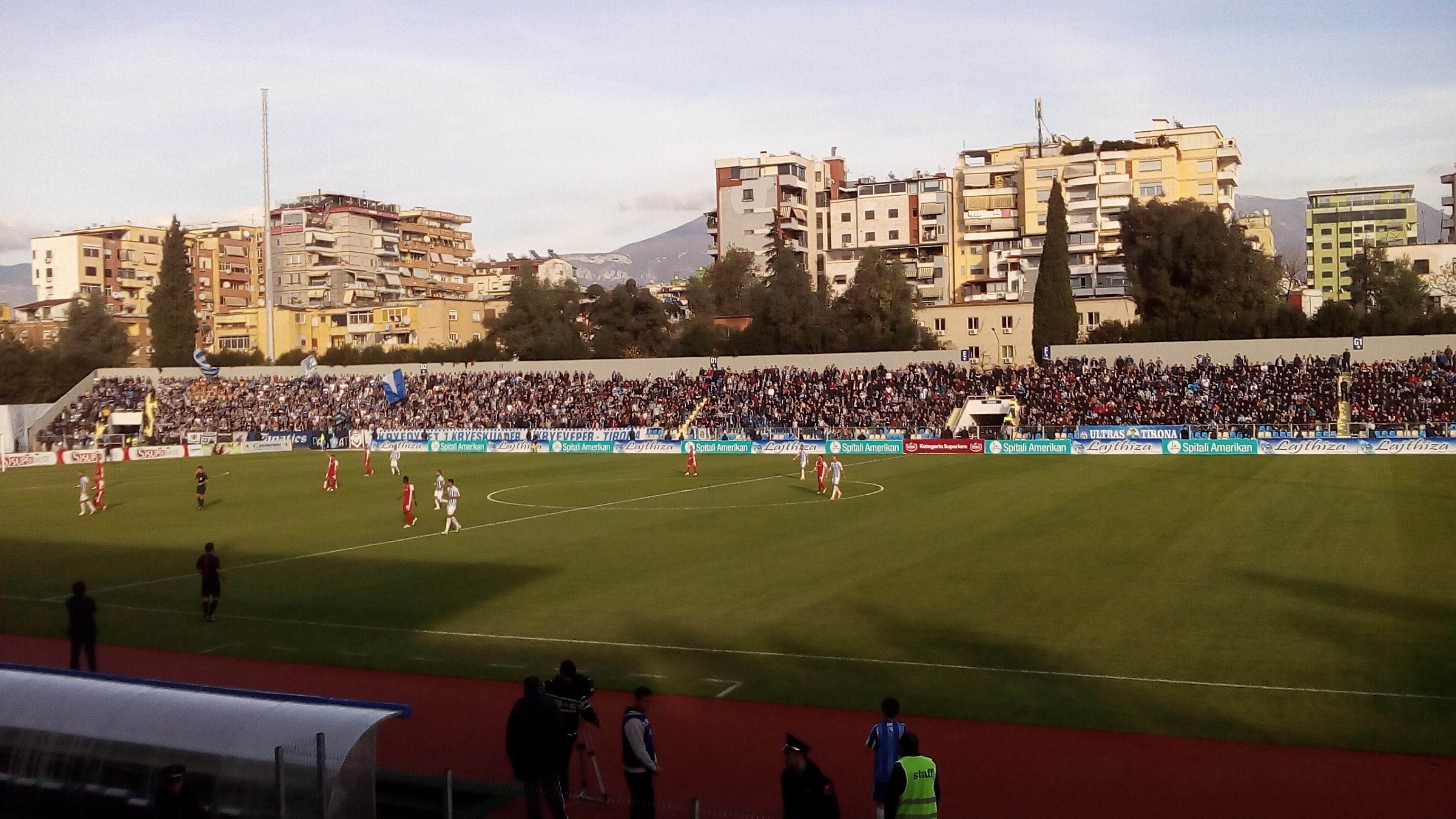
Ingaural match of Selman Stërmasi Stadium.

Ilir Daja debuted with a 2–1 win over Kukësi at Qemal Stafa Stadium on 1 November. The goal of defender Gentian Muça and an own goal from Franc Veliu clinched the win for the capital side. This match was the last for the Brazilian striker Gilberto, who had agreed to terminate his contract by mutual consent before the match.

Tirana continued a fine run with Daja as manager overwhelming 3–0 Tërbuni Pukë at home. The goals were scored by Karan, Elis Bakaj and Gilman Lika. In the middle of the month, Tirana announced that its new home Selman Stërmasi Stadium will be ready at the end of the month to host the league match against Skënderbeu Korçë. In the inaugural match, Tirana disappointed the fans by losing 2–1, with the goals scored by two former players of Tirana, Salihi and Lilaj, which did not celebrate as a sign of respect. For Tirana scored Elis Bakaj via a penalty kick

=== December ===
In December, Tirana recorded three goalless draw, respectively against Teuta Durrës, Partizani Tirana and Vllaznia Shkodër. On 23 December, in the last match of the year, Tirana recorded a 1–0 at Kukësi thanks to the header of Gentian Muça, taking the first ever win at Zeqir Ymeri Stadium. Tirana ended the second phase of the league in fourth place with 29 points.

They conceded only two goals during this phrase, all of them against Skënderbeu Korçë, keeping the goal intact in eight of nine matches. They ended the first part of the season as the team with the best defence, conceding 10 goals in 18 matches, less than any other team. On 25 December, Kavdanski left the club by terminated his contract with the club.

=== January ===
In January of the following year, during the winter transfer window, Tirana secured the services of the Brazilian duo Hugo Almeida and Alex Willian respectively form Portuguesa and Icasa. They signed both a six-month contract with an option to extend it for a year, and were presented on 13 January. On the same day, the 26-years old defender Endrit Idrizaj returned to the club after spending the last year in loan at Apolonia Fier.

The ethnic Albanian prodigy Florian Kadriu was sent on loan at fellow Kategoria Superiore side Teuta Durrës until the end of the season in order to gain more experience. Stivi Frashëri terminated his contract with Tirana by mutual consensus. Tirana kicked off 2016 by beating away Flamurtari Vlorë in the first leg of quarter-final of Albanian Cup, thanks to an Argjend Malaj winner. Back in Kategoria Superiore, on 30 January, Tirana won comfortably 3–1 away against Tërbuni Pukë to go up in the 3rd place, overtaking Teuta Durrës. The goals were scored by Bakaj, Muzaka and Muça.

=== February ===
On 1 February, in the last day of winter transfer window, Tirana signed Enriko Papa from Bylis Ballsh on a free transfer. He signed a one-year contract with the option of a further one. On 6 February, Tirana announced via its official website that they have terminated the contract with Brazilian forward Hugo after he requeried to leave the club due to familiar reasons. However, five hours later, Hugo returned to the team, and also brought his family in Albania, saying that he never asked the club to leave and the situation that was created was a misunderstanding created by his manager, leading Hugo to terminate they cooperation.

A day later, Tirana recorded an emphatic 3–0 away win over Laçi, thanks to the goals of Bakaj, Muzaka and Hugo. That was the first win at Laçi Stadium since 5 May 2012 where Tirana won thanks to a winner of Bekim Balaj. However, during the match Bakaj and Karan were booked meaning that they would miss the following league match against Bylis Ballsh at home. However, during the match Tirana was able to beat Bylis Ballsh 2–0 thanks to the goals of Muzaka and the youngster Majkel Peci, who made his Kategoria Superiore debut. Tirana also registered the first victory at the newly renovated Selman Stërmasi Stadium. In the returning leg of Albanian Cup's quarter-final at Selman Stërmasi Stadium, Tirana was surprisingly knocked out by Flamurtari Vlorë who won 2–1 to qualify in the next round with the aggregate 2–2 (away rule goals), in the match which saw the dismissal of Erion Hoxhallari and Olsi Teqja, leaving Tirana with nine players for the last ten minutes of the match. On 19 February, the vice-captain Gentian Muça successfully underwent surgery in his knee that would rule him out for two months.

Three days later, in the next league match against the league leaders Skënderbeu Korçë, Tirana lost 0–1 in a match which was infamously marred by the "one-sided" decisions of the referee Andi Koçi, who did not give a clear penalty to Tirana's Gilman Lika while awarded an incorrect penalty to Skënderbeu's Hamdi Salihi, who scored the lone goal. Skënderbeu's coach Mirel Josa and also the team's vice captain Orges Shehi and Bakary Nimaga admitted that the penalty of Tirana was correct. A day later, the club's sporting director Devi Muka came out on a press conference to condemn the arbitration of Andi Koçi, while Tirana's coach Ilir Daja accused the referee for not leaving Tirana to fight for the title. One the same day, Tirana filed an official document that requested the lifetime ban of referee Andi Koçi, adding also that Enea Jorgji should not judge any of Tirana matches. On 26 February, Hugo Almeida left the team after terminating his contract with the club by mutual consensus. In the last match of the month, Tirana earned a goalless draw at home against Teuta Durrës, they rivals for the European spot.

=== March ===
In the match of the March, Tirana fell 2–0 to Patizani Tirana at Qemal Stafa Stadium, losing out the 3rd spot in the process. The striker Elis Bakaj who made his return from injury in the 50th minute of the match was red-carded five minutes later, leaving the team with ten players, which led the Disciplinary Committee of AFA to suspend him for five matches for his behaviour. In the next match four days later, Tirana didn't go more than a goalless draw against Flamurtari Vlorë at home, felling down to 5th place.

Four days later, Tirana confirmed the bad form recently by losing the Albanian derby 3–1 to Vllaznia Shkodër at Reshit Rusi Stadium. The team took the lead in the 5th minute though an own goal from Stefan Cicmil, but Vllaznia Shkodër bounced back and scored three times, two in the first half.

Tirana tried to react and to turn page in the next match versus Kukësi, but didn't go more than a 1–1 draw, despite leading in the first half with a goal from Gjergji Muzaka. Tirana finished the month without winning a single match; on 22 March, the club fined the defender Dritan Smajli for breaking the rules one day before the match against Kukësi, and was not included in the team for the match. Four days later, Tirana even lost the friendly versus the Albanian First Division side Kamza. In the last day of the month, Tirana liquidated €198.000 debts to its former players and employers, avoiding potential penalties that could be applied by FIFA and UEFA.

=== April ===
Tirana commenced the month by taking a 3–0 home victory over Tërbuni Pukë thanks to an Elis Bakaj hat-trick, returning Tirana in the winning ways after six consecutive league matches without a win. That was the second win at Selman Stëmasi Stadium and Elis Bakaj become the first player to score a hat-trick for Tirana since Bekim Balaj on 23 October 2011. On 5 April, Tirana terminated its cooperating with Alex Willian who didn't play a single minute in the senior team in competitive matches, being reduced to play only with the reserve side. Tirana then defeated Laçi at home thanks again to Elis Bakaj winner to keep the European chances alive.

After that, Tirana made another false step as they didn't go more than a goalless against the penultimate side of Bylis Ballsh. In the next match, Tirana suffered another defeat at the hands of Skënderbeu Korçë, losing 1–0 at Selman Stërmasi Stadium thanks to the Hamdi Salihi's later winner. That was Tirana's fourth league loss against Skënderbeu Korçë in as many matches played. In the last league match for this month, Teuta Durrës held Tirana to a 0–0 draw at Niko Dovana Stadium.

=== May ===
Tirana begun May with a 2–2 home draw against Partizani Tirana, with the goals scored by Gentian Muça and Elis Bakaj. The team was on lead until 94th minute, but Partizani levelled the scored thanks to a Realdo Fili strike. For singing anti-Partizani crust with the fans, Gentian Muça was accused of public incitement of hatred, and was banned for one year from all competitions by the Disciplinary Committee of AFA, effective immediately. Also Tirana's stadium was banned for eight matches for its fans behaviour, also the Sporting Director Devi Muka was banned for ten matches after assaulting a Partizani Tirana member staff.

On 8 May, in the next league match, Tirana lost 2–1 away to Flamurtari Vlorë, leaving Tirana mathematically out of European competitions for the fourth consecutive season. In the last match at home, Tirana beat Vllaznia Shkodër thanks to the lone goal of Elis Bakaj, his 13th in the league. On final day of the season, Tirana was defeated 2–1 away to Kukësi to finish the season in the 5th position, remaining out of European competitions for the fourth consecutive year. Tirana collected 53 points, 18 less the last season.

== Players ==
=== Squad information ===
As of 6 April 2016

Squad No.	Name	Nationality	Position(s)	Date of birth (age)
Goalkeepers
1	Ilir Avdyli	(Kosovo)	GK	20 May 1990 (aged 25)
22	Marsel Çaka	(Albania)	GK	31 March 1995 (aged 20)
31	Edvan Bakaj	(Albania)	GK	9 October 1987 (aged 27)
Defenders
2	Dritan Smajli	(Albania)	RB	12 February 1985 (aged 30)
3	Endrit Idrizaj	(Albania)	LB	14 June 1989 (aged 26)
4	Gentian Muça	(Albania)	CB / DM	13 May 1987 (aged 28)
5	Dejan Karan	(Serbia)	CB	13 August 1988 (aged 26)
16	Ronald Gërçaliu	(Austria)	RB / LB	12 February 1986 (aged 29)
21	Olsi Teqja	(Albania)	RB / LB / CB	27 July 1988 (aged 26)
28	Erion Hoxhallari	(Albania)	LB	26 February 1993 (aged 22)
Midfielders
7	Gilman Lika	(Albania)	AM / LW / RW	13 January 1987 (aged 28)
8	Ervin Bulku (captain)	(Albania)	CM / CB	3 March 1981 (aged 34)
10	Erjon Vuçaj	(Albania)	CM / AM	25 December 1990 (aged 24)
13	Erando Karabeci (vice-captain)	(Albania)	CM / DM / AM	6 September 1988 (aged 26)
14	Fjoralb Deliaj	(Albania)	CM	4 April 1997 (aged 18)
17	Gjergji Muzaka	(Albania)	LW / RW	26 September 1984 (aged 30)
18	Dorian Kërçiku	(Albania)	CM / RB / LB	30 July 1993 (aged 21)
19	Elis Bakaj	(Albania)	AM / LW / RW / CF	25 June 1987 (aged 28)
20	Enriko Papa	(Albania)	AM	12 March 1993 (aged 22)
23	Argjend Malaj	(Kosovo)	CM	16 October 1994 (aged 20)
25	Majkel Peci	(Albania)	AM	29 August 1996 (aged 18)
–	Anxhelo Mumajesi	(Albania)	AM	25 March 1997 (aged 18)
Forwards
9	Grend Halili	(Albania)	CF	24 May 1998 (aged 17)
99	Masato Fukui	(Japan)	CF	14 November 1988 (aged 26)

== Transfers ==
=== Transfers in ===
Date	Pos.	Nationality	Player	Age	Moving from	Fee	Ref
1 June 2015	DF	(Albania)	Erion Hoxhallari (Note: Loan return.)	19	Teuta Durrës	N/A	
26 June 2015	DF	(Austria)	Ronald Gërçaliu	29	Rheindorf Altach	Free	
26 June 2015	DF	(Albania)	Dritan Smajli	30	Kukësi	Free	
28 June 2015	DF	(Bulgaria)	Martin Kavdanski	28	Marek Dupnitsa	Free	
5 July 2015	MF	(Albania)	Gilman Lika	28	Vllaznia Shkodër	Free	
12 July 2015	MF	(Albania)	Olsi Teqja	26	Laçi	Free	
16 July 2015	FW	(Japan)	Masato Fukui	26	Sutjeska Nikšić	Free	
8 August 2015	FW	(Brazil)	Gilberto Fortunato	27	Free agent	Free	
10 August 2015	FW	(North Macedonia)	Florian Kadriu	18	Free agent	Free	
11 August 2015	DF	(Albania)	Gentian Muça (Note: Loan return.)	28	Kukësi	Free	
12 August 2015	MF	(Albania)	Erjon Vucaj	24	Flamurtari Vlorë	Free	
25 August 2015	DF	(Serbia)	Dejan Karan	27	Kecskeméti	Free	
29 August 2015	MF	(Albania)	Elis Bakaj	28	Hapoel Ra'anana	Free	
13 January 2016	FW	(Brazil)	Hugo Almeida	30	Portugesa	Free	
13 January 2016	MF	(Brazil)	Alex Willian	27	Icasa	Free	
13 January 2016	DF	(Albania)	Endrit Idrizaj	26	Apolonia Fier	Free	
1 February 2016	MF	(Albania)	Enriko Papa	22	Bylis Ballsh	Free	

=== Transfers out ===
Date	Pos.	Nationality	Player	Age	Moving to	Fee	Ref
31 May 2015	MF	(Albania)	Elis Bakaj	27	Hapoel Ra'anana	Free	
31 May 2015	FW	(Burundi)	Selemani Ndikumana	28	1º de Agosto	Free	
31 May 2015	MF	(Albania)	Renato Hyshmeri	26	Bylis Ballsh	Free	
15 June 2015	DF	(North Macedonia)	Kire Ristevski	24	Rabotnički	Free	
30 June 2015	DF	(Albania)	Renaldo Kalari	31	Partizani Tirana	Free	
19 July 2015	DF	(Albania)	Debatik Curri	31	Flamurtari Vlorë	Free	
20 August 2015	FW	(Albania)	Mario Morina	22	Flamurtari Vlorë	Free	
23 August 2015	DF	(Albania)	Entonio Pashaj	30	Flamurtari Vlorë	Free	
1 September 2015	MF	(Albania)	Jetmir Sefa	28	Vllaznia Shkodër	Free	
4 November 2015	FW	(Brazil)	Gilberto Fortunato	27	PTT Rayong (Note: Following Gilberto's departure he joined PTT Rayong.)	N/A	
25 December 2015	DF	(Bulgaria)	Martin Kavdanski	28	Lokomotiv Plovdiv (Note: Following Kavdanski' departure he joined Lokomotiv Plovdiv.)	N/A	
12 January 2016	GK	(Albania)	Stivi Frashëri	25	Bylis Ballsh (Note: Following Frashëri's departure he joined Bylis Ballsh.)	N/A	
26 February 2016	FW	(Brazil)	Hugo Almeida	30	Itumbiara (Note: Following Hugo's departure he joined Itumbiara.)	N/A	
5 April 2016	MF	(Brazil)	Alex Willian	28	Cuiabá (Note: Following Willian's departure he joined Cuiabá.)	N/A	

=== Loans out ===
Start date	Pos.	Nationality	Name	To	End date	Ref.
12 June 2015	DF	(Albania)	Gentian Muça	Kukësi	August 2016	
19 August 2015	GK	(Albania)	Alush Gavazaj	Tërbuni Pukë	30 June 2016	
9 September 2015	GK	(Albania)	Marsel Çaka	Kamza	30 June 2016	
13 January 2016	FW	(North Macedonia)	Florian Kadriu	Teuta Durrës	30 June 2016	

== Pre-season and friendlies ==
23 July 2015 Friendly	Mladost Carev (North Macedonia)	1–2	(Albania) Tirana	Ohrid, Macedonia
13:00 CET	Iliovski 76'	Report	Fukui 46', 50'

29 July 2015 Friendly	Shkupi (North Macedonia)	1–2	(Albania) Tirana	Skopje, Macedonia
13:00 CET	Osmani 43'	Report	Sefa 5', 36'	Stadium: Čair Stadium

5 August 2015 Friendly	Tirana (Albania)	3–1	(Albania) Kamza	Tirana, Albania
14:00 CET	Malaj 28'; Gërçaliu 44'; Lika 46'	Report	Ymeri 80'	Stadium: Skënder Halili Complex

12 August 2015 Friendly	Tirana (Albania)	3–0	(Albania) Korabi Peshkopi	Tirana, Albania
14:00 CET	Lika 41'; Muça 45'; Kadriu 61'	Report		Stadium: Skënder Halili Complex

11 November 2015 Friendly	Tirana (Albania)	1–1	(Albania) Sopoti Librazhd	Tirana, Albania
11:00 CET	Muzaka 72'	Report	Kastrati 52'	Stadium: Skënder Halili Complex

14 November 2015 Friendly	Kastrioti Krujë (Albania)	1–3	(Albania) Tirana	Krujë, Albania
	Djarmati 7'	Report	Lika 4'; Mumajesi 52'; Deliaj 62'	Stadium: Kastrioti Stadium

28 December 2015 Friendly	Internacional Tirana (Albania)	0–4	(Albania) Tirana	Pezë Helmës, Tirana, Albania
11:00 CET	Kërçiku 37'; Sallaku 72'; Mumajesi 78'; Prendi 88'	Report		Stadium: Internacional Complex

9 January 2016 Friendly	Tirana (Albania)	1–1	(Albania) Erzeni	Pezë Helmës, Tirana, Albania
	Halili 87'	Report	Rezi 25'	Stadium: Internacional Complex

14 January 2016 Friendly	Apolonia Fier (Albania)	4–2	(Albania) Tirana	Fer, Albania
	Kaja 45'; Andoni 55'; Broshka 73'; Hasani 79'	Report	Malaj 38'; Halili 57'	Stadium: Loni Papuçiu Stadium

17 January 2016 Friendly	Tirana (Albania)	4–2	(Albania) Korabi Peshkopi	Tirana, Albania
	El. Bakaj 16', 28'; Karabeci 63'; Halili 83'	Report	Mziu 3', 13'	Stadium: Skënder Halili Complex

2 February 2016 Friendly	Tirana (Albania)	1–1	(Kosovo) Hajvalia	Pezë Helmës, Tirana, Albania
14:00 CET	Hugo Almeida 82'	Report	Misini 88'	Stadium: Internacional Complex

26 March 2016 Friendly	Tirana (Albania)	0–1	(Albania) Kamza	Tirana, Albania
		Report		Stadium: Selman Stërmasi Stadium; Attendance: 10

3 April 2016 Friendly	Tirana (Albania)	4–2	(Albania) Tirana U19	Tirana, Albania
		Report		Stadium: Selman Stërmasi Stadium

== Competitions ==
=== Kategoria Superiore ===
==== League table ====
Pos	Team	Pld	W	D	L	GF	GA	GD	Pts	Qualification or relegation
3	Kukësi	36	18	9	9	41	25	+16	63 (Note: Kukësi ahead of Teuta on head-to-head record; Kukësi–Teuta 3–0, Teuta–Kukësi 1–0, Kukësi–Teuta 2–2, Teuta–Kukësi 0–0.)	Qualification for the Europa League first qualifying round (Note: Kukësi qualified for the Europa League first qualifying round by winning the 2015–16 Albanian Cup.)
4	Teuta	36	18	9	9	43	28	+15	63	Qualification for the Europa League first qualifying round
5	Tirana	36	13	14	9	37	25	+12	53	
6	Vllaznia	36	11	6	19	36	42	−6	39	
7	Laçi	36	8	12	16	30	48	−18	36	

Source: Albanian Football Association (in Albanian), Soccerway
Rules for classification: 1) Points; 2) Head-to-head points; 3) Head-to-head goal difference; 4) Head-to-head goals scored; 5) Goal difference; 6) Goals scored; 7) Draw.

==== Results summary ====
Overall								Home						Away					
Pld	W	D	L	GF	GA	GD	Pts	W	D	L	GF	GA	GD	W	D	L	GF	GA	GD
36	13	14	9	37	25	+12	53	7	9	2	18	8	+10	6	5	7	19	17	+2

Last updated: 19 May 2016.
Source: Competitive matches

==== Results by round ====
Round	1	2	3	4	5	6	7	8	9	10	11	12	13	14	15	16	17	18	19	20	21	22	23	24	25	26	27	28	29	30	31	32	33	34	35	36
Ground	A	A	H	A	H	A	H	A	H	H	H	A	H	A	H	A	H	A	A	A	H	A	H	A	H	A	H	H	H	A	H	A	H	A	H	A
Result	W	D	D	L	W	L	D	D	W	W	D	W	L	D	D	W	D	W	W	W	W	L	D	L	D	L	D	W	W	D	L	D	D	L	W	L
Position	2	4	5	6	6	6	5	5	5	5	5	4	5	5	5	5	5	4	3	3	3	3	3	4	5	5	5	5	5	5	5	5	5	5	5	5

Source: Competitive matches
A = Away; H = Home; W = Win; D = Draw; L = Loss

==== Matches ====
24 August 2015 1	Tërbuni Pukë	1–2	Tirana	Pukë
17:00 CET	Danaj (yellow card) 1'; Malindi 22'	Report	Lika 40'; Gilberto (yellow card) 47'; Fukui 68'; Karabeci (yellow card) 79'	Stadium: Ismail Xhemali Stadium; Attendance: 1,200; Referee: Bardhyl Pashaj

29 August 2015 2	Laçi	1–1	Tirana	Krujë
17:00 CET	Doku (yellow card) 21'; Adeniyi 28'; Veliaj (red card) 76'	Report	Gërçaliu (yellow card) 31'; Teqja (yellow card) 63'; Kërçiku (yellow card) 75'; Muça (yellow card) 90'; Karabeci 90+2'; Frashëri (yellow card) 90+3'; Fukui (red card) 90+3'	Stadium: Kastrioti Stadium; Attendance: 1,000; Referee: Andi Koçi

12 September 2015 3	Tirana	0–0	Bylis Ballsh	Tirana
18:00 CET		Report	Peposhi (yellow card) 78'; Simić (yellow card) 90'	Stadium: Qemal Stafa Stadium; Attendance: 3,000; Referee: Remzi Sadiku

21 September 2015 4	Skënderbeu Korçë	2–1	Tirana	Korçë
19:00 CET	Berisha 25' (yellow card) 90+3'; Olayinka (yellow card) 75'; Progni 85'	Report	Fukui 3'; Gërçaliu (yellow card) 12'; Bakaj (yellow card) 24'; Smajlaj (yellow card) 43'; Karabeci (yellow card) 12'	Stadium: Skënderbeu Stadium; Attendance: 3,700; Referee: Andi Koçi

26 September 2015 5	Tirana	2–0	Teuta Durrës	Tirana
18:00 CET	Muça 3'; Karan 28' (yellow card) 43'	Report	Hoxha (yellow card) 22'; Mihani (yellow card) 90+1'	Stadium: Qemal Stafa Stadium; Attendance: 2,100; Referee: Kridens Meta

3 October 2015 6	Partizani Tirana	1–0	Tirana	Tirana
20:45 CET	Trashi (yellow card) 13'; Sukaj 51'; Račić (yellow card) 84'; Ibrahimi (yellow card) 88'	Report	Teqja (yellow card) 77'; Karan (yellow card) 84'; Bakaj (yellow card) 88'; Gilberto (yellow card) 88'	Stadium: Qemal Stafa Stadium; Attendance: 10,031; Referee: Kridens Meta

17 October 2015 7	Tirana	1–1	Flamurtari Vlorë	Tirana
16:00 CET	Vucaj 2'; Bakaj (yellow card) 55'; Hoxhallari (yellow card) 77'	Report	Zeqiri (yellow card) 32'; Tskhadadze 77'; Popkhadze (yellow card) 84'	Stadium: Qemal Stafa Stadium; Attendance: 2,100; Referee: Enea Jorgji

25 October 2015 8	Vllaznia Shkodër	1–1	Tirana	Pukë (Note: The match was held in Ismail Xhemali Stadium due to reconstruction of Loro Boriçi Stadium.)
13:00 CET	Krymi (yellow card) 18'; Cicmil (yellow card) 39'; Arbëri 82'; Sosa (yellow card) 88'	Report	Kërçiku (yellow card) 29'; Karabeci (yellow card) 33'; Smajli 40'	Stadium: Ismail Xhemali Stadium; Attendance: 800; Referee: Remzi Sadiku

1 November 2015 9	Tirana	2–1	Kukësi	Tirana
14:00 CET	Muça 8'; Velu 38' (o.g.); Hoxhallari (yellow card) 57'; Ed. Bakaj (yellow card) 90+2'	Report	Erick Flores (yellow card) 52'; Shameti (yellow card) 86'; Dhima (yellow card) 88'; Mici 90+1'	Stadium: Qemal Stafa Stadium; Attendance: 2,500; Referee: Enea Jorgji

7 November 2015 10	Tirana	3–0	Tërbuni Pukë	Tirana
14:00 CET	Karan 8'; El. Bakaj 48' (yellow card) 58'; Lika 67'	Report	Karapici (yellow card) 87'	Stadium: Qemal Stafa Stadium; Attendance: 2,000; Referee: Kreshnik Cjapi

18 November 2015 11	Tirana	0–0	Laçi	Tirana
17:00 CET	Karan (yellow card) 22'; Malaj (yellow card) 65'; Hoxhallari (yellow card) 74'; Fukui (yellow card) 90+2'	Report	Sefgjinaj (yellow card) 22'; Kruja (yellow card) 45'; Meto (yellow card) 47'; Nimani (yellow card) 85'; Vujadinović (yellow card) 90+1'	Stadium: Qemal Stafa Stadium; Attendance: 2,000; Referee: Kridens Meta

21 November 2015 12	Bylis Ballsh	0–1	Tirana	Ballsh
14:00 CET	Gava (yellow card) 45'; Simić (yellow card) 64'; Basriu (yellow card) 84'	Report	El. Bakaj 45+2' (yellow card) 84'; Vuçaj (yellow card) 15'; Kavdanski (yellow card) 30'; Kërçiku (yellow card) 82'; Muzaka (yellow card) 90+4'	Stadium: Adush Muça Stadium; Attendance: 800; Referee: Eldorjan Hamiti

29 November 2015 13	Tirana	1–2	Skënderbeu Korçë	Tirana
14:00 CET	El. Bakaj 76' (pen.); Karabeci (yellow card) 77'; Teqja (yellow card) 79'; Lika (yellow card) 89'	Report	Salihi 4'; Vangjeli (yellow card) 66'; Lilaj 71'	Stadium: Selman Stërmasi Stadium; Attendance: 7,000; Referee: Enea Jorgji

5 December 2015 14	Teuta Durrës	0–0	Tirana	Durrës
17:00 CET	Hoxha (yellow card) 4' (yellow-red card) 90+3'; Hodo (yellow card) 47'; Kotobelli (yellow card) 73'; Magani (yellow card) 80'; Shkalla (yellow card) 83'	Report	Kavdanski (yellow card) 53'; Lika (yellow card) 73'; Karan (yellow card) 80'	Stadium: Niko Dovana Stadium; Attendance: 1,500; Referee: Emirjon Sino

7 December 2015 15	Tirana	0–0	Partizani Tirana	Tirana
14:00 CET	Hoxhallari (yellow card) 38'	Report	Kalari (yellow card) 16'; Vrapi (yellow card) 90+3'	Stadium: Selman Stërmasi Stadium; Attendance: 6,531; Referee: Lorenc Jemini

13 December 2015 16	Flamurtari Vlorë	0–2	Tirana	Vlorë
14:00 CET	Zeqaj (yellow card) 39'; Maxhuni (yellow card) 40'	Report	Hoxhallari (yellow card) 41'; El. Bakaj 22', 44'	Stadium: Flamurtari Stadium; Attendance: 200; Referee: Kreshnik Cjapi

19 December 2015 17	Tirana	0–0	Vllaznia Shkodër	Tirana
13:00 CET	Kërçiku (yellow card) 43'; Hoxhallari (yellow card) 52'	Report	Dragojević (yellow card) 82'	Stadium: Selman Stërmasi Stadium; Attendance: 1,500; Referee: Emirjon Sino

23 December 2015 18	Kukësi	0–1	Tirana	Kukës
14:00 CET	Musolli (yellow card) 46'; Nika (yellow card) 89'	Report	Muça 30'	Stadium: Zeqir Ymeri Stadium; Attendance: 1,000; Referee: Bardhyl Pashaj

30 January 2016 19	Tërbuni Pukë	1–3	Tirana	Pukë
14:00 CET	Marku 59'; Çema (yellow card) 73'; Beci (yellow card) 79'	Report	El. Bakaj 10'; Karan (yellow card) 33'; Muzaka 75'; Muça 83'	Stadium: Ismail Xhemali Stadium; Attendance: 300; Referee: Kreshnik Cjapi

7 February 2016 20	Laçi	0–3	Tirana	Laç
13:00 CET		Report	Smajli (yellow card) 39'; El. Bakaj (yellow card) 57' (goal) 65'; Muzaka 71'; Hugo 80'; Karan (yellow card) 89'	Stadium: Laçi Stadium; Attendance: 1,031; Referee: Lorenc Jemini

13 February 2016 21	Tirana	2–0	Bylis Ballsh	Tirana
13:10 CET	Papa (yellow card) 68'; Muzaka 74' (pen.); Smajli (yellow card) 87'; Peci 89'	Report	Gava (yellow card) 12'; Hoxhaj (yellow card) 60'	Stadium: Selman Stërmasi Stadium; Attendance: 1,200; Referee: Andi Koçi

22 February 2016 22	Skënderbeu Korçë	2–1	Tirana	Korçë
18:00 CET	Vangjeli (yellow card) 38'; Progni (yellow card) 58'; Salihi 77' (pen.); Arapi (yellow card) 87'	Report	Kërçiku (yellow card) 49'; Gërçaliu (yellow card) 52'	Stadium: Skënderbeu Stadium; Attendance: 3,850; Referee: Andi Koçi

27 February 2016 23	Tirana	0–0	Teuta Durrës	Tirana
13:30 CET		Report	Kotobelli (yellow card) 20'; Lamçja (yellow card) 89'; Shkalla (yellow card) 90'	Stadium: Selman Stërmasi Stadium; Attendance: 2,000; Referee: Remzi Sadiku

5 March 2016 24	Partizani Tirana	2–0	Tirana	Tirana
18:00 CET	Sukaj 6'; Fejzullahu 12'; Kalari (yellow card) 62'	Report	El. Bakaj (yellow card) 55' (yellow-red card) 55'; Teqja (yellow card) 60'; Smajli (yellow card) 65'	Stadium: Qemal Stafa Stadium; Attendance: 8,531; Referee: Lorenc Jemini

9 March 2016 25	Tirana	0–0	Flamurtari Vlorë	Tirana
14:00 CET	Karan (yellow card) 39'; Hoxhallari (yellow card) 52'; Karabeci (yellow card) 90'	Report	Nicolini (yellow card) 35'; Marku (yellow card) 70'; Telushi (yellow card) 80'	Stadium: Selman Stërmasi Stadium; Attendance: 410; Referee: Bardhyl Pashaj

13 March 2016 26	Vllaznia Shkodër	3–1	Tirana	Shkodër
13:00 CET	Cicmil 11'; Shtubina (yellow card) 21' (goal) 22'; Pjeshka (yellow card) 70'; Kalaja 75'	Report	Cicmil 5' (o.g.); Lika (yellow card) 12'	Stadium: Reshit Rusi Stadium; Attendance: 1,000; Referee: Adrian Beqiri

20 March 2016 27	Tirana	1–1	Kukësi	Tirana
17:00 CET	Muzaka 20'; Peçi (yellow card) 23'; Kërçiku (yellow card) 37'	Report	Erick Flores 53'; Nika (yellow card) 68'	Stadium: Selman Stërmasi Stadium; Attendance: 500; Referee: Olsi Sokoli

3 April 2016 28	Tirana	3–0	Tërbuni Pukë	Tirana
19:00 CET	El. Bakaj 22', 79', 87'; Karabeci (yellow card) 89'	Report	Tasić (yellow card) 53'; Borshi (yellow card) 73'	Stadium: Selman Stërmasi Stadium; Attendance: 100; Referee: Emirjon Sino

10 April 2016 29	Tirana	1–0	Laçi	Tirana
19:00 CET	El. Bakaj 9'; Smajli (yellow card) 53'; Malaj (yellow card) 71'	Report	Buljan (yellow card) 31'; Malindi (yellow card) 58'	Stadium: Selman Stërmasi Stadium; Attendance: 400; Referee: Kreshnik Cjapi

16 April 2016 30	Bylis Ballsh	0–0	Tirana	Ballsh
16:00 CET	Peposhi (yellow card) 6'; Alla (yellow card) 48'; Varea (yellow card) 54'; Tairi (yellow card) 78'	Report	Hoxhallari (yellow card) 59'; E. Bakaj (yellow card) 78'; Teqja (yellow card) 90+4'	Stadium: Adush Muça Stadium; Referee: Kridens Meta

25 April 2016 31	Tirana	0–1	Skënderbeu Korçë	Tirana
19:30 CET (Note: The match was originally scheduled to start at 19:00, but it was postponed for 30 minute due to heavy rain.)	El. Bakaj (yellow card) 43'; Hoxhallari (yellow card) 70'	Report	Vangjeli (yellow card) 56'; Progni 74'; Hoxhallari 83' (o.g.)	Stadium: Selman Stërmasi Stadium; Attendance: 500; Referee: Bardhyl Pashaj

29 April 2016 32	Teuta Durrës	0–0	Tirana	Durrës
19:00 CET	Hila (yellow card) 72'; Lukić (yellow card) 83'	Report	Malaj (yellow card) 41'; Kërçiku (red card) 95'	Stadium: Niko Dovana Stadium; Attendance: 1,200; Referee: Enea Jorgji

4 May 2016 33	Tirana	2–2	Partizani Tirana	Tirana
18:30 CET	Muça 28' (red card) 56'; Ed. Bakaj (yellow card) 38'; El. Bakaj 47' (yellow card) 72'	Report	Sukaj 21' (yellow card) 90+3'; Atanda (yellow card) 25'; Batha (yellow card) 48'; Filipe (yellow card) 65'; Fili (yellow card) 81' (goal) 90+5'	Stadium: Selman Stërmasi Stadium; Attendance: 5,761; Referee: Lorenc Jemini

8 May 2016 34	Flamurtari Vlorë	2–1	Tirana	Vlorë
19:00 CET	Telushi 45'; Danilo Alves 68' (yellow card) 68'	Report	Papa 79'; Hoxhallari (yellow card) 89'	Stadium: Flamurtari Stadium; Attendance: 1,500; Referee: Remzi Sadiku

14 May 2016 35	Tirana	1–0	Vllaznia Shkodër	Tirana
17:30 CET	El. Bakaj 51'; Kërçiku (yellow card) 69'	Report	Pjeshka (yellow card) 19'	Stadium: Selman Stërmasi Stadium; Attendance: 20; Referee: Eldorjan Hamiti

18 May 2016 36	Kukësi	2–1	Tirana	Kukës
17:00 CET	Jean Carioca (yellow card) 19'; Emini 65', 82'; Mici (yellow card) 77'; Memini (yellow card) 79'	Report	Deliaj (yellow card) 16'; El. Bakaj (yellow card) 40' (goal) 83'; Vucaj (yellow card) 76' (yellow-red card) 78'	Stadium: Zeqir Ymeri Stadium; Attendance: 800; Referee: Kridens Meta

=== Albanian Cup ===
==== First round ====
16 September 2015 First leg	Erzeni Shijak	0–1	Tirana	Tirana (Note: The match was held in Skënder Halili Complex due to reconstruction of Tefik Jashari Stadium.)
15:00 CET		Report	Kadriu 82'	Stadium: Skënder Halili Complex; Attendance: 300; Referee: Altin Stefi

29 September 2015 Second leg	Tirana	2–0 (3–0 agg.)	Erzeni Shijak	Tirana
14:30 CET	Teqja 6'; Bakaj 64'	Report		Stadium: Skënder Halili Complex; Attendance: 300; Referee: Skerdi Greca

==== Second round ====
21 October 2015 First leg	Kastrioti Krujë	1–5	Tirana	Krujë
14:30 CET	Raboshta 37' (pen.)	Report	Kërçiku 6'; Fukui 14'; Vucaj 31'; Gilberto 47', 86'	Stadium: Kastrioti Stadium; Attendance: 0 (Note: The match was played behind the doors closed.); Referee: Eldorjan Hamiti

4 November 2015 Second leg	Tirana	2–1 (7–2 agg.)	Kastrioti Krujë	Tirana
14:00 CET	Lika 11'; Halili 55' (pen.)	Report	Lekaj 79'	Stadium: Skënder Halili Complex; Attendance: 200; Referee: Olsion Yzeiraj

==== Quarter-final ====
24 January 2016 First leg	Flamurtari Vlorë	0–1	Tirana	Vlorë
17:00 CET		Report	Malaj 87'	Stadium: Flamurtari Stadium

17 February 2016 First leg	Tirana	1–2 (2–2 agg.)	Flamurtari Vlorë	Tirana
13:30 CET	Fukui 47'; Hoxhallari (yellow card) 71' (yellow-red card) 76'; Teqja (yellow card) 61' (yellow-red card) 81'	Report	Telushi 16'; Pashaj (yellow card) 24'; Lushtaku 67'; Idrizi (yellow card) 87'; Greca (yellow card) 88'; Lacoste (yellow card) 90+3'	Stadium: Selman Stërmasi Stadium; Attendance: 1,000; Referee: Laver Alla

== Statistics ==
=== Squad stats ===
	League	Cup	Total Stats
Games played	36	6	42
Games won	13	5	18
Games drawn	14	0	14
Games lost	9	1	10
Goals scored	37	12	49
Goals conceded	25	4	29
Goal difference	12	8	20
Clean sheets	19	3	21

Last updated: 19 May 2016
Source: Soccerway

=== Top scorers ===
No.	Pos.	Nation	Name	Kategoria Superiore	Albanian Cup	Total
19	FW	(Albania)	Elis Bakaj	14	1	15
4	DF	(Albania)	Gentian Muça	5	0	5
17	MF	(Albania)	Gjergji Muzaka	4	0	4
99	FW	(Japan)	Masato Fukui	2	2	4
7	MF	(Albania)	Gilman Lika	2	1	3
5	DF	(Serbia)	Dejan Karan	2	0	2
10	MF	(Albania)	Erjon Vucaj	1	1	2
14	FW	(Brazil)	Gilberto Fortunato	0	2	2
#	Own goals			2	0	2
2	DF	(Albania)	Dritan Smajli	1	0	1
3	MF	(Albania)	Enriko Papa	1	0	1
9	FW	(Albania)	Grend Halili	0	1	1
13	MF	(Albania)	Erando Karabeci	1	0	1
14	FW	(Brazil)	Hugo Almeida	1	0	1
18	DF	(Albania)	Dorian Kërçiku	0	1	1
21	MF	(Albania)	Olsi Teqja	0	1	1
23	MF	(Kosovo)	Argjend Malaj	0	1	1
24	FW	(North Macedonia)	Florian Kadriu	0	1	1
25	MF	(Albania)	Majkel Peci	1	0	1
TOTAL				37	12	49

Last updated: 19 May 2016

=== Clean sheets ===
The list is sorted by shirt number when total appearances are equal.

Rnk	No.	Player	Kategoria Superiore	Albanian Cup	Total
1	31	(Albania) Edvan Bakaj	17	3	20
2	1	(Albania) Stivi Frashëri	2	0	2
3	12	(Albania) Marsel Çaka	0	0	0
TOTALS			19	3	22

Last updated: 19 May 2016.
Source: Soccerway
