= Martin Kavdanski =

Bulgarian footballer

Personal information
- Full name: Martin Nikolaev Kavdanski
- Date of birth: 13 February 1987 (age 39)
- Place of birth: Dupnitsa, Bulgaria
- Height: 1.83 m (6 ft 0 in)
- Position: Centre-back

Youth career
- Levski Sofia

Senior career*
Years	Team	Apps	(Gls)
2004–2005	Levski Sofia	0	(0)
2005–2007	Metz	27	(0)
2007–2010	Slavia Sofia	54	(4)
2010	→ Lokomotiv Mezdra (loan)	10	(0)
2010–2011	Lokomotiv Plovdiv	25	(3)
2012	Beroe Stara Zagora	0	(0)
2012–2013	Lokomotiv Plovdiv	23	(3)
2013	Chernomorets Burgas	13	(1)
2014	Shkëndija	5	(1)
2015	Marek Dupnitsa	12	(0)
2015	Tirana	4	(0)
2016	Lokomotiv Plovdiv	1	(0)
2016–2017	Lokomotiv GO	29	(0)
2017–2018	Clermont Foot	13	(0)
2017–2018	Clermont Foot II	4	(1)
2019	Botev Vratsa	10	(2)
2019–2022	Tsarsko Selo	75	(5)
2022–2023	Botev Vratsa	36	(1)
2024–2025	Marek Dupnitsa	54	(4)
Total		395	(25)

International career
2005–2006	Bulgaria U19	12	(3)
- * Club domestic league appearances and goals

Martin Nikolaev Kavdanski (Bulgarian: Мартин Николаев Кавдански; born 13 February 1987) is a former Bulgarian professional footballer who played as a centre-back.

== Club career ==
On 28 June 2015, Kavdanski signed a one-year contract with the most successful club in Albania, KF Tirana, taking the number 3 for the 2015–16 season. He became the third defender that was brought to Tirana during that summer, after Dritan Smajli and Ronald Gërçaliu.

Kavdanski made his official debut with Tirana on 1 November in the match against Kukësi, featuring in the last 30 minutes of the 2–1 home win. Six days later he played only four minutes in another home win, this time against the newcomers of Tërbuni Pukë.

Kavdanski started for the first time this season on 23 November in the match against Bylis Ballsh, helping the team to get a clean-sheet in a 0–1 away win. During the first part of the season he struggled to find minutes, but found it very hard, as he was not among the first choices of coach Ilir Daja, who preferred the duo Muça-Karan instead. He appeared in only six matches in the league and the cup, and eventually left the team on 25 December 2015.

Kavdanski spent the 2016–17 season at Lokomotiv Gorna Oryahovitsa; he left the club after his contract expired in June 2017.

In July 2017, Kavdanski joined Clermont Foot. In July 2020, he tested positive for COVID-19. In June 2022 Kavdanski returned to Botev Vratsa.
