= Marsel Çaka =

Albanian footballer

Personal information
- Full name: Marsel Çaka
- Date of birth: 31 March 1995 (age 31)
- Place of birth: Tirana, Albania
- Position: Goalkeeper

Team information
- Current team: FC Salzweg
- Number: 1

Youth career
- 2007–2013: KF Tirana

Senior career*
Years	Team	Apps	(Gls)
2013–2017	Tirana	22	(0)
2014–2016	Tirana B	13	(0)
2015	→ Kamza (loan)	0	(0)
2016–2017	→ Dinamo (loan)	3	(0)
2017–2018	FC Frittlingen	0	(0)
2018–2019	Union Gurten	0	(0)
2019–2020	FC Wels	17	(0)
2020–2023	1. FC Passau	26	(0)
2023–	FC Salzweg	12	(0)

International career
2013–2014	Albania U19	2	(0)
2013–2015	Albania U21	1	(0)
- * Club domestic league appearances and goals as of 15 January 2015

Marsel Çaka (born 31 March 1995) is an Albanian footballer who currently plays as a goalkeeper for FC Salzweg.

== Club career ==
Çaka is a product of the KF Tirana academy which he joined as a child, before being promoted to the senior team in January 2013 where he featured in 5 league games in the 2012–13 season. He became the club's first choice goalkeeper for the first half of the 2013–14 season at the age of just 18. The return of veteran goalkeeper Ilion Lika meant that Çaka became the second choice goalkeeper.

On 9 September, Çaka signed a long time contract with the club and was immediately loaned to Albanian First Division side Kamza for the rest of the season.

== International career ==
=== Under-19 ===
Çaka was part of the Albania U19 team selected for the 2013 Mediterranean Games in Mersin, Turkey. He featured in the last game of the tournament against Italy, coming on as a 44th-minute substitute for Aldo Teqja in the 3–1 loss for the seventh place, meaning Albania finished in last place in the tournament.

He made his international debut for Albania U19 in a 5-1 friendly win over Montenegro.

=== Under-21 ===
He received his first call up to the Albania under-21 national team in November 2013 for a European Under-21 Championship qualifier against Hungary on 14 November. He was an unused substitute in the 2–0 away win, as he was an understudy to first choice goalkeeper Aldo Teqja. He was called up to a friendly tournament held in Dubai in December 2014 where he made his debut, coming off the bench in the final game of the three game tournament against United Arab Emirates U23.
