= Olsi Teqja =

Albanian footballer

Personal information
- Date of birth: 27 July 1988 (age 38)
- Place of birth: Krujë, Albania
- Height: 1.86 m (6 ft 1 in)
- Position: Centre-back

Youth career
- 2002–2008: Olimpic

Senior career*
| Years | Team | Apps | (Gls) |
| 2008–2010 | Kastrioti Krujë | 26 | (3) |
| 2010–2011 | Apolonia Fier | 24 | (1) |
| 2011–2013 | Bylis Ballsh | 36 | (2) |
| 2013–2015 | Laçi | 50 | (0) |
| 2015–2017 | Tirana | 60 | (1) |
| 2017–2018 | Shkëndija | 16 | (0) |
| 2018–2019 | Kamza | 14 | (0) |
| 2019–2020 | Kukësi | 45 | (0) |
| 2020–2022 | Beauvais | 36 | (0) |
| 2022–2024 | Chambly | 6 | (0) |
- * Club domestic league appearances and goals

Olsi Teqja (born 27 July 1988) is an Albanian former professional footballer who played as a centre-back.

== Club career ==
=== Bylis Ballsh ===
On 22 August 2011, Teqja joined Albanian Superliga side Bylis Ballsh. He debuted for the first time in Albanian Superliga with Bylis Ballsh on 10 September 2011, playing full-90 minutes in a 5–2 thrashing of Shkumbini Peqin at Adush Muça Stadium. Later, on 17 December 2011, Teqja scored his first Bylis Ballsh goal in a 4–2 home victory against newly promoted side Tomori Berat. Bylis Ballsh ended the first part of 2011–12 season in a comfortable 6th place.

Teqja played his first match for 2012 on 11 February, playing full-90 minutes in a 1–1 away draw against Shkumbini Peqin, receiving a yellow card in the 59th minute. On 31 March, he scored against Tirana, which was proved to the lone goal of the match. Teqja ended his first season with Bylis with 29 appearances in all competitions, including 17 in league, with Bylis finishing the league in 6th place and reaching the quarter-finals of Albanian Cup.

=== Tirana ===
On 12 July 2015, Tirana completed the signing of Teqja from Laçi on a two-year contract for an undisclosed fee. He said that the move to Tirana was "a dream come true". He made his Tirana debut on 23 August in the opening league match of 2015–16 season against the newly promoted side Tërbuni Pukë, playing the entire match in a 2–1 away win. Following the end of 2016–17 season where Tirana was relegated for the first time in history, Teqja decided not to extend his contract, becoming a free agent in the process.

=== Shkëndija ===
On 16 June 2017, Teqja moved for the first time aboard by joining Shkëndija of Tetovo on a one-year contract with an option of a further one. He spent the summer playing in the qualifying rounds of UEFA Europa League, making 5 appearances as Shkëndija reached the play-offs for the second consecutive year. Teqja played his first domestic match on 21 August by starting in the 3–0 away win over Shkupi in the league's second matchday. He played 19 matches in the championship as Shkëndija was crowned champions for the second time in history; in addition he also played one cup match as Shkëndija made their way to the final, beating Pelister in the final, to win the trophy for the second time and to complete the domestic double. Following the end of the season, Teqja didn't trigger the renew option due to not agreeing on financial terms, leaving the club after only one season.

=== Kamza ===
On 4 August 2018, Teqja was presented as the newest player of Kamza, returning in Albanian top flight after only one season.

=== Kukësi ===
Kukësi announced on 31 January 2019, that Teqja had signed with the club for 18 months.

=== Beauvais ===
On 22 July 2020, French club Beauvais announced the signing of Teqja on free transfer.

== Career statistics ==
As of 15 March 2021

Club statistics
| Club | Season | League | | | Cup | | Europe | | Other | | Total | |
| Club | Season | Division | Apps | Goals | Apps | Goals | Apps | Goals | Apps | Goals | Apps | Goals |
|---|---|---|---|---|---|---|---|---|---|---|---|---|
| Kastrioti Krujë | 2008–09 | Albanian First Division | 7 | 2 | 2 | 0 | — | | — | | 9 | 2 |
| Kastrioti Krujë | 2009–10 | Albanian Superliga | 19 | 1 | 1 | 0 | — | | — | | 20 | 1 |
| Kastrioti Krujë | Total | | 26 | 3 | 3 | 0 | — | | — | | 29 | 3 |
| Apolonia Fier | 2010–11 | Albanian First Division | 24 | 1 | 0 | 0 | — | | — | | 24 | 1 |
| Bylis Ballsh | 2011–12 | Albanian Superliga | 17 | 2 | 13 | 1 | — | | — | | 30 | 3 |
| Bylis Ballsh | 2012–13 | Albanian Superliga | 19 | 0 | 10 | 0 | — | | — | | 29 | 0 |
| Bylis Ballsh | Total | | 36 | 2 | 23 | 1 | — | | — | | 59 | 3 |
| Laçi | 2013–14 | Albanian Superliga | 22 | 0 | 5 | 0 | 0 | 0 | 1 (Note: Appearance in Albanian Supercup) | 0 | 28 | 0 |
| Laçi | 2014–15 | Albanian Superliga | 28 | 0 | 7 | 0 | 4 (Note: All appearance(s) in UEFA Europa League) | 0 | — | | 39 | 0 |
| Laçi | 2015–16 | Albanian Superliga | 0 | 0 | 0 | 0 | 2 | 0 | — | | 2 | 0 |
| Laçi | Total | | 50 | 0 | 12 | 0 | 6 | 0 | 1 | 0 | 69 | 0 |
| Tirana | 2015–16 | Albanian Superliga | 31 | 0 | 5 | 1 | — | | — | | 36 | 1 |
| Tirana | 2016–17 | Albanian Superliga | 29 | 1 | 5 | 0 | — | | — | | 34 | 0 |
| Tirana | Total | | 60 | 1 | 10 | 1 | — | | — | | 70 | 2 |
| Shkëndija | 2017–18 | Macedonian First League | 16 | 0 | 1 | 0 | 5 | 0 | — | | 22 | 0 |
| Kamza | 2018–19 | Albanian Superliga | 14 | 0 | 2 | 1 | — | | — | | 16 | 1 |
| Kukësi | 2018–19 | Albanian Superliga | 14 | 0 | 6 | 0 | — | | — | | 20 | 0 |
| Kukësi | 2019–20 | Albanian Superliga | 31 | 0 | 3 | 0 | 2 | 0 | 1 | 0 | 37 | 0 |
| Kukësi | Total | | 45 | 0 | 9 | 0 | 2 | 0 | 1 | 0 | 57 | 0 |
| Beauvais | 2020–21 | National 2 | 9 | 0 | 4 | 0 | — | | — | | 13 | 0 |
| Career total | | | 280 | 7 | 64 | 3 | 13 | 0 | 2 | 0 | 359 | 10 |

== Honours ==
Laçi

- Albanian Cup: 2014–15

Tirana

- Albanian Cup: 2016–17

Shkëndija

- Macedonian First Football League: 2017–18
- Macedonian Football Cup: 2017–18
