= Dorian Kërçiku =

Albanian footballer

Personal information
- Date of birth: 30 July 1993 (age 33)
- Place of birth: Tirana, Albania
- Position: Midfielder

Team information
- Current team: Dinamo Tirana
- Number: 18

Youth career
- 2007–2011: Tirana

Senior career*
Years	Team	Apps	(Gls)
2011–2013	Skënderbeu	33	(1)
2013–2019	Tirana	139	(1)
2019–2020	Partizani Tirana	1	(0)
2020–2021	Laçi	15	(0)
2021–2022	Dinamo Tirana	0	(0)

International career
2010–2011	Albania U18	2	(0)
2011–2013	Albania U21	3	(0)
- * Club domestic league appearances and goals as of 1 July 2022

Dorian Kërçiku (born 30 August 1993) is an Albanian footballer. He started his career with KF Tirana in 2011, but after only three appearances he moved to Skënderbeu Korçë where he would go on to win the Albanian Superliga title twice in two years before he moved back to KF Tirana in the summer of 2013 where he has since established himself as an important first team player.

== Career ==
=== Early career ===
Kërçiku made his professional debut for KF Tirana in a Europa League second qualifying round game at home against Slovak side FC Spartak Trnava on 14 July 2011. Tirana's coach at the time Julián Rubio started Kërçiku in midfield and played him for the entire game, which ended in a goalless draw. He then played in the return fixture the following week in Slovakia where he once again started the game, but he was substituted off in 70th minute for Cameron Hepple in a game that ended in a 3–1 loss for KF Tirana. His next game was the 2011 Albanian Supercup against Skënderbeu Korçë where he started on the bench but was brought on at half time in the 1–0 win for KF Tirana thanks to a Bekim Balaj winner.

=== Skënderbeu ===
He left KF Tirana and signed for reigning Albanian Superliga champions Skënderbeu Korçë in the last few hours of the summer transfer window, and he was seen as the man to play behind striker Daniel Xhafa. He scored his first goal for the club on his first start against Shkumbini Peqin on 24 September 2011 in a 3–1 win where he opened the scoring in the 15th minute.

=== Return to Tirana ===
Shortly before the start of 2015–16 season, Kërçiku, when everyone thought he was going to leave, extended his contract for another season.

== Career statistics ==
As of 18 June 2015

Club	Season	League			Albanian Cup		Supercup		Europe		Total	
Club	Season	Division	Apps	Goals	Apps	Goals	Apps	Goals	Apps	Goals	Apps	Goals
KF Tirana	2011–12	Albanian Superliga	—	—	—	—	1	0	2	0	3	0
Total			—	—	—	—	1	0	2	0	3	0
Skënderbeu Korçë	2011–12	Albanian Superliga	17	1	9	1	—	—	—	—	26	2
Skënderbeu Korçë	2012–13	Albanian Superliga	16	0	9	0	1	0	1	0	27	0
Total			33	1	18	1	1	0	1	0	53	2
KF Tirana	2013–14	Albanian Superliga	26	1	4	0	—	—	—	—	30	1
KF Tirana	2014–15	Albanian Superliga	25	0	8	0	—	—	—	—	33	0
KF Tirana	2015–16	Albanian Superliga	25	0	4	0	—	—	—	—	29	0
KF Tirana	2016–17	Albanian Superliga	20	0	3	0	—	—	—	—	23	0
KF Tirana	2017–18	Albanian First Division	3	0	1	0	2	0	1	0	7	0
Total			99	1	19	1	2	0	1	0	121	2
Career total			132	2	37	1	4	0	4	0	177	3

== Honours ==
=== Club ===
Skënderbeu Korçë

- Albanian Superliga: 2011–12. 2012-13

Tirana

- Albanian First Division: 2017–18
- Albanian Cup: 2016–17
- Albanian Supercup: 2011, 2017
