= Dritan Smajli =

Albanian footballer and coach

Personal information
- Date of birth: 12 February 1985 (age 41)
- Place of birth: Lezhë, Albania
- Height: 1.84 m (6 ft 0 in)
- Position: Defender

Team information
- Current team: Besëlidhja (manager)

Youth career
- 2002–2004: Kastrioti

Senior career*
Years	Team	Apps	(Gls)
2004–2006	Kastrioti	33	(0)
2006–2008	Besëlidhja	50	(4)
2008–2013	Vllaznia	128	(11)
2013–2015	Kukësi	49	(2)
2015–2016	Tirana	22	(1)
2016–2017	Besëlidhja	22	(5)

International career
2001	Albania U17	2	(0)
2007	Albania U21	1	(0)

Managerial career
- 2018–2019: Shënkolli U17
- 2019–2022: Shënkolli
- 2022–2023: Veleçiku
- 2023–2024: Besëlidhja
- 2024–2025: Iliria
- 2026–: Iliria
- * Club domestic league appearances and goals

Dritan Smajli (born 12 February 1985) is an Albanian professional football manager and a former player who played as a defender.

== Club career ==
=== Early career ===
Having started his career with his hometown club Kastrioti Krujë as a youth player, he joined the first team in the 2004–05 season in the Albanian First Division, and he helped the side finish third in the league and achieve promotion to the Albanian Superliga in the 2005–06 season. Following the promotion winning campaign, he left the club and remained in the Albanian First Division with Besëlidhja Lezhë, who he also helped achieve promotion to the Albanian Superliga, as they finished runners up in the league, just two points behind the winners Skënderbeu Korçë. In his debut season in the Albanian Superliga, Smajli made 27 league appearances and scored twice, but he couldn't help his side fight off relegation, as they finished second from bottom and were automatically relegated to the Albanian First Division.

=== Vllaznia Shkodër ===
Smajli left Besëlidhja Lezhë following their relegation, and he joined Albanian Superliga side Vllaznia Shkodër in the summer of 2008, where he made an immediate impact in defence and helped his side challenge for the title, as they finished in second place, four points behind the champions Tirana. He also helped Vllaznia Shkodër reach the semi-finals of the Albanian Cup, as they narrowly lost to Tirana 1–0 on aggregate after extra time over two legs. He made his European debut in the UEFA Cup first qualifying round on 17 July 2008 against Slovenian side Koper. He started in defence and played the full 90 minutes in a game that finished in a 2–1 away win for Vllaznia Shkodër thanks to a brace by Xhevahir Sukaj. He also started the return leg at the Loro Boriçi Stadium, but was substituted off in the 80th minute for Suad Liçi, in a game which ended in a goalless draw as Vllaznia Shkodër progressed to the second qualifying round.

On 7 February 2012, Smajli agreed a contract extension with Vllaznia Shkodër, with the new deal set to expiring at the end of 2012–13 season.

=== Kukesi ===
After five seasons in Shkodër, Smajli left the team and joined fellow Albanian Superliga side Kukesi on a one-year contract, taking the vacant number 2 in the process. On 22 May 2015, Smajli announced his departure from Kukesi by terminating his contract by mutual consensus, ending his spell with 64 appearances in all competitions and 2 goals.

=== Tirana ===
In June 2015, Smajli joined Tirana as a free transfer, following his departure from Kukesi. He was presented to the media on 26 June where he signed a two-year deal along with other defender Ronald Gërçaliu. Smajli made his competitive debut in the team's opening league match of 2015–16 season against the newcomers of Tërbuni Pukë on 23 August, playing full-90 minutes in an eventual 2–1 away win.

=== Besëlidhja ===
In July 2016, after 8 years playing for Albanian Superliga teams he decided to return to his hometown signing for Albanian First Division side Besëlidhja Lezhë to help the team reach the promotion to Albanian Superliga.

== International career ==
Smajli has represented Albania in U17 and U21 teams, making three appearances in total. He made his competitive debut with U17 team on 24 September 2001 in the qualifying round match of UEFA European Under-17 Championship against Croatia in an eventual 5–2 away defeat.
