= Masato Fukui =

Japanese footballer

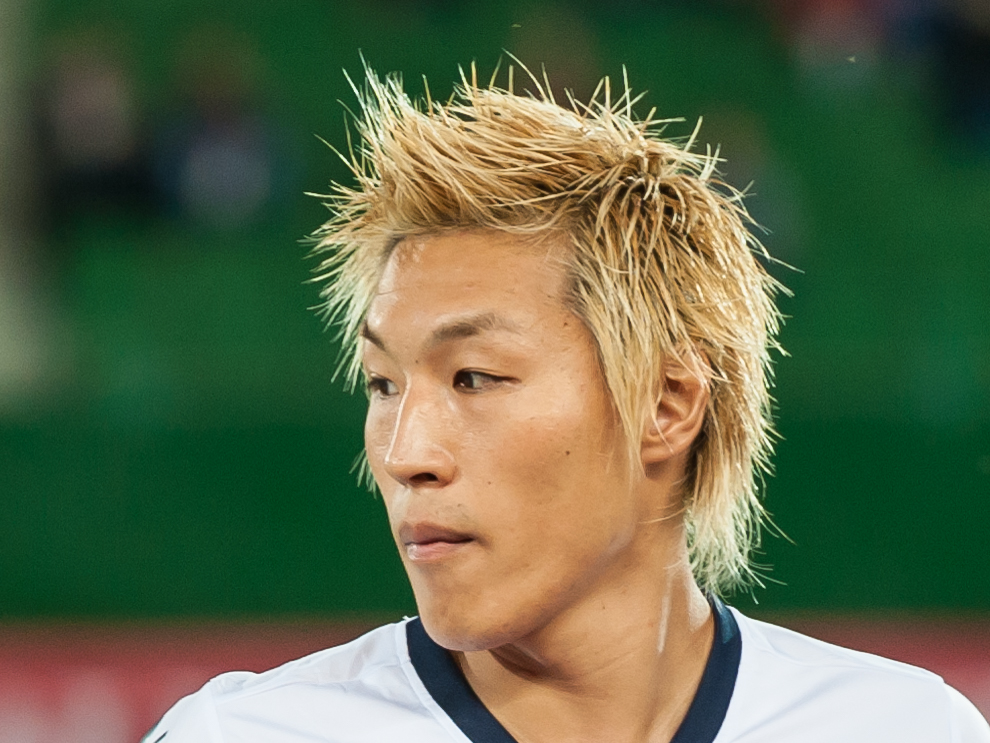

Personal information
- Full name: Masato Fukui
- Date of birth: November 14, 1988 (age 37)
- Place of birth: Tottori, Japan
- Height: 1.77 m (5 ft 10 in)
- Position: Striker

Youth career
- –2000: Umbigo FC
- 2001–2003: FC Camino
- 2004–2006: Tottori Chuo Ikuei High School

College career
Years	Team	Apps	(Gls)
2007–2010	Nippon Bunri University		

Senior career*
Years	Team	Apps	(Gls)
2011–2012	Gainare Tottori	38	(5)
2012–2013	Home United	13	(0)
2013–2015	Sutjeska Nikšić	60	(12)
2015–2016	Tirana	34	(2)
2016–2017	Skënderbeu Korçë	14	(0)
2016	→ Kukësi (loan)	2	(0)
2017–2019	Kamza	51	(5)
Total		212	(24)
- * Club domestic league appearances and goals as of 15 September 2018

Masato Fukui (福井 理人, Fukui Masato; born November 14, 1988) is a Japanese professional footballer who plays as a striker for Albanian club Kamza.

== Club career ==
=== Gainare Tottori ===
In 2011, he joined Gainare Tottori in J2 League, on 6 March 2011 he made his first appearance for the team.

=== Home United ===
In 2013 the striker signed for Home United on a free transfer. He played thirteen games in the S.League without scoring.

=== Sutjeska Nikšić ===
On 26 July 2013, Fukui signed for Montenegrin First League side Sutjeska Nikšić on a free transfer. He made his debut on 10 August, scoring in a 2–0 win over Mornar. He scored a goal from 70 metres against FK Mladost for 2–0 win.

=== Tirana ===
On 16 July 2015, Fukui joined Albanian Superliga side Tirana on a free transfer, signing a one-year contract and becoming the first Japanese player to sign for an Albanian club. In his unofficial debut on 22 July, he came on the field and scored twice to lead his team into a 2–1 win against Mladost Carev Dvor in the first match of the preparation phase in Macedonia.

On 23 August 2015, in the Tirana's opening match of the 2015–16 season against the newcomers of Tërbuni Pukë, Fukui gave an assist for Gilman Lika to score an equalizer, which ended Tërbuni's superiority, and then scored the winning goal in the 68th minute, giving Tirana a 1–2 away win.

=== Skënderbeu Korçë ===
On 21 June 2016, Fukui signed a two-year contract with fellow Albanian Superliga side Skënderbeu Korçë after he couldn't reach an argument with Tirana for the new deal. Due to Skënderbeu's ban from European football over match-fixing allegations, on 10 July, Fukui was sent on loan at Kukësi for their European campaign along with teammates Liridon Latifi and Sabjen Lilaj.

Four days later, he played 82 minutes in the first leg of UEFA Europa League second qualifying round against Austria Wien which ended in a 1–0 defeat. He also featured 61 minutes in the second leg at Elbasan Arena as the match finished in a 1–4 defeat, which confirmed Kukësi elimination from the competition with the aggregate 1–5.

After Kukësi's elimination, Fukui returned to Skënderbeu along with his teammates, and made his first appearance on 25 August in the 2016 Albanian Supercup, scoring the temporary equalizer with a header in an eventual 1–3 defeat to Kukësi at Selman Stërmasi Stadium. He made his first league appearance in the opening matchday on 7 September by playing full-90 minutes against Flamurtari Vlorë in an eventual 2–1 home win. After playing as a starter in the first matches, Fukui lost his place by the beginning of November, recording 94 minutes until January. In January, the new manager convinced him to stay for the second part of season, but nevertheless, he played only two league matches.

=== Kamza ===
On 3 August 2017, after a failed season at Skënderbeu, Fukui signed for newly promoted side Kamza as a free agent. He wasn't part of the team during their winter training camp in Antalya, Turkey due to having visa problems; he instead trained with Kastrioti Krujë and played in one friendly.

Fukui was one of the most used players in the Kamza squad during the 2017–18 season, making 33 league appearances, scoring no goals as the team avoided relegation only in the final matchday. He left the club initially during the summer transfer window, and also claiming that the club had not paid him correctly, however, on 31 August he returned and signed a contract for the 2018–19 season.

He scored his league goal of in his first appearance the new season on 15 September against Kastrioti Krujë, netting the second to help the team win 2–0.

== Club statistics ==
As of 15 September 2018

Club	Season	League			Cup		Continental		Total	
Club	Season	Division	Apps	Goals	Apps	Goals	Apps	Goals	Apps	Goals
Gainare Tottori	2011	J2 League	11	3	1	0	—		12	3
Gainare Tottori	2012	J2 League	27	2	0	0	—		27	2
Gainare Tottori	Total		38	5	1	0	—		39	5
Home United	2013	S.League	13	0	1	0	—		14	0
Sutjeska Nikšić	2013–14	Montenegrin First League	30	7	0	0	—		30	7
Sutjeska Nikšić	2014–15	Montenegrin First League	30	5	4	0	2 (Note: All appearance(s) in UEFA Champions League)	0	36	5
Sutjeska Nikšić	2015–16	Montenegrin First League	—		—		2 (Note: All appearance(s) in UEFA Europa League)	1	2	1
Sutjeska Nikšić	Total		60	12	4	0	4	1	68	13
Tirana	2015–16	Albanian Superliga	34	2	3	2	—		37	4
Skënderbeu Korçë	2016–17	Albanian Superliga	14	0	4 (Note: One appearance and one goal in Albanian Supercup)	1	0	0	18	1
Kukësi (loan)	2016–17	Albanian Superliga	—		—		2	0	2	0
Kamza	2017–18	Albanian Superliga	33	0	2	0	—		35	0
Kamza	2018–19	Albanian Superliga	1	1	1	0	—		2	1
Kamza	Total		34	1	3	0	—		37	1
Career total			193	20	16	3	6	1	216	24

== Honours ==
Sutjeska

- Montenegrin First League: 2013–14
