= Alex Willian =

Brazilian footballer (born 1988)

Personal information
- Full name: Alex Willian Costa e Silva
- Date of birth: 18 March 1988 (age 38)
- Place of birth: Piquete, Brazil
- Height: 1.81 m (5 ft 11 in)
- Position: Attacking midfielder

Youth career
- 2005–2007: Santos

Senior career*
Years	Team	Apps	(Gls)
2008	Santos	3	(0)
2008	Bragantino		
2009	Atlético Paranaense		
2009	Botafogo-SP	2	(0)
2009–2010	Olé Brasil	0	(0)
2009	→ Guarani (loan)	2	(0)
2010	→ Oeste (loan)	5	(0)
2011	Oeste	8	(0)
2012	Catanduvense	17	(1)
2012	Paysandu	6	(0)
2013	Red Bull Brasil	2	(0)
2013	Atlético Sorocaba	8	(0)
2013	Icasa	7	(1)
2013	CRB	3	(2)
2014	Atlético Sorocaba	7	(1)
2014–2015	CRB	7	(2)
2015	Cuiabá	12	(7)
2016	Tirana B	1	(0)
2016	Cuiabá	2	(0)
2017	Mumbai FC	6	(0)
2017	XV de Piracicaba	10	(2)
2018	Caxias	8	(1)
- * Club domestic league appearances and goals as of 16 January 2018

Alex Willian Costa e Silva (born 18 March 1988 in Piquete, São Paulo), known as Alex Willian, is a Brazilian former footballer who played as an attacking midfielder.

== Career ==
Alex Willian made his professional debut for Santos in the Campeonato Paulista against Bragantino on 27 January 2008.

=== Mumbai FC ===
He signed for Mumbai FC in February 2017. He made his debut against Mohun Bagan in the league at the Cooperage.

== Honours ==
- São Paulo State Championship (U 20): 2007
