= Anxhelo Mumajesi =

Albanian footballer

Personal information
- Date of birth: 28 March 1997 (age 29)
- Place of birth: Tirana, Albania
- Height: 1.75 m (5 ft 9 in)
- Position: Attacking midfielder

Youth career
- 2009–2016: Tirana

Senior career*
Years	Team	Apps	(Gls)
2016–2017	Tirana	1	(0)
2016	Tirana B	1	(0)
2016–2017	→ Sopoti (loan)	24	(3)
2017–2019	Kamza	36	(0)
2019–2020	Hessen Dreieich	3	(0)

International career
2017	Albania U21		
- * Club domestic league appearances and goals as of 00:43, 12 June 2024 (UTC)

Anxhelo Mumajesi (born 25 March 1997) is an Albanian professional footballer who plays as an attacking midfielder.

== Club career ==
=== Early career ===
Mumajesi started his youth career with KF Tirana in 2011. In the start of 2016 he was promoted in the first team of KF Tirana by coach Ilir Daja.

=== Kamza ===
In August 2017 Mumajesi signed a three-year contract with FC Kamza becoming the 9th arrival in the just promoted Albanian Superliga team.

=== Hessen Dreieich ===
On 11 September 2019, German Hessenliga club SC Hessen Dreieich confirmed, that Mumajesi had joined the club on a contract for the 2019–20 season. He left the club at the end of the season.

== International career ==
Mumajesi received his first international call up at the Albania national under-21 football team by coach Alban Bushi for a gathering between 14 and 17 May 2017 with most of the players selected from Albanian championships.

He received his first call up for the Albania under-20 side by coach Alban Bushi for the double friendly match against Azerbaijan U-21 on 21 & 26 January 2018.

== Career statistics ==
=== Club ===
As of 22 December 2017

Appearances and goals by club, season and competition
Club	Season	League			Cup		Europe (Note: Includes UEFA Champions League and UEFA Europa League)		Other (Note: Includes 2016–17 Albanian First Division play-out)		Total	
Club	Season	Division	Apps	Goals	Apps	Goals	Apps	Goals	Apps	Goals	Apps	Goals
Tirana	2015–16	Albanian Superliga	1	0	—		—		—		1	0
Tirana B	2015–16	Albanian Second Division	1	0	—		—		—		1	0
Sopoti Librazhd	2016–17	Albanian First Division	24	3	2	0	—		1	0	27	3
Kamza	2017–18	Albanian Superliga]	14	0	3	1	—		—		17	1
Career total			40	3	5	1	—		1	0	46	4
