= Argjend Malaj =

Kosovar footballer (born 1993)

Personal information
- Full name: Argjend Malaj
- Date of birth: 16 October 1993 (age 33)
- Place of birth: Vushtrri, FR Yugoslavia
- Height: 1.86 m (6 ft 1 in)
- Position: Central midfielder

Team information
- Current team: Rosengård 1917
- Number: 10

Youth career
- 2004–2012: KEK

Senior career*
Years	Team	Apps	(Gls)
2012–2014	Prishtina	15	(1)
2014–2016	Tirana	54	(0)
2016–2018	Skënderbeu	9	(0)
2018–2019	Kamza	33	(0)
2019–2021	Feronikeli	33	(2)
2021–2022	Ballkani	11	(0)
2022	Ljungskile SK	16	(3)
2023–2024	Trollhättan	55	(14)
2025–	Rosengård 1917	58	(13)

International career
2013–2014	Kosovo U21	1	(0)
- * Club domestic league appearances and goals as of 16 November 2026

Argjend Malaj (born 16 October 1993) is a Kosovar professional footballer who plays as a central midfielder for Swedish side Rosengård 1917.

== Club career ==
=== Prishtina ===
Malaj joined FC Prishtina in the summer transfer window of 2013 from KF KEK at the age of 18 and he joined the first team at the club. In April, he went on a short trial with German giants Borussia Dortmund before returning to FC Prishtina to finish off the season with 15 league appearances and one goal.

=== Tirana ===
He signed a one-year contract with Albanian Superliga club Tirana on 3 July 2014, with the option of another year at the end of the season. He moved on a free transfer and his reported salary would be in the region of €24,000 and €30,000 a year. He made his debut with the club on the opening day of the 2014–15 Albanian Superliga campaign in a home tie against newly promoted side Apolonia Fier. Malaj came on as a 67th-minute substitute for forward Mario Morina in a game that ended in a 3–0 win. He made his first start for the club on 11 September against Vllaznia Shkodër, in a 1–1 draw which was infamously marred by crowd trouble which saw 13 people arrested and both clubs' fans receiving lengthy stadium bans.

Malaj scored his first goal with Tirana on 24 January 2016, a match-winner against Flamurtari Vlorë in the first leg of the 2015–16 Albanian Cup's quarter-final. He left the team in June 2016 after couldn't reach an argument with the club directors for the new contract.

=== Skënderbeu Korçë ===
On 24 June, Malaj officially joined Skënderbeu Korçë on a free transfer, signing a contract until June 2019. He was presented on the same day along with Hektor Idrizaj. On 6 May 2017, during the league match against Vllaznia Shkodër at home, Malaj suffered an injury and was taken off the field by stretcher as the match finished 4–3 for the home side. Following the examinations, it was reported that Malaj had injured his left leg's ligament which requires surgery, ending thus his season. He successfully underwent surgery on 13 May.

== International career ==
Malaj has expressed his desire to represent Albania internationally. Due to fierce competition, he was called up and decided to play for Kosovo.
