= Senad Sallaku =

Albanian footballer

Personal information
- Date of birth: 8 October 1995 (age 31)
- Place of birth: Tirana, Albania
- Height: 1.80 m (5 ft 11 in)
- Position: Midfielder

Team information
- Current team: SV Schalding-Heining
- Number: 44

Youth career
- 2011–2012: Tirana
- 2012–2013: Dinamo Tirana
- 2013–2014: Besa Kavajë

Senior career*
Years	Team	Apps	(Gls)
2013–2015	Besa	6	(0)
2015–2016	Tirana	0	(0)
2016–2017	Dinamo Tirana	12	(1)
2018–2019	FC Frittlingen		
2019–2020	FC Wels		
2020–2022	1. FC Passau		
2022–2024	Union Esternberg		
2024–	SV Schalding-Heining	3	(0)

International career^{‡}
2011–2012	Albania U17	1	(0)
- * Club domestic league appearances and goals as of 00:10, 12 June 2024 (UTC) ‡ National team caps and goals as of 9 March 2016

Senad Sallaku (born 8 October 1995) is an Albanian footballer who plays as a midfielder for SV Schalding-Heining.

== Club career ==
Sallaku was born in Tirana. He was promoted to the senior team at KF Tirana by coach Shkëlqim Muça during the 2015–16 season where he made his professional debut in the friendly against KS Bylis. He signed a four–year contract with KF Tirana on 25 July 2015, keeping him at the club until 2018.
