= Salzweg =

- Municipality
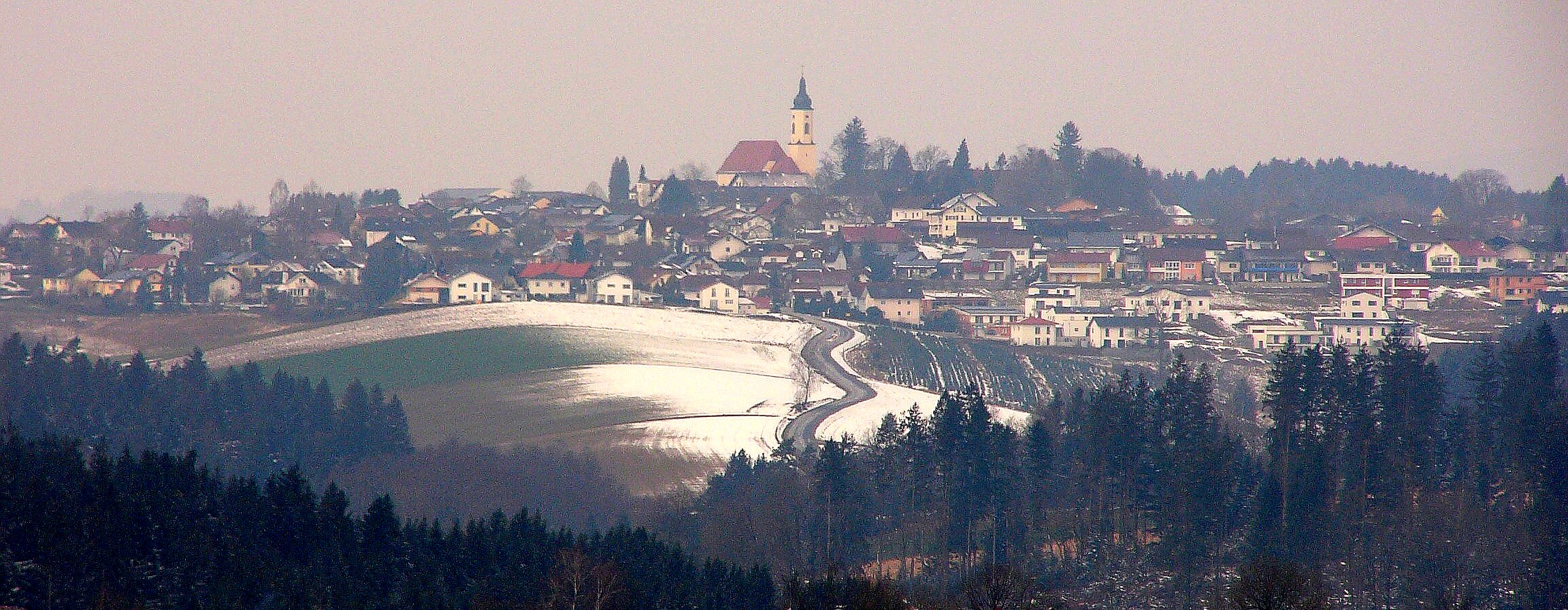
- Panorama of Salzweg

- Coat of arms

- Location of Salzweg within Passau district
- Interactive map of Salzweg
- Location within Germany Location within Bavaria
- Coordinates: 48°37′N 13°29′E
- Country: Germany
- State: Bavaria
- Admin. region: Niederbayern
- District: Passau

Government
  - Mayor (2020–26): Josef Putz (FW)

Area
  - Total: 31.91 km^{2} (12.32 sq mi)
- Elevation: 452 m (1,483 ft)

Population (2025-12-31)
  - Total: 6,506
  - Density: 203.9/km^{2} (528.1/sq mi)
- Time zone: UTC+01:00 (CET)
  - Summer (DST): UTC+02:00 (CEST)
- Postal codes: 94121
- Dialling codes: 0851
- Vehicle registration: PA
- Website: www.salzweg.de

Salzweg is a municipality in the district of Passau in Bavaria in Germany. It is located near the German border with Austria.
