= Dejan Karan =

Serbian footballer (born 1988)

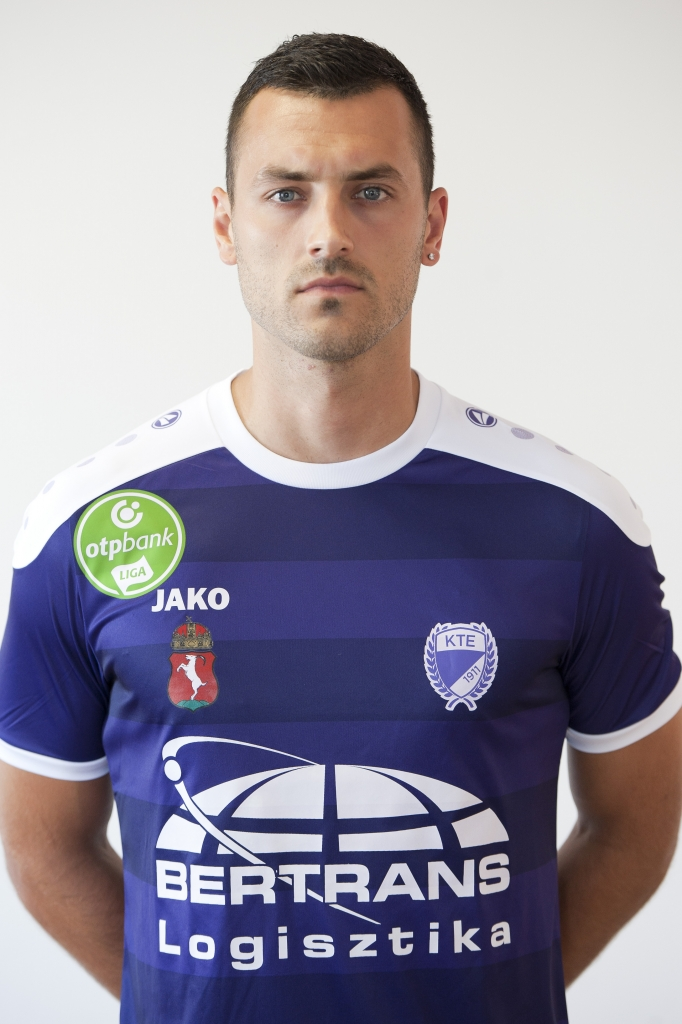
- Karan with Kecskemét in 2016

Personal information
- Date of birth: 13 August 1988 (age 38)
- Place of birth: Novi Sad, SFR Yugoslavia
- Height: 1.90 m (6 ft 3 in)
- Position: Centre-back

Youth career
- –2006: Vojvodina

Senior career*
Years	Team	Apps	(Gls)
2006–2013	Vojvodina	35	(0)
2006–2007	→ Sloga Temerin (loan)	13	(1)
2007	→ Proleter Novi Sad (loan)	8	(1)
2007–2008	→ Mladost Podgorica (loan)	22	(0)
2008	→ Palić (loan)	13	(0)
2009	→ Novi Sad (loan)	13	(0)
2012	→ Javor Ivanjica (loan)	1	(0)
2013	→ Voždovac (loan)	16	(1)
2013–2015	Kecskemét	60	(1)
2015–2016	Tirana	25	(2)
2016–2022	Diósgyőr	101	(6)
- * Club domestic league appearances and goals

Dejan Karan (Serbian Cyrillic: Дејан Каран; Hungarian: Karan Dejan; born 13 August 1988) is a Serbian former footballer with Hungarian nationality who played as a centre-back.

== Career ==
=== Early career ===
Karan played for Serbian SuperLiga clubs Vojvodina, Javor Ivanjica, Voždovac and Mladost Podgorica from Montenegro. From 10 July 2013, he signed for Kecskemét from Hungary, where he stayed two years until 31 July 2015.

=== Tirana ===
On 25 August 2015, Karan signed with the most successful club of Albania, Tirana, on a one-year deal with an option to renew it for another year. During his presentation, he said that his compatriot Ivan Gvozdenović had told to him "many good words for the club" and that he has heard that Tirana is the best Albanian club in history. He was given the number 5.

=== Diósgyőr ===
Karan signed his first contract with Diósgyőr on 10 July 2016 and this is his second time that he play in Hungary. One and a half seasons in Diósgyőr was enough to become standard player in this team and 17 January 2018, Karan signed new two years contract with this Hungarian football club. Karan after two and half years got Hungarian nationality. At the start of his four seasons in this club he became also captain of this team. Second time, Karan extended his contract 20 December 2019 for a new two years. Karan retired from playing at the end of the 2021–22 season.
