= Ronald Gërçaliu =

Albanian-born Austrian footballer

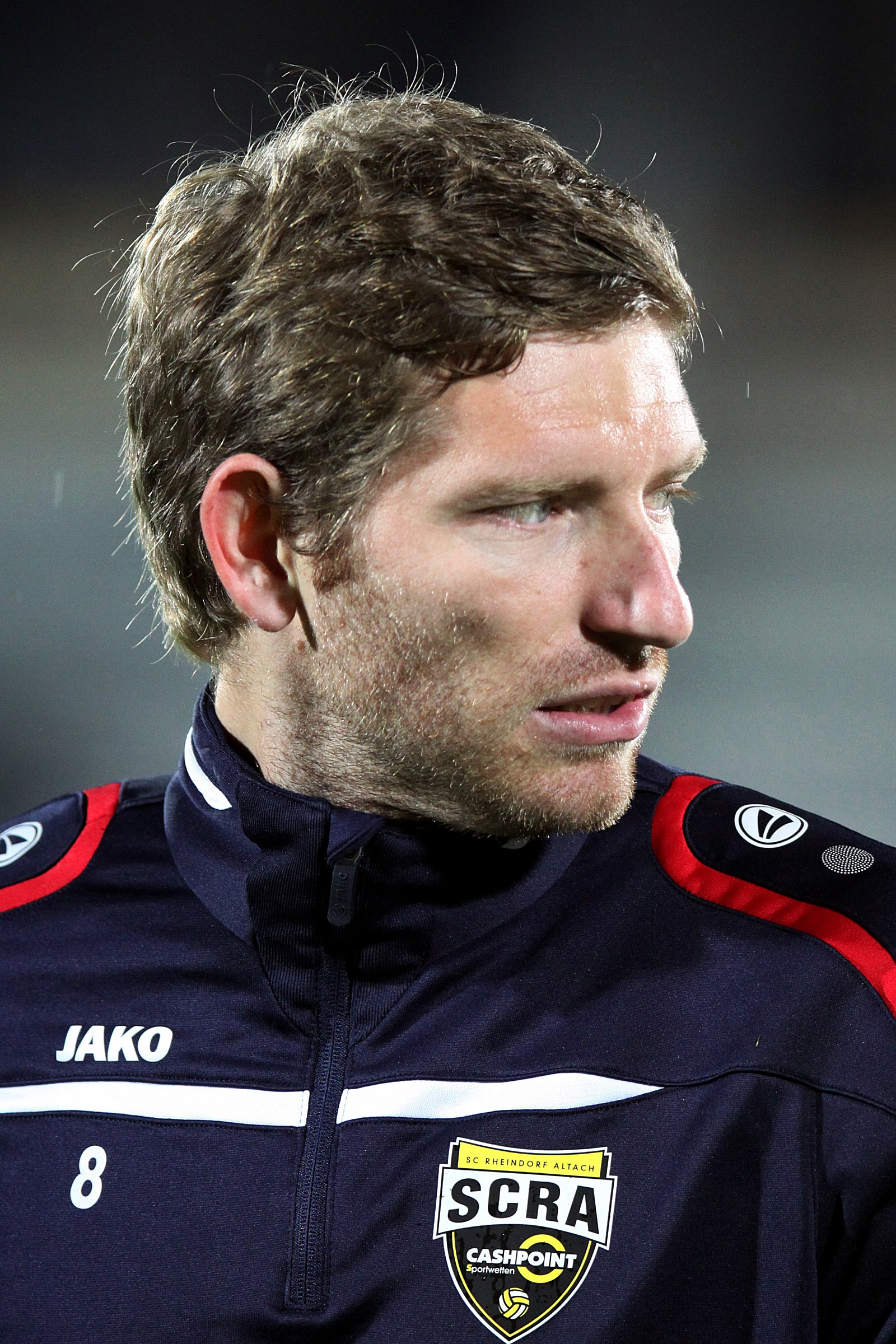
- Gërçaliu with Rheindorf Altach in 2014

Personal information
- Date of birth: 12 February 1986 (age 40)
- Place of birth: Tirana, Albania
- Height: 1.81 m (5 ft 11 in)
- Position: Left-back

Team information
- Current team: FC Kufstein
- Number: 20

Youth career
- 1995–1997: Partizani Tirana
- 1998–2004: Sturm Graz

Senior career*
Years	Team	Apps	(Gls)
2004–2006	Sturm Graz	46	(0)
2006–2009	Red Bull Salzburg	25	(0)
2006	→ Sturm Graz (loan)	12	(0)
2007–2008	→ Austria Wien (loan)	43	(1)
2009–2010	Wiener Neustadt	24	(0)
2010–2012	Ingolstadt 04	4	(0)
2012	ŁKS Łódź	12	(1)
2012–2014	Erzgebirge Aue	9	(0)
2014	Universitatea Cluj	8	(0)
2014–2015	Rheindorf Altach	17	(0)
2015–2016	Tirana	24	(0)
2017–2019	Schwaz	56	(8)
2019–2020	Imst	13	(1)
2020–2025	Kufstein	115	(14)

International career
2005–2008	Austria	14	(0)
- * Club domestic league appearances and goals as of 28 December 2024

Ronald Gërçaliu (German: Ronald Gercaliu, pronounced [ˈʁoːnalt ˈɡɛʁtsali̯u]; born 12 February 1986) is a professional footballer who plays as a left-back for FC Kufstein. Born in Albania, he chose to play for Austria after being called up by Hans Krankl in 2005.

== Club career ==
Born in Tirana but moved to Austria in 1997, Gërçaliu came up through the ranks at Sturm Graz, becoming first-team mainstay in 2004–05 season and also played professionally for Salzburg and Austria Wien. In summer 2008 he rejoined Salzburg after only one and a half season at Austria Wien. On 28 June 2009, it was announced that Gërçaliu signed with Wiener Neustadt for the new season. After one season he left Wiener Neustadt and signed for German club FC Ingolstadt. On 3 January 2014, he signed a two-year contract with Universitatea Cluj and, after a season playing for Rheindorf Altach, in July 2015 he signed a contract with KF Tirana, the team of the city where he was born.

== International career ==
He chose to play for Austria after being called up by Hans Krankl in 2005 and then made his debut for Austria in an August 2005 friendly match against Scotland and was a participant at Euro 2008.

== Honours ==
Austria Wien

- Austrian Cup: 2006–07

Red Bull Salzburg

- Austrian Bundesliga: 2008–09
