= Elvis Sina =

Albanian footballer

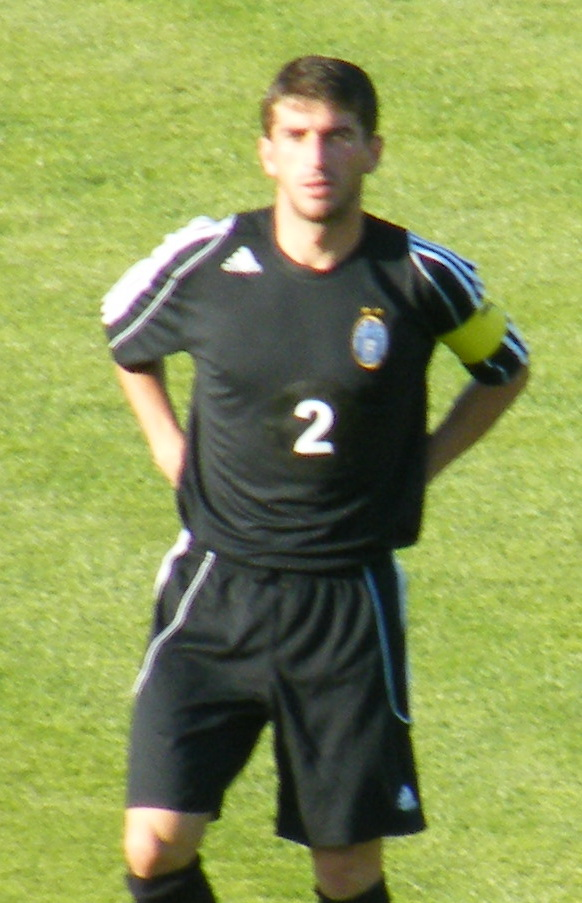

Personal information
- Full name: Elvis Sina
- Date of birth: 14 November 1978 (age 47)
- Place of birth: Tirana, Albania
- Height: 1.67 m (5 ft 6 in)
- Position: Defender

Senior career*
Years	Team	Apps	(Gls)
1996–2006	Tirana	261	(8)
2006–2007	Elbasani	25	(1)
2007–2008	Tirana	24	(0)
2008–2009	Dinamo Tirana	30	(0)
2009–2014	Tirana	107	(0)
Total		447	(9)

International career^{‡}
1994	Albania U16	2	(0)
1996	Albania U18	2	(0)
1997–1999	Albania U21	11	(0)
2002–2005	Albania	5	(0)
- * Club domestic league appearances and goals as of 15 June 2012 ‡ National team caps and goals as of 20 May 2010

Elvis Sina (born 14 November 1978) is an Albanian former soccer-player. He has successfully played for Tirana in the Albanian Superliga, and for the Albania national team. He began his career as a midfielder, but as the years passed he was utilized in defence firstly as right-back and later as a center-back.

Sina is the most-capped player in the history of Tirana with more than 470 appearances in all competitions.

== Club career ==
Sina began his professional career with Tirana in 1996 and by the age of 19 he became a key first team player, helping his side win the Albanian Superliga 6 times, Albanian Cup 4 times and Albanian Supercup 5 times. He left the club in 2006 in favour of signing with other top flight side Elbasani. With his new side Sina played 25 league matches and scored one goal, the second of a 2–0 win versus Flamurtari Vlorë. He only spent one season at Elbasani before heading back to Tirana for the 2007–08 season.

On 7 May 2008, Tirana lost the 2008 Albanian Cup Final match to Vllaznia Shkodër with Sina playing only in the first half. After the end of the match, Sina along with two teammates were suspended by the club with the suspicion of match-fixing which subsequently lead to his second departure from the club.

On 9 June 2008, Sina moved to Tirana's fierce local rivals Dinamo Tirana in the summer of 2008 where he won the Albanian Supercup in his only season at the club before once again returning to Tirana for his third stint in 2009.

Sina returned for a second time at Tirana in August 2009 by signing as a free agent. He played 27 league matches in his return season, which was cut-short in April 2010 when Sina suffered a nose injury and was forced to remain sidelined for the rest of the season.

In July 2012, ahead of the 2012–13 season, manager Julián Rubio decided to strip Sina of captaincy in favour of goalkeeper Ilion Lika.

On 8 April 2014, Sina announced that he will retired at the end of 2013–14 season at the age of 35. In the last match of the season against Besa Kavajë, Sina was set to play the last match of his career, but this did not happen because Besa Kavajë didn't appear to play, forcing FSHF to award Tirana with a 3–0 victory. However, for Sina, a farewell ceremony was held to celebrate his career, which was organised by Tirana.

In his last season, Sina played 15 matches as his side assured mathematically survival on 3 May 2014, during the 2–2 away draw against Flamurtari Vlorë, where Sina was an unused substitute.

== International career ==
Sina made his debut for the national team in a 1–1 draw against Switzerland on 12 October 2002 whilst playing for KF Tirana. He came on as a late substitute for Ervin Fakaj in the 89th minute of the game. His next international game was only 4 days away against Russia in Volgograd. Sina once again came on as a substitute but this time it was on the 60th minute mark, he replaced Fatmir Vata when the score was 4–1 to the Russians, Sina's presence on the field was shown as Russia did not manage to score again after he had entered the field.

The defender earned his next cap in a friendly against Poland on 29 May 2005. It was his first game under the guidance of new coach Hans-Peter Briegel. He came on replacing midfielder Klodian Duro in the 78th minute of the game. Sina's next appearance was a 2006 World Cup qualifier against Denmark on 8 June 2005. Just like his first cap this one was earned through a cameo appearance as he came on in the 92nd minute for midfielder Redi Jupi.

Sina's last national team cap to date was a friendly in Tirana against Azerbaijan on 17 August 2005. Besides being his last cap, it was also his first start for the national team and the first time he had ever won an international game. He started the match in midfield and came off after an impressive game in the 90th minute for Kosovan born Armend Dallku.

== Director career ==
On 9 September 2015, Sina was named the new director of Tirana's academy following the departure of Ardian Mema, another club legend.

== Career statistics ==
=== Club ===
Club statistics
Club	Season	League			Cup		Europe		Other		Total	
Club	Season	Division	Apps	Goals	Apps	Goals	Apps	Goals	Apps	Goals	Apps	Goals
Tirana	1996–97	Albanian Superliga	7	0	0	0	—		—		7	0
Tirana	1997–98	Albanian Superliga	31	1	0	0	—		—		31	1
Tirana	1998–99	Albanian Superliga	28	1	1	0	—		—		29	1
Tirana	1999–2000	Albanian Superliga	25	2	0	0	2 (Note: All appearance(s) in UEFA Champions League)	0	—		27	2
Tirana	2000–01	Albanian Superliga	21	0	7	0	2	0	1 (Note: Appearance in Albanian Supercup)	0	31	0
Tirana	2001–02	Albanian Superliga	23	0	5	0	2 (Note: All appearance(s) in UEFA Cup)	0	1	1	31	1
Tirana	2002–03	Albanian Superliga	25	0	2	0	2	0	1	0	30	0
Tirana	2003–04	Albanian Superliga	34	4	2	1	4	0	1	1	41	6
Tirana	2004–05	Albanian Superliga	34	0	2	1	3	0	0	0	39	1
Tirana	2005–06	Albanian Superliga	33	0	1	0	4	0	1	0	39	0
Tirana	2006–07	Albanian Superliga	0	0	0	0	4	0	1	0	5	0
Tirana	Total		261	8	20	2	23	0	6	2	310	12
Elbasani	2006–07	Albanian Superliga	25	1	0	0	—		—		25	1
Tirana	2007–08	Albanian Superliga	24	0	1	0	2	0	1	0	28	0
Dinamo Tirana	2008–09	Albanian Superliga	30	0	5	0	2	0	1	0	38	0
Dinamo Tirana	2009–10	Albanian Superliga	0	0	0	0	1 (Note: All appearance(s) in UEFA Europa League)	0	—		1	0
Dinamo Tirana	Total		30	0	5	0	3	0	1	0	39	0
Tirana	2009–10	Albanian Superliga	27	0	3	0	—		—		30	0
Tirana	2010–11	Albanian Superliga	29	0	5	0	4	0	—		38	0
Tirana	2011–12	Albanian Superliga	20	0	13	0	0	0	1	0	34	0
Tirana	2012–13	Albanian Superliga	16	0	1	0	2	0	1	0	20	0
Tirana	2013–14	Albanian Superliga	15	0	2	0	—		—		17	0
Tirana	Total		107	0	24	0	6	0	2	0	136	0
Career total			447	9	50	2	34	0	10	2	538	13

=== International ===
Appearances and goals by national team and year
National team	Year	Apps	Goals
Albania	2002	2	0
Albania	2005	3	0
Total		5	0

== Honours ==
Tirana

- Albanian Superliga:(6) 1996–97, 1998–99, 1999–00, 2002–03, 2003–04, 2004–05
- Albanian Cup:(6) 1998–99, 2000–01, 2001–02, 2005–06, 2010–11, 2011–12
- Albanian Supercup:(8) 2000, 2002, 2003, 2005, 2006, 2007, 2011, 2012

Dinamo Tirana

- Albanian Supercup: 2008

Sporting positions
Preceded by Devi Muka	KF Tirana captain 2011–2012	Succeeded by Ilion Lika
Preceded by Ilion Lika	KF Tirana captain 2013	Succeeded by Erando Karabeci
