= Eldorado Merkoçi =

Albanian footballer

Eldoraldo Merkoçi
Personal information
- Date of birth: 6 January 1978 (age 48)
- Place of birth: Tirana, Albania
- Height: 1.79 m (5 ft 10 in)
- Position: Midfielder

Senior career*
Years	Team	Apps	(Gls)
1994–1999	Tirana	94	(19)
1999–2001	SV Wörgl	47	(7)
2001	Vllaznia Shkodër	0	(0)
2001–2008	Tirana	128	(21)
2003	→ Partizani (loan)	9	(2)
2007	→ Elbasani (loan)	15	(3)
Total		293	(52)

International career
1999–2001	Albania	2	(0)
- * Club domestic league appearances and goals

Eldorado Merkoçi (born 6 January 1978 in Tirana) is an Albanian retired football player. He spent most of his playing career at KF Tirana, making over 200 appearances for the club and scoring a total of 40 goals.

== Club career ==
He had a spell in Austria, playing for SV Wörgl alongside compatriot Auron Miloti in 2000.

== International career ==
He made his debut for Albania in a February 1999 friendly match against Macedonia and earned a total of 2 caps, scoring no goals. His second and final international was an April 2001 friendly match against Turkey.

== Honours ==
KF Tirana

- Albanian Superliga (7): 1994–95, 1995–96, 1996–97, 1998–99, 2003–04, 2004–05, 2006–07
- Albanian Cup: 1995–96, 1998–99, 2001–02, 2005–06
- Albanian Supercup (6): 1994, 2002, 2003, 2005, 2006, 2007
