= Albert Duro =

Albanian former footballer

Personal information
- Date of birth: 16 February 1978 (age 48)
- Place of birth: Elbasan, Albania
- Height: 1.83 m (6 ft 0 in)
- Position: Centre back

Senior career*
Years	Team	Apps	(Gls)
1996–1998	Elbasani	54	(2)
1998–2001	Steaua București	32	(0)
2001–2002	Dinamo Tirana	6	(1)
2002–2004	Național București	23	(0)
2004–2006	Tirana	32	(1)
2007	Teuta	5	(0)
2007–2010	Besa	7	(0)
Total		159	(4)

International career^{‡}
1999–2000	Albania	5	(0)
- * Club domestic league appearances and goals as of 19 January 2015 ‡ National team caps and goals as of 19 January 2015

Albert Duro (born 16 February 1978) is an Albanian former footballer who played as a Centre back.

He spent the majority of his club career in Albania and Romania, representing Elbasani, Steaua București, Dinamo Tirana, Național București, Tirana, Teuta Durrës and Besa Kavajë. During his time in Romania, he won the Liga I title in the 2000–01 season with Steaua București and the Cupa României in 1998–99. In Albania, he won multiple domestic honors including three Superliga titles, an Albanian Cup and three Supercups.

Internationally, Duro earned five caps for the Albania national team between 1999 and 2000, making his debut against Norway.

He is the younger brother of Klodian Duro who was also a footballer.

== Club career ==
Albert Duro began his senior club career at Elbasani, where he played from 1996 to 1998, making 54 league appearances and scoring 2 goals. In 1998, he moved to Romanian side Steaua București, playing in Liga I until 2001 and winning the Liga I title in the 2000–01 season and the Cupa României in 1998–99.

Duro returned to Albania in 2001 to play for Dinamo Tirana for one season, winning the Albanian Superliga in 2001–02. From 2002 to 2004, he was back in Romania with Național București, appearing in 23 league matches. He then played for Tirana from 2004 to 2007, winning two Albanian Superliga titles (2004–05, 2006–07), one Albanian Cup (2005–06), and three Supercups (2004, 2005, 2006). In 2006–07 he also had a brief spell with Teuta. Duro concluded his career with Besa Kavajë from 2007 to 2010.

== International career ==
He made his international debut for the Albania on 5 June 1999 in a European Championship qualification match against Norway in Tirana. Duro earned five caps between 1999 and 2000, appearing in three other occasions during the qualifying campaign against Slovenia, Greece, Georgia and playing his final international on 26 April 2000 in a friendly match against Macedonia.

== Personal life ==
According to several reports, former Albania international Klodian Duro has referred to Albert as his brother, noting that the two also played together during their time at Elbasani.

In October 2021, he was granted approval for the renunciation of Albanian citizenship in an official presidential decree. He has a daughter named Emilia.

== Career statistics ==
=== Club ===
Appearances and goals by club, season and competition
Club	Season	League			Cup		Continental		Supercup		Total	
Club	Season	Division	Apps	Goals	Apps	Goals	Apps	Goals	Apps	Goals	Apps	Goals
Elbasani	1996–97	Albanian National Championship	12	0	—		—		—		12	0
Elbasani	1997–98	Albanian National Championship	30	1	—		—		—		30	1
Elbasani	1998–99	Albanian National Championship	12	1	—		—		—		12	1
Elbasani	Total		54	2	0	0	0	0	0	0	54	2
Steaua București	1998–99	Divizia A	10	0	1	0	—		—		11	0
Steaua București	1999–2000	Divizia A	19	0	—		7	1	—		26	1
Steaua București	2000–01	Divizia A	3	0	—		—		—		3	0
Steaua București	Total		32	0	1	0	7	1	0	0	40	1
Dinamo Tirana	2001–02	Albanian National Championship	6	1	1	0	—		—		7	1
Național București	2002–03	Divizia A	16	0	—		4	0	—		20	0
Național București	2003–04	Divizia A	7	0	—		—		—		7	0
Național București	Total		23	0	0	0	4	0	0	0	27	0
Tirana	2004–05	Kategoria Superiore	9	0	—		0	0	1	0	10	0
Tirana	2005–06	Kategoria Superiore	18	0	—		0	0	1	0	19	0
Tirana	2006–07	Kategoria Superiore	5	1	—		0	0	1	0	6	1
Tirana	Total		32	1	0	0	0	0	3	0	35	1
Teuta Durrës	2006–07	Kategoria Superiore	5	0	—		0	0	—		5	0
Besa Kavajë	2007–08	Kategoria Superiore	4	0	—		1	0	—		5	0
Besa Kavajë	2008–09	Kategoria Superiore	3	0	—		0	0	—		3	0
Besa Kavajë	Total		7	0	0	0	1	0	0	0	8	0
Career total			159	4	2	0	12	1	3	0	176	5

=== International ===
Appearances and goals by national team and year
National team	Year	Apps	Goals
Albania	1999	4	0
Albania	2000	1	0
Total		5	0

== Honours ==
Honours achieved by Duro.

=== Club ===
Steaua București

- Divizia A: 2000–01
- Cupa României: 1998–99

Dinamo Tirana

- Albanian National Championship: 2001–02

Tirana

- Albanian National Championship: 2004–05, 2006–07
- Albanian Cup: 2005–06
- Albanian Supercup: 2004, 2005, 2006
