= Ardian Mema =

Albanian footballer and coach

Personal information
- Full name: Ardian Mema
- Date of birth: 16 February 1970 (age 56)
- Place of birth: Tirana, Albania
- Position: Midfielder

Youth career
- 1980–1989: Tirana

Senior career*
Years	Team	Apps	(Gls)
1989–1997	Tirana	101+	(7+)
1997–1998	Partizani	26	(2)
1998–2002	Tirana	89	(13)

International career
1995–1998	Albania	8	(0)

Managerial career
- 2007: Tirana (assistant)
- 2009–2011: Albania U17
- 2013: Tirana B
- 2015: Hajer Club U-19
- 2017–2018: Skënderbeu (assistant)
- 2018: Flamurtari (assistant)
- 2018–2019: Tirana
- 2022–2023: Kastrioti
- 2023–2024: Vëllaznimi
- 2024–2025: Pogradeci
- * Club domestic league appearances and goals

Ardian Mema (born 16 November 1971 in Tirana) is a former Albanian football player and coach. He played for KF Tirana 1989 and 2003 and has managed both the senior team and the reserves in 2007 and 2013 respectively.

== Playing career ==
=== Club ===
Ardian was born into the prominent Mema footballing family, as his dad was former KF Tirana and Albania international Ali Mema, and his uncles Haxhi and Osman were both professional footballers, too. His cousin Sulejman was also a footballer and former KF Tirana player, as was Klevi Mema who died at the age of 19. He joined the senior team of KF Tirana in 1989, and in the same year he began his further education at the Academy of Physical and Sports Education Vojo Kushi, where he graduated in 1993. He retired in 2003 from a 14-year career with KF Tirana where he won 6 league titles, 5 Albanian Cups and 4 Albanian Supercups, as well as being in the team of the year in 5 consecutive seasons at the height of his career in the '90s.

=== International ===
He made his debut for Albania in an April 1995 European Championship qualification match against Georgia and earned a total of 8 caps, scoring no goals. His final international was a February 1998 friendly match against Latvia.

== Managerial career ==
Following his retirement Mema went into management and became the assistant coach of KF Tirana in 2007, where he was also an interim manager for one game in 2007 before the arrival of Astrit Hafizi. He then managed the Ali Dema futsal team before going on to manage the Albania national under 17 team for two and a half years in 2009. He was also instrumental in setting up the KF Tirana B team in 2013, where he was also their first manager before stepping down to become the director of the KF Tirana academy, a post which he still holds.

=== Managerial statistics ===
Team	From	To	Record				
Team	From	To	G	W	D	L	Win %
Tirana	12 October 2018	24 October 2019	46	18	13	15	39.13
Tirana	12 October 2018	24 October 2019	440	357	50	33	81.14

== Honours ==
=== Player ===
Tirana

- Albanian Superliga: 1988–89, 1994–95, 1995–96, 1998–99, 1999–00, 2002–03
- Albanian Cup: 1993–94, 1995–96, 1998–99, 2000–01, 2001–02
- Albanian Supercup: 1994, 2000, 2002, 2003

=== Manager ===
KF Tirana

Runners-up (1) Albanian Cup 2018–19
