= Florian Riza =

Albanian footballer and pundit

Personal information
- Date of birth: 13 July 1969 (age 57)
- Place of birth: Tirana, Albania
- Position: Centre-forward

Senior career*
Years	Team	Apps	(Gls)
1987–1991	Tirana		
1991–1992	Demirspor	26	(3)
1992–2001	Tirana		
- * Club domestic league appearances and goals

Florian Riza (born 13 July 1969) is an Albanian pundit and former professional footballer who played as a centre-forward for Albanian club Tirana as well as spending one season in Turkey in Demirspor.

== Honours ==
Tirana

- Kategoria Superiore: 1987–88, 1988–89, 1995–96, 1996–97, 1999–2000
- Kupa e Shqipërisë: 1993–94, 1995–96, 1998–99, 2000–01
- Superkupa e Shqipërisë: 1994, 2000
