= Alban Tafaj =

Albanian footballer and manager

Personal information
- Full name: Alban Tafaj
- Date of birth: 3 December 1971 (age 54)
- Place of birth: Tirana, Albania
- Position: Defender

Youth career
- –1992: Partizani Tirana

Senior career*
Years	Team	Apps	(Gls)
1992–1997	Partizani Tirana	96	(3)
1997–2006	Tirana	182	(14)
Total		278	(17)

Managerial career
- 2009: Tirana (caretaker)
- 2009–2010: Tirana (caretaker)
- 2012: Tirana (caretaker)
- 2012–2013: Tirana (caretaker)
- * Club domestic league appearances and goals

Alban Tafaj (born 3 December 1971) is an Albanian former professional football manager and retired player. He played for both Albanian city rivals Partizani Tirana and Tirana.

== Playing career ==
Born in Tirana, Albania, Tafaj played for hometown clubs Partizani Tirana and Tirana. He played at Partizani for five years, and at Tirana for nine. He won the Albanian Superliga six times as a player, one of them being with Partizani and the others with Tirana. Tafaj also won the cup and Supercup trophies with the two clubs. He retired in 2006 at the age of 35.

== Managerial career ==
Following his retirement from professional football, Tafaj was offered a job in the back room staff at Tirana. He became the club's technical director but has also had to fill in as a caretaker manager when the club changed managers through the season. He guided Tirana to their 24th Albanian Superliga in 2009 after former manager Agustin Kola left the club after narrowly losing out on the Albanian Cup trophy to Flamurtari in March of that year. Tafaj finished the season and kept Tirana at the top of the table to win the championship. Once again he became the caretaker manager after Croatian manager Ilija Lončarević left the club in October 2009 after a series of poor results. He stayed on that position until January 2009.

In October 2012, then still technical director of the club, Tafaj replaced Artur Lekbello as caretaker of Tirana for the fourth time, staying there until February 2013. He had already been caretaker earlier that year after Julián Rubio left the club for Flamurtari in September 2012.

== Honours ==
=== Player ===
Partizani Tirana

- Albanian Superliga: 1992–93
- Albanian Cup: 1992–93, 1996–97

Tirana

- Albanian Superliga: 1998–99, 1999–2000, 2002–03, 2003-04, 2004–05, 2005–06
- Albanian Cup: 1998–99, 2000–01, 2001–02
- Albanian Supercup: 2000, 2002, 2003, 2005

=== Manager ===
Tirana

- Albanian Superliga: 2008–09
