= Ndubuisi Egbo =

Nigerian association football player

Personal information
- Full name: Ndubuisi Emmanuel Egbo
- Date of birth: 25 July 1973 (age 53)
- Place of birth: Aba, Nigeria
- Height: 1.82 m (6 ft 0 in)
- Position: Goalkeeper

Senior career*
| Years | Team | Apps | (Gls) |
| 1993 | NITEL Vasco Enugu | | (1) |
| 1994–1995 | NEPA Lagos | | |
| 1996–1998 | Julius Berger | | |
| 1998–2001 | El-Masry | | |
| 2001 | Moroka Swallows | | |
| 2001–2004 | Tirana | 157 | (0) |
| 2004–2007 | El-Masry | | |
| 2007–2011 | Bylis | 52 | (1) |

International career
| 1999–2002 | Nigeria | 12 | (1) |

Managerial career
- 2010–2013: Bylis (goalkeeping coach)
- 2013–2014: Bylis
- 2014–2019: Tirana (goalkeeping coach)
- 2019–2020: Tirana
- 2022: Ohod
- 2023: Albanët (assistant)
- 2023–2024: Prishtina
- 2024: Bylis
Medal record
Nigeria
| Third place | African Cup of Nations | 2002 |
- * Club domestic league appearances and goals

Ndubuisi Emmanuel Egbo (born 25 July 1973) is a Nigerian professional football manager and former player.

Egbo played as a goalkeeper during his professional career, most notably representing Tirana, winning with them three trophies. He was also a player of Nigeria national team, playing 12 matches and representing it in two tournaments of African Cup of Nations.

== Club career ==
Egbo previously played for NITEL Vasco Enugu, NEPA Lagos and Julius Berger in the Nigeria Premier League, for Moroka Swallows in the South African Premier Soccer League, for El-Masry in the Egyptian Premier League, and for Tirana and Bylis Ballsh in the Kategoria Superiore.

== International career ==
Egbo has made several appearances for the full Nigeria national team. He was a member of the Nigeria squad at the 2000 and 2002 African Cup of Nations.

== Managerial career ==
On 17 October 2015, after the sacking of Shkëlqim Muça following 1–1 home draw against Flamurtari Vlorë, both assistants of Muça were appointed temporarily the new managers of KF Tirana. Egbo became the first ever Nigerian coach to lead a European team to a league title after his team were crowned 2019/2020 Albanian League champions, the team also qualified for the Uefa Champions League.

=== Managerial statistics ===
Last updated 28 September 2025

| Team | From | To | Record | | | | |
| Team | From | To | G | W | D | L | Win % |
|---|---|---|---|---|---|---|---|
| Bylis | Aug 01, 2013 | May 30, 2014 | 30 | 8 | 10 | 12 | 26.67 |
| Tirana | Dec 09, 2019 | Nov 12, 2020 | 36 | 23 | 4 | 9 | 63.89 |
| Prishtina | Oct 26, 2023 | Jun 2, 2024 | 33 | 14 | 10 | 9 | 42.42 |
| Bylis | Jul 04, 2024 | Sep 25, 2024 | 6 | 1 | 2 | 3 | 16.67 |

== Honours ==
=== Club ===
Julius Berger

- Nigeria Premier League: 1996

Al-Masry

- Egypt Cup: 1997–98

KF Tirana

- Albanian Cup: 2001–02
- Albanian Supercup: 2002, 2003
- Kategoria Superiore: 2002–03, 2003–04

KF Bylis

- Kategoria e Parë: 2009–10

=== Manager ===
KF Tirana

- Kategoria Superiore: 2019-20

FC Prishtina

- Kosovar Supercup: 2024
