= Igli Allmuça =

Albanian footballer and coach

Personal information
- Date of birth: 25 October 1980 (age 46)
- Place of birth: Tirana, PSR Albania
- Height: 1.76 m (5 ft 9 in)
- Position: Midfielder

Youth career
- 1995–1999: Partizani

Senior career*
Years	Team	Apps	(Gls)
1999–2006	Partizani Tirana	143	(69)
2006–2007	Tirana	69	(45)
2007–2011	Dinamo Tirana	116	(12)
2011–2012	Skënderbeu Korçë	22	(3)
2012–2015	Kukësi	54	(12)
2015–2016	Dinamo Tirana	14	(4)

International career
2003–2004	Albania U21	7	(0)
2011–2012	Albania	1	(0)

Managerial career
- 2015–2019: Dinamo Tirana
- * Club domestic league appearances and goals

Igli Allmuça (born 25 October 1980) is an Albanian professional football coach and former player.

Allmuça played as a midfielder and spent the majority of his career with Partizani Tirana and Dinamo Tirana, being successful in both clubs. He also had e brief spell with Tirana, becoming one of the few players to represent all capital teams and to win at least a trophy with them.

Allmuça is one of the most decorated players in the history of Albanian football, winning with Partizani Tirana, Tirana, Dinamo Tirana and Skënderbeu Korçë. Allmuça is the 10th Albanian player with most appearances in European competitions with 32 matches between UEFA Champions League, UEFA Europa League and UEFA Intertoto Cup.

== Club career ==
=== Tirana ===
On 29 June 2006, Allmuça joined Tirana on a one-year transfer, taking the vacant number 17. Following his presentation, Allmuça flew out to Macedonia to link up with the rest of the squad on their summer training camp. He was an important instrument in team's European campaign, playing 4 out of 4 matches, as Tirana were eliminated in the second round by Kayserispor. He made his competitive debut on 13 July in 2006–07 UEFA Cup first round's first leg against Varaždin, where he played 79th minutes in an eventual 1–1 away draw. He had an important role in the returning leg as Tirana recorded a 2–0 win at Selman Stërmasi Stadium, progressing in the next round with the aggregate 3–1.

=== Dinamo Tirana ===
In August 2007, Allmuça signed with Dinamo Tirana for the upcoming 2007–08 season. On 27 June 2008, following the end of the season where Dinamo was crowned as Albanian champions, Allmuça agreed a contract extension for another season.

=== Skënderbeu Korçë ===
On 10 June 2011, Allmuça agreed personal terms with Albanian champions Skënderbeu Korçë and signed a one-year contract with them, and was assigned number 14 for the 2011–12 season. He made his competitive debut with the club on 13 July 2011 in team's first ever European match against APOEL, playing 67 minutes in e eventual 2–0 home defeat. In the returning leg of Champions League's second round seven days later, Allmuça played full-90 minutes, being unable to avoid the 4–0 away lose, with Skënderbeu Korçë who were eliminated with the aggregate 6–0.

=== Kukësi ===
On 2 August 2012, Allmuça joined Kukësi on a free transfer, signing a one-year deal with a wage of 45.000 Albanian Lek. He was allocated squad number 14, and made his Kukësi debut in team's first ever Albanian Superliga match, a goalless draw against Luftëtari Gjirokastër in which Allmuça played full-90 minutes. Allmuça concluded his first season with Kukësi by playing 34 matches between league and cup, scoring 14 times in the process. Following the end of the season, he was named "Albanian Superliga Fair Play Award".

Allmuça was released from Kukësi on 5 January 2015 after making only four league appearances in the first part of the season. He said that he didn't expect his departure from Kukësi, adding that he club's directors didn't gave him a reason for his releasing.

=== Return to Dinamo Tirana ===
On 8 January 2015, Allmuça, aged 34, returned to Dinamo Tirana who were in Albanian First Division to play for the second part of 2014–15 season. He was immediately named the new captain of the team, and made his return debut on 7 February by playing 62 minutes in a 1–0 away loss to Lushnja. He scored his first goal of the season in his second appearance for Dinamo Tirana, the lone goal of the match against Tomori Berat from a penalty kick.

Allmuça was able to cement a place at the starting lineup by playing 14 matches, all of them as a starter scoring four times in the process, scoring one goal in each month, as Dinamo Tirana failed to promote in Albanian Superliga. In the last match of 2014–15 season against Tomori Berat on 16 May 2015, Allmuça converted a penalty kick to help Dinamo to finish the season with a win. Following the end of 2014–15 season, Allmuça decided to retire from football at the age of 34, thus terminating his 16-year career, starting his coaching career in the process.

== International career ==
=== Youth teams ===
In 2002, Allmuça, aged 21, was called up for the first time to play for Albania U21 in their qualifying campaign for 2004 UEFA Euro U21 by then coach Hasan Lika. He made his competitive debut on 11 October 2002 in team's first qualifying match against Switzerland, playing full-90 minutes in defence with the number 2 in an eventual goalless draw at Selman Stërmasi Stadium. Five days later, he made his appearance with Albania who fell down 1–0 against Russia. He would play another five matches in teams not successfully qualifying campaign; during the qualifiers, Allmuça was moved in midfield by the coach Lika and he swapped the number from 2 to 14. Albania eventually concluded the Group 10 in third place with 10 points from three wins, one draw and four losses.

=== Senior team ===
Allmuça received a call-up from the Albania senior team coach Josip Kuže for the friendly match against Argentina on 20 June 2011. In this match, Allmuça played as a starter before being substituted in 58th-minute for fellow midfielder Gilman Lika, with the match finished in a 4–0 away lose. That was his first and last international appearance for Albania senior team.

== Managerial career ==
=== Dinamo Tirana ===
On 30 June 2015, Allmuça was named the new coach of Dinamo Tirana for the upcoming 2015–16 season, taking the duty over Faruk Sejdini. He started his work for the new season on 13 July. In Allmuça's first match as a manager in Albanian First Division, Dinamo lost to Luftëtari Gjirokastër 2–0 at the Internacional Complex. Following another league defeat at the hands of Pogradeci, Allmuça won his first match in charge against Shkumbini Peqin on 26 September 2015, thanks to goal of Jozef Thana and the own goal of Emilan Lundraxhiu.

== Career statistics ==
=== Club ===
As of 28 February 2016

Club	Season	League			Cup		Continental (Note: Including continental competitions, such as UEFA Champions League, UEFA Europa League and UEFA Intertoto Cup)		Other (Note: Including other competitions, such as Albanian Supercup)		Total	
Club	Season	Division	Apps	Goals	Apps	Goals	Apps	Goals	Apps	Goals	Apps	Goals
Partizani Tirana	1999–2000	Albanian Superliga	2	0	—		—		—		2	0
Partizani Tirana	2000–01	Albanian First Division	0	0	—		—		—		0	0
Partizani Tirana	2001–02	Albanian Superliga	9	1	—		—		—		9	1
Partizani Tirana	2002–03	Albanian Superliga	13	1	—		—		1	1	14	2
Partizani Tirana	2003–04	Albanian Superliga	23	1	—		4	0	—		27	1
Partizani Tirana	2004–05	Albanian Superliga	33	4	1	1	3	0	—		37	5
Partizani Tirana	2005–06	Albanian Superliga	33	1	—		—		—		33	1
Partizani Tirana	2006–07	Albanian Superliga	—		—		2	0	—		2	0
Partizani Tirana	Total		113	8	1	1	9	0	1	1	124	10
Tirana	2006–07	Albanian Superliga	30	0	—		4	0	1	0	35	0
Tirana	Total		30	0	—		4	0	1	0	35	0
Dinamo Tirana	2007–08	Albanian Superliga	28	4	4	1	—		—		32	5
Dinamo Tirana	2008–09	Albanian Superliga	28	2	1	0	2	0	1	0	32	2
Dinamo Tirana	2009–10	Albanian Superliga	30	0	3	0	2	0	—		35	0
Dinamo Tirana	2010–11	Albanian Superliga	30	6	5	0	1	0	—		36	6
Dinamo Tirana	Total		116	12	13	1	5	0	1	0	135	13
Skënderbeu Korçë	2011–12	Albanian Superliga	22	3	11	0	2	0	1	0	36	3
Skënderbeu Korçë	2012–13	Albanian Superliga	—		—		2	0	—		2	0
Skënderbeu Korçë	Total		22	3	11	0	4	0	1	0	38	3
Kukësi	2012–13	Albanian Superliga	25	9	9	5	—		—		34	14
Kukësi	2013–14	Albanian Superliga	25	3	5	0	8	1	—		38	4
Kukësi	2014–15	Albanian Superliga	4	0	5	2	2	0	—		11	2
Kukësi	Total		54	12	19	7	10	1	—		83	20
Dinamo Tirana	2014–15	Albanian First Division	14	4	—		—		—		14	4
Dinamo Tirana	Total		14	4	—		—		—		14	4
Career total			369	39	44	9	32	1	4	1	429	40

=== International ===
As of 28 February 2016

Albania national team
Year	Apps	Goals
2011	1	0
Total	1	0

=== Managerial ===
As of 29 February 2016

Team	From	To	Record					
Team	From	To	G	W	D	L	Win %	Ref.
Dinamo Tirana	30 June 2015	Present	18	6	2	10	33.33	
Total			18	6	2	10	33.33	

== Honours ==
=== Club ===
Partizani Tirana

- Albanian Cup (1): 2003–04
- Albanian Supercup (1): 2004

Tirana

- Albanian Superliga (1): 2006–07
- Albanian Supercup (1): 2006

Dinamo Tirana

- Albanian Superliga (1): 2009–10
- Albanian Supercup (1): 2008, Runner-up 2010

Skënderbeu Korçë

- Albanian Superliga (1): 2011–12
- Albanian Supercup: Runner-up 2011

Kukësi

- Albanian Superliga: Runner-up 2012–13, 2013–14
- Albanian Cup: Runner-up 2013–14

=== Individual ===
- Albanian Superliga Fair Play Award (1): 2012–13
