= 2004–05 Albanian Cup =

Kupa e Shqipërisë

Tournament details
- Country: Albania

Final positions
- Champions: Teuta
- Runners-up: Tirana

2004–05 Albanian Cup (Albanian: Kupa e Shqipërisë) was the fifty-third season of Albania's annual cup competition. It began on 28 August 2004 with the preliminary round and ended on 11 May 2005 with the final match. The winners of the competition qualified for the 2005-06 first qualifying round of the UEFA Europa League. Partizani were the defending champions, having won their fifteenth Albanian Cup last season. The cup was won by Teuta.

The rounds were played in a two-legged format similar to those of European competitions. If the aggregated score was tied after both games, the team with the higher number of away goals advanced. If the number of away goals was equal in both games, the match was decided by extra time and a penalty shootout, if necessary.

== Preliminary round ==
Games were played on 28 August – 1 September 2004.

Team 1	Agg.	Team 2	1st leg	2nd leg
Albania FK	0–4 (w/o)	Besa	0–2 (w/o)	0–2 (w/o)
Çakrani	2–4	Flamurtari	1–0	1–4
Poliçani	3–12	Tomori	2–7	1–5
Përmeti	2–5	Bylis	2–1	0–4
Skrapari	0–4	Naftëtari	0–2	0–2 (w/o)
Korabi	1–9	Besëlidhja	1–1	0–8
Suçi	1–8	Erzeni	1–6	0–2 (w/o)
Këlcyra	2–12	Luftëtari	1–5	1–7
Bulqiza	0–4	Kastrioti	0–2	0–2
Fushë Mbreti	3–16	Pogradeci	2–7	1–9
Pojani	0–8	Skënderbeu	0–4	0–4
Minatori Memaliaj	1–9	Apolonia	0–3	1–6
Tërbuni	6–4	Veleçiku	3–4	3–0
Gramshi	2–4	Çlirimi	2–1	0–3
Domozdova	0–5	Gramozi	0–0	0–5
Turbina	3–2	Dajti	1–1	2–1
Maliqi	3–4	Devolli	2–1	1–3
Burreli	2–5	Ada	2–3	0–2
Tepelena	2–2 (a)	Albpetrol	2–1	0–1
Minatori Rrëshen	4–0 (w/o)	Përparimi	2–0 (w/o)	2–0 (w/o)
Butrinti	3–4	Delvina	2–1	1–3
Iliria	4–5	Sopoti	3–2	1–3

== First round ==
All fourteen teams of the 2003–04 Superliga and First Division entered in this round, along with Preliminary Round winners. Games were played on 22–29 September 2004.

Team 1	Agg.	Team 2	1st leg	2nd leg
Tërbuni	0–11	Vllaznia	0–3	0–8
Sopoti	2–9	Tirana	2–2	0–7
Turbina	1–2	Partizani	0–1	1–1
Ada	3–2	Dinamo Tirana	2–1	1–1
Albpetrol	1–9	Teuta	0–3	1–6
Çlirimi	2–6	Lushnja	2–3	0–3
Devolli	3–9	Shkumbini	1–1	2–8
Gramozi	1–5	Elbasani	1–0	0–5
Minatori Rrëshen	1–3	Laçi	1–1	0–2 (w/o)
Apolonia	1–0	Egnatia	1–0	0–0
Pogradeci	2–2 (a)	Besa	0–1	2–1
Delvina	1–5	Flamurtari	1–2	0–3
Skënderbeu	5–8	Tomori	2–1	3–7
Luftëtari	2–1	Bylis	2–0	0–1
Erzeni	0–5	Naftëtari	0–4	0–1
Kastrioti	4–4 (a)	Besëlidhja	3–0	1–4

== Second round ==
First legs were played on 20 October 2004 and the second legs were played on 27 October 2004.

Team 1	Agg.	Team 2	1st leg	2nd leg
Apolonia	2–7	Vllaznia	1–3	1–4
Tomori	4–9	Shkumbini	1–3	3–6
Pogradeci	1–5	Tirana	0–0	1–5
Ada	2–5	Flamurtari	1–3	1–2
Naftëtari	2–5	Teuta	1–3	1–2
Luftëtari	2–3	Lushnja	2–2	0–1
Laçi	1–10	Elbasani	0–6	1–4
Kastrioti	0–7	Partizani	0–1	0–6

== Quarter-finals ==
In this round entered the 8 winners from the previous round.

Team 1	Agg.	Team 2	1st leg	2nd leg
Flamurtari	1–3	Partizani	1–2	0–1
Elbasani	3–4	Teuta	3–3	0–1
Shkumbini	2–3	Vllaznia	0–1	2–2
Lushnja	1–3	Tirana	1–0	0–3

== Semi-finals ==
In this round entered the four winners from the previous round.

Team 1	Agg.	Team 2	1st leg	2nd leg
Teuta	2–2 (a)	Partizani	1–0	1–2
Tirana	4–1	Vllaznia	1–0	3–1

6 April 2005	Teuta	1–0	Partizani	Niko Dovana Stadium, Durrës
	Xhafa 44'	Report

20 April 2005	Partizani	2–1	Teuta	Qemal Stafa Stadium, Tirana
	Hallaçi 45'; Halili 88'	Report	Mançaku 18'

Teuta advanced to the final.

6 April 2005	Tirana	1–0	Vllaznia	Selman Stërmasi Stadium, Tirana
	Xhafa 41'	Report

20 April 2005	Vllaznia	1–3	Tirana	Loro Boriçi Stadium, Shkodër
	Abílio 39' (pen.)	Report	Rraklli 50'; Patushi 67'; Sene 73'

Tirana advanced to the final.

== Final ==
11 May 2005
17:00

Teuta	0–0	Tirana
Penalties
Mançaku (penalty scored); Tetova (penalty scored); D. Xhafa (penalty missed); Kapllani (penalty scored); Gjondeda (penalty scored); Hasho (penalty scored); Hasani (penalty scored)	6–5	(penalty scored) Bulku; (penalty scored) Patushi; (penalty scored) Sina; (penalty scored) Tafaj; (penalty missed) F. Xhafa; (penalty scored) Merkoçi; (penalty missed) Hajdari

Ruzhdi Bizhuta Stadium, Elbasan
Attendance: 10,500
Referee: Albano Janku
