= 1998 Albanian Supercup =

- Event: Albanian Supercup
KS Vllaznia	KS Apolonia
1	1
- Vllaznia won 5–4 on penalties
- Date: January 9, 1999
- Venue: Qemal Stafa Stadium, Tirana
- Referee: Myrteza Allkja
- Attendance: 1,000

The 1998 Albanian Supercup was the sixth edition of the Albanian Supercup since its establishment in 1989. The match was contested between the Albanian Cup 1998 winners KS Apolonia and the 1997–98 Albanian Superliga champions KS Vllaznia.

KS Vllaznia won 5–4 by penalties, as regular and extra time result ended 1–1.

== Match details ==
9 January 1999
14:00 CET

KS Vllaznia	1–1 (a.e.t.)	KS Apolonia
Miloti 51'		Poçi 45'
Penalties
Miloti (penalty scored); Xhahysa (penalty scored); Liçi (penalty scored); Jahja (penalty scored); Zmijani (penalty scored)	5–4	(penalty scored) Bare; (penalty scored) Bita; (penalty scored) Jahiqi; (penalty scored) Nuredini; (penalty missed) Sula

Qemal Stafa Stadium, Tirana
Attendance: 1,000
Referee: Myrteza Allkja

== See also ==
- 1997–98 Albanian Superliga
- 1997–98 Albanian Cup
