= Indrit Fortuzi =

Albanian footballer

Indrit Fortuzi (Zogu)
Personal information
- Full name: Indrit Shaban Fortuzi
- Date of birth: 23 November 1973 (age 52)
- Place of birth: Tirana, PR Albania
- Height: 1.78 m (5 ft 10 in)
- Position: Forward

Senior career*
Years	Team	Apps	(Gls)
1990–1993	Dinamo Tirana	56	(15)
1993–1998	Tirana	84	(54)
1997–2000	Apollon Athens	56	(2)
2000–2005	Tirana	99	(91)
2005–2007	Iraklis	26	(6)
2007–2008	Tirana	27	(7)
Total		352	(176)

International career
1992–2002	Albania	25	(1)

Managerial career
- 2009: Skënderbeu
- * Club domestic league appearances and goals

Indrit Shaban Fortuzi (born 23 November 1973) is an Albanian retired national football forward who has played almost all his career for Tirana.

== Club career ==
Nicknamed Zogu (bird), he has also played for Dinamo Tirana and in Greece for Iraklis and Apollon Athens. He is the best scorer of all time for Tirana and the third scorer of all time for Albanian Superliga with 167 goals.

== International career ==
One of the biggest talents to emerge from Albanian football in the 1990s, Fortuzi made his debut for Albania in June 1992 FIFA World Cup qualification match against Lithuania in Tirana and earned a total of 25 caps, scoring 1 goal. His final international was an April 2002 friendly loss at Andorra.

== Personal life ==
He is married and has children, named Ketlin(Catlyn) and Rajan(Ryan). Fortuzi went in politics and was mayor of one of Tirana's municipalities in 2011.

== Honours ==
=== KF Tirana ===
- Albanian Superliga:(5) 1994–95, 1995–96, 1996–97, 2002–03, 2003–04
- Albanian Supercup:(4) 1994, 2000, 2002, 2003
- Albanian Cup:(4) 1993–94, 1995–96, 2000–01, 2001–02

== Statistics ==
=== Clubs ===
Season	Team	Matches	Goals
1991–92	Dinamo Tirana	30	9
1992–93	Dinamo Tirana	26	6
1993–94	KF Tirana	24	10
1994–95	KF Tirana	27	18
1995–96	KF Tirana	6	3
1996–97	KF Tirana	15	8
1997–98	KF Tirana	12	15
1998–00	Apollon Athens	56	2
2000–01	KF Tirana	25	30
2001–02	KF Tirana	24	24
2002–03	KF Tirana	9	5
2003–04	KF Tirana	31	20
2004–05	KF Tirana	14	12
2005–07	Iraklis	26	7
2007–08	KF Tirana	27	7
TOTAL		352	176

=== International ===
Albania national football team
Years	Apps	Goals
1992	2	0
1993	7	0
1994	3	0
1995	2	0
1996	2	0
1997	1	0
1998–1999	–	–
2000	1	0
2001	2	0
2002	5	1
Total	25	1
