= 2001 Albanian Supercup =

- Event: Albanian Supercup
KF Vllaznia	KF Tirana
2	1
- Date: September 15, 2001
- Venue: Qemal Stafa Stadium, Tirana
- Referee: Myrteza Allkja
- Attendance: 2,300

The 2001 Albanian Supercup is the eighth edition of the Albanian Supercup since its establishment in 1989. The match was contested between the Albanian Cup 2001 winners KF Tirana and the 2000–01 Albanian Superliga champions KF Vllaznia.

== Match details ==
15 September 2001
17:00 CET

KF Vllaznia	2–1	KF Tirana
Patushi 13'; Sinani 88'		Sina 59'

Qemal Stafa Stadium, Tirana
Attendance: 2,300
Referee: Myrteza Allkja

== See also ==
- 2000–01 Albanian Superliga
- 2000–01 Albanian Cup
