= Karamba Gassama =

Gambian footballer (born 2005)

Personal information
- Date of birth: 2 January 2005 (age 21)
- Place of birth: Banjul, The Gambia
- Height: 1.85 m (6 ft 1 in)
- Position: Midfielder

Team information
- Current team: Gaziantep
- Number: 17

Youth career
- Jambur United: Fortune FC

Senior career*
Years	Team	Apps	(Gls)
2021–2023	Fortune FC		
2023–2026	Dinamo City	53	(1)
2026–	Gaziantep	15	(0)

International career^{‡}
2026–	The Gambia	1	(0)
- * Club domestic league appearances and goals as of 10 June 2026 ‡ National team caps and goals as of 14:56, 1 June 2026 (UTC)

Karamba Gassama (born 2 January 2005) is a Gambian professional footballer who plays as a midfielder for Süper Lig club Gaziantep and The Gambia national team.

== Club career ==
A product of the Gambian club Fortune FC, Gassama moved to Ohe moved to the Albanian club Dinamo City in January 2023. He helped Dinamo win the 2024–25 Albanian Cup and 2025 Albanian Supercup. On 12 January 2026, he transferred to Süper Lig club Gaziantep on a 3-year contract.

He started his club football at his hometown's football club, Jambur United, which is based in Jambur, Kombo South and competes in West Coast Region Zonal Football Tournament and Brikama nawetan competitions.

== International career ==
Gassama was called up to the national team of The Gambia for a friendly against Iran on 29 May 2026.

== Honours ==
Dinamo City

- Albanian Cup: 2024–25
- Albanian Supercup: 2025
