= 1992 Albanian Supercup =

- Event: Albanian Supercup
KS Elbasani	KS Vllaznia
3	2
- Date: 10 January 1993
- Venue: Selman Stërmasi Stadium, Tirana
- Referee: Bujar Pregja
- Attendance: 1,000

The 1992 Albanian Supercup was the fourth edition of the Albanian Supercup since its establishment in 1989. The match was contested between the Albanian Cup 1992 winners KS Elbasani and the 1991–92 Albanian Superliga champions KS Vllaznia.

KS Elbasani won 3-2 in extra time.

== Match details ==
10 January 1993
13:30 CET

KS Elbasani	3–2 (a.e.t.)	KS Vllaznia
Bilali 55', 103'; Jakupi 115'		Kottri 48'; Dedja 110'

Selman Stërmasi Stadium, Tirana
Attendance: 1,000
Referee: Bujar Pregja

== See also ==
- 1991–92 Albanian Superliga
- 1991–92 Albanian Cup
