= Qose =

Qose is a surname. Notable people with the surname include:

- Kristi Qose (born 1995), Albanian footballer
- Rigels Qose (born 1977), Albanian footballer
