= Auron Miloti =

Albanian footballer (born 1974)

Personal information
- Date of birth: 4 August 1974 (age 52)
- Place of birth: Shkodër, PR Albania
- Height: 1.73 m (5 ft 8 in)
- Position: Forward

Senior career*
Years	Team	Apps	(Gls)
1992–1994	Vllaznia	39	(7)
1994–1998	Tirana	96	(20)
1998–1999	Vllaznia	26	(8)
2000	Veritas Wittenberge		
2000–2003	SV Wörgl	98	(34)
2004	LASK	23	(5)
2005–2012	SV Feldkirchen	119+	(84+)
2012	SC Globasnitz	14	(16)
2013–2015	GSC Liebenfels	67	(15)
2016-2019	SGA Sirnitz/Fischerhof		

International career
1995	Albania	2	(0)

Managerial career
- 2017: SV Feldkirchen
- * Club domestic league appearances and goals

Auron Selaudin Miloti (born 4 August 1974) is an Albanian retired football manager and former player who is assistant manager of Vllaznia in the Kategoria Superiore.

== Playing career ==
=== Club ===
The striker spent most of his career playing in Austria with SV Wörgl, where he played alongside compatriot Eldorado Merkoçi, LASK, SV Feldkirchen and SC Globasnitz. He also played in Albania until 2000 with KS Vllaznia Shkodër and KF Tirana.

=== International ===
Miloti made his debut for Albania in an August 1995 friendly match against Malta coming on as a substitute for Sokol Prenga and earned a total of two caps, scoring no goals. His other international was a November 1995 friendly against Bosnia.

== Managerial career ==
After retiring as a player, Miloti became youth coach at Feldkirchen and later took charge of their senior team.

== Honours ==
- Albanian Superliga: 1995, 1996, 1997
