= Vioresin Sinani =

Albanian footballer (born 1977)

Personal information
- Date of birth: 4 November 1977 (age 49)
- Place of birth: Shkodër, Albania
- Height: 1.79 m (5 ft 10 in)
- Position: Striker

Senior career*
Years	Team	Apps	(Gls)
1996–1997	Olimpik Tirana	4	(1)
1997–1999	Vllaznia Shkodër	60	(23)
1997–1999	NK Varteks	27	(5)
2000–2004	Vllaznia Shkodër	102	(80)
2004–2005	Kayserispor	4	(1)
2005–2006	Vllaznia Shkodër	56	(28)
2006–2007	Tirana	29	(23)
2007–2009	Vllaznia Shkodër	71	(36)
2010	Besa Kavajë	16	(5)
2010–2012	Vllaznia Shkodër	31	(11)
Total		400	(213)

International career
1997–1999	Albania U21	8	(10)
2000–2002	Albania	4	(1)

Managerial career
- 2011–2012: Vllaznia Shkodër (assistant)
- * Club domestic league appearances and goals

Vioresin Sinani (born 4 November 1977) is an Albanian former professional footballer who played as a striker. He spent the majority of his career at Vllaznia Shkodër as well as stints with Dinamo Tirana, Tirana and Besa Kavajë in Albania. He also played for NK Varteks in Croatia and Kayserispor in Turkey. He is Vllaznia's and the Albanian Superliga's record goalscorer.

Sinani was also an Albanian international, making eight appearances with under-21 squad and 4 with senior squad.

== Club career ==
=== Tirana ===
During the 2006–07 season, Sinani signed with the most successful club in Albania, KF Tirana, taking the number 9 in the process. He formed a very successful partnership in attack with the other striker from Shkodër, Hamdi Salihi, although he stayed only in the first part of the season. On 9 September 2006, in the team's second match of the season, Sinani scored his first three goals with Tirana shirt, recording a hat-trick in a 7–3 thrashing of Kastrioti Krujë at Selman Stërmasi Stadium. Later on 28 April of the following year, Sinani scored an early goal in the capital derby versus Dinamo Tirana, leading the team to a 2–1 win and closer to the championship; the win Tirana's 50th win over Dinamo.

On 9 May 2007, in the last league match against Vllaznia Shkodër, Tirana needed at least a draw to confirm as the champions of Albania for the 23rd time while their closest league rivals Teuta Durrës had to win to clinch the championship. Sinani scored twice inside of two minutes, however, respectively in 34th and 35 minutes, helping Tirana to win the 23rd league title with a 4–2 win, although Teuta won 1–0 at Peqin against Shkumbini. In personal terms, Sinani, with his 23 league goals, won the Albanian Superliga Golden Boot as the league top goalscorer, beating out his rival Daniel Xhafaj.

=== Besa Kavajë ===
In January 2010, Sinani left Vllaznia a joined Besa Kavajë for the second part of 2009–10 season. His transfer was officially completed on 12 January. He made his debut with the club on 27 January in team's 0–2 triumph away against Skënderbeu Korçë, and four days later scored his first goal in another 0–2 away win, this time against Apolonia Fier.

=== Vllaznia Shkodër ===
On 7 November 2010, Sinani scored his 200th and 201st Albanian Superliga goals during a 3–0 win over KF Elbasani, becoming the player in history to score more than 200 goals in Albanian top flight.

On 7 July 2011, Vllaznia won 1–0 against Birkirkara in the second leg of first qualifying round of Europa League to pass the round with the aggregate 2–1. Four days later, Sinani was fined by the club's directors for missing many opportunities to score in the last minutes of the match, thus complicating his team's qualification.

During the summer of 2011, Sinani signed a new one-year deal with the club until the end of the 2011–12 season.

In January 2012, he announced that he would be retiring from professional football at the end of the 2011–12 season, having turned 34 the previous month and being named Rudi Vata's assistant coach in November. He officially retired prior to the 2012–13 Albanian Superliga curtain-raiser between Vllaznia and the reigning champions Skënderbeu Korçë at the Loro Boriçi Stadium on 25 August 2012. A farewell ceremony was heldto celebrate his career, which was organised by Vllaznia and the Albanian Football Association. The president of the FA awarded Sinani with a 'plaque of appreciation' for his services to Albanian football and Vllaznia announced that the number 9 shirt would be temporarily retired for the 2012–13 season.

== International career ==
Sinani was part of the Albania's national football team that won the Rothmans Trophy in Malta which was held in early 2000. He scored his only international goal in the final match against the home team Malta which proved to be the trophy winning goal. Overall that year Sinani earned 4 in total but none of those where competitive FIFA or UEFA games.

Having not appeared in a squad since 2000, in May he was called in the squad for the friendly match against England B team. He was an unused substitute as England B won 3–1 at Turf Moor Stadium.

== Managerial career ==
Newly appointed Vllaznia Shkodër coach Rudi Vata made Sinani his assistant manager on 1 November 2011, while he was still an active player at the club.

== Career statistics ==
=== Club ===
As of 3 December 2015

Appearances and goals by club, season and competition
Club	Season	League		Cup		Continental (Note: Includes UEFA Champions League and UEFA Europa League.)		Other (Note: Includes Albanian Supercup.)		Total	
Club	Season	Apps	Goals	Apps	Goals	Apps	Goals	Apps	Goals	Apps	Goals
Olimpik Tiranë	1996–97	3	1	—		—		—		3	1
Vllaznia Shkodër	1996–97	0	0	0	0	—		—		0	0
Vllaznia Shkodër	1997–98	33	9	—		—		—		33	9
Vllaznia Shkodër	1998–99	27	14	—		2	0	—		29	14
Vllaznia Shkodër	Total	60	23	0	0	2	0	0	0	62	23
NK Varaždin	1999–2000	25	5	—		—		—		25	5
NK Varaždin	2000–01	2	0	—		—		—		2	0
NK Varaždin	Total	27	5	0	0	0	0	0	0	27	5
Vllaznia Shkodër	2000–01	26	15	—		—		—		26	15
Vllaznia Shkodër	2001–02	23	11	—		4	1	1	1	26	13
Vllaznia Shkodër	2002–03	18	18	—		—		—		18	18
Vllaznia Shkodër	2003–04	35	36	—		2	0	—		35	36
Vllaznia Shkodër	Total	102	80	0	0	4	1	1	1	105	82
Kayserispor	2004–05	4	1	—		—		—		4	1
Vllaznia Shkodër	2004–05	23	15	—		—		—		23	15
Vllaznia Shkodër	2005–06	33	13	—		—		—		33	13
Vllaznia Shkodër	Total	56	28	0	0	0	0	0	0	56	28
Tirana	2006–07	29	23	—		4	0	1	0	34	23
Vllaznia Shkodër	2007–08	30	20	—		2	0	—		32	20
Vllaznia Shkodër	2008–09	28	15	4	1	1	0	1	0	34	16
Vllaznia Shkodër	2009–10	13	1	—		2	0	—		15	1
Vllaznia Shkodër	Total	71	36	4	1	5	0	1	0	81	37
Besa Kavajë	2009–10	17	5	5	0	—		—		22	5
Vllaznia Shkodër	2010–11	28	11	4	1	—		—		32	12
Vllaznia Shkodër	2011–12	3	0	1	0	3	0	—		7	0
Vllaznia Shkodër	Total	31	11	5	1	3	0	0	0	39	12
Career total		400	213	14	2	20	1	3	1	437	217

=== International ===
As of match played on 13 March 2002

Appearances and goals by national team and year
National team	Year	Apps	Goals
Albania	2000	3	1
Albania	2001	0	0
Albania	2002	1	0
Total		4	1

Albania score listed first, score column indicates score after each Sinani goal.

International goals by date, venue, cap, opponent, score, result and competition
No.	Date	Venue	Cap	Opponent	Score	Result	Competition
1	10 February 2000	Ta' Qali Stadium, Ta' Qali, Malta	2	Malta	1–0	1–0	2000 Rothmans International Tournament

== Honours ==
Vllaznia Shkodër

- Albanian Superliga: 1997–98, 2000–01
- Albanian Cup: 2007–08
- Albanian Supercup: 1998, 2001

Tirana

- Albanian Superliga: 2006–07
- Albanian Supercup: 2006

Besa Kavajë

- Albanian Cup: 2009–10

Individual

- Albanian Superliga Golden Boot: 2003–04, 2006–07, 2007–08
- Albanian Cup top scorer: 2003–04
- Top goalscorer in Albanian Superliga history: 208 goals
- Top goalscorer in Vllaznia Shkodër history: 178 goals
