= 1997–98 Albanian Cup =

Kupa e Shqipërisë

Tournament details
- Country: Albania

Final positions
- Champions: Apolonia
- Runners-up: Lushnja

1997–98 Albanian Cup (Albanian: Kupa e Shqipërisë) was the forty-sixth season of Albania's annual cup competition. It began in August 1997 with the First Round and ended in June 1998 with the Final match. The winners of the competition qualified for the 1998–99 first round of the UEFA Cup. Partizani were the defending champions, having won their fourteenth Albanian Cup last season. The cup was won by Apolonia.

The rounds were played in a two-legged format similar to those of European competitions. If the aggregated score was tied after both games, the team with the higher number of away goals advanced. If the number of away goals was equal in both games, the match was decided by extra time and a penalty shootout, if necessary.

== First round ==
Games were played on August & September 1997

Team 1	Agg.	Team 2	1st leg	2nd leg
Egnatia	4–11	Flamurtari	3–3	1–8
Kastrioti	0–7	Tirana	0–3	0–4
Burreli	2–5	Vllaznia	2–3	0–2
Albpetrol	1–5	Apolonia	0–3	1–2
Albanët	0–4	Partizani	0–3	0–1
Memaliaj	2–5	Shkumbini	0–0	2–5
Durrësi	2–4	Laçi	1–2	1–2
Përmeti	2–3	Lushnja	2–1	0–2
Cërriku	5–8	Besa	2–2	3–6
Erzeni	0–3	Teuta	0–0	0–3
Skënderbeu	2–1	Sopoti	1–0	1–1
Naftëtari	0–2	Tomori	0–0	0–2
Pogradeci	0–4	Elbasani	0–2	0–2
Tepelena	6–9	Bylis	3–1	3–8
Butrinti	3–4	Shqiponja	2–2	1–2
Besëlidhja	0–5	Dinamo Tirana	0–2	0–3

== Second round ==
All sixteen teams of the 1996–97 Superliga and First Division entered in this round. First and second legs were played in January 1998.

Team 1	Agg.	Team 2	1st leg	2nd leg
Teuta	1–4	Partizani	1–1	0–3
Shqiponja	2–6	Lushnja	1–0	1–6
Tomori	1–4	Laçi	1–2	0–2
Elbasani	2–1	Shkumbini	2–0	0–1
Dinamo Tirana	2–3	Apolonia	0–2	2–1
Bylis	2–7	Vllaznia	1–2	1–5
Skënderbeu	5–5 (5–6 p)	Flamurtari	4–1	1–4
Besa	2–3	Tirana	2–3	0–0

== Quarter-finals ==
In this round entered the 8 winners from the previous round.

Team 1	Agg.	Team 2	1st leg	2nd leg
Partizani	1–1 (a)	Vllaznia	1–1	0–0
Laçi	2–1	Tirana	2–1	0–0
Lushnja	7–4	Flamurtari	5–2	2–2
Elbasani	4–5	Apolonia	4–1	0–4

== Semi-finals ==
In this round entered the four winners from the previous round.

Team 1	Agg.	Team 2	1st leg	2nd leg
Vllaznia	3–5	Lushnja	3–0	0–5
Laçi	1–2	Apolonia	1–0	0–2

== Final ==
6 June 1998
17:00

Apolonia	1–0	Lushnja
Haxhiaj 70'

Qemal Stafa Stadium, Tirana
Attendance: 17,000
Referee: Sokol Jareci
