= Alfred Deliallisi =

Albanian footballer (born 1993)

Personal information
- Date of birth: 28 March 1993 (age 33)
- Place of birth: Shijak, Albania
- Height: 1.77 m (5 ft 10 in)
- Position: Central midfielder

Youth career
- 2008–2010: Shkëndija Durrës
- 2010–2012: Teuta

Senior career*
Years	Team	Apps	(Gls)
2011–2015	Teuta	63	(2)
2014	→ Besa (loan)	9	(1)
2015–2017	Kamza	39	(1)
2017	Erzeni	12	(0)
2018	Besa	11	(0)
2018–2021	Vora	16	(0)
2021–2022	Erzeni	12	(0)

International career
2009–2010	Albania U17	3	(0)
2010–2011	Albania U19	3	(0)
2012–2014	Albania U21	3	(0)

Managerial career
- 2022–2023: Erzeni (assistant)
- 2023–2024: Erzeni
- 2025–2026: Korabi
- 2026–: Partizani B
- 2026–: Partizani(i)
- * Club domestic league appearances and goals

Alfred Deliallisi (born 28 March 1993) is an Albanian football manager and a former player who played as a central midfielder.
