= 2023 Albanian Supercup =

| Partizani | Egnatia |
| 1 | 0 |
- Date: 20 December 2023
- Venue: Arena Kombëtare, Tirana
- Referee: Enea Jorgji

The 2023 Albanian Supercup was the 30th edition of the Albanian Supercup, an annual Albanian football match. The teams were decided by taking the trophy winners of the previous season's Kategoria Superiore champions and the winners of the Albanian Cup.

The match was contested by Partizani, champions of the 2022–23 Kategoria Superiore, and Egnatia, the 2022–23 Albanian Cup winners.

== Details ==
20 December 2023
19:00 CET

| Partizani | 1−0 | Egnatia |
|---|---|---|
| Rrapaj 37' |

Arena Kombëtare, Tirana
Referee: Enea Jorgji

Match officials:
Assistant referees:
Denis Rexha
Ridiger Çokaj
Fourth official:
Florjan Lata
Video Assistant Referee:
Kreshnik Barjamaj
Assistant video assistant referee:
Emanuela Rusta

Match rules

- 90 minutes
- 30 minutes extra-time if the scores still level
- Penalty shoot-out if scores still level
- Six named substitutes, of which three may be used and additional fourth if extra-time is played

== See also ==
- 2022–23 Kategoria Superiore
- 2022–23 Albanian Cup
