= 2000–01 Kategoria e Dytë =

Kategoria e Dytë
- Season: 2000–01
- Champions: Partizani
- Promoted: Partizani; Erzeni
- Relegated: Ilir Viking; Poliçani

The 2000–01 Kategoria e Dytë was the 54th season of a second-tier association football league in Albania.

== North group ==
Pos	Team	Pld	W	D	L	GF	GA	GD	Pts	Qualification
1	Erzeni	16	14	0	2	50	12	+38	42	Qualification to the Promotion playoff
2	Kastrioti	16	11	1	4	41	16	+25	34	Qualification to the Promotion playoff
3	Burreli	16	9	2	5	27	21	+6	29	
4	Përparimi	16	9	2	5	29	24	+5	29	
5	Laçi	16	5	3	8	20	28	−8	18	
6	Ada	16	5	1	10	20	26	−6	16	
7	Korabi	15	4	3	8	19	31	−12	15	
8	Shkodra	15	3	1	11	26	45	−19	10	
9	Minatori (Rr)	16	1	7	8	14	41	−27	10	

Source: rsssf.org

== Centre group ==
Pos	Team	Pld	W	D	L	GF	GA	GD	Pts	Qualification or relegation
1	Elbasani	16	14	0	2	51	10	+41	42	Qualification to the Promotion playoff
2	Sopoti	16	6	6	4	20	13	+7	24	Qualification to the Promotion playoff
3	Egnatia	16	7	3	6	23	17	+6	24	
4	Dajti	16	7	2	7	22	22	0	23	
5	Naftëtari	16	7	2	7	24	28	−4	23	
6	Gramozi	16	4	7	5	13	22	−9	19	
7	Pogradeci	16	5	3	8	17	22	−5	18	
8	Devolli	16	3	5	8	12	38	−26	14	
9	Ilir Viking (R)	16	2	6	8	17	27	−10	12	Relegation to 2001–02 Kategoria e Tretë

Source: rsssf.org
(R) Relegated

== South group ==
Pos	Team	Pld	W	D	L	GF	GA	GD	Pts	Qualification or relegation
1	Partizani	16	13	1	2	57	5	+52	40	Qualification to the Promotion playoff
2	Minatori (T)	16	11	3	2	48	18	+30	36	Qualification to the Promotion playoff
3	Albpetrol	16	11	2	3	37	11	+26	35	
4	Delvina	16	9	0	7	25	23	+2	25 (Note: 2 points deducted?)	
5	Përmeti	16	5	2	9	11	33	−22	17	
6	Memaliaj	16	4	3	9	12	27	−15	15	
7	Këlcyra	16	4	2	10	16	33	−17	14	
8	Butrinti	16	3	3	10	16	33	−17	12	
9	Poliçani (R)	16	3	0	13	20	49	−29	9	Relegation to 2001–02 Kategoria e Tretë

Source: rsssf.org
(R) Relegated

== Championship/promotion playoff ==
- Played at neutral venues in Tirana, Elbasan, Durrës and Kuçovë.

Pos	Team	Pld	W	D	L	GF	GA	GD	Pts	Promotion
1	Partizani (C, P)	5	4	1	0	12	2	+10	13	Promotion to 2001–02 National Championship
2	Erzeni (P)	5	3	2	0	6	1	+5	11	Promotion to 2001–02 National Championship
3	Elbasani	5	3	1	1	6	3	+3	10	
4	Minatori (T)	5	1	1	3	6	12	−6	4	
5	Sopoti	5	0	2	3	2	8	−6	2	
6	Kastrioti	5	0	1	4	3	9	−6	1	

Source: rsssf.org
(C) Champions; (P) Promoted
