= 1998–99 Albanian Cup =

Kupa e Shqipërisë

Tournament details
- Country: Albania

Final positions
- Champions: Tirana
- Runners-up: Vllaznia

1998–99 Albanian Cup (Albanian: Kupa e Shqipërisë) was the forty-seventh season of Albania's annual cup competition. It began in August 1998 with the First Round and ended in May 1999 with the Final match. The winners of the competition qualified for the 1999-2000 first round of the UEFA Europa League. Apolonia were the defending champions, having won their first Albanian Cup last season. The cup was won by Tirana.

The rounds were played in a two-legged format similar to those of European competitions. If the aggregated score was tied after both games, the team with the higher number of away goals advanced. If the number of away goals was equal in both games, the match was decided by extra time and a penalty shootout, if necessary.

== First round ==
Games were played on August & September 1998

Team 1	Agg.	Team 2	1st leg	2nd leg
Porto Shëngjin	0–3	Dinamo Tirana	0–1	0–2
Shkodra	2–9	Vllaznia	0–3	2–6
Albanët Tiranë	2–3	Tirana	1–2	1–1
Erzeni	2–13	Partizani	1–6	1–7
Egnatia	3–6	Shkumbini	2–2	1–4
Besëlidhja	3–3 (a)	Teuta	3–1	0–2
Sopoti	0–11	Elbasani	0–4	0–7
Iliria	1–4	Apolonia	1–2	0–2
Burreli	4–3	Laçi	2–2	2–1
Plugu	1–8	Lushnja	0–5	1–3
Naftëtari	0–9	Tomori	0–2	0–7
Gramozi	2–7	Skënderbeu	0–2	2–5
Memaliaj	2–8	Bylis	1–2	1–6
Kastrioti	1–4	Besa	1–0	0–4
Albpetrol	2–8	Flamurtari	0–4	2–4
Butrinti	3–5	Shqiponja	1–2	2–3

== Second round ==
All sixteen teams of the 1997–98 Superliga and First Division entered in this round. First and second legs were played in January 1999.

Team 1	Agg.	Team 2	1st leg	2nd leg
Besa	3–3 (2–3 p)	Partizani	2–1	1–2
Burreli	1–5	Apolonia	1–3	0–3 (w/o)
Bylis	2–2	Lushnja	2–2	0–0
Dinamo Tirana	1–5	Teuta	0–0	1–5
Flamurtari	4–3	Shkumbini	3–0	1–3
Shqiponja	4–3	Elbasani	2–2	2–1
Skënderbeu	1–2	Tirana	0–0	1–2
Tomori	2–6	Vllaznia	1–1	1–5

== Quarter-finals ==
In this round entered the 8 winners from the previous round.

Team 1	Agg.	Team 2	1st leg	2nd leg
Tirana	3–2	Lushnja	2–1	1–1
Apolonia	3–2	Partizani	2–0	1–2
Teuta	2–2	Flamurtari	2–1	0–1
Vllaznia	5–0	Shqiponja	2–0	3–0 (w/o)

== Semi-finals ==
In this round entered the four winners from the previous round.

Team 1	Agg.	Team 2	1st leg	2nd leg
Tirana	4–1	Flamurtari	2–0	2–1
Vllaznia	7–5	Apolonia	5–1	2–4

== Final ==
22 May 1999
19:00

Tirana	0–0	Vllaznia
Penalties
Alimehmeti (penalty scored); Muka (penalty scored); Duro (penalty missed); Tafaj (penalty scored)	3–0	(penalty missed) Noga; (penalty missed) Sinani; (penalty missed) Liçi

Qemal Stafa Stadium, Tirana
Attendance: 13,500
Referee: Sazan Velçani
