= 2009 Albanian Supercup =

- Event: Albanian Supercup
KF Tirana	KS Flamurtari
1	0
- Date: August 16, 2009
- Venue: Qemal Stafa Stadium, Tirana
- Referee: Albano Janku
- Attendance: 300

The 2009 Albanian Supercup is the 16th edition of the Albanian Supercup since its establishment in 1989. The match was contested between the 2009 Cup winners KS Flamurtari and the 2008–09 Albanian Superliga champions KF Tirana.

== Details ==
16 August 2009
20:30 CET

KF Tirana	1–0	Flamurtari Vlorë
Abilaliaj 73'	Report

Qemal Stafa Stadium, Tirana
Attendance: 300
Referee: Albano Janku

== See also ==
- 2008–09 Albanian Superliga
- 2008–09 Albanian Cup
