= 1991 Albanian Supercup =

- Event: Albanian Supercup
Flamurtari Vlorë	Partizani Tirana
1	0
- Date: 11 January 1992
- Venue: Qemal Stafa Stadium, Tirana
- Referee: Besnik Kaimi
- Attendance: 1,500

The 1991 Albanian Supercup was the third edition of the Albanian Supercup, an annual Albanian football match. The match was contested by Flamurtari Vlorë, champions of the 1990–91 Albanian Superliga, and Partizani Tirana, winners of the 1990–91 Albanian Cup. It was held at the Qemal Stafa Stadium on 11 January 1992.

Flamurtari Vlorë won the match 1–0 thanks to a 65th-minute winner by Viktor Daullja, thus clinching their second Supercup title.

== Match details ==
11 January 1992
14:00 CET

Flamurtari Vlorë	1–0	Partizani Tirana
Daullja 65'

Qemal Stafa Stadium, Tirana
Attendance: 1,500
Referee: Besnik Kaimi

== See also ==
- 1990–91 Albanian Superliga
- 1990–91 Albanian Cup
