= 2001–02 Albanian National Championship =

Albanian National Championship
- Season: 2001–02
- Dates: 21 September 2001 – 25 May 2002
- Champions: Dinamo Tirana; 17th Albanian title
- Relegated: Luftëtari; Tomori
- Champions League: Dinamo Tirana
- UEFA Cup: Tirana; Partizani
- Intertoto Cup: Teuta
- Matches: 182
- Goals: 467 (2.57 per match)
- Top goalscorer: Indrit Fortuzi (24 goals)

The 2001–02 Albanian National Championship was the 63rd season of the Albanian National Championship, the top professional league for association football clubs, since its establishment in 1930.

== Teams ==
=== Stadia and last season ===
Locations of the 2001–02 Albanian National Championship teams

Team	Location	Stadium	Capacity	Last season
Apolonia	Fier	Loni Papuçiu Stadium	10,000	10th
Besëlidhja	Lezhë	Brian Filipi Stadium	5,000	7th
Bylis	Ballsh	Adush Muça Stadium	6,000	4th
Dinamo Tirana	Tirana	Qemal Stafa Stadium (Note: Dinamo Tirana, Partizani and Tirana all shared the Qemal Stafa Stadium as well as the Selman Stërmasi Stadium.)	19,700	3rd
Erzeni	Shijak	Tefik Jashari Stadium	4,000	Kategoria e Dytë
Flamurtari	Vlorë	Flamurtari Stadium	15,000	11th
Luftëtari	Gjirokastër	Gjirokastër Stadium	9,000	8th
Lushnja	Lushnjë	Abdurrahman Roza Haxhiu Stadium	12,000	9th
Partizani	Tirana	Qemal Stafa Stadium	19,700	Kategoria e Dytë
Shkumbini	Peqin	Shkumbini Stadium	6,000	5th
Teuta	Durrës	Niko Dovana Stadium	12,040	6th
Tirana	Tirana	Qemal Stafa Stadium	19,700	2nd
Tomori	Berat	Tomori Stadium	14,750	12th
Vllaznia	Shkodër	Loro Boriçi Stadium	15,000	Champions

== League table ==
Pos	Team	Pld	W	D	L	GF	GA	GD	Pts	Qualification or relegation
1	Dinamo Tirana (C)	26	19	6	1	55	15	+40	63	Qualification for the Champions League first qualifying round
2	Tirana	26	19	5	2	52	15	+37	62	Qualification for the UEFA Cup qualifying round (Note: Tirana qualified for the UEFA Cup qualifying round by winning the 2001–02 Albanian Cup, therefore forfeiting their UEFA Intertoto Cup first round place that they had won.)
3	Partizani	26	13	7	6	41	24	+17	46	Qualification for the UEFA Cup qualifying round
4	Teuta	26	12	6	8	31	19	+12	42	Qualification for the Intertoto Cup first round
5	Vllaznia	26	12	4	10	44	27	+17	40	
6	Shkumbini	26	10	3	13	32	36	−4	33	
7	Lushnja	26	8	7	11	32	32	0	31	
8	Flamurtari	26	8	5	13	26	32	−6	29	
9	Apolonia	26	9	2	15	22	48	−26	29	
10	Besëlidhja	26	6	10	10	20	25	−5	28	
11	Bylis	26	7	7	12	28	42	−14	28	
12	Erzeni	26	9	1	16	31	54	−23	28	
13	Luftëtari (R)	26	8	3	15	24	50	−26	27	Relegation to the 2002–03 Kategoria e Dytë
14	Tomori (R)	26	7	4	15	29	48	−19	25	Relegation to the 2002–03 Kategoria e Dytë

Source: RSSSF.org
Rules for classification: 1) points; 2) points in head-to-head matches; 3) goal difference in head-to-head matches; 4) goals scored in head-to-head matches; 5) total goal difference; 6) total goals scored; 7) draw
(C) Champions; (R) Relegated

== Results ==
Home \ Away	APO	BYL	BSL	DIN	ERZ	FLA	LUF	LUS	PAR	SKU	TEU	TIR	TOM	VLL
Apolonia		2–0	1–1	1–2	2–1	2–0	1–1	1–0	3–1	2–0	1–3	1–0	1–0	1–2
Bylis	4–1		0–0	1–1	2–1	2–0	5–3	1–1	1–1	0–1	2–1	0–0	2–1	1–0
Besëlidhja	4–0	1–1		0–0	1–0	1–0	1–0	0–2	0–0	1–0	0–1	0–0	5–1	0–0
Dinamo	3–0	4–0	3–0		3–0	2–1	5–0	4–1	0–1	1–0	2–0	3–1	1–1	3–1
Erzeni	1–0	1–0	2–1	0–2		2–3	3–0	2–1	0–1	2–1	3–2	1–3	1–0	5–2
Flamurtari	4–1	2–0	0–0	1–2	2–1		1–0	1–1	1–1	2–1	1–0	0–1	4–2	0–2
Luftëtari	0–1	2–1	1–0	1–2	3–0	1–0		1–1	3–2	3–0	1–0	0–2	2–0	0–0
Lushnja	3–0	4–1	1–1	0–3	1–1	1–0	2–1		1–2	4–0	1–0	0–1	0–0	2–1
Partizani	4–0	3–2	2–0	0–2	5–0	3–0	2–0	3–1		5–2	1–1	0–0	1–0	0–0
Shkumbini	2–0	1–0	2–0	0–0	4–2	0–0	7–0	3–2	2–1		0–2	0–1	2–0	2–1
Teuta	1–0	1–1	0–0	1–1	2–0	1–0	5–0	1–0	1–1	1–0		0–1	1–1	2–1
Tirana	3–0	6–0	3–1	2–2	4–1	1–1	2–1	2–1	2–0	4–1	1–0		4–2	1–0
Tomori	2–0	1–0	3–2	2–3	3–1	3–2	5–0	0–0	0–1	1–0	0–2	0–4		0–2
Vllaznia	6–0	3–1	2–0	0–1	6–0	1–0	2–0	2–1	2–0	1–1	0–2	0–3	7–1	

Source: RSSSF.org
Legend: Blue = home team win; Yellow = draw; Red = away team win.

== Season statistics ==
=== Top goalscorers ===
Rank	Player	Club	Goals
1	(Albania) Indrit Fortuzi	Tirana	24
2	(Albania) Fjodor Xhafa	Tirana	12
3	(Albania) Vioresin Sinani	Vllaznia	11
3	(Brazil) Abílio	Partizani	11
3	(Albania) Fatjon Ymeri	Erzeni	11
6	(Brazil) Antonio Carioca	Partizani	10
6	(Albania) Daniel Xhafaj	Dinamo Tirana	10
6	(Albania) Klodian Asllani	Dinamo Tirana	10
9	(Albania) Dorian Bubeqi	Bylis	9
10	(Albania) Albert Kaçi	Vllaznia	8
10	(Albania) Klodian Arbëri	Tomori	8
10	(Albania) Vaskë Ruko	Apolonia	8
