= 1997–98 Albanian National Championship =

Albanian National Championship
- Season: 1997–98
- Dates: 14 September 1997 – 30 May 1998
- Champions: Vllaznia; 8th Albanian title
- Relegated: Shqiponja; Sopoti; Albpetrol
- Champions League: Vllaznia
- UEFA Cup: Tirana
- Cup Winners' Cup: Apolonia
- Matches: 301
- Goals: 781 (2.59 per match)
- Top goalscorer: Dorian Bubeqi (26 goals)

The 1997–98 Albanian National Championship was the 59th season of the Albanian National Championship, the top professional league for association football clubs, since its establishment in 1930.

== Teams ==
=== Stadia and last season ===
Locations of the 1997–98 Albanian National Championship teams

| Team | Location | Stadium | Capacity | Last season |
|---|---|---|---|---|
| Albpetrol | Patos | Alush Noga Stadium | 2,150 | 17th |
| Apolonia | Fier | Loni Papuçiu Stadium | 10,000 | 5th |
| Besa | Kavajë | Besa Stadium | 8,000 | 11th |
| Bylis | Ballsh | Adush Muça Stadium | 6,000 | 14th |
| Dinamo Tirana | Tirana | Qemal Stafa Stadium (Note: Dinamo Tirana, Partizani and Tirana all shared the Qemal Stafa Stadium as well as the Selman Stërmasi Stadium.) | 19,700 | 16th |
| Elbasani | Elbasan | Ruzhdi Bizhuta Stadium | 15,000 | 13th |
| Flamurtari | Vlorë | Flamurtari Stadium | 15,000 | 3rd |
| Laçi | Laç | Laçi Stadium | 5,000 | 10th |
| Lushnja | Lushnjë | Abdurrahman Roza Haxhiu Stadium | 12,000 | 7th |
| Partizani | Tirana | Qemal Stafa Stadium | 19,700 | 4th |
| Skënderbeu | Korçë | Skënderbeu Stadium | 12,000 | 15th |
| Sopoti | Librazhd | Sopoti Stadium | 3,000 | 9th |
| Shkumbini | Peqin | Shkumbini Stadium | 6,000 | 6th |
| Shqiponja | Gjirokastër | Gjirokastër Stadium | 9,000 | 18th |
| Teuta | Durrës | Niko Dovana Stadium | 12,040 | 8th |
| Tirana | Tirana | Qemal Stafa Stadium | 19,700 | Champions |
| Tomori | Berat | Tomori Stadium | 14,750 | 12th |
| Vllaznia | Shkodër | Loro Boriçi Stadium | 15,000 | 2nd |

== League table ==
| Pos | Team | Pld | W | D | L | GF | GA | GD | Pts | Qualification or relegation |
|---|---|---|---|---|---|---|---|---|---|---|
| 1 | Vllaznia (C) | 34 | 22 | 6 | 6 | 42 | 24 | +18 | 72 | Qualification for the Champions League first qualifying round |
| 2 | Tirana | 34 | 19 | 8 | 7 | 54 | 19 | +35 | 65 | Qualification for the UEFA Cup first qualifying round |
| 3 | Partizani | 34 | 20 | 4 | 10 | 62 | 27 | +35 | 64 | |
| 4 | Shkumbini | 34 | 17 | 3 | 14 | 56 | 49 | +7 | 54 | |
| 5 | Teuta | 34 | 17 | 3 | 14 | 39 | 39 | 0 | 54 | |
| 6 | Elbasani | 34 | 16 | 4 | 14 | 48 | 31 | +17 | 52 | |
| 7 | Apolonia | 34 | 15 | 7 | 12 | 38 | 34 | +4 | 52 | Qualification for the Cup Winners' Cup qualifying round |
| 8 | Laçi | 34 | 15 | 3 | 16 | 47 | 49 | −2 | 48 | |
| 9 | Lushnja | 34 | 14 | 5 | 15 | 54 | 38 | +16 | 47 | |
| 10 | Tomori | 34 | 15 | 2 | 17 | 37 | 45 | −8 | 47 | |
| 11 | Skënderbeu | 34 | 13 | 7 | 14 | 40 | 50 | −10 | 46 | |
| 12 | Dinamo Tirana | 34 | 12 | 9 | 13 | 42 | 36 | +6 | 45 | |
| 13 | Bylis | 34 | 13 | 6 | 15 | 41 | 39 | +2 | 45 | |
| 14 | Besa | 34 | 13 | 5 | 16 | 48 | 47 | +1 | 44 | |
| 15 | Flamurtari | 34 | 12 | 7 | 15 | 38 | 41 | −3 | 43 | |
| 16 | Shqiponja (R) | 34 | 12 | 4 | 18 | 34 | 58 | −24 | 40 | Relegation to the 1998–99 Kategoria e Dytë |
| 17 | Sopoti (R) | 34 | 10 | 5 | 19 | 39 | 64 | −25 | 35 | Relegation to the 1998–99 Kategoria e Dytë |
| 18 | Albpetrol (R) | 34 | 5 | 4 | 25 | 24 | 93 | −69 | 19 | Relegation to the 1998–99 Kategoria e Dytë |

Source: RSSSF.org
Rules for classification: 1) Points; 2) Head-to-head points; 3) Head-to-head goal difference; 4) Head-to-head goals scored; 5) Goal difference; 6) Goals scored; 7) Draw.
(C) Champions; (R) Relegated

== Results ==
| Home \ Away | ALB | APO | BES | BYL | DIN | ELB | FLA | LAÇ | LUS | PAR | SKË | SOP | SKU | SHQ | TEU | TIR | TOM | VLL |
|---|---|---|---|---|---|---|---|---|---|---|---|---|---|---|---|---|---|---|
| Albpetrol | | 1–3 | 0–0 | 2–1 | 1–2 | 1–2 | 1–1 | 3–0 | 1–0 | 2–5 | 0–0 | 3–0 | 2–2 | 0–2 | 1–0 | 1–3 | 1–3 | 1–2 |
| Apolonia | 1–0 | | 1–0 | 1–1 | 1–0 | 1–0 | 1–1 | 4–0 | 1–0 | 2–1 | 5–1 | 2–2 | 1–0 | 5–2 | 1–0 | 0–1 | 1–0 | 3–0 |
| Besa | 4–0 | 1–0 | | 4–1 | 0–1 | 1–0 | 1–0 | 2–1 | 0–4 | 0–1 | 6–1 | 3–2 | 2–0 | 5–0 | 0–1 | 2–4 | 2–1 | 0–1 |
| Bylis | 4–0 | 3–1 | 2–1 | | 0–0 | 2–1 | 1–0 | 1–0 | 2–1 | 0–1 | 2–0 | 5–0 | 2–0 | 5–1 | 0–1 | 0–0 | 1–0 | 2–2 |
| Dinamo | 5–0 | 1–1 | 2–2 | 1–0 | | 0–4 | 1–0 | 7–1 | 3–1 | 0–1 | 3–1 | 2–0 | 4–0 | 0–0 | 0–0 | 1–4 | 0–2 | 0–1 |
| Elbasani | 1–0 | 3–0 | 0–1 | 0–0 | 0–0 | | 1–0 | 5–2 | 2–1 | 1–0 | 4–1 | 5–0 | 1–0 | 3–0 | 2–0 | 0–0 | 5–0 | 2–0 |
| Flamurtari | 4–0 | 0–1 | 2–0 | 2–1 | 0–0 | 1–0 | | 3–1 | 0–0 | 2–1 | 2–0 | 1–0 | 2–2 | 2–0 | 2–0 | 2–0 | 0–0 | 0–0 |
| Laçi | 7–0 | 4–0 | 2–0 | 2–1 | 1–0 | 1–0 | 2–1 | | 2–0 | 3–0 | 1–2 | 1–0 | 1–0 | 4–1 | 4–1 | 0–3 | 2–1 | 0–0 |
| Lushnja | 5–0 | 0–0 | 3–1 | 1–3 | 0–1 | 1–3 | 2–1 | 2–0 | | 2–1 | 3–1 | 3–0 | 4–0 | 4–0 | 2–0 | 1–0 | 5–0 | 1–1 |
| Partizani | 5–0 | 0–0 | 3–0 | 3–1 | 2–3 | 2–0 | 8–3 | 3–0 | 1–0 | | 2–1 | 5–0 | 1–0 | 1–1 | 3–0 | 0–0 | 3–1 | 3–0 |
| Skënderbeu | 1–0 | 2–0 | 3–3 | 0–0 | 0–0 | 3–0 | 6–1 | 1–1 | 2–0 | 0–0 | | 3–0 | 1–0 | 2–1 | 1–0 | 1–0 | 1–0 | 3–2 |
| Sopoti | 4–0 | 1–0 | 3–2 | 3–0 | 2–1 | 2–2 | 0–1 | 2–1 | 1–1 | 1–3 | 4–0 | | 5–6 | 0–0 | 2–0 | 0–0 | 2–1 | 0–1 |
| Shkumbini | 3–1 | 2–0 | 2–0 | 3–0 | 3–2 | 2–0 | 3–2 | 2–1 | 3–1 | 1–0 | 1–0 | 4–0 | | 2–0 | 3–1 | 1–1 | 3–0 | 1–0 |
| Shqiponja | 2–1 | 3–0 | 2–2 | 1–0 | 1–0 | 1–0 | 3–2 | 0–2 | 1–0 | 0–1 | 2–1 | 0–2 | 3–1 | | 2–0 | 0–1 | 4–0 | 0–1 |
| Teuta | 6–1 | 2–1 | 1–0 | 2–0 | 2–1 | 1–0 | 1–0 | 0–0 | 1–0 | 1–0 | 1–1 | 4–0 | 2–1 | 4–1 | | 2–1 | 3–0 | 2–1 |
| Tirana | 8–0 | 0–0 | 1–1 | 2–0 (Note: Match awarded.) | 2–0 | 3–1 | 1–0 | 1–0 | 0–1 | 1–0 | 3–0 | 1–0 | 4–2 | 5–0 | 2–0 | | 1–0 | 1–2 |
| Tomori | 5–0 | 1–0 | 1–2 | 1–0 | 2–0 | 1–0 | 2–0 | 2–0 | 3–3 | 0–2 | 1–0 | 2–1 | 2–1 | 1–0 | 3–0 | 1–0 | | 0–1 |
| Vllaznia | 2–0 | 1–0 | 1–0 | 2–0 | 1–1 | 3–0 | 1–0 | 1–0 | 3–2 | 1–0 | 2–0 | 1–0 | 3–2 | 1–0 | 3–0 | 0–0 | 1–0 | |

Source: RSSSF.org
Legend: Blue = home team win; Yellow = draw; Red = away team win.

== Season statistics ==
=== Top scorers ===
| Rank | Player | Club | Goals |
|---|---|---|---|
| 1 | (Albania) Dorian Bubeqi | Shkumbini | 26 |
| 2 | (Albania) Hekuran Jakupi | Elbasani/Tirana | 24 |
| 2 | (Albania) Artan Bano | Lushnja | 24 |
| 4 | (Albania) Indrit Fortuzi | Tirana | 15 |
| 4 | (Albania) Bardhyl Elezi | Lushnja | 15 |
| 6 | (Albania) Ilir Selimi | Shqiponja | 13 |
| 6 | (Albania) Erjon Bogdani | Partizani | 13 |
| 6 | (Albania) Edmond Gjata | Tomori | 13 |
| 9 | (Albania) Klodian Asllani | Bylis/Dinamo Tirana | 11 |
| 10 | (Albania) Edi Koleci | Skënderbeu | 10 |
| 10 | (Albania) Jeton Gashi | Dinamo Tirana | 10 |
| 10 | (Albania) Gentian Begeja | Teuta | 10 |
| 10 | (Albania) Edmond Kodra | Besa | 10 |
