= 2005 Albanian Supercup =

- Event: Albanian Supercup
| KF Tirana | KS Teuta |
| 0 | 0 |
- KF Tirana won 5–4 on penalties
- Date: August 21, 2005
- Venue: Qemal Stafa Stadium, Tirana
- Referee: Albano Janku
- Attendance: 3,500

The 2005 Albanian Supercup is the 12th edition of the Albanian Supercup since its establishment in 1989. The match was contested between the Albanian Cup 2005 winners KS Teuta and the 2004–05 Albanian Superliga champions KF Tirana.

The regular and extra time result ended goalless, therefore the verdict of penalty shoot-outs 5-4 crowned KF Tirana winners of the Supercup for the 5th time, three of these trophies won over the same team, KS Teuta.

== Details ==
21 August 2005

| KF Tirana | 0–0 (a.e.t.) | KS Teuta |
Penalties
| Muka (penalty scored); Sina (penalty scored); Salihi (penalty scored); Pisha (penalty scored); Rraklli (penalty scored) | 5–4 | (penalty scored) Mançaku; (penalty scored) Qerimi; (penalty scored) Kapllani; (penalty scored) Hodo; (penalty missed) Neziri |

Qemal Stafa Stadium, Tirana
Attendance: 3,500
Referee: Albano Janku

== See also ==
- 2004–05 Albanian Superliga
- Albanian Cup 2005
