= Rigels Qose =

Albanian footballer

Personal information
- Full name: Rigels Qose
- Date of birth: 3 August 1977 (age 49)
- Place of birth: Korçë, Albania
- Position: Forward

Senior career*
Years	Team	Apps	(Gls)
1995–2001	Skënderbeu	92	(39)
2001–2003	Dinamo Tirana	54	(7)
2005	WM Pioneers	21	(12)
2006	Partizani	15	(1)
- Skënderbeu (USA)
Total		182	(59)

International career
1993	Albania U-16		(1)
1999	Albania U-21	4	(0)
- * Club domestic league appearances and goals

Rigels Qose (born 3 August 1977, in Korçë) is an Albanian former football player who played for Skënderbeu Korçë, Dinamo Tirana, Western Mass Pioneers, Partizani Tirana and Skënderbeu in the USA.

== Playing career ==
=== Club ===
After a lengthy career in Albania, Qosa moved to the United States in 2005 to end up in the All League First Team after a season with Western Mass Pioneers for whom he scored 12 in 21 games. He also won a league title with an American amateur side called Skënderbeu.

=== International ===
Qosa scored the only goal when Albania beat Portugal 1–0 in Tirana in a UEFA European Under-16 Championship qualifier on 3 March 1993.

== Coaching career ==
Qosa was appointed technical director at Long Island Rough Riders, where he had been working since 2012. He had earlier been working as head coach of Long Island's clubs Royal FC and SUSA.

== Honours ==
- Albanian Superliga: 1

2002
