= 2001–02 Albanian Cup =

Republic Cup Kupa e Shqipërisë

Tournament details
- Country: Albania
- Dates: 18 August 2001 – 1 June 2002
- Teams: 32

Final positions
- Champions: Tirana
- Runners-up: Dinamo Tirana

Tournament statistics
- Matches played: 61
- Goals scored: 157 (2.57 per match)
- Top goal scorer: Indrit Fortuzi (7 goals)

2001–02 Albanian Cup (Albanian: Kupa e Shqipërisë) was the 50th season of Albania's annual cup competition. It began on August 18, 2001, with the First Round and ended on June 1, 2002, with the Final match. The winners of the competition qualified for the first round of the 2002-03 UEFA Europa League. Tirana were the defending champions, won their eleventh Albanian Cup this season. The cup was won by Tirana.

The rounds were played in a two-legged format similar to those of European competitions. If the aggregated score was tied after both games, the team with the higher number of away goals advanced. If the number of away goals was equal in both games, the match was decided by extra time and a penalty shootout, if necessary.

== First round ==
Games were played on August 18 & 24 2001.

Team 1	Agg.	Team 2	1st leg	2nd leg
Ada	1–6	Vllaznia	1–2	0–4
Laçi	0–6	Tirana	0–3	0–3
Dajti	2–13	Dinamo Tirana	2–6	0–7
Memaliaj	0–5	Bylis	0–1	0–4
Besa	0–4	Shkumbini	0–1	0–3
Egnatia	1–5	Teuta	0–1	1–4
Delvina	2–5	Luftëtari	2–2	0–3
Përparimi	2–3	Besëlidhja	2–1	0–2
Naftëtari	0–2	Tomori	0–1	0–1
Albpetrol	2–4	Flamurtari	1–1	1–3
Përmeti	0–11	Lushnja	0–1	0–10
Tepelena	2–14	Apolonia	2–1	0–13
Kastrioti	1–5	Partizani	1–1	0–4
Sopoti	2–1	Skënderbeu	2–0	0–1
Gramozi	0–2	Elbasani	0–0	0–2
Burreli	1-3	Erzeni	1–0	0–3

== Second round ==
All sixteen teams of the 2000–01 Superliga and First Division entered in this round. First legs were played on January 26, 2002, and the second legs were played on February 1, 2002.

Team 1	Agg.	Team 2	1st leg	2nd leg
Flamurtari	0–3	Dinamo Tirana	0–2	0–1
Shkumbini	0–2	Elbasani	0–1	0–1
Partizani	1–5	Tirana	0–4	1–1
Sopoti	2–4	Luftëtari	1–1	1–3
Lushnja	1–3	Teuta	0–1	1–2
Apolonia	1–3	Vllaznia	1–2	0–1
Erzeni	2–2 (4–2 p)	Besëlidhja	2–0	0–2
Tomori	3–1	Bylis	2–0	1–1

== Quarter-finals ==
In this round entered the 8 winners from the previous round.

Team 1	Agg.	Team 2	1st leg	2nd leg
Tirana	4–1	Erzeni	3–1	1–0
Teuta	2–1	Tomori	2–0	0–1
Dinamo Tirana	4–2	Luftëtari	1–0	3–2
Vllaznia	2–3	Elbasani	2–1	0–2

9 February 2002	Erzeni	0–1	Tirana	Tefik Jashari Stadium, Shijak
			Bulku 89'

15 February 2002	Tirana	3–1	Erzeni	Selman Stermasi Stadium, Korçë
	Fortuzi (pen.); Merkoçi		Karapici

Tirana advanced to the semi finals.

9 February 2002	Tomori	1–0	Teuta	Tomori Stadium, Burrel
	Arbëri 58'

15 February 2002	Teuta	2–0	Tomori	Niko Dovana Stadium, Durrës
	Memelli 22'; Mançaku 48'

Teuta advanced to the semi finals.

9 February 2002	Luftëtari	2–3	Dinamo Tirana	Gjirokastër Stadium, Gjirokastër
	Shehaj 15'; Romanishin 43'		Xhafa 50'; Çoni 74' (pen.); Asllani 84'

15 February 2002	Dinamo Tirana	1–0	Luftëtari	Qemal Stafa Stadium, Tirana
	Asllani 58'

Dinamo Tirana advanced to the semi finals.

9 February 2002	Elbasani	2–0	Vllaznia	Ruzhdi Bizhuta, Elbasan
	Stojku 30'; Façja 58'

15 February 2002	Vllaznia	2–1	Elbasani	Loro Boriçi Stadium, Shkodër
	Osja 74'; Dalipi 90+3'		Stojku 90+5'

Elbasani advanced to the semi finals.

== Semi-finals ==
In this round entered the four winners from the previous round.

Team 1	Agg.	Team 2	1st leg	2nd leg
Tirana	5–1	Elbasani	3–0	2–1
Dinamo Tirana	2–1	Teuta	1–0	1–1

2 April 2002	Tirana	3–0	Elbasani	Selman Stermasi Stadium, Tirana
	Fortuzi 45' (pen.), 69' (pen.), 88'

10 April 2002	Elbasani	1–2	Tirana	Ruzhdi Bizhuta Stadium, Elbasan
	Bilali 81'		Dede 20'; Halili 80'

Tirana advanced to the final.

3 April 2002	Dinamo Tirana	1–0	Teuta	Qemal Stafa Stadium, Tirana
	Asllani 36'

10 April 2002	Teuta	1–1	Dinamo Tirana	Tefik Jashari Stadium, Shijak
	Rexhepi 70' (pen.)		Qose 31'

Dinamo Tirana advanced to the final.

== Final ==
1 June 2002
18:00

Tirana	1–0	Dinamo Tirana
Fortuzi 30'

Qemal Stafa Stadium, Tirana
Attendance: 3,000
Referee: Sokol Jareci
