= 2004 Albanian Supercup =

- Event: Albanian Supercup
KF Partizani	KF Tirana
2	0
- Date: August 15, 2004
- Venue: Qemal Stafa Stadium, Tirana
- Referee: Aranit Lulaj

The 2004 Albanian Supercup is the 11th edition of the Albanian Supercup since its establishment in 1989. The match was contested between the Albanian Cup 2004 winners KF Partizani and the 2003–04 Albanian Superliga champions KF Tirana. The match took place on 15 August 2004, with Partizani winning 2-nil.

== Match details ==
15 August 2004
16:00 CET

KF Tirana	0–2	Partizani Tirana
		Allmuça 2'; Bylykbashi 25'

Qemal Stafa Stadium, Tirana
Referee: Aranit Lulaj

== See also ==
- 2003–04 Albanian Superliga
- 2003–04 Albanian Cup
