= NITEL Vasco Da Gama F.C. =

Nigerian football club

- Full name: NITEL Vasco Da Gama Football Club
- Nickname: Vasco Da Gama
- Short name: Vasco
- Founded: 1972
- Dissolved: 1996

P & T (later NITEL) Vasco da Gama was a Nigerian football club based in Enugu. It was sponsored by the Post and Telecommunications Department (P & T) of the Ministry of Communications. The team was a founder member of the Nigerian League in 1972 and took its name from Brazilian squad CR Vasco da Gama. The name changed when NITEL was created from the merger of the P & T with the Nigerian External Telecommunications Limited (NET.) in the mid-1980s.

The team was promoted to the premier league in 1993 after finishing second in the Second Division. However they were relegated after one season following a performance of 9 wins 10 ties and 13 losses (41 points). Vasco spent 1995 and 1996 in the second division before its management announced the disbandment of the club late November, 1996.

In 1997, the team's league slot was bought by the Akwa Ibom government and it was reborn as the Ibom Stars FC, the predecessor of Akwa United F.C.
