= 2025 Albanian Supercup =

Egnatia	Dinamo City
1	3
- Date: 28 December 2025
- Venue: Arena Kombëtare, Tirana
- Referee: Enea Jorgji

The 2025 Albanian Supercup was the 32st edition of the Albanian Supercup, an annual Albanian football match. The teams were decided by taking the champions of the previous season's Kategoria Superiore champions and the winners of the Albanian Cup.

The match was contested by Egnatia, champions of the 2024–25 Kategoria Superiore, and Dinamo City, the 2024–25 Albanian Cup winners.

== Details ==
28 December 2025
19:00 CET

Egnatia	1–3	Dinamo City
Ruçi 9'		Bregu 54'; Nani 59'; Qefalija 90+5' (pen.)

Arena Kombëtare, Tirana
Referee: Enea Jorgji

Match officials:
Assistant referees:
Denis Rexha
Ridiger Çokaj
Fourth official:
Juxhin Xhaja
Video Assistant Referee:
Kreshnik Barjamaj
Assistant video assistant referee:
Emanuela Rusta

Match rules

- 90 minutes
- 30 minutes extra-time if the scores still level
- Penalty shoot-out if scores still level
- Six named substitutes, of which three may be used and additional fourth if extra-time is played

== See also ==
- 2024–25 Kategoria Superiore
- 2024–25 Albanian Cup
