= Dorjan Bubeqi =

Albanian footballer and manager

Personal information
- Date of birth: 26 October 1978 (age 48)
- Place of birth: Kavajë, Albania
- Height: 1.76 m (5 ft 9 in)
- Position: Centre forward

Team information
- Current team: Kastrioti (Manager)

Youth career
- 1992–1993: Besa Kavajë

Senior career*
| Years | Team | Apps | (Gls) |
| 1996–1997 | Albpetrol | 16 | (4) |
| 1997–1998 | Shkumbini | 31 | (26) |
| 1998–1999 | Besa Kavajë | 27 | (9) |
| 1999 | Shqiponja | 12 | (3) |
| 2000 | Apolonia Fier | 9 | (6) |
| 2000–2001 | Shkumbini | 13 | (4) |
| 2001–2002 | Bylis Ballsh | 24 | (9) |
| 2002–2003 | Shkumbini | 23 | (10) |
| 2005–2006 | Besa Kavajë | 18 | (5) |
| 2006–2007 | Shkumbini | 30 | (7) |
| 2008–2010 | Lushnja | 42 | (22) |
| 2010–2011 | Tomori Berat | | |
| 2010–2011 | Lushnja | | |
| 2011–2013 | Besa Kavajë | 31 | (5) |

Managerial career
- 2015: Besa Kavajë
- 2016–2017: Erzeni
- 2018–2020: Korabi
- 2020–2021: Erzeni
- 2021–2022: Besa Kavajë
- 2023: Burreli
- 2024: Besa Kavajë
- 2024: Kastrioti
- 2026–: Lushnja
- * Club domestic league appearances and goals

Dorjan Bubeqi (born 26 October 1978) is an Albanian football manager and a former player who serves as manager of Kastrioti in the Albanian First Division.

== Club career ==
Bubeqi began his playing career in Besa Kavajë's youth system as a centre-forward. He was a member of the 1992–93 Besa U19 championship winning team. Bubeqi made his professional league debut on 7 September 1996 for Albpetroli Patos in a 1–3 loss against Dinamo Tirana. The following year he joined Shkumbini Peqin and went on to finish as the league's top scorer with 26 goals. His playing career spanned 17 seasons competing with 8 different clubs. He scored 172 goals in 395 career matches.

== Managerial career ==
In January 2018, he was named coach at Korabi Peshkopi after he had left Erzeni a few days earlier.
