= 2002 Albanian Supercup =

- Event: Albanian Supercup
KF Tirana	Dinamo Tirana
6	0
- Date: September 14, 2002
- Venue: Qemal Stafa Stadium, Tirana
- Referee: Sokol Cekaj, Sokol Avdo, Enver Dode

The 2002 Albanian Supercup was the ninth edition of the Albanian Supercup since its establishment in 1989. The match was contested between the Albanian Cup 2002 winners KF Tirana and the 2001–02 Albanian Superliga champions Dinamo Tirana.

KF Tirana thrashed the blue team by 6–0, this being the biggest win so far in an Albanian Supercup final.

== Match details ==
14 September 2002
19:00 CET

KF Tirana	6–0	Dinamo Tirana
Patushi 14'; Bulku 21'; Halili 38', 46'; Xhafa 51'; Tafaj 90+2'

Qemal Stafa Stadium, Tirana
Referee: Sokol Çekaj

== See also ==
- 2001–02 Albanian Superliga
- 2001–02 Albanian Cup
