= Ferdinand Bilali =

Albanian footballer

Personal information
- Full name: Ferdinand Bilali
- Date of birth: 10 April 1969 (age 57)
- Place of birth: Elbasan, Albania
- Height: 1.83 m (6 ft 0 in)
- Position: Midfielder

Senior career*
Years	Team	Apps	(Gls)
1991–2000	Elbasani	80+	(16+)
1996	Teuta		
1997–1999	Elbasani		
2000–2001	Bylis	22+	(2+)
2001	Erzeni	12	(1)
2002	Elbasani		
2003–2004	Egnatia		

International career
1989–1991	Albania U21	5	(0)
1992	Albania	1	(0)
- * Club domestic league appearances and goals

Ferdinand Bilali (born 10 April 1969) is an Albanian retired footballer who played for KF Elbasani, Bylis Ballsh, Erzeni Shijak and Egnatia, as well as the Albania national team.

== International career ==
He made his debut for Albania as a second-half substitute for Arbën Milori in a September 1992 FIFA World Cup qualification match against Northern Ireland. That remained his sole international game for the senior team. Bilali also appeared in five games for the Albania U21 squad.
