= 2005–06 Albanian Cup =

Kupa e Shqipërisë

Tournament details
- Country: Albania

Final positions
- Champions: Tirana
- Runners-up: Vllaznia

2005–06 Albanian Cup (Albanian: Kupa e Shqipërisë) was the fifty-fourth season of Albania's annual cup competition. It began on 28 August 2005 with the preliminary round and ended on 10 May 2006 with the Final match. The winners of the competition qualified for the 2006-07 first qualifying round of the UEFA Europa League. Teuta were the defending champions, having won their third Albanian Cup last season. The cup was won by KF Tirana.

The rounds were played in a two-legged format similar to those of European competitions. If the aggregated score was tied after both games, the team with the higher number of away goals advanced. If the number of away goals was equal in both games, the match was decided by extra time and a penalty shootout, if necessary.

== Preliminary round ==
Games were played on 28 August – 4 September 2005.

| Team 1 | Agg. | Team 2 | 1st leg | 2nd leg |
|---|---|---|---|---|
| Memaliaj | 2–4 | Delvina | 1–3 | 1–1 |
| Maliqi | 1–2 | Devolli | 1–1 | 0–1 |
| Iliria | 6–2 | Dajti | 3–0 | 3–2 |
| Çakrani | 7–0 | Bylis | 5–0 | 2–0 |
| Tërbuni | 1–4 | Veleçiku | 0–1 | 1–3 |
| Korabi | 2–7 | Burreli | 1–3 | 1–4 |
| Përmeti | 3–1 | Gramozi | 2–0 | 1–1 |
| Gramshi | 3–3 (2–4 p) | Sopoti | 3–0 | 0–3 |

== First round ==
All fourteen teams of the 2004–05 Superliga and First Division entered in this round, along with Preliminary Round winners. Games were played on 20–27 September 2005.

| Team 1 | Agg. | Team 2 | 1st leg | 2nd leg |
|---|---|---|---|---|
| Ada | 1–5 | Partizani | 0–2 | 1–3 |
| Iliria | 2–7 | Tirana | 0–3 | 2–4 |
| Egnatia | 1–4 | Besa | 1–1 | 0–3 |
| Kastrioti | 2–0 | Laçi | 2–0 | 0–0 |
| Erzeni | 0–3 | Shkumbini | 0–1 | 0–2 (w/o) |
| Burreli | 1–5 | Dinamo Tirana | 1–1 | 0–4 |
| Turbina | 2–6 | Elbasani | 2–6 | 0–0 |
| Besëlidhja | 2–4 | Teuta | 1–1 | 1–3 |
| Devolli | 1–1 (3–4 p) | Skenderbeu | 1–0 | 0–1 |
| Tepelena | 2–6 | Apolonia | 2–3 | 0–3 |
| Delvina | 1–4 | Butrinti | 1–2 | 0–2 |
| Veleçiku | 1–11 | Vllaznia | 1–4 | 0–7 |
| Tomori | 1–4 | Lushnja | 1–2 | 0–2 |
| Përmeti | 3–4 | Luftëtari | 3–1 | 0–3 |
| Çakrani | 1–9 | Flamurtari | 1–2 | 0–7 |
| Sopoti | 0–7 | Pogradeci | 0–2 | 0–5 |

== Second round ==
First legs were played on 19 October 2005 and the second legs were played on 26 October 2005.

| Team 1 | Agg. | Team 2 | 1st leg | 2nd leg |
|---|---|---|---|---|
| Besa | 2–3 | Vllaznia | 1–1 | 1–2 |
| Flamurtari | 1–3 | Teuta | 0–2 | 1–1 |
| Butrinti | 1–4 | Shkumbini | 1–0 | 0–4 |
| Luftëtari | 1–4 | Lushnja | 0–1 | 1–3 |
| Pogradeci | 3–5 | Elbasani | 2–0 | 1–5 |
| Kastrioti | 1–3 | Partizani | 1–0 | 0–3 |
| Skenderbeu | 1–8 | Dinamo Tirana | 0–2 | 1–6 |
| Apolonia | 1–6 | Tirana | 0–1 | 2–5 |

== Quarter-finals ==
In this round entered the 8 winners from the previous round.

| Team 1 | Agg. | Team 2 | 1st leg | 2nd leg |
|---|---|---|---|---|
| Tirana | 4–3 | Partizani | 1–1 | 3–2 |
| Teuta | 4–6 | Elbasani | 3–3 | 1–3 |
| Dinamo Tirana | 6–0 | Lushnja | 4–0 | 2–0 |
| Vllaznia | 3–0 | Shkumbini | 1–0 | 2–0 |

== Semi-finals ==
In this round entered the four winners from the previous round.

| Team 1 | Agg. | Team 2 | 1st leg | 2nd leg |
|---|---|---|---|---|
| Tirana | 4–3 | Dinamo Tirana | 4–2 | 0–1 |
| Vllaznia | 3–2 | Elbasani | 2–0 | 1–2 |

| 12 April 2006 | Tirana | 4–2 | Dinamo Tirana | Selman Stermasi Stadium, Tirana |
| | Duro 26' (pen.); Salihi 38', 61'; Muka 85' | | Pema 24'; Goudjabi 66' |

| 26 April 2006 | Dinamo Tirana | 1–0 | Tirana | Qemal Stafa Stadium, Tirana |
| | Xhafa 58' (pen.) |

Tirana advanced to the final.

| 12 April 2006 | Vllaznia | 2–0 | Elbasani | Loro Boriçi Stadium, Shkodër |
| | Sinani 48'; Leandro 75' |

| 26 April 2006 | Elbasani | 2–1 | Vllaznia | Ruzhdi Bizhuta Stadium, Elbasan |
| | Rizvanolli 34'; Qorri 37' | | Ahi 43' |

Vllaznia advanced to the final.

== Final ==
10 May 2006
19:00

| Tirana | 1–0 | Vllaznia |
|---|---|---|
| Duro 65' |

Roza Haxhiu Stadium, Lushnjë
Attendance: 4,400
Referee: Stefano Farina (Italy)
