= 2007 Albanian Supercup =

- Event: Albanian Supercup
KF Tirana	KS Besa
4	2
- Date: August 17, 2007
- Venue: Qemal Stafa Stadium, Tirana

The 2007 Albanian Supercup was the 14th edition of the Albanian Supercup since its establishment in 1989. The match was contested between the Albanian Cup 2007 winners Besa Kavajë and the 2006–07 Albanian Superliga champions KF Tirana.

== Details ==
17 August 2007

KF Tirana	4–2	Besa Kavajë
Mukaj 6'; Dede 49'; Duro 70'; Abazaj 90'		Hoxha 16'; Veliaj 35'

Qemal Stafa Stadium, Tirana

== See also ==
- 2006–07 Albanian Superliga
- Albanian Cup 2007
