= Bledar Mançaku =

Albanian footballer (born 1982)

Bledar Mancaku
Personal information
- Full name: Bledar Mançaku
- Date of birth: 5 January 1982 (age 44)
- Place of birth: Durrës, Albania
- Height: 1.75 m (5 ft 9 in)
- Position: Forward

Youth career
- 1997–1999: Teuta Durrës
- 1999–2001: Gençlerbirliği

Senior career*
Years	Team	Apps	(Gls)
2001–2007	Teuta	165	(53)
2007–2010	Besa	86	(18)
2010–2011	Shkumbini	15	(0)
2011	Besa	12	(1)
2011–2014	Teuta	52	(8)
2014	→ Besa (loan)	13	(2)
2014–2015	Mamurrasi	18	(2)
Total		343	(82)

International career
2000–2003	Albania U21	6	(1)
2002–2003	Albania	2	(0)
- * Club domestic league appearances and goals as of 19 May 2010

Bledar Mançaku (born 5 January 1982) is an Albanian retired footballer who played as a forward.

He has previously played for Teuta Durrës, Shkumbini Peqin and Besa Kavajë at club level and the Albanian under-21 and senior sides internationally.

== Club career ==
On 9 June 2010, Mançaku joined Shkumbini Peqin by penning a two-year contract. The transfer was made official one day later.

On 5 January 2014, Mancaku was sent on loan to fellow Albanian Superliga side Besa Kavajë until the end of 2013–14 season.

After two years as free agent, Mançaku announced his retirement on 9 September 2017.

== International career ==
He made his debut for Albania in a March 2002 friendly match against Mexico in San Diego and earned a total of 2 caps, scoring no goals. His other international was a November 2003 friendly against Estonia.

=== National team statistics ===
Albania national team
Year	Apps	Goals
2002	1	0
2003	1	0
Total	2	0
