= Saimir Patushi =

Albanian footballer

Sajmir Patushi
Personal information
- Full name: Sajmir Patushi
- Date of birth: 28 September 1976 (age 50)
- Place of birth: Burrel, Albania
- Position: Left midfielder

Senior career*
| Years | Team | Apps | (Gls) |
| 1995–1996 | Kastrioti | 19 | (3) |
| 1996–1997 | Partizani | 13 | (1) |
| 1997–1999 | Burreli | 13 | (2) |
| 1999 | Bylis | | |
| 1999–2000 | Posušje | | |
| 2000–2002 | Vllaznia | 35 | (4) |
| 2002–2005 | Tirana | 83 | (14) |
| 2005–2006 | Vllaznia | 6 | (2) |
| 2005–2007 | Tirana | 31 | (1) |
| 2006–2007 | Elbasani | 9 | (1) |
| 2007–2008 | Shkumbini | 9 | (0) |
| 2009 | Tirana | 17 | (0) |
| 2010 | Kamza | 3 | (1) |

International career
| 1993 | Albania U-17 | 1 | (0) |
- * Club domestic league appearances and goals as of 19 May 2010

Sajmir Patushi (born 28 September 1976) is an Albanian retired football player. The left midfielder last played for FC Kamza.

== Club career ==
In 2009 he signed a one-year contract with Tirana.
