= 2006 Albanian Supercup =

- Event: Albanian Supercup
KF Tirana	KS Elbasani
2	0
- Date: August 19, 2006
- Venue: Niko Dovana Stadium, Durrës
- Referee: Tanush Latifi
- Attendance: 2,100

The 2006 Albanian Supercup is the 13th edition of the Albanian Supercup since its establishment in 1989. The match was contested between the Albanian Cup 2006 winners KF Tirana and the 2005–06 Albanian Superliga champions KS Elbasani.

Tirana won 2–0.

== Details ==
19 August 2006

KF Elbasani	0–2	KF Tirana
		Salihi 24'; Mukaj 60'

Niko Dovana Stadium, Durrës
Attendance: 2,100
Referee: Tanush Latifi
