= 1994 Albanian Supercup =

- Event: Albanian Supercup
KF Tirana	Teuta
1	0
- Date: 19 April 1995
- Venue: Qemal Stafa Stadium, Tirana
- Referee: Ylvi Kollari
- Attendance: 5,200

The 1994 Albanian Supercup was the fifth edition of the Albanian Supercup since its establishment in 1989. The match was contested between the Albanian Cup 1994 winners KF Tirana and the 1993–94 Albanian Superliga champions Teuta. The only goal of the match, by Sokol Prenga early in the first half, handed Tirana a 1–0 victory.

== Match details ==
19 April 1995
16:00 CET

KF Tirana	1–0	KS Teuta
Prenga 14' (pen.)

Qemal Stafa Stadium, Tirana
Attendance: 5,200
Referee: Ylvi Kollari

== See also ==
- 1993–94 Albanian Superliga
- 1993–94 Albanian Cup
