= Klodian Asllani =

Albanian retired football player

Personal information
- Full name: Klodian Asllani
- Date of birth: 2 August 1977 (age 49)
- Place of birth: Qyteti Stalin, Albania
- Position: Forward

Senior career*
Years	Team	Apps	(Gls)
2001	Tomori		
2002	Dinamo Tirana		
2002–2004	Vllaznia		
2004–2005	Elbasani	2	(0)
2005–2007	Dinamo Tirana	24	(3)
2007–2008	Kastrioti	22	(3)
2008–2009	Apolonia	24	(3)
2009–2010	Partizani	12	(2)
2010–2011	Skënderbeu	20	(2)
2011–2012	Dinamo Tirana	7	(0)
- * Club domestic league appearances and goals as of 19 May 2011 ‡ National team caps and goals as of 23 May 2009

Klodian Asllani (born 2 August 1977) is an Albanian retired football player.

== Club career ==
The striker had several spells with Dinamo Tirana in Albanian superliga.
