= 2000 Albanian Supercup =

- Event: Albanian Supercup
KF Tirana	KS Teuta
1	0
- Date: January 13, 2001
- Venue: Qemal Stafa Stadium, Tirana
- Referee: Bujar Pregja
- Attendance: 1,500

The 2000 Albanian Supercup is the seventh edition of the Albanian Supercup since its establishment in 1989. The match was contested between the Albanian Cup 2000 winners KS Teuta and the 1999–2000 Albanian Superliga champions KF Tirana.

== Match details ==
13 January 2001
17:00 CET

KF Tirana	1–0	KS Teuta
Fortuzi 54'

Qemal Stafa Stadium, Tirana
Attendance: 1,500
Referee: Bujar Pregja

== See also ==
- 1999–2000 Albanian Superliga
- 1999–2000 Albanian Cup
