= 1993–94 Albanian Cup =

Kupa e Shqipërisë

Tournament details
- Country: Albania

Final positions
- Champions: Tirana
- Runners-up: Teuta

1993–94 Albanian Cup (Albanian: Kupa e Shqipërisë) was the forty-second season of Albania's annual cup competition. It began in August 1993 with the First Round and ended in May 1994 with the final matches. The winners of the competition qualified for the 1994-95 first qualifying round of the UEFA Cup. Partizani were the defending champions, having won their fourteenth Albanian Cup last season. The cup was won by Tirana.

The first rounds were played in a two-legged format similar to those of European competitions. If the aggregated score was tied after both games, the team with the higher number of away goals advanced. If the number of away goals was equal in both games, the match was decided by extra time and a penalty shootout, if necessary. The quarter finals though were played in two groups with double round robin schedule each. The top 2 teams in each groups moved on to the next round of the competition.

== First round ==
Games were played on August & September 1993*

- Results unknown

== Second round ==
All sixteen teams of the 1992–93 Superliga and First Division entered in this round. Matches were played in four groups with one round robin schedule each. The top 2 teams in each groups moved on to the next round of the competition.

=== Group 1 ===
Pos	Team	Pld	W	D	L	GF	GA	GD	Pts	Qualification	PAR	BSL	ALB	LUS	SKË
1	Partizani	4	3	1	0	8	4	+4	10	Advance to quarter-finals	—	—	3–2	1–0	—
2	Besëlidhja	4	2	2	0	6	4	+2	8	Advance to quarter-finals	1–1	—	—	—	2–1
3	Albpetrol	4	1	1	2	8	7	+1	4		—	2–2	—	—	4–0
4	Lushnja	4	1	0	3	3	4	−1	3		—	0–1	2–0	—	—
5	Skënderbeu	4	1	0	3	4	10	−6	3		1–3	—	—	2–1	—

Source: Calciomondialeweb.it
Rules for classification: 1) points; 2) goal difference; 3) number of goals scored.

=== Group 2 ===
Pos	Team	Pld	W	D	L	GF	GA	GD	Pts	Qualification	TEU	LAÇ	SHQ	APO	TOM
1	Teuta	4	3	1	0	11	0	+11	10	Advance to quarter-finals	—	4–0	—	6–0	—
2	Laçi	4	2	0	2	10	8	+2	6	Advance to quarter-finals	—	—	2–0	—	6–1
3	Shqiponja	4	1	2	1	3	4	−1	5		0–0	—	—	1–0	—
4	Apolonia	4	2	0	2	5	9	−4	6		—	3–2	—	—	2–0
5	Tomori	4	0	1	3	3	11	−8	1		0–1	—	2–2	—	—

Source: Calciomondialeweb.it
Rules for classification: 1) points; 2) goal difference; 3) number of goals scored.

=== Group 3 ===
Pos	Team	Pld	W	D	L	GF	GA	GD	Pts	Qualification	TIR	DIN	BES	KAS	KUK
1	Tirana	4	4	0	0	19	2	+17	12	Advance to quarter-finals	—	—	—	10–0	2–0 (Note: Match awarded.)
2	Dinamo Tirana	4	2	0	2	10	7	+3	6	Advance to quarter-finals	1–4	—	—	7–1	—
3	Besa	4	1	0	3	6	9	−3	3		1–3	1–2	—	—	—
4	Kastrioti	4	0	0	4	3	22	−19	0		—	—	2–4	—	0–1
5	Kukësi (Note: Kukësi were demoted to bottom of the group for unsportsmanlike conduct.)	4	3	0	1	4	2	+2	9		—	1–0	2–0	—	—

Source: Calciomondialeweb.it
Rules for classification: 1) points; 2) goal difference; 3) number of goals scored.

=== Group 4 ===
Pos	Team	Pld	W	D	L	GF	GA	GD	Pts	Qualification	ELB	VLL	SOP	FLA	BYL
1	Elbasani	4	3	1	0	5	1	+4	10	Advance to quarter-finals	—	—	1–0	2–0	—
2	Vllaznia	4	2	2	0	7	2	+5	8	Advance to quarter-finals	1–1	—	0–0	—	—
3	Sopoti	4	2	1	1	4	1	+3	7		—	—	—	2–0	2–0 (Note: Match awarded.)
4	Flamurtari	4	1	0	3	4	7	−3	3		—	1–3	—	—	3–0
5	Bylis	4	0	0	4	0	9	−9	0		0–1	0–3	—	—	—

Source: Calciomondialeweb.it
Rules for classification: 1) points; 2) goal difference; 3) number of goals scored.

== Quarter-finals ==
In this round entered the 8 winners from the previous rounds. Matches were played in two groups with double round robin schedule each. The top 2 teams in each groups moved on to the next round of the competition.

=== Group 1 ===
Pos	Team	Pld	W	D	L	GF	GA	GD	Pts	Qualification	PAR	TEU	LAÇ	BEL
1	Partizani	6	2	4	0	8	4	+4	10	Advance to semi-finals	—	2–2	1–0	3–0
2	Teuta	6	2	3	1	8	6	+2	9	Advance to semi-finals	1–1	—	1–0	3–0
3	Laçi	6	2	1	3	5	7	−2	7		0–0	3–1	—	2–1
4	Besëlidhja	6	1	2	3	5	9	−4	5		1–1	0–0	3–0	—

Source: Calciomondialeweb.it
Rules for classification: 1) points; 2) goal difference; 3) number of goals scored.

=== Group 2 ===
Pos	Team	Pld	W	D	L	GF	GA	GD	Pts	Qualification	DIN	TIR	VLL	ELB
1	Dinamo Tirana	6	4	0	2	5	8	−3	12	Advance to semi-finals	—	2–1	0–5	1–0
2	Tirana	6	2	2	2	13	5	+8	8	Advance to semi-finals	0–1	—	1–1	3–0
3	Vllaznia	6	2	2	2	8	4	+4	8		0–1	0–0	—	2–1
4	Elbasani	6	2	0	4	5	14	−9	6		2–0	1–8	1–0	—

Source: Calciomondialeweb.it
Rules for classification: 1) points; 2) goal difference; 3) number of goals scored.

== Semi-finals ==
In this round entered the four winners from the previous round.

Team 1	Agg.	Team 2	1st leg	2nd leg
Tirana	1–0	Partizani	0–0	1–0
Teuta	2–0	Dinamo Tirana	0–0	2–0

== Finals ==
Team 1	Agg.	Team 2	1st leg	2nd leg
Teuta	0–1	Tirana	0–0	0–1

=== First leg ===
21 May 1994

Teuta	0–0	Tirana

Niko Dovana Stadium, Durrës

=== Second leg ===
28 May 1994

Tirana	1–0	Teuta
Malko 53'

Qemal Stafa Stadium, Tirana
