= 2003 Albanian Supercup =

- Event: Albanian Supercup
KF Tirana	Dinamo Tirana
3	0
- Date: August 16, 2003
- Venue: Qemal Stafa Stadium, Tirana
- Referee: Albano Janku

The 2003 Albanian Supercup is the tenth edition of the Albanian Supercup since its establishment in 1989. The match was contested between the Albanian Cup 2003 winners Dinamo Tirana and the 2002–03 Albanian Superliga champions KF Tirana. The match took place on 16 July 2003, with KF Tirana winning 3-nil.

== Match details ==
16 August 2003
19:00 CET

KF Tirana	3–0	Dinamo Tirana
Elvis Sina 29'; Mahir Halili 70'; Ansi Agolli 89'

Qemal Stafa Stadium, Tirana
Referee: Albano Janku

== See also ==
- 2002–03 Albanian Superliga
- 2002–03 Albanian Cup
