= KF Erzeni =

Albanian football club

Erzeni
- Full name: Klubi i Futbollit Erzeni
- Founded: 14 June 1931; 95 years ago
- Ground: Tofik Jashari Stadium
- Capacity: 4,000
- President: Elton Arbana
- Manager: Ilir Pula
- League: Kategoria e Dytë, Group A
- 2025–26: Kategoria e Dytë, Group A, 4th
Home colours	Away colours

Klubi i Futbollit Erzeni is an Albanian football club based in Shijak. They currently compete in the Kategoria e Dytë, which is the third tier of Albanian football, and they play their home games at the Tefik Jashari Stadium.

== History ==
Founded in 1931, Erzeni had three seasons in the Kategoria Superiore, the top tier of the Albanian football pyramid, between 2000 and 2003. Erzeni was always top of second league, but comunism didn’t know them as winners because of Shijak was part of Durres and they were not allowed in Superliga

=== Return to Kategoria Superiore ===
The club was promoted back to the top tier of Albanian Football after finishing as runners-up in the 2021–22 Kategoria e Parë, behind winners Bylis.

== Players ==
=== Current squad ===
As of 20 September 2026

Note: Flags indicate national team as defined under FIFA eligibility rules; some limited exceptions apply. Players may hold more than one non-FIFA nationality.

No.	Pos.	Nation	Player
1	GK	ALB	Renato Toromani
3	DF	ALB	Elvis Gjoni
4	DF	ALB	Juljan Tota
5	DF	COL	Davison Madrid Betancur
6	DF	ALB	Erigels Shkira
7	DF	ALB	Kevin Jata
8	DF	ALB	Elio Nderjaku
9	FW	ALB	Spartak Ajazi
10	MF	ALB	Enea Saliu
11	FW	ALB	Redi Veriu

No.	Pos.	Nation	Player
12	GK	ALB	Rajan Guçi
13	MF	ALB	Besurim Hafuzi
14	DF	ALB	Drilon Doci
15	MF	NGR	Gift Enefiok Okon
16	MF	NGR	Rapheal Olawole
17	FW	ALB	Aldo Mema
18	FW	ALB	Gëzim Velaj
19	MF	ALB	Kristjan Lleshaj
21	FW	ALB	Ledion Xhetani
24	FW	ALB	Orsi Ageja
25	FW	ALB	Murselo Dervishi

=== Notable former players ===
This is a list of Erzeni players with senior national team appearances

1. (Albania) Shyqyri Rreli (1948)
2. (Albania) Sabri Peqini (1946–1950)
3. (Albania) Agim Murati
4. (Albania) Artan Mërgjyshi (2001–2002)
5. (Albania) Ferdinand Bilali (2001–2002)
6. (Albania) Xhevahir Kapllani (2001–2003)
7. (Albania) Erion Xhafa (2002–2004)
8. (Zimbabwe) Noel Kaseke (2002–2003)
9. (Albania) Renato Arapi (2003–2004)
10. (Albania) Mario Dajsinani (2018)
11. (Albania) Isli Hidi (2021–2022)
12. (Albania) Fatbardh Deliallisi
13. (Albania) Agim Zeka
14. (Chameria) Marko Çema

== List of managers ==
- (Albania) Agim Murati
- (Albania) Saimir Dauti (2000–2001)
- (Italy) Tiziano Gori (2001)
- (Albania) Xhokhi Puka (2001–2002)
- (Montenegro) Derviš Hadžiosmanović (2002)
- (Albania) Petrit Haxhia (2003)
- (Montenegro) Derviš Hadžiosmanović (2004–2005)
- (Albania) Stavri Nica (August 2015 — December 2015)
- (Albania) Albert Boxhani (February 2016 — May 2016)
- (Albania) Dorjan Bubeqi (October 2016 — July 2017)
- (Albania) Sabri Kalleshi (July 2017 – ????)
- (Albania) Dorjan Bubeqi ( — January 2018)
- (Albania) Nevil Dede (10 January 2018 — 23 January 2018)
- (Albania) Gentian Stojku (2018 — February 2019)
- (Albania) Gentian Begeja (February 2019 — September 2019)
- (Albania) Vladimir Gjoni (October 2019 — December 2019)
- (Albania) Stavri Nica (Jan 2020 — Feb 2020)
- (Albania) Dorjan Bubeqi (Feb 2020– Jun 2021)
- (Albania) Nevil Dede (28 June 2021 — 1 July 2022)
- (Albania) Xhevahir Kapllani (1 July 2022 — 17 May 2023)
- (Albania) Alfred Deliallisi (19 May 2023 — 6 February 2024)
- (Albania) Skerdi Bejzade (7 February 2024 — 4 March 2024)
- (Albania) Alfred Deliallisi (5 March 2024 — 1 June 2024)
- (Albania) Justin Bespalla (8 August 2024 — 29 Sept 2024)
- (Albania) Ismail Çira (2 October 2024 — 11 October 2024)
- (Albania) Ergys Luga (12 Oct 2024 — 18 Mar 2025)
- (Albania) Arlind Nerjaku (19 Mar 2025 — 26 Mar 2025)
- (Albania) Ilir Pula (27 Mar 2025 — 30 Jun 2025)
- (Albania) Alert Alcani (1 Jul 2025 — December 2025)
- (Albania) Ismail Çira (February 2026 — April 2026)
- (Albania) Ilir Pula (26 August 2026 — )
