= 1996–97 Albanian National Championship =

Albanian National Championship
- Season: 1996–97
- Champions: Tirana; 17th Albanian title
- Relegated: None
- Champions League: None
- UEFA Cup: None
- Cup Winners' Cup: None
- Matches: 193
- Goals: 441 (2.28 per match)
- Top goalscorer: Viktor Paço (14 goals)

The 1996–97 Albanian National Championship was the 58th season of the Albanian National Championship, the top professional league for association football clubs, since its establishment in 1930.

The championship was interrupted after 17th round due to the economic-political crisis in Albania in 1997 and was completed in August. Instead the regular second half, the final play-off phase was played, with the 18 teams were divided into 3 groups of 6 according to standings after the 17 rounds.

== Teams ==
=== Stadia and last season ===
Locations of the 1996–97 Albanian National Championship teams

| Team | Location | Stadium | Capacity | Last season |
|---|---|---|---|---|
| Albpetrol | Patos | Alush Noga Stadium | 2,150 | 11th |
| Apolonia | Fier | Loni Papuçiu Stadium | 10,000 | 6th |
| Besa | Kavajë | Besa Stadium | 8,000 | 7th |
| Bylis | Ballsh | Adush Muça Stadium | 6,000 | Kategoria e Dytë |
| Elbasani | Elbasan | Ruzhdi Bizhuta Stadium | 15,000 | 13th |
| Flamurtari | Vlorë | Flamurtari Stadium | 15,000 | 4th |
| Laçi | Laç | Laçi Stadium | 5,000 | 12th |
| Lushnja | Lushnjë | Abdurrahman Roza Haxhiu Stadium | 12,000 | Kategoria e Dytë |
| Olimpik | Tirana | Qemal Stafa Stadium (Note: Olimpik, Partizani and Tirana all shared the Qemal Stafa Stadium as well as the Selman Stërmasi Stadium.) | 19,700 | 5th |
| Partizani | Tirana | Qemal Stafa Stadium | 19,700 | 3rd |
| Skënderbeu | Korçë | Skënderbeu Stadium | 12,000 | 16th |
| Sopoti (Note: Sopoti was played under the name Albania Tabak during the regular season.) | Librazhd | Sopoti Stadium | 3,000 | 8th |
| Shkumbini | Peqin | Shkumbini Stadium | 6,000 | 9th |
| Shqiponja | Gjirokastër | Gjirokastër Stadium | 9,000 | 15th |
| Teuta | Durrës | Niko Dovana Stadium | 12,040 | 2nd |
| Tirana | Tirana | Qemal Stafa Stadium | 19,700 | Champions |
| Tomori | Berat | Tomori Stadium | 14,750 | 14th |
| Vllaznia | Shkodër | Loro Boriçi Stadium | 15,000 | 10th |

== Regular season ==
=== League table ===
| Pos | Team | Pld | W | D | L | GF | GA | GD | Pts | Qualification |
|---|---|---|---|---|---|---|---|---|---|---|
| 1 | Flamurtari | 17 | 12 | 1 | 4 | 34 | 16 | +18 | 37 | Qualification for Group 1 |
| 2 | Tirana | 17 | 10 | 4 | 3 | 34 | 8 | +26 | 34 | Qualification for Group 1 |
| 3 | Vllaznia | 17 | 11 | 0 | 6 | 24 | 16 | +8 | 33 | Qualification for Group 1 |
| 4 | Apolonia | 17 | 9 | 4 | 4 | 22 | 15 | +7 | 31 | Qualification for Group 1 |
| 5 | Partizani | 17 | 9 | 4 | 4 | 19 | 15 | +4 | 31 | Qualification for Group 1 |
| 6 | Shkumbini | 17 | 8 | 2 | 7 | 17 | 17 | 0 | 26 | Qualification for Group 1 |
| 7 | Laçi | 17 | 7 | 4 | 6 | 19 | 19 | 0 | 25 | Qualification for Group 2 |
| 8 | Lushnja | 17 | 6 | 6 | 5 | 18 | 14 | +4 | 24 | Qualification for Group 2 |
| 9 | Bylis | 17 | 6 | 4 | 7 | 18 | 16 | +2 | 22 | Qualification for Group 3 (Note: Bylis were placed in Group 3 for unknown reasons. Tomori were placed instead in Group 2.) |
| 10 | Besa | 17 | 6 | 4 | 7 | 15 | 14 | +1 | 22 | Qualification for Group 2 |
| 11 | Teuta | 17 | 6 | 3 | 8 | 14 | 13 | +1 | 21 | Qualification for Group 2 |
| 12 | Albania Tabak (Note: Albania Tabak were changed name back to Sopoti during the interruption.) | 17 | 7 | 0 | 10 | 11 | 19 | −8 | 21 | Qualification for Group 2 |
| 13 | Tomori | 17 | 5 | 5 | 7 | 10 | 18 | −8 | 20 | Qualification for Group 2 |
| 14 | Elbasani | 17 | 6 | 2 | 9 | 16 | 25 | −9 | 20 | Qualification for Group 3 |
| 15 | Shqiponja | 17 | 5 | 4 | 8 | 13 | 20 | −7 | 19 | Qualification for Group 3 |
| 16 | Olimpik | 17 | 5 | 1 | 11 | 21 | 24 | −3 | 16 | Qualification for Group 3 |
| 17 | Albpetrol | 17 | 4 | 4 | 9 | 12 | 27 | −15 | 16 | Qualification for Group 3 |
| 18 | Skënderbeu | 17 | 4 | 2 | 11 | 12 | 33 | −21 | 14 | Qualification for Group 3 |

Source: RSSSF.org
Rules for classification: 1) Points; 2) Head-to-head points; 3) Head-to-head goal difference; 4) Head-to-head goals scored; 5) Goal difference; 6) Goals scored; 7) Draw.

=== Results ===
| Home \ Away | ATA | ALB | APO | BES | BYL | ELB | FLA | LAÇ | LUS | OLI | PAR | SKË | SKU | SHQ | TEU | TIR | TOM | VLL |
|---|---|---|---|---|---|---|---|---|---|---|---|---|---|---|---|---|---|---|
| Albania Tabak | | | | | | | 0–1 | 1–0 | 2–0 | 1–0 | 0–1 | | | 2–0 | 0–1 | | | 2–0 |
| Albpetrol | 1–2 | | | 1–0 | 1–1 | | | 1–1 | | 1–3 | | | | 1–1 | | 0–2 (Note: Match awarded.) | 1–0 | 2–1 |
| Apolonia | 1–0 | 4–0 | | | 1–0 | 1–1 | | 1–1 | | 1–0 | | | | 1–0 | 2–1 | | | 2–0 |
| Besa | 1–0 | | 1–2 | | | 3–1 | | 1–0 | 1–1 | | | 4–0 | 1–1 | | | 2–0 | | |
| Bylis | 0–1 | | | 4–0 | | 1–0 | | | | 2–1 | | 4–0 | 1–0 | | 0–0 | | 1–0 | 1–2 |
| Elbasani | 3–0 | 1–0 | | | | | 3–2 | | | | 1–2 | 0–1 | 2–0 | | 1–0 | | 0–0 | |
| Flamurtari | | 3–0 | 3–1 | 1–0 | 2–1 | | | | | | | 3–0 | 3–0 | 3–2 | 3–1 | 1–0 | | |
| Laçi | | | | | 1–0 | 4–1 | 2–1 | | 2–2 | 3–1 | | 2–1 | | 2–0 | | 0–0 | 1–0 | |
| Lushnja | | 3–0 | 2–2 | | 2–1 | 0–1 | 1–2 | | | | | 2–0 | | | | | 2–0 | 1–0 |
| Olimpik | | | | 0–1 | | 5–1 | 1–4 | | 0–1 | | 1–1 | | 3–0 | | 2–0 | 0–3 | | 1–2 |
| Partizani | | 2–0 | 2–1 | 1–0 | 0–0 | | 2–1 | 3–0 | 1–0 | | | 2–0 | | | | | | |
| Skënderbeu | 2–0 | 1–1 | 0–2 | | | | | | | 1–3 | | | | 2–1 | 2–1 | 0–3 | 1–1 | |
| Shkumbini | 3–0 | 2–1 | 2–0 | | | | | 1–0 | 0–0 | | 4–0 | 1–0 | | | 1–0 | | | 1–0 |
| Shqiponja | | | | 0–0 | 1–1 | 1–0 | | | 1–0 | 1–0 | 0–0 | | 1–0 | | | | 3–0 | |
| Teuta | | 0–1 | | 1–0 | | | | 4–0 | 0–0 | | 1–0 | | | 2–0 | | 0–0 | | 2–0 |
| Tirana | 3–0 | | 2–0 | | 4–0 | 4–0 | | | 1–1 | | 1–1 | | 3–1 | 4–0 | | | 4–0 | |
| Tomori | 2–0 | | 0–0 | 0–0 | | | 0–0 | | | 1–0 | 2–1 | | 2–0 | | 1–0 | | | |
| Vllaznia | | | | 1–0 | | 1–0 | 2–1 | 1–0 | | | 3–0 | 3–1 | | 2–1 | | 2–0 | 4–1 | |

Source: RSSSF.org
Legend: Blue = home team win; Yellow = draw; Red = away team win.

== Final phase ==
=== Group 1 ===
Played in Tirana.

| Pos | Team | Pld | W | D | L | GF | GA | GD | Pts |
|---|---|---|---|---|---|---|---|---|---|
| 1 | Tirana (C) | 22 | 14 | 4 | 4 | 40 | 9 | +31 | 46 |
| 2 | Vllaznia | 22 | 14 | 1 | 7 | 30 | 20 | +10 | 43 |
| 3 | Flamurtari (Note: Flamurtari were deducted four points for the crowd trouble in the last round.) | 22 | 14 | 3 | 5 | 42 | 23 | +19 | 41 |
| 4 | Partizani | 22 | 12 | 4 | 6 | 28 | 20 | +8 | 40 |
| 5 | Apolonia | 22 | 9 | 4 | 9 | 25 | 26 | −1 | 31 |
| 6 | Shkumbini | 22 | 9 | 3 | 10 | 23 | 27 | −4 | 30 |

Source: RSSSF.org
Rules for classification: 1) Points; 2) Head-to-head points; 3) Head-to-head goal difference; 4) Head-to-head goals scored; 5) Goal difference; 6) Goals scored; 7) Draw.
(C) Champions

==== Results ====
| Home \ Away | APO | FLA | PAR | SKU | TIR | VLL |
|---|---|---|---|---|---|---|
| Apolonia | | 2–3 | 0–4 | 1–2 | 0–1 | 0–1 |
| Flamurtari | | | 2–0 | 2–2 | 0–2 (Note: Match awarded.) | 1–1 |
| Partizani | | | | 3–1 | 0–1 | 2–1 |
| Shkumbini | | | | | 0–2 | 1–2 |
| Tirana | | | | | | 0–1 |
| Vllaznia | | | | | | |

Source: RSSSF.org

=== Group 2 ===
Played in Kavajë and Durrës.

| Pos | Team | Pld | W | D | L | GF | GA | GD | Pts |
|---|---|---|---|---|---|---|---|---|---|
| 7 | Lushnja | 22 | 10 | 6 | 6 | 32 | 20 | +12 | 36 |
| 8 | Teuta | 22 | 10 | 3 | 9 | 23 | 16 | +7 | 33 |
| 9 | Sopoti | 22 | 10 | 1 | 11 | 17 | 23 | −6 | 31 |
| 10 | Laçi | 22 | 7 | 6 | 9 | 22 | 29 | −7 | 27 |
| 11 | Besa | 22 | 7 | 4 | 11 | 18 | 21 | −3 | 25 |
| 12 | Tomori | 22 | 6 | 6 | 10 | 15 | 28 | −13 | 24 |

Source: RSSSF.org
Rules for classification: 1) Points; 2) Head-to-head points; 3) Head-to-head goal difference; 4) Head-to-head goals scored; 5) Goal difference; 6) Goals scored; 7) Draw.

==== Results ====
| Home \ Away | BES | LAÇ | LUS | SOP | TEU | TOM |
|---|---|---|---|---|---|---|
| Besa | | 1–0 | 1–2 | 1–2 | 0–2 | 0–1 |
| Laçi | | | 1–4 | 1–1 | 0–3 | 1–1 |
| Lushnja | | | | 2–0 | 1–2 | 5–2 |
| Sopoti | | | | | 1–0 | 2–0 |
| Teuta | | | | | | 2–1 |
| Tomori | | | | | | |

Source: RSSSF.org

=== Group 3 ===
Played in Elbasan.

| Pos | Team | Pld | W | D | L | GF | GA | GD | Pts |
|---|---|---|---|---|---|---|---|---|---|
| 13 | Elbasani | 21 | 9 | 2 | 10 | 27 | 28 | −1 | 29 |
| 14 | Bylis | 21 | 7 | 4 | 10 | 23 | 26 | −3 | 25 |
| 15 | Skënderbeu | 21 | 7 | 3 | 11 | 21 | 38 | −17 | 24 |
| 16 | Olimpik | 21 | 7 | 2 | 12 | 27 | 28 | −1 | 23 |
| 17 | Albpetrol | 21 | 4 | 4 | 13 | 15 | 39 | −24 | 16 |
| 18 | Shqiponja (Note: Shqiponja were withdrew before start of the final phase.) | 17 | 5 | 4 | 8 | 13 | 20 | −7 | 19 |

Source: RSSSF.org
Rules for classification: 1) Points; 2) Head-to-head points; 3) Head-to-head goal difference; 4) Head-to-head goals scored; 5) Goal difference; 6) Goals scored; 7) Draw.

==== Results ====
| Home \ Away | ALB | BYL | ELB | OLI | SKË |
|---|---|---|---|---|---|
| Albpetrol | | 2–3 | 0–3 | 0–3 | 1–3 |
| Bylis | | | 1–5 | 0–1 | 1–2 |
| Elbasani | | | | 2–0 | 1–2 |
| Olimpik | | | | | 2–2 |
| Skënderbeu | | | | | |

Source: RSSSF.org

== Season statistics ==
=== Top scorers ===
| Rank | Player | Club | Goals |
|---|---|---|---|
| 1 | (Albania) Viktor Paço | Flamurtari | 14 |
| 2 | (Albania) Edi Martini | Vllaznia | 9 |
| 2 | (Albania) Alket Zeqo | Apolonia | 9 |
| 2 | (Albania) Agron Xhafa | Olimpik | 9 |
| 2 | (Albania) Alban Bushi | Tirana/Flamurtari | 9 |
| 6 | (Albania) Indrit Fortuzi | Tirana | 8 |
| 7 | (Albania) Erion Bogdani | Partizani | 7 |
| 7 | (Albania) Gugash Magani | Shkumbini | 7 |
| 9 | (Albania) Shpëtim Kushta | Flamurtari | 6 |
| 9 | (Albania) Saimir Maloku | Laçi | 6 |
