= Albanian Supercup =

Superkupa e Shqipërisë
- Organiser(s): Albanian Football Federation (FSHF)
- Founded: 1989; 37 years ago
- Region: Albania
- Teams: 2
- Related competitions: Kategoria Superiore (qualifier); Albanian Cup (qualifier)
- Current champions: Dinamo City (3rd title)
- Most championships: Tirana (12 titles)

The Albanian Supercup (Albanian: Superkupa e Shqipërisë) is an annually held match between the champions of the Kategoria Superiore and the Albanian Cup winners, or, if the same team won both trophies, the Cup's runners-up.

Prior to 2000, the Supercup final was not played if the champion team had won the Double. However, after 2000, the Albanian Football Federation changed the rule, and the final has since been played against the Cup runners-up in such a scenario.

There have been 30 finals played in total. Tirana are the most successful team, having won the trophy 12 times.

== Results of the finals ==
| Season | Date | Winners | Score | Runners-up |
|---|---|---|---|---|
| 1989 | 11 January 1990 | Dinamo Tirana | 2–0 | Tirana |
| 1990 | 11 January 1991 | Flamurtari | 3–3 (aet) 5–4 (p) | Dinamo Tirana |
| 1991 | 11 January 1992 | Flamurtari | 1–0 | Partizani |
| 1992 | 10 January 1993 | Elbasani | 3–2 (aet) | Vllaznia |
| 1993 | No Trophy Awarded because Partizani won the Double. | | | |
| 1994 | 8 January 1995 | Tirana | 1–0 | Teuta |
| 1995 | Final involving Tirana and Teuta was not played. | | | |
| 1996 | No Trophy Awarded because Tirana won the Double. | | | |
| 1997 | Final involving Tirana and Partizani was not played. | | | |
| 1998 | 9 January 1999 | Vllaznia | 1–1 (aet) 5–4 (p) | Apolonia |
| 1999 | No Trophy Awarded because Tirana won the Double. | | | |
| 2000 | 13 January 2001 | Tirana | 1–0 | Teuta |
| 2001 | 15 September 2001 | Vllaznia | 2–1 | Tirana |
| 2002 | 14 September 2002 | Tirana | 6–0 | Dinamo Tirana |
| 2003 | 16 August 2003 | Tirana | 3–0 | Dinamo Tirana |
| 2004 | 17 August 2004 | Partizani | 2–0 | Tirana |
| 2005 | 21 August 2005 | Tirana | 0–0 (aet) 5–4 (p) | Teuta |
| 2006 | 19 August 2006 | Tirana | 2–0 | Elbasani |
| 2007 | 23 August 2007 | Tirana | 4–2 | Besa |
| 2008 | 24 August 2008 | Dinamo Tirana | 2–0 | Vllaznia |
| 2009 | 16 August 2009 | Tirana | 1–0 | Flamurtari |
| 2010 | 16 August 2010 | Besa | 3–1 | Dinamo Tirana |
| 2011 | 18 August 2011 | Tirana | 1–0 | Skënderbeu |
| 2012 | 19 August 2012 | Tirana | 2–1 | Skënderbeu |
| 2013 | 18 August 2013 | Skënderbeu | 1–1 (aet) 4–3 (p) | Laçi |
| 2014 | 17 August 2014 | Skënderbeu | 1–0 | Flamurtari |
| 2015 | 12 August 2015 | Laçi | 2–2 (aet) 8–7 (p) | Skënderbeu |
| 2016 | 25 August 2016 | Kukësi | 3–1 | Skënderbeu |
| 2017 | 6 September 2017 | Tirana | 1–0 | Kukësi |
| 2018 | 12 August 2018 | Skënderbeu | 3–2 | Laçi |
| 2019 | 18 August 2019 | Partizani | 4–2 (a.e.t.) | Kukësi |
| 2020 | 31 August 2020 | Teuta | 2–1 | Tirana |
| 2021 | 28 August 2021 | Teuta | 3–0 | Vllaznia |
| 2022 | 7 December 2022 | Tirana | 3–2 | Vllaznia |
| 2023 | 20 December 2023 | Partizani | 1–0 | Egnatia |
| 2024 | 26 December 2024 | Egnatia | 2–0 | Kukësi |
| 2025 | 28 December 2025 | Dinamo City | 3–1 | Egnatia |

== Performances ==
=== Performance by club ===
| Club | Winners | Runners-up | Winning years | Runners-up years |
|---|---|---|---|---|
| Tirana | 12 | 4 | 1994, 2000, 2002, 2003, 2005, 2006, 2007, 2009, 2011, 2012, 2017, 2022 | 1989, 2001, 2004, 2020 |
| Dinamo City | 3 | 4 | 1989, 2008, 2025 | 1990, 2002, 2003, 2010 |
| Skënderbeu | 3 | 4 | 2013, 2014, 2018 | 2011, 2012, 2015, 2016 |
| Partizani | 3 | 1 | 2004, 2019, 2023 | 1991 |
| Vllaznia | 2 | 4 | 1998, 2001 | 1992, 2008, 2021, 2022 |
| Teuta | 2 | 3 | 2020, 2021 | 1994, 2000, 2005 |
| Flamurtari | 2 | 2 | 1990, 1991 | 2009, 2014 |
| Kukësi | 1 | 3 | 2016 | 2017, 2019, 2024 |
| Egnatia | 1 | 2 | 2024 | 2023, 2025 |
| Laçi | 1 | 2 | 2015 | 2013, 2018 |
| Elbasani | 1 | 1 | 1992 | 2006 |
| Besa | 1 | 1 | 2010 | 2007 |
| Apolonia | — | 1 | — | 1998 |

== Records ==
Most wins: 12

- Tirana (1994, 2000, 2002, 2003, 2005, 2006, 2007, 2009, 2011, 2012, 2017, 2022)

Most finals: 16

- Tirana (1989, 1994, 2000, 2001, 2002, 2003, 2004, 2005, 2006, 2007, 2009, 2011, 2012, 2017, 2020, 2022)

Most consecutive wins: 3

- Tirana (2005, 2006, 2007)

Most consecutive appearances: 8

- Tirana (2000, 2001, 2002, 2003, 2004, 2005, 2006, 2007)

Biggest win:

- Tirana 6–0 Dinamo Tirana (2002)
