= 2003–04 KF Tirana season =

Tirana
2003–04 season
- President: Metwally El Sayed
- Head coach: Sulejman Mema (until 25 October 2003); Mirel Josa
- Stadium: Qemal Stafa Stadium; Selman Stërmasi Stadium
- Kategoria Superiore: Winners
- Albanian Cup: Semi–finals
- Albanian Supercup: Winners
- Champions League: 2nd Qualifying Round
- Top goalscorer: League: Indrit Fortuzi (20); All: Indrit Fortuzi (23)
Home colours	Away colours

The 2003–04 season was Klubi i Futbollit Tirana's 65th competitive season, 65th consecutive season in the Kategoria Superiore and 83rd year in existence as a football club.

== Season overview ==
Tirana started its 65th competitive season in mid-July, where was going to face the Georgian side Dinamo Tbilisi for the first qualifying round of 2003–04 UEFA Champions League. In the first leg on 16 July 2003, Tirana almost lose the hopes when was beaten 3–0 at Boris Paichadze Dinamo Arena. In the returning leg at Qemal Stafa Stadium nine days later, Tirana would perform one of the best come-backs in Champions League history by beating Dinamo Tbilisi 3–0 in the regular time. Extra time ended in the same level, but Tirana managed to complete the come-back by eliminating them via penalty shootout. In the second qualifying round, Tirana was easily defeated by Austrian side GAK, who eliminated the capital side with the aggregate 7–2. Tirana lost the first match at home 1–5 and then the second at Sportzentrum Weinzödl with the result 2–1.

Tirana won the first trophy of the season on 16 August where they beat the cross-town rivals Dinamo Tirana to grab their 4th Albanian Supercup title. Sina, Halili and Agolli sealed the victory with their goals. Tirana commenced their domestic campaign on 23 August with a 0–6 away win against Lushnja at neutral ground of Tomori Stadium, which was followed with a 0–3 away win against Flamurtari Vlorë. On 12 September, Tirana recorded its biggest win of the season by scoring 7–1 against Besa Kavajë at the Selman Stërmasi Stadium. The goals were scored by seven different players.

In the second round of 2003–04 Albanian Cup, Tirana easily managed to eliminate Turbina Cërrik with the aggregate 8–2. On 25 October, Sulejman Mema resigned as the coach of Tirana after ending the month with 2 loses and 2 draws, with Tirana falling down at 4th place. He was replaced by Mirel Josa, a former player who represented KF Tirana for ten years from 1980 to 1990. Josa started extremely well, collecting six consecutive win in the league during the second phrase, including a 1–0 win over the rivals Partizani Tirana. Also in November, Tirana beat Lushnja 3–0 on aggregate to go into the quarter-finals of Albanian Cup. On 20 December, Tirana defeated Dinamo 5–1 at home, a result which was followed by a 1–1 draw against Elbasani, with Tirana ending the first part of the season in the first place, with a considerable gap.

Tirana started 2004 with a 1–1 draw against Lushnja on 24 January. Six days later, Tirana gained its first win of the new year, defeating Flamurtari 0–2 in Vlorë. During this year, Tirana recorded six consecutive wins from 30 January to 13 March. On 19 March, in the match against Dinamo Tirana, Tirana was defeated for the time in 2004 with the result 3–0. Also in March, Tirana progressed in semi-finals of the Albanian Cup by beating Besa Kavajë in the quarter-final with the aggregate 5–2, winning both matches. In April, Tirana managed to win four out of four league matches, being closer to win the league title. Also during this month, Tirana was eliminated by Dinamo Tirana in semi-final of the cup, with Dinamo qualifying in the final with the aggregate 5–2, winning both matches.

In the final match of the season, Tirana returned in winning ways after four consecutive league matches without a win by defeating Elbasani 2–5 at Ruzhdi Bizhuta Stadium. Tirana ended the season in the first place with 80 points from 36 matches, being crowned the Albanian champions for the 22nd time in history. By winning the league, Tirana also qualified for the next season's UEFA Champions League.

== Squad ==
=== Squad information ===
As of 31 May 2004

Note: Flags indicate national team as defined under FIFA eligibility rules; some limited exceptions apply. Players may hold more than one non-FIFA nationality.

No.	Pos.	Nation	Player
1	GK	NGR	Ndubuisi Egbo
2	DF	ALB	Elvis Sina
3	DF	ALB	Rezart Dabulla
4	DF	ALB	Nevil Dede (captain)
7	DF	ALB	Alban Tafaj
8	MF	ALB	Ervin Bulku
9	MF	ALB	Sokol Bulku
10	MF	ALB	Devi Muka
11	FW	ALB	Indrit Fortuzi
12	GK	ALB	Isli Hidi
14	FW	ALB	Mahir Halili
15	DF	ALB	Ansi Agolli
16	DF	ALB	Gentian Hajdari

No.	Pos.	Nation	Player
17	FW	ALB	Sokol Prenga
19	MF	ALB	Suad Liçi
20	FW	ALB	Fjodor Xhafa
21	MF	ALB	Sajmir Patushi
23	MF	ALB	Eldorado Merkoçi
24	MF	ALB	Luan Pinari
—	GK	ALB	Lazi Gjika
—	DF	ALB	Alban Muça
—	DF	ALB	Elton Grami
—	DF	ALB	Ervin Fakaj
—	MF	ALB	Leonardo Vladi
—	MF	ALB	Armand Nebiu
—	MF	ALB	Florian Manastirliu

== Competitions ==
=== Albanian Supercup ===
Win Draw Loss

16 August 2003 Final	Tirana	3–0	Dinamo Tirana	Tirana
16:00 CET	Sina 29'; Halili 70'; Agolli 89'	Report		Stadium: Qemal Stafa Stadium; Referee: Albano Janku

=== Kategoria Superiore ===
==== League table ====
Pos	Team	Pld	W	D	L	GF	GA	GD	Pts	Qualification or relegation
1	Tirana (C)	36	24	8	4	90	36	+54	80	Qualification for the Champions League first qualifying round
2	Dinamo Tirana	36	21	8	7	68	39	+29	71	Qualification for the UEFA Cup first qualifying round
3	Vllaznia	36	21	5	10	77	51	+26	68	Qualification for the Intertoto Cup first round
4	Partizani	36	20	7	9	65	39	+26	67	Qualification for the UEFA Cup first qualifying round (Note: Partizani qualified for the UEFA Cup first qualifying round by winning the 2003–04 Albanian Cup.)
5	Teuta	36	14	10	12	57	49	+8	52	Qualification for the Intertoto Cup first round

Source: Albanian Football Association (in Albanian), RSSSF.org
Rules for classification: 1) points; 2) points in head-to-head matches; 3) goal difference in head-to-head matches; 4) goals scored in head-to-head matches; 5) total goal difference; 6) total goals scored; 7) draw
(C) Champions

==== Results summary ====
Overall								Home						Away					
Pld	W	D	L	GF	GA	GD	Pts	W	D	L	GF	GA	GD	W	D	L	GF	GA	GD
36	24	8	4	90	36	+54	80	14	3	1	54	16	+38	10	5	3	36	20	+16

Last updated: 16 November 2015.
Source: Competitive matches

==== Results by round ====
Round	1	2	3	4	5	6	7	8	9	10	11	12	13	14	15	16	17	18	19	20	21	22	23	24	25	26	27	28	29	30	31	32	33	34	35	36
Ground	A	A	H	A	H	A	H	A	H	H	H	A	H	A	H	A	H	A	A	A	H	A	H	A	H	A	A	H	H	A	H	A	H	A	H	A
Result	W	W	W	W	W	L	L	D	D	W	W	W	W	W	W	D	W	D	D	W	W	W	W	W	W	L	W	W	W	W	W	L	D	D	D	W
Position	1	1	1	1	1	1	2	3	4	3	2	1	1	1	1	1	1	1	1	1	1	1	1	1	1	1	1	1	1	1	1	1	1	1	1	1

Source: Competitive matches
A = Away; H = Home; W = Win; D = Draw; L = Loss

==== Matches ====
Win Draw Loss

23 August 2003 1	Lushnja	0–6	Tirana	Berat (Note: The match was held at Tomori Stadium due to reconstruction of Abdurrahman Roza Haxhiu Stadium.)
		Report	Halili 40', 61'; Fortuzi 63', 90'; Muka 65'; S. Bulku 85'	Stadium: Tomori Stadium

30 August 2003 2	Flamurtari Vlorë	0–3	Tirana	Vlorë
		Report	Muka 5'; Patushi 32'; Fortuzi 70'	Stadium: Flamurtari Stadium

12 September 2003 3	Tirana	7–1	Besa Kavajë	Tirana
	Sina 32'; Liçi 49'; Dabulla 51'; S. Bulku 58'; Fortuzi 73'; Xhafa 75'; Tafaj 90'	Report	Kuli 20'	Stadium: Selman Stërmasi Stadium

20 September 2003 4	Shkumbini Peqin	1–3	Tirana	Kuçovë
	Salliu 6'	Report	S. Bulku 60'; Muka 80'; Xhafa 90'	Stadium: Bashkim Sulejmani Stadium

26 September 2003 5	Tirana	3–2	Vllaznia Shkodër	Tirana
	Muka 8'; Hajdari 45+2'; Merkoçi 88'	Report	Osja 29'; Sinani (?)	Stadium: Selman Stërmasi Stadium

3 October 2003 6	Partizani Tirana	3–1	Tirana	Tirana
	Duro 23'; Muzaka 33'; Viana 67'	Report	Halili 1'	Stadium: Qemal Stafa Stadium

8 October 2003 7	Tirana	1–3	Teuta Durrës	Tirana
	Merkoçi 60'	Report	Mancaku 14' (pen.); Babamusta 35'; Halili 47' (o.g.)	Stadium: Selman Stërmasi Stadium

17 October 2003 8	Dinamo Tirana	0–0	Tirana	Tirana
		Report		Stadium: Qemal Stafa Stadium

25 October 2003 9	Tirana	0–0	Elbasani	Tirana
		Report		Stadium: Selman Stërmasi Stadium

1 November 2003 10	Tirana	2–1	Lushnja	Tirana
	Fortuzi 44'; Merkoçi 67'	Report	Mindev 58'	Stadium: Selman Stërmasi Stadium

7 November 2003 11	Tirana	2–1	Flamurtari Vlorë	Tirana
	Fortuzi 29'; Muka 39'	Report	Papa 90+2'	Stadium: Selman Stërmasi Stadium

19 November 2003 12	Besa Kavajë	1–2	Tirana	Kavajë
	Kapllani 6'	Report	Muka 27', 90'	Stadium: Besa Stadium

22 November 2003 13	Tirana	5–2	Shkumbini Peqin	Tirana
	Halili 45'; Fortuzi 54'; Prenga 65'; Muka 82' (pen.); Patushi 90+3'	Report	Pasha 12'; Dervishi 84' (pen.)	Stadium: Selman Stërmasi Stadium

29 November 2003 14	Vllaznia Shkodër	1–3	Tirana	Shkodër
	Salihi 40'	Report	Dabulla 11'; Liçi 71'; S. Bulku 90'	Stadium: Loro Boriçi Stadium

6 December 2003 15	Tirana	1–0	Partizani Tirana	Tirana
	Muka 53'	Report		Stadium: Qemal Stafa Stadium

13 December 2003 16	Teuta Durrës	0–0	Tirana	Durrës
		Report		Stadium: Niko Dovana Stadium

20 December 2003 17	Tirana	5–1	Dinamo Tirana	Tirana
	Fortuzi 14' (pen.); Muka 30' (pen.); Dabulla 32'; Xhafa 70', 72'	Report	Bakalli 60'	Stadium: Qemal Stafa Stadium

24 December 2003 18	Elbasani	1–1	Tirana	Elbasan
	Brahja 60'	Report	Sina 81'	Stadium: Ruzhdi Bizhuda Stadium

24 January 2004 19	Lushnja	1–1	Tirana	Kuçovë (Note: The match was held at Bashkim Sulejmani Stadium due to reconstruction of Abdurrahman Roza Haxhiu Stadium.)
	Arbëri 65'	Report	Fortuzi 15' (pen.)	Stadium: Tomori Stadium

30 January 2004 20	Flamurtari Vlorë	0–2	Tirana	Vlorë
		Report	Xhafa 29'; Fortuzi 68'	Stadium: Flamurtari Stadium

22 February 2004 21	Tirana	5–0	Besa Kavajë	Tirana
	Fortuzi 19'; Muka 28'; Patushi 74', 90+1'; Xhafa 83'	Report		Stadium: Selman Stërmasi Stadium

25 February 2004 22	Shkumbini Peqin	0–2	Tirana	Rrogozhinë (Note: The match was held at Rrogozhinë Stadium due to reconstruction of Shkumbini Stadium.)
		Report	Fortuzi 24'; Patushi 90+1'	Stadium: Rrogozhinë Stadium

28 February 2004 23	Tirana	5–1	Vllaznia Shkodër	Tirana
	Xhafa 3', 42'; Muka 31', 49'; Fortuzi 73'	Report	Sinani 81'	Stadium: Selman Stërmasi Stadium

6 March 2004 24	Partizani Tirana	0–1	Tirana	Tirana
		Report	Fortuzi 90+1'	Stadium: Qemal Stafa Stadium

13 March 2004 25	Tirana	3–0	Teuta Durrës	Tirana
	Fortuzi 26', 90+1'; Muka 88'	Report		Stadium: Selman Stërmasi Stadium

19 March 2004 26	Dinamo Tirana	3–0	Tirana	Tirana
	Qorri 17', 44'; Keita 67'	Report		Stadium: Qemal Stafa Stadium

27 March 2004 27	Tirana	3–0	Elbasani	Tirana
	Xhafa 5', 9'; Fortuzi 83'	Report		Stadium: Selman Stërmasi Stadium

3 April 2004 28	Tirana	3–0	Lushnja	Tirana
	Xhafa 33'; Fortuzi 65'; Sina 85'	Report		Stadium: Selman Stërmasi Stadium

10 April 2004 29	Tirana	5–1	Flamurtari Vlorë	Tirana
	Dine 42' (o.g.); Fortuzi 44', 50'; Muka 86'; Merkoçi 88'	Report	Skënderi 67'	Stadium: Selman Stërmasi Stadium

17 April 2004 30	Besa Kavajë	2–4	Tirana	Kavajë
	Bubeqi 15'; Bajaziti 90'	Report	Halili 32'; Sina 38'; Dede 60'; Xhafa 80'	Stadium: Besa Stadium

24 April 2004 31	Tirana	3–2	Shkumbini Peqin	Tirana
	Agolli 37'; E. Bulku 48'; Merkoçi 62'	Report	Dervishi 65' (pen.); Bylykbashi 90+2'	Stadium: Selman Stërmasi Stadium

1 May 2004 32	Vllaznia Shkodër	3–0	Tirana	Shkodër
	Salihi 15'; Sinani 45+3', 88'	Report		Stadium: Loro Boriçi Stadium

5 May 2004 33	Tirana	0–0	Partizani Tirana	Tirana
		Report		Stadium: Qemal Stafa Stadium

8 May 2004 34	Teuta Durrës	2–2	Tirana	Durrës
	Xhafaj 53'; Godinja 88'	Report	Merkoçi 70'; Halili 79'	Stadium: Niko Dovana Stadium

15 May 2004 35	Tirana	1–1	Dinamo Tirana	Tirana
	Xhafa 27'	Report	Leandro Da Silva 22'	Stadium: Qemal Stafa Stadium

21 May 2004 36	Elbasani	2–5	Tirana	Elbasan
	Stojku 67'; Memelli 82'	Report	Dede 40'; Xhafa 49', 53'; Halili 75'; Merkoçi 80'	Stadium: Ruzhdi Bizhuda Stadium

=== Albanian Cup ===
Win Draw Loss

==== Second round ====
17 September 2003 First leg	Turbina Cërrik	0–3	Tirana	Cërrik
		Report	Merkoçi 40', 78'; Tafaj 68'	Stadium: Nexhip Trungu Stadium

1 October 2003 Second leg	Tirana	5–2 (8–2 agg.)	Turbina Cërrik	Tirana
	Merkoçi 40', 66'; Prenga 80'; Shkreli 82'; Agolli 89'	Report	Ranxha 42', 87'	Stadium: Selman Stërmasi Stadium

==== Third round ====
12 November 2003 First leg	Lushnja	0–1	Tirana	Peqin (Note: The first leg was held in Shkumbini Stadium due to reconstruction of Abdurrahman Roza Haxhiu Stadium.)
		Report	Dabulla 80'	Stadium: Shkumbini Stadium

26 November 2003 Second leg	Tirana	2–0 (3–0 agg.)	Lushnja	Tirana
	Fortuzi 75'; Halili 86'	Report		Stadium: Selman Stërmasi Stadium

==== Quarter-finals ====
10 March 2004 First leg	Besa Kavajë	1–3	Tirana	Kavajë
	Kuli 75'	Report	Halili 43'; Merkoçi 67'; Fortuzi 69'	Stadium: Besa Stadium

24 March 2004 Second leg	Tirana	2–1 (5–2 agg.)	Besa Kavajë	Tirana
	Halili 11'; Muka 73'	Report	Daiu 47' (pen.)	Stadium: Selman Stërmasi Stadium

==== Semi-finals ====
7 April 2004 First leg	Dinamo Tirana	3–1	Tirana	Tirana
	Keima Keita 47'; Do Nascimento 87'; Zyambo 89'	Report	Xhafa 48'	Stadium: Qemal Stafa Stadium

21 April 2004 Second leg	Tirana	1–2 (2–5 agg.)	Dinamo Tirana	Tirana
	Sina 28'	Report	Do Nascimento 68'; Qorri 88'	Stadium: Qemal Stafa Stadium

=== UEFA Champions League ===
==== First qualifying round ====
16 July 2003 First leg	Dinamo Tbilisi (Georgia (country))	3–0	(Albania) Tirana	Tbilisi, Georgia
17:00	Melkadze 6'; Anchabadze 45+1'; Daraselia 50' (pen.)	Report		Stadium: Boris Paichadze National Stadium; Referee: David Malcolm (Northern Ireland)

23 July 2003 Second leg	Tirana (Albania)	3–0 (a.e.t.) (3–3 agg.) (4–2 p)	(Georgia (country)) Dinamo Tbilisi	Tirana, Albania
18:00	Lici 11'; Fortuzi 64'; Halili 77'	Report		Stadium: Qemal Stafa Stadium; Referee: Alan Kelly (Ireland)
	Penalties
	Patushi (penalty scored); Lici (penalty scored); Dede (penalty scored); Halili (penalty scored)		(penalty missed) Gogoberishvili; (penalty scored) Samkharadze; (penalty scored) Khizaneishvili; (penalty missed) Akhalaia

==== Second qualifying round ====
30 July 2003 First leg	Tirana (Albania)	1–5	(Austria) GAK	Tirana, Albania
18:00	Xhafa 5'	Report	Bazina 14'; Aufhauser 32'; Naumoski 41', 82'; Standfest 56'	Stadium: Qemal Stafa Stadium; Referee: Georgios Douros (Greece)

6 August 2003 Second leg	GAK (Austria)	2–1 (7–2 agg.)	(Albania) Tirana	Graz, Austria
20:30	Sick 16'; Kollmann 75'	Report	Agolli 90+2'	Stadium: Stadion Graz-Liebenau; Referee: Kristinn Jakobsson (Iceland)

== Statistics ==
=== Squad stats ===
	League	Europe	Cup	Supercup	Total Stats
Games played	36	4	8	1	49
Games won	24	1	6	1	32
Games drawn	8	0	0	0	8
Games lost	4	3	2	0	9
Goals scored	90	5	18	3	116
Goals conceded	36	10	9	0	55
Goal difference	54	–5	9	3	61
Clean sheets	13	1	3	1	18

Last updated: 17 November

=== Top scorers ===
No.	Pos.	Nation	Name	Kategoria Superiore	UEFA Champions League	Albanian Cup	Albanian Supercup	Total
11	FW	(Albania)	Indrit Fortuzi	20	1	2	0	23
20	FW	(Albania)	Fjodor Xhafa	15	1	1	0	17
10	MF	(Albania)	Devi Muka	15	0	1	0	16
15	FW	(Albania)	Mahir Halili	7	1	3	1	12
23	MF	(Albania)	Eldorado Merkoçi	7	0	5	0	12
2	DF	(Albania)	Elvis Sina	4	0	1	1	6
21	MF	(Albania)	Sajmir Patushi	5	0	0	0	5
3	DF	(Albania)	Rezart Dabulla	3	0	1	0	4
9	MF	(Albania)	Sokol Bulku	4	0	0	0	4
15	DF	(Albania)	Ansi Agolli	1	1	1	1	4
19	MF	(Albania)	Suad Liçi	2	1	0	0	3
4	DF	(Albania)	Nevil Dede	2	0	0	0	2
16	DF	(Albania)	Gentian Hajdari	1	0	1	0	2
17	FW	(Albania)	Sokol Prenga	1	0	1	0	2
	DF	(Albania)	Alban Tafaj	1	0	1	0	2
8	MF	(Albania)	Ervin Bulku	1	0	0	0	1
	DF	(Albania)	Gledis Shkreli	0	0	1	0	1
#	Own goals			1	0	0	0	1
TOTAL				90	5	18	3	116

Last updated: 17 November 2015
