= 2004–05 KF Tirana season =

Tirana
2004–05 season
- President: Fatmir Frashëri
- Head coach: Mirel Josa (until 20 August 2004); Sulejman Starova
- Stadium: Qemal Stafa Stadium; Selman Stërmasi Stadium
- Kategoria Superiore: Winners
- Albanian Cup: Runners–up
- Albanian Supercup: Runners–up
- Champions League: 2nd Qualifying Round
- Top goalscorer: League: Altin Rraklli (19); All: Altin Rraklli (19)
Home colours	Away colours

The 2004–05 season was Klubi i Futbollit Tirana's 66th competitive season, 66th consecutive season in the Kategoria Superiore and 84th year in existence as a football club.

== Competitions ==
=== Albanian Supercup ===
Win Draw Loss

15 August 2004 Final	Tirana	0–2	Partizani	Tirana
16:00 CET		Report	Allmuça 2'; Bylykbashi 25'	Stadium: Qemal Stafa Stadium; Referee: Aranit Lulaj

=== Kategoria Superiore ===
==== League table ====
Pos	Team	Pld	W	D	L	GF	GA	GD	Pts	Qualification or relegation
1	Tirana (C)	36	26	6	4	82	32	+50	84	Qualification for the Champions League first qualifying round
2	Elbasani	36	24	7	5	59	27	+32	79	Qualification for the UEFA Cup first qualifying round
3	Dinamo Tirana	36	18	8	10	51	30	+21	62	Qualification for the Intertoto Cup first round
4	Vllaznia	36	19	4	13	80	47	+33	61	
5	Teuta	36	16	4	16	47	49	−2	52	Qualification for the UEFA Cup first qualifying round (Note: Teuta qualified for the UEFA Cup first qualifying round by winning the 2004–05 Albanian Cup.)

Source: Albanian Football Association (in Albanian), RSSSF.org
Rules for classification: 1) points; 2) points in head-to-head matches; 3) goal difference in head-to-head matches; 4) goals scored in head-to-head matches; 5) total goal difference; 6) total goals scored; 7) draw
(C) Champions

==== Results summary ====
Overall								Home						Away					
Pld	W	D	L	GF	GA	GD	Pts	W	D	L	GF	GA	GD	W	D	L	GF	GA	GD
36	26	6	4	82	32	+50	84	11	5	2	40	17	+23	15	1	2	42	15	+27

Last updated: 31 January 2019.
Source: Competitive matches

==== Results by round ====
Round	1	2	3	4	5	6	7	8	9	10	11	12	13	14	15	16	17	18	19	20	21	22	23	24	25	26	27	28	29	30	31	32	33	34	35	36
Ground	H	A	H	A	H	A	H	A	H	A	H	A	H	A	H	A	H	A	H	A	H	A	H	A	H	A	H	A	H	A	H	A	H	A	H	A
Result	W	W	W	W	W	W	W	L	W	W	W	W	W	W	D	W	D	L	W	W	W	W	D	W	D	D	L	W	W	W	D	W	W	W	L	W
Position	5	3	3	1	1	1	1	1	1	1	1	1	1	1	1	1	1	1	1	1	1	1	1	1	1	1	1	1	1	1	1	1	1	1	1	1

Source: Competitive matches
A = Away; H = Home; W = Win; D = Draw; L = Loss

==== Matches ====
21 August 2004 1	Tirana	1–0	Shkumbini	Durrës
	Fortuzi 18'	Report		Stadium: Niko Dovana Stadium

28 August 2004 2	Egnatia	0–2	Tirana	Peqin
		Report	Fortuzi 19', 40' (pen.)	Stadium: Shkumbini Stadium

10 September 2004 3	Tirana	1–0	Laçi	Tirana
	Halili 5'	Report		Stadium: Selman Stërmasi Stadium

18 September 2004 4	Vllaznia	1–2	Tirana	Shkodër
	Abílio 45' (pen.)	Report	Rraklli 6'; Muka 32'	Stadium: Loro Boriçi Stadium

26 September 2004 5	Tirana	3–0	Lushnja	Durrës
	Fortuzi 4'; Xhafa 43'; Rraklli 49'	Report		Stadium: Niko Dovana Stadium

2 October 2004 6	Partizani	2–5	Tirana	Tirana
	Ndreka 40'; Agripino 64'	Report	Patushi 23'; Fortuzi 50', 75'; Muka 70', 80'	Stadium: Qemal Stafa Stadium

16 October 2004 7	Tirana	2–0	Teuta	Tirana
	Muka 37'; Rraklli 61'	Report		Stadium: Selman Stërmasi Stadium

24 October 2004 8	Elbasani	3–1	Tirana	Elbasan
	Merxha 9'; Kaçi 26'; Asllani 62'	Report	Fortuzi 52'	Stadium: Rruzhdi Bizhuta Stadium

30 October 2004 9	Tirana	3–1	Dinamo	Tirana
	Xhafa 11'; Sene 38'; Agolli 66'	Report	Pinari 81'	Stadium: Selman Stërmasi Stadium

5 November 2004 10	Shkumbini	0–1	Tirana	Peqin
		Report	Rraklli 21'	Stadium: Shkumbini Stadium

13 November 2004 11	Tirana	3–1	Egnatia	Tirana
	Fortuzi 33'; Bulku 80' (pen.)	Report	Kuli 45+1'	Stadium: Selman Stërmasi Stadium

20 November 2004 12	Laçi	0–3	Tirana	Kavajë
		Report	Rraklli 46'; Fortuzi 76'; Agolli 87'	Stadium: Besa Stadium

27 November 2004 13	Tirana	2–1	Vllaznia	Tirana
	Rraklli 34', 58'	Report	Sinani 18'	Stadium: Selman Stërmasi Stadium

4 December 2004 14	Lushnja	0–3	Tirana	Lushnje
		Report	Rraklli 11', 24'; Bulku 79'	Stadium: Abdurrahman Roza Haxhiu Stadium

10 December 2004 15	Tirana	3–3	Partizani	Tirana
	Patushi 15'; Fortuzi 34'; Muka 55'	Report	Agripino 2'; Bylykbashi 75' (pen.); Carvalho 85'	Stadium: Qemal Stafa Stadium

15 December 2004 16	Teuta	0–2	Tirana	Durrës
		Report	Rraklli 2'; Patushi 8'	Stadium: Niko Dovana Stadium

18 December 2004 17	Tirana	2–2	Elbasani	Tirana
	Fortuzi 10', 53'	Report	Bejzade 62'; Dede 66'	Stadium: Selman Stërmasi Stadium

22 December 2004 18	Dinamo	2–1	Tirana	Tirana
	Dhëmbi 42', 90+2'	Report	Bulku 73'	Stadium: Selman Stërmasi Stadium

16 January 2005 19	Tirana	2–0	Shkumbini	Fier
	Merkoçi 12'; Muka 38'	Report		Stadium: Loni Papuçiu Stadium

22 January 2005 20	Egnatia	0–1	Tirana	Rrogozhinë
		Report	Bulku 81' (pen.)	Stadium: Rrogozhinë Stadium

29 January 2005 21	Tirana	6–0	Laçi	Kamëz
	Agolii 3'; Muka 13'; Patushi 52', 70'; Pema 73' (pen.)	Report		Stadium: Kamëz Stadium

2 February 2005 22	Vllaznia	0–2	Tirana	Shkodër
		Report	Patushi 30'; Xhafa 45+2'	Stadium: Loro Boriçi Stadium

11 February 2005 23	Tirana	1–1	Lushnja	Tirana
	Xhafa 73'	Report	Devolli 23'	Stadium: Selman Stërmasi Stadium

18 February 2005 24	Partizani	0–1	Tirana	Tirana
	Ndreka 40'; Agripino 64'	Report	Muka 20'	Stadium: Qemal Stafa Stadium

26 February 2005 25	Tirana	2–2	Teuta	Tirana
	Muka 68'; Brahja 85' (o.g.)	Report	Babamusta 15'; Xhafaj 34'	Stadium: Selman Stërmasi Stadium

5 March 2005 26	Elbasani	2–2	Tirana	Elbasan
	Dalipi 12'; Ahmataj 61' (pen.)	Report	Bulku 31' (pen.); Muka 54'	Stadium: Rruzhdi Bizhuta Stadium

12 March 2005 27	Tirana	0–2	Dinamo	Tirana
		Report	El Hadji Goudjabi 8', 73'	Stadium: Qemal Stafa Stadium

19 March 2005 28	Shkumbini	1–2	Tirana	Shijak
	Nexha 79' (pen.)	Report	Rraklli 8'; Xhafa 26'	Stadium: Tofik Jashari Stadium

2 April 2005 29	Tirana	3–1	Egnatia	Kamëz
	Muka 13'; Rraklli 70'; Patushi 80'	Report	Guranjaku 90'	Stadium: Kamëz Stadium

9 April 2005 30	Laçi	0–5	Tirana	Shijak
		Report	Patushi 30'; Rraklli 50', 73'; Sene 75'; Muka 76' (pen.)	Stadium: Tofik Jashari Stadium

16 April 2005 31	Tirana	2–2	Vllaznia	Tirana
	Rraklli 2'; Bulku 83' (pen.)	Report	Sinani 60'; Abílio 79'	Stadium: Qemal Stafa Stadium

23 April 2005 32	Lushnja	1–3	Tirana	Lushnje
	Arberi 83'	Report	Tafaj 13'; Muka 72'; Agolli 89'	Stadium: Abdurrahman Roza Haxhiu Stadium

30 April 2005 33	Tirana	4–0	Partizani	Tirana
	Agolli 22'; Xhafa 49'; Rraklli 65'; Patushi 72'	Report		Stadium: Qemal Stafa Stadium

6 May 2005 34	Teuta	3–5	Tirana	Durrës
	Xhafaj 30' (pen.)	Report	Merkoçi 24', 34'; Rraklli 27', 64', 83'	Stadium: Niko Dovana Stadium

14 May 2005 35	Tirana	0–1	Elbasani	Tirana
		Report	Asllani 21'	Stadium: Selman Stërmasi Stadium

20 May 2005 36	Dinamo	0–1	Tirana	Tirana
		Report	Muka 57'	Stadium: Qemal Stafa Stadium

=== Albanian Cup ===
==== Second round ====
22 September 2004 First leg	Sopoti	2–2	Tirana	Librazhd
	B. Çota 59'; A. Çota 88'	Report	Fortuzi 6', 23'	Stadium: Sopoti Stadium

29 September 2004 Second leg	Tirana	7–0 (9–2 agg.)	Sopoti	Tirana
	Rraklli 42', 57', 65'; Muka 49'; Fortuzi 69', 79', 89'	Report		Stadium: Selman Stërmasi Stadium

==== Third round ====
20 October 2004 First leg	Pogradeci	0–0	Tirana	Pogradec
		Report		Stadium: Gjorgji Kyçyku Stadium

27 October 2004 Second leg	Tirana	5–1 (5–1 agg.)	Pogradeci	Kamëz
	Xhafa 22'; Sina 23'; Fortuzi 31'; Kokunovski 41' (o.g.); Bulku 66'	Report	Maho 12'	Stadium: National Sports Centre

==== Quarter-finals ====
2 March 2005 First leg	Lushnja	1–0	Tirana	Lushnjë
	Nora 85' (pen.)	Report		Stadium: Abdurrahman Roza Haxhiu Stadium

16 March 2005 Second leg	Tirana	3–0 (a.e.t.) (3–1 agg.)	Lushnja	Tirana
	Xhafa 53', 104'; Sene 109'	Report		Stadium: Selman Stërmasi Stadium

==== Semi-finals ====
6 April 2005 First leg	Tirana	1–0	Vllaznia	Tirana
	Xhafa 41'	Report		Stadium: Selman Stërmasi Stadium

20 April 2005 Second leg	Vllaznia	1–3 (1–4 agg.)	Tirana	Shkodër
	Abílio 39' (pen.)	Report	Rraklli 50'; Patushi 67'; Sene 73'	Stadium: Loro Boriçi Stadium

==== Final ====
11 May 2005 Final	Teuta	0–0 (a.e.t.) (6–5 p)	Tirana	Elbasan
17:00 CET		Report		Stadium: Ruzhdi Bizhuta Stadium; Attendance: 10,500; Referee: Albano Janku
	Penalties
	Mançaku (penalty scored); Tetova (penalty scored); D. Xhafa (penalty missed); Kapllani (penalty scored); Gjondeda (penalty scored); Hasho (penalty scored); Hasani (penalty scored)		(penalty scored) Bulku; (penalty scored) Patushi; (penalty scored) Sina; (penalty scored) Tafaj; (penalty missed) F. Xhafa; (penalty scored) Merkoçi; (penalty missed) Hajdari

=== UEFA Champions League ===
==== First qualifying round ====
14 July 2004 First leg	Gomel (Belarus)	0–2	(Albania) Tirana	Gomel, Belarus
17:00 CET		Report	Muka 75'; Fortuzi 89'	Stadium: Central Stadium; Attendance: 7,500; Referee: Brage Sandmoen (Norway)

21 July 2004 Second leg	Tirana (Albania)	0–1 (2–1 agg.)	(Belarus) Gomel	Tirana, Albania
18:00 CET		Report	Bliznyuk 38'	Stadium: Qemal Stafa Stadium; Attendance: 3,500; Referee: Ionică Serea (Romania)

==== Second qualifying round ====
27 July 2004 First leg	Tirana (Albania)	2–3	(Hungary) Ferencváros	Tirana, Albania
18:00 CET	Muka 58', 68'	Report	Huszti 41' (pen.), 90+'; Hajdari 88' (o.g.)	Stadium: Qemal Stafa Stadium; Attendance: 3,000; Referee: Bülent Demirlek (Turkey)

4 August 2004 Second leg	Ferencváros (Hungary)	0–1 (3a–3 agg.)	(Albania) Tirana	Budapest, Hungary
20:00 CET		Report	Muka 13'	Stadium: Üllői úti stadion Attendance: 5,000; Referee: Charlie Richmond (Scotland)
