= Orges Shehi =

Albanian footballer (born 1977)

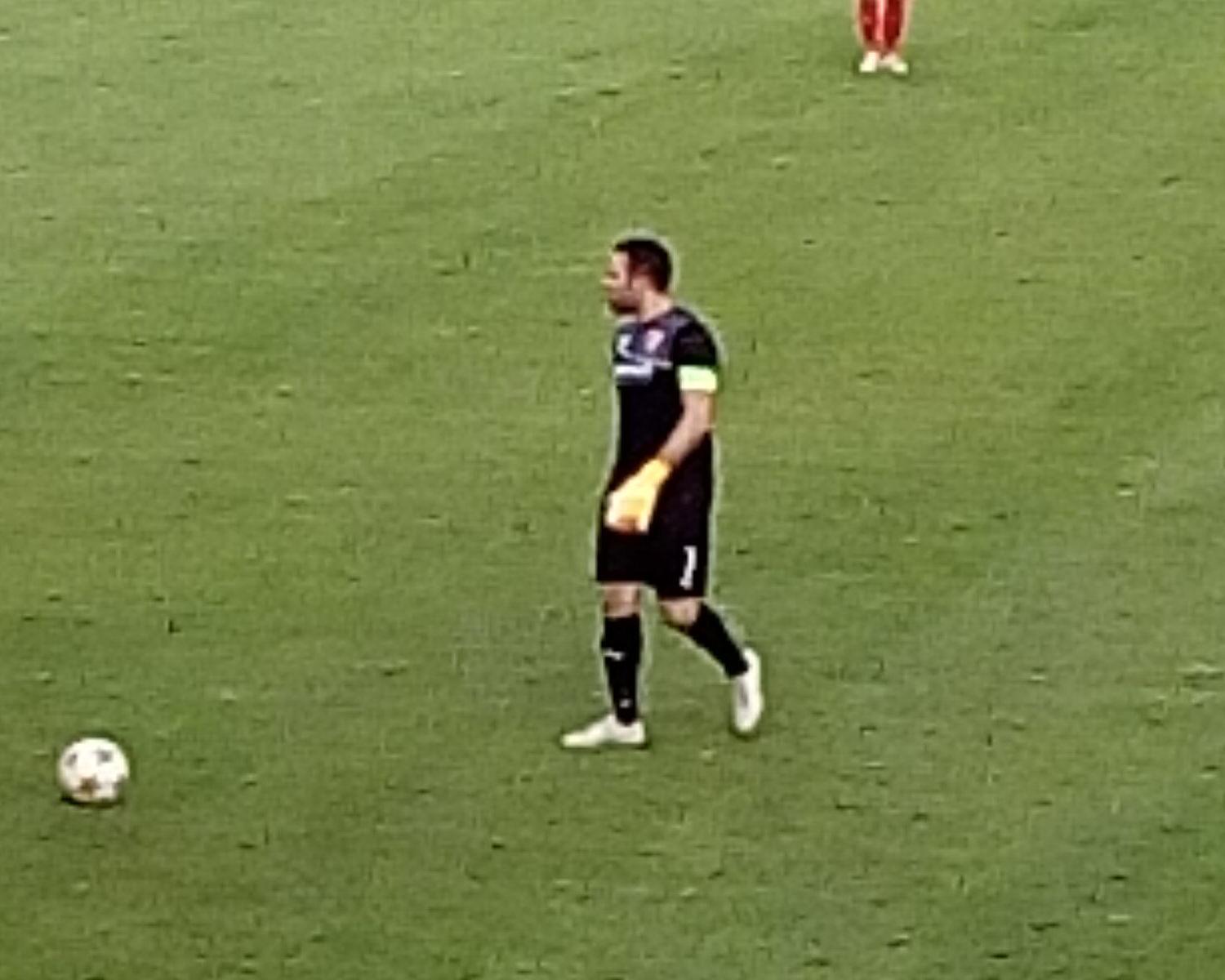
- Shehi with Skënderbeu in 2015

Personal information
- Date of birth: 25 September 1977 (age 49)
- Place of birth: Durrës, PSR Albania
- Height: 1.82 m (6 ft 0 in)
- Position: Goalkeeper

Team information
- Current team: Prishtina (manager)

Youth career
- 1990–1994: Teuta

Senior career*
Years	Team	Apps	(Gls)
1994–2004	Teuta	168	(0)
1998–1999	→ Bylis (loan)	29	(0)
2004–2005	Vllaznia	39	(0)
2005–2009	Partizani	121	(0)
2009–2010	Besa	31	(0)
2010–2018	Skënderbeu	251	(1)
Total		639	(1)

International career
1993–1994	Albania U16	5	(0)
1997–1999	Albania U21	7	(0)
2010–2017	Albania	8	(0)

Managerial career
- 2018–2019: Skënderbeu
- 2020: Kukësi
- 2021–2023: Tirana
- 2023–2024: Partizani
- 2024–2025: Ballkani
- 2026: Tirana
- 2026–: Prishtina
- * Club domestic league appearances and goals

Orges Shehi (born 25 September 1977) is an Albanian professional football coach and former player, who is currently the head coach of Prishtina in the Superleague of Kosovo.

A goalkeeper, Shehi began his professional career with Teuta, progressing through the club's youth system before establishing himself as the first-choice goalkeeper in the mid-1990s. Following a loan spell at Bylis Ballsh during the 1998–99 season, he returned to Teuta and became an undisputed starter, helping the club win the 1999–2000 Albanian Cup while also featuring in several UEFA Cup and UEFA Intertoto Cup campaigns. Over more than a decade with the club, he made nearly 200 appearances in all competitions before joining Vllaznia in 2004. After one and a half seasons with Vllaznia, Shehi moved to Partizani, where he also served as club captain, before joining Besa Kavajë and winning the 2009–10 Albanian Cup. In July 2010, Shehi signed for Skënderbeu, where he became one of the leading figures during the club's most successful period. He won six consecutive Kategoria Superiore titles between 2010–11 and 2015–16, later captaining the side during its domestic dominance and historic appearances in the group stages of the 2015–16 UEFA Europa League and the 2017–18 UEFA Europa League. Widely regarded as one of the greatest goalkeepers in Albanian football history, Shehi retired as one of the country's most decorated players.

At international level, Shehi represented Albania at youth competitions during the mid- and late 1990s, beginning with the under-16 team and later the under-21 team. He was first involved with the senior national team in 1998, but made his debut in November 2010 after a long absence from the squad, ultimately earning eight caps. He was included in the UEFA Euro 2016 squad and remained part of the national setup during the 2018 World Cup qualification campaign, with his final appearance in a matchday squad coming in June 2017. This marked a senior international career spanning 18 years, 9 months and 6 days, making him the player with the longest career span in Albania national team history.

== Club career ==
=== Teuta ===
Shehi began his career with local side Teuta at the age of 12, progressing through the club's youth system before making his professional debut during the 1994–95 Albanian National Championship season. During his first senior campaign and the following 1995–96 National Championship season, he was mainly a backup to Xhevahir Kapllani, making no league appearances in the latter season. On 24 July 1996, Shehi made his UEFA debut in the second leg of the UEFA Cup preliminary round against Košice, coming on in the 88th minute as a substitute for Kujtim Shtama in a 2–1 defeat that eliminated Teuta 6–2 on aggregate. He made nine league appearances during the season as Teuta finished mid-table, while also reaching the quarter-finals of the Albanian Cup, where they were eliminated by Lushnja. The following season marked his breakthrough as Teuta's first-choice goalkeeper, featuring in 32 league matches and missing only two, with the club finishing fifth.

Ahead of the 1998–99 season, Shehi joined Bylis Ballsh on loan, making 29 appearances in the Albanian National Championship and helping the club achieve its then-highest league finish of third place. Bylis finished the campaign just two points behind champions Tirana and recorded the second-best defensive record in the division, conceding only 19 goals. Their third-place finish also secured European qualification for the first time in the club's history. In August 1999, Shehi featured in both legs of Bylis' 1999–2000 UEFA Cup qualifying round tie against Slovak side Inter Bratislava, which ended in a 5–1 aggregate defeat.

After the European campaign, Shehi returned to Teuta and immediately reclaimed the starting goalkeeper role, appearing in all 26 league fixtures of the 1999–2000 Albanian National Championship. Teuta finished third with 49 points, three behind joint leaders Tirana and Tomori, while conceding only 16 goals, the second-best defensive record in the league. By this point, he had also become club captain. He was a regular starter in the Albanian Cup, where Teuta reached the final after overcoming Dinamo on away goals following a 3–3 aggregate draw in the semi-finals; the final against Lushnja ended goalless after extra time, with Teuta winning 5–4 on penalties to secure the trophy and qualification for the UEFA Cup. Shehi featured in the 2000 Albanian Supercup on 13 January 2001, where Teuta were defeated 1–0 by Tirana.

Shehi began the 2000–01 season by appearing in both legs of Teuta's UEFA Cup qualifying round tie against Austrian side Rapid Vienna in August 2000, as the club were eliminated 6–0 on aggregate. In the Albanian Cup, Shehi took penalty duties and scored the first goal of his career on 27 January 2001, converting from the spot in a 3–0 second-leg win over Pogradeci in the second round; with a 4–1 aggregate victory, Teuta advanced to the quarter-finals, where he again scored from the penalty spot in a 5–2 second-leg win over Lushnja that overturned a 2–1 first-leg defeat. In the semi-finals, Teuta overcame Vllaznia with two 2–1 wins to reach the final, where Shehi played the full match against Tirana on 26 May 2001, though Teuta lost 5–0. In the Championship, he featured in 25 of 26 matches as the club finished sixth.

In the 2001–02 Albanian Cup, Teuta progressed through three two-legged rounds, recording one clean sheet per tie and conceding only one goal in each round before being eliminated 2–1 on aggregate by Dinamo Tirana in the semi-finals. In the Championship, Shehi made 23 appearances as Teuta finished fourth, while conceding only 19 goals throughout the campaign, the third-best defensive record in the division. As a result, Teuta qualified for the UEFA Intertoto Cup, where they defeated Maltese side Valletta 2–1 on aggregate, with Shehi featuring in both legs and producing several notable performances. Teuta advanced to the second round, where he played both legs against Gloria Bistrița, keeping a clean sheet in a 1–0 home win in the second leg, although the club was ultimately eliminated 3–1 on aggregate. In the Championship, Shehi made 25 appearances as Teuta finished fourth. In the Albanian Cup, he featured in both semi-final legs against Vllaznia as Teuta progressed to the final with a 3–2 aggregate win, before playing the full match in a 1–0 defeat to Dinamo Tirana, after which the club missed out on European qualification for the following season.

Following the arrival of Alfred Osmani ahead of the 2003–04 season, Shehi faced increased competition for the starting goalkeeper position. In the Championship, he made 27 appearances in 36 matches as Teuta finished mid-table and secured qualification for the Intertoto Cup. In the cup, Teuta reached the quarter-finals before being eliminated. This proved to be his final season with the club before joining fellow top-flight side Vllaznia, ending a decade-long spell at Teuta.

=== Vllaznia ===
Shehi made his debut for Vllaznia on 20 June 2004, starting in a 0–0 draw against Israeli side Hapoel Be'er Sheva in the first leg of the UEFA Intertoto Cup first round. He kept a clean sheet in a 3–0 away victory in the return leg, helping Vllaznia progress to the next round, where they faced Slaven Belupo; Shehi played every minute across both legs as Vllaznia were eliminated after a 2–0 away defeat followed by a 1–0 home win, losing the tie on aggregate.

He made his league debut on 21 August 2004 in the opening match of the 2004–05 Kategoria Superiore, starting in a 6–1 victory over his former side Teuta. He also featured in the following league match, keeping a clean sheet against Dinamo Tirana. Shehi made 34 appearances during the season as Vllaznia finished fourth in the league, missing out on European qualification by a single point, while also reaching the semi-finals of the Albanian Cup. He began the following 2005–06 Kategoria Superiore season on 27 August 2005, featuring in the opening five matchdays before departing for Partizani Tirana for the remainder of the campaign.

=== Partizani ===
Shehi made his debut for Partizani Tirana on 19 November 2005, starting in a 2–1 victory over Dinamo Tirana in the capital derby. He quickly established himself as the club's first-choice goalkeeper and went on to feature in all but one of Partizani's remaining league matches during the season, making 24 appearances and keeping 11 clean sheets, including a run of five consecutive clean sheets in the middle of the campaign, while conceding 20 of the club's 35 league goals. Partizani finished fourth in the league with 60 points, narrowly behind fellow Tirana-based sides Tirana and Dinamo, securing qualification for the 2006 UEFA Intertoto Cup first round.

Shehi made his European debut in mid-June 2006 in the Intertoto Cup first round against Cypriot side Ethnikos Achna, featuring in both legs as Partizani lost 4–2 away from home and, despite winning the return leg 2–1, were eliminated on aggregate. In the 2006–07 Kategoria Superiore, Shehi played 32 of 33 league matches and kept 17 clean sheets, helping Partizani become the best defensive team in the league with only 25 goals conceded, although the club finished fourth and failed to secure European qualification for the following season.

In the 2007–08 Kategoria Superiore, Shehi played all 33 league matches, recording five clean sheets early in the campaign and a further 12 over the remainder of the season, while conceding a total of 22 goals. His performances helped Partizani collect 65 points and finish as runners-up, five points behind champions Dinamo Tirana, while securing qualification for the UEFA Cup first qualifying round. In the decisive league match against Dinamo Tirana on 17 May 2008, with Partizani still in contention for the championship title, Shehi reportedly suffered a broken hand during the match but remained on the field after receiving treatment; Partizani went on to lose 2–1.

In 2008, he was named club captain. In the 2008–09 Kategoria Superiore, Shehi remained a regular starter, making 31 league appearances and keeping five clean sheets while conceding 36 goals. Partizani struggled throughout the campaign, particularly in attack, recording only eight wins, nine draws and 14 defeats as the club spent much of the season near the bottom of the table and remained involved in the relegation battle. In the penultimate matchday, Partizani defeated fellow relegation contenders Elbasani, moving into eighth place and temporarily clear of the relegation play-out zone. Shehi did not feature in the final matchday, as Partizani lost 1–0 to Lushnja; although Lushnja drew level on 36 points, Partizani remained ahead on head-to-head record and finished tenth, avoiding automatic relegation but dropping into the relegation play-out after being overtaken by both Apolonia and Bylis following their final-round victories.

In the relegation play-out on 29 May 2009 against Kastrioti, Shehi featured as Partizani were defeated and ultimately relegated, in a match followed by tensions and controversy after club president Albert Xhani entered the field and confronted an assistant referee following the disallowed goal. Following the club's relegation, Shehi left for Besa Kavajë.

=== Besa Kavajë ===
Shehi joined Besa in July 2009, reuniting with his former Partizani coach Shpëtim Duro and signing a one-year contract. He was assigned the number 1 shirt and made his competitive debut on 23 August, keeping a clean sheet in a 2–0 home victory over Vllaznia in the opening league match of the season. He enjoyed a strong start to the campaign, conceding only two goals in the club's first nine league matches and recording a streak of 731 consecutive minutes without conceding, as Besa remained unbeaten through their opening eight fixtures and emerged as title contenders. Both runs came to an end on 1 November 2009, when Besa suffered their first defeat of the season, losing 1–0 to Kastrioti. On 24 December, Shehi was sent off in the 45th minute of a controversial 1–0 victory over newly promoted Gramozi after fouling an opposing player inside the penalty area, although the referee awarded a free kick instead of a penalty, prompting protests from the Gramozi bench.

Shehi made 31 league appearances during the 2009–10 Kategoria Superiore season, helping Besa finish as runners-up to Dinamo Tirana. He also featured in seven Albanian Cup matches, captaining the side in the final on 9 May and playing the full match as Besa came from behind to defeat Vllaznia 2–1 with the winning goal scored in the 97th minute of extra time. The triumph marked the second major trophy of Shehi's career to which he contributed on the field, following the 2000 Albanian Cup, and his third overall after also being part of the 1995 Albanian Cup-winning squad without making an appearance. It also secured Besa's second Albanian Cup title after 2007 and qualification for the UEFA Europa League for the following season. At the end of the season, he received the "Fair Play" Award from the association "Sporti na Bashkon". Shehi was included in Besa's squad for the first leg of the 2010–11 UEFA Europa League second qualifying round on 15 July 2010 and played the full match in a 5–0 home defeat to Olympiacos. He left the club shortly afterwards to join Skënderbeu for the upcoming season, with the transfer having been announced the previous day.

=== Skënderbeu ===
In July 2010, Shehi completed a transfer to fellow Kategoria Superiore side Skënderbeu. He was assigned the number 1 shirt and made his debut on 23 August against former club Besa in the opening match of the 2010–11 Kategoria Superiore, keeping a clean sheet in a 2–0 away victory. He quickly established himself as the club's first-choice goalkeeper, making 32 league appearances as Skënderbeu won the championship for the first time since the 1933 Albanian National Championship, earning Shehi the first league title of his career and ending the club's wait of nearly eight decades for a national championship. On 18 August 2011, Shehi featured in the 2011 Albanian Supercup against Tirana, but Skënderbeu lost 1–0.

In the 2011–12 Kategoria Superiore, Shehi made 25 league appearances as Skënderbeu retained the championship title, becoming only the second club in the post-communist era to win back-to-back league titles. Skënderbeu also reached the 2012 Albanian Cup final, where they lost 1–0 to Tirana after extra time, with Shehi playing the full match. He also featured in the 2012 Albanian Supercup on 19 August 2012 against Tirana, but Skënderbeu lost 2–1 after conceding a late own goal.

In December 2012, Shehi was named Albanian Footballer of the Year, becoming the first Skënderbeu player to receive the award. During the 2012–13 Kategoria Superiore, Shehi played every league match as Skënderbeu secured a third consecutive title and became the outright record holder for appearances in the Albanian top flight, surpassing Blendi Nallbani's previous mark of 471 matches.

One of the highlights of his career came in the 2013–14 UEFA Europa League play-off round against Chornomorets Odesa. After both legs ended 1–1 after extra time, Skënderbeu lost 7–6 on penalties, with Shehi saving two spot-kicks and also converting one himself.

"I don't know how he does it. I just know he is always ready to play and is amazing. He has done this for almost 20 years and he could do it for more."

— Manager Mirel Josa on Shehi's 500th Kategoria Superiore match, 2014

Shehi played his 500th top-flight match on 20 April 2014 in Skënderbeu's 1–0 win over Besa. Overall, he made 32 league appearances, collecting 2880 minutes as Skënderbeu won a fourth consecutive title.

On 6 December 2014, he scored his first goal for Skënderbeu, converting a penalty in a 3–2 win over Teuta. He was ever-present in the league during the 2014–15 Kategoria Superiore season, making all 36 appearances as Skënderbeu won a fifth consecutive league title. At the end of the season, he also received the "Fair Play" award for the second time in his career.

On 14 June 2015, Shehi signed a one-year contract extension. In the 2015–16 Kategoria Superiore, he made 35 league appearances and played a key role in the club's success. On 14 March 2016 against Partizani, he conceded early due to an error but later saved a penalty from Stevan Račić, helping Skënderbeu secure a draw.

In July 2016, following the retirement of long-time servant Bledi Shkëmbi, Shehi was named the new team captain. Skënderbeu were originally qualified for the 2016–17 UEFA Champions League qualifying phase and play-off round but were excluded from the competition by UEFA due to match-fixing allegations. He made his season debut in the 2016 Albanian Supercup, a 3–1 defeat to Kukësi.

In July 2017, Shehi expressed his intention to retire after the club's UEFA Europa League campaign, after rumours linking Enea Koliçi with a possible transfer in Korçë. On 3 August 2017, in the return leg of the 2017–18 UEFA Europa League third qualifying round against Mladá Boleslav, Shehi made several crucial second-half saves to help Skënderbeu win 2–1 and level the aggregate score. The match went to extra time and then a penalty shootout, where Shehi scored Skënderbeu’s first penalty and saved opponents last attempt as Skënderbeu won 4–2 to progress to the play-off round. The club eventually reached the 2017–18 UEFA Europa League group stage for the second time in its history after eliminating Dinamo Zagreb on away goals (1–1 on aggregate).

Shehi was ever-present in all Group B fixtures as Skënderbeu finished last with 5 points. He notably kept a clean sheet in matchday 3 against Partizan Belgrade in a goalless draw. Following the end of the group stage, Shehi was ranked third for total saves, with 26 in all competitions. He described 2017 as the best year of his career, adding that he was likely to retire at the end of the season. On 18 March 2018, Shehi was injured during a league match against Luftëtari and was replaced in the 63rd minute after suffering a knee ligament injury that ruled him out for at least a month.

He concluded the 2017–18 season with 28 league appearances as Skënderbeu won the championship for the 8th time in history. He played his final match on 27 May in the 2018 Albanian Cup Final against Laçi, keeping a clean sheet as Skënderbeu won 1–0 and completed the domestic double for the first time in the club’s history. In June, after the Court of Arbitration for Sport upheld UEFA’s decision to exclude Skënderbeu from UEFA competitions for the next 10 years, Shehi announced his retirement from football.

== International career ==
At international level, Shehi was first capped for the Albania under-16 team during the 1994 UEFA European Under-16 Championship qualifiers, keeping clean sheets in victories over both group rivals as Albania topped their qualifying group to reach the final tournament, where he played all three group-stage matches and the team finished bottom with one point. He later represented the under-21 side between 1997 and 1999, making seven appearances during the 1998 and 2000 European U-21 qualification campaigns. In September 1998, he received his first senior call-up from coach Astrit Hafizi for a UEFA Euro 2000 qualifying match against Georgia, remaining an unused substitute.

During his first spell at Skënderbeu in 2010, Shehi returned to the national team after more than a decade, replacing the injured Arjan Beqaj for the friendly against Macedonia on 17 November under coach Josip Kuže, making his debut as a half-time substitute in a goalless draw. In 2012, Shehi became a regular member of the squad under coach Gianni De Biasi, earning two further caps including his first start and full 90 minutes in a 2–1 friendly win over Qatar in May, before the 2014 FIFA World Cup qualification campaign, where he was mainly third-choice goalkeeper behind Etrit Berisha and Samir Ujkani and remained on the bench during Group E. Afterwards, he made three further second-half friendly appearances, conceding no goal in a goalless draw and two victories.

In March 2014, he became second-choice goalkeeper following Samir Ujkani's departure to represent the newly accepted Kosovo national team. Aged 37, Shehi remained a backup during the UEFA Euro 2016 qualifying campaign, where Albania finished second in Group I to qualify for their first major tournament, and he was included in Albania's 23-man squad for UEFA Euro 2016 on 31 May 2016 but remained an unused substitute throughout the group stage as Albania were eliminated after finishing bottom among the third-placed teams.

He remained a squad member during the 2018 FIFA World Cup qualification campaign, initially as second-choice, making three squad appearances early in the campaign before dropping out of regular squad selection following the emergence of Thomas Strakosha, while taking on a supporting role within the squad. His final inclusion came on 11 June 2017 with Etrit Berisha suspended, meaning his international career spanned 18 years, 9 months and 6 days from his first senior squad inclusion in 1998, making him the player with the longest career span in Albania's history.

== Managerial career ==
On 5 July 2018, Shehi was presented as the new coach of Skënderbeu for the 2018–19 season. He made his senior managerial debut on 12 August 2018, leading Skënderbeu to a 3–2 win over Laçi in the 2018 Albanian Supercup match. Five days later, he managed his first Albanian Superliga match, with Skënderbeu defeating Partizani 1–0 through an injury-time penalty by Gjergji Muzaka.

He won the 2021–22 Kategoria Superiore with KF Tirana.

On 27 December 2023, Shehi was appointed as head coach at Partizani, marking his return to the club nearly 15 years later.

He was appointed head coach of Kosovar team Ballkani on 6 December 2024. He left the club on 19 November 2025 after notifying players and staff that he would depart in January.

On 24 February 2026, Shehi was officially reappointed as head coach of Tirana, signing a contract until the end of the 2025–26 season, with his first task to improve the team's position and stabilize performance, as Tirana was second-to-last in the league and at risk of relegation.

== Personal life ==
Shehi is married to his long partner Elisabeta Shehi; the two met since the early youth years and together have two children, a boy named Aris Shehi and a girl named Serena Shehi . His favourite footballer is Juventus goalkeeper Gianluigi Buffon.

Following Albania's historic participation at UEFA Euro 2016, Shehi was among the members of the national team who were issued diplomatic passports by the Albanian government in recognition of their achievement.

== Career statistics ==
=== Club ===
Appearances and goals by club, season and competition
Club	Season	League			Cup		Europe		Supercup		Total	
Club	Season	Division	Apps	Goals	Apps	Goals	Apps	Goals	Apps	Goals	Apps	Goals
Teuta	1994–95	Albanian Superliga	1	0	0	0	—		—		1	0
Teuta	1995–96	Albanian Superliga	0	0	0	0	—		—		0	0
Teuta	1996–97	Albanian Superliga	9	0	0	0	1 (Note: Appearance(s) in UEFA Cup)	0	—		10	0
Teuta	1997–98	Albanian Superliga	32	0	0	0	—		—		32	0
Teuta	1999–00	Albanian Superliga	26	0	3	0	2	0	—		31	0
Teuta	2000–01	Albanian Superliga	25	0	3	2	2	0	1	0	31	2
Teuta	2001–02	Albanian Superliga	23	0	0	0	—		—		23	0
Teuta	2002–03	Albanian Superliga	25	0	3	0	2	0	—		30	0
Teuta	2003–04	Albanian Superliga	27	0	0	0	—		—		27	0
Teuta	Total		168	0	9	2	7	0	1	0	185	2
Bylis (loan)	1998–99	Albanian Superliga	29	0	0	0	2	0	—		31	0
Vllaznia	2004–05	Albanian Superliga	34	0	0	0	4 (Note: Appearance(s) in UEFA Intertoto Cup)	0	—		38	0
Vllaznia	2005–06	Albanian Superliga	5	0	0	0	—		—		5	0
Vllaznia	Total		39	0	0	0	4	0	—		43	0
Partizani	2005–06	Albanian Superliga	24	0	0	0	—		—		24	0
Partizani	2006–07	Albanian Superliga	32	0	0	0	2	0	—		34	0
Partizani	2007–08	Albanian Superliga	33	0	0	0	—		—		33	0
Partizani	2008–09	Albanian Superliga	32	0	0	0	—		—		32	0
Partizani	Total		121	0	0	0	2	0	—		123	0
Besa	2009–10	Albanian Superliga	31	0	7	0	—		—		38	0
Besa	2010–11	Albanian Superliga	0	0	0	0	1 (Note: Appearance(s) in UEFA Europa League)	0	—		1	0
Besa	Total		31	0	7	0	1	0	—		39	0
Skënderbeu	2010–11	Albanian Superliga	33	0	2	0	—		—		35	0
Skënderbeu	2011–12	Albanian Superliga	25	0	13	0	2 (Note: Appearance(s) in UEFA Champions League)	0	1 (Note: Appearance in Albanian Supercup)	0	41	0
Skënderbeu	2012–13	Albanian Superliga	26	0	6	0	2	0	1	0	35	0
Skënderbeu	2013–14	Albanian Superliga	32	0	7	0	6 (Note: Four appearances in UEFA Champions League, two in UEFA Europa League)	0	1	0	46	0
Skënderbeu	2014–15	Albanian Superliga	36	1	4	0	2	0	1	0	43	1
Skënderbeu	2015–16	Albanian Superliga	35	0	4	0	12 (Note: Six appearances in UEFA Champions League, six in UEFA Europa League)	0	0	0	51	0
Skënderbeu	2016–17	Albanian Superliga	36	0	7	0	—		1	0	44	0
Skënderbeu	2017–18	Albanian Superliga	28	0	2	0	14	0	—		44	0
Skënderbeu	Total		251	1	46	0	38	0	5	0	342	1
Career total			639	1	62	2	54	0	6	0	760	3

=== International ===
Appearances and goals by national team and year
National team	Year	Apps	Goals
Albania	1998	0	0
Albania	2010	1	0
Albania	2012	2	0
Albania	2013	1	0
Albania	2014	2	0
Albania	2015	1	0
Albania	2016	1	0
Albania	2017	0	0
Total		8	0

== Managerial statistics ==
As of match played 20 November 2026

Managerial record by team and tenure
Team	Nat	From	To	Record								Ref
Team	Nat	From	To	G	W	D	L	GF	GA	GD	Win %	Ref
Skënderbeu	(Albania)	18 June 2018	30 June 2019	45	24	4	17	68	38	+30	53.33	
Kukësi	(Albania)	2 March 2020	30 July 2020	13	8	2	3	24	13	+11	61.54	
Tirana	(Albania)	27 January 2021	5 October 2023	120	66	24	30	203	117	+86	55.00	
Partizani	(Albania)	26 December 2023	5 August 2024	26	13	5	8	37	25	+12	50.00	
Ballkani	(Kosovo)	6 December 2024	19 November 2025	38	18	12	8	66	42	+24	47.37	
Tirana	(Albania)	24 February 2026	1 June 2026	12	7	2	3	16	11	+5	58.33	
Prishtina	(Kosovo)	5 June 2026	Present	14	11	2	1	28	10	+18	78.57	
Career total				268	147	51	70	443	256	+187	54.85	—

== Honours ==
=== Player ===
Teuta

- Albanian Cup: 1994–95, 1999–2000

Besa

- Albanian Cup: 2009–10

Skënderbeu

- Albanian Superliga: 2010–11, 2011–12, 2012–13, 2013–14, 2014–15, 2015–16, 2017–18
- Albanian Cup: 2017–18
- Albanian Supercup: 2013, 2014

Individual

- Albanian Superliga Fair Play Award: 2009–10, 2014–15
- Albanian Footballer of the Year: 2012

=== Manager ===
Skënderbeu

- Albanian Supercup: 2018

Tirana

- Albanian Superliga: 2021–22 runner-up: 2022–23
- Albanian Supercup: 2022
- Albanian Cup runner-up: 2023

Partizani

- Albanian Superliga: runner-up: 2023–24

Ballkani

- Football Superleague of Kosovo: runner-up: 2024–25

Individual

- Kategoria Superiore Coach of the Month: "October 2022". Kategoria Superiore.
- Kategoria Superiore Coach of the Month:
- FSHF :Best Coach of the Season 2021–2022, 2022–2023
