= 2003–04 Kategoria Superiore =

Kategoria Superiore
- Season: 2003–04
- Dates: 23 August 2003 – 21 May 2004
- Champions: Tirana; 21st Albanian title
- Relegated: Besa; Flamurtari
- Champions League: Tirana
- UEFA Cup: Dinamo Tirana; Partizani
- Intertoto Cup: Vllaznia; Teuta
- Matches: 180
- Goals: 543 (3.02 per match)
- Top goalscorer: Vioresin Sinani (36 goals)

The 2003–04 Kategoria Superiore was the 68th season of top-tier football in Albania and the first season under the name Kategoria Superiore.

== Teams ==
=== Stadia and last season ===
Locations of the 2003–04 Kategoria Superiore teams

Team	Location	Stadium	Capacity	Last season
Besa	Kavajë	Besa Stadium	8,000	9th
Dinamo Tirana	Tirana	Qemal Stafa Stadium (Note: Dinamo Tirana, Partizani and Tirana all shared the Qemal Stafa Stadium as well as the Selman Stërmasi Stadium.)	19,700	6th
Elbasani	Elbasan	Ruzhdi Bizhuta Stadium	15,000	8th
Flamurtari	Vlorë	Flamurtari Stadium	15,000	7th
Lushnja	Lushnjë	Abdurrahman Roza Haxhiu Stadium	12,000	10th
Partizani	Tirana	Qemal Stafa Stadium	19,700	3rd
Shkumbini	Peqin	Shkumbini Stadium	6,000	5th
Teuta	Durrës	Niko Dovana Stadium	12,040	4th
Tirana	Tirana	Qemal Stafa Stadium	19,700	Champions
Vllaznia	Shkodër	Loro Boriçi Stadium	15,000	2nd

== League table ==
Pos	Team	Pld	W	D	L	GF	GA	GD	Pts	Qualification or relegation
1	Tirana (C)	36	24	8	4	90	36	+54	80	Qualification for the Champions League first qualifying round
2	Dinamo Tirana	36	21	8	7	68	39	+29	71	Qualification for the UEFA Cup first qualifying round
3	Vllaznia	36	21	5	10	77	51	+26	68	Qualification for the Intertoto Cup first round
4	Partizani	36	20	7	9	65	39	+26	67	Qualification for the UEFA Cup first qualifying round (Note: Partizani qualified for the UEFA Cup first qualifying round by winning the 2003–04 Albanian Cup.)
5	Teuta	36	14	10	12	57	49	+8	52	Qualification for the Intertoto Cup first round
6	Lushnja	36	11	9	16	35	52	−17	42	
7	Shkumbini	36	12	5	19	44	61	−17	41	
8	Elbasani	36	10	10	16	47	55	−8	40	
9	Besa (R)	36	8	5	23	36	81	−45	29	Relegation to the 2004–05 Kategoria e Parë
10	Flamurtari (R)	36	3	5	28	24	80	−56	14	Relegation to the 2004–05 Kategoria e Parë

Source: Albanian Football Association (in Albanian), RSSSF.org
Rules for classification: 1) points; 2) points in head-to-head matches; 3) goal difference in head-to-head matches; 4) goals scored in head-to-head matches; 5) total goal difference; 6) total goals scored; 7) draw
(C) Champions; (R) Relegated

== Results ==
Each team plays every opponent four times, twice at home and twice away, for a total of 36 games.

=== First half of season ===
Home \ Away	BES	DIN	ELB	FLA	LUS	PAR	SKU	TEU	TIR	VLL
Besa		0–0	1–1	0–0	0–1	2–3	1–0	1–2	1–2	0–2
Dinamo	2–0		1–0	2–0	0–0	0–2	2–0	1–1	0–0	3–0
Elbasani	1–2	0–1		2–1	4–0	0–0	5–0	1–1	1–1	2–2
Flamurtari	1–0	2–3	1–1		1–5	0–3	3–0	0–0	0–3	1–2
Lushnja	0–1	0–1	2–0	1–0		1–0	0–0	0–1	0–6	2–1
Partizani	3–1	2–1	4–2	5–0	1–0		1–0	3–1	3–1	4–1
Shkumbini	1–2	1–4	2–0	2–1	2–0	0–0		0–0	1–3	1–3
Teuta	4–1	3–4	3–1	2–0	2–0	1–1	1–0		0–0	1–1
Tirana	7–1	5–1	0–0	2–1	2–1	1–0	5–2	1–3		3–2
Vllaznia	3–1	1–4	1–0	3–1	1–0	2–1	4–0	0–2	1–3	

Source: Albanian Football Association
Legend: Blue = home team win; Yellow = draw; Red = away team win.

=== Second half of season ===
Home \ Away	BES	DIN	ELB	FLA	LUS	PAR	SKU	TEU	TIR	VLL
Besa		1–3	3–4	2–0	0–0	3–4	1–4	2–1	2–4	2–1
Dinamo	3–2		5–0	2–0	2–1	3–1	2–1	3–1	3–0	1–1
Elbasani	4–0	2–1		3–0	0–0	1–1	2–1	2–0	2–5	2–2
Flamurtari	0–1	0–3	1–2		2–2	0–1	1–2	3–1	0–2	0–1
Lushnja	1–0	1–1	1–0	4–0		0–0	0–0	3–2	1–1	3–2
Partizani	1–0	5–2	2–1	1–1	5–1		4–2	2–1	0–1	0–1
Shkumbini	1–1	1–0	2–1	4–0	4–2	3–0		1–0	0–2	0–1
Teuta	6–1	2–2	1–0	3–1	3–1	2–1	1–2		2–2	2–2
Tirana	5–0	1–1	3–0	5–1	3–0	0–0	3–2	3–0		5–1
Vllaznia	6–0	2–1	4–0	5–1	4–1	3–1	5–2	3–1	3–0	

Source: Albanian Football Association
Legend: Blue = home team win; Yellow = draw; Red = away team win.

== Season statistics ==
=== Top goalscorers ===
Rank	Player	Club	Goals
1	(Albania) Vioresin Sinani	Vllaznia	36
2	(Albania) Daniel Xhafaj	Teuta	21
3	(Albania) Indrit Fortuzi	Tirana	20
4	(Brazil) Abílio	Partizani	19
5	(Albania) Edi Martini	Vllaznia	17
6	(Albania) Fjodor Xhafa	Tirana	15
6	(Albania) Ilir Qorri	Dinamo Tirana	15
8	(Albania) Devi Muka	Tirana	14
8	(Albania) Hamdi Salihi	Vllaznia	14
10	(Zambia) January Zyambo	Dinamo Tirana	13

== Attendances ==
#	Club	Average
1	Vllaznia	4,255
2	Teuta	3,167
3	Elbasani	2,842
4	Partizani	2,813
5	Tiranë	2,645
6	Shkumbini	2,227
7	Besa	1,965
8	Lushnja	1,469
9	Flamurtari	1,455
10	Dinamo Tiranë	993
