= Gjergji Muzaka =

Albanian footballer (born 1984)

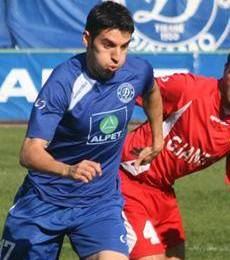
- Muzaka in action with Dinamo Tirana.

Personal information
- Date of birth: 26 September 1984 (age 42)
- Place of birth: Tirana, Albania
- Height: 1.82 m (6 ft 0 in)
- Position: Midfielder

Youth career
- 1999–2000: Partizani Tirana
- 2000–2001: Paris Saint-Germain

Senior career*
Years	Team	Apps	(Gls)
2001–2008	Partizani Tirana	165	(38)
2004–2005	→ Iraklis (loan)	3	(0)
2008–2010	Tirana	59	(12)
2010–2011	Dinamo Tirana	15	(1)
2011–2012	→ Skënderbeu Korçë (loan)	40	(16)
2012–2013	Flamurtari Vlorë	24	(12)
2013–2014	Skënderbeu Korçë	31	(4)
2014	Flamurtari Vlorë	17	(3)
2015–2016	Tirana	43	(7)
2017–2020	Skënderbeu Korçë	80	(16)
Total		477	(109)

International career
2002–2003	Albania U19	3	(1)
2003–2007	Albania U21	13	(2)
2008–2013	Albania	21	(1)
- * Club domestic league appearances and goals

Gjergji Muzaka (born 26 September 1984) is an Albanian former professional footballer who played as a midfielder.

A product of Partizani Tirana academy, Muzaka begun his career as a talented youth player, which prompted Paris Saint-Germain to sign him in 2000. His spell in France was short-lived, however, as he returned at Partizani one year later and commenced his professional career as 17-year-old. Muzaka played for eight years for The Red Bulls, notably winning the Albanian Cup title and also having a brief spell in Greece at Iraklis as a loanee in 2004. In 2008, he switched clubs, joining Partizani's fierce rivals, KF Tirana. In the following years, he also represented Dinamo Tirana, Flamurtari Vlorë (twice) and Skënderbeu Korçë (twice), achieving a great success with the latter, winning three Albanian Superliga titles between 2011 and 2014.

In January 2015, Muzaka returned to Tirana, but his second spell was marred by consistent injuries and off-field problems, including with club president Refik Halili. He left the club in controversial fashion in January 2017, accusing Halili of not paying him accordingly during his time there; Muzaka filled an appeal at the Conflict Resolution Room of AFA and won, but is yet to take is wages. He returned to Skënderbeu for a second time, and after a slow start, he aided the club to win the championship title in 2017–18 season.

Prior to making his senior debut, Muzaka represented Albania at under-19 and -21 levels. He earned his first cap for the Albania national team in 2008, and since then, has made 23 appearances.

== Club career ==
=== Early career ===
Born in Tirana to the noble Muzaka family. Muzaka began his playing career with local side Partizani Tirana when he was just a teenager. He played for the Partizani U17s where he attracted the interest of several foreign clubs with his performances on the right hand side of midfield. One of these foreign clubs was French giants Paris Saint-Germain, who in 2000 offered Muzaka a contract at the club. Muzaka accepted and left Partizani at the age of just 16, joining the PSG youth team. However, after just one year in France, Muzaka moved back to Albania and back to Partizani before the beginning of the 2001–02 season.

=== Partizani Tirana ===
After returning to Albania, Muzaka was placed into the first team of Partizani. In the 2001–02 season he played 8 league match where he scored a goal with Partizani who finished the league in the 3rd place qualifying for the 2002–03 UEFA Cup qualifying round. He made his UEFA competition debut appearing in the two legged game for the 2002–03 UEFA Cup qualifying round against Hapoel Tel Aviv in August 2002 where Partizani got eliminated losing both matches on aggregate 5–1. In the entire 2002–03 season Muzaka earned 20 overall appearances scoring 4 goals with team ending the season again in the 3rd place. He established himself as a starter in the 2003–04 season under coach Sulejman Mema playing 33 matches and scoring 10 goals winning his first trophy of career, the 2003–04 Albanian Cup and finishing 4th in the league.

In the summer of 2006, he missed a trial at SpVgg Unterhaching due to injury, and also missed the team's UEFA Intertoto Cup matches against Ethnikos Achna.

Partizani begun the 2006–07 Albanian Superliga season by winning 3–2 at home against Apolonia Fier, with Muzaka making history by netting inside 10 seconds make it the fastest ever goal scored in the history of Albanian Superliga. His record was broken three years later by Migen Memelli.

==== Loan to Iraklis ====
In July 2004. Muzaka was sent on loan to Greek club Iraklis for the 2004–05 Alpha Ethniki until 31 December 2004. He made only 3 league appearances prior returning to Partizani for the second half of the 2004–05 Albanian Superliga where he went on to play 11 league games and to score 2 goals with Partizani ranking in the 8th place to avoid relegation.

=== Tirana ===
In August 2008, the president of Tirana, Refik Halili paid a total of €70,000 to buy Muzaka from their fierce rivals Partizani. He missed the opening two league matches due to injury, and returned in action in September, making his competitive debut against his former team Partizani in the Capital derby; he came as a second-half substitute in place of Sabjen Lilaj and assisted Andi Lila last-minute winner for a 2–1 win. He made his first start in the following week, playing for 52 minutes in another league win, this time against Apolonia Fier (2–0).

In his first season, Muzaka played 38 matches between league and cup. In championship, he made 29 appearances and scored two goals, helping Tirana to win its 24th championship in history. In cup, he scored once in nine appearances as Tirana was defeated in final by Flamurtari Vlorë.

Muzaka played his 200th match in Albanian Superliga on 30 October 2009 against Vllaznia Shkodër, marking off the occasion by scoring the match's only goal in the first half.

=== Dinamo Tirana ===
Muzaka signed a three-year contract with the 2009–10 champions Dinamo Tirana on 16 June 2010. The transfer was managed by the FIFA licensed agent Elton Marini, of 'M&M Management Agency'. The contact was worth a total of €210,000, with Muzaka earning €70,000 a season with Dinamo.

Muzaka was named in Dinamo UEFA Champions League squad, and made his competitive debut on 14 July 2010 in the first leg of second qualifying round against FC Sheriff Tiraspol ended in a 3–1 away defeat. Six days later, in the returning leg, despite losing his father and attending his funeral early that day, Muzaka decided to play and assisted Emiljano Vila's header via e set piece in an eventual 1–0 win which was not enough as Dinamo got eliminated 2–3 on aggregate. For this he received "Fair Play" Award at the end of the season by association "Sporti na Bashkon".

On 16 August, he started the domestic season in the Albanian Supercup against Besa Kavajë which finished in a 1–3 home defeat. His first league appearance came on 21 August in the opening league match against Flamurtari Vlorë which finished in a 0–1 home defeat. His maiden goal arrived on 13 November in the match against Skënderbeu Korçë, netting the opener in an eventual 3–2 away loss. During the first half of the season, Muzaka appeared on 15 matches, including 14 as starter, scoring once before going on loan at Skënderbeu Korçë for the rest of the season.

=== Skënderbeu Korçë ===
In January 2011. Muzaka joined a half-season loan at Skënderbeu Korçë. As part of the transfer, Serbian striker Mladen Brkić went to the opposite direction. He was presented and was given squad number 11, stating: "I'm at Skënderbeu to win the championship."

=== Flamurtari Vlorë ===
On 8 August 2012, Muzaka completed a transfer to fellow top flight side Flamurtari Vlorë for an undisclosed fee. Despite being the target of many Superliga teams, including his former side Tirana, Muzaka choose Flamurtari and signed a contract worth a reported fee €75,000 per season. He was presented one day later where took squad number 14, because number 17 was of Bruno Telushi.

During the 2012–13 season, Muzaka netted 18 goals across all competitions, setting a new personal best. He made 24 league appearances and scored 12 goals, with a ratio of one goal in two games. He was also named Albanian Superliga Player of the Month in March 2013. Muazaka was also an important instrument in the 2012–13 Albanian Cup, scoring 6 times in 9 matches as Flamurtari was eliminated in Group B.

=== Return to Skënderbeu Korçë ===
In August 2013, Muzaka joined Skënderbeu Korçë on a free transfer, returning in Korçë after one season absence. He signed a contract for the 2013–14 season with an option to renew and took his favourite squad number 17. In December 2013, Muzaka was a nominee for the Albanian Footballer of the Year award, which was subsequently won by Teuta Durrës' Daniel Xhafaj.

=== Return to Flamurtari Vlorë ===
After becoming a free agent following the expiration of his one-year contract with Skënderbeu Korçë, Muzaka re-joined Flamurtari Vlorë, where we had played between 2012 and 2013. He officially signed a two-year contract with Flamurtari on 10 June 2014. However, he left the club in January 2015 after a massive exodus, terminating his contract by mutual consent.

=== Return to Tirana ===
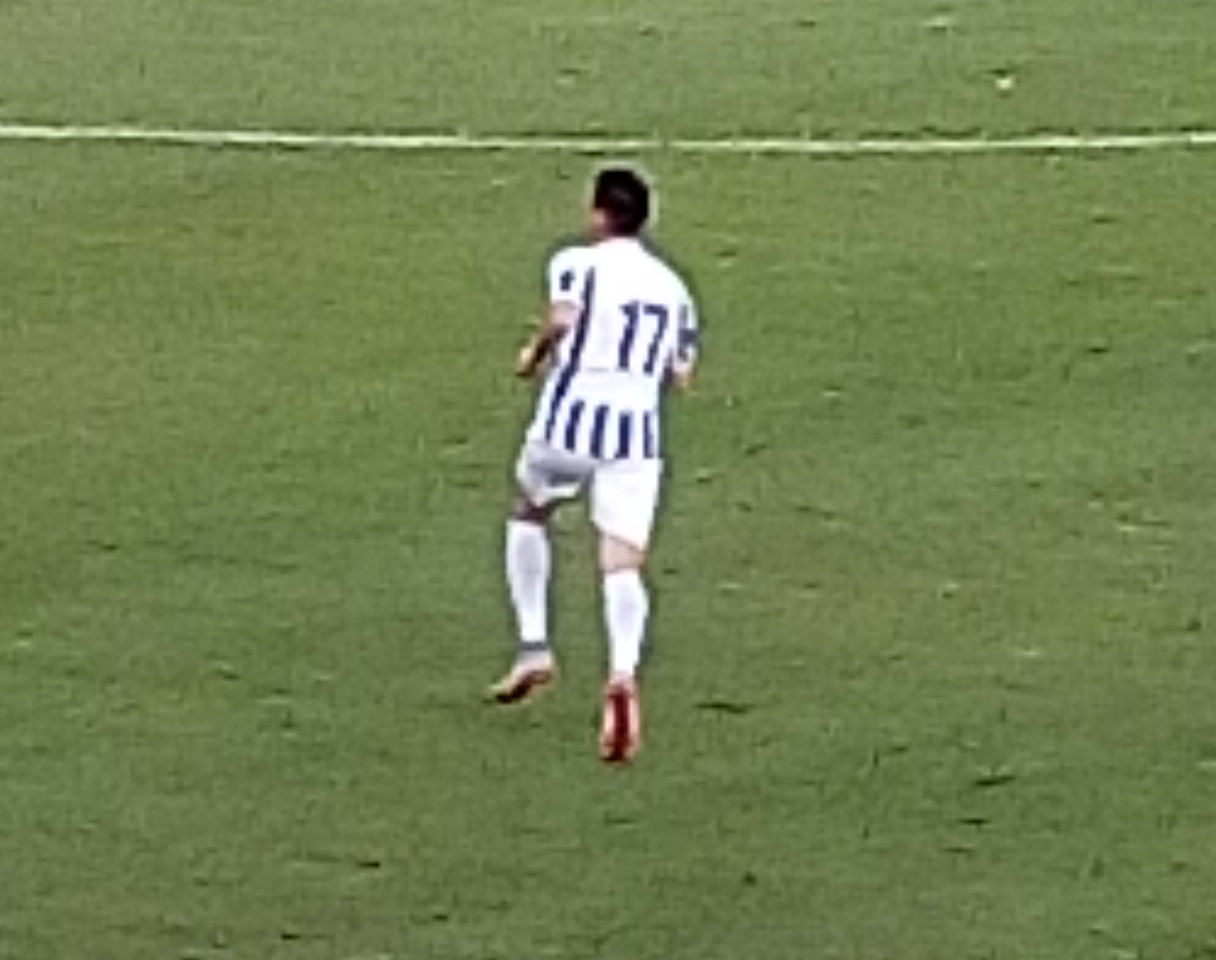
Muzaka in action during the 2015–16 season.

Muzaka left Flamurtari Vlorë during a mass exodus at the club in January 2015, after terminating his contract through mutual consent. He then returned to KF Tirana, signing a contract until the end of the 2014–15 campaign, reportedly worth €5,500 a month. On 7 January he was officially unveiled as a KF Tirana player to the media, holding a press conference alongside the club's president Refik Halili and newly appointed director Devi Muka.

He made his return debut on 24 January by playing full-90 minutes in the 2–0 home win against Apolonia Fier in the matchday 19. On 8 March 2015, during the league match against the title rivals Kukësi, Muzaka assisted the Tomislav Bušić goal in the 72nd minute, and scored himself six minutes later to seal the 2–0 win at neutral ground Niko Dovana Stadium.

On 22 April 2015, during the 2014–15 Albanian Cup semi-final second leg match against Laçi, Muzaka snapped his knee's ligament after a collision with Olsi Teqja and was stretchered off the field in the 46th minute. He underwent surgery on his knee on 11 May in Rome and was ruled out of action for 6 months. He finished second part of 2014–15 season by playing 15 matches between league and club, including 12 in league, scoring once in the process.

On 19 November 2015, Muzaka returned to pitch after about six months as he appeared in the last 15 minutes of the goalless draw against Laçi. He had to wait until 30 January of the following year to make his first start since the injury, as he played 75 minutes and scored a goal in the 1–3 away win at Tërbuni Pukë. He followed up the goal by scoring another one in the 3–0 win at Laçi, helping Tirana to win the first match at Laçi Stadium since 5 May 2012. Muzaka continued with his solid performances as he converted a penalty-kick in Tirana's 2–0 home defeat of Bylis Ballsh, helping Tirana to gain its first win at the newly renovated Selman Stërmasi Stadium. It was his third goal of the season in the last three matches.

On 17 April, during the league match at Bylis Ballsh, Muzaka suffered another injury, a shoulder fracture which forced him to end of the season with six weeks remaining. He finished the season by making 22 appearances, including 19 in league, and scoring four goals, and Tirana once again remained out of European competitions.

Following his shoulder injury, Muzaka returned in training in September 2016. He made his first appearance of the season in the second leg of Albanian Cup first round against Sopoti Librazhd, playing in the second half as Tirana recorded an empathic 7–0 home win, progressing to the next round with the aggregate 8–1. Later on 12 October, Muzaka made his first league appearance of the season in the matchday 6 against Korabi Peshkopi, scoring a 91st-minute winner with a diving header to give Tirana its second consecutive league win.

On 30 December 2016, Muzaka opened a file in the Conflict Resolution Room of AFA against Tirana for unpaid wages. Seven days later, he was told that he was not going to be part of the team for the preparation phase in Turkey. A live TV debat occurred between him and club president Halili where Muzaka claimed that the club owns him 107 million lek. He also added that Tirana owns him 14 monthly salary. On 23 January, Conflict Resolution Room upheld in part the appeal filed by the Muzaka and rejected the appeal filed by Tirana. Muzaka is yet to take his unpaid wages, but he did become a free agent while Tirana were forced to pay the court expenses which were €10,000.

=== Third spell at Skënderbeu Korçë ===
On 30 January 2017, Muzaka joined Skënderbeu Korçë on a free transfer for a third time, taking the vacant number 17 for the second part of 2016–17 season. During an interview, Muzaka said that he strongly considered to quit football, but Skënderbeu motivated him to change his mind. Manager Ilir Daja, who worked with him during his time at Tirana, called Muzaka a "valuable player", adding that "he has experience and speed". After two games as an unused substitute, Muzaka made his return debut on 19 February against Luftëtari Gjirokastër, scoring in the first half in an eventual 3–0 home win. It was his third Skënderbeu Korçë debut inaugurated with a goal. Muzaka made his 400th Albanian Superliga appearance on matchday 29 in Skënderbeu's 3–0 defeat of Korabi Peshkopi. On 6 May, Muzaka netted his third goal of the season, second for Skënderbeu, a 91st-minute equalizer in an eventual 4–3 home win against Vllaznia Shkodër. The match was heavily contested and was considered as fixed by Federbet, the anti match fixing organisation. On 31 May, he played in the Albanian Cup final against his former side Tirana in a 3–1 defeat at Elbasan Arena.

On 25 June, Muzaka extended his contract with the club for another season, lasting until June 2018. Two days later, he was named in Ilir Daja's team for the 2017–18 UEFA Europa League qualifying rounds. Muzaka played mostly as a substitute, collecting 7 appearances as Skënderbeu become the first Albanian club to pass four rounds. In the returning leg of second qualifying round against Kairat, Muzaka came off the bench and assisted Sebino Plaku's goal as the team progressed passed 3–1 on aggregate. He started the domestic season by scoring a brace in the first leg of 2017–18 Albanian Cup first round against Adriatiku Mamurras. Three days later, Skënderbeu opened the championship with a 2–0 home win over Flamurtari Vlorë, with Muzaka coming on again as a substitute to score the second. In Europa League, Skënderbeu was placed in Group B, and in the opening matchday away against Dynamo Kyiv, Muzaka scored his team's only goal after an individual effort in an eventual 1–3 defeat. His performances recently were praised by club president Ardjan Takaj, who said that Muzaka is an "example". Later on 9 February of the following year, Muzaka netted his 5th league goal, a late tap-in to seal a 1–0 home win over Flamurtari Vlorë which extended the league gap up to 11 points; it was Muzaka's third goal versus "The Red and Black Fleet" in the 2017–18 season. His 100th Albanian Superliga goal was scored on 14 April in form of an opener in the 3–2 win over Kamza. He concluded the 2017–18 season by contributing with 32 league appearances and scored 6 goals, his highest tally in five years, as Skënderbeu winning the championship for the 8th in history. In cup, he played 5 matches, including the final as the team defeated Laçi to clinch their first ever trophy, thus completing the domestic double for the first time in history.

In July 2018, after being linked with a possible transfer to Flamurtari Vlorë, Muzaka returned to the club and signed a contract for the next season. He began the 2018–19 season on 12 August by winning the 2018 Albanian Supercup against Laçi, netting a second-half penalty for a 3–2 win at Selman Stërmasi Stadium. Five days later, Muzaka was on the score-sheet again as he netted the first goal of 2018–19 Albanian Superliga season against Partizani Tirana; his goal was an injury-time winner with a penalty in a match which was infamously marred by crowd trouble. In October 2018, he was named Albanian Superliga Player of the Month after playing four matches and scoring the opener with a volley in the away match against Partizani Tirana; by doing so, he became the seventh player to win the award more than once and also the second to win it with two different clubs.

Muzaka signed a contract for the 2019–20 season, prolonging his Skënderbeu career up to eight seasons. He was also named the new team captain for the new season. On 5 October 2019, he was substituted by Otto John in a 2–0 home win over Luftëtari Gjirokastër after suffering a heavy injury in the second half; following the examinations, it was reported that Muzaka had completely tear the cruciate ligament of right knee, which left him sidelined for at least 6 months.

== International career ==
Muzaka was first approached to the national team in September 2002 for three 2003 UEFA European Under-19 Championship first qualifying round matches against Russia, France and Luxembourg. It was a start to forget for Muzaka, despite playing in all three matches as starter, as Albania lost all of them with hammering results and finished last in Group 9.

Some times later, Muzaka joined Albania under-21 squad in their 2004 UEFA European Under-21 Championship qualification campaign. He earned his first cap on 29 March 2003 in the 4–1 home defeat to Russia. Following that, he continued to play in every match as a starter and replacement and also scored his first goal in the last matchday against Georgia which paved way to a 3–0 win. The team concluded Group 10 in third place with 10 points from 8 matches.

Muzaka made his senior debut on 19 November 2008 in the friendly against Azerbaijan by appearing in the last moments of a 1–1 away draw. After appearing in numerous friendlies, Muzaka was called up by coach Josip Kuže for the first two UEFA Euro 2012 qualifying matches against Romania and Luxembourg in September 2010. His competitive debut occurred on 3 September away against Romania where he came on the field in the 81st minute, just one minute after Romania had taken the lead. He made an immediate impact and in the 87th minute he managed to find a head onto Ansi Agolli's free kick which he guided past the Romanian goalkeeper, which levelled the tie at 1–1 and earned Albania a very important and well-deserved point.

== Style of play ==
In his youth, Muzaka was noted for his speed, technique, ball control and dribbling skills, also earning comparisons to Cristiano Ronaldo.

Muzaka's natural position is right winger, but he also can play as an attacking midfielder. He is also known for his crossing and playmaking abilities but he is also an able goalscorer. From July 2017, under manager Ilir Daja at Skënderbeu Korçë, Muzaka begun utilised as a central midfielder.

He was named in coach Ernest Gjoka's greatest career XI, who described Muzaka as "an elegant, smart and energetic midfielder".

== Career statistics ==
=== Club ===
As of 16 December 2018

Appearances and goals by club, season and competition
Club	Season	League			Cup		Europe		Other		Total	
Club	Season	Division	Apps	Goals	Apps	Goals	Apps	Goals	Apps	Goals	Apps	Goals
Partizani Tirana	2001–02	Albanian Superliga	8	1	0	0	—		—		8	1
Partizani Tirana	2002–03	Albanian Superliga	18	4	0	0	2 (Note: Appearance(s) in UEFA Cup)	0	—		20	4
Partizani Tirana	2003–04	Albanian Superliga	33	10	0	0	—		—		33	10
Partizani Tirana	Total		59	15	0	0	2	0	—		61	15
Iraklis	2004–05	Alpha Ethniki	3	0	—		—		—		3	0
Partizani Tirana	2004–05	Albanian Superliga	11	2	0	0	—		—		11	2
Partizani Tirana	2005–06	Albanian Superliga	34	6	0	0	—		—		34	6
Partizani Tirana	2006–07	Albanian Superliga	29	5	0	0	—		—		29	5
Partizani Tirana	2007–08	Albanian Superliga	32	10	0	0	—		—		32	10
Partizani Tirana	2008–09	Albanian Superliga	—		—		2	1	—		2	1
Partizani Tirana	Total		106	23	0	0	2	1	—		108	24
Tirana	2008–09	Albanian Superliga	29	2	9	1	—		—		38	3
Tirana	2009–10	Albanian Superliga	30	10	2	0	1 (Note: Appearance(s) in UEFA Champions League)	0	—		33	10
Tirana	Total		59	12	11	1	1	0	—		71	13
Dinamo Tirana	2010–11	Albanian Superliga	15	1	0	0	2	0	1 (Note: Appearance in Albanian Supercup)	0	18	1
Skënderbeu Korçë	2010–11	Albanian Superliga	16	8	2	2	—		—		18	10
Skënderbeu Korçë	2011–12	Albanian Superliga	24	8	0	0	2	0	1	0	27	8
Skënderbeu Korçë	2012–13	Albanian Superliga	—		—		2	0	0	0	2	0
Skënderbeu Korçë	Total		40	16	2	2	4	0	1	0	45	18
Flamurtari Vlorë	2012–13	Albanian Superliga	24	12	9	6	—		—		33	18
Skënderbeu Korçë	2013–14	Albanian Superliga	31	4	6	1	2 (Note: Appearance(s) in UEFA Europa League)	0	1	0	40	5
Flamurtari Vlorë	2014–15	Albanian Superliga	17	3	0	0	4	0	1	0	22	3
Tirana	2014–15	Albanian Superliga	12	1	3	0	—		—		15	1
Tirana	2015–16	Albanian Superliga	19	4	3	0	—		—		22	4
Tirana	2016–17	Albanian Superliga	12	1	2	0	—		—		14	1
Tirana	Total		43	6	8	0	—		—		51	6
Skënderbeu Korçë	2016–17	Albanian Superliga	13	2	2	0	—		—		15	2
Skënderbeu Korçë	2017–18	Albanian Superliga	32	6	5	2	13	1	—		50	9
Skënderbeu Korçë	2018–19	Albanian Superliga	17	4	0	0	—		1	1	18	5
Skënderbeu Korçë	Total		62	12	7	2	13	1	1	1	83	16
Career total			459	104	44	12	30	2	5	1	538	119

=== International ===
As of match played 6 February 2013

Appearances and goals by national team and year
National team	Year	Apps	Goals
Albania	2008	1	0
Albania	2009	2	0
Albania	2010	8	1
Albania	2011	10	0
Albania	2012	1	0
Albania	2013	1	0
Total		23	1

As of match played 6 February 2013. Albania score listed first, score column indicates score after each Muzaka goal.

International goals by date, venue, cap, opponent, score, result and competition
No.	Date	Venue	Cap	Opponent	Score	Result	Competition
1	3 September 2010	Stadionul Ceahlăul, Piatra Neamţ, Romania	6	Romania	1–1	1–1	UEFA Euro 2012 qualifying

== Honours ==
Partizani Tirana

- Albanian Cup: 2003–04

Tirana

- Albanian Superliga: 2008–09
- Albanian Supercup: 2009

Skënderbeu Korçë

- Albanian Superliga: 2010–11. 2011–12, 2013–14, 2017–18
- Albanian Cup: 2017–18
- Albanian Supercup: 2013, 2018

Individual

- Albanian Superliga Fair Play Award: 2010–11
- Albanian Superliga Player of the Month: March 2013, October 2018
