= 2000–01 Albanian Cup =

Kupa e Shqipërisë

Tournament details
- Country: Albania

Final positions
- Champions: Tirana
- Runners-up: Teuta

2000–01 Albanian Cup (Albanian: Kupa e Shqipërisë) was the forty-ninth season of Albania's annual cup competition. It began on 26 August 2000 with the First Round and ended on 26 May 2001 with the Final match. The winners of the competition qualified for the 2001-02 first round of the UEFA Europa League. Teuta were the defending champions, having won their second Albanian Cup last season. The cup was won by Tirana.

The rounds were played in a two-legged format similar to those of European competitions. If the aggregated score was tied after both games, the team with the higher number of away goals advanced. If the number of away goals was equal in both games, the match was decided by extra time and a penalty shootout, if necessary.

== First round ==
Games were played on 26 August – 9 September 2000.

Team 1	Agg.	Team 2	1st leg	2nd leg
Kastrioti	0–11	Tirana	0–2	0–9
Tepelena	1–7	Bylis	0–2	1–5
Naftëtari	1–13	Teuta	0–5	1–8
Burreli	2–5	Vllaznia	1–3	1–2
Erzeni	1–5	Lushnja	0–2	1–3
Butrinti	1–8	Luftëtari	1–1	0–7
Ilir Viking	1–9	Dinamo Tirana	0–5	1–4
Laçi	0–9	Partizani	0–3	0–6
Korabi	1–5	Përparimi	1–1	0–4
Shkodra	3–10	Besëlidhja	1–5	2–5
Elbasani	4–2	Apolonia	2–0	2–2
Pogradeci	1–1 (a)	Besa	0–0	1–1
Gramozi	1–5	Skënderbeu	1–1	0–4
Albpetrol	0–4	Flamurtari	0–2	0–2
Sopoti	1–9	Shkumbini	1–3	0–6
Memaliaj	2–6	Tomori	0–1	2–6

== Second round ==
All sixteen teams of the 1999–00 Superliga and First Division entered in this round. First legs were played on 19 January 2001 and the second legs were played on 27 January 2001.

Team 1	Agg.	Team 2	1st leg	2nd leg
Lushnja	1–0	Dinamo Tirana	0–0	1–0
Përparimi	1–3	Skënderbeu	1–1	0–2
Pogradeci	1–4	Teuta	1–1	0–3
Bylis	2–1	Partizani	2–1	0–0
Flamurtari	3–4	Tomori	3–0	0–4
Luftëtari	1–2	Vllaznia	1–0	0–2 (w/o)
Elbasani	1–3	Shkumbini	1–1	0–2
Besëlidhja	0–7	Tirana	0–4	0–3

== Quarter-finals ==
In this round entered the 8 winners from the previous round.

Team 1	Agg.	Team 2	1st leg	2nd leg
Tirana	7–3	Shkumbini	4–1	3–2
Teuta	6–4	Lushnja	5–2	1–2
Skënderbeu	4–5	Tomori	3–2	1–3
Vllaznia	3–2	Bylis	3–0	0–2

== Semi-finals ==
In this round entered the four winners from the previous round.

Team 1	Agg.	Team 2	1st leg	2nd leg
Tomori	1–5	Tirana	0–1	1–4
Vllaznia	2–4	Teuta	1–2	1–2

18 April 2001	Tomori	0–1	Tirana	Tomori Stadium, Berat
			Aliaj 90' (o.g.)

2 May 2001	Tirana	4–1	Tomori	Selman Stermasi Stadium, Tirana
	Fortuzi 7' (pen.), 34'; Mema 17'; Kenesei 43'		Gjata 73' (pen.)

Tirana advanced to the final.

18 April 2001	Vllaznia	1–2	Teuta	Loro Boriçi Stadium, Shkodër
	Liçi 65'		Rexhepi 1'; Kodra 64'

2 May 2001	Teuta	2–1	Vllaznia	Niko Dovana Stadium, Durrës
	Shtrepi 11'; Kote 66'		Osmani 76' (pen.)

Teuta advanced to the final.

== Final ==
26 May 2001
19:00

Tirana	5–0	Teuta
Halili 5', 15', 51'; Dede 24' (pen.); Prenga 61'

Qemal Stafa Stadium, Tirana
Attendance: 4,000
Referee: Sokol Jareci
