= Kategoria Superiore Fair Play Award =

Albanian football award

The Kategoria Superiore Fair Play Award is an annual award in Albania given to the most fair play player of the Kategoria Superiore by association "Sporti Na Bashkon". This award was established in the 2009–10 season.

== Winners ==
Year	Player	Club	Ref
2009–10	Orges Shehi	(Albania) Besa Kavajë	
2010–11	Gjergji Muzaka	(Albania) Dinamo Tirana	
2011–12	Bledi Shkëmbi	(Albania) Skënderbeu Korçë	
2012–13	Igli Allmuça	(Albania) Kukësi	
2013–14	Ilion Lika	(Albania) Tirana	
2014–15	Orges Shehi	(Albania) Skënderbeu Korçë	
2015–16	Sabien Lilaj	(Albania) Skënderbeu Korçë	
2016–17	Rrahman Hallaçi	(Albania) Kukësi	

== Number of awards per player ==
Player	Number	Years
Orges Shehi	2	2009–10, 2014–2015
Gjergji Muzaka	1	2010–11
Bledi Shkëmbi	1	2011–12
Igli Allmuça	1	2012–13
Ilion Lika	1	2013–14
Sabien Lilaj	1	2015–16
Rrahman Hallaçi	1	2016–17

== See also ==
- Kategoria Superiore Player of the Month
