= Niko Dovana =

Albanian footballer (died 1949)

Personal information
- Full name: Niko Dovana
- Date of death: 1949
- Position: Goalkeeper

Senior career*
| Years | Team | Apps | (Gls) |
| 1930–194? | Teuta Durrës | | (1) |
- * Club domestic league appearances and goals

Niko Dovana was a former Albanian football player who played for Teuta Durrës during the 1930s and 1940s. He is considered one of Teuta Durrës's most important players and was the main financier of the club until his death in 1949.

The club's stadium was renamed to the Niko Dovana Stadium in the early 1990s in honour of the goalkeeper. He lived in Milan, Italy for the latter stages of his life where he was a prominent trader.

== Personal life ==
He was born in Durrës as the eldest of five children to Vlash and Mellani Dovana (née Terka). His father Vlash was a trader who along with Niko's uncle Laz owned the Dovana Brothers trading company. His mother was born into a prominent family in Durrës and her father Pavlo Terka was the Minister of Foreign Affairs of Albania between 1914 and 1916. His only brother Alfons was a poet and writer, whose main area of expertise was the reform of the Albanian language.

== Club career ==
Dovana was an integral part of Teuta's early history as he was a key player and financier, helping the club reach the championship playoff finals in 1931 and remain in the top tier division throughout the 1930s. At the time of his playing career he was living in Milan, Italy where he was working as a trader, and he would travel to Albania during the playing season to live and play there for Teuta. He is regarded as one of Teuta's best ever goalkeepers and one of their most important ever figures and he is also remembered for his goal against SK Tirana in the first tie of the championship playoff on 29 June 1931. His side were losing the game 1-0 when Dovana instructed one of the forwards to cover for him in goal as he went to play as a forward, and with a shot on goal he scored and equalised, which led to mass media coverage, with many Albanian football fans fascinated by the sight of the goalkeeper playing as a forward and scoring. SK Tirana complained to the Albanian Football Association on the grounds that a registered goalkeeper cannot play as an outfield player, but these complaints were not heard and SK Tirana went on to win the second leg of the tie 0–3 in Durrës and win their second consecutive championship.
