= 2003–04 Albanian Cup =

Kupa e Shqipërisë

Tournament details
- Country: Albania
- Teams: 44

Final positions
- Champions: Partizani
- Runners-up: Dinamo Tirana

Tournament statistics
- Matches played: 105
- Goals scored: 367 (3.5 per match)
- Top goal scorer: Vioresin Sinani (7 goals)

2003–04 Albanian Cup (Albanian: Kupa e Shqipërisë) was the fifty-second season of Albania's annual cup competition. It began on 29 August 2003 with the preliminary round and ended on 19 May 2004 with the Final match. The winners of the competition qualified for the 2004–05 first qualifying round of the UEFA Europa League. Dinamo Tirana were the defending champions, having won their thirteenth Albanian Cup last season. The cup was won by Partizani.

The rounds were played in a two-legged format similar to those of European competitions. If the aggregated score was tied after both games, the team with the higher number of away goals advanced. If the number of away goals was equal in both games, the match was decided by extra time and a penalty shootout, if necessary.

== Preliminary round ==
Games were played on 29 August – 4 September 2003.

Team 1	Agg.	Team 2	1st leg	2nd leg
Fushë Mbreti	3–0	Sopoti	2–0	1–0
Maliqi	2–4	Pogradeci	1–2	1–2
Domozdova	1–15	Egnatia	1–4	0–11
Kukësi	1–8	Laçi	1–3	0–5
Albania FK	6–6 (a)	Ada	4–3	2–3
Nacional	3–1	Iliria	2–1	1–0
Burreli	0–2	Dajti	0–1	0–1
Korabi	0–4 (w/o)	Veleçiku	0–2 (w/o)	0–2 (w/o)
Gramshi	3–7	Cërriku	2–2	1–5
Butrinti	1–6	Luftëtari	0–1	1–5
Poliçani	2–6	Albpetrol	2–2	0–4
Rrësheni	1–10	Kastrioti	1–4	0–6
Çakrani	3–7	Apolonia	1–4	2–3
Melesini	1–5	Devolli	1–3	0–2 (w/o)
Gramozi	1–5	Skënderbeu	0–0	1–5
Tepelena	4–7	Delvina	3–2	1–5
Përmeti	1–6	Bylis	1–4	0–2
Këlcyra	2–2 (2–4 p)	Memaliaj	2–0	0–2
Çlirimi	2–0	Erzeni	2–0	0–0
Frakulla	0–4 (w/o)	Naftëtari	0–2 (w/o)	0–2 (w/o)
Suçi	0–5	Besëlidhja	0–5	0–0
Skrapari	0–6	Tomori	0–4	0–2

== First round ==
All fourteen teams of the 2002–03 Superliga and First Division entered in this round, along with Preliminary Round winners. Games were played on 17 September – 1 October 2003.

Team 1	Agg.	Team 2	1st leg	2nd leg
Cërriku	2–8	Tirana	0–3	2–5
Ada	0–11	Vllaznia	0–2	0–9
Fushë Mbreti	2–14	Partizani	2–8	0–6
Egnatia	0–1	Teuta	0–1	0–0
Skënderbeu	2–5	Shkumbini	1–1	1–4
Pogradeci	1–2	Dinamo Tirana	1–1	0–1
Albpetrol	3–2	Flamurtari	0–2	3–0
Devolli	3–9	Elbasani	1–1	2–8
Naftëtari	2–4	Besa	2–2	0–2
Memaliaj	0–13	Lushnja	0–3	0–10
Delvina	5–6	Apolonia	5–0	0–6
Tomori	2–1	Çlirimi	1–0	1–1
Luftëtari	2–4	Bylis	2–0	0–4
Dajti	3–2	Veleçiku	2–0	1–2
Kastrioti	3–2	Besëlidhja	2–1	1–1
Nacional	2–3	Laçi	2–0	0–3

== Second round ==
First legs were played on 12 November 2003 and the second legs were played on 26 November 2003.

Team 1	Agg.	Team 2	1st leg	2nd leg
Bylis	2–4	Shkumbini	2–0	0–4
Albpetrol	3–4	Elbasani	1–1	2–3
Kastrioti	2–8	Partizani	1–2	1–6
Laçi	3–6	Dinamo Tirana	1–2	2–4
Lushnja	0–3	Tirana	0–1	0–2
Tomori	1–3	Besa	1–2	0–1
Dajti	3–7	Teuta	3–3	0–4
Apolonia	2–11	Vllaznia	2–4	0–7

== Quarter-finals ==
In this round entered the 8 winners from the previous round.

Team 1	Agg.	Team 2	1st leg	2nd leg
Dinamo Tirana	4–3	Teuta	2–1	2–2
Elbasani	1–2	Partizani	0–0	1–2
Shkumbini	1–2	Vllaznia	1–0	0–2
Besa	2–5	Tirana	1–3	1–2

== Semi-finals ==
In this round entered the four winners from the previous round.

Team 1	Agg.	Team 2	1st leg	2nd leg
Dinamo Tirana	5–2	Tirana	3–1	2–1
Vllaznia	0–5	Partizani	0–2	0–3

7 April 2004	Dinamo Tirana	3–1	Tirana	Qemal Stafa Stadium, Tirana
	Keita 47'; Leandro 87'; Zyambo 89'		Xhafa 48'

21 April 2004	Tirana	1–2	Dinamo Tirana	Selman Stermasi Stadium, Tirana
	Qorri 88'		Sina 28'; Leandro 68'

Dinamo Tirana advanced to the final.

7 April 2004	Vllaznia	0–2	Partizani	Loro Boriçi Stadium, Shkodër
			Abílio 45+2'; Bylykbashi 67'

22 April 2004	Partizani	3–0	Vllaznia	Qemal Stafa Stadium, Tirana
	Abílio 15'; Ahmataj 45'; Muzaka 53'

Partizani advanced to the final.

== Final ==
19 May 2004
18:00

Dinamo Tirana	0–1	Partizani
		Ndreka 12'

Qemal Stafa Stadium, Tirana
Attendance: 10,500
Referee: Artan Taullai
