= Nevil Dede =

Albanian footballer (born 1975)

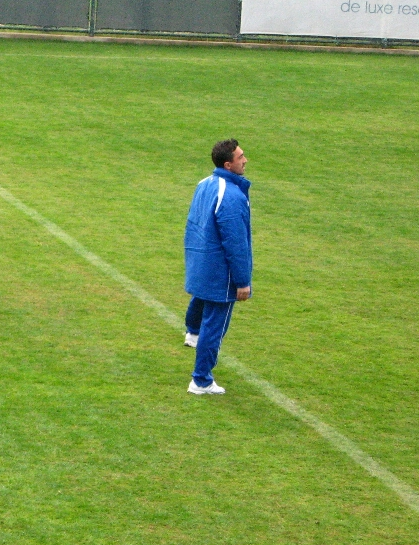
- Dede as Tirana coach

Personal information
- Full name: Nevil Thanas Dede
- Date of birth: 10 January 1975 (age 51)
- Place of birth: Tirana, Albania
- Height: 1.84 m (6 ft 0 in)
- Position: Centre-back

Team information
- Current team: Egnatia (manager)

Senior career*
Years	Team	Apps	(Gls)
1994–2004	Tirana	255	(24)
2004-2006	Elbasani	68	(11)
2006–2007	Tirana	44	(6)
2008	Changsha	25	(0)
2008–2009	Elbasani	8	(0)
2009	Tirana	0	(0)
Total		400	(41)

International career
1995–2007	Albania	30	(0)

Managerial career
- 2009–2010: Skënderbeu (assistant manager)
- 2010–2011: Tirana
- 2011: Laçi
- 2012: Luftëtari
- 2013: Tirana
- 2014: Kastrioti
- 2015–2018: Albania W U19
- 2018: Erzeni
- 2019−2020: Albania U19
- 2020−2021: Tirana
- 2021−2022: Erzeni
- 2022−2023: Dinamo Tirana
- 2023−2024: Elbasani
- 2024−2025: Bylis
- 2025−2026: Ferizaj
- 2026−: Egnatia
- * Club domestic league appearances and goals

Nevil Thanas Dede (born 10 January 1975) is an Albanian professional football coach and former player. He is the current manager of Egnatia in the Kategoria Superiore.

A centre-back, Dede spent most of his club career with his hometown club Tirana, winning a string of trophies, including 8 championships, being one of the most decorated players.

Dede has also been an Albanian international, representing Albania in 30 matches. He was also named Albanian Footballer of the Year in 2006.

After retiring early on in the 2009–10 season, Dede was appointed assistant manager of Tirana. Since then, Dede did not settle any teams, managing in quick succession Laçi, Tirana once again, Luftëtari and Kastrioti and Albania U19 women where he was the inaugural head coach. In 2018, after one year four years without managing a club, he was named new manager of Dinamo Tirana.

== Club career ==
He has played for KF Tirana since 1994 until 2008, except for the years 2004–2006 when he played for Elbasani. Dede also had a short spell in China in 2008 with Changsha.

Dede was one of the most important individuals in the Elbasani squad that clinched Albanian Superliga title in the 2005–06 season. He played 33 matches and scored 5 goals, and was rewarded with Albanian Footballer of the Year award for his performances.

Dede announced his retirement from the sport in September 2009 due to injuries.

== International career ==
Dede made his debut for the Albania national team in 1995, and has been capped 30 times.

== Managerial career ==
=== Tirana ===
In October 2009, after retiring in the previous month, Dede was appointed assistant manager of Alban Tafaj at Tirana. His spell was short-lived however, as he left the club in February of the following year after falling out with Tafaj.

=== Tirana return ===
On 10 October 2010, Dede was renamed manager of Tirana for the remainder of the season, replacing the departed Sulejman Starova. He was presented to the media in the next day.

=== Erzeni ===
On 10 January 2018, Dede was named the manager of Kategoria e Parë side Erzeni; he was presented on the same day. However, after less than two weeks, Dede announced to have left the team, citing the distant distance from Tirana as the main reason.

=== Bylis ===
On 25 September 2024 Dede was appointed as the head coach of the KF Bylis.

=== Ferizaj ===
Dede was named manager of Kosovar club FC Ferizaj on 3 October 2025.. He was fired on 19 April 2026.

=== Egnatia ===
On 4 May 2026, Dede was appointed as the head coach of Egnatia. He won all three games in the Final Four and was crowned champion of the Albanian Super League.

After defeating Petrocub Hîncești and Shamrock Rovers, Egnatia secured their first participation in the group stage of a European competition. They missed on the League Phase of the 2026-27 UEFA Europa League after losing in the extra time against Lillestrøm SK but qualified for the 2026-27 UEFA Conference League.

== Career statistics ==
=== Club ===
Club	Season	League		
Club	Season	Division	Apps	Goals
KF Tirana	1992–93	Kategoria Superiore	21	0
KF Tirana	1993–94	Kategoria Superiore	20	0
KF Tirana	1994–95	Kategoria Superiore	25	1
KF Tirana	1995–96	Kategoria Superiore	30	5
KF Tirana	1996–97	Kategoria Superiore	14	2
KF Tirana	1997–98	Kategoria Superiore	25	1
KF Tirana	1998–99	Kategoria Superiore	11	0
KF Tirana	1999–00	Kategoria Superiore	24	5
KF Tirana	2000–01	Kategoria Superiore	25	6
KF Tirana	2001–02	Kategoria Superiore	22	2
KF Tirana	2002–03	Kategoria Superiore	10	0
KF Tirana	2003–04	Kategoria Superiore	28	2
KF Elbasani	2005–06	Kategoria Superiore	33	5
KF Elbasani	2004–05	Kategoria Superiore	35	6
KF Tirana	2006–07	Kategoria Superiore	30	5
KF Tirana	2007–08	Kategoria Superiore	0	0

=== International ===
Albania national team
Year	Apps	Goals
1995	1	0
1996	3	0
1997	0	0
1998	0	0
1999	0	0
2000	1	0
2001	2	0
2002	5	0
2003	5	0
2004	1	0
2005	0	0
2006	1	0
2007	11	0
Total	30	0

== Honours ==
Tirana

- Kategoria Superiore:(8) 1994–95, 1995–96, 1996–97, 1998–99, 1999–2000, 2002–03, 2003–04, 2006–07
- Albanian Cup:(5) 1993–94, 1995–96, 1998–99, 2000–01, 2001–02
- Albanian Supercup:(6) 1994, 2000, 2002, 2003, 2006, 2009

Elbasani

- Kategoria Superiore: 2005–06

Individual

- Albanian Footballer of the Year: 2006

=== Manager ===
Egnatia

- Kategoria Superiore: 2025–26
