= 2002–03 Albanian National Championship =

Albanian National Championship
- Season: 2002–03
- Dates: 21 September 2002 – 24 May 2003
- Champions: Tirana; 20th Albanian title
- Relegated: Apolonia; Erzeni; Bylis; Besëlidhja
- Champions League: Tirana
- UEFA Cup: Vllaznia; Dinamo Tirana
- Intertoto Cup: Partizani
- Matches: 182
- Goals: 446 (2.45 per match)
- Top goalscorer: Mahir Halili (20 goals)

The 2002–03 Albanian National Championship was the 64th season of the Albanian National Championship, the top professional league for association football clubs, since its establishment in 1930.

== Teams ==
=== Stadia and last season ===
Locations of the 2002–03 Albanian National Championship teams

| Team | Location | Stadium | Capacity | Last season |
|---|---|---|---|---|
| Apolonia | Fier | Loni Papuçiu Stadium | 10,000 | 9th |
| Besa | Kavajë | Besa Stadium | 8,000 | Kategoria e Dytë |
| Besëlidhja | Lezhë | Brian Filipi Stadium | 5,000 | 10th |
| Bylis | Ballsh | Adush Muça Stadium | 6,000 | 11th |
| Dinamo Tirana | Tirana | Qemal Stafa Stadium (Note: Dinamo Tirana, Partizani and Tirana all shared the Qemal Stafa Stadium as well as the Selman Stërmasi Stadium.) | 19,700 | Champions |
| Elbasani | Elbasan | Ruzhdi Bizhuta Stadium | 15,000 | Kategoria e Dytë |
| Erzeni | Shijak | Tefik Jashari Stadium | 4,000 | 12th |
| Flamurtari | Vlorë | Flamurtari Stadium | 15,000 | 8th |
| Lushnja | Lushnjë | Abdurrahman Roza Haxhiu Stadium | 12,000 | 7th |
| Partizani | Tirana | Qemal Stafa Stadium | 19,700 | 3rd |
| Shkumbini | Peqin | Shkumbini Stadium | 6,000 | 6th |
| Teuta | Durrës | Niko Dovana Stadium | 12,040 | 4th |
| Tirana | Tirana | Qemal Stafa Stadium | 19,700 | 2nd |
| Vllaznia | Shkodër | Loro Boriçi Stadium | 15,000 | 5th |

== League table ==
| Pos | Team | Pld | W | D | L | GF | GA | GD | Pts | Qualification or relegation |
|---|---|---|---|---|---|---|---|---|---|---|
| 1 | Tirana (C) | 26 | 19 | 3 | 4 | 57 | 18 | +39 | 60 | Qualification for the Champions League first qualifying round |
| 2 | Vllaznia | 26 | 15 | 4 | 7 | 51 | 32 | +19 | 49 | Qualification for the UEFA Cup qualifying round |
| 3 | Partizani | 26 | 12 | 10 | 4 | 41 | 27 | +14 | 46 | Qualification for the Intertoto Cup first round |
| 4 | Teuta | 26 | 12 | 4 | 10 | 38 | 27 | +11 | 40 | |
| 5 | Shkumbini | 26 | 11 | 7 | 8 | 33 | 23 | +10 | 40 | |
| 6 | Dinamo Tirana | 26 | 10 | 8 | 8 | 29 | 24 | +5 | 38 | Qualification for the UEFA Cup qualifying round (Note: Dinamo Tirana qualified for the UEFA Cup qualifying round by winning the 2002–03 Albanian Cup.) |
| 7 | Flamurtari | 26 | 10 | 6 | 10 | 27 | 28 | −1 | 36 | |
| 8 | Elbasani | 26 | 10 | 6 | 10 | 33 | 35 | −2 | 36 | |
| 9 | Besa | 26 | 9 | 9 | 8 | 29 | 37 | −8 | 36 | |
| 10 | Lushnja | 26 | 9 | 8 | 9 | 27 | 27 | 0 | 35 | |
| 11 | Apolonia (R) | 26 | 10 | 5 | 11 | 27 | 33 | −6 | 35 | Relegation to the 2003–04 Kategoria e Parë (Note: Lushnja and Apolonia finished the season level on points so the Albanian Football Association decided to organise a playoff game to determine which side will be relegated to the Kategoria e Parë.) |
| 12 | Erzeni (R) | 26 | 6 | 6 | 14 | 23 | 37 | −14 | 24 | Relegation to the 2003–04 Kategoria e Parë |
| 13 | Bylis (R) | 26 | 3 | 7 | 16 | 19 | 61 | −42 | 16 | Relegation to the 2003–04 Kategoria e Parë |
| 14 | Besëlidhja (R) | 26 | 4 | 1 | 21 | 22 | 47 | −25 | 13 | Relegation to the 2003–04 Kategoria e Parë |

Source: Albanian Football Association (in Albanian), RSSSF.org
Rules for classification: 1) points; 2) points in head-to-head matches; 3) goal difference in head-to-head matches; 4) goals scored in head-to-head matches; 5) total goal difference; 6) total goals scored; 7) draw
(C) Champions; (R) Relegated

== Results ==
| Home \ Away | APO | BYL | BES | BSL | DIN | ELB | ERZ | FLA | LUS | PAR | SKU | TEU | TIR | VLL |
|---|---|---|---|---|---|---|---|---|---|---|---|---|---|---|
| Apolonia | | 1–2 | 2–0 | 1–0 | 1–0 | 4–2 | 2–1 | 1–2 | 1–0 | 2–0 | 0–0 | 2–0 | 0–2 | 1–1 |
| Bylis | 0–3 | | 1–1 | 2–0 | 2–5 | 1–0 | 1–1 | 0–0 | 1–3 | 0–1 | 0–4 | 1–1 | 0–4 | 0–5 |
| Besa | 1–1 | 0–0 | | 1–0 | 1–0 | 1–1 | 0–0 | 2–0 | 1–1 | 2–2 | 0–0 | 2–1 | 0–0 | 1–0 |
| Besëlidhja | 2–0 | 2–0 | 0–3 | | 0–1 | 1–2 | 5–2 | 0–2 | 0–1 | 1–2 | 2–0 | 0–1 | 1–2 | 0–3 |
| Dinamo | 1–1 | 2–1 | 2–0 | 2–0 | | 2–0 | 2–1 | 2–0 | 1–0 | 0–0 | 0–0 | 2–1 | 2–3 | 1–2 |
| Elbasani | 0–0 | 6–1 | 2–1 | 2–0 | 0–0 | | 1–0 | 1–0 | 2–1 | 2–2 | 0–1 | 1–0 | 2–1 | 3–3 |
| Erzeni | 2–0 | 2–1 | 1–2 | 3–0 | 1–0 | 1–1 | | 2–0 | 0–0 | 1–2 | 0–0 | 2–0 | 1–4 | 0–1 |
| Flamurtari | 1–0 | 4–1 | 0–1 | 2–2 | 1–1 | 3–0 | 2–1 | | 0–0 | 0–0 | 1–0 | 1–0 | 0–1 | 1–0 |
| Lushnja | 1–0 | 1–1 | 3–1 | 2–1 | 2–0 | 3–0 | 1–0 | 1–1 | | 2–2 | 1–2 | 0–0 | 1–1 | 0–1 |
| Partizani | 5–0 | 1–0 | 4–5 | 2–0 | 0–0 | 3–1 | 0–0 | 3–2 | 3–1 | | 0–2 | 0–0 | 1–3 | 3–1 |
| Shkumbini | 3–0 | 1–1 | 2–1 | 2–1 | 1–1 | 2–0 | 1–0 | 4–1 | 3–0 | 1–1 | | 1–3 | 0–1 | 1–3 |
| Teuta | 3–1 | 4–0 | 5–0 | 2–1 | 2–0 | 1–3 | 3–0 | 3–1 | 2–1 | 1–2 | 2–1 | | 0–0 | 2–1 |
| Tirana | 2–0 | 6–1 | 5–0 | 4–1 | 3–1 | 1–0 | 3–0 | 1–2 | 0–1 | 0–2 | 2–0 | 2–0 | | 2–0 |
| Vllaznia | 2–3 | 3–1 | 4–2 | 3–2 | 1–1 | 2–1 | 5–1 | 1–0 | 3–0 | 0–0 | 2–1 | 2–1 | 2–4 | |

Source: Albanian Football Association
Legend: Blue = home team win; Yellow = draw; Red = away team win.

== Playoffs ==
=== Relegation playoff ===
28 May 2003

| Lushnja | 3–1 | Apolonia |
|---|---|---|
| Çela 52'; Kadiu 61' (pen.), 66' | | Shala 70' |

Qemal Stafa Stadium, Tirana
Attendance: 7,000
Referee: Pasquale Rodomonti (Italy)

== Season statistics ==
=== Top goalscorers ===
| Rank | Player | Club | Goals |
|---|---|---|---|
| 1 | (Albania) Mahir Halili | Tirana | 20 |
| 2 | (Albania) Vioresin Sinani | Vllaznia | 17 |
| 3 | (Albania) Dorian Bubeqi | Shkumbini | 10 |
| 3 | (Albania) Bledar Mançaku | Partizani | 10 |
| 5 | (Albania) Sokol Ishka | Vllaznia | 9 |
| 6 | (Zambia) January Zyambo | Dinamo Tirana/Bylis | 8 |
| 6 | (Albania) Gentian Stojku | Elbasani | 8 |
| 6 | (Albania) Devi Muka | Tirana | 8 |
| 6 | (Albania) Dorian Bylykbashi | Elbasani | 8 |
| 6 | (Albania) Artan Karapici | Erzeni | 8 |
| 6 | (Albania) Skerdi Bejzade | Vllaznia | 8 |
| 6 | (Albania) Migen Memelli | Teuta | 8 |
| 6 | (Albania) Kreshnik Ivanaj | Besëlidhja | 8 |
