= Mahir Halili =

Albanian footballer (born 1975)

Personal information
- Full name: Mahir Halili
- Date of birth: 30 June 1975 (age 51)
- Place of birth: Dibër, Albania
- Position: Midfielder

Senior career*
Years	Team	Apps	(Gls)
1995–1996	Kastrioti	15	(4)
1996–1997	Dinamo Tirana	16	(2)
1997–1998	Delémont		
1998–2000	FC HIT	28	(4)
2000–2005	Tirana	133	(46)
2005–2006	Partizani	26	(3)

International career
1996–1999	Albania	13	(1)
- * Club domestic league appearances and goals

Mahir Halili (born 30 June 1975) is an Albanian retired footballer. He played for Tirana, Dinamo Tirana, Kastrioti Krujë and his last team Partizani Tirana. He also played abroad in Switzerland with SR Delémont in the 1997–98 season and in Slovenia with ND Gorica where he played for two seasons from 1998 to 2000. He was also a member of the Albania national team from 1996 to 1999.

== Club career ==
=== Tirana ===
On 10 May 2003, Halili scored four goals in a 6–1 home win against Bylis Ballsh. Tirana ended the 2002–03 in the first place, 11 points above Vllaznia Shkodër. In personal terms, Halili ended the season with 20 league goals, beating out his rival Vioresin Sinani.

== International career ==
Halili made his international debut on 24 April 1996 against Bosnia and Herzegovina in its second international recognized match, coming on as an 80th-minute substitute in a goalless draw. He scored his first goal on 21 January 1998 in his fourth international appearance in the historical 4–1 friendly victory over Turkey; he scored in under a minute after being put on as a substitute for Arjan Peço. He earned a total of 13 caps, scoring 1 goal. His final international was an August 1999 European Championship qualification match against Slovenia.

== Honours ==
=== Club ===
Tirana

- Albanian Cup (2): 2000–01, 2001–02
- Albanian Superliga (3): 2002–03, 2003–04, 2004–05
