= Sokol Bulku =

Albanian footballer

Personal information
- Full name: Sokol Bulku
- Date of birth: 6 January 1978 (age 48)
- Place of birth: Tirana, Albania
- Position: Midfielder

Senior career*
Years	Team	Apps	(Gls)
1995–2004	Tirana	131+	(3+)
2004–2007	Partizani	33	(4)
2007	Elbasani	15	(0)
2008	Kastrioti	14	(0)

International career
1997–1998	Albania U21	5	(0)

Managerial career
- 2011–2013: Tirana (assistant)
- 2013: Tirana (interim)
- 2017–: KF Tirana U-19
- * Club domestic league appearances and goals

Sokol Bulku (born 6 January 1978) is an Albanian retired footballer who played the majority of his career with KF Tirana, also having stints at Partizani Tirana, KF Elbasani and Kastrioti Krujë.

== Managerial career ==
He was the assistant manager of KF Tirana between 2011 and 2013, as well as the interim manager in November 2013.

== Personal life ==
His younger brother is Albanian international Ervin Bulku, whom he played with at KF Tirana between 1998 and 2004.

== Honours ==
KF Tirana

- Albanian Superliga (5): 1996–97, 1998–99, 1999–2000, 2002–03, 2003–04
- Albanian Cup (4): 1995–96, 1998–99, 2000–01, 2001–02
- Albanian Supercup (3): 2000, 2002, 2003

Partizani

- Albanian Supercup (1): 2004
