= Devi Muka =

Albanian footballer

Personal information
- Full name: Devis Mukaj
- Date of birth: 21 December 1976 (age 49)
- Place of birth: Vlore, Albania
- Height: 1.82 m (6 ft 0 in)
- Position: Midfielder

Senior career*
Years	Team	Apps	(Gls)
1994–1997	Flamurtari	80	(9)
1998	Partizani	29	(8)
1999	Tirana	23	(9)
2000–2002	NK Varteks	66	(4)
2003–2010	Tirana	178	(53)

International career
	Albania U21	6	(0)
1998–2007	Albania	39	(1)

Managerial career
- 2010: KF Tirana (player-manager)
- * Club domestic league appearances and goals

Devi Muka (born 21 December 1976) is an Albanian retired footballer who spent the majority of his career playing for KF Tirana in the Albanian Superliga as a midfielder.

== Club career ==
=== Early career and Croatia ===
Born in Vlorë, Muka started his career in 1993 with hometown club, Flamurtari Vlorë. He played for them until 1997 when he transferred to Partizani Tirana. He had played 77 league games at Flamurtari Vlorë and had scored 9 goals before leaving. At Partizani Tirana he made 28 appearances and scored 8 goals, and he subsequently moved to play for SK Tirana. In his first season with SK Tirana he played 23 times and scored 9 goals. He then moved to NK Varteks in Croatia, and after 3 years and 66 league games Muka moved back to Albania. He scored 4 goals during his time in Croatia.

=== Return to Albania ===
Muka returned to Albania in 2002 with SK Tirana. He played 23 games and scored 3 goals during the campaign, he scored against former club NK Varteks in the UEFA Champions League.Muka suffered an injury during the 2007–08 season that limited him to just 3 league games all season. In the 2008–09 season Muka did not play until October. He made his season debut on 19 October 2008 against bitter rivals, Dinamo Tirana when he came on for goalscorer Migen Memelli in the 72nd minute. Overall during the 2008–09 season he played 14 games and scored 3 goals, all 3 of them were scored at home at the Selman Stërmasi stadium. Muka once again lifted the trophy at the end of the season following a 2–1 win over title rivals Vllaznia Shkodër.

== International career ==
Muka made his Albania National Team debut in a friendly against Cyprus on 19 August 1998. He came on for goalscorer Alban Bushi in the 76th minute of the game. The match resulted in a 3–2 loss for Albania. Muka was 21 when he made his debut. Muka's first and only international goal came on 4 September 1999 Euro 2000 Qualifying match against Latvia. He came off the bench on the 78th minute replacing Igli Tare. His goal came in the 91st minute of the game which secured a point for Albania. He was recalled to the squad when Otto Baric took charge of Albania after having a year gap with no international involvement. Muka last played for the national team on 17 October 2007 in a Euro 2008 Qualifying match against Bulgaria. He replaced Altin Haxhi at half time. The match ended in a 1–1 draw after Ervin Skela missed from the penalty spot on the 90th minute. In total Muka made 40 appearances for the Albania National Team and scored one goal from 1998 to 2007.

== Managerial career ==
Muka was immediately named as manager of KF Tirana following the departure of Nevil Dede after just two games in charge. The attacking midfielder was still eligible to play for the club and this meant that he became the first Player Manager in the 2009-10 Albanian Superliga. Muka signed his first managerial contract on the day of Dede's departure on 9 February 2010.

== Career statistics ==
=== Club ===
As of 21 November 2015

Appearances and goals by club, season and competition
Club	Season	League		Cup		Continental (Note: Includes UEFA Champions League and UEFA Europa League)		Other (Note: Includes Albanian Supercup)		Total	
Club	Season	Apps	Goals	Apps	Goals	Apps	Goals	Apps	Goals	Apps	Goals
KF Tirana	2002–03	23	8	1	0	—		—		24	8
KF Tirana	2003–04	30	15	8	1	4	0	1	0	43	16
KF Tirana	2004–05	32	14	9	1	4	4	1	0	46	19
KF Tirana	2005–06	33	7	9	5	3	0	1	0	46	12
KF Tirana	2006–07	23	3	1	1	4	1	1	1	29	6
KF Tirana	2007–08	3	0	0	0	2	0	1	1	6	1
KF Tirana	2008–09	15	4	6	0	—		—		21	4
KF Tirana	2009–10	19	4	0	0	1	1	—		20	5
KF Tirana	2010–11	8	1	0	0	0	0	—		8	1
KF Tirana	Total	186	56	34	8	20	6	5	2	245	72
Career total		186	56	34	8	20	6	5	2	245	72

=== International ===
Appearances and goals by national team and year
National team	Year	Apps	Goals
Albania	1998	1	0
Albania	1999	4	1
Albania	2000	8	0
Albania	2001	4	0
Albania	2002	2	0
Albania	2003	4	0
Albania	2004	3	0
Albania	2005	1	0
Albania	2006	4	0
Albania	2007	8	0
Total		39	1

Scores and results list Albania's goal tally first.

No	Date	Venue	Opponent	Score	Result	Competition
1.	4 September 1999	Qemal Stafa Stadium, Tirana, Albania	Latvia	3–3	3–3	UEFA Euro 2000 qualification
