= Gentian Hajdari =

Albanian footballer

Personal information
- Full name: Gentian Hajdari
- Date of birth: 1 April 1975 (age 51)
- Place of birth: Albania
- Position: Defender

Senior career*
Years	Team	Apps	(Gls)
1995–2000	Dinamo Tirana	98	(2)
2000–2008	Tirana	136	(1)
Total		234	(3)
- * Club domestic league appearances and goals

Gentian Hajdari (born 1 April 1975 in Albania) is a former Albanian footballer. The defender retired at the end of the 2007–2008 season after having spent his career at Dinamo Tirana and SK Tirana.
