= Fjodor Xhafa =

Albanian footballer and coach

Personal information
- Full name: Fjodor Xhafa
- Date of birth: 8 March 1976 (age 50)
- Place of birth: Vlorë, PSR Albania
- Height: 1.76 m (5 ft 9 in)
- Position: Striker

Youth career
- Flamurtari Vlorë

Senior career*
Years	Team	Apps	(Gls)
1993–1996	Flamurtari	22	(1)
1996–1997	Bylis	15	(4)
1997–1999	Flamurtari	55	(16)
1999–2000	Dinamo Tirana	25	(8)
2000	Mons	9	(1)
2001	Bylis	11	(4)
2001–2002	Dinamo Tirana	23	(11)
2002–2005	Tirana	102	(28)
2005–2006	Dinamo Tirana	15	(4)
2006–2007	Flamurtari	29	(4)
2007–2009	Elbasani	53	(8)
2010–2013	Bylis	72	(18)

International career^{‡}
1999–2001	Albania U-21	8	(0)
2002	Albania	1	(0)
- * Club domestic league appearances and goals as of 17 May 2009 ‡ National team caps and goals as of 17 May 2009

Fjodor Xhafa (born 8 March 1976) is an Albanian former footballer who played as a striker, and a current coach.

== Club career ==
Xhafa was registered as Elbasani player for the 2007–08 season.

On 26 July 2010, Xhafa, at 34 years old, agreed personal terms and joined Bylis Ballsh for a third time.

During the summer of 2013, Xhafa decided to end his football playing career after 20 years as a professional footballer, starting the coaching career as the assistant manager of Bylis Ballsh.

== International career ==
On 13 March 2002, Xhafa played his first and last match with Albania national team, substituting the fellow debutant Dritan Babamusta in the 56th minute in the 4–0 away loss at Qualcomm Stadium against Mexico.

== Personal life ==
He is the son of Uran Xhafa, a former professional footballer who played for Partizani.

== Honours ==
=== Club ===
Dinamo Tirana

- Albanian Superliga: 2001–02

Tirana

- Albanian Superliga: 2002–03, 2003–04, 2004–05
- Albanian Cup: 2005–06
