= Suad Liçi =

Albanian footballer (born 1974)

Personal information
- Full name: Suad Liçi
- Date of birth: 24 March 1974 (age 52)
- Place of birth: Shkodër, Albania
- Position: Defensive midfielder

Senior career*
Years	Team	Apps	(Gls)
1992–1999	Vllaznia	135	(23)
1999–2000	Teuta	21	(4)
2000–2001	Luftëtari	13	(2)
2001–2002	Vllaznia	23	(2)
2002–2004	Tirana	53	(4)
2004–2005	Vllaznia	34	(7)
2005	FK Baku	0	(0)
2006–2009	Vllaznia	98	(14)

International career
2000–2005	Albania	6	(0)
- * Club domestic league appearances and goals

Suad Liçi (born 24 March 1974 in Shkoder) is an Albanian football midfielder who last played for KS Vllaznia Shkoder in 2008–2009 season in the Albanian Superliga before retiring.

== Club career ==
He has previously played for KF Tirana and FK Baku in Azerbaijan. Suad Lici has worn the Red and Blue shirt for KS Vllaznia for over 290 games and scored 46. He won two Albanian Superliga in 1997–1998, and 2000–2001 and also the same years as he won the league trophies he won two Albanian Supercup too in 1997–1998, and 2000–2001. The last trophy he won was with KS Vllaznia the Albanian Cup in 2007–2008 against one of his previous clubs KF Tirana. His overall record in Albanian Superliga is 358 games. He scored 56 times and won 11 trophies. Also Suad Lici played in Azerbaijan which he managed to win the Yuksak Liqa in 2005–2006 season.

== International career ==
He made his debut for Albania in a February 2000 Malta Tournament match against Andorra and earned a total of 6 caps, scoring no goals. His final international was a May 2005 friendly match against Poland.

=== National team statistics ===
Albania national team
Year	Apps	Goals
2000	3	0
2001	0	0
2002	0	0
2003	0	0
2004	1	0
2005	2	0
Total	6	0

== Honours ==
- Winner of the Albanian Superliga 1997–1998 with Vllaznia Shkoder
- Winner of the Albanian Supercup 1997–1998 with Vllaznia Shkoder
- Winner of the Albanian Superliga 2000–2001 with Vllaznia Shkoder
- Winner of the Albanian Supercup 2000–2001 with Vllaznia Shkoder
- Winner of the Albanian Cup 1999–2000 with Teuta Durrës
- Winner of the Albanian Superliga 2002–2003 with KF Tirana
- Winner of the Albanian Supercup 2002–2003 with KF Tirana
- Winner of the Albanian Superliga 2003–2004 with KF Tirana
- Winner of the Albanian Supercup 2003–2004 with KF Tirana
- Winner of the Albanian Superliga 2004–2005 with KF Tirana
- Winner of the Yuksak Liqa 2005–2006 with FK Baku
- Winner of the Albanian Cup 2007–2008 with Vllaznia Shkoder
