= Sokol Prenga =

Albanian footballer

Personal information
- Date of birth: 24 May 1971 (age 55)
- Place of birth: Tirana, Albania
- Height: 1.82 m (6 ft 0 in)
- Position: Midfielder

Senior career*
Years	Team	Apps	(Gls)
1991–1992	Dinamo Tirana		
1994–1996	KF Tirana		
1996–1997	Flamurtari		
1997	KF Tirana		
1998	TSV Hartberg		
1998–1999	KF Tirana		
2000	Teuta		
2000–2001	KF Tirana		
2001–2002	FK Partizani Tirana		
2002–2004	KF Tirana		

International career
1995–1997	Albania	7	(0)
- * Club domestic league appearances and goals

Sokol Prenga (born 24 May 1971) is an Albanian former footballer who played as a midfielder for KF Tirana, and the Albania national team. He made seven appearances for the national team, from 1995 to 1997.
