= Shkumbini Stadium =

Multi-use stadium in Peqin, Albania

Coordinates: 41°02′32.90″N 19°45′09.98″E

- Fusha Sportive Peqin
- Interactive map of Shkumbini Stadium
- Location: Peqin, Albania
- Owner: KS Shkumbini Peqin
- Capacity: 9,000
- Surface: Grass
- Field size: 107 m × 68 m (351 ft × 223 ft)

Tenant
- KS Shkumbini Peqin

Shkumbini Stadium is a multi-use stadium in Peqin, Albania. It is currently used mostly for football matches and is the home ground of KS Shkumbini. The stadium has a capacity of 9,000 people.
