= January Zyambo =

Zambian footballer (born 1980)

Personal information
- Full name: January Zyambo
- Date of birth: September 10, 1980 (age 46)
- Place of birth: Zambia
- Height: 1.84 m (6 ft 0 in)
- Position: Striker

Senior career*
| Years | Team | Apps | (Gls) |
| 1999–2001 | Kabwe Warriors | | |
| 2002 | Bylis Ballsh | 7 | (4) |
| 2003–2004 | Dinamo Tirana | 40 | (17) |
| 2004 | Vllaznia Shkodër | 9 | (3) |
| 2005 | Olympiakos Nicosia | 7 | (0) |
| 2005–2006 | Teuta Durrës | | |
| 2006–2009 | Kastrioti Krujë | 37 | (8) |
| 2009–2011 | KF Gramshi | | |
| 2011 | FC Kamza | 12 | (3) |
| 2012 | Besa Kavajë | 7 | (1) |
| 2013–2015 | KF Gramshi | 9 | (1) |

International career^{‡}
| 2000–2001 | Zambia | 5 | (0) |
- * Club domestic league appearances and goals as of 10 September 2015 ‡ National team caps and goals as of July 2009

January Zyambo (born September 9, 1980) is a Zambian professional soccer forward who plays for KS Besa Kavaje in Albanian First Division.
