= Abdurrahman Roza Haxhiu Stadium =

Multipurpose stadium in Lushnja, Albania

Coordinates: 40°56′07.53″N 19°42′34.72″E

- Roza Haxhiu Stadium
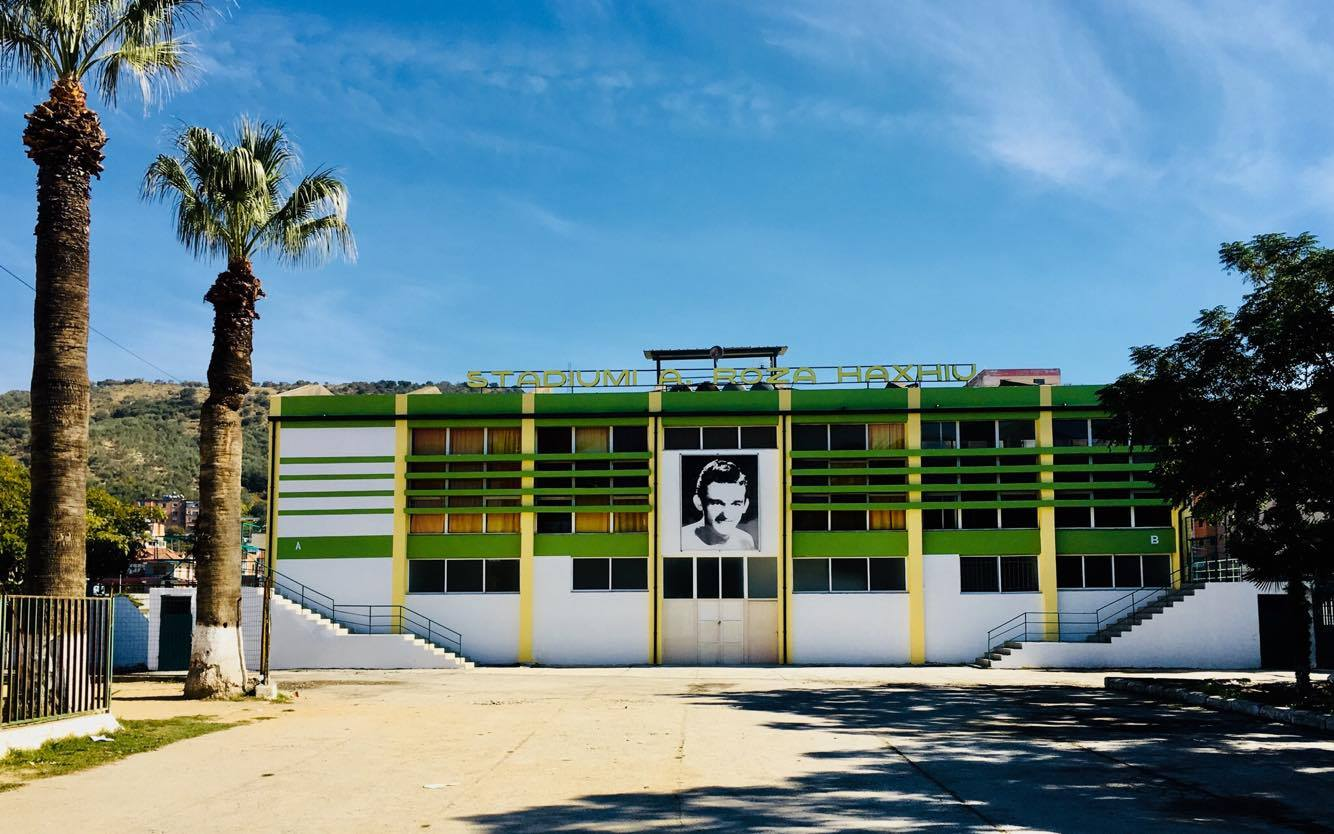
- Interactive map of Abdurrahman Roza Haxhiu Stadium
- Location: Lushnjë, Albania
- Owner: Municipality of Lushnja, KS Lushnja
- Capacity: 8,500
- Surface: Natural grass

Construction
- Opened: 1961
- Renovated: 2003, 2015, 2017

Tenant
- KF Lushnja

Abdurrahman Stadium Roza Haxhiu Stadium (or: Stadium A. Roza Haxhiu) is a stadium for many uses in Lushnja, Albania. It is currently used mostly for football matches and is the host stadium for the KS Lushnja team. The stadium has a capacity of 8,500 seats and a standing capacity of about 12,000 participants.

== History ==
The football field where Traktori Lushnja was playing before the 1960s was exactly where the "18 October" gymnasium is in the city centre. Construction of today's stadium started in the 1960s in the city of Lushnja has begun. It had the name Tractor, just like the name of the team. In 1992, with the decision of the Lushnja Municipal Council, the football stadium was awarded the honorary name of the legendary Albanian legend Abdurrahman Roza Haxhiu in respect for the contribution that this footballer and coach has given to football and Albanian football. The stadium capacity "A. Roza Haxhiu "is about 8 thousand seats. Stadium Tribune "A. Roza Haxhiu "has been painted with the colours of the yellow and green Lushnja team and in her centre is located a great portrait of football legend Lusnjarë dhe Albanët Abdurrahman Roza Haxhiu. In the premises of the stadium "A. Roza Haxhiu "after the opening of two Lushnja 20th-century sports photos in 2006 and 2008 and the 20th century edition of Lushnja's sport history, Mr.Vergjil XHAFA opened in 2015 the Lushnja football museum. In this museum are placed numerous photographs that reflect the whole history of football. Also located is the bust of the martyr of the legendary Albanian field Abdurrahman Roza Haxhiu worked very skillfully and professionally by sculptor Lushnjar Mr.Maks Bushi.

== Stadium ==
The Stadium Abdurrahman Roza Haxhiu is an old stadium that seats 8,500 and 12,000 standing capacity. The stadium opened in 1961. The stadium was established during the Communism Era. This was one of the biggest stadiums in Albania at the time. This stadium has had international games like the Albania national under-19 football team and the Kazakhstan national under-19 football team.
