= Besa Stadium =

Stadium in Kavajë, Albania

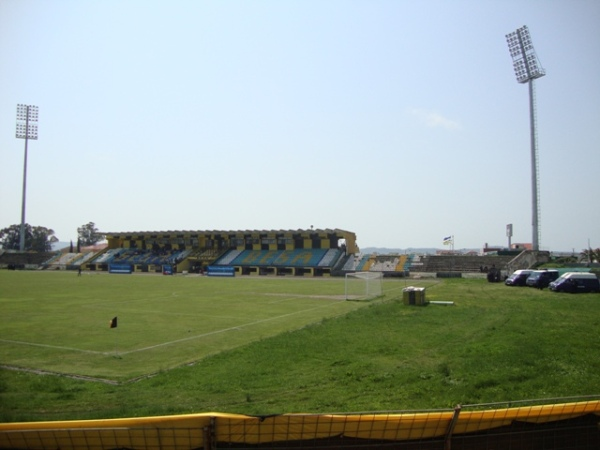
- Interactive map of Besa Stadium
- Location: Rr. Vangjel Thanasi 7 Kavajë, Albania
- Coordinates: 41°11′18.81″N 19°33′11.69″E
- Owner: Bashkia Kavajë
- Capacity: 8,000
- Surface: Grass
- Field size: 105 m × 70 m (344 ft × 230 ft)
- Field shape: Elliptical

Construction
- Groundbreaking: 1968
- Opened: 26 April 1974; 52 years ago
- Expanded: 1988-1990
- Architects: Isuf Sukaj, Mehmet Qarri
- Structural engineers: Agim Koçi, Nikolla Verdho

Tenants
- Besa Kavajë; Bashkia Kavajë

Besa Stadium (Albanian: Stadiumi Besa) is a football stadium in Kavajë, Albania. It is the home ground of Besa Kavajë. The stadium has a full seating capacity of about 8,000.

== History ==
Project for the construction of a new stadium in Kavajë began as early as 1968.
