= Niko Dovana Stadium =

Stadium in Durrës, Albania

Coordinates: 41°19′33.89″N 19°26′59.48″E

- "Stadium Niko Dovana"
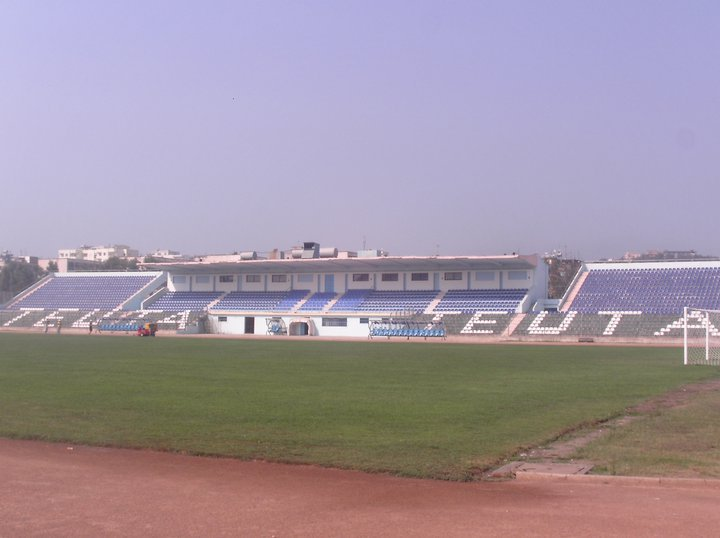
- Niko Dovana Stadium in 2014.
- Interactive map of Niko Dovana Stadium
- Full name: Niko Dovana Stadium
- Former names: Lokomotiva Stadium (1965–1991)
- Location: Rruga Aleksander Goga; Durrës, Albania
- Owner: Durrës Municipality
- Operator: Teuta
- Capacity: 12,040
- Surface: Natural grass

Construction
- Built: 1965
- Opened: 1965
- Renovated: 2017

Tenant
- Teuta (1965–present)

The Niko Dovana Stadium, officially Stadiumi "Niko Dovana", is a multi-use stadium located in Durrës, Albania. It is the home ground of Teuta. The capacity is 12,040 of which 4,340 seated, making it the fifth largest ground in the country. It was renamed in 1991 in honour of former Teuta goalkeeper and financier Niko Dovana.

The Albania national football team played in the Niko Dovana Stadium for the first time in a friendly international match against Uzbekistan on 11 August 2010.

The stadium has also been used as a shelter in the aftermath of the 2019 Albania earthquake.

== International matches ==
The Niko Dovana Stadium has hosted 2 friendly matches of the Albania national football team.

11 August 2010 International Friendly	Albania	1–0	Uzbekistan	Durrës, Albania
19:30	Salihi 14'	Report		Stadium: Niko Dovana Stadium; Attendance: 8,000; Referee: Pavle Radovanović (Montenegro)

5 March 2014 International Friendly	Albania	2–0	Malta	Durrës, Albania
17:00	Basha 26'; Meha 53'	Report		Stadium: Niko Dovana Stadium; Attendance: 8,000; Referee: Dejan Jakimovski (Macedonia)
