= 2008–09 KF Tirana season =

Tirana
2008–09 season
- President: Refik Halili
- Head coach: Blaz Sliskovic (until 10 December 2008); Agustin Kola (until 7 May 2009); Alban Tafaj (caretaker manager)
- Stadium: Selman Stërmasi Stadium; Qemal Stafa Stadium
- Kategoria Superiore: 1st
- Albanian Cup: Runners-up
- Top goalscorer: League: Migen Memelli (22); All: Migen Memelli (30)
- Highest home attendance: 20,000 vs Vllaznia Shkodër (23 May 2009)
- Lowest home attendance: 300 vs Shkumbini Peqin (9 May 2009)
| Home colours | Away colours | Third colours |

The 2008–09 season was Klubi i Futbollit Tirana's 70th competitive season, 70th consecutive season in the Kategoria Superiore and 88th year in existence as a football club.

== Season overview ==
In October 2008, Tirana won the inaugural Taçi Oil Cup by beating then-FIFA Club World Cup winners Milan 2–1 with goals scored by Daniel Xhafaj and Muzaka. Later on 10 December, manager Blaz Sliskovic was sacked by president Refik Halili after collecting only one win in the last seven league matches. He was replaced by club legend Agustin Kola who led the team until May of the following year.

Tirana won their 24th championship in history on 23 May 2009 by winning 2–1 at home against Vllaznia Shkodër in the final matchday. In cup, the team reached the final once again, this time losing to Flamurtari Vlorë at Niko Dovana Stadium. The leading figure of Tirana in this season was the striker Migen Memelli brought on loan from Sweden's GAIS, who scored an impressive 22 league goals and won the Golden Boot for the first time in his career. Memelli with Tirana also set the record for the fastest goal ever scored in the Kategoria Superiore when he netted inside 7 seconds in the 2–1 win at Flamurtari Vlorë on 5 April.

== Kit ==
- Supplier: Puma
- Sponsor: Volkswagen Classic

== Other information ==
| President | Refik Halili |
| Ground (capacity and dimensions) | Selman Stërmasi stadium (12, 500 / 105m x 68m) |

Source: Selman Stërmasi stadium

== Current squad ==
As of May 2009 players in bold have a least one cap for an international team Note: Flags indicate national team as defined under FIFA eligibility rules; some limited exceptions apply. Players may hold more than one non-FIFA nationality.

| No. | Pos. | Nation | Player |
|---|---|---|---|
| 1 | GK | ALB | **Blendi Nallbani** (vice-captain) |
| 2 | DF | ALB | Enri Tafaj |
| 3 | DF | ALB | **Rezart Dabulla** |
| 4 | DF | CRO | Lek Kcira |
| 5 | DF | ALB | Entonio Pashaj |
| 6 | DF | ALB | **Andi Lila** |
| 7 | MF | ALB | Blerti Hajdari |
| 8 | MF | ALB | Jetmir Sefa |
| 9 | FW | ALB | **Migen Memelli** |
| 10 | MF | ALB | **Devis Mukaj** (captain) |
| 12 | GK | MKD | Pece Korunovski |
| 13 | MF | ALB | Sajmir Patushi |
| 14 | MF | ALB | **Bledar Devolli** |
| 15 | MF | ALB | **Ansi Agolli** |
| 16 | DF | NGA | Abraham Alechenwu |

| No. | Pos. | Nation | Player |
|---|---|---|---|
| 17 | MF | ALB | Florenc Arapi |
| 18 | FW | ALB | Ergys Sorra |
| 19 | DF | ALB | **Tefik Osmani** |
| 20 | MF | ALB | Erald Deliallisi |
| 21 | MF | CRO | Toni Pezo |
| 22 | FW | ALB | Daniel Xhafa |
| 23 | MF | ALB | Sabien Lila |
| 24 | MF | ALB | **Gjergji Muzaka** |
| 31 | GK | ALB | Klajdi Kuka |
| 32 | FW | ALB | Xhulian Rrudho |
| - | GK | ALB | Gledis Tafaj |
| - | MF | ALB | Gerald Tusha |
| - | MF | ALB | Migen Metani |
| - | MF | ALB | Besmir Bega |
| - | FW | ALB | Hendrit Ferra |

== Captain Hierarchy ==
1. (Albania) Devis Mukaj
2. (Albania) Blendi Nallbani

== Transfers ==
=== In ===
==== Summer ====
| # | Pos | Player | From | Fee | Date |
|---|---|---|---|---|---|
| 5 | DF | (Albania) Entonio Pashaj | Teuta Durres | | July 2008 |
| 16 | DF | (Nigeria) Abraham Alechenwu | Dinamo Tirana | 150,000 € | July 2008 |
| 6 | DF | (Albania) Andi Lila | Besa Kavaje | | July 2008 |
| 14 | MF | (Albania) Bledar Devolli | Partizani Tirana | Free | July 2008 |
| 12 | GK | (North Macedonia) Pece Korunovski | Vardar Skopje | | July 2008 |
| | DF | (Albania) Rezart Dabulla | KS Shkumbini Peqin | | July 2008 |
| 21 | MF | (Croatia) Toni Pezo | Hajduk Split | Loan | July 2008 |
| 9 | FW | (Albania) Migen Memelli | GAIS | Loan | July 2008 |
| 15 | MF | (Albania) Ansi Agolli | Vaasan Palloseura | Loan | July 2008 |
| 22 | FW | (Albania) Daniel Xhafa | Dinamo Tirana | Loan Expired | August 2008 |
| 19 | DF | (Albania) Tefik Osmani | Partizani Tirana | | August 2008 |
| 24 | MF | (Albania) Gjergji Muzaka | Partizani Tirana | 70,000 € | August 2008 |

==== Winter ====
| # | Pos | Player | From | Fee | Date |
|---|---|---|---|---|---|
| 13 | MF | (Albania) Sajmir Patushi | None | Free | December 19, 2009 |
| 32 | FW | (Albania) Xhulian Rrudho | Partizani Tirana | | January 5, 2009 |

=== Out ===
==== Summer ====
| # | Pos | Player | To | Fee | Date |
|---|---|---|---|---|---|
| 21 | MF | (Albania) Klodian Duro | AC Omonoia | Free | May 21, 2008 |
| 7 | MF | (Albania) Jahmir Hyka | Olympiacos F.C. | Loan Expired | June 3, 2008 |
| | DF | (Albania) Gentian Hajdari | None | Retired | July, 2008 |
| | MF | (Albania) Eldorado Merkoçi | None | Retired | July, 2008 |
| | MF | (Albania) Hetlem Capja | Dinamo Tirana | | July, 2008 |
| | DF | (Albania) Elvis Sina | Dinamo Tirana | | July, 2008 |
| 22 | FW | (Albania) Daniel Xhafa | Dinamo Tirana | Loan | July, 2008 |
| | GK | (Albania) Alfred Osmani | KF Elbasani | | July, 2008 |
| | DF | (Albania) Engert Bakalli | KF Elbasani | | July, 2008 |
| | DF | (Albania) Endrit Vrapi | KF Elbasani | | July, 2008 |
| | FW | (Albania) Erbim Fagu | KF Elbasani | 120,000 € | July, 2008 |
| | FW | (Kosovo) Berat Hyseni | KF Prishtina | | July, 2008 |
| | DF | (North Macedonia) Saso Gjoreski | None | Free | July, 2008 |
| | MF | (France) Laurent Mohellebi | None | Free | July, 2008 |
| | DF | (Albania) Erion Xhafa | KS Besa Kavaje | | July, 2008 |
| | GK | (Albania) Eni Malaj | KS Dajti | Loan | July, 2008 |

==== Winter ====
| # | Pos | Player | To | Fee | Date |
|---|---|---|---|---|---|
| 2 | FW | (Albania) Enri Tafaj | KS Dajti | Loan | January, 2009 |
| 17 | MF | (Albania) Florenc Arapi | KS Bylis Ballsh | Loan | January 7, 2009 |
| | MF | (United States) Besmir Bega | Partizani Tirana | Loan | January, 2009 |

=== Starting 11 ===
| No. | Pos. | Nat. | Name | MS | Notes |
|---|---|---|---|---|---|
| 1 | GK | (Albania) | Nallbani | 29 | |
| 6 | RB | (Albania) | Lila | 29 | |
| 21 | CB | (Croatia) | Pezo | 30 | |
| 19 | CB | (Albania) | Osmani | 24 | |
| 16 | LB | (Nigeria) | Alechenwu | 30 | |
| 14 | CM | (Albania) | Devolli | 30 | |
| 10 | CM | (Albania) | Devis Mukaj | 15 | |
| 15 | LW | (Albania) | Agolli | 30 | |
| 24 | RW | (Albania) | Muzaka | 30 | |
| 22 | FW | (Albania) | Xhafa | 31 | |
| 9 | FW | (Albania) | Memelli | 29 | |

Last updated: June 1, 2009
Source: Squad stats and Start formations.
Only competitive matches.
Using the most used start formation.
Ordered by position on pitch (from back right to front left).

== Pre-season and friendlies ==
=== Taçi Oil Cup ===
| 14 October 2008 Friendly | Tirana | 2–1 | Milan | Tirana |
| 20:00 CEST | Xhafaj 29'; Muzaka 72' | Report | Ronaldinho 90+1' | Stadium: Qemal Stafa Stadium; Attendance: 20,000; Referee: Albano Janku |

== Competitions ==
=== Overview ===
| Competition | First match | Last match | Starting round | Final position | Record | | | | | | | |
| Competition | First match | Last match | Starting round | Final position | Pld | W | D | L | GF | GA | GD | Win % |
|---|---|---|---|---|---|---|---|---|---|---|---|---|
| Kategoria Superiore | 24 August 2008 | 23 May 2009 | Matchday 1 | Winners | 33 | 19 | 11 | 3 | 58 | 27 | +31 | 57.58 |
| Albanian Cup | 29 October 2008 | 24 May 2008 | First round | Runners-up | 9 | 5 | 3 | 1 | 15 | 4 | +11 | 55.56 |
| Total | | | | | 42 | 24 | 14 | 4 | 73 | 31 | +42 | 57.14 |

Last updated: 23 May 2009
Source: Competitions

=== Kategoria Superiore ===
==== League table ====
| Pos | Team | Pld | W | D | L | GF | GA | GD | Pts | Qualification or relegation |
|---|---|---|---|---|---|---|---|---|---|---|
| 1 | Tirana (C) | 33 | 19 | 11 | 3 | 58 | 27 | +31 | 68 | Qualification for the Champions League second qualifying round |
| 2 | Vllaznia | 33 | 19 | 7 | 7 | 49 | 29 | +20 | 64 | Qualification for the Europa League first qualifying round |
| 3 | Dinamo Tirana | 33 | 14 | 10 | 9 | 48 | 34 | +14 | 52 | Qualification for the Europa League first qualifying round |
| 4 | Teuta | 33 | 12 | 8 | 13 | 32 | 34 | −2 | 44 | |
| 5 | Shkumbini | 33 | 12 | 8 | 13 | 32 | 38 | −6 | 44 | |

Source: Albanian Football Association (in Albanian), Soccerway
Rules for classification: 1) points; 2) points in head-to-head matches; 3) goal difference in head-to-head matches; 4) goals scored in head-to-head matches; 5) total goal difference; 6) total goals scored; 7) draw
(C) Champions

==== Results summary ====
| Overall | | | | | | | | Home | | | | | | Away | | | | | |
| Pld | W | D | L | GF | GA | GD | Pts | W | D | L | GF | GA | GD | W | D | L | GF | GA | GD |
|---|---|---|---|---|---|---|---|---|---|---|---|---|---|---|---|---|---|---|---|
| 33 | 19 | 11 | 3 | 58 | 27 | +31 | 68 | 13 | 3 | 1 | 38 | 13 | +25 | 6 | 8 | 2 | 20 | 14 | +6 |

Source: Competitive matches

==== Results by round ====
| Round | 1 | 2 | 3 | 4 | 5 | 6 | 7 | 8 | 9 | 10 | 11 | 12 | 13 | 14 | 15 | 16 | 17 | 18 | 19 | 20 | 21 | 22 | 23 | 24 | 25 | 26 | 27 | 28 | 29 | 30 | 31 | 32 | 33 |
|---|---|---|---|---|---|---|---|---|---|---|---|---|---|---|---|---|---|---|---|---|---|---|---|---|---|---|---|---|---|---|---|---|---|
| Ground | A | A | H | A | H | A | H | A | H | A | H | H | H | A | H | A | H | A | H | A | H | A | H | A | H | A | H | A | H | A | H | A | H |
| Result | D | W | W | W | W | D | W | D | D | L | W | D | L | D | W | L | W | W | W | W | D | D | W | D | W | W | W | D | W | D | W | W | W |
| Position | 4 | 4 | 2 | 1 | 1 | 1 | 1 | 1 | 1 | 1 | 1 | 1 | 2 | 2 | 2 | 2 | 2 | 2 | 2 | 1 | 2 | 1 | 1 | 1 | 1 | 1 | 1 | 1 | 1 | 2 | 2 | 1 | 1 |

Source: Competitive matches
A = Away; H = Home; W = Win; D = Draw; L = Loss

==== Matches ====
| 24 August 2008 1 | Vllaznia Shkodër | 0–0 | Tirana | Shkodër |
| 19:00 CET | Smajli (yellow card) | | Osmani (yellow card); Dabulla (yellow card); Devolli (yellow card) | Stadium: Loro Boriçi Stadium; Referee: Kridens Meta |

| 30 August 2008 2 | Teuta Durrës | 0–1 | Tirana | Durrës |
| 15:00 CET | Dushku (yellow card); Muçollari (yellow card); Buna (yellow card) | | Memelli 42'; Lila (yellow card) | Stadium: Niko Dovana Stadium; Referee: Sokol Cekaj |

| 14 September 2008 3 | Tirana | 2–1 | Partizani Tirana | Tirana |
| 16:30 CET | Xhafaj 20'; Lila 90', (yellow card); Nallbani (yellow card); Osmani (yellow card); Pezo (yellow card); Devolli (yellow card) | | Kalari (yellow card) 0' (yellow-red card) 48'; Bruno 58'; Tafaj (yellow card) | Stadium: Selman Stërmasi Stadium; Referee: Elvis Peza |

| 20 September 2008 4 | Apolonia Fier | 0–2 | Tirana | Fier |
| 16:00 CET | Bedini (yellow card); Srecković (yellow card) | | Lila 28'; Memelli 32', (yellow card); Devolli (yellow card) | Stadium: Loni Papuçiu Stadium; Referee: Bardhyl Pashaj |

| 27 September 2008 5 | Tirana | 3–1 | Flamurtari Vlorë | Tirana |
| 16:00 CET | Memelli 17', 57', 61'; Lila (yellow card) | | Con 31', (yellow card); Panić (yellow card) 0' (yellow-red card) 38'; Alviž (yellow card) | Stadium: Selman Stërmasi Stadium |

| 4 October 2008 6 | Bylis Ballsh | 0–0 | Tirana | Ballsh |
| 15:00 CET | Driza (yellow card); Muça (yellow card); E. Dalipi (yellow card); K. Dalipi (yellow card); Stafa (yellow card) | | Agolli (yellow card); Memelli (yellow card); Sefa (yellow card) | Stadium: Adush Muça Stadium; Attendance: 6,000; Referee: Erjon Dobi |

| 19 October 2008 7 | Tirana | 2–1 | Dinamo Tirana | Tirana |
| 18:30 CET | Memelli 32'; Muzaka 54'; Lila (yellow card) | | Allmuça 75' | Stadium: Qemal Stafa Stadium; Referee: Sokol Jareci |

| 25 October 2008 8 | Shkumbini Peqin | 0–0 | Tirana | Peqin |
| 14:30 CET | Mustafaj (yellow card); Turdiu (yellow card) | | Abraham (yellow card) | Stadium: Shkumbini StadiumH; Referee: Sokol Cekaj |

| 2 November 2008 9 | Tirana | 1–1 | Besa Kavajë | Tirana |
| 14:30 CET | Sefa 63'; Agolli (yellow card); Pezo (yellow card); Devolli (yellow card) | | Mançaku 17'; Kuli (yellow card); Progni (yellow card) 0' (yellow-red card) 82' | Stadium: Selman Stërmasi Stadium; Referee: Albano Janku |

| 9 November 2008 10 | Elbasani | 1–0 | Tirana | Elbasan |
| 15:00 CET | Abazaj 18'; Kacollja (yellow card) | | Nallbani (yellow card) | Stadium: Ruzhdi Bizhuta Stadium; Attendance: 7,000; Referee: Tanush Latifi |

| 15 November 2008 11 | Tirana | 1–0 | Lushnja | Tirana |
| 14:00 CET | Ndoni 13' (o.g.); Kcira (red card) 26'; Lila (yellow card); Lilaj (yellow card) | | Hasalla (yellow card); Çela (yellow card); Arbëri (yellow card) | Stadium: Selman Stërmasi Stadium; Attendance: 400; Referee: Sokol Cekaj |

| 23 November 2008 12 | Tirana | 1–1 | Vllaznia Shkodër | Tirana |
| 14:00 CET | Devolli 79', (yellow card); Nallbani (yellow card); Agolli (yellow card); Arapi (yellow card) | | Boadu 32'; Beqiri (yellow card); Smajli (yellow card); Liçi (yellow card) | Stadium: Selman Stërmasi Stadium |

| 29 November 2008 13 | Tirana | 1–2 | Teuta Durrës | Tirana |
| 14:00 CET | Dabulla (yellow card); Sefa 77' | | Vila 21', 43'; Ymeraj (yellow card); Mile (yellow card) | Stadium: Selman Stërmasi Stadium |

| 7 December 2008 14 | Partizani Tirana | 2–2 | Tirana | Tirana |
| 14:00 CET | Karabeci 64', (yellow card); Ngjela 68'; Tafaj (yellow card); Malota (yellow card); Bakaj (yellow card) | | Sefa 2', (yellow card); Osmani (yellow card) 0' (yellow-red card) 68'; Agolli (yellow card); Abraham (yellow card); Memelli 82', (yellow card) | Stadium: Qemal Stafa Stadium; Attendance: 2,000; Referee: Sokol Jareci |

| 13 December 2008 15 | Tirana | 3–0 | Apolonia Fier | Tirana |
| 16:00 CET | Xhafaj 37', 48'; Arapi (yellow card); Lila 64'; Dabulla (yellow card) | | Shoshi (yellow card); Spaho (yellow card) | Stadium: Selman Stërmasi Stadium |

| 21 December 2008 16 | Flamurtari Vlorë | 2–0 | Tirana | Vlorë |
| 14:00 CET | Mema 61'; Rustemi 89'; Begaj (yellow card); Beqiri (yellow card); Alviž (yellow card); Brajkovic (yellow card); Guna (yellow card) | | Agolli (yellow card); Abraham (yellow card); Lila (yellow card); Muzaka (yellow card); Xhafaj (yellow card) | Stadium: Flamurtari Stadium |

| 27 December 2008 17 | Tirana | 6–2 | Bylis Ballsh | Tirana |
| 13:30 CET | Neves 2' (o.g.); Memelli 4', 35', 57'; Muzaka 13'; Xhafaj 32'; Nallbani (yellow card); Sefa (yellow card) | | Bakiu 10', 49'; Kapaj (yellow card) | Stadium: Selman Stërmasi Stadium; Referee: Albano Janku |

| 31 January 2009 18 | Dinamo Tirana | 2–4 | Tirana | Tirana |
| 17:00 CET | Sefa 7'; Plaku 11'; Nikolic (yellow card); Poçi (yellow card); Bakaj (yellow card); Brahja (yellow card) 0' (yellow-red card) 80'; Kotorri (red card) 85' | | Memelli 8', 77', (yellow card); Agolli 58'; Muka (yellow card) 0' (yellow-red card) 80'; Xhafaj 88', (yellow card); Dabulla (yellow card); Devolli (yellow card) | Stadium: Selman Stërmasi Stadium |

| 5 February 2009 19 | Tirana | 2–0 | Shkumbini Peqin | Tirana |
| 14:00 CET | Lila 27'; Agoli 70'; Sefa (yellow card) | | Bizhyti (yellow card) | Stadium: Selman Stërmasi Stadium |

| 15 February 2009 20 | Besa Kavajë | 1–3 | Tirana | Kavajë |
| 14:30 CET | Mihani 45', (yellow card); Fortunat (yellow card) | | Xhafaj 30'; Agolli 53'; Memelli 75'; Patushi (yellow card) | Stadium: Besa Stadium |

| 21 February 2009 21 | Tirana | 0–0 | Elbasani | Tirana |
| 14:30 CET | Memelli (yellow card) | | | Stadium: Selman Stërmasi Stadium |

| 1 March 2009 22 | Lushnja | 0–0 | Tirana | Lushnje |
| 16:00 CET | Bubeqi (yellow card) | | Agolli (yellow card) | Stadium: Abdurrahman Roza Haxhiu Stadium |

| 7 March 2009 23 | Tirana | 2–1 | Lushnja | Tirana |
| 16:00 CET | Memelli 22'; Muka 64' | | Bejte (yellow card); Çela 81' | Stadium: Selman Stërmasi Stadium |

| 15 March 2009 24 | Bylis Ballsh | 0–0 | Tirana | Ballsh |
| 14:00 CET | P. Arbëri (yellow card); Dalipi (yellow card); G. Arbëri (yellow card) | | Osmani (yellow card); Devolli (yellow card); Muzaka (yellow card); Memelli (yellow card) | Stadium: Adush Muça Stadium |

| 21 March 2009 25 | Tirana | 2–0 | Apolonia Fier | Tirana |
| 16:00 CET | Devolli 32'; Muka 75'; Agolli (yellow card); Pezo (yellow card) | | Hadžibulic (yellow card) | Stadium: Selman Stërmasi Stadium |

| 5 April 2009 26 | Flamurtari Vlorë | 1–2 | Tirana | Vlorë |
| 16:00 CET | Alviž 18' | | Memelli 1', 37'; Nallbani (yellow card); Dabulla (yellow card) | Stadium: Flamurtari Stadium |

| 11 April 2009 27 | Tirana | 3–0 | Elbasani | Tirana |
| 16:30 CET | Xhafaj 51'; Muka 77'; Memelli 86' | | Gava (yellow card) | Stadium: Selman Stërmasi Stadium |

| 18 April 2009 28 | Partizani Tirana | 2–2 | Tirana | Tirana |
| 16:30 CET | Babamusta 63'; Ngjela 67', (yellow card) | | Nallbani (yellow card); Xhafaj 56', 87' | Stadium: Qemal Stafa Stadium |

| 25 April 2009 29 | Tirana | 4–1 | Teuta Durrës | Tirana |
| 16:30 CET | Dabulla (yellow card); Devolli (yellow card); Memelli 5', 74'; Xhafaj 41'; Agolli 83' | | Sheta (yellow card); Dushku (yellow card); Vila 31', (yellow card); Buna (yellow card) | Stadium: Selman Stërmasi Stadium; Referee: Sokol Jareci |

| 2 May 2009 30 | Besa Kavajë | 1–1 | Tirana | Kavajë |
| 17:00 CET | Progni (red card) 45'; Fortunat 75'; Ishka (yellow card) | | Memelli 20'; Sefa (yellow card); Nallbani (red card) 81'; Lila (red card) 90+2' | Stadium: Besa Stadium; Referee: Elvis Peza |

| 9 May 2009 31 | Tirana | 3–1 | Shkumbini Peqin | Tirana |
| 16:30 CET | Mujdragic 18' (o.g.); Muzaka 27'; Memelli 31'; Pezo (yellow card) | | Pashja (yellow card); Nora (yellow card); Mujdragic 50'; Dervishi (yellow card) | Stadium: Qemal Stafa Stadium; Attendance: 300 |

| 16 May 2009 32 | Dinamo Tirana | 2–3 | Tirana | Tirana |
| 17:00 CET | Jusufi 57'; Cecco (yellow card); Bakaj 84' | | Agolli 12'; Lilaj 40'; Sorra 73' | Stadium: Selman Stërmasi Stadium; Referee: Sokol Cekaj |

| 23 May 2009 33 | Tirana | 2–1 | Vllaznia Shkodër | Tirana |
| 19:00 CET | Muka 2', (yellow card); Memelli 30'; Lila (yellow card); Devolli (yellow card); Agolli (yellow card) | | Sukaj (yellow card) , (goal) 88'; Sinani (yellow card); Belisha (yellow card); Liçi (yellow card); Grimaj (yellow card) | Stadium: Qemal Stafa Stadium; Attendance: 20,000; Referee: Vladimír Hrinák (Slovakia) |

=== Albanian Cup ===
==== First round ====
| 29 October 2008 First leg | Tërbuni Pukë | 1–4 | Tirana | Pukë |
| | Tafili 22'; Ahi (yellow card); Përfati (yellow card) | | Tafaj (yellow card); Arapi (yellow card); Xhafa 82' | Stadium: Ismail Xhemali Stadium |

| 12 November 2008 Second leg | Tirana | 1–0 (2–1 agg.) | Tërbuni Pukë | Tirana |
| | Memelli 89' | | | Stadium: Selman Stërmasi Stadium |

==== Second round ====
| 3 December 2008 First leg | Lushnja | 1–4 | Tirana | Lushnje |
| | Bakiasi (yellow card); G. Çela 44'; Arbëri (yellow card); E. Çela (yellow card); Bokatola (yellow card) | | Lila (yellow card); Memelli 47', 58'; Muzaka 65'; Sorra 90+1' | Stadium: Abdurrahman Roza Haxhiu Stadium |

| 17 December 2008 Second leg | Tirana | 5–0 (9–1 agg.) | Lushnja | Tirana |
| | Memelli 38', 64', 67', 87' (pen.), 90'; Metani (yellow card) | | E. Çela (yellow card); Ndoni (yellow card); Sula (yellow card); Canka (yellow card) | Stadium: Selman Stërmasi Stadium |

==== Quarter-finals ====
| 25 February 2009 First leg | Tirana | 0–0 | Elbasani | Tirana |
| 14:30 CET | Lila (yellow card); Agolli (yellow card); Muka (yellow card); Patushi (yellow card); Xhafaj (yellow card) | | Osmani (yellow card); Fagu (yellow card); Hyshmeri (yellow card); Xhafa (yellow card) | Stadium: Qemal Stafa Stadium; Referee: Albano Janku |

| 11 March 2009 Second leg | Elbasani | 0–2 (0–2 agg.) | Tirana | Elbasan |
| 14:30 CET | Beqiri (yellow card) | | Patushi 9'; Xhafaj 12' | Stadium: Ruzhdi Bizhuta Stadium; Attendance: 8,000; Referee: Albano Janku |

==== Semi-finals ====
| 15 April 2009 First leg | Vllaznia Shkodër | 0–0 | Tirana | Shkodër |
| 18:30 CET | Shtubina (yellow card) | | Agolli (yellow card); Dabulla (yellow card); Patushi (yellow card) | Stadium: Loro Boriçi Stadium; Attendance: 7,000 |

| 29 April 2009 Second leg | Tirana | 1–0 (a.e.t.) (1–0 agg.) | Vllaznia Shkodër | Tirana |
| 18:30 CET | Dabulla (yellow card); Xhafaj (yellow card); Memelli (yellow card); Sefa 105', (yellow card) | | Osja (yellow card); Beqiri (yellow card); Nallbani (yellow card) | Stadium: Qemal Stafa Stadium; Referee: Darko Čeferin (Slovenia) |

==== Final ====
| 6 May 2009 Final | Tirana | 1–2 | Flamurtari Vlorë | Durrës |
| 16:00 CEST | Dabulla 42' | | Mema 65'; Zeqiri 90+2' | Stadium: Niko Dovana Stadium; Attendance: 10,000; Referee: Bardhyl Pashaj |

== Statistics ==
=== Goalscorers ===
| No. | Pos. | Nation | Name | Kategoria Superiore | Albanian Cup | Total |
|---|---|---|---|---|---|---|
| 9 | FW | (Albania) | Migen Memelli | 22 | 8 | 30 |
| 22 | FW | (Albania) | Daniel Xhafaj | 10 | 2 | 12 |
| 15 | DF | (Albania) | Ansi Agolli | 5 | 0 | 5 |
| 6 | DF | (Albania) | Andi Lila | 4 | 0 | 4 |
| 8 | MF | (Albania) | Jetmir Sefa | 3 | 1 | 4 |
| 10 | MF | (Albania) | Devi Muka | 4 | 0 | 4 |
| 24 | MF | (Albania) | Gjergji Muzaka | 3 | 1 | 4 |
| 14 | MF | (Albania) | Bledar Devolli | 2 | 0 | 2 |
| 18 | FW | (Albania) | Ergys Sorra | 1 | 1 | 2 |
| 3 | DF | (Albania) | Rezart Dabulla | 0 | 1 | 1 |
| 13 | MF | (Albania) | Saimir Patushi | 0 | 1 | 1 |
| 23 | MF | (Albania) | Sabien Lilaj | 1 | 0 | 1 |
| # | Own goals | | | 3 | 0 | 3 |
| TOTAL | | | | 58 | 15 | 73 |

Last updated: 23 May 2009
