= 2009–10 KF Tirana season =

Tirana
2009–10 season
- President: Refik Halili
- Head coach: Ilija Lončarević (until 6 October 2009); Alban Tafaj (caretaker manager); Nevil Dede (until 9 February 2010); Devi Muka (caretaker manager); Luan Sengla (caretaker manager); Sulejman Starova
- Stadium: Selman Stërmasi Stadium; Qemal Stafa Stadium
- Kategoria Superiore: 3rd
- Albanian Cup: Quarter-finals
- Albanian Supercup: Winners
- Champions League: 2nd Qualifying Round
- Top goalscorer: League: Gjergji Muzaka (10); All: Gjergji Muzaka (10)
Home colours	Away colours	Third colours

The 2009–10 season was Klubi i Futbollit Tirana's 71st competitive season, 71st consecutive season in the Kategoria Superiore and 89th year in existence as a football club. Following the title win the previous season, KF Tirana added to their 22 titles to make it their record 23 title wins. As the club were the league winners they were Albania's only team to play in the Champions League which was against Norwegian side Stabæk IF.

== Background ==
=== Kit ===
- Supplier: Lotto Sport Italia
- Sponsor: Halili S.h.pk

=== Other information ===
President	Refik Halili
Ground (capacity and dimensions)	Selman Stërmasi stadium (12, 500 / 105m x 68m)

Source: Selman Stërmasi stadium

== Players ==
=== Squad information ===
N	Pos.	Nat.	Name	Age	Since	App	Goals	Ends	Transfer fee	Notes
1	GK	(Albania)	Nallbani	54	2004	86	1	2010	$1 million	
12	GK	(North Macedonia)	Korunovski	43	2008	5	0	2010	undisclosed	
31	GK	(Albania)	Kuka	35	2007	1	0	2011	Youth system	
3	DF	(Albania)	Dabulla	45	2008	25	0	2010	undisclosed	
19	DF	(Albania)	Osmani	40	2008	24	0	2010	€40,000	
5	DF	(Albania)	Pashaj	40	2008	4	0	2010	undisclosed	
16	DF	(Nigeria)	Abraham	39	2008	60	0	2010	$160,000	
6	DF	(Albania)	Lila	39	2008	30	4	2010	undisclosed	
4	MF	(France)	Mohellebi	41	2009	0	0	2011	€100,000	
14	MF	(Albania)	Devolli	47	2008	31	2	2010	Free	
23	MF	(Albania)	Lilaj	36	2008	21	1	2011	Youth system	
13	MF	(Albania)	Patushi	49	2009 (Winter)	15	0	2010	Free	
8	MF	(Albania)	Sefa	38	2005	75	6	2010	Youth system	
27	MF	(Albania)	Tusha	35	2008	3	0	2010	Youth system	
10	MF	(Albania)	Mukaj	48	2002	159	50	2010	undisclosed	
17	MF	(Albania)	Muzaka	41	2008	30	3	2010	€100,000	
7	MF	(Albania)	Hajdari	35	2007	10	0	2011	Youth system	
20	FW	(Albania)	Abilaliaj	39	2009	2	1	2011	Free	
9	FW	(Albania)	Ferra	36	2008	2	0	2011	Youth system	
15	FW	(Albania)	Memelli	45	2008	29	22	2009	undisclosed	
11	FW	(Albania)	Sorra	36	2007	5	1	2011	Youth system	
18	FW	(Albania)	Rica	35	2009	0	0	2010	Youth system	
?	DF	(Albania)	Bicaj	36	2009	0	0	2011	undisclosed	
?	DF	(Albania)	Ahmataj	46	2009	1	0	2010	Free	
?	DF	(Albania)	Dede	49	2009	0	0	2010	Free	
?	DF	(Albania)	Sina	46	2009	0	0	2010	undisclosed	
?	DF	(Albania)	Sinanaj	39	2009	0	0	2010	undisclosed	
?	MF	(Albania)	Karabeci	38	2009	0	0	2010	Free	
?	FW	(Albania)	Çeliku	38	2006	0	0	2010	Youth system	
?	FW	(Albania)	Malindi	37	2009	0	0	2010	undisclosed	

== Pre-season friendlies ==
=== Ohrid, Macedonia ===
Tirana's president Refik Halili chose not to reveal where the club would be holding their re-season training camp ahead of the club's appearance in the 2009–10 UEFA Champions League until he named the manager and the players had signed new contracts at the club. The two possibilities were either Ohrid in Macedonia or southern Turkey. After winning the 2008–09 Albanian Superliga the players received a three-week break ahead of the new season. It was announced that the team would be traveling to Oher, Macedonia instead of Turkey for their pre-season training camp on June 24, 2009, this was announced before Halili had signed a new coach which was not expected. The club along with new coach Ilija Lončarević traveled to Ohrid in western Macedonia for their pre-season training on June 28, 2009, which was four days after previously expected, the club left Tirana at 16:15 local time. The squad along with the staff planned to stay in Macedonia for nine days and had planned to three friendlies against Macedonian sides during their stay there. The club planned to stay at the 'Mizo' hotel in Oher for the duration of their trip. The club's first game was planned in Oher against local side FK Karaorman of Struga, however due to heavy rainfall the match was called off, it was due to be staged at a small stadium close to where Tirana was training, however it was expected for the friendly to be staged the next day depending on the weather. Tirana played their first game of the pre-season against Albanian-Macedonian side KF Vllaznimi on July 1, 2009, this match gave a chance for new coach Lončarević to try out the squad for the very first time and to see the younger and fringe players of the side as well. The 1st preseason game proved to be a success for the champions of Albania and the coach as Tirana won comfortably 6–0 against the Macedonian side. Besa Kavaje bound striker scored 2 goals, the captain Devis Mukaj netted once, as did Jetmir Sefa, Ergys Sorra and new signing Arbër Abilaliaj. Three days later the club faced their biggest test of the stay in Oher, FK Teteks. The match was played on July 4, 2009 and the scores ended 1–1 with both teams creating chances but neither able to in the end. Tirana then played local a Struga side who they beat 3–1 with mostly young players and also a Macedonian League selection team on July 6, 2009 who they beat comfortably 6–0, the second time they beat a team with this same scoreline after their first game against KF Vllaznimi. The goals came from doubles from both captain Devis Mukaj and midfielder Gjergji Muzaka and the rest came from Daniel Xhafa and Arbër Abilaliaj. The team and staff left Macedonia for Tirana on July 7, 2009 after they had finished their last dinner in Macedonia. The club had spent a week and a half in Macedonia and had played 4 friendlies against teams from different levels of football, this gave Lončarević the chance to see his players for the first time since taking on the job at Tirana and to witness some of his younger players. In total Tirana played 4 friendlies in Ohrid, winning 3 of them and drawing just one which was seen as a positive result out of Macedonia ahead of the club's Champions League games and the Albanian Supercup.

=== Total Games ===
1 July 2009 Friendly	Vllaznimi (North Macedonia)	0–6	(Albania) Tirana	Ohrid, Macedonia
			Xhafa; Muka; Sefa; Sorra; Abilaliaj	Stadium: SRC Biljanini Izvori

? July 2009 Friendly	Karaorman (North Macedonia)	1–3	(Albania) Tirana	Ohrid, Macedonia
				Stadium: SRC Biljanini Izvori

4 July 2009 Friendly	Teteks (North Macedonia)	1–1	(Albania) Tirana	Ohrid, Macedonia
		Report		Stadium: SRC Biljanini Izvori

6 July 2009 Friendly	Selection (North Macedonia)	0–6	(Albania) Tirana	Ohrid, Macedonia
			Mukaj; Muzaka; Xhafa; Abilaliaj	Stadium: SRC Biljanini Izvori

? July 2009 Friendly	Tirana (Albania)	5–1	(Albania) Kamza	Tirana, Albania

25 July 2009 Friendly	Tirana (Albania)	4–1	(Albania) Olimpiku	Tirana, Albania
	Lila; Xhafa; Ferra; Abilaliaj	Report

28 July 2009 Friendly	Tirana (Albania)	5–1	KF Tirana U-19	Tirana, Albania
	Sefa; Mukaj (p); Hajdari (p); Ferra; Abilaliaj	Report

6 August 2009 Friendly	Tirana (Albania)	1–1	(Albania) Partizani	Tirana, Albania
	Lila 21' (pen.)	Report

9 August 2009 Friendly	Tirana (Albania)	1–3	(Albania) Kastrioti	Tirana, Albania
	Lila 40'	Report

10 August 2009 Majaci Cup	Apolonia (Albania)	0–1	(Albania) Tirana	Fier, Albania
			Malindi 38'	Stadium: Abdurrahman Roza Haxhiu Stadium

10 August 2009 Majaci Cup	Apolonia (Albania)	1–1 (a.e.t.) (4–5 p)	(Albania) Tirana	Fier, Albania
			Abilaliaj 18'	Stadium: Abdurrahman Roza Haxhiu Stadium

== Competitions ==
=== Albanian Supercup ===
As 2008–09 Albanian Superliga champions Tirana kicked off the domestic 2009–10 season with the annual Albanian Supercup on August 16, 2009, where they played the 2008–09 Albanian Cup winners Flamurtari. The match was played at the Qemal Stafa Stadium with only a few thousand fans showing up from the start of the game. Tirana were forced to play an unusual line-up due to injury to some of their main players like inspirational leader Devis Mukaj and goal-machine Migen Memelli. Tirana started the game with just Arbër Abilaliaj up front with youngster Blerti Hajdari playing just behind the striker. The fans providing the atmosphere inside the stadium as always were the 'Tirona Fanatics', another notable fan was former chairman of KF Tirana and the president of Albania, Bamir Topi who had taken up his normal place in the V.I.P section of the stadium. The match itself started very slowly with very few chances to shout about until the second half when Tirana whipped in a corner and after confusion in the box former Flamurtari player Arbër Abilaliaj managed to scramble the ball into the back of the net on the 72nd minute mark. This proved to be the only goal in the game.

16 August 2009 Final	Tirana	1–0	Flamurtari Vlorë	Tirana
20:30 CET	Abilaliaj 72'			Stadium: Qemal Stafa Stadium; Attendance: 300; Referee: Albano Janku

=== Kategoria Superiore ===
==== League table ====
Pos	Team	Pld	W	D	L	GF	GA	GD	Pts	Qualification or relegation
1	Dinamo Tirana (C)	33	19	4	10	56	42	+14	61	Qualification for the Champions League second qualifying round
2	Besa	33	15	8	10	42	33	+9	53	Qualification for the Europa League second qualifying round (Note: Besa qualified for the Europa League second qualifying round by winning the 2009–10 Albanian Cup.)
3	Tirana	33	15	7	11	38	32	+6	52	Qualification for the Europa League first qualifying round
4	Laçi	33	14	9	10	35	28	+7	51	Qualification for the Europa League first qualifying round
5	Flamurtari	33	13	8	12	42	39	+3	47	

Source: Albanian Football Association (in Albanian), Soccerway
Rules for classification: 1) points; 2) points in head-to-head matches; 3) goal difference in head-to-head matches; 4) goals scored in head-to-head matches; 5) total goal difference; 6) total goals scored; 7) draw
(C) Champions

==== Results summary ====
Overall								Home						Away					
Pld	W	D	L	GF	GA	GD	Pts	W	D	L	GF	GA	GD	W	D	L	GF	GA	GD
33	15	7	11	38	32	+6	52	8	3	6	22	17	+5	7	4	5	16	15	+1

Last updated: 19 May 2010.
Source: Competitive matches

==== Results by round ====
Round	1	2	3	4	5	6	7	8	9	10	11	12	13	14	15	16	17	18	19	20	21	22	23	24	25	26	27	28	29	30	31	32	33
Ground	H	H	A	H	A	H	A	H	A	H	A	A	A	H	A	H	A	H	A	H	A	H	H	A	H	A	H	A	H	H	A	H	A
Result	L	W	W	D	L	D	L	W	W	W	L	W	D	D	D	W	W	L	W	L	L	W	L	L	L	W	W	W	L	W	D	W	D
Position	9	5	4	4	6	6	6	5	5	4	4	4	4	3	4	3	3	3	3	3	3	3	3	3	4	4	3	2	4	3	4	4	3

Source: Competitive matches
A = Away; H = Home; W = Win; D = Draw; L = Loss

=== Albanian Cup ===
==== First round ====
21 October 2009 First leg	Luzi 2008	3–1	Tirana	Luz i Vogël
				Stadium: Luz i Vogël Stadium

4 November 2009 Second leg	Tirana	3–0 (4–3 agg.)	Luzi 2008	Tirana
				Stadium: Selman Stërmasi Stadium

==== Second round ====
25 November 2009 First leg	Lushnja	2–2	Tirana	Lushnje
14:00 CET	Bizhytit 46'; E. Çela 90+4'		Memelli 27'; Abilaliaj 35'	Stadium: Abdurrahman Roza Haxhiu Stadium

9 December 2009 Second leg	Tirana	2–1 (4–3 agg.)	Lushnja	Tirana
13:00 CET	Ahmataj 22'; Sina 81'		Arbëri 90+2'	Stadium: Selman Stërmasi Stadium

==== Quarter-finals ====
10 February 2010 First leg	Besa	2–0	Tirana	Kavajë
13:30 CET	Mançaku 11' (pen.); Xhafa 78'			Stadium: Besa Stadium

24 February 2010 Second leg	Tirana	4–2 (4–4a agg.)	Besa	Tirana
13:30 CET	Ahmataj 47', 68'; Plaku 49'; Lila 51' (pen.)		Mançaku 72' (pen.); Xhafa 80'	Stadium: Qemal Stafa Stadium

=== UEFA Champions League ===
==== Second qualifying round ====
15 July 2009 First leg	Tirana (Albania)	1–1	(Norway) Stabæk	Tirana, Albania
20:00 CET	Mukaj 50'	Report	Kobayashi 34'	Stadium: Qemal Stafa Stadium; Attendance: 3,500; Referee: Robert Schörgenhofer (Austria)

21 July 2009 Second leg	Stabæk (Norway)	4–0 (5–1 agg.)	(Albania) Tirana	Bærum, Norway
20:45 CET	Segerström 15', 17'; Berglund 44'; Farnerud 55'	Report		Stadium: Telenor Arena; Attendance: 4,783; Referee: Thorsten Kinhöfer (Germany)

== Statistics ==
=== Squad statistics ===
No.	Pos.	Name	League		Albanian Cup		Europe		Supercup		Total		Discipline	
No.	Pos.	Name	Apps	Goals	Apps	Goals	Apps	Goals	Apps	Goals	Apps	Goals	Yellow card	Red card
1	GK	(Albania) Blendi Nallbani	2	1	0	0	2	0	1	0	5	1	0	0
3	DF	(Albania) Rezart Dabulla	2	0	0	0	2	0	1	0	5	0	2	0
4	MF	(France) Laurent Mohellebi	2	0	0	0	2(2)	0	1	0	5(2)	0	1	1
5	DF	(Albania) Entonio Pashaj	2	0	0	0	1	0	1	0	4	0	1	0
6	DF	(Albania) Andi Lila	1	0	0	0	2	0	1	0	4	0	2	1
7	MF	(Albania) Blerti Hajdari	1	0	0	0	1(1)	0	1	0	3(1)	0	0	0
8	MF	(Albania) Jetmir Sefa	2	0	0	0	2	0	1	0	5	0	0	0
9	FW	(Albania) Hendrit Ferra	1(1)	0	0	0	0	0	0	0	1(1)	0	0	0
10	FW	(Albania) Devis Mukaj	0	0	0	0	1	1	0	0	1	1	1	0
11	FW	(Albania) Ergys Sorra	0	0	0	0	0	0	0	0	0	0	0	0
12	GK	(North Macedonia) Pece Korunovski	0	0	0	0	0	0	0	0	0	0	0	0
13	MF	(Albania) Sajmir Patushi	0	0	0	0	1	0	0	0	1	0	0	0
14	MF	(Albania) Bledar Devolli	2	0	0	0	2	0	1	0	5	0	2	0
15	FW	(Albania) Migen Memelli	0	0	0	0	0	0	0	0	0	0	0	0
16	DF	(Nigeria) Abraham Alechenwu	2	0	0	0	2	0	1	0	5	0	0	0
17	MF	(Albania) Gjergji Muzaka	0	0	0	0	1	0	0	0	1	0	0	0
18	FW	(Albania) Erand Rica	0	0	0	0	0	0	0	0	0	0	0	0
19	DF	(Albania) Tefik Osmani	1	0	0	0	2	0	1	0	4	0	1	0
20	FW	(Albania) Arbër Abilaliaj	2	1	0	0	2(2)	0	1	1	5	2	2	0
23	MF	(Albania) Sabien Lila	2	0	0	0	2	0	1(1)	0	5(1)	0	0	0
27	MF	(Albania) Gerald Tusha	1(1)	0	0	0	0	0	0	0	1(1)	0	0	0
31	GK	(Albania) Klajdi Kuka	0	0	0	0	0	0	0	0	0	0	0	0
