= 2009 Albanian Cup final =

- Event: 2008–09 Albanian Cup
Tirana	Flamurtari
1	2
- Date: 6 May 2009
- Venue: Niko Dovana Stadium, Durrës
- Man of the Match: Hair Zeqiri (Flamurtari)
- Referee: Bardhyl Pashaj (Ballsh)
- Attendance: 10,000

The 2009 Albanian Cup final was the 57th final of the Albanian Cup. The final was played at Niko Dovana Stadium in Durrës on 6 May 2009. The match was contested by Tirana, who beat Elbasani in their semi-final, and Flamurtari who beat Shkumbini. After Rezart Dabulla opened the scoring with a header after 42 minutes, Devis Mema equalised in the 65th minute before Hair Zeqiri scored the winner in the 92nd minute to give Flamurtari their third Albanian Cup success.

== Match ==
=== Details ===
6 May 2009
16:00 CEST

Tirana	1–2	Flamurtari
Dabulla 42'		Mema 65'; Zeqiri 92'

Niko Dovana Stadium, Durrës
Attendance: 10,000
Referee: Bardhyl Pashaj (Ballsh)

KF Tirana	Flamurtari

Tirana:
GK	1	(Albania) Blendi Nallbani
RB	19	(Albania) Tefik Osmani	(substituted off) 46'
CB	3	(Albania) Rezart Dabulla
CB	21	(Croatia) Toni Pezo
LB	16	(Nigeria) Abraham
CM	14	(Albania) Bledar Devolli
CM	13	(Albania) Sajmir Patushi	(substituted off) 78'
RM	10	(Albania) Devis Mukaj (c)
LM	15	(Albania) Ansi Agolli
CF	22	(Albania) Daniel Xhafa
CF	9	(Albania) Migen Memelli
Substitutes:
GK	12	(North Macedonia) Pece Korunovski
MF	24	(Albania) Gjergji Muzaka	(substituted on) 46'
MF	8	(Albania) Jetmir Sefa	(substituted on) 78'
Manager:
(Albania) Agustin Kola

Flamurtari:
GK	1	(Albania) Shpëtim Moçka
RB	6	(Albania) Halim Begaj
CB	13	(Croatia) Branko Panic (c)
CB	33	(Albania) Orjand Beqiri
LB	11	(Albania) Franc Veliu
DM	20	(Albania) Taulant Kuqi
CM	14	(Albania) Ermir Strati	(substituted off) 54'
CM	8	(Croatia) Robert Alviz	(substituted off) 70'
LW	15	(Albania) Ilirjan Çaushaj
RW	19	(Albania) Hair Zeqiri
CF	9	(Albania) Devis Mema
Substitutes:
GK	12	(Albania) Klodian Xhelilaj
CF	23	(Albania) Ardit Shehaj	(substituted on) 54'
CF	10	(Croatia) Mate Brajkovic	(substituted on) 70'
Manager:
(Albania) Eqerem Memushi

MATCH RULES

- 90 minutes.
- 30 minutes of extra-time if necessary.
- Penalty shoot-out if scores still level.
- Seven named substitutes.
- Maximum of three substitutions.
