= 2006–07 KF Tirana season =

KF Tirana
2006–07 season
- Chairman: (Albania) Bamir Topi
- Manager: (Albania) Sulejman Starova
- Kategoria Superiore: 1st
- Albanian Cup: Quarter-finals
- Albanian Supercup: Winners
- UEFA Cup: 2nd Qualifying Round
- Top goalscorer: League: Vioresin Sinani (23); All: Vioresin Sinani (24)
Home colours	Away colours

The 2006-07 season was Klubi i Futbollit Tirana's 68th competitive season, 68th consecutive season in the Kategoria Superiore and 86th year in existence as a football club.

== Squad ==
Note: Flags indicate national team as defined under FIFA eligibility rules; some limited exceptions apply. Players may hold more than one non-FIFA nationality.

No.	Pos.	Nation	Player
1	GK	ALB	Blendi Nallbani
12	GK	ALB	Isli Hidi
—	GK	ALB	Gerti Sharra
—	DF	ALB	Nevil Dede
—	DF	ALB	Albert Duro
—	DF	ALB	Gentian Hajdari
—	DF	COL	Diómedes Peña
—	DF	ALB	Arjan Pisha
—	DF	ALB	Elvis Sina
—	DF	NGA	Abraham Alechenwu
—	DF	ALB	Engert Bakalli
8	MF	ALB	Ervin Bulku
—	MF	ALB	Hetlem Capja
—	MF	ALB	Florenc Arapi
—	MF	ALB	Serjan Fjolla
—	MF	ALB	Migen Metani

No.	Pos.	Nation	Player
—	MF	CMR	Abada Narcisse Fish
—	MF	ALB	Jetmir Sefa
—	MF	ALB	Oriand Abazaj
—	MF	ALB	Igli Allmuça
21	MF	ALB	Klodian Duro
—	MF	ALB	Eldorado Merkoçi
—	MF	ALB	Devis Mukaj (captain)
—	MF	ALB	Sajmir Patushi
—	MF	ALB	Enri Tafaj
—	MF	ALB	Fatjon Muhameti
—	MF	ALB	Cela
—	MF	ALB	Eleandro Pema
—	MF	ALB	Hamdi Salihi
—	MF	ALB	Vioresin Sinani
—	FW	ALB	Erald Turdiu
—	FW	ALB	Vilfor Hysa

== Competitions ==
=== Albanian Supercup ===
Win Draw Loss

19 August 2006 Final	Elbasani	0–2	Tirana	Durrës
			Salihi 24'; Mukaj 60'	Stadium: Niko Dovana Stadium; Attendance: 2,100; Referee: Tanush Latifi

=== Kategoria Superiore ===
==== League table ====
Pos	Team	Pld	W	D	L	GF	GA	GD	Pts	Qualification or relegation
1	Tirana (C)	33	22	6	5	64	33	+31	72	Qualification for the Champions League first qualifying round
2	Teuta	33	19	10	4	44	26	+18	67	Qualification for the UEFA Cup first qualifying round
3	Vllaznia	33	18	9	6	46	28	+18	63	Qualification for the Intertoto Cup first round
4	Partizani	33	17	6	10	44	25	+19	57	
5	Dinamo Tirana	33	14	5	14	41	39	+2	47	

Source: Albanian Football Association (in Albanian), Soccerway
Rules for classification: 1) points; 2) points in head-to-head matches; 3) goal difference in head-to-head matches; 4) goals scored in head-to-head matches; 5) total goal difference; 6) total goals scored; 7) draw
(C) Champions

==== Results summary ====
Overall								Home						Away					
Pld	W	D	L	GF	GA	GD	Pts	W	D	L	GF	GA	GD	W	D	L	GF	GA	GD
33	22	6	5	64	33	+31	72	14	2	1	40	15	+25	8	4	4	24	18	+6

Last updated: 31 January 2019.
Source: Competitive matches

==== Results by round ====
Round	1	2	3	4	5	6	7	8	9	10	11	12	13	14	15	16	17	18	19	20	21	22	23	24	25	26	27	28	29	30	31	32	33
Ground	A	H	A	H	A	H	A	H	A	A	H	H	A	H	A	H	A	H	A	H	H	A	H	A	H	A	H	A	H	A	H	A	H
Result	D	W	D	W	W	W	D	W	W	L	D	W	L	W	W	W	W	W	W	L	W	W	W	L	W	D	D	W	W	W	W	L	W
Position	5	2	3	3	1	1	1	1	1	1	1	1	1	1	1	1	1	1	1	1	1	1	1	1	1	1	1	1	1	1	1	1	1

Source: Competitive matches
A = Away; H = Home; W = Win; D = Draw; L = Loss

=== UEFA Cup ===
==== Qualifying phase ====
===== First qualifying round =====
13 July 2006 First leg	Varteks (Croatia)	1–1	(Albania) Tirana	Varaždin, Croatia
18:00 CET	Novinić 47'		Muka 21'; Allmuça (yellow card); Patushi (yellow card)	Stadium: Stadion Varteks; Attendance: 2,000; Referee: Björn Kuipers (Netherlands)

27 July 2006 Second leg	Tirana (Albania)	2–0 (3–1 agg.)	(Croatia) Varteks	Tirana, Albania
17:00 CET	Salihi 47'; Merkoçi 90'; Duro (yellow card) 0' (yellow-red card) 90'; Patushi (yellow card); Nallbani (yellow card)		Ipša (yellow card); Jertec (yellow card); Novinić (yellow card)	Stadium: Selman Stërmasi Stadium; Attendance: 3,000; Referee: Iraklis Tsikinis (Greece)

===== Second qualifying round =====
10 August 2006 First leg	Tirana (Albania)	0–2	(Turkey) Kayserispor	Tirana, Albania
17:30 CET	Bulku (yellow card); Peña (yellow card)		Akagündüz 26', 45'; Sadygov (yellow card); Johnson (yellow card); Ceylan (yellow card)	Stadium: Selman Stërmasi Stadium; Referee: Ferenc Bede (Hungary)

24 August 2006 Second leg	Kayserispor (Turkey)	3–1 (5–1 agg.)	(Albania) Tirana	Kayseri, Turkey
18:00 CET	Topuz 5'; Akagündüz 46'; Ünal 48'		Sina (yellow card); Salihi 52'; Duro (yellow card)	Stadium: Kayseri Atatürk Stadium; Referee: Sten Kaldma (Estonia)
