= Pezo =

Pezo is a Congolese and Spanish surname. Notable people with the name include:

- Leodan Pezo (1993), Peruvian boxer
- Toni Pezo (1987), Croatian football midfielder
