= Rezart Dabulla =

Albanian retired football player

Rezart Dabulla (Dabi)
Personal information
- Full name: Rezart Dabulla
- Date of birth: 24 October 1979 (age 47)
- Place of birth: Tirana, PSR Albania
- Height: 1.82 m (6 ft 0 in)
- Position: Defender

Senior career*
Years	Team	Apps	(Gls)
1996–1998	Lushnja	30	(0)
1998–2006	Tirana	196	(8)
2006–2007	Vllaznia	28	(0)
2007–2008	Shkumbini	25	(1)
2008–2013	Tirana	49	(1)
2013–2014	Lushnja	5	(0)

International career^{‡}
	Albania U-19	3	(1)
1999–2000	Albania U-21	5	(0)
1999–2003	Albania	5	(0)
- * Club domestic league appearances and goals as of 2012 ‡ National team caps and goals as of 2010

Rezart Dabulla (born 24 October 1979 in Tirana, nicknamed: Dabi) is an Albanian retired football player. His main position was centre-back but he could also play as a left full-back.

== Club career ==
=== Lushnja ===
Dabulla made his professional debut with KS Lushnja in the Albanian First Division during the 1996–1997 season. He played for the club until the end of the 1998–1999 season when he was offered a move to Albania's biggest club, KF Tirana. Dabulla made the move to the capital at the age of just 19 after having broken into the Lushnja first team the previous season.

=== KF Tirana ===
He had immediate success despite having to compete with players such as Nevil Dede, Alpin Gallo, Elvis Sina and Alban Tafaj. After nearly 200 appearances for the club, Dabulla decided to leave Tirana and join KS Vllaznia Shkodër before the start of the Kategoria superiore 2006-07 season.

=== Vllaznia ===
The German coach Ulrich Schulze was impressed by Dabulla's play and attitude. He was part of a defence that included homegrown players Admir Teli and Safet Osja and Montenegrin Nikola Vukčević. After a season with Vllaznia Dabulla decided on a move to an ambitious KS Shkumbini Peqin side.

=== Lushnja ===
He was brought in to lead the defence alongside the experienced player Lorenc Pasha at his first ever club Lushnja. With Dabulla solid in defence for most of the season, Shkumbini finished fifth in the final league table.

=== Return to Tirana ===
After a successful season with Shkumbini, Dabulla was bought by KF Tirana, where he had previously spent seven season. He was brought in by Bosnian coach Blaž Slišković and the new chairman of Tirana, Refik Halili to replace the gap in defence provided by the departures of Endrit Vrapi and Engert Bakalli to their rivals KF Elbasani and the retirement of the legendary defender Gentian Hajdari. The 2008–2009 season was successful for Debulla as he helped his side win the Albanian Superliga and the final of the Albanian Cup. He played most of the season at centre back alongside Tefik Osmani, but he did also fill in at left back when the Nigerian defender Abraham Alechenwu was not available. He made 24 league appearances that season and helped Tirana win their 23rd league title, more than any other club in Albania.

In the Albanian Cup 2008–09 Dabulla played in every round of the competition, including the first round draw against the lower league side, KS Tërbuni Pukë which Tirana drew. He also played in the next round in the 5–0 defeat of his previous club Lushnja, a match in which the striker Migen Memelli scored all 5 goals. Despite managerial changes at the club, Dabulla managed to get into the starting line-up for the final which was held at teuta Durres's home ground, Stadioni Niko Dovana, against Flamurtari Vlore. Dabulla opened the scoring in the 42nd minute when he headed in a corner from captain Devis Mukaj. However, a late Flamurtari comeback meant that Tirana narrowly missed completing the double.

== International career ==
Dabulla has also played for the Albania National Team on five occasions from 1998 until 2004. In his early career he was also a member of the Albanian U-21 National Team, playing two official games. His first cap for the national team was on 10 February 1999 in a friendly against neighbouring Macedonia. He was selected by the legendary coach Medin Zhega who was manager of Albania at the time, for a friendly match at the Qemal Stafa Stadium in Tirana in front of a crowd of just over 6,000. Dabulla came on as a substitute in the 65th minute of the game for Redi Jupi when the score was 1–0 to Albania. The match ended 2–0 to Albania. His next international game came against Andorra in the Malta International Football Tournament 2000 on 6 February 2000. Once again under the guidance of Zhega, Dabulla was picked for the game but this time he played the full 90 minutes. He helped his team to a comfortable 3–0 victory against a weak Andorra side, with the goals coming from Edmond Dalipi, Rudi Vata and Roland Zajmi. Dabulla was part of the Albanian team that famously won the tournament in 2000 although he only played in one game out of a possible three. Hs next game was a friendly played in San Diego, US, against Mexico. Dabulla once again started and played the entire 90 minutes, but this time Albania suffered a 4–0 defeat. Albania fielded their so-called 'B' team for this fixture that included many uncapped players. Albania also had the defender Ardit Beqiri sent off just before half time. Dabulla had to wait for more than a year for his next cap which was in Sofia against Bulgaria. Dabulla's involvement in the game was minimal as he came on as a substitute for Nevil Dede in the 90th minute. Albania lost the match 2–0 as a result of two Dimitar Berbatov goals in the opening 34 minutes. His last international, like his first, was against Macedonia, this time in Prilep, Macedonia. Dabulla once again began the match on the substitutes' bench before being brought on by the German coach Hans-Peter Briegel in the 86th minute for Adrian Aliaj. The match ended 3–1 to Macedonia.

=== National team statistics ===
Albania national team
Year	Apps	Goals
1999	1	0
2000	1	0
2001	0	0
2002	1	0
2003	2	0
Total	5	0
