= Safet =

Safet is an Albanian and Bosnian masculine given name. It may refer to:

- Safet Isović, Bosnian sevdalinka performer
- Safet Jahič, Slovenian footballer
- Safet Nadarević, Bosnian footballer
- Safet Osja, Albanian footballer
- Safet Plakalo, Bosnian playwright
- Safet Sušić, Bosnian football coach and former player
- Safvet-beg Bašagić, Bosnian writer
