= 2008–09 Albanian Cup =

Kupa e Shqipërisë

Tournament details
- Country: Albania

Final positions
- Champions: Flamurtari
- Runners-up: Tirana

Tournament statistics
- Top goal scorer(s): Migen Memelli (8 goals)

2008–09 Albanian Cup (Albanian: Kupa e Shqipërisë) was the fifty-seventh season of Albania's annual cup competition. It began on September 24, 2008 with the First Preliminary Round and ended on May 6, 2009 with the Final. The winners of the competition qualified for the second qualifying round of the UEFA Europa League. Vllaznia were the defending champions.

The rounds were played in a two-legged format similar to those of European competitions. If the aggregated score was tied after both games, the team with the higher number of away goals advanced. If the number of away goals was equal in both games, the match was decided by extra time and a penalty shootout, if necessary.

== Preliminary Tournament ==
In order to reduce the number of participating teams for the First Round to 32, a preliminary tournament was played. Only teams from the Kategoria e Dytë (III) were allowed to enter. Each Kategoria e Dytë group played its own tournament. In contrast to the main tournament, the preliminary tournament was held as a single-leg knock-out competition.

=== First Preliminary Round ===
Games were played on September 24, 2008.

Team 1	Score	Team 2
Northern Group
Erzeni	2–1	Olimpik
Gramshi	3–1 (a.e.t.)	Çlirimi
Albpetrol	w/o	Egnatia
Iliria	w/o	Veleçiku
Southern Group
Tomori	3–0	Butrinti
Tepelena	4–0	Këlcyra
Vlora	5–1	Domozdova
Memaliaj	w/o	Pojani

=== Second Preliminary Round ===
Games were played on October 2, 2008.

Team 1	Score	Team 2
Northern Group
Erzeni	0–1	Iliria
Gramshi	1–2 (a.e.t.)	Albpetrol
Southern Group
Tomori	6–0	Memaliaj
Tepelena	2–0	Vlora

== First round ==
All twenty-eight teams of the 2008–09 Kategoria Superiore and Kategoria e Parë entered in this round. First legs were played on October 29, 2008 and the second legs were played on November 12, 2008.

Team 1	Agg.	Team 2	1st leg	2nd leg
Albpetrol	0–1	Dinamo Tirana	0–1	/
Iliria	0–6	Besa	0–2	0–4
Gramozi	0–6	Shkumbini	0–2	0–4
Sopoti	1–8	Vllaznia	0–4	1–4
Pogradeci	0–3	Teuta	0–1	0–2
Dajti	0–8	Apolonia	0–3	0–5
Luftëtari	1–3	Kastrioti	1–1	0–2
Laçi	3–4	Skënderbeu	2–1	1–3
Tepelena	1–5	Partizani	1–5	/
Tomori	1–8	Elbasani	1–3	0–5
Tërbuni	1–2	Tirana	1–1	0–1
Naftëtari	3–9	Flamurtari	1–6	2–3
Bilisht Sport	0–4	Bylis	0–1	0–3
Turbina	0–2	Lushnja	0–0	0–2
Skrapari	3–4	Besëlidhja	2–2	1–2
Ada	1–2	Burreli	1–1	0–1

== Second round ==
In this round entered winners from the previous round. First legs were played on December 3, 2008 and the second legs were played on December 17, 2008.

Team 1	Agg.	Team 2	1st leg	2nd leg
Skënderbeu	1–4	Dinamo Tirana	1–0	0–4
Kastrioti	1–5	Besa	1–2	0–3
Apolonia	0–2	Shkumbini	0–0	0–2
Teuta	2–3	Vllaznia	1–0	1–3
Burreli	0–6	Partizani	0–1	0–5
Besëlidhja	2–4	Elbasani	2–2	0–2
Lushnja	1–9	Tirana	1–4	0–5
Bylis	2–3	Flamurtari	1–1	1–2

== Quarter-finals ==
First legs were played on February 25, 2009 and the second legs were played on March 11, 2009.

Team 1	Agg.	Team 2	1st leg	2nd leg
Vllaznia	3–2^{1}	Dinamo Tirana	1–2	2–0^{1}
Shkumbini	2–1	Besa	1–1	1–0
Tirana	2–0	Elbasani	0–0	2–0

^{1}Dinamo Tirana were excluded from the Cup because they fielded Elis Bakaj although he previously played in the Cup for Partizani. Second leg's 0–0 score was annulled and Vllaznia were awarded a 2–0 win.

Two-legged results of Flamurtari–Partizani match (1–0; 0–1 aet, p. 4–5) were cancelled due to both teams fielding players that previously played in the Cup for other teams. Flamurtari's Eriol Merxha played for Elbasani while Partizani's Genti Gjondedaj and Engert Bakalli played for Teuta and Elbasani, respectively. The match was one-legged, played on Stadiumi Niko Dovana, Durrës on April 8, 2009.

Team 1	Score	Team 2
Partizani	0–1	Flamurtari

== Semi-finals ==
First legs were played on April 15, 2009 and the second legs were played on April 29, 2009.

Team 1	Agg.	Team 2	1st leg	2nd leg
Vllaznia	0–1	Tirana	0–0	0–1 (a.e.t.)
Flamurtari	2–1	Shkumbini	1–0	1–1

15 April 2009	Vllaznia	0–0	Tirana	Loro Boriçi Stadium, Shkodër
18:30 CEST

29 April 2009	Tirana	1–0 (a.e.t.)	Vllaznia	Selman Stermasi Stadium, Tirana
18:30 CEST	Sefa 105'

Tirana advanced to the final.

15 April 2009	Flamurtari	1–0	Shkumbini	Flamurtari Stadium, Vlorë
16:30 CEST	Begaj 28'

29 April 2009	Shkumbini	1–1	Flamurtari	Shkumbini Stadium, Peqin
16:30 CEST	Xhyra 45'		Mema 56'

Flamurtari advanced to the final.

== Final ==
6 May 2009
16:00 CEST

Tirana	1–2	Flamurtari
Dabulla 42'	Report (in Albanian)	Mema 65'; Zeqiri 90+2'

Stadiumi Niko Dovana, Durrës
Attendance: 12,000
Referee: Bardhyl Pashaj
