= Laert Ndoni =

Albanian footballer

Personal information
- Full name: Laert Ndoni
- Date of birth: 11 April 1984 (age 42)
- Place of birth: Lushnjë, Albania
- Position: Midfielder

Senior career*
Years	Team	Apps	(Gls)
2004–2006	Lushnja	20	(0)
2006–2008	Shkumbini	52	(0)
2008–2009	Lushnja	27	(0)
2009–2011	Kamza	34	(0)
2011	Besa	10	(0)
2012	Skrapari	2	(0)
2012–2015	Lushnja	74	(1)
- * Club domestic league appearances and goals

Laert Ndoni (born 11 April 1984 in Lushnjë) is an Albanian footballer who currently plays as a midfielder for KS Lushnja in the Albanian First Division.
