= Migen Metani =

Albanian footballer

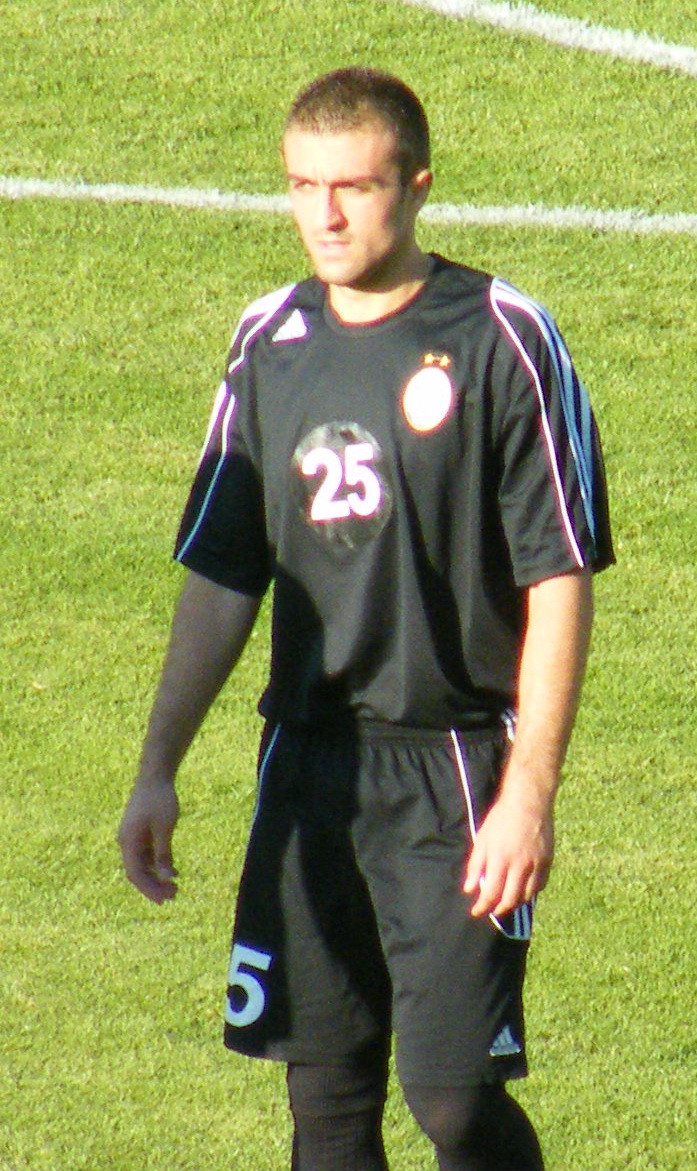

Personal information
- Date of birth: 5 May 1989 (age 37)
- Place of birth: Tirana, Albania
- Position: Midfielder

Team information
- Current team: Tërbuni Puke
- Number: 20

Youth career
- 2004–2007: KF Tirana

Senior career*
Years	Team	Apps	(Gls)
2007–2010	Tirana	5	(0)
2009–2010	→ Gramozi (loan)	20	(1)
2011	→ Kastrioti (loan)	1	(0)
2011–2012	Teuta	2	(0)
2012–2014	Tërbuni	17	(0)
2015–2018	Gramshi		
2018–	Tërbuni		

International career
2007–2008	Albania U-19	6	(1)
- Albania U-21
- * Club domestic league appearances and goals as of 19 May 2010

Migen Metani (born 5 May 1989) is an Albanian football player. He currently plays as a midfielder for Tërbuni Puke in the Albanian First Division.

== KF Tirana ==
Metani made his league debut for KF Tirana on 27 September 2008, in a match against KS Flamurtari Vlore, when the 19-year-old midfielder came on for Hat Trick Hero Migen Memelli on the 78th minute. In the 2008–2009 season he made 3 league appearances, all of them as a substitute. He has so far played 37 minutes in the Albanian Superliga.

== Teuta Durres ==
He signed for Teuta Durres on 22 June 2011 after struggling to fight for a place in the KF Tirana squad.

=== Career statistics ===
Club performance			League		Cup		Continental		Total	
Season	Club	League	Apps	Goals	Apps	Goals	Apps	Goals	Apps	Goals
Albania			League		Albanian Cup		Europe		Total	
2008–09	Tirana	Superliga	4	0	3	0	0	0	8	0
2009–10	Gramozi	Superliga	6	0	1	0	0	0	1	0
