= Gentian Çela =

Albanian footballer

Personal information
- Full name: Gentian Çela
- Date of birth: 9 February 1981 (age 45)
- Place of birth: Lushnjë, Albania
- Position: Midfielder

Team information
- Current team: Lushnja
- Number: 10

Senior career*
Years	Team	Apps	(Gls)
2000–2004	Lushnja	43	(1)
2004–2005	Shkumbini	20	(1)
2005–2006	Besa Kavajë	13	(0)
2006–2010	Lushnja	85	(16)
2010–2011	Shkumbini	9	(0)
2011–	Lushnja	122	(14)
- * Club domestic league appearances and goals as of 8 February 2019

Gentian Çela (born 9 February 1981, in Lushnjë) is an Albanian footballer who currently plays as a midfielder for KS Lushnja in the Albanian Superliga.
