= Ahmed Mujdragić =

Serbian footballer

Personal information
- Date of birth: 13 March 1986 (age 40)
- Place of birth: Novi Pazar, SFR Yugoslavia
- Height: 1.87 m (6 ft 1 1/2 in)
- Position: Centre back

Youth career
- Novi Pazar

Senior career*
Years	Team	Apps	(Gls)
2004–2008	Novi Pazar	125	(3)
2009–2011	Shkumbini	76	(3)
2011–2012	Hajduk Kula	25	(1)
2012–2013	Novi Pazar	12	(0)
2013–2014	Čelik Nikšić	21	(4)
2014–2015	Gaz Metan Mediaș	14	(0)
2016–2017	KÍ Klaksvík	43	(4)
2018	Skála	19	(0)
Total		335	(15)
- * Club domestic league appearances and goals

Ahmed Mujdragić (Serbian Cyrillic: Ахмед Мујдрагић; born 13 March 1986) is a Serbian footballer.

Mujdragić signed for Faroese powerhouse KÍ Klaksvík in November 2015.
