= Enri Tafaj =

Albanian footballer

Personal information
- Date of birth: 22 May 1989 (age 37)
- Place of birth: Tirana, Albania
- Position: Defender

Youth career
- 2005–2007: KF Tirana

Senior career*
Years	Team	Apps	(Gls)
2007–2009	Tirana	1	(0)
2009–2012	Kamza	61	(5)
2010	→ Laçi (loan)	0	(0)
2012–2013	Tomori Berat	13	(0)
2013	Partizani Tirana	8	(0)
2013–2015	Dinamo Tirana	40	(1)

International career^{‡}
2007–2008	Albania U-19	0	(0)
- * Club domestic league appearances and goals as of 21 March 2015 ‡ National team caps and goals as of 6 June 2009

Enri Tafaj (born 22 May 1989) is an Albanian professional footballer who plays as a midfielder.

== Club career ==
Tafaj began his career in 2007 with KF Tirana after working his way up through the youth setup at the club. He joined up with the first team during the winter break in the 2006–07 season. He made his league debut with KF Tirana in round 32 of the 2006–07 Albanian Superliga season on 12 May 2007. The match was against Teuta Durres at the Niko Dovana Stadium. Tafaj started the game and played the whole 90 minutes.

He made no further Superliga appearances for Tirana, and in January 2009 he joined KS Dajti on loan for the rest of the season to gain experience.

He then moved to FC Kamza, as KS Dajti had been renamed. He spent the early part of the 2010–11 season on loan at Laçi, but played only once, in a 7–1 defeat in the second leg of the Europa League first qualifying round match against Dnepr Mogilev. In the 2011–12 Superliga season, Tafaj played regularly for Kamza. He scored only once, a late consolation in a 2–1 defeat at Pogradeci. He took part in the relegation "play-out", as Kamza lost to Besa Tavaje to return to the First Division after just one season.

Tafaj returned to pre-season training with Kamza, but joined Superliga side Tomori Berat before the start of the 2012–13 season, where he was converted from midfielder to defender.

== International career ==
Tafaj was called up to the Albania under-19 team for the Slovakia Cup tournament in April and May 2007, and also played twice in qualifying for the UEFA under-19 championships. In October 2008, he was called up to the Albania under-21 team to face their Macedonian counterparts, but took no part in the match.
