= Hair Zeqiri =

Albanian footballer

Personal information
- Full name: Hair Zeqiri
- Date of birth: 11 October 1988 (age 38)
- Place of birth: Vlorë, Albania
- Height: 1.90 m (6 ft 3 in)
- Position: Midfielder

Youth career
- 2000–2006: Flamurtari Vlorë

Senior career*
| Years | Team | Apps | (Gls) |
| 2006–2011 | Flamurtari | 97 | (4) |
| 2011–2012 | Çaykur Rizespor | 20 | (0) |
| 2012–2014 | Flamurtari | 35 | (6) |
| 2014–2015 | Kukësi | 33 | (4) |
| 2015–2017 | Flamurtari | 22 | (1) |
| 2017 | Kukësi | 5 | (0) |
| 2018 | Kamza | 0 | (0) |

International career^{‡}
| 2006–2010 | Albania U-21 | 6 | (1) |
| 2012 | Albania | 4 | (0) |
- * Club domestic league appearances and goals as of 13 January 2018 ‡ National team caps and goals as of 15 August 2012

Hair Zeqiri (born 11 October 1988) is an Albanian retired footballer who played as a midfielder for Flamurtari Vlore in the Albanian Superliga.

== Club career ==
=== Flamurtari Vlorë ===
Zeqiri is a product of the Flamurtari Vlorë academy where he was promoted to the first team for the 2006–07 season. In total he made 92 Albanian Superliga appearances between 2006 and 2011 with Flamurtari Vlorë.

=== Çaykur Rizespor ===
Zeqiri signed a three-year contract with Çaykur Rizespor on 26 June 2011 worth €450,000 plus bonuses.

=== Kukësi ===
On 30 July 2014, Zeqiri joined fellow Albanian Superliga side Kukësi by penning a one-year contract worth €80,000.

=== Second return to Flamurtari Vlorë ===
On 30 August 2015, Zeqiri completed a transfer to his first club Flamurtari Vlorë, returning for the second time. On 1 February 2017, Zeqiri played 84 minutes in the returning leg of Albanian Cup quarter-final against Besëlidhja Lezhë, which ended in a 1–2 home shock loss, which brought the elimination from the competition. After the match, while at dressing room, he had a clash with club administrator Sinan Idrizi, which resulted him being suspended. It was reported by the media that Zeqiri accused Idrizi of treating players in double standards. As the debate went on, Izridi told Zeqiri to leave the room, as he was no longer in his plans, but he (Zeqiri) refused, telling to send him a release note. On 3 February, he was also told that he was going to train with the youth time until a second decision. On 11 February, he was officially released by the club, thus becoming a free agent.

=== Return to Kukësi ===
On 17 June 2017, Zeqiri reached an agreement with his former side Kukësi for the next season. Three days later, he transfer was made official and the player signed a two-year contract with the club, and was handed squad number 7. He stated: "I'm very happy to be signing with Kukësi. Representation of northeastern team is a honour for me and I'm happy to cooperate again with the champions. I promise the fans that I will give my maximum. He started the season by appearing in the two-legged match against Sheriff Tiraspol for the 2017–18 UEFA Champions League second qualifying round, playing both matches as Kukësi were eliminated on away goal rule. Zeqiri started the domestic season as Kukësi fell 0–1 to Tirana in the 2017 Albanian Supercup. On 9 October, it was confirmed that Zeqiri will be sidelined for 3 weeks due to thigh injury. On 21 November, Zeqiri parted company with Kukësi after handing a transfer request.

=== Kamza ===
After two months unemployed, Zeqiri agreed personal terms and joined Kamza on a six-month contract, only to force a departure from the club 3 weeks later.

== International career ==
Zeqiri was a member of the under-21 national team, where he earned six caps and scored one goal. He was first called up to the senior team in 2012 by Gianni De Biasi for a friendly against Georgia on 29 February. He featured in the game as a substitute in the 55th minute for Jahmir Hyka. He earned a total of 4 caps, scoring no goals. His final international was an August 2012 friendly match against Moldova.

== Career statistics ==
=== Club ===
As of 16 November 2017

Club statistics
| Club | Season | League | | | Cup | | Continental | | Other | | Total | |
| Club | Season | Division | Apps | Goals | Apps | Goals | Apps | Goals | Apps | Goals | Apps | Goals |
|---|---|---|---|---|---|---|---|---|---|---|---|---|
| Flamurtari Vlorë | 2006–07 | Albanian Superliga | 9 | 0 | 0 | 0 | — | | — | | 9 | 0 |
| Flamurtari Vlorë | 2007–08 | Albanian Superliga | 26 | 1 | 0 | 0 | — | | — | | 26 | 1 |
| Flamurtari Vlorë | 2008–09 | Albanian Superliga | 11 | 0 | 3 | 1 | — | | — | | 14 | 1 |
| Flamurtari Vlorë | 2009–10 | Albanian Superliga | 26 | 3 | 0 | 0 | 2 (Note: All appearance(s) in UEFA Europa League) | 0 | 1 (Note: Appearance in Albanian Supercup) | 0 | 29 | 3 |
| Flamurtari Vlorë | 2010–11 | Albanian Superliga | 25 | 0 | 1 | 0 | — | | — | | 26 | 0 |
| Flamurtari Vlorë | Total | | 97 | 4 | 4 | 1 | 2 | 0 | 1 | 0 | 104 | 5 |
| Çaykur Rizespor | 2011–12 | TFF Second League | 20 | 0 | 2 | 1 | — | | — | | 22 | 1 |
| Flamurtari Vlorë | 2012–13 | Albanian Superliga | 10 | 1 | 7 | 1 | 0 | 0 | — | | 17 | 2 |
| Flamurtari Vlorë | 2013–14 | Albanian Superliga | 25 | 5 | 5 | 0 | — | | — | | 30 | 5 |
| Flamurtari Vlorë | 2014–15 | Albanian Superliga | — | | — | | 4 | 0 | — | | 4 | 0 |
| Flamurtari Vlorë | Total | | 35 | 6 | 12 | 1 | 4 | 0 | — | | 51 | 6 |
| Kukësi | 2014–15 | Albanian Superliga | 33 | 4 | 3 | 0 | — | | — | | 36 | 4 |
| Flamurtari Vlorë | 2015–16 | Albanian Superliga | 6 | 1 | 1 | 1 | — | | — | | 7 | 2 |
| Flamurtari Vlorë | 2016–17 | Albanian Superliga | 16 | 0 | 3 | 0 | — | | — | | 19 | 0 |
| Flamurtari Vlorë | Total | | 22 | 1 | 4 | 1 | — | | — | | 26 | 2 |
| Kukësi | 2017–18 | Albanian Superliga | 5 | 0 | 1 | 0 | 2 (Note: All appearance(s) in UEFA Champions League) | 0 | 1 | 0 | 9 | 0 |
| Career total | | | 212 | 15 | 26 | 4 | 8 | 0 | 2 | 0 | 248 | 19 |

=== International ===
As of match played 15 August 2012

Appearances and goals by national team and year
| National team | Year | Apps | Goals |
|---|---|---|---|
| Albania | 2012 | 4 | 0 |
| Total | | 4 | 0 |

== Honours ==
=== Club ===
Flamurtari Vlorë

- Albanian Cup: 2008–09, 2013–14

=== Individual ===
- Albanian Superliga Player of the Month: September 2010, November 2013
