= Florenc Arapi =

Albanian football player

Personal information
- Date of birth: 12 October 1985 (age 41)
- Place of birth: Albania
- Position: Midfielder

Team information
- Current team: KF Tirana
- Number: 17

Youth career
- 2003–2007: Dinamo Tirana

Senior career*
Years	Team	Apps	(Gls)
2007– 2008	KF Tirana	40	(4)
2009	→ KS Bylis Ballsh (loan)	12	(1)
- * Club domestic league appearances and goals as of 6 June 2009 ‡ National team caps and goals as of 6 June 2009

Florenc Arapi (born 12 October 1985) is an Albanian football player.

== Career ==
Arapi was a Dinamo Tirana player from 2003 to January 2007. He did not have any success with the club and so moved to KF Tirana in January 2007. During the 2006–2007 season he managed to play five games for his new club, starting one of them. He became a regular first team player in the 2007–2008 season and played 27 games, scoring four goals. In the 2008–2009 season Arapi was less successful at KF Tirana, and with the arrival of players like Gjergji Muzaka, Bledar Devolli and Ansi Agolli, Arapi fell down the pecking list at the club. This opted for a loan move to KS Bylis Ballsh in January 2009. Following his loan move he quickly settled in and became one of the club's best players. Arapi played twelve games and scored one goal during the six-month loan.
