= Agustin Kola =

Albanian footballer (born 1959)

Personal information
- Date of birth: 10 May 1959 (age 67)
- Place of birth: Tirana, Albania
- Height: 1.82 m (6 ft 0 in)
- Position: Striker

Senior career*
Years	Team	Apps	(Gls)
1977–1978	Shkëndija		(2)
1978–1979	17 Nëntori Tirana		(7)
1979–1980	Shkëndija		(5)
1980–1991	17 Nëntori Tirana	260	(113)
1991–1992	Egaleo		
1994–1997	Tirana	38	(13)

International career
1980–1994	Albania	22	(1)

Managerial career
- 1998: Shkumbini
- 2008–2009: Tirana
- 2009–2010: Kamza
- 2010–2011: Tirana U-17
- 2011–2014: Tirana U-19
- 2012: Skrapari
- 2015: Adriatiku Mamurras
- * Club domestic league appearances and goals

Agustin Kola (born 10 May 1959), is an Albanian professional football coach and retired player.

He played most of his career at 17 Nëntori Tirana where he established himself as one of the greatest strikers of his generation, winning several individual and collective awards. Towards the end of his career, Kola moved for the first time abroad following the fall of communism, by signing with Greece's Egaleo alongside compatriot Adrian Barbullushi. He played there for only one season before returning to the renamed KF Tirana once again to play until his retirement.

== Club career ==
After spending some of his teen years at the Tirana Circus, as an acrobat, and also excelling in swimming, Kola was seen playing football by then middle school teacher Aurel Veria, who referred him to Kola's first coach at KF Tirana's youth, Enver Rada. Kola was then 13 years old. At 14, he excelled at the youth Spartakiad and, given his acrobatic mastery, his role was goalkeeper. However, after his team was losing 0–1, he told one of the defenders to go and become goalie and went himself to attack. Coach Rada didn't have time to recall his undisciplined player because Kola scored the drawing goal, and soon after helped one of his teammates score the winner. From that game on, Kola never played as a goalie anymore, but became a forward.

Without consulting or letting anyone know, at 14, he applied and passed a scrimmage at the Sports mastery school Loro Boriçi, a high school specializing in producing young football players.

Kola will be remembered by the KF Tirana fans as one of its players for his successful times of the game. Several times Kola played even injured for his team and managed to overturn the fate of the game into a Tirana win. He was part of Nëntori Tirana's generation along with players such as Arben Minga, Mirel Josa, Sulejman Mema, Shkëlqim Muça and Bedri Omuri. His partnership up front with Minga made the attacking power of KF Tirana one of the tactical approach of the Albanian football. Kola has won 8 Albanian Superliga seasons and 8 Albanian Cups while at KF Tirana.

In Greece, he also played for Kallithea and PAS Giannina.

== International career ==
He made his debut for Albania in a December 1980 FIFA World Cup qualification match at home against Austria and earned a total of 22 caps, scoring 1 goal. His final international was a September 1994 European Championship qualification match against Wales.

== Managerial career ==
Kola's managerial career begun in the 2008–09 season with Tirana, taking charge on 12 December 2008 and leading the team until 7 May, resigning just two matches before the end of the season after losing the 2009 Albanian Cup final to Flamurtari Vlorë. However, the team won their 24th championship with Kola becoming a big factor with his presence as a coach during that season.

== Retirement ==
=== Charity activities ===
On 7 May 2015, Kola took part in a charity match played at Elbasan Arena as part of the Albania Legends vs. Germany Legends. He played in the match and notably scored a Panenka-style penalty in the first match as Albania lost 4–3, a photocopy of the 1997 match.

== Career statistics ==
=== Goals in Albanian Championship ===
Season	Team	Goals
1977-78	Shkëndija	2
1978-79	SK Tirana	7
1979-80	Shkëndija	5
1980-81	SK Tirana	6
1981-82	SK Tirana	10
1982-83	SK Tirana	7
1983-84	SK Tirana	4
1984-85	SK Tirana	10
1985-86	SK Tirana	13
1986-87	SK Tirana	13
1987-88	SK Tirana	18
1988-89	SK Tirana	19
1989-90	SK Tirana	9
1990-91	SK Tirana	4
1991-92	Egaleo	
1992-93	Egaleo (?)	
1993-94	Egaleo (?)	
1994-95	SK Tirana	11
1996-97	SK Tirana	2
TOTAL		140

=== International ===
Appearances and goals by national team and year
National team	Year	Apps	Goals
Albania	1980	1	0
Albania	1981	2	0
Albania	1982	3	0
Albania	1983	1	0
Albania	1984	3	1
Albania	1985	4	0
Albania	1986	2	0
Albania	1988	2	0
Albania	1991	2	0
Albania	1992	1	0
Albania	1994	1	0
Total		22	1
