= Norion Spaho =

Albanian footballer (born 1986)

Personal information
- Full name: Norjon Spaho
- Date of birth: 11 June 1986 (age 40)
- Place of birth: Albania
- Position: Defender

Senior career*
Years	Team	Apps	(Gls)
2007–2010	Apolonia	31	(0)
2010–2011	Flamurtari	1	(0)
- * Club domestic league appearances and goals as of 19 May 2010

Norion Spaho (born 11 June 1986) is an Albanian football player.
