= Migen Memelli =

Albanian footballer (born 1980)

Personal information
- Date of birth: 25 April 1980 (age 46)
- Place of birth: Pogradec, PSR Albania
- Height: 1.87 m (6 ft 2 in)
- Position: Striker

Youth career
- 1998–2000: Skënderbeu

Senior career*
Years	Team	Apps	(Gls)
1999–2001	Skënderbeu	26	(9)
2001–2003	Teuta	40	(13)
2003–2004	Elbasani	46	(12)
2004	Laçi	29	(4)
2005	Elbasani	17	(6)
2005	Skënderbeu	12	(8)
2006	Brann	19	(1)
2007–2009	GAIS	17	(0)
2008–2009	→ Tirana (loan)	38	(23)
2010	Flamurtari	15	(14)
2010–2011	Al-Faisaly	23	(14)
2011–2012	Al Taawon	20	(4)
2012–2013	Flamurtari	22	(19)
2013	Al-Faisaly	13	(1)
2014	Partizani	11	(6)
2014	Laçi	11	(1)
2015	Kastrioti	0	(0)
Total		317	(127)

International career
2001–2003	Albania U21	4	(1)
2009	Albania	1	(0)

Managerial career
- 2016–2017: Tirana B
- 2018: Laçi
- 2019–2020: Tirana U19
- 2021−2022: Skënderbeu
- 2022: Skënderbeu
- 2023: Vllaznia
- * Club domestic league appearances and goals

Migen Memelli (born 25 April 1980) is an Albanian professional football coach and a former player.

Regarded as one of the best strikers of Albanian football, he was known for his goalscoring ability, and has twice been the top goalscorer in the Kategoria Superiore.

== Club career ==
=== Early career ===
Memelli began his professional career with Skënderbeu in 1999 as a 19-year-old, where he scored 9 goals in 26 league games but could not help his side further as they finished bottom of the table and were subsequently relegated from the Kategoria Superiore. He also scored three times in the Albanian Cup which took his tally to 12 goals for the season in all competitions. He left the club following their relegation and joined Superiore side Teuta in the summer transfer window of 2001, netting 4 times in 19 games in his first season to help his side finish in a respectable 4th place in the league. He also scored another four goals in the Albanian Cup as Teuta reached the semi-finals. The following season he scored 8 goals in 21 league games as Teuta finished 4th once again. He also scored three goals in the Albanian Cup as his side reached the final, which they eventually lost 1–0 to Dinamo Tirana, as he came on as a 63rd minute for Gentian Begeja in the final.

He moved to Elbasani in 2003 and immediately became a first team player, netting 12 league goals in 29 games as the team finished one place above the relegation zone. In the Albanian Cup he scored a first half hat-trick against Devolli, and added another goal against Albpetrol as he reached the quarter-finals, and ended the season with 16 goals in all competitions. He joined newly promoted side Laçi in 2004 but did not have a fruitful experience, only featuring in four league games and scoring just once before returning to Elbasani in January 2005. He helped the club finish runners-up in the league with his 4 goals in 17 games, as well as scoring another goal in the Albanian Cup quarter finals as his side were knocked out by Teuta, taking his goal tally for season to six goals in all competitions for both clubs, the lowest of his career at the time. He rejoined Skënderbeu ahead of the 2005–06 campaign, and he scored on his second debut with the club in the first week of the Kategoria Superiore in a 1–1 draw with Teuta. He scored 8 goals in 12 games in the first half of the season which attracted the interest of several foreign clubs, which included Norwegian side Brann who offered the player a trial in January 2006.

=== Brann ===
His agent Knut Høibraatens arranged the trial with Brann, which was eventually resulted in a permanent move in March 2006 following a transfer fee of 600,000 kr.

Memelli scored his first cup goals for the club on 8 June 2006 in the 4–0 away win versus Voss. The next month, he played with the club in the 2006–07 UEFA Cup qualifying rounds, netting the winner in the leg of first qualifying round tie versus Glentoran. He was also named Man of the Match for the performance. Memelli was on the score-sheet again in the competition, netting a sensational hat-trick in the 3–3 home draw against Swedish side Åtvidaberg in the first leg of second qualifying round. Memelli missed the second leg due to injury, as Brann didn't go more than a 1–1 at Värendsvallen which confirmed their elimination from the competition through away goal rule.

Memelli returned on action for the league match against Molde by entering as a second-half substitute and providing the assist of the second goal for a 2–1 home win.

=== GAIS ===
GAIS acquired the services of Memelli on 28 March 2007 for €320,000 with the player signing a three-year contract. He got off to a very good start as he scored four goals in four pre-season games. In the Allsvenskan, Memelli went scoreless in all his 16 appearances. After scoring two goals in two pre-seasons matches, he got injured at the start of the 2008 season.

=== Tirana ===
==== 2008–09 season ====
On 6 July 2008, Tirana president Refik Halili confirmed to have signed Memelli on a one-and-a-half-year loan. About the move to Tirana, Memelli stated: "I spoke with the president Halili for only 15 minutes and everything ended with consensus", while also added that his "goals are the same as those of the club."

He took squad number 9, and made his official debut on 24 August in the opening week of 2008–09 Kategoria Superiore against rivals Vllaznia, playing for 83 minutes before making place for Blerti Hajdari as the match ended in a goalless draw. Memelli opened his scoring account in his second appearance for the club six days later, netting in the 42nd minute of the match versus Teuta to give Tirana the first win of the season. Memelli continued his strong form in September, scoring a tap-in in the 2–0 win at Apolonia which was followed by an impressive hat-trick against Flamurtari at home, taking his tally up to five goals. Speaking of his good run with Tirana, Memelli stated that he aim was to win the Golden Boot and the championship. Later in matchday 7, Memelli scored the opener in an eventual 2–1 home win versus title challengers Dinamo Tirana.

In Albanian Cup, his goal in the second leg helped Tirana past Tërbuni and go to the second round 2–1 on aggregate. Back in the league, Memelli was injured in the match against Lushnja, which forced him to miss the matches against Vllaznia and Teuta. He returned in action in the derby against Partizani, netting a late equalizer to give the team a 2–2 draw. Memelli continued his prolific goalscoring run towards the very end of the year. For the first time in his career, he scored five goals in one game, in a 5–0 rout of Lushnja on 17 December in the second leg of Albanian Cup second round. He had previously scored a brace in the first leg, as Tirana went on the next round 9–1 on aggregate. Ten days later, Memelli scored another hat-trick, this time in the 6–2 home win over Bylis as Tirana ended the year on a high.

Memelli commenced 2009 by scoring a brace in the 4–2 win at Dinamo Tirana to lift his tally to 12 league goals. Later on 15 February, he scored the third goal of the 3–1 away win versus Besa to help Tirana take back the championship lead after 79 days. On 5 April, Memelli scored a brace in the 2–0 home win against Flamurtari; the first goal, scored after only seven seconds into the game, set the record for the fastest ever goal scored in the Kategoria Superiore, beating by three seconds the record set by Gjergji Muzaka in the 2006–07 season. He reached 20-goal landmark in the Kategoria Superiore on 2 May by scoring in a 1–1 draw against Besa. Later on 23 May, in the final match against Vllaznia that would decide the championship, Memelli scored in the first half to pave the road for a 2–1 win, which meant that Tirana won the title four points ahead of Vllaznia.

Memelli concluded the 2008–09 season by helping Tirana to win its 24 championship in history, playing 28 games and scoring an impressive 22 goals in the process, meaning that he has won the Golden Boot for the first time in career, beating his rival Sebino Plaku. In cup, he played eight matches and scored eight goals as Tirana lost the final to Flamurtari Vlorë.

==== 2009–10 season ====
In June, Memelli suffered an injury that kept him sidelined for several months. The player, while still recovering in Belgium, created controversies by accusing the club of not paying the costs of his treatment. Later in August, he was ranked 22nd in the list of top 50 goalscorers by IFFHS. Memelli returned on training in the last days of September, scoring in a 3–0 friendly win over Turbina. Memelli was in the squad for the week 7 match against Dinamo Tirana, despite the player declaring that he was not 100% fit to play. He started the match, but was sent-off after only 14 minutes for a strong challenge on Lucas Malacarne as Tirana lost the match 2–1. The FSHF's Disciplinary Commission suspended Memelli for the next two matches, and also fined him with 3,000 Albanian lek. Memelli returned in action on 30 October in the 1–0 win at Vllaznia. His first cup appearance occurred on 4 November versus Luzi 2008, in a match which he was injured again. This forced him the miss the following league game against Shkumbini.

Memelli's poor season continued, as he returned for the league match against Laçi where he recorded only one shot on target as Tirana lost 1–0. Later on 6 December, following the 2–2 draw against Skënderbeu, he was involved in a verbal confrontation with coach Alban Tafaj; the coach then suspended Memelli for the next two matches. Despite the recent events, club president Refik Halili confirmed that Memelli will continue to be part of the team. Meanwhile, Memelli's suspension was cut short and he returned to the squad and played in the league match against newbie Gramozi, failing to score once again as the match finished in a 1–1 home draw. He scored his first goal of the season on 20 December, netting with a penalty kick in 90th minute in the 4–1 win versus Apolonia Fier.

On 14 January 2010, Memelli left the club without noticing and flew off to Russia to go on trial with Spartak Nalchik. Three days later, with Memelli still on trial with the Russian club, club president Refik Halili stated that Memelli will not allowed to return to Tirana, adding that "there is no place" for Memelli anymore.

=== Flamurtari ===
On 27 January 2010, Memelli completed a transfer to Flamurtari by inking a contract until the end of the 2009–10 season. He made his first appearance for his new club two days later in the match against Shkumbini, missing a crucial penalty in the second half as the team perished 2–1. His first score-sheet contributions came in his second appearance for the club, netting a header in a 3–0 home win over Besa Kavajë. On 12 February, in the league match against Laçi, Memelli had scored in the first half; during the half time break, the striker reportedly was threatened with a gun by Laçi president Pashk Laska. Laska allegedly insulted Memelli and told him not to score in the second half. Laçi reportedly denied all the claims. The match, played at Laçi Stadium, was lost 3–2 with all goals scored in the first half. Flamurtari Vlorë released a statement after the match accusing the Laçi's directors for verbal and physical violence, citing:

The Flamurtari Club denounces the serious event that occurred in our team's dressing room in the match break. Laçi representatives have entered there by practicing verbal and physical violence against Flamurtari players, especially against the striker Memelli. The situation has been quite tense throughout the 15 minutes. Under these conditions, the mayor of Vlora, Mr. Gjika was contacted by telephone, and after his decision the team go on formally in the second half of the match.

Despite this, Memelli continued his scoring form, netting eight goals in the next eight matches, including braces against Besa Kavajë and Kastrioti Krujë. Overall, Memelli recorded an impressive 14 goals in just 15 games, as Flamurtari concluded the season by finishing 5th in championship.

=== Saudi Arabia ===
Memelli attracted hug interest from both Albania and abroad following a very impressive second half of the 2009–10 season with Flamurtari Vlorë. However, he opted to join former Dinamo Tirana coach Zlatko Dalić in Saudi Arabia and completed the transfer at Al-Faisaly Harmah on 17 June 2010. He signed a one-year contract with the club worth over $320,000. The deal also included bonuses for every win and for every goal whilst at the club, and also a luxury apartment in the city of Harmah as well as a brand new car.

Memelli made his debut in the Saudi Professional League in the opening matchday of 2010–11 season, netting a late goal which gave his side the tempolarly lead in an eventual 3–3 away draw against Al Wahda. His next goals came later on 3 October in form of a brace in the 4–2 home win over Najran.

=== Return to Flamurtari Vlorë ===
On 31 July 2012, Memelli returned to Albania by completing a transfer to Flamurtari Vlorë, returning after two years.

=== Partizani Tirana ===
On 20 January 2014, having been a free agent since leaving Al-Faisaly, Memelli returned to Albanian Superliga and completed a transfer to fellow capital club Partizani Tirana. He signed a six-month contract worth 3.5 million lek and took squad number 9 for the second part of 2013–14 season. The player reportedly turned down the offer of his former side Tirana, and during his presentation, Memelli showed his ambitious side by stating that he came to the club to win the championship.

Memelli made his official debut on 15 February in the league encounter versus Lushnja, netting a brace inside 12 minutes to give his team a 2–0 win at Qemal Stafa Stadium. He was on the score-sheet again one month later, netting an opener in 5th minute of a 2–0 win over Bylis Ballsh. The striker continued his fine form later on throughout the season, netting matchwinners against Besa Kavajë and Kukësi (a first half free kick), in addition another goal during the 3–1 win against Teuta Durrës, bringing his tally up to six goals in nine matches.

On 4 May, Memelli missed a crucial penalty in the week 33 match against Skënderbeu Korçë, a miss that costed Partizani the match as the "Red Bulls" were defeated 2–1 at home. After the end of the match, the club blamed Memelli for the loss which costed the team a place in UEFA Europa League for the next season. Shortly after, Partizani released Memelli, thus concluding his short spell with 11 appearances and 6 goals.

=== Laçi ===
On 24 August 2014, Memelli, aged 34, signed a one-year contract with fellow Albanian Superliga side Laçi, returning in Laç after ten years. He did not participate in the team's opening match of 2014–15 season against Partizani Tirana, but returned in the team for the next match against the champions of Skënderbeu Korçë, playing the last 19 minutes of the 2–0 away defeat.

Memelli played for the first time as a starter in his only second appearance during the goalless home draw against Kukësi on 10 September. He opened his scoring account against Teuta Durres on 23 November, netting a header in the 23rd minute after a cross from Taulant Sefgjinaj in an eventual 3–0 home win. However, his second spell with Laçi was short-lived, as he managed to play only in 11 matches, which six of them as starter, scoring once in the process. He left the club in the first days of the new year 2015.

=== Supposedly transfer to Tërbuni Pukë ===
On 28 January 2015, Memelli was set up for a move to Albanian First Division side Tërbuni Pukë, who confirmed that the player is part of the team. The player also made a training session with the team, but two days later, Memelli himself turned down the club's claim by saying that he has not signed a contract with them, leaving the club in the process.

== International career ==
Memelli was first approached to the Albania senior team by manager Otto Barić for gathering in Tirana in December 2006. In January of the following year, under Otto Barić, Memelli was called up to the Albania B side, making his debut in a friendly against Antalyaspor, scoring in the 49th minute as the match was won 6–2. He played again as starter in the second friendly, this time against Germany's Fortuna Düsseldorf, which ended in a goalless draw. Memelli then started from the bench the third and final friendly against Tirana; the match ended in a 2–2 draw.

Memelli continued to be part of the B squad, receiving another invitation by new coach Arie Haan for gathering in Antalya in January 2008. He scored a brace in 38th and 39th minute in the 2–2 draw against Kazaskyn.

Following a very impressive 2008–09 season, Memelli returned to the senior national team after receiving a call-up by coach Arie Haan. On 1 April 2009, made his competitive debut in a FIFA World Cup qualification match against Denmark, entering in the finals minutes in place of Besart Berisha. His debut was not one to celebrate as Albania lost the match 3–0 and by doing so further reducing their chances of qualification and the manager that called him up then stood down from his role as the coach of Albania.

== Career statistics ==
=== Club ===
Appearances and goals by club, season and competition
Club	Season	League			Cup		Continental		Total	
Club	Season	Division	Apps	Goals	Apps	Goals	Apps	Goals	Apps	Goals
Skënderbeu Korçë	2000–01	Albanian First Division	26	7	0	0	—		26	7
Teuta Durrës	2001–02	Albanian Superliga	19	4	0	0	—		19	4
Teuta Durrës	2002–03	Albanian Superliga	21	8	0	0	—		21	8
Teuta Durrës	Total		40	12	0	0	—		40	12
Elbasani	2003–04	Albanian Superliga	29	12	0	0	—		29	12
Laçi	2004–05	Albanian First Division	4	1	0	0	—		4	1
Elbasani	2004–05	Albanian Superliga	17	4	0	0	—		17	4
Elbasani	2005–06	Albanian Superliga	—		—		1 (Note: All appearance(s) in UEFA Cup)	0	1	0
Elbasani	Total		17	4	0	0	1	0	18	4
Skënderbeu Korçë	2005–06	Albanian First Division	12	8	0	0	—		12	8
Brann	2006	Tippeligaen	19	1	3	4	3	4	25	9
GAIS	2007	Allsvenskan	16	0	0	0	—		16	0
GAIS	2008	Allsvenskan	1	0	0	0	—		1	0
GAIS	Total		17	0	0	0	—		17	0
Tirana (loan)	2008–09	Albanian Superliga	29	22	8	8	—		37	30
Tirana (loan)	2009–10	Albanian Superliga	9	1	2	1	0	0	11	2
Tirana (loan)	Total		38	23	10	9	0	0	48	32
Flamurtari Vlorë	2009–10	Albanian Superliga	15	14	0	0	—		15	14
Al-Faisaly	2010–11	Saudi Professional League	23	14	0	0	—		23	14
Al-Taawoun	2011–12	Saudi Professional League	20	4	0	0	—		20	4
Flamurtari Vlorë	2012–13	Albanian Superliga	22	19	9	7	2 (Note: All appearance(s) in UEFA Europa League)	0	33	26
Al-Faisaly	2013–14	Saudi Professional League	13	1	1	1	—		14	2
Partizani Tirana	2013–14	Albanian Superliga	11	6	0	0	—		11	6
Laçi	2014–15	Albanian Superliga	11	1	2	0	—		13	1
Kastrioti Krujë	2015–16	Albanian First Division	0	0	1	0	—		1	0
Career total			317	127	26	21	6	4	349	152

=== International ===
Appearances and goals by national team and year
National team	Year	Apps	Goals
Albania	2009	1	0
Total		1	0

== Honours ==
Tirana

- Kategoria Superiore: 2008–09
- Albanian Supercup: 2009

Individual

- Albanian Superliga top scorer: 2008–09, 2012–13
- Albanian Cup top scorer: 2008–09
