= Hendrit Ferra =

Albanian football player

Personal information
- Full name: Hendrit Ferra
- Date of birth: 13 January 1989 (age 37)
- Place of birth: Tiranë, Albania
- Position: Striker

Youth career
- 2005–2008: Tirana

Senior career*
Years	Team	Apps	(Gls)
2008–2010	Tirana	2	(0)
2009–2010	→ Teuta (loan)	5	(0)
2010	→ Elbasani (loan)	5	(0)
2011–2012	Laçi	1	(0)
2012–2013	Dinamo Tirana	10	(4)
- * Club domestic league appearances and goals as of 25 June 2015

Hendrit Ferra (born c. 1990) is an Albanian football player who played for Dinamo Tirana.

== Club career ==
=== KF Tirana ===
Ferra made his league debut for KF Tirana on 21 March 2009 during the match with Apolonia Fier. The 20-year-old striker came on for goalscorer Devis Mukaj on the 84th minute of the game.

=== Teuta Durrës ===
Ferra was loaned out to fellow Albanian Superliga side in order to get more first team action and to gain experience.
