= Laurent Mohellebi =

French footballer (born 1984)

Personal information
- Date of birth: 5 January 1984 (age 42)
- Place of birth: Marseille, France
- Height: 1.80 m (5 ft 11 in)
- Position: Midfielder

Team information
- Current team: Atlético Baleares

Youth career
- 1999–2004: AS Monaco FC

Senior career*
Years	Team	Apps	(Gls)
2004–2006	FC Istres	24	(0)
2007	Paris SG	2	(0)
2008–2009	KF Tirana	14	(1)
2010–2011	Issy AS Ararat		
2011–2012	Atlético Baleares		
- * Club domestic league appearances and goals

Laurent Mohellebi (born 5 January 1984) is a French footballer. He played for Atlético Baleares.

== Career ==
Born in Marseille, Mohellebi has played for Paris Saint-Germain F.C., AS Monaco FC, FC Istres and the Albanian champions SK Tirana in the Albanian Superliga.

== International career ==
He was part of the France national U-17 team that won the FIFA U-17 World Cup in 2001.
