= Erald Turdiu =

Albanian footballer

Personal information
- Full name: Erald Turdiu
- Date of birth: July 15, 1984 (age 42)
- Place of birth: Tirana, Albania
- Height: 1.88 m (6 ft 2 in)
- Position: Midfielder

Youth career
- Tirana

Senior career*
Years	Team	Apps	(Gls)
2003–2006	Kastrioti	60	(3)
2006–2007	Tirana	5	(0)
2007–2008	Kastrioti	24	(3)
2008–2009	Shkumbini	27	(2)
2009–2014	Kastrioti	102	(11)
2014–2016	Dinamo Tirana	61	(15)
- * Club domestic league appearances and goals as of 12 October 2015

Erald 'Tushe' Turdiu (born July 15, 1984, in Tirana) is an Albanian retired footballer who finished his career with Dinamo Tirana in the Albanian First Division as a midfielder. He has played for KF Tirana and Shkumbini Peqin.

== Career ==
=== Dinamo Tirana ===
On 2 September 2014, Turdiu joined Albanian First Division side Dinamo Tirana on a one-year contract, signing along with Erjon Xhafa. He made his competitive debut later that month, on 27 September, in the 0–2 away win over Luftëtari Gjirokastër, scoring the opener in the 12th minute. Turdiu enjoyed a prolific form in October, scoring three times, including the winner against Lushnja, taking his tally up to 4 goals. On 23 November, during the league match against Bylis Ballsh, Turdiu was sent-off in the 80th minute after headbutting Orgest Buzi. Three days later, Turdiu gave his version, saying he did not headbutt Buzi, adding that he [Buzi] had pushing and played aggressively against him [Turdiu] the whole match. He missed the next match against Butrinti Sarandë, and returned in action on 6 December in the 3–1 away defeat to Pogradeci.

== Personal life ==
Turdiu was assaulted by police in 2008 whilst he was a Shkumbini Peqin player, following a brawl to which he was witness. It is claimed that Turdiu had insulted the on-duty police officer and they reacted violently, beating Turdiu in the centre of the capital, Tirana.

In December 2010, Turdiu brutally assaulted Albanian Superliga referee Laver Alla, outside a bar near Tirana International Airport. He faced a lifetime ban by the FSHF as the player had a string of offences and bans, including an 8 match ban following a mass brawl during the Albanian Superliga 2010 Playoff finals. He received a 4-year ban by the FSHF but following an appeal by the player and his club Kastrioti Krujë, the ban was lifted after just 8 months meaning Turdiu was eligible to play at the start of the 2011–12 campaign.

== Honours ==
KF Tirana

- Albanian Superliga (1): 2006–07

Kastrioti Krujë

- Albanian Superliga Playoffs (1): 2010
