= Toni Pezo =

Croatian football midfielder (born 1987)

Personal information
- Full name: Toni Pezo
- Date of birth: 14 February 1987 (age 39)
- Place of birth: Split, SR Croatia, SFR Yugoslavia
- Height: 1.85 m (6 ft 1 in)
- Position: Defensive midfielder

Youth career
- 2000–2005: Hajduk Split

Senior career*
Years	Team	Apps	(Gls)
2005–2011	Hajduk Split	4	(0)
2007–2008	→ Zrinjski Mostar (loan)	29	(0)
2008–2009	→ Tirana (loan)	28	(0)
2010–2011	→ Zadar (loan)	24	(1)
2011	Zadar	9	(0)
2012–2013	Flamurtari	29	(0)
2013–2014	Zrinjski Mostar	6	(0)
2014–2015	Vitez	29	(1)
2016	Metalleghe-BSI	10	(2)
2017	Lučko	9	(0)
2017–2020	Zagora Unešić		
2020–2022	Kaštel Gomilica		

International career
2003	Croatia U16	3	(0)
2003	Croatia U17	1	(0)
- * Club domestic league appearances and goals as of 21 December 2017

Toni Pezo (born 14 February 1987 in Split, Croatia) is a Croatian retired football midfielder who last played for Kaštel Gomilica.

== Career ==
Toni Pezo started off his career in Croatia with Hajduk Split. After spending the 2005–2006 season at the club without any success, he realised he had no real chance of breaking into the first team any time soon so he decided to move in search of more first team football. This move came in the summer transfer window of 2006, he decided to play abroad in Bosnia and Herzegovina with Zrinjski Mostar. After two seasons in Bosnia-Herzegovina, Pezo moved to Albania after attracting interest from SK Tirana. He has found it difficult since moving to Albania but has still impressed during the time that he has been there. He has since resigned with Hajduk Split. He is currently playing for NK Metalleghe BSI, Bosnia and Herzegovina, Premier Ligue.

=== Flamurtari Vlorë ===
Pezo signed for Flamurtari Vlorë on 10 January 2012, along with fellow Croatian Pero Pejić.
