= Refik Halili =

Albanian football executive

Refik Halili is the chairman and main sponsor of KF Tirana. Since 2003, Halili had been one of the sponsors of the club. His duty as Chairman of KF Tirana started on May 29, 2008. He is a businessman and founder and owner of one of Albania's leading industrial companies Halili Sh.p.k.

== 2008–2009 ==
At that time (end of 2007–2008 season) KF Tirana had ended the Albanian Superliga in 6th place. When Halili started his new job as Tirana's Chairman, his first step in his job was to hire Bosnian coach Blaž Slišković for the 2008–2009 season. The new coach gave his resignations and was substituted by coach Agustin Kola and eventually by coach Alban Tafaj. As a result KF Tirana was led by three different managers in the 2008–2009 season, however the club won the Albanian Superliga, 4 points ahead of second placed Vllaznia.

== 2009–2010 ==
At the beginning of the 2009–2010 season, Halili was confirmed as KF Tirana's president. Right after that he hired Croatian coach, Ilija Loncarevic. The Croat was sacked after barely four weeks into the season and replaced by Devi Muka.

== 2010 FSHF run ==
Refik Halili was one of the two contenders to the FSHF president seat challenging Armand Duka in the 2010 elections. He came second and Duka started his third term to the presidency of the FSHF.
