= Pece Korunovski =

Macedonian footballer

Personal information
- Full name: Pece Korunovski; Пеце Коруновски
- Date of birth: 5 October 1982 (age 44)
- Place of birth: Bitola, SFR Yugoslavia
- Height: 1.84 m (6 ft 0 in)
- Position: Goalkeeper

Senior career*
Years	Team	Apps	(Gls)
2004–2006	Belasica	10	(0)
2006–2007	Pelister	11	(0)
2007–2008	Vardar	8	(0)
2009	Napredok	21	(0)
2009–2010	KF Tirana	12	(0)
2010–2012	11 Oktomvri	24	(0)
2012–2013	Pelister	27	(0)
2013	Napredok		
2014–2016	Mladost Carev Dvor		
- * Club domestic league appearances and goals as of 19 May 2010

Pece Korunovski (Macedonian: Пеце Коруновски; born 5 October 1982) is a Macedonian retired football goalkeeper, who last played for FK Mladost Carev Dvor in Second Macedonian Football League.
