= Safet Osja =

Albanian footballer

Personal information
- Date of birth: 17 October 1975 (age 51)
- Place of birth: Shkodër, Albania
- Height: 1.73 m (5 ft 8 in)
- Position: Midfielder

Senior career*
Years	Team	Apps	(Gls)
1995–1997	Laçi	41	(0)
1997–2004	Vllaznia	164	(3)
2004–2006	Elbasani	70	(1)
2006–2010	Vllaznia	112	(4)
2010–2012	Ada	10	(5)
Total		397	(13)

International career
	Albania U-21	1	(0)
- * Club domestic league appearances and goals

Safet Osja (born 17 October 1975) is an Albanian retired footballer who last played as a midfielder for KS Ada Velipojë in the Albanian First Division.

Osja was previously with KS Vllaznia Shkodër and he played for them in the 2009–10 UEFA Europa League.
