= Blendi Nallbani =

Albanian footballer

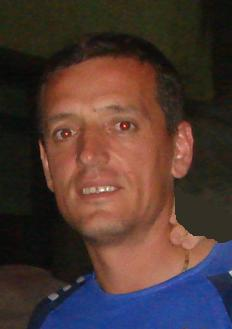

Personal information
- Date of birth: 30 May 1971 (age 55)
- Place of birth: Tirana, PR Albania
- Height: 1.87 m (6 ft 2 in)
- Position: Goalkeeper

Senior career*
Years	Team	Apps	(Gls)
1986–1990	Partizani	39	(0)
1990–1991	17 Nëntori Tirana	24	(0)
1991	Gloria Bistrița		
1992–1993	Tirana	24	(0)
1993–1994	Partizani	4	(0)
1994–2001	Tirana	163	(0)
2001–2004	Partizani	83	(0)
2004–2011	Tirana	116	(1)
Total		453	(1)

International career^{‡}
1987	Albania U18	1	(0)
1990	Albania U21	3	(0)
1989–2002	Albania	18	(0)
- * Club domestic league appearances and goals as of 30 May 2011 ‡ National team caps and goals as of 20 May 2002

Blendi Nallbani (born 30 May 1971) is a retired Albanian professional footballer who played as a goalkeeper. Nallbani was a member of the Albania national team prior to his international retirement in 2002.

Nicknamed Tata, he was the second youngest player to play for the national team only aged 17 at Wembley. He also holds many records, such as joint most Albanian Superliga winner and the player with the most matches in Albanian Superliga.

== Club career ==
After the fall of communism, he was able to move abroad to play in Romania, but then moved back to Albania for good. He initially played for Partizani Tirana and then, as soon as moving between clubs was allowed in Albania, he moved to his current team KF Tirana for a transfer fee of USD1,000,000 where has won multiple championships, cups, and supercups. That was the most expensive transfer in the Albanian football history at that time and made front-page news of all major newspapers. In 2001 he returned to Partizani.

=== Tirana ===
Nallbani moved back to Tirana for a fourth stint in the summer of 2004 after four seasons at rival club Partizani Tirana. He joined goalkeepers Isli Hidi and Nigerian Ndubuisi Egbo at the club.

== International career ==
=== International debut ===
At only seventeen years old, Nallbani was the second youngest ever player to play for the Albania national team. He conceded five goals to a strong English side in his premiere at Wembley Stadium. However, had it not been for his strong performance, Albania would have suffered an even greater defeat. After the game, the English media praised Nallbani's performance as one of the greatest performances and Peter Shilton was himself amazed by the performance of the young Albanian.

"He (Shilton) was 21 when he first pulled on an England jersey and that helped to produce a fascinating statistic when England met Albania in a World Cup qualifier at Wembley in 1989. Blendi Nallbani, the goalkeeper at the other end, was only 17 and hadn't been born when Shilts made his debut."

At 17 years old, Nallbani was also the youngest goalkeeper to play in an England match.

After that famous English game and another one against Spain, Nallbani received offers from other famed European Clubs (Barcelona, Juventus, Anderlecht, and some Romanian and Turkish clubs). However, due to the "communist Albania," he was not allowed to play for teams outside the country or his family would be persecuted and possibly jailed.

In the year, 1990, he was selected in the Under-21 Best European Selection and was supposed to play a charity game against the Africa/Asia Under-21. However, he was not able to attend this game for the same reasons that he was not allowed to play for a European Club at that time.

Nallbani earned a total of 18 caps, scoring no goals. His final international was an April 2002 friendly match against Andorra.

== Relations with the media ==
Nallbani is known in Albania as being a bubbly and extravagant person who likes to make jokes with the Albanian media. During the 2008–2009 season in a heated derby match against his former team, Partizani Tirana Nallbani was booked for handling the ball outside of his area, which angered the Partizani players and fans as they thought that the keeper deserved a sending off for the offence. After the match ended, Nallbani tried to explain in the changing rooms that he did not handle the ball outside his area saying

"I swear on my daughter, I didn't touch the ball with my hand."

Nallbani is the father of two children, both of them boys. The referee Elvis Peza had also not booked Nallbani for a foul in the 55th minute on Partizani's Brazilian striker Paulo Marcel Pereira Merabet. This prompted an investigation from the FSHF (Albanian FA) into Peza's performance during the match which received a lot of media coverage in Albania as Nallbani was involved in two key decisions during the match. Former player and now head of Refereeing in Albania Ilir Shulku quickly jumped to Peza's defence and put him off the hook.

== Personal life ==
Nallbani is married and has two children, both of which are boys, Marvin and Dejvi. One of his children has followed in his father's footsteps as a footballer. His son born in 1992, Marvin Nallbani, is also a footballer and played for some time at KF Tirana with his father. Unlike his father he plays outfield, mostly in midfield and has been training with the Tirana senior squad since the age of 8.

As of 2018, he is head of the omnisports club Studenti.

== Career statistics ==
=== Club ===
Club statistics
Club	Season	League			Cup		Europe		Other		Total	
Club	Season	Division	Apps	Goals	Apps	Goals	Apps	Goals	Apps	Goals	Apps	Goals
Partizani Tirana	1987–88	Albanian Superliga	18	0	0	0	—		—		18	0
Partizani Tirana	1988–89	Albanian Superliga	15	0	0	0	—		—		15	0
Partizani Tirana	1989–90	Albanian Superliga	5	0	0	0	—		—		5	0
Partizani Tirana	1990–91	Albanian Superliga	1	0	0	0	—		—		1	0
Partizani Tirana	Total		39	0	0	0	—		—		39	0
Tirana	1990–91	Albanian Superliga	24	0	0	0	—		—		24	0
Gloria Bistriţa	1991–92	Liga I	0	0	0	0	—		—		0	0
Tirana	1991–92	Albanian Superliga	8	0	0	0	—		—		8	0
Tirana	1992–93	Albanian Superliga	16	0	0	0	—		—		26	0
Tirana	Total		24	0	0	0	—		—		24	0
Partizani Tirana	1993–94	Albanian Superliga	4	0	0	0	—		—		4	0
Tirana	1994–95	Albanian Superliga	14	0	0	0	—		—		14	0
Tirana	1995–96	Albanian Superliga	31	0	0	0	—		—		31	0
Tirana	1996–97	Albanian Superliga	18	0	0	0	—		—		18	0
Tirana	1998–99	Albanian Superliga	23	0	0	0	—		—		23	0
Tirana	1999–2000	Albanian Superliga	25	0	0	0	—		—		25	0
Tirana	2000–01	Albanian Superliga	26	0	1	0	—		—		27	0
Tirana	2001–02	Albanian Superliga	26	0	0	0	—		0	0	26	0
Tirana	Total		163	0	1	0	0	0	0	0	164	0
Partizani Tirana	2001–02	Albanian Superliga	25	0	0	0	—		—		25	0
Partizani Tirana	2002–03	Albanian Superliga	24	0	0	0	2 (Note: All appearance(s) in UEFA Cup)	0	—		26	0
Partizani Tirana	2003–04	Albanian Superliga	34	0	5	0	—		—		39	0
Partizani Tirana	2004–05	Albanian Superliga	0	0	0	0	2	0	0	0	2	0
Partizani Tirana	Total		83	0	5	0	4	0	0	0	92	0
Tirana	2004–05	Albanian Superliga	8	0	0	0	—		—		8	0
Tirana	2005–06	Albanian Superliga	16	0	0	0	4 (Note: All appearance(s) in UEFA Champions League)	0	0	0	20	0
Tirana	2006–07	Albanian Superliga	11	0	0	0	4	0	1 (Note: Appearance in Albanian Supercup)	0	16	0
Tirana	2007–08	Albanian Superliga	21	0	0	0	—		0	0	21	0
Tirana	2008–09	Albanian Superliga	29	0	7	0	—		—		36	0
Tirana	2009–10	Albanian Superliga	28	1	3	0	2	0	1	0	34	1
Tirana	2010–11	Albanian Superliga	3	0	0	0	2 (Note: All appearance(s) in UEFA Europa League)	0	—		5	0
Tirana	Total		116	1	10	0	12	0	2	0	138	1
Career total			453	1	16	0	16	0	2	0	487	1

=== International ===
Appearances and goals by national team and year
National team	Year	Apps	Goals
Albania	1989	2	0
Albania	1991	3	0
Albania	1993	1	0
Albania	1995	3	0
Albania	1996	4	0
Albania	1997	1	0
Albania	2002	4	0
Total		18	0

== Honours ==
- Albanian Superliga: 5

1995, 1996, 1997, 1999, 2000
