= Abraham Alechenwu =

Nigerian footballer

Personal information
- Date of birth: 26 March 1986 (age 40)
- Place of birth: Lagos, Nigeria
- Height: 1.80 m (5 ft 11 in)
- Position: Left-back

Youth career
- –2003: Ambassadors of Christ

Senior career*
Years	Team	Apps	(Gls)
2004	Gramozi Ersekë		
2005	Apolonia Fier		
2005–2006	Elbasani		
2007	Tirana	29	(0)
2007–2008	Dinamo Tirana	31	(0)
2008–2010	Tirana	57	(0)
2010	Iraklis	0	(0)
2011	Vllaznia Shkodër	14	(0)
2012	Flamurtari Vlorë	21	(0)
2012	Vardar	0	(0)
2012–2013	Besa Kavajë	20	(0)
2013–2014	Kastrioti Krujë	22	(1)
2014–2015	Adriatiku Mamurrasi	21	(1)
2015–2016	Kamza	17	(0)
2016–2017	Laçi	22	(0)
- * Club domestic league appearances and goals

Abraham Alechenwu (Albanian: Abraham Aleçenu; born 26 March 1986) is a Nigerian former football player and a football agent.

He spent the majority of his career in Albania where he notably had a successful spell with Elbasani and Tirana and was once dubbed as the best left-back in the Albanian Superliga.

== Career ==
=== Early career ===
Abraham started his playing career in Nigeria Division 1 with Ambassadors of Christ as a teenager. He then moved to Albania in 2004 in search of European football. Abraham had three unsuccessful trials at Besa Kavaje, Teuta Durrës and Elbasani, which then forced him to move to Gramozi Ersekë. After playing well for KS Gramozi Erseke the young Nigerian transferred to Apolonia Fier who were playing in Albanian First Division at the time.

=== Albanian Superliga ===
Following a very successful first year in Albanian and European football, Abraham made his move to the Albanian Superliga. His first team in Albania's premiere division was KF Elbasani, he joined them in the summer of 2005. During his first season in the Superliga he was part of a very successful KF Elbasani side that won the league. Abraham was part of the best defence in Albania in that season conceding only 22 goals all season.

He was also part of the Dinamo Tirana team that won the 2007–08 Albanian Superliga. KF Tirana signed the Nigerian defender in the summer transfer window of 2008 for a fee believed to be in the region of around $160,000. He has also set a new record in Albania, having won 4 Albanian Superliga titles, the most ever for a foreign player in Albanian football.

=== AC Milan friendly ===
Abraham played a big role in KF Tirana's 2–1 victory over Italian giants, AC Milan in the first ever Taçi Oil Cup organised by Albanian oil baron Rezart Taçi. He had a very impressive game at left back, especially going forward. However, despite having a great game he lost the ball just before the end of the game which then lead to Ronaldinho's late goal.

"I felt bad that they were able to score through my mistake. All the same, it was good that we beat Milan, although it was only a friendly match. The bigger joy for me was that I eventually exchanged jerseys with Clarence Seedorf and I was able to get a DVD copy of the match "

=== Iraklis ===
In July 2010 Abraham signed for Iraklis in the Super League Greece.

=== Vardar Skopje ===
In June 2012, Abraham signed a one-and-a-half contract with Vardar in the Macedonian First Football League. He played with the team in their away match against BATE Borisov in the 2012–13 UEFA Champions League qualifiers however, he was released before the start of domestic season in Macedonia, and, with the transfer window still open, Abraham ended up returning to Albania where he joined Besa Kavajë.

=== Adriatiku Mamurrasi ===
Following Kastrioti Krujë's relegation from the Albanian Superliga, Alechenwu left the club in search of a new team, and he ended up joining Adriatiku Mamurrasi in the Albanian First Division who had serious ambitions regarding achieving promotion to the top flight for the first time in its history.

=== Laçi ===
In August 2016, Abraham returned to top flight and signed a one-year contract with Laçi.

== Personal life ==
Abraham has an Albanian passport and can speak Albanian fluently.

== Honours ==
Elbasani

- Albanian Superliga: 2005–06

Dinamo Tirana

- Albanian Superliga: 2007–08

Tirana

- Albanian Superliga: 2006–07, 2008–09
- Albanian Supercup: 2006, 2009
