= Jetmir Sefa =

Albanian footballer

Personal information
- Full name: Jetmir Sefa
- Date of birth: 30 January 1987 (age 39)
- Place of birth: Tirana, Albania
- Height: 1.78 m (5 ft 10 in)
- Position: Midfielder

Youth career
- 2000–2005: Tirana

Senior career*
Years	Team	Apps	(Gls)
2005–2010	Tirana	106	(9)
2010–2011	Skënderbeu	17	(1)
2011–2012	Kastrioti	22	(4)
2012–2013	Bylis Ballsh	22	(2)
2013–2014	Kastrioti	25	(3)
2014	Laçi	13	(0)
2015	Tirana	15	(1)
2015–2016	Vllaznia	30	(2)
2016–2017	Kamza	15	(1)
2017–2018	Liria Prizren	26	(1)
2018–2020	Dinamo Tirana	36	(6)
2020–2021	Besa Kavajë	10	(0)

International career
2003–2005	Albania U17	2	(0)
2005–2007	Albania U19	3	(0)
2007–2009	Albania U21	8	(1)
2009	Albania	2	(0)
- * Club domestic league appearances and goals as of 20:57, 21 September 2021 (UTC)

Jetmir Sefa (born 30 January 1987) is an Albanian professional footballer who plays as a midfielder.

== Club career ==
=== Tirana ===
==== 2005–06 season ====
Sefa is a product of the KF Tirana academy and joined the club in 2000 as a 13-year-old, where he rose through the ranks before eventually reaching the first team in 2005. He was promoted to the first team ahead of the 2005–06 campaign by Leonardo Menichini, who was the head coach at the club at the time, and he joined a competitive midfield which included Ervin Bulku, Sajmir Patushi, Devi Muka, Klodian Duro and Cristiano Muzzachi.

He made his league debut on 7 September 2005 in an away game against Shkumbini Peqin as an 18-year-old, where he started the game in a midfield made up of Devi Muka, Ervin Bulku and Engert Bakalli. His debut ended in 1–1 draw, in a game which saw Sefa being one of 4 players to be cautioned and his teammate Arjan Pisha receiving a straight red card. He made 14 league appearances throughout the 2005–06 Albanian Superliga, starting 8 of them and competing the full 90 minutes on 4 occasions. KF Tirana finished runners-up in the league to KF Elbasani, who won their first Albanian Superliga title since 1984. He was also part of the 2005–06 Albanian Cup winning squad, which was his first ever professional title.

==== 2006–07 season ====
He began the following season in a UEFA Cup qualifier against Croatian NK Varteks, where he travelled with the squad to Varaždin only to make a cameo appearance on his European debut, as he came on as a 90th-minute substitute for Vioresin Sinani in the 1–1 draw. He did not feature in the return leg, which saw his side progress to the next round following a 2–0 victory. He did not feature in the first leg of KF Tirana's next UEFA Cup fixture against Kayserispor, but he did play in the second leg as KF Tirana were knocked out of the competition by the Turkish side. He featured in 21 league games during the 2006–07 Albanian Superliga campaign as KF Tirana won the league after finishing runners-up the season before.

==== 2007–08 season ====
Following the departure of Ervin Bulku to FC Kryvbas Kryvyi Rih in the summer of 2007, Sefa was given the number 8 shirt, which was seen as a great privilege by the club to give the young midfielder the number of a departing legend. He scored his first league goal for the club on 1 September 2007 in a home match against Shkumbini Peqin, in a season where he featured in 13 league games and scored 3 goals in the process as his side finished in a disappointing 6th place, and Albanian cup runners-up.

=== Laçi ===
On 6 June 2014, Sefa completed a transfer to Laçi as a free agent by penning a contract until the end of 2014–15 season. However, he left the team on 5 January of the following by terminating his contract with the club.

=== Return to KF Tirana ===
He rejoined Tirana in January 2015 after agreeing terms with his previous club Laçi in order to complete the transfer, for a reported nominal fee of 300,000 Albanian lek (around €2,150). He made his return debut for the club on 24 January against Apolonia Fier, coming on as a 62nd-minute substitute for Mario Morina in the 2–0 win.

=== Vllaznia Shkodër ===
On 1 September 2015, in the last day of summer transferts window, Sefa left Tirana and signed with Vllaznia Shkodër for an undisclosed fee, taking the vacant number 24 for the 2015–16 season.

On 3 October 2015, Sefa scored his first goal for the club, a last-minute equaliser from a free kick against Kukësi, giving the team the first point of the season after five consecutive loses.

=== Kamza ===
On 2 August 2016, Sefa agreed personal terms and joined Albanian First Division side Kamza as a free agent, signing a one-year contract. He was presented on the same day along with Valdan Nimani and Elton Basriu, and was handed squad number 8.

=== Liria Prizren ===
On 5 July 2017, Sefa signed a contract with Liria Prizren of Football Superleague of Kosovo, rejoining his former teammate Bledi Shkëmbi now as coach.

== International career ==
=== Senior team ===
He received his first call up for the Albania national team by Josip Kuže for a friendly against Cyprus on 12 August 2009, which ended in a record breaking 6–1 win for Albania as Sefa had a debut to remember.

== Style of play ==
Sefa mainly operates as a central midfielder but he can also play in a more advances role, as well as having played on both the left and right sides of the midfield.

== Career statistics ==
As of 18 June 2015

Club	Season	League			Albanian Cup		Supercup		Europe		Total	
Club	Season	Division	Apps	Goals	Apps	Goals	Apps	Goals	Apps	Goals	Apps	Goals
KF Tirana	2005–06	Albanian Superliga	14	0	?	?	0	0	—	—	14	0
KF Tirana	2006–07	Albanian Superliga	21	0	?	?	0	0	2	0	23	0
KF Tirana	2007–08	Albanian Superliga	13	3	?	?	1	0	2	0	16	3
KF Tirana	2008–09	Albanian Superliga	27	3	7	1	—	—	—	—	34	4
KF Tirana	2009–10	Albanian Superliga	31	3	3	0	1	0	2	0	39	3
KF Tirana	Total		106	9	10	1	2	0	6	0	124	10
Skënderbeu Korçë	2010–11	Albanian Superliga	17	1	3	0	—	—	—	—	20	1
Skënderbeu Korçë	Total		17	1	3	0	—	—	—	—	20	1
Kastrioti Krujë	2011–12	Albanian Superliga	22	4	10	2	—	—	—	—	32	6
Kastrioti Krujë	Total		22	4	10	2	—	—	—	—	32	6
Bylis Ballsh	2012–13	Albanian Superliga	22	2	8	1	—	—	—	—	30	3
Bylis Ballsh	Total		22	2	8	1	—	—	—	—	30	3
Skënderbeu Korçë	2013–14	Albanian Superliga	—	—	—	—	—	—	3	0	3	0
Skënderbeu Korçë	Total		—	—	—	—	—	—	3	0	3	0
Kastrioti Krujë	2013–14	Albanian Superliga	25	2	1	0	—	—	—	—	26	2
Kastrioti Krujë	Total		25	2	1	0	—	—	—	—	26	2
KF Laçi	2014–15	Albanian Superliga	13	0	4	2	—	—	4	0	21	2
KF Laçi	Total		13	0	4	2	—	—	4	0	21	2
KF Tirana	2014–15	Albanian Superliga	14	1	3	0	—	—	—	—	17	1
KF Tirana	2015–16	Albanian Superliga	1	0	0	0	—	—	—	—	1	0
KF Tirana	Total		15	1	3	0	—	—	—	—	18	1
Career total			220	19	39	6	2	0	13	0	274	25

== Honours ==
=== Club ===
Tirana

- Albanian Superliga: 2006–07, 2008–09
- Albanian Cup: 2005–06
- Albanian Supercup: 2007, 2009

Skënderbeu Korçë

- Albanian Superliga: 2010–11
