= Halim Begaj =

Albanian footballer

Personal information
- Full name: Halim Begaj
- Date of birth: 29 November 1985 (age 40)
- Place of birth: Vlorë, Albania
- Position: Defender

Youth career
- 2000–2004: Flamurtari

Senior career*
Years	Team	Apps	(Gls)
2004–2012	Flamurtari	140	(5)
2012	→ Pogradeci (loan)	8	(0)
2012–2013	Vllaznia	16	(0)
2013–2014	Flamurtari	26	(1)
2015	Sopoti	10	(0)
2015–2016	Korabi	21	(4)
2020	Labëria	12	(6)
- * Club domestic league appearances and goals

Halim Begaj (born 29 November 1985) is an Albanian footballer who most recently played as a defender for Labëria FC in the Kategoria e Dytë.

== Honours ==
Flamurtari

- Albanian First Division (1): 2005–06
- Albanian Cup (2): 2008–09, 2013–14

Labëria

- Kategoria e Tretë (1): 2020
