= Bledar Devolli =

Albanian footballer (born 1978)

Personal information
- Date of birth: 15 January 1978 (age 48)
- Place of birth: Gjirokastër, Albania
- Height: 1.81 m (5 ft 11 in)
- Position: Midfielder

Senior career*
| Years | Team | Apps | (Gls) |
| 1996–1998 | Luftëtari | 44 | (1) |
| 1998–1999 | Bylis | 22 | (1) |
| 2000–2001 | Luftëtari | 33 | (3) |
| 2001–2002 | Tirana | 20 | (1) |
| 2002–2003 | Vllaznia | 24 | (2) |
| 2003–2004 | Tomori | 16 | (0) |
| 2004–2005 | Lushnja | 24 | (3) |
| 2005–2006 | Elbasani | 12 | (1) |
| 2006 | Skënderbeu | 15 | (1) |
| 2006–2007 | Teuta | 28 | (2) |
| 2007–2008 | Partizani | 21 | (1) |
| 2008–2010 | Tirana | 60 | (4) |
| 2010–2011 | Flamurtari | 23 | (1) |
| 2011–2012 | Luftëtari | 28 | (1) |
| 2012–2013 | Shkumbini | 11 | (0) |
| 2013 | Partizani | 12 | (0) |
| Total | | 377 | (22) |

International career
| 1998–2000 | Albania U21 | 8 | (0) |
| 2000 | Albania | 2 | (0) |

Managerial career
- 2014–2015: Luftëtari
- 2016: Kamza
- 2017: Bylis
- 2018: FC KEK
- 2018: Kamza
- 2018−2019: Tomori
- 2019: Kastrioti
- 2019−2020: Tirana U-19
- 2020−2021: Drenica
- 2022: Dinamo Tirana
- 2022: Turbina
- 2022: Akademia e Futbollit U-19
- 2023: Drenica
- 2023: Luzi 2008
- 2024: Kukësi
- 2024: Iliria
- 2024−2025: Liria Prizren
- 2025: Teuta
- 2025: Kukësi
- 2025–: Luftëtari
- * Club domestic league appearances and goals

Bledar Devolli (born 15 January 1978) is an Albanian professional football coach and former player.

== Club career ==
Devolli was released by the Flamurtari chairman Shpëtim Gjika on 19 July 2011, along with three other main players, Daniel Xhafaj, Sebino Plaku and Julian Ahmataj.

He joined Shkumbini on 30 July 2012.

== International career ==
Devolli was first introduced to the national team in 2000 when he was called up to participate in the 2000 Rothmans International Tournament. He made his debut on 6 February by playing in the first half of the opening match versus Andorra which finished in a comfortable 3–0 win. His second appearance occurred two days later against Azerbaijan as Albania won 1–0. In the last match Devolli was rested as Albania defeated hosts of Malta to secure the first place with nine points and the first title.

== Managerial career ==
Devolli started his management career on 8 July 2014 as he became the new coach of his boyhood club Luftëtari for the 2014–15 season. Following the goalless draw against Butrinti on 8 February 2015 which left the team in penultimate position in Albanian First Division, Devolli resigned from his post. His decision was accepted by club board.

On 28 January 2016, Devolli was appointed the new coach of Albanian First Division side Kamza. He left the duty on 26 March of the following year.

On 5 August 2017, Devolli joined fellow First Division side Bylis in their bid to achieve promotion to top flight. He resigned on 4 October following the goalless draw against Turbina.

He was appointed manager of relegation-threatened Kastrioti in January 2019.
