= FC Kamza =

Albanian football club

- Full name: Football Club Kamza
- Nicknames: Kamzalinjtë; Blutë
- Founded: 10 September 1936; 90 years ago
- Dissolved: 2019
- Ground: Kamëz Stadium
- Capacity: 5,500
- 2019–20: Kategoria e Dytë (withdrew)
Home colours	Away colours

Football Club Kamza was a football club based in Kamëz, Albania. Founded on 10 September 1936, the club competed in the lower levels of Albanian football for much of their history, except for the 2011–12 season where they were promoted to the Kategoria Superiore for the first time.

== History ==
=== Background ===
The first game of football to be played in Kamëz took place on 26 July 1908, as a celebration of the Young Turk Revolution which was triggered 16 days earlier by Ahmed Niyazi Bey, who was Albanian. The game was organised by Refik Toptani of the noble Toptani family and it featured two groups of youths from Kamëz and Tiranë, named Tërkuzaj and Agimi respectively. The game took place on a field near Toptani's home, which is the current location of the Sevasti & Parashqevi Qirjazi University, near the Agricultural University of Tirana in Kodër Kamez. Around 1,200 people gathered from across Tiranë area in order to celebrate as well as watch the game, which started at 17:00 and ended in a 3–3 draw. Although the game was not played according to the rules, as there were no field markings or cross bars, it is still considered to be the first game of football to be played in Kamëz, as well as the first ever Tirana derby. The two sides met each other five times in friendlies held between 1908 and 1916, with Terkuzaj Kamëz winning once and Agimi Tiranë winning three times, with the two sides having drawn the first game. Terkuzaj is considered to be the current FC Kamza's preceding club, as it is the first recorded side to have represented Kamëz in a football match, over 28 years before the establishment of Kamza.

=== Early history ===
The club was founded on 10 September 1936 and was named Kamza until 1949, when the club's name was changed to Ndërmarrja Bujqësore e Shtetit Ylli Kuq Kamëz, before being reverted to Kamza in 1950. Between 1953 and 1993, the club was called Dajti Kamëz, after Mount Dajt. Between 1993 and 2001, the club was called Kamza, before being renamed Dajti Kamëz in 2001. In 2009, the club reverted to Kamza.

=== Recent history ===
In November 2006, local businessman Naim Qarri became the president and primary investor of the club, while they were competing in the Albanian Second Division, the third tier of Albanian football. The club finished top of the table in Group B and reached the championship final against Bylis Ballsh, which ended in a 5–3 loss in a penalty shootout following a 1–1 draw over 120 minutes. They were promoted to the Kategoria e Parë for the 2007–08 campaign, where they finished comfortably in mid table with the help of Julian Malo's 14 league goals. The following season proved to be similarly comfortable, as the club finished 6th out of 16 sides. The 2009–10 season proved to be their best to date, as they finished 3rd and qualified for the promotion playoff, but they narrowly missed out on automatic promotion to the Kategoria Superiore on goal difference, with KF Elbasani pipping them to 2nd place. The club faced Skënderbeu Korçë in the promotion playoff on 26 May at the Ruzhdi Bizhuta Stadium in Elbasan, where they lost 1–0 to a 2nd minute Klodian Asllani goal. Kamza continued their good run of form into the following campaign and once again finished 3rd, but due to a change of format they achieved automatic promotion. They sealed promotion to the Kategoria Superiore for the first time in its 75-year history following a 4–1 victory over local rivals Partizani Tirana on 4 May 2011. The following day at the Kamëz Stadium promotion was celebrated, commemorating the history of the club and the historic achievement.

The club hired Ernest Gjoka as head coach and he began putting together a squad in the aim of avoiding relegation in the Kategoria Superiore. The majority of the previous squad was disbanded and several new players were signed in the summer before the club made its top flight debut on 11 September 2011 against Flamurtari Vlorë, which ended in a narrow 2–1 loss. Gledi Mici scored the club's first top flight goal in the 48th minute to level the score, before Halim Begaj scored a late winner for Flamurtari. The club's first win came in the following game against Vllaznia Shkodër, as Eleandro Pema's 47th-minute goal was enough to secure the club's first win in its first top flight home game.

=== Expulsion from Kategoria Superiore ===
On 6 March 2019, Albanian Football Association expelled Kamza from Kategoria Superiore and relegated them to Albanian Second Division after the incidents that occurred during the league match against Laçi three days earlier, when its president Naim Qarri and several fans assaulted match referee Eldorjan Hamiti for giving a 95th-minute penalty in favour of Laçi. Kamza was banned from playing their remaining league matches of the 2018–19 season and was fined 1 million Leks ($9,000). Three Kamza club officials were banned from all sport activities for up to three years.

==== 2019–20 season ====
Following the club's expulsion from the top tier of Albanian football and subsequent relegation to the third tier, Kamza lost the majority of its funding as well as both playing and backroom staff. They failed to field a team in their season opener against Apolonia in the Albanian Cup and as a result, they were banned from the competition for two years.

== Stadium ==
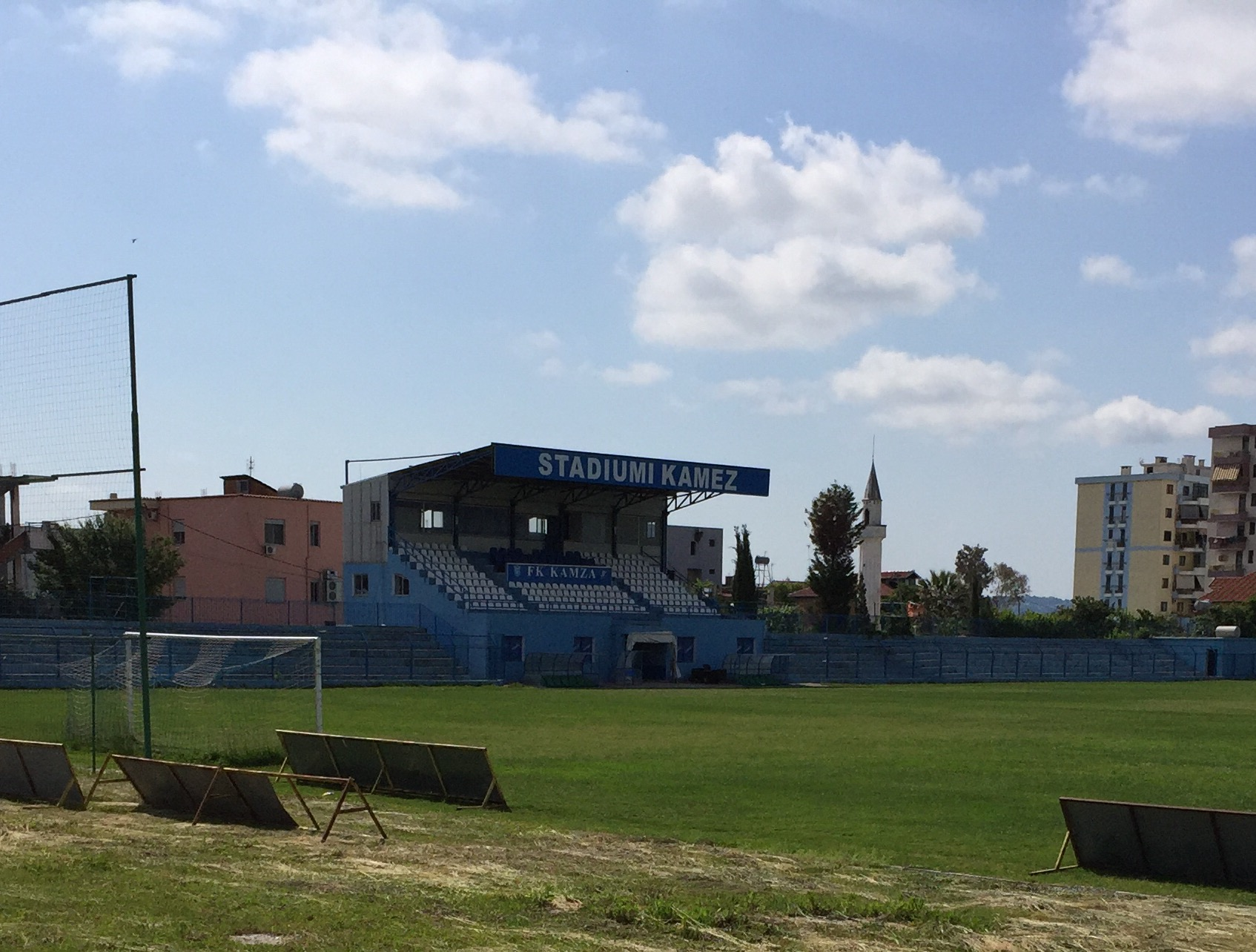
Kamëz Stadium in May 2016.

The club plays its home games at the Kamëz Stadium, which is owned and operated by the Municipality of Kamëz and has a capacity of around 5,500. The stadium was completed in 2008 and it initially had one main stand with a small amount of VIP seating and concrete steps on either side of the main stand for fans to watch games from. The Municipality regularly invested in the stadium to improve the conditions, and in 2012 work began on the construction of a new 1,300 seater stand on the east side of the stadium, opposite the main stand. Stand B was officially completed in February 2014 as 1,300 plastic seats were installed on 9 concrete steps. During the summer of 2016, the playing field was replaced, making it one of the best playing surfaces in not only the Kategoria e Parë but the country.

== Honours ==
FC Kamza honours
Type	Competition	Titles	Seasons/Years
Domestic	Kategoria e Dytë	2	1986–87, 1997–98
Domestic	Kategoria e Parë	1	2016–17

== Players ==
=== Current squad ===
As of 1 January 2020

Note: Flags indicate national team as defined under FIFA eligibility rules; some limited exceptions apply. Players may hold more than one non-FIFA nationality.

No.	Pos.	Nation	Player
1	GK	ALB	Kristi Sulenji
2	DF	ALB	Robert Halilaj
3	DF	ALB	Erion Shima
4	DF	ALB	Florjan Biba
5	DF	ALB	Andi Likaj
5	DF	ALB	Hergi Xhaja
6	DF	ALB	Aldail Gjocaj
7	FW	ALB	Edvin Domi
9	FW	ALB	Franci Bode
9	FW	ALB	Ermal Rizvani

No.	Pos.	Nation	Player
11	MF	ALB	Frenkli Gazheli
11	MF	ALB	Kristi Qepuri
14	MF	ALB	Kadri Mema
15	MF	ALB	Eduart Ferraj
16	MF	ALB	Klevan Kendella
17	MF	ALB	Stefano Llalla
18	DF	ALB	Mariglen Ademi
18	DF	ALB	Albi Balliu
89	MF	ALB	Elson Gjoka
89	MF	ALB	Elid Balla

== List of managers ==
- (Albania) Agustin Kola (2009 - 2010)
- (Albania) Perlat Musta (2010 - 2011)
- (Albania) Eduart Zhupa (Jul 2010 – 22 Nov 2010)
- (Albania) Skerdi Bejzade (22 Nov 2010 – Jun 2011)
- (Albania) Ernest Gjoka (Jul 2011 – 10 Jan 2012)
- (Italy) Mauro De Vecchis (10 Jan 2012 – Jun 2012)
- (Albania) Saimir Malko (Aug 2012 – Oct 2012)
- (Albania) Skerdi Bejzade (Mar 2013 – May 2013)
- (Albania) Ardit Beqiri (Aug 2013 – Feb 2014)
- (Albania) Bledar Devolli (28 Jan 2016 - 26 Mar 2017)
- (Albania) Ramadan Ndreu (Mar 2017 - Apr 2018)
- (Albania) Julian Ahmataj (Apr 2018 - May 2018)
- (Albania) Bledar Devolli (Jul 2018 - 4 Sep 2018)
- (Albania) Klodian Duro (4 Sep 2018 – Nov 2018)
- (Albania) Ernest Gjoka (Nov 2018 – Feb 2019)
- (Albania) Gentian Stojku (Feb 2019 – Mar 2019)
- (Albania) Ergys Luga (25 September 2019 – Oct 2019)
- (Albania) Fatmir Tarja (Oct 2019 – Dec 2019)
- (Albania) Filip Ferra (Dec 2019 –)
