= List of Albanian football transfers summer 2010 =

This is a list of Albanian football transfers in the summer transfer window 2010 by club.

== Superliga ==
=== Besa Kavajë ===
In: Note: Flags indicate national team as defined under FIFA eligibility rules; some limited exceptions apply. Players may hold more than one non-FIFA nationality.

No.	Pos.	Nation	Player
—	DF	MKD	Dimitrija Lazarevski (from (North Macedonia) Metalurg Skopje)
—	DF	MKD	Betim Aliju (from (North Macedonia) Metalurg Skopje)
—	DF	ALB	Akil Jakupi (from Teuta Durrës)
—	FW	BRA	Marko dos Santos (from KS Gramozi Ersekë)
—	MF	MKD	Minas Osmani (from (North Macedonia) Rabotnicki Skopje)
—	FW	ALB	Mateo Hasa (from Youth Team)
—	DF	BIH	Edin Ferizovic (from Shkumbini Peqin)
—	MF	BIH	Semir Hadžibulić (from KS Gramozi Ersekë)
—	FW	BIH	Sead Hadžibulić (from KF Laci)

Out: Note: Flags indicate national team as defined under FIFA eligibility rules; some limited exceptions apply. Players may hold more than one non-FIFA nationality.

No.	Pos.	Nation	Player
9	FW	ALB	Vioresin Sinani (End of contract)
21	MF	ALB	Bledar Mancaku (to Shkumbini Peqin)
8	MF	ALB	Erbim Fagu (to Shkumbini Peqin)
3	DF	ALB	Renato Arapi (End of contract)
5	DF	KOS	Alban Dragusha (End of contract)
22	FW	ALB	Daniel Xhafa (to Flamurtari Vlorë)
1	GK	ALB	Orges Shehi (to Skënderbeu Korçë)
4	DF	ALB	Endrit Vrapi (to Skënderbeu Korçë)

=== KF Tirana ===
In: Note: Flags indicate national team as defined under FIFA eligibility rules; some limited exceptions apply. Players may hold more than one non-FIFA nationality.

No.	Pos.	Nation	Player
21	FW	ALB	Enco Malindi (Loan return from Skënderbeu Korçë)
2	MF	ALB	Migen Metani (Loan return from KS Gramozi Ersekë)
—	MF	ALB	Erand Hoxha (from Besa Kavajë)
28	DF	LVA	Artūrs Silagailis (from (Ukraine) FC Kryvbas Kryvyi Rih)

Out: Note: Flags indicate national team as defined under FIFA eligibility rules; some limited exceptions apply. Players may hold more than one non-FIFA nationality.

No.	Pos.	Nation	Player
16	DF	NGA	Abraham Alechenwu (End of contract)
8	MF	ALB	Jetmir Sefa (End of contract)
20	FW	ALB	Arbër Abilaliaj (End of contract)
14	MF	ALB	Bledar Devolli (to Flamurtari Vlorë)

=== Flamurtari Vlorë ===
In: Note: Flags indicate national team as defined under FIFA eligibility rules; some limited exceptions apply. Players may hold more than one non-FIFA nationality.

No.	Pos.	Nation	Player

Out: Note: Flags indicate national team as defined under FIFA eligibility rules; some limited exceptions apply. Players may hold more than one non-FIFA nationality.

No.	Pos.	Nation	Player
9	FW	ALB	Devis Mema (to Skënderbeu Korçë)
25	FW	ALB	Migen Memelli (to (Saudi Arabia) Al-Faisaly)

=== Vllaznia Shkodër ===
In: Note: Flags indicate national team as defined under FIFA eligibility rules; some limited exceptions apply. Players may hold more than one non-FIFA nationality.

No.	Pos.	Nation	Player
—	GK	MNE	Miroslav Vujadinović (from (Montenegro) FK Budućnost Podgorica)

Out: Note: Flags indicate national team as defined under FIFA eligibility rules; some limited exceptions apply. Players may hold more than one non-FIFA nationality.

No.	Pos.	Nation	Player
31	GK	ALB	Olti Bishani (Released)
19	FW	ALB	Bekim Bala (to (Turkey) Gençlerbirliği S.K.)

=== Shkumbini Peqin ===
In: Note: Flags indicate national team as defined under FIFA eligibility rules; some limited exceptions apply. Players may hold more than one non-FIFA nationality.

No.	Pos.	Nation	Player
—	MF	ALB	Bledar Mancaku (from Besa Kavajë)
—	MF	ALB	Erbim Fagu (from Besa Kavajë)
—	FW	ALB	Bekim Kuli (from Dinamo Tirana)
—	FW	ALB	Arlind Nora (from KF Laçi)

Out: Note: Flags indicate national team as defined under FIFA eligibility rules; some limited exceptions apply. Players may hold more than one non-FIFA nationality.

No.	Pos.	Nation	Player

=== Teuta Durrës ===
In: Note: Flags indicate national team as defined under FIFA eligibility rules; some limited exceptions apply. Players may hold more than one non-FIFA nationality.

No.	Pos.	Nation	Player
—	FW	ALB	Erlis Frashëri (from Skënderbeu Korçë)
—	MF	ALB	Brunild Pepa (from KS Lushnja)
—	MF	ALB	Alsid Tafili (from (Kosovo) Liria Prizren)

Out: Note: Flags indicate national team as defined under FIFA eligibility rules; some limited exceptions apply. Players may hold more than one non-FIFA nationality.

No.	Pos.	Nation	Player
—	DF	ALB	Akil Jakupi (to Besa Kavajë)

=== Skënderbeu Korçë ===
In: Note: Flags indicate national team as defined under FIFA eligibility rules; some limited exceptions apply. Players may hold more than one non-FIFA nationality.

No.	Pos.	Nation	Player

Out: Note: Flags indicate national team as defined under FIFA eligibility rules; some limited exceptions apply. Players may hold more than one non-FIFA nationality.

No.	Pos.	Nation	Player
—	FW	ALB	Devis Mema (from Flamurtari Vlore)

=== Apolonia Fier ===
In: Note: Flags indicate national team as defined under FIFA eligibility rules; some limited exceptions apply. Players may hold more than one non-FIFA nationality.

No.	Pos.	Nation	Player

Out: Note: Flags indicate national team as defined under FIFA eligibility rules; some limited exceptions apply. Players may hold more than one non-FIFA nationality.

No.	Pos.	Nation	Player
9	FW	SRB	Mladen Brkić (End of contract)

=== Gramozi Ersekë ===
In: Note: Flags indicate national team as defined under FIFA eligibility rules; some limited exceptions apply. Players may hold more than one non-FIFA nationality.

No.	Pos.	Nation	Player

Out: Note: Flags indicate national team as defined under FIFA eligibility rules; some limited exceptions apply. Players may hold more than one non-FIFA nationality.

No.	Pos.	Nation	Player
4	DF	ALB	Klodian Semina (to (Cyprus) Ermis Aradippou)
