= List of Albanian football transfers summer 2011 =

This is a list of Albanian football transfers in the summer transfer window 2011 by club.

== Superliga ==
=== Apolonia Fier ===
In: Note: Flags indicate national team as defined under FIFA eligibility rules; some limited exceptions apply. Players may hold more than one non-FIFA nationality.

No.	Pos.	Nation	Player
—	GK	ALB	Klodian Xhelilaj (from KF Vlora)
—	GK	ALB	Andi Xhixha (from KS Burreli)
—	DF	ALB	Armando Mehmetaj (from KF Elbasani)
—	MF	ALB	Armando Pasha (from KF Laçi)
—	MF	ALB	Oliver Pepaj (from Tërbuni Pukë)
—	FW	ALB	Renaldo Rama (Free agent)

Out: Note: Flags indicate national team as defined under FIFA eligibility rules; some limited exceptions apply. Players may hold more than one non-FIFA nationality.

No.	Pos.	Nation	Player
—	GK	ALB	Egland Haxho (To KS Kamza)
—	DF	ALB	Marsel Rushani (To SK Himarë)
—	DF	ALB	Erald Elmazi (To SK Himarë)
—	DF	ALB	Ermal Goro (To SK Himarë)
—	MF	ALB	Arbër Monë (To SK Himarë)
—	MF	ALB	Olsi Teqja (To Bylis Ballsh)
—	MF	SRB	Miloš Jevđević (Free agent)

=== KF Tirana ===
In: Note: Flags indicate national team as defined under FIFA eligibility rules; some limited exceptions apply. Players may hold more than one non-FIFA nationality.

No.	Pos.	Nation	Player
21	FW	ALB	Enco Malindi (Loan return from Skënderbeu Korçë)
2	MF	ALB	Migen Metani (Loan return from KS Gramozi Ersekë)
—	MF	ALB	Erand Hoxha (from Besa Kavajë)
28	DF	LVA	Artūrs Silagailis (from (Ukraine) FC Kryvbas Kryvyi Rih)

Out: Note: Flags indicate national team as defined under FIFA eligibility rules; some limited exceptions apply. Players may hold more than one non-FIFA nationality.

No.	Pos.	Nation	Player
16	DF	NGA	Abraham Alechenwu (End of contract)
8	MF	ALB	Jetmir Sefa (End of contract)
20	FW	ALB	Arbër Abilaliaj (End of contract)
14	MF	ALB	Bledar Devolli (to Flamurtari Vlorë)

=== Flamurtari Vlorë ===
In: Note: Flags indicate national team as defined under FIFA eligibility rules; some limited exceptions apply. Players may hold more than one non-FIFA nationality.

No.	Pos.	Nation	Player

Out: Note: Flags indicate national team as defined under FIFA eligibility rules; some limited exceptions apply. Players may hold more than one non-FIFA nationality.

No.	Pos.	Nation	Player
9	FW	ALB	Devis Mema (to Skënderbeu Korçë)
25	FW	ALB	Migen Memelli (to (Saudi Arabia) Al-Faisaly)

=== Vllaznia Shkodër ===
In: Note: Flags indicate national team as defined under FIFA eligibility rules; some limited exceptions apply. Players may hold more than one non-FIFA nationality.

No.	Pos.	Nation	Player
—	GK	MNE	Miroslav Vujadinović (from (Montenegro) FK Budućnost Podgorica)

Out: Note: Flags indicate national team as defined under FIFA eligibility rules; some limited exceptions apply. Players may hold more than one non-FIFA nationality.

No.	Pos.	Nation	Player
31	GK	ALB	Olti Bishani (Released)
19	FW	ALB	Bekim Bala (to (Turkey) Gençlerbirliği S.K.)

=== Shkumbini Peqin ===
In: Note: Flags indicate national team as defined under FIFA eligibility rules; some limited exceptions apply. Players may hold more than one non-FIFA nationality.

No.	Pos.	Nation	Player
—	MF	ALB	Bledar Mancaku (from Besa Kavajë)
—	MF	ALB	Erbim Fagu (from Besa Kavajë)
—	FW	ALB	Bekim Kuli (from Dinamo Tirana)
—	FW	ALB	Arlind Nora (from KF Laçi)

Out: Note: Flags indicate national team as defined under FIFA eligibility rules; some limited exceptions apply. Players may hold more than one non-FIFA nationality.

No.	Pos.	Nation	Player

=== Teuta Durrës ===
In: Note: Flags indicate national team as defined under FIFA eligibility rules; some limited exceptions apply. Players may hold more than one non-FIFA nationality.

No.	Pos.	Nation	Player
—	FW	ALB	Erlis Frashëri (from Skënderbeu Korçë)
—	MF	ALB	Brunild Pepa (from KS Lushnja)
—	MF	ALB	Alsid Tafili (from (Kosovo) Liria Prizren)

Out: Note: Flags indicate national team as defined under FIFA eligibility rules; some limited exceptions apply. Players may hold more than one non-FIFA nationality.

No.	Pos.	Nation	Player
—	DF	ALB	Akil Jakupi (to Besa Kavajë)

=== Skënderbeu Korçë ===
In: Note: Flags indicate national team as defined under FIFA eligibility rules; some limited exceptions apply. Players may hold more than one non-FIFA nationality.

No.	Pos.	Nation	Player

Out: Note: Flags indicate national team as defined under FIFA eligibility rules; some limited exceptions apply. Players may hold more than one non-FIFA nationality.

No.	Pos.	Nation	Player
—	FW	ALB	Devis Mema (from Flamurtari Vlore)

=== Apolonia Fier ===
In: Note: Flags indicate national team as defined under FIFA eligibility rules; some limited exceptions apply. Players may hold more than one non-FIFA nationality.

No.	Pos.	Nation	Player

Out: Note: Flags indicate national team as defined under FIFA eligibility rules; some limited exceptions apply. Players may hold more than one non-FIFA nationality.

No.	Pos.	Nation	Player
9	FW	SRB	Mladen Brkić (End of contract)

=== Gramozi Ersekë ===
In: Note: Flags indicate national team as defined under FIFA eligibility rules; some limited exceptions apply. Players may hold more than one non-FIFA nationality.

No.	Pos.	Nation	Player

Out: Note: Flags indicate national team as defined under FIFA eligibility rules; some limited exceptions apply. Players may hold more than one non-FIFA nationality.

No.	Pos.	Nation	Player
4	DF	ALB	Klodian Semina (to (Cyprus) Ermis Aradippou)
