= 2015–16 FK Kukësi season =

FK Kukësi
2015–16 season
- President: Safet Gjici
- Head coach: Marcello Troisi (until 8 November 2015); Klodian Duro (from 24 November 2015)
- Stadium: Zeqir Ymeri Stadium, Kukës
- Kategoria Superiore: 3rd
- Albanian Cup: Winners
- Top goalscorer: League: Izair Emini & Mateus Lima (7); All: Mateus Lima (10)
- Highest home attendance: 7,000 vs Partizani Tirana (25 April 2016, Kategoria Superiore)
| Home colours | Away colours |

The 2015–16 season is FK Kukësi's 4th consecutive season in the Kategoria Superiore and 86th year in existence as a football club.

== Season overview ==
=== June ===
In the late days of May, fullbacks Erjon Dushku and Dritan Smajli announced their departure from the club after terminating their respective contracts by mutual consensus. Their departures were followed by the departure of the Brazilian left-back Márcio Pit, whose contract expired and the club refused to extend it. On 12 June, Kukësi acquired the services of Tirana's center-back Gentian Muça for the club's European campaign. One day later, Hair Zeqiri was released from the club after his contract was not extended.

On 16 June, Kukësi parted ways with the goalkeeper Argjent Halili and midfielder Yll Hoxha after three seasons of cooperating. Kukësi went to Austria to make its preparation phase in order to be ready for the European campaign. There, the club played for friendly matches respectively against Slovan Bratislava, Botoșani, MTK Budapest, Neftçi Baki and Universitatea Craiova.

On 24 June, Kukësi signed with four Brazilian players, consisting of Erick Flores, Jean Carioca, Felipe Moreira and Birungueta. They all signed one-year deals and went to Austria to link up with the rest of the squad. On 28 June, Kushtrim Lushtaku announced his departure after terminating his cooperating with the club. One day later, the club president Safet Gjici confirmed that Muça is going to play with Kukësi for the entire 2015–16 season, but Muça's parent club denied his claims.

=== July ===
Kukësi started its European campaign on 2 July in the match at Qemal Stafa Stadium against Torpedo-BelAZ Zhodino for the Europa League first qualifying round. Veriorët won the first leg thanks to the goals of Jean Carioca and Pero Pejić. In the returning leg one week later at Torpedo Stadium, Kukësi were able to hold off Torpedo-BelAZ Zhodino by gaining a goalless draw, despite the fact that Pejić missed a penalty-kick.

After securing the qualify to the second qualifying round, four days later, Kukësi signed on a free transfer the midfielder Ansi Nika from Teuta Durrës. On 16 July, in the first leg of the second qualifying round against Mladost Podgorica, Kukësi was defeated 1–0 at home, fading the chances to go on the third qualifying round. On the same day, Albi Dosti transferred to Bulgarian side Montana on a two-year contract. Six days later, Roland Peqini announced his departure from the club to sign with fellow Kategoria Superiore side Tërbuni Pukë.

In the returning leg at Podgorica City Stadium, Kukësi made history by overturning the 1–0 disadvantage to prevail 4–2, a match which was infamously marred by host crowd with their racist crusts. On 26 July, the club signed with the Brazilian striker Mateus Lima as a replacement for the fellow striker Pero Pejić. Four days later, Kukësi lost 3–0 to Legia Warsaw in the first leg of the third qualifying round after UEFA awarded Legia Warsaw with a 3–0 win after a Legia Warsaw player was hit in the head by an object thrown from the crowd. The original match was abandoned in the 52nd minute with a 2–1 lead for Legia Warsaw.

=== August ===
On 2 August, Dmitri Stajila returned to his partent club Sheriff Tiraspol following the end of his loan spell at Kukësi. On the same day, Pero Pejić, the club's top goalscorer last season, left the team to join the Persian Gulf Pro League side Esteghlal for an undisclosed fee. Two days later, the club signed with Renaldo Rama from the Greek side Fostiras. On 6 August, in the returning leg against Legia Warsaw, Kukësi suffered another defeat, this time 1–0 away, and was eliminated with the aggregate 4–0. Four days later, Vilfor Hysa announced his departure on 10 August 2015 following the expiration of his contract with the club. Following the end of European campaign, Gentian Muça returned to his parent club Tirana.

Kukësi started its domestic season on 23 August with a 2–0 home victory against the newcomers of Bylis Ballsh thanks to the goals of Mateus Lima and Erick Flores. This victory was followed by a 1–0 away lose to Skënderbeu Korçë six days later. On the last day of the month, Kukësi brought the last reinforcements in the squad, signing Eglantin Dhima from Sopoti Librazhd, Franc Veliu from Flamurtari Vlorë, Enea Koliqi from Olympiacos Volos and Leomir Cruz from Marília.

=== September ===
The new month was opened in strong fashion with a 3–0 home win against Teuta Durrës. To begin its Albanian Cup campaign, Kukësi played its first leg match away at Naftëtari Kuçovë which ended with a 3–1 defeat. Back in Kategoria Superiore, the loss was followed by another one three days later as Kukësi fell to Partizani Tirana with the result 2–0.

On 24 September, the midfielder Edon Hasani was fined by the club president with one month of wage for not participating in the match against Partizani Tirana after he heard that was not in the starting lineup for the match. In the next league match against Flamurtari Vlorë one week later at home, the team returned to the winning ways with a 1–0 win thanks to the late goal of Mateus Lima. On 30 September, in the returning leg against Naftëtari Kuçovë, Kukësi was able to come back with a 4–1 home victory and a 5–4 win on aggregate to reach the second round of the Albanian Cup.

=== October ===
Kukësi began October with a 1–1 away disappointing draw against the league strugglers Vllaznia Shkodër. The team was on lead until 93rd minute when Vllaznia Shkodër's Jetmir Sefa levelled the score with a set-piece. In the next league match against Laçi at home, Kukësi were able to clinch three points with a Renato Malota goal in the 88th minute.

The first leg of the Albanian Cup second round, played on 21 October, ended in a 5–0 win against Iliria Fushë-Krujë. The club followed-up with its second-straight Kategoria Superiore victory over Tërbuni Pukë on 25 October. Mateus Lima scored the only goal of the match in the 10th minute. On the same day, Franc Veliu was arrested for driving his car in drunk condition.

=== November ===
Matchday 9 for Kukësi in Kategoria Superiore ended with a 2–1 away loss to Tirana, as the Mici's late goal was not enough. For this heavy lose the club directors blamed the match officials. On 4 November, in the returning leg of Albanian Cup second round, the team overwhelmed 3–0 Iliria Fushë-Krujë at home, securing an 8–1 aggregate victory and progression to the quarter-finals. Two goals from Mateus Lima and one strike from Bledar Musolli secured the victory. Four days later, in the tenth round of the league against Bylis Ballsh, Jean Carioca gave his team the lead in the 70th minute thanks to a penalty-kick, but Gava levelled for Bylis in the last minutes of the match, with the match finishing in a 1–1 draw.

In the second match of the season against Skënderbeu Korçë, Kukësi won 2–1 thanks to goals of Mateus Lima in each half of the match. However, four days later, Kukësi fell to Teuta Durrës 0–1 at the Niko Dovana Stadium, with a goal by Bruno Dita deciding the match. On 24 November, Marcello Troisi was sacked as manager of Kukësi one day after Kukësi's loss to Teuta Durrës in the league. He was replaced by the former international player Klodian Duro, who would share his position with Hasan Lika. The duo didn't make a decent debut in charge of the team as Kukësi suffered its second consecutive league defeat, this time at the hands of Partizani Tirana.

=== December ===
Kukësi begun December with an unconvincing 1–0 win over relegation scrappers Flamurtari Vlorë. Ivan Fuštar scored an own goal in the 42nd minute. Kukësi then beat Vllaznia Shkodër 1–0 away through the goal of Edon Hasani in the 77th minute. Following back-to-back victory, for Kukësi would come back-to-back draws against league opponents Laçi and Tërbuni Pukë; both matches ended 1–1.

In the last match of the year, Kukësi suffered a sixth league loss, this time at the hands of Tirana who won 1–0 at Zeqir Ymeri Stadium thanks to the goal of Gentian Muça; it was Tirana's first ever win at Kukës.

=== January ===
On 4 January, in first days of the winter transfer window, Kukësi announced an agreement with Tërbuni Pukë for the transfer of defender Roland Peqini, who returned in Kukës after more than a half year. A day later, Kukësi signed with the youngster Mergent Sulmataj, another player from the newcomers of Tërbuni Pukë. On 6 January, it was officially announced that Kukësi had acquired the services of Croatian forward Matija Dvorneković from Gorica. On the next day, the club signed with the ethnic Albanian player Izair Emini on a free transfer; Emini signed an initial 6-month contract with the option of a further 2 years.

On 18 January, Peqini was suddenly released from the club after only 14 days in the team. He later blamed the coach Klodian Duro for his departure. Two days later, Nertil Ferraj joined the club on a free transfer following his departure from Teuta Durrës, signing a contract until the end of the season. On the next day, Kukësi signed with Eni Imami from Albanian First Division side Dinamo Tirana.

On 23 January, in the first leg of the Albanian Cup quarter-final, Kukësi fell 1–0 to in a 1–0 to Teuta Durrës at Niko Dovana Stadium. Four days later, the club signed with the forward Mario Morina on a free transfer, who was convinced to join the club by the coach and his former teammate Klodian Duro. On 29 January, Kukësi signed with Croatian striker Mario Mijatović, and also sold Klaudio Çema to Tërbuni Pukë.

On 31 January, in the first league match of the new year, Kukësi recorded a 3–0 home victory against the league strugglers Bylis Ballsh. Izar Emini scored twice while Dvorneković scored the third goal of the match.

=== February ===
In the first day of the new month, Kukësi signed with Kosovar defender Lapidar Lladrovci from Feronikeli and with Resul Kastrati from Teuta Durrës on loan until 30 June 2016. On the same day, Franc Veliu left the club after failing to make an impact in the team and joined on a free transfer to the rivals of Partizani Tirana. Six days later, Kukësi was defeated 3–1 at the hands of Skënderbeu Korçë at Skënderbeu Stadium. Dvorneković's strike was not enough to secure a point at Korçë. On 13 February, Kukësi played-out a hard-fought 2–2 home draw away against Teuta Durrës in the matchday 21 of Kategoria Superiore.

In the first leg of the Albanian Cup's quarter-finals, played on 17 February, Kukësi changed the face and overwhelmed Teuta Durrës 2–0 at the Zeqir Ymeri Stadium. Shameti and Malota where the scorers for this important win. Back in Kategoria Superiore, Kukësi suffered another league defeat, this time to Partizani Tirana who won 1–0 at home thanks to the lone goal of Sukaj. In the last match of the month, Kukësi defeated 4–0 at home Flamurtari Vlorë, with two goals scored by Hasani and one each for Emini and Erick Flores.

=== March ===
Kukësi begun March with a 2–1 away win against Vllaznia Shkodër, who scored first with the defender Vrapi, but Kukësi bounced back with the goals of Emini and Hasani. This win was followed by back-to-back 1–0 victories respectively against Laçi and Tërbuni Pukë. It was the striker Izair Emini who scored in both matches.

In the next league match and the last for this month, Kukësi played Tirana at Selman Stërmasi Stadium. Tirana took the lead in the first half thanks to a Muzaka header, but Erick Flores levelled for Kukësi.

=== April ===
On 2 April, Kukësi won three important points in their bit for a European spot after beating Bylis Ballsh 2–0 away thanks to the goals of Dvorneković and Erick Flores, both in the first half. Four days later, in the first leg of Albanian Cup's semi-final, Kukësi easily conquered Flamurtari Vlorë 2–0 at home thanks to the goals of Emini and Erick Flores. On 20 April, in the returning leg of Albanian Cup, Kukësi recorded another 2–0 win against Flamurtari, securing a 4–0 aggregate victory and progression in the final for the second consecutive season.

In the matchday 31, Kukësi played Partizani Tirana at home; Partizani Tirana won 1–0 thanks to a last-minute winner from Sukaj with a free-kick, causing Kukësi the first loss after ten matches between league and cup; The last loss for Kukësi was against Partizani Tirana, which has defeated Kukësi in all league matches this season. In the last league match of the season, Kukësi defeated Flamurtari with the result 1–0. Dvorneković scored the winner in the second half, returning the team in the winning ways.

== Players ==
=== Squad information ===
As of 14 February 2016

| Squad No. | Name | Nationality | Position(s) | Date of birth (age) |
Goalkeepers
| 12 | Ervis Koçi | (Albania) | GK | 13 November 1984 (aged 30) |
| 31 | Enea Koliqi | (Albania) | GK | 13 February 1986 (aged 29) |
Defenders
| 4 | Ylli Shameti | (Albania) | CB/DMF | 7 June 1984 (aged 31) |
| 5 | Rexhep Memini | (Albania) | RB/LB/MF | 13 August 1988 (aged 26) |
| 7 | Gledi Mici | (Albania) | LB | 6 February 1991 (aged 24) |
| 13 | Rrahman Hallaçi (captain) | (Albania) | CB | 27 July 1988 (aged 26) |
| 15 | Marvin Turtulli | (Albania) | CB | 17 October 1994 (aged 20) |
| 24 | Renato Malota | (Albania) | CB | 24 June 1989 (aged 26) |
| 30 | Lapidar Lladrovci | (Kosovo) | CB | 24 June 1989 (aged 26) |
| – | Arbër Mone | (Albania) | RB/LB/CB | 8 June 1988 (aged 27) |
| – | Resul Kastrati | (Albania) | CB | 20 March 1994 (aged 21) |
Midfielders
| 10 | Jean Carioca | (Brazil) | AMF | 1 June 1988 (aged 27) |
| 16 | Edon Hasani | (Albania) | CMF/LMF/RMF | 9 January 1992 (aged 23) |
| 17 | Ansi Nika | (Albania) | MF | 20 August 1990 (aged 24) |
| 18 | Nertil Ferraj | (Albania) | CMF/LMF/LB | 11 September 1987 (aged 27) |
| 19 | Eni Imami | (Albania) | LMF | 19 December 1992 (aged 22) |
| 22 | Birungueta | (Brazil) | CMF | 17 August 1993 (aged 21) |
| 23 | Besar Musolli | (Kosovo) | DMF | 28 February 1989 (aged 26) |
Forwards
| 8 | Izair Emini | (North Macedonia) | FW | 4 October 1985 (aged 29) |
| 9 | Erick Flores | (Brazil) | AMF/FW | 30 April 1989 (aged 26) |
| 11 | Mario Morina | (Albania) | FW | 16 October 1992 (aged 22) |
| 18 | Mario Mijatović | (Croatia) | FW | 24 October 1980 (aged 34) |
| 19 | Mateus Lima | (Brazil) | FW | 18 January 1993 (aged 22) |
| 21 | Matija Dvorneković | (Croatia) | FW | 1 October 1989 (aged 25) |
| 25 | Williams Recife | (Brazil) | FW | 29 June 1986 (aged 29) |
| 26 | Edison Qafa | (Albania) | FW | 16 November 1989 (aged 25) |
| – | Mergent Sulmataj | (Albania) | FW | 16 October 1996 (aged 18) |

== Transfers ==
=== In ===
==== Summer ====
| Date | Pos. | Nationality | Player | Age | Moving from | Fee | Notes | Ref |
|---|---|---|---|---|---|---|---|---|
| 12 June 2015 | DF | (Albania) | Gentian Muça | 28 | Tirana | Free | Only for Europa League campaign | |
| 24 June 2015 | MF | (Brazil) | Erick Flores | 26 | Boavista | Free | | |
| 24 June 2015 | MF | (Brazil) | Jean Carioca | 27 | Tigres do Brasil | Free | | |
| 24 June 2015 | MF | (Brazil) | Birungueta | 21 | Linense | Free | | |
| 24 June 2015 | MF | (Brazil) | Felipe Moreira | 26 | Alecrim | Free | | |
| 13 July 2015 | MF | (Albania) | Ansi Nika | 24 | Teuta Durrës | Free | | |
| 26 July 2015 | FW | (Brazil) | Mateus Lima | 22 | Skënderbeu Korçë | Free | | |
| 4 August 2015 | FW | (Albania) | Renaldo Rama | 21 | Fostiras | Free | | |
| 31 August 2015 | MF | (Albania) | Eglantin Dhima | 25 | Sopoti Librazhd | Free | | |
| 31 August 2015 | DF | (Albania) | Franc Veliu | 26 | Flamurtari Vlorë | Free | | |
| 31 August 2015 | GK | (Albania) | Enea Koliqi | 29 | Olympiacos Volos | Free | | |
| 31 August 2015 | MF | (Brazil) | Leomir Cruz | 28 | Marília | Free | | |

==== Winter ====
| Date | Pos. | Nationality | Player | Age | Moving from | Fee | Notes | Ref |
|---|---|---|---|---|---|---|---|---|
| 4 January 2016 | DF | (Albania) | Roland Peqini | 25 | Tërbuni Pukë | Free | | |
| 5 January 2016 | MF | (Albania) | Mergent Sulmataj | 19 | Tërbuni Pukë | Free | | |
| 6 January 2016 | FW | (Croatia) | Matija Dvorneković | 27 | Gorica | Free | | |
| 7 January 2016 | FW | (North Macedonia) | Izair Emini | 30 | Renova | Free | | |
| 20 January 2016 | MF | (Albania) | Nertil Ferraj | 28 | Teuta Durrës | Free | | |
| 21 January 2016 | MF | (Albania) | Eni Imami | 23 | Dinamo Tirana | Free | | |
| 27 January 2016 | FW | (Albania) | Mario Morina | 23 | Flamurtari Vlorë | Free | | |
| 29 January 2016 | FW | (Croatia) | Mario Mijatović | 35 | Balmazújvárosi | Free | | |
| 1 February 2016 | DF | (Kosovo) | Lapidar Lladrovci | 25 | Feronikeli | Free | | |
| 1 February 2016 | FW | (Albania) | Resul Kastrati | 21 | Teuta Durrës | N/A | On loan until June 2016 | |

=== Out ===
==== Summer ====
| Date | Pos. | Nationality | Player | Age | Moving to | Fee | Notes | Ref |
|---|---|---|---|---|---|---|---|---|
| 21 May 2015 | DF | (Albania) | Dritan Smajli | 30 | Free agent | Free | | |
| 21 May 2015 | DF | (Albania) | Erjon Dushku | 30 | Free agent | Free | | |
| 31 May 2015 | DF | (Brazil) | Márcio Pit | 26 | Free agent | Free | | |
| 13 June 2015 | MF | (Albania) | Hair Zeqiri | 26 | Free agent | Free | | |
| 16 June 2015 | GK | (Albania) | Argjent Halili | 32 | Free agent | Free | | |
| 16 June 2015 | MF | (Kosovo) | Yll Hoxha | 27 | Flamurtari Vlorë | Free | | |
| 28 June 2015 | MF | (Kosovo) | Kushtrim Lushtaku | 25 | Free agent | Free | | |
| 16 July 2015 | MF | (Albania) | Albi Dosti | 23 | Montana | Free | | |
| 22 July 2015 | DF | (Albania) | Roland Peqini | 24 | Tërbuni Pukë | Undisclosed | | |
| 2 August 2015 | GK | (Moldova) | Dumitru Stajila | 24 | Sheriff Tiraspol | Free | Loan return | |
| 2 August 2015 | FW | (Croatia) | Pero Pejić | 32 | Esteghlal | Undisclosed | | |
| 10 August 2015 | FW | (Albania) | Vilfor Hysa | 25 | Free agent | Free | | |
| 11 August 2015 | DF | (Albania) | Gentian Muça | 28 | Tirana | Free | Loan return | |

==== Winter ====
| Date | Pos. | Nationality | Player | Age | Moving to | Fee | Notes | Ref |
|---|---|---|---|---|---|---|---|---|
| 18 January 2016 | DF | (Albania) | Roland Peqini | 25 | Free agent | Free | | |
| 29 January 2016 | DF | (Albania) | Klaudio Çema | 20 | Tërbuni Pukë | Free | | |
| 1 February 2016 | DF | (Albania) | Franc Veliu | 27 | Partizani Tirana | Free | | |
| 4 February 2016 | MF | (Albania) | Eglantin Dhima | 22 | Sopoti Librazhd | Free | | |

== Competitions ==
=== Kategoria Superiore ===
==== League table ====
| Pos | Team | Pld | W | D | L | GF | GA | GD | Pts | Qualification or relegation |
|---|---|---|---|---|---|---|---|---|---|---|
| 1 | Skënderbeu (Note: Skënderbeu would have qualified for the Champions League second qualifying round, but were excluded from participating in the 2016–17 European competitions by UEFA for match-fixing.) (C) | 36 | 25 | 4 | 7 | 73 | 27 | +46 | 79 | |
| 2 | Partizani | 36 | 21 | 11 | 4 | 51 | 21 | +30 | 74 | Qualification for the Champions League second qualifying round |
| 3 | Kukësi | 36 | 18 | 9 | 9 | 41 | 25 | +16 | 63 (Note: Kukësi ahead of Teuta on head-to-head record; Kukësi–Teuta 3–0, Teuta–Kukësi 1–0, Kukësi–Teuta 2–2, Teuta–Kukësi 0–0.) | Qualification for the Europa League first qualifying round (Note: Kukësi qualified for the Europa League first qualifying round by winning the 2015–16 Albanian Cup.) |
| 4 | Teuta | 36 | 18 | 9 | 9 | 43 | 28 | +15 | 63 | Qualification for the Europa League first qualifying round |
| 5 | Tirana | 36 | 13 | 14 | 9 | 37 | 25 | +12 | 53 | |

Source: Albanian Football Association (in Albanian), Soccerway
Rules for classification: 1) Points; 2) Head-to-head points; 3) Head-to-head goal difference; 4) Head-to-head goals scored; 5) Goal difference; 6) Goals scored; 7) Draw.
(C) Champions

==== Results summary ====
| Overall | | | | | | | | Home | | | | | | Away | | | | | |
| Pld | W | D | L | GF | GA | GD | Pts | W | D | L | GF | GA | GD | W | D | L | GF | GA | GD |
|---|---|---|---|---|---|---|---|---|---|---|---|---|---|---|---|---|---|---|---|
| 36 | 18 | 9 | 9 | 41 | 25 | +16 | 63 | 13 | 2 | 3 | 25 | 7 | +18 | 5 | 7 | 6 | 16 | 18 | −2 |

Last updated: 18 May 2016.
