= 2007–08 KF Tirana season =

Tirana
2007–08 season
- Chairman: (Albania) Bamir Topi
- Manager: Sulejman Starova (until 29 September 2007); Ardian Mema (interim) (Albania) Astrit Hafizi (until 3 February 2008); Sulejman Mema
- Kategoria Superiore: 6th
- Albanian Supercup: Winners
- Albanian Cup: Runners-up
- Champions League: First qualifying round
- Top goalscorer: League: Klodian Duro (16); All: Klodian Duro (22)
Home colours	Away colours

The 2007–08 season was Klubi i Futbollit Tirana's 69th competitive season in the Kategoria Superiore and 87th year in existence as a football club. It covered a period from 1 July 2007 to 30 June 2008.

== Squad ==
Note: Flags indicate national team as defined under FIFA eligibility rules; some limited exceptions apply. Players may hold more than one non-FIFA nationality.

No.	Pos.	Nation	Player
—	GK	ALB	Blendi Nallbani
—	GK	ALB	Isli Hidi
—	GK	ALB	Alfred Osmani
—	GK	ALB	Klajdi Kuka
—	DF	ALB	Nevil Dede
—	DF	MKD	Saso Gjoreski
—	DF	ALB	Gentian Hajdari
—	DF	CRO	Lek Kcira
—	DF	ALB	Elvis Sina
—	DF	ALB	Endrit Vrapi
—	DF	ALB	Kipjon Kazazi
—	DF	ALB	Erion Xhafa
—	DF	ALB	Engert Bakalli
—	MF	FRA	Laurent Mohellebi
—	MF	CRO	Danijel Hrman
—	MF	ALB	Hetlem Çapja

No.	Pos.	Nation	Player
—	MF	ALB	Erald Deliallisi
—	MF	ALB	Oriand Abazaj
—	MF	ALB	Florenc Arapi
—	MF	ALB	Jetmir Sefa
—	MF	ALB	Klodian Duro
—	MF	ALB	Jahmir Hyka
—	MF	ALB	Eldorado Merkoçi
—	MF	ALB	Devis Mukaj (captain)
—	MF	ALB	Fatjon Muhameti
—	MF	ALB	Erbim Fagu
—	MF	ALB	Blerti Hajdari
—	FW	ALB	Indrit Fortuzi
—	FW	KOS	Berat Hyseni
—	FW	ALB	Daniel Xhafa
—	FW	ALB	Ergys Sorra

== Competitions ==
=== Albanian Supercup ===
Win Draw Loss

17 August 2007 Final	Tirana	4–2	Besa Kavajë	Tirana
	Muka 6'; Dede 49'; Duro 70'; Abazaj 90'		Hoxha 16'; Veliaj 35'	Stadium: Qemal Stafa Stadium

=== Kategoria Superiore ===
==== League table ====
Pos	Team	Pld	W	D	L	GF	GA	GD	Pts	Qualification or relegation
4	Elbasani	33	13	13	7	40	24	+16	52	
5	Shkumbini	33	14	8	11	35	28	+7	50	
6	Tirana	33	14	7	12	46	36	+10	49	
7	Vllaznia	33	12	9	12	46	46	0	45	Qualification for the UEFA Cup first qualifying round (Note: Vllaznia qualified for the UEFA Cup first qualifying round by winning the 2007–08 Albanian Cup.)
8	Flamurtari	33	10	14	9	35	37	−2	44	

Source: Albanian Football Association (in Albanian), Soccerway
Rules for classification: 1) points; 2) points in head-to-head matches; 3) goal difference in head-to-head matches; 4) goals scored in head-to-head matches; 5) total goal difference; 6) total goals scored; 7) draw

==== Results summary ====
Overall								Home						Away					
Pld	W	D	L	GF	GA	GD	Pts	W	D	L	GF	GA	GD	W	D	L	GF	GA	GD
33	14	7	12	46	36	+10	49	8	4	4	26	15	+11	6	3	8	20	21	−1

Last updated: 31 January 2019.
Source: Competitive matches

==== Results by round ====
Round	1	2	3	4	5	6	7	8	9	10	11	12	13	14	15	16	17	18	19	20	21	22	23	24	25	26	27	28	29	30	31	32	33
Ground	A	H	A	H	A	H	A	H	A	H	A	H	A	H	A	H	A	H	A	H	A	H	H	A	H	H	A	H	A	H	A	H	A
Result	L	W	L	L	L	D	D	D	W	W	D	W	W	W	W	W	L	D	W	D	D	L	W	L	W	W	L	W	L	L	L	L	W
Position	9	6	7	9	10	9	9	9	9	8	8	7	6	6	4	3	5	4	3	3	4	5	4	6	5	3	5	4	4	5	5	6	6

Source: Competitive matches
A = Away; H = Home; W = Win; D = Draw; L = Loss

==== Matches ====
25 August 2007 1	Flamurtari Vlorë	1–0	Tirana	Vlorë
	Veliu 89'	Report		Stadium: Flamurtari Stadium

1 September 2007 2	Tirana	2–0	Shkumbini Peqin	Tirana
	Fortuzi 12' (pen.); Sefa 60'	Report		Stadium: Selman Stërmasi Stadium

15 September 2007 3	Skënderbeu Korçë	4–2	Tirana	Korçë
	Ngjela 7', 44', 82'; Tiko 77'	Report	Sefa 4'; Duro 45'	Stadium: Skënderbeu Stadium

=== UEFA Champions League ===
==== First qualifying round ====
18 July 2007 First leg	Domžale (Slovenia)	1–0	(Albania) Tirana	Domžale, Slovenia
20:15	Janković 44'	Report		Stadium: Sports Park; Attendance: 2,000; Referee: Martin Atkinson (England)

25 July 2007 Second leg	Tirana (Albania)	1–2 (1–3 agg.)	(Slovenia) Domžale	Tirana, Albania
20:30	Duro 74'	Report	Ljubijankič 30', 77'	Stadium: Qemal Stafa Stadium; Attendance: 8,000; Referee: Mechalis Germanakos (Greece)
