= 2008 Albanian Cup final =

- Event: 2007–08 Albanian Cup
Vllaznia	Tirana
2	0
- Date: 7 May 2008
- Venue: Ruzhdi Bizhuta Stadium, Elbasan
- Referee: Babak Rafati (Germany)

The 2008 Albanian Cup final was the 56th final of the Albanian Cup. The final was played at Ruzhdi Bizhuta Stadium in Elbasan on 7 May 2008. The match was contested by Vllaznia, who beat Dinamo Tirana in their semi-final, and Tirana who beat Elbasani. Vllaznia opened the scoring in the 3rd minute with midfielder Gilman Lika, they then won the game with a second on 38 minutes through Xhevahir Sukaj to give Vllaznia their sixth Albanian Cup success.

== Match ==
=== Details ===
7 May 2008
16:00

Vllaznia	2–0	Tirana
Lika 3'; Sukaj 38'

Ruzhdi Bizhuta Stadium, Elbasan
Referee: Babak Rafati (Germany)

Vllaznia	KF Tirana

Vllaznia:
GK	(Albania) Armir Grimaj
RB	(Albania) Marenglen Kapaj
CB	(Albania) Admir Teli
CB	(Republic of the Congo) Sasa Delain
LB	(Albania) Safet Osja
CM	(Albania) Suad Liçi (c)
CM	(Albania) Uliks Kotrri
CM	(Albania) Ilir Nallbani	(substituted off) 84'
RM	(Albania) Albert Kaçi
LM	(Albania) Gilman Lika
CF	(Albania) Xhevahir Sukaj
Substitutes:
GK	(Albania) Olti Bishani
DF	(Albania) Arsen Beqiri
DF	(Albania) Elvin Beqiri
MF	(Albania) Edon Hasani
MF	(Albania) Erjon Hoti	(substituted on) 84'
FW	(Sweden) Alban Jusufi
FW	(Albania) Jasmin Rraboshta
Manager:
(Montenegro) Dervis Hadziosmanovic

Tirana:
GK	(Albania) Alfred Osmani (c)
RB	(Albania) Erald Deliallisi
CB	(Croatia) Lek Kcira
CB	(Albania) Elvis Sina	(substituted off) 46'
LB	(Albania) Endrit Vrapi
CM	(Albania) Erbim Fagu
CM	(Albania) Klodian Duro	(substituted off) 46'
RM	(Albania) Jahmir Hyka
LM	(France) Laurent Mohellebi
CF	(Albania) Indrit Fortuzi
CF	(Albania) Daniel Xhafa
Substitutes:
GK	(Albania) Blendi Nallbani
DF	(Albania) Gentian Hajdari	(substituted on) 46'
DF	(North Macedonia) Sašo Gjoreski	(substituted on) 46'
MF	(Albania) Florenc Arapi	(substituted on) 46'
CF	(Kosovo) Berat Hyseni
CF	(Albania) Ergys Sorra
Manager:
(Albania) Sulejman Mema

MATCH RULES

- 90 minutes.
- 30 minutes of extra-time if necessary.
- Penalty shoot-out if scores still level.
- six named substitutes.
- Maximum of three substitutions.
