= Hadžibulić =

Hadžibulić is a surname. Notable people with the surname include:

- Enes Hadžibulić (born 1981), Macedonian basketball player
- Sead Hadžibulić (born 1983), Serbian footballer
- Semir Hadžibulić (born 1986), Serbian-born Bosnia and Herzegovina footballer
