= 2010 Albanian Supercup =

- Event: Albanian Supercup
Besa Kavajë	Dinamo Tirana
3	1
- Date: August 16, 2010
- Venue: Niko Dovana Stadium, Durrës
- Referee: Sokol Jareci
- Attendance: 7,000

The 2010 Albanian Supercup is the 17th edition of the Albanian Supercup since its establishment in 1989. The match was contested between the 2009–10 Albanian Cup winners Besa Kavajë and the 2009–10 Albanian Superliga champions Dinamo Tirana.

Besa Kavajë won 3-1, earning their first Supercup win.

== Details ==
16 August 2010
20:30 CET

Besa Kavajë	3–1	Dinamo Tirana
Poçi 64' (pen.); Dhëmbi 74'; Shtini 85'	Report	El. Bakaj 41'

Niko Dovana Stadium, Durrës
Attendance: 7,000
Referee: Sokol Jareci

BESA KAVAJË:
GK	(Albania) Edvan Bakaj
DF	(Bosnia and Herzegovina) Edin Ferizović
DF	(Albania) Akil Jakupi
DF	(North Macedonia) Dimitrija Lazarevski	Booked
DF	(North Macedonia) Bilal Velija
MF	(Bosnia and Herzegovina) Semir Hadžibulić		(substituted off) 46'
MF	(Albania) Meglid Mihani	Booked
MF	(Albania) Artion Poçi	Booked
MF	(Albania) Paulin Dhëmbi		(substituted off) 90'
FW	(Albania) Sokol Cikalleshi		(substituted off) 80'
FW	(Serbia) Sead Hadžibulić
Substitutes:
MF	(Brazil) Marko dos Santos		(substituted on) 46'
MF	(Albania) Ariel Shtini		(substituted on) 80'
FW	(Albania) Bazion Tragaj		(substituted on) 90'
Manager:
(Albania) Shpëtim Duro

DINAMO TIRANA:
GK	(Albania) Isli Hidi
DF	(Argentina) Lucas Malacarne
DF	(Albania) Roland Peqini	(red card) 30'
DF	(Albania) Arjan Pisha	(yellow card) 80' (yellow-red card)
DF	(Albania) Erjon Xhafa		(substituted off) 77'
MF	(Argentina) Esteban García		(substituted off) 46'
MF	(Albania) Emiljano Vila	Booked
MF	(Albania) Elis Bakaj	Booked
MF	(Albania) Gjergj Muzaka
FW	(Argentina) Rafael Sosa		(substituted off) 46'
FW	(Argentina) Néstor Martinena
Substitutes:
MF	(Albania) Asjon Daja	Booked	(substituted on) 46'
MF	(Albania) Sajmir Gjokeja	Booked	(substituted on) 46'
FW	(Albania) Fatjon Sefa		(substituted on) 77'
Manager:
(Argentina) Luis Manuel Blanco

Match officials:

- Assistant referees:
  - Rejdi Avdo
  - Gerant Qirici

Match rules

- 90 minutes
- 30 minutes extra-time if the scores still level
- Penalty shoot-out if scores still level
- Six named substitutes, of which three may be used

== See also ==
- 2009–10 Albanian Superliga
- 2009–10 Albanian Cup
