= Alban Dragusha =

Kosovar footballer (born 1981)

Personal information
- Date of birth: 11 December 1981 (age 44)
- Place of birth: Prugoc, SFR Yugoslavia
- Height: 1.88 m (6 ft 2 in)
- Position: Centre-back

Team information
- Current team: Prishtina (manager)

Youth career
- 1990–1998: 2 Korriku

Senior career*
Years	Team	Apps	(Gls)
1998–2003	KEK-u		
2003–2004	Kosova Prishtinë		
2004–2005	Vorskla-2 Poltava	5	(0)
2005	Baku	24	(2)
2005–2008	Besa Kavajë	52	(2)
2008–2009	Trepça	21	(0)
2009–2010	Besa Kavajë	26	(2)
2010–2011	Skënderbeu	13	(0)
2011–2012	Kalmar	0	(0)
2012	Besa Kavajë	10	(0)
2012–2015	Vushtrria		
2015–2016	Hajvalia	10	(0)
2016–2017	Drita	23	(1)
2017–2018	Vëllaznimi	18	(1)
Total		+202	(+8)

Managerial career
- 2019: KEK-u
- 2019–2022: Drita (assistant)
- 2022–2023: Vushtrria
- 2023–2026: Ramiz Sadiku
- 2026: Prishtina
- 2026: Ferizaj
- * Club domestic league appearances and goals

Alban Dragusha (born 11 December 1981) is a Kosovar professional football manager and former player who most recently was the manager of Ferizaj.

== Club career ==
Dragusha started his senior career with KEK-u in 1998, progressing from the club's youth system after several years at 2 Korriku. He spent five seasons with KEK-u, establishing himself as a centre-back before moving to Kosova Prishtinë for the 2003–04 season.

In 2004, he moved abroad for the first time, signing with Ukrainian side Vorskla-2 Poltava, where he made five league appearances. The following year, he joined Azerbaijani club Baku, making 24 appearances and scoring two goals during his time there.

Later in 2005, Dragusha transferred to Albanian club Besa Kavajë, where he enjoyed a more extended spell. Between 2005 and 2008, he made 52 appearances and scored two goals, becoming a regular member of the squad. In 2008, he returned to Kosovo to play for Trepça, where he made 21 appearances during the 2008–09 season, following a two-year suspension incurred while at Besa Kavajë after a doping violation, in a 2007–08 UEFA Cup first qualifying round match against Serbian side Bežanija on 19 July 2007.

Dragusha rejoined Besa Kavajë in 2009 for a second spell, making 26 appearances and scoring two goals in the 2009–10 season, when the club won the Albanian Cup. He then signed with Skënderbeu in 2010, where he made 13 appearances.

On 27 January 2011, Dragusha moved to Sweden to join Kalmar, although he did not make any official first-team appearances during his time at the club. In 2012, he returned briefly to Besa Kavajë, making 10 appearances before moving back to Kosovo.

From 2012 to 2015, he played for Vushtrria, followed by shorter spells at Hajvalia (2015–16), where he made 10 appearances, and Drita (2016–17), where he played 23 matches and scored one goal. He concluded his playing career with Vëllaznimi in the 2017–18 season, making 18 appearances and scoring once before retiring.

== Managerial career ==
Dragusha began his managerial career in 2019 with KEK-u. Later that same year, he was appointed assistant manager of Drita, a role he held until 2022. During his time as part of the coaching staff, the club won the Kosovo Superleague in the 2019–20 season.

On 17 June 2022, he was appointed head coach of Vushtrria, leading the team for one season until 2023. He then took over as manager of Ramiz Sadiku, remaining in charge from 2023 to 2026.

On 18 March 2026, Dragusha was appointed manager of Prishtina.

Dragusha left Prishtina at the end of the season and returned to the second tier signing for Ferizaj on 18 June 2026. He was sacked on 4 October 2026.

== Honours ==
Besa Kavajë (as player)

- Albanian Cup: 2009–10

Drita (as assistant)

- Kosovo Superleague: 2019–20
