= Jevđević =

Jevđević (pronounced [jêʋdʑevitɕ]), sometimes written Jevdjević may refer to:

- Dobroslav Jevđević (1895–1962), a Bosnian Serb politician and Chetnik leader
- Miloš Jevđević (born 1973), a Serbian football player
