= Adenis Shala =

Kosovan footballer

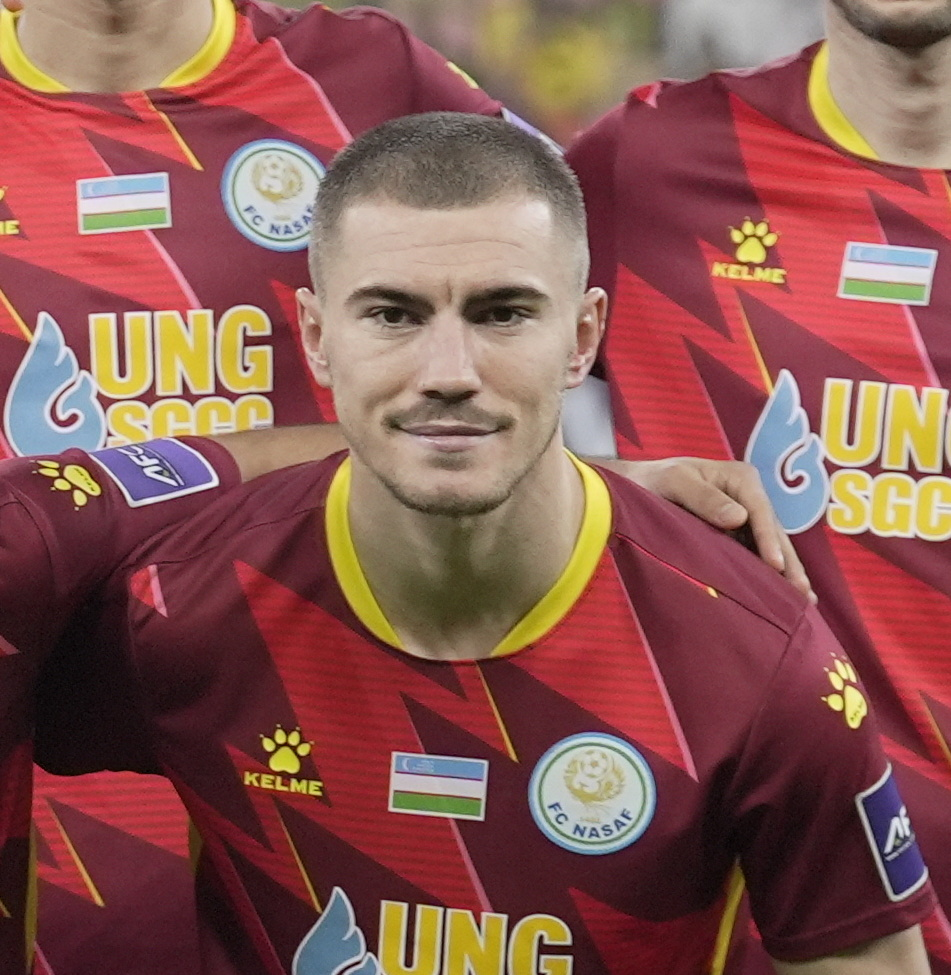
- Shala with Nasaf in 2025

Personal information
- Date of birth: 23 October 1998 (age 28)
- Place of birth: Prugoc, FR Yugoslavia
- Height: 1.71 m (5 ft 7 in)
- Position: Midfielder

Team information
- Current team: Nasaf
- Number: 7

Youth career
- –2017: Flamurtari
- 2017: Hajduk Split
- 2017–2018: Vëllaznimi
- 2018: Fenerbahçe
- 2018–2019: Vorskla Poltava

Senior career*
Years	Team	Apps	(Gls)
2017–2018	Vëllaznimi	3	(1)
2019	Feronikeli	1	(0)
2019–2020	Ferizaj	16	(2)
2020	Gjilani	3	(1)
2020–2021	Trepça'89	26	(5)
2021–2025	Shkëndija	114	(22)
2025–	Nasaf	22	(1)
- * Club domestic league appearances and goals as of 29 July 2026

Adenis Shala (born 23 October 1998) is a Kosovan professional footballer who plays as a midfielder for Uzbekistan Super League club Nasaf.

== Club career ==
=== Early career ===
Shala started his youth career at Flamurtari, where he played until 2017, before joining the youth team of Hajduk Split. He later returned to Kosovo to play for Vëllaznimi that same year, making the transition to senior football and recording three appearances with one goal in the 2017–18 season. Shala also spent time in the youth teams of Fenerbahçe in 2018 and Vorskla Poltava from 2018 to 2019. In January 2019, he signed for Feronikeli, and made one appearance for the club in a match against KEK-u.

He then moved to Ferizaj for the 2019–20 season, there he recorded 16 appearances and scored two goals. In February 2020, he joined Gjilani, making three appearances and scoring one goal. He later signed for Trepça'89, where he made 26 appearances and scored five goals during the 2020–21 season.

=== Shkëndija ===
On 21 August 2021, Shala joined Macedonian First League side Shkëndija, on a one-year deal with an option for a three-year extension. His debut with Shkëndija came seven days later against Pelister after coming on as a substitute in the 46th minute in place of Valmir Nafiu and scoring his side's second goal in a 2–2 away draw.

=== Nasaf ===
On 29 July 2025, Shala signed a one-and-a-half-year contract with Uzbekistan Super League club Nasaf. His debut with Nasaf came nine days later against Andijon after coming on as a substitute in the 66th minute in place of Stefan Čolović.

== International career ==
On 22 May 2017, Shala received a call-up from the Kosovo U21 for a three-day training camp and for an unofficial friendly match against his former club Flamurtari. Fourteen days later, he received another call-up from Kosovo U21 for the UEFA Euro 2019 qualification match against Norway, he was an unused substitute in that match.

On 15 November 2018, Shala received an Albanian passport, which made him eligible to represent Albania at international level. He was subsequently included in the plans of the Albania U21 team and later transferred to the youth team of Ukrainian club Vorskla Poltava, with both processes being mediated by former Albanian international and former Vorskla Poltava player Armend Dallku.

== Honours ==
Feronikeli

- Kosovo Superleague: 2018–19

Shkëndija

- Macedonian First League: 2024–25
