= Meglid Mihani =

Albanian footballer

Personal information
- Full name: Meglid Mihani
- Date of birth: 1 September 1983 (age 43)
- Place of birth: Kavajë, Albania
- Position: Midfielder

Senior career*
Years	Team	Apps	(Gls)
2007–2013	Besa Kavajë	109	(16)
2013–2014	Lushnja	22	(2)
2014–2015	Adriatiku Mamurras	19	(2)
2015	Teuta Durrës	16	(1)
2016	Pogradeci	12	(4)
2016	Korabi	0	(0)
2016–2017	Tomori Berat	18	(1)
2017–2019	Besa Kavajë	41	(5)
- * Club domestic league appearances and goals

Meglid Mihani (born 1 September 1983) is a retired Albanian professional footballer who played as a midfielder.

== Club career ==
=== Early career ===
Mihani begun his career with his boyhood club Besa Kavajë where he played for 6 years, recording more than 100 appearances before switching for Lushnja.

=== Teuta Durrës ===
In July 2015, Migani signed with Teuta Durrës, returning in top flight after one season. He made his debut for the club on 22 August in the opening match of 2015–16 Albanian Superliga, netting the winner at Flamurtari Vlorë for the first three points of the season. He dedicated the goal to coach Gugash Magani after the match. Magani asked the club for his release on 19 January 2016 in order to join Pogradeci; his request was granted.

=== Pogradeci ===
On 19 January 2016, Mihani agreed personal terms and joined Pogradeci in second tier; he signed a contract until the end of the season and was presented on the same day.

=== Korabi Peshkopi ===
In July 2016, Mihani joined newly promoted top flight side Korabi Peshkopi.

=== Tomori Berat ===
In September 2016, Mihani completed a transfer to fellow second tier Tomori Berat by penning a contract running until June 2017.

=== Besa Kavajë ===
On 15 August 2017, Migani signed a contract and returned to his first club Besa Kavajë after four years. Despite a mass exodus at the club during the winter transfer window, Mihani was one of the few players to be confirmed for the second part of the season.

== Honours ==
Besa Kavajë

- Albanian Cup: 2009–10
- Albanian Supercup: 2010
