= Eni Imami =

Albanian footballer

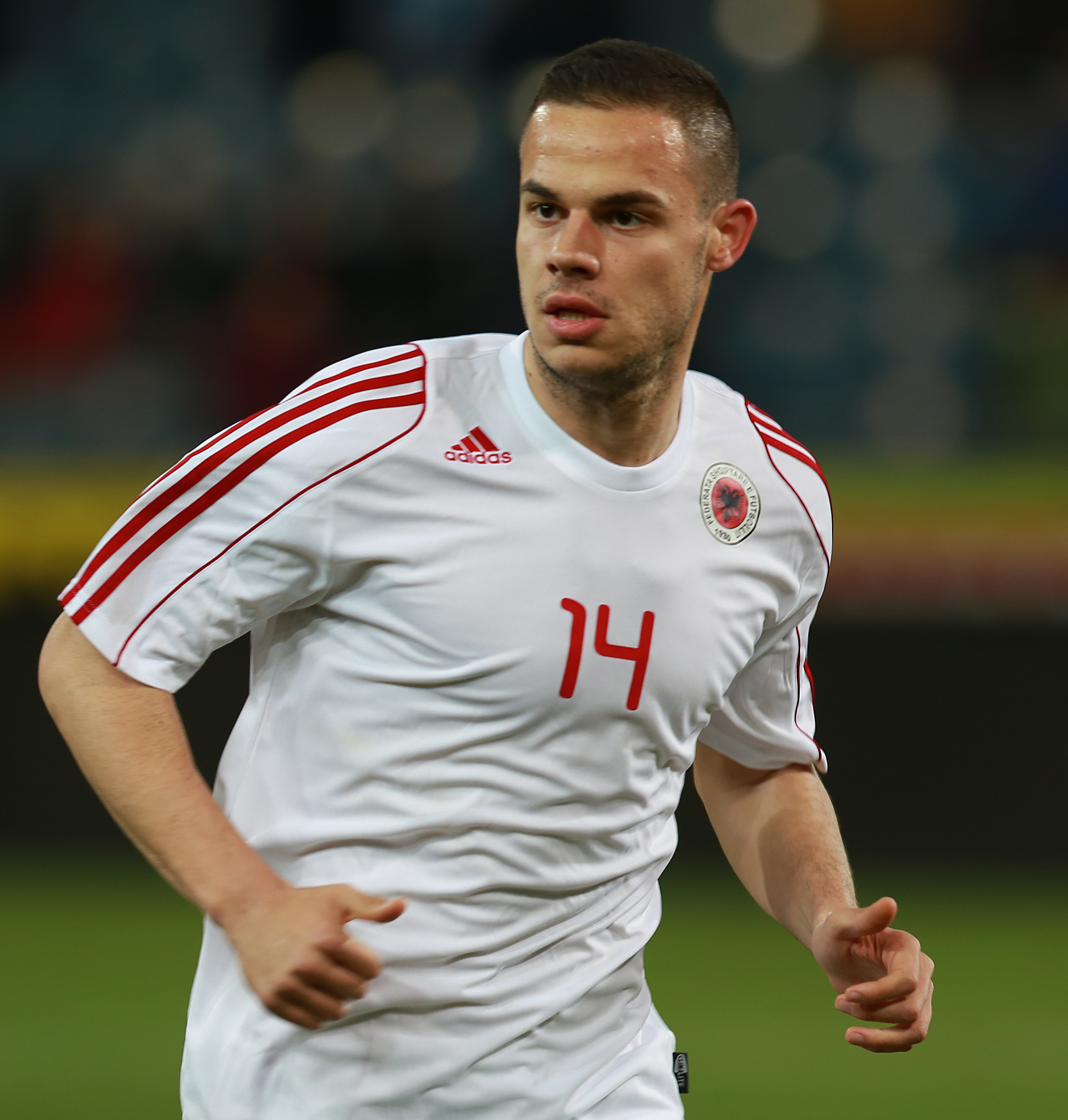
- Imami in 2014

Personal information
- Date of birth: 19 December 1992 (age 33)
- Place of birth: Tirana, Albania
- Height: 1.88 m (6 ft 2 in)
- Position: Midfielder

Youth career
- 2007–2009: Partizani
- 2009–2010: Dinamo Tirana

Senior career*
Years	Team	Apps	(Gls)
2010–2016	Dinamo Tirana	76	(9)
2012–2013	→ Laçi (loan)	1	(0)
2013–2014	→ Biaschesi (loan)	10	(0)
2014	→ Teuta (loan)	1	(0)
2016–2018	Kukësi	56	(0)
2018–2019	Tirana	41	(0)
2020	Skënderbeu Korçë	17	(0)
2020–2021	Vllaznia Shkodër	25	(1)
2021–2023	Dinamo Tirana	44	(2)
2023	Flamurtari	13	(1)
2024–2025	Vora	28	(0)
2025–2026	Kukësi	22	(0)

International career
2008–2009	Albania U17	3	(0)
2009–2011	Albania U19	5	(0)
2012–2014	Albania U21	2	(0)
- * Club domestic league appearances and goals as of 1 June 2024

Eni Imami (born 19 December 1992) is an Albanian professional footballer who plays as a midfielder for Kukësi in Kategoria e Parë .

== Club career ==
=== Dinamo Tirana ===
Imami made his professional debut at 17 years and five months old on 21 April 2010 in a 1–2 home loss to Teuta. With Dinamo already having secured the Kategoria Superiore title for the 18th time in history, Imami got his chance and went on to make three other appearances as substitute, collecting 132 minutes.

=== Biaschesi ===
In June 2013, Imami completed a transfer to 2. Liga Interregional side Biaschesi after successfully passing a one-week trial two months earlier. He played in Swiss' 5th tier in the first part of 2013–14 season, recording ten league appearances before returning in Albania at the end of the year.

=== Teuta ===
Imami signed for Teuta in January 2014 on a short-term contract. Imami would only make on league appearance during his time at Teuta, and it came on 30 April 2014 in a 2–0 away win over Lushnja. He was subbed on for Akil Jakupi at halftime.

=== Kukësi ===
On 21 January 2016, Imami joined Kukësi by penning a three-year contract, worth €500 per month. He made his debut for his new club two days later by playing in the second half of the match against Teuta, valid for the first leg of 2015–16 Albanian Cup quarter-finals, which was lost 1–0. He spent the second part of the 2015–16 season on bench, making only three league appearances, including one as starter, as Kukësi finished as runner-up to Skënderbeu.

He won his first silverware with Kukësi on 22 May 2016, the Albanian Cup, after defeating Laçi on penalty shootouts.

Imami became a regular starter under Ernest Gjoka in the 2016–17 season; he made 22 league appearances, collecting 1868 minutes as Kukësi won their first ever championship by defeating Skënderbeu on controversial fashion in the penultimate matchday. He scored his first goal for Kukësi on 1 February 2017 in the first leg of cup's quarter-final against Tirana. In August 2017, he demanded a wage increase to president Safet Gjici; his request was granted.

Imami played 31 league appearances during the 2017–18 season as Kukësi failed to retain the title. Under manager Mladen Milinković and later Peter Pacult, Imami was used as left-back, centre-back, left midfielder and central midfielder. On 27 May 2018, he was involved in a verbal confrontation with coach Peter Pacult, with the player reportedly asking the coach about his limited playing time.

One day later, Imami left the club after two-and-a-half years after handing a transfer request.

=== Tirana ===
On 29 June 2018, Imami was unveiled as Tirana newest player by signing a two-year contract.

== Career statistics ==
=== Club ===
As of 23 May 2018

Appearances and goals by club, season and competition
Club	Season	League			Cup		Continental		Other		Total	
Club	Season	Division	Apps	Goals	Apps	Goals	Apps	Goals	Apps	Goals	Apps	Goals
Dinamo Tirana	2009–10	Kategoria Superiore	4	0	1	0	—		—		4	0
Dinamo Tirana	2010–11	Kategoria Superiore	3	0	1	0	0	0	1 (Note: Appearance in Kategoria Superiore play-out)	0	5	0
Dinamo Tirana	2011–12	Kategoria Superiore	19	0	1	0	—		—		20	0
Dinamo Tirana	2012–13	Kategoria e Parë	13	3	0	0	—		—		13	3
Dinamo Tirana	Total		39	3	2	0	0	0	1	0	42	3
Laçi (loan)	2012–13	Kategoria Superiore	1	0	2	0	—		—		3	0
Biaschesi	2013–14	2. Liga Interregional	10	0	0	0	—		—		10	0
Teuta	2013–14	Kategoria Superiore	1	0	1	0	—		—		1	0
Dinamo Tirana	2014–15	Kategoria e Parë	25	6	2	0	—		—		27	6
Dinamo Tirana	2015–16	Kategoria e Parë	13	0	0	0	—		—		13	0
Dinamo Tirana	Total		38	6	2	0	—		—		40	6
Kukësi	2015–16	Kategoria Superiore	3	0	1	0	—		—		4	0
Kukësi	2016–17	Kategoria Superiore	22	0	6	1	0	0	—		28	1
Kukësi	2017–18	Kategoria Superiore	31	0	7	0	0	0	0	0	38	0
Kukësi	Total		56	0	14	1	0	0	0	0	70	1
Tirana	2018–19	Kategoria Superiore	0	0	0	0	—		—		0	0
Career total			135	9	20	1	0	0	1	0	156	10

== Honours ==
Dinamo Tirana

- Kategoria Superiore: 2009–10

Kukësi

- Kategoria Superiore: 2016–17
- Albanian Cup: 2015–16
- Albanian Supercup: 2016

Vllaznia

- Albanian Cup: 2020–21

Vora

- Kategoria e Parë: 2024–25
