= Ariel Shtini =

Albanian footballer

Personal information
- Full name: Ariel Durim Shtini
- Date of birth: 7 February 1992 (age 34)
- Place of birth: Kavajë, Albania
- Position: Midfielder

Senior career*
Years	Team	Apps	(Gls)
2009–2011	Besa	32	(6)
2011–2012	Dinamo Tirana	22	(3)
2012	Milsami	0	(0)
Total		54	(9)

International career^{‡}
- Albania U-17
- Albania U-19
- * Club domestic league appearances and goals as of 6 September 2012 ‡ National team caps and goals as of 6 September 2012

Ariel Durim Shtini (born 7 February 1992 in Kavajë) is an Albanian retired footballer who played as a midfielder.

== Club career ==
Shtini started his career with his hometown club Besa Kavajë, and in his first season as a professional he made 10 league appearances, scoring twice, in an eventual second place in 2009–10 season. He also was part of the team that won the Albanian Cup, but did not make any appearance.

He had his breakthrough in the 2010–11 season, first making his European debut in July, winning the Albanian Supercup one month later against Dinamo Tirana where he entered in the last ten minutes and scored the third goal. Shtini also played 22 league matches as Besa couldn't repeat the success of last season, finishing in the 11th position which resulted in them being relegated.

For the 2011–12 he joined Dinamo Tirana where he cemented his place in the starting lineup. However, the capital club's problems in and off the field resulted in them finishing in the last position and relegated to First Division. Shtini had a good individual season, making 22 league appearances and scoring three times, being the joint-second topscorer of the team.

=== Moldova and career-ending injury ===
On 30 June 2012, after successfully passing the trial, Shtini joined Moldovan club Milsami on a two-year contract, and was presented on the same day. After playing in some friendlies, he suffered a major injury by breaking the bone of his right leg, which required surgery. He was forced to cut a part of his bone, which made him unable to continue his football career, thus retiring at the age of 20.

== International career ==
Shtini has represented Albania at under-17 and under-19 levels.

== Honours ==
Besa Kavajë

- Albanian Superliga runner-up: 2009–10
- Albanian Cup: 2009–10
- Albanian Supercup: 2010
