= Erald Elmazi =

Albanian football player

Personal information
- Full name: Erald Elmazi
- Date of birth: 18 March 1988 (age 38)
- Place of birth: Albania
- Position: Defender

Senior career*
Years	Team	Apps	(Gls)
2007–2010	Apolonia		
2010	Lushnja		
2011	Vlora		
2011–2012	Himara		
- * Club domestic league appearances and goals

Erald Elmazi (born 18 March 1988) is an Albanian football player, who most recently played as a defender for KF Himara.
