= Klajdi Kuka =

Albanian footballer

Personal information
- Date of birth: 29 March 1990 (age 36)
- Place of birth: Tirana, Albania
- Height: 1.91 m (6 ft 3 in)
- Position: Goalkeeper

Team information
- Current team: Tirana
- Number: 12

Youth career
- 2005–2007: Tirana

Senior career*
Years	Team	Apps	(Gls)
2007–2012	Tirana	1	(0)
2010	→ Tomori (loan)	15	(0)
2011	→ Bylis (loan)	23	(0)
2011	→ Tomori (loan)	4	(0)
2012–2013	Tërbuni	21	(0)
2013	Tomori	15	(0)
2014–2015	Sportfreunde Düren	40	(0)
2014–2015	Sportfreunde Düren II	1	(0)
2016–2017	Tërbuni	36	(1)
2017–2018	Kastrioti	41	(0)
2019	Vora	10	(0)
2019	Turbina	9	(0)
2020	Dinamo Tirana	13	(0)
2020–2021	Besa Kavajë	12	(0)
2021–2022	Tërbuni	27	(0)
2022–2023	Laçi	0	(0)
2023	→ Flamurtari (loan)	15	(0)
2023–2024	Elbasani	6	(0)
2024–2026	Egnatia	0	(0)
2026–	Tirana	0	(0)
- * Club domestic league appearances and goals as of 19:25, 20 November 2023 (UTC)

Klajdi Kuka (born 29 March 1990) is an Albanian professional footballer who plays as a goalkeeper for Tirana.

== Career ==
Kuka made his debut for KF Tirana at the age of 18 on the last day of the 2007–08 season against Kastrioti Krujë. Failing to break through into the first team he was loaned out to Albanian First Division side Tomori Berat in January 2010 for 12 months.

He then again moved on loan to Bylis Balsh in the Albanian Superliga in February 2011 until the remainder of the season. Once he returned to Tirana he was again loaned out to Tomori Berat on 29 August 2011 for the entire 2011–12 season, but he returned to his parent club early on 10 January 2012.

Kuka scored his professional goal on 14 May 2016 in Tërbuni Pukë's 2–1 home loss to Kukësi, netting from his own zone with a long kick which downfielded deceived Enea Koliçi.

In July 2017, Kuka completed a transfer to Kastrioti Krujë in the Albanian First Division for the 2017–18 season. On 1 August 2018, he signed a new one-year contract ahead of the 2018–19 season. Later on 24 December, the club announced the termination of the contract with the goalkeeper by mutual consent.

In January 2019, Kuka returned in First Division by joining FK Vora on a six-month deal.

On 5 July 2022, Laçi announced to have signed Kuka on a deal for the 2022–23 season.

== Personal life ==
Kuka is a longlife fan of KF Tirana, the club in which he started his career.
