= Mateus Lima =

Brazilian footballer (born 1993)

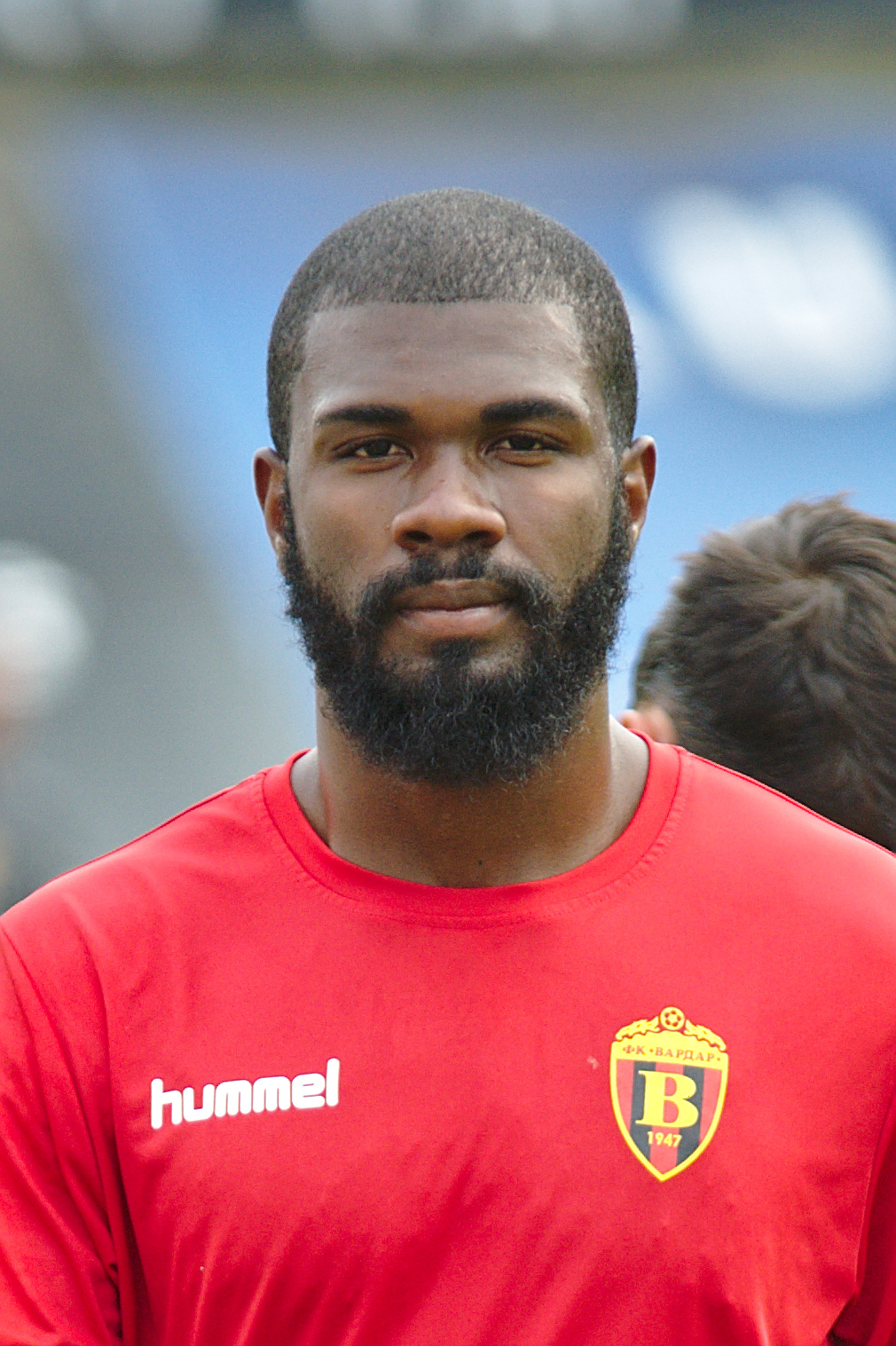

Personal information
- Full name: Mateus Lima Cruz
- Date of birth: 18 January 1993 (age 33)
- Place of birth: Iturama, Brazil
- Height: 1.87 m (6 ft 2 in)
- Position: Forward

Team information
- Current team: Nakhon Ratchasima
- Number: 11

Youth career
- 2008–2012: Grêmio Barueri

Senior career*
Years	Team	Apps	(Gls)
2012–2013	Grêmio Barueri	5	(0)
2012	→ Sport Barueri (loan)	0	(0)
2013	Sport Recife	5	(2)
2014	Guarani	0	(0)
2014	Luverdense	4	(2)
2015	Operário Ferroviário	3	(1)
2015–2016	Kukësi	27	(7)
2016–2017	Santos	0	(0)
2017–2018	Borac Čačak	30	(8)
2018–2020	Slaven Belupo	51	(7)
2020–2021	Hapoel Nof HaGalil	29	(9)
2021–2022	Hapoel Rishon LeZion	34	(7)
2022–2023	Nasaf	34	(6)
2024	Ratchaburi	12	(5)
2024	Sukhothai	13	(1)
2025	Guangxi Pingguo Haliao	15	(5)
2026–	Nakhon Ratchasima F.C.	0	(0)
- * Club domestic league appearances and goals as of 5 July 2025

Mateus Lima Cruz (born 18 January 1993), known as Mateus, is a Brazilian footballer who plays as a forward for Thai League 1 side Nakhon Ratchasima.

== Club career ==
Born in Iturama, Minas Gerais, Mateus Lima was a Grêmio Barueri youth graduate. After a short loan spell at Sport Barueri, he made his professional debut on 17 November 2012, starting in a 2–0 home win against Avaí for the Série B championship.

On 4 February 2013, Mateus Lima moved to Sport Recife. After only appearing for the club in the Campeonato Pernambucano, he joined Guarani on 10 December.

On 16 January 2014, Mateus Lima signed for Luverdense. He scored his first professional goal on 19 November, but in a 1–2 home loss against América Mineiro; he added another ten days later, netting the game's only in a home success over Ceará.

On 20 February 2015, Mateus Lima agreed to a contract with Operário Ferroviário. He was crowned champions of the year's Campeonato Paranaense, but appeared rarely.

In June 2015, Mateus Lima signed with Albanian Champions Skënderbeu Korçë as a reinforcement for the club's campaign in Champions League after the departures of Aco Stojkov, Dhiego Martins and Fatjon Sefa. The Brazilian striker was also a target of FK Kukësi. In his unofficial debut on 16 June, Lima scored in his debut after 29 minutes in an eventual 2–1 win against Romanian side. Despite scoring in his debut, however, he was not named in Skënderbeu's squad list for the first qualifying round of the UEFA Champions League because he did not convince his coach Mirel Josa in his appearances.

In July 2015, after just one month with Skënderbeu Korçë, Mateus Lima left the club and signed with Kukesi. In the 2015–16 campaign, he scored seven league goals in 27 league appearances, along with three goals in the Albanian Cup.

In July 2016, Mateus Lima joined Santos, and was assigned to the B-team squad.

On the last day of the summer transfer window 2017, Mateus Lima signed with the Serbian SuperLiga side Borac Čačak.

In the summer of 2018, Mateus Lima signed a two-year contract with the Croatian First Football League side Slaven Belupo.

On 17 August 2020 he signed with Hapoel Nof HaGalil.

== Career statistics ==
As of match played 5 July 2025

Appearances and goals by club, season and competition
Club	Season	League			State League		Cup		League Cup		Continental		Other		Total	
Club	Season	Division	Apps	Goals	Apps	Goals	Apps	Goals	Apps	Goals	Apps	Goals	Apps	Goals	Apps	Goals
Grêmio Barueri	2012	Série B	2	0	0	0	—		—		—		—		2	0
Grêmio Barueri	2013	Série C	0	0	3	0	—		—		—		—		3	0
Grêmio Barueri	Total		2	0	3	0	—		—		—		—		5	0
Sport Barueri (loan)	2012	Paulista Série B	—		27	7	—		—		—		—		27	7
Sport	2013	Série B	0	0	10	3	3	0	—		—		—		13	3
Guarani	2014	Série C	0	0	0	0	0	0	—		—		—		0	0
Luverdense	2014	Série B	4	2	11	3	—		—		—		—		15	5
Operário Ferroviário	2015	Série D	0	0	3	1	—		—		—		—		3	1
Kukësi	2015–16	Albanian Superliga	27	7	—		4	3	—		—		—		31	10
Santos	2016	Série A	0	0	—		0	0	—		—		6 (Note: Appearance(s) in Copa Paulista)	0	6	0
Borac Čačak	2017–18	Serbian SuperLiga	30	8	—		2	0	—		—		—		32	8
Slaven Belupo	2018–19	Croatian First Football League	21	5	—		2	0	—		—		—		23	5
Slaven Belupo	2019–20	Croatian First Football League	30	2	—		4	0	—		—		—		34	2
Slaven Belupo	Total		51	7	—		6	0	—		—		—		57	7
Hapoel Nof HaGalil	2020–21	Liga Leumit	29	9	—		1	0	4	0	—		—		34	9
Hapoel Rishon LeZion	2021–22	Liga Leumit	34	7	—		1	0	—		—		1	0	36	7
Nasaf	2022	Uzbekistan Super League	13	2	—		3	1	—		—		—		16	3
Nasaf	2023	Uzbekistan Super League	21	4	—		6	1	—		5	1	1	0	33	6
Nasaf	Total		34	6	—		9	2	—		5	1	1	0	49	6
Ratchaburi	2023–24	Thai League 1	12	5	—		—		2	0	—		—		14	5
Sukhothai	2024–25	Thai League 1	13	1	—		1	0	1	0	—		—		15	1
Guangxi Pingguo	2025	China League One	15	5	—		1	0	—		—		—		16	5
Total			251	57	54	14	22	5	7	0	5	1	8	0	353	74

== Honours ==
Operário Ferroviário

- Campeonato Paranaense: 2015
