= Márcio Pit =

Brazilian footballer

Personal information
- Full name: Marcio Borges dos Santos
- Date of birth: 10 May 1989 (age 37)
- Place of birth: Floriano, Piauí, Brazil
- Height: 1.60 m (5 ft 3 in)
- Position: Left-back

Senior career*
Years	Team	Apps	(Gls)
2011	Santa Helena	7	(0)
2012	CRAC	16	(0)
2012	Barretos		
2012–2013	Grêmio Barueri	26	(0)
2013–2014	Paulista	7	(0)
2014	São Carlos	6	(0)
2014	CA Juventus		
2015	Kukësi	14	(2)
- * Club domestic league appearances and goals

Márcio Borges dos Santos (born 10 May 1989), commonly known as Márcio Pit, is a Brazilian former footballer who played as a left-back.
