= Resul Kastrati =

Albanian footballer

Personal information
- Full name: Resul Selim Kastrati
- Date of birth: 20 March 1994 (age 32)
- Place of birth: Has, Albania
- Height: 1.75 m (5 ft 9 in)
- Position: Centre back

Youth career
- –2013: Teuta

Senior career*
Years	Team	Apps	(Gls)
2013–2016	Teuta	12	(1)
2016	→ Kukësi (loan)	1	(0)
- * Club domestic league appearances and goals

Resul Selim Kastrati (born 20 March 1994) is an Albanian former professional footballer who played as a defender. He played for Teuta and Kukësi in the Kategoria Superiore.

== Club career ==
=== Teuta ===
Kastrati developed in the youth system of Teuta, progressing to the club's first team in 2013. He also featured for Teuta's under-19 team, playing alongside his younger brother Elhan Kastrati in a 2–0 win against Skënderbeu on 17 March 2013. He made senior appearances for Teuta between 2013 and 2016.

=== Kukësi ===
In February 2016, Kastrati joined Kukësi on loan from Teuta for the remainder of the season. He made appearances for the club in the second-half of the 2015–16 Kategoria Superiore.

== Personal life ==
Kastrati is the older brother of fellow footballer Elhan Kastrati. He later left football to focus on his family's businesses.
