= Mario Mijatović =

Croatian footballer (born 1980)

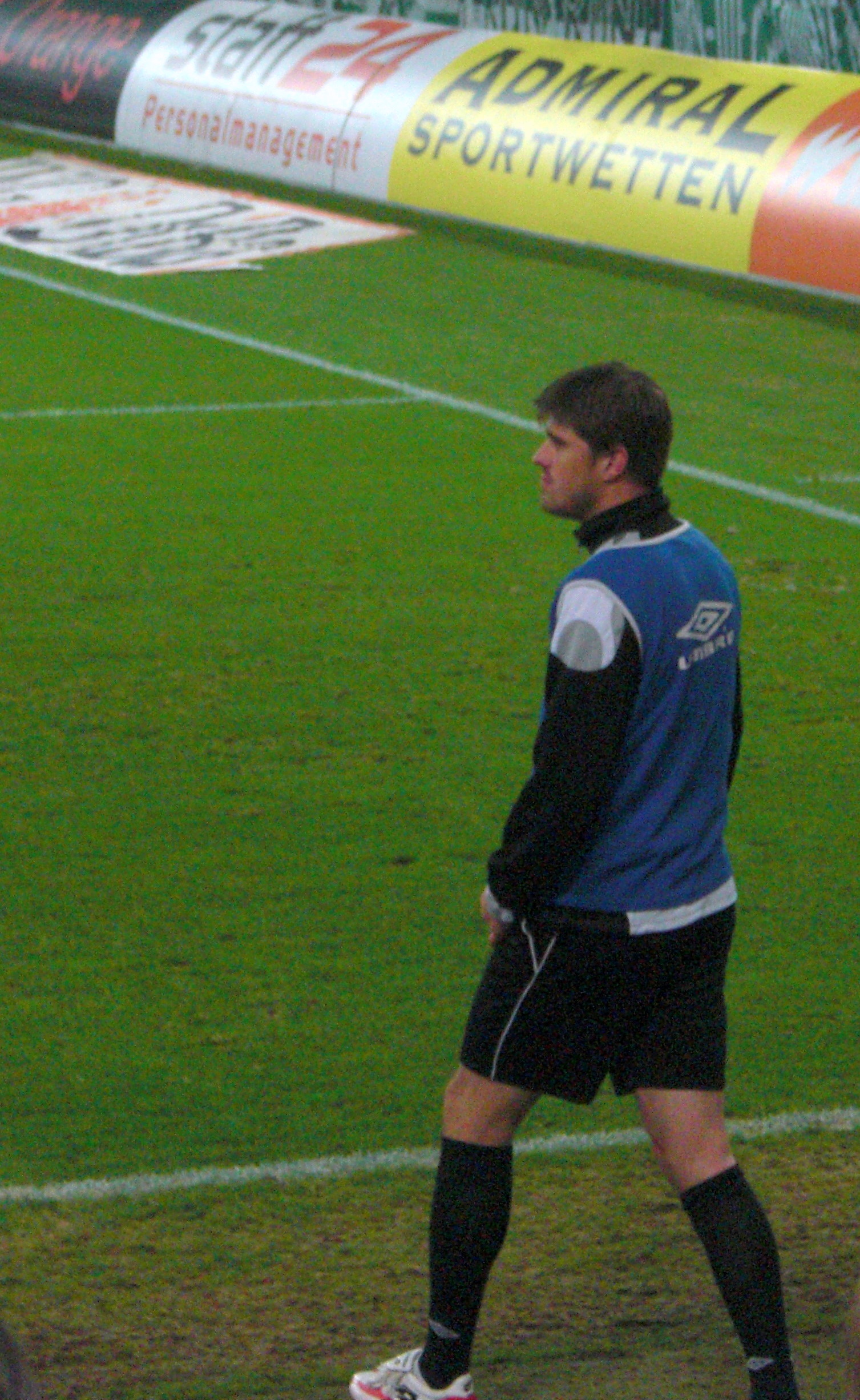
- Mijatović with LASK

Personal information
- Date of birth: 24 October 1980 (age 46)
- Place of birth: Draž, SR Croatia, SFR Yugoslavia
- Height: 1.92 m (6 ft 4 in)
- Position: Midfielder

Youth career
- Osijek

Senior career*
Years	Team	Apps	(Gls)
1999–2002	Osijek	11	(1)
2002–2003	Grafičar		
2003	Belišće		
2004	Slaven Belupo		
2005	Kamen Ingrad	11	(0)
2006	Kottingbrunn		
2006-2009	LASK	54+	(11+)
2009	FC Lustenau	13	(4)
2010-2011	Hoang Anh Gia Lai		
2011-2012	Steel Azin		
2012	Kavala	4	(0)
2013	Olimpija Osijek		
2013-2014	NAŠK		
2015	Balmazújvárosi	10	(2)
2015	Grafičar		
2016	Kukësi	1	(0)
2016	Belišće		
- * Club domestic league appearances and goals

Mario Mijatović (born 24 October 1980) is a Croatian retired professional footballer who played as a forward.

== Career ==
He had spells in Austria with Kottingbrunn, LASK and FC Lustenau.
