= Lapidar Lladrovci =

Kosovar footballer

Personal information
- Full name: Lapidar Lladrovci
- Date of birth: 15 December 1990 (age 35)
- Place of birth: Glogovac, SFR Yugoslavia
- Height: 1.87 m (6 ft 2 in)
- Position: Centre-back

Youth career
- –2011: Drenica

Senior career*
| Years | Team | Apps | (Gls) |
| 2011–2013 | Drenica | | |
| 2013–2015 | Feronikeli | | |
| 2015–2016 | Tirana | 9 | (0) |
| 2015 | → Feronikeli (loan) | 5 | (0) |
| 2016 | Kukësi | 14 | (0) |
| 2017–2018 | Trepça'89 | 15 | (1) |
| 2018–2022 | Feronikeli | 95 | (5) |
| 2022 | Drenasi | | |
| 2022–2025 | Feronikeli | 34 | (0) |

International career
| 2020 | Kosovo | 1 | (0) |
- * Club domestic league appearances and goals

Lapidar Lladrovci (born 15 December 1990) is a Kosovan former professional footballer who played as a midfielder. He spend the majority of his career in Kosovo, most notably with Feronikeli, which he captained.

== Club career ==
In January 2015, Lladrovci went to a trial with Albanian Superliga club Tirana which he successfully passed and signed a pre-contract, but was sent on loan at his previous club Feronikeli until the end of the season.

On 1 February 2016, Lladrovci joined fellow Albanian Superliga side as a free transfer.

Lladrovci announced his retirement at the end of 2024–25 season, having played only 11 league matches with Feronikeli.

== International career ==
Lladrovci made his international debut for Kosovo on 12 January 2020 in a friendly match against Sweden, which finished as a 0–1 loss.

== Honours ==
Kukësi

- Albanian Cup: 2015–16

Feronikeli

- Kosovar Superleague: 2018–19
- First League of Kosovo: 2022–23

== Personal life ==
He is the son of the current Kosovar ambassador to Albania Ramiz Lladrovci.
