= Williams Recife =

Brazilian footballer (born 1986)

Personal information
- Full name: Williams Gomes Vital da Silva
- Date of birth: 29 June 1986 (age 40)
- Place of birth: Brazil
- Position: Forward

Team information
- Current team: AD Jaguar

Senior career*
Years	Team	Apps	(Gls)
2013–2014	Nova Esperança		
2014–2015	Corumbaense		
2016	Kukësi	2	(0)
2016	Campinense		
2017	Auto Esporte		
2022–2023	União AC		
2023–	AD Jaguar		
- * Club domestic league appearances and goals

Williams Gomes Vital da Silva (born 29 June 1986), commonly known as Williams Recife, is a Brazilian footballer who plays as a forward for AD Jaguar.
