= Birungueta =

Brazilian footballer (born 1993)

Personal information
- Full name: João Emanuel Ferreira Souza
- Date of birth: 17 August 1993 (age 33)
- Place of birth: Brazil
- Position: Midfielder

Team information
- Current team: Treze

Senior career*
Years	Team	Apps	(Gls)
2011–2014	Treze	54	(4)
2012	→ Itapipoca (loan)	9	(1)
2014–2015	Linense	6	(0)
2015–2016	FK Kukësi	15	(0)
2017	Bahia de Feira	4	(0)
2017	Sousa	8	(1)
2018	Jacuipense	11	(1)
2019	Nacional de Patos		
2020	Perilima		
2020	Itabaiana	15	(4)
2021–	Treze	0	(0)
- * Club domestic league appearances and goals as of 20:46, 19 February 2021 (UTC)

João Emanuel Ferreira Souza (born 17 August 1993), commonly known as Birungueta, is a Brazilian footballer who currently plays as a midfielder for Treze.
