= Sead Hadžibulić =

Serbian footballer

Personal information
- Full name: Sead Hadžibulić
- Date of birth: 30 January 1983 (age 43)
- Place of birth: Novi Pazar, SFR Yugoslavia
- Height: 1.90 m (6 ft 3 in)
- Position: Forward

Senior career*
Years	Team	Apps	(Gls)
2001–2005	Jošanica		
2005	→ Zvižd (loan)	9	(0)
2005–2007	Novi Pazar	60	(8)
2007–2008	Gloria Bistrița	19	(1)
2008	Javor Ivanjica	10	(0)
2009	Apolonia Fier	30	(10)
2010	Vllaznia Shkodër	13	(1)
2010	Besa Kavajë	9	(0)
2011	Javor Ivanjica	15	(5)
2011–2012	Hajduk Kula	23	(2)
2012–2013	Tampines Rovers	24	(11)
2013	Jagodina	0	(0)
2013–2014	Radnički Niš	14	(2)
2014	Novi Pazar	11	(1)
2015	Koper	5	(1)
2015	Naxxar Lions	5	(0)
2016	Travnik	3	(0)
2016–2017	Iskra Danilovgrad	2	(0)
2017	Novi Pazar	0	(0)
- * Club domestic league appearances and goals as of 5 October 2017

Sead Hadžibulić (Serbian Cyrillic: Сеад Хаџибулић; born 30 January 1983) is a Serbian retired football forward.

== Club career ==
After beginning his career by playing in his home town clubs FK Jošanica and FK Novi Pazar with short loan spell with FK Zvižd. In summer 2007 he moved to Romania where he played the 2007–08 season with Liga I side Gloria Bistrița. Next summer he was back in Serbia ready to make a debut in the Serbian SuperLiga with the newly promoted side FK Javor Ivanjica. However fierce competition in the squad made him want to search for a place where he could get more chances, choosing to move abroad again, this time to Albanian Superliga side FK Apolonia Fier where he played until the winter break of the 2009–10 season. Another Albanian top flight side brought him that winter, KF Vllaznia Shkodër having reached to become runners-up of the 2009–10 Albanian Cup that season. Curiously, that summer he will move precisely to the team that had won them at that Cup final, KF Besa Kavajë who had just won the domestic Supercup title as well. However, the next season was not as successful as the previous one for Besa, and Hadžibulić left the team at the following winter break.

After having played for 2 years in Albanian top flight clubs, Hadžibulić returned to Serbia during the winter break of the 2010–11 season signing with his former club FK Javor Ivanjica. This time he became a regular in the squad and, after only 6 months, his good performances earned him a move to a more ambitious SuperLiga side FK Hajduk Kula.

=== Tampines Rovers ===
In June 2012, Hadžibulić joined the Tampines Rovers in Singapore. Over the course of one season, he scored 11 goals in 24 league games.

=== Jagodina ===
On 23 June 2013 Hadžibulić signed for FK Jagodina. After matches in Europa League Qualifiers, he left to Radnički Niš.

== Honours ==
Besa Kavajë

- Albanian Supercup: 2010

Tampines Rovers

- S.League: 2012, 2013

Koper

- Slovenian Cup: 2015
