= Semir Hadžibulić =

Serbian-born Bosniak football player (born 1986)

Personal information
- Date of birth: 16 August 1986 (age 40)
- Place of birth: Novi Pazar, SR Serbia, SFR Yugoslavia
- Height: 1.79 m (5 ft 10 in)
- Position: Attacking midfielder

Youth career
- Novi Pazar

Senior career*
Years	Team	Apps	(Gls)
2003–2005	Novi Pazar	66	(2)
2004	→ Jošanica (loan)	10	(2)
2005–2007	BASK	23	(0)
2007	→ Novi Pazar (loan)	11	(1)
2007	Napredak Kruševac	0	(0)
2008	Shkëndija	9	(1)
2008–2010	Apolonia Fier	42	(4)
2010	Gramozi	11	(1)
2010	Besa Kavajë	14	(0)
2011	Dinamo Tbilisi	8	(1)
2011–2013	Novi Pazar	25	(1)
2013	Doxa Katokopias	13	(0)
2013–2014	Čelik Nikšić	24	(0)
2014	Al Tadhamon	9	(0)
2015	Mladost Velika Obarska	13	(0)
2015	Vllaznia Shkodër	14	(0)
2016–2019	KÍ Klaksvík	70	(9)
2019	Gjilani	4	(0)
2019	KÍ Klaksvík	10	(1)
2020–2021	Novi Pazar	30	(3)
Total		406	(26)
- * Club domestic league appearances and goals

Semir Hadžibulić (Serbian Cyrillic: Семир Хаџибулић; born 16 August 1986) is a Serbian-born Bosniak former football player.

== Career ==
His career started in his home town club FK Novi Pazar. He moved in 2005 to the historical Belgrade club FK BASK. His major achievement was to sign for the Serbian SuperLiga club FK Napredak Kruševac in 2007. In January 2008, he moved to Macedonian First Football League club KF Shkëndija. After six months there, in summer 2008, he moved to Albanian Superliga club FK Apolonia Fier. In July 2010 he signed for KF Besa Kavajë in Albanian Superliga for a fee of €136,000. Early in 2011 he signed to FC Dinamo Tbilisi in Georgian Umaglesi Liga. In summer 2011 he moved back to FK Novi Pazar and played in Serbian SuperLiga. In January 2016 he signed for KI Klaksvik.

After two years in the Faroe Islands, Hadžibulić joined SC Gjilani in the Football Superleague of Kosovo on 8 January 2019. On 12 June 2019, KÍ Klaksvík announced that Hadžibulić had returned to the club.

== Honours ==
Besa Kavajë

- Albanian Supercup: 2010

KI Klaksvik

- Faroe Islands Premier League: 2019
- Faroe Islands Cup: 2016
