= Erald Deliallisi =

Albanian footballer

Personal information
- Date of birth: 12 March 1982 (age 44)
- Place of birth: Tirana, Albania
- Height: 1.83 m (6 ft 0 in)
- Position: Central midfielder

Youth career
- 1998–2001: Lushnja

Senior career*
Years	Team	Apps	(Gls)
2001–2003	Lushnja		
2003–2007	Dinamo Tirana	33+	(1)
2007–2009	Tirana	33	(1)
2009–2010	Teuta	31	(0)
2010–2011	Kamza	10+	(0+)
2011–2012	Dinamo Tirana	20	(0)

International career
2003	Albania U21	2	(0)
- * Club domestic league appearances and goals

Erald Deliallisi (born 12 March 1982) is an Albanian former footballer.
