= Erand Hoxha =

Albanian footballer

Personal information
- Date of birth: 25 April 1985 (age 41)
- Place of birth: Kavajë, Albania
- Position: Defender

Senior career*
Years	Team	Apps	(Gls)
2009–2010	Besa	11	(0)
2010–2011	Elbasani	1	(0)
2010–2014	Besa	68	(2)
2014–2017	Teuta	57	(1)
2017	Besa	10	(0)
2018–2019	Korabi	25	(5)
- * Club domestic league appearances and goals

Erand Hoxha (born 25 April 1985) is an Albanian former football player who played as a defender.

== Honours ==
Besa Kavajë

- Albanian Cup (1): 2009–10
