= Devis Mema =

Albanian footballer

Personal information
- Full name: Devis Mema
- Date of birth: 13 February 1985 (age 41)
- Place of birth: Korçë, Albania
- Position: Striker

Youth career
- 2000–2003: Partizani Tirana

Senior career*
Years	Team	Apps	(Gls)
2003–2004	Partizani Tirana	0	(0)
2004–2006	Skënderbeu Korçë	10	(0)
2006–2007	Apolonia Fier	21	(3)
2007–2010	Flamurtari Vlorë	70	(15)
2010	Tomori Berat	?	(?)

International career
2004–2006	Albania U21	2	(0)
- * Club domestic league appearances and goals as of 19 May 2010

Devis Mema (born 13 February 1985) is an Albanian football manager and former footballer who last played for Tomori Berat in the Albanian First Division. As of 2019, he was the coach of KF Maliqi.

== Career ==
Mema was born in Korçë but started off his playing career with Partizani Tirana in 2003. He then moved to play for the team of his birthplace, Skënderbeu Korçë. At this club he spent a year and a half after joining in the summer of 2004 and leaving in January 2006 to join Apolonia Fier. He played in Fier for a season and a half and left to join Flamurtari Vlorë in the summer of 2007.

=== Flamurtari Vlorë ===
Following his move to the Vlorë club in 2007, Mema has been able to quickly established himself in the first team. He made his debut for the club on the opening day of the season on 25 August 2007 in a home match against KF Tirana. Mema started the game up front with Arlind Rustemi but was substituted in the 70th minute for the player who proved to be the match winner, Franc Veliu.

During the 2007–08 season he played a total of 29 league games and became the club's top goalscorer for the season with 9 goals. During the 2008–09 campaign Mema struggled compared to his first season with the club due to injuries and the arrival of fellow Elham Galica and Eleandro Pema. He managed to play just 17 games and scored only 2 goals in the league.

Mema helped KS Flamurtari to victory over KF Tirana in the final of the 2008 Albanian Cup. Mema's equaliser came in the 65th minute and was followed by Hair Zeqiri's goal in injury time.

== Honours ==
=== Club ===
- Albanian Cup (1): 2008–09
- Kupa Pavarësia (1): 2009
- Kupa Mbarëkombëtare (1): 2009
