= Arlind Nora =

Albanian footballer (born 1980))

Personal information
- Full name: Arlind Nora
- Date of birth: 4 July 1980 (age 46)
- Place of birth: Gjirokastër, Albania
- Height: 1.81 m (5 ft 11 in)
- Position: Forward

Youth career
- 1995–1997: Luftëtari

Senior career*
Years	Team	Apps	(Gls)
1997–2002	Luftëtari	112	(12)
2003–2005	Lushnja	74	(23)
2005–2006	Elbasani	25	(1)
2006–2007	Luftëtari	24	(6)
2007–2008	Vllaznia	16	(1)
2008–2009	Shkumbini	39	(10)
2009–2010	KF Laçi	30	(14)
2010–2011	Shkumbini	14	(3)
2011–2012	Besa Kavajë	13	(5)
2012–2014	Luftëtari	64	(33)
- * Club domestic league appearances and goals as of 29 June 2015

Arlind Nora (born 4 July 1980 in Gjirokastër) is a retired Albanian footballer playing as a forward.

== Career stats ==
Years	Club	Country	Matches	Goals
1997–02	Luftëtari Gjirokastër	Albania	112	12
2003–05	KF Lushnja	Albania	74	23
2005–06	KF Elbasani	Albania	25	1
2006–07	Luftëtari Gjirokastër	Albania	24	6
2007	Vllaznia Shkodër	Albania	16	1
2008–09	Shkumbini Peqin	Albania	39	10
2009–10	KF Laçi	Albania	30	14
2010	Shkumbini Peqin	Albania	14	3
2011	Besa Kavajë	Albania	13	5
2011–14	Luftëtari Gjirokastër	Albania	64	33

== Honours ==
=== Club ===
Elbasani

- Albanian Superliga (1): 2005–06
