= Miloš Jevđević =

Serbian footballer

Personal information
- Full name: Miloš Jevđević
- Date of birth: January 11, 1981 (age 45)
- Place of birth: Jagodina, SFR Yugoslavia
- Height: 1.84 m (6 ft 0 in)
- Position: Central midfielder

Senior career*
Years	Team	Apps	(Gls)
1999–2001	Bor		
2001–2003	Javor Ivanjica	31	(4)
2003–2005	Timok	17	(1)
2003–2004	→ Radnički Niš (loan)	9	(0)
2004–2005	→ Napredak Kruševac (loan)	11	(0)
2005–2006	Mladenovac	3	(0)
2006	Sevojno	20	(0)
2007	Grbalj	9	(0)
2007–2008	Novi Pazar	5	(0)
2008–2010	Inđija	4	(0)
2010–2011	Apolonia Fier	13	(0)
2011–2013	Kukësi	31	(8)
2013	Tërbuni Pukë	20	(4)
- * Club domestic league appearances and goals as of May 25, 2015

Miloš Jevđević (Serbian Cyrillic: Милош Jeвђeвић; born 11 January 1981) is a Serbian retired footballer.

== Career ==
Before coming to Fier, he played mostly in the Serbian Second League, being the only exceptions the last season with FK Javor Ivanjica that he played in 2002-03 in the First League of Serbia and Montenegro, and the first six months of 2007, that he spend with OFK Grbalj in the Montenegrin First League. Beside Javor, FK Timok, FK Radnički Niš, FK Napredak Kruševac, OFK Mladenovac, FK Sevojno, FK Novi Pazar and FK Inđija, are the other clubs in Serbia where he played.
