= Edin Ferizović =

Serbian footballer

Personal information
- Full name: Edin Ferizović
- Date of birth: 12 October 1977 (age 49)
- Place of birth: Novi Pazar, SR Serbia, SFR Yugoslavia
- Height: 1.82 m (5 ft 11 1/2 in)
- Position: Defender

Team information
- Current team: Jošanica

Senior career*
Years	Team	Apps	(Gls)
2001–2002	Novi Pazar	11	(1)
2003	Belasica		
2004–2007	Novi Pazar	87	(8)
2006	→ OFK Niš (loan)	10	(0)
2007–2008	ČSK Čelarevo	13	(1)
2008	→ Novi Pazar (loan)	12	(1)
2008	Novi Pazar	15	(3)
2009	Apolonia Fier	15	(1)
2010	Shkumbini Peqin	14	(0)
2010	Besa Kavajë	14	(0)
2011–2013	Novi Pazar	1	(0)
2012–2013	→ Sinđelić Niš (loan)	33	(1)
2013–2014	Jošanica	22	(3)
2014	Tutin		
2015–2018	Jošanica	38	(2)
2018	Tutin	0	(0)
2019–	Jošanica		
- * Club domestic league appearances and goals

Edin Ferizović (Serbian Cyrillic: Един Феризовић; born 12 October 1977) is a Serbian footballer who plays as a defender for Jošanica.

== Club career ==
Born in Novi Pazar, Ferizović began his career in his native Serbia playing for FK Novi Pazar in Second League of FR Yugoslavia. Season 2002/03 he moved to FK Belasica and played in Macedonian First Football League. In early 2004 he moved back in to FK Novi Pazar and played in Serbian First League. He was half year on loan in OFK Niš. In 2007 he signed for ČSK Čelarevo. After ČSK he moved back again to FK Novi Pazar and played again in Serbian First League. Season 2008/09 he signed for Apolonia Fier and played in Albanian Superliga. He them played for Shkumbini Peqin and Besa Kavajë. In summer 2011 he moved back to FK Novi Pazar plays for first time in Serbian SuperLiga. He made his debut in Serbian SuperLiga playing against FK Sloboda Užice. In early 2012 he was out on loan to FK Sinđelić Niš and played in Serbian First League.
