= Sašo Gjoreski =

Macedonian footballer

Personal information
- Date of birth: 18 September 1982 (age 44)
- Place of birth: Sombor, Yugoslavia
- Height: 1.74 m (5 ft 9 in)
- Position: Defender

Senior career*
Years	Team	Apps	(Gls)
2003–2006	Sileks	55	(0)
2006–2007	1. FC Brno	4	(0)
2007–2008	Rabotnički	18	(0)
2008–2009	Tirana	11	(0)
2009–2010	Shkumbini	23	(1)
2011–2012	Ohrid	11	(0)
2012	11 Oktomvri	6	(0)
2012–2015	Bregalnica	59	(0)
2015-2016	Mladost CD	22	(0)
2016–2017	Bregalnica	23	(0)

International career
	Macedonia U21	2	
- * Club domestic league appearances and goals

Sašo Gjoreski (born 18 September 1982) is a Macedonian former professional footballer who played as a defender.

== Career ==
Gjoreski was born in Sombor, SR Serbia, back then within Yugoslavia. He has also played for top Albanian side KF Tirana during the 2008–2009 season, making 11 league appearances.
