= Alfred Osmani =

Albanian footballer (born 1983)

Personal information
- Full name: Alfred Osmani
- Date of birth: 20 February 1983 (age 43)
- Place of birth: Durrës, Albania
- Position: Goalkeeper

Senior career*
| Years | Team | Apps | (Gls) |
| 2000–2002 | Teuta | | |
| 2003 | Shkumbini | | |
| 2003–2005 | Teuta | | |
| 2005–2006 | Shkumbini | | |
| 2006–2007 | Teuta | 10 | (0) |
| 2007–2008 | Tirana | 12 | (0) |
| 2008–2009 | Elbasani | 31 | (0) |
| 2009–2010 | Kamza | 15 | (0) |
| 2010–2011 | Besa | 1 | (0) |
| 2011–2012 | Dinamo Tirana | 23 | (1) |
| 2012–2013 | Kastrioti | 6 | (0) |
| 2013–2015 | Teuta | 9 | (0) |

Managerial career
- 2020–: Tirana (Goalkeeper Coach)
- * Club domestic league appearances and goals

Alfred Osmani (born 20 February 1983) is an Albanian retired football goalkeeper who lat played for Teuta in the Albanian First Division. He has previously played for Dinamo Tirana, KS Shkumbini Peqin, KS Besa Kavaje, KF Tirana and most recently KF Elbasani, all of these were in the Albanian Superliga.

== Club career ==
KS Kamza is his first ever team in the Albanian First Division Osmani scored a stoppage-time equalising goal for Dinamo from the penalty spot in December 2011 against Bylis.
