= Artūrs Silagailis =

Latvian footballer and coach

Personal information
- Full name: Artūrs Silagailis
- Date of birth: 3 May 1987 (age 39)
- Place of birth: Rēzekne, Latvian SSR, USSR (now Republic of Latvia)
- Height: 1.85 m (6 ft 1 in)
- Position: Defender

Senior career*
| Years | Team | Apps | (Gls) |
| 2004–2008 | Blāzma | 55 | (2) |
| 2009–2010 | Kryvbas Kryvyi Rih | 6 | (0) |
| 2010 | → Ventspils (loan) | 5 | (0) |
| 2010 | Tirana | 7 | (0) |
| 2011 | Gomel | 0 | (0) |
| 2011 | Dnepr Mogilev | 27 | (1) |
| Total | | 100 | (3) |

International career^{‡}
| 2007–2008 | Latvia U21 | 2 | (0) |
- * Club domestic league appearances and goals as of 1 January 2012 ‡ National team caps and goals as of 4 September 2009

Artūrs Silagailis (born 3 May 1987) is a retired Latvian football defender. Currently he works as a youth coach at his hometown club Blāzma.

== Club career ==
Silagailis began his career in the local club Dižvanagi Rēzekne (later renamed SK Blāzma).

In February 2009 he signed a contract with FC Kryvbas Kryvyi Rih. He made his first-team debut in a league match against the famous FC Shakhtar Donetsk.

He found it difficult to find a place in the starting line-up, so he left the team on loan to FK Ventspils in March 2010.

In August 2010 he signed a contract with KF Tirana in Albanian Superliga. Due to the delayed salary payment he left the team in December, the same year, signing a one-year contract with an option to extend it for another season with FC Gomel, playing in the Belarusian Premier League.

Just 3 months after signing with FC Gomel, Silagailis left the club, signing for another Belarusian Premier League club Dnepr Mogilev.

== International career ==
From 2007 to 2008 Silagailis played for Latvia U-21, but he hasn't been capped for the senior side.

== Family ==
His brother Guntars is also a former professional footballer.
