= Prugoc =

Prugoc: Prugoc (Albanian); Пруговац/Prugovac (Serbian)
- Village
- Location within Kosovo
- Coordinates: 42.734081°N 21.108148°E
- Country: Kosovo
- District: Pristina
- Municipality: Pristina
- Elevation: 537 m (1,762 ft)

Population (2024)
  - Total: 2,145
- Time zone: UTC+1 (CET)
  - Summer (DST): UTC+2 (CEST)

Prugoc (Serbian Cyrillic: Пруговац/Prugovac) is a village in Pristina municipality, Kosovo.
