= KF Vlora =

Albanian football club

Vlora
- Full name: Klubi i Futbollit Vlora
- Founded: 2006
- Ground: Flamurtari Stadium
- Capacity: 9,500
- League: Kategoria Amatore I
Home colours	Away colours

Klubi i Futbollit Vlora is an Albanian professional football club based in the southern city of Vlorë. They are currently competing in the Kategoria e Parë.
