= Erbim Fagu =

Football coach

Personal information
- Date of birth: 15 April 1987 (age 39)
- Place of birth: Tirana, Albania
- Height: 1.79 m (5 ft 10 in)
- Position: Defender

Youth career
- 1993–2004: Tirana

Senior career*
Years	Team	Apps	(Gls)
2004–2008	Tirana	29	(1)
2006–2007	→ Teuta (loan)	15	(1)
2008–2009	Elbasani	14	(2)
2009–2010	Besa	32	(0)
2010–2014	Skënderbeu	57	(1)
Total		147	(5)

International career
2005–2006	Albania U19	3	(1)
2006–2007	Albania U21	6	(0)

Managerial career
- 2016–2017: Akademia e Futbollit
- 2017–2020: Football Republic
- 2021–2022: Tirana (assistant)
- 2021–2022: Tirana U-21
- 2023–2024: RKVV DEM
- 2024: Tirana
- * Club domestic league appearances and goals

Erbim Fagu (born 15 April 1987) is an Albanian professional football coach and a former defender. He retired from football at the early age of 27 due to numerous injuries. After retiring from playing football Erbim Fagu started his career as a coach. His beginnings as a coach were in the Akademia Futbollit created by two former national team players Alban Bushi and Redi Jupi. During his journey to this academy, he grew professionally and won his first trophies as a coach. After two years in this academy, Erbim Fagu was transferred to one of the best football academies in Albania, Football Republic, which was created in 2018 by Redi Jupi, with whom they had worked together before in the Akademia e Futbollit. In three years Erbim Fagu won many trophies making this academy one of the most famous in Albania. In June 2021 Erbim Fagu signed a three-year contract with the team of Tirana. He was appointed as an assistant coach in the first team and head coach Tirana U-21. This year he won the title of 26th champion with the first team. After winning Kategoria Superiore with Tirana travels abroad to the Netherlands and continue his career there. Now he works as a head coach at Coerver Coaching Netherlands, one of the best academies which stands out for its training methodology for young players. He is also started working as a head coach in RKVV DEM U-14.

== Club career ==
Fagu was signed by KF Elbasani in the summer of 2008 after agreeing on a fee believed to be around $120,000 with their fierce rivals KF Tirana. He signed for Dinamo Tirana after KF Elbasani were relegated after the 2008–09 season. Following the club's defeat and elimination from the Europa League, Fagu signed for Besa Kavajë and this year won the Albania Cup and runner-up in Albania Superliga. One year later, Fagu signed for Skenderbeu Korce and won the Albania Superliga four times in a row.

=== Skënderbeu Korçë ===
On 16 May 2011, the final day of the 2010–11 season, he suffered an injury causing distortive trauma in his left knee. He quickly traveled to Rome, Italy to see a specialist about the extent of the damage and then, on 28 May, had his knee operated on. Following the operation he continued regular physiotherapy which would enable him to begin training again in three months, but he was expected to not be able to play for at least another five months. Fagu made his long-awaited return on 12 November 2011 during the international break in a friendly against FK Renova.

== International career ==
In May 2012, Fagu was called up for the first time in senior team by the coach Gianni De Biasi for the friendly matches against Qatar and Iran.

== Style of play ==
He was a defender but he has played in defense, midfield, and as a forward, mainly on the right-hand side.

== Honours ==
=== Club ===
KF Tirana

- Albanian Superliga (1): 2004–05
- Albanian Supercup (1): 2007

Besa Kavajë

- Albanian Cup (1): 2009–10

Skënderbeu Korçë

- Albanian Superliga (4): 2010–11, 2011–12, 2012–13, 2013–14
- Albanian Cup Runner–up (1): 2011–12
- Albanian Supercup (1): 2013

== Training career ==
From 2015 to 2018 he trained at Akademia Futbollit Academy. From 2018 to 2021 he trained at Football Republic Redi Jupi Academy. He trains age levels from 7 years old to 19 years old. In 2021 Fagu signed with KF.Tirana as head coach u-21 and assistant coach in the first team. In 2022 he traveled to the Netherlands to live there and now he works as a head coach at Coerver Coaching Netherlands, one of the best academies which stands out for its training methodology for young players. He recently started working as a head coach in RKVV DEM u-14.

== Honours ==
•AKADEMIA FUTBOLLIT

- Tirana Regional Champions U-15 (2016–2017)
- Albania Champions U-15 (2016–2017)
- Tirana Regional Champions U-13 (2015–2016)

•FOOTBALL REPUBLIC

- South Albanian Champions First Category U-17 (2018–2019)
- Albania Champions First Category U-17 (2018–2019)
- South Albanian Champions First Category U-19 (2019–2020)
- Albania Champions First Category U-19 (2019–2020)

•KF.TIRANA

- Albanian Superliga (2021–2022)
