= Olti Bishani =

Albanian football goalkeeper

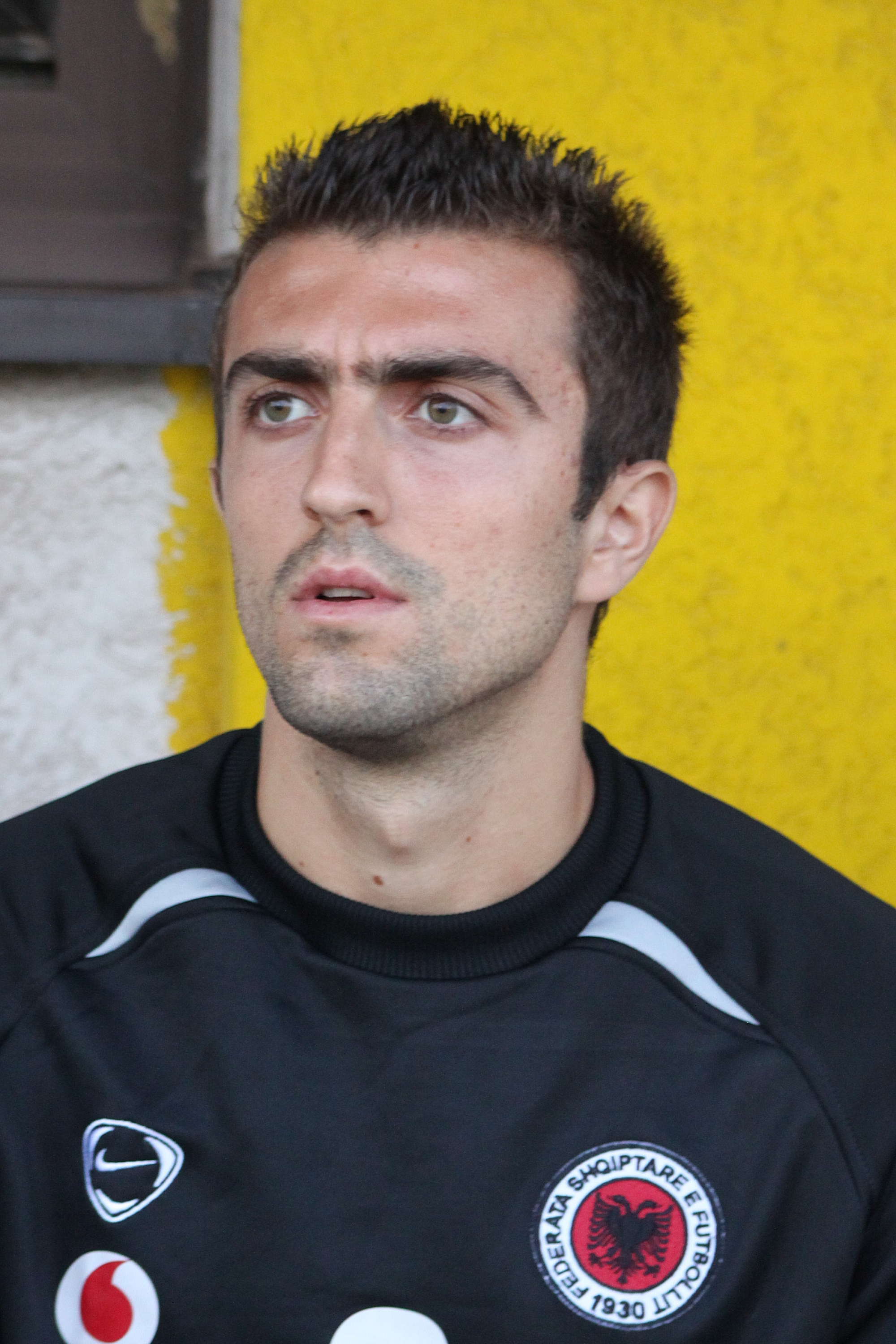

Personal information
- Full name: Oltion Bishani
- Date of birth: 11 January 1988 (age 38)
- Place of birth: Shkodër, Albania
- Height: 1.84 m (6 ft 0 in)
- Position: Goalkeeper

Senior career*
Years	Team	Apps	(Gls)
2005–2010	Vllaznia	19	(0)
2010–2011	Laçi	1	(0)
2011–2012	Ada Velipojë	3	(0)
2012–2013	Trepça	6	(0)
2014–2015	Ada Velipojë	4	(0)
2017–2020	Sporting Mertzig	29	(0)
2020–2023	US Feulen (de)	27	(0)

International career
2006–2007	Albania U19	3	(0)
2005–2009	Albania U21	1	(0)
- * Club domestic league appearances and goals as of 14 January 2015

Olsi Bishani (born 11 January 1988 in Shkodër) is an Albanian footballer who plays as a goalkeeper for KS Ada Velipojë in the Albanian First Division.
