= Akil Jakupi =

Albanian footballer

Personal information
- Full name: Akil Jakupi
- Date of birth: 1 August 1982 (age 44)
- Place of birth: Tirana, Albania
- Height: 1.83 m (6 ft 0 in)
- Position: Defender

Senior career*
Years	Team	Apps	(Gls)
2002–2003	Bylis		
2003–2004	Laçi		
2004–2005	Apolonia		
2006	Besa		
2006–2007	Turbina		
2007–2008	Burreli		
2008–2017	Teuta	124	(8)
2010–2011	→ Besa (loan)	29	(0)
2014–2015	Besëlidhja	25	(4)
2015–2016	Kastrioti	17	(1)

International career
1999	Albania U16	2	(0)

Managerial career
- 2019–: Tirana (assistant manager)
- * Club domestic league appearances and goals

Akil Jakupi (born 1 August 1982) is an Albanian retired footballer who last played for Albanian First Division side KS Kastrioti as a defender.

== Career ==
Jakupi joined Teuta Durrës in 2008 and was loaned out to Besa Kavajë for the entire 2010–11 season where he made 29 league appearances and where he won the 2010 Albanian Supercup. He returned to Teuta Durrës in the summer of 2011 where he has remained since. He signed a one-year contract extension in May 2013 keeping him at the club until the end of the 2013–14 season.
