= 2009–10 Albanian Cup =

Kupa e Shqipërisë

Tournament details
- Country: Albania

Final positions
- Champions: Besa
- Runners-up: Vllaznia

2009–10 Albanian Cup was the fifty-eighth season of Albania's annual cup competition. It began on 23 September 2009 with the First Preliminary Round. The winners of the competition qualified for the second qualifying round of the UEFA Europa League. Flamurtari were the defending champions.

The rounds were played in a two-legged format similar to those of European competitions. If the aggregated score is tied after both games, the team with the higher number of away goals advances. If the number of away goals is equal in both games, the match is decided by extra time and a penalty shootout, if necessary.

== Preliminary Tournament ==
In order to reduce the number of participating teams for the First Round to 32, a preliminary tournament was played. Only teams from the Kategoria e Dytë (third level) were allowed to enter. Each Kategoria e Dytë group played its own tournament. In contrast to the main tournament, the preliminary tournament was held as a single-leg knock-out competition.

=== First Preliminary Round ===
Games were played on 23 September 2009.

Team 1	Score	Team 2
Naftëtari	0–1 (a.e.t.)	Çlirimi
Adriatiku	2–0	Korabi
Erzeni	2–4	Iliria
Luzi 2008	w/o	Përparimi
Vlora	2–1	Këlcyra
Tomori	2–0	Përmeti
Domozdova	2–1	Maliqi
Delvina	5–0	Himara

=== Second Preliminary Round ===
Games were played on 30 September 2009.

Team 1	Score	Team 2
Luzi 2008	2–1	Çlirimi
Adriatiku	2–1	Iliria
Vlora	5–3	Delvina
Tomori	4–1	Domozdova

== First round ==
All twenty-eight teams of the 2009–10 Superiore and Kategoria e Parë entered in this round, along with the four Second Preliminary Round winners. First legs were played on 21 October 2009 and the second legs were played on 4 November 2009.

Team 1	Agg.	Team 2	1st leg	2nd leg
Luzi 2008	3–4	Tirana	3–1	0–3
Adriatiku	2–5	Dinamo Tirana	2–3	0–2
Memaliaj	1–4	Shkumbini	1–2	0–2
Pogradeci	1–3	Besa	1–2	0–1
Besëlidhja	2–6	Laçi	1–2	1–4
Sopoti	1–6	Kastrioti	0–3	1–3
Turbina	1–3	Bylis	1–0	0–3
Burreli	1–3	Lushnja	0–0	1–3
Vlora	0–4	Teuta	0–3^{1}	0–1
Gramshi	0–3	Flamurtari	0–3	0–0
Bilisht Sport	3–8	Apolonia	3–1	0–7
Skrapari	10–12	Skënderbeu	5–3	5–9
Luftëtari	2–7	Gramozi	1–3	1–4
Ada	1–2	Partizani	0–0	1–2
Dajti	2–1	Elbasani	2–1	0–0
Tomori	1–9	Vllaznia	0–4	1–5

Notes

- ^{1} The match was awarded to Teuta by 3–0 after Vlora did not secure their ground.

== Second round ==
In this round enter the 16 winners from the previous round. The first legs took place on 25 November and the second legs took place on 10 December.

Team 1	Agg.	Team 2	1st leg	2nd leg
Partizani	1–3	Teuta	1–1	0–2
Bylis	2–3	Dinamo Tirana	1–0	1–3
Lushnja	3–4	Tirana	2–2	1–2
Dajti	3–5	Vllaznia	1–3	2–2
Kastrioti	1–2	Shkumbini	1–1	0–1
Gramozi	2–1	Flamurtari	1–0	1–1
Skënderbeu	2–2	Apolonia	1–0	1–2
Laçi	1–2	Besa	0–1	1–1

== Quarter-finals ==
In this round enter the 8 winners from the previous round. The games are scheduled as shown below.

Team 1	Agg.	Team 2	1st leg	2nd leg
Gramozi	1–1 (a)	Teuta	1–1	0–0
Besa	4–4 (a)	Tirana	2–0	2–4
Shkumbini	3–1	Dinamo Tirana	2–1	1–0
Skënderbeu	0–4	Vllaznia	0–0	0–4

== Semi-finals ==
In this round enter the four winners from the previous round.

Team 1	Agg.	Team 2	1st leg	2nd leg
Besa	2–1	Shkumbini	1–1	1–0
Teuta	1–2	Vllaznia	1–0	0–2

24 March 2010	Besa	1–1	Shkumbini	Besa Stadium, Kavajë
15:00 CEST	Xhafaj 26'		Bakiu 5'

7 April 2010	Shkumbini	0–1	Besa	Shkumbini Stadium, Peqin
15:00 CEST			Cikalleshi 69'

Besa advanced to the final.

24 March 2010	Teuta	1–0	Vllaznia	Niko Dovana Stadium, Durrës
15:00 CEST	Mile 45'

7 April 2010	Vllaznia	2–0	Teuta	Loro Boriçi Stadium, Shkodër
15:00 CEST	Hadžibulić 72'; Smajli 78'

Vllaznia advanced to the final.

== Final ==
9 May 2010
20:45

Besa	2–1 (a.e.t.)	Vllaznia
Arapi 85'; Dhëmbi 97'		Balaj 63'

Qemal Stafa Stadium, Tirana
Attendance: 10,000
Referee: Darko Čeferin (Slovenia)
