= 2019–20 FK Partizani Tirana season =

Partizani Tirana
2019–20 season
- President: Gazmend Demi
- Head coach: Franco Lerda (until 14 December 2019); Renaldo Kalari (interim) (from 14 December 2019 to 4 January 2020); Adolfo Sormani (from 4 January to 9 June 2020); Renaldo Kalari (interim) (from 9 June 2020)
- Stadium: Selman Stërmasi Stadium
- Kategoria Superiore: 6th
- Albanian Cup: Second round
- Albanian Supercup: Winners
- Champions League: First qualifying round
- Europa League: Second qualifying round
- Top goalscorer: League: Eraldo Çinari (10); All: Eraldo Çinari (11)
- Highest home attendance: 19,000 vs Tirana (13 December 2019)
- Lowest home attendance: 400 vs Laçi (25 November 2019)
Home colours	Away colours	Third colours

In the 2019–20 season, Partizani Tirana competed in the Kategoria Superiore for the seventh consecutive season.

== Players ==
As of 19 June 2019

Note: Flags indicate national team as defined under FIFA eligibility rules; some limited exceptions apply. Players may hold more than one non-FIFA nationality.

No.	Pos.	Nation	Player
2	DF	MKD	Egzon Belica
4	MF	KOS	Rron Broja
5	DF	ROU	Deian Boldor (on loan from Hellas Verona)
7	MF	ALB	Eraldo Çinari
8	MF	VEN	Aristóteles Romero (on loan from Crotone)
9	FW	NGR	Theophilus Solomon
10	MF	ALB	Jasir Asani
11	MF	ALB	Jurgen Bardhi
12	GK	ALB	Alban Hoxha (captain)
15	MF	GAM	Tijan Jaiteh
16	MF	ALB	Alessio Hyseni
17	MF	ALB	Bruno Telushi
18	MF	BRA	Lucas Cardoso
19	MF	ALB	Lorenc Trashi
20	MF	ALB	Esat Mala

No.	Pos.	Nation	Player
22	DF	KOS	Labinot Ibrahimi
23	DF	ALB	Esin Hakaj
26	DF	BRA	Cordeiro
31	MF	ALB	Eneid Kodra
33	DF	ALB	Eneo Bitri
38	MF	ALB	Kristi Kote
66	FW	GHA	Joseph Ekuban (on loan from Hellas Verona)
77	GK	ALB	Aldo Teqja
90	MF	GHA	Emmanuel Mensah
98	GK	ALB	Livio Malaj
99	FW	JAM	Brian Brown
—	DF	ALB	Hektor Idrizaj
—	DF	ALB	Renaldo Kalari
—	MF	NGR	Henry Okebugwu

== Transfers ==
=== Summer ===
In: Note: Flags indicate national team as defined under FIFA eligibility rules; some limited exceptions apply. Players may hold more than one non-FIFA nationality.

No.	Pos.	Nation	Player
4	MF	KOS	Rron Broja (from (North Macedonia) Shkupi)
5	DF	ROU	Deian Boldor (on loan from (Italy) Hellas Verona)
8	MF	VEN	Aristóteles Romero (on loan from (Italy) Crotone)
9	FW	NGR	Theophilus Solomon (from (Hungary) Újpest)
23	DF	ALB	Esin Hakaj (from (Albania) Teuta)
26	DF	BRA	Cordeiro (from (Albania) Kukësi)
66	FW	GHA	Joseph Ekuban (on loan from (Italy) Hellas Verona)
77	GK	ALB	Aldo Teqja (from (Albania) Skënderbeu)
99	FW	JAM	Brian Brown (from (United States) Reno 1868)

Out: Note: Flags indicate national team as defined under FIFA eligibility rules; some limited exceptions apply. Players may hold more than one non-FIFA nationality.

No.	Pos.	Nation	Player
1	GK	ALB	Dashamir Xhika (released)
5	DF	KOS	Lum Rexhepi (released)
23	MF	USA	Dilly Duka (released)
36	DF	NGR	Sodiq Atanda (to (Israel) Hapoel Kfar Saba)

== Competitions ==
=== Overview ===
Competition	First match	Last match	Starting round	Final position	Record							
Competition	First match	Last match	Starting round	Final position	Pld	W	D	L	GF	GA	GD	Win %
Kategoria Superiore	23 August 2019	29 July 2020	Matchday 1	6th	36	15	8	13	51	40	+11	41.67
Albanian Cup	18 September 2019	12 February 2020	First round	Second round	4	3	0	1	7	4	+3	75.00
Albanian Supercup	18 August 2019		Final	Winners	1	1	0	0	4	2	+2	100.00
Champions League	9 July 2019	17 July 2019	First qualifying round	First qualifying round	2	0	1	1	0	2	−2	0.00
Europa League	25 July 2019	1 August 2019	Second qualifying round	Second qualifying round	2	0	1	1	1	2	−1	0.00
Total					45	19	10	16	63	50	+13	42.22

Last updated: 29 July 2020
Source: Competitions

=== Albanian Supercup ===
18 August 2019 Final	Partizani	4–2	Kukësi	Elbasan
19:00 CEST	Mala 5' (yellow card) 32'; Brown 88', 94', 99'; Telushi (yellow card) 36'; Romero (yellow card) 109'; Çinari (yellow card) 111'	Report	Kotobelli (yellow card) 28'; Musta 35', 56'; Maliqi (yellow card) 43'; Teqja (yellow card) 60'; Daku (yellow card) 85'; Musolli (yellow card) 109'	Stadium: Elbasan Arena; Attendance: 400; Referee: Eldorjan Hamiti

=== Kategoria Superiore ===
==== League table ====
Pos	Team	Pld	W	D	L	GF	GA	GD	Pts	Qualification or relegation
4	Skënderbeu	36	17	7	12	42	43	−1	58	
5	Teuta	36	15	12	9	41	34	+7	57	Qualification for the Europa League first qualifying round (Note: Teuta qualified for the Europa League first qualifying round as the 2019–20 Albanian Cup winners.)
6	Partizani	36	15	8	13	51	40	+11	53	
7	Bylis	36	12	15	9	46	38	+8	51	
8	Vllaznia (O)	36	12	10	14	36	41	−5	46	Qualification for the relegation play-off

Source: Albanian Football Association, Soccerway
Rules for classification: 1) Points; 2) Head-to-head points; 3) Head-to-head goal difference; 4) Head-to-head goals scored; 5) Goal difference; 6) Goals scored; 7) Draw.
(O) Play-off winners

==== Results summary ====
Overall								Home						Away					
Pld	W	D	L	GF	GA	GD	Pts	W	D	L	GF	GA	GD	W	D	L	GF	GA	GD
36	15	8	13	51	40	+11	53	9	5	4	30	15	+15	6	3	9	21	25	−4

Last updated: 29 July 2020.
Source: Competitive matches

==== Results by round ====
Round	1	2	3	4	5	6	7	8	9	10	11	12	13	14	15	16	17	18	19	20	21	22	23	24	25	26	27	28	29	30	31	32	33	34	35	36
Ground	A	A	H	A	H	A	H	A	H	H	H	A	H	A	H	A	H	A	A	A	H	A	H	A	H	A	H	H	H	A	H	A	H	A	H	A
Result	L	W	W	L	D	W	D	W	W	D	W	D	W	L	L	L	W	L	L	W	W	W	D	L	L	L	L	L	W	W	W	D	D	D	W	L
Position	9	6	4	5	6	5	5	2	1	1	1	1	1	1	4	4	4	4	4	4	4	4	4	4	5	6	6	6	6	6	6	6	6	6	6	6

Updated to match(es) played on 29 July 2020. Source: Competitive matches
A = Away; H = Home; W = Win; D = Draw; L = Loss

==== Matches ====
23 August 2019 1	Kukësi	1–0	Partizani	Elbasan
19:00 CEST	Shkurti 39' (pen.); Musta (yellow card) 47'; Lulaj (red card) 62'; Avdyli (yellow card) 78'; Limaj (yellow card) 87'	Report	Bitri (yellow card) 41'; Telushi (yellow card) 44'; Solomon (red card) 62'; Belica (yellow card) 90+5'	Stadium: Elbasan Arena; Attendance: 1,000; Referee: Enea Jorgji

28 August 2019 2	Luftëtari	0–1	Partizani	Gjirokastër
16:00 CEST	Dushkaj (yellow card) 51'; Lala (yellow card) 51'; Rapo (yellow card) 84'	Report	Telushi 15'; Asani (yellow card) 68'; Romero (yellow card) 81'	Stadium: Gjirokastra Stadium; Attendance: 1,000; Referee: Orlando Kuka

1 September 2019 3	Partizani	1–0	Flamurtari	Tirana
19:00 CEST	Solomon 22' (red card) 30'	Report	Zeqaj (yellow card) 60' (yellow-red card) 86'; Nebihi (yellow card) 65'; Deliaj (yellow card) 70'	Stadium: Selman Stërmasi Stadium; Attendance: 1,000; Referee: Blerim Ziri

15 September 2019 4	Laçi	1–0	Partizani	Laç
16:00 CEST	Shehu (yellow card) 58'; Lushkja 60'	Report	Çinari (yellow card) 6'; Ekuban (yellow card) 81'	Stadium: Laçi Stadium; Attendance: 1,000; Referee: Eldorjan Hamiti

21 September 2019 5	Partizani	1–1	Bylis	Tirana
16:00 CEST	Romero (yellow card) 62'; Peposhi 72' (o.g.); Bitri (yellow card) 88'	Report	Turabov (yellow card) 45+1'; Mëllugja (yellow card) 62'; Ujka (yellow card) 64'; Bicaj (yellow card) 70'; Ntephe 90+3'	Stadium: Selman Stërmasi Stadium; Attendance: 700; Referee: Kreshnik Cjapi

29 September 2019 6	Tirana	1–2	Partizani	Tirana
19:00 CEST	Torassa (yellow card) 46'; Çelhaka (yellow card) 76'; Hasani 79'; Batha (yellow card) 84'	Report	Cordeiro 28' (yellow card) 84'; Solomon 34'; Broja (yellow card) 50'; Mala (yellow card) 55'; Belica (yellow card) 69'; Hakaj (yellow card) 90+1'	Stadium: Selman Stërmasi Stadium; Attendance: 9,000; Referee: Kridens Meta

5 October 2019 7	Partizani	1–1	Teuta	Tirana
17:00 CEST	Romero (yellow card) 13' (yellow-red card) 35'; Trashi 45+3'; Cordeiro (yellow card) 65'	Report	Aleksi (yellow card) 17'; Vila (yellow card) 33'; Avdyli 37' (yellow card) 73'; Arapi (yellow card) 68'	Stadium: Selman Stërmasi Stadium; Attendance: 0 Referee: Eldorjan Hamiti

19 October 2019 8	Vllaznia	1–3	Partizani	Shkodër
17:00 CEST	Marku (yellow card) 9'; Krymi 18' (yellow card) 36'; Ramadani (yellow card) 61'	Report	Cordeiro 14'; Broja (yellow card) 22'; Asani (yellow card) 53' (goal) 90+4'; Çinari 90+2'	Stadium: Loro Boriçi Stadium; Attendance: 6,000; Referee: Andi Koçi

24 October 2019 9	Partizani	3–1	Skënderbeu	Tirana
15:00 CEST	Belica 3'; Telushi 19' (yellow card) 61'; Çinari 60'; Romero (yellow card) 67'	Report	Gripshi 44'; Essien (yellow card) 64'	Stadium: Selman Stërmasi Stadium; Attendance: 1,000; Referee: Olsid Ferataj

28 October 2019 10	Partizani	0–0	Kukësi	Tirana
18:00 CET	Boldor (yellow card) 24'; Broja (yellow card) 40'	Report	Rroca (yellow card) 30'; Obanor (yellow card) 43'; Lulaj (yellow card) 90+2'	Stadium: Selman Stërmasi Stadium; Attendance: 2,000; Referee: Kridens Meta

3 November 2019 11	Partizani	2–0	Luftëtari	Tirana
17:00 CET	Çinari 53'; Asani 56' (pen.); Idrizaj (yellow card) 75'	Report	Rapo (yellow card) 18'; Dragoshi (yellow card) 20'	Stadium: Selman Stërmasi Stadium; Attendance: 800; Referee: Klodian Shahini

10 November 2019 12	Flamurtari	1–1	Partizani	Vlorë
16:30 CET	Bajraktarević (yellow card) 24'; Nebihi 58'; Zeqaj (yellow card) 90'	Report	Belica 54'	Stadium: Flamurtari Stadium; Attendance: 900; Referee: Enea Jorgji

25 November 2019 13	Partizani	1–0	Laçi	Tirana
18:00 CET	Asani 26' (yellow card) 69'; Bardhi (yellow card) 41'	Report	Trokthi (yellow card) 37'; Turkaj (yellow card) 60'; Domgjoni (yellow card) 80'; Nwabueze (yellow card) 90'	Stadium: Selman Stërmasi Stadium; Attendance: 400; Referee: Laver Alla

7 December 2019 14	Bylis	2–1	Partizani	Ballsh
13:00 CET	Ndreca 6'; Peposhi (yellow card) 22'; Janku (yellow card) 47'; Guindo 54'; Mëllugja (yellow card) 65'; Murataj (yellow card) 81'	Report	Bardhi 26' (yellow card) 30'; Broja (yellow card) 36'; Telushi (yellow card) 81' (yellow-red card) 88'	Stadium: Adush Muça Stadium; Attendance: 800; Referee: Eldorjan Hamiti

13 December 2019 15	Partizani	1–2	Tirana	Tirana
19:00 CET	Bitri (yellow card) 3'; Bardhi 11'; Hyseni (yellow card) 24'; Romero (yellow card) 57'; Trashi (yellow card) 59'; Cordeiro (yellow card) 79'	Report	Batha 7'; Vangjeli (yellow card) 37'; Ngoo (yellow card) 59'; Cobbinah (yellow card) 70' (yellow-red card) 90+2' (goal) 90+1'; Çelhaka (yellow card) 75'; Ismailgeci (yellow card) 90+2'; Muça (yellow card) 90+4'	Stadium: Arena Kombëtare; Attendance: 19,000; Referee: Enea Jorgji

18 December 2019 16	Teuta	1–0	Partizani	Durrës
13:00 CET	Shkalla (yellow card) 43' (yellow-red card) 90'; Kallaku 45' (pen.); Duka (red card) 64'; Beqja (red card) 64'; Frashëri (yellow card) 90'	Report	Broja (yellow card) 12'; Solomon (yellow card) 64'; Boldor (red card) 64'; Cordeiro (red card) 64'; Trashi (yellow card) 90+6'	Stadium: Niko Dovana Stadium; Attendance: 800; Referee: Olsid Ferataj

22 December 2019 17	Partizani	1–0	Vllaznia	Tirana
16:00 CET	Bitri 62'	Report	Walsuimbi (yellow card) 36'; Krymi (yellow card) 68'	Stadium: Selman Stërmasi Stadium; Attendance: 700; Referee: Andi Koçi

21 January 2020 18	Skënderbeu	3–2	Partizani	Korçë
16:00 CET	Položani (yellow card) 7'; Ndecky (yellow card) 41'; Bitri 43' (o.g.); Krasniqi 45+1'; Imami (yellow card) 67'; Koliçi (yellow card) 68'; Dita (yellow card) 72'; Agon Elezi (yellow card) 80'; Bregu 83'	Report	Telushi 8' (pen.) (yellow card) 12'; Broja (yellow card) 16' (yellow-red card) 39'; Dita 90+2' (o.g.)	Stadium: Skënderbeu Stadium; Attendance: 3,500; Referee: Adrian Beqiri

26 January 2020 19	Kukësi	1–0	Partizani	Tirana
19:00 CET	Abazaj 67'; Maliqi (yellow card) 90'	Report	Brown (yellow card) 18'; Solomon (yellow card) 54'; Hoxha (yellow card) 67'; Idrizaj (yellow card) 72'; Belica (yellow card) 83'	Stadium: Arena Kombëtare; Attendance: 4,800; Referee: Eldorjan Hamiti

2 February 2020 20	Luftëtari	0–3	Partizani	Gjirokastër
14:00 CET	Dushkaj (yellow card) 61'	Report	Solomon 2'; Broja 18'; Cordeiro 72'	Stadium: Gjirokastra Stadium; Attendance: 200; Referee: Kridens Meta

8 February 2020 21	Partizani	2–0	Flamurtari	Tirana
17:00 CET	Çinari 62' (pen.); Trashi 71' (yellow card) 85'	Report	Muçollari (yellow card) 62'; Llapi (yellow card) 90+2'	Stadium: Selman Stërmasi Stadium; Attendance: 500; Referee: Roxhers Muska

16 February 2020 22	Laçi	1–3	Partizani	Laç
14:00 CET	Xhixha 28'	Report	Telushi 31', 82'; Bitri 34' (yellow card) 73'; Solomon (yellow card) 69'	Stadium: Laçi Stadium; Attendance: 1,000; Referee: Juxhin Xhaja

22 February 2020 23	Partizani	2–2	Bylis	Tirana
17:00 CET	Cordeiro 4'; Çinari 18'	Report	Ntephe 30'; Mozzone (yellow card) 42'; Murataj (yellow card) 60'; Guindo 86' (yellow card) 87'	Stadium: Arena Kombëtare; Attendance: 1,900; Referee: Andi Koçi

28 February 2020 24	Tirana	5–1	Partizani	Tirana
19:00 CET	Batha 14' (pen.), 19' (pen.); Doka (yellow card) 45+1'; Elton Calé (yellow card) 56'; Idrizaj 62' (o.g.); Muçi 81', 90+2' (yellow card) 82'; Cobbinah (yellow card) 83'; Torassa (red card) 89'; Vangjeli (yellow card) 90+1'	Report	Cordeiro 2' (yellow card) 12'; Bitri (red card) 14'; Çinari (yellow card) 73'; Hakaj (yellow card) 90+1'	Stadium: Arena Kombëtare; Attendance: 19,625; Referee: Juxhin Xhaja

4 March 2020 25	Partizani	0–1	Teuta	Tirana
17:00 CET	Telushi (yellow card) 20'	Report	Kallaku 68'; Hoxha (yellow card) 90+2'; Todorovski (yellow card) 90+3'	Stadium: Selman Stërmasi Stadium; Attendance: 500; Referee: Eldorjan Hamiti

9 March 2020 26	Vllaznia	1–0	Partizani	Shkodër
18:00 CET	Lika 35' (pen.); Ramadani (yellow card) 85'; Kruja (yellow card) 90'	Report	Cordeiro (yellow card) 50'; Telushi (yellow card) 66'	Stadium: Loro Boriçi Stadium; Attendance: 0 Referee: Kreshnik Cjapi

3 June 2020 27	Partizani	1–2	Skënderbeu	Tirana
20:00 CEST	Bitri (yellow card) 41'; Broja (yellow card) 63'; Ferati 85'	Report	Gripshi 42'; Dita 43' (yellow card) 51'; Daja (yellow card) 50'; Položani (yellow card) 77'	Stadium: Selman Stërmasi Stadium; Attendance: 0 Referee: Enea Jorgji

7 June 2020 28	Partizani	1–3	Kukësi	Tirana
17:00 CEST	Bitri (yellow card) 28'; Solomon 72'	Report	Obanor (yellow card) 21'; Abazaj 45'; Boldor 51' (o.g.); Ethemi 62'; Musolli (yellow card) 76'	Stadium: Selman Stërmasi Stadium; Attendance: 0 Referee: Olsid Ferataj

14 June 2020 29	Partizani	8–1	Luftëtari	Tirana
17:00 CEST	Çinari 9', 16', 45+2', 69'; Broja 30' (yellow card) 61'; Cordeiro (yellow card) 43'; Dragoshi 80' (o.g.); Solomon 81'; Ferati (yellow card) 87'; Cara 90+3' (pen.)	Report	Isufi (yellow card) 14'; Hyseni (yellow card) 33' (yellow-red card) 41'; Lika 37'	Stadium: Selman Stërmasi Stadium; Attendance: 0 Referee: Kreshnik Barjamaj

19 June 2020 30	Flamurtari	1–2	Partizani	Vlorë
17:00 CEST	Índio Oliveira 38'	Report	Bitri 36'; Bardhi 67'; Idrizaj (yellow card) 90+1'	Stadium: Flamurtari Stadium; Attendance: 0 Referee: Kreshnik Cjapi

27 June 2020 31	Partizani	1–0	Laçi	Tirana
17:00 CEST	Çinari 10'; Boldor (yellow card) 49'; Bitri (yellow card) 58'; Solomon (yellow card) 89'	Report	Shehu (yellow card) 45'; Nwabueze (yellow card) 62'; Lushkja (yellow card) 71'	Stadium: Selman Stërmasi Stadium; Attendance: 0 Referee: Kreshnik Barjamaj

6 July 2020 32	Bylis	1–1	Partizani	Ballsh
17:45 CEST	Ndreca 18'; Shkalla (yellow card) 29'; Mëllugja (yellow card) 73' (yellow-red card) 87'; Hidi (yellow card) 90'	Report	Brown 70'	Stadium: Adush Muça Stadium; Attendance: 0 Referee: Klajdi Kola

10 July 2020 33	Partizani	1–1	Tirana	Tirana
20:45 CEST	Broja (yellow card) 64'; Telushi (yellow card) 71'; Cordeiro 76'	Report	Çelhaka (yellow card) 19'; Batha (yellow card) 67'; Torassa (yellow card) 71'; Muçi 90+2'	Stadium: Selman Stërmasi Stadium; Attendance: 0 Referee: Eldorjan Hamiti

19 July 2020 34	Teuta	0–0	Partizani	Durrës
20:45 CEST	Kapllani (yellow card) 41'	Report	Bitri (yellow card) 89'	Stadium: Niko Dovana Stadium; Attendance: 0 Referee: Juxhin Xhaja

24 July 2020 35	Partizani	3–0	Vllaznia	Tirana
17:45 CEST	Bardhi (yellow card) 11'; Trashi (yellow card) 15'; Solomon 21'; Cordeiro 43'; Mala 74'	Report	Adili (yellow card) 81'	Stadium: Selman Stërmasi Stadium; Attendance: 0 Referee: Eldorjan Hamiti

29 July 2020 36	Skënderbeu	4–1	Partizani	Korçë
20:45 CEST	Gripshi 19'; Krasniqi 20'; Taipi 54'; Jashanica (yellow card) 58'; Bregu 63'	Report	Pëllumbi 49' (o.g.); Kodra (yellow card) 66'	Stadium: Skënderbeu Stadium; Attendance: 0 Referee: Kridens Meta

=== Albanian Cup ===
==== First round ====
18 September 2019 First leg	Vora	0–3	Partizani	Pezë Helmës
16:00 CEST	Toli (yellow card) 30'	Report	Solomon 64'; Brown 74'; Çinari 78'	Stadium: Internacional Complex; Referee: Endrit Zhuli

2 October 2019 Second leg	Partizani	1–0 (4–0 agg.)	Vora	Pezë Helmës
14:00 CEST	Telushi (yellow card) 45+1' (goal) 68' (pen.); Tushi (yellow card) 64'	Report	Deliallisi (yellow card) 67'	Stadium: Internacional Complex; Referee: Ervis Alliaj

==== Second round ====
29 January 2020 First leg	Besëlidhja	3–0	Partizani	Lezhë
14:00 CET	Bushi 13'; Jovanović 26'; Dibra (yellow card) 42'; Fetaj 44'	Report	Cara (yellow card) 40'; Cordeiro (yellow card) 58'; Broja (yellow card) 78'	Stadium: Brian Filipi Stadium; Attendance: 1,000; Referee: Blerim Ziri

12 February 2020 Second leg	Partizani	3–1 (3–4 agg.)	Besëlidhja	Elbasan
13:30 CET	Telushi 8', 20' (pen.), 84'; Kote (yellow card) 37'	Report	Hajdari 5'; Fetaj (yellow card) 27'; Jovanović (yellow card) 45'; Dibra (yellow card) 56'	Stadium: Elbasan Arena; Attendance: 700; Referee: Kridens Meta

=== UEFA Champions League ===
==== First qualifying round ====
10 July 2019 First leg	Partizani (Albania)	0–0	(Azerbaijan) Qarabağ	Tirana, Albania
17:30	Çinari (yellow card) 83'	Report		Stadium: Selman Stërmasi Stadium; Attendance: 2,120; Referee: Thorvaldur Árnason (Iceland)

17 July 2019 Second leg	Qarabağ (Azerbaijan)	2–0 (2–0 agg.)	(Albania) Partizani	Baku, Azerbaijan
19:00	Medvedev (yellow card) 38'; Míchel (yellow card) 41'; Ozobić 51'; Mammadov (yellow card) 54'; Quintana 90+4'	Report	Hakaj (yellow card) 64'; Ekuban (yellow card) 90+2'	Stadium: Dalga Arena (Note: Qarabağ play their home matches at Dalga Arena, Baku, instead of their regular stadium Azersun Arena, Baku.); Attendance: 5,932; Referee: Dumitru Muntean (Moldova)

=== UEFA Europa League ===
==== Second qualifying round ====
25 July 2019 First leg	Partizani (Albania)	0–1	(Moldova) Sheriff Tiraspol	Tirana, Albania
17:30	Ibrahimi (yellow card) 19'	Report	Tambe 23' (yellow card) 58'; N'Diaye (yellow card) 36'; Anton (yellow card) 47'; Balima (yellow card) 90+7'	Stadium: Selman Stërmasi Stadium; Attendance: 1,750; Referee: Kirill Levnikov (Russia)

1 August 2019 Second leg	Sheriff Tiraspol (Moldova)	1–1 (2–1 agg.)	(Albania) Partizani	Tiraspol, Moldova
19:00	Anton (yellow card) 9'; Mužek (yellow card) 53'; N'Diaye (yellow card) 61' (goal) 63'; Jach (yellow card) 87'; Balima (yellow card) 90+5'	Report	Solomon (yellow card) 28'; Asani 29' (yellow card) 70'; Boldor (yellow card) 62'; Mala (yellow card) 65'; Broja (yellow card) 80'; Belica (yellow card) 90+2'	Stadium: Sheriff Stadium; Attendance: 5,248; Referee: Igor Pajač (Croatia)
