= 2018–19 FK Partizani Tirana season =

Partizani Tirana
2018–19 season
- President: Gazmend Demi
- Head coach: Skënder Gega
- Stadium: Selman Stërmasi Stadium
- Kategoria Superiore: 1st
- Albanian Cup: Quarter-finals
- Europa League: First qualifying round
- Top goalscorer: League: Jasir Asani (8); All: Eraldo Çinari (10)
- Highest home attendance: 8,000 vs Tirana (13 May 2019)
- Lowest home attendance: 50 vs Tërbuni Pukë (25 September 2018)
Home colours	Away colours	Third colours

In the 2018–19 season, Partizani Tirana competed in the Kategoria Superiore for the sixth consecutive season. The club won the title for the first time since 1992–93 season and for the 16th time total.

== Players ==
As of 14 January 2019

Note: Flags indicate national team as defined under FIFA eligibility rules; some limited exceptions apply. Players may hold more than one non-FIFA nationality.

No.	Pos.	Nation	Player
1	GK	ALB	Dashamir Xhika
2	DF	MKD	Egzon Belica
4	DF	KOS	Lum Rexhepi
7	FW	ALB	Eraldo Çinari
9	FW	ALB	Rubin Hebaj
10	MF	ALB	Jasir Asani
11	MF	ALB	Jurgen Bardhi
12	GK	ALB	Alban Hoxha (captain)
17	MF	ALB	Bruno Telushi
18	FW	BRA	Lucas Cardoso
19	MF	ALB	Lorenc Trashi
20	MF	ALB	Esat Mala

No.	Pos.	Nation	Player
22	DF	KOS	Labinot Ibrahimi (vice-captain)
23	MF	USA	Dilly Duka
27	MF	ALB	Ardit Hila
31	DF	ALB	Eneid Kodra
33	DF	ALB	Eneo Bitri
36	DF	NGR	Sodiq Atanda
38	MF	ALB	Kristi Kote
90	FW	GHA	Emmanuel Mensah
95	GK	ALB	Livio Malaj
99	DF	ALB	Renaldo Kalari
—	MF	ALB	Alessio Hyseni
—	MF	MKD	Fatjon Jusufi

=== Left club during season ===
Note: Flags indicate national team as defined under FIFA eligibility rules; some limited exceptions apply. Players may hold more than one non-FIFA nationality.

No.	Pos.	Nation	Player
3	DF	NGR	Alma Wakili (released)
5	DF	BIH	Renato Gojković (to Zrinjski Mostar)
7	MF	ALB	Gerhard Progni (to Teuta)

No.	Pos.	Nation	Player
13	DF	ALB	Senad Hysenaj (to Besa)
15	DF	KOS	Rron Statovci (to Llapi)
16	MF	PRK	So Hyon-uk (released)

== Friendlies ==
=== Mid-season ===
9 January 2019 Friendly	Sivasspor (Turkey)	1–1	(Albania) Partizani	Antalya, Turkey
13:00 CET	Torje 67' (pen.)		Asani 47'

11 January 2019 Friendly	Antalyaspor (Turkey)	1–1	(Albania) Partizani	Antalya, Turkey
14:00 CET	Sinik 2'		Bardhi 49'

14 January 2019 Friendly	Dinamo Zagreb (Croatia)	2–1	(Albania) Partizani	Antalya, Turkey
15:00 CET	Moro 27'; Petković 52'		Bardhi 13'

== Competitions ==
=== Overview ===
Competition	First match	Last match	Starting round	Final position	Record							
Competition	First match	Last match	Starting round	Final position	Pld	W	D	L	GF	GA	GD	Win %
Kategoria Superiore	17 August 2018	30 May 2019	Matchday 1	Winners	36	20	10	6	45	22	+23	55.56
Albanian Cup	12 September 2018	3 April 2019	First round	Quarter-finals	6	4	0	2	13	5	+8	66.67
Europa League	12 July 2018	19 July 2018	First qualifying round	First qualifying round	2	0	0	2	0	3	−3	0.00
Total					44	24	10	10	58	30	+28	54.55

Last updated: 30 May 2019
Source: Competitions

=== Kategoria Superiore ===
==== League table ====
Pos	Team	Pld	W	D	L	GF	GA	GD	Pts	Qualification or relegation
1	Partizani (C)	36	20	10	6	45	22	+23	70	Qualification for the Champions League first qualifying round
2	Kukësi	36	17	8	11	42	29	+13	59	Qualification for the Europa League first qualifying round (Note: Since the winners of the 2018–19 Albanian Cup, Kukësi, qualified for European competition based on league position, the spot awarded to the cup winners was passed down to the sixth-placed team, Laçi, since the fourth-placed team and the fifth-placed team failed to obtain a UEFA license.)
3	Teuta	36	15	12	9	43	36	+7	57	Qualification for the Europa League first qualifying round
4	Skënderbeu (Note: In March 2018, Skënderbeu was handed a 10-year ban from UEFA club competitions over match fixing.)	36	17	4	15	45	30	+15	55	
5	Flamurtari (Note: Flamurtari failed to obtain a UEFA license.)	36	15	9	12	35	32	+3	54	

Source: Albanian Football Association, Soccerway
Rules for classification: 1) Points; 2) Head-to-head points; 3) Head-to-head goal difference; 4) Head-to-head goals scored; 5) Goal difference; 6) Goals scored; 7) Draw.
(C) Champions

==== Results summary ====
Overall								Home						Away					
Pld	W	D	L	GF	GA	GD	Pts	W	D	L	GF	GA	GD	W	D	L	GF	GA	GD
36	20	10	6	45	22	+23	70	13	3	2	30	11	+19	7	7	4	15	11	+4

Source: Competitive matches

==== Results by round ====
Round	1	2	3	4	5	6	7	8	9	10	11	12	13	14	15	16	17	18	19	20	21	22	23	24	25	26	27	28	29	30	31	32	33	34	35	36
Ground	A	A	H	A	H	A	H	A	H	H	H	A	H	A	H	A	H	A	A	A	H	A	H	A	H	A	H	H	H	A	H	A	H	A	H	A
Result	L	W	W	D	W	W	W	W	W	L	W	W	W	L	W	D	D	D	W	W	W	L	W	D	W	D	L	W	W (Note: The round 29 match was awarded to Partizani due to the exclusion of Kamza.)	D	D	W	W	L	D	D
Position	9	4	3	3	3	2	1	1	1	2	2	1	1	1	1	1	1	1	1	1	1	1	1	1	1	1	1	1	1	1	1	1	1	1	1	1

Source: Competitive matches
A = Away; H = Home; W = Win; D = Draw; L = Loss

==== Matches ====
17 August 2018 1	Skënderbeu	1–0	Partizani	Korçë
19:45 CEST	Radaš (yellow card) 39'; Bregu (yellow card) 40'; Ajzeraj (yellow card) 78'; Muzaka 90+14' (pen.)	Report	Progni (yellow card) 21'; Asani (yellow card) 39'; Atanda (yellow card) 32'; Hoxha (yellow card) 90'; Hila (yellow card) 90+9'	Stadium: Skënderbeu Stadium; Attendance: 5,000; Referee: Eldorjan Hamiti

25 August 2018 2	Kamza	0–1	Partizani	Kamëz
16:45 CEST		Report	Telushi (yellow card) 32' (goal) 67'	Stadium: Kamëz Stadium; Attendance: 0 (Note: The match was played behind the doors closed.); Referee: Olsi Sokoli

1 September 2018 3	Partizani	1–0	Kastrioti	Tirana
19:45 CEST	Asani 13'; Hebaj (yellow card) 32'; Kalari (yellow card) 86'	Report	Çutra (yellow card) 72'	Stadium: Selman Stërmasi Stadium; Attendance: 0 (Note: The match was played behind the doors closed.); Referee: Emirjon Sino

16 September 2018 4	Laçi	0–0	Partizani	Laç
15:45 CEST	Eller (yellow card) 57'; Lushkja (yellow card) 61'	Report	Atanda (yellow card) 20'; Bardhi (yellow card) 60'; Ibrahimi (yellow card) 76'; Hila (yellow card) 82'	Stadium: Laçi Stadium; Attendance: 1,000; Referee: Ardian Beqiri

21 September 2018 5	Partizani	2–0	Flamurtari	Tirana
19:45 CEST	Mensah 21'; Telushi 90'	Report	Sârghi (yellow card) 24'; Beqaj (yellow card) 57'	Stadium: Selman Stërmasi Stadium; Attendance: 2,500; Referee: Kreshnik Cjapi

28 September 2018 6	Tirana	0–1	Partizani	Tirana
19:45 CEST	Turtulli (yellow card) 19'; Mawejje (yellow card) 29'; Blazhevski (yellow card) 69'	Report	Mala 22'; Hila (yellow card) 40'; Belica (yellow card) 51'; Telushi (yellow card) 56'; Trashi (yellow card) 68'	Stadium: Selman Stërmasi Stadium; Attendance: 7,000; Referee: Enea Jorgji

3 October 2018 7	Partizani	3–0	Teuta	Tirana
16:45 CEST	Asani 29', 41'; Telushi (yellow card) 38'; Mensah 82'	Report	Hakaj (yellow card) 38'	Stadium: Selman Stërmasi Stadium; Attendance: 2,000; Referee: Emirjon Sino

8 October 2018 8	Kukësi	0–1	Partizani	Elbasan
17:45 CEST	Dzaria (yellow card) 29'; Shameti (yellow card) 52'; Limaj (yellow card) 80'	Report	Asani (yellow card) 15'; Mala 19'; Hebaj (yellow card) 90'	Stadium: Elbasan Arena; Attendance: 700; Referee: Juxhin Xhaja

21 October 2018 9	Partizani	2–1	Luftëtari	Tirana
17:00 CEST	Mensah 21'; Telushi 55' (pen.); Atanda (yellow card) 67'; Kote (yellow card) 85'	Report	Liçaj (yellow card) 9'; Milosavljev (yellow card) 22'; Shkurti 40'; Ramadani (yellow card) 70'	Stadium: Selman Stërmasi Stadium; Attendance: 1,000; Referee: Kreshnik Cjapi

29 October 2018 10	Partizani	0–2	Skënderbeu	Tirana
19:00 CET	Ibrahimi (yellow card) 20'; Hila (yellow card) 58'; Kote (yellow card) 80'	Report	Radaš (yellow card) 44'; Muzaka 64'; Abazi (yellow card) 86'; Bregu 90+5' (yellow card) 90+5'	Stadium: Selman Stërmasi Stadium; Attendance: 6,000; Referee: Enea Jorgji

3 November 2018 11	Partizani	1–0	Kamza	Tirana
17:00 CET	Ibrahimi (yellow card) 14'; Atanda (yellow card) 42'; Telushi 47'	Report	Fukui (yellow card) 45+2'; Idrizaj (yellow card) 67'	Stadium: Selman Stërmasi Stadium; Attendance: 0 (Note: The match was played behind the doors closed.); Referee: Andi Koçi

7 November 2018 12	Kastrioti	1–2	Partizani	Fushë-Krujë
14:00 CET	Roger 37'; T. Marku (yellow card) 48'; Shehu (yellow card) 73'; Çela (yellow card) 73'	Report	Bardhi 19', 36'	Stadium: Redi Maloku Stadium; Attendance: 1,200; Referee: Orlando Kuka

11 November 2018 13	Partizani	1–0	Laçi	Tirana
17:00 CET	Trashi (yellow card) 53'; Bardhi 62'	Report	Sefgjinaj (yellow card) 38'; Berisha (yellow card) 63' (red card) 83'	Stadium: Selman Stërmasi Stadium; Attendance: 1,200; Referee: Klajdi Kola

23 November 2018 14	Flamurtari	1–0	Partizani	Vlorë
18:00 CET	Bušić 10'; Calé (yellow card) 16'; Alla (yellow card) 84'	Report	Mensah (yellow card) 14'; Hila (yellow card) 16'; Asani (yellow card) 16'	Stadium: Flamurtari Stadium; Attendance: 2,500; Referee: Enea Jorgji

30 November 2018 15	Partizani	2–1	Tirana	Tirana
18:00 CET	Trashi (yellow card) 31'; Ibrahimi (yellow card) 38'; Hebaj 66', 86'	Report	Daja (yellow card) 21'; Hoxhallari (yellow card) 29'; Doka (yellow card) 42'; Halili 50'; Hasani (yellow card) 51'; Kërçiku (yellow card) 90'	Stadium: Selman Stërmasi Stadium; Attendance: 6,000; Referee: Eldorjan Hamiti

8 December 2018 16	Teuta	1–1	Partizani	Durrës
17:00 CET	Gashi 8'	Report	Hila (yellow card) 36'; Belica (yellow card) 52'; Asani 69' (yellow card) 72'	Stadium: Niko Dovana Stadium; Attendance: 3,000; Referee: Klajdi Kola

14 December 2018 17	Partizani	0–0	Kukësi	Tirana
18:00 CET	Telushi (yellow card) 8'; Ibrahimi (yellow card) 23'	Report		Stadium: Selman Stërmasi Stadium; Attendance: 0 (Note: The match was played behind the doors closed.); Referee: Enea Jorgji

23 December 2018 18	Luftëtari	1–1	Partizani	Gjirokastra
13:30 CET	Ramadani (yellow card) 28'; Ymeraj 55' (yellow card) 61'; Ruçi (yellow card) 80'; Aleksi (yellow card) 85'	Report	Mensah (yellow card) 28'; Mala 36' (yellow card) 74'; Bardhi (yellow card) 81'	Stadium: Gjirokastra Stadium; Attendance: 2,000; Referee: Juxhin Xhaja

25 January 2019 19	Skënderbeu	0–1	Partizani	Korçë
18:00 CET	Guedj (yellow card) 26'; Dita (yellow card) 52'; Radaš (yellow card) 52'	Report	Mala 3'; Telushi (yellow card) 45' (penalty missed) 52'; Trashi (red card) 90+5'	Stadium: Skënderbeu Stadium; Attendance: 3,500; Referee: Andi Koçi

3 February 2019 20	Kamza	0–1	Partizani	Kamëz
14:00 CET	Arrabal (yellow card) 52'; Peçi (yellow card) 55'; Bonanni (yellow card) 90'	Report	Rexhepi (yellow card) 28'; Telushi (yellow card) 51'; Asani 56' (yellow card) 90'	Stadium: Kamëz Stadium; Attendance: 1,500; Referee: Klajdi Kola

9 February 2019 21	Partizani	2–0	Kastrioti	Tirana
17:00 CET	Telushi 52'; Bardhi 60'; Ibrahimi (yellow card) 78'	Report	H. Marku (yellow card) 42'; Ndreca (yellow card) 51'; Çela (yellow card) 77'	Stadium: Selman Stërmasi Stadium; Attendance: 3,000; Referee: Kreshnik Cjapi

17 February 2019 22	Laçi	1–0	Partizani	Laç
14:00 CET	Shtubina 12' (pen.); Çokaj (yellow card) 21'; Berisha (yellow card) 52'; Sefgjinaj (yellow card) 90+4'	Report	Asani (yellow card) 12'; Atanda (yellow card) 55'; Duka (yellow card) 84'	Stadium: Laçi Stadium; Attendance: 1,500; Referee: Klajdi Kola

23 February 2019 23	Partizani	3–1	Flamurtari	Tirana
17:00 CET	Bardhi 11'; Trashi (yellow card) 14'; Rexhepi (yellow card) 61'; Hebaj 68', 71'	Report	Liçaj (yellow card) 32'; Ribaj 40' (red card) 45'	Stadium: Selman Stërmasi Stadium; Attendance: 1,500; Referee: Indrit Myrtja

1 March 2019 24	Tirana	0–0	Partizani	Tirana
18:00 CET	Hoxhallari (yellow card) 46'; Turtulli (yellow card) 51'; Ngoo (yellow card) 65'	Report	Duka (yellow card) 28'; Atanda (yellow card) 75'; Kalari (yellow card) 87'; Rexhepi (yellow card) 90'	Stadium: Selman Stërmasi Stadium; Attendance: 8,000; Referee: Enea Jorgji

17 March 2019 (Note: The match was originally scheduled to be played on 8 March, but it was delayed due to the boycott of the Union of Albanian football referees due to insecure conditions at the stadiums.) 25	Partizani	3–0	Teuta	Tirana
17:00 CET	Telushi 5' (yellow card) 6'; Hila 32' (pen.); Rexhepi (yellow card) 67'; Çinari 89' (yellow card) 89'	Report	Progni (yellow card) 25'; Kallaku (yellow card) 31'	Stadium: Selman Stërmasi Stadium; Attendance: 2,000; Referee: Juxhin Xhaja

29 March 2019 26	Kukësi	1–1	Partizani	Shkodër
18:00 CET	Rrumbullaku (yellow card) 26'; Krasniqi (yellow card) 34'; Reginaldo 55'; Teqja (yellow card) 63'	Report	Ibrahimi (yellow card) 26'; Asani 68' (pen.) (yellow card) 68'; Atanda (yellow card) 73'	Stadium: Loro Boriçi Stadium; Attendance: 500; Referee: Enea Jorgji

6 April 2019 27	Partizani	1–3	Luftëtari	Tirana
18:45 CEST	Duka 4'	Report	Dunga 38', 44', 70'; Aleksi (yellow card) 57'; Ymeraj (yellow card) 58'	Stadium: Selman Stërmasi Stadium; Attendance: 1,200; Referee: Klodian Shahini

10 April 2019 28	Partizani	2–0	Skënderbeu	Tirana
18:30 CEST	Belica 26'; Ibrahimi (yellow card) 39'; Hila (yellow card) 42'; Asani 50' (pen.); Trashi (yellow card) 70'	Report	Dita (yellow card) 12'; Sambou (yellow card) 51'; Kurti (yellow card) 89'	Stadium: Selman Stërmasi Stadium; Attendance: 1,500; Referee: Kreshnik Barjamaj

14 April 2019 29	Partizani	3–0; Awarded (Note: The match was awarded due to the exclusion of Kamza.)	Kamza	Tirana
				Stadium: Selman Stërmasi Stadium

20 April 2019 30	Kastrioti	1–1	Partizani	Fushë-Krujë
16:00 CEST	Marku (yellow card) 27'; Shehu 58'	Report	Rexhepi (yellow card) 25'; Mensah (yellow card) 38' (goal) 55'; Atanda (yellow card) 43'; Çinari (yellow card) 90+5'	Stadium: Redi Maloku Stadium; Attendance: 1,200; Referee: Olsid Ferataj

27 April 2019 31	Partizani	1–1	Laçi	Tirana
19:00 CEST	Hoxha (yellow card) 21'; Trashi (yellow card) 24'; Telushi 82' (pen.) (yellow card) 86'	Report	Okpotu (yellow card) 10'; Shtubina 22' (pen.) (yellow card) 75'; Domgjoni (yellow card) 26'; Mersinaj (yellow card) 82'	Stadium: Selman Stërmasi Stadium; Attendance: 1,500; Referee: Emirjon Sino

4 May 2019 32	Flamurtari	0–3	Partizani	Vlorë
15:00 CEST	Kotobelli (yellow card) 45'; Musta (yellow card) 57'	Report	Mensah (yellow card) 21' (goal) 52'; Asani 27'; Ibrahimi (yellow card) 78'; Çinari 89'	Stadium: Flamurtari Stadium; Attendance: 1,000; Referee: Enea Jorgji

12 May 2019 33	Partizani	2–1	Tirana	Tirana
16:30 CEST	Çinari 30', 72' (yellow card) 30'; Ibrahimi (yellow card) 57'; Kalari (yellow card) 90'	Report	Turtulli (yellow card) 23'; Greca 40'; Daja (yellow card) 45'; Ngoo (yellow card) 90+2'	Stadium: Selman Stërmasi Stadium; Attendance: 8,000; Referee: Kridens Meta

18 May 2019 34	Teuta	2–0	Partizani	Durrës
16:30 CEST	Arapi (yellow card) 32'; Progni 34'; Kallaku 52' (pen.); Gashi (yellow card) 78'; Sidibe (red card) 88'	Report	Ferati (yellow card) 50'; Rexhepi (yellow card) 51'	Stadium: Niko Dovana Stadium; Attendance: 500; Referee: Olsid Ferataj

26 May 2019 35	Partizani	1–1	Kukësi	Tirana
16:30 CEST	Hila (yellow card) 26'; Atanda (yellow card) 28'; Asani (yellow card) 76'; Çinari 83'	Report	Rrumbullaku (yellow card) 20'; Reginaldo 47'; Musolli (yellow card) 87'	Stadium: Selman Stërmasi Stadium; Attendance: 5,000; Referee: Eldorjan Hamiti

30 May 2019 36	Luftëtari	1–1	Partizani	Gjirokastra
16:00 CEST	Chanti 9'; Ramadani (yellow card) 55'	Report	Noka (yellow card) 25'; Çinari 90+3'	Stadium: Gjirokastra Stadium; Attendance: 400; Referee: Orlando Kuka

=== Albanian Cup ===
==== First round ====
12 September 2018 First leg	Tërbuni	0–1	Partizani	Pukë
16:00 CEST	Myrta (yellow card) 32'	Report	Çinari 6' (yellow card) 33'; Hila (yellow card) 85'	Stadium: Ismail Xhemali Stadium; Attendance: 350; Referee: Elton Hazizaj

25 September 2018 Second leg	Partizani	4–0 (5–0 agg.)	Tërbuni	Pezë Helmës
15:30 CEST	Çinari 16', 39' (yellow card) 73'; Bardhi 29'; Hysenaj (yellow card) 76'; Hebaj 82'; Kodra (yellow card) 88'	Report	Xhuveli (yellow card) 38'; Meshaj (yellow card) 67'; Isaraj (yellow card) 73'	Stadium: Internacional Complex; Attendance: 50; Referee: Erik Kaso

==== Second round ====
22 January 2019 First leg	Kastrioti	2–4	Partizani	Fushë-Krujë
14:00 CET	Vatnikaj 13'; Shehu 71'	Report	Hebaj 31', 75'; Mensah 42'; Trashi 70'	Stadium: Redi Maloku Stadium; Referee: Olsid Ferataj

6 February 2019 Second leg	Partizani	3–0 (7–2 agg.)	Kastrioti	Tirana
13:30 CET	Hebaj 34'; Mensah 60'; Çinari 64'	Report		Stadium: Selman Stërmasi Stadium; Attendance: 300; Referee: Klodian Shahini

==== Quarter-finals ====
12 March 2019 First leg	Partizani	1–2	Luftëtari	Elbasan
14:00 CET	Telushi 42'	Report	Fili 54' (yellow card) 84'; Hoxha 90'	Stadium: Elbasan Arena; Attendance: 0 (Note: The match was played behind the doors closed.); Referee: Klodian Shahini

3 April 2019 Second leg	Luftëtari	1–0 (3–1 agg.)	Partizani	Gjirokastra
14:00 CEST	Dunga 34' (pen.); Demo (yellow card) 46'; Açka (yellow card) 90+4'	Report	Asani (yellow card) 55'; Atanda (yellow card) 90+3'	Stadium: Gjirokastra Stadium; Attendance: 700; Referee: Eldorjan Hamiti

=== UEFA Europa League ===
==== First qualifying round ====
12 July 2018 First leg	Partizani (Albania)	0–1	(Slovenia) Maribor	Tirana, Albania
17:30	Trashi (yellow card) 48'	Report	Bajde 50'; Dervišević (yellow card) 56'	Stadium: Selman Stërmasi Stadium; Attendance: 1,050; Referee: Jérôme Brisard (France)

19 July 2018 Second leg	Maribor (Slovenia)	2–0 (3–0 agg.)	(Albania) Partizani	Maribor, Slovenia
20:15	Dervišević 31'; Tavares 90+3'	Report		Stadium: Ljudski vrt Attendance: 6,876; Referee: Paul Tierney (England)

== Statistics ==
=== Top scorers ===
No.	Pos.	Nation	Name	Kategoria Superiore	Europa League	Albanian Cup	Total
7	FW	(Albania)	Eraldo Çinari	6	0	4	10
9	FW	(Albania)	Rubin Hebaj	4	0	4	8
10	MF	(Albania)	Jasir Asani	8	0	0	8
17	MF	(Albania)	Bruno Telushi	7	0	1	8
90	FW	(Ghana)	Emmanuel Mensah	5	0	2	7
11	MF	(Albania)	Jurgen Bardhi	5	0	1	6
20	MF	(Albania)	Esat Mala	4	0	0	4
2	DF	(North Macedonia)	Egzon Belica	1	0	0	1
19	MF	(Albania)	Ardit Hila	1	0	0	1
23	MF	(United States)	Dilly Duka	1	0	0	1
27	MF	(Albania)	Lorenc Trashi	0	0	1	1
#	Own goals			0	0	0	0
TOTAL				41 (Note: Partizani won match by a 3–0 walkover against Kamza as the team was banned from the championship.)	0	13	51

Last updated: 4 May 2019

=== Clean sheets ===
The list is sorted by shirt number when total appearances are equal.

Rnk	No.	Player	Kategoria Superiore	Europa League	Albanian Cup	Total
1	12	(Albania) Alban Hoxha	17	0	0	17
2	1	(Albania) Dashamir Xhika	0	0	3	3
TOTALS			17	0	3	20 (Note: Partizani won match by a 3–0 walkover against Kamza as the team was banned from the championship.)

Last updated: 4 May 2019
