= 2020–21 FK Partizani Tirana season =

Partizani Tirana
2020–21 season
- President: Gazmend Demi
- Head coach: Ilir Daja
- Stadium: Arena Kombëtare; Elbasan Arena
- Kategoria Superiore: 6th
- Albanian Cup: Quarter-finals
- Top goalscorer: League: Jasir Asani (9); All: Jasir Asani (10)
Home colours	Away colours	Third colours

In the 2020–21 season, Partizani Tirana competed in the Kategoria Superiore for the eighth consecutive season.

== First-team squad ==
Squad at end of season

Note: Flags indicate national team as defined under FIFA eligibility rules; some limited exceptions apply. Players may hold more than one non-FIFA nationality.

No.	Pos.	Nation	Player
1	GK	ALB	Livio Malaj
2	DF	MKD	Egzon Belica
3	DF	ALB	Anteo Osmanllari
3	DF	ESA	Roberto Domínguez
4	MF	KOS	Rron Broja
7	FW	ALB	Eraldo Çinari
8	MF	ALB	Donald Mëllugja
11	MF	ALB	Jurgen Bardhi
12	GK	ALB	Alban Hoxha (captain)
15	DF	KOS	Loti Celina
17	MF	ALB	Gehard Hasa
18	MF	BRA	Stênio Júnior
20	MF	ALB	Esat Mala
21	MF	ALB	Valentino Murataj

No.	Pos.	Nation	Player
22	FW	ALB	Tedi Cara
23	DF	ALB	Esin Hakaj
24	MF	MKD	Ferhan Hasani
26	MF	BRA	William Cordeiro
28	DF	ALB	Hektor Idrizaj
29	FW	ALB	Franc Marinaj
31	MF	ALB	Eneid Kodra
33	DF	ALB	Denis Balla
35	FW	ALB	Kevi Llanaj
36	DF	ALB	Eneo Bitri
38	MF	ALB	Kristi Kote
44	FW	BRA	Lucas Cardoso
77	GK	ALB	Aldo Teqja
90	FW	ALB	Jasir Asani

== Competitions ==
=== Overview ===
Competition	First match	Last match	Starting round	Final position	Record							
Competition	First match	Last match	Starting round	Final position	Pld	W	D	L	GF	GA	GD	Win %
Kategoria Superiore	4 November 2020	26 May 2021	Matchday 1	3rd	36	17	14	5	53	23	+30	47.22
Albanian Cup	1 November 2020	17 March 2021	First round	Quarter-finals	3	2	1	0	6	0	+6	66.67
Total					39	19	15	5	59	23	+36	48.72

Last updated: 26 May 2021
Source: Competitions

=== Kategoria Superiore ===
==== League table ====
Pos	Team	Pld	W	D	L	GF	GA	GD	Pts	Qualification or relegation
1	Teuta (C)	36	17	15	4	42	16	+26	66	Qualification for the Champions League first qualifying round
2	Vllaznia	36	19	9	8	44	22	+22	66	Qualification for the Europa Conference League first qualifying round (Note: Vllaznia, the winners of the 2020–21 Albanian Cup, already qualified for European competition based on league position. Therefore, the Europa Conference League berth awarded to the Albanian Cup winners transfers to the fourth-placed team.)
3	Partizani	36	17	14	5	53	23	+30	65	Qualification for the Europa Conference League first qualifying round
4	Laçi	36	16	13	7	41	26	+15	61	Qualification for the Europa Conference League first qualifying round
5	Tirana	36	15	13	8	41	26	+15	58	

Source: Albanian Football Association, Soccerway
Rules for classification: 1) Points; 2) Head-to-head points; 3) Head-to-head goal difference; 4) Head-to-head goals scored; 5) Goal difference; 6) Goals scored; 7) Draw.
(C) Champions

==== Results summary ====
Overall								Home						Away					
Pld	W	D	L	GF	GA	GD	Pts	W	D	L	GF	GA	GD	W	D	L	GF	GA	GD
36	17	14	5	53	23	+30	65	8	8	2	24	6	+18	9	6	3	29	17	+12

Last updated: 26 May 2021.
Source: Competitive matches

==== Results by round ====
Round	1	2	3	4	5	6	7	8	9	10	11	12	13	14	15	16	17	18	19	20	21	22	23	24	25	26	27	28	29	30	31	32	33	34	35	36
Ground	A	A	H	A	H	A	H	A	H	H	H	A	H	A	H	A	H	A	A	A	H	A	H	A	H	A	H	H	H	A	H	A	H	A	H	A
Result	L	W	D	W	W	D	D	L	D	W	W	L	D	W	W	D	D	W	W	W	D	D	L	W	D	D	W	W	W	D	W	D	D	W	L	W
Position	4	4	4	3	1	2	3	3	5	3	2	3	3	2	2	2	2	2	2	2	2	4	4	4	3	4	3	3	2	2	1	2	2	1	3	3

Updated to match(es) played on 26 May 2021. Source: Competitive matches
A = Away; H = Home; W = Win; D = Draw; L = Loss

==== Matches ====
4 November 2020 1	Kastrioti	2–1	Partizani	Kamëz
13:45 CET	Devid 20'; Rezi 86'	Report	Asani 64' (pen.)	Stadium: Kamëz Stadium; Referee: Olsid Ferataj

8 November 2020 2	Kukësi	0–2	Partizani	Shkodër
13:45 CET		Report	Lucas 60'; Solomon 89'	Stadium: Loro Boriçi Stadium; Referee: Kreshnik Barjamaj

21 November 2020 3	Partizani	0–0	Laçi	Elbasan
16:45 CET		Report		Stadium: Elbasan Arena; Referee: Eldorjan Hamiti

25 November 2020 4	Apolonia	0–3	Partizani	Fier
13:45 CET		Report	Bitri 41'; Bardhi 58'; Idrizaj 80'	Stadium: Loni Papuçiu Stadium; Referee: Blerim Ziri

29 November 2020 5	Partizani	4–0	Skënderbeu	Elbasan
16:45 CET	Bardhi 7'; Mala 21'; Lucas 45+1'; Solomon 70'	Report		Stadium: Elbasan Arena; Referee: Olsid Ferataj

4 December 2020 6	Tirana	0–0	Partizani	Tirana
18:00 CET		Report		Stadium: Arena Kombëtare; Referee: Juxhin Xhaja

9 December 2020 7	Partizani	0–0	Teuta	Elbasan
16:45 CET		Report		Stadium: Elbasan Arena; Referee: Kreshnik Barjamaj

13 December 2020 8	Vllaznia	1–0	Partizani	Shkodër
16:45 CET	Dilaver 87'	Report		Stadium: Loro Boriçi Stadium; Referee: Roxhers Muska

19 December 2020 9	Partizani	0–0	Bylis	Elbasan
16:45 CET		Report		Stadium: Elbasan Arena; Referee: Kreshnik Cjapi

23 December 2020 10	Partizani	2–0	Kastrioti	Tirana
13:45 CET	Cara 86'; Asani 90+4' (pen.)	Report		Stadium: Selman Stërmasi Stadium; Referee: Enea Jorgji

27 December 2020 11	Partizani	4–1	Kukësi	Elbasan
16:45 CET	Asani 38'; Bitri 48'; Bardhi 69'; Mala 79' (pen.)	Report	Ibraimi 90+1' (pen.)	Stadium: Elbasan Arena; Referee: Kridens Meta

30 December 2020 12	Laçi	3–2	Partizani	Laç
13:45 CET	Harmon 8'; Mazrekaj 52', 68'	Report	Cara 10'; Hyseni 90+3'	Stadium: Laçi Stadium; Referee: Olsid Ferataj

9 January 2021 13	Partizani	1–1	Apolonia	Elbasan
16:45 CET	Cara 81'	Report	Zaimaj 90+6' (pen.)	Stadium: Elbasan Arena; Referee: Roxhers Muska

16 January 2021 14	Skënderbeu	1–2	Partizani	Korçë
13:45 CET	Mensah 65'	Report	Bardhi 3'; Solomon 7'	Stadium: Skënderbeu Stadium; Referee: Kreshnik Cjapi

21 January 2021 15	Partizani	1–0	Tirana	Elbasan
18:00 CET	Çinari 83'	Report		Stadium: Elbasan Arena; Referee: Enea Jorgji

25 January 2021 16	Teuta	1–1	Partizani	Durrës
16:45 CET	Krasniqi 37'	Report	Asani 8'	Stadium: Niko Dovana Stadium; Referee: Kreshnik Cjapi

31 January 2021 17	Partizani	0–0	Vllaznia	Elbasan
16:45 CET		Report		Stadium: Elbasan Arena; Referee: Eldorjan Hamiti

6 February 2021 18	Bylis	1–2	Partizani	Ballsh
13:45 CET	Carkanji 86'	Report	Çinari 56' (pen.); Cara 81'	Stadium: Adush Muça Stadium; Referee: Enea Jorgji

13 February 2021 19	Kastrioti	0–3	Partizani	Kamëz
14:00 CET		Report	Júnior 65'; Asani 77'; Lucas 83'	Stadium: Kamëz Stadium; Referee: Indrit Myrtja

21 February 2021 20	Kukësi	1–2	Partizani	Elbasan
16:00 CET	Limaj 90'	Report	Çinari 63'; Murataj 88'	Stadium: Elbasan Arena; Referee: Kreshnik Cjapi

27 February 2021 21	Partizani	1–1	Laçi	Elbasan
16:00 CET	Çinari 45'	Report	Harmon 64'	Stadium: Elbasan Arena; Referee: Kridens Meta

3 March 2021 22	Apolonia	1–1	Partizani	Fier
13:00 CET	Hakaj 24' (o.g.)	Report	Lucas 76'	Stadium: Loni Papuçiu Stadium; Referee: Andi Koçi

7 March 2021 23	Partizani	0–1	Skënderbeu	Elbasan
16:00 CET		Report	Jean Victor 67'	Stadium: Elbasan Arena; Referee: Enea Jorgji

13 March 2021 24	Tirana	1–2	Partizani	Tirana
13:00 CET	Hoxhallari 39'	Report	Belica 29'; Bardhi 59'	Stadium: Selman Stërmasi Stadium; Referee: Kreshnik Cjapi

21 March 2021 25	Partizani	0–0	Teuta	Elbasan
16:00 CET		Report		Stadium: Elbasan Arena; Referee: Enea Jorgji

3 April 2021 26	Vllaznia	0–0	Partizani	Shkodër
16:00 CEST		Report		Stadium: Loro Boriçi Stadium; Referee: Enea Jorgji

11 April 2021 27	Partizani	3–0	Bylis	Tirana
16:00 CEST	Júnior 1'; Asani 69'; Çinari 84'	Report		Stadium: Arena Kombëtare; Referee: Florjan Lata

17 April 2021 28	Partizani	3–1	Kastrioti	Tirana
16:00 CEST	Hakaj 31'; Júnior 75'; Asani 85'	Report	Daci 4'	Stadium: Arena Kombëtare; Referee: Erjon Bastari

24 April 2021 29	Partizani	4–0	Kukësi	Tirana
16:00 CEST	Asani 39'; Çinari 41'; Júnior 67'; Mala 87'	Report		Stadium: Arena Kombëtare; Referee: Juxhin Xhaja

28 April 2021 30	Laçi	2–2	Partizani	Laç
16:00 CEST	Musta 18'; Shehu 57'	Report	Çinari 8'; Júnior 80'	Stadium: Laçi Stadium; Referee: Eldorjan Hamiti

3 May 2021 31	Partizani	1–0	Apolonia	Elbasan
18:00 CEST	Asani 76'	Report		Stadium: Elbasan Arena; Referee: Florjan Lata

8 May 2021 32	Skënderbeu	1–1	Partizani	Korçë
19:00 CEST	Mensah 56'	Report	Júnior 44'	Stadium: Skënderbeu Stadium

13 May 2021 33	Partizani	0–0	Tirana	Tirana
19:00 CEST		Report		Stadium: Arena Kombëtare; Referee: Eldorjan Hamiti

17 May 2021 34	Teuta	0–1	Partizani	Durrës
17:00 CEST		Report	Çinari 24'	Stadium: Niko Dovana Stadium; Referee: Olsid Ferataj

21 May 2021 35	Partizani	0–1	Vllaznia	Tirana
17:00 CEST		Report	Marku 74' (pen.)	Stadium: Arena Kombëtare; Referee: Enea Jorgji

26 May 2021 36	Bylis	2–4	Partizani	Ballsh
17:00 CEST	Spahiu 25'; Anthony 70' (pen.)	Report	Cara 34'; Lucas 62'; Selita 89'; Mala 90+2'	Stadium: Adush Muça Stadium; Referee: Kreshnik Cjapi

=== Albanian Cup ===
==== First round ====
1 November 2020	Partizani	5−0	Iliria	Librazhd
13:30 CET	Solomon 22', 57'; Asani 38' (pen.); Broja 52'; Cordeiro 68'	Report		Stadium: Sopoti Stadium; Referee: Silvio Dyrmishi

==== Second round ====
12 November 2020	Partizani	1–0	Apolonia	Pogradec
13:30 CET	Brown 19'	Report		Stadium: Gjorgji Kyçyku Stadium; Referee: Blerim Ziri

==== Quarter-finals ====
17 March 2021	Laçi	0−0 (a.e.t.) (4−3 p)	Partizani	Laç
13:00 CET		Report		Stadium: Laçi Stadium; Referee: Kridens Meta
	Penalties
	Shehu (penalty scored); Musta (penalty missed); Deliu (penalty scored); Ignjatović (penalty scored); Mazrekaj (penalty scored)		(penalty scored) Çinari; (penalty scored) Mala; (penalty missed) Bardhi; (penalty missed) Cara; (penalty scored) Murataj
