= 2019 Albanian Supercup =

Partizani	Kukësi
4	2
- After extra time
- Date: 18 August 2019
- Venue: Elbasan Arena, Elbasan
- Referee: Eldorjan Hamiti

The 2019 Albanian Supercup was the 26th edition of the Albanian Supercup, an annual Albanian football match. The teams were decided by taking the winner of the previous season's Albanian Superliga and the runner-up of the Albanian Cup.

The match was contested by Partizani, champions of the 2018–19 Albanian Superliga, and Kukësi, the 2018–19 Albanian Cup winner.

== Details ==
18 August 2019
19:00 CEST

Partizani	4−2 (a.e.t.)	Kukësi
Mala 5'; Brown 88', 94', 99'	Report	Musta 35', 56'

Elbasan Arena, Elbasan
Attendance: 400
Referee: Eldorjan Hamiti

Partizani Tirana	Kukësi

GK	12	(Albania) Alban Hoxha (c)
RB	2	(North Macedonia) Egzon Belica
CB	5	(Romania) Deian Boldor
CB	33	(Albania) Eneo Bitri
LB	19	(Albania) Lorenc Trashi
DM	26	(Brazil) William Cordeiro		(substituted off) 77'
RW	10	(North Macedonia) Jasir Asani		(substituted off) 49'
CM	4	(Kosovo) Rron Broja
CM	20	(Albania) Esat Mala	(yellow card) 32'	(substituted off) 103'
LW	17	(Albania) Bruno Telushi	(yellow card) 36'
CF	9	(Nigeria) Theophilus Solomon		(substituted off) 57'
Substitutes:
GK	77	(Albania) Aldo Teqja
DF	23	(Albania) Esin Hakaj
MF	8	(Venezuela) Aristóteles Romero	(yellow card) 109'	(substituted on) 103'
MF	24	(North Macedonia) Besnik Ferati
MF	38	(Albania) Kristi Kote
FW	7	(Albania) Eraldo Çinari	(yellow card) 111'	(substituted on) 77'
FW	11	(Albania) Jurgen Bardhi		(substituted on) 49'
FW	66	(Ghana) Joseph Ekuban
FW	99	(Jamaica) Brian Brown		(substituted on) 57'
Manager:
(Italy) Franco Lerda

GK	90	(Kosovo) Ilir Avdyli
CB	15	(Albania) Blerim Kotobelli	(yellow card) 28'
CB	21	(Albania) Olsi Teqja	(yellow card) 60'
CB	24	(North Macedonia) Edis Maliqi	(yellow card) 43'
DM	8	(Germany) Vesel Limaj
DM	29	(Albania) Emiljano Musta
RM	7	(Albania) Enis Gavazaj		(substituted off) 83'
AM	23	(Kosovo) Besar Musolli (c)	(yellow card) 109'
LM	11	(Albania) Valon Ethemi
CF	10	(Albania) Eduard Rroca		(substituted off) 46'
CF	9	(Albania) Vasil Shkurti		(substituted off) 66'
Substitutes:
GK	12	(Albania) Dashamir Xhika
DF	3	(North Macedonia) Tome Kitanovski		(substituted on) 105'
DF	32	(Albania) Bruno Lulaj		(substituted on) 46'
MF	18	(Albania) Toni Selimi
MF	88	(Guinea) Oumar Camara
FW	19	(Kosovo) Mirlind Daku	(yellow card) 85'	(substituted on) 66'
FW	27	(Albania) Fluturim Domi
FW	70	(Chameria) Marko Çema		(substituted on) 83' (substituted off) 105'
Manager:
(Albania) Shpëtim Duro

Match officials:
Assistant referees:
Ilir Tartari (Albania)
Nertil Bregasi (Albania)
Fourth official:
Ridiger Çokaj (Albania)

Match rules

- 90 minutes
- 30 minutes extra-time if the scores still level
- Penalty shoot-out if scores still level
- Six named substitutes, of which three may be used and additional fourth if extra-time is played

== See also ==
- 2018–19 Albanian Superliga
- 2018–19 Albanian Cup
