= Stivian Janku =

Albanian footballer

Personal information
- Date of birth: 23 June 1997 (age 29)
- Place of birth: Ioannina, Greece
- Height: 1.91 m (6 ft 3 in)
- Position: Defender

Team information
- Current team: Besëlidhja
- Number: 23

Youth career
- 2012–2016: Delvina
- 2015–2016: Partizani B

Senior career*
Years	Team	Apps	(Gls)
2016–2017	Partizani	0	(0)
2017–2019	Luftëtari	4	(0)
2018–2019	→ Bylis (loan)	14	(2)
2019–2023	Bylis	94	(4)
2023–2024	Egnatia	7	(0)
2024	Dinamo Tirana	5	(0)
2024–2025	Feronikeli	15	(1)
2025–2026	Flamurtari	15	(0)
2026–	Besëlidhja	0	(0)

International career
2022–	Albania	2	(0)
- * Club domestic league appearances and goals as of 6 March 2026

Stivian Janku (born 23 June 1997) is a footballer who currently plays for Besëlidhja. Born in Greece, he plays for the Albania national team.

== Club career ==
=== Luftëtari Gjirokastër ===
Janku made his Albanian Superliga debut on 20 November 2017 in a 1–1 home draw with KF Laçi. He was subbed on for Eri Lamçja in the 85th minute.

=== Bylis Ballsh (loan) ===
In August 2018, Janku was loaned out to Albanian First Division club KF Bylis Ballsh. He made his league debut for the club on 3 November 2018 in a 2–1 away victory over Tomori Berat, coming on as a 66th-minute substitute for Odirah Ntephe.

== Personal life ==
Stanku was born in Ioannina to ethnic Albanian parents from Delvinë.
