= Bruno Lulaj =

Albanian footballer (born 1985)

Personal information
- Date of birth: 2 April 1995 (age 31)
- Place of birth: Piraeus, Greece
- Height: 1.85 m (6 ft 1 in)
- Position: Centre-back

Team information
- Current team: Elbasani
- Number: 4

Youth career
- 2008–2014: Panionios

Senior career*
Years	Team	Apps	(Gls)
2014–2019	Skënderbeu	20	(0)
2016–2017	→ Laçi (loan)	29	(2)
2018–2019	→ Laçi (loan)	17	(1)
2019–2022	Kukësi	91	(4)
2022–2024	Tirana	48	(4)
2024–	Elbasani	52	(1)

International career
2013–2014	Albania U19	4	(0)
2014–2016	Albania U21	14	(0)
- * Club domestic league appearances and goals as of 24 June 2026

Bruno Lulaj (born 2 April 1995) is an Albanian professional footballer who plays as a centre-back for AF Elbasani. Born in Greece, he has represented Albania at under-19 and under-21 level.

== Club career ==
=== Skënderbeu Korçë ===
He joined reigning Albanian champions Skënderbeu Korçë on a season-long loan from Panionios on 20 August 2014.

He scored on his professional debut in an Albanian Cup game against Himara on 1 October 2014, in a game that finished 10–1 to Skënderbeu, which was the first time the club has scored 10 goals or more in their history. Lulaj started the game at centre back alongside Bajram Jashanica and he scored in the 10th minute to make it 2–0 for Skënderbeu in the historic 10–1 victory.

Lulaj made his league debut on 13 December 2014 in an away game against Tirana, where he came on as a 55th-minute substitute for Tefik Osmani in the 2–0 loss.

==== 2016–17 season: Loan at Laçi ====
On 1 September 2016, Lulaj along with his teammate Paolo Ivani were sent on loan to fellow Albanian Superliga side Laçi until the end of 2016–17 season. He was allocated squad number 4, and made his club debut six days later in the opening league match against Korabi Peshkopi, finished in a goalless draw. He scored his first goal of the season on 17 October in the matchday 7 against Vllaznia Shkodër, helping Laçi to take the first league win of the season after three draws and three defeats. The strike was followed by another one five days later in the match against Flamurtari Vlorë, securing his side a point. After initially returning to Skënderbeu for their preparation phase in Turkey in January 2017, Lulaj returned to Laçi in February for the second part of the season. Lulaj finished his spell at Laçi by making 30 appearances, including 29 in league, collecting 2518 minutes on the field as Laçi barely escaped relegation. He returned to Skënderbeu following the end of the season. Lulaj dubbed his time in Laç as an "unforgettable experience".

==== 2017–18 season: Second loan to Laçi ====
In June 2017, Lulaj returned to Skënderbeu. He was included in Ilir Daja's team for the 2017–18 UEFA Europa League qualifying rounds. Lulaj played his first match since the return on 5 October, netting a goal in the returning leg of 2017–18 Albanian Cup against Adriatiku Mamurras. The match finished in a 9–1 win for Skënderbeu, who progressed to the next round 17–1 on aggregate.

In January 2018, Lulaj was sent on loan to Laçi for the remainder of the 2017–18 season. He made his 50th Albanian Superliga appearance on 5 May in the home fixture against parent club Skënderbeu Korçë, netting his team's first goal in an eventual 3–2 comeback win.

==== 2018–19 season ====
Lulaj returned to Skënderbeu in the first days of July 2018. He began the season by winning the 2018 Albanian Supercup against his former team Laçi, entering as a substitute in the last 14 minutes.

In the 2018–19 Albanian Superliga season, he made only 12 appearances, collecting only 482 minutes, which prompted him to make a transfer request at the end of the campaign.

=== Kukësi ===
On 18 June 2019, Lulaj was presented as the new player of Kukësi by penning a contract running out until June 2021. He made his debut on 18 August in the 2019 Albanian Supercup match against Partizani Tirana, entering as a second-half substitute in an eventual 4–2 extra-time loss.

Five days later, Lulaj made his league debut in the season opener against the same opponent at Elbasan Arena, with Kukësi winning 1–0; in the 62nd minute, however, he received a straight red card after a confrontation with opposite striker Theophilus Solomon, who was also sent off. In an interview later, Lulaj admitted that he reacted wrongly, adding that the red card was fair for both him and Solomon. As a result of this, Lulaj missed the second league match against Flamurtari Vlorë.

=== Tirana ===
On 31 August 2022, Tirana announced that it had signed with Lulaj on a three-year contract.

Following the end of the 2023–24 season, Lulaj was released by the club along with several other players, becoming a free agent in the process.

== International career ==
=== Youth ===
Lulaj received his first Albania under-21 call by manager Skënder Gega for the friendly versus Italy on 6 May 2014. He was later part of Albania squad in the 2017 UEFA European Under-21 Championship qualifying campaign, playing 9 matches as centre-back, partnering Herdi Prenga.

He made his competitive debut on 28 March 2015 in the first match against Liechtenstein, which was won 0–2 by Lulaj's side. Albania eventually finished 4th in Group 4, collecting 12 points from 10 matches, failing to secure a spot to final tournament. Lulaj finished his under-21 career by making 14 appearances, 9 in competitive matches and 5 in friendlies.

== Career statistics ==
As of 23 August 2019

Club statistics
Club	Season	League			Cup		Europe		Other		Total	
Club	Season	Division	Apps	Goals	Apps	Goals	Apps	Goals	Apps	Goals	Apps	Goals
Skënderbeu Korçë	2014–15	Albanian Superliga	3	0	3	2	—		—		6	2
Skënderbeu Korçë	2015–16	Albanian Superliga	2	0	3	0	0	0	1 (Note: Appearance in Albanian Supercup)	0	6	0
Skënderbeu Korçë	2016–17	Albanian Superliga	—		—		—		0	0	0	0
Skënderbeu Korçë	2017–18	Albanian Superliga	3	0	3	1	0	0	—		6	1
Skënderbeu Korçë	2018–19	Albanian Superliga	12	0	2	0	—		1	0	15	0
Skënderbeu Korçë	Total		20	0	11	3	0	0	2	0	33	3
Skënderbeu Korçë B	2015–16	Albanian Third Division	2	1	—		—		—		2	1
Laçi (loan)	2016–17	Albanian Superliga	29	2	1	0	—		—		30	2
Laçi (loan)	2017–18	Albanian Superliga	17	1	3	0	—		—		20	1
Laçi (loan)	Total		46	3	4	0	—		—		50	3
Kukësi	2019–20	Albanian Superliga	1	0	0	0	0	0	1	0	2	0
Career total			69	4	15	3	0	0	3	0	87	8

== Honours ==
Skënderbeu Korçë

- Albanian Superliga: 2014–15, 2015–16
- Albanian Supercup: 2018

Tirana

- Abissnet Superiore
  - Runner-up: 2022–23
- Kupa e Shqipërisë
  - Runner-up:2022–23
- Albanian Supercup: 2022
