= FK Partizani Tirana B =

Albanian football club

- Full name: Futboll Klub Partizani Tirana B
- Short name: Partizani B
- Founded: February 4, 2013; 13 years ago 2024; 2 years ago (refounded)
- Ground: Arena e Demave
- Capacity: 4,500
- Chairman: Gazmend Demi
- Coach: Alfred Deliallisi
- League: Kategoria e Dytë, Group B
- 2025–26: Kategoria e Dytë, Group B, 4th
- Website: http://partizani.al/sq
Home colours	Away colours

KF Partizani B is the B team of Albanian football club Partizani.

== History ==
=== Partizani reserves (1948–1949) ===
On 3 October 1948, the Albanian Football Association launched a new format for the Albanian Superliga and Albanian First Division as they adopted the western format of an autumn to spring league competition. A reserve team representing Partizani Tirana was created following this announcement, and they competed in 1948–49 Albanian First Division, where they won their first 5 games in a row before the competition was cancelled on 31 March 1949 by the Albanian Football Association due to Soviet pressure to leave the western format and return to the Soviet league format. The league was cancelled with Partizani Tiranë B in 1st place out of 8 teams and Partizani dissolved their reserve team soon after, as they finished with a record of 5 wins out 5 and a goalscoring record of 25 scored and 5 conceded.

=== FC Nacional (2003–2004) ===
In 2003, Partizani took over local side FC Nacional Tiranë and used it as a reserve side in the 2003–04 Albanian Second Division.

=== Partizani B (2013–present) ===
On 15 March 2013, Partizani B defeated IDS Tirana 8–1 away from home in an Albanian Third Division Group B game, making it the club's biggest ever victory. However, this record was broken a couple of months later on 1 May against FK Gostima in a 13–2 victory again away from home. FK Partizani B gained promotion to the Albanian Second Division

During the 2015–16 campaign in the Albanian Second Division, Partizani B began the season inconsistently, winning just 6 of their first 14 games before going on to win 7 of their last 8 games, ending the season on a 16-game unbeaten run which earned them a runners up sport in Group A of the Second Division and a place in the Albanian First Division playoffs. They faced the First Division Group A second bottom side Sopoti Librazhd in the playoff which was original scheduled for 19 May 2016 at the Niko Dovana Stadium in Durrës but was later moved to the Elbasan Arena in Elbasan, where the game ended in a 4–1 win for Partizani B following goals from Lauren Ismailaj, Jurgen Vatnikaj and a brace from Ardit Jaupaj. Partizani B won the game and celebrated promotion to the First Division, but Sopoti Librazhd filed a complaint to the Albanian Football Association arguing that Patizani B had mainly used players from the Partizani first team, including Labinot Ibrahimi and Ylber Ramadani who had featured in the first team against Teuta Durrës the day before. The Albanian FA decided to revoke Partizani B's promotion as they awarded the game to Sopoti Librazhd 3–0 due to Partizani B having broken the rules by featuring Ibrahimi and Ramadani, as a player is not allowed to feature for both the first and reserve team of any club within 24 hours. However, due to stricter licensing measured enforced by the Albanian FA, First Division side Adriatiku Mamurras failed to meet the conditions to remain in the league and their place was given to Partizani B who were able to meet the necessary criteria, making them the only reserve team to have competed in the second tier of modern Albanian football.

== Current squad ==
As of 1 February 2021

Note: Flags indicate national team as defined under FIFA eligibility rules; some limited exceptions apply. Players may hold more than one non-FIFA nationality.

No.	Pos.	Nation	Player
1	GK	ALB	Leonid Varfi
2	MF	ALB	Geri Selita
3	FW	ALB	Franc Marinaj
3	DF	KOS	Loti Celina
4	MF	ALB	Endi Rahmani
5	DF	ALB	Florian Peqini
6	DF	ALB	Vilford Arbana
7	MF	ALB	Leonidha Qyra
8	MF	ALB	Kevi Llanaj
9	FW	ALB	Odeon Bërdufi
10	FW	ALB	Redi Veriu
11	DF	ALB	Enton Allmeta
12	GK	ALB	Livio Malaj
14	MF	ALB	Donald Mëllugja
14	FW	ALB	Fernando Ndrejaj
16	MF	ALB	Xhulio Trimi
16	DF	ALB	Skënder Qato

No.	Pos.	Nation	Player
17	MF	ALB	Nilsen Gjinaj
18	FW	ALB	Igli Gjeçi
19	DF	ALB	Franci Lala
20	MF	ALB	Eneid Kodra
22	FW	ALB	Klahos Zani
23	MF	ALB	Gehard Hasa
23	MF	ALB	Kristi Kote
23	DF	ALB	Anteo Osmanllari
31	FW	BRA	Lucas Cardoso
31	MF	ALB	Enea Rexhepi
36	MF	ALB	Denis Balla
77	FW	ALB	Marko Çema
77	GK	ALB	Aldo Teqja
98	GK	ALB	Holger Xhameta
—	MF	ALB	Glejdis Ndraxhi
—	FW	SYR	Mohanad Mando

== List of managers ==
- (Albania) Dritan Mehmeti (1 Jul 2020– 30 Jun 2021)
- (Albania) Renaldo Kalari (1 Jul 2024– 30 Jun 2025)
- (Albania) Oltijon Kernaja (27 Jul 2025– 12 Oct 2025)
- (Albania) Realf Zhivanaj (17 Oct 2025 – 12 Dec 2025)
- (Albania) Ergys Luga (12 Dec 2025– 1 Jun 2026)
- (Albania) Alfred Deliallisi (12 Jul 2026– )

== Honours ==
- Kategoria e Dytë
  - 2002–03
- Kategoria e Tretë
  - 2012–13

== Staff ==
- President: Gazment Demi
- Manager: Marko Pelinxhi
- Assistant manager:Shahin Berberi
- Academy director: Genc Tomori
- Under 17s manager: Nikolin Çoçlli
- Under 12s manager: Evis Çelmeta
- Head scout: Ilir Bushati
