= Odeon Bërdufi =

Albanian footballer

Personal information
- Date of birth: 20 October 1990 (age 36)
- Place of birth: Tirana, Albania
- Position: Forward

Youth career
- –2009: Dinamo Tirana

Senior career*
Years	Team	Apps	(Gls)
2009–2010	Dinamo Tirana	6	(0)
2010–2011	→ Adriatiku (loan)		
2011–2012	Kukësi	1	(0)
2014	Laçi		
2014–2015	Iliria	3	(0)
2015–2016	Sopoti	35	(6)
2016–2017	Turbina	23	(8)
2017–2018	Burreli	8	(0)
2018–2019	Vora	11	(0)
2019	Turbina	12	(3)
2019–2021	Partizani B		
2021–2022	Korabi	2	(1)
- * Club domestic league appearances and goals as of 21:20, 17 February 2022 (UTC)

Odeon Bërdufi (born 20 October 1990) is an Albanian footballer who plays as a forward.
