= Deian Boldor =

Romanian footballer (born 1995)

Personal information
- Date of birth: 3 February 1995 (age 31)
- Place of birth: Timișoara, Romania
- Height: 1.89 m (6 ft 2 in)
- Position: Defender

Team information
- Current team: Kispest Honvéd
- Number: 52

Youth career
- –2011: LPS Banatul Timișoara
- 2011–2015: Roma
- 2014–2015: → Pescara (loan)

Senior career*
Years	Team	Apps	(Gls)
2014–2015	Roma	0	(0)
2014–2015	→ Pescara (loan)	1	(0)
2015–2016	Virtus Lanciano	5	(0)
2016–2018	Bologna	0	(0)
2016–2017	→ Hellas Verona (loan)	9	(1)
2017	→ Montreal Impact (loan)	5	(0)
2018	→ Hellas Verona (loan)	1	(0)
2018–2020	Hellas Verona	0	(0)
2018–2019	→ Foggia (loan)	6	(0)
2019–2020	→ Partizani (loan)	22	(0)
2020–2021	Potenza	13	(0)
2021–2022	Argeș Pitești	25	(0)
2022–2023	Chindia Târgoviște	25	(1)
2023–2026	Győr	45	(2)
2026–	Kispest Honvéd	7	(0)

International career
2011	Romania U17	3	(0)
2012–2013	Romania U19	5	(1)
2014–2016	Romania U21	14	(1)
- * Club domestic league appearances and goals as of 18 September 2026

Deian Boldor (Serbian Cyrillic: Дејан Болдор, romanized: Dejan Boldor; born 3 February 1995) is a Romanian professional footballer who plays as a defender for Nemzeti Bajnokság I club Kispest Honvéd.

== Club career ==
On 20 July 2017, Boldor was loaned to Montreal Impact of Major League Soccer. He left the Canadian side on 18 January 2018.

=== Hellas Verona ===
In July 2018, Boldor penned a four-year deal with Hellas Verona for a reported transfer fee of €2 million. Just a month later, on 17 August 2018, Boldor was loaned to fellow Serie B side Foggia, until 30 June 2019, in order to get more playing time. On 24 July 2019 he was loaned to Partizani Tirana in Albania.

=== Return to Romania ===
On 28 January 2021 he joined Argeș Pitești.

== Personal life ==
He is of Serb descent.

== Career statistics ==
=== Club ===
As of match played 18 September 2026

Appearances and goals by club, season and competition
Club	Season	League			National cup (Note: Includes Coppa Italia, Albanian Cup, Cupa României, Magyar Kupa)		Europe		Other		Total	
Club	Season	Division	Apps	Goals	Apps	Goals	Apps	Goals	Apps	Goals	Apps	Goals
Pescara (loan)	2014–15	Serie B	1	0	1	0	—		—		2	0
Virtus Lanciano	2015–16	Serie B	5	0	0	0	—		0	0	5	0
Bologna	2016–17	Serie A	0	0	0	0	—		—		0	0
Hellas Verona (loan)	2016–17	Serie B	9	1	1	0	—		—		10	1
Montreal Impact (loan)	2017	Major League Soccer	5	0	—		—		—		5	0
Hellas Verona (loan)	2017–18	Serie A	1	0	—		—		—		1	0
Hellas Verona	2018–19	Serie A	—		0	0	—		—		0	0
Foggia (loan)	2018–19	Serie B	6	0	—		—		—		6	0
Partizani (loan)	2019–20	Kategoria Superiore	22	0	2	0	1 (Note: Appearances in UEFA Europa League)	0	1 (Note: Appearance in Albanian Supercup)	0	26	0
Potenza	2020–21	Serie C	13	0	0	0	—		—		13	0
Argeș Pitești	2020–21	Liga I	9	0	—		—		—		9	0
Argeș Pitești	2021–22	Liga I	16	0	4	0	—		—		20	0
Argeș Pitești	Total		25	0	4	0	—		—		29	0
Chindia Târgoviște	2022–23	Liga I	25	1	3	0	—		—		28	1
Győr	2023–24	Nemzeti Bajnokság II	22	0	2	1	—		—		24	1
Győr	2024–25	Nemzeti Bajnokság I	11	1	2	0	—		—		13	1
Győr	2025–26	Nemzeti Bajnokság I	12	1	4	1	3 (Note: Appearances in UEFA Conference League)	0	—		19	2
Győr	Total		45	2	8	2	3	0	—		56	4
Kispest Honvéd	2026–27	Nemzeti Bajnokság I	7	0	0	0	—		—		7	0
Career total			164	4	19	2	4	0	1	0	188	6

== Honours ==
Partizani

- Albanian Supercup: 2019

Győr

- Nemzeti Bajnokság I: 2025–26
