= Rron Broja =

Kosovan footballer

Personal information
- Full name: Rron Broja
- Date of birth: 9 April 1996 (age 30)
- Place of birth: Mitrovica, FR Yugoslavia
- Height: 1.86 m (6 ft 1 in)
- Position: Defensive midfielder

Team information
- Current team: Drita
- Number: 4

Youth career
- –2015: Trepça '89
- 2015–2016: Gent

Senior career*
Years	Team	Apps	(Gls)
2015–2016	Gent	0	(0)
2015–2016	→ Deinze (loan)	0	(0)
2016–2018	Trepça '89	31	(4)
2018–2019	Shkupi	47	(1)
2019–2021	Partizani Tirana	62	(2)
2021–	Drita	127	(6)

International career^{‡}
2015–2016	Albania U21	5	(0)
2017–2018	Kosovo U21	8	(0)
2020–	Kosovo	3	(0)
- * Club domestic league appearances and goals as of 19 February 2026 ‡ National team caps and goals as of 11 June 2021

Rron Broja (born 9 April 1996) is a Kosovan professional footballer who plays as a defensive midfielder for Kosovan club Drita and the Kosovo national team.

== Club career ==
=== Early career and return to Trepça '89 ===
Broja was part of the youth team of Trepça '89 until January 2015, where he was transferred to the youth team of the Belgian team Gent, where then in July of the same year he was loaned to Belgian First Division B club Deinze, but failed to make a debut. At the beginning of the 2016–17 season, he returns to Trepça '89 but as a senior team player and helped the team to be declared champion in the same season.

=== Shkupi ===
On 11 January 2018, Broja joined Macedonian First Football League side Shkupi. One month later, he made his debut in a 0–3 home defeat against Shkëndija after being named in the starting line-up.

=== Partizani Tirana ===
On 29 June 2019, Broja signed a two-year contract with Kategoria Superiore club Partizani Tirana. Eleven days later, he made his debut with Partizani Tirana in the 2019–20 UEFA Champions League first qualifying round against the Azerbaijani side Qarabağ after coming on as a substitute at 68th minute in place of William Cordeiro Melo.

=== Drita ===
On 3 August 2021, Broja signed a two-year contract with Football Superleague of Kosovo club Drita and received squad number 4.

== International career ==
=== Under-21 ===
==== Albania ====
On 8 June 2015, Broja received a call-up from Albania U21 for the friendly matches against Kazakhstan U21 and Sweden U21. Eight days later, he made his debut with Albania U21 in friendly match against Sweden U21 after being named in the starting line-up.

==== Kosovo ====
On 13 March 2017, Broja through an interview confirmed that he switched his allegiance to Kosovo U21. Eight days later, he received a call-up from Kosovo U21 for a 2019 UEFA European Under-21 Championship qualification match against Republic of Ireland U21, and made his debut after being named in the starting line-up.

=== Senior ===
On 22 January 2018, Broja received his first call-up from national senior team in a friendly match against Azerbaijan. The match however was cancelled two days later, which prolonged his debut. His debut with Kosovo came on 12 January 2020 in a friendly match against Sweden after coming on as a substitute at 64th minute in place of Ismet Lushaku.

== Honours ==
Trepça '89

- Kosovo Superleague: 2016–17
- Kosovar Supercup: 2017

Partizani Tirana

- Albanian Supercup: 2019

Drita

- Kosovo Superleague: 2024–25
