= Aurel Demo =

Albanian footballer

Personal information
- Full name: Aurel Leli Demo
- Date of birth: 20 October 1996 (age 30)
- Place of birth: Kuçovë, Albania
- Height: 1.82 m (6 ft 0 in)
- Position: Defender

Youth career
- –2016: Panegialios

Senior career*
Years	Team	Apps	(Gls)
2016–2018	Panegialios	32	(0)
2018–2020	Luftëtari	55	(1)
- * Club domestic league appearances and goals

Aurel Leli Demo (born 20 October 1996) is an Albanian former footballer who played as a defender.

== Career ==
=== Panegialios F.C. ===
Demo came up through the youth system at Panegialios, and he made his senior league debut for the club on 30 October 2016 in a 0–0 home draw with AO Chania F.C.

=== Luftëtari Gjirokastër ===
In January 2018, Demo was sold to Luftëtari Gjirokastër for an undisclosed transfer fee. He made his league debut for the club on 18 February 2018 in a 2–2 away draw with KF Laçi. He was subbed on in the 70th minute for Bruno Nicolás Toledo Dante. He scored his first competitive goal for the club on 16 December 2018 in a 3–2 away victory in the league over Skënderbeu Korçë. His goal, scored in the 11th minute, leveled the scores at a goal each.
