= Klejdi Dibra =

Albanian footballer (born 1992)

Personal information
- Full name: Klejdi Bardhyl Dibra
- Date of birth: 16 July 1992 (age 34)
- Place of birth: Shkodër, Albania
- Height: 1.82 m (6 ft 0 in)
- Position: Defender

Team information
- Current team: Besëlidhja
- Number: 30

Youth career
- Shkodra
- Vllaznia Shkodër

Senior career*
Years	Team	Apps	(Gls)
2010–2011	Vllaznia	0	(0)
2010–2011	→ Tërbuni (loan)	1	(0)
2011–2021	Besëlidhja	185	(9)
2021–2022	Burreli	27	(3)
2022–	Besëlidhja	22	(0)
- * Club domestic league appearances and goals as of 19 May 2023

Klejdi Bardhyl Dibra (born 16 July 1992) is an Albanian footballer who plays as a defender for Besëlidhja in Kategoria e Dytë.

He hails from Shkodër.

He spent most of his career with Besëlidhja, where he served as team captain.
