= Redon Dragoshi =

Albanian footballer

Personal information
- Date of birth: 18 March 2000 (age 26)
- Place of birth: Tirana, Albania
- Height: 1.87 m (6 ft 2 in)
- Position: Defender

Team information
- Current team: Pogradeci
- Number: 17

Youth career
- 2008–2018: Tirana

Senior career*
Years	Team	Apps	(Gls)
2018–2019	Erzeni Shijak	22	(2)
2019–2020	Luftëtari Gjirokastër	23	(0)
2020–2023	Kukësi	64	(1)
2023–2024	Vllaznia Shkodër	5	(0)
2024–2025	Kukësi	6	(1)
2025–	Pogradeci	5	(0)

International career^{‡}
2016	Albania U17	1	(0)
2018	Albania U19	5	(0)
2021	Albania U21	1	(0)
- * Club domestic league appearances and goals as of 28 April 2024 ‡ National team caps and goals as of 8 June 2021

Redon Dragoshi (born 18 March 2000) is an Albanian footballer who plays as a defender for Kukësi in the Kategoria Superiore.

== Career ==
=== Kukësi ===
In August 2020, Dragoshi signed a two-year deal with Kukësi, making him at the time the youngest player in the squad's first team.
