= KF Skënderbeu B =

Albanian football club

Skënderbeu B
- Full name: Klubi i Futbollit Skënderbeu Korçë B
- Nicknames: Ujqërit e Dëborës; Bardhekuqtë; Juglindorët
- Founded: 31 August 2015; 10 years ago
- Ground: Skënderbeu Stadium
- Capacity: 5,724
- Owner: Municipality of Korçë
- President: Ardian Takaj
- Manager: Vasjan Ballço
- Website: http://www.kfskenderbeu.al
Home colours	Away colours	Third colours

Klubi Futbollistik Skënderbeu B (Albanian pronunciation: [skəndɛɾbɛu kɔɾtʃə]) is the reserve team of KF Skënderbeu Korçë. The team is currently not competing in the any football league.
