= IDS Tirana =

Albanian football club

- Full name: IDS Tirana
- Founded: 2012
- Ground: Kamza Sports Complex
- Capacity: 1,500

IDS Tirana is a football club based in Tirana, Albania. They recently competed in the Albanian Third Division. Their home ground is the Kamza Sports Complex.
