= Jurgen Dushkaj =

Albanian footballer

Personal information
- Date of birth: 9 June 1995 (age 31)
- Place of birth: Lezhë, Albania
- Height: 1.83 m (6 ft 0 in)
- Position: Midfielder

Team information
- Current team: Burreli
- Number: 9

Senior career*
Years	Team	Apps	(Gls)
2014–2015	Ada	7	(1)
2015–2016	Sporting Liești		
2016	Sepsi OSK		
2016–2017	Sporting Liești		
2018	Dacia Unirea Brăila	7	(0)
2018–2019	KSE		
2019–2020	Luftëtari	28	(0)
2020–2021	Bylis	5	(0)
2021	Kukësi	0	(0)
2022	Phoenix Banjë	0	(0)
2022	Llapi	2	(0)
2022–2023	Tomori Berat	22	(1)
2023–2024	Vushtrria		
2024–	Burreli	27	(0)
- * Club domestic league appearances and goals as of 20 May 2023

Jurgen Dushkaj (born 9 June 1995) is an Albanian footballer free agent who most recently played as a midfielder for Burreli.

== Career ==
=== Luftëtari ===
In August 2019, Dushkaj returned to his native Albania, signing with Luftëtari in the Albanian Superliga. He made his league debut for the club on 24 August 2019, playing the entirety of a 3–0 away defeat to KF Tirana.

=== Burreli ===
On 17 July 2024, he signed for Burreli of the Kategoria e Parë.
