= Donald Mëllugja =

Albanian footballer

Personal information
- Date of birth: 31 May 1995 (age 31)
- Place of birth: Burrel, Albania
- Height: 1.75 m (5 ft 9 in)
- Position: Midfielder

Team information
- Current team: Besa Kavajë
- Number: 18

Senior career*
Years	Team	Apps	(Gls)
2013–2018	Burreli	110	(8)
2017	→ Iliria (loan)	12	(2)
2018–2019	Besa Kavajë	19	(1)
2019–2021	Bylis	44	(1)
2021	Partizani	2	(0)
2021	→ Partizani II	2	(0)
2021–2022	Kastrioti	10	(0)
2022	Burreli	5	(0)
2022–2024	Egnatia	46	(1)
2024	Erzeni	11	(0)
2024–	KF Besa Kavajë	10	(0)
- * Club domestic league appearances and goals as of 21 March 2024

Donald Mëllugja (born 31 May 1995) is an Albanian professional footballer who plays as a midfielder for Besa Kavajë in the Kategoria e Parë.
