= Odirah Ntephe =

Nigerian footballer

Personal information
- Full name: Odirah Franklin Ntephe
- Date of birth: 26 September 1993 (age 33)
- Place of birth: Onitsha, Nigeria
- Position: Right midfielder

Team information
- Current team: Vora
- Number: 21

Senior career*
Years	Team	Apps	(Gls)
2016–2022	Bylis	133	(13)
2022	Burreli	4	(0)
2022–2023	Besa Kavajë	22	(2)
2023–	Vora	22	(1)
- * Club domestic league appearances and goals as of 4 May 2024

Odirah Franklin Ntephe (born 26 September 1993) is a Nigerian footballer who plays as a right midfielder for Vora in Kategoria e Parë.
