= Bruno Telushi =

Albanian footballer

Personal information
- Date of birth: 14 November 1990 (age 35)
- Place of birth: Vlorë, Albania
- Height: 1.81 m (5 ft 11 in)
- Position: Defensive midfielder

Team information
- Current team: Elbasani
- Number: 17

Youth career
- 2000–2007: Flamurtari

Senior career*
Years	Team	Apps	(Gls)
2007–2011	Virtus Entella	20	(0)
2011–2017	Flamurtari	154	(18)
2017	Slaven Belupo	8	(0)
2018–2020	Partizani	69	(12)
2020	Kukësi	0	(0)
2020–2021	Neftçi	9	(0)
2021–2022	Egnatia	11	(2)
2022–2023	Partizani	26	(0)
2023–	Elbasani	24	(2)

International career
2006–2007	Albania U17	2	(0)
2011–2012	Albania U21	4	(1)
- * Club domestic league appearances and goals as of 1 June 2024

Bruno Telushi (born 14 November 1990) is an Albanian professional footballer who plays as a defensive midfielder for AF Elbasani.

Telushi began his career with his local club Flamurtari, making his debut in 2011 after spending four years in Italy at Virtus Entella. From 2014 to 2017 he served as the captain of Flamurtari, replacing Franc Veliu. In 2017, he moved aboard for the first time, joining Croatia's Slaven Belupo. After a short spell, he returned in Albanian by joining Partizani Tirana, whom he won the Albanian Superliga title in the 2018–19 season. In August 2020, he joined Kukësi as a free agent.

A former youth international, Telushi first represented the under-17 squad and then the under-21, and is yet to make his senior debut, despite receiving a call-up in November 2012.

== Club career ==
=== Flamurtari ===
Telushi was born in Vlorë. He returned to his hometown club Flamurtari in 2011 and was immediately introduced into the first team, although he was an unused substitute in three of the club's Europa League games at the start of the season. He made his Flamurtari and Albanian Superliga debut on 11 September 2011 against newly promoted side Kamza in a 2–1 win, with Telushi playing the full 90 minutes of the game. Flamurtari finished the season in the fourth place, and since Tirana was the Albanian Cup winner, Flamurtari gained the right to qualify in the Europa League for the next season.

Telushi made his European debut on 5 July 2012 in the first leg of 2012–13 UEFA Europa League's first qualifying round against the Hungarian side Honvéd at home, playing full-90 minutes in a losing effort. He ended his European campaign by playing 73 minutes in the returning leg at Bozsik Stadion, as Flamurtari was eliminated with the aggregate 3–0.

On 10 November 2013, Telushi scored his first career brace in the 11th matchday of Albanian Superliga against Lushnja; he scored the first two goals of his team before being replaced by Orjand Beqiri in the 83rd minute, as Flamurtari won 4–3 thanks to a Lorenc Shehaj strike in the very last seconds of the match. On 11 November 2014, Telushi was named the new captain of Flamurtari thanks to his solid performances, taking the duty over Franc Veliu.

On 17 October 2015, Telushi played his 100th league match during the 1–1 away draw against Tirana, playing full-90 minutes at Qemal Stafa Stadium. On 7 November 2015, during the league match against Teuta at Niko Dovana Stadium, Telushi was red-carded in 81st minute after punching Teuta's defender Silvester Shkalla. Flamurtari lost the match 3–1. Four days later, he was later suspended for 5 matches for his behaviour by the Disciplinary Committee of AFA.

On 17 February of the following year, in the match valid for the returning leg of 2015–16 Albanian Cup quarter-final, Telushi scored the opener against Tirana in the 16th minute in an eventual 2–1 away win. Flamurtari, despite losing 1–0 in the first leg at home, progressed to the semi-final thanks to away goal rule.

During the 2016–17 season, Telushi played 32 league matches, scoring four times in the process, as the team avoided relegation by just one point. He also contributed with 5 matches in Albanian Cup, scoring three times, including a brace in the first round against Iliria, as Flamurtari was eliminated in the quarter-finals.

=== Slaven Belupo ===
On 10 June 2017, it was reported that Telushi left Flamurtari to pursue a career outside of Albania, asking the club to be released, which was granted. On 13 June 2017, Telushi joined Slaven Belupo of Prva HNL as a free transfer. He was presented the same day where he penned a two-year contract with an option of a further one. After his three first appearances with the club he was selected as the player of the week of Prva HNL. After an initial good start, Telushi lost his place in the starting lineup before leaving the club in December 2017. He made 9 appearances, including 8 in league, as the last match he played was on 16 September.

=== Partizani ===
On 12 December 2017, Telushi begun training with Partizani. Three days later, he completed a transfer with the capital club by signing a two-and-a-half contract, receiving his favourite squad number 17 in the process. He made his first Partizani appearance on 26 January by playing the entirely of the match against his former side Flamurtari, as Partizani was defeated in the very last seconds.

Telushi begun the new domestic season on 17 August by playing full-90 minutes in the opening league match of season, a 1–0 loss to Skënderbeu. In the second week eight days later, he scored in the match against Kamza, firing a direct free-kick which gave the team the first win of the season. In the 2018–19 Albanian Superliga season, Telushi was one of the main protagonists in Skënder Gega, which won the championship for Partizani for the first time in 26 years; he scored 7 goals, setting a new personal best. During that season, he also earned the nickname "Ushtar Telushi" ("Soldier Telushi" in English) for his work-rate.

On 12 February 2020, Telushi scored his first career hat-trick in a 3–1 win over Besëlidhja Lezhë in the Albanian Cup.

On 10 August 2020, Partizani announced to have parted ways with Telushi, thus ending the player's two-and-a-half tenure at the club. According to the media, Partizani offered him the renewal but with a significant wage decrease, which Telushi refused.

=== Kukësi ===
On 12 August 2020, Kukësi announced they had signed Telushi on a dead run until 2022. It was reported that he will earn €6,000 per month.

=== Neftçi ===
On 15 October 2020, Telushi signed a contract with Azerbaijan Premier League side Neftçi PFK until the end of the 2020–21 season. Telushi left Neftçi in June 2021.

== International career ==
=== Youth ===
In October 2006, Telushi was called to play for the Albania U17 side in the qualifying round of UEFA European Under-17 Championship. He made his competitive debut with the team on 15 October in a 4–1 away loss to Finland.

Telushi made his debut with Albania U21 side on 6 September 2011 during match against Moldova for the qualifiers of the 2013 UEFA European Under-21 Championship. He appeared as a 33rd-minute substitute for the injured striker Armando Pasha and later scored the fourth goal of the match on the 79th minute in an eventual 4–3 home win. Telushi made his first start in his fourth appearance later on 14 November 2011 in a 2–2 home draw against Portugal, playing for 80 minutes before being replaced by Vasil Shkurtaj. Albania finished the qualifiers in the last position in Group 6 with one win, two draws and five defeats, collecting only five points.

=== Senior ===
On 11 November 2012, Telushi was called up to the Albania national football team for the first time by the coach Gianni De Biasi ahead of a friendly against the Cameroon. He was an unused substitute in the match which finished in a goalless draw at Stade de Genève.

== Style of play ==
Telushi mainly operates as a central midfielder, but he can play in different positions in midfield. He is a very energetic player who also possesses an eye for goal due to his accurate striking ability from distance. He is also known for scoring from free kicks and penalties. Telushi has cited his role model the former English midfielder Steven Gerrard.

== Career statistics ==
=== Club ===
As of 29 July 2020

Appearances and goals by club, season and competition
Club	Season	League			Cup		Europe		Other		Total	
Club	Season	Division	Apps	Goals	Apps	Goals	Apps	Goals	Apps	Goals	Apps	Goals
Flamurtari	2011–12	Albanian Superliga	19	1	12	0	0	0	—		31	1
Flamurtari	2012–13	Albanian Superliga	23	0	8	0	2 (Note: All appearance(s) in UEFA Europa League)	0	—		33	0
Flamurtari	2013–14	Albanian Superliga	21	3	4	1	—		—		25	4
Flamurtari	2014–15	Albanian Superliga	31	4	2	0	4	0	1 (Note: Appearance in Albanian Supercup)	0	38	4
Flamurtari	2015–16	Albanian Superliga	28	6	6	1	—		—		34	7
Flamurtari	2016–17	Albanian Superliga	32	4	5	3	—		—		37	7
Flamurtari	Total		154	18	37	5	6	0	1	0	198	23
Slaven Belupo	2017–18	Prva HNL	8	0	1	0	—		—		9	0
Partizani	2017–18	Albanian Superliga	10	0	1	0	—		—		11	0
Partizani	2018–19	Albanian Superliga	26	7	1	1	2	0	—		29	8
Partizani	2019–20	Albanian Superliga	33	5	3	4	4 (Note: Two appearances in UEFA Champions League, two appearances in UEFA Europa League)	0	1	0	41	9
Partizani	Total		69	12	5	5	6	0	1	0	81	17
Kukësi	2020–21	Albanian Superliga	0	0	0	0	0	0	—		0	0
Career total			231	30	43	10	12	0	2	0	288	40

== Honours ==
Virtus Entella

- Eccellenza: 2007–08

Flamurtari

- Albanian Cup: 2013–14

Partizani

- Albanian Superliga: 2018–19
- Albanian Supercup: 2019

Sporting positions
Preceded by Franc Veliu	Flamurtari Vlorë captain 2014–2017	Succeeded by Franc Veliu
