= Joseph Ekuban =

Ghanaian footballer

Personal information
- Full name: Joseph Ansah Ekuban
- Date of birth: 2 January 2000 (age 26)
- Place of birth: Villafranca di Verona, Italy
- Height: 1.94 m (6 ft 4 in)
- Position: Forward

Team information
- Current team: Guidonia

Youth career
- –2018: Verona

Senior career*
Years	Team	Apps	(Gls)
2018–2020	Verona	0	(0)
2018–2019	→ Mantova (loan)	4	(1)
2019–2020	→ Partizani Tirana (loan)	1	(0)
2020	→ Virtus Francavilla (loan)	3	(0)
2020–2023	Virtus Francavilla	36	(3)
2022	→ Monterosi (loan)	17	(3)
2023	→ Fidelis Andria (loan)	17	(0)
2023–2024	Monterosi	17	(0)
2024	Arezzo	8	(0)
2024–2025	Turris	13	(1)
2025–2026	Latina	34	(2)
2026	Renate	14	(4)
2026–	Cittadella	1	(1)
- * Club domestic league appearances and goals as of 29 April 2026

Joseph Ansah Ekuban (born 2 January 2000) is a Ghanaian professional footballer who plays as a forward for Italian Serie C Group A club Cittadella.

== Career ==
=== Verona ===
Ekuban was raised in the youth teams of Verona. He never was called up to the senior squad. He spent 2018–19 season in Serie D with Mantova.

==== Loan to Partizani ====
On 12 July 2019, he joined Albanian Superliga club Partizani Tirana on loan with an option to buy.

He made his first appearances for Partizani in July in their European (UEFA Champions League and UEFA Europa League) qualifying matches against Qarabağ and Sheriff Tiraspol.

He made his professional Albanian Superliga debut for Partizani on 15 September 2019, in a game against Laçi, coming on as a substitute for Jasir Asani in the 57th minute. On 20 January 2020, Partizani announced that they are terminating the loan early. He made just one appearance in the Albanian Superliga, two in Albanian Cup and two in UEFA qualifiers.

=== Virtus Francavilla ===
On 21 January 2020, he signed a two-and-a-half-year contract with Serie C club Virtus Francavilla.

==== Loan to Monterosi ====
On 20 January 2022, he was loaned to Monterosi.

==== Loan to Fidelis Andria ====
On 6 January 2023, Ekuban moved on loan to Fidelis Andria.

=== Arezzo ===
On 1 February 2024, Ekuban signed with Arezzo.

== Personal life ==
His older brother Caleb Ekuban is also a footballer. He scored 17 goals for Partizani in the 2016–17 season, two years prior to Joseph joining the club.
