= Aristóteles Romero =

Venezuelan footballer (born 1995)

Personal information
- Full name: Hermes Aristóteles Romero Espinoza
- Date of birth: 18 October 1995 (age 31)
- Place of birth: Calabozo, Guárico, Venezuela
- Height: 1.84 m (6 ft 0 in)
- Position: Midfielder

Senior career*
| Years | Team | Apps | (Gls) |
| 2013–2015 | Carabobo | 10 | (1) |
| 2014–2015 | → Monagas (loan) | | |
| 2015 | Deportivo Lara | 16 | (0) |
| 2016 | Carabobo | 10 | (0) |
| 2016–2017 | Mineros | 34 | (3) |
| 2017–2021 | Crotone | 8 | (0) |
| 2018 | → Ankaran Hrvatini (loan) | 10 | (1) |
| 2019 | → Rayo Majadahonda (loan) | 5 | (0) |
| 2019–2020 | → Partizani Tirana (loan) | 14 | (0) |
| 2022 | Deportivo Lara | 2 | (0) |
| 2022 | Partizani Tirana | 2 | (0) |

International career^{‡}
| 2017– | Venezuela | 4 | (0) |
- * Club domestic league appearances and goals as of 21 May 2021 ‡ National team caps and goals as of 19 November 2018

Hermes Aristóteles Romero Espinoza (born 18 October 1995) is a Venezuelan footballer who plays as a midfielder.

== Club career ==
Aristotle began his career at Carabobo FC. He had a loan stint with Monagas Sport Club, before returning to Carabobo. He then moved to Cabudaren club ACD Lara. In June 2016 he signed on with Mineros de Guayana, becoming a regular in the team from Puerto Ordaz.

On 31 January 2019, he joined Spanish club Rayo Majadahonda on loan until the end of the 2018–19 season.

== International career ==
He was called up to the Venezuela national football team in September 2016. He, however, did not break into the first team for the 2018 FIFA World Cup qualification (CONMEBOL) matches against Brazil and Uruguay.
