= Franci Lala =

Albanian footballer

Personal information
- Date of birth: 11 July 1999 (age 27)
- Place of birth: Tirana, Albania
- Height: 1.88 m (6 ft 2 in)
- Position: Defender

Team information
- Current team: Iliria Fushë-Krujë
- Number: 46

Youth career
- 2012–2019: Partizani Tirana

Senior career*
Years	Team	Apps	(Gls)
2019	Korabi Peshkopi	2	(0)
2019–2020	Luftëtari	26	(0)
2020–2021	Korabi Peshkopi	8	(3)
2021	Partizani	10	(0)
2021–2022	Tomori	25	(0)
2022–2023	Korabi Peshkopi	26	(2)
2023–2025	Kukësi	32	(0)
2025	Vëllaznimi		
2025–	Iliria Fushë-Krujë	0	(0)
- * Club domestic league appearances and goals

Franci Lala (born 11 July 1999) is an Albanian footballer who plays as a defender for Iliria Fushë-Krujë.

== Career ==
=== Luftëtari ===
In August 2019, Lala moved to Albanian Superliga club Luftëtari on a free transfer. He made his debut for the club in official competition on 24 August 2019, coming on as a 49th-minute substitute for Armenis Kukaj in a 3–0 away defeat to KF Tirana.

=== Iliria Fushë-Krujë ===
On 29 June 2025, he signed for Iliria Fushë-Krujë of the Kategoria e Parë.
