= Besnik Ferati =

Macedonian footballer

Personal information
- Date of birth: 19 April 2000 (age 26)
- Place of birth: Skopje, Macedonia
- Height: 1.86 m (6 ft 1 in)
- Position: Midfielder

Team information
- Current team: Malisheva
- Number: 6

Youth career
- 2016–2018: Shkupi

Senior career*
| Years | Team | Apps | (Gls) |
| 2018–2020 | Partizani Tirana | 22 | (1) |
| 2021–2022 | Akademija Pandev | 22 | (0) |
| 2022–2023 | Shkupi | 1 | (0) |
| 2023 | → Pobeda (loan) | 10 | (1) |
| 2023– | Malisheva | 89 | (4) |

International career^{‡}
| 2016 | North Macedonia U17 | 3 | (0) |
| 2018 | North Macedonia U18 | 4 | (0) |
| 2018 | North Macedonia U19 | 5 | (0) |
| 2021 | North Macedonia U21 | 7 | (0) |
- * Club domestic league appearances and goals as of 22 June 2026 ‡ National team caps and goals as of 13 October 2021

Besnik Ferati (Macedonian: Бесник Ферати; born 19 April 2000) is a Macedonian footballer who plays as a midfielder for Kosovan club Malisheva.

== Career ==
=== Partizani Tirana ===
In August 2018, Ferati joined the club on a free transfer. He made his Albanian Superliga debut on 18 May 2019, playing the entirety of a 2–0 away defeat to Teuta Durrës.
