= Hektor Idrizaj =

Albanian footballer

Personal information
- Date of birth: 15 April 1989 (age 37)
- Place of birth: Vlorë, PSR Albania
- Height: 1.74 m (5 ft 9 in)
- Positions: Right back; left back

Youth career
- 2000–2008: Flamurtari Vlorë

Senior career*
Years	Team	Apps	(Gls)
2008–2013	Bylis Ballsh	80	(1)
2013–2014	Teuta Durrës	30	(1)
2014–2016	Flamurtari Vlorë	51	(0)
2016–2017	Skënderbeu Korçë	6	(0)
2017–2019	Kamza	44	(0)
2019–2021	Partizani Tiranë	58	(1)
2021–2023	Teuta Durrës	37	(0)
2023–2024	Skënderbeu	11	(0)
- * Club domestic league appearances and goals

Hektor Idrizaj (born 15 April 1989) is an Albanian former professional footballer who played as a defender. Now he works as assistant coach at the Albanian team AF Elbasani.

== Club career ==
=== Early career ===
Idrizaj joined the youth setup of local side Flamurtari Vlorë as an 11 year old in 2000, and he progressed through the ranks at the club and played at under-17 and under-19 level, before leaving in 2008 to sign his first professional contract with Bylis Ballsh. He made his professional debut on 14 September 2008 in a league game against Elbasani, where he came on as a 20th-minute substitute for injured Roland Nenaj in what would be his only appearance in a season that saw Bylis Ballsh get relegated from the Albanian Superliga.

=== Skënderbeu Korçë ===
On 24 June 2016, Idrizaj was presented as the new player of Skënderbeu Korçë; he joined on a three-year contract, taking squad number 28. His competitive debut began on 1 October in the championship matchday 5 in Skënderbeu's 3–0 rout of Vllaznia Shkodër. He opened his scoring account four days later in the returning leg of 2016–17 Albanian Cup first round against Butrinti Sarandë which was won a record 8–0. He spent the majority of his spell on bench, making only 11 appearances between league and cup, collecting 711 minutes in total as Skënderbeu finished runner-up in cup and failed to win the championship for the first time in six years. In June 2017, he terminated the contract with the club by mutual consent and become a free agent.

=== Kamza ===
On 30 July 2017, Idrizaj completed a transfer to newly promoted top flight side Kamza by penning a contract for the 2017–18 season. He made his competitive debut in the opening week of championship on 9 September versus Kukësi, and became a regular starter afterwards.

== Career statistics ==
As of 8 August 2021

Club statistics
Club	Season	League			Cup		Continental		Other		Total	
Club	Season	Division	Apps	Goals	Apps	Goals	Apps	Goals	Apps	Goals	Apps	Goals
Bylis Ballsh	2008–09	Albanian Superliga	1	0	0	0	—		—		1	0
Bylis Ballsh	2009–10	Albanian First Division	10	0	1	0	—		—		11	0
Bylis Ballsh	2010–11	Albanian Superliga	19	0	2	0	—		—		21	0
Bylis Ballsh	2011–12	Albanian Superliga	17	0	11	0	—		—		28	0
Bylis Ballsh	2012–13	Albanian Superliga	25	1	12	0	—		—		37	1
Bylis Ballsh	Total		72	1	26	0	—		—		98	1
Teuta Durrës	2013–14	Albanian Superliga	30	1	5	0	2 (Note: All appearance(s) in UEFA Europa League)	0	—		37	1
Flamurtari Vlorë	2014–15	Albanian Superliga	24	0	1	0	1	0	0	0	26	0
Flamurtari Vlorë	2015–16	Albanian Superliga	29	0	6	0	—		—		35	0
Flamurtari Vlorë	Total		53	0	7	0	1	0	0	0	61	0
Skënderbeu Korçë	2016–17	Albanian Superliga	6	0	5	1	—		0	0	11	1
Kamza	2017–18	Albanian Superliga	26	0	2	0	—		—		28	0
Kamza	2018–19	Albanian Superliga	18	0	2	0	—		—		20	0
Kamza	Total		44	0	4	0	—		—		48	0
Partizani Tiranë	2018–19	Albanian Superliga	3	0	1	0	—		—		4	0
Partizani Tiranë	2019–20	Albanian Superliga	27	0	2	0	0	0	—		29	0
Partizani Tiranë	2020–21	Albanian Superliga	28	1	2	0	0	0	—		30	1
Partizani Tiranë	Total		58	1	5	0	0	0	—		63	1
Teuta Durrës	2021–22	Albanian Superliga	28	0	5	0	0	0	1	0	34	0
Career total			291	3	57	1	3	0	1	0	352	4
