= Lorenc Trashi =

Albanian footballer

Personal information
- Date of birth: 19 May 1992 (age 34)
- Place of birth: Gramsh, Albania
- Height: 1.77 m (5 ft 10 in)
- Position: Midfielder

Team information
- Current team: Besëlidhja
- Number: 19

Youth career
- 2002–2008: Gramshi

Senior career*
Years	Team	Apps	(Gls)
2008–2013	Gramshi	90	(8)
2013–2014	Lushnja	27	(6)
2014–2020	Partizani Tirana	192	(12)
2020–2023	Qadsia	104	(12)
2023–2024	Ballkani	42	(0)
2024–2026	Flamurtari	61	(1)
2026–	Besëlidhja	0	(0)

International career^{‡}
2014–2015	Albania U21	1	(0)
2019–	Albania	15	(1)
- * Club domestic league appearances and goals as of 13 May 2026 ‡ National team caps and goals as of 14 October 2019

Lorenc Trashi (born 19 May 1992) is an Albanian professional footballer who plays as a midfielder for Besëlidhja and the Albania national team.

== Club career ==
=== Gramshi ===
Trashi began his career with his local team KF Gramshi, where he was promoted to the senior side in 2008 while the club was in the Albanian Second Division. During the season Gramshi won the northern division and reached the championship final, which they lost to KF Memaliaj The following season his side were promoted and he played in the Albanian First Division, where he featured in 19 league games and scored his first senior goal, helping his side avoid relegation and finish comfortably in 10th place. In his second season in the First Division he again helped his side avoid relegation, this time narrowly on goal difference, and he featured in 20 league games without scoring a goal. During the 2011–12 season he played 25 league games and scored 2 goals, which helped his side finish in a respectable 8th place out of 16 teams. The following season, however, Gramshi struggled despite Trashi's good individual performances throughout the campaign. In February 2013 he was awarded with the 'Pride of the City' title by the Gramsh municipality on their 53rd anniversary for his contribution to the city's football team. He was hit by controversy in April 2013 when he fell out with his head coach Edmond Hida and was expelled from the squad due to what he described as Trashi's unsporting behaviour. However, he was eventually invited back into the squad in order to help them in their relegation struggle. He ended the 2012–13 campaign with 5 goals in 25 league games, but his side were eventually relegated after finishing in penultimate place.

=== KF Lushnja ===
Following Gramshi's relegation from the Albanian First Division, Trashi was allowed to leave the club and sign for another team, and he eventually signed for newly promoted Albanian Superliga side KS Lushnja prior to the 2013–14 campaign. He scored the only goal on his Albanian Superliga debut against FK Kukësi and was named the man of the match. His goal came in the 54th minute from an assist by Gentian Çela, which Trashi converted into the net with a volley on his left foot. He quickly established himself as a first team regular, playing on both sides of the midfield and developing an effective relationship with Erlind Koreshi on the opposite flank and with the striker Mikel Canka. His next goal came in a memorable 2–0 win over Partizani Tirana, where he opened the scoring with an individual effort after picking up the ball from the centre circle and beating Partizani's defenders to then beat the keeper with a powerful left footed strike into the top left corner.

Lushnja continued to struggle in the league despite Trashi's and Canka's impressive performances, both of whom linked up well to create the opening goal in an away game against Flamurtari Vlorë on 10 November, where Trashi again took the lead in the 51st minute but his side still fell to a 4–3 defeat. By the January transfer window he was considered the discovery of the season in Albanian football, and had attracted attention from bigger clubs due to his good form and 4 league goals in the first half of the season. He was offered a move to FK Kukësi, which he subsequently turned down in favour of remaining with Lushnja, a decision not shared by his midfield partner Erlind Koreshi, who opted for a mid season move to KF Tirana. In a crucial relegation battle scrap against Bylis Ballsh on 22 February, Trashi scored his 5th league goal of the season from a free kick to open the scoring after 13 minutes in the 2–0 win.

He scored once again in the next league game against Besa Kavajë in the 83rd minute to equalise, beating the keeper from a powerful free kick again. Lushnja were eventually relegated after finishing second from bottom in the league, losing 11 of their last 12 games and finishing 13 points clear of safety. His individual performances throughout the season were noticed and he was featured in the Albanian Superliga Team of the Year, as well as being nominated for Talent of the Year, an award for the best young players in the Albanian Superliga.

=== Partizani Tirana ===
Following KF Lushnja's relegation from the Albanian Superliga, Trashi signed a three-year contract with Partizani Tirana on 31 May 2014.

On 9 November 2015, he extended his contract for another three seasons, kepping him at the club until 2018.

=== Qadsia ===
On 21 June 2020, Partizani Tirana through a communiqué stated that Trashi from next season would be part of Kuwait Premier League club Qadsia.

== International career ==
Trashi was first involved internationally when he was invited by Albania U21s coach Skënder Gega to a three-day trial in February 2013 while he was playing for KF Gramshi. He came on as a second-half substitute in the unofficial friendly against Kosovo Superleague side KF Drenica at the end of the trial, which Albania U21s lost 2–0.

He was first called up to the Albania national senior team in March 2019 for games against Turkey and Andorra, but remained on the bench. He made his debut on 14 October 2019 in a Euro 2020 qualifier against Moldova. He started the game and scored the third goal in a 4–0 away victory.

== Honours ==
Gramshi

- Albanian Second Division - Runner-up (1): 2008–09

Partizani-champion of Albania

Individual

- Pride of the City of Gramsh
- Albanian Talent of the Year - third place (1): 2013–14
- Albanian Superliga Team of the Year

(1): 2013–14
