= Eneo Bitri =

Albanian footballer (born 1996)

Personal information
- Full name: Eneo Bitri
- Date of birth: 26 August 1996 (age 30)
- Place of birth: Berat, Albania
- Height: 1.92 m (6 ft 4 in)
- Position: Centre-back

Team information
- Current team: Egnatia
- Number: 33

Youth career
- –2013: Tomori Berat

Senior career*
Years	Team	Apps	(Gls)
2013–2018	Tomori Berat	90	(7)
2018–2021	Partizani Tirana	66	(5)
2019	→ Kamza (loan)	4	(0)
2021–2022	Astana	7	(0)
2022–2023	Partizani Tirana	34	(4)
2023	Baník Ostrava	17	(2)
2023–2025	Vålerenga	12	(1)
2024	→ Cracovia (loan)	10	(1)
2024–2025	→ Győr (loan)	22	(5)
2025–2026	Nyíregyháza	8	(0)
2026–	Egnatia	0	(0)

International career^{‡}
2022	Albania	2	(0)
- * Club domestic league appearances and goals as of 19 January 2026 ‡ National team caps and goals as of 22:41, 11 November 2022 (UTC)

Eneo Bitri (born 26 August 1996) is an Albanian professional footballer who plays as a centre-back in Abissnet Superiore club Egnatia.

== Career ==
=== Club ===
On 25 June 2021, FC Astana announced the signing of Bitri. On 2 January 2022, Astana announced that Bitri had left the club by mutual consent.

On 24 August 2023, Bitri signed a two-year contract with Norwegian club Vålerenga Fotball.

On 31 January 2024, following Valerenga's relegation to Norwegian First Division, Bitri joined Polish side Cracovia on a six-month loan with an option to buy.

After leaving Cracovia at the end of the 2023–24 season, Bitri moved to Hungarian club Győr on a one-year loan on 5 July 2024.

On 2 September 2025, Bitri signed with Hungarian club Nyíregyháza Spartacus FC.

== Career statistics ==
=== Club ===
As of match played 19 January 2026

Appearances and goals by club, season and competition
Club	Season	League			National cup		Europe		Other		Total	
Club	Season	Division	Apps	Goals	Apps	Goals	Apps	Goals	Apps	Goals	Apps	Goals
Partizani Tirana	2018–19	Kategoria Superiore	4	0	2	0	0	0	—		6	0
Partizani Tirana	2019–20	Kategoria Superiore	27	3	3	0	4 (Note: Two appearances in UEFA Champions League, two appearances in UEFA Europa League)	0	1 (Note: Appearance in Superkupa e Shqipërisë)	0	35	3
Partizani Tirana	2020–21	Kategoria Superiore	35	2	3	0	—		—		38	2
Partizani Tirana	Total		66	5	8	0	4	0	1	0	79	5
Kamza (loan)	2018–19	Kategoria Superiore	4	0	1	1	—		—		5	1
Astana	2021	Kazakhstan Premier League	7	0	6	0	4 (Note: Appearances in UEFA Europa Conference League)	2	0 (Note: Appearance in Kazakhstan Super Cup)	0	17	2
Partizani Tirana	2021–22	Kategoria Superiore	17	2	4	0	0	0	—		21	2
Partizani Tirana	2022–23	Kategoria Superiore	17	2	2	0	2	0	—		21	2
Partizani Tirana	Total		34	4	6	0	2	0	—		42	4
Baník Ostrava	2022–23	Czech First League	17	2	—		—		—		17	2
Vålerenga	2023	Eliteserien	12	1	1	0	—		—		13	1
Cracovia (loan)	2023–24	Ekstraklasa	10	1	—		—		—		10	1
Győr (loan)	2024–25	Nemzeti Bajnokság I	22	5	0	0	—		—		22	5
Nyíregyháza	2025–26	Nemzeti Bajnokság I	6	0	0	0	—		—		6	0
Egnatia	2026–27	Abissnet Superiore	0	0	0	0	—		—		0	0
Career total			178	18	22	1	10	2	1	0	211	19

== Honours ==
Partizani Tirana

- Kategoria Superiore: 2022–23
- Albanian Supercup: 2019
