= Eneid Kodra =

Albanian footballer

Personal information
- Date of birth: 4 November 1999 (age 27)
- Place of birth: Tirana, Albania
- Height: 1.84 m (6 ft 0 in)
- Position: Midfielder

Team information
- Current team: Drenica
- Number: 22

Youth career
- 2011–2013: Olimpik Tirana
- 2013–2014: FARI FC
- 2014–2015: FC Inter Tirana
- 2015–2018: Partizani Tirana

Senior career*
Years	Team	Apps	(Gls)
2018–2021	Partizani Tirana	10	(0)
2020–2021	Partizani Tirana B	15	(0)
2021–2024	Kastrioti Krujë	85	(1)
2024–2025	Suhareka	32	(4)
2025–	Drenica	29	(1)
- * Club domestic league appearances and goals as of 22 June 2026

Eneid Kodra (born 4 November 1999) is an Albanian footballer who plays as a midfielder for Drenica in Kosovo.

== Career ==
=== Partizani Tirana ===
Kodra made his league debut for the club on 1 September 2018, coming on as a 70th-minute substitute for Jasir Asani in a 1–0 home victory over Kastrioti.

=== Drenica ===
In August, 2025, he joined Drenica of the Football Superleague of Kosovo.
