= Theophilus Solomon =

Nigerian footballer (born 1996)

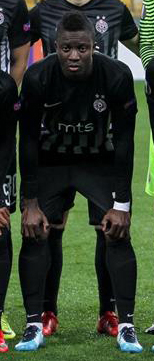
- Solomon with Partizan in December 2017

Personal information
- Full name: Theophilus Solomon
- Date of birth: 18 January 1996 (age 30)
- Place of birth: Kaduna, Nigeria
- Height: 1.83 m (6 ft 0 in)
- Position: Forward

Team information
- Current team: Vushtrria
- Number: 45

Youth career
- Abuja Football College
- –2012: Eco Football Club
- 2012–2014: Rijeka

Senior career*
Years	Team	Apps	(Gls)
2014–2018	Rijeka	0	(0)
2014	→ Pomorac (loan)	9	(0)
2014–2015	→ Zadar (loan)	13	(1)
2015–2016	→ Šibenik (loan)	31	(11)
2016–2017	→ Istra 1961 (loan)	31	(7)
2017–2018	→ Partizan (loan)	6	(0)
2018	→ Omonia (loan)	7	(1)
2018–2019	Inter Zaprešić	7	(1)
2019	Újpest	10	(0)
2019–2021	Partizani Tirana	40	(8)
2021	Qadsia		
2021–2022	Ballkani	19	(5)
2022–2023	Gjilani	19	(6)
2023–2025	Dukagjini	25	(2)
2025–	Vushtrria	0	(0)

International career
2016	Nigeria U23	1	(0)
- * Club domestic league appearances and goals as of 5 January 2025

Theophilus Solomon (born 18 January 1996) is a Nigerian professional footballer who plays as a forward for Kosovan club Vushtrria.

== Club career ==
=== Rijeka ===
Born in Kaduna, Solomon played at Eco Football Club of Lagos before joining Croatian side Rijeka in June 2012. He signed his first professional contract with the club in January 2014.

==== Loan to Pomorac ====
In order to gain some senior football experience, Solomon spent the initial six months of his Rijeka contract on loan at Druga HNL side Pomorac. He appeared in nine games until the end of the 2013–14 campaign, failing to score any goals.

==== Loan to Zadar ====
In August 2014, Solomon was loaned to Zadar, alongside Domagoj Pušić, until the end of the 2014–15 season. He scored a hat-trick in the first round of the Croatian Cup, on 24 September, leading his team to a 5–1 away win against Zagora Unešić. On 6 December, Solomon became the youngest foreigner to score a goal in the Prva HNL, netting the opener in an eventual 2–5 home loss to Lokomotiva Zagreb.

==== Loan to Šibenik ====
In July 2015, alongside his teammate David Nwolokor, Solomon was sent on a season-long loan to Šibenik. He was the team's top scorer and fourth-highest in the Druga HNL that season with a tally of 11 goals.

==== Loan to Istra 1961 ====
In July 2016, Solomon went on another season-long loan, this time joining newly promoted Prva HNL side Istra 1961. He finished the campaign with seven goals from 31 appearances, helping his team secure their league status.

==== Loan to Partizan ====
On 12 August 2017, Solomon was transferred to Serbian club Partizan on a season-long loan with an option for a permanent transfer.

==== Loan to Omonia ====
On 30 January 2018, he was loaned to Omonia until the end of the 2017-18 season. On 10 February he scored his first goal against Aris Limassol.

=== Inter Zaprešić ===
On 17 June 2018, Solomon was transferred to Inter Zaprešić as part of player-exchange deal.

== International career ==
In mid-March 2016, Solomon was included in the 20-man Nigeria U23 squad for a friendly against the Brazil U23s scheduled for the 24th in Rio de Janeiro. He came on as a substitute for Stanley Dimgba in the second half of the match, which Nigeria won by 1–0.
