= Jurgen Bardhi =

Albanian footballer (born 1997)

Personal information
- Date of birth: 6 November 1997 (age 29)
- Place of birth: Fushë-Krujë, Albania
- Height: 1.81 m (5 ft 11 in)
- Position: Attacking midfielder

Team information
- Current team: Vanspor
- Number: 27

Youth career
- 2011–2014: Iliria
- 2014–2015: Partizani

Senior career*
Years	Team	Apps	(Gls)
2014–2021	Partizani	169	(19)
2021–2022	Tuzlaspor	33	(4)
2022–2024	Ankara Keçiörengücü	66	(3)
2024–2026	Ümraniyespor	70	(8)
2026–	Vanspor	10	(4)

International career^{‡}
2014–2015	Albania U19	2	(1)
2015–2018	Albania U21	5	(0)
- * Club domestic league appearances and goals as of 7 November 2026 ‡ National team caps and goals as of 23 March 2018

Jurgen Bardhi (born 6 November 1997) is an Albanian professional footballer who plays as an attacking midfielder for Turkish TFF 1. Lig club Vanspor.

== Club career ==
=== Early career ===
Bardhi started his youth career at age of 13 with his hometown club Iliria in 2011. After spending 3 seasons with Iliria he moved to Partizani.

=== Partizani ===
He made his debut with Partizani on 19 November 2014 playing the full 90-minutes match against Lushnja in the Albanian Cup.

== International career ==
Bardhi received his first international call up at the Albania national under-19 football team by coach Arjan Bellaj for two friendly matches against Kosovo U19 on 13 & 15 October 2015. In the first match on 13 October Bardhi played as a starter in a 2–0 loss. Then in the second match Bardhi scored the opening goal which was succeeded by another one by Rubin Hebaj but however Kosovo U19 managed to balance the score in to 2–2.

He was called up at Albania national under-19 football team by coach Arjan Bellaj to participate in the 2016 UEFA European Under-19 Championship qualification from 12 to 17 November 2015, but since Rey Manaj was called up at the Albania national football team by coach Gianni De Biasi, Bardhi was called up as a replacement for Manaj at the Albania national under-21 football team by coach Redi Jupi for the 2017 UEFA European Under-21 Championship qualification match against Portugal U21 & Liechtenstein U21 on 12 & 16 November 2015.

Following the absence of Fiorin Durmishaj for the 2019 UEFA European Under-21 Championship qualification match against Iceland U21 on 10 October 2017 due to an injury, Bardhi was called up as a replacement by coach Alban Bushi, making his return at the Albania under-21 side after one year.

== Career statistics ==
=== Club ===
As of 15 March 2025

Club statistics
Season	Club	League			Cup		Europe (Note: Including continental competitions, such as UEFA Champions League and UEFA Europa League)		Other (Note: Including other competitions, such as Albanian Supercup)		Total	
Season	Club	Division	Apps	Goals	Apps	Goals	Apps	Goals	Apps	Goals	Apps	Goals
2014–15	Partizani	Kategoria Superiore	4	0	2	0	—		—		6	0
2015–16	Partizani	Kategoria Superiore	17	0	4	0	0	0	—		21	0
2016–17	Partizani	Kategoria Superiore	24	2	3	1	5	0	—		32	3
2017–18	Partizani	Kategoria Superiore	34	4	6	2	1 (Note: One appearance in UEFA Europa League)	0	—		41	6
2018–19	Partizani	Kategoria Superiore	30	5	4	1	2	0	—		36	6
2019–20	Partizani	Kategoria Superiore	32	3	2	0	1	0	1	0	36	3
2020–21	Partizani	Kategoria Superiore	34	5	3	0	—		—		37	5
2021–22	Partizani	Kategoria Superiore	0	0	0	0	4	0	—		4	0
Total			175	19	24	4	13	0	1	0	213	23
2021–22	Tuzlaspor	TFF 1. Lig	33	4	1	0	—		—		34	4
2022–23	Ankara Keçiörengücü	TFF 1. Lig	33	0	2	0	—		—		35	0
2023–24	Ankara Keçiörengücü	TFF 1. Lig	33	3	1	0	—		—		34	3
Total			66	3	3	0	—		—		69	3
2024–25	Ümraniyespor	TFF 1. Lig	29	1	2	1	—		—		31	2
Career total			303	27	30	5	13	0	1	0	347	32
