= William Cordeiro =

Brazilian footballer

Personal information
- Full name: William Cordeiro Melo
- Date of birth: 15 July 1993 (age 33)
- Place of birth: Itabuna, Brazil
- Height: 1.71 m (5 ft 7 in)
- Positions: Midfielder; full-back

Team information
- Current team: Besa Kavajë
- Number: 26

Youth career
- Oeste
- Marcílio Dias

Senior career*
Years	Team	Apps	(Gls)
2011–2012	Marcílio Dias	19	(1)
2013	Juventus-SC	7	(1)
2013–2015	Figueirense	24	(0)
2014	→ Hermann Aichinger (loan)	1	(0)
2015	CRB	8	(0)
2016	Barretos	0	(0)
2017	Ferroviária	0	(0)
2017–2018	Oeste	23	(0)
2018–2019	Kukësi	31	(5)
2019–2021	Partizani Tirana	50	(7)
2021–2023	Khaitan SC		
2023–2025	Laçi	58	(15)
2025–	Besa Kavajë	0	(0)
- * Club domestic league appearances and goals as of 1 June 2024

William Cordeiro Melo (born 15 July 1993), known as William Cordeiro, is a Brazilian professional footballer who plays as a midfielder or full-back for Besa Kavajë .

== Career ==
Born in Itabuna, Bahia, William Cordeiro made his senior debuts with Marcílio Dias in 2011. In November of the following year he signed for Juventus de Jaraguá, after nearly joining Avaí in July.

On 24 April 2013, William joined Figueirense. He made his first team debut for the club on 25 May, starting in a 3–2 home win against América-RN for the Série B championship.

On 6 March 2014, William was loaned to Atlético Hermann Aichinger, but returned to Figueira after only one match due to an injury.

On 10 September 2014, William made his Série A debut, playing the full 90 minutes in a 1–1 home draw against Fluminense. Ahead of the 2015 campaign, he renewed his link with the club.

== Career statistics ==
As of 20 February 2017

Appearances and goals by club, season and competition
Club	Season	League			State League		Cup		Continental		Other		Total	
Club	Season	Division	Apps	Goals	Apps	Goals	Apps	Goals	Apps	Goals	Apps	Goals	Apps	Goals
Marcílio Dias	2011	Catarinense	—		12	0	—		—		—		12	0
Marcílio Dias	2012	Catarinense	—		7	1	—		—		—		7	1
Marcílio Dias	Total		—		19	1	—		—		—		19	1
Juventus–SC	2013	Catarinense	—		7	1	—		—		—		7	1
Figueirense	2013	Série B	15	0	—		2	0	—		—		17	0
Figueirense	2014	Série A	8	0	0	0	—		—		—		8	0
Figueirense	2015	Série A	1	0	3	0	0	0	—		—		4	0
Figueirense	Total		24	0	3	0	2	0	—		—		29	0
Atlético Ibirama	2014	Catarinense	—		1	0	—		—		—		1	0
CRB	2015	Série B	8	0	—		—		—		—		8	0
Barretos	2016	Paulista A2	—		18	2	—		—		—		18	2
Ferroviária	2016	Paulista	—		—		—		—		16 (Note: Appearance(s) in Copa Paulista)	6	16	6
Ferroviária	2017	Paulista	—		4	0	1	0	—		—		5	0
Ferroviária	Total		—		4	0	1	0	—		—		21	6
Career total			32	0	52	4	3	0	0	0	16	6	103	10

== Honours ==
- Campeonato Catarinense: 2014
