= Egzon Belica =

Macedonian footballer (born 1990)

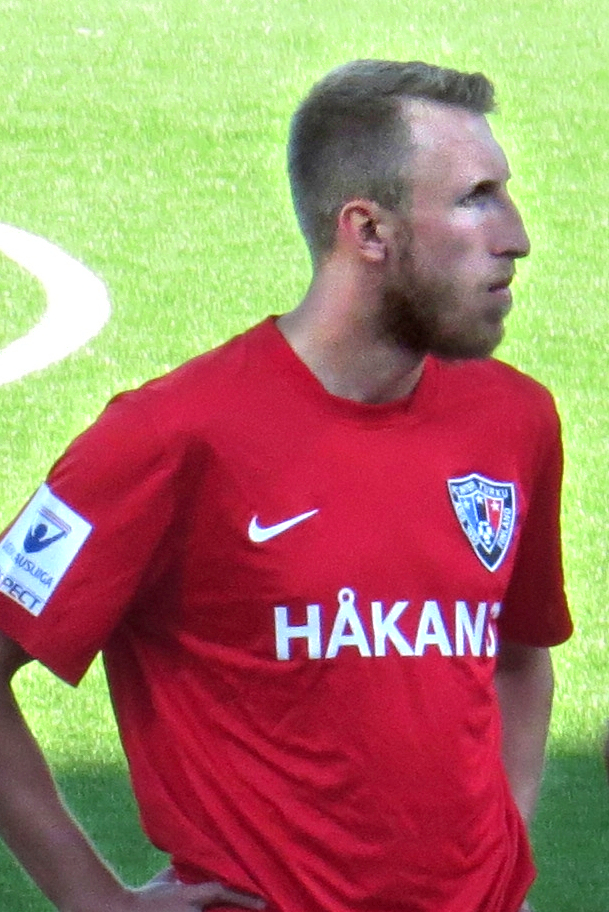
- Belica with Inter Turku in 2015

Personal information
- Date of birth: 3 September 1990 (age 36)
- Place of birth: Struga, SFR Yugoslavia
- Height: 1.88 m (6 ft 2 in)
- Position: Defender

Team information
- Current team: Rabotnički
- Number: 2

Youth career
- Karaorman
- Vllaznimi Struga
- 2010: Besa Kavajë

Senior career*
| Years | Team | Apps | (Gls) |
| 2010–2011 | Rabotnički | 17 | (0) |
| 2011–2012 | Ohrid | 17 | (0) |
| 2012–2013 | Concordia Chiajna | 11 | (0) |
| 2013–2014 | Shkëndija | 24 | (0) |
| 2015–2016 | Inter Turku | 56 | (3) |
| 2017 | Riga | 5 | (0) |
| 2018–2022 | Partizani Tirana | 150 | (5) |
| 2022—2023 | Prishtina | 21 | (0) |
| 2023–2025 | Rabotnički | 61 | (2) |
| 2025 | Shkëndija | 5 | (1) |
| 2026– | Rabotnički | 14 | (1) |
- * Club domestic league appearances and goals as of 1 June 2026

Egzon Belica (born 3 September 1990) is a Macedonian professional footballer who plays as a defender for Rabotnički.

== Career ==
=== Youth career ===
He played for local youth teams of Karaorman and Vllaznimi Struga before joining Albanian team Besa Kavajë.

=== Inter Turku ===
On 5 March 2015, Belica signed with Inter Turku in Finnish Veikkausliiga. He eventually spent two seasons with the club.

=== Partizani Tirana ===
In the first days of January 2018, Belica joined Albanian club Partizani Tirana on a 10-day trial in Antalya, Turkey. He successfully passed the trial, and on 23 January was presented as Partizani's newest player, penning an 18-month contract and taking squad number 2 for the second part of 2017–18 season. He played his first match for the club three days later, starting in a 1–0 away loss to Flamurtari Vlorë in championship matchday 17. Belica scored his first Albanian Superliga goal later 28 February, netting the third in Partizani's 6–0 hammering of bottom side Lushnja. Ultimately he managed to play in 19 league matches, all of them full-90 minutes, as Partizani managed a fifth-place finish; he also played two cup matches as Partizani was knocked-out in quarter-final by Flamurtari Vlorë in away goal rule. On 31 May, Belica's performances were rewarded as he was offered a contract extension by the club, which he accepted, with the contract reportedly containing 20% wage increase.

== Career statistics ==
As of 18 March 2025

Appearances and goals by club, season and competition
| Club | Season | League | | | Cup (Note: Includes Cupa României, Suomen Cup, Latvian Cup, Albanian Cup, Kosovar Cup, Macedonian Cup) | | League cup | | Europe | | Other | | Total | |
| Club | Season | Division | Apps | Goals | Apps | Goals | Apps | Goals | Apps | Goals | Apps | Goals | Apps | Goals |
|---|---|---|---|---|---|---|---|---|---|---|---|---|---|---|
| Rabotnički | 2010–11 | Macedonian First League | 17 | 0 | 0 | 0 | – | | 4 (Note: Appearances in UEFA Europa League) | 0 | – | | 21 | 0 |
| Ohrid | 2011–12 | Macedonian First League | 17 | 0 | 0 | 0 | – | | – | | – | | 17 | 0 |
| Concordia Chiajna | 2012–13 | Liga I | 11 | 0 | 1 | 0 | – | | – | | – | | 12 | 0 |
| Shkëndija | 2013–14 | Macedonian First League | 24 | 0 | 0 | 0 | – | | – | | – | | 24 | 0 |
| Inter Turku | 2015 | Veikkausliiga | 27 | 0 | 5 | 1 | 2 | 0 | – | | – | | 34 | 1 |
| Inter Turku | 2016 | Veikkausliiga | 30 | 3 | 3 | 0 | 4 | 0 | – | | – | | 37 | 3 |
| Inter Turku | Total | | 57 | 3 | 8 | 1 | 6 | 0 | 0 | 0 | 0 | 0 | 71 | 4 |
| Riga FC | 2017 | Virslīga | 5 | 0 | 1 | 0 | – | | 0 | 0 | – | | 6 | 0 |
| Partizani Tirana | 2017–18 | Kategoria Superiore | 19 | 1 | 2 | 0 | – | | – | | – | | 21 | 1 |
| Partizani Tirana | 2018–19 | Kategoria Superiore | 33 | 1 | 3 | 0 | – | | 1 | 0 | – | | 37 | 1 |
| Partizani Tirana | 2019–20 | Kategoria Superiore | 32 | 2 | 0 | 0 | – | | 4 (Note: Appearances in UEFA Champions League and UEFA Europa League) | 0 | 1 (Note: Appearance in Albanian Supercup) | 0 | 37 | 2 |
| Partizani Tirana | 2020–21 | Kategoria Superiore | 32 | 1 | 3 | 0 | – | | – | | – | | 35 | 1 |
| Partizani Tirana | 2021–22 | Kategoria Superiore | 34 | 0 | 8 | 0 | – | | 4 | 0 | – | | 46 | 0 |
| Partizani Tirana | 2022–23 | Kategoria Superiore | 0 | 0 | 0 | 0 | – | | 2 (Note: Appearances in UEFA Conference League) | 0 | – | | 2 | 0 |
| Partizani Tirana | Total | | 150 | 5 | 16 | 0 | 0 | 0 | 11 | 0 | 1 | 0 | 178 | 5 |
| Prishtina | 2022–23 | Kosovo Superleague | 21 | 0 | 2 | 0 | – | | – | | – | | 23 | 0 |
| Rabotnički | 2023–24 | Macedonian First League | 31 | 0 | 0 | 0 | – | | – | | – | | 31 | 0 |
| Rabotnički | 2024–25 | Macedonian First League | 23 | 2 | 0 | 0 | – | | – | | – | | 23 | 2 |
| Rabotnički | Total | | 54 | 2 | 0 | 0 | 0 | 0 | 0 | 0 | 0 | 0 | 54 | 2 |
| Career total | | | 356 | 10 | 28 | 1 | 6 | 0 | 15 | 0 | 1 | 0 | 406 | 11 |

== Honours ==
Partizani Tirana

- Kategoria Superiore: 2018–19
- Albanian Supercup: 2020

Prishtina

- Kosovar Cup: 2022–23
