= Esin Hakaj =

Albanian footballer

Personal information
- Date of birth: 6 December 1996 (age 29)
- Place of birth: Shkodër, Albania
- Height: 1.76 m (5 ft 9 in)
- Position: Left-back

Team information
- Current team: Shkëndija Haraçinë
- Number: 23

Youth career
- 2010–2015: Vllaznia Shkodër

Senior career*
Years	Team	Apps	(Gls)
2015–2016	Vllaznia Shkodër	28	(0)
2016–2017	Partizani Tirana	0	(0)
2017–2019	Teuta Durrës	55	(1)
2019–2021	Partizani Tirana	46	(1)
2021	Samsunspor	0	(0)
2021–2024	Vllaznia Shkodër	91	(4)
2024–2025	Elbasani	18	(0)
2025–2026	Vllaznia Shkodër	9	(1)
2026–	Shkëndija Haraçinë	2	(0)

International career^{‡}
2014	Albania U19	1	(0)
2016–2018	Albania U21	6	(0)
2022	Albania	2	(0)
- * Club domestic league appearances and goals as of 14 September 2026 ‡ National team caps and goals as of 29 April 2023

Esin Hakaj (born 6 December 1996) is an Albanian professional footballer who plays as a left-back for Shkëndija Haraçinë.

== Career ==
=== Vllaznia ===
Hake began his career with local side Vllaznia Shkodër, where he progressed through the academy before being promoted to the first team during 2014–15 winter break, and he was an unused substitute in an Albanian Superliga game against FK Kukësi on 24 January 2015 in a 2–1 loss. He made his professional debut the following week on 31 January against Teuta Durrës where he started the game, received a yellow card and was subsisted off in the 89th minute for Arsen Hajdari in the 2–1 loss for his side. In total he made 5 league and 1 Albanian Cup appearance during the 2014–15 campaign before becoming a regular squad member the following season as he made 23 league appearances, including 9 starts.

== International career ==
Hakaj was called up for the first time in international level at the Albania national under-21 football team by coach Skënder Gega in an Albanian Superliga selection to participate in a 3-days mini preparatory stage in Durrës, Albania from 22 to 25 February 2015.

He was called up by coach Redi Jupi in two occasions for the 2017 UEFA European Under-21 Championship qualification, first against Hungary U21 on 13 October 2015 and then against Greece U21 and Hungary U21 on 24 and 28 March 2016 respectively, but however he didn't feature in any occasion.
