= Eraldo Çinari =

Albanian footballer

Personal information
- Full name: Eraldo Çinari
- Date of birth: 11 October 1996 (age 30)
- Place of birth: Shkodër, Albania
- Height: 1.79 m (5 ft 10 in)
- Position: Forward

Team information
- Current team: Al-Jabalain
- Number: 11

Youth career
- 2010–2014: Vllaznia

Senior career*
Years	Team	Apps	(Gls)
2014–2018	Vllaznia	108	(18)
2018–2021	Partizani Tirana	74	(24)
2021–2022	Samsunspor	13	(0)
2023–2024	Shkëndija	46	(13)
2024–2025	Noah	26	(14)
2025–	Al-Jabalain	33	(7)

International career
2015	Albania U19	1	(0)
2018	Albania U21	1	(0)
- * Club domestic league appearances and goals as of 1 June 2025

Eraldo Çinari (born 11 October 1996) is an Albanian professional footballer who plays as a forward for Saudi First Division League club Al-Jabalain.

== Club career ==
Çinari made his debut for the Vllaznia on 7 December 2014 against Elbasani in a 4–1 away win at the age of 18, and he has been a first team member ever since.

He made his 100th Kategoria Superiore appearance on 15 April 2018 in the 2–0 loss to fellow relegation strugglers Teuta.

In June 2021, Çinari joined Samsunspor in the TFF 1. League, signing a three-year deal.

On 24 August 2025, Çinari joined Saudi First Division League club Al-Jabalain.

== International career ==
On 24 March 2018, Çinari received his first call-up to the Albania under-21 squad as a replacement of Keidi Bare for the 2019 UEFA European Under-21 Championship qualification match versus Slovakia. He started the match three days later and played full-90 minutes as Albania lost 4–1 at Štadión pod Dubňom, decreasing their chances to qualify.

== Career statistics ==
=== Club ===
As of 10 December 2015

Club	Season	League		Cup		Continental (Note: Including European competitions, such as UEFA Champions League and UEFA Europa League)		Other (Note: Including other competitions, such as Albanian Supercup)		Total	
Club	Season	Apps	Goals	Apps	Goals	Apps	Goals	Apps	Goals	Apps	Goals
Vllaznia	2014–15	15	2	2	0	—		—		17	2
Vllaznia	2015–16	15	5	2	0	—		—		17	5
Vllaznia	Total	30	7	4	0	—		—		34	7
Career total		30	7	4	0	—		—		34	7
