= 2019–20 KF Tirana season =

Tirana
2019–20 season
- President: Refik Halili
- Manager: Ardian Mema (until 26 October); Julian Ahmataj (26 October–9 December); Ndubuisi Egbo (from 9 December)
- Stadium: Selman Stërmasi Stadium; Arena Kombëtare
- Kategoria Superiore: 1st
- Albanian Cup: Runners-up
- Top goalscorer: League: Michael Ngoo (13); All: Michael Ngoo (13)
- Highest home attendance: 19,625 vs Partizani Tirana (28 February 2020)
Home colours	Away colours	Third colours
- All statistics correct as of 2 June 2020.

The 2019–20 season was Tirana's 3rd consecutive season in the Kategoria Superiore. The club was participated in the Kategoria Superiore and the Albanian Cup.

== First-team squad ==
Squad at end of season

Note: Flags indicate national team as defined under FIFA eligibility rules; some limited exceptions apply. Players may hold more than one non-FIFA nationality.

No.	Pos.	Nation	Player
1	GK	ALB	Ilion Lika (vice-captain)
2	DF	ALB	Marsel Ismailgeci
3	DF	ALB	Andi Lila
4	MF	ALB	Gentian Muça (captain)
6	MF	ALB	Alban Çejku
7	MF	BRA	Elton Calé
8	MF	GHA	Winful Cobbinah
9	FW	ENG	Michael Ngoo
10	MF	ALB	Edon Hasani
11	FW	KEN	Ismael Dunga
13	MF	ALB	Erando Karabeci (3rd captain)
14	MF	ALB	Eldis Kraja
15	FW	ARG	Agustín Torassa
17	DF	ALB	Albi Doka
18	MF	ALB	Andri Stafa

No.	Pos.	Nation	Player
19	DF	ALB	Tefik Osmani
20	FW	ALB	Ernest Muçi
21	MF	ALB	Jurgen Çelhaka
22	FW	ALB	Mario Morina
24	MF	GUI	Lancinet Sidibe (on loan from Besëlidhja)
27	FW	ALB	Grent Halili
28	MF	ALB	Erjon Hoxhallari (4th captain)
29	FW	ALB	Mario Beshiraj
32	DF	ALB	Kristi Vangjeli
55	MF	ALB	Idriz Batha
62	GK	ALB	Edvan Bakaj
81	GK	ALB	Pano Qirko
92	DF	ALB	Fabjan Isha
—	FW	ALB	Albion Avdijaj

== Competitions ==
Competition	First match	Last match	Starting round	Final position	Record							
Competition	First match	Last match	Starting round	Final position	Pld	W	D	L	GF	GA	GD	Win %
Kategoria Superiore	24 August 2019	29 July 2020	Matchday 1	Winners	36	21	7	8	67	35	+32	58.33
Albanian Cup	18 September 2019	2 August 2020	First round	Runners-up	9	5	2	2	20	6	+14	55.56
Total					45	26	9	10	87	41	+46	57.78

Last updated: 29 July 2020
Source: Soccerway

=== Kategoria Superiore ===
==== League table ====
Pos	Team	Pld	W	D	L	GF	GA	GD	Pts	Qualification or relegation
1	Tirana (C)	36	21	7	8	67	35	+32	70	Qualification for the Champions League first qualifying round
2	Kukësi	36	19	9	8	59	31	+28	66	Qualification for the Europa League first qualifying round
3	Laçi	36	19	7	10	61	34	+27	64	Qualification for the Europa League first qualifying round
4	Skënderbeu	36	17	7	12	42	43	−1	58	
5	Teuta	36	15	12	9	41	34	+7	57	Qualification for the Europa League first qualifying round (Note: Teuta qualified for the Europa League first qualifying round as the 2019–20 Albanian Cup winners.)

Source: Albanian Football Association, Soccerway
Rules for classification: 1) Points; 2) Head-to-head points; 3) Head-to-head goal difference; 4) Head-to-head goals scored; 5) Goal difference; 6) Goals scored; 7) Draw.
(C) Champions

==== Results summary ====
Overall								Home						Away					
Pld	W	D	L	GF	GA	GD	Pts	W	D	L	GF	GA	GD	W	D	L	GF	GA	GD
36	21	7	8	67	35	+32	70	11	4	3	35	15	+20	10	3	5	32	20	+12

Last updated: 29 July 2020.
Source: Competitive matches

==== Results by round ====
Round	1	2	3	4	5	6	7	8	9	10	11	12	13	14	15	16	17	18	19	20	21	22	23	24	25	26	27	28	29	30	31	32	33	34	35	36
Ground	H	H	A	H	A	H	A	H	A	A	A	H	A	H	A	H	A	H	H	H	A	H	A	H	A	H	A	A	A	H	A	H	A	H	A	H
Result	W	D	W	W	L	L	D	W	L	W	D	D	L	L	W	W	W	W	W	W	W	D	W	W	W	W	W	W	L	W	W	L	W	W	L	D
Position	1	3	1	1	1	3	5	2	6	3	3	4	6	8	6	4	3	2	2	2	2	2	1	1	1	1	1	1	1	1	1	1	1	1	1	1

Updated to match(es) played on 29 July 2020. Source: Competitive matches
A = Away; H = Home; W = Win; D = Draw; L = Loss

==== Matches ====
24 August 2019 1	Tirana	3–0	Luftëtari	Tirana
19:00 CEST	Dunga 30'; Halili 32'; Batha 45' (pen.); Imami (yellow card) 77'	Report	Açka (yellow card) 40'	Stadium: Selman Stërmasi Stadium; Attendance: 2,500; Referee: Kreshnik Cjapi

27 August 2019 2	Tirana	0–0	Teuta Durrës	Tirana
19:00 CEST	Batha (yellow card) 21'; Ngoo (yellow card) 30'; Çelhaka (yellow card) 55'	Report	E. Vila (yellow card) 6'; Kouros (yellow card) 25'; Aleksi (yellow card) 26'; Nikač (yellow card) 40'; Hoxha (yellow card) 57'	Stadium: Selman Stërmasi Stadium; Attendance: 3,500; Referee: Eldorjan Hamiti

31 August 2019 3	Vllaznia Shkodër	0–2	Tirana	Shkodër
19:00 CEST	Gurishta (yellow card) 23'; Sinho (yellow card) 27'	Report	Çelhaka (yellow card) 36'; Hoxhallari (yellow card) 46'; Imami (yellow card) 52'; Halili 58'; Ngoo 59'	Stadium: Loro Boriçi Stadium; Attendance: 8,000; Referee: Enea Jorgii

14 September 2019 4	Tirana	3–1	Skënderbeu Korçë	Tirana
16:00 CEST	Osmani (yellow card) 19'; Batha (yellow card) 26'; Calé (yellow card) 42'; Ngoo 45+2' (yellow card) 73'; Imami (yellow card) 52'; Halili 85' (yellow card) 86'; Hoxhallari 90'	Report	Turtulli (yellow card) 43'; Položani 67'; Pëllumbi (yellow card) 78'	Stadium: Selman Stërmasi Stadium; Attendance: 5,000; Referee: Andi Koçi

21 September 2019 5	Kukësi	2–1	Tirana	Elbasan
19:00 CEST	Abazaj 17'; Shkurti 48'; Maliqi (yellow card) 60'; Musolli (yellow card) 90+3'	Report	Halili (yellow card) 50'; Calé (yellow card) 54'; Hoxhallari (yellow card) 69'; Cobbinah 83'; Ngoo (yellow card) 86'; Osmani (yellow card) 90+2'	Stadium: Elbasan Arena; Attendance: 600; Referee: Eldorjan Hamiti

29 September 2019 6	Tirana	1–2	Partizani Tirana	Tirana
19:00 CEST	Torassa (yellow card) 46'; Çelhaka (yellow card) 76'; Hasani 79'; Batha (yellow card) 84'	Report	William 28' (yellow card) 84'; Solomon 34'; Broja (yellow card) 50'; Mala (yellow card) 55'; Belica (yellow card) 69'; Hakaj (yellow card) 90+1'	Stadium: Selman Stërmasi Stadium; Attendance: 9,000; Referee: Kridens Meta

5 October 2019 7	Flamurtari	2–2	Tirana	Vlorë
17:00 CEST	Ngoo 13' (o.g.); Nika (yellow card) 44'; Hoxhaj 90+2' (yellow card) 90+2'	Report	Hasani 4', 38'; Bakaj (yellow card) 90+1'	Stadium: Flamurtari Stadium; Attendance: 500; Referee: Blerim Ziri

19 October 2019 8	Tirana	2–1	Laçi	Tirana
17:00 CEST	Dunga 4'; Calé 44' (yellow card) 64'	Report	Nwabueze 6'; Deliu (yellow card) 40'; Fangaj (yellow card) 63'; Ymeraj (yellow card) 90+5'	Stadium: Selman Stërmasi Stadium; Referee: Ardian Beqiri

23 October 2019 9	Bylis	3–1	Tirana	Ballsh
13:00 CET	Goxha 5'; Guindo 25'; Barjamaj (yellow card) 52'; Ndreca (yellow card) 55'; Celis 71'; Murataj (yellow card) 71'	Report	Dunga 65'; Imami (yellow card) 66'	Stadium: Adush Muça Stadium; Attendance: 1,200; Referee: Andi Koçi

27 October 2019 10	Luftëtari	0–3	Tirana	Gjirokastër
13:00 CET	Prikas (red card) 25'	Report	Torassa 27' (yellow card) 53'; Ngoo 44'; Muçi (yellow card) 87'; Hasani 89'	Stadium: Gjirokastra Stadium; Attendance: 700; Referee: Eldorjan Hamiti

2 November 2019 11	Teuta Durrës	1–1	Tirana	Durrës
17:00 CET	Florent Avdyli (yellow card) 41'; Beqja (yellow card) 45'; Çyrbja (yellow card) 51'; Aleksi (yellow card) 90'; Hoxha 90+2'	Report	Ngoo 19'; Torassa (yellow card) 48' (yellow-red card) 90+2'; Hoxhallari (yellow card) 50' (yellow-red card) 76'	Stadium: Niko Dovana Stadium; Attendance: 1,200; Referee: Juxhin Xhaja

8 November 2019 12	Tirana	0–0	Vllaznia Shkodër	Tirana
18:00 CET	Batha (yellow card) 64'	Report	Gurishta (yellow card) 74'; Hygor (yellow card) 83'	Stadium: Selman Stërmasi Stadium; Referee: Kridens Meta

23 November 2019 13	Skënderbeu Korçë	2–1	Tirana	Korçë
16:30 CET	Krasniqi 18'; Daja (yellow card) 29'; Ndecky 88'	Report	Torassa (yellow card) 45+1'; Hasani 90+3'	Stadium: Skënderbeu Stadium; Attendance: 2,000; Referee: Klajdi Kola

7 December 2019 14	Tirana	1–3	Kukësi	Tirana
16:30 CET	Hasani 8' (yellow card) 30'; Batha (yellow card) 50'; Çejku (yellow card) 76'; Hoxhallari (yellow card) 80'; Calé (yellow card) 90+2'	Report	Teqja (yellow card) 42'; Gavazaj (yellow card) 42' (goal) 75'; Shkurti 65' (pen.); Rroca (yellow card) 68'; Abazaj 80'	Stadium: Selman Stërmasi Stadium; Attendance: 1,000; Referee: Enea Jorgii

13 December 2019 15	Partizani Tirana	1–2	Tirana	Tirana
19:00 CET	Bitri (yellow card) 3'; Bardhi 11'; Hyseni (yellow card) 24'; Romero (yellow card) 57'; Trashi (yellow card) 59'; Cordeiro (yellow card) 79'	Report	Batha 7'; Vangjeli (yellow card) 37'; Ngoo (yellow card) 59'; Cobbinah (yellow card) 70' (yellow-red card) 90+2' (goal) 90+1'; Çelhaka (yellow card) 75'; Ismailgeci (yellow card) 90+2'; Muça (yellow card) 90+4'	Stadium: Arena Kombëtare; Attendance: 19,000; Referee: Enea Jorgji

18 December 2019 16	Tirana	2–0	Flamurtari	Tirana
16:00 CET	Batha 65' (pen.); Torassa 74'	Report	Rrapaj (yellow card) 32'; Ribaj (yellow card) 34'; Hoxhaj (yellow card) 44'; Goçaj (yellow card) 60'; Pjeshka (yellow card) 69'	Stadium: Selman Stërmasi Stadium; Attendance: 900; Referee: Laver Alla

22 December 2019 17	Laçi	1–2	Tirana	Laç
13:00 CET	Turkaj (yellow card) 12'; Ignjatović 30'; Xhixha (yellow card) 35'; Shehu (yellow card) 45'	Report	Muçi 31', 78'; Doka (yellow card) 37'; Calé (yellow card) 38'; Çelhaka (yellow card) 57'; Hoxhallari (yellow card) 90+1'	Stadium: Laçi Stadium; Attendance: 800; Referee: Kridens Meta

22 January 2020 18	Tirana	2–1	Bylis	Tirana
17:00 CET	Calé 17'; Cobbinah (yellow card) 33'; Çelhaka (yellow card) 72'; Ngoo 90+6'	Report	Mëllugja (yellow card) 29' (yellow-red card) 72'; Hidi 64' (pen.) (yellow card) 90+8'; Goxha (yellow card) 90'; Ntephe (yellow card) 90+6'	Stadium: Selman Stërmasi Stadium; Attendance: 4,000; Referee: Enea Jorgji

26 January 2020 19	Tirana	5–1	Luftëtari	Tirana
16:00 CET	Cobbinah 14'; Batha 17'; Hoxhallari (yellow card) 25'; Ngoo 35'; Muçi 63' (pen.); Batha 75'	Report	Puci (yellow card) 53'; Çela 54'	Stadium: Selman Stërmasi Stadium; Attendance: 1,500; Referee: Klajdi Kola

2 February 2020 20	Tirana	2–1	Teuta Durrës	Tirana
17:00 CET	Ngoo 27' (yellow card) 48'; Cobbinah (yellow card) 35'; Torassa 39'; Vangjeli (yellow card) 60'; Calé (yellow card) 69'	Report	L. Vila 13'; Çyrbja (red card) 43'; Aleksi (yellow card) 43'; Hreljić (yellow card) 58'	Stadium: Arena Kombëtare; Attendance: 5,600; Referee: Kreshnik Barjamaj

7 February 2020 21	Vllaznia Shkodër	0–1	Tirana	Shkodër
18:00 CET	Shtubina (yellow card) 30'; Lika (yellow card) 62'; Ramadani (yellow card) 65'; Marku (yellow card) 81'; Adili (yellow card) 90+1'	Report	Hoxhallari (yellow card) 54'; Batha (yellow card) 83'; Cobbinah 86'	Stadium: Loro Boriçi Stadium; Attendance: 4,000; Referee: Eldorjan Hamiti

15 February 2020 22	Tirana	1–1	Skënderbeu Korçë	Tirana
17:00 CET	Calé 80'; Ngoo (yellow card) 85'; Hoxhallari (yellow card) 90+3'	Report	Bregu 28'; Imami (yellow card) 70'; Elezi (yellow card) 82'	Stadium: Arena Kombëtare; Attendance: 3,500; Referee: Kridens Meta

21 February 2020 23	Kukësi	1–2	Tirana	Tirana
18:00 CET	Musolli (yellow card) 9'; Teqja (yellow card) 20' (yellow-red card) 83'; Vangjeli 53' (o.g.); Musta (yellow card) 70'; Abazaj (yellow card) 90+7'	Report	Doka (yellow card) 30'; Vangjeli (yellow card) 34'; Batha 84'; Torassa 86'; Ngoo (yellow card) 86'; Sidibe (yellow card) 90+6'; Calé (yellow card) 90+7'	Stadium: Arena Kombëtare; Attendance: 7,600; Referee: Eldorjan Hamiti

28 February 2020 24	Tirana	5–1	Partizani Tirana	Tirana
19:00 CET	Batha 14' (pen.), 19' (pen.); Doka (yellow card) 45+1'; Calé (yellow card) 56'; Idrizaj 62' (o.g.); Muçi 81', 90+2' (yellow card) 82'; Cobbinah (yellow card) 83'; Torassa (red card) 89'; Vangjeli (yellow card) 90+1'	Report	Cordeiro 2' (yellow card) 12'; Bitri (red card) 14'; Çinari (yellow card) 73'; Hakaj (yellow card) 90+1'	Stadium: Arena Kombëtare; Attendance: 19,625; Referee: Juxhin Xhaja

4 March 2020 25	Flamurtari	0–2	Tirana	Vlorë
17:00 CET	Ribaj (yellow card) 60'; Nebihu (yellow card) 75'	Report	Vrapi 34' (o.g.); Cobbinah 88'	Stadium: Flamurtari Stadium; Attendance: 200; Referee: Klodian Shanini

8 March 2020 26	Tirana	1–0	Laçi	Tirana
17:00 CET	Ngoo 70'; Vangjeli (yellow card) 76'	Report	Selmani (yellow card) 30'; Stajila (yellow card) 60'	Stadium: Arena Kombëtare; Attendance: 3,080; Referee: Kreshnik Barjamaj

3 June 2020 27	Bylis	1–3	Tirana	Ballsh
17:00 CEST	Ntephe (yellow card) 23'; Peposhi 66'	Report	Hoxhallari (yellow card) 8'; Cobbinah 27'; Batha 45+3' (pen.); Halili (yellow card) 64'; Muça 72'; Torassa (yellow card) 90'	Stadium: Adush Muça Stadium; Attendance: 0 Referee: Eldorjan Hamiti

7 June 2020 28	Luftëtari	0–5	Tirana	Gjirokastër
17:00 CEST	Hyseni (yellow card) 48'	Report	Vangjeli 3'; Cobbinah 20'; Hasani 42'; Batha 66' (pen.); Dunga 77'	Stadium: Gjirokastra Stadium; Attendance: 0 Referee: Klodian Shanini

15 June 2020 29	Teuta Durrës	1–0	Tirana	Durrës
20:00 CEST	E. Vila 26'; Todorovski (yellow card) 30'; Avdyli (yellow card) 45+2'; Aleksi (yellow card) 50'; L. Vila (yellow card) 58'; Gruda (yellow card) 76'; Hebaj (yellow card) 82'; Kouros (yellow card) 89'	Report	Calé (yellow card) 13'; Batha (yellow card) 81'; Çelhaka (yellow card) 89' (yellow-red card) 90+5'	Stadium: Niko Dovana Stadium; Attendance: 0 Referee: Eldorjan Hamiti

19 June 2020 30	Tirana	3–0	Vllaznia Shkodër	Tirana
17:00 CEST	Hoxhallari (yellow card) 27' (yellow-red card) 45'; Torassa 30'; Ngoo 36'; Calé 63'	Report	Lekaj (yellow card) 6'; Adili (yellow card) 25'; Malota (yellow card) 25'	Stadium: Selman Stërmasi Stadium; Attendance: 0 Referee: Enea Jorgji

28 June 2020 31	Skënderbeu Korçë	1–2	Tirana	Korçë
20:00 CEST	Dwumfour (yellow card) 5'; Mensah (yellow card) 7' (goal) 9'; Dita (yellow card) 14'; Elezi (yellow card) 59'	Report	Batha (yellow card) 13'; Muça (yellow card) 65'; Doka (yellow card) 70'; Ngoo 71', 77'	Stadium: Skënderbeu Stadium; Attendance: 0 Referee: Eldorjan Hamiti

6 July 2020 32	Tirana	1–2	Kukësi	Tirana
17:45 CEST	Torassa (yellow card) 70'; Hasani (yellow card) 88'; Ngoo 90+4'	Report	Cooper (yellow card) 38' (goal) 59'; Lulaj (yellow card) 63'; Ethemi 84'	Stadium: Selman Stërmasi Stadium; Attendance: 0 Referee: Kreshnik Bajramaj

10 July 2020 33	Partizani Tirana	1–1	Tirana	Tirana
20:45 CEST	Broja (yellow card) 64'; Telushi (yellow card) 71'; Cordeiro 76'	Report	Çelhaka (yellow card) 19'; Batha (yellow card) 67'; Torassa (yellow card) 71'; Muçi 90+2'	Stadium: Selman Stërmasi Stadium; Attendance: 0 Referee: Eldorjan Hamiti

18 July 2020 34	Tirana	2–0	Flamurtari	Tirana
17:45 CEST	Muçi 20' (pen.); Vangjeli (yellow card) 34'; Ngoo (yellow card) 49'; Ismailgeci 67'	Report	Gocaj (yellow card) 20'	Stadium: Selman Stërmasi Stadium; Attendance: 0 Referee: Erjon Bastari

24 July 2020 35	Laçi	3–1	Tirana	Laç
17:45 CEST	Nwabueze 16' (pen.), 84' (yellow card) 17'; Xhixha 27'; Turkaj (yellow card) 52'; Greca (yellow card) 80'	Report	Karabeci (yellow card) 17'; Bakaj (yellow card) 17'; Muçi (yellow card) 28'; Torassa (yellow card) 78' (goal) 90'	Stadium: Laçi Stadium; Attendance: 0 Referee: Ardian Beqiri

29 July 2020 36	Tirana	1–1	Bylis	Tirana
19:00 CEST	Ngoo 22'; Karabeci (yellow card) 35'; Sidibe (yellow card) 90+3'	Report	Ndreca (yellow card) 26'; Hidi (yellow card) 45'; Sallaku 90+2'	Stadium: Arena Kombëtare; Attendance: 0 Referee: Roxhers Muska

=== Albanian Cup ===
==== First round ====
18 September 2019 First leg	Shënkolli	0−0	Tirana	Shënkoll
16:00 CEST		Report	Vangjeli (yellow card) 57'	Stadium: Shënkoll Stadium; Referee: Indrit Myrtja

2 October 2019 Second leg	Tirana	4−0 (4–0 agg.)	Shënkolli	Tirana
14:00 CEST	Imami (yellow card) 25'; Karabeci 30'; Muçi 38'; Çelhaka 41'; Cobbinah 85'	Report		Stadium: Selman Stërmasi Stadium; Referee: Blerim Ziri

==== Second round ====
29 January 2020 First leg	Kastrioti	1−3	Tirana	Fushë-Krujë
14:00 CET	Ajazi 10'; Karakaçi (yellow card) 84'	Report	Ismailgeci 47'; Muçi 60', 85' (pen.)	Stadium: Redi Maloku Stadium; Referee: Hermal Llapra

12 February 2020 Second leg	Tirana	4−0 (7–1 agg.)	Kastrioti	Tirana
13:30 CET	Halili 13'; Beshiraj 19'; Morina 62'; Kraja 78'	Report	Sefgjinaj (red card) 40'; Nuriu (yellow card) 55'	Stadium: Selman Stërmasi Stadium; Referee: Klajdi Kola

==== Quarter-finals ====
11 June 2020 First leg	Tirana	5–1	Besëlidhja	Tirana
17:00 CEST	Batha 26' (pen.); Calé 37', 68'; Torassa 62'; Sidibe 80'	Report	Hoxha 11'	Stadium: Selman Stërmasi Stadium; Attendance: 0 Referee: Orlando Kuka

24 June 2020 Second leg	Besëlidhja	1−1 (2–6 agg.)	Tirana	Lezhë
16:30 CEST	Djordjević 47'	Report	Muçi 90+2'	Stadium: Brian Filipi Stadium; Attendance: 0 Referee: Mirela Çemeri

==== Semi-finals ====
2 July 2020 First leg	Bylis	2–1	Tirana	Ballsh
17:45 CEST	Goxha (yellow card) 54'; Murataj 65', 78'; Peposhi (yellow card) 72'	Report	Hasani 20'; Lika (yellow card) 90+2'	Stadium: Adush Muça Stadium; Attendance: 0 Referee: Juxhin Xhaja

15 July 2020 Second leg	Tirana	2–0 (3–2 agg.)	Bylis	Tirana
17:30	Muçi 6'; Hoxhallari 25'; Vangjeli (yellow card) 90+2'	Report	Murataj (yellow card) 88'	Stadium: Selman Stërmasi Stadium; Attendance: 0 Referee: Klajdi Kola

==== Final ====
2 August 2020 Final	Teuta Durrës	2–0	Tirana	Tirana
20:00	Hoxha 2'; Frashëri (yellow card) 25'; Todorovski (yellow card) 27'; E. Vila (yellow card) 73'; L. Vila 78' (yellow card) 78'	Report	Ngoo (yellow card) 25'; Sidibe (yellow card) 42'; Hoxhallari (yellow card) 87'	Stadium: Arena Kombëtare; Attendance: 0 Referee: Eldorjan Hamiti

== Squad statistics ==
As of match played 2 June 2020

Appearances (Apps.) numbers are for appearances in competitive games only including sub appearances

No.	Nat.	Player	Pos.	Kategoria Superiore				Albanian Cup				Total			
No.	Nat.	Player	Pos.	Apps	Goal	Yellow card	Red card	Apps	Goal	Yellow card	Red card	Apps	Goal	Yellow card	Red card
1	(Albania)	Ilion Lika	GK	22	0	0	0	0	0	0	0	22	0	0	0
2	(Albania)	Marsel Ismailgeci	DF	11	0	1	0	3	0	0	0	14	0	1	0
2	(Albania)	Joni Nurja	DF	0	0	0	0	0	0	0	0	0	0	0	0
3	(Albania)	Andi Lila	DF	0	0	0	0	0	0	0	0	0	0	0	0
4	(Albania)	Gentian Muça	DF	17	1	1	0	3	0	0	0	20	1	1	0
6	(Albania)	Alban Çejku	MF	1	0	1	0	0	0	0	0	1	0	1	0
7	(Brazil)	Elton Calé	FW	21	3	8	0	2	0	0	0	23	3	8	0
8	(Ghana)	Winful Cobbinah	MF	24	5	4	1	2	1	0	0	26	6	4	1
8	(Albania)	Albi Gjumsi	FW	0	0	0	0	0	0	0	0	0	0	0	0
9	(England)	Michael Ngoo	FW	22	8	7	0	0	0	0	0	22	8	7	0
10	(Albania)	Edon Hasani	MF	16	6	1	0	2	0	0	0	18	6	1	0
11	(Kenya)	Ismael Dunga	FW	8	3	0	0	1	0	0	0	9	3	0	0
13	(Albania)	Erando Karabeci	MF	10	0	0	0	4	1	0	0	14	1	0	0
14	(Albania)	Eldis Kraja	MF	1	0	0	0	3	1	0	0	4	1	0	0
15	(Argentina)	Agustín Torassa	FW	18	4	4	2	3	0	0	0	21	4	4	2
17	(Albania)	Albi Doka	DF	21	0	3	0	3	0	0	0	24	0	3	0
18	(Albania)	Dorian Kërçiku	MF	4	0	0	0	1	0	0	0	5	0	0	0
18	(Albania)	Andri Stafa	MF	0	0	0	0	1	0	0	0	1	0	0	0
19	(Albania)	Tefik Osmani	DF	16	0	2	0	1	0	0	0	17	0	2	0
19	(Albania)	Kristi Malo	DF	0	0	0	0	0	0	0	0	0	0	0	0
20	(Albania)	Ernest Muçi	FW	16	5	2	0	4	3	0	0	20	8	2	0
21	(Albania)	Jurgen Çelhaka	MF	20	0	6	0	3	1	0	0	23	1	6	0
22	(Albania)	Mario Morina	FW	1	0	0	0	1	1	0	0	2	1	0	0
24	(Guinea)	Lancinet Sidibe	MF	5	0	1	0	2	0	0	0	7	0	1	0
27	(Albania)	Grent Halili	FW	19	3	2	0	3	1	0	0	22	4	2	0
28	(Albania)	Erion Hoxhallari	DF	22	1	8	1	1	0	0	0	23	1	8	1
29	(Albania)	Mario Beshiraj	MF	2	0	0	0	2	1	0	0	4	1	0	0
32	(Albania)	Kristi Vangjeli	DF	22	0	5	0	2	0	1	0	24	0	6	0
55	(Albania)	Idriz Batha	MF	25	8	0	0	1	0	0	0	26	8	0	0
62	(Albania)	Edvan Bakaj	GK	5	0	1	0	3	0	0	0	8	0	1	0
81	(Albania)	Pano Qirko	GK	0	0	0	0	1	0	0	0	1	0	0	0
81	(Albania)	Marvin Kodra	GK	0	0	0	0	0	0	0	0	0	0	0	0
92	(Albania)	Eni Imami	DF	0	0	0	0	0	0	0	0	0	0	0	0
92	(Albania)	Fabjon Isha	DF	11	0	4	0	2	0	1	0	13	0	5	0
Own goals									1				1		
Totals					47	57	4		10	1	0		57	58	4
