= 2020–21 KF Tirana season =

Tirana
2020–21 season
- President: Refik Halili
- Manager: Ndubuisi Egbo (until 12 November); Nevil Dede (13 November–25 January); Tefik Osmani (caretaker); Orges Shehi (from 27 January)
- Stadium: Selman Stërmasi Stadium; Arena Kombëtare
- Kategoria Superiore: 5th
- Albanian Cup: Second round
- Albanian Supercup: Runners-up
- UEFA Champions League: Second qualifying round
- UEFA Europa League: Play-off round
- Top goalscorer: League: Idriz Batha (9); All: Idriz Batha (9)
- Highest home attendance: 0 (all home matches) (Note: Tirana's home matches in the 2020–21 season were played behind closed doors because of restrictions during the COVID-19 pandemic. Albanian authorities only allowed spectators to return after 1 July 2021.)
- Lowest home attendance: 0 (all home matches)
Home colours	Away colours	Third colours

The 2020–21 season was Tirana's fourth consecutive season in the Kategoria Superiore. It was also the club's first season as defending league champions after winning the 2019–20 Kategoria Superiore. Tirana competed in the Kategoria Superiore, the Albanian Cup, the Albanian Supercup, the UEFA Champions League qualifying rounds and, after elimination from the Champions League, the UEFA Europa League qualifying rounds.

Tirana finished fifth in the league with 58 points from 36 matches. In Europe, the club defeated Dinamo Tbilisi in the Champions League first qualifying round, lost to Red Star Belgrade in the second qualifying round and then lost to Young Boys in the Europa League play-off round. Domestically, Tirana were eliminated from the Albanian Cup by Korabi in the second round and lost the Albanian Supercup to Teuta.

== Players ==
=== Squad information ===
As of 26 May 2021

Squad no.	Name	Nationality	Position	Date of birth (age)
Goalkeepers
97	Visar Bekaj	(Kosovo)	GK	24 May 1997 (aged 24)
—	Pano Qirko	(Albania)	GK	26 June 1999 (aged 21)
1	Ilion Lika	(Albania)	GK	17 May 1980 (aged 41)
—	Marvin Kodra	(Albania)	GK	26 May 2001 (aged 20)
—	Leon Kozi	(Albania)	GK	4 February 2003 (aged 18)
Defenders
5	Filip Najdovski	(North Macedonia)	CB	13 September 1992 (aged 28)
19	Jocelin Behiratche	(Ivory Coast)	CB	8 May 2000 (aged 21)
—	Gentian Muça	(Albania)	CB	13 May 1987 (aged 34)
4	Kristi Malo	(Albania)	CB	28 April 2001 (aged 20)
32	Kristi Vangjeli	(Albania)	CB	5 September 1985 (aged 35)
28	Erion Hoxhallari	(Albania)	LB	15 October 1995 (aged 25)
22	Jurgen Vrapi	(Albania)	LB	14 November 1998 (aged 22)
25	Omar Musaj	(Albania)	LB	15 April 2002 (aged 19)
3	Kristijan Tosevski	(North Macedonia)	RB	6 May 1994 (aged 27)
26	Marlind Nuriu	(Albania)	RB	5 July 1997 (aged 23)
Midfielders
21	Jurgen Çelhaka	(Albania)	DM	6 December 2000 (aged 20)
15	Agustín Torassa	(Argentina)	DM	20 October 1988 (aged 32)
77	Ardit Toli	(Albania)	DM	12 July 1997 (aged 23)
6	Enes Kuka	(Albania)	DM	14 January 2002 (aged 19)
—	Okseold Sefa	(Albania)	DM	23 September 2001 (aged 19)
10	Idriz Batha	(Albania)	CM	28 March 1992 (aged 29)
2	Marsel Ismailgeci	(Albania)	CM	14 March 2000 (aged 21)
55	Isaac Gyamfi	(Ghana)	CM	9 September 2000 (aged 20)
—	Alban Cejku	(Albania)	CM	23 July 2001 (aged 19)
18	Andri Stafa	(Albania)	CM	14 February 2002 (aged 19)
—	Klevi Qefalija	(Albania)	CM	12 December 2003 (aged 17)
27	Grent Halili	(Albania)	RM	24 May 1998 (aged 23)
—	Ernest Muçi	(Albania)	AM	19 March 2001 (aged 20)
23	Ibrahim Sulley	(Ghana)	AM	6 July 2001 (aged 19)
Forwards
7	Elton Calé	(Brazil)	LW	12 July 1988 (aged 32)
90	Richard Danso	(Ghana)	LW	16 September 2000 (aged 20)
14	Eldis Kraja	(Albania)	LW	22 March 2000 (aged 21)
—	Winful Cobbinah	(Ghana)	RW	6 September 1991 (aged 29)
—	Aldi Gjumsi	(Albania)	RW	15 March 2002 (aged 19)
11	Taulant Seferi	(Albania)	CF	15 November 1996 (aged 24)
—	Tim Väyrynen	(Finland)	CF	30 March 1993 (aged 28)
—	Albion Avdijaj	(Albania)	CF	12 January 1994 (aged 27)
—	Derrick Sasraku	(Ghana)	CF	12 April 1994 (aged 27)
—	Mario Beshiraj	(Albania)	CF	29 October 1999 (aged 21)
—	Luis Bircaj	(Albania)	CF	19 May 2003 (aged 18)

== Competitions ==
Competition	First match	Last match	Starting round	Final position	Record							
Competition	First match	Last match	Starting round	Final position	Pld	W	D	L	GF	GA	GD	Win %
Kategoria Superiore	4 November 2020	26 May 2021	Matchday 1	5th	36	15	13	8	41	26	+15	41.67
Albanian Cup	1 November 2020	12 November 2020	First round	Second round	2	1	0	1	4	2	+2	50.00
Albanian Supercup	31 August 2020	31 August 2020	Final	Runners-up	1	0	0	1	1	2	−1	0.00
UEFA Champions League	19 August 2020	25 August 2020	First qualifying round	Second qualifying round	2	1	0	1	2	1	+1	50.00
UEFA Europa League	1 October 2020	1 October 2020	Play-off round	Play-off round	1	0	0	1	0	3	−3	0.00
Total					42	17	13	12	48	34	+14	40.48

Last updated: 26 May 2021

=== Kategoria Superiore ===
==== League table ====
Pos	Team	Pld	W	D	L	GF	GA	GD	Pts	Qualification or relegation
3	Partizani	36	17	14	5	53	23	+30	65	Qualification for the Europa Conference League first qualifying round (Note: Vllaznia, the winners of the 2020–21 Albanian Cup, already qualified for European competition based on league position. Therefore, the Europa Conference League berth awarded to the Albanian Cup winners transfers to the fourth-placed team.)
4	Laçi	36	16	13	7	41	26	+15	61	Qualification for the Europa Conference League first qualifying round
5	Tirana	36	15	13	8	41	26	+15	58	
6	Kukësi	36	13	6	17	47	48	−1	45	
7	Skënderbeu	36	9	10	17	34	55	−21	37	

Source: Albanian Football Association, Soccerway
Rules for classification: 1) Points; 2) Head-to-head points; 3) Head-to-head goal difference; 4) Head-to-head goals scored; 5) Goal difference; 6) Goals scored; 7) Draw.

==== Results summary ====
Overall								Home						Away					
Pld	W	D	L	GF	GA	GD	Pts	W	D	L	GF	GA	GD	W	D	L	GF	GA	GD
36	15	13	8	41	26	+15	58	9	3	6	23	13	+10	6	10	2	18	13	+5

Last updated: 26 May 2021.
Source: Competitive matches

==== Results by round ====
Round	1	2	3	4	5	6	7	8	9	10	11	12	13	14	15	16	17	18	19	20	21	22	23	24	25	26	27	28	29	30	31	32	33	34	35	36
Ground	H	H	A	H	A	H	A	H	A	A	A	H	A	H	A	H	A	H	H	H	A	H	A	H	A	H	A	A	A	H	A	H	A	H	A	H
Result	W	L	L	D	D	D	W	W	D	D	D	D	D	W	L	L	W	W	L	L	W	W	W	L	W	W	D	D	W	W	D	W	D	L	D	W
Position	1	5	6	5	7	7	6	4	6	5	6	6	5	4	5	6	6	5	6	6	6	5	5	5	5	5	5	5	5	5	5	5	5	5	5	5

Updated to match(es) played on 26 May 2021. Source: Competitive matches
A = Away; H = Home; W = Win; D = Draw; L = Loss

==== Matches ====
4 November 2020 1	Tirana	2–0	Kukësi	Korçë
13:45 CET	Najdovski 6'; Najdovski 14'; Derrick Sasraku (yellow card) 22'; Najdovski (yellow card) 49'; Jurgen Vrapi (yellow card) 90'		Vesel Limaj (yellow card) 69'; Mehdi Hetemaj (yellow card) 90'	Stadium: Skënderbeu Stadium; Referee: Enea Jorgji

8 November 2020 2	Tirana	0–1	Teuta	Tirana
13:45 CET	Richard Danso (yellow card) 27'; Ardit Toli (yellow card) 32'; Vangjeli (yellow card) 45'; Najdovski (yellow card) 64'		L. Vila 32'; Alexandros Kouros (yellow card) 42'; Albano Aleksi (yellow card) 45'; L. Vila (yellow card) 82'	Stadium: Selman Stërmasi Stadium; Referee: Eldorjan Hamiti

21 November 2020 3	Vllaznia	3–2	Tirana	Shkodër
16:45 CET	Aleksandar Isaevski (yellow card) 4'; Herald Marku 28' (pen.); Herald Marku 50'; Ardit Krymi (yellow card) 53'; Erdenis Gurishta (yellow card) 59'; Mevlan Adili (yellow card) 59'; Bojan Zogovic (yellow card) 90'; Dunga 90'		Najdovski (yellow card) 28'; Muçi 46'; Batha (yellow card) 59'; Richard Danso (yellow card) 59'; Derrick Sasraku 63'; Marlind Nuriu (yellow card) 78'	Stadium: Loro Boriçi Stadium; Referee: Enea Jorgji

25 November 2020 4	Tirana	0–0	Bylis	Tirana
13:45 CET	Jurgen Vrapi (yellow card) 34'; Derrick Sasraku (yellow card) 61'		Alexandre Cardoso (yellow card) 27'; Andi Hadroj (yellow card) 31'; Xhoi Carkanji (yellow card) 62'	Stadium: Selman Stërmasi Stadium; Referee: Florjan Lata

29 November 2020 5	Kastrioti	1–1	Tirana	Fushë-Krujë
13:45 CET	Devid 34'; Indrit Prodani (yellow card) 58'; Xhuljo Mehmeti (yellow card) 70'		Muçi 8'; Ardit Toli (yellow card) 57'	Stadium: Redi Maloku Stadium; Referee: Klodian Shahini

4 December 2020 6	Tirana	0–0	Partizani	Tirana
18:00 CET	Torassa (yellow card) 37'; Najdovski (yellow card) 67'; Batha (yellow card) 90'			Stadium: Arena Kombëtare; Referee: Juxhin Xhaja

9 December 2020 7	Laçi	0–1	Tirana	Laç
13:45 CET	Nwabueze (yellow card) 5'; Erhun Obanor (yellow card) 51'		Batha 38'; Ardit Toli (yellow card) 58'; Hoxhallari (yellow card) 65'; Halili (yellow card) 72'	Stadium: Laçi Stadium

13 December 2020 8	Tirana	3–0	Apolonia	Tirana
13:45 CET	Najdovski (yellow card) 15'; Ismailgeci 49'; Batha 74'; Vangjeli (yellow card) 77'; Muçi 86'			Stadium: Selman Stërmasi Stadium; Referee: Florjan Lata

19 December 2020 9	Skënderbeu	1–1	Tirana	Korçë
13:45 CET	Uerdi Mara 42'; Drin Govori (yellow card) 47'; Shqiprim Taipi (yellow card) 70'; Belajdi Pusi (yellow card) 84'; Randy Dwumfour (yellow card) 85'		Ismailgeci (red card) 66'; Batha 71'; Torassa (yellow card) 88'	Stadium: Skënderbeu Stadium; Referee: Kridens Meta

23 December 2020 10	Kukësi	0–0	Tirana	Kukës
16:45 CET	Kenan Horic (yellow card) 90'		Ardit Toli (yellow card) 90'	Stadium: Kukës Arena; Referee: Klajdi Kola

27 December 2020 11	Teuta	1–1	Tirana	Durrës
16:45 CET	Erando Karabeci (yellow card) 62'; Dejvid Kapllani 70'; Albano Aleksi (yellow card) 90'; Ildi Gruda (yellow card) 90'		Halili 3'; Halili (yellow card) 21'; Muçi (yellow card) 60'	Stadium: Niko Dovana Stadium

30 December 2020 12	Tirana	1–1	Vllaznia	Tirana
13:45 CET	Muçi 13'; Torassa (red card) 73'		Eni Imami (yellow card) 34'; Erdenis Gurishta (yellow card) 66'; Demir Imeri 80'	Stadium: Selman Stërmasi Stadium

9 January 2021 13	Bylis	0–0	Tirana	Ballsh
13:30 CET	Arber Mehmetllari (yellow card) 20'; Franc Ymeralilaj (yellow card) 57'; Edison Ndreca (yellow card) 65'		Ardit Toli (yellow card) 37'; Richard Danso (yellow card) 68'; Richard Danso (yellow card) 73' (yellow-red card); Najdovski (yellow card) 84'	Stadium: Adush Muça Stadium

16 January 2021 14	Tirana	2–1	Kastrioti	Tirana
13:45 CET	Najdovski (yellow card) 5'; Batha 34'; Muçi 52'; Jurgen Vrapi (yellow card) 86'; Bekaj (yellow card) 90'		Indrit Prodani (yellow card) 15'; Devid 20'	Stadium: Selman Stërmasi Stadium

21 January 2021 15	Partizani	1–0	Tirana	Elbasan
18:00 CET	Bardhi (yellow card) 29'; William Cordeiro (yellow card) 35'; Theophilus Solomon (yellow card) 37'; Bardhi (yellow card) 50' (yellow-red card); Çinari 83'		Batha (yellow card) 29'; Hoxhallari (yellow card) 44'; Batha (yellow card) 55' (yellow-red card)	Stadium: Elbasan Arena

25 January 2021 16	Tirana	0–1	Laçi	Tirana
13:45 CET	Torassa (yellow card) 47'		Nwabueze (yellow card) 23'; Aleksandar Ignjatovic (yellow card) 66'; Mentor Mazrekaj 72'; Rudolf Turkaj (yellow card) 84'; Albion Marku (yellow card) 90'	Stadium: Selman Stërmasi Stadium

31 January 2021 17	Apolonia	0–1	Tirana	Fier
13:45 CET			Seferi 76'; Muçi (yellow card) 90'	Stadium: Loni Papuçiu Stadium

6 February 2021 18	Tirana	2–0	Skënderbeu	Tirana
13:45 CET	Seferi 10'; Hoxhallari 18'		Randy Dwumfour (yellow card) 68'; Alfred Mensah (yellow card) 80'	Stadium: Selman Stërmasi Stadium

13 February 2021 19	Tirana	0–2	Kukësi	Tirana
14:00 CET	Najdovski (yellow card) 30'; Richard Danso (yellow card) 35'; Isaac Gyamfi (yellow card) 86'		Ibraimi 17' (pen.); Blerim Kotobelli (yellow card) 23'; Bruno Lulaj (yellow card) 28'; Vesel Limaj 90'	Stadium: Selman Stërmasi Stadium; Referee: Eldorjan Hamiti

20 February 2021 20	Tirana	0–1	Teuta	Tirana
13:00 CET	Jocelin Behiratche (yellow card) 57'; Hoxhallari (yellow card) 75'; Hoxhallari (yellow card) 78' (yellow-red card); Väyrynen (yellow card) 80'		L. Vila 21'; Todorovski (yellow card) 39'; Alexandros Kouros (yellow card) 80'	Stadium: Selman Stërmasi Stadium

27 February 2021 21	Vllaznia	1–2	Tirana	Shkodër
13:00 CET	Haris Dilaver 4' (pen.); Fjoart Jonuzi (yellow card) 18'; Erdenis Gurishta (yellow card) 33'; Arlind Kalaja (yellow card) 85'		Batha 6'; Vangjeli (yellow card) 44'; Calé 51'; Çelhaka (yellow card) 52'; Calé (yellow card) 85'; Batha (yellow card) 89'	Stadium: Loro Boriçi Stadium

3 March 2021 22	Tirana	2–0	Bylis	Tirana
13:00 CET	Jocelin Behiratche 41'; Ismailgeci 75'		Milos Stojanovic (yellow card) 82'	Stadium: Selman Stërmasi Stadium; Referee: Mario Shabanaj

7 March 2021 23	Kastrioti	1–2	Tirana	Fushë-Krujë
13:00 CET	Devid 66'		Seferi 20' (pen.); Hoxhallari 59'	Stadium: Redi Maloku Stadium; Referee: Indrit Myrtaj

13 March 2021 24	Tirana	1–2	Partizani	Tirana
13:00 CET	Hoxhallari 39'; Hoxhallari (yellow card) 41'; Çelhaka (yellow card) 83'; Jocelin Behiratche (yellow card) 88'		Belica 28'; Bardhi 59'	Stadium: Selman Stërmasi Stadium

21 March 2021 25	Laçi	1–2	Tirana	Laç
13:00 CET	Adolf Selmani (yellow card) 31'; Mentor Mazrekaj 41'; Van-Dave Harmon (yellow card) 45'; Mentor Mazrekaj (yellow card) 78'		Çelhaka 24'; Vangjeli (yellow card) 45'; Hoxhallari (yellow card) 48'; Jocelin Behiratche (yellow card) 65'; Batha (yellow card) 67'; Ismailgeci 78'	Stadium: Laçi Stadium

4 April 2021 26	Tirana	5–2	Apolonia	Tirana
16:00 CEST	Batha 19'; Torassa 52'; Batha 65' (pen.); Ismailgeci 77'; Calé 90'		Skerdilajd Levendi 26'; Mario Vasilj (yellow card) 45'; Skerdilajd Levendi 45'	Stadium: Arena Kombëtare; Referee: Orlando Kuka

10 April 2021 27	Skënderbeu	0–0	Tirana	Korçë
13:00 CEST	Vangjel Zguro (yellow card) 37'		Hoxhallari (yellow card) 55'	Stadium: Skënderbeu Stadium; Referee: Laver Alla

17 April 2021 28	Kukësi	2–2	Tirana	Kukës
16:00 CEST	Bruno Lulaj (yellow card) 5'; Patrick Friday Eze 24'; Albin Gashi (yellow card) 79'; Ibraimi 88'		Calé (yellow card) 31'; Tosevski (yellow card) 61'; Seferi 71'; Calé 85'; Isaac Gyamfi (yellow card) 87'	Stadium: Kukës Arena

24 April 2021 29	Teuta	0–2	Tirana	Durrës
16:00 CEST			Batha (yellow card) 28'; Torassa (yellow card) 70'; Çelhaka (yellow card) 73'; Batha 78'; Hoxhallari 86'	Stadium: Niko Dovana Stadium; Referee: Olsid Ferataj

28 April 2021 30	Tirana	1–0	Vllaznia	Tirana
16:00 CEST	Batha 74'		Ardit Krymi (yellow card) 68'; Salim Cissé (yellow card) 85'	Stadium: Selman Stërmasi Stadium; Referee: Laver Alla

2 May 2021 31	Bylis	0–0	Tirana	Ballsh
16:00 CEST	Aleksandar Desancic (yellow card) 40'; Odirah Ntephe (yellow card) 77'; Arber Mehmetllari (yellow card) 90'		Çelhaka (yellow card) 49'; Hoxhallari (yellow card) 66'	Stadium: Adush Muça Stadium; Referee: Kreshnik Bajramaj

8 May 2021 32	Tirana	1–0	Kastrioti	Tirana
16:00 CEST	Ardit Toli (yellow card) 31'; Vangjeli (yellow card) 75'; Batha (yellow card) 77'; Hoxhallari 78'; Richard Danso (yellow card) 90'		Ermir Rezi (yellow card) 52'; Emiljan Cela (yellow card) 53'	Stadium: Selman Stërmasi Stadium; Referee: Florjan Lata

13 May 2021 33	Partizani	0–0	Tirana	Tirana
19:00 CEST	Rron Broja (yellow card) 31'		Vangjeli (yellow card) 26'; Najdovski (yellow card) 39'; Richard Danso (yellow card) 45'	Stadium: Arena Kombëtare; Referee: Eldorjan Hamiti

17 May 2021 34	Tirana	0–1	Laçi	Tirana
17:00 CEST	Çelhaka (yellow card) 36'; Hoxhallari (yellow card) 41'; Seferi (yellow card) 77'; Batha (yellow card) 80'		Najdovski 67' (o.g.); Alen Sherri (yellow card) 86'; Fatmir Prengaj (yellow card) 90'	Stadium: Selman Stërmasi Stadium; Referee: Kreshnik Cjapi

21 May 2021 35	Apolonia	1–1	Tirana	Fier
17:00 CEST	Ersildjo Asllanaj (yellow card) 44'; Mario Vasilj 52'; Skerdilajd Levendi (yellow card) 52'; Rubin Hebeja (yellow card) 57'; Mario Vasilj (yellow card) 72'		Seferi 46' (pen.); Isaac Gyamfi (yellow card) 57'	Stadium: Loni Papuçiu Stadium; Referee: Juxhin Xhaja

26 May 2021 36	Tirana	3–1	Skënderbeu	Tirana
17:00 CEST	Seferi 30'; Aldi Gjumsi 41'; Isaac Gyamfi (yellow card) 80'; Seferi 87'; Omar Musaj (yellow card) 89'		Abbey Agbodzie (yellow card) 33'; Alban Shabani (yellow card) 40'; Belajdi Pusi 44'; Arinaldo Rrapaj (yellow card) 64'	Stadium: Selman Stërmasi Stadium; Referee: Enea Jorgji

=== Albanian Cup ===
==== First round ====
1 November 2020 First round	Tirana	4–1	Shkumbini	Tirana
13:30 CET	Hoxhallari (yellow card) 10'; Daniel Ramazani 26' (o.g.); Vangjeli (yellow card) 33'; Jurgen Vrapi 39'; Muçi 41'; Isaac Gyamfi (yellow card) 55'; Muçi 73'; Omar Musaj (yellow card) 90'		Erjon Mustafaj (yellow card) 33'; Erjon Mustafaj 52' (pen.); Klajdi Broshka (yellow card) 66'	Stadium: Selman Stërmasi Stadium; Referee: Xhulio Agolli

==== Second round ====
12 November 2020 Second round	Tirana	0–1 (a.e.t.)	Korabi	Tirana
13:30 CET	Luis Bircaj (yellow card) 100'; Jurgen Vrapi (yellow card) 101'		Nikolin Duka (yellow card) 58'; Bekim Dida (yellow card) 68'; Nikolin Duka (yellow card) 68' (yellow-red card); Sokol Mziu (yellow card) 68'; Armend Murrja (yellow card) 85'; Skuka 119' (yellow card) 119'; Kadri Birja (yellow card) 120'	Stadium: Selman Stërmasi Stadium; Referee: Albert Doda

=== Albanian Supercup ===
31 August 2020 Final	Tirana	1–2	Teuta	Elbasan
20:00 CEST	Najdovski (yellow card) 32'; Cobbinah (yellow card) 60'; Calé (yellow card) 64'; Jurgen Vrapi 77' (yellow card) 79'; Vangjeli (yellow card) 81'		Hebaj 21'; Hebaj 34'; Kenan Hreljić (yellow card) 48'; Ildi Gruda (yellow card) 56'; Arapi (yellow card) 61'; Arapi (yellow card) 66' (yellow-red card); Frashëri (yellow card) 85'	Stadium: Elbasan Arena; Referee: Enea Jorgji

=== UEFA Champions League ===
==== First qualifying round ====
19 August 2020 First qualifying round	Dinamo Tbilisi	0–2	Tirana	Tbilisi
19:00 CEST	Luka Lochoshvili (yellow card) 23'; Giorgi Papava (yellow card) 39'; Akaki Shulaia (yellow card) 68'		Torassa (yellow card) 44'; Torassa 45'; Tosevski (yellow card) 72'; Çelhaka (yellow card) 85'; Ismailgeci 86'	Stadium: Boris Paichadze Dinamo Arena; Referee: Roomer Tarajev

==== Second qualifying round ====
25 August 2020 Second qualifying round	Tirana	0–1	Red Star Belgrade	Tirana
20:00 CEST	Vangjeli (yellow card) 32'; Çelhaka (yellow card) 43'; Najdovski (yellow card) 53'		Sékou Sanogo (yellow card) 34'; Tomané 61'	Stadium: Arena Kombëtare; Referee: Kaspar Sjöberg

=== UEFA Europa League ===
==== Play-off round ====
1 October 2020 Play-off round	Young Boys	3–0	Tirana	Bern
20:30 CEST	Christian Fassnacht 42'; Jean-Pierre Nsame 52'; Jean-Pierre Nsame 64'		Najdovski (yellow card) 19'; Torassa (yellow card) 41'; Vangjeli (yellow card) 65'; Torassa (yellow card) 67' (yellow-red card); Calé (yellow card) 86'	Stadium: Wankdorf Stadium; Referee: Sergei Karasev

== Statistics ==
=== Squad stats ===
	League	Cup	Supercup	Champions League	Europa League	Total stats
Games played	36	2	1	2	1	42
Games won	15	1	0	1	0	17
Games drawn	13	0	0	0	0	13
Games lost	8	1	1	1	1	12
Goals scored	41	4	1	2	0	48
Goals conceded	26	2	2	1	3	34
Goal difference	+15	+2	-1	+1	-3	+14
Clean sheets	16	0	0	1	0	17

Last updated: 26 May 2021

=== Top scorers ===
No.	Pos.	Nation	Name	Kategoria Superiore	Albanian Cup	Supercup	Champions League	Europa League	Total
10	MF	(Albania)	Idriz Batha	9	0	0	0	0	9
11	FW	(Albania)	Taulant Seferi	7	0	0	0	0	7
—	MF	(Albania)	Ernest Muçi	5	2	0	0	0	7
28	DF	(Albania)	Erion Hoxhallari	5	0	0	0	0	5
2	DF	(Albania)	Marsel Ismailgeci	4	0	0	1	0	5
7	FW	(Brazil)	Elton Calé	3	0	0	0	0	3
15	MF	(Argentina)	Agustín Torassa	1	0	0	1	0	2
5	DF	(North Macedonia)	Filip Najdovski	2	0	0	0	0	2
22	DF	(Albania)	Jurgen Vrapi	0	1	1	0	0	2
—	FW	(Albania)	Aldi Gjumsi	1	0	0	0	0	1
—	FW	(Ghana)	Derrick Sasraku	1	0	0	0	0	1
27	MF	(Albania)	Grent Halili	1	0	0	0	0	1
19	DF	(Ivory Coast)	Jocelin Behiratche	1	0	0	0	0	1
21	MF	(Albania)	Jurgen Çelhaka	1	0	0	0	0	1
#	Own goals			0	1	0	0	0	1
TOTAL				41	4	1	2	0	48

Last updated: 26 May 2021

=== Clean sheets ===
The list is sorted by shirt number when total clean sheets are equal.

Rnk	No.	Player	Kategoria Superiore	Albanian Cup	Supercup	Champions League	Europa League	Total
1	97	(Kosovo) Visar Bekaj	16	0	0	0	0	16
2	1	(Albania) Ilion Lika	0	0	0	1	0	1
TOTALS			16	0	0	1	0	17

Last updated: 26 May 2021
