= 2020 Albanian Cup final =

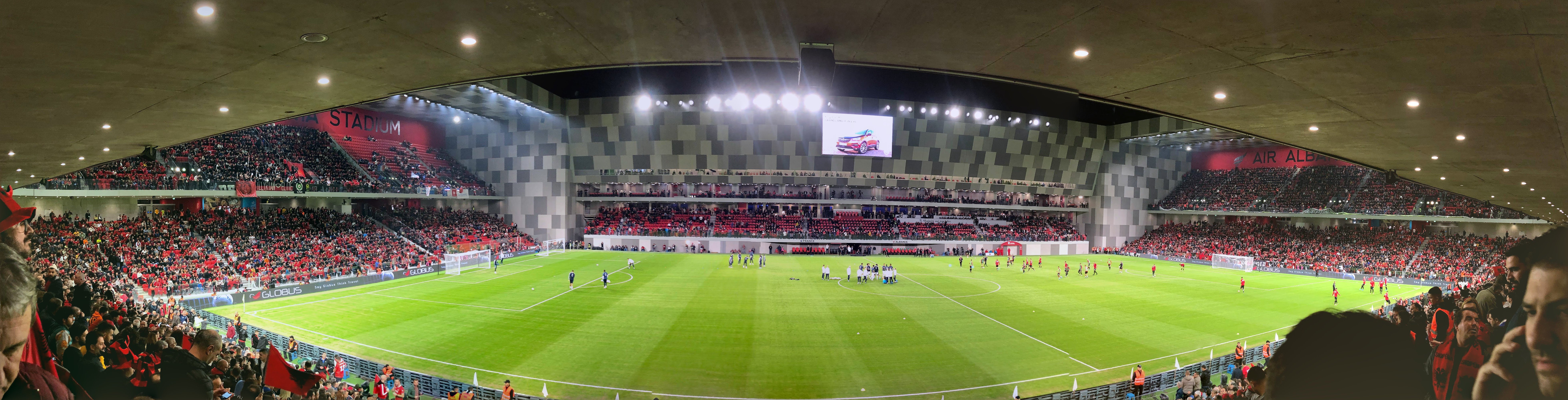
- The match was played at Arena Kombëtare in Tirana
- Event: 2019–20 Albanian Cup
Teuta	Tirana
2	0
- Date: 2 August 2020
- Venue: Arena Kombëtare, Tirana
- Referee: Eldorjan Hamiti
- Attendance: 0 (Note: The final was played behind closed doors due to the COVID-19 pandemic in Albania.)

The 2020 Albanian Cup final was a football match that was played on 2 August 2020 to decide the winner of the 2019–20 Albanian Cup, the 68th edition of Albania's primary football cup. The match was played between Teuta and Tirana at Arena Kombëtare in Tirana. Teuta won the match 2−0, their fourth time winning the Albanian Cup.

== Match ==
=== Details ===
2 August 2020
20:00

Teuta	2−0	Tirana
Hoxha 2'; Vila 78'

Arena Kombëtare, Tirana
Attendance: 0
Referee: Eldorjan Hamiti
