= Hygor =

Hygor is a given name. It may refer to:

- Hygor (footballer, born 1989), Hygor Guimarães Gonçalves, Brazilian football midfielder
- Hygor (footballer, born 1992), Hygor Cléber Garcia Silva, Brazilian football forward

== See also ==
- Igor (given name)
