= Ernest Muçi =

Albanian footballer (born 2001)

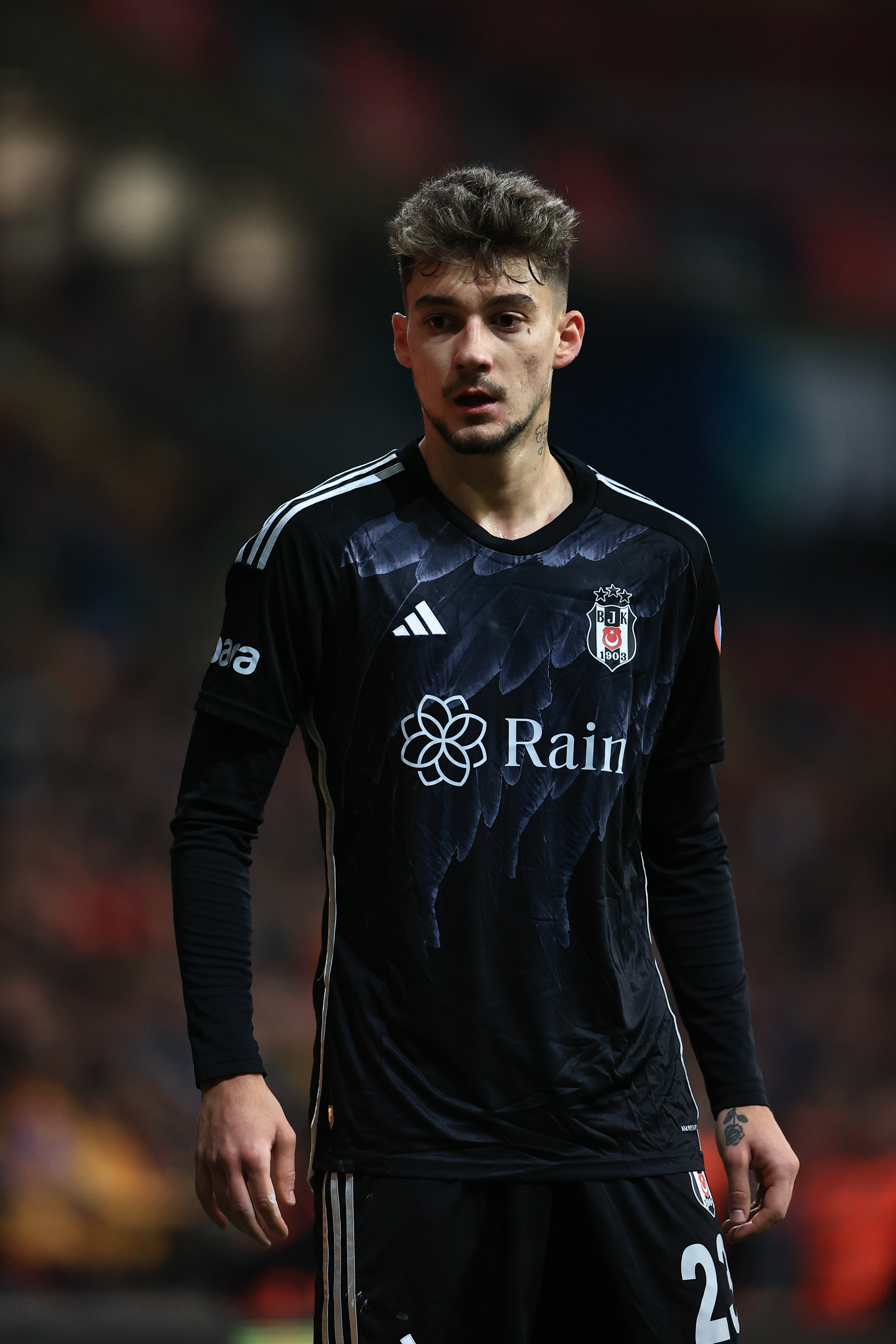
- Muçi with Beşiktaş in 2024

Personal information
- Date of birth: 19 March 2001 (age 25)
- Place of birth: Tirana, Albania
- Height: 1.80 m (5 ft 11 in)
- Positions: Attacking midfielder; winger

Team information
- Current team: Trabzonspor
- Number: 7

Youth career
- 2011–2014: Tulipanët
- 2014–2015: EZH
- 2015–2017: AF Dinamo
- 2017–2019: Tirana

Senior career*
| Years | Team | Apps | (Gls) |
| 2018–2021 | Tirana | 59 | (16) |
| 2019–2020 | Tirana B | 2 | (0) |
| 2021–2024 | Legia Warsaw | 81 | (13) |
| 2024–2026 | Beşiktaş | 41 | (7) |
| 2025–2026 | → Trabzonspor (loan) | 26 | (11) |
| 2026– | Trabzonspor | 11 | (3) |

International career^{‡}
| 2018–2019 | Albania U19 | 17 | (7) |
| 2020–2022 | Albania U21 | 11 | (4) |
| 2021– | Albania | 22 | (5) |
- * Club domestic league appearances and goals as of 22 November 2026 ‡ National team caps and goals as of 12 November 2026

Ernest Muçi (Albanian pronunciation: [ɛɾnɛst mutʃi]; born 19 March 2001) is an Albanian professional footballer who plays as an attacking midfielder for Süper Lig club Trabzonspor and the Albania national team.

Muçi began his senior career with Tirana in 2018, helping the club win promotion to the Kategoria Superiore and the league title in 2019–20. He joined Legia Warsaw in February 2021, winning the Ekstraklasa, Polish Cup and Polish Super Cup during three years in Poland. In February 2024, he moved to Beşiktaş, where he won the Turkish Cup and Turkish Super Cup. He joined Trabzonspor on loan in September 2025 and completed a permanent move in May 2026, the same month the club won the Turkish Cup.

After representing Albania at youth level, Muçi made his senior international debut in November 2021. He scored his first international goal during qualifying for UEFA Euro 2024 and made two appearances at the final tournament.

== Early life ==
Muçi was born on 19 March 2001 in Tirana, Albania. He began playing football at the age of 10 with local youth sides before joining KF Tirana in 2017.

In a December 2019 interview, Muçi recalled watching videos of Cristiano Ronaldo as a child. He also named Ronaldo as his idol and Real Madrid as his favourite club.

== Club career ==
=== Tirana ===
Muçi joined Tirana's under-17 side before being promoted to the senior squad in January 2018. He made his senior debut on 28 January, aged 16, as a substitute in a 3–0 home win over Shkumbini in the 2017–18 Kategoria e Parë. His first senior goal came on 3 March in a 4–1 victory over Shënkolli. In April, he agreed terms for his first professional contract, a two-year deal with an option for an additional season. Tirana won the Kategoria e Parë title and promotion to the Kategoria Superiore.

Muçi made his Kategoria Superiore debut on 2 September 2018, scoring in a 3–1 away defeat to Kukësi after replacing Yunus Sentamu at half-time. He made eight league appearances during the 2018–19 season, as Tirana finished seventh. Tirana also reached the Albanian Cup final. Alongside his senior appearances, he scored four goals for the under-19 side.

During the 2019–20 season, Muçi was frequently used as a substitute. On 22 December 2019, he scored twice in a 2–1 comeback victory over Laçi. On 28 February 2020, he scored twice as Tirana defeated Partizani 5–1 in the Tirana derby. In the following derby on 10 July, he scored a stoppage-time equaliser in a 1–1 draw. He finished the league campaign with seven goals in 20 appearances as Tirana won their 25th league title. He was also the Albanian Cup's top scorer with five goals as Tirana reached the final, where they lost to Teuta.

Following the departure of striker Michael Ngoo, Muçi became a regular starter in the 2020–21 season. He started Tirana's 2–0 victory over Dinamo Tbilisi in the UEFA Champions League first qualifying round on 19 August 2020. He also played in the second qualifying round, when Tirana lost 1–0 to Red Star Belgrade; he hit the post. Tirana lost the Albanian Supercup 2–1 to Teuta. Tirana subsequently entered the Europa League play-off round, where they lost 3–0 to Young Boys. On 17 October, he signed a new one-year contract with Tirana.

Muçi played in all 20 of Tirana's league matches before his departure during the 2020–21 season. In February 2021, Tirana announced his move to Legia Warsaw.

=== Legia Warsaw ===
On 23 February 2021, Muçi joined Polish champions Legia Warsaw, signing a contract until 30 June 2025. The transfer fee was reported to be €500,000, with Tirana retaining a 10% sell-on clause. He made his debut later that month as a substitute in a 2–1 away victory over Górnik Zabrze. He made six league appearances and one Polish Cup appearance during the remainder of the season, as Legia won the Ekstraklasa title.

Muçi started in the 2021 Polish Super Cup against Raków Częstochowa on 17 July 2021, which Legia lost on penalties after a 1–1 draw. A week later, he scored his first goal for Legia against Wisła Płock on the opening day of the 2021–22 Ekstraklasa season. On 4 August, he equalised in a 1–1 draw away to Dinamo Zagreb in Champions League qualifying. Legia subsequently defeated Slavia Prague to reach the Europa League group stage. Muçi provided the assist for the winning goal in a 1–0 away victory over Spartak Moscow on 15 September. He finished the season with six goals in 36 appearances across all competitions. Legia finished tenth in the league.

In the 2022–23 season, Legia, managed by Kosta Runjaić, finished runners-up in the Ekstraklasa and won the Polish Cup. He scored five goals in 32 league appearances and once in five Polish Cup appearances. In the cup final against Raków on 2 May, he was substituted before half-time after Legia had been reduced to ten men. Legia won 6–5 on penalties following a goalless draw. He also started in the Polish Super Cup against Raków on 15 July, which Legia again won on penalties.

Muçi scored in both legs of Legia's Conference League third qualifying round tie against Austria Vienna in August 2023. Legia won 6–5 on aggregate to advance to the play-off round. They then defeated Midtjylland on penalties to qualify for the group stage. On 21 September, Muçi scored twice in a 3–2 group-stage victory over Aston Villa. He scored again in the return fixture on 30 November, which Legia lost 2–1. Legia finished second in their group and advanced to the knockout phase. Before moving to Beşiktaş in February 2024, he scored nine goals in 34 appearances during the 2023–24 season. His overall record for Legia was 21 goals in 114 appearances.

=== Beşiktaş ===
==== 2023–24 season ====
On 9 February 2024, Süper Lig club Beşiktaş announced Muçi's signing on a three-and-a-half-year contract for a fee of €10 million, with Legia entitled to 10% of the net profit from a subsequent transfer. He made his debut three days later in a goalless draw against Kayserispor. His first goal came on 25 February in a 2–0 away victory over İstanbulspor. On 7 May, Muçi scored the only goal in the second leg of the Turkish Cup semi-final against Ankaragücü, sending Beşiktaş through to the final. He started the final against Trabzonspor on 23 May as Beşiktaş won 3–2. He scored three league goals that season.

==== 2024–25 season ====
On 3 August 2024, Beşiktaş won the Turkish Super Cup with a 5–0 victory over Galatasaray. Muçi did not play in the match. He initially struggled to secure a starting place under new manager Giovanni van Bronckhorst following the arrival of Rafa Silva. On 18 August, he came on as a late substitute against Antalyaspor, scoring in stoppage time in a 4–2 victory. He provided an assist in the 5–1 second-leg victory over Lugano in the Europa League play-off, as Beşiktaş advanced to the league phase with an 8–4 aggregate victory. After Beşiktaş's 3–1 Europa League defeat to Eintracht Frankfurt on 3 October, he was among the players booed by supporters; the club subsequently issued a public message of support. Later that month, van Bronckhorst expressed confidence in him and praised his response to a difficult start to the season. Muçi scored against Galatasaray on 28 October, Kasımpaşa on 2 November and Malmö FF on 6 November.

He scored in a 1–1 draw against Çaykur Rizespor on 3 January 2025. After Ole Gunnar Solskjær became manager later that month, Muçi started in a 4–1 Europa League victory over Athletic Bilbao. Beşiktaş were eliminated from the competition after losing their final league-phase match to Twente. On 3 April, Muçi scored in the Turkish Cup quarter-final against Göztepe, but Beşiktaş lost 3–1. Muçi suffered a thigh injury against İstanbul Başakşehir on 12 April. He returned on 18 May against Alanyaspor and provided the assist for Beşiktaş's equaliser in a 1–1 draw. Beşiktaş finished fourth in the Süper Lig.

==== 2025–26 season ====
Muçi appeared in both legs of Beşiktaş's Conference League third qualifying round tie against St Patrick's Athletic, which the club won 7–3 on aggregate. He also played in the second leg of the play-off against Lausanne-Sport on 28 August 2025, when Beşiktaş were eliminated following a 1–0 home defeat.

=== Trabzonspor ===
==== 2025–26 season ====
On 6 September 2025, Muçi joined Trabzonspor on loan until the end of the 2025–26 season, with an option to make the transfer permanent. The loan fee was €1 million and the purchase option was set at €8.5 million, both plus VAT. He made his debut on 14 September in a 1–0 away defeat to Fenerbahçe. After starting against Fenerbahçe and Gaziantep, he lost his place in Fatih Tekke's starting lineup. On 24 November, Muçi scored twice, including the stoppage-time winner, in a 4–3 away victory over Başakşehir. He scored in each of Trabzonspor's next four league matches, bringing his tally to seven goals in five games. His free kick against Konyaspor and second goal against Göztepe won the Süper Lig's Goal of the Month awards for November and December respectively.

In January 2026, Muçi scored twice in a 6–1 Turkish Cup win over İstanbulspor. He also scored the stoppage-time winner in a 2–1 league victory over Kocaelispor. On 23 April, he converted the decisive penalty in the cup quarter-final shoot-out against Samsunspor. On 9 May, he scored the winner in a 2–1 victory over his parent club Beşiktaş. A suspension ruled him out of the final league match, leaving him with 11 league goals for the season. Four days later, he scored a stoppage-time winner against Gençlerbirliği in the cup semi-final. On 20 May, Trabzonspor exercised the purchase option in Muçi's loan agreement. On 22 May, he started the Turkish Cup final as Trabzonspor defeated Konyaspor 2–1 to win the trophy for the tenth time. On 5 June, the club agreed a three-year contract with him, with an option for a further season.

==== 2026–27 season ====
In August 2026, Goal.com reported that Muçi had given up his number 10 shirt to Mohamed Salah. On 23 August, he exchanged passes with Salah in the build-up to the winning goal in Trabzonspor's 2–1 victory over Başakşehir. Following their elimination by Ferencváros in the Europa League play-off round, Trabzonspor entered the Conference League league phase. On 6 September, Muçi scored his first league goal of the season in a 5–0 victory over Gençlerbirliği, following an assist from Salah. On 10 October, he scored the opening goal in a 3–0 away victory over Samsunspor. Five days later, he provided an assist after coming on as a substitute in a 4–2 away victory over KuPS in the Conference League.

== International career ==
=== Youth ===
Muçi began his international career with Albania U19, scoring his first goal on 8 September 2018 in a 1–0 friendly home win over Iceland. He made 17 appearances for the under-19 side and scored seven goals.

He made his under-21 debut in September 2020, scoring twice in a 5–1 victory over Austria in European Under-21 Championship qualifying. On 7 October 2021, he scored another brace in a 2–0 win over Andorra. Across two qualifying campaigns, he made 11 appearances.

=== Senior ===
Muçi received his first call-up to the senior national team from Edoardo Reja on 28 August 2021 for the September 2022 FIFA World Cup qualifiers. He made his senior debut on 15 November 2021, coming on as a second-half substitute for Taulant Seferi in a 1–0 home victory over Andorra.

Under Sylvinho, Muçi made four substitute appearances during UEFA Euro 2024 qualifying. On 20 June 2023, he scored his first senior international goal in stoppage time in a 3–1 away victory over the Faroe Islands. He scored again in a 2–0 friendly win against Bulgaria on 17 October. Albania finished top of their qualifying group with 15 points and qualified for the finals.

Muçi scored in a warm-up friendly against Liechtenstein on 3 June 2024. He was subsequently named in Albania's final 26-man squad for UEFA Euro 2024. He made two appearances at the tournament, both as a late substitute, in defeats to Italy and Spain, with Albania finishing bottom of their group. Muçi made three appearances in the 2024–25 UEFA Nations League, playing in both matches against Czechia and the home match against Ukraine.

During 2026 FIFA World Cup qualifying, Muçi made one appearance in June 2025. He missed the September matches through injury and was then left out of the squad for the October and November matches. He returned to the squad for Albania's play-off semi-final against Poland in March 2026. Albania lost 2–1 and were eliminated. After missing the June 2026 friendlies through injury, Muçi returned to the squad under Rolando Maran in September. On 26 September 2026, Muçi scored in first-half stoppage time in Albania's 2–0 home victory over Belarus in the UEFA Nations League.

== Personal life ==
In 2024, Muçi was reported to be in a relationship with Klea Verri, then a basketball player for Tirana. They had reportedly been together since high school. The couple have a daughter, born in October 2025. In July 2026, it was reported that they were expecting their second child, a boy.

== Career statistics ==
=== Club ===
As of match played 22 November 2026

Appearances and goals by club, season and competition
| Club | Season | League | | | National cup (Note: Includes Albanian Cup, Polish Cup, Turkish Cup) | | Continental | | Other | | Total | |
| Club | Season | Division | Apps | Goals | Apps | Goals | Apps | Goals | Apps | Goals | Apps | Goals |
|---|---|---|---|---|---|---|---|---|---|---|---|---|
| Tirana | 2017–18 | Kategoria e Parë | 11 | 3 | 0 | 0 | — | | — | | 11 | 3 |
| Tirana | 2018–19 | Kategoria Superiore | 8 | 1 | 3 | 0 | — | | — | | 11 | 1 |
| Tirana | 2019–20 | Kategoria Superiore | 20 | 7 | 7 | 5 | — | | — | | 27 | 12 |
| Tirana | 2020–21 | Kategoria Superiore | 20 | 5 | 1 | 2 | 3 (Note: Two appearances in UEFA Champions League, one appearance in UEFA Europa League) | 0 | 1 (Note: Appearance in Albanian Supercup) | 0 | 25 | 7 |
| Tirana | Total | | 59 | 16 | 11 | 7 | 3 | 0 | 1 | 0 | 74 | 23 |
| Tirana B | 2019–20 | Kategoria e Dytë | 2 | 0 | — | | — | | — | | 2 | 0 |
| Legia Warsaw | 2020–21 | Ekstraklasa | 6 | 0 | 1 | 0 | — | | — | | 7 | 0 |
| Legia Warsaw | 2021–22 | Ekstraklasa | 24 | 4 | 3 | 1 | 8 (Note: Three appearances and one goal in UEFA Champions League, five appearances in UEFA Europa League) | 1 | 1 (Note: Appearance in Polish Super Cup) | 0 | 36 | 6 |
| Legia Warsaw | 2022–23 | Ekstraklasa | 32 | 5 | 5 | 1 | — | | — | | 37 | 6 |
| Legia Warsaw | 2023–24 | Ekstraklasa | 19 | 4 | 2 | 0 | 12 (Note: Appearances in UEFA Conference League) | 5 | 1 | 0 | 34 | 9 |
| Legia Warsaw | Total | | 81 | 13 | 11 | 2 | 20 | 6 | 2 | 0 | 114 | 21 |
| Beşiktaş | 2023–24 | Süper Lig | 13 | 3 | 4 | 1 | — | | — | | 17 | 4 |
| Beşiktaş | 2024–25 | Süper Lig | 27 | 4 | 3 | 2 | 8 (Note: Appearances in UEFA Europa League) | 1 | 0 | 0 | 38 | 7 |
| Beşiktaş | 2025–26 | Süper Lig | 1 | 0 | — | | 5 (Note: Three appearances in UEFA Conference League, two appearances in UEFA Europa League) | 0 | — | | 6 | 0 |
| Beşiktaş | Total | | 41 | 7 | 7 | 3 | 13 | 1 | 0 | 0 | 61 | 11 |
| Trabzonspor (loan) | 2025–26 | Süper Lig | 26 | 11 | 8 | 4 | — | | 1 (Note: Appearance in Turkish Super Cup) | 0 | 35 | 15 |
| Trabzonspor | 2026–27 | Süper Lig | 11 | 3 | 0 | 0 | 4 (Note: Two appearances in UEFA Europa League, two appearance in UEFA Conference League) | 0 | — | | 15 | 3 |
| Trabzonspor | Trabzonspor total | | 37 | 14 | 8 | 4 | 4 | 0 | 1 | 0 | 50 | 18 |
| Career total | | | 220 | 50 | 37 | 16 | 40 | 7 | 4 | 0 | 301 | 73 |

=== International ===
As of match played 12 November 2026

Appearances and goals by national team and year
| National team | Year | Apps | Goals |
|---|---|---|---|
| Albania | 2021 | 1 | 0 |
| Albania | 2022 | 1 | 0 |
| Albania | 2023 | 5 | 2 |
| Albania | 2024 | 8 | 1 |
| Albania | 2025 | 1 | 0 |
| Albania | 2026 | 6 | 2 |
| Total | | 22 | 5 |

Scores and results list Albania's goal tally first, score column indicates score after each Muçi goal.

List of international goals scored by Ernest Muçi
| No. | Date | Venue | Opponent | Score | Result | Competition | Ref. |
|---|---|---|---|---|---|---|---|
| 1 | 20 June 2023 | Tórsvøllur, Tórshavn, Faroe Islands | Faroe Islands | 3–1 | 3–1 | UEFA Euro 2024 qualifying | |
| 2 | 17 October 2023 | Arena Kombëtare, Tirana, Albania | Bulgaria | 2–0 | 2–0 | Friendly | |
| 3 | 3 June 2024 | Haladás Sportkomplexum, Szombathely, Hungary | Liechtenstein | 3–0 | 3–0 | Friendly | |
| 4 | 26 September 2026 | Arena Kombëtare, Tirana, Albania | Belarus | 2–0 | 2–0 | 2026–27 UEFA Nations League C | |
| 5 | 12 November 2026 | Arena Kombëtare, Tirana, Albania | Finland | 1–0 | 2–0 | 2026–27 UEFA Nations League C | |

== Honours ==
Tirana

- Kategoria Superiore: 2019–20
- Kategoria e Parë: 2017–18
- Albanian Cup runner-up: 2018–19, 2019–20
- Albanian Supercup runner-up: 2020

Legia Warsaw

- Ekstraklasa: 2020–21
- Polish Cup: 2022–23
- Polish Super Cup: 2023; runner-up: 2021

Beşiktaş

- Turkish Cup: 2023–24
- Turkish Super Cup: 2024

Trabzonspor

- Turkish Cup: 2025–26

Individual

- Albanian Cup top scorer: 2019–20
- Süper Lig Goal of the Month: November 2025, December 2025
