= Andri Stafa =

Albanian footballer

Personal information
- Date of birth: 14 February 2002 (age 24)
- Place of birth: Tirana, Albania
- Height: 1.83 m (6 ft 0 in)
- Position: Midfielder

Team information
- Current team: Bashkimi
- Number: 24

Youth career
- 2013–2020: Tirana

Senior career*
Years	Team	Apps	(Gls)
2020–2022	Tirana	4	(0)
2020–2021	→ Tirana U-21	9	(1)
2021–2022	→ Burreli (loan)	24	(3)
2022–2023	Llapi	13	(0)
2023–2024	Liria	32	(2)
2024–2025	Besa Kavajë	27	(0)
2025–2026	Liria		
2026–	Bashkimi	5	(0)

International career^{‡}
2018–2020	Albania U17	5	(0)
- * Club domestic league appearances and goals as of 14 September 2026 ‡ National team caps and goals as of 27 July 2020

Andri Stafa (born 14 February 2002) is an Albanian footballer who plays as a midfielder for Bashkimi.

== Career ==
=== Early career ===
In August 2019, while playing with the KF Tirana youth academy, Stafa went on trial with Danish club Esbjerg fB.

=== KF Tirana ===
A graduate of the club's youth academy, Stafa signed his first professional contract in January 2020, penning a three-year deal with the club. In June 2020, he made his league debut, coming on as a 70th-minute substitute for Jurgen Çelhaka in a 5–0 away victory over Luftëtari. However, this wasn't his first competitive appearance for the club. On 25 September 2018, Stafa tallied 32 minutes off the bench in a 4–0 victory over KF Iliria during Albanian Cup play, successfully making his debut for the club in an official competition.

=== Llapi ===
In June 2022, Stafa joined Kosovan club Llapi on a three-year deal. Stafa stated that he joined the club because of their emphasis on promoting young talent, and that he hoped to become league champions with Llapi.

== Honours ==
Tirana

- Albanian Superliga: 2019–20
