= Edon Hasani =

Albanian footballer

Personal information
- Full name: Edon Hasani
- Date of birth: 9 January 1992 (age 34)
- Place of birth: Shkodër, Albania
- Height: 1.81 m (5 ft 11 in)
- Position: Midfielder

Team information
- Current team: KF Besa Kavajë
- Number: 16

Youth career
- 2005–2009: Vllaznia Shkodër

Senior career*
Years	Team	Apps	(Gls)
2009–2012	Vllaznia Shkodër	36	(1)
2012–2014	Litex Lovech	9	(0)
2013	→ Ceahlăul (loan)	1	(0)
2014	→ Poli Timișoara (loan)	5	(0)
2014–2017	Kukësi	67	(5)
2017–2018	Vllaznia Shkodër	14	(2)
2018	Sepahan	6	(0)
2018–2020	Tirana	58	(19)
2020	→Tirana B	1	(0)
2020	Ankara Keçiörengücü SK	0	(0)
2020–2021	Partizani	0	(0)
2020–2021	→Partizani B	3	(0)
2021–2023	KS Kastrioti	59	(4)
2023–2025	AF Elbasani	46	(5)
2025– 2026	KF Besa Kavajë	25	(1)

International career^{‡}
2008–2009	Albania U17	3	(0)
2009-2010	Albania U18	2	(0)
2009–2010	Albania U19	10	(0)
2012-2013	Albania U21	3	(0)
- * Club domestic league appearances and goals as of 1 June 2024 ‡ National team caps and goals as of 25 March 2014

Edon Hasani (born 9 January 1992) is an Albanian professional footballer who plays as a midfielder for KF Besa Kavajë.

== Club career ==
=== Vllaznia Shkodër ===
Hasani made his professional debut for Vllaznia Shkodër on 17 April 2009 against Skënderbeu Korçë, replacing Ansi Nika in the 75th minute.

Hasani made his European debut for Vllaznia Shkodër in a Europa League qualifying match against Birkirkara on 30 July 2011, coming on as an 88th-minute substitute in the 1–0 win. He played another five minutes in the returning leg where Vllaznia Shkodër progressed with the aggregate 2–1. Hasani would play another two matches as a late substitute in the next round against Thun in an eventual 2–1 aggregate exit.

=== Litex, FC Ceahlăul, and ACS Poli Timișoara ===
On 25 August 2012, Hasani joined Bulgarian A PFG club Litex Lovech. After 9 games played in Bulgaria, in the summer of 2013 he joined FC Ceahlăul in the Romanian Liga I, where he played only one game until January 2014 when he moved to ACS Poli Timișoara, another Liga I team.

=== Kukësi ===
Hasani returned to Albania in the summer of 2014 and signed a one-year contract with Kukësi on 29 July 2014, with the option of an extension of a further two years. On 25 August 2014, Hasani made his Kukësi debut in the team's opening league match of 2014–15 Albanian Superliga against his former side Vllaznia Shkodër, playing 88 minutes in a 2–1 away win. In the next matchday he made his home debut by helping his side to beat the newcomers of Elbasani.

Hasani scored his maiden goal for Kukësi on 19 November 2014 during the 5–2 home win against Pogradeci in the first leg of 2014–15 Albanian Cup's second round. He ended his first season with Kukësi by playing 26 league matches, mostly of them as a starter, and 7 cup matches, with Kukësi who finished as runner-up in both league and cup. In the Albanian Cup final against Laçi on 29 May 2015, he scored his second cup goal and the temporary equalizer in an eventual 2–1 loss.

Hasani made his 100th Albanian Superliga appearance on 5 March 2017 in the 1–1 draw at Flamurtari Vlorë where he played for 84 minutes. Later that month, Hasani announced his departure from the club. He terminated the contract after falling out with Kukësi management. Kukësi finished 2016–17 season by winning their first ever championship.

=== Return to Vllaznia Shkodër ===
On 29 July 2017, after weeks of negotiations, Hasani officially returned to his boyhood club by signing a two-year contract. He was handed squad number 10, and made his return debut on 10 September against newbie Lushnja, scoring a tap-in in an eventual 2–0 away win. Hasani left a struggling Vllaznia in December 2017 after receiving an offer from Sepahan.

=== Sepahan ===
On 19 December 2017, Hasani moved for the first time outside continent to join Sepahan on a one-and-a-half-year contract.

=== Tirana ===
On 23 July 2018, Hasani returned in Albania where he joined Tirana by penning a contract until June 2020.

He concluded his first season at Tirana by scoring an impressive 12 goals in 32 league appearances, his personal best, being just one goal short of the Albanian Superliga Golden Boot winner. Tirana retained their top flight status only in the last matchday, winning 3–0 at home versus Flamurtari Vlorë, with Hasani scoring the third goal of his side.

On 19 July 2019, during the summer training camp in Ohër, North Macedonia, Hasani was involved in a confrontation with his new teammate Agustín Torassa; after some strong language, the players were separated by the rest of the squad after the conflict started to go physical. The midfielder left the training ground and immediately asked for a transfer request. The following day, Hasani was suspended by Tirana.

Hasani had an overall good campaign during the 2019–20 Albanian Superliga season, scoring 7 goals in 25 appearances, as Tirana won the championship title for the 25th time in their 100th anniversary. Despite being an undisputed starter in the first part of the season, he lost his place in the second part of the season, following an injury and the appointment of Ndubuisi Egbo, who did not saw Hasani as a starter, instead preferring Elton Calé and Agustín Torassa. On 9 August, with his contract expired, Hasani announced his departure from the club after two seasons.

== International career ==
Hasani made his international debut with Albania U19 in a UEFA European Under-19 Championship match against Italy U19 on 13 November 2009, playing 59 minutes before leaving the field in place of Armando Vajushi in an eventual 5–0 defeat. He would play two full-90 minutes against Republic of Ireland U19 and San Marino U19 as Albania failed to qualify in the Elite round.

== Career statistics ==
As of 2 August 2018

Club	Season	League			Cup		Europe		Other		Total	
Club	Season	Division	Apps	Goals	Apps	Goals	Apps	Goals	Apps	Goals	Apps	Goals
Vllaznia Shkodër	2007–08	Albanian Superliga	4	0	0	0	—		—		4	0
Vllaznia Shkodër	2008–09	Albanian Superliga	1	0	2	1	0	0	—		3	1
Vllaznia Shkodër	2009–10	Albanian Superliga	2	0	2	0	0	0	—		4	0
Vllaznia Shkodër	2010–11	Albanian Superliga	27	0	3	0	—		—		30	0
Vllaznia Shkodër	2011–12	Albanian Superliga	7	1	7	2	4 (Note: All appearance(s) in UEFA Europa League)	0	—		23	1
Vllaznia Shkodër	Total		41	1	13	3	4	0	—		59	4
Litex Lovech	2012–13	First League	9	0	0	0	—		—		9	0
Ceahlăul	2013–14	Liga I	1	0	1	0	—		—		2	0
Poli Timișoara	2013–14	Liga I	5	0	0	0	—		—		5	0
Kukësi	2014–15	Albanian Superliga	26	0	7	2	—		—		33	2
Kukësi	2015–16	Albanian Superliga	22	5	4	1	6	0	—		32	6
Kukësi	2016–17	Albanian Superliga	19	0	2	0	0	0	1 (Note: Appearance in Albanian Supercup)	0	22	0
Kukësi	Total		67	5	13	3	6	0	1	0	87	8
Vllaznia Shkodër	2017–18	Albanian Superliga	14	2	1	0	—		—		15	2
Sepahan	2017–18	Persian Gulf Pro League	6	0	0	0	—		—		6	0
Tirana	2018–19	Albanian Superliga	33	12	6	1	—		—		39	13
Tirana	2019–20	Albanian Superliga	25	7	7	1	—		—		32	8
Tirana	Total		58	19	13	2	—		—		71	21
Career total			201	27	41	8	10	0	1	0	253	35

== Honours ==
KF Vllaznia

- Albanian Cup: 2007–08

FK Kukësi

- Albanian Superliga: 2016–17
- Albanian Cup: 2015–16
- Albanian Supercup: 2016

KF Tirana

- Albanian Superliga: 2019–20

AF Elbasani

- Albanian First Division: 2023–24 Kategoria e Parë
