= Mario Beshiraj =

Albanian footballer

Personal information
- Date of birth: 29 October 1999 (age 27)
- Place of birth: Tirana, Albania
- Height: 1.82 m (6 ft 0 in)
- Position: Forward

Team information
- Current team: Skënderbeu Korçë
- Number: 99

Youth career
- 2005–2018: Tirana

Senior career*
Years	Team	Apps	(Gls)
2016–2018	Tirana B	3	(1)
2019	Ermis Aradippou	0	(0)
2019	Tirana B	8	(2)
2019–2022	Tirana	12	(1)
2020	→ Vora(loan)	8	(1)
2021–2022	→ Tirana U21	13	(7)
2022–2023	Korabi Peshkopi	22	(8)
2023–2024	Kukësi	42	(10)
2024–2026	Teuta Durrës	34	(6)
2026–	Skënderbeu Korçë	12	(6)
- * Club domestic league appearances and goals as of 17:04, 22 September 2024 (UTC)

Mario Beshiraj (born 25 October 1999) is an Albanian footballer who plays as a forward for Skënderbeu Korçë in the Kategoria e Parë.

== Honours ==
Tirana

- Albanian Superliga: 2019–20, 2021–22
