= Alban Çejku =

Albanian footballer

Personal information
- Full name: Alban Çejku
- Date of birth: 23 July 2001 (age 25)
- Place of birth: Tirana, Albania
- Position: Central midfielder

Team information
- Current team: Teuta Durrës
- Number: 16

Youth career
- 2011–: Tirana

Senior career*
Years	Team	Apps	(Gls)
2019–2022	Tirana	1	(0)
2022–	Teuta Durrës	8	(0)
- * Club domestic league appearances and goals as of 18 October 2023 ‡ National team caps and goals as of 19 March 2020

Alban Çejku (born 23 July 2001) is an Albanian professional footballer who plays as a left back for Albanian club Teuta Durrës.

== Career statistics ==
=== Club ===
As of 11 March 2020

Club statistics
Club	Season	League			Cup		Europe (Note: Including continental competitions, such as UEFA Champions League and UEFA Europa League)		Other (Note: Including other competitions, such as Albanian Supercup)		Total	
Club	Season	Division	Apps	Goals	Apps	Goals	Apps	Goals	Apps	Goals	Apps	Goals
Tirana	2019–20	Albanian Superliga	1	0	0	0	—		—		1	0
Career total			1	0	0	0	—		—		1	0

== Honours ==
Tirana

- Albanian Superliga: 2019–20
