= Lancinet Sidibe =

Guinean footballer

Personal information
- Date of birth: 1 January 1997 (age 29)
- Place of birth: Kankan, Guinea
- Height: 6 ft 2 in (1.88 m)
- Positions: Centre-back; defensive midfielder

Team information
- Current team: Flamurtari
- Number: 21

Senior career*
Years	Team	Apps	(Gls)
2015–2016	Luzi	12	(0)
2016–2020	Besëlidhja	68	(0)
2017–2018	→ Flamurtari (loan)	32	(1)
2018–2019	→ Teuta (loan)	30	(1)
2019–2020	→ Tirana (loan)	13	(0)
2020–2021	Ermis Aradippou	29	(0)
2021–2022	Dinamo City	29	(0)
2022	Sektzia Ness Ziona		
2022–2023	Naft Missan		
2023–	Flamurtari	22	(2)
- * Club domestic league appearances and goals as of 1 June 2024

Lancinet Sidibe (born 1 January 1997) is a Guinean footballer who plays for Albanian club Flamurtari.

== Honours ==
Tirana

- Albanian Superliga: 2019–20
