= Elton Calé =

Brazilian footballer (born 1988)

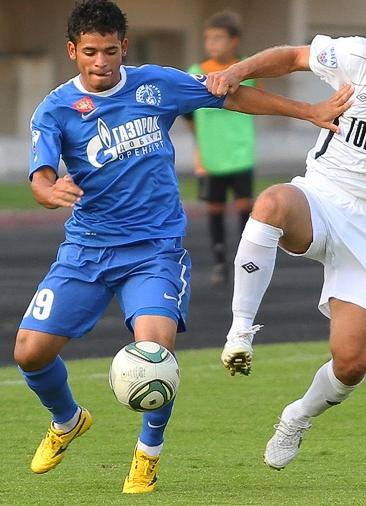
- Calé with Gazovik Orenburg in 2011

Personal information
- Full name: Elton Pereira Gomes
- Date of birth: 12 July 1988 (age 38)
- Place of birth: Barro Duro, Brazil
- Height: 1.68 m (5 ft 6 in)
- Position: Forward

Team information
- Current team: Gjilani
- Number: 11

Youth career
- 2005: Guarulhos
- 2006: Desportivo Brasil
- 2006: → São Bento (loan)

Senior career*
Years	Team	Apps	(Gls)
2007–2011	Desportivo Brasil	0	(0)
2007	→ Rio Claro (loan)	0	(0)
2007	→ Avaí (loan)	10	(1)
2008	→ Ituano (loan)	6	(0)
2008–2009	→ São Bento (loan)	0	(0)
2009–2010	→ Estoril Praia (loan)	32	(9)
2010–2011	→ Belenenses (loan)	27	(1)
2011–2012	Gazovik Orenburg	21	(2)
2012–2013	Leixões	21	(1)
2013–2014	Tondela	30	(4)
2014–2015	União Madeira	23	(4)
2015–2016	Ergotelis	22	(2)
2016	OFI	14	(4)
2016–2017	Ergotelis	9	(3)
2017–2018	Kukësi	44	(7)
2018–2019	Flamurtari	19	(0)
2019–2021	Tirana	46	(7)
2021–	Gjilani	70	(4)
- * Club domestic league appearances and goals as of 9 May 2024

Elton Pereira Gomes (born 12 July 1988), known as Elton Calé, is a Brazilian footballer who plays for Kosovan club Gjilani.

== Career ==
=== Early career ===
Calé began his football career with Guarulhos in 2005, before moving to Desportivo Brasil the next year. In 2006 Calé trained at Adelaide United, as Desportivo Brasil's partner Miami FC signed a partnership agreement with the Australian club. He then moved to Rio Claro for the 2007 Campeonato Paulista. In May, he was signed by Avaí until the end of 2007 Campeonato Brasileiro Série B. In January 2008 he left for Ituano until the end of 2008 Campeonato Paulista and extended his contract in June. After Ituano was eliminated from the 2008 Campeonato Brasileiro Série C, Calé was transferred to São Bento. In January 2009, his contract was extended until the end of the 2009 Campeonato Paulista Série A2. In April, he was released and played a few games for Desportivo Brasil at the Campeonato Paulista Segunda Divisão.

=== European career ===
In July 2009 he was loaned to Portuguese side Estoril Praia, thus making his first European move. Calé left for Belenenses in July 2010 in another loan.

Calé played the whole 2010–2011 season at Belenenses, making a total of 27 appearances for the club, and scoring one goal. He then signed a contract with Russian side Gazovik Orenburg, where he made 21 appearances and scored 2 goals in the 2011–2012 season. Calé then returned to Portugal, signing a contract with Leixões. He made a total of 21 appearances for the Matosinhos-based club, scoring one goal. In 2013, Calé moved on to fellow Portuguese club Tondela, where he played in 30 matches and scored 4 goals. In 2014, he signed a contract with fellow Segunda Liga contender União Madeira, and helped the club gain promotion to the Primeira Liga with 23 appearances and 4 goals.

On 23 January 2015, Calé left Portugal and moved to Greek Super League club Ergotelis. He managed to score his first goal for the club on his debut, in a 1–2 away victory vs. fellow Cretan club Platanias. The following season, Calé played with Ergotelis in the Football League, after the club was relegated at the end of the 2014–2015 season. However, as the club faced unbearable financial issues and failed to pay players' wages for months, Calé left Ergotelis in December 2015, and was practically considered to be out of the team. After Ergotelis officially withdrew from professional competitions in January 2016, Calé was released from his contract with the club and subsequently signed with local rival OFI, playing in the Gamma Ethniki, the third tier of the Greek football league system. He left OFI to rejoin Ergotelis in the Gamma Ethniki in August 2016. He terminated his contract with the club on mutual consent in January 2017 and joined Albanian Superliga club FK Kukësi.

=== Tirana ===
On 14 June 2019 Calé joined another Albanian Superliga club, Tirana, on a free transfer from Flamurtari. He made his competitive debut for the club on the opening day of the season in a 3–0 win against Luftëtari, starting the game on the left-wing and was replaced by Winful Cobbinah in the 56th minute. He registered his first assist later that month in an away game against Vllaznia on 31 August 2019, setting up Michael Ngoo in the 59th minute for the second goal of the game in a 2–0 win that took Tirana to the top of the table. On 19 October 2019 he scored his first goal for the club in a game where he also registered an assist, helping his side win 2–1 against Laçi to take his side to second in the table.

== Honours ==
Tirana

- Albanian Superliga: 2019–20
