= Hygor (footballer, born 1989) =

Brazilian footballer

Personal information
- Birth name: Hygor Guimarães Gonçalves
- Date of birth: 5 January 1989 (age 37)
- Place of birth: Rio de Janeiro, Brazil
- Height: 1.80 m (5 ft 11 in)
- Position: Midfielder

Senior career*
Years	Team	Apps	(Gls)
2007–2009	Sertanense		
2012	Coimbrões	2	(0)
2012–2013	União de Leiria	27	(2)
2013	Bangu		
2014	Botafogo	0	(0)
2014	→ Joinville (loan)	15	(0)
2015	Mogi Mirim	22	(0)
2016	São Bento	3	(0)
2016	Confiança	9	(0)
2017	Caldense	8	(0)
2017	Bangu	5	(1)
2018	Náutico	5	(0)
2018	Barra da Tijuca		
2018–2019	Akhaa Ahli Aley	20	(0)
2019–2020	Vllaznia Shkodër	21	(4)
2021	America-RJ	4	(0)
- * Club domestic league appearances and goals

Hygor Guimarães Gonçalves (born 5 January 1989), known as just Hygor, is a Brazilian former professional footballer who played as a midfielder.
