= Marsel Ismailgeci =

Albanian footballer

Personal information
- Full name: Marsel Ismailgeci
- Date of birth: 14 March 2000 (age 26)
- Place of birth: Tirana, Albania
- Height: 1.77 m (5 ft 10 in)
- Position: Left back

Team information
- Current team: Drita
- Number: 14

Youth career
- 2012–2019: Tirana

Senior career*
Years	Team	Apps	(Gls)
2017–2023	Tirana	105	(7)
2019–2022	→ Tirana B	4	(0)
2023–2024	Zrinjski Mostar	8	(0)
2023–2024	→ Ballkani (loan)	23	(0)
2024–2026	Ballkani	56	(3)
2026–	Drita	5	(0)

International career^{‡}
2018–2019	Albania U19	3	(0)
2019–2020	Albania U21	10	(0)
2020	Albania	3	(0)
- * Club domestic league appearances and goals as of 1 November 2026 ‡ National team caps and goals as of 11 November 2020

Marsel Ismailgeci (born 14 March 2000) is an Albanian professional footballer who plays as a left-back for Football Superleague of Kosovo club Drita.

== Club career ==
In July 2017, Ismailgeci signed his first professional contract with Tirana until June 2021.

Ismailgeci spent most of the 2019–20 Kategoria Superiore season on the bench, however he managed to appear in 21 matches, including 13 as starter, as Tirana won the championship title for the 25th time in their 100th anniversary. His only goal in the league came on 18 July in the 2–0 home win over Flamurtari. In 2019–20 Albanian Cup, where Tirana reached the final, Ismailgeci scored once in eight appearances; the goal, which was his first as a professional, came on 29 January against Kastrioti.

On 19 August 2020, Ismailgeci made his UEFA Champions League debut in Tirana's first qualifying round match against Dinamo Tbilisi; in the 86th minute, he scored from a rebound to make the score 2–0 and help Tirana progress to the next round, also achieving their first win in the competicion after 14 years.

== International career ==
Ismailgeci made his international debut for Albania on 11 November 2020 in a friendly match against Kosovo.

== Career statistics ==
=== Club ===
As of 19 August 2020

Appearances and goals by club, season and competition
Club	Season	League			Cup		Europe		Other		Total	
Club	Season	Division	Apps	Goals	Apps	Goals	Apps	Goals	Apps	Goals	Apps	Goals
Tirana B	2018–19	Kategoria e Dytë	2	0	—		—		—		2	0
Tirana B	2019–20	Kategoria e Dytë	2	0	—		—		—		2	0
Tirana B	Total		4	0	—		—		—		4	0
Tirana	2017–18	Kategoria e Parë	2	0	0	0	—		—		2	0
Tirana	2018–19	Kategoria Superiore	1	0	2	0	—		—		3	0
Tirana	2019–20	Kategoria Superiore	21	1	8	1	—		—		29	2
Tirana	2020–21	Kategoria Superiore	0	0	0	0	1 (Note: All appearance(s) in UEFA Champions League)	1	0	0	1	1
Tirana	Total		24	1	10	1	1	1	0	0	35	3
Career total			28	1	10	1	1	1	0	0	39	3

== Honours ==
=== Club ===
Tirana

- Kategoria Superiore: 2019–20, 2021–22
- Kategoria e Parë: 2017–18
- Albanian Supercup: 2022

Zrinjski Mostar

- Premier League of Bosnia and Herzegovina: 2022–23

Ballkani

- Football Superleague of Kosovo :2023–24
- Kosovar Cup :2023–24
