= Rustem Hoxha =

Albanian footballer (born 1991)

Personal information
- Date of birth: 4 July 1991 (age 35)
- Place of birth: Durrës, Albania
- Height: 1.87 m (6 ft 2 in)
- Position: Centre-back

Team information
- Current team: Dinamo City
- Number: 5

Youth career
- 2002–2010: Teuta

Senior career*
Years	Team	Apps	(Gls)
2010–2017	Teuta	135	(4)
2012–2013	→ Luftëtari (loan)	6	(1)
2017–2018	Kukësi	35	(2)
2018–2019	Luftëtari	24	(0)
2019–2021	Teuta	66	(4)
2021–2023	Ballkani	40	(2)
2023–	Dinamo City	49	(3)

International career
2009–2011	Albania U19	4	(1)
2011–2013	Albania U21	2	(0)
- * Club domestic league appearances and goals as of 1th June 2024

Rustem Hoxha (born 4 July 1991) is an Albanian professional footballer who plays as a centre-back for Albanian club Dinamo.

== Club career ==
=== Teuta Durrës ===
Hoxha made his league debut for the senior team on 14 May 2010 by playing full-90 minutes in a 3–1 home victory over Flamurtari Vlorë. His first score-sheet contributions came similarly to his time with Luftëtari Gjirokastër, netting the equalizer in the 44th minute of the 1–1 draw versus Tirana on 13 March 2014. On 2 June 2017, Hoxha left the club after nine years, where he collected more than 150 appearances in all competitions.

==== Loan to Luftëtari Gjirokastër ====
In January 2013, Hoxha was loaned out to Albanian Superliga club Luftëtari Gjirokastër. He made his first appearance for the team on 10 February in a 3–1 home loss to Kukësi. His first goal came on 2 March 2013 in the league match against Tirana, netting the temporary equalizer in an eventual 2–1 loss at Qemal Stafa Stadium.

=== Kukësi ===
On 19 June 2017, Hoxha agreed personal terms and joined fellow top flight side Kukësi. He was presented a day later where he signed the contract and was given squad number 5.

Hoxha played his first match with his new side on 9 September 2017 in the opening week of 2017–18 Albanian Superliga against Kamza, contributing in the 1–0 win. His maiden goal for the team came later on 19 February of the following year in the 3–1 away win over Partizani Tirana.

He left the club in mid-August 2018 after deciding to end his cooperation following the elimination of Kukësi from Europa League, finishing his spell with 42 appearances and 2 goals.

=== Luftëtari Gjirokastër ===
On 6 September 2018, Hoxha returned to Luftëtari Gjirokastër this time as a permanent transfer, signing for the 2018–19 season.

== International career ==
Hoxha is a former Albanian youth international and has represented his nation at under-17 and under-21 levels.

== Career statistics ==
As of 29 July 2021

Club	Season	League			Cup		Continental		Total	
Club	Season	Division	Apps	Goals	Apps	Goals	Apps	Goals	Apps	Goals
Teuta Durrës	2009–10	Albanian Superliga	2	0	0	0	—		2	0
Teuta Durrës	2010–11	Albanian Superliga	12	0	0	0	—		12	0
Teuta Durrës	2011–12	Albanian Superliga	8	0	2	0	—		10	0
Teuta Durrës	2012–13	Albanian Superliga	5	0	2	1	1 (Note: All appearance(s) in Europe)	0	8	1
Teuta Durrës	2013–14	Albanian Superliga	18	1	6	1	1	0	25	2
Teuta Durrës	2014–15	Albanian Superliga	29	0	2	0	—		31	0
Teuta Durrës	2015–16	Albanian Superliga	34	3	3	0	—		37	3
Teuta Durrës	2016–17	Albanian Superliga	27	0	5	0	2	0	34	0
Teuta Durrës	Total		135	4	20	3	4	0	159	7
Luftëtari Gjirokastër (loan)	2012–13	Albanian Superliga	6	1	0	0	—		6	1
Kukësi	2017–18	Albanian Superliga	35	2	7 (Note: Including one appearance in Albanian Supercup)	0	0	0	11	0
Kukësi	2018–19	Albanian Superliga	0	0	0	0	1	0	1	0
Kukësi	Total		35	2	7	0	1	0	43	2
Luftëtari Gjirokastër	2018–19	Albanian Superliga	24	0	6	1	—		30	1
Teuta Durrës	2019–20	Albanian Superliga	32	2	7	3	2	0	41	5
Teuta Durrës	2020–21	Albanian Superliga	34	2	4	0	2	0	39	2
Teuta Durrës	2021–22	Albanian Superliga	0	0	0	0	3	0	3	0
Teuta Durrës	Total		66	4	11	3	7	0	84	7
Ballkani	2021–22	Kosovar Superliga	0	0	0	0	—		0	0
Career total			266	12	44	7	12	0	322	19
