= Kristi Vangjeli =

Albanian footballer

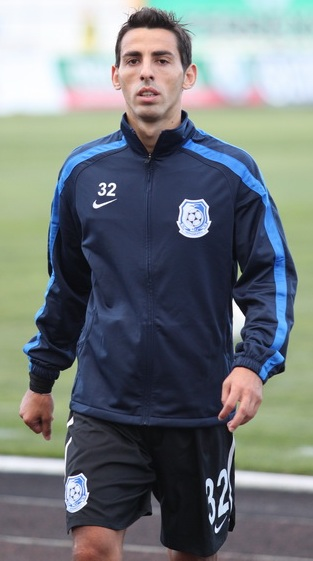

Personal information
- Date of birth: 5 September 1985 (age 41)
- Place of birth: Korçë, Albania
- Height: 1.77 m (5 ft 10 in)
- Position: Centre-back

Team information
- Current team: Adelaide Olympic (manager)

Youth career
- 1990–1995: Skënderbeu Korçë
- 1998–2001: Agios Georgios
- 2001–2004: Aris

Senior career*
| Years | Team | Apps | (Gls) |
| 2003–2011 | Aris | 106 | (0) |
| 2011–2013 | Chornomorets Odesa | 25 | (0) |
| 2013–2014 | Aris | 11 | (0) |
| 2014–2016 | Skënderbeu Korçë | 61 | (4) |
| 2016 | Astra Giurgiu | 5 | (0) |
| 2016–2019 | Skënderbeu Korçë | 97 | (2) |
| 2019 | Adelaide Olympic | 9 | (0) |
| 2019–2021 | Tirana | 53 | (1) |
| 2021 | Prishtina | 5 | (0) |
| Total | | 372 | (7) |

International career
| 2004–2005 | Albania U21 | 6 | (0) |
| 2007–2015 | Albania | 35 | (0) |

Managerial career
- 2022: Tirana (assistant)
- 2022: Tirana U-15
- 2024–: Adelaide Olympic
- * Club domestic league appearances and goals

Kristi Vangjeli (born 5 September 1985) is an Albanian professional football coach and a former centre-back. He is the manager of the Australian club Adelaide Olympic. His preferred position is right back, but he can also play on the left as he has done for both club and country on a number of times, as well as defensive midfielder.

== Club career ==
=== Early years ===
Vangjeli began playing football at the age of just 5 with local side Skënderbeu Korçë under the guidance of coach Benin Beta. As he lived near the Skënderbeu training ground, he would watch the first team players train which gave him the further ambition to succeed in the game. He stayed at Skënderbeu for 5 years until the age of 10, where he had been playing with his older brother Pavli (1984–2021).

In 1997 his parents sent his brother Pavli on a 2-month trial with PAOK, and when the club signed Pavli, his family then moved to Thessaloniki in Greece along with Kristi. As his brother was already at the club, his father did not want Kristi to try out for the PAOK team as well.

Kristi had to wait for his chance, which was given to him while he was playing football at his school, a coach from a small local team was watching the young Albanian playing from outside the gates. As Kristi did not know Greek well at the time, he did not understand him very well but he understood that he was a football coach and that he would like for Kristi to train with his team, Agios Georgios F.C. After his first training session he joined the club and played for them the very next day. After 2 years at the club, he was promoted to the first team and began to train with them at the age of just 15. As he was tall, fast and lively he was playing as a forward at the time, which was noted in a friendly game by the coach of the Aris second team. In that friendly Vangjeli scored 2 goals for the 5th tier side and was immediately offered a trial at Aris.

Without Agios Georgios knowing, Kristi went on trial at Aris at the end of the season, which was a successful one, leading to a 2,000,000 Drachma move to Aris. It was at Aris B that he changed his position from a forward, firstly as a defensive midfielder. At the age of 17 he was promoted to the Aris first team and in his first friendly for the senior team he was played at right fullback by Ole Skouboe due to injuries, in which he excelled and was offered his first professional contract just one month later.

=== Aris ===
Vangjeli is a defender who can play at either right back or left back. In 2003, Vangjeli signed for the Greek side Aris and since then made over 100 appearances.

=== Chornomorets ===
After eight years at Aris, Vangjeli made a €300,000 move to Chornomorets Odesa in the Ukrainian Premier League on 30 August 2011, signing a three-year contract. On the third round of 2013–14 UEFA Europa League, Vangjeli's Chornomorets faced his childhood club Skënderbeu Korçë. He left the club in January 2014.

=== Return to Aris ===
On 28 January 2014, Vangjeli signed a contract with Super League Greece club Aris.

=== Skënderbeu Korçë ===
On 30 June 2014, Vangjeli signed with Skënderbeu and returned to his hometown Korçë after 15 years absence. During his presentation he said that playing with Skënderbeu Korçë is a "dream come true". The contract that he signed with the club meant that he would play only in their Champions League campaign, and, if Skënderbeu were eliminated, he would return to Aris Thessaloniki.

He made his European debut with the club in the first leg of Champions League second qualifying round against Belarusian side BATE Borisov, playing full 90 minutes in a goalless draw at Borisov Arena. He also played in the return leg at Skënderbeu Stadium, with Skënderbeu who didn't earn more than a 1–1 draw, thus eliminated due to away goal rule.

After Skënderbeu's Champions League campaign ended, Vangjeli remained with Skënderbeu, signing a one-year contract to play for the White and Reds until the end of the 2014–15 season. In the 2014 Albanian Supercup match against Flamurtari Vlorë, he played in the entire match that ended with a 1–0 win at Qemal Stafa Stadium for Vangjeli's side, winning his first silverware of the season.

He made his Albanian Superliga debut in the opening match of the new season against the newcomers of Elbasani, helping the team to commenced the league season with a 1–0 win at neutral ground of Qemal Stafa Stadium, due to reconstruction of Elbasan Arena. On 17 October, he scored his first goal for the club in a 1–1 draw against Flamurtari in Flamurtari Stadium. That was his first ever goal in his 11-year career.

On 17 June 2016, he announced his departure from the club via an open later to the club fans, citing that he left the club for familiar and economic reasons.

=== Astra Giurgiu ===
On 17 June 2016, Vangjeli signed a contract with Romanian Liga I champions FC Astra Giurgiu. He made his league debut for the club on 23 July 2016 in a 4–1 home loss to FC Dinamo București. He was subbed off at halftime, being replaced by Alexandru Stan.

=== Return to Skënderbeu Korçë ===
On 30 August 2016, Vangjeli returned to Skënderbeu Korçë after Astra Giurgiu's financial problems, signing a one-year contract. During the 2016–17 season, he made 38 matches, including 33 in league, scoring once in cup, as Skënderbeu failed to win the league for the first time in six years and lost the Albanian Cup final against Tirana. On 19 June 2017, Vangjeli penned a contract extension, signing until June 2018.

=== Adelaide Olympic ===
On 5 June 2019, Vangjeli signed for Adelaide Olympic for the remainder of the 2019 NPL season.

== International career ==
=== Albania U21 ===
In the summer of 2004, just months before becoming part of Albania, Vangjeli turned down an invitation to become part of Greece under-23 team for 2004 Summer Olympics.

Vangjeli's first international call up came in September 2004 under Hasan Lika, following the players promotion to the Aris senior team. He made his debut for Albania U21s side against Greece in a 1–1 draw, which he played just two days before his 19th birthday.

=== Albania ===
Vangjeli has been playing for Albania since 2007 and has so far won 35 caps.

== Career statistics ==
=== Club ===
As of 27 May 2018

| Club | Season | League | | | Cup | | Continental | | Other | | Total | |
| Club | Season | Division | Apps | Goals | Apps | Goals | Apps | Goals | Apps | Goals | Apps | Goals |
|---|---|---|---|---|---|---|---|---|---|---|---|---|
| Aris | 2003–04 | Super League Greece | 6 | 0 | 1 | 0 | — | | — | | 7 | 0 |
| Aris | 2004–05 | Super League Greece | 9 | 0 | 4 | 0 | — | | — | | 13 | 0 |
| Aris | 2005–06 | Football League | 17 | 0 | 0 | 0 | 1 (Note: All appearance(s) in UEFA Cup) | 0 | — | | 18 | 0 |
| Aris | 2006–07 | Super League Greece | 18 | 0 | 1 | 0 | — | | — | | 19 | 0 |
| Aris | 2007–08 | Super League Greece | 17 | 0 | 2 | 0 | 3 | 0 | — | | 22 | 0 |
| Aris | 2008–09 | Super League Greece | 8 | 0 | 0 | 0 | 2 | 0 | — | | 10 | 0 |
| Aris | 2009–10 | Super League Greece | 11 | 0 | 1 | 0 | — | | — | | 12 | 0 |
| Aris | 2010–11 | Super League Greece | 19 | 0 | 1 | 0 | 8 (Note: All appearance(s) in UEFA Europa League) | 0 | — | | 28 | 0 |
| Aris | 2011–12 | Super League Greece | 1 | 0 | 0 | 0 | — | | — | | 1 | 0 |
| Aris | Total | | 106 | 0 | 10 | 0 | 14 | 0 | — | | 130 | 0 |
| Chornomorets | 2011–12 | Ukrainian Premier League | 15 | 0 | 1 | 0 | — | | — | | 16 | 0 |
| Chornomorets | 2012–13 | Ukrainian Premier League | 6 | 0 | 1 | 0 | 0 | 0 | — | | 7 | 0 |
| Chornomorets | 2013–14 | Ukrainian Premier League | 4 | 0 | 1 | 0 | 1 | 0 | 1 (Note: Appearance in Ukrainian Super Cup) | 0 | 38 | 3 |
| Chornomorets | Total | | 25 | 0 | 3 | 0 | 1 | 0 | 1 | 0 | 30 | 0 |
| Aris | 2013–14 | Super League Greece | 11 | 0 | 0 | 0 | — | | — | | 11 | 0 |
| Aris | Total | | 11 | 0 | 0 | 0 | — | | — | | 11 | 0 |
| Skënderbeu Korçë | 2014–15 | Albanian Superliga | 33 | 3 | 5 | 0 | 2 (Note: All appearance(s) in UEFA Champions League) | 0 | 1 (Note: Appearance in Albanian Supercup) | 0 | 41 | 3 |
| Skënderbeu Korçë | 2015–16 | Albanian Superliga | 28 | 1 | 3 | 0 | 11 (Note: Five appearances in UEFA Champions League, six in UEFA Europa League) | 0 | 1 | 0 | 42 | 1 |
| Skënderbeu Korçë | 2016–17 | Albanian Superliga | 33 | 0 | 5 | 1 | 0 | 0 | 0 | 0 | 38 | 1 |
| Skënderbeu Korçë | 2017–18 | Albanian Superliga | 31 | 1 | 4 | 0 | 14 (Note: Fourteen appearances in UEFA Europa League) | 1 | 0 | 0 | 42 | 1 |
| Skënderbeu Korçë | Total | | 125 | 5 | 17 | 1 | 27 | 1 | 2 | 0 | 171 | 7 |
| Astra Giurgiu | 2016–17 | Liga I | 5 | 0 | 1 | 0 | 2 | 0 | — | | 8 | 0 |
| Astra Giurgiu | Total | | 5 | 0 | 1 | 0 | 2 | 0 | — | | 8 | 0 |
| Career total | | | 272 | 5 | 31 | 1 | 44 | 1 | 3 | 0 | 350 | 7 |

=== International ===
As of 21 October 2014

Appearances and goals by national team and year
| National team | Year | Apps | Goals |
|---|---|---|---|
| Albania | 2007 | 7 | 0 |
| Albania | 2008 | 6 | 0 |
| Albania | 2009 | 6 | 0 |
| Albania | 2010 | 7 | 0 |
| Albania | 2011 | 8 | 0 |
| Albania | 2012 | 1 | 0 |
| Total | | 35 | 0 |

== Honours ==
Aris Thessaloniki

- Greek Cup runner-up: 2004–05, 2007–08, 2009–10

Chornomorets Odesa

- Ukrainian Cup: runner-up: 2012–13
- Ukrainian Super Cup runner-up: 2013

Skënderbeu Korçë

- Albanian Superliga : 2014–15, 2015–16, 2017–18
- Albanian Cup : 2017–18; runner-up 2016–17
- Albanian Supercup : 2014; runner-up 2015

Astra Giurgiu

- Romanian Supercup: 2016

Tirana

- Albanian Superliga: 2019–20
