= Agustín Torassa =

Argentine footballer

Personal information
- Full name: Agustín Gonzalo Torassa
- Date of birth: 20 October 1988 (age 38)
- Place of birth: Resistencia, Argentina
- Height: 1.65 m (5 ft 5 in)
- Position: Second striker

Team information
- Current team: Afragolese

Youth career
- 2003–2006: All Boys

Senior career*
Years	Team	Apps	(Gls)
2006–2014	All Boys	126	(10)
2007–2008	→ Red Bull Salzburg (loan)	0	(0)
2008–2009	→ Chacarita Juniors (loan)	10	(1)
2012–2013	→ Tigre (loan)	11	(0)
2014–2015	Huracán	14	(3)
2016–2017	Partizani	50	(3)
2017–2018	Mitre	4	(0)
2018–2019	Flamurtari	19	(2)
2019	Yanbian	0	(0)
2019–2021	Tirana	49	(7)
2021–2002	Gjilani	36	(0)
2023	Atenas	10	(0)
2023–	Afragolese		
- * Club domestic league appearances and goals as of 11 June 2023

Agustín Gonzalo Torassa (born 20 October 1988) is an Argentinian professional footballer who plays as a striker for Italian fifth-tier Eccellenza club Afragolese.

== Club career ==
Torassa started his career with Club Atlético All Boys in Argentina. He signed a 1-year loan deal with FC Red Bull Salzburg of the Österreichische Fußball-Bundesliga in Austria. He returned to Argentina, and signed a deal with Chacarita Juniors, after 6 months in Austria. On 27 January 2016 he signed with Partizani to play in the Kategoria Superiore.

On 31 July 2018, Torassa returned in Albania and joined Flamurtari on a one-year contract. He made 22 appearances and scored 2 goals in the 2018–19 season, including 19 in Kategoria Superiore.

On 14 June 2019, Tirana announced the signing of Torassa on a one-year contract, with an option of a further one. He was allocated squad number 15, making his debut on 24 August in the opening championship match, a 3–0 home win over Luftëtari. Torassa scored his first goal for Tirana on 27 October, the opening in another 3–0 win against the same side, this time at the opposition's turf. On 13 December, Torassa produced a Man of the Match performance against his former side Partizani, setting up his side's first goal for a 2–1 win at the newly built Arena Kombëtare.

== Honours ==
Tirana

- Kategoria Superiore: 2019–20
