= Jurgen Çelhaka =

Albanian footballer (born 2000)

Personal information
- Date of birth: 6 December 2000 (age 25)
- Place of birth: Tirana, Albania
- Height: 1.83 m (6 ft 0 in)
- Position: Midfielder

Team information
- Current team: Muğlaspor
- Number: 21

Youth career
- 2013–2019: Tirana

Senior career*
Years	Team	Apps	(Gls)
2018–2021	Tirana	49	(1)
2021–2025	Legia Warsaw	52	(0)
2021–2024	Legia Warsaw II	10	(0)
2025–2026	Olimpija Ljubljana	36	(0)
2026–	Muğlaspor	12	(0)

International career
2018	Albania U19	2	(0)
2020–2022	Albania U21	11	(0)
- * Club domestic league appearances and goals as of 7 November 2026

Jurgen Çelhaka (born 6 December 2000) is an Albanian professional footballer who plays as a midfielder for Turkish TFF 1. Lig club Muğlaspor.

== Club career ==
Born in Tirana, Çelhaka spent four seasons with local side KF Tirana before a move to Polish side Legia Warsaw in August 2021. Having failed to settle in his first months with the club, reportedly rejecting the club's instruction to play for the reserve team, he was given a run of games by manager Aleksandar Vuković in February and March 2022, and his form earned him plaudits from Vuković and Polish media.

Çelhaka moved to Olimpija Ljubljana in Slovenia in January 2025.

== Career statistics ==
As of match played 19 December 2024

Appearances and goals by club, season and competition
Club	Season	League			National cup (Note: Includes Albanian Cup, Polish Cup)		Continental		Other		Total	
Club	Season	Division	Apps	Goals	Apps	Goals	Apps	Goals	Apps	Goals	Apps	Goals
KF Tirana	2017–18	Kategoria e Parë	2	0	0	0	—		0	0	2	0
KF Tirana	2018–19	Kategoria Superiore	1	0	3	0	—		0	0	4	0
KF Tirana	2019–20	Kategoria Superiore	28	0	7	1	—		0	0	35	1
KF Tirana	2020–21	Kategoria Superiore	17	1	0	0	3 (Note: Two appearances in UEFA Champions League, one appearance in UEFA Europa League)	0	1 (Note: Appearance in Albanian Supercup)	0	21	1
KF Tirana	Total		48	1	10	1	3	0	1	0	62	2
Legia Warsaw	2021–22	Ekstraklasa	14	0	3	0	1 (Note: Appearance in UEFA Europa League)	0	0	0	2	0
Legia Warsaw	2022–23	Ekstraklasa	8	0	3	0	0	0	0	0	11	0
Legia Warsaw	2023–24	Ekstraklasa	19	0	2	0	7 (Note: Appearances in UEFA Conference League)	0	0	0	28	0
Legia Warsaw	2024–25	Ekstraklasa	11	0	1	0	9	0	—		21	0
Legia Warsaw	Total		52	0	9	0	17	0	0	0	78	0
Legia Warsaw II	2021–22	III liga, gr. I	1	0	0	0	—		—		1	0
Legia Warsaw II	2022–23	III liga, gr. I	8	0	1	0	—		—		9	0
Legia Warsaw II	2023–24	III liga, gr. I	1	0	0	0	—		—		1	0
Legia Warsaw II	Total		10	0	1	0	0	0	0	0	11	0
Career total			110	1	20	1	20	0	1	0	151	2

== Honours ==
Tirana

- Kategoria Superiore: 2019–20
- Kategoria e Parë: 2017–18

Legia Warsaw

- Polish Cup: 2022–23
