= Erion Hoxhallari =

Albanian footballer (born 1995)

Personal information
- Date of birth: 15 October 1995 (age 31)
- Place of birth: Korçë, Albania
- Height: 1.83 m (6 ft 0 in)
- Position: Left-back

Team information
- Current team: Dinamo City
- Number: 28

Youth career
- 2007–2013: Tirana
- 2011: → Grazer AK (loan)

Senior career*
| Years | Team | Apps | (Gls) |
| 2011–2022 | Tirana | 229 | (10) |
| 2014–2015 | → Teuta Durrës (loan) | 27 | (0) |
| 2018 | → Laçi (loan) | 0 | (0) |
| 2022–2023 | UTA Arad | 26 | (1) |
| 2023–2024 | Tirana | 32 | (1) |
| 2024–2026 | Polonia Warsaw | 51 | (0) |
| 2026– | Dinamo City | 0 | (0) |

International career
| 2009 | Albania U15 | 2 | (0) |
| 2011 | Albania U17 | 2 | (0) |
| 2013 | Albania U19 | 4 | (0) |
| 2013 | Albania U20 | 5 | (0) |
| 2014–2016 | Albania U21 | 12 | (0) |
| 2020–2022 | Albania | 4 | (0) |
- * Club domestic league appearances and goals as of 15:38, 29 May 2026 (UTC)

Erion Hoxhallari (born 15 October 1995) is an Albanian professional footballer who plays as a left-back for Kategoria Superiore club Dinamo City.

== Club career ==
=== Early career ===
Hoxhallari started his youth career at Tirana. On 1 July 2011 he was loaned out at Austrian side Grazer AK for a half season.

=== Tirana ===
Hoxhallari made his professional debut for Tirana on 23 November 2011 in the cup tie against Apolonia, playing full-90 minutes in a 3–0 home win. That was his first and only appearance of the 2011–12 season. Hoxhallari found more opportunities in the 2012–13 season, making his league debut on 13 April 2013 in a 2–1 deficit at Kukësi. In the 2013–14 season, Hoxhallari continued to get limited opportunities, as he made only nine league appearances, eight of them as starter.

==== Loan to Teuta ====
On 29 August 2014, Hoxhallari was transferred to Teuta on a long season loan from Tirana along with Ardit Peposhi. Initially Hoxhallari struggled to play as he did not leave the bench for the first four league matches. On 1 October, he made his debut by scoring the team's first goal of the 2–0 away win against Besëlidhja in the first leg of 2014–15 Albanian Cup first round. Four days later Hoxhallari made his league debut in a 1–0 away defeat to Kukësi, playing full-90 minutes. Following the debut, Hoxhallari established himself in the starting lineup, and went to play another 25 league matches until the end of the season as Teuta barely avoided the relegation to Kategoria e Parë.

==== 2015–16 season ====
On 1 June 2015, he returned in training with Tirana after the end of loan. He made his first appearance of the season on 29 August in team's second league match of the season against Laçi, where he entered in the pitch on the last 15 minutes as Tirana found the equalizer in the very last moments. With Shkëlqim Muça in charge, Hoxhallari was used mostly as a substitute, and during his tenure at the club, Hoxhallari played only one league match as a starter, the 2–0 home win against his previous side Teuta on 26 September. With the arrival of the new coach Ilir Daja, Hoxhallari become an undisputed starter and went to play as a started in every league game until the end of the season, as Tirana remained out of European competitions for the fourth straight season. He was praised for his performances on the back and on 31 May was named one of the talents of the year.

==== 2016–17 season ====
On 14 July 2016, Hoxhallari agreed a contract extension with the club, signing until June 2018. He scored his first league goal for Tirana on 6 November in the matchday 10 against his former side Teuta, contributing in a 3–1 home win. Later on 10 March 2017, he scored a free kick as Tirana denied Skënderbeu the win. During the course of 2016–17 season, he made 34 league appearances, scoring twice, and Tirana was relegated for the first time in history, finishing 9th. He also scored once in 7 cup appearances in team's successful campaign, which saw them win the trophy for the 16th time, setting a new record.

==== 2017–18 season ====
Hoxhallari kicked off 2017–18 season by playing in the 2017–18 UEFA Europa League first qualifying round against Maccabi Tel Aviv. He played in both legs, also making his European debut in the process, as Tirana was eliminated 5–0 on aggregate. Hoxhallari started the domestic season by playing in the 2017 Albanian Supercup against Kukësi on 6 September 2017, netting a 90th-minute winner via a shot outside the box as Tirana clinched their 11th Albanian Supercup trophy. Tirana also set a record by becoming the Albanian First Division side to win the Supercup.

Later on 13 December, in the second leg of 2017–18 Albanian Cup second round versus Vllaznia, Hoxhallari was sent-off with a direct red card following a brawl with Ardit Krymi who was sent off as well. Tirana lost 0–1 but progressed to quarter-finals after having won the first leg 2–0. Two days later, he was suspended for the next two games by AFA.

He concluded the season by making 21 league appearances as Tirana won the championship and gained promotion back to Kategoria Superiore.

==== 2018–19 season ====
On 6 June 2018, Hoxhallari signed a new two-year contract with the club.

Five days after signing the new contract with Tirana, Hoxhallari was sent on loan at Laçi for the two Europa League matches versus Anorthosis Famagusta. He took squad number 2, and made his debut in the first leg at Antonis Papadopoulos Stadium on 12 July, netting a first-half header to make it 1–0 for Laçi but in an eventual 1–2 defeat. In the second leg, Hoxhallari earned praise for his performance as Laçi won 1–0 thanks to a late winner to ensure the progression to next round through away goal rule. On 22 July, Laçi reached the agreement with Tirana to keep Hoxhallari for the next two Europa League matches. He featured in both matches versus Norway's Molde as Laçi was knocked out of the competition 5–0 on aggregate.

== International career ==
He has been a former Albania youth international, playing with under-15, U-17, U-19, U-20 and U-21 levels.

=== Albania U15 ===
Hoxhallari received his first international level call-up aged 14 by coach Sulejman Demollari of the Albania under-15 squad, which were just founded in 2009 for participating in the 2010 Summer Youth Olympics (Football).

He made his under-15 debut on 17 October by featuring full-90 minutes in the match against Liechtenstein which ended in a 2–0 win. Then the team advanced to the final where they faced Montenegro two days later, losing 1–2 as Hoxhallari played another full-90 minute match, missing their participation in the 2010 Summer Youth Olympics finals.

=== Albania U20 ===
Hoxhallari was called up at Albania national under-20 football team by coach Skënder Gega to participate in the 2013 Mediterranean Games football tournament which began on 19 June 2013 in Mersin, Turkey. Hoxhallari played in all 5 Albania U20s matches as full 90-minutes. Albania U20 was ranked in the last place out of 8 teams.

=== Albania U21 ===
Hoxhallari was called up for the first time in under-21 squad by the coach Skënder Gega for the qualifiers of the 2017 UEFA European Under-21 Championship, where Albania was placed in the Group 4. He made his competitive debut with the under-21 side on 28 March 2015 in team's first group match against Liechtenstein, playing in the second half in an eventual 2–0 away win. Hoxhallari was called up by a new appointed coach, Redi Jupi, for the next qualifying matches against Israel and Portugal on 3 and 8 September 2015. He played full-90 minutes in the 1–1 home draw against Israel, and was benched in the 1–6 home defeat against Portugal. On 28 March 2016, during the match against Hungary, Hoxhallari made a high-profile error which resulted in Hungary's only goal of the match, but Albania bounced back and scored twice inside of 10 minutes for a 2–1 home win.

=== Albania national team ===
Hoxhallari made his international debut for Albania on 11 November 2020 in a friendly match against Kosovo.

== Career statistics ==
=== Club ===
As of match played 10 May 2026

Appearances and goals by club, season and competition
| Club | Season | League | | | National cup (Note: Includes Albanian Cup, Cupa României, Polish Cup) | | Europe | | Other | | Total | |
| Club | Season | Division | Apps | Goals | Apps | Goals | Apps | Goals | Apps | Goals | Apps | Goals |
|---|---|---|---|---|---|---|---|---|---|---|---|---|
| Tirana | 2011–12 | Kategoria Superiore | 0 | 0 | 1 | 0 | — | | — | | 1 | 0 |
| Tirana | 2012–13 | Kategoria Superiore | 5 | 0 | 0 | 0 | — | | — | | 5 | 0 |
| Tirana | 2013–14 | Kategoria Superiore | 9 | 0 | 5 | 0 | — | | — | | 14 | 0 |
| Tirana | 2015–16 | Kategoria Superiore | 32 | 0 | 5 | 0 | — | | — | | 37 | 0 |
| Tirana | 2016–17 | Kategoria Superiore | 34 | 2 | 7 | 1 | — | | — | | 41 | 3 |
| Tirana | 2017–18 | Kategoria e Parë | 21 | 1 | 5 | 0 | 2 (Note: Appearances in UEFA Europa League) | 0 | 1 (Note: Appearance(s) in Albanian Supercup) | 1 | 29 | 2 |
| Tirana | 2018–19 | Kategoria Superiore | 32 | 0 | 8 | 1 | — | | — | | 40 | 1 |
| Tirana | 2019–20 | Kategoria Superiore | 30 | 1 | 5 | 1 | — | | — | | 35 | 2 |
| Tirana | 2020–21 | Kategoria Superiore | 33 | 5 | 1 | 0 | 2 (Note: One appearance in UEFA Champions League, one appearance in UEFA Europa League) | 0 | — | | 36 | 5 |
| Tirana | 2021–22 | Kategoria Superiore | 33 | 1 | 1 | 0 | — | | — | | 34 | 1 |
| Tirana | Total | | 229 | 10 | 38 | 3 | 4 | 0 | 1 | 1 | 272 | 14 |
| Teuta (loan) | 2014–15 | Kategoria Superiore | 27 | 0 | 3 | 1 | — | | — | | 30 | 1 |
| Laçi (loan) | 2018–19 | Kategoria Superiore | — | | — | | 4 | 1 | — | | 4 | 1 |
| UTA Arad | 2022–23 | Liga I | 26 | 1 | 6 | 1 | — | | 2 (Note: Appearances in Liga I promotion/relegation play-offs) | 0 | 34 | 2 |
| Tirana | 2023–24 | Kategoria Superiore | 32 | 1 | 5 | 1 | 4 (Note: Appearances in UEFA Europa Conference League) | 0 | — | | 41 | 2 |
| Polonia Warsaw | 2024–25 | I liga | 30 | 0 | 3 | 0 | — | | 1 (Note: Appearance in I liga promotion play-offs) | 0 | 34 | 0 |
| Polonia Warsaw | 2025–26 | I liga | 20 | 0 | 1 | 0 | — | | 0 | 0 | 21 | 0 |
| Polonia Warsaw | Total | | 50 | 0 | 4 | 0 | — | | 1 | 0 | 55 | 0 |
| Career total | | | 364 | 12 | 56 | 6 | 12 | 1 | 4 | 1 | 436 | 20 |

=== International ===
As of 13 June 2022

Appearances and goals by national team and year
| National team | Year | Apps | Goals |
|---|---|---|---|
| Albania | 2020 | 1 | 0 |
| Albania | 2021 | 2 | 0 |
| Albania | 2022 | 1 | 0 |
| Total | | 4 | 0 |

== Honours ==
Tirana

- Kategoria Superiore: 2019–20, 2021–22
- Kategoria e Parë: 2017–18
- Albanian Cup: 2011–12, 2016–17
- Albanian Supercup: 2012, 2017

Individual

- Kategoria Superiore Talent of the Season: 3rd in 2015–16
- Kategoria Superiore Team of the Season : 2020–21
