= Lorenco Vila =

Albanian footballer (born 1998)

Personal information
- Date of birth: 14 December 1998 (age 27)
- Place of birth: Durrës, Albania
- Height: 1.80 m (5 ft 11 in)
- Position: Centre-forward

Team information
- Current team: Dinamo City
- Number: 98

Youth career
- 2011–2017: Teuta Durrës

Senior career*
Years	Team	Apps	(Gls)
2017–2023	Teuta Durrës	153	(31)
2023–	Dinamo City	104	(13)

International career^{‡}
2019–2020	Albania U21	4	(0)
2022–	Albania	1	(0)
- * Club domestic league appearances and goals as of 25 June 2026 ‡ National team caps and goals as of 27 October 2022

Lorenco Vila (born 14 December 1998) is an Albanian professional footballer who plays as a centre-forward for Albanian club Dinamo City. His cousin is current Teuta and former Albania national team player Emiljano Vila.
