= Winful Cobbinah =

Ghanaian professional footballer

Personal information
- Full name: Winful Essau Cobbinah
- Date of birth: 6 September 1991 (age 35)
- Place of birth: Accra, Ghana
- Height: 1.80 m (5 ft 11 in)
- Position: Attacking midfielder

Youth career
- Starke Professionals

Senior career*
Years	Team	Apps	(Gls)
- BT Professionals
- Tudu Mighty Jets
2012–2014	Hearts of Oak	25	(1)
2014–2015	Najran SC	18	(3)
2017–2018	Hearts of Oak	25	(5)
2018–2020	Tirana	68	(10)
2020–2022	Cleopatra	31	(0)
2022–2024	Petrojet	0	(0)

International career^{‡}
	Ghana U17	12	(8)
	Ghana U20	26	(17)
2017	Ghana	3	(2)
- * Club domestic league appearances and goals as of 16:18, 19 July 2018 (UTC) ‡ National team caps and goals as of 16:18, 19 July 2018 (UTC)

Winful Essau Cobbinah (born 6 September 1991) is a Ghanaian professional footballer who plays as an attacking midfielder. 2024-2026 Waadi Degla

== Club career ==
Cobbinah began his career in his native Ghana, playing for Starke Professionals, BT Professionals and Tudu Mighty Jets, before signing for Ghana Premier League club Hearts of Oak in 2012.

In 2014, Cobbinah signed for Saudi Arabian club Najran. Cobbinah later terminated his contract at the club due to unpaid wages.

In 2017, Cobbinah returned to Hearts of Oak. Cobbinah made 25 league appearances, scoring five times in his second spell at the club.

On 13 July 2018, Cobbinah signed for Tirana.

In October 2020, it was revealed that Cobbinah was awarded Albanian citizenship by President Ilir Meta.

On Tuesday November 17, 2020, Newly promoted Egypt Premier League side Ceramica Cleopatra FC signed Ghanaian midfielder Winful Cobbinah on a free transfer after his contract with Albanian giants KF Tirana ended last month.

== International career ==
After representing Ghana U17 and Ghana U20, Cobbinah made his senior debut for Ghana on 25 May 2017 against Benin. On 16 September 2017, Cobbinah scored his first goal for Ghana, in a 1–0 win against Mali in the 2017 WAFU Cup of Nations.

=== International goals ===
Scores and results list Ghana's goal tally first.

#	Date	Venue	Opponent	Score	Result	Competition
1	16 September 2017	Cape Coast Sports Stadium, Cape Coast, Ghana	Mali	1–0	1–0	2017 WAFU Cup of Nations
2	24 September 2017	Cape Coast Sports Stadium, Cape Coast, Ghana	Nigeria	3–1	4–1	2017 WAFU Cup of Nations

== Honours ==
Tirana

- Albanian Superliga: 2019–20
