= 2017–18 KF Tirana season =

KF Tirana
2017–18 season
- President: Refik Halili
- Head coach: Zé Maria
- Stadium: Selman Stërmasi Stadium
- Kategoria e Parë: Winners
- Albanian Cup: Quarter-finals
- Albanian Supercup: Winners
- Europa League: First qualifying round
- Top goalscorer: League: Bedri Greca (14); All: Bedri Greca (15)
- Highest home attendance: 1,000 vs Vllaznia Shkodër (29 November 2017)
Home colours	Away colours	Third colours

The 2017–18 season was Klubi i Futbollit Tirana's 79th competitive season, first ever season in the Kategoria e Parë and 97th year in existence as a football club.

== Season overview ==
=== June ===
Tirana's relegation for the first time in history created a mass exodus at the club, with Afrim Taku, Gilman Lika, Olsi Teqja leaving the team immediately after they contract run out.

Later on 16 June, Tirana announced the signing of manager Zé Maria.

On 19 June Tirana acquired the services of Ugandan striker Yunus Sentamu after having originally signed an agreement in January 2016. One the same day, Brazilian midfielder Wellyson completed a transfer to Tirana by becoming the second purchase of transfer market.

Two days later, manager Zé Maria published the official list for the 2017–18 UEFA Europa League first qualifying round. The youngsters Realf Zhivanaj, Elvi Berisha and Rei Qilimi were promoted for the first time at senior squad.

Tirana lost the first leg against Maccabi Tel Aviv 2–0 at Netanya Stadium.

=== July ===
In the returning leg on 6 July, Tirana was defeated 3–0 at home and was eliminated from the competition 5–0 on aggregate. On 12 July, Moise Nkounkou terminated the contract with Tirana unilaterally which led the club to send the case to UEFA where they emerged victorious; the played was forced to give Tirana €100,000 compensation.

=== August ===
On 10 August, Merveille Ndockyt who had a breakthrough season in his first year at Tirana, was sold at La Liga club Getafe for €400,000. One day after that, second goalkeeper Edvan Bakaj terminated the contract with the club due to lack of playing time.

On 15 August, Elvi Berisha who debuted with senior team in the qualifying rounds of Europa League, was sold at Leganés B for €90,000.

On 24 August, defender David Domgjoni was transferred to Kosovan side Liria for an undisclosed fee. A day after, young defender Fjoralb Deliaj left the club as a free agent after being told by manager Zé Maria that he was not in his plans. On 28 August, Reuben Acquah was sold at LASK Linz for €250,000. On the same day, Uganda international player Tony Mawejje completed a transfer to Tirana by penning a contract until June 2019 with an option to renew. On 29 August, Alvaro Bishaj joined the club on a three-year contract at the request of manager Zé Maria.

=== September ===
On 2 September, Tirana signed English striker Michael Ngoo on a one-year contract with the possibility of a renewal for a second year. Two days later, Çelhaka joined the club on a deal running until June 2020. Çelhaka was presented alongside Bedri Greca who signed a two-year contract for an undisclosed fee.

Tirana played their first domestic match on 6 September in the 2017 Albanian Supercup. Tirana won 1–0 thanks to late winner of Erion Hoxhallari to clinch their 11th title in history. Tirana also set a record by becoming the first Kategoria e Parë side to win the Supercup.

On 7 September, after three months as free agent, Ifeanyi Edeh rejoined Tirana on a one-year contract. He however departed from the club on 24 September to pursue a career outside the continent.

Tirana begun their Albanian Cup campaign on 13 September by winning 2–1 away over Besa Kavajë in the first leg of first round. Karabeci scored both goals, including one with penalty. Three days later they played their first ever Kategoria e Parë match on 16 September by defeating Iliria Fushë-Krujë 1–0 at home. Tony Mawejje scored the lone goal.

On 22 September Tirana announced the purchase of midfielder Hardy Binguila on a three-year contract. He was presented at Selman Stërmasi Stadium and was given squad number 10. In the second matchday against Pogradeci, Tirana easily won 3–0 at Gjorgji Kyçyku Stadium. Sentamu and Ngoo were the authors of goals.

In the returning leg of Albanian Cup first round, Tirana won 2–0 thanks to Ngoo brace to progress to next round 4–1 on aggregate. On 29 September, after having initially assigned to reserve squad, goalkeeper Alessio Abibi was given clearance to join the first squad. He signed a three-year contract.

On 27 September was the draw for the second round of Albanian Cup. The team will play against Vllaznia Shkodër.

Tirana finished the month by winning another three league points, this time by beating Naftëtari Kuçovë 3–0 at home. Sentamu was on the score sheet twice while Karabeci scored the other goal.

=== October ===
Tirana begun October by winning 6–0 at Shkumbini Peqin. The goals were scored by six different players. It was also the fourth consecutive clean-sheet for Ilion Lika. The team continued their sublime form in league by winning 2–0 over Turbina Cërrik at home to extend the league gap. Nggo and Greca scored the goals for Tirana. The win was followed by another one in the next week as the team won 2–0 versus Tomori Berat with the goals of Karabeci and Sentamu.

=== November ===
In the first match of November, Tirana suffered a 0–1 home loss to Bylis Ballsh. Niko Zisi scored the lone goal of the match. For Tirana it was the first league defeat of the season and the first goal conceded after 540 minutes. Zé Maria called the defeat "a shame". Tirana bounced back fast, however, winning 2–0 versus Apolonia Fier on 18 November. Alked Çelhaka scored his first Tirana goal while Grent Halili for his first league goal for Tirana in his 33rd appearance.

Tirana dropped again points on matchday 9 on 25 November against Shënkolli. Karabeci scored for Tirana with penalty as the team finished the match with 10 players following the sent off of Çelhaka. On 29 November, goals from Greca and Wellyson secured a 2–0 home win over Vllaznia in the first leg of Albanian Cup second round.

=== December ===
Tirana's December began with a visit to the Redi Maloku Stadium to take on Iliria on 9 December. Tirana achieved an easy 3–0 win thanks to Daja, Turtulli and Karabeci goals. In the returning leg of Albanian Cup second round at Loro Boriçi Stadium versus Vllaznia Shkodër, Tirana was defeated 0–1 but progressed through thanks to the 2–0 win in the first leg. The team however played for one hour with one man less due to Erion Hoxhallari's sent-off following an brawl with Ardit Krymi. He was suspended for two matches by AFA. Following the end of the match the police violated the Tirana players which prompted the club to denounce. On the same day was announced that Tirana was going to play Kukësi in the quarter-finals of Albanian Cup.

Back in the league, the team scored 6 times in the match against Pogradeci to equal the best victory achieved in October versus Shkumbini Peqin. Sentamu scored a hat-trick which was followed by Qilimi, Halili and Ngoo goals. In the last match of 2017, Tirana recorded another big victory, winning 0–4 at Naftëtari Kuçovë, finishing Group B at first place. Karabeci, Ngoo, Sentamu and Bardhi scored the goals.

=== January ===
On 2 January, the club terminated by mutual consent the contract with Brazilian Wellyson who signed a three-year contract with Swedish outfit AFC Eskilstuna. The announcement was made three days later. On 9 January, young defender Marlind Nuriu was sent on loan for remainder of the season at fellow capital club Dinamo Tirana to gain more experience. On 12 January, the club announced their winter training camp schedule; the preparation phase is going to take place in Antalya, Turkey and the team would also play in three friendlies. Priror to that, Tirana released Ditmar Shehri, Mateus Levendi, Alvi Ahmetaj and several other players from the youth ranks. Flamur Bajrami was sent on loan at Vëllaznimi of Football Superleague of Kosovo for the remainder of the season.

The team played their first friendly on 18 January; the draw 1–1 against Kazakhstan Premier League outfit Tobol with Greca scoring Tirana's only goal. Tirana played their second friendly two days later; they draw 2–2 against SKA-Khabarovsk with Sentamu and Daja scoring for Tirana. Tirana finished their winter training camp by earning another draw, this time against Cherno More.

On 20 January 2018, the club announced their first two signings of winter transfer window; Kenneth Muguna joined the club on a 4 1/2-year contract while Mohammed Musa signed a 2 1/2-year contract. Five days later, midfielder Samson Iliasu was signed from Mohammedan Sporting Club and was sent on loan at Kastrioti Krujë on deadline day until the end of the season.

Tirana played their first competitive match of 2018 on 28 January; the team on 3–0 versus Shkumbini Peqin with the goals of Ngoo, Qilimi and Vrapi. Back in Albanian Cup three days later, Tirana despite dominating most of the game with one player less, was not able to win at home versus Kukësi as the match ended 1–1.

=== February ===
Tirana started February by earning a 2–1 comeback win at Nexhip Trungu Stadium versus Turbina Cërrik; Greca and Ngoo goals were enough 5th consecutive league win. In the next league match six days later, Tirana continued their winning run after beating 3–1 Tomori Berat at home; Ngoo scored a brace which was followed by Greca's goal.

Back in cup, in the second leg of Albanian Cup quarter-finals, Tirana lost 0–1 thanks to an early Kukësi goal scored by Sindrit Guri which sealed Tirana elimination from the competition 1–2 on aggregate. In the next league match against promotion contenders Bylis Ballsh, Tirana took the advantage by netting with Yunus Sentamu in the dying seconds of first half injury time. However, the hosts bounced back and scored with a controversial penalty with Maringlen Shoshi.

In the penultimate match of regular season, Tirana didn't go more than a goalless draw against Apolonia Fier.

=== March ===
On 3 March, in the final match of regular season, Tirana overwhelmed Shënkolli by winning 4–1, ending the regular phase as leaders with 45 points, four more than Bylis Ballsh. Tirana's lead was cut short in half due to new rules applied by Albanian Football Association for the 2017–18 season, meaning they were only two points ahead of Bylis.

The team played their first play-off match on 11 March against Pogradeci, winning 3–0 thanks to the strikes of Ngoo, Greca and Halili. This win was followed by the next one six days later against Tomori Berat. The team won 2–1 at home thanks to the goals of Sentamu and Ngoo. Goalie Ilion Lika was injured during the match after a collision with an opposition player and was taken off.

On 26 March, Michael Ngoo, who until now had scored 13 goals and provided 7 assists, suffered a major injury during the training session which ruled him out for the remainder of the season. Tirana played their third promotion play-off match on 28 March against Apolonia Fier; they won 5–1 thanks to the braces scored by Greca and Muçi and a goal from Karabeci, which helped Tirana to extend the league lead.

=== April ===
Tirana begun April by recording a 2–0 win against their closest rival Bylis Ballsh. The team scored in the 2nd with in-form Bedri Greca just seconds after Erando Karabeci missed a penalty. Greca scored the second goal in the 27th minute which gave Tirana the win. Tirana officially secured their promotion to top flight next season by winning 3–2 at home against Pogradeci. An owngoal from Hysenllari and goals from Grend Halili and Bedri Greca secured the win.

After clinching the spot for the next season's Albanian Superliga, Zé Maria decided to play in the next game against Tomori Berat with a young and inexperienced team, consisting players from the B squad. The team however managed a 2–2 draw. On 27 April, the youngster Ernest Muçi signed his first professional contract, a two-year deal until June 2020. In the last match of April, Tirana managed a narrow 1–0 win against Apolonia Fier thanks to the winner of Jurgen Vrapi in 31st minute.

=== May ===
On 8 May, Tirana were deducted three points due to financial obligations to its former player Gjergji Muzaka. In the final match of promotion Group B, Tirana defeated Bylis Ballsh 2–1 thanks to the brace of Bedri Greca to claim the trophy of Group B. The goals scored in this match made Greca the joint Tirana topscorer along with Yunus Sentamu.

On 16 May, in the Kategoria e Parë final against the Group A winners, Kastrioti Krujë, Tirana recorded a 2–0 win thanks to another brace for the man of the moment Bedri Greca to win the trophy of Kategoria e Parë for 2017–18 season.

== Players ==
=== Squad information ===
As of 1 February 2018

Squad no.	Name	Nationality	Position	Date of birth (age)
Goalkeepers
1	Ilion Lika	(Albania)	GK	17 May 1980 (aged 37)
12	Alessio Abibi	(Albania)	GK	4 December 1996 (aged 20)
Defenders
2	Musa Mohammed	(Nigeria)	CB	31 October 1996 (aged 20)
3	Klisman Cake	(Albania)	CB	2 May 1999 (aged 18)
4	Gentian Muça	(Albania)	CB / DM	13 May 1987 (aged 30)
5	Marvin Turtulli	(Albania)	CB	17 October 1994 (aged 22)
17	Albi Doka	(Albania)	RB	26 June 1997 (aged 20)
19	Alvaro Bishaj	(Albania)	CB	2 October 1991 (aged 25)
28	Erion Hoxhallari	(Albania)	CB	26 February 1993 (aged 24)
Midfielders
6	Tony Mawejje	(Uganda)	DM	15 December 1990 (aged 26)
7	Bedri Greca	(Albania)	CM	23 October 1990 (aged 26)
8	Rei Qilimi	(Albania)	AM	10 June 1996 (aged 21)
10	Kenneth Muguna	(Kenya)	CM	6 January 1996 (aged 21)
13	Erando Karabeci	(Albania)	CM / DM / AM	6 September 1988 (aged 28)
14	Asion Daja	(Albania)	CM / RB	14 March 1990 (aged 27)
18	Dorian Kërçiku	(Albania)	CM / RB / LB	30 July 1993 (aged 23)
77	Alked Çelhaka	(Albania)	CM	7 August 1994 (aged 22)
Forwards
9	Grend Halili	(Albania)	CF	24 May 1998 (aged 19)
11	Yunus Sentamu	(Uganda)	CF	13 August 1994 (aged 22)
45	Michael Ngoo	(England)	CF	23 October 1992 (aged 24)

==== From youth squad ====
Note: Flags indicate national team as defined under FIFA eligibility rules; some limited exceptions apply. Players may hold more than one non-FIFA nationality.

No.	Pos.	Nation	Player
15	FW	ALB	Patrik Bardhi
20	MF	ALB	Ernest Muçi

No.	Pos.	Nation	Player
22	MF	ALB	Jurgen Vrapi
—	MF	ALB	Serkan Basha

== Transfers ==
=== Transfers in ===
Date	Pos.	Nationality	Player	Age	Moving from	Fee	Ref
19 June 2017	FW	(Uganda)	Yunus Sentamu	22	Ilves	Free	
19 June 2017	MF	(Brazil)	Wellyson	23	Unattached	N/A	
21 June 2017	DF	(Albania)	Realf Zhivanaj	23	Promoted to first team	N/A	
21 June 2017	MF	(Albania)	Elvi Berisha	18	Promoted to first team	N/A	
21 June 2017	MF	(Albania)	Rei Qilimi	21	Promoted to first team	N/A	
28 August 2017	MF	(Uganda)	Tony Mawejje	26	Þróttur Reykjavík	Free	
29 August 2017	DF	(Albania)	Alvaro Bishaj	26	Sopoti Librazhd	Free	
2 September 2017	FW	(England)	Michael Ngoo	24	Oldham Athletic	Free	
4 September 2017	MF	(Albania)	Alked Çelhaka	23	Laçi	Free	
4 September 2017	MF	(Albania)	Bedri Greca	26	Kukësi	Free	
7 September 2017	FW	(Nigeria)	Ifeanyi Edeh	26	Unattached	Free	
22 September 2017	MF	(Republic of the Congo)	Hardy Binguila	21	AJ Auxerre II	Free	
20 January 2018	MF	(Republic of the Congo)	Kenneth Muguna	22	Gor Mahia	Free	
20 January 2018	DF	(Nigeria)	Mohammed Musa	21	Gor Mahia	Free	
25 January 2018	MF	(Nigeria)	Samson Iliasu	22	Mohammedan Sporting Club	Free	

=== Transfers out ===
Date	Pos.	Nationality	Player	Age	Moving to	Fee	Ref
2 June 2017	MF	(Albania)	Afrim Taku	27	Skënderbeu Korçë (Note: Following Taku's departure he joined Skënderbeu Korçë.)	Free	
2 June 2017	MF	(Albania)	Gilman Lika	30	Vllaznia Shkodër (Note: Following Lika's departure he joined Vllaznia Shkodër.)	Free	
2 June 2017	DF	(Albania)	Olsi Teqja	28	Shkëndija (Note: Following Teqja's departure he joined Shkëndija.)	Free	
12 July 2017	MF	(Republic of the Congo)	Moise Nkounkou	20	Free Agent	Free	
10 August 2017	MF	(Republic of the Congo)	Merveille Ndockyt	20	Getafe	€400,000	
11 August 2017	GK	(Albania)	Edvan Bakaj	20	Liria (Note: Following Bakaj's departure he joined Liria.)	Free	
15 August 2017	MF	(Albania)	Elvi Berisha	18	Leganés	€90,000	
24 August 2017	DF	(Albania)	David Domgjoni	20	Liria	Undisclosed fee	
25 August 2017	DF	(Albania)	Fjoralb Deliaj	20	Flamurtari Vlorë	Free	
28 August 2017	MF	(Ghana)	Reuben Acquah	20	LASK Linz	€250,000	
24 September 2017	FW	(Nigeria)	Ifeanyi Edeh	20	Free agent	Free	
2 January 2018	MF	(Brazil)	Wellyson	23	AFC Eskilstuna	Free	

=== Loans out ===
Start date	Position	Nationality	Name	To	End date	Ref.
9 January 2018	DF	(Albania)	Marlind Nuriu	Dinamo Tirana	30 June 2018	
18 January 2018	MD	(Kosovo)	Flamur Bajrami	Vëllaznimi	30 June 2018	
31 January 2018	MD	(Nigeria)	Samson Iliasu	Kastrioti Krujë	30 June 2018	

== Pre-season and friendlies ==
22 June 2017 Friendly	Tirana (Albania)	3–0	(Albania) Kukësi B	Tirana, Albania
14:00 CET	Merveille 3'; Doka 34'; Zhivanaj 52'	Report		Stadium: Selman Stërmasi Stadium

12 August 2017 Friendly	Tirana (Albania)	3–3	(Kosovo) Liria	Tirana, Albania
16:00 CET	Doka 21', 53'; Wellyson 90+1'	Report	Mustafa 66'; Korenica 77'; Magani 90'	Stadium: Selman Stërmasi Stadium

16 August 2017 Friendly	Tirana (Albania)	0–1	(Albania) Dinamo Tirana	Tirana, Albania
15:00 CET		Report	Çota 78'	Stadium: Selman Stërmasi Stadium

5 October 2017 Friendly	Tirana (Albania)	1–0	Albania U21	Tirana, Albania
15:00 CET	Karabeci 43'	Report		Stadium: Selman Stërmasi Stadium

18 January 2018 Friendly	Tobol (Kazakhstan)	1–1	(Albania) Tirana	Antalya, Turkey
18:00 CET	Zhangylyshbay 61'	Report	Greca 15'

20 January 2018 Friendly	SKA-Khabarovsk (Russia)	2–2	(Albania) Tirana	Antalya, Turkey
12:00 CET		Report	Sentamu 28'; Daja 40'

23 January 2018 Friendly	Tirana (Albania)	0–0	(Bulgaria) Cherno More	Antalya, Turkey
13:30 CET		Report

== Competitions ==
Competition	First match	Last match	Starting round	Final position	Record							
Competition	First match	Last match	Starting round	Final position	Pld	W	D	L	GF	GA	GD	Win %
Kategoria e Parë	16 September 2017	16 May 2018	Matchday 1	Winners	26	21	4	1	66	13	+53	80.77
Albanian Cup	13 September 2017	14 February 2018	First round	Quarter-finals	6	3	1	2	7	5	+2	50.00
Albanian Supercup	6 September 2017		Final	Winners	1	1	0	0	1	0	+1	100.00
Europa League	29 June 2017	6 July 2017	Third qualifying round	Third qualifying round	2	0	0	2	0	5	−5	0.00
Total					35	25	5	5	74	23	+51	71.43

Last updated: 16 May 2018
Source: Soccerway

=== Kategoria e Parë ===
==== League table ====
===== First phase =====
Pos	Team	Pld	W	D	L	GF	GA	GD	Pts	Qualification
1	Tirana	18	14	3	1	46	6	+40	45	Qualification to the Promotion round
2	Bylis	18	12	5	1	34	13	+21	41	Qualification to the Promotion round
3	Apolonia	18	9	4	5	31	19	+12	31	Qualification to the Promotion round
4	Pogradeci	18	8	3	7	23	24	−1	27	Qualification to the Promotion round
5	Tomori	18	8	2	8	23	20	+3	26	Qualification to the Promotion round

Source: Soccerway
Rules for classification: 1) points; 2) goal difference; 3) number of goals scored; 4) head-to-head points; 5) head-to-head goal difference; 6) draw. (Head-to-head record is applied for clubs with the same number of points only once all matches between said clubs have been played.)

===== Second phase =====
Pos	Team	Pld	W	D	L	GF	GA	GD	Pts	Promotion
1	Tirana (C, P)	8	7	1	0	66	13	+53	42	Promotion to the 2018–19 Kategoria Superiore
2	Bylis	8	2	2	4	43	24	+19	29	
3	Apolonia	8	2	2	4	38	30	+8	24	
4	Tomori	8	2	3	3	34	33	+1	22	
5	Pogradeci	8	2	2	4	33	39	−6	22	

Source: Soccerway
Rules for classification: 1) points; 2) goal difference; 3) number of goals scored; 4) head-to-head points; 5) head-to-head goal difference; 6) draw. (Head-to-head record is applied for clubs with the same number of points only once all matches between said clubs have been played.)
(C) Champions; (P) Promoted

==== Results summary ====
Overall								Home						Away					
Pld	W	D	L	GF	GA	GD	Pts	W	D	L	GF	GA	GD	W	D	L	GF	GA	GD
26	21	4	1	66	13	+53	67	12	0	1	36	8	+28	9	4	0	30	5	+25

Last updated: 12 May 2018.
Source: Competitive matches

==== Results by round ====
Round	1	2	3	4	5	6	7	8	9	10	11	12	13	14	15	16	17	18	19	20	21	22	23	24	25	26
Ground	H	A	H	A	H	A	H	H	A	A	H	A	H	A	H	A	A	H	A	H	H	A	H		A	A
Result	W	W	W	W	W	W	L	W	D	W	W	W	W	W	W	D	D	W	W	W	W	W	W		W	W
Position	4	2	1	1	1	1	1	1	1	1	1	1	1	1	1	1	1	1	1	1	1	1	1	1	1	1

Source: Competitive matches
A = Away; H = Home; W = Win; D = Draw; L = Loss

==== Matches ====
===== Regular =====
16 September 2017 1	Tirana	1–0	Iliria	Tirana
18:00 CET	Turtulli (yellow card) 61'; Sentamu (yellow card) 65'; Mawejje 79'	Report	Dule (yellow card) 31'; Bardhi (yellow card) 90+1'	Stadium: Selman Stërmasi Stadium; Referee: Olsid Ferataj

24 September 2017 2	Pogradeci	0–3	Tirana	Pogradec
15:00 CET	Lame (yellow card) 26' (yellow-red card) 73'	Report	Sentamu 29', 77'; Nggo 59'; Turtulli (yellow card) 75'; Wellsyon (yellow card) 83'	Stadium: Gjorgji Kyçyku Stadium; Referee: Edvin Hoxha

30 September 2017 3	Tirana	3–0	Naftëtari Kuçovë	Tirana
16:00 CET	Karabeci 13'; Sentamu 15', 90' (yellow card) 68'; Lika (yellow card) 27'	Report	Kajo (yellow card) 78'	Stadium: Selman Stërmasi Stadium; Referee: Indrit Myrtja

14 October 2017 4	Shkumbini Peqin	0–6	Tirana	Peqin
14:00 CET	Isaj (yellow card) 35'; Bërdufi (yellow card) 90'	Report	Doka 30'; Nggo 40' (yellow card) 61'; Hoxhallari 53'; Sentamu 56'; Daja 59'; Karabeci 90+1'	Stadium: Shkumbini Stadium; Referee: Blerim Ziri

21 October 2017 5	Tirana	2–0	Turbina Cërrik	Tirana
14:00 CET	Nggo 60'; Turtulli (yellow card) 65'; Greca 67'; Vrapi (yellow card) 75'	Report	Roshi (yellow card) 52'; Gërxho (yellow card) 60'	Stadium: Selman Stërmasi Stadium; Referee: Indrit Myrtja

28 October 2017 6	Tomori Berat	0–2	Tirana	Kuçovë
14:00 CET	Kopaçi (yellow card) 24'; Çaço (yellow card) 31'; Sharavolli (yellow card) 62'; Bitri (yellow card) 78'; Buba (yellow card) 80'	Report	Nggo (yellow card) 20'; Karabeci 32'; Daja (yellow card) 34'; Sentamu 42'	Stadium: Bashkim Sulejmani Stadium; Referee: Edvin Hoxha
Note: The match was held at Bashkim Sulejmani Stadium due to reconstruction of Tomori Stadium.

4 November 2017 7	Tirana	0–1	Bylis Ballsh	Tirana
14:00 CET	Kërçiku (yellow card) 50'; Bishaj (yellow card) 90+2'	Report	Vatnikaj (yellow card) 11'; Buzi (yellow card) 39'; Zisi 55' (yellow card) 56'; Kolgega (yellow card) 76'; Đorđević (yellow card) 90+5'	Stadium: Selman Stërmasi Stadium; Referee: Indrit Myrtja

18 November 2017 8	Tirana	2–0	Apolonia Fier	Tirana
14:00 CET	Halili 27'; Çelhaka 40'; Karabeci (yellow card) 70'	Report	Krasniqi (yellow card) 35'	Stadium: Selman Stërmasi Stadium; Referee: Fatjon Xhemalaj

25 November 2017 9	Shënkolli	1–1	Tirana	Lezhë
14:00 CET	Pjetrushi 17' (yellow card) 72'; Baku (yellow card) 28'; Luzi (yellow card) 29'	Report	Çelhaka (yellow card) 44' (yellow-red card) 63'; Karabeci 69' (pen.)	Stadium: Brian Filipi Stadium; Referee: Klajdi Kola

9 December 2017 10	Iliria	0–3	Tirana	Fushë-Krujë
13:00 CET	Doçi (yellow card) 41'; Peplekaj (yellow card) 45'; Boçi (yellow card) 83'	Report	Daja 25'; Turtulli 42'; Karabeci 45+1'; Wellyson (yellow card) 65'	Stadium: Redi Maloku Stadium; Referee: Olsi Sokoli

17 December 2017 11	Tirana	6–0	Pogradeci	Tirana
13:00 CET	Sentamu 23', 25', 49'; Qilimi 60'; Halili 72'; Ngoo 88' (pen.)	Report	Shyti (yellow card) 33'; Pura (yellow card) 58'	Stadium: Selman Stërmasi Stadium; Attendance: 0 Referee: Eldorjan Hamiti
Note: The match was played behind closed doors.

22 December 2017 12	Naftëtari Kuçovë	0–4	Tirana	Kuçovë
13:00 CET	Pepa (yellow card) 31'; Behari (yellow card) 76'	Report	Karabeci 32' (pen.); Nggo 38' (yellow card) 48'; Kërçiku (yellow card) 40'; Sentamu 45+1'; Bardhi 84'	Stadium: Bashkim Sulejmani Stadium; Referee: Edvin Hoxha

28 January 2018 13	Tirana	3–0	Shkumbini Peqin	Tirana
14:00 CET	Ngoo 44' (pen.); Qilimi 52'; Vrapi 81'	Report		Stadium: Selman Stërmasi Stadium; Referee: Laver Alla

3 February 2018 14	Turbina Cërrik	1–2	Tirana	Cërrik
14:00 CET	Roshi 8'; Bajrami (yellow card) 68'	Report	Greca 14'; Ngoo 66'	Stadium: Nexhip Trungu Stadium; Referee: Klodian Shahini

9 February 2018 15	Tirana	3–1	Tomori Berat	Tirana
14:00 CET	Ngoo 18' (pen.), 36'; Greca 57' (pen.); Mawejje (red card) 72'; Hoxhallari (yellow card) 88'	Report	Kopaçi 30' (red card) 45+1'; Bitri (yellow card) 50'; Kaloshi (yellow card) 57'; Çaço (yellow card) 89'	Stadium: Selman Stërmasi Stadium; Referee: Fatjon Xhemalaj

18 February 2018 16	Bylis Ballsh	1–1	Tirana	Ballsh
14:00 CET	Buzi (yellow card) 45+2'; Shoshi 85' (pen.)	Report	Sentamu 45+2' (yellow card) 80'	Stadium: Adush Muça Stadium; Referee: Enea Jorgji

24 February 2018 17	Apolonia Fier	0–0	Tirana	Fier
14:00 CET	Duda (yellow card) 36'; Dimo (yellow card) 62'; Kuçi (yellow card) 81'; Andoni (yellow card) 89'; Çako (yellow card) 90+5'	Report	Turtulli (yellow card) 52'; Ngoo (yellow card) 57'	Stadium: Loni Papuçiu Stadium; Referee: Laver Alla

3 March 2018 18	Tirana	4–1	Shënkolli	Tirana
14:00 CET	Bardhi 7'; Cake 19'; Kërçiku (yellow card) 58'; Luzi 63' (o.g.); Mohammed (yellow card) 67'	Report	Mirdita (yellow card) 53'; Liçaj (yellow card) 74'; Danaj 90'	Stadium: Selman Stërmasi Stadium; Referee: Olsi Sokoli

===== Promotion play-off =====
11 March 2018 19	Pogradeci	0–3	Tirana	Pogradec
14:00 CET	Çerepi (yellow card) 53'; Hidri (yellow card) 85'	Report	Ngoo 14'; Greca 51'; Halili 90+3'	Stadium: Gjorgji Kyçyku Stadium; Referee: Adrian Beqiri

17 March 2018 20	Tirana	2–1	Tomori Berat	Tirana
14:00 CET	Daja (yellow card) 39'; Sentamu 44' (yellow card) 84'	Report	Daci (yellow card) 37'; Hyseni 86'; Kopaçi (yellow card) 86'	Stadium: Selman Stërmasi Stadium; Referee: Edvaldo Durmishi

28 March 2018 21	Tirana	5–1	Apolonia Fier	Tirana
14:00 CET	Greca 6', 90+1'; Muçi 22', 48'; Karabeci 79'; Hoxhallari (yellow card) 83'	Report	Dimo (yellow card) 20' (goal) 89'; Andoni (yellow card) 49'	Stadium: Selman Stërmasi Stadium; Referee: Olsi Sokoli

7 April 2018 22	Bylis Ballsh	1–2	Tirana	Ballsh
14:00 CET	Bella (yellow card) 21'; Mahmuti (yellow card) 40'; Murataj (yellow card) 64'	Report	Greca 2', 27'; Kërçiku (yellow card) 42'; Vrapi (yellow card) 89'	Stadium: Adush Muça Stadium; Referee: Andi Koçi

14 April 2018 24	Tirana	3–2	Pogradeci	Tirana
14:00 CET	Turtulli (yellow card) 20'; Hysenllari 27' (o.g.); Halili 58'; Greca 81'; Cake (yellow card) 86'	Report	Mawejje 64' (o.g.); Çekiçi 83'	Stadium: Selman Stërmasi Stadium; Referee: Malcolm Spiteri (Malta)

22 April 2018 25	Tomori Berat	2–2	Tirana	Berat
16:00 CET	Kopaçi 24' (yellow card) 71'; Mersini (yellow card) 39'; Paja 55' (pen.); Gjonaj (yellow card) 61'; Myzyri (yellow card) 86'	Report	Bishaj 12'; Qilimi (yellow card) 40'; Cake (yellow card) 54'; Greca 84'	Stadium: Tomori Stadium; Referee: Xhulio Mema

28 April 2018 26	Apolonia Fier	0–1	Tirana	Fier
16:00 CET	Hysenshalaj (yellow card) 32'; Dimo (yellow card) 87'	Report	Bishaj (yellow card) 22'; Vrapi 31'; Cake (yellow card) 47'	Stadium: Loni Papuçiu Stadium; Referee: Hermal Llapra

12 May 2018 28	Tirana	2–1	Bylis Ballsh	Tirana
17:00 CET	Greca 30', 61'; Hoxhallari (yellow card) 50'; Turtulli (yellow card) 72'	Report	Mehmetaj (yellow card) 17'; Murataj (yellow card) 38' (goal) 45'; Kullira (yellow card) 56'; Mahmuti (yellow card) 68'; Bella (yellow card) 71'	Stadium: Selman Stërmasi Stadium; Referee: Erjon Bastari

==== Final ====
16 May 2018	Tirana	2–0	Kastrioti Krujë	Elbasan
17:00 CET	Greca 64', 73'	Report		Stadium: Elbasan Arena

=== Albanian Cup ===
==== First round ====
13 September 2017 First leg	Besa Kavajë	1–2	Tirana	Kavajë
16:00 CET	Perja 28'; Duka (yellow card) 30'; Cara (yellow card) 59'	Report	Karabeci 31' (pen.), 68'; Halili (yellow card) 37'; Turtulli (yellow card) 49'; Sentamu (yellow card) 81'	Stadium: Besa Stadium; Attendance: 650; Referee: Olsion Yzeiraj

27 September 2017 Second leg	Tirana	2–0 (4–1 agg.)	Besa Kavajë	Tirana
15:30 CET	Ngoo 9', 13'; Greca (yellow card) 75'	Report	Morina (yellow card) 31'; Bushi (yellow card) 78'	Stadium: Skënder Halili Complex; Attendance: 300; Referee: Hermal Llapra

==== Second round ====
29 November 2017 First leg	Tirana	2–0	Vllaznia Shkodër	Tirana
18:00 CET	Greca 67'; Mawejje (yellow card) 72'; Wellyson 83' (yellow card) 85'	Report		Stadium: Selman Stërmasi Stadium; Attendance: 1,000; Referee: Laver Alla

13 December 2017 Second leg	Vllaznia Shkodër	1–0 (1–2 agg.)	Tirana	Shkodër
13:00 CET	Vucaj (yellow card) 17'; Krymi (red card) 32'; Kalaja 60'	Report	Daja (yellow card) 6'; Hoxhallari (red card) 32'; Ngoo (yellow card) 79'; Karabeci (yellow card) 90+2'	Stadium: Loro Boriçi Stadium; Attendance: 500; Referee: Enea Jorgji

==== Quarter-finals ====
31 January 2018 First leg	Tirana	1–1	Kukësi	Tirana
17:00 CET	Turtulli (red card) 24'; Daja (yellow card) 24'; Ngoo (yellow card) 25'; Sentamu 40'; Cake (yellow card) 49'	Report	Ymeraj (yellow card) 30'; Dzaria (yellow card) 49'; Guri 88'	Stadium: Selman Stërmasi Stadium; Attendance: 400; Referee: Klajdi Kola

14 February 2018 Second leg	Kukësi	1–0 (2–1 agg.)	Tirana	Kukës
14:00 CET	Guri 5'; Žderić (yellow card) 39'	Report	Daja (yellow card) 17'; Ngoo (yellow card) 50'; Hoxhallari (yellow card) 82'	Stadium: Zeqir Ymeri Stadium; Attendance: 1,500; Referee: Juxhin Xhaja

=== Albanian Supercup ===
6 September 2017 Final	Kukësi	0–1	Tirana	Tirana
19:00 CET	Shameti (yellow card) 26' (yellow-red card) 29'; Bakaj (yellow card) 65'	Report	Çelhaka (yellow card) 26'; Hoxhallari (yellow card) 40' (goal) 90'; Kërçiku (yellow card) 58'; Turtulli (yellow card) 60' (yellow-red card) 90+2'	Stadium: Selman Stërmasi Stadium; Attendance: 700; Referee: Juxhin Xhaja

=== UEFA Europa League ===
==== First qualifying round ====
29 June 2017 First leg	Maccabi Tel Aviv (Israel)	2–0	(Albania) Tirana	Netanya, Israel
21:00	Cohen 27'; Dasa 64'	Report	Kërçiku (yellow card) 41'; Acquah (yellow card) 51'; Sentamu (yellow card) 74'	Stadium: Netanya Stadium; Attendance: 7,098; Referee: Tihomir Pejin (Croatia)
Note: Maccabi Tel Aviv played their home matches at Netanya Stadium, Netanya, instead of their regular stadium Bloomfield Stadium, Tel Aviv, due to renovation.

6 July 2017 Second leg	Tirana (Albania)	0–3 (0–5 agg.)	(Israel) Maccabi Tel Aviv	Tirana, Albania
17:00	Sentamu (red card) 44'; Doka (yellow card) 90'	Report	Davidzada (yellow card) 27'; Schoenfeld 49'; Itzhaki 80' (yellow card) 90'; Peretz (yellow card) 82'; Rikan 86'	Stadium: Selman Stërmasi Stadium; Attendance: 400; Referee: Sándor Andó-Szabó (Hungary)

== Statistics ==
=== Squad stats ===
	League	Europe	Cup	Supercup	Total Stats
Games played	27	2	6	1	36
Games won	22	0	3	1	26
Games drawn	4	0	1	0	5
Games lost	1	2	2	0	5
Goals scored	70	0	7	1	78
Goals conceded	13	5	5	0	23
Goal difference	55	–5	2	1	53
Clean sheets	16	0	2	1	19

Last updated: 16 May 2018
Source: Soccerway, UEFA

=== Top scorers ===
No.	Pos.	Nation	Name	Kategoria e Parë	Europa League	Albanian Cup	Albanian Supercup	Total
7	MF	(Albania)	Bedri Greca	14	0	1	0	15
11	FW	(Uganda)	Yunus Sentamu	12	0	1	0	13
45	FW	(England)	Michael Ngoo	11	0	2	0	13
13	MF	(Albania)	Erando Karabeci	7	0	2	0	9
9	FW	(Albania)	Grend Halili	4	0	0	0	4
8	MF	(Albania)	Rei Qilimi	2	0	0	0	2
20	MF	(Albania)	Ernest Muçi	3	0	0	0	3
14	MF	(Albania)	Asion Daja	2	0	0	0	2
15	FW	(Albania)	Patrik Bardhi	2	0	0	0	2
22	MF	(Albania)	Jurgen Vrapi	2	0	0	0	2
28	DF	(Albania)	Erion Hoxhallari	1	0	0	1	2
3	DF	(Albania)	Klisman Cake	1	0	0	0	1
5	DF	(Albania)	Marvin Turtulli	1	0	0	0	1
6	MF	(Uganda)	Tony Mawejje	1	0	0	0	1
17	DF	(Albania)	Albi Doka	1	0	0	0	1
19	DF	(Albania)	Alvaro Bishaj	1	0	0	0	1
21	MF	(Brazil)	Wellyson	0	0	1	0	1
77	MF	(Albania)	Alked Çelhaka	1	0	0	0	1
#	Own goals			2	0	0	0	2
TOTAL				70	0	7	1	78

Last updated: 16 May 2018

=== Clean sheets ===
The list is sorted by shirt number when total appearances are equal.

Rnk	No.	Player	Kategoria e Parë	Europa League	Albanian Cup	Albanian Supercup	Total
1	1	(Albania) Ilion Lika	14 (Note: Lika kept a clean-sheet for 72 minutes in the 2–1 win over Tomori Berat before he was replaced due to injury. The opposition scored later in the game with Lika no longer on field. His clean sheet is not included in overall statistics.)	0	2	1	17
2	81	(Albania) Alessio Abibi	4 (Note: Alessio Abibi kept a clean sheet on the same match as Ilion Lika. They both appeared in the 6–0 home win over Pogradeci on 17 December 2017. So both clean sheets are counted.)	0	0	0	4
3	97	(Albania) Ditmar Shehri	1 (Note: Ditmar Shehri kept a clean sheet on the same match as Ilion Lika. They both appeared in the 3–0 home win over Naftëtari Kuçovë on 30 September 2017. So both clean sheets are counted.)	0	0	0	1
TOTALS			16	0	2	1	19

Last updated: 16 May 2018
