= Ilion Lika =

Albanian footballer

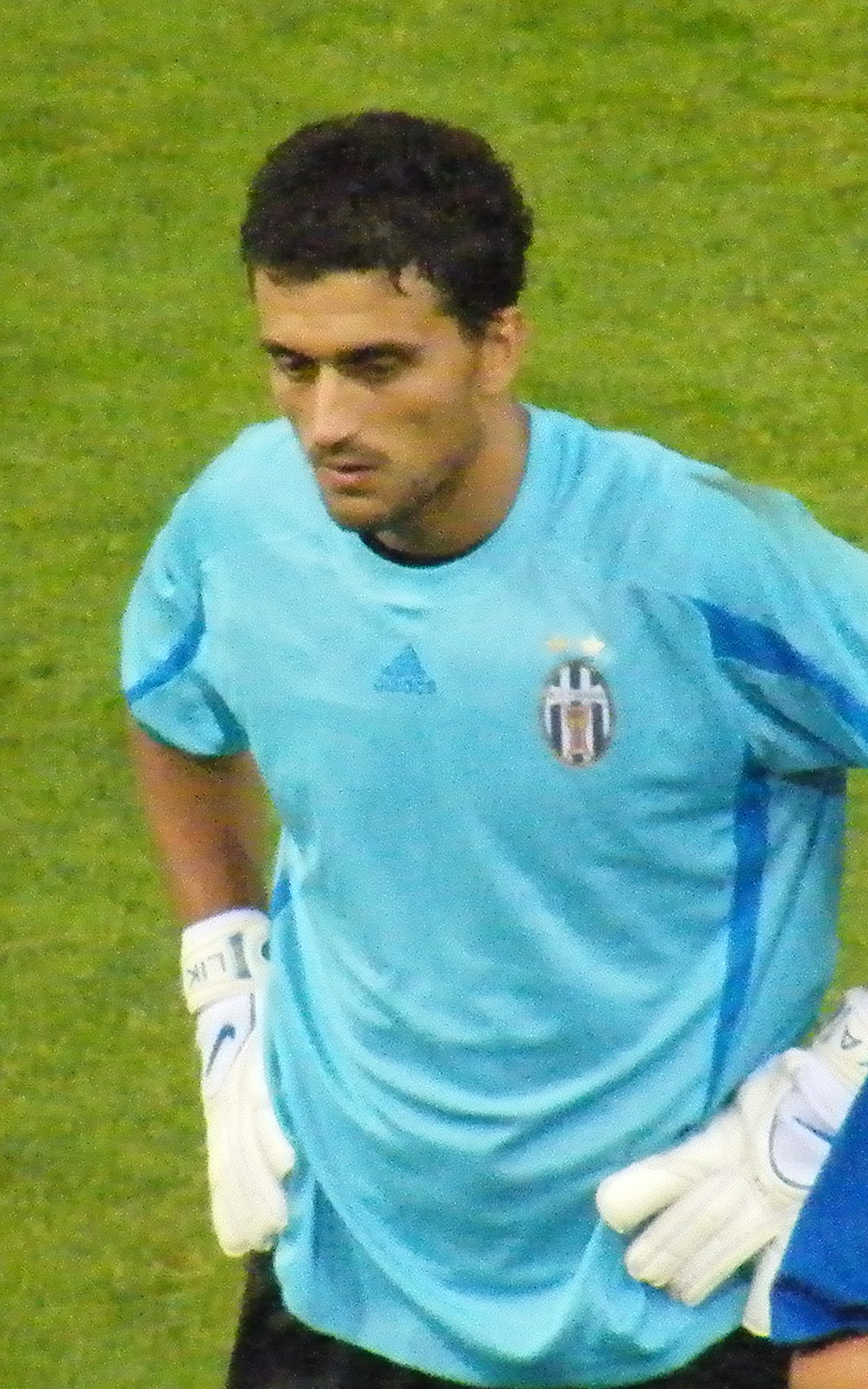

Personal information
- Date of birth: 17 May 1980 (age 46)
- Place of birth: Tirana, PSR Albania
- Height: 1.87 m (6 ft 2 in)
- Position: Goalkeeper

Youth career
- 1997–1999: Dinamo Tirana

Senior career*
Years	Team	Apps	(Gls)
1999–2007	Dinamo Tirana	199	(0)
2007–2008	Elbasani	17	(0)
2008–2009	Terek Grozny	27	(0)
2010	Vllaznia	1	(0)
2010	Kastrioti	15	(0)
2010–2013	Tirana	75	(0)
2013	Kastrioti	16	(0)
2014	Tirana	12	(0)
2014–2016	Flamurtari	38	(0)
2016–2024	Tirana	111	(0)
Total		511	(0)

International career
1995	Albania U16	2	(0)
1997	Albania U18	3	(0)
2000	Albania U21	1	(0)
2002–2006	Albania	14	(0)

Managerial career
- 2020–: Tirana (player-goalkeeping coach)
- * Club domestic league appearances and goals

Ilion Lika (born 17 May 1980) is an Albanian former professional footballer who played as a goalkeeper.

During his 25-year career span, Lika played more than 500 matches at the club level. He began his professional career in 1999 with Dinamo Tirana, recording more than 200 appearances in all competitions before leaving for Elbasani in 2007. Lika moved for the first time aboard in January 2008 by joining Terek Grozny of Russian Premier League. He returned in Albania in January 2010, representing in quick succession Vllaznia Shkodër and Kastrioti Krujë before joining Tirana in the summer of that year where he went on to play for the next three years.

In the following years, the now veteran goalie had spells again with Kastrioti Krujë and Tirana, before joining Flamurtari Vlorë in June 2014, where he played in the next two years. In 2016, he returned to Tirana, winning several other trophies before retiring later in 2024 at the age of 44.

He was also a member of the Albania national team between 2002 and 2010, earning 14 senior international caps.

== Club career ==
=== Early career ===
Lika played for Dinamo Tirana from 1999 to June 2007. He became a fan favourite during his time at Dinamo Tirana and was considered as being one of the best goalkeepers in the Albanian Superliga. Lika was tested by the Danish side Odense BK but he was not offered a contract at the club. His failed trial in Denmark paved the way for him to be transferred to the 2005–06 Albanian Superliga champions, Elbasani, in August 2007, where he signed a one-year contract. He played just under six months at Elbasani before looking for a new team. It emerged in January that Tirana were interested in signing the Albanian international and that Lika had spoken to one of the club's owners about a possible switch back to the capital, however Lika himself quickly squashed these rumours, insisting that he had never spoken to anyone about a move to Tirana and that it was all speculation. He also had offers from abroad as well with Vorskla Poltava apparently leading the chase for the goalkeeper's signature, although he had other clubs from Turkey and the rest of Europe interested in him. According to his agent, he was in contact with Vorskla Poltava, and he stated that Lika had been offered a very good contract, but it was still hard to accept because the location and the weather of Ukraine would have been a problem for Lika.

=== Terek Grozny ===
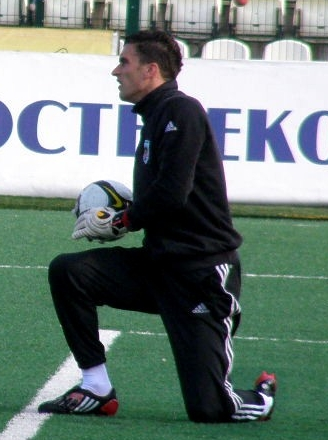
Ilion Lika warming up for FC Terek Grozny

Even though he had turned down a move to Ukraine, Lika was still wanted by Tom Tomsk and Terek Grozny, both in Russia. Both clubs had offered him a contract but Lika chose the one from the Grozny side as it was "too hard" to refuse. He completed his move to the club on 29 January 2008 and he signed a two-year contract worth $500,000. During his presentation, Lika stated that one of the main reasons for his move was that he hoped to one day become the Albania national team's first choice goalkeeper. Lika quickly became the club's first choice goalkeeper and put in many impressive performances throughout the 2008–09 season including one against CSKA Moscow where he impressed even the CSKA Moscow's coach with his performance, he also kept a clean sheet in the historic 1–0 victory over one of the biggest clubs in Russia.

He managed 9 clean sheets in 27 games during the 2008–09 season.

Following the first season in Russia, Lika has been offered to receive Chechenyan citizenship by the president of Chechnya, Ramzan Kadyrov. The president of Chechenya had expressed his desire for Lika to spend the rest of his career with Terek Grozny and had stated that he is a huge fan of the Albanian goalkeeper. He also gave Lika a brand new Land Rover worth $110,000 as a present during the 2008–09 season. In an interview with Ora News in Albania, Lika explained that if any of his teammates call him by his given name Ilion, then they will be fined by the club's owner and president of Chechenya, Kadyrov, who is one of Lika's biggest fans.

The president wanted the team and its supporters to call him Iljaz Lika instead of his official name, Ilion Lika. The chairman and Lika formed a special relationship and understanding of each other based on their Islamic beliefs because according to Lika the chairman is a very religious man and after realising that Lika is a Muslim as well he has treated him differently from the other players. Besides the Land Rover, he had also bought Lika a house in Chechenya. Lika and the chairman have also travelled to Dubai on holiday together, and they also went to Mecca, and that is how they have built a much closer relationship. He also says that he is treated like a king at the club and is a fan favourite already.

==== Injury ====
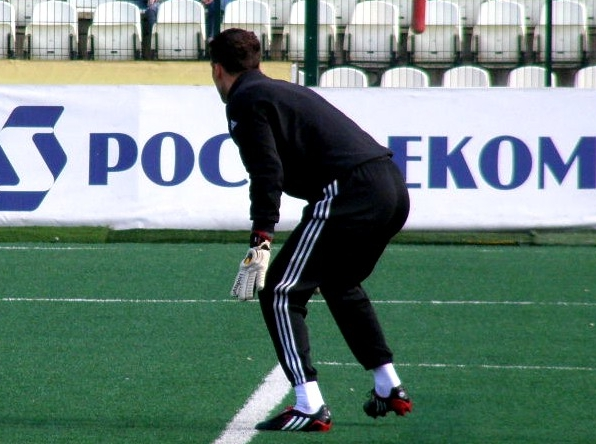
Ilion Lika warming up for FC Terek Grozny

Lika suffered an injury that would keep him out of action for over five months in February 2009. The vice-president of Terek Grozny announced that Lika would miss at least five months of football after damaging his Achilles tendon. The injury meant that he missed the start of the Russian Premier League and also three crucial 2010 World Cup qualifiers and with first choice goalkeeper Arjan Beqaj already out for a lengthy period, this would have meant that Lika would have been the first choice keeper and would have been back in the squad after spending more than 2 years out of the national squad. Terek Grozny quickly brought in a goalkeeper to take the injured Lika's place; that goalkeeper was Andriy Dikan and he was the club's main goalkeeper for the start of the 2009–10 season. Lika spent five weeks rehabilitating in Macedonia in 2009 to try to get him back to full fitness.

==== Departure ====
On 1 December 2009, Lika left the club officially along with six other players. All five others were foreign: the Slovak defender Radoslav Zabavník, Brazilian defender Cléber Guedes de Lima and Romanians Florentin Petre, Andrei Margaritescu and Daniel Pancu; the players left for free after the club decided not to renew their contracts.

=== Vllaznia Shkodër ===
Lika returned to Albania in January 2010 now as a free agent, agreeing to a short-term contract with Albanian Superliga strugglers Vllaznia Shkodër. He was placed only the team's third choice keeper behind veteran Armir Grimaj and youngster Olti Bishani, making his debut for the club on 23 January in the 2–1 loss at Shkumbini Peqin. Five days later, Lika was released from his contract by the club president Valter Fushaj, with the goalkeeper being unhappy with his contract and clauses, thus becoming a free agent again.

=== Kastrioti Krujë ===
One the same after his departure from Vllaznia Shkodër, Lika signed to fellow top-flight side Kastrioti Krujë on a contract until the end of 2009–10 season. He played his first game for the club the next day by keeping a clean sheet in the 1–0 win over Gramozi Ersekë. He concluded the second half of the season by making 16 league appearances, 15 of them with Kastrioti. He became a free agent after his contract ran out.

=== Tirana ===
On 17 June 2010, Lika was presented as Tirana's newest player by signing a contract for the upcoming season. He played with the club in the UEFA Europa League qualifying rounds, collecting three appearances; he kept two clean-sheets in the first qualifying round tie versus Hungary's Zalaegerszegi TE as Tirana won 1–0 on aggregate thanks to a golden goal scored by Erando Karabeci in the 107th minute of the second leg at ZTE Arena. Lika was also on goal in the 4–0 away defeat to Utrecht in the first leg of second qualifying round. He was accused by coach and club directors as one of the players to influence the defeat, and was not in the squad for the returning leg at Qemal Stafa Stadium which finished in a 1–1 draw. Lika however denied the accusations by stating that he has always "defended the Tirana jersey with heart."

=== Return to Kastrioti Krujë ===
On 14 August 2013, Lika joined Kastrioti Krujë by penning a contract until the end of 2013–14 season. He played 16 league games in the first part of the season before leaving in January of the following year.

=== Return to Tirana ===
On 5 January 2014, Lika agreed terms with Tirana to join the Albanian Superliga strugglers for the second part of 2013–14 season. He signed an initial six-month contract with the option of a further one year. He made his return debut on 1 February by keeping his goal intact in the goalless draw versus his former employers Kastrioti Krujë. Six days later, Lika kept his second consecutive clean-sheet with a fine display in the capital derby versus Partizani, meaning that Tirana has won for the first time in nine matches. He played 12 matches in his second spell at Tirana, collecting 1080 minutes and 4 clean-sheets as Tirana avoided relegation by earning a 2–2 draw versus Flamutari Vlorë on 4 May. Following the end of the season, Lika was presented with Albanian Superliga Fair Play Award. He left the club in June 2014 after the club did not pay him an old debt which Lika won at Conflict Resolution Room at FSHF.

=== Flamurtari Vlorë ===
On 5 June 2014, shortly after the end of the season, Lika left Tirana and joined Flamurtari Vlorë by penning a two-year contract. He was projected as starter in the team's European campaign, playing his first match in the first leg of 2014–15 UEFA Europa League first qualifying round against Sioni Bolnisi, playing full-90 minutes as Flamurtari to win 3–2 away. In the returning leg, despite losing 2–1, Flamurtari went through on away goal rule.

Lika remained on goal for the next two matches of the second qualifying round as the team was knocked out 5–1 on aggregate by Petrolul Ploiești, ending thus his European campaign with four matches.

=== Second return at Tirana ===
In June 2016, Lika completed a transfer to Tirana by penning a contract for the 2016–17 season, marking thus his second return. He took his old squad number 1, and commenced the season on 7 September by keeping a clean sheet in the opening league match versus Teuta Durrës, which ended in a goalless draw. Lika enjoyed a strong run in the first games of the season, keeping five clean-sheets in the opening six league matches, as Tirana become a title contender. However, the team declined and did not win a league match in six months, starting the negative streak in the goalless draw against Vllaznia Shkodër on 22 December and finishing on 10 May of the following year by winning 2–0 versus Korabi Peshkopi, eventually becoming a potential contender for relegation. In the final matchday of the season against fellow relegation strugglers Vllaznia Shkodër, Tirana did not earn more than a goalless draw, meaning that they have been relegated for the first time in history. Lika was ever-present in league, playing every minute from 36 appearances, keeping 17 clean-sheets in the process. In the Albanian Cup final on 31 May, Lika was on goal as Tirana defeated 3–1 Skënderbeu Korçë at Elbasan Arena to win the title for a record 16th time.

The cup success meant the return of Tirana in European competitions after five years, with Lika being included in the new coach Zé Maria's list for the 2017–18 UEFA Europa League first qualifying round. He played in both matches as Tirana was easily eliminated by Israeli's Maccabi Tel Aviv 5–0 on aggregate. Following the end of the European campaign, Lika was one of the players to show loyalty to the club, agreeing a new one-year contract extension in club's first ever Albanian First Division season. He began the domestic season on 7 September by winning the Albanian Supercup, this third overall, as Tirana scored a late goal for a 1–0 win over Superliga champions Kukësi. He made his first ever Albanian First Division appearance on 16 September by keeping a clean sheet in the 1–0 home win over Iliria Fushë-Krujë. Lika did not concede in the first five matches, and was beaten for the first time on 4 November when Bylis Ballsh's Niko Zisi scored the lone goal for Tirana's first loss in First Division.

Tirana went to dominate with hammering results in either home or away matches, such as the 6–0 win at Shkumbini Peqin were Lika also saved a penalty kick, or another 6–0 win, this time at home versus Pogradeci. Lika was injured on 17 March 2018 during the 2–1 home win versus Tomori Berat after a collision with an opposition player; he was taken off with a stretcher afterwards, returning in action only on 12 May in the final promotion play-off match against Bylis Ballsh, with Tirana already promoted. Four days later, in the First Division final against the Group A winners Kastrioti Krujë, Lika kept a clean-sheet and helped Tirana to a 2–0 win to seal the trophy of Albanian First Division for 2017–18 season. He finished the 2017–18 season by making 29 appearances in all competitions, including 20 in league, keeping 17 clean-sheets, 14 of them in league.

Lika commenced the 2018–19 season initially as a starter, but in November 2018, he submitted his starting post to younger keeper Alessio Abibi. However, in May 2019, Lika returned as starter once again and helped Tirana escape relegation by keeping two clean-sheets in the last three matches. In the match against Laçi on 26 May, he made a decisive penalty save to deny the hosts the equalizing goal, in an eventual 3–1 win. Lika concluded the season by making 14 appearances between league and cup. On 10 July 2019, he signed a new one-year contract, extending his stay with the capital side until 2020.

On 24 July 2024, Lika announced his retirement from football, bringing an end to his 25-year senior career.

== International career ==
Lika was first approached to Albania senior team in January 2002 for the Bahrain Shoot Soccer Tournament, held at Riffa. He earned his first international cap on 10 January in the third match against the hosts, conceding three times as Albania lost 3–0; they finished in the third place tied on points with Macedonia but with better goal average.

Lika was the starting goalkeeper in the 2006 FIFA World Cup qualification campaign. He played seven matches in the Group 2, keeping no clean-sheets as Albania finished in 5th position.

Lika continued to be part of the team in UEFA Euro 2008 qualifiers, where Albania was placed in Group G. He was called up for the opening two matches against Belarus and Romania in September 2006, starting in the opening match which ended in a 2–2 draw. Otto Barić then removed Lika from the team in March 2007 due to problems with his club Dinamo Tirana, as he was forced to become a free agent until the end of the season. Arjan Beqaj was used as the starting keeper with Isli Hidi as his backup. He returned to the national team in October 2007 after half a year absence for the match versus Slovenia due to an injury of Beqaj. Speaking about that, Lika stated return to the national team was an "indescribable joy".

Under new manager Arie Haan, Lika received another call-up in January 2008 for gathering between 14 and 23 January in Antalya, Turkey. He was the third goalkeeper in Albania's unsuccessful 2010 FIFA World Cup qualification campaign.

Lika returned to the national team in February 2010, where he was named in the squad for the unofficial friendly versus Kosovo. He played as a substitute in the match which ended in a 3–2 win for Lika's side. It was his final call-up to the national team, as he was no longer part in the UEFA Euro 2012 qualifying campaign, with his spot occupied by youngster Samir Ujkani.

== Personal life ==
Lika is a practicing Muslim. He has also spoken out strongly against homosexuality, calling it "dangerous", as it violates the family.

== Career statistics ==
=== Club ===
Appearances and goals by club, season and competition
Club	Season	League			Cup		Europe		Other		Total	
Club	Season	Division	Apps	Goals	Apps	Goals	Apps	Goals	Apps	Goals	Apps	Goals
Dinamo Tirana	1999–2000	Kategoria Superiore	6	0	0	0	—		—		6	0
Dinamo Tirana	2000–01	Kategoria Superiore	16	0	0	0	—		—		16	0
Dinamo Tirana	2001–02	Kategoria Superiore	25	0	0	0	2 (Note: Appearance(s) in UEFA Cup)	0	—		27	0
Dinamo Tirana	2002–03	Kategoria Superiore	25	0	0	0	4 (Note: Appearance(s) in UEFA Champions League)	0	—		29	0
Dinamo Tirana	2003–04	Kategoria Superiore	35	0	0	0	4	0	1 (Note: Appearance in Albanian Supercup)	0	40	0
Dinamo Tirana	2004–05	Kategoria Superiore	35	0	0	0	2	0	—		37	0
Dinamo Tirana	2005–06	Kategoria Superiore	36	0	0	0	1 (Note: Appearance(s) in UEFA Intertoto Cup)	0	—		37	0
Dinamo Tirana	2006–07	Kategoria Superiore	21	0	0	0	2	0	—		23	0
Dinamo Tirana	Total		199	0	0	0	15	0	1	0	215	0
Elbasani	2007–08	Kategoria Superiore	17	0	0	0	—		—		17	0
Terek Grozny	2008	Russian Premier League	27	0	1	0	—		—		28	0
Terek Grozny	2009	Russian Premier League	0	0	0	0	—		—		0	0
Terek Grozny	Total		27	0	1	0	—		—		28	0
Vllaznia Shkodër	2009–10	Kategoria Superiore	1	0	—		—		—		1	0
Kastrioti Krujë	2009–10	Kategoria Superiore	15	0	1	0	—		—		16	0
Tirana	2010–11	Kategoria Superiore	30	0	5	0	3 (Note: Appearance(s) in UEFA Europa League)	0	—		38	0
Tirana	2011–12	Kategoria Superiore	26	0	15	0	2	0	1	0	44	0
Tirana	2012–13	Kategoria Superiore	19	0	4	0	4	0	1	0	28	0
Tirana	Total		75	0	24	0	9	0	2	0	110	0
Kastrioti Krujë	2013–14	Kategoria Superiore	16	0	0	0	—		—		16	0
Tirana	2013–14	Kategoria Superiore	12	0	—		—		—		12	0
Flamurtari Vlorë	2014–15	Kategoria Superiore	24	0	1	0	4	0	1	0	30	0
Flamurtari Vlorë	2015–16	Kategoria Superiore	14	0	2	0	—		—		16	0
Flamurtari Vlorë	Total		38	0	3	0	4	0	1	0	46	0
Tirana	2016–17	Kategoria Superiore	36	0	1	0	—		—		37	0
Tirana	2017–18	Kategoria e Parë	20	0	6	0	2	0	1	0	29	0
Tirana	2018–19	Kategoria Superiore	12	0	2	0	—		—		14	0
Tirana	2019–20	Kategoria Superiore	31	0	4	0	2	0	—		27	0
Tirana	2020–21	Kategoria Superiore	1	0	1	0	—		1	0	3	0
Tirana	2021–22	Kategoria Superiore	3	0	1	0	—		—		4	0
Tirana	2022–23	Kategoria Superiore	2	0	5	0	0	0	0	0	7	0
Tirana	2023–24	Kategoria Superiore	6	0	0	0	1 (Note: Appearance(s) in UEFA Europa Conference League)	0	—		7	0
Tirana	Total		111	0	20	0	5	0	2	0	138	0
Career total			511	0	49	0	33	0	6	0	599	0

=== International ===
Appearances and goals by national team and year
National team	Year	Apps	Goals
Albania	2002	1	0
Albania	2003	0	0
Albania	2004	3	0
Albania	2005	7	0
Albania	2006	3	0
Total		14	0

== Honours ==
Dinamo Tirana

- Albanian Superliga: 2001–02
- Albanian Cup: 2002–03

Tirana

- Albanian Superliga: 2019–20, 2021–22; runner-up 2022–23
- Albanian Cup: 2010–11, 2011–12, 2016–17; runner-up 2018–19, 2019–20, 2023
- Albanian Supercup: 2011, 2012, 2017, 2022; runner-up 2021
- Albanian First Division: 2017–18

Individual

- Albanian Superliga Player of the Month: April 2014
- Albanian Superliga Fair Play Award: 2013–14
