= Klisman Cake =

Albanian footballer

Personal information
- Date of birth: 2 May 1999 (age 27)
- Place of birth: Pogradec, Albania
- Height: 1.85 m (6 ft 1 in)
- Position: Centre-back

Team information
- Current team: Akhmat Grozny
- Number: 5

Youth career
- 2007–2016: Tirana

Senior career*
Years	Team	Apps	(Gls)
2017–2019	Tirana B	5	(0)
2017–2019	Tirana	31	(1)
2019–2022	Struga	63	(7)
2022–2026	Shkëndija	106	(10)
2026–	Akhmat Grozny	27	(2)

International career^{‡}
2017	Albania U19	2	(0)
2018	Albania U21	3	(0)
2025–	Albania	1	(0)
- * Club domestic league appearances and goals as of 21 November 2026 ‡ National team caps and goals as of 14 October 2025

Klisman Cake (born 2 May 1999) is an Albanian professional footballer who plays as a centre-back for Akhmat Grozny in the Russian Premier League and the Albania national team.

A graduate of the Tirana academy, Cake made his senior debut in 2016 and was part of the squad that won the Albanian Cup in the 2016–17 season. He later played for Struga in the Macedonian First League, before joining fellow league team Shkëndija Tetovo in January 2022. With Shkëndija, he has appeared in domestic and European competitions, including qualifying rounds of the UEFA Champions League and the UEFA Europa League, managing to qualify for UEFA Conference League group stage in 2025.

Internationally, Cake represented Albania U19 and U21. In October 2025, he received his first call-up to the senior national team.

== Club career ==
=== Early life and youth career ===
Cake was born in Tirana, Albania. He was named after the German football legend Jürgen Klinsmann, reflecting his family's passion for football. Cake started his youth career with local club KF Tirana at the age of 8, joining the club's academy in 2007. He progressed through all the youth levels of the capital side, being promoted to the under-17 team in 2011. During the 2015–16 season, he was named captain of the under-17s and on 10 February 2016 scored a decisive penalty kick in the final of the national U17 cup, helping Tirana defeat Olimpic U17 2–1 and secure the trophy.

=== Tirana ===
In the 2016–17 season, Cake continued his rapid rise through the club's system, featuring for three different levels in the same campaign: the under-19s, Tirana B, and the senior team. He began the season with the under-19 side, but was soon called up to Tirana B, making two appearances.

In the second half of the season, first-team coach Mirel Josa promoted him to the senior squad after the club was hit with a winter transfer ban, relying heavily on academy players such as Grent Halili, Albi Doka, and Marlind Nuriu. After making his first-team debut in 2017, Cake became a consistent member of the senior squad. He featured for Tirana during the 2016–17 season in the Superliga, but Tirana was unable to survive and suffered a relegation to the Albanian First Division — the first in its history. Despite the difficult year, Cake was part of the squad that won the Albanian Cup that season, defeating Skënderbeu Korçë in the final.

Cake remained with Tirana throughout the club's rebuilding phase, playing under several coaches and becoming known for his versatility in defense — capable of operating both as a centre-back and a right-back and thus contributing to Tirana's immediate return to the top flight. In the 2018–19 campaign, he gained further experience in the Albanian Superliga, appearing in both league and cup competitions and maintaining a reputation as one of the academy's most reliable graduates.

During his time with Tirana, Cake also represented the club in European competition, being part of the squad that played in the UEFA Europa League qualifiers. His performances earned praise for maturity and tactical awareness despite his young age, drawing attention from clubs in neighbouring leagues.

By early 2019, after several seasons and more than 70 appearances across all competitions for Tirana's youth, reserve, and senior teams, Cake completed his development phase with the club before moving abroad to continue his professional career.

=== Struga ===
Cake transferred to Struga in August 2019.

He became a regular starter at Struga, making 17 league appearances in the 2019-20 Macedonian First League season and scoring 1 goal.

In the following 2020–21 season, Cake featured in 31 league matches and scored 4 goals, helping Struga compete strongly in the league.

He was selected multiple times in the “Team of the Week” during his time with Struga, and by April 2021 had become known for both defensive stability and occasional goal contributions.

He also played in European competition with Struga. On 15 July 2021, Cake started in the UEFA Europa Conference League first qualifying round match against Liepāja.

During his time at Struga, he made around 65 appearances, scoring 7 goals and contributing 3 assists across all competitions.

=== Shkëndija ===
On 10 January 2022, Cake signed for Shkëndija Tetovo in the Macedonian First League and quickly integrated into the squad of the reigning Macedonian champions.

Cake made his competitive debut for Shkëndija in the domestic league and also appeared in qualification rounds of the UEFA Champions League and later the UEFA Europa League, gaining his first experience in European competitions. Cake made his European debut on 6 July 2022 in the UEFA Champions League first qualifying round, starting in a match against Shkupi at the Toše Proeski Arena in Skopje. He later featured in additional UEFA qualifying rounds, including appearances in the UEFA Europa Conference League, gaining further international experience.

During his spell in Tetovo, he played over 60 matches in all competitions, scoring several goals and contributing defensively in league and cup fixtures.

=== Akhmat Grozny ===
On 10 January 2026, Cake signed a three-and-a-half-year contract with Russian Premier League club Akhmat Grozny

== International career ==
Cake received his first international call-up in April 2017 to the Albania under-19 team by coach Erjon Bogdani for a gathering in Durrës, Albania, where they also played two friendly matches.

In the spring of 2018 (May–June), Cake was called up to the Albania U21 by coach Alban Bushi and featured in three friendly matches.

On 3 October 2025, Cake was included in the senior Albania squad by head coach Sylvinho for a 2026 FIFA World Cup qualification match against Serbia on 11 October 2025 and a friendly match against Jordan on 14 October 2025.

== Career statistics ==
=== Club ===
As of 21 November 2026

Appearances and goals by club, season and competition
Club	Season	League			Cup		Europe (Note: Including continental competitions, such as UEFA Champions League and UEFA Europa League)		Total	
Club	Season	Division	Apps	Goals	Apps	Goals	Apps	Goals	Apps	Goals
Tirana B	2016–17	Kategoria e Dytë	2	0	—		—		2	0
Tirana B	2017–18	Kategoria e Dytë	2	0	—		—		2	0
Tirana B	Total		4	0	—		—		4	0
Tirana	2016–17	Kategoria Superiore	9	0	2	0	—		11	0
Tirana	2017–18	Kategoria e Parë	5	0	0	0	0	0	5	0
Tirana	2018–19	Kategoria Superiore	2	0	0	0	0	0	2	0
Tirana	Total		16	0	2	0	0	0	18	0
Struga	2019–20	Macedonian First League	17	1	1	1	—		18	2
Struga	2020–21	Macedonian First League	31	4	1	0	–	–	32	4
Struga	2021–22	Macedonian First League	15	2	2	0	2	0	19	2
Struga	Total		63	7	4	1	2	0	69	8
Shkëndija	2021–22	Macedonian First League	11	0	—		—		11	0
Shkëndija	2022–23	Macedonian First League	25	3	1	0	6	0	32	3
Shkëndija	2023–24	Macedonian First League	32	5	1	1	2	0	35	6
Shkëndija	2024–25	Macedonian First League	32	2	1	0	2	1	35	3
Shkëndija	2025–26	Macedonian First League	6	0	1	0	14	0	21	0
Shkëndija	Total		106	10	4	1	24	1	134	12
Akhmat Grozny	2025–26	Russian Premier League	12	1	—		—		12	1
Akhmat Grozny	2026–27	Russian Premier League	15	1	5	0	—		20	1
Akhmat Grozny	Total		27	2	5	0	0	0	32	2
Career total			216	19	15	2	26	1	257	22

=== International ===
As of match played 14 October 2025

Appearances and goals by national team and year
National team	Year	Apps	Goals
Albania
Albania	2025	1	0
Total		1	0

== Honours ==
Shkëndija

- Macedonian First League: 2024–25

Tirana

- Albanian Cup: 2016–17
- Albanian Supercup: 2017
- Albanian First Division: 2017–18
