= Orgest =

- Gender: Male

Origin
- Region of origin: Albania

Other names
- Related names: Orges

Orgest is an Albanian masculine given name. Notable people bearing the name Orgest include:

- Orgest Buzi (born 1994), Albanian footballer
- Orgest Gava (born 1990), Albanian footballer
- Orgest Serjani (born 1988), Albanian footballer
