= Patrik Bardhi =

Albanian professional footballer

Personal information
- Full name: Patrik Bardhi
- Date of birth: 21 May 1998 (age 28)
- Place of birth: Tirana, Albania
- Height: 1.83 m (6 ft 0 in)
- Position: Forward

Team information
- Current team: Vllaznia Shkodër
- Number: 11

Youth career
- 2016: Akademia e Futbollit
- 2017: Tirana

Senior career*
Years	Team	Apps	(Gls)
2017–2018	Tirana	12	(1)
2018–2021	Kastrioti Krujë	84	(4)
2021–2024	Dinamo Tirana	55	(4)
2024–2026	Vora	54	(3)
2026–	Vllaznia Shkodër	0	(0)
- * Club domestic league appearances and goals as of 1 August 2025

Patrik Bardhi (born 21 May 1998) is an Albanian professional footballer who plays as a forward for Albanian club Vllaznia Shkodër .

== Club career ==
=== Tirana ===
Bardhi was promoted to Tirana's senior squad by manager Zé Maria during the 2017–18 season, featuring as an unused substitute in Tirana's 2–0 home defeat of Turbina Cërrik. He made his professional debut on 18 November 2017 in the 2–0 win over Apolonia Fier. His first score-sheet contributions came in his third appearance for the club, netting in the 84th minute of a 4–0 win at Naftëtari Kuçovë.

Bardhi ended his first season by making 12 league appearances and scoring twice as Tirana easily achieved promotion back to Albanian Superliga after only one season. Following the end of the season, Bardhi was not given a contract and he left as a free agent.

=== Kastrioti Krujë ===
On 9 August 2018, the newly promoted Albanian Superliga side Kastrioti Krujë announced to have signed Bardhi on a three-year deal. He initially came on trial before signing. He was given squad number 14, and made his club debut as well as his first top flight appearance on the opening day of 2018–19 Albanian Superliga against Luftëtari Gjirokastër on 18 August, winning a penalty kick after being fouled on zone which was successfully scored by Sokol Mziu for a 1–0 win.

== Career statistics ==
As of 18 August 2018

Club statistics
Club	Season	League			Cup		Europe		Total	
Club	Season	Division	Apps	Goals	Apps	Goals	Apps	Goals	Apps	Goals
KF Tirana	2017–18	Albanian First Division	12	2	0	0	—		12	2
Kastrioti Krujë	2018–19	Albanian Superliga	1	0	0	0	—		1	0
Career total			13	2	0	0	—		13	2

== Honours ==
Tirana

- Albanian First Division: 2017–18
