= Ervis =

- Gender: Male

Origin
- Region of origin: Albania, Kosovo

Ervis is an Albanian masculine given name and may refer to:

- Ervis Çaço (born 1989), an Albanian footballer.
- Ervis Kaja (born 1987), an Albanian footballer.
- Ervis Koçi (born 1984), an Albanian footballer.
- Ervis Kraja (born 1983), an Albanian footballer.
