= Bedri Greca =

Albanian footballer

Personal information
- Full name: Bedri Greca
- Date of birth: 23 October 1990 (age 36)
- Place of birth: Tirana, PSR Albania
- Height: 1.83 m (6 ft 0 in)
- Position: Winger

Team information
- Current team: Besa Kavajë
- Number: 91

Youth career
- 2010–2011: Skrapari

Senior career*
Years	Team	Apps	(Gls)
2011–2012	Skrapari	20	(1)
2012–2015	Tërbuni Pukë	76	(22)
2015–2016	Flamurtari Vlorë	17	(4)
2016–2017	Kukësi	17	(1)
2017–2019	Tirana	55	(19)
2019–2020	Gjilani	14	(3)
2020	Laçi	18	(1)
2020–2021	Feronikeli	10	(3)
2021–2023	Kastrioti Krujë	65	(11)
2023–2024	Elbasani	28	(18)
2025–	Besa Kavajë	0	(0)
- * Club domestic league appearances and goals as of 1 June 2024

Bedri Greca (born 23 October 1990) is an Albanian professional footballer who plays as a midfielder for KF Besa Kavajë.

== Club career ==
=== Flamurtari Vlorë ===
On 30 June 2015, Greca joined Flamurtari Vlorë on a one-year contract. He was distinguished for his performances in the first part of the season. The second part of the season was not a good as the first however, as he was suspended in February of the following year.

=== Kukësi ===
On 21 June 2016, Greca signed with Kukësi for an undisclosed fee, signing a one-year deal. He was handed squad number 7, and made his competitive nine days later in team's first leg of 2016–17 UEFA Europa League first qualifying round against Rudar Pljevlja, appearing in the last nine minutes of a 1–1 away draw. On 24 August, he won his first silverware, the 2016 Albanian Supercup, playing in the last 24 minutes of a 3–1 triumph against Skënderbeu Korçë at Selman Stërmasi Stadium. On 11 June 2017, Greca left the club after his contract expired and the parties decided not to cooperate anymore.

=== Tirana ===
On 4 September 2017, Greca joined Tirana in the Albanian First Division by signing a contract until June 2019. He was presented on the same day and was given squad number 7, stating: "Tirana is a dream for me, I've always has been a fan of them". On 6 September 2017, Greca made his first appearance for Tirana in the 2017 Albanian Supercup against Kukësi; the team won 1–0 thanks to a late goal scored by Erion Hoxhallari. This win constituted his first trophy win at Tirana. He scored his maiden goal for the team on 21 October on matchday 5 of 2017–18 Albanian First Division against Turbina Cërrik where he took a ball from the midfield and scored after getting past the goalkeeper for a 2–0 win, helping the team to maintain their winning start. Greca scored his second Tirana goal on 29 November in a 2017–18 Albanian Cup second round match versus Vllaznia Shkodër as the team won 2–0 at home. It was Tirana's first win over Vllaznia in 5 matches and the first since May 2016.

Greca made an impressive improvement in the second part of the season, starting a scoring streak; he netted his first goal in 2018 in the 2–1 win at Turbina Cërrik on 3 February, which was followed by another one in the 3–1 win over Tomori Berat six days later. In March, Greca would score three more goals, including his first brace of the season in Tirana's 5–1 away defeat of Apolonia Fier. On 7 April, Greca scored both Tirana goals in the 2–0 win against Bylis Ballsh at Adush Muça Stadium; this win extended Tirana's lead to Bylis up to 10 points, meaning that the capital club would need only one point to clinch the first place in Group B. This was made official next week when Tirana won 3–2 versus Pogradeci, with Greca netting the third goal for the team.

Later that month, in the match against Tomori Berat, Greca would come as a late substitute and scored a free-kick which saved Tirana from the defeat as the match ended in a 2–2 draw. He was the main protagonist in the final Group B match against Bylis Ballsh, netting another brace as Tirana was crowned as Group B winners. The goals made him the joint top-scorer of the team along with Yunus Sentamu. Greca was at the double again in the final match against Group A winners Kastrioti Krujë, which lifted his tally to 14 goals, as Tirana as named Albanian First Division champion of the 2017–18 season.

== Personal life ==
In an interview, Greca unveiled that he is a long-life fan of Tirana and his favourite footballer is former player Indrit Fortuzi.

== Career statistics ==
As of 29 November 2017

Club	Season	League			Cup		Europa		Other		Total	
Club	Season	Division	Apps	Goals	Apps	Goals	Apps	Goals	Apps	Goals	Apps	Goals
Skrapari	2011–12	Albanian First Division	20	1	0	0	—		—		20	1
Tërbuni Pukë	2012–13	Albanian First Division	27	4	0	0	—		—		27	4
Tërbuni Pukë	2013–14	Albanian First Division	25	3	1	0	—		—		26	3
Tërbuni Pukë	2014–15	Albanian First Division	24	15	3	2	—		—		27	17
Tërbuni Pukë	Total		76	22	4	2	—		—		80	24
Flamurtari Vlorë	2015–16	Albanian Superliga	17	4	3	0	—		—		20	4
Kukësi	2016–17	Albanian Superliga	17	1	2	1	2 (Note: All appearance(s) in UEFA Europa League)	0	1 (Note: Appearance in Albanian Supercup)	0	22	2
Tirana	2017–18	Albanian First Division	24	15	6	1	—		1	0	31	15
Career total			154	43	15	4	2	0	2	0	173	47

== Honours ==
Kukësi

- Albanian Superliga: 2016–17
- Albanian Supercup: 2016

Tirana

- Albanian Supercup: 2017
- Albanian First Division Group B: 2017–18
- Albanian First Division: 2017–18
