= Jurgen Vrapi =

Albanian footballer

Personal information
- Date of birth: 14 November 1998 (age 27)
- Place of birth: Tirana, Albania
- Height: 1.75 m (5 ft 9 in)
- Position: Midfielder

Team information
- Current team: Vora
- Number: 10

Youth career
- 2011–2016: Tirana
- 2016–2017: Lokomotiva Zagreb

Senior career*
Years	Team	Apps	(Gls)
2017–2018	Tirana	8	(2)
2018–2019	Dinamo Tirana	23	(4)
2019–2020	Flamurtari	24	(1)
2020–2021	Tirana	20	(0)
2021–2022	Skënderbeu	20	(0)
2022–	Vora	82	(2)

International career^{‡}
2015–2016	Albania U19	3	(0)
- * Club domestic league appearances and goals as of 13 May 2026 ‡ National team caps and goals as of 31 January 2017

Jurgen Vrapi (born 14 November 1998) is an Albanian professional footballer who plays as a midfielder for Vora.

== Club career ==
=== Early career ===
Vrapi started his youth career aged 13 at KF Tirana Reserves and Academy in 2011. In the 2016–17 season he played for the under-19 side 11 matches and made 3 appearances for KF Tirana B in the 2016–17 Albanian Second Division. In February 2017 he moved abroad at Croatian side Lokomotiva Zagreb.

=== Dinamo Tirana ===
On 29 August 2018, fellow capital club Dinamo Tirana signed Vrapi on a one-year contract.

== International career ==
Vrapi received his first call up to the Albania national under-19 team by coach Altin Lala for the friendly tournament Roma Caput Mundi in Rome, Italy between 8–13 March 2015 against Malta U-19, Wales U-19 and Italy U-19. He was called up again to the Albania under-19 almost 1 year later by coach Arjan Bellaj for the next friendly tournament Roma Caput Mundi from 29 February–4 March 2016.

== Career statistics ==
=== Club ===
As of 13 December 2017

Club statistics
Club	Season	League			Cup		Europe (Note: Including continental competitions, such as UEFA Champions League and UEFA Europa League)		Other (Note: Including other competitions, such as Albanian Supercup)		Total	
Club	Season	Division	Apps	Goals	Apps	Goals	Apps	Goals	Apps	Goals	Apps	Goals
Tirana B	2016–17	Albanian Second Division	3	0	—		—		—		3	0
Tirana B	2017–18	Albanian Second Division	8	8	—		—		—		8	8
Tirana B	Total		11	8	—		—		—		11	8
Tirana	2017–18	Albanian First Division	1	0	0	0	—		—		1	0
Career total			12	8	0	0	—		—		12	8

== Honours ==
Tirana

- Albanian First Division: 2017–18
