= Rei Qilimi =

Albanian footballer

Personal information
- Date of birth: 10 June 1996 (age 30)
- Place of birth: Sarandë, Albania
- Position: Attacking midfielder

Team information
- Current team: Egnatia
- Number: 13

Youth career
- 2011–2013: Dinamo Tirana
- 2013–2016: Partizani Tirana

Senior career*
Years	Team	Apps	(Gls)
2014–2015	Partizani Tirana	0	(0)
2016	Dinamo Tirana	1	(0)
2016–2019	Tirana B	24	(6)
2017–2018	Tirana	10	(2)
2019–2018	Egnatia	2	(0)
- * Club domestic league appearances and goals as of 4 October 2019

Rei Qilimi (born 10 June 1996) is an Albanian former professional footballer who last played as an attacking midfielder for Albanian club Egnatia and the Albania national under-21 football team.

== Club career ==
Qilimi started his youth career with Dinamo Tirana aged 14. After spending 2 seasons here, he moved at Partizani Tirana. At Partizani he was promoted to the first team during the 2014–season but didn't made its first team debut. In February 2016 he was returned to Dinamo Tirana where he managed to make his professional debut and played until 10 October 2016 where he signed with Tirana B. During the 2016–17 season he played 22 matches in the Albanian Second Division, where in most of them he was the team's captain and managed to score 6 goals.

== International career ==
Qilimi received his first international call up at the Albania national under-21 football team by coach Alban Bushi for a gathering between 14 and 17 May 2017 with most of the players selected from Albanian championships.

== Career statistics ==
=== Club ===
As of 17 December 2017

Club statistics
Club	Season	League			Cup		Europe (Note: Including continental competitions, such as UEFA Champions League and UEFA Europa League)		Other (Note: Including other competitions, such as Albanian Supercup)		Total	
Club	Season	Division	Apps	Goals	Apps	Goals	Apps	Goals	Apps	Goals	Apps	Goals
Partizani Tirana	2014–15	Albanian Superliga	0	0	0	0	—		—		0	0
Dinamo Tirana	2015–16	Albanian First Division	1	0	—		—		—		1	0
Tirana B	2016–17	Albanian Second Division	20	6	—		—		—		20	6
Tirana B	2017–18	Albanian Second Division	4	0	—		—		—		4	0
Tirana B	Total		24	6	—		—		—		24	6
Tirana	2017–18	Albanian First Division	6	1	1	0	2 (Note: Appearances in the UEFA Europa League)	0	—		9	1
Career total			31	7	1	0	2	0	—		34	7

== Honours ==
Tirana

- Albanian Supercup (1) : 2017
- Albanian First Division : Winner Group B
- Albanian First Division : 2017-2018
