= Marlind Nuriu =

Albanian footballer

Personal information
- Full name: Marlind Lutfi Nuriu
- Date of birth: 5 July 1997 (age 29)
- Place of birth: Tirana, Albania
- Height: 1.84 m (6 ft 0 in)
- Position: Defender

Youth career
- 2011–2013: KDK
- 2013–: Tirana

Senior career*
Years	Team	Apps	(Gls)
2014–2019	Tirana	4	(0)
2017	→ Tirana B	14	(0)
2018–2019	→ Dinamo Tirana (loan)	37	(0)
2019–2020	Skënderbeu Korçë	0	(0)
2020–2022	Tirana	22	(0)
2022	→ Kastrioti (loan)	0	(0)

International career^{‡}
2017–2018	Albania U21	5	(0)
- * Club domestic league appearances and goals as of 26 May 2022 ‡ National team caps and goals as of 11 September 2018

Marlind Lutfi Nuriu (born 5 July 1997) is an Albanian professional footballer who plays as a defender.

== Club career ==
=== Early career ===
Nuriu started his youth career at a local club in Tirana KDK. In 2013, he moved at KF Tirana academy and in 2014 he signed for the club's first team.

=== Tirana ===
He made his debut for Tirana on 28 September 2016 in the Albanian Cup match against Sopoti Librazhd.

==== Loan to Dinamo Tirana ====
On 9 January 2018 Nuriu was loaned out to fellow Albanian First Division side Dinamo Tirana for the remainder of the 2017–18 season to gain more playing experience.

== International career ==
=== Albania U21 ===
He was called up at the Albania national under-21 football team by coach Alban Bushi for a double Friendly match against Moldova U21 on 25 & 27 March 2017.

==== 2019 UEFA European Under-21 Championship qualification ====
Nuriu was called up for the Friendly match against France U21 on 5 June 2017 and the 2019 UEFA European Under-21 Championship qualification opening match against Estonia U21 on 12 June 2017. In the opening match of the qualifiers against Estonia U21, Nuriu was an unused substitute in the bench for the entire match.

== Career statistics ==
=== Club ===
As of 10 January 2018

Club statistics
Club	Season	League			Cup		Europe (Note: Including continental competitions, such as UEFA Champions League and UEFA Europa League)		Other (Note: Including other competitions, such as Albanian Supercup)		Total	
Club	Season	Division	Apps	Goals	Apps	Goals	Apps	Goals	Apps	Goals	Apps	Goals
Tirana	2014–15	Albanian Superliga	0	0	—		—		—		0	0
Tirana	2015–16	Albanian Superliga	0	0	0	0	—		—		0	0
Tirana	2016–17	Albanian Superliga	2	0	2	0	—		—		4	0
Tirana	2017–18	Albanian First Division	2	0	1	0	0	0	0	0	3	0
Tirana	Total		4	0	3	0	0	0	0	0	7	0
Tirana B	2016–17	Albanian Second Division	10	0	—		—		—		10	0
Tirana B	2017–18	Albanian Second Division	4	0	—		—		—		4	0
Total			14	0	—		—		—		14	0
Dinamo Tirana	2017–18	Albanian First Division	—		—		—		—		10	0
Career total			18	0	3	0	0	0	0	0	21	0

== Honours ==
=== Club ===
Tirana

- Kategoria Superiore: 2021–22
- Albanian Cup: 2016–17
- Albanian Supercup: 2017
