= Mirel Duka =

Albanian footballer (born 1991)

Personal information
- Date of birth: 9 January 1991 (age 35)
- Place of birth: Kavajë, Albania
- Position: Midfielder

Team information
- Current team: Egnatia
- Number: 14

Senior career*
Years	Team	Apps	(Gls)
2010–2012	Besa	48	(1)
2012–2013	Shkumbini	17	(1)
2013–2015	Luftëtari	48	(2)
2015–2016	Besa	22	(1)
2016–2017	Erzeni	25	(1)
2017–2018	Besa	15	(0)
2018	Korabi	13	(0)
2019	Tomori	9	(0)
2019–	Egnatia	3	(0)

International career
- Albania U-19
- * Club domestic league appearances and goals as of 2 October 2019

Mirel Duka (born 9 January 1991) is an Albanian football player. He plays as a midfielder for Egnatia football club in Albania's First Division.
