= Alessio Abibi =

Albanian footballer (born 1996)

Personal information
- Date of birth: 4 December 1996 (age 29)
- Place of birth: Umbertide, Italy
- Height: 1.96 m (6 ft 5 in)
- Position: Goalkeeper

Youth career
- 2010–2013: Pescara
- 2013–2014: → Perugia

Senior career*
Years	Team	Apps	(Gls)
2014–2015	Foligno	18	(0)
2015–2016	Altovicentino	34	(0)
2017	Eldense	12	(0)
2017–2019	Tirana B	2	(0)
2017–2019	Tirana	45	(0)
2019–2020	Avellino	12	(0)
2020	Cavese	0	(0)
2020	Kastrioti	0	(0)
2021	Dundalk	20	(0)
2022–2024	Perugia	4	(0)

International career
2015–2016	Albania U19	6	(0)
- * Club domestic league appearances and goals as of 4 May 2024

Alessio Abibi (born 4 December 1996) is a professional footballer who plays as a goalkeeper. Born in Italy, he has represented Albania at youth level.

== Club career ==
In August 2019, he joined Serie C club Avellino.

On 31 January 2020 he moved to Cavese.

On 10 September 2020 he joined KF Kastrioti. He left the club again two months later.

On 5 January 2021 he signed for League of Ireland Premier Division side Dundalk following the departure of both Gary Rogers (retirement) and Aaron McCarey (Cliftonville) from his new club. Abibi made his competitive debut for the club on 12 March 2021 in the 2021 President's Cup which his side won 4–3 on penalties after a 1–1 draw with Abibi preventing 3 Shamrock Rovers players from scoring in the shootout to win the trophy.

On 3 November 2022 he joined Perugia until 30 June 2024.

== Honours ==
=== Club ===
Tirana

- Albanian Supercup: 2017
- Albanian First Division : Winner Group B
- Albanian First Division : 2017-2018

Dundalk

- President's Cup: 2021
