= Alked Çelhaka =

Albanian footballer

Personal information
- Date of birth: 7 August 1994 (age 32)
- Place of birth: Kavajë, Albania
- Height: 1.78 m (5 ft 10 in)
- Position: Midfielder

Youth career
- 2008–2013: Besa Kavajë

Senior career*
Years	Team	Apps	(Gls)
2012–2016	Besa Kavajë	55	(10)
2016–2017	Laçi	23	(1)
2017–2018	Tirana	20	(1)
2018–2020	Besa Kavajë	39	(12)
2020–2021	Egnatia	20	(1)
2021–2022	Flamurtari	0	(0)
2022–2023	AF Elbasani		
- * Club domestic league appearances and goals as of 10 February 2022

Alked Çelhaka (born 7 August 1994) is an Albanian professional footballer who plays as a midfielder.

== Club career ==
=== Tirana ===
On 4 September 2017, Çelhaka joined Tirana on a three-year contract in club's first ever Albanian First Division season. He debuted two days later by playing in the 2017 Albanian Supercup against Kukësi which was won 1–0. This win constituted his first trophy win at Tirana. He made his first league appearance in the opening day against Iliria on 16 September. His first score-sheet contributions came later on 18 November where he scored the second of the 2–0 win over Apolonia Fier.

=== Flamurtari ===
On 11 September 2021, Çelhaka joined Flamurtari FC.

== Career statistics ==
As of 18 November 2017

Club statistics
Club	Season	League			Cup		Europe		Other		Total	
Club	Season	Division	Apps	Goals	Apps	Goals	Apps	Goals	Apps	Goals	Apps	Goals
Besa Kavajë	2011–12	Albanian Superliga	1	0	0	0	—		—		1	0
Besa Kavajë	2012–13	Albanian Superliga	0	0	0	0	—		—		0	0
Besa Kavajë	2013–14	Albanian Superliga	7	1	4	2	—		—		11	3
Besa Kavajë	2014–15	Albanian First Division	23	1	1	0	—		—		24	1
Besa Kavajë	2015–16	Albanian First Division	24	8	0	0	—		—		24	8
Besa Kavajë	Total		55	10	5	2	—		—		25	0
Laçi	2016–17	Albanian Superliga	24	1	6	0	—		—		30	1
Tirana	2017–18	Albanian First Division	5	1	2	0	—		1 (Note: Appearance in Albanian Supercup)	0	8	1
Career total			83	11	13	2	0	0	1	0	97	13

== Honours ==
Tirana

- Albanian Supercup: 2017
- Albanian First Division : Winner Group B
- Albanian First Division : 2017-2018
