= Kristi Joti =

Albanian footballer

Personal information
- Full name: Kristi Joti
- Date of birth: 15 January 1998 (age 28)
- Place of birth: Tirana, Albania
- Position: Midfielder

Team information
- Current team: Korabi
- Number: 21

Youth career
- KF Tirana

Senior career*
Years	Team	Apps	(Gls)
2016–2017	Tirana	0	(0)
2017–2019	Kukësi	11	(0)
2018	→ Tomori (loan)	6	(0)
2020	Luzi 2008	12	(0)
2020–	Korabi	75	(5)
- * Club domestic league appearances and goals as of 20 May 2023

Kristi Joti (born 15 January 1998) is an Albanian footballer who currently plays for KF Korabi Peshkopi in the Kategoria e Parë.

== Club career ==
=== Kukësi ===
In August 2017, Joti moved to Albanian Superliga club FK Kukësi. He made his league debut for the club on 2 December 2017 in a 2–1 away loss to KF Skënderbeu Korçë. He was subbed on for Eni Imami in the 85th minute.

=== Tomori Berat ===
In August 2018, Joti was loaned out to Albanian First Division club FK Tomori Berat. He made his competitive debut for the club on 9 September 2018 in a 1–1 home draw with Lushnja, playing 89 minutes before being replaced by Ardian Gega.

== Honours ==
Kukësi

- Albanian Superliga Runner-Up: 2017–18
- Albanian Supercup Runner-Up: 2017–18
