= Wellyson =

Brazilian footballer

Personal information
- Full name: Wellyson Luiz de Oliveira Sobrau
- Date of birth: 6 March 1994 (age 32)
- Place of birth: Campinas, Brazil
- Height: 1.88 m (6 ft 2 in)
- Position: Defensive midfielder

Youth career
- 2010–2015: Guarani

Senior career*
Years	Team	Apps	(Gls)
2013–2014	Guarani	11	(0)
2015	Ceahlăul	13	(0)
2015	Taboão da Serra	23	(2)
2015	→ Ceahlăul Piatra Neamț (loan)	13	(0)
2016	Rio Preto		
2016	Coimbra		
2017	Patrocinense		
2017	Tirana	12	(0)
2018	AFC Eskilstuna	16	(1)
2019–2022	Moto Club	3	(0)
2022	Manauara		
2023	São Luiz		
- * Club domestic league appearances and goals as of 20:35, 27 June 2019 (UTC)

Wellyson Luiz de Oliveira Sobrau (born Mar 6, 1994), known as Wellyson, is a Brazilian former professional footballer who played as a defensive midfielder.

Wellyson played for Guarani FC in the Campeonato Paulista in 2013 and 2014.

== Honours ==
Tirana

- Albanian Supercup: 2017
