= Alvaro Bishaj =

Albanian footballer

Personal information
- Full name: Alvaro Bishaj
- Date of birth: 2 October 1991 (age 35)
- Place of birth: Vlorë, Albania
- Height: 1.85 m (6 ft 1 in)
- Position: Centre back

Team information
- Current team: Devolli
- Number: 24

Youth career
- 2005–2009: Flamurtari Vlorë

Senior career*
Years	Team	Apps	(Gls)
2008–2015	Flamurtari	13	(0)
2011	→ KF Vlora (loan)	14	(0)
2012	→ Tomori (loan)	6	(1)
2014–2015	→ Tomori (loan)	23	(1)
2015–2016	Korabi	25	(2)
2016–2017	Sopoti	24	(0)
2017–2018	Tirana B	1	(0)
2017–2018	Tirana	9	(1)
2020–	Devolli		
- * Club domestic league appearances and goals

Alvaro Bishaj (born 2 October 1991) is an Albanian footballer who plays for KF Devolli in the Kategoria e Dytë.

== Career ==
On 23 January 2020, Bishaj signed a one-year contract with Kategoria e Dytë club KF Devolli.

== Honours ==
=== Club ===
Flamurtari

- Albanian Cup: (2) 2008–09, 2013–14

Tirana

- Albanian Supercup: (1) 2017
- Albanian First Division : Winner Group B
- Albanian First Division : 2017–2018
