= Albi Doka =

Albanian footballer

Personal information
- Date of birth: 26 June 1997 (age 29)
- Place of birth: Tirana, Albania
- Height: 1.81 m (5 ft 11 in)
- Position: Right back

Team information
- Current team: Teuta
- Number: 17

Youth career
- 2007–2016: Tirana

Senior career*
| Years | Team | Apps | (Gls) |
| 2016–2020 | Tirana B | 13 | (5) |
| 2017–2020 | Tirana | 91 | (5) |
| 2020–2022 | HNK Gorica | 36 | (1) |
| 2022 | → Budapest Honvéd (loan) | 13 | (0) |
| 2022–2023 | Budapest Honvéd | 22 | (0) |
| 2023–2024 | Tirana | 18 | (1) |
| 2024 | Újpest | 5 | (0) |
| 2024–2025 | Skënderbeu | 21 | (0) |
| 2025– | Teuta | 7 | (0) |

International career^{‡}
| 2017–2019 | Albania U21 | 5 | (0) |
| 2020– | Albania | 7 | (0) |
- * Club domestic league appearances and goals as of 18 October 2023 ‡ National team caps and goals as of 11 November 2020

Albi Doka (born 26 June 1997) is an Albanian professional footballer who plays as a right back for Albanian club Teuta.

== Club career ==
=== Early career ===
Doka started his youth career at KF Tirana local academy Xheraldina, playing principally with under-15 side. In 2013 he moved at KF Tirana Academies to play for under-17 team.

=== Tirana ===
Doka was promoted to Tirana senior team at the start of 2017. On 5 February 2017 Doka made his Kategoria Superiore debut playing the full 90 minutes match against Laçi in a 1–0 loss. He played in an Albanian Cup match against Kukësi helping his team winning 2–1.

=== Honvéd ===
On 11 February 2022, Doka joined Budapest Honvéd in Hungary on loan. Honvéd made the transfer permanent in June 2022.

== International career ==
=== Albania U21 ===
==== 2019 UEFA European Under-21 Championship qualification ====
Following an impressive season with Tirana for being an undisputed starter, Doka received his first international call up at the Albania national under-21 football team by coach Alban Bushi for the Friendly match against France U21 on 5 June 2017 and the 2019 UEFA European Under-21 Championship qualification opening match against Estonia U21 on 12 June 2017. He made his competitive debut for Albania U21 against Estonia U21 on 12 June 2017 playing the full 90-minutes match in a goalless draw.

=== Albania national team ===
Doka made his international debut for Albania on 11 November 2020 in a friendly match against Kosovo.

== Career statistics ==
=== Club ===
As of 15 May 2022

Club statistics
| Club | Season | League | | | Cup | | Europe (Note: Including continental competitions, such as UEFA Champions League and UEFA Europa League) | | Other (Note: Including other competitions, such as Albanian Supercup) | | Total | |
| Club | Season | Division | Apps | Goals | Apps | Goals | Apps | Goals | Apps | Goals | Apps | Goals |
|---|---|---|---|---|---|---|---|---|---|---|---|---|
| Tirana B | 2016–17 | Kategoria e Dytë | 13 | 5 | — | | — | | — | | 13 | 5 |
| Tirana | 2016–17 | Kategoria Superiore | 17 | 0 | 5 | 0 | — | | — | | 22 | 0 |
| Tirana | 2017–18 | Kategoria e Parë | 13 | 1 | 4 | 0 | 2 (Note: Appearances in the UEFA Europa League) | 0 | 1 (Note: One appearance in the 2017 Albanian Supercup) | 0 | 20 | 1 |
| Tirana | 2018–19 | Kategoria Superiore | 31 | 4 | 6 | 0 | — | | — | | 37 | 4 |
| Tirana | 2019–20 | Kategoria Superiore | 30 | 0 | 6 | 0 | — | | — | | 36 | 0 |
| Tirana | Total | | 91 | 5 | 21 | 0 | 2 | 0 | 1 | 0 | 115 | 5 |
| HNK Gorica | 2020–21 | 1. HNL | 23 | 1 | 2 | 0 | — | | — | | 25 | 1 |
| HNK Gorica | 2021–22 | 1. HNL | 13 | 0 | 2 | 0 | — | | — | | 15 | 0 |
| HNK Gorica | Total | | 36 | 1 | 4 | 0 | 0 | 0 | 0 | 0 | 40 | 1 |
| Budapest Honvéd | 2021–22 | Nemzeti Bajnokság I | 13 | 0 | 1 | 0 | — | | — | | 14 | 0 |
| Career total | | | 153 | 11 | 26 | 0 | 2 | 0 | 1 | 0 | 182 | 11 |

== Honours ==
=== Club ===
Tirana

- Kategoria Superiore: 2019–20
- Albanian Cup: 2016–17
- Albanian Supercup: 2017
- Kategoria e Parë : Winner Group B
- Kategoria e Parë : 2017-2018
