= Orgest Serjani =

Albanian footballer

Personal information
- Full name: Orgest Serjani
- Date of birth: 11 November 1988 (age 37)
- Place of birth: Vlorë, Albania
- Position: Midfielder

Youth career
- 2006–2008: Flamurtari

Senior career*
Years	Team	Apps	(Gls)
2008-2009	Flamurtari	3	(0)
2009-2010	Apolonia	0	(0)
2010-2011	→ Vlora (loan)	30	(1)
2012-2013	Dinamo Tirana	29	(0)

International career^{‡}
2006–2007	Albania U-19	2	(0)
- * Club domestic league appearances and goals as of 14 June 2009 ‡ National team caps and goals as of 14 June 2009

Orgest Serjani (born 11 November 1988) is an Albanian football player who most recently played as a midfielder for Dinamo Tirana in the Albanian First Division.

== Club career ==
Serjani joined was promoted from the youth setup at Flamurtari Vlorë before the start of the 2008–2009 season. He had previously played for the youth teams at the club and had even won the league at under-18 level. The midfielder made his senior league debut on 22 February 2009 in a home match against champions of Albania, Dinamo Tirana. Serjani came on in the 73rd minute for Taulant Kuqi in the 2–0 loss. He made another 2 appearances during the 2008–2009 campaign, he also started both games and played the full 90 minutes against both KS Teuta Durres and Besa Kavaje in the last two games of the season.

He later played for Dinamo.
