= Michael Ngoo =

English footballer

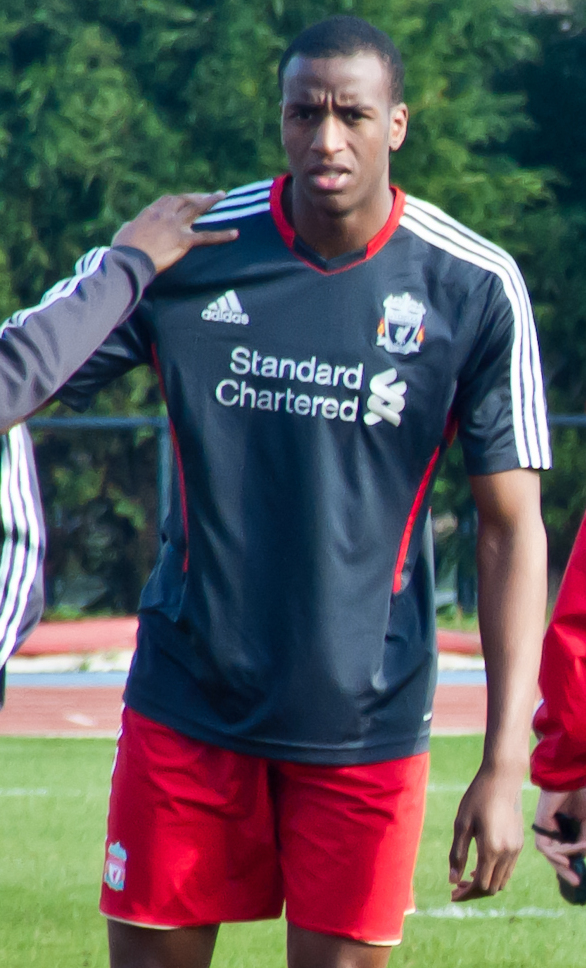

Personal information
- Full name: Michael Ayodeji D. Ngoo
- Date of birth: 23 October 1992 (age 34)
- Place of birth: Walthamstow, London, England
- Height: 6 ft 6 in (1.98 m)
- Position: Striker

Youth career
- 2008–2009: Southend United
- 2009–2013: Liverpool

Senior career*
Years	Team	Apps	(Gls)
2013–2014	Liverpool	0	(0)
2013	→ Heart of Midlothian (loan)	15	(4)
2013	→ Yeovil Town (loan)	6	(0)
2014	→ Walsall (loan)	14	(1)
2014–2015	Kilmarnock	6	(0)
2016–2017	Bromley	1	(0)
2017	Oldham Athletic	13	(0)
2017–2020	Tirana	72	(28)
2018	→ Tirana B	2	(1)
2020–2021	Enosis Neon Paralimni	17	(0)
2021–2022	Tirana	14	(4)
2024	Barking	2	(1)

International career
2010–2011	England U19	6	(3)
2011	England U20	3	(0)
- * Club domestic league appearances and goals as of 00:00, 29 December 2024 (UTC)

Michael Ayodeji D. Ngoo (born 23 October 1992) is an English professional footballer who last played for Barking. He has represented England at under-19 and under-20 level.

== Club career ==
=== Early career ===
Ngoo began his career as a youth player for Southend United. In July 2009, he spent time on trial at Manchester United representing them in the Milk Cup at under-16 level, with United winning the tournament.

=== Liverpool ===
In September 2009, aged 16, he signed for Liverpool for a fee that could reach up to £250,000. During the 2010–11 season whilst representing the club's under-18 side he scored 15 goals in 21 appearances. The following season he was the reserve team's top scorer.

On 14 September 2012, having scored the under-21s' final goal in a 4–1 over Chelsea Ngoo revealed a T-shirt bearing the message "96 reasons 4 Justice". Ngoo was booked for the tribute which came in the week that the Hillsborough Independent Panel released their report. In January 2013, he was loaned to Heart of Midlothian to gain first team experience.

At the end of 2013–14 season, he was released by the club.

==== Heart of Midlothian (loan) ====
Having been watched by the club in several of Liverpool's under-21 games on 24 January 2013, it was announced he was set to join Scottish Premier League side Heart of Midlothian (Hearts) on loan until the end of the season, subject to the paperwork being completed. The deal was completed the following day, meaning he teamed up with fellow Liverpool player Danny Wilson who was also on loan at Hearts. Ngoo was given the squad number 21. The following day he made his debut against Inverness Caledonian Thistle in the Scottish League Cup semi-final, scoring Hearts' equalising goal. Hearts won the match 5–4 on penalties after a 1–1 draw, with Ngoo also scoring one of the penalties. On 17 March 2013, he was ultimately a losing finalist as Hearts were beaten 3–2 in the final against St Mirren. Ngoo picked up a shoulder injury which he struggled with towards the end of the season and forced him to miss their 3–0 win over St Mirren on 4 May. In all he played 17 times during his spell in Scotland, scoring five goals. Ngoo commented that he believed he had improved as a player during his time with the Edinburgh side.

==== Yeovil Town (loan) ====
On 10 July 2013, Ngoo signed with newly promoted Championship side Yeovil Town on loan for the 2013–14 season. On 3 August 2013, Ngoo made his Yeovil debut as a half-time substitute in their 1–0 win over Millwall. He made his full debut for Yeovil on 6 August 2013 in a first round League Cup tie at Southend United, he played 82 minutes before being substituted for Kieffer Moore in a 1–0 victory for the Glovers. He made two substitute appearances before his next start at home to Birmingham City and away at Burnley, both matches Yeovil lost. He started Yeovil's next home league game against Derby County, but only lasted 45 minutes in a 3–0 defeat after he was substituted for Andy Williams at half-time. He was again dropped to the substitutes bench on his final two appearances for the club, twice substituted in on both occasions, playing six minutes against Reading and 11 minutes against Queens Park Rangers.

On 9 October 2013, Ngoo returned to Liverpool after his loan spell was ended by mutual agreement.

==== Walsall (loan) ====
On 31 January 2014, Ngoo joined Walsall on loan. On 8 February, Ngoo made his debut against Milton Keynes Dons, he went on to miss a penalty in a 3–0 defeat. On 18 April 2014, Ngoo scored his first goal for the club, with an equalising header in a League One match against Carlisle United in a 1–1 draw.

=== Kilmarnock ===
On 15 August 2014, Ngoo joined Kilmarnock on a two-year deal.

=== Bromley ===
Following his release from Kilmarnock, Ngoo began training with National League side Bromley. The club announced his signing on 19 November 2016 and he made his debut the same day by coming off the bench against Chester in the 78th minute.

=== Oldham Athletic ===
On 20 January 2017, Ngoo signed for League One side Oldham Athletic on a short-term contract until the end of the season. Ngoo was released by Oldham at the end of the 2016–17 season.

=== Tirana ===
In September 2017 he signed for Albanian side Tirana on a one-year contract, with the possibility of a renewal for a second year. Ngoo made his competitive debut in the 2017 Albanian Supercup against Kukësi, entering in the last minutes as Tirana won 1–0 to claim their 11th title. Tirana also set a record by becoming the first Albanian First Division side to win the Supercup. His league debut occurred on 16 September opening matchday of the First Division against Iliria Fushë-Krujë, entering in the second half as Tirana won 1–0 at home. His first score-sheet contributions came in his third appearance for the club on 24 September, netting the second Tirana goal in a 3–0 win at Pogradeci. Three days later, in the return leg of 2017–18 Albanian Cup first round, Ngoo scored both goals as Tirana won 2–0 at home to secure progression to next round 4–1 on aggregate.

Ngoo was recovered from his long-term injury in September 2018, making his top flight debut on 16th in a 3–1 win over Luftëtari Gjirokastër, entering in last minutes of the match in place of Dejan Blazhevski. He endured a difficult start of the season, as he was suspended for 24 hours on 16 October by newly appointed coach Ardian Mema for unacceptable behaviour; the incident happened during a training session when Ngoo refused Mema's orders and also talked back at him. He was also fined €500, and was an unused substitute in Tirana's 0–1 defeat at Flamurtari Vlorë. He was suspended again on 23 October for an unlimited time, and in the final days of October, Ngoo was sent to train with the reserve squad. He made his debut with them on 11 November by scoring in a 3–2 win over Ada Velipojë. The club decided to bring him back to the senior squad two days later. He played in a friendly win over Korabi Peshkopi on 16 November, scoring one of the goals, and was also involved in another debate, this time with teammate Gentian Muça, on who to take a penalty kick; the verbal confrontation almost went physical. Eventually it was Ngoo who took the penalty but he was unsuccessful. The following day, he was once again suspended by the club and was forced to train alone.

He scored his first top-flight goal for the club from an individual effort on 8 December 2018 in a 4–0 win over Kastrioti Krujë. Ngoo improved greatly in the second half of the season, becoming a fan favourite and the on-pitch leader. He also improved his relationship with coach Mema, who in March 2019 praised his performances. His first goal of 2019 came in the first leg of Albanian Cup round of 16 tie against Flamurtari Vlorë, which turned out to be vital as Tirana progressed in quarter-finals 2–1 on aggregate. Again in the competition, Ngoo scored a brace against Laçi in the quarter-final's first leg played at home.

=== Barking ===
On 29 November 2024, after over two years without a club, Ngoo signed for Essex Senior League side Barking.

== International career ==
Ngoo represented England at under-19 level. He was called up to the England squad for the U-20 World Cup in Colombia in 2011, making his debut on 1 August 2011, coming on as a 72nd-minute substitute in a group match against Argentina, replacing Callum McManaman in a 0–0 draw. In all he made three appearances at the tournament. He is also eligible to represent Nigeria through his mother, and Cameroon through his grandfather.

== Style of play ==
Ngoo has compared to Italian striker Mario Balotelli for his behaviour and relationships with managers. The player himself, however, has denied the comparisons, despite holding the squad number 45, a number which Balotelli has worn for most of his career. In the field, Ngoo possesses a powerful header and is also an aerial threat, due to his height. Despite his large stature, Ngoo is uncommonly agile for a player of his size, and is able to play well with his back to goal, defending the ball with his large and strong body. He has also been praised for his selflessness, and his vision, being able to find his teammates with accuracy from close and long range; despite being a target man, Ngoo was the top assist provider for Tirana in the 2017–18 and 2018–19 seasons.

== Career statistics ==
As of match played 12 May 2021

Club	Season	League			National Cup		League Cup		Europe		Total	
Club	Season	Division	Apps	Goals	Apps	Goals	Apps	Goals	Apps	Goals	Apps	Goals
Liverpool	2012–13	Premier League	0	0	0	0	0	0	0	0	0	0
Liverpool	2013–14	Premier League	0	0	0	0	0	0	—		0	0
Liverpool	Total		0	0	0	0	0	0	—		0	0
Heart of Midlothian (loan)	2012–13	Scottish Premier League	15	4	0	0	2	1	—		17	5
Yeovil Town (loan)	2013–14	Championship	6	0	0	0	1	0	—		7	0
Walsall (loan)	2013–14	League One	14	1	0	0	0	0	—		14	1
Kilmarnock	2014–15	Scottish Premiership	6	0	0	0	1	0	—		7	0
Bromley	2016–17	National League	1	0	0	0	0	0	—		1	0
Oldham Athletic	2016–17	League One	13	0	0	0	0	0	—		13	0
Tirana	2017–18	Albanian First Division	19	11	6	2	0	0	1	0	26	13
Tirana	2018–19	Albanian Superliga	22	4	8	6	—		—		30	10
Tirana	2019–20	Albanian Superliga	31	13	3	0	—		—		34	13
Tirana	Total		72	28	14	8	0	0	1	0	87	36
Enosis Neon Paralimni	2020–21	Cypriot First Division	16	0	0	0	0	0	0	0	16	0
Career totals			143	33	14	8	4	1	1	0	162	42

== Honours ==
Heart of Midlothian

- Scottish League Cup runner-up (1): 2012–2013

Tirana

- Albanian Superliga: 2019–20, 2021–22
- Albanian Supercup: 2017
- Albanian First Division: 2017–18
- Albanian Cup runner-up: 2018–19
