= Yunus Sentamu =

Ugandan footballer (born 1994)

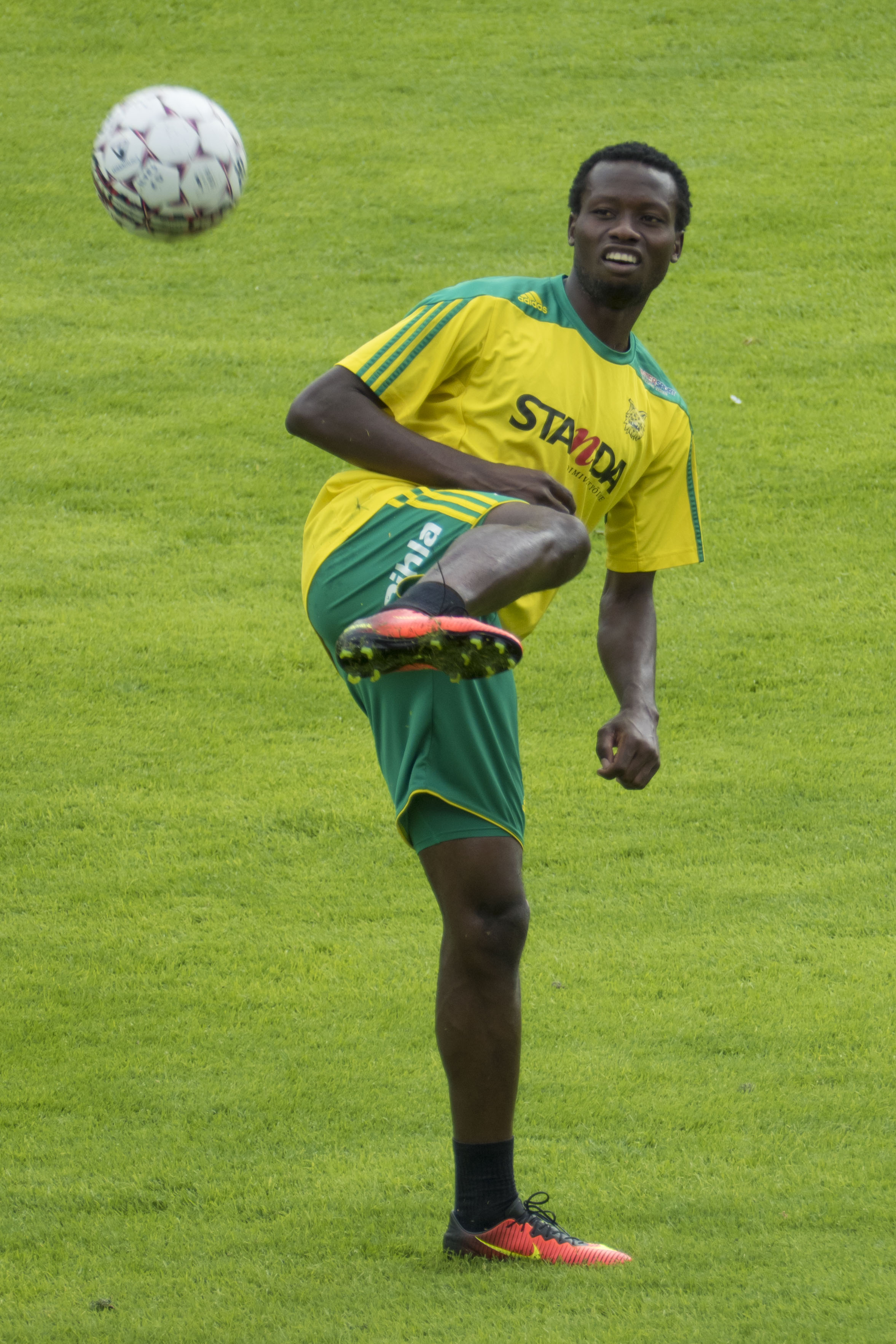
- Sentamu with Ilves in 2016

Personal information
- Full name: Yunus Sentamu
- Date of birth: 13 August 1994 (age 32)
- Place of birth: Kasese, Uganda
- Height: 1.78 m (5 ft 10 in)
- Position: Forward

Team information
- Current team: Vipers
- Number: 12

Senior career*
Years	Team	Apps	(Gls)
- Vipers
2013–2014	AS Vita Club		
2014–2015	CS Sfaxien	3	(0)
2016	Ilves	14	(1)
2017–2019	Tirana	43	(17)
2020–	Vipers	107	(45)

International career^{‡}
2014–	Uganda	32	(5)
- * Club domestic league appearances and goals as of 19 March 2025 ‡ National team caps and goals as of 17 November 2023

Yunus Sentamu (born 13 August 1994) is a Ugandan professional footballer who plays as a forward for Vipers SC in Uganda Premier League and the Uganda national team.

== Club career ==
=== AS Vita Club ===
In 2014, Sentamu represented Congolese club AS Vita Club in the CAF Champions League, helping his side to reach to the final of the competition.

=== Ilves ===
In July 2016, Sentamu was cleared to play for Ilves in the Finnish Veikkausliiga, following the resolution of visa problems, having originally signed an agreement in January 2016.

=== Tirana ===
On 19 June 2017, Sentamu completed a transfer to Tirana in the Albanian First Division. He made his debut in the first leg 2017–18 UEFA Europa League first qualifying round against Maccabi Tel Aviv as Tirana lost 2–0. He also played in the returning leg at Selman Stërmasi Stadium, receiving a red-card for a foul as Tirana lost 3–0, and was eliminated 5–0 on aggregate.

Sentamu captained Tirana for the first time on 25 November in the 1–1 draw against Shënkolli in the championship matchday 9. However, club's decision to make him captain for the match was heavily contested by fans. Manager Zé Maria defended his choice and also praised Sentamu, calling him "an example for everyone". He scored his first hat-trick of the season on 17 December in the 6–0 thrashing of Pogradeci valid for the matchday 11. In the last match of 2017, Sentamu won a penalty which was scored by Karabeci and himself netted the third in a 0–4 win at Naftëtari Kuçovë to become the first Tirana player to reach double-figures in the 2017–18 season.

Sentamu concluded his first season in Albania by scoring 12 goals in 19 league appearances as Tirana was crowned Albanian First Division champion after defeating Kastrioti Krujë on 16 May 2018.

Sentamu re-joined Vipers SC on 28 January 2021 and signed with the Kitende based Club for a period of two years. He was unveiled by Vipers SC coach Fred Kajoba at the St. Mary's Kitende for the 2020/21 Uganda Premier League.

== International career ==
Sentamu debuted for the Uganda national football team in 2014, and has since made over 30 appearances and scored five goals for his country.

== Career statistics ==
=== Club ===
As of 18 March 2025

Appearances and goals by club, season and competition
Club	Season	League			National cup (Note: Includes Albanian Cup)		Continental		Other		Total	
Club	Season	Division	Apps	Goals	Apps	Goals	Apps	Goals	Apps	Goals	Apps	Goals
AS Vita Club	2013–14	Linafoot					6 (Note: Appearances in CAF Champions League)	2	–		6	2
CS Sfaxien	2014–15	Tunisian Ligue 1	3	0	0	0	0	0	–		3	0
Ilves	2016	Veikkausliiga	14	1	0	0	–		–		14	1
Tirana	2017–18	Kategoria e Parë	20	12	5	1	2 (Note: Appearances in UEFA Europa League)	0	1 (Note: Appearance in Albanian Supercup)	0	28	13
Tirana	2018–19	Kategoria Superiore	23	5	4	5	–		–		27	10
Tirana	Total		43	17	9	6	2	0	1	0	55	23
Vipers SC	2020–21	Uganda Premier League	22	16	–		–		–		22	16
Vipers SC	2021–22	Uganda Premier League	25	14	–		–		–		25	14
Vipers SC	2022–23	Uganda Premier League	16	8	–		8	1	–		24	9
Vipers SC	2023–24	Uganda Premier League	26	3	–		2	2	–		28	5
Vipers SC	2024–25	Uganda Premier League	18	4	–		–		–		18	4
Vipers SC	Total		107	45	0	0	10	3	0	0	117	48
Career total			167	63	9	6	18	5	1	0	195	74

=== International ===
As of 17 November 2023

Uganda national team
Year	Apps	Goals
2014	10	4
2015	4	0
2016	2	0
2017	2	0
2018	4	0
2019	0	0
2020	0	0
2021	6	1
2022	3	0
2023	1	0
Total	32	5

=== International goals ===
As of 19 March 2025

#	Date	Venue	Opponent	Score	Result	Competition	Ref
1.	12 January 2014	Athlone Stadium, Cape Town, South Africa	Burkina Faso	1–0	3–0	2014 African Nations Championship	
2.	12 January 2014	Athlone Stadium, Cape Town, South Africa	Burkina Faso	2–0	3–0	2014 African Nations Championship	
3.	20 January 2014	Cape Town Stadium, Cape Town, South Africa	Morocco	1–1	1–3	2014 African Nations Championship	
4.	9 November 2014	Mandela National Stadium, Kampala, Uganda	Ethiopia	2–0	3–0	Friendly	
5.	29 August 2021	Bahir Dar Stadium, Bahir Dar, Ethiopia	Ethiopia	1–2	1–2	Friendly	

== Honours ==
AS Vita Club

- CAF Champions League runner-up: 2014

Tirana

- Albanian First Division: 2017–18
- Albanian Supercup: 2017

Individual

- Ugandan Player of the Year 2014
