= Niko Zisi =

Albanian footballer (born 1995)

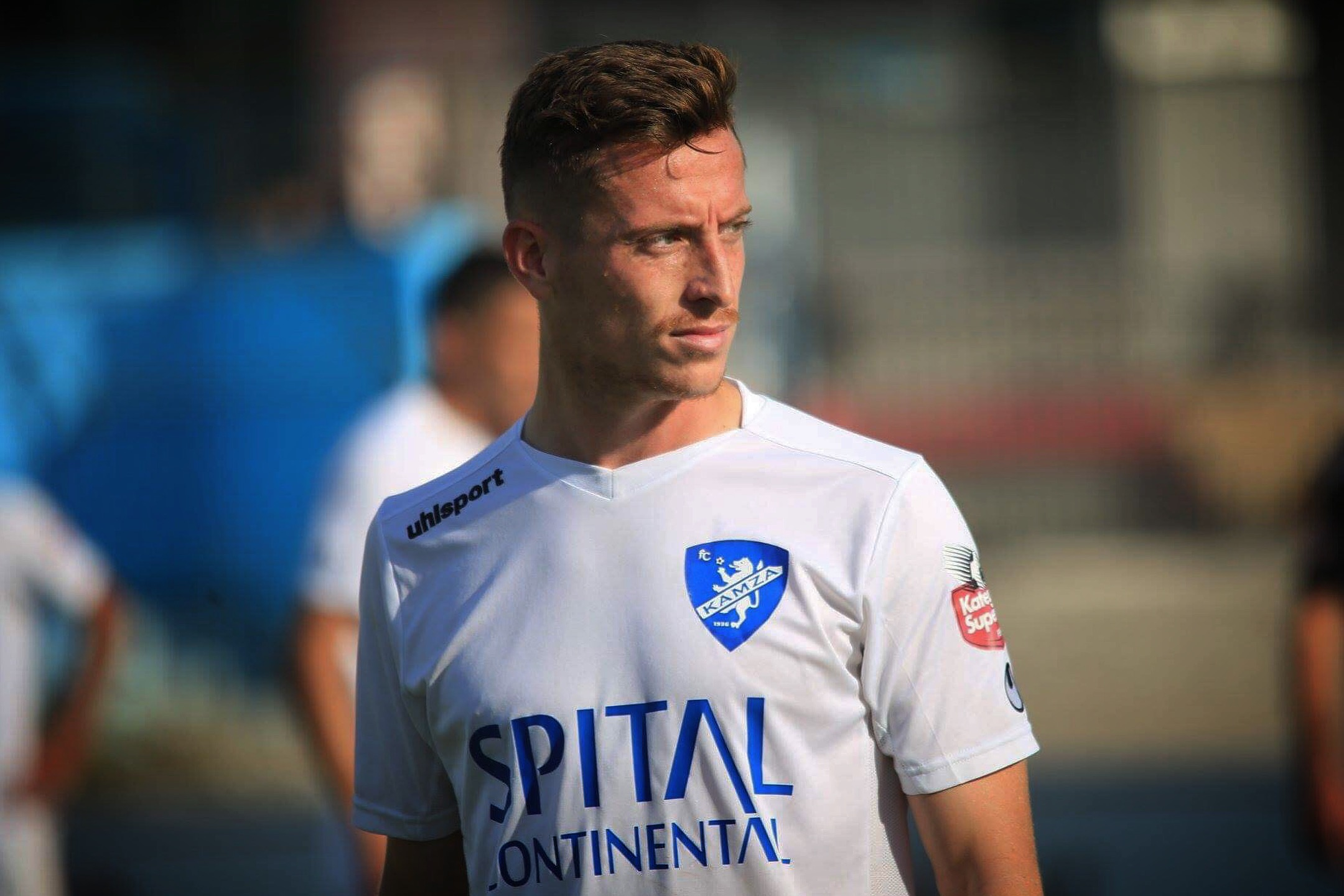

Personal information
- Date of birth: 24 August 1995 (age 31)
- Place of birth: Fier, Albania
- Height: 1.78 m (5 ft 10 in)
- Position: Attacking midfielder

Team information
- Current team: Lushnja

Youth career
- 2008–2013: Aris Thessaloniki
- 2013–2014: Pefki

Senior career*
Years	Team	Apps	(Gls)
2016–2017	Elbasani	10	(1)
2017–2018	Bylis Ballsh	23	(10)
2018–2019	Kamza	20	(0)
2020–2021	SV Donaustauf	4	(0)
2021	AS Santorinis	0	(0)
2022	AO Ypatou	0	(0)
2022–2023	Agrotikos Asteras	0	(0)
2023–2024	Lushnja	0	(0)
2024–	Apollon Paralimnio		
- * Club domestic league appearances and goals as of 1 August 2023

Niko Zisi (born 24 August 1995) is an Albanian professional footballer who plays as an attacking midfielder for Gamma Ethniki club Apollon Paralimnio.

== Career ==
=== Early career ===
Zisi spent much of his early career in Greece by playing notably with Aris youth teams. He returned in Albania in September 2014 to play for Dinamo Tirana. One year later, he returned again in Greece, this time to play for Achilleas Triandrias.

=== Elbasani ===
In January 2017, Zisi joined Albanian First Division side Bylis Ballsh and was sent on loan at fellow side Elbasani until the end of the season. He made his debut as professional footballer on 18 February by playing in the second half of the 1–3 home loss to Apolonia Fier.

His first score-sheet contributions came later on 21 April in the 2–2 draw against the same opponent, which brought Elbasani closer to relegation. Zisi finished the second half of 2016–17 season by making 10 league appearances, scoring once as Elbasani was relegated after losing the relegation final 2–0 against Sopoti Librazhd.

=== Bylis Ballsh ===
In June 2017, Zisi returned to the club and signed a one-year contract. He made his first appearance of the season on 13 September in the match against Tomori Berat won 0–3. He opened his scoring account on matchday 3 in the 3–1 home win over Shënkolli. Later on 4 November, Zisi made a Man of the Match performance by scoring the winner against away against Tirana, ending their undefeated streak and becoming the first player in 2017–18 season to score against them. Zisi concluded the 2017–18 by scoring 9 goals and giving 9 assists.

=== Kamza ===
On 13 August 2018, Kazma completed the signing of Zisi from Bylis Ballsh for a fee of €40,000. The player was presented three days later, signing a contract running until June 2021.

=== SV Donaustauf ===
After it was reported, that Zisi had joined Greek Super League Greece 2 club A.E. Karaiskakis in late-December 2019 - which, however, never officially was confirmed - Zisi moved to German Bayernliga Süd club SV Donaustauf in January 2020.

== Style of play ==
Zisi has been compared to Bernard Berisha by Bylis Ballsh fans due to their similar playing style and pace.

== Career statistics ==
As of 12 May 2018

Appearances and goals by club, season and competition
Club	Season	League			Cup		Continental		Total	
Club	Season	Division	Apps	Goals	Apps	Goals	Apps	Goals	Apps	Goals
Elbasani (loan)	2016–17	Albanian First Division	10	1	0	0	—		10	1
Bylis Ballsh	2017–18	Albanian First Division	23	9	0	0	—		23	9
Kamza	2018–19	Albanian Superliga	10	0	0	0	—		10	0
Career total			43	10	0	0	0	0	43	10
