= Bashkim Sulejmani Stadium =

Stadium in Kuçovë, Albania

- Interactive map of Bashkim Sulejmani Stadium
- Location: Kuçovë, Albania
- Coordinates: 40°48′7″N 19°54′34″E
- Owner: Municipality of Kuçovë, KF Naftëtari Kuçovë
- Operator: Naftëtari
- Capacity: 5,000

Tenant
- Naftëtari

The Bashkim Sulejmani Stadium is a multi-purpose stadium in Kuçovë, Albania. It is currently used mostly for football matches and is the home ground of Naftëtari. The stadium holds 5,000 spectators It is named after Bashkim Sulejmani, a hero of the city.
