= Orgest Buzi =

Albanian professional footballer

Personal information
- Date of birth: 20 September 1994 (age 32)
- Place of birth: Fier, Albania
- Height: 1.84 m (6 ft 0 in)
- Position: Defender

Team information
- Current team: Frisia Wilhelmshaven
- Number: 22

Senior career*
Years	Team	Apps	(Gls)
2012–2018	Bylis	29	(2)
2013–2014	→ Himara (loan)	10	(1)
2015–2016	→ Dinamo Tirana (loan)	18	(0)
2017	→ Sopoti (loan)	11	(0)
2018–2019	Apolonia	22	(0)
2019–2021	BV Essen	13	(1)
2021–2022	SV Thüle		
2022–	Frisia Wilhelmshaven	21	(1)
- * Club domestic league appearances and goals as of 29 May 2023

Orgest Buzi (born 20 September 1994) is an Albanian professional footballer who plays for an amateur German side Frisia Wilhelmshaven. While playing for Dinamo Tirana, he suffered a serious facial injury and required transporting to hospital in Tirana, however, there was not anyone available to transport him there at the time.
