= Ervis Çaço =

Albanian footballer

Personal information
- Date of birth: 26 April 1989 (age 37)
- Place of birth: Berat, Albania
- Height: 1.75 m (5 ft 9 in)
- Position: Midfielder

Team information
- Current team: Tomori
- Number: 77

Youth career
- Tomori Berat

Senior career*
Years	Team	Apps	(Gls)
2007–2011	Tomori	15+	(1+)
2011–2013	Luftëtari	49	(5)
2013	Tirana	1	(0)
2014	Tomori	13	(3)
2014–2016	Luftëtari	38	(4)
2016–2018	Tomori	50	(8)
2019	Besa	10	(0)
2019–2021	Korabi	28	(0)
2021–	Tomori	99	(8)
- * Club domestic league appearances and goals as of 1 June 2024

Ervis Çaço (born 26 April 1989 in Berat) is an Albanian footballer who currently for KF Tomori Berat in the Albanian First Division.
