= Kenneth Muguna =

Kenyan footballer (born 1996)

Kenneth Mugambi Muguna
Personal information
- Date of birth: 6 January 1996 (age 30)
- Place of birth: Meru, Kenya
- Height: 1.75 m (5 ft 9 in)
- Position: Midfielder

Team information
- Current team: Kenya Police

Youth career
- 2007–2015: Western Stima

Senior career*
Years	Team	Apps	(Gls)
2016–2017	Gor Mahia	30	(9)
2018	Tirana	6	(0)
2018–2021	Gor Mahia		
2021–2023	Azam		
2023–	Kenya Police		

International career^{‡}
2017–	Kenya	7	(1)
- * Club domestic league appearances and goals as of 23 December 2017 ‡ National team caps and goals as of 9 September 2019

Kenneth Muguna (born 6 January 1996) is a Kenyan professional footballer who plays as a midfielder for Kenya Police and the Kenya national team.

== International career ==
=== International goals ===
Scores and results list Kenya's goal tally first.

No.	Date	Venue	Opponent	Score	Result	Competition
1.	8 September 2019	Moi International Sports Centre, Nairobi, Kenya	Uganda	1–1	1–1	Friendly
2.	19 December 2019	Lugogo Stadium, Kampala, Uganda	Tanzania	2–0	2–1	2019 CECAFA Cup

== Honours ==
=== Club ===
Tirana

- Albanian First Division : Winner Group B
- Albanian First Division : 2017-2018

Gor mahia Kenya premier league 2019
