= 2017 Albanian Supercup =

Kukësi	KF Tirana
0	1
- Date: 6 September 2017
- Venue: Selman Stërmasi Stadium, Tirana
- Referee: Juxhin Xhaja
- Attendance: 1,800
- Weather: Clear; 28 °C (82 °F)

The 2017 Albanian Supercup was the 24th edition of the Albanian Supercup, an annual Albanian football match. The teams were decided by taking the winner of the previous season's Albanian Superliga and the winner of the Albanian Cup.

The match was contested by Kukësi, champions of the 2016–17 Albanian Superliga, and Tirana, the 2016–17 Albanian Cup winners. The match was held at Selman Stërmasi Stadium in Tirana for the second consecutive year. and Tirana won the game 1–0. Tirana also set a record by becoming the first Albanian First Division side to win the Supercup. The game was broadcast through DigitAlb's SuperSport Albania.

== Details ==
6 September 2017
19:00 CET

Kukësi	0–1	Tirana
	Report	Hoxhallari 90'

Selman Stërmasi Stadium, Tirana
Attendance: 1,800
Referee: Juxhin Xhaja

Kukësi	Tirana

GK	1	(Albania) Enea Koliçi
DF	20	(Albania) Simon Rrumbullaku
DF	5	(Albania) Rustem Hoxha
DF	4	(Albania) Ylli Shameti	(yellow card) 26' (yellow-red card) 29'
DF	13	(Albania) Rrahman Hallaçi (c)
MF	23	(Kosovo) Besar Musolli
MF	17	(Albania) Hair Zeqiri
MF	10	(Albania) Ndriçim Shtubina
MF	99	(Albania) Elis Bakaj	(yellow card) 65'
FW	9	(Albania) Sindrit Guri
FW	14	(Azerbaijan) Rauf Aliyev	(substituted off) 46'
Substitutes:
GK	12	(Albania) Ervis Koçi
DF	8	(Kosovo) Bujar Idrizi
DF	19	(Albania) Eni Imami
MF	61	(Montenegro) Miloš Krkotić	(substituted on) 46'
MF	16	(Albania) Kristi Joti
MF	97	(Albania) Albi Koldashi
FW	27	(Albania) Valon Ethemi
Manager:
(Serbia) Mladen Milinković

GK	1	(Albania) Ilion Lika
DF	18	(Albania) Dorian Kërçiku	(yellow card) 58'
DF	5	(Albania) Marvin Turtulli	(yellow card) 60' (yellow-red card) 90+2'
DF	28	(Albania) Erion Hoxhallari	(yellow card) 42'
MF	13	(Albania) Erando Karabeci (c)
MF	14	(Albania) Asion Daja	(substituted off) 81'
MF	15	(Albania) Bedri Greca	(substituted off) 71'
MF	16	(Albania) Alked Çelhaka	(yellow card) 26' (substituted off) 59'
MF	7	(Uganda) Tony Mawejje
MF	8	(Brazil) Wellyson
FW	10	(Uganda) Yunus Sentamu
Substitutes:
GK	97	(Albania) Ditmar Shehri
DF	2	(Albania) Marlind Nuriu
DF	17	(Albania) Albi Doka	(substituted on) 59'
DF	3	(Albania) Alvaro Bishaj
MF	6	(Albania) Mateus Levendi
FW	9	(Albania) Grent Halili	(substituted on) 81'
FW	45	(England) Michael Ngoo	(substituted on) 71'
Manager:
(Brazil) Zé Maria

Match officials:

- Assistant referees:
  - Ilir Tartari
  - Dojando Myftari
- Fourth official: Kreshnik Cjapi (Albania)

Match rules

- 90 minutes
- 30 minutes extra-time if the scores still level
- Penalty shoot-out if scores still level
- Six named substitutes, of which three may be used

== See also ==
- 2016–17 Albanian Superliga
- 2016–17 Albanian Cup
