= 2016–17 Kategoria e Dytë =

Kategoria e Dytë
- Season: 2016–17

The 2016–17 Kategoria e Dytë is being competed between 26 teams in 2 groups, A and B, respectively.

== Changes from last season ==
=== Team changes ===
==== From Kategoria e Dytë ====
Promoted to Kategoria e Parë:

- Shënkolli
- Tomori

==== To Kategoria e Dytë ====
Relegated from Kategoria e Parë:

- Ada
- Butrinti

Promoted from Kategoria e Tretë:

- Kukësi B
- Vllaznia B

== Participating teams ==
Group A

| Team | Location | Stadium | Capacity |
|---|---|---|---|
| Albpetrol | Patos | Alush Noga Stadium | 4,000 |
| Luzi 2008 | Luz i Vogël | Luz i Vogël Stadium | 600 |
| Vora | Vorë | Vorë Sports Field | 1,000 |
| Tirana B | Tirana | National Sports Centre | 50 |
| Partizani B | Tirana | Olimpiku Stadium | 1,500 |
| Vllaznia B | Shkodër | Reshit Rusi Stadium | 1,200 |
| Veleçiku | Koplik | Kompleksi Vellezërit Duli | 2,000 |
| Gramshi | Gramsh | Mislim Koçi Stadium | 1,500 |
| Internacional Tirana | Tirana | Internacional Complex | 1,000 |
| Ada | Velipojë | Adriatik Velipojë | 1,200 |
| Kukësi B | Kukës | Zeqir Ymeri Stadium | 5,000 |
| Kevitan | Tirana | Kevitan Complex | 500 |
| Egnatia | Rrogozhinë | Rrogozhinë Stadium | 4,000 |

Group B

| Team | Location | Stadium | Capacity |
|---|---|---|---|
| Naftëtari | Kuçovë | Bashkim Sulejmani Stadium | 5,000 |
| Oriku | Orikum | Petro Ruci Stadium | 2,000 |
| Delvina | Delvinë | Panajot Pano Stadium | 2,500 |
| Devolli | Bilisht | Bilisht Stadium | 1,050 |
| Këlcyra | Këlcyrë | Fusha Sportive Këlcyrë | 1,000 |
| Butrinti | Sarandë | Butrinti Stadium | 5,000 |
| Maliqi | Maliq | Fusha Sportive Maliq | 400 |
| Memaliaj | Memaliaj | Karafil Caushi Stadium | 1,500 |
| Domozdova | Prrenjas | Stadiumi Domozdova | 1,000 |
| Përmeti | Përmet | Durim Qypi Stadium | 4,000 |
| Tepelena | Tepelenë | Sabaudin Shehu Stadium | 10,000 |
| Skrapari | Çorovodë | Skrapar Sports Field | 1,500 |
| Gramozi | Ersekë | Ersekë Stadium | 6,000 |

== League tables ==
=== Group A ===
| Pos | Team | Pld | W | D | L | GF | GA | GD | Pts | Promotion or relegation |
|---|---|---|---|---|---|---|---|---|---|---|
| 1 | Egnatia (C, P) | 24 | 22 | 1 | 1 | 45 | 10 | +35 | 67 | Promotion to 2017–18 Kategoria e Parë |
| 2 | Vllaznia B (P) | 24 | 17 | 2 | 5 | 53 | 24 | +29 | 53 | Play-off promotion to 2017–18 Kategoria e Parë |
| 3 | Vora | 24 | 14 | 3 | 7 | 56 | 33 | +23 | 45 | |
| 4 | Partizani B | 24 | 12 | 6 | 6 | 41 | 28 | +13 | 42 | |
| 5 | Albpetrol | 24 | 11 | 7 | 6 | 31 | 25 | +6 | 40 | |
| 6 | Gramshi | 24 | 9 | 4 | 11 | 35 | 36 | −1 | 31 | |
| 7 | Tirana B | 24 | 8 | 7 | 9 | 38 | 44 | −6 | 31 | |
| 8 | Kukësi B | 24 | 9 | 6 | 9 | 41 | 36 | +5 | 30 (Note: Kukësi B and Kevitan were deducted three points.) | |
| 9 | Luzi 2008 | 24 | 6 | 8 | 10 | 22 | 25 | −3 | 26 | |
| 10 | Veleçiku | 24 | 7 | 2 | 15 | 23 | 34 | −11 | 23 | |
| 11 | Internacional Tirana | 24 | 5 | 5 | 14 | 18 | 40 | −22 | 20 | |
| 12 | Ada | 24 | 5 | 3 | 16 | 32 | 61 | −29 | 18 | |
| 13 | Kevitan | 24 | 1 | 6 | 17 | 16 | 55 | −39 | 6 | |

Source: Soccerway
Rules for classification: 1) points; 2) goal difference; 3) number of goals scored; 4) head-to-head points; 5) head-to-head goal difference; 6) draw. (Head-to-head record is applied for clubs with the same number of points only once all matches between said clubs have been played.)
(C) Champions; (P) Promoted

=== Group B ===
| Pos | Team | Pld | W | D | L | GF | GA | GD | Pts | Promotion or relegation |
|---|---|---|---|---|---|---|---|---|---|---|
| 1 | Naftëtari (P) | 24 | 20 | 4 | 0 | 58 | 14 | +44 | 64 | Promotion to 2017–18 Kategoria e Parë |
| 2 | Oriku | 24 | 16 | 6 | 2 | 52 | 16 | +36 | 54 | Play-off promotion to 2017–18 Kategoria e Parë |
| 3 | Maliqi | 24 | 12 | 1 | 11 | 39 | 36 | +3 | 37 | |
| 4 | Domozdova | 24 | 11 | 3 | 10 | 41 | 42 | −1 | 36 | |
| 5 | Butrinti | 24 | 10 | 5 | 9 | 35 | 30 | +5 | 35 | |
| 6 | Devolli | 24 | 10 | 2 | 12 | 40 | 40 | 0 | 32 | |
| 7 | Memaliaj | 24 | 8 | 6 | 10 | 32 | 40 | −8 | 30 | |
| 8 | Tepelena | 24 | 9 | 3 | 12 | 25 | 34 | −9 | 30 | |
| 9 | Përmeti | 24 | 8 | 3 | 13 | 28 | 34 | −6 | 27 | |
| 10 | Këlcyra | 24 | 9 | 3 | 12 | 39 | 50 | −11 | 27 (Note: Këlcyra were deducted three points.) | |
| 11 | Delvina | 24 | 7 | 4 | 13 | 30 | 39 | −9 | 25 | |
| 12 | Gramozi | 24 | 7 | 2 | 15 | 24 | 38 | −14 | 23 | |
| 13 | Skrapari | 24 | 7 | 2 | 15 | 29 | 59 | −30 | 23 | |

Source: Soccerway
Rules for classification: 1) points; 2) goal difference; 3) number of goals scored; 4) head-to-head points; 5) head-to-head goal difference; 6) draw. (Head-to-head record is applied for clubs with the same number of points only once all matches between said clubs have been played.)
(P) Promoted

== Final ==
17 May 2017
16:00

| Egnatia | 4−1 | Naftëtari |

Niko Dovana Stadium, Durrës
