= Zé Maria (footballer, born 1973) =

Brazilian football manager and former player

Personal information
- Full name: José Marcelo Ferreira
- Date of birth: 25 July 1973 (age 53)
- Place of birth: Oeiras (PI - Brazil)
- Height: 1.74 m (5 ft 9 in)
- Positions: Right back; right midfielder

Senior career*
Years	Team	Apps	(Gls)
1991–1995	Portuguesa	28	(2)
1993	→ Sergipe (loan)	38	(5)
1994	→ Ponte Preta (loan)	22	(0)
1996	Flamengo	14	(1)
1996–1998	Parma	45	(2)
1998–2004	Perugia	144	(16)
1999	→ Vasco Gama (loan)	34	(4)
1999	→ Palmeiras (loan)	15	(1)
2000	→ Cruzeiro (loan)	29	(2)
2004–2006	Inter Milan	29	(1)
2006–2007	Levante	14	(0)
2008	Portuguesa	5	(1)
2008–2009	Città Castello		
Total		416	(35)

International career
1996–2001	Brazil	25	(0)

Managerial career
- 2010: Group Castello
- 2010: Catanzaro
- 2015: Ceahlăul
- 2016–2017: Gor Mahia
- 2017–2018: Tirana
- 2019: Portuguesa
- 2024–2025: Olbia
Medal record
Representing Brazil
Men's Olympic Games
Bronze medal – third place	1996 Atlanta	Team competition
- * Club domestic league appearances and goals

José Marcelo Ferreira (born 25 July 1973), commonly known as Zé Maria, is a retired Brazilian football player turned coach.

Known for his pin-point crosses, he could play either as a right back or right midfielder, and played the vast majority of his professional career, other than in his country, in Italy's Serie A, where he represented three teams, mainly Perugia.

== Club career ==
Born in Oeiras, Piauí, Zé Maria began his professional career with Portuguesa in 1991, being loaned out twice during his contract with the club. In 1995, he was selected in the Bola de Prata Brazilian League team of the year. This led to him being signed by Flamengo in 1996.

In the summer, Zé Maria moved to Italy after signing with Serie A club Parma, playing regularly for two seasons. Subsequently, he remained in Italy, joining Perugia.

With the Umbrians Zé Maria had a shaky start, being loaned three times back to Brazil, during which time he won the Copa Libertadores with Palmeiras, and the Copa do Brasil with Cruzeiro. Eventually, he established himself in the Perugia starting line-up, helping his team finish 10th in his third full season whilst contributing with six goals. Via the UEFA Intertoto Cup he and the side reached the third round of the subsequent UEFA Cup, but also suffered domestic relegation.

After two seasons with giants Inter – playing instead regularly in his first but making only eight appearances (mostly as a substitute) in his second (with Inter winning the Scudetto courtesy of the Calciopoli affair), 49 official ones overall – Zé Maria was released and joined La Liga club Levante UD on a free transfer: starting the season as first-choice right-back the 33-year-old lost the position and finished with 14 league appearances, with the Valencians barely avoiding relegation.

Released again, Zé Maria entailed unsuccessful negotiations with several teams, reportedly Sheffield United and Queens Park Rangers in England, thus returning to Brazil and Portuguesa in January 2008. In August, after having rescinded his contract, he surprisingly accepted an offer from A.S.D. Città di Castello, in the Italian Eccellenza (amateur championships).

Zé Maria settled in Italy after his retirement from football, at the age of 36. He subsequently founded a football school in Perugia.

== International career ==
Zé Maria gained 25 caps for Brazil over a period of five years. He was not selected for any FIFA World Cup but did participate in two FIFA Confederations Cups, including the original in Saudi Arabia which the national team won, and one Copa América (also ended in win, in Bolivia).

In 1996 Zé Maria helped the Olympic team win bronze at the 1996 Summer Olympics in Atlanta, appearing in all six matches.

== Managerial career ==
=== Beginnings ===
On 15 March 2010, Zé Maria took his first head coaching job, accepting Serie D club S.S.D. Group Città di Castello's offer. He was then appointed manager of fourth division team F.C. Catanzaro for the 2010–11 campaign, being however removed from his post after a few months.

=== Tirana ===
On 16 June 2017, Tirana announced the signing of Zé Maria on a one-year contract. He lost his first match in charge later on 29 June, a 2–0 away loss to Maccabi Tel Aviv at Netanya Stadium in the 2017–18 UEFA Europa League first qualifying round. Tirana was knocked out from the competition after losing the second leg.

Zé Maria won his first silverware with the club later on 6 September, the 2017 Albanian Supercup, with Tirana defeating Kukësi thanks to an Erion Hoxhallari late winner. By doing so, Tirana became the first ever Albanian First Division club to win the supercup. Tirana began the championship by recording a 1–0 home win versus Iliria Fushë-Krujë. They successfully eliminated Besa Kavajë 4–1 on aggregate in the 2017–18 Albanian Cup first round. Tirana ended September by winning all the matches, and did so also in November, taking the lead of Group B. During his time, Zé Maria also guided Tirana to the biggest win of the season, 6–0 versus Shkumbini Peqin.

Tirana finished the year in the first place, conceding only one defeat, the one versus Bylis Ballsh. Zé Maria called the defeat "a shame". The team also eliminated Vllaznia Shkodër in the second round of Albanian Cup. In January 2018, Tirana brought Kenneth Muguna, Mohammed Musa and Samson Iliasu at the request of Zé Maria. In February 2018, Tirana was eliminated by Kukësi in the quarter-final of the Albanian Cup.

Tirana continued their winning streak, eventually finishing top of Group B to qualify for the promotion play-off. Later on 14 April, the team mathematically achieved promotion to top flight next season by winning 3–2 at home against Pogradeci. On 16 May, Tirana was named Albanian First Division champions after beating 2–0 the Group A winners Kastrioti Krujë. Later on 2 June, Zé Maria agreed a contract extension with the club until June 2020.

=== Later years ===
On 5 October 2022, Parma announced to have hired Zé Maria as a technical collaborator for the youth team.

He departed from Parma in November 2024 to become the new head coach of Serie D club Olbia. He left the club by the end of the season.

=== Managerial record ===
As of 17 June 2017

Team	From	To	Record				
Team	From	To	G	W	D	L	Win %
Gor Mahia F.C.	Jan 2016	Jun 2017					

Team	From	To	Record				
Team	From	To	G	W	D	L	Win %
Tirana	17 June 2017	12 October 2018	46	30	7	9	65.22

== Honours ==
=== Player ===
Flamengo

- Campeonato Carioca: 1996

Palmeiras

- Copa Libertadores: 1999

Cruzeiro

- Copa do Brasil: 2000

Perugia

- UEFA Intertoto Cup: 2003

Inter Milan

- Serie A: 2005–06
- Coppa Italia: 2004–05, 2005–06

Brazil

- Copa América: 1997
- FIFA Confederations Cup: 1997
- 1996 Summer Olympics: Bronze Medalist

=== Managerial ===
Tirana

- Albanian Supercup: 2017
- Albanian First Division: 2017–18
