= 2018–19 KF Tirana season =

KF Tirana
2018–19 season
- President: Refik Halili
- Head coach: Zé Maria (until 11 October 2018); Ardian Mema (from 12 October 2018)
- Stadium: Selman Stërmasi Stadium
- Kategoria Superiore: 7th
- Albanian Cup: Runners-up
- Top goalscorer: League: Edon Hasani (12); All: Michael Ngoo (16)
- Highest home attendance: 8,000 vs Partizani Tirana (1 March 2019)
- Lowest home attendance: 200 vs Iliria Fushë-Krujë (25 September 2018)
Home colours	Away colours	Third colours

The 2018–19 season is Klubi i Futbollit Tirana's 80th competitive season, 78th in the Kategoria Superiore and 98th year in existence as a football club.

== Season overview ==
=== June ===
On 1 June 2018, Tirana announced to have signed a new two-year contract with manager Zé Maria, making him the highest paid coach in Albania. The defender Erion Hoxhallari agreed a new contract until June 2020 despite interest from several European clubs. Then he was sent on loan at fellow Superliga side Laçi on a short-term contract only for their UEFA Europa League campaign.

On 14 June, Tirana reached a principal agreement with striker Michael Ngoo for the contract renewal. The club announced their first summer transfer nine days later, the Macedonian striker Dejan Blazhevski, who signed a 1+1 contract.

On 29 June, the youngster Ernest Muçi signed his first professional contract that would link him with Tirana for the next three years. The club also presented their second signing of summer transfer window, the midfielder Eni Imami who signed for the next two seasons.

=== July ===
Tirana begun the month by completing the signing of Vincent Atinga on a contract until June 2021. Youngsters Jurgen Çelhaka and Marsel Ismailgeci both signed three-year contracts, their firsts as professionals. The club then announced the next signing, the Ghanaian midfielder Winful Cobbinah, who signed a three-year deal.

The club did not offer a new deal the youngster Patrik Bardhi who left as a free agent and later signed for Kastrioti Krujë. After one season, Alked Çelhaka left the club by terminating the contract by mutual consent.

On 16 July, Asion Daja and Dorian Kërçiku both signed contracts for the new season. On 23 July, Tirana beat the concurrence of their rivals Partizani and signed the midfielder Edon Hasani on a two-year contract. The next days, Tirana announced that they were going to play friendly matches with Apolonia Fier, Flamurtari Pristina and Prishtina.

In the first friendly, Tirana recorded a 2–0 win at Selman Stërmasi Stadium against Apolonia Fier with the goal coming from newcomers Dejan Blazhevski and Edon Hasani. On 27 July, Sedat Berisha was unveiled as Tirana's newest player by signing a one-year contract with an option to renew. In the second one, Tirana won again, this time 3–0 versus Flamurtari Pristina.

=== August ===
Club vice-captain Gentian Muça returned in training after more than a year after healing from the Spinal disc herniation and a neck tumor which he discovered in July of the previous year. In the third and final friendly against Prishtina, Tirana suffered the first loss, as the Football Superleague of Kosovo side won 3–1 with Albi Doka scoring the consolation goal for the team.

On 14 August, Tirana acquired the services of goalkeeper Shpëtim Moçka as a free agent. Moçka, who previously played for Teuta Durrës, signed a contract running until the end of the 2018–19 season. Tirana commenced the Kategoria Superiore season four days later by playing against Kamza at home; the team surprisingly lost via a Sebino Plaku late winner. The following week, Tirana didn't go more than a goalless draw against Teuta Durrës, earning their first championship point.

Players such as Rei Qilimi, Alvaro Bishaj, Jurgen Vrapi, Hardy Binguila and Kenneth Muguna were all released by the club.

On 29 August, Tirana was drawn in the first round of the 2018–19 Albanian Cup against Iliria Fushë-Krujë.

On 31 August 2018, Nnamdi Oduamadi joined the club on a two-year contract.

=== September ===
Tirana begun the new month by playing in the third league match against Kukësi at Loro Boriçi Stadium; youngster Ernest Muçi scored the consolation goal for the team which was defeated 3–1. Two goals from Cobbinah and one each from Blazhevski and Turtulli secured a 4–1 victory in the first leg of the Albanian Cup, first round, over Iliria Fushë-Krujë.

Back in league, Tirana won their first championship match on 16 September by defeating Luftëtari Gjirokastër 3–1 at home; Blazhevski, Turtulli and Greca gave Tirana their first top-flight win after 484 days. The team then played Skënderbeu Korçë away in the matchday 5; despite opening the score with a header from Edon Hasani, the team conceded in the last minutes in a match which was marred by referee's mistakes.

On 25 September, Tirana won comfortably the second leg of Albanian Cup first round against Iliria Fushë-Krujë; Sentamu scored a hat-trick which was followed by Ngoo's goal. The team will play Flamurtari Vlorë in the second round.

Three days later, Tirana played their first derby match against Partizani Tirana after more than a year; the team lost again, making it 14 consecutive matches without winning. The loss also meant the team's worst Kategoria Superiore start since 2007–08 season.

=== October ===
Tirana's October begun with a 3–2 win at Kastrioti Krujë for the second win of the season. A brace by Blazhevski and an owngoal from Stijepović sealed the victory for the white&blues. It was Tirana's first away win in Kategoria Superiore since February 2016.

In the next league match, Tirana fell at the hands of Laçi; the guests won 1–0 at Selman Stërmasi Stadium thanks to a goal of Redon Xhixha while Blazhevski missed a crucial penalty in the last minutes. Following the match, striker Nnamdi Oduamadi was sent to hospital with a broken rib due to heavy challenges from Laçi players.

== Players ==
=== Squad information ===
As of 28 September 2018

Squad no.	Name	Nationality	Position	Date of birth (age)
Goalkeepers
1	Ilion Lika	(Albania)	GK	17 May 1980 (aged 38)
81	Alessio Abibi	(Albania)	GK	4 December 1996 (aged 21)
89	Shpëtim Moçka	(Albania)	GK	20 October 1989 (aged 28)
Defenders
2	Marsel Ismailgeci	(Albania)	LB	14 March 2000 (aged 18)
3	Klisman Cake	(Albania)	CB	2 May 1999 (aged 19)
4	Gentian Muça	(Albania)	CB / DM	13 May 1987 (aged 31)
5	Marvin Turtulli	(Albania)	CB	17 October 1994 (aged 23)
17	Albi Doka	(Albania)	RB	26 June 1997 (aged 21)
28	Erion Hoxhallari	(Albania)	LB	26 February 1993 (aged 25)
21	Vincent Atinga	(Ghana)	CB	30 October 1993 (aged 24)
23	Sedat Berisha	(North Macedonia)	CB	3 September 1989 (aged 28)
Midfielders
6	Tony Mawejje	(Uganda)	DM	15 December 1990 (aged 27)
7	Bedri Greca	(Albania)	CM	23 October 1990 (aged 27)
8	Winful Cobbinah	(Ghana)	AM	6 September 1991 (aged 26)
13	Erando Karabeci	(Albania)	CM / DM / AM	6 September 1988 (aged 29)
14	Asion Daja	(Albania)	CM / RB	14 March 1990 (aged 28)
16	Edon Hasani	(Albania)	CM / DM / AM	9 January 1992 (aged 26)
18	Dorian Kërçiku	(Albania)	CM / RB / LB	30 July 1993 (aged 24)
19	Eni Imami	(Albania)	CM / LM / CB / LB	19 December 1992 (aged 25)
Forwards
9	Grend Halili	(Albania)	CF	24 May 1998 (aged 20)
10	Nnamdi Oduamadi	(Nigeria)	CF	17 October 1990 (aged 27)
11	Yunus Sentamu	(Uganda)	CF	13 August 1994 (aged 23)
45	Michael Ngoo	(England)	CF	23 October 1992 (aged 25)
77	Dejan Blazhevski	(North Macedonia)	CF	6 December 1985 (aged 32)

==== From youth squad ====
Note: Flags indicate national team as defined under FIFA eligibility rules; some limited exceptions apply. Players may hold more than one non-FIFA nationality.

No.	Pos.	Nation	Player
15	MF	ALB	Jurgen Çelhaka
20	MF	ALB	Ernest Muçi

No.	Pos.	Nation	Player
22	MF	ALB	Jurgen Vrapi
25	MF	ALB	Andri Stafa

== Transfers ==
=== Transfers in ===
Date	Pos.	Nationality	Player	Age	Moving from	Fee	Ref
23 June 2018	FW	(North Macedonia)	Dejan Blazhevski	31	Vardar	Free	
29 June 2018	MF	(Albania)	Eni Imami	24	Free agent	Free	
1 July 2018	DF	(Ghana)	Vincent Atinga	23	Free agent	Free	
4 July 2018	MF	(Albania)	Jurgen Çelhaka	16	Youth team	Free	
4 July 2018	DF	(Albania)	Marsel Ismailgeci	17	Youth team	Free	
13 July 2018	MF	(Ghana)	Winful Cobbinah	25	Free agent	Free	
23 July 2018	MF	(Albania)	Edon Hasani	25	Free agent	Free	
27 July 2018	DF	(North Macedonia)	Sedat Berisha	27	Free agent	Free	
14 August 2018	GK	(Albania)	Shpëtim Moçka	28	Free agent	Free	
31 August 2018	FW	(Nigeria)	Nnamdi Oduamadi	27	Free agent	Free	

=== Transfers out ===
Date	Pos.	Nationality	Player	Age	Moving to	Fee	Ref
8 July 2018	MF	(Albania)	Alked Çelhaka	23	Free agent	Free	
1 August 2018	MF	(Albania)	Rei Qilimi	22	Free agent	Free	
1 August 2018	DF	(Albania)	Alvaro Bishaj	26	Free agent	Free	
9 August 2018	FW	(Albania)	Patrik Bardhi	20	Kastrioti Krujë (Note: Following Bardhi's departure he joined Kastrioti Krujë.)	Free	
19 August 2018	MF	(Kenya)	Kenneth Muguna	22	Gor Mahia	Free	
29 August 2018	MF	(Albania)	Jurgen Vrapi	19	Dinamo Tirana	Free	

=== Loans out ===
Start date	Pos.	Nationality	Name	To	End date	Ref.
14 June 2018	LB	(Albania)	Erion Hoxhallari	(Albania) Laçi	3 August 2018	

== Pre-season and friendlies ==
25 July 2018 Friendly	Tirana (Albania)	2–0	(Albania) Apolonia Fier	Tirana, Albania
17:00 CET	Blazhevski; Hasani			Stadium: Selman Stërmasi Stadium

29 July 2018 Friendly	Tirana (Albania)	3–0	(Kosovo) Flamurtari Pristina	Tirana, Albania
17:00 CET	Sentamu 55'; Cobbinah 67'; Turtulli 85'	Report		Stadium: Selman Stërmasi Stadium; Referee: Klajdi Kola (Albania)

5 August 2018 Friendly	Tirana (Albania)	1–3	(Kosovo) Prishtina	Tirana, Albania
17:00 CET	Doka 49'	Report	Korenica 10' (pen.), 20', 25'	Stadium: Selman Stërmasi Stadium

9 January 2019 Friendly	Tirana (Albania)	1–2	(Albania) Skënderbeu Korçë	Tirana, Albania
14:00 CET	Muçi 14'	Report	Hoxhaj 66'; Otto John 81'	Stadium: Skënder Halili Complex

12 January 2019 Friendly	Tirana (Albania)	0–2	(Albania) Laçi	Tirana, Albania
14:00 CET		Report	Xhixha 6'; Mersinaj 19'	Stadium: Skënder Halili Complex

16 January 2019 Friendly	Tirana (Albania)	3–1	(Albania) Besa Kavajë	Tirana, Albania
14:00 CET	Muçi 65', 85'; Doka 87'	Report	Onuh 60'	Stadium: Skënder Halili Complex

== Competitions ==
Competition	First match	Last match	Starting round	Final position	Record							
Competition	First match	Last match	Starting round	Final position	Pld	W	D	L	GF	GA	GD	Win %
Kategoria Superiore	18 August 2018	30 May 2019	Matchday 1	7th	36	12	11	13	44	35	+9	33.33
Albanian Cup	12 September 2018	2 June 2019	First round	Runners-up	9	5	1	3	19	9	+10	55.56
Total					45	17	12	16	63	44	+19	37.78

Last updated: 2 June 2019
Source: Soccerway

=== Kategoria Superiore ===
==== League table ====
Pos	Team	Pld	W	D	L	GF	GA	GD	Pts	Qualification or relegation
5	Flamurtari (Note: Flamurtari failed to obtain a UEFA license.)	36	15	9	12	35	32	+3	54	
6	Laçi	36	12	13	11	33	30	+3	49	Qualification for the Europa League first qualifying round (Note: Since the winners of the 2018–19 Albanian Cup, Kukësi, qualified for European competition based on league position, the spot awarded to the cup winners was passed down to the sixth-placed team, Laçi, since the fourth-placed team and the fifth-placed team failed to obtain a UEFA license.)
7	Tirana	36	12	11	13	44	35	+9	47	
8	Luftëtari	36	13	8	15	37	39	−2	47	
9	Kastrioti (R)	36	12	6	18	35	53	−18	42	Relegation to the 2019–20 Kategoria e Parë

Source: Albanian Football Association, Soccerway
Rules for classification: 1) Points; 2) Head-to-head points; 3) Head-to-head goal difference; 4) Head-to-head goals scored; 5) Goal difference; 6) Goals scored; 7) Draw.
(R) Relegated

==== Results summary ====
Overall								Home						Away					
Pld	W	D	L	GF	GA	GD	Pts	W	D	L	GF	GA	GD	W	D	L	GF	GA	GD
32	10	10	12	37	32	+5	40	5	7	4	17	11	+6	5	3	8	20	21	−1

Last updated: 30 May 2019.
Source: Competitive matches

==== Results by round ====
Round	1	2	3	4	5	6	7	8	9	10	11	12	13	14	15	16	17	18	19	20	21	22	23	24	25	26	27	28	29	30	31	32	33	34	35	36
Ground	H	H	A	H	A	H	A	H	A	A	A	H	A	H	A	H	A	H	H	H	A	H	A	H	A	H	A	A	A	H	A	H	A	H	A	H
Result	L	D	L	W	D	L	W	L	L	D	L	D	L	D	L	W	L	W	W	D	W	D	W	W	L	D	L	W	W	L	D	W	L	D	W	W
Position	10	9	9	8	7	8	6	7	7	7	7	7	7	7	7	7	7	7	7	7	7	7	7	7	7	7	7	8	8	8	7	7	8	8	8	7

Updated to match(es) played on 30 May 2019. Source: Competitive matches
A = Away; H = Home; W = Win; D = Draw; L = Loss

==== Matches ====
18 August 2018 1	Tirana	0–1	Kamza	Tirana
19:45 CEST	Hoxhallari (yellow card) 54'; Karabeci (yellow card) 54'	Report	Frashëri (yellow card) 42'; Teqja (yellow card) 61'; Arrabal (yellow card) 77'; Avdyli (yellow card) 80'; Plaku 89'	Stadium: Selman Stërmasi Stadium; Attendance: 3,000; Referee: Andi Koçi

24 August 2018 2	Tirana	0–0	Teuta Durrës	Tirana
19:45 CEST	Mawejje (yellow card) 70'	Report	Vecaj (yellow card) 60'; Hakaj (yellow card) 78'	Stadium: Selman Stërmasi Stadium; Attendance: 2,000; Referee: Kridens Meta

2 September 2018 3	Kukësi	3–1	Tirana	Shkodër
19:45 CEST	Reginaldo 2', 45+2', 64'; Frashëri (yellow card) 75'	Report	Muçi 61'; Cake (yellow card) 90+1'	Stadium: Loro Boriçi Stadium; Attendance: 500; Referee: Juxhin Xhaja

16 September 2018 4	Tirana	3–1	Luftëtari Gjirokastër	Tirana
18:45 CEST	Blazhevski 3'; Hoxhallari (yellow card) 18' (yellow-red card) 55'; Turtulli 24'; Daja (yellow card) 39'; Greca 90+4', (yellow card) 90+4'	Report	Doka 14' (o.g.): Janičić (yellow card) 15' (yellow-red card) 71'; Milosavljev (yellow card) 46'; Ramadani (yellow card) 54'; Ymeraj (yellow card) 66'	Stadium: Selman Stërmasi Stadium; Attendance: 1,200; Referee: Eldorjan Hamiti

22 September 2018 5	Skënderbeu Korçë	1–1	Tirana	Korçë
18:45 CEST	Lulaj (yellow card) 6'; Radaš (yellow card) 27'; Abazi (yellow card) 59'; Vangjeli (yellow card) 76'; John 85'	Report	Hasani 20'; Imami (yellow card) 58'; Doka (yellow card) 67'; Greca (yellow card) 76'	Stadium: Skënderbeu Stadium; Referee: Orlando Kuka

28 September 2018 6	Tirana	0–1	Partizani Tirana	Tirana
19:45 CEST	Turtulli (yellow card) 19'; Mawejje (yellow card) 29'; Blazhevski (yellow card) 68'	Report	Mala 22'; Hila (yellow card) 40'; Belica (yellow card) 51'; Telushi (yellow card) 56'; Trashi (yellow card) 68'	Stadium: Selman Stërmasi Stadium; Attendance: 7,000; Referee: Enea Jorgji

3 October 2018 7	Kastrioti Krujë	2–3	Tirana	Fushë-Krujë
13:45 CEST	Bardhi 30'; Shehu (yellow card) 58', (goal) 81'	Report	Stijepović 34' (o.g.); Blazhevski 37', 74', (yellow card) 38'; Turtulli (yellow card) 45'	Stadium: Redi Maloku Stadium; Attendance: 700; Referee: Laver Alla

7 October 2018 8	Tirana	0–1	Laçi	Tirana
16:45 CEST	Blazhevski (yellow card) 48'; Daja (yellow card) 52'; Imami (yellow card) 85'	Report	Fangaj (yellow card) 3'; Lushkja (yellow card) 20'; Xhixha 50'; Selmani (yellow card) 77'; Toro (yellow card) 80'	Stadium: Selman Stërmasi Stadium; Attendance: 700; Referee: Eldorjan Hamiti

22 October 2018 9	Flamurtari Vlorë	1–0	Tirana	Vlorë
18:00 CEST	Položani (yellow card) 31'; Danilo Alves (yellow card) 36', (goal) 72'; Torassa (yellow card) 66'; Siljanovski (yellow card) 78'	Report	Turtulli (yellow card) 13'; Imami (yellow card) 68'	Stadium: Flamurtari Stadium; Attendance: 1,000; Referee: Laver Alla

27 October 2018 10	Kamza	1–1	Tirana	Kamëz
14:00 CEST	Bruno Arrabal (yellow card) 30'; Fukui 69'; Frashëri (yellow card) 80'	Report	Sentamu (yellow card) 20', (goal) 64'; Daja (yellow card) 45'	Stadium: Kamëz Stadium; Attendance: 1,000; Referee: Olsi Sokoli

2 November 2018 11	Teuta Durrës	2–1	Tirana	Shijak
14:00 CET	Bicaj 70', 73'; Gjorgievski (yellow card) 80'	Report	Hasani 27'	Stadium: Tofik Jashari Stadium; Attendance: 500; Referee: Klajdi Kola

6 November 2018 12	Tirana	0–0	Kukësi	Tirana
18:00 CET	Abibi (yellow card) 31'; Karabeci (yellow card) 45'; Daja (yellow card) 72'	Report	Shkodra (yellow card) 62'; Ethemi (yellow card) 65'; William Cordeiro (yellow card) 81' (yellow-red card) 88'	Stadium: Selman Stërmasi Stadium; Attendance: 2,500; Referee: Enea Jorgji

11 November 2018 13	Luftëtari Gjirokastër	2–1	Tirana	Gjirokastër
14:00 CET	Janičić (yellow card) 17'; Rroca (yellow card) 45'; Shkurtaj 50' (pen.); Dunga 88'	Report	Sentamu 36', (yellow card) 45+1'; Greca (yellow card) 47'	Stadium: Gjirokastër Stadium; Attendance: 800; Referee: Eldorjan Hamiti

24 November 2018 14	Tirana	1–1	Skënderbeu Korçë	Tirana
14:00 CET	Sentamu (yellow card) 17', (goal) 45'; Hasani (yellow card) 38'; Greca (yellow card) 47'; Daja (yellow card) 90+4'	Report	Dita 35'	Stadium: Selman Stërmasi Stadium; Referee: Juxhin Xhaja

30 November 2018 15	Partizani Tirana	2–1	Tirana	Tirana
18:00 CET	Trashi (yellow card) 31'; Ibrahimi (yellow card) 38'; Hebaj 66', 86'	Report	Daja (yellow card) 21'; Hoxhallari (yellow card) 29'; Halili 50'; Hasani (yellow card) 51'; Kërçiku (yellow card) 90'	Stadium: Selman Stërmasi Stadium; Attendance: 6,000; Referee: Eldorjan Hamiti

8 December 2018 16	Tirana	4–0	Kastrioti Krujë	Tirana
14:00 CET	Hasani 11' (pen.); Greca 40'; Sentamu (yellow card) 52', (goal) 90'; Ngoo 77'	Report	Kuka (yellow card) 10'; Ymeraj (yellow card) 66'	Stadium: Selman Stërmasi Stadium; Referee: Laver Alla

15 December 2018 17	Laçi	2–1	Tirana	Laç
14:00 CET	Xhixha (yellow card) 7'; Shtubina 14'; Fangaj 25'; Sefgjinaj (yellow card) 35'	Report	Doka (yellow card) 13'; Ngoo (yellow card) 62'; Hasani 73'; Hoxhallari (yellow card) 89'	Stadium: Laçi Stadium; Attendance: 500; Referee: Adrian Beqiri

21 December 2018 18	Tirana	1–0	Flamurtari Vlorë	Tirana
16:30 CET	Kërçiku (yellow card) 44'; Hasani (yellow card) 65', (goal) 87'; Greca (yellow card) 85'	Report	Položani (yellow card) 47'; Batha (yellow card) 65'	Stadium: Selman Stërmasi Stadium; Attendance: 700; Referee: Andi Koçi

27 January 2019 19	Tirana	4–1	Kamza	Tirana
18:00 CET	Hasani 59', 72', (yellow card) 74'; Daja (yellow card) 63'; Ngoo 66'; Doka 75'	Report	Beqiri (yellow card) 5' (yellow-red card) 41'; Plaku 30'; Idrizaj (yellow card) 70'	Stadium: Selman Stërmasi Stadium; Attendance: 700; Referee: Kridens Meta

1 February 2019 20	Tirana	1–1	Teuta Durrës	Tirana
18:00 CET	Ngoo 38'; Halili (yellow card) 39'; Karabeci (yellow card) 49'; Daja (yellow card) 79'	Report	Progni 2'; Bicaj (yellow card) 60'; Vecaj (yellow card) 68'; Traorè (yellow card) 74'	Stadium: Selman Stërmasi Stadium

10 February 2019 21	Kukësi	0–1	Tirana	Kamëz
14:00 CET	Teqja (yellow card) 22'; Cuculi (yellow card) 36'	Report	Greca (yellow card) 16'; Doka 87' (yellow card) 87'	Stadium: Kamëz Stadium; Attendance: 2,000; Referee: Eldorjan Hamiti

17 February 2019 22	Tirana	1–1	Luftëtari Gjirokastër	Tirana
17:00 CET	Hoxhallari (yellow card) 63'; Cobbinah 90+3'	Report	Aleksi 21'; Hoxha (yellow card) 56'; Ramadani (yellow card) 85'	Stadium: Selman Stërmasi Stadium; Attendance: 1,200; Referee: Kridens Meta

22 February 2019 23	Skënderbeu Korçë	1–2	Tirana	Korçë
18:00 CET	Sibo 45'	Report	Cobbinah 26'; Mawejje (yellow card) 32'; Atinga (yellow card) 41'; Kërçiku (yellow card) 75'; Ngoo 89'	Stadium: Skënderbeu Stadium; Attendance: 2,000; Referee: Laver Alla

1 March 2019 24	Tirana	0–0	Partizani Tirana	Tirana
18:00 CET	Hoxhallari (yellow card) 46'; Turtulli (yellow card) 51'; Ngoo (yellow card) 65'	Report	Duka (yellow card) 28'; Atanda (yellow card) 75'; Kalari (yellow card) 87'; Rexhepi (yellow card) 90'	Stadium: Selman Stërmasi Stadium; Attendance: 8,000; Referee: Enea Jorgji

17 March 2019 (Note: The match was originally scheduled to be played on 9 March, but it was delayed due to the boycott of the Union of Albanian football referees due to insecure conditions at the stadiums.) 25	Kastrioti Krujë	1–0	Tirana	Fushë-Krujë
14:00 CET	Marku 27'; Hussein (yellow card) 38'; Çela (yellow card) 65'; Çekrezi (yellow card) 81'	Report	Mawejje (yellow card) 4'; Ngoo (yellow card) 9'; Karabeci (yellow card) 32'; Sentamu (yellow card) 90+2'	Stadium: Redi Maloku Stadium; Attendance: 1,000; Referee: Olsi Sokoli

30 March 2019 26	Tirana	1–1	Laçi	Tirana
17:00 CEST	Daja (yellow card) 28'; Sentamu 45+1'; Halili (yellow card) 70'	Report	Sefgjinaj (yellow card) 58'; Najdenov (red card) 90+5'; Xhixha 90+9'	Stadium: Selman Stërmasi Stadium; Attendance: 800; Referee: Kridens Meta

6 April 2019 27	Flamurtari Vlorë	1–0	Tirana	Vlorë
18:45 CEST	Sukaj 28'; Batha (yellow card) 30'; Deliaj (yellow card) 72'	Report	Turtulli (yellow card) 6'; Mawejje (yellow card) 35'; Kërçiku (yellow card) 85'	Stadium: Flamurtari Stadium; Attendance: 1,500; Referee: Enea Jorgji

10 April 2019 28	Tirana	3–0; Awarded (Note: The match was awarded due to the exclusion of Kamza.)	Kamza	Tirana
				Stadium: Selman Stërmasi Stadium

15 April 2019 29	Teuta Durrës	1–3	Tirana	Durrës
18:45 CEST	Progni (yellow card) 32'; Sidibe (yellow card) 43'; Camara 73'	Report	Oduamadi 42'; Hasani 65'; Karabeci 74'	Stadium: Niko Dovana Stadium; Attendance: 1,000; Referee: Eldorjan Hamiti

20 April 2019 30	Tirana	0–2	Kukësi	Tirana
19:00 CEST	Ngoo (yellow card) 47'; Mawejje (yellow card) 62'	Report	Shkurti 34', 90+4'	Stadium: Selman Stërmasi Stadium; Referee: Juxhin Xhaja

28 April 2019 31	Luftëtari Gjirokastër	1–1	Tirana	Gjirokastër
16:00 CEST	Demo (yellow card) 8'; Rapo 49'; Fili (yellow card) 85'	Report	Hasani 9' (pen.)	Stadium: Gjirokastër Stadium; Attendance: 500; Referee: Kridens Meta

4 May 2019 32	Tirana	1–0	Skënderbeu Korçë	Tirana
15:00 CEST	Ngoo (yellow card) 50'; Cobbinah (yellow card) 58'; Daja (yellow card) 69'; Hoxhallari (yellow card) 78'; Mawejje (yellow card) 80'; Greca (yellow card) 90'; Hasani 90+1'	Report	Sambou (yellow card) 58'	Stadium: Selman Stërmasi Stadium; Referee: Laver Alla

12 May 2019 33	Partizani Tirana	2–1	Tirana	Tirana
16:30 CEST	Çinari 30', 72', (yellow card) 30'; Ibrahimi (yellow card) 57'; Kalari (yellow card) 90'	Report	Turtulli (yellow card) 23'; Greca 40'; Daja (yellow card) 45'; Ngoo (yellow card) 90+2'	Stadium: Selman Stërmasi Stadium; Attendance: 8,000; Referee: Kridens Meta

18 May 2019 34	Tirana	0–0	Kastrioti Krujë	Tirana
16:30 CEST	Hoxhallari (yellow card) 28'; Turtulli (yellow card) 35'; Kërçiku (yellow card) 75'	Report	Marku (yellow card) 43'; Çela (yellow card) 66'; Ndreca (yellow card) 90'	Stadium: Selman Stërmasi Stadium; Referee: Dimitar Mečkarovski (North Macedonia)

26 May 2019 35	Laçi	1–3	Tirana	Laç
16:30 CEST	Lushkja (yellow card) 17'; Çokaj (yellow card) 43'; Mersinaj (yellow card) 54'; Shtubina 61'; Gjoni (yellow card) 78'; Berisha (yellow card) 86'; Eller (yellow card) 90'	Report	Greca 6'; Mawejje (yellow card) 22'; Hasani (yellow card) 27', (goal) 84'; Cobbinah 36'; Goxha (yellow card) 48'; Ngoo (yellow card) 54'	Stadium: Laçi Stadium; Attendance: 1,200; Referee: Enea Jorgji

30 May 2019 36	Tirana	3–0	Flamurtari Vlorë	Tirana
16:00 CEST	Kërçiku (yellow card) 45+3'; Doka 65', 67'; Hasani 80'	Report	Haruni (yellow card) 29'	Stadium: Selman Stërmasi Stadium; Attendance: 1,200; Referee: Kridens Meta

=== Albanian Cup ===
==== First round ====
12 September 2018 First leg	Iliria Fushë-Krujë	1–4	Tirana	Fushë-Krujë
16:00 CEST	Xhebrahimi 8'; Sala (yellow card) 24'; Baku (yellow card) 34'; Zuna (yellow card) 43' (yellow-red card) 45'	Report	Cobbinah 31', 48'; Turtulli 44'; Blazhevski 75'; Mawejje (yellow card) 85'	Stadium: Redi Maloku Stadium; Attendance: 450; Referee: Edvin Hoxha

25 September 2018 Second leg	Tirana	4–0 (8–1 agg.)	Iliria Fushë-Krujë	Tirana
15:30 CEST	Sentamu 23', 28', 38'; Çelhaka (yellow card) 43'; Greca (yellow card) 75'; Ngoo 80'; Atinga (yellow card) 87'	Report	Hoxha (yellow card) 34'; Selmani (yellow card) 78'; Baku (yellow card) 89'	Stadium: Skënder Halili Complex; Attendance: 200; Referee: Xhulio Mema

==== Second round ====
23 January 2019 First leg	Tirana	2–0	Flamurtari Vlorë	Tirana
14:00 CET	Hoxhallari (yellow card) 14', (goal) 38'; Ngoo 35'; Karabeci (yellow card) 73'; Hasani (yellow card) 85'	Report	Useini (yellow card) 44'; Deliaj (yellow card) 49'; Torassa (yellow card) 85'	Stadium: Selman Stërmasi Stadium; Referee: Kreshnik Barjamaj

6 February 2019 Second leg	Flamurtari Vlorë	1–0 (1–2 agg.)	Tirana	Vlorë
13:30 CET	Torassa (yellow card) 5'; Calé (yellow card) 17', (goal) 49'; Položani (yellow card) 53'; Sukaj (yellow card) 70'; Musta (yellow card) 87'; Alla (yellow card) 90+3'	Report	Halili (red card) 17'; Doka (yellow card) 26'; Ngoo (yellow card) 88'; Abibi (yellow card) 90+2'	Stadium: Flamurtari Stadium; Referee: Laver Alla

==== Quarter-finals ====
13 March 2019 First leg	Tirana	3–0	Laçi	Tirana
17:00 CET	Ngoo 53', 65', (yellow card) 60'; Hasani 73'; Hoxhallari (yellow card) 76'; Turtulli (yellow card) 82'	Report	Sefgjinaj (yellow card) 74'	Stadium: Selman Stërmasi Stadium; Referee: Laver Alla

3 April 2019 Second leg	Laçi	2–0 (2–3 agg.)	Tirana	Laç
14:00	Shtubina 29'; Çokaj 48'; Sefgjinaj (yellow card) 64'	Report	Mawejje (yellow card) 40'; Abibi (yellow card) 64'; Imami (yellow card) 90+2'	Stadium: Laçi Stadium; Attendance: 1,500; Referee: Juxhin Xhaja

==== Semi-finals ====
24 April 2019 First leg	Luftëtari Gjirokastër	0–0	Tirana	Gjirokastër
16:00 CEST		Report		Stadium: Gjirokastra Stadium; Attendance: 800; Referee: Enea Jorgji

8 May 2019 Second leg	Tirana	5–3 (5–3 agg.)	Luftëtari Gjirokastër	Tirana
17:00 CEST	Halili (yellow card) 10'; Daja 21', (yellow card) 54'; Greca (yellow card) 29'; Cobbinah 47' (pen.); Ngoo 53'; Sentamu 75', 86'	Report	Dunga (yellow card) 40'; Fili 41'; Oshafi (yellow card) 60', (goal) 79'; Neziri 90+5'	Stadium: Selman Stërmasi Stadium; Referee: Eldorjan Hamiti

==== Final ====
2 June 2019 Final	Kukësi	2–1	Tirana	Elbasan
20:00 CEST	Shkurtaj 4', (yellow card) 90+2'; Reginaldo 78'; Ethemi (yellow card) 83'	Report	Hoxhallari (yellow card) 16'; Ngoo 66'; Çelhaka (yellow card) 72'; Greca (yellow card) 85'; Doka (yellow card) 90+2'	Stadium: Elbasan Arena; Attendance: 1,500; Referee: Enea Jorgji

== Statistics ==
=== Squad stats ===
	League	Cup	Total Stats
Games played	24	5	29
Games won	7	4	12
Games drawn	8	0	8
Games lost	9	1	10
Goals scored	28	13	41
Goals conceded	25	2	27
Goal difference	+3	+11	+14
Clean sheets	6	3	9

Last updated: 13 March 2019
Source: Soccerway

=== Top scorers ===
No.	Pos.	Nation	Name	Kategoria Superiore	Albanian Cup	Total
77	FW	(North Macedonia)	Dejan Blazhevski	3	1	4
11	FW	(Uganda)	Yunus Sentamu	0	3	3
8	MF	(Ghana)	Winful Cobbinah	0	2	2
5	DF	(Albania)	Marvin Turtulli	1	1	2
7	MF	(Albania)	Bedri Greca	1	0	1
16	MF	(Albania)	Edon Hasani	1	0	1
20	FW	(Albania)	Ernest Muçi	1	0	1
45	FW	(England)	Michael Ngoo	0	1	1
#	Own goals			1	0	1
TOTAL				8	8	16

Last updated: 3 October 2018

=== Clean sheets ===
The list is sorted by shirt number when total appearances are equal.

Rnk	No.	Player	Kategoria Superiore	Albanian Cup	Total
1	81	(Albania) Alessio Abibi	1	0	1
2	89	(Albania) Shpëtim Moçka	0	1	1
TOTALS			1	1	2

Last updated: 25 September 2018
