= 2019–20 Albanian Cup =

Kupa e Shqipërisë

Tournament details
- Country: Albania
- Teams: 34

Final positions
- Champions: Teuta
- Runners-up: Tirana

Tournament statistics
- Matches played: 63
- Goals scored: 171 (2.71 per match)
- Top goal scorer(s): Ernest Muçi (5 goals)

2019–20 Albanian Cup (Albanian: Kupa e Shqipërisë) is the sixty-eighth season of Albania's annual cup competition. Kukësi are the defending champions. Teuta won the cup for the fourth time in their history.

== Format ==
Ties are played in a two-legged format similar to those of European competitions. If the aggregate score is tied after both games, the team with the higher number of away goals advances. If the number of away goals is equal in both games, the match is decided by extra time and a penalty shoot-out, if necessary.

== Preliminary round ==
In order to reduce the number of participating teams for the first round to 32, a preliminary tournament is played. In contrast to the main tournament, the preliminary tournament is held as a single-leg knock-out competition. Matches were played on 4 September 2019.

| Team 1 | Score | Team 2 |
|---|---|---|
| Vora (III) | 0−0 (4−3 p) | Luzi 2008 (III) |
| Tomori (III) | 0−3 | Shkumbini (II) |

== First round ==
All 30 teams of the 2019–20 Kategoria Superiore and Kategoria e Parë entered in this round along with the two qualifiers from the preliminary round. The first legs were played on 18 September 2019 and the second legs took place on 1 and 2 October 2019.

| Team 1 | Agg. | Team 2 | 1st leg | 2nd leg |
|---|---|---|---|---|
| Vora (III) | 0−4 | Partizani (I) | 0−3 | 0−1 |
| Tërbuni (II) | 2−8 | Teuta (I) | 0−2 | 2−6 |
| Veleçiku (II) | 3−7 | Flamurtari (I) | 3−2 | 0−5 |
| Shënkolli (II) | 0−4 | Tirana (I) | 0−0 | 0−4 |
| Iliria (II) | 2−2 (a) | Kastrioti (II) | 2−1 | 0−1 |
| Burreli (II) | 0−3 | Vllaznia (I) | 0−1 | 0−2 |
| Erzeni (II) | 4−0 | Dinamo Tirana (II) | 3−0 | 1−0 |
| Korabi (II) | 2−2 (a) | Besëlidhja (II) | 2−1 | 0−1 |
| Shkumbini (II) | 1−9 | Kukësi (I) | 1−3 | 0−6 |
| Devolli (II) | 3−4 | Skënderbeu (I) | 1−4 | 2−0 |
| Elbasani (II) | 0−4 | Laçi (I) | 0−0 | 0−4 |
| Turbina (II) | 1−3 | Luftëtari (I) | 0−1 | 1−2 |
| Apolonia (II) | 6−0 | Kamza (III) | 3−0 | 3−0 |
| Pogradeci (II) | 2−5 | Bylis (I) | 0−4 | 2−1 |
| Egnatia (II) | 0−3 | Besa (II) | 0−1 | 0−2 |
| Lushnja (II) | 4−1 | Oriku (II) | 2−1 | 2−0 |

| 18 September 2019 | Vora | 0−3 | Partizani | Internacional Complex, Pezë Helmës |
| 16:00 CEST | | | Solomon 64'; Brown 74'; Çinari 78' | Referee: Endrit Zhuli |

| 1 October 2019 | Partizani | 1−0 | Vora | Internacional Complex, Pezë Helmës |
| 14:00 CEST | Telushi 68' (pen.) | | | Referee: Ervis Alliaj |

Partizani advanced to the second round.

| 18 September 2019 | Tërbuni | 0−2 | Teuta | QKS Kamëz, Kamëz |
| 15:00 CEST | | | Gashi 72'; Vecaj 88' | Referee: Klodjan Prenga |

| 2 October 2019 | Teuta | 6−2 | Tërbuni | Olympic Park, Durrës |
| 14:00 CEST | Vila 8', 53'; Kapllani 12'; Kalaja 58', 67'; Nikač 84' | | Isaraj 29'; Veriu 51' | Referee: Ardit Merdanaj |

Teuta advanced to the second round.

| 18 September 2019 | Veleçiku | 3−2 | Flamurtari | Reshit Rusi Stadium, Shkodër |
| 16:00 CEST | Çokaj 4' (pen.); Zaraj 67'; Banushaj 90' | | Hoxhaj 14', 20' | Referee: Erik Kaso |

| 2 October 2019 | Flamurtari | 5−0 | Veleçiku | Pylli i Sodës, Vlorë |
| 14:00 CEST | Sukaj 60', 64'; Ribaj 71'; Nebihi 81'; Nika 85' | | | Referee: Klodian Shahini |

Flamurtari advanced to the second round.

| 18 September 2019 | Shënkolli | 0−0 | Tirana | Shënkoll Stadium, Shënkoll |
| 16:00 CEST | | | | Referee: Indrit Myrtja |

| 2 October 2019 | Tirana | 4−0 | Shënkolli | Selman Stërmasi Stadium, Tirana |
| 14:00 CEST | Karabeci 30'; Muçi 38'; Çelhaka 41'; Cobbinah 85' | | | Referee: Blerim Ziri |

Tirana advanced to the second round.

| 18 September 2019 | Iliria | 2−1 | Kastrioti | Redi Maloku Stadium, Fushë-Krujë |
| 16:00 CEST | Doçi 33'; Lama 35' (pen.) | | Mehmeti 14' | Referee: Florjan Lata |

| 2 October 2019 | Kastrioti | 1−0 | Iliria | Redi Maloku Stadium, Fushë-Krujë |
| 14:00 CEST | Basha 41' | | | Referee: Emirion Sino |

Kastrioti advanced to the second round.

| 18 September 2019 | Burreli | 0−1 | Vllaznia | Liri Ballabani Stadium, Burrel |
| 16:00 CEST | | | Wenderson 25' | Referee: Fiorelo Pjetrushi |

| 2 October 2019 | Vllaznia | 2−0 | Burreli | Loro Boriçi Stadium, Shkodër |
| 14:00 CEST | Wenderson 22'; Emerson Sinho 24' | | | Referee: Fiorelo Pjetrushi |

Vllaznia advanced to the second round.

| 18 September 2019 | Erzeni | 3−0 | Dinamo Tirana | Tofik Jashari Stadium, Shijak |
| 16:00 CEST | Cabral 21'; Rezi 51'; Djidjiwa 84' | | | Referee: Albano Stolaj |

| 2 October 2019 | Dinamo Tirana | 0−1 | Erzeni | Internacional Complex, Pezë Helmës |
| 14:00 CEST | | | Rezi 67' | Referee: Sokol Bebja |

Erzeni advanced to the second round.

| 18 September 2019 | Korabi | 2−1 | Besëlidhja | Korabi Stadium, Peshkopi |
| 16:00 CEST | Dida 68'; Gjongecaj 80' | | Merdini 62' | Referee: Bekris Dragusha |

| 2 October 2019 | Besëlidhja | 1−0 | Korabi | Brian Filipi Stadium, Lezhë |
| 14:00 CEST | Djordjević 63' | | | Referee: Albano Stolaj |

Besëlidhja advanced to the second round.

| 18 September 2019 | Shkumbini | 1−3 | Kukësi | Shkumbini Stadium, Peqin |
| 16:00 CEST | Koreshi 31' (pen.) | | Maliqi 6'; Camara 35'; Daku 71' (pen.) | Referee: Olsi Sokoli |

| 1 October 2019 | Kukësi | 6−0 | Shkumbini | QKS Kamëz, Kamëz |
| 14:00 CEST | Domi 11'; Çema 20' (pen.), 39', 90'; Daku 33'; Rasha 79' | | | Referee: Endrit Zhuli |

Kukësi advanced to the second round.

| 18 September 2019 | Devolli | 1−4 | Skënderbeu | Devolli Stadium, Bilisht |
| 16:00 CEST | Tako 80' | | Dita 45' (pen.); Vitia 78'; Pollozhani 89'; Muja 90+1' | Referee: Sokol Bebja |

| 2 October 2019 | Skënderbeu | 0−2 | Devolli | Skënderbeu Stadium, Korçë |
| 14:00 CEST | | | Rapo 35'; Silva 85' | Referee: Mario Shabanaj |

Skënderbeu advanced to the second round.

| 18 September 2019 | Elbasani | 0−0 | Laçi | Elbasan Arena, Elbasan |
| 16:00 CEST | | | | Referee: Ardit Merdanaj |

| 2 October 2019 | Laçi | 4−0 | Elbasani | QKS Kamëz, Kamëz |
| 14:00 CEST | Fangaj 18'; Maici 36', 50'; Berisha 47' | | | Referee: Roxhers Muska |

Laçi advanced to the second round.

| 18 September 2019 | Turbina | 0−1 | Luftëtari | Nexhip Trungu Stadium, Cërrik |
| 16:00 CEST | | | Fili 90' (pen.) | Referee: Elton Hazizaj |

| 1 October 2019 | Luftëtari | 2−1 | Turbina | Gjirokastra Stadium, Gjirokastër |
| 14:00 CEST | Rapo 41'; Vyent 49' | | Peqini 67' | Referee: Dorjan Maletaj |

Luftëtari advanced to the second round.

| Apolonia | 3−0; Awarded | Kamza |

| Kamza | 0−3; Awarded | Apolonia |

Apolonia advanced to the second round.

| 18 September 2019 | Pogradeci | 0−4 | Bylis | Gjorgji Kyçyku Stadium, Pogradec |
| 16:00 CEST | | | Ndreca 17', 49'; Opoku 68'; Goxha 76' | Referee: Ervin Kotemelo |

| 2 October 2019 | Bylis | 1−2 | Pogradeci | Adush Muça Stadium, Ballsh |
| 14:00 CEST | Bajramaj 75' | | Olli 24'; Dervishi 45' | Referee: Mikele Dyrmishi |

Bylis advanced to the second round.

| 18 September 2019 | Egnatia | 0−1 | Besa | Hasan Zyla Stadium, Rrogozhinë |
| 16:00 CEST | | | Hoxha 66' | Referee: Geisi Velcani |

| 2 October 2019 | Besa | 2−0 | Egnatia | Fusha e Vjetër, Kavajë |
| 14:00 CEST | Hoxha 16'; Cara 45' | | | Referee: Elidon Halo |

Besa advanced to the second round.

| 18 September 2019 | Lushnja | 2−1 | Oriku | Roza Haxhiu Stadium, Lushnjë |
| 16:00 CEST | Allkanjari 14', 54' | | Dhrami 8' | Referee: Elidon Halo |

| 2 October 2019 | Oriku | 0−2 | Lushnja | Petro Ruci Stadium, Orikum |
| 14:00 CEST | | | Allkanjari 17'; Mezini 40' | Referee: Indrit Myrtja |

Lushnja advanced to the second round.

== Second round ==
All the 16 qualified teams from the first round progressed to the second round. The first legs were played on 29 and 30 January 2020 and the second legs took place on 12 February 2020.

| Team 1 | Agg. | Team 2 | 1st leg | 2nd leg |
|---|---|---|---|---|
| Besëlidhja (II) | 4−3 | Partizani (I) | 3−0 | 1−3 |
| Erzeni (II) | 2−6 | Teuta (I) | 1−3 | 1−3 |
| Vllaznia (I) | 4−2 | Flamurtari (I) | 2−2 | 2−0 |
| Kastrioti (II) | 1−7 | Tirana (I) | 1−3 | 0−4 |
| Lushnja (II) | 0−4 | Kukësi (I) | 0−1 | 0−3 |
| Besa (II) | 0−3 | Skënderbeu (I) | 0−2 | 0−1 |
| Bylis (I) | 4−3 | Laçi (I) | 2−0 | 2−3 |
| Apolonia (II) | 3−0 | Luftëtari (I) | 3−0 | 0−0 |

| 29 January 2020 | Besëlidhja | 3−0 | Partizani | Brian Filipi Stadium, Lezhë |
| 14:00 CET | Bushi 13'; Jovanovic 26'; Fetaj 44' | | | Referee: Blerim Ziri |

| 12 February 2020 | Partizani | 3−1 | Besëlidhja | Elbasan Arena, Elbasan |
| 13:30 CET | Telushi 8', 20' (pen.), 84' | | Hajdari 5' | Referee: Kridens Meta |

Besëlidhja advanced to the quarter finals.

| 29 January 2020 | Erzeni | 1−3 | Teuta | Tofik Jashari Stadium, Shijak |
| 14:00 CET | Rezi 84' | | Kallaku 57' (pen.); Colubali 73'; Gruda 82' | Referee: Emirion Sino |

| 12 February 2020 | Teuta | 3−1 | Erzeni | Olympic Park, Durrës |
| 13:30 CET | Hoxha 47'; Kalaja 75' (pen.); Beqja 90+2' (pen.) | | Djidjiwa 8' | Referee: Hermal Llapra |

Teuta advanced to the quarter finals.

| 29 January 2020 | Vllaznia | 2−2 | Flamurtari | Loro Boriçi Stadium, Shkodër |
| 14:00 CET | Zogaj 2'; Lika 78' | | Nebihi 8'; Ribaj 17' | Referee: Emanuela Rusta |

| 12 February 2020 | Flamurtari | 0−2 | Vllaznia | Flamurtari Stadium, Vlorë |
| 13:30 CET | | | Sílvio Rodrigues 28' (pen.), 74' | Referee: Enea Jorgji |

Vllaznia advanced to the quarter finals.

| 29 January 2020 | Kastrioti | 1−3 | Tirana | Redi Maloku Stadium, Fushë-Krujë |
| 14:00 CET | Ajazi 10' | | Ismajlgeci 47'; Muçi 60', 85' (pen.) | Referee: Hermal Llapra |

| 12 February 2020 | Tirana | 4−0 | Kastrioti | Selman Stërmasi Stadium, Tirana |
| 13:30 CET | Halili 13'; Beshiraj 19'; Morina 62'; Kraja 78' | | | Referee: Klajdi Kola |

Tirana advanced to the quarter finals.

| 29 January 2020 | Lushnja | 0−1 | Kukësi | Roza Haxhiu Stadium, Lushnjë |
| 14:00 CET | | | Maliqi 19' | Referee: Orlando Kuka |

| 12 February 2020 | Kukësi | 3−0 | Lushnja | Internacional Complex, Pezë Helmës |
| 13:30 CET | Rroca 47'; Cooper 50', 88' | | | Referee: Mirela Çemeri |

Kukësi advanced to the quarter finals.

| 29 January 2020 | Besa | 0−2 | Skënderbeu | Internacional Complex, Pezë Helmës |
| 14:00 CET | | | Essien 35'; Mara 57' | Referee: Roxhers Muska |

| 12 February 2020 | Skënderbeu | 1−0 | Besa | Skënderbeu Stadium, Korçë |
| 13:30 CET | Mensah 39' | | | Referee: Eraldo Demiraj |

Skënderbeu advanced to the quarter finals.

| 30 January 2020 | Bylis | 2−0 | Laçi | Adush Muça Stadium, Ballsh |
| 14:00 CET | Shkalla 68'; Ndreca 87' | | | Referee: Klodian Shahini |

| 12 February 2020 | Laçi | 3−2 | Bylis | Laçi Stadium, Laç |
| 13:30 CET | Greca 18'; Nwabueze 51' (pen.); Xhixha 90+3' | | Hidi 58' (pen.); Guindo 70' | Referee: Eldorjan Hamiti |

Bylis advanced to the quarter finals.

| 29 January 2020 | Apolonia | 3−0 | Luftëtari | Loni Papuçiu Stadium, Fier |
| 14:00 CET | Mehmeti 82'; Zaimaj 87'; Zoga 90+3' | | | Referee: Andi Koçi |

| 12 February 2020 | Luftëtari | 0−0 | Apolonia | Gjirokastra Stadium, Gjirokastër |
| 13:30 CET | | | | Referee: Juxhin Xhaja |

Apolonia advanced to the quarter finals.

== Quarter-finals ==
All eight qualified teams from the second round progressed to the quarter-finals. The first legs were played on 11 June 2020 and the second legs took place on 24 June 2020.

| Team 1 | Agg. | Team 2 | 1st leg | 2nd leg |
|---|---|---|---|---|
| Tirana (I) | 6−2 | Besëlidhja (II) | 5–1 | 1−1 |
| Vllaznia (I) | 2−3 | Teuta (I) | 2–2 | 0−1 |
| Apolonia (II) | 2−5 | Kukësi (I) | 1–2 | 1−3 |
| Bylis (I) | 2−1 | Skënderbeu (I) | 1–0 | 1−1 |

| 11 June 2020 | Tirana | 5–1 | Besëlidhja | Selman Stërmasi Stadium, Tirana |
| 17:00 CEST | Batha 26' (pen.); Calé 37', 68'; Torassa 62'; Sidibe 80' | | Hoxha 11' | Referee: Orlando Kuka |

| 24 June 2020 | Besëlidhja | 1−1 | Tirana | Brian Filipi Stadium, Lezhë |
| 16:30 CEST | Djordjević 47' | Report | Muçi 90+2' | Referee: Mirela Çemeri |

Tirana advanced to the semi finals.

| 11 June 2020 | Vllaznia | 2–2 | Teuta | Loro Boriçi Stadium, Shkodër |
| 17:00 CEST | Zogaj 7'; Hygor 21' (pen.) | | Kallaku 78'; Kapllani 90+4' | Referee: Enea Jorgji |

| 24 June 2020 | Teuta | 1−0 | Vllaznia | Niko Dovana Stadium, Durrës |
| 16:30 CEST | Arapi 76' | Report | | Referee: Eldorjan Hamiti |

Teuta advanced to the semi finals.

| 11 June 2020 | Apolonia | 1–2 | Kukësi | Loni Papuçiu Stadium, Fier |
| 17:00 CEST | Eyoh 70' | | Cooper 33'; Lulaj 90+3' | Referee: Juxhin Xhaja |

| 24 June 2020 | Kukësi | 3−1 | Apolonia | Elbasan Arena, Elbasan |
| 16:30 CEST | Lulaj 27'; Shkurtaj 43'; Ethemi 48' | Report | Gjata 75' (pen.) | Referee: Hermal Llapra |

Kukësi advanced to the semi finals.

| 11 June 2020 | Bylis | 1–0 | Skënderbeu | Adush Muça Stadium, Ballsh |
| 17:00 CEST | Bajramaj 56' | Report | | Referee: Roxhers Muska |

| 24 June 2020 | Skënderbeu | 1−1 | Bylis | Skënderbeu Stadium, Korçë |
| 19:30 CEST | Mensah 34' | | Malci 75' | Referee: Enea Jorgji |

Bylis advanced to the semi finals.

== Semi-finals ==
The first legs were played on 2 July and the second legs were played on 15 July 2020.

| Team 1 | Agg. | Team 2 | 1st leg | 2nd leg |
|---|---|---|---|---|
| Kukësi (I) | 1–2 | Teuta (I) | 0−0 | 1–2 |
| Bylis (I) | 2–3 | Tirana (I) | 2–1 | 0–2 |

| 2 July 2020 | Kukësi | 0−0 | Teuta | Elbasan Arena, Elbasan |
| 20:45 CEST | | | | Referee: Eldorjan Hamiti |

| 15 July 2020 | Teuta | 2–1 | Kukësi | Niko Dovana Stadium, Durrës |
| 20:45 CEST | Kapllani 72'; Hoxha 83' | Report | Rroca 49' | Referee: Kreshnik Barjamaj |

Teuta advanced to the final.

| 2 July 2020 | Bylis | 2–1 | Tirana | Adush Muça Stadium, Ballsh |
| 17:45 CEST | Murataj 65', 78' | Report | Hasani 20' | Referee: Juxhin Xhaja |

| 15 July 2020 | Tirana | 2–0 | Bylis | Selman Stërmasi Stadium, Tirana |
| 17:30 CEST | Muçi 5'; Hoxhallari 25' | Report | | Referee: Klajdi Kola |

Tirana advanced to the final.

== Final ==
2 August 2020
20:00

| Teuta | 2−0 | Tirana |
|---|---|---|
| Hoxha 2'; Vila 78' |

Arena Kombëtare, Tirana
Referee: Eldorjan Hamiti
