= 2018–19 Albanian Cup =

Kupa e Shqipërisë

Tournament details
- Country: Albania
- Teams: 34

Final positions
- Champions: Kukësi
- Runners-up: Tirana

Tournament statistics
- Matches played: 63
- Goals scored: 185 (2.94 per match)
- Top goal scorer(s): Michael Ngoo (6 goals)

2018–19 Albanian Cup (Albanian: Kupa e Shqipërisë) was the sixty-seventh season of Albania's annual cup competition. Skënderbeu are the defending champions. Kukësi won the title for the second time in their history.

== Format ==
Ties are played in a two-legged format similar to those of European competitions. If the aggregate score is tied after both games, the team with the higher number of away goals advances. If the number of away goals is equal in both games, the match is decided by extra time and a penalty shoot-out, if necessary.

== Preliminary round ==
In order to reduce the number of participating teams for the first round to 32, a preliminary tournament is played. In contrast to the main tournament, the preliminary tournament is held as a single-leg knock-out competition. Matches were played on 2 September 2018 and involved the four best teams from the Albanian Second Division.

Team 1	Score	Team 2
Veleçiku (II)	3−0	Klosi (III)
Elbasani (II)	0−1	Oriku (II)

== First round ==
All 30 teams of the 2018–19 Kategoria Superiore and Kategoria e Parë entered in this round along with the two qualifiers from the preliminary round. The first legs were played on 12 September 2018 and the second legs took place on 26 September 2018.

Team 1	Agg.	Team 2	1st leg	2nd leg
Veleçiku (II)	0−7	Skënderbeu (I)	0−3	0−4
Vora (II)	0−5	Luftëtari (I)	0−4	0−1
Tërbuni (III)	0−5	Partizani (I)	0−1	0−4
Besa (II)	2−4	Kamza (I)	0−2	2−2
Burreli (II)	1−2	Vllaznia (II)	1−1	0−1
Korabi (II)	1−2	Kastrioti (I)	1−1	0−1
Dinamo Tirana (II)	0−1	Egnatia (II)	0−1	0−0
Besëlidhja (II)	5−1	Erzeni (II)	2−0	3−1
Oriku (II)	2−6	Kukësi (I)	1−2	1−4
Naftëtari (III)	0−14	Laçi (I)	0−5	0−9
Shkumbini (III)	0−2	Flamurtari (I)	0−1	0−1
Turbina (II)	2−7	Teuta (I)	0−3	2−4
Shënkolli (II)	3−4	Lushnja (II)	1−2	2−2
Iliria (II)	1−8	Tirana (I)	1−4	0−4
Tomori (II)	3−5	Bylis (II)	2−1	1−4
Pogradeci (II)	2−4	Apolonia (II)	0−1	2−3

12 September 2018	Veleçiku	0−3	Skënderbeu	Kompleksi Vellezërit Duli, Koplik
16:00 CEST			Gripshi 20'; Ajzeraj 58'; John 81'	Referee: Qazim Copa

26 September 2018	Skënderbeu	4−0	Veleçiku	Skënderbeu Stadium, Korçë
15:30 CEST	Guindo 2'; Hoxhaj 19'; Ziko 69'; Fili 85'			Referee: Eraldo Demiraj

Skënderbeu advanced to the second round.

12 September 2018	Vora	0−4	Luftëtari	Olimpiku Stadium, Yrshek
16:00 CEST			Hyseni 14'; Molla 42'; Cekaj 59'; Oshafi 83'	Referee: Ardit Merdanaj

26 September 2018	Luftëtari	1−0	Vora	Gjirokastra Stadium, Gjirokastër
15:30 CEST	Dunga 53'			Referee: Elton Hazizaj

Luftëtari advanced to the second round.

12 September 2018	Tërbuni	0−1	Partizani	Ismail Xhemali Stadium, Pukë
16:00 CEST			Çinari 6'	Referee: Elton Hazizaj

25 September 2018	Partizani	4−0	Tërbuni	Internacional Complex, Pezë Helmës
15:30 CEST	Çinari 16', 39'; Bardhi 29'; Hebaj 82'			Referee: Erik Kaso

Partizani advanced to the second round.

12 September 2018	Besa	0−2	Kamza	Besa Stadium, Kavajë
16:00 CEST			Frashëri 22'; Teqja 72'	Referee: Erik Kaso

26 September 2018	Kamza	2−2	Besa	QKS Kamëz, Kamëz
15:30 CEST	Kullolli 61' (o.g.); Peçi 72'		Deliu 32'; Cara 86'	Referee: Roxhers Muska

Kamza advanced to the second round.

12 September 2018	Burreli	1−1	Vllaznia	Liri Ballabani Stadium, Burrel
16:00 CEST	Djidjiwa 90'		Júnior Sílvio 48'	Referee: Mario Shabanaj

26 September 2018	Vllaznia	1−0	Burreli	Reshit Rusi Stadium, Shkodër
15:30 CEST	Zogaj 90'			Referee: Besnard Kaimi

Vllaznia advanced to the second round.

12 September 2018	Korabi	1−1	Kastrioti	Korabi Stadium, Peshkopi
16:00 CEST	Lika 13'		Gállego 10'	Referee: Klodian Shahini

26 September 2018	Kastrioti	1−0	Korabi	Redi Maloku Stadium, Fushë-Krujë
15:30 CEST	Marku 27'			Referee: Bekris Dragusha

Kastrioti advanced to the second round.

12 September 2018	Dinamo Tirana	0−1	Egnatia	Internacional Complex, Pezë Helmës
16:00 CEST			Broshka 63'	Referee: Egel Xhaferaj

26 September 2018	Egnatia	0−0	Dinamo Tirana	Egnatia Stadium, Rrogozhinë
15:30 CEST				Referee: Altin Stefi

Egnatia advanced to the second round.

12 September 2018	Besëlidhja	2−0	Erzeni	Brian Filipi Stadium, Lezhë
16:00 CEST	Fetaj 47'; Pasha 84'			Referee: Orlando Kuka

26 September 2018	Erzeni	1−3	Besëlidhja	Tofik Jashari Stadium, Shijak
15:30 CEST	Gjoka 30'		Thea 6'; Camara 35'; Miloti 79'	Referee: Laver Alla

Besëlidhja advanced to the second round.

12 September 2018	Oriku	1−2	Kukësi	Petro Ruci Stadium, Orikum
16:00 CEST	Kongjini 67'		Ethemi 6', 52'	Referee: Granit Sulko

26 September 2018	Kukësi	4−1	Oriku	Internacional Complex, Pezë Helmës
15:30 CEST	Harba 15'; Špehar 39', 55', 74'		Kongjini 80'	Referee: Klodjan Prenga

Kukësi advanced to the second round.

12 September 2018	Naftëtari	0−5	Laçi	Bashkim Sulejmani Stadium, Kuçovë
16:00 CEST			Toro 26'; Mersinaj 31', 81'; Smaçi 65'; Berisha 89'	Referee: Sokol Bebja

26 September 2018	Laçi	9−0	Naftëtari	QKS Kamëz, Kamëz
13:00 CEST	Prengaj 8'; Qose 14' (o.g.); Bushi 20'; A. Berisha 28', 48'; Hadroj 29', 37'; E. Berisha 30', 49'			Referee: Skerdi Greca

Laçi advanced to the second round.

12 September 2018	Shkumbini	0−1	Flamurtari	Egnatia Stadium, Rrogozhinë
16:00 CEST			Alves 90+3'	Referee: Geisi Velcani

26 September 2018	Flamurtari	1−0	Shkumbini	Fusha Stërvitore Flamurtari, Vlorë
15:30 CEST	Musta 90+3'			Referee: Mikele Dyrmishi

Flamurtari advanced to the second round.

12 September 2018	Turbina	0−3	Teuta	Nexhip Trungu Stadium, Cërrik
16:00 CEST			Peqini 40'; Kruja 57'; Shkalla 61'	Referee: Lesjan Dosti

26 September 2018	Teuta	4−2	Turbina	Olimpiku Stadium, Yrshek
15:30 CEST	Shkalla 6'; Traore 13'; Peqini 62'; Vila 90'		Shkreta 4'; Hasa 23'	Referee: Qazim Copa

Teuta advanced to the second round.

12 September 2018	Shënkolli	1−2	Lushnja	Shënkoll Stadium, Shënkoll
16:00 CEST	Përgjini 41'		Alcani 80' (o.g.); Ademi 86'	Referee: Xhulio Mema

26 September 2018	Lushnja	2−2	Shënkolli	Roza Haxhiu Stadium, Lushnjë
15:30 CEST	Zhuga 63'; Xhafa 84'		Obinwanne 10'; Përgjini 64'	Referee: Geisi Velcani

Lushnja advanced to the second round.

12 September 2018	Iliria	1−4	Tirana	Redi Maloku Stadium, Fushë-Krujë
16:00 CEST	Xhabrahimi 8'		Cobbinah 31', 48'; Turtulli 44'; Blazhevski 75'	Referee: Edvin Hoxha

25 September 2018	Tirana	4−0	Iliria	Skënder Halili Complex, Tirana
15:30 CEST	Sentamu 23', 28', 38'; Ngoo 80'			Referee: Xhulio Mema

Tirana advanced to the second round.

12 September 2018	Tomori	2−1	Bylis	Tomori Stadium, Berat
16:00 CEST	Dobra 2'; Shaqe 36'		Lickollari 85'	Referee: Indrit Myrtja

26 September 2018	Bylis	4−1	Tomori	Adush Muça Stadium, Ballsh
15:30 CEST	Ntephe 5'; Beji 34'; Koffi 39'; Offei 90'		Mujkic 85' (pen.)	Referee: Hermal Llapra

Bylis advanced to the second round.

12 September 2018	Pogradeci	0−1	Apolonia	Gjorgji Kyçyku Stadium, Pogradec
16:00 CEST			Mehmeti 66'	Referee: Blerim Ziri

26 September 2018	Apolonia	3−2	Pogradeci	Loni Papuçiu Stadium, Fier
15:30 CEST	Gjata 46', 65'; Hysenshahaj 88'		Lickollari 11'; Alimadhi 55'	Referee: Elidon Halo

Apolonia advanced to the second round.

== Second round ==
All the 16 qualified teams from the first round progressed to the second round. The first legs were played on 22 and 23 January 2019 and the second legs took place on 6 February 2019.

Team 1	Agg.	Team 2	1st leg	2nd leg
Besëlidhja (II)	1−5	Skënderbeu (I)	1−2	0−3
Egnatia (II)	0−3	Luftëtari (I)	0−3	0−0
Kastrioti (I)	2−7	Partizani (I)	2−4	0−3
Vllaznia (II)	2−2 (a)	Kamza (I)	2−1	0−1
Apolonia (II)	2−3	Kukësi (I)	2−1	0−2
Bylis (II)	2−3	Laçi (I)	2−0	0−3
Tirana (I)	2−1	Flamurtari (I)	2−0	0−1
Lushnja (II)	1−7	Teuta (I)	1−3	0−4

22 January 2019	Besëlidhja	1−2	Skënderbeu	Brian Filipi Stadium, Lezhë
14:00 CET	Camara 28'		John 10'; Gripshi 51'	Referee: Olsi Sokoli

6 February 2019	Skënderbeu	3−0	Besëlidhja	Skënderbeu Stadium, Korçë
13:30 CET	Vangjeli 57'; Abazi 72'; Krasniqi 84'			Referee: Elton Hazizaj

Skënderbeu advanced to the quarter finals.

23 January 2019	Egnatia	0−3	Luftëtari	Egnatia Stadium, Rrogozhinë
14:00 CET			Ramadani 50' (pen.); Dunga 55'; Rapo 83'	Referee: Indrit Myrtja

6 February 2019	Luftëtari	0−0	Egnatia	Gjirokastra Stadium, Gjirokastër
13:30 CET				Referee: Skerdi Grecaj

Luftëtari advanced to the quarter finals.

22 January 2019	Kastrioti	2−4	Partizani	Redi Maloku Stadium, Fushë-Krujë
14:00 CET	Vatnikaj 13'; Shehu 70'		Hebaj 30', 76'; Mensah 42'; Trashi 68'	Referee: Olsid Ferataj

6 February 2019	Partizani	3−0	Kastrioti	Selman Stërmasi Stadium, Tirana
13:30 CET	Hebaj 34'; Mensah 60'; Çinari 64'			Referee: Klodian Shahini

Partizani advanced to the quarter finals.

23 January 2019	Vllaznia	2−1	Kamza	Reshit Rusi Stadium, Shkodër
14:00 CET	Marku 58'; Júnior Rodrigues 77'		Mehmeti 18'	Referee: Orlando Kuka

6 February 2019	Kamza	1−0	Vllaznia	Kamëz Stadium, Kamëz
13:30 CET	Bitri 63'			Referee: Olsid Ferataj

Kamza advanced to the quarter finals.

23 January 2019	Apolonia	2−1	Kukësi	Loni Papuçiu Stadium (training ground), Fier
14:00 CET	Gjata 42'; Hysenshahaj 54'		Ethemi 59'	Referee: Blerim Ziri

6 February 2019	Kukësi	2−0	Apolonia	Internacional Complex, Pezë Helmës
13:30 CET	Shkurtaj 29'; Ethemi 79'			Referee: Hermal Llapra

Kukësi advanced to the quarter finals.

23 January 2019	Bylis	2−0	Laçi	Adush Muça Stadium, Ballsh
14:00 CET	Bytyçi 42'; Bajramaj 84'			Referee: Klodian Shahini

6 February 2019	Laçi	3−0	Bylis	Laçi Stadium, Laç
13:30 CET	Shtubina 9' (pen.); Toro 26'; Gjoni 44'			Referee: Kridens Meta

Laçi advanced to the quarter finals.

23 January 2019	Tirana	2−0	Flamurtari	Selman Stërmasi Stadium, Tirana
17:00 CET	Ngoo 35'; Hoxhallari 38'			Referee: Kreshnik Barjamaj

6 February 2019	Flamurtari	1−0	Tirana	Flamurtari Stadium, Vlorë
13:30 CET	Calé 49'			Referee: Laver Alla

Tirana advanced to the quarter finals.

23 January 2019	Lushnja	1−3	Teuta	Abdurrahman Roza Haxhiu Stadium, Lushnjë
14:00 CET	Gjyla 85'		Kallaku 30' (pen.); Vila 36'; Progni 51'	Referee: Kreshnik Cjapi

6 February 2019	Teuta	4−0	Lushnja	Tofik Jashari Stadium, Shijak
13:30 CET	Vecaj 30', 31'; Vila 50'; Amadu 60'			Referee: Orlando Kuka

Teuta advanced to the quarter finals.

== Quarter-finals ==
All eight qualified teams from the second round progressed to the quarter-finals. The first legs were played on 12 and 13 March 2019 and the second legs took place on 3 April 2019. Skënderbeu automatically qualified to the semi-finals after Kamza was banned from football competitions for the remaining of the season.

Team 1	Agg.	Team 2	1st leg	2nd leg
Kamza (I)	w/o	Skënderbeu (I)	–	–
Partizani (I)	1−3	Luftëtari (I)	1–2	0−1
Teuta (I)	2−3	Kukësi (I)	2−2	0−1
Tirana (I)	3−2	Laçi (I)	3−0	0−2

12 March 2019	Partizani	1−2	Luftëtari	Elbasan Arena, Elbasan
14:00 CET	Telushi 42'		Fili 54'; Hoxha 90'	Referee: Klodian Shahini

3 April 2019	Luftëtari	1−0	Partizani	Gjirokastra Stadium, Gjirokastër
14:00 CEST	Dunga 34' (pen.)

Luftëtari advanced to the semi finals.

12 March 2019	Teuta	2−2	Kukësi	Niko Dovana Stadium, Durrës
17:00 CET	Bušić 85'; Hakaj 90'		Reginaldo 45'; Shkurtaj 54'	Referee: Enea Jorgji

3 April 2019	Kukësi	1−0	Teuta	Elbasan Arena, Elbasan
17:00 CEST	Reginaldo 61'

Kukësi advanced to the semi finals.

13 March 2019	Tirana	3−0	Laçi	Selman Stërmasi Stadium, Tirana
17:00 CET	Ngoo 53', 65'; Hasani 73'			Referee: Laver Alla

3 April 2019	Laçi	2−0	Tirana	Laçi Stadium, Laç
14:00 CEST	Shtubina 29'; Çokaj 48'

Tirana advanced to the semi finals.

== Semi-finals ==
The first legs were played on 24 April and the second legs were played on 8 May 2019.

Team 1	Agg.	Team 2	1st leg	2nd leg
Kukësi (I)	5−2	Skënderbeu (I)	2−1	3−1
Luftëtari (I)	3−5	Tirana (I)	0−0	3−5

24 April 2019	Kukësi	2−1	Skënderbeu	Kamëz Stadium, Kamëz
16:00 CEST	Reginaldo 20'; Shkurtaj 55'		Bregu 61'

8 May 2019	Skënderbeu	1−3	Kukësi	Skënderbeu Stadium, Korçë
17:00 CEST	Bregu 47'		Reginaldo 19'; Abazi 42' (o.g.); Rama 58'

Kukësi advanced to the final.

24 April 2019	Luftëtari	0−0	Tirana	Gjirokastra Stadium, Gjirokastër
16:00 CEST

8 May 2019	Tirana	5−3	Luftëtari	Selman Stërmasi Stadium, Tirana
17:00 CEST	Daja 21'; Cobbinah 47' (pen.); Ngoo 53'; Sentamu 75', 86'		Fili 41'; Oshafi 79'; Dunga 90+4'

Tirana advanced to the final.

== Final ==
2 June 2019
19:00

Kukësi	2−1	Tirana
Shkurtaj 4'; Reginaldo 78'		Ngoo 66'

Elbasan Arena, Elbasan
Attendance: 1,500
Referee: Enea Jorgji
