= Vecaj =

Vecaj is a surname. Notable people with the surname include:

- Stivi Vecaj (born 1994), Albanian footballer
- Uendi Vecaj (born 1997), Albanian footballer
