= Reginaldo Faife =

Mozambican footballer

Reginaldo
Personal information
- Full name: Reginaldo Artur Faife
- Date of birth: 14 June 1990 (age 36)
- Place of birth: Quelimane, Mozambique
- Height: 1.72 m (5 ft 8 in)
- Position: Forward

Team information
- Current team: Kastrioti
- Number: 99

Senior career*
Years	Team	Apps	(Gls)
2009–2011	Maxaquene		
2011–2013	Liga Muçulmana		
2013–2015	Nacional	16	(2)
2015–2016	Santa Clara	43	(4)
2016–2017	Luftëtari Gjirokastër	32	(8)
2017–2018	Laçi	33	(19)
2018–2019	Kukësi	43	(20)
2019–2020	Shakhter Karagandy	14	(3)
2020	Kaisar	17	(2)
2021	Shkupi	14	(2)
2021	Akzhayik	4	(0)
2022	Dinamo Tirana	19	(0)
2023–	Kastrioti	16	(1)

International career^{‡}
2011–	Mozambique	35	(3)
- * Club domestic league appearances and goals as of 28 April 2023 ‡ National team caps and goals as of 28 April 2023

Reginaldo Artur Faife (born 14 June 1990), known simply as Reginaldo, is a Mozambican professional footballer who plays as a forward for Kategoria Superiore club Kastrioti.

== Club career ==
=== Luftëtari Gjirokastër ===
On 1 September 2016, Reginaldo joined Albanian club Luftëtari Gjirokastër by penning a one-year contract. During the course of 2016–17 season, Reginaldo made 32 league appearances, scoring 8 goals and providing 4 assists, and Luftëtari finished the season in a respectable 4th place. Following the expiration of his contract, Reginaldo left the club and become a free agent.

=== Laçi ===
On 1 August 2017, Reginaldo joined fellow Albanian Superliga side Laçi as a free agent. He missed the opening five championship matches due to injury, only returning to first-team matches in October, making his competitive debut on 16 October in the matchday 6 against Flamurtari Vlorë, scoring a penalty kick in a 1–1 draw at Kastrioti Stadium. Only five days later Reginaldo scored a brace in the 3–0 win over newbie Lushnja to help Laçi take 3rd place in the championship.

He started 2018 by netting his team's only goal in the 3–1 loss to Kamza. Then Reginaldo scored in both legs of 2017–18 Albanian Cup quarter-finals against his former team Luftëtari Gjirokastër as Laçi progressed to semi-finals 4–0 on aggregate; he refused to celebrate the goal scored at Luftëtari's home. Later on 10 March, Reginaldo scored his first Albanian Superliga hat-trick in the 4–2 home win versus Flamurtari Vlorë; the feat lifted his tally to 11 goals, breaking his previous record and also reaching double-figures for the first time in career. He also become the first Laçi player to score a hat-trick since Mate Dragičević in March 2011.

On 18 April, Reginaldo scored the decisive away goal in the 1–1 draw at Kukësi in the second leg of cup's semi-final to book Laçi's spot at the final once again. Later on 19 May, he scored inside 50 seconds in the match against Kamza to make it the fastest goal scored in Albanian Superliga for 2017–18 season; Laçi would win the match 2–1.

He left the club on 31 May, four days later losing the Albanian Cup final to Skënderbeu Korçë, finishing the season 21 goals between league and cup, with Laçi returning to European competitions once again. His 18 league goals set the record for the most goals scored by an Laçi player since Altin Çuko in 1995–96 season.

=== Kukësi ===
On 20 July 2018, Reginaldo agreed personal terms with Kukësi and signed a one-year contract, taking squad number 90 for the 2018–19 season. The striker made his official debut on 1 August by playing in the second half of 2018–19 UEFA Champions League second qualifying round second leg against Qarabağ which was lost 3–0. Despite the elimination, the team continued their European campaign in the 2018–19 UEFA Europa League, playing in the third qualifying round against Georgia's Torpedo Kutaisi. He initially did not travel with the team to play in the first leg at Ramaz Shengelia Stadium along with Valon Ethemi, Edis Maliqi and Faton Maloku after the Georgian authorities refused their visas. The issue was solved quickly and the players joined the team one day late. He was put as a starter by manager Armando Cungu, but left no mark in the match which was lost 5–2, missing several chances to score. He went on to apologize to the fans afterwards. Reginaldo got his first Kukësi goals in the second leg on 16 August, netting from two penalty kicks to give his team the 2–0 win at Elbasan Arena which was not enough to go through.

Reginaldo begun his domestic season three days later by making his debut in the opening matchday against his former team Laçi. He scored his first league goals for the club on 2 September in form of a hat-trick, his second in the Albanian Superliga, against Tirana for a 3–1 win at Loro Boriçi Stadium.

In the final matchday of the championship, Reginaldo scored two late goals against Kastrioti Krujë to give Kukësi a runner-up finish in league. By doing so, he won the Albanian Superliga Golden Boot with 13 goals in 32 appearances, beating his partner Vasil Shkurti by one goal. He also become only the second player in Kukësi history to win this award, after Pero Pejić.

=== Shakhter Karagandy ===
On 9 July 2019, Shakhter Karagandy announced the signing of Reginaldo from FK Kukësi.

=== Kaisar ===
On 5 February 2020, FC Kaisar announced the signing of Reginaldo.

=== Akzhayik ===
On 22 August 2021, FC Akzhayik announced the signing of Reginaldo.

== International career ==
Reginaldo has made three appearances with Mozambique national team. His competitive debut occurred on 24 March 2013 in the second qualifying round of 2014 FIFA World Cup against Guinea. That was his only appearance during the qualifying campaign as Mozambique finished Group G in the third place, failing to qualify.

== Career statistics ==
=== International ===
As of match played 16 November 2021

Appearances and goals by national team and year
National team	Year	Apps	Goals
Mozambique	2011	1	0
Mozambique	2012	0	0
Mozambique	2013	4	0
Mozambique	2014	9	1
Mozambique	2015	3	0
Mozambique	2016	3	0
Mozambique	2017	1	3
Mozambique	2018	4	2
Mozambique	2019	5	2
Mozambique	2020	1	0
Mozambique	2021	2	0
Total		33	3

=== International goals ===
Scores and results list Mozambique's goal tally first.

No.	Date	Venue	Opponent	Score	Result	Competition
1.	11 October 2014	Estádio do Zimpeto, Maputo, Mozambique	Cape Verde	2–0	2–0	2015 Africa Cup of Nations qualification
2.	8 September 2018	Estádio do Zimpeto, Maputo, Mozambique	Guinea-Bissau	2–1	2–2	2019 Africa Cup of Nations qualification
3.	18 November 2018	Estádio do Zimpeto, Maputo, Mozambique	Zambia	1–0	1–0	2019 Africa Cup of Nations qualification

== Honours ==
FK Kukësi

- Albanian Cup: 2018–19

Individual

- Albanian Superliga Golden Boot: 2018–19
