= Oumar Camara =

Oumar Camara may refer to:

- Oumar Camara (footballer, born 1992), Mauritanian football winger for Nantong Zhiyun
- Oumar Camara (footballer, born 1998), Guinean football midfielder for Limonest
- Oumar Camara (footballer, born 2007), French football winger for Vitória de Guimarães
