= Edis Maliqi =

Macedonian footballer

Personal information
- Full name: Edis Maliqi
- Date of birth: 4 May 1995 (age 31)
- Place of birth: Veles, Macedonia
- Height: 1.80 m (5 ft 11 in)
- Position: Defender

Team information
- Current team: Liria
- Number: 24

Youth career
- Rabotnički

Senior career*
Years	Team	Apps	(Gls)
2012–2013	Rabotnički	2	(0)
2015–2018	Shkupi	71	(0)
2018–2020	Kukësi	42	(0)
2020–2021	Lokomotiva	4	(0)
2021–2022	Dinamo Tirana	28	(0)
2022–2024	Struga	42	(0)
2024–2025	Malisheva	24	(0)
2026–	Liria	0	(0)

International career^{‡}
2012	Macedonia U18	2	(0)
2014	Macedonia U20	1	(0)
- * Club domestic league appearances and goals as of 26 June 2025 ‡ National team caps and goals as of 2 April 2014

Edis Maliqi (Macedonian: Едис Малиќи, born 4 May 1995) is a Macedonian professional footballer who plays as a defender for Liria.

== Club career ==
=== Kukësi ===
On 7 June 2018, Albanian club Kukësi announced to have signed Maliqi for an undisclosed fee. He took squad number 24, and was included in the squad for the UEFA Champions League campaign, where they faced Valletta in the first qualifying round; he was an unused substitute in both legs as Kukësi managed to progress on away goal rule. He made his competitive debut for the club on 25 July in the first leg of second qualifying round versus Qarabağ which ended in a goalless draw.

Maliqi also played in the returning leg at Tofiq Bahramov Republican Stadium, which was lost 3–0, solidifying his position in the starting lineup. Kukësi then continued in the UEFA Europa League, facing Georgia's Torpedo Kutaisi in the third qualifying round. Maliqi was included in the team to travel to Georgia for the first leg, but his visa and Valon Ethemi, Reginaldo and Faton Maloku's was denied the Georgian authorities. Maliqi eventually did not play, as Kukësi lost 5–2. He returned for the second leg and played full-90 minutes, and despite Kukësi winning 2–0 win at Elbasan Arena, they were eliminated on aggregate.

Maliqi made his Albanian Superliga appearance on 19 August by playing in the 1–1 draw versus Laçi in the opening matchday.

== International career ==
Maliqi begun his international career in September 2012 by playing in two friendlies versus Poland; the first match was won 1–0 while the second was lost with the same result. He could switch to Albania as he is an ethnic Albanian

== Career statistics ==
As of 3 September 2018

Club statistics
Club	Season	League			Cup		Europe		Other		Total	
Club	Season	Division	Apps	Goals	Apps	Goals	Apps	Goals	Apps	Goals	Apps	Goals
Rabotnički	2011–12	First League	1	0	0	0	—		—		1	0
Rabotnički	2012–13	First League	1	0	0	0	—		—		1	0
Rabotnički	Total		2	0	0	0	—		—		2	0
Shkupi	2015–16	First League	9	0	0	0	—		—		9	0
Shkupi	2016–17	First League	31	0	1	0	—		2 (Note: All appearance(s) in Relegation play-off)	0	34	0
Shkupi	2017–18	First League	31	0	0	0	—		—		31	0
Shkupi	Total		71	0	1	0	—		2	0	74	0
Kukësi	2018–19	Albanian Superliga	3	0	0	0	3 (Note: Two appearances in UEFA Champions League, one appearance in UEFA Europa League)	0	—		6	0
Kukësi	Total		3	0	0	0	3	0	—		6	0
Career total			76	0	1	0	3	0	2	0	82	0
