= Stivi Vecaj =

Albanian footballer

Personal information
- Date of birth: 29 January 1994 (age 32)
- Place of birth: Shkodër, Albania
- Height: 1.67 m (5 ft 6 in)
- Position: Midfielder

Youth career
- 2004–2012: Vllaznia

Senior career*
Years	Team	Apps	(Gls)
2012–2015	Vllaznia	9	(1)
2015–2016	Ada	22	(7)
2016	Vllaznia B		
2017	Tërbuni	6	(0)
- * Club domestic league appearances and goals

Stivi Vecaj (born 29 January 1994 in Shkodër) is an Albanian football player who most recently played for Tërbuni in the Albanian First Division.

== Personal life ==
He is a cousin of Uendi Vecaj, also a professional football player. In February 2016 they were both omitted from their squads due to a blood feud after a remote family member killed a member from another family.
