= Klejdi Rapo =

Albanian footballer

Personal information
- Full name: Klejdi Rapo
- Date of birth: 18 June 1994 (age 32)
- Place of birth: Korçë, Albania
- Position: Defensive midfielder

Team information
- Current team: Pogradeci

Youth career
- 2011–2013: Skënderbeu

Senior career*
Years	Team	Apps	(Gls)
2011–2013	Skënderbeu	0	(0)
2013–2014	Bilisht Sport	4	(0)
2014–2015	Pogradeci	6	(1)
2015–2016	Skënderbeu B	13	(4)
2016–2017	Devolli	21	(4)
2017	Maliqi	0	(0)
2017–2020	Devolli	71	(28)
2020–2021	Laçi	4	(0)
2021–2022	Maliqi	22	(1)
2022–2024	Pogradeci		
- * Club domestic league appearances and goals

Klejdi Rapo (born 18 June 1994) is an Albanian former professional footballer who plays as a midfielder for Albanian club KS Pogradeci.
