= Sedat Berisha =

Macedonian professional footballer

Personal information
- Full name: Sedat Berisha
- Date of birth: 3 September 1989 (age 37)
- Place of birth: Skopje, SFR Yugoslavia
- Height: 1.90 m (6 ft 3 in)
- Position: Centre back

Youth career
- Sloga Jugomagnat

Senior career*
Years	Team	Apps	(Gls)
2008–2010	Sloga Jugomagnat	19	(0)
2010–2013	Shkëndija	90	(3)
2013–2014	Metalurg Skopje	32	(1)
2014–2015	Shkëndija	24	(2)
2015	Bursaspor	0	(0)
2015–2016	Shkëndija	4	(0)
2016–2018	Shkupi	44	(1)
2018	Vllaznia	16	(1)
2018	Tirana	3	(0)
2018	Tirana B	1	(0)
2019–2020	Drita	14	(0)
2020	Struga	1	(0)
2020–2021	Trepça '89	33	(3)
2021–2024	Besa Dobërdoll	22	(0)

International career
2004–2006	Macedonia U17	5	(1)
2006–2010	Macedonia U21	3	(0)
2012–	Macedonia	1	(0)
- * Club domestic league appearances and goals

Sedat Berisha (born 3 September 1989) is a Macedonian former professional footballer who played as a centre back.

== Club career ==
=== Sloga Jugomagnat ===
Berisha broke into the Sloga Jugomagnat senior team in the 2009/2010 season earning 9 caps before being transferred to FK Milano Kumanovo in the winter break.

=== Milano Kumanovo ===
After the winter break, Berisha played 7 games for Milano. Berisha was influential on the pitch and a key player for Milano. However, Milano were relegated at the end of the 2009/2010 season. In the summer break, Tetovo based club KF Shkëndija bought him.

=== Shkëndija ===
In the 2010/2011 season, Berisha started in 30 matches and scored 1 goal for Shkëndija. At the end of the season, Berisha was established as one of the best defenders in Macedonia. During the winter break, Berisha trained with Hoffenheim before returning to Shkëndija when the season started again. After helping Shkëndija win the Macedonian Prva Liga and the Macedonian Super Cup, rumors circulated that Croatian club Hajduk Split were interested in signing the defender.

=== Bursaspor ===
In June 2015, Berisha agreed with Bursaspor.

== Honours ==
=== Club ===
KF Shkëndija

- Macedonian First League: 2011
- Macedonian Super Cup: 2010-11
