= Palatica =

Palatica Палатица Pallaticë
- Village
- Location within North Macedonia
- Coordinates: 42°00′N 21°03′E
- Country: North Macedonia
- Region: Polog
- Municipality: Želino

Population (2021)
  - Total: 1,432
- Time zone: UTC+1 (CET)
  - Summer (DST): UTC+2 (CEST)
- Car plates: TE
- Website: .

Palatica (Macedonian: Палатица, Albanian: Pallaticë) is a village in the municipality of Želino, North Macedonia.

== History ==
Palatica is attested in the 1467/68 Ottoman tax registry (defter) for the Nahiyah of Kalkandelen. The village had a total of 22 Christian households, 2 bachelors and 3 widows.

According to the 1467-68 Ottoman defter, Palatica (Polatica) exhibits Orthodox Slavic anthroponomy.

== Demographics ==
As of the 2021 census, Palatica had 1,432 residents with the following ethnic composition:

- Albanians 1,351
- Persons for whom data are taken from administrative sources 81

According to the 2002 census, the village had a total of 2,516 inhabitants. Ethnic groups in the village include:

- Albanians 2,501
- Macedonians 6
- Turks 1
- Others 8
