= Milan Djordjević =

Serbian footballer

Milan Đorđević
Personal information
- Full name: Milan Đorđević
- Date of birth: 30 January 1986 (age 40)
- Place of birth: Smederevska Palanka, SR Serbia, SFR Yugoslavia
- Height: 1.78 m (5 ft 10 in)
- Position: Forward

Senior career*
| Years | Team | Apps | (Gls) |
| 2004–2006 | Selevac | | |
| 2006–2007 | Mladenovac | 8 | (0) |
| 2007–2010 | Kovačevac | | |
| 2010 | BASK | | |
| 2011 | Mladenovac | | |
| 2011 | Kovačevac | | |
| 2012 | Besëlidhja Lezhë | 13 | (4) |
| 2012 | Selevac | | |
| 2013 | Mladi Radnik | 7 | (0) |
| 2013 | Kovačevac | | |
| 2014 | Mladenovac | 12 | (8) |
| 2014–2016 | Besëlidhja Lezhë | 50 | (13) |
| 2016 | Karađorđe Topola | 13 | (1) |
| 2017 | Šumadija Aranđelovac | | |
| 2017–2018 | OFK Beograd | 19 | (4) |
| 2018 | Dinamo 1945 | | |
| 2019 | Mladenovac | | |
| 2019–2021 | Besëlidhja Lezhë | 32 | (4) |
- * Club domestic league appearances and goals

Milan Đorđević (born 30 January 1986) is a Serbian retired footballer who played as a forward.

== Club career ==
He was a key player of Besëlidhja and he declared that he will stay in Lezhë to help the team promote to the highest division of the country and he said that he is now a fluent talker of Albanian language so he won't leave the city.
