= Shaqir Haruni =

Albanian footballer

Personal information
- Date of birth: 27 May 1999 (age 27)
- Place of birth: Vlorë, Albania
- Position: Winger

Team information
- Current team: Oriku
- Number: 22

Youth career
- –2017: Flamurtari

Senior career*
Years	Team	Apps	(Gls)
2017–2020	Flamurtari	35	(2)
2017–2018	→ Korabi (loan)	5	(0)
2020–	Oriku	10	(0)
- * Club domestic league appearances and goals as of 23:25, 7 August 2021 (UTC)

Shaqir Haruni (born 27 May 1999) is an Albanian footballer who plays as a winger for KF Oriku in the Kategoria e Dytë.

== Career ==
=== Flamurtari ===
A graduate of the club's youth academy, Haruni made his league debut for the club on 23 May 2018, coming on as a halftime substitute for Muarem Muarem in a 2–2 away draw with Kukësi.
