= Vincent Atinga =

Ghanaian footballer

Personal information
- Date of birth: 30 October 1993 (age 33)
- Place of birth: Accra, Ghana
- Height: 1.90 m (6 ft 3 in)
- Position: Centre back

Team information
- Current team: Bibiani Gold Stars SC
- Number: 21

Youth career
- Unistar Soccer Academy

Senior career*
Years	Team	Apps	(Gls)
2012–2014	Ebusua Dwarfs	28	(0)
2015–2017	Hearts of Oak	39	(5)
2018–2019	Tirana	16	(0)
2019	Al Qadsia		
2019–	Al-Shabab		
2020 - 2023	Medeama SC	74	(21)
2023 -	Bibiani Gold Stars SC	20	(0)

International career^{‡}
- Ghana U20
- Ghana U23
2017–	Ghana	7	(2)
- * Club domestic league appearances and goals as of 11:44, 20 July 2018 (UTC) ‡ National team caps and goals as of 11:44, 20 July 2018 (UTC)

Vincent Atingah Adae (born 30 October 1993) is a Ghanaian footballer who currently plays as a defender for Ghana premier League side Bibiani Gold Stars F.C.

== Career statistics ==
=== Club ===
As of 20 July 2018.

Club	Season	League			Cup		Continental		Other		Total	
Club	Season	Division	Apps	Goals	Apps	Goals	Apps	Goals	Apps	Goals	Apps	Goals
Ebusua Dwarfs	2012–13	Ghana Premier League	28	0	0	0	–		0	0	28	0
Hearts of Oak	2016	Ghana Premier League	12	0	0	0	–		0	0	12	0
Hearts of Oak	2017	Ghana Premier League	27	5	0	0	–		0	0	27	5
Hearts of Oak	Total		39	5	0	0	0	0	0	0	39	5
KF Tirana	2018–19	Albanian Superliga	0	0	0	0	–		0	0	0	0
Career total			67	5	0	0	0	0	0	0	67	5

=== International ===
As of matches played 20 July 2018.

National team	Year	Apps	Goals
Ghana	2017	7	2
Ghana	2018	0	0
Total		7	2

=== International goals ===
Scores and results list Ghana's goal tally first.

No	Date	Venue	Opponent	Score	Result	Competition
1.	9 September 2017	Cape Coast Sports Stadium, Cape Coast, Ghana	Gambia	1–0	1–0	2017 WAFU Cup of Nations
2.	24 September 2017	Cape Coast Sports Stadium, Cape Coast, Ghana	Nigeria	2–0	4–1	2017 WAFU Cup of Nations
