= Ksement Mehmeti =

Albanian footballer

Personal information
- Date of birth: 31 October 1998 (age 28)
- Place of birth: Fier, Albania
- Position: Midfielder

Youth career
- 2011–2012: Fieri
- 2012–2013: Apollonia 98
- 2013–2017: Apolonia

Senior career*
Years	Team	Apps	(Gls)
2017–2021	Apolonia	91	(4)
- * Club domestic league appearances and goals

Ksement Mehmeti (born 31 October 1998) is an Albanian former professional footballer who played as a midfielder.
