= Oumar Camara (footballer, born 1998) =

Guinean footballer

Personal information
- Full name: Oumar Tourad Camara
- Date of birth: 1 September 1998 (age 28)
- Place of birth: Port Kamsar, Guinea
- Position: Midfielder

Team information
- Current team: Limonest

Senior career*
Years	Team	Apps	(Gls)
2016–2017	Besa Kavajë	11	(1)
2017–2020	Besëlidhja Lezhë	57	(18)
2019	→ Kukësi (loan)	2	(0)
2021–2024	Rhône Vallées		
2024–	Limonest	9	(1)
- * Club domestic league appearances and goals as of 7 December 2024

Oumar Tourad Camara (born 1 September 1998) is a Guinean footballer who plays as a midfielder for French Championnat National 3 club Limonest.

== Career statistics ==
=== Club ===
As of 10 January 2019.

Club	Season	League			Cup		Other		Total	
Club	Season	Division	Apps	Goals	Apps	Goals	Apps	Goals	Apps	Goals
Besa Kavajë	2016–17	Albanian First Division	11	1	1 (Note: Appearances in the Albanian Cup)	0	0	0	12	1
Besëlidhja Lezhë	2016–17	Albanian First Division	11	2	2	0	0	0	13	2
Besëlidhja Lezhë	2017–18	Albanian First Division	22	7	4	1	0	0	26	8
Besëlidhja Lezhë	2018–19	Albanian First Division	13	6	2	1	0	0	15	7
Besëlidhja Lezhë	Total		46	15	9	2	0	0	55	17
Career total			57	16	9	2	0	0	66	18
