= Vasil Shkurti =

Albanian footballer

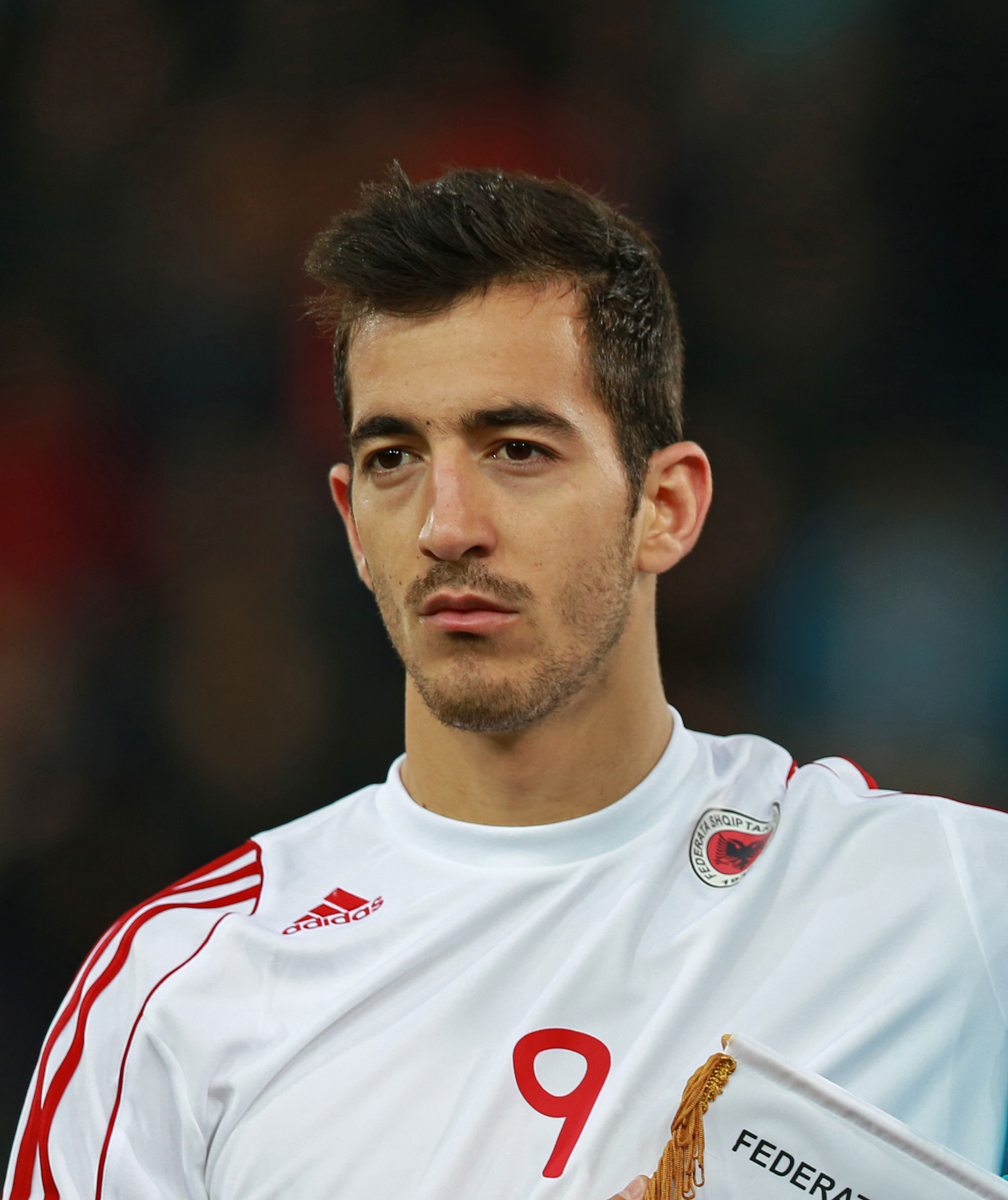
- Shkurti with the Albania under-21s in 2014

Personal information
- Full name: Vassilis Skourtis-Shkurtaj
- Date of birth: 27 February 1992 (age 34)
- Place of birth: Chania, Greece
- Height: 1.90 m (6 ft 3 in)
- Position: Forward

Team information
- Current team: AEZ Zakakiou
- Number: 9

Youth career
- 2001–2006: Chania
- 2006–2009: Ajax
- 2009–2010: Olympiacos
- 2010: Lazio

Senior career*
Years	Team	Apps	(Gls)
2010–2011	Panionios	3	(0)
2011	→ Thrasyvoulos (loan)	7	(0)
2011	Platanias	0	(0)
2012	Vilaverdense	14	(3)
2012–2013	Tondela	13	(2)
2013–2014	Roda JC	8	(1)
2014	Niki Volos	10	(4)
2015	Asteras Tripolis	9	(1)
2016	Skoda Xanthi	12	(0)
2016–2017	Aris Limassol	19	(4)
2017–2018	Luftëtari	33	(13)
2019–2020	Kukësi	46	(28)
2020–2021	Jiangxi Liansheng	9	(1)
2022	Kukësi	9	(1)
2022–2023	Laçi	26	(6)
2023–2024	Polis Chrysochous	7	(2)
2023–2025	Flamurtari	22	(7)
2025–	AEZ Zakakiou	22	(2)

International career
2010–2011	Albania U19	2	(1)
2011–2014	Albania U21	13	(2)
- * Club domestic league appearances and goals as of 3 May 2026

Vasil Shkurti (born Vassilis Skourtis-Shkurtaj; 27 February 1992) is an Albanian professional footballer who plays as a forward for AEZ Zakakiou.

== Club career ==
=== Early years ===
Born in Chania, Greece, to an ethnic Albanian family. Shkurti played youth football for four clubs, including Ajax, Olympiacos and Lazio. He arrived at the latter in January 2010 as compatriot Igli Tare acted as the club's director of football.

In the 2010–11 season, Shkurti made his senior debut, representing Panionios in his country of adoption but also being loaned by the Super League side to Thrasyvoulos in January 2011. Roughly one year later, he moved to Portugal with lowly Vilaverdense, and the following campaign he signed with Tondela in that nation's Segunda Liga, led by former Benfica and Portugal great Vítor Paneira.

Shkurti did not settle with any team in the following years, representing in quick succession Roda (Dutch Eredivisie), Niki Volos, Asteras Tripolis and Skoda Xanthi (all in the Greek top level) and Aris Limassol from the Cypriot First Division.

=== Luftëtari ===
On 8 September 2017, Shkurti joined Albanian Superliga side Luftëtari on a one-year contract– as the transfer was done after the deadline, he remained ineligible to play for the club until the next transfer window. He made his competitive debut on 31 January 2018 in a 3–0 away loss against Laçi for the first leg of the quarter-finals of the Albanian Cup, and first appeared in the league four days later in the goalless draw to Lushnja.

Shkurti scored his first goals on 10 February 2018, in the 3–2 win at Teuta Durrës. On 1 March, he netted the lone goal at Flamurtari to help the team climb to sixth place, also giving them the first win at Vlorë in 40 years.

=== Kukësi ===
On 3 January 2019, Shkurti moved to Kukësi on a two-year deal. He was presented the following day, alongside his former teammate Eduart Rroca.

== Career statistics ==
As of 26 May 2022

Appearances and goals by club, season and competition
Club	Season	League			National cup		Continental		Other		Total	
Club	Season	Division	Apps	Goals	Apps	Goals	Apps	Goals	Apps	Goals	Apps	Goals
Panionios	2010–11	Super League Greece	3	0	0	0	—		—		3	0
Thrasyvoulos (loan)	2010–11	Football League	7	0	0	0	—		—		7	0
Platanias	2011–12	Football League	0	0	0	0	—		—		0	0
Vilaverdense	2011–12	Terceira Divisão	14	3	0	0	—		—		14	3
Tondela	2012–13	Segunda Liga	13	2	4	0	—		—		17	2
Roda	2013–14	Eredivisie	8	1	1	0	—		—		9	1
Niki Volos	2014–15	Super League Greece	10	4	1	0	—		—		11	4
Asteras Tripolis	2014–15	Super League Greece	4	0	0	0	—		—		4	0
Asteras Tripolis	2015–16	Super League Greece	5	1	2	2	2	0	—		9	3
Asteras Tripolis	Total		9	1	2	2	2	0	0	0	13	3
Skoda Xanthi	2015–16	Super League Greece	12	0	0	0	—		—		12	0
Aris Limassol	2016–17	Cypriot First Division	18	4	1	0	—		—		16	4
Aris Limassol	2017–18	Cypriot First Division	1	0	0	0	—		—		1	0
Aris Limassol	Total		19	4	1	0	0	0	0	0	20	4
Luftëtari	2017–18	Albanian Superliga	15	6	1	0	—		—		16	6
Luftëtari	2018–19	Albanian Superliga	18	7	0	0	2	0	—		7	4
Luftëtari	Total		33	13	1	0	2	0	0	0	36	13
Kukësi	2018–19	Albanian Superliga	16	5	7	4	0	0	—		23	9
Kukësi	2019–20	Albanian Superliga	30	22	4	1	2	0	1 (Note: Appearances in Albanian Supercup)	0	37	23
Kukësi	Total		46	27	11	5	2	0	1	0	60	32
Jiangxi Liansheng	2020	China League One	1	0	—		—		2 (Note: Appearances in China League One relegation play-offs)	0	3	0
Jiangxi Liansheng	2021	China League One	8	1	—		—		—		8	1
Jiangxi Liansheng	Total		9	1	0	0	0	0	2	0	11	1
Kukësi	2021–22	Albanian Superliga	9	1	0	0	—		—		9	1
Laçi	2022–23	Albanian Superliga	0	0	0	0	—		—		9	1
Career total			192	57	21	7	6	0	3	0	222	64

== Honours ==
Kukësi

- Albanian Cup: 2018–19
