= Valon Ethemi =

Macedonian footballer (born 1997)

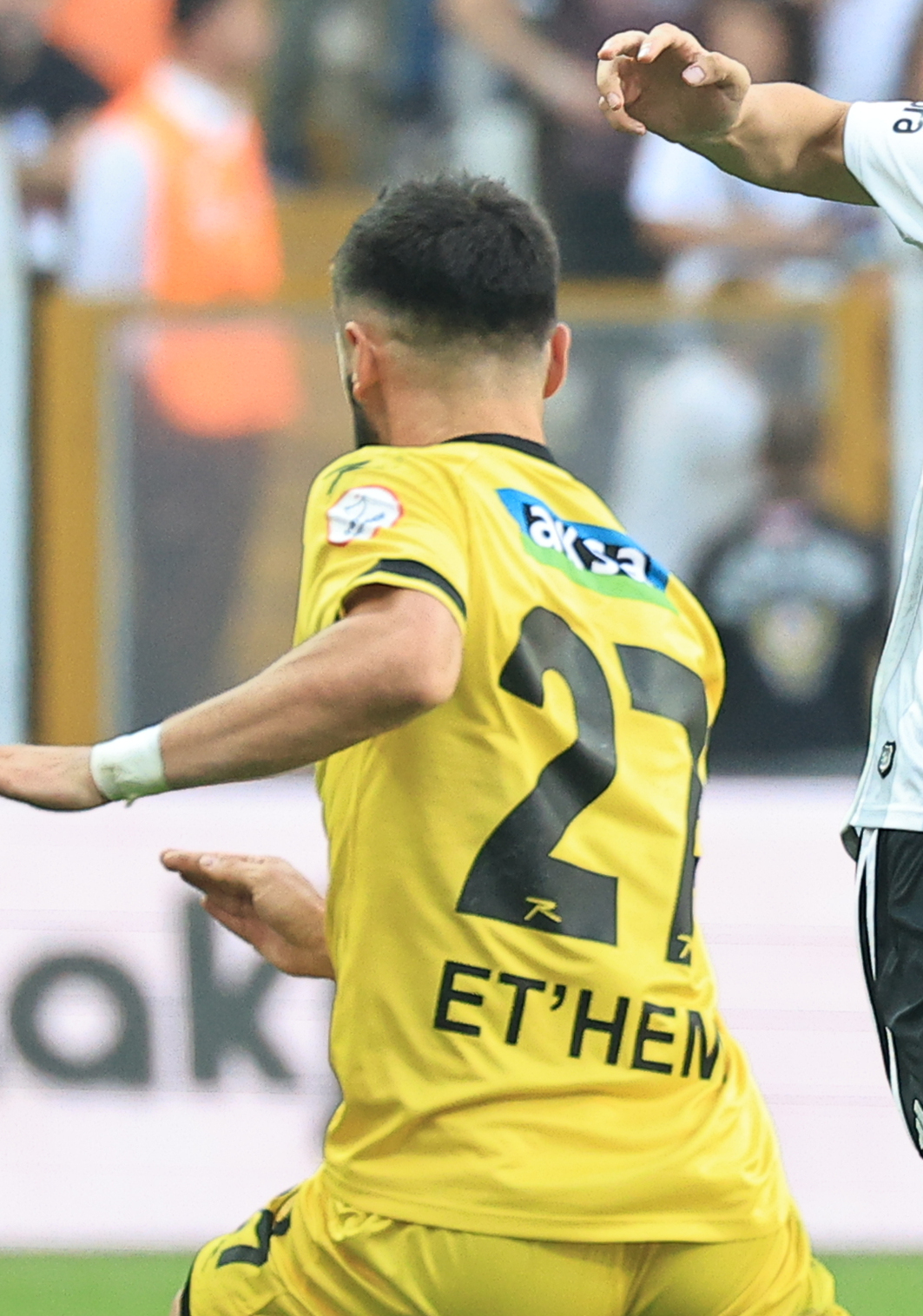
- Ethemi in 2023

Personal information
- Date of birth: 3 October 1997 (age 29)
- Place of birth: Palatica, North Macedonia
- Height: 1.79 m (5 ft 10 in)
- Position: Midfielder

Team information
- Current team: Sivasspor
- Number: 27

Youth career
- 2010–2015: Renova
- 2015–2016: Dinamo Tirana

Senior career*
| Years | Team | Apps | (Gls) |
| 2016–2017 | Adriatiku Mamurras | 22 | (4) |
| 2017–2021 | Kukësi | 95 | (9) |
| 2021–2025 | İstanbulspor | 103 | (22) |
| 2024 | → Konyaspor (loan) | 15 | (1) |
| 2025–2026 | Iğdır | 14 | (0) |
| 2025–2026 | → Sivasspor (loan) | 31 | (7) |
| 2026– | Sivasspor | 12 | (2) |

International career^{‡}
| 2018 | Albania U21 | 1 | (0) |
| 2022– | North Macedonia | 4 | (0) |
- * Club domestic league appearances and goals as of 24 October 2026 ‡ National team caps and goals as of 12 November 2023

Valon Ethemi (Macedonian: Валон Етеми; born 3 October 1997) is a Macedonian professional footballer who plays as a midfielder for Turkish TFF 1. Lig club Sivasspor. A former youth international for Albania, he plays for the North Macedonia national team.

== Club career ==
=== Early career ===
Ethemi was born in Palatica, Želino Municipality to ethnic Albanian parents but later moved to Albania where he joined the Dinamo Tirana academy as a 17-year-old, where he remained for one year before joining professional side Adriatiku Mamurras in the Albanian First Division, the second tier of football in Albania. He featured in 22 league games for the club during the 2016–17 campaign, scoring 4 goals in the process which landed him a move to Albanian Superliga champions Kukësi.

=== Kukësi ===
He officially joined Kukësi on 28 August 2017, penning a three-year contract and receiving squad number 27. Later on 6 September, he was on the bench for his side's 2017 Albanian Supercup loss to Tirana. He played his first Albanian Superliga match three days later on the opening league game of the season, coming on as a 76th-minute substitute for Ndriçim Shtubina in the 1–0 home win over newly promoted Kamza. He scored his first league goal for the club on 16 October 2017 in a 4–2 home victory over KF Teuta Durrës. His goal, scored in the 31st minute, made the score 2–0 in favor of Kukësi. He was later subbed out, being replaced by Rauf Aliyev in the 78th minute.

=== İstanbulspor ===
Ethemi helped İstanbulspor achieve promotion in the 2021–22 season for the first time in 17 years. He started in İstanbulspor return to the Süper Lig in a 2–0 season opening loss to Trabzonspor on 5 August 2022.

== International career ==
On 28 May 2018 Ethemi made his debut with Albania U21 in a friendly match against Bosnia and Herzegovina U21 after being named in the starting line-up.

On 12 June 2022 Ethemi made his debut with North Macedonia in a match of UEFA Nations League against Gibraltar.

== Career statistics ==
As of match played 10 January 2024

| Club | Season | League | | | Cup | | Continental | | Other | | Total | |
| Club | Season | Division | Apps | Goals | Apps | Goals | Apps | Goals | Apps | Goals | Apps | Goals |
|---|---|---|---|---|---|---|---|---|---|---|---|---|
| Adriatiku Mamurras | 2016–17 | Albanian First Division | 22 | 4 | 0 | 0 | — | | — | | 22 | 4 |
| Kukësi | 2017–18 | Albanian Superliga | 33 | 2 | 7 | 1 | — | | 0 | 0 | 40 | 3 |
| Kukësi | 2018–19 | Kategoria Superiore | 31 | 1 | 8 | 4 | 4 (Note: Three appearances in the UEFA Champions League, One appearance in the UEFA Europa League) | 0 | — | | 43 | 5 |
| Kukësi | 2019–20 | Kategoria Superiore | 31 | 6 | 4 | 0 | 2 (Note: Appearances in the UEFA Europa League) | 1 | 1 (Note: Appearance in the Albanian Supercup) | 0 | 38 | 7 |
| Kukësi | Total | | 95 | 9 | 19 | 5 | 6 | 1 | 1 | 0 | 121 | 15 |
| İstanbulspor | 2020–21 | TFF First League | 16 | 1 | 0 | 0 | — | | 2 (Note: Appearances in the 2020–21 TFF First League promotion play-offs) | 0 | 18 | 1 |
| İstanbulspor | 2021–22 | TFF First League | 35 | 6 | 2 | 0 | — | | 3 (Note: Appearances in the 2021–22 TFF First League promotion play-offs) | 1 | 40 | 7 |
| İstanbulspor | 2022–23 | Süper Lig | 30 | 12 | 2 | 0 | — | | — | | 32 | 12 |
| İstanbulspor | 2023–24 | Süper Lig | 14 | 1 | 0 | 0 | — | | — | | 14 | 1 |
| İstanbulspor | Total | | 95 | 20 | 4 | 0 | 0 | 0 | 5 | 1 | 104 | 21 |
| Career total | | | 212 | 33 | 23 | 5 | 6 | 1 | 6 | 1 | 247 | 40 |
