= Uendi Vecaj =

Albanian footballer

Personal information
- Date of birth: 18 February 1997 (age 29)
- Place of birth: Shkodër, Albania
- Height: 1.70 m (5 ft 7 in)
- Position: Right winger

Team information
- Current team: Skënderbeu
- Number: 97

Youth career
- 2010–2012: Vraka
- 2012–2015: Vllaznia Shkodër

Senior career*
Years	Team	Apps	(Gls)
2015–2017	Vllaznia	25	(0)
2017	Vllaznia B	1	(0)
2017–2018	Dinamo Zagreb II	3	(0)
2018–2019	Teuta Durrës	29	(2)
2020	Laçi	6	(0)
2020–2021	Burreli	19	(2)
2021–	Skënderbeu	13	(1)

International career
2016	Albania U-21	1	(0)
- * Club domestic league appearances and goals as of 19 May 2023

Uendi Vecaj (born 18 February 1997) is an Albanian professional footballer who plays as a right winger for Skënderbeu.

== Club career ==
On 31 August 2017 Vecaj completed a transfer to Croatian First Football League giants GNK Dinamo Zagreb.

== International career ==
He received his first international level call up to the Albania national under-21 team by coach Redi Jupi for the 2017 UEFA European Under-21 Championship qualification closing match against Israel U21 on 10 October 2016. He debuted for the under-21 national side against Israel U21 playing as a starter until half time where he was replaced by Ardit Hoxhaj in a 4–0 loss.

== Career statistics ==
=== Club ===
As of 18 November 2017

Club statistics
Club	Season	League			Cup		Europe (Note: Including continental competitions, such as UEFA Champions League and UEFA Europa League)		Other		Total	
Club	Season	Division	Apps	Goals	Apps	Goals	Apps	Goals	Apps	Goals	Apps	Goals
Vllaznia Shkodër	2015–16	Albanian Superliga	11	0	—		—		—		11	0
Vllaznia Shkodër	2016–17	Albanian Superliga	14	0	3	0	—		—		17	0
Vllaznia Shkodër	Total		25	0	3	0	—		—		28	0
Vllaznia Shkodër B	2016–17	Albanian Second Division	1	0	—		—		—		1	0
Dinamo Zagreb II	2017–18	Croatian Second League	3	0	—		—		—		3	0
Career total			29	0	3	0	—		—		32	0

== Personal life ==
He is a cousin of Stivi Vecaj, also a football player. In February 2016 they were both omitted from their squads due to a blood feud after a remote family member killed a member from another family.
