= 2008–09 FK Dinamo Tirana season =

Dinamo Tirana
2008–09 season
- Chairman: (Albania) Besnik Sulaj
- Manager: (Croatia) Zlatko Dalić (until 5 February 2009) (Albania) Shkëlqim Muça
- Kategoria Superiore: 3rd
- Kupa e Shqipërisë: Quarter finals
- Albanian Supercup: Winners
- Champions League: 1st Qualifying Round
- Top goalscorer: League: Sebino Plaku (18); All: Sebino Plaku (20)

During the 2008-09 football season, Dinamo will play its 58th Kategoria Superiore season in the club's existence.

== Club ==
=== Management ===
Position	Staff
Head coach	(Albania) Shkëlqim Muça
Assistant coach	(Albania) Artan Mergjyshi
Goalkeeping coaches	(Albania) Ilir Bozhiqi
Technical Director	(Albania) Ilir Daja
Fitness coaches	(Croatia) Frano Leko
Club doctor	(Albania) Nderim Rexha

=== Kit ===
Supplier: Sportika
Sponsor(s): Alpet

Home	Away

=== Other information ===
President	(Albania) Besnik Sulaj
Vice-president	(Albania) Avni Braçe
Ground (capacity and dimensions)	Selman Stërmasi (12, 955 / 105m x 68m)

== Squad ==
As of August 31, 2008.

=== First team ===
Note: Flags indicate national team as defined under FIFA eligibility rules; some limited exceptions apply. Players may hold more than one non-FIFA nationality.

No.	Pos.	Nation	Player
1	GK	ALB	Elvis Kotorri
2	DF	ALB	Elvis Sina
3	DF	SRB	Danilo Nikolić
4	MF	ALB	Asion Daja
5	DF	ALB	Arjan Pisha (captain)
6	DF	ALB	Julian Brahja
7	MF	ALB	Nertil Ferraj
8	FW	BIH	Nedim Halilović
10	MF	CRO	Pëllumb Jusufi
11	FW	ALB	Sebino Plaku
12	GK	ALB	Alban Hoxha
13	MF	ALB	Artion Poci (vice-captain)
14	MF	ALB	Igli Allmuça
15	DF	ALB	Roland Peqini
16	FW	ALB	Fatjon Sefa
17	FW	ALB	Rigels Nezaj
19	MF	ALB	Elis Bakaj
20	DF	ALB	Klevis Bejtja
21	MF	ALB	Hetlem Capja

No.	Pos.	Nation	Player
22	DF	CRO	Goran Granić
23	DF	SEN	Albaye Papa Diop
24	GK	ALB	Sulejman Hoxha
25	FW	CRO	Frane Petričević
99	FW	ARG	Rubén Cecco
—	GK	ARG	Daniel Alejandro Bertoya
—	DF	ARG	Alejandro Palladino
—	DF	ALB	Eradi Mertiri
—	DF	CRO	Dario Bodrušić
—	MF	ALB	Julian Ahmataj
—	MF	ARG	Agustín González Tapia
—	MF	ALB	Ilirjan Çaushaj
—	MF	ALB	Andi Hasa
—	MF	ALB	Klodian Sulollari
—	FW	ALB	Gers Delia
—	FW	ARG	Mario Antonio Romero
—	FW	ARG	Cristian Andres Campozano
—	FW	ALB	Daniel Xhafa
—	FW	ALB	Rigels Nezaj

=== List of 2008-09 transfers ===
as of 31 August 2008

==== In ====
Note: Flags indicate national team as defined under FIFA eligibility rules; some limited exceptions apply. Players may hold more than one non-FIFA nationality.

No.	Pos.	Nation	Player
—	DF	ALB	Elvis Sina (from SK Tirana)
—	MF	ALB	Hetlem Capja (from SK Tirana)
—	DF	ALB	Julian Brahja (from Kastrioti)
—	MF	ALB	Fatjon Sefa (from KS Lushnja)
—	MF	ARG	Agustino Tapia Gonzalez
—	FW	ARG	Cristian Campozano

No.	Pos.	Nation	Player
—	FW	CRO	Frane Petričević
—	MF	CRO	Pëllumb Jusufi
—	FW	ALB	Sebino Plaku (on loan from HamKam)
—	DF	SRB	Danilo Nikolić
—	FW	BIH	Nedim Halilovic

==== Out ====
Note: Flags indicate national team as defined under FIFA eligibility rules; some limited exceptions apply. Players may hold more than one non-FIFA nationality.

No.	Pos.	Nation	Player
—	MF	CRO	Goran Vinčetić (to Sc Weiz)
—	DF	CRO	Dario Bodrušić (to NK Rijeka)
—	DF	NGA	Abraham Alechenwu (to KF Tirana)
—	MF	ALB	Bekim Kuli (to Besa)
—	DF	ALB	Ditmar Bicaj (to Belasitsa)
—	MF	ALB	Sokol Ishka (to Besa)

No.	Pos.	Nation	Player
—	FW	CRO	Pero Pejić (to Kapfenberger SV)
—	FW	ALB	Eleandro Pema (to Flamurtari Vlore)
—	MF	ALB	Ilirian Caushaj (to Flamurtari Vlore)
—	MF	ARG	Agustino Tapia Gonzalez
—	FW	ARG	Cristian Campozano

== Player statistics ==
No.	Pos	Nat	Player	Total		Kategoria superiore		Kupa e shqipërisë		Albanian Supercup		UEFA Champions League	
No.	Pos	Nat	Player	Apps	Goals	Apps	Goals	Apps	Goals	Apps	Goals	Apps	Goals
1	GK	(Albania) ALB	Elvis Kotorri	10	-7	8	-5	0	0	1	0	1	-2
2	DF	(Albania) ALB	Elvis Sina	10	0	7	0	0	0	1	0	2	0
3	DF	(Serbia) SRB	Danilo Nikolić	6	0	6	0	0	0	0	0	0	0
4	MF	(Albania) ALB	Asion Daja	2	0	2	0	0	0	0	0	0	0
5	DF	(Albania) ALB	Arjan Pisha	11	0	8	0	0	0	1	0	2	0
6	DF	(Albania) ALB	Julian Brahja	4	0	3	0	0	0	1	0	0	0
7	MF	(Albania) ALB	Nertil Ferraj	11	0	8	0	0	0	1	0	2	0
8	DF	(Bosnia and Herzegovina) BIH	Nedim Halilović	6	0	6	0	0	0	0	0	0	0
10	MF	(Croatia) CRO	Pëllumb Jusufi	9	1	8	0	0	0	1	1	0	0
11	FW	(Albania) ALB	Sebino Plaku	9	2	8	2	0	0	1	0	0	0
12	GK	(Albania) ALB	Alban Hoxha	0	0	0	0	0	0	0	0	0	0
13	MF	(Albania) ALB	Artion Poci	11	0	8	0	0	0	1	0	2	0
14	MF	(Albania) ALB	Igli Allmuça	11	1	8	1	0	0	1	0	2	0
15	DF	(Albania) ALB	Roland Peqini	0	0	0	0	0	0	0	0	0	0
16	FW	(Albania) ALB	Fatjon Sefa	6	0	4	0	0	0	1	0	1	0
17	FW	(Albania) ALB	Rigels Nezaj	0	0	0	0	0	0	0	0	0	0
20	DF	(Albania) ALB	Klevis Bejtja	0	0	0	0	0	0	0	0	0	0
21	MF	(Albania) ALB	Hetlem Capja	10	0	8	0	0	0	1	0	1	0
22	DF	(Croatia) CRO	Goran Granić	10	0	8	0	0	0	1	0	1	0
23	DF	(Senegal) SEN	Albaye Papa Diop	8	0	5	0	0	0	1	0	2	0
24	GK	(Albania) ALB	Sulejman Hoxha	0	0	0	0	0	0	0	0	0	0
25	FW	(Croatia) CRO	Frane Petričević	9	2	8	1	0	0	1	1	0	0
	MF	(Albania) ALB	Ilirian Caushaj	2	0	0	0	0	0	0	0	2	0
	FW	(Albania) ALB	Daniel Xhafaj	2	1	0	0	0	0	0	0	2	1
	DF	(Albania) ALB	Julian Ahmataj	1	0	0	0	0	0	0	0	1	0
	MF	(Argentina) ARG	Agustino Tapia Gonzalez	2	0	0	0	0	0	0	0	2	0
	GK	(Argentina) ARG	Daniel Alejandro Bertoya	1	-2	0	0	0	0	0	0	1	-2
	DF	(Argentina) ARG	Hours Alejandro Palladino	1	0	0	0	0	0	0	0	1	0
	FW	(Argentina) ARG	Cristian Campozano	1	0	0	0	0	0	0	0	1	0

== Competitions ==
=== Overall ===
Competition	Started round	Final position	Final Round	First match	Last match
Kategoria Superiore	Round 5	3rd	Round 33	August 24, 2008	May 24, 2009
Kupa e shqiperise	Round of 16	—	—	TBD	
Champions League	First qualifying round	First qualifying round	First qualifying round	July 15, 2008	July 23, 2008

=== Albanian Supercup ===
17 August 2008 Final	Dinamo Tirana	2–0	Vllaznia	Tirana
20:00 CET	Petričević 17'; Jusufi 78'	Report		Stadium: Qemal Stafa Stadium; Attendance: 500; Referee: Erjon Dobi

=== Kategoria Superiore ===
==== League table ====
Pos	Team	Pld	W	D	L	GF	GA	GD	Pts	Qualification or relegation
1	Tirana (C)	33	19	11	3	58	27	+31	68	Qualification for the Champions League second qualifying round
2	Vllaznia	33	19	7	7	49	29	+20	64	Qualification for the Europa League first qualifying round
3	Dinamo Tirana	33	14	10	9	48	34	+14	52	Qualification for the Europa League first qualifying round
4	Teuta	33	12	8	13	32	34	−2	44	
5	Shkumbini	33	12	8	13	32	38	−6	44	

Source: Albanian Football Association (in Albanian), Soccerway
Rules for classification: 1) points; 2) points in head-to-head matches; 3) goal difference in head-to-head matches; 4) goals scored in head-to-head matches; 5) total goal difference; 6) total goals scored; 7) draw
(C) Champions

==== Results summary ====
Overall								Home						Away					
Pld	W	D	L	GF	GA	GD	Pts	W	D	L	GF	GA	GD	W	D	L	GF	GA	GD
33	14	10	9	48	34	+14	52	9	5	3	34	19	+15	5	5	6	14	15	−1

Source: Competitive matches

==== Results by round ====
Round	1	2	3	4	5	6	7	8	9	10	11	12	13	14	15	16	17	18	19	20	21	22	23	24	25	26	27	28	29	30	31	32	33
Ground	H	H	A	H	A	H	A	H	A	H	A	A	A	H	A	H	A	H	A	H	A	H	H	A	H	A	H	A	H	H	A	H	A
Result	D	W	D	D	W	D	L	W	W	D	L	D	D	W	D	W	W	L	L	W	W	W	W	L	W	W	L	D	W	D	L	L	L
Position	4	1	5	5	4	3	5	3	2	4	4	4	5	4	4	3	3	3	3	3	3	3	3	3	3	3	3	3	3	3	3	3	3

Source: Competitive matches
A = Away; H = Home; W = Win; D = Draw; L = Loss

==== Matches ====
24 August 2008 1	Dinamo Tirana	0–0	Teuta	Tirana
17:00 CET				Stadium: Selman Stërmasi Stadium

30 August 2008 2	Dinamo Tirana	3–1	Shkumbini	Tirana
15:00 CET	Petričević 7'; Plaku 56', 75'		Gjata 89'	Stadium: Selman Stërmasi Stadium

13 September 2008 3	Besa	0–0	Dinamo Tirana	Kavajë
16:30 CET				Stadium: Besa Stadium

21 September 2008 4	Dinamo Tirana	0–0	Elbasani	Tirana
16:00 CET				Stadium: Selman Stërmasi Stadium

27 September 2008 5	Lushnja	1–2	Dinamo Tirana	Lushnjë
16:00 CET	Bokatola 75'		Jusufi 7'; Plaku 85'	Stadium: Abdurrahman Roza Haxhiu Stadium

5 October 2008 6	Dinamo Tirana	1–1	Vllaznia	Tirana
15:00 CET	Smajli 15' (o.g.)		Dhëmbi 58'	Stadium: Selman Stërmasi Stadium

19 October 2008 7	Tirana	2–1	Dinamo Tirana	Tirana
18:30 CET	Memelli 32'; Muzaka 54'		Allmuça 75'	Stadium: Qemal Stafa Stadium; Referee: Sokol Jareci

25 October 2008 8	Dinamo Tirana	2–0	Partizani Tirana	Tirana
14:30 CET	Poçi 38'; Plaku 73'			Stadium: Selman Stërmasi Stadium; Referee: Albano Janku

=== Albanian Cup ===
==== First round ====
30 October 2008 First leg	Albpetrol	0–1	Dinamo Tirana	Patos
			Jusufi 48'	Stadium: Alush Noga Stadium

=== UEFA Champions League ===
==== First qualifying round ====
15 July 2008 First leg	Dinamo Tirana (Albania)	0–2	(Bosnia and Herzegovina) Modriča	Tirana, Albania
20:00 CET		Report	Miljković 65'; Stokić 79'	Stadium: Qemal Stafa Stadium; Attendance: 2,200; Referee: Saïd Ennjimi (France)

23 July 2008 Second leg	Modriča (Bosnia and Herzegovina)	2–1 (4–1 agg.)	(Albania) Dinamo Tirana	Zenica, Bosnia and Herzegovina
20:00 CET	Zafirović 90'; Bojić 90+2'	Report	Xhafaj 72'	Stadium: Bilino Polje Stadium; Attendance: 957; Referee: Simon Lee Evans (Wales)

== Player seasonal records ==
Competitive matches only. Numbers in brackets indicate appearances made. Updated to games played May 27, 2009.

=== Goalscorers ===
Rank	Name	Kategoria superiore	Kupa e shqiperise	Champions League	Albanian Supercup	Total
1	(Albania) Sebino Plaku	18 (29)	2 (5)	-	0 (1)	20 (35)
2	(Albania) Fatjon Sefa	9 (24)	2 (5)	0 (1)	0 (1)	11 (31)
3	(Albania) Artion Poci	6 (31)	1 (4)	0 (2)	0 (1)	7 (38)
4	(Albania) Elis Bakaj	4 (13)	0 (1)	-	-	4 (14)
5	(Croatia) Pëllumb Jusufi	2 (20)	1 (3)	-	1 (1)	4 (24)
6	(Senegal) Albaye Papa Diop	2 (23)	1 (4)	0 (2)	0 (1)	3 (30)
7	(Croatia) Frane Petričević	1 (17)	0 (1)	-	1 (1)	2 (19)
8	(Albania) Igli Allmuca	2 (28)	0 (1)	0 (4)	0 (1)	2 (35)

=== Goals conceded ===
Rank	Name	Kategoria superiore	Kupa e shqiperise	Champions League	Albanian Supercup	Total
1	(Albania) Elvis Kotorri	5 (8)	-	2 (1)	0 (1)	7 (10)
2	(Argentina) Daniel Bertoya	-	-	2 (1)	-	2 (1)

=== Discipline ===
Name	Kategoria superiore		Kupa e shqiperise		Champions League		Albanian Supercup		Total		
Name	Yellow card	Red card	Yellow card	Red card	Yellow card	Red card	Yellow card	Red card	Yellow card	Red card	Total Cards
(Albania) Sebino Plaku	3	1	-	-	-	-	-	-	3	1	4
(Albania) Artion Poci	-	-	-	-	1	-	1	-	2	-	2
(Albania) Igli Allmuca	1	-	-	-	-	-	1	-	2	-	2
(Albania) Arjan Pisha	1	-	-	-	-	-	-	-	1	-	1
(Albania) Elvis Sina	1	-	-	-	-	-	-	-	1	-	1
(Croatia) Frane Petričević	1	-	-	-	-	-	-	-	1	-	1
(Croatia) Pëllumb Jusufi	-	-	-	-	-	-	1	-	1	-	1
(Senegal) Albaye Papa Diop	-	-	-	-	1	-	-	-	1	-	1
(Croatia) Goran Granić	1	-	-	-	-	-	-	-	1	-	1
(Serbia) Danilo Nikolić	2	-	-	-	-	-	-	-	2	-	2
(Albania) Nertil Ferraj	1	-	-	-	-	-	-	-	1	-	1
(Albania) Hetlem Capja	1	-	-	-	-	-	-	-	1	-	1
