= 2009–10 Kategoria Superiore =

Kategoria Superiore
- Season: 2009–10
- Dates: 23 August 2009 – 19 May 2010
- Champions: Dinamo; 18th Albanian title
- Relegated: Apolonia; Gramozi
- Champions League: Dinamo
- Europa League: Laçi; Tirana; Besa
- Matches: 198
- Goals: 448 (2.26 per match)
- Top goalscorer: Daniel Xhafaj (18 goals)
- Biggest home win: Dinamo 4–0 Gramozi; Shkumbini 4–0 Dinamo
- Biggest away win: Flamurtari 0–3 Dinamo; Flamurtari 0–3 Teuta
- Highest scoring: Besa 6–4 Gramozi

The 2009–10 Kategoria Superiore was the 74th season of top-tier football in Albania and the twelfth season under the name Kategoria superiore. The season began on 23 August 2009 and ended on 19 May 2010. Tirana was the defending champions.

== Team changes from last season ==
Lushnja and Elbasani were directly relegated to the Kategoria e Parë after finishing 11th and 12th in the previous year's standings. They were replaced by Kategoria e Parë champions Laçi and runners-up Skënderbeu.

9th placed Bylis and 10th placed Partizani had to compete in single-match relegation play-offs. Both teams were relegated in the process by losing against the third and fourth-placed teams from Kategoria e Parë, Kastrioti and Gramozi.

== Teams ==
=== Stadia and last season ===
Locations of the 2009–10 Kategoria Superiore teams

Team	Location	Stadium	Capacity	Last season
Apolonia	Fier	Loni Papuçiu Stadium	6,000	8th
Besa	Kavajë	Besa Stadium	6,000	7th
Dinamo	Tirana	Selman Stërmasi Stadium (Note: Dinamo and Tirana all shared the Selman Stërmasi Stadium as well as the Qemal Stafa Stadium.)	10,000	3rd
Flamurtari	Vlorë	Flamurtari Stadium	10,000	6th
Gramozi	Ersekë	Ersekë Stadium	7,000	Kategoria e Parë
Kastrioti	Krujë	Kastrioti Stadium	3,500	Kategoria e Parë
Laçi	Laç	Laçi Stadium	3,000	Kategoria e Parë
Shkumbini	Peqin	Shkumbini Stadium	4,000	5th
Skënderbeu	Korçë	Skënderbeu Stadium	7,000	Kategoria e Parë
Teuta	Durrës	Stadiumi Niko Dovana	10,000	4th
Tirana	Tirana	Selman Stërmasi Stadium	10,000	Champions
Vllaznia	Shkodër	Loro Boriçi Stadium	14,200	2nd

=== Personnel and sponsoring ===
Team	Head coach	Team captain	Kitmaker	Shirt sponsor
Apolonia	(Albania) Hasan Lika	(Serbia) Mladen Brkić	Jako	Abissnet
Besa	(Albania) Shpëtim Duro	(Albania) Orges Shehi	Sportika	Banka Popullore
Dinamo Tirana	(Albania) Shkëlqim Muça	(Albania) Arjan Pisha	Sportika	Alpet
Flamurtari	(Albania) Gugash Magani	(Albania) Artan Sakaj	Sportika	IPBet
Gramozi	(Albania) Agim Canaj	(Albania) Hyserjon Shupe	Legea	Taçi Oil
Tirana	(Albania) Alban Tafaj	(Albania) Devis Mukaj	Lotto	Sigal
Kastrioti	(Albania) Ramazan Ndreu	(Albania) Ylli Shameti	Legea	Ardi-2M
Laçi	(Albania) Stavri Nica	(Albania) Julian Brahja	Sportika	Top Sport
Shkumbini	(Albania) Përparim Daiu	(Albania) Lorenc Pasha	Sportika	ALBA Konstruksion
Skënderbeu	(Albania) Andrea Marko	(Albania) Edi Çajku	Puma	Almeco
Teuta	(Albania) Ylli Shehu	(Albania) Vangjel Mile	Sportika	none
Vllaznia	(Albania) Edi Martini	(Albania) Armir Grima	Jako	Primo

== League table ==
Pos	Team	Pld	W	D	L	GF	GA	GD	Pts	Qualification or relegation
1	Dinamo Tirana (C)	33	19	4	10	56	42	+14	61	Qualification for the Champions League second qualifying round
2	Besa	33	15	8	10	42	33	+9	53	Qualification for the Europa League second qualifying round (Note: Besa qualified for the Europa League second qualifying round by winning the 2009–10 Albanian Cup.)
3	Tirana	33	15	7	11	38	32	+6	52	Qualification for the Europa League first qualifying round
4	Laçi	33	14	9	10	35	28	+7	51	Qualification for the Europa League first qualifying round
5	Flamurtari	33	13	8	12	42	39	+3	47	
6	Vllaznia	33	13	7	13	34	39	−5	46	
7	Shkumbini	33	13	6	14	33	33	0	45 (Note: Shkumbini ahead of Teuta on head-to-head record; Shkumbini–Teuta 4–1, Teuta–Shkumbini 1–0, Shkumbini–Teuta 1–0.)	
8	Teuta	33	13	6	14	33	40	−7	45	
9	Kastrioti (Note: Kastrioti were deducted three points because their players voluntarily left the pitch before the end of the match.) (O)	33	13	6	14	33	35	−2	42 (Note: Kastrioti ahead of Skënderbeu on head-to-head record; Kastrioti–Skënderbeu 2–1, Skënderbeu–Kastrioti 0–1, Kastrioti–Skënderbeu 1–2.)	Qualification for the relegation play-offs
10	Skënderbeu (O)	33	11	9	13	41	41	0	42	Qualification for the relegation play-offs
11	Apolonia (R)	33	10	8	15	36	43	−7	38	Relegation to the 2010–11 Kategoria e Parë
12	Gramozi (R)	33	6	8	19	25	43	−18	26	Relegation to the 2010–11 Kategoria e Parë

Source: Albanian Football Association (in Albanian), Soccerway
Rules for classification: 1) points; 2) points in head-to-head matches; 3) goal difference in head-to-head matches; 4) goals scored in head-to-head matches; 5) total goal difference; 6) total goals scored; 7) draw
(C) Champions; (O) Play-off winners; (R) Relegated

== Results ==
The schedule consists of three rounds. During the first two rounds, each team plays each other once home and away for a total of 22 matches. The pairings of the third round will then be set according to the standings after the first two rounds, giving every team a third game against each opponent for a total of 33 games per team.

=== First and second round ===
Home \ Away	APO	BES	DIN	FLA	GRA	KAS	LAÇ	SKË	SKU	TEU	TIR	VLL
Apolonia		0–2	3–0	1–1	3–0	2–3	2–0	1–1	1–0	2–0	2–0	1–1
Besa	0–0		0–1	1–0	1–0	1–0	1–0	1–0	2–0	1–1	1–1	2–0
Dinamo	3–2	1–0		1–0	4–0	2–0	1–1	3–0	2–1	1–0	2–1	4–2
Flamurtari	2–0	3–0	0–3		2–0	2–0 (Note: The match was awarded to Flamurtari by 2–0 because Kastrioti's players walked off to protest a referee's decision.)	0–0	1–1	1–1	0–3	0–2	2–0
Gramozi	1–0	0–0	0–1	2–0		0–0	1–2	2–0	0–0	2–0	0–1	1–1
Kastrioti	1–1	1–0	1–3	1–1	1–0		0–0	2–1	4–1	1–2	0–1	1–0
Laçi	3–2	0–0	0–1	3–2	1–1	1–0		0–0	1–0	0–0	1–0	3–1
Skënderbeu	2–3	0–2	1–0	4–1	1–1	0–1	4–3		1–0	3–0	1–1	1–1
Shkumbini	3–0	1–2	4–0	2–1	1–1	1–0	1–0	1–0		4–1	1–0	2–1
Teuta	0–2	1–1	1–3	1–0	2–0	2–1	2–1	2–0	1–0		0–1	1–0
Tirana	4–1	0–0	1–2	1–3	1–1	1–1	1–0	1–0	2–0	2–0		0–1
Vllaznia	1–0	2–3	0–0	2–2	1–0	1–0	1–2	3–2	2–0	2–1	0–1	

Source: Albanian Football Association
Legend: Blue = home team win; Yellow = draw; Red = away team win.

=== Third round ===
Home \ Away	APO	BES	DIN	FLA	GRA	KAS	LAÇ	SKË	SKU	TEU	TIR	VLL
Apolonia			2–1			2–1			0–0		1–2	0–1
Besa	2–0			1–2	6–4			1–2	2–0		1–1	
Dinamo		4–3			1–0	1–1	2–4			1–2		1–2
Flamurtari	1–0		2–1			3–0			3–2		3–1	
Gramozi	3–0			1–1		0–2		0–2 (Note: The match was awarded to Skënderbeu by 2–0 after the match was abandoned after 88 minutes at 1–1 due to a pitch invasion by Gramozi fans.)				1–2
Kastrioti		3–2					1–0	1–2		3–0		2–0
Laçi	2–0	0–1		3–1	1–0			1–0	0–0			
Skënderbeu	1–1		4–3	0–1					3–1		2–2	
Shkumbini			1–0		2–1	2–0				1–0	0–1	0–0
Teuta	1–1	3–2		3–1	0–2		0–0	0–0				
Tirana			3–2		1–0	0–1	1–2			2–1		1–2
Vllaznia		2–0		1–1			1–0	0–2 (Note: The match (original result 3–2 for Vllaznia) was awarded to Skënderbeu by 2–0 after Vllaznia fielded an ineligible player.)		0–2		

Source: Albanian Football Association
Legend: Blue = home team win; Yellow = draw; Red = away team win.

== Relegation playoffs ==
Kastrioti and Skënderbeu finished 9th and 10th, respectively, in the league competition and therefore had to participate in a relegation playoff to keep their spots in the league. Skënderbeu Korçë faced Kamza, who finished third in the First Division and Kastrioti Krujë faced Lushnja, who finished fourth in the First Division.

26 May 2010
16:30 CEST

Skënderbeu	1–0	Kamza
Asllani 3'	Report

Ruzhdi Bizhuta Stadium, Elbasan
Referee: Bardhyl Pashaj

27 May 2010
16:30 CEST

Kastrioti	1–0	Lushnja
Abazaj 2'	Report

Qemal Stafa Stadium, Tirana
Referee: Albano Janku

== Top goalscorers ==
Source: Soccerway

Rank	Player	Club	Goals
1	(Albania) Daniel Xhafaj	Besa	18
2	(Albania) Elis Bakaj	Dinamo	16
3	(Serbia) Mladen Brkić	Apolonia	15
4	(Albania) Fatjon Sefa	Dinamo	13
5	(Brazil) Marko dos Santos	Gramozi	11
6	(Croatia) Miliam Guerrib	Skënderbeu	10
6	(Albania) Arlind Nora	Laçi	10
8	(Albania) Oriand Abazaj	Kastrioti	8
8	(Albania) Bekim Balaj	Vllaznia	8
8	(Albania) Ilirjan Çaushaj	Shkumbini	8
8	(Albania) Migen Memelli	Tirana/Flamurtari	8
8	(Albania) Gjergji Muzaka	Tirana	8

== Season statistics ==
=== Scoring ===
- First goal of the season: Robert Alviž for Flamurtari Vlorë against KF Tirana, 11 minutes (23 August 2009).
- Fastest goal in a match: 1 minute – Daniel Xhafaj for Besa Kavajë against Vllaznia Shkodër (29 November 2009).
- Goal scored at the latest point in a match: 90+3 minutes
  - Ilir Nallbani for Vllaznia Shkodër against Apolonia Fier (30 August 2009).
  - Robert Grizhaj for Kastrioti Krujë against Apolonia Fier (7 November 2009).
  - Robert Alviž for Flamurtari Vlorë against Kastrioti Krujë (21 November 2009).
- First own goal of the season: Shpëtim Moçka (Flamurtari Vlorë) for Teuta Durrës, 24 minutes (19 September 2009).
- First penalty kick of the season: 37 minutes – Devis Mema for Flamurtari Vlorë against KF Tirana (23 August 2009).
- Widest winning margin: 4 goals
  - Dinamo Tirana 4-0 Gramozi Ersekë (31 October 2009).
  - Shkumbini Peqin 4-0 Dinamo Tirana (19 December 2009).

== Championship-winning squad ==
Note: Flags indicate national team as defined under FIFA eligibility rules; some limited exceptions apply. Players may hold more than one non-FIFA nationality.

No.	Pos.	Nation	Player
1	GK	ALB	Elvis Kotorri
2	DF	ALB	Elvis Sina
3	DF	SRB	Danilo Nikolic
4	MF	ALB	Asion Daja
5	DF	ALB	Arjan Pisha (captain)
6	DF	ALB	Julian Brahja
7	MF	ALB	Nertil Ferraj
8	FW	BIH	Nedim Halilović
10	MF	CRO	Pëllumb Jusufi
11	FW	ALB	Sebino Plaku
12	GK	ALB	Alban Hoxha
13	MF	ALB	Artion Poci (vice-captain)
14	MF	ALB	Igli Allmuça
15	DF	ALB	Roland Peqini
16	FW	ALB	Fatjon Sefa
17	FW	ALB	Rigels Nezaj
19	MF	ALB	Elis Bakaj
20	DF	ALB	Klevis Bejtja
21	MF	ALB	Hetlem Capja

No.	Pos.	Nation	Player
22	DF	CRO	Goran Granić
23	DF	SEN	Albaye Papa Diop
24	GK	ALB	Sulejman Hoxha
25	FW	CRO	Frane Petricevic
99	FW	ARG	Rubén Cecco
—	GK	ARG	Daniel Alejandro Bertoya
—	DF	ARG	Alejandro Palladino
—	DF	ALB	Eradi Mertiri
—	DF	CRO	Dario Bodrušić
—	MF	ALB	Julian Ahmataj
—	MF	ARG	Agustín González Tapia
—	MF	ALB	Ilirjan Çaushaj
—	MF	ALB	Andi Hasa
—	MF	ALB	Klodian Sulollari
—	FW	ALB	Gers Delia
—	FW	ARG	Mario Antonio Romero
—	FW	ARG	Cristian Andres Campozano
—	FW	ALB	Rigels Nezaj
