= 2008 Albanian Supercup =

- Event: Albanian Supercup
Dinamo Tirana	Vllaznia Shkodër
2	0
- Date: 17 August 2008
- Venue: Qemal Stafa Stadium, Tirana
- Referee: Erjon Dobi

The 2008 Albanian Supercup is the 15th edition of the Albanian Supercup since its establishment in 1989. The match was contested between the 2008 Cup winners Vllaznia Shkodër and the 2007–08 Albanian Superliga champions Dinamo Tirana.

Dinamo Tirana won the final by 2 goals to nil and lifted the cup after years of Tirana dominance of the event.

== Details ==
17 August 2008
20:00 CET

Dinamo Tirana	2–0	Vllaznia Shkodër
Petricevic 17'; Jusufi 78'	Report

Qemal Stafa Stadium, Tirana
Attendance: 500
Referee: Erjon Dobi

Dinamo Tirana	Vllaznia Shkodër

GK	1	(Albania) Elvis Kotorri
RB	2	(Albania) Elvis Sina
CB	5	(Albania) Arjan Pisha
CB	6	(Albania) Julian Brahja
LB	22	(Croatia) Goran Granić
MF	7	(Albania) Nertil Ferraj		(substituted off) 80'
MF	10	(Croatia) Pëllumb Jusufi	Booked
MF	13	(Albania) Artion Poci	Booked	(substituted off) 62'
MF	14	(Albania) Igli Allmuça	Booked
MF	31	(Albania) Hetlem Çapja
ST	25	(Croatia) Frane Petricevic		(substituted off) 74'
Substitutes:
FW	11	(Albania) Sebino Plaku		(substituted on) 62'
FW	16	(Albania) Fatjon Sefa		(substituted on) 80'
DF	23	(Senegal) Albaye Papa Diop		(substituted on) 74'
Manager:
(Bosnia and Herzegovina) Zlatko Dalić

GK	31	(Albania) Oltion Bishani
RB	8	(Albania) Amarildo Belisha		(substituted off) 66'
CB	6	(Croatia) Marko Bašić	Booked
CB	18	(Albania) Elvin Beqiri
LF	2	(Albania) Dritan Smajli		(substituted off) 72'
MF	3	(Albania) Suad Lici	Booked
MF	5	(Albania) Safet Osja		(substituted off) 46'
MF	7	(Nigeria) James Bohadou
MF	20	(Kosovo) Ilir Nallbani
MF	10	(Albania) Albert Kaçi
FW	11	(Albania) Xhevahir Sukaj	(yellow card) 72' (yellow-red card)
Substitutes:
FW	9	(Albania) Vioresin Sinani		(substituted on) 72'
MF	13	(Albania) Erjon Hoti		(substituted on) 66'
MF	21	(Albania) Gilman Lika		(substituted on) 46'
Manager:
(Albania) Agim Canaj

Match officials:

- Assistant referees:
  - Erjon Dobi
  - Fatmir Lama
- Fourth official: Fatmir Elezi (Albania)

Match rules

- 90 minutes
- 30 minutes extra-time if the scores still level
- Penalty shoot-out if scores still level
- Six named substitutes, of which three may be used

== See also ==
- 2007–08 Albanian Superliga
- 2007–08 Albanian Cup
