= Granić =

Granić is a surname. It may refer to:

- Goran Granić (born 1950), Croatian centre-left politician who was the deputy prime minister from 2000 to 2002
- Goran Granić (footballer), Bosnia and Herzegovina football player
- Mate Granić (born 1947), Croatian diplomat and politician

== See also ==
- Keine Grenzen-Żadnych granic, the Polish entry in the Eurovision Song Contest 2003
