= 2008–09 Kategoria e Parë =

Kategoria e Parë
- Season: 2008–09
- Champions: Laçi
- Promoted: Laçi; Skënderbeu; Kastrioti; Gramozi
- Relegated: Tërbuni; Naftëtari

The 2008–09 Kategoria e Parë was the 62nd season of a second-tier association football league in Albania.

== League table ==
| Pos | Team | Pld | W | D | L | GF | GA | GD | Pts | Promotion or relegation |
|---|---|---|---|---|---|---|---|---|---|---|
| 1 | Laçi (C, P) | 30 | 21 | 5 | 4 | 54 | 22 | +32 | 68 | Promotion to 2009–10 Kategoria Superiore |
| 2 | Skënderbeu (P) | 30 | 20 | 5 | 5 | 60 | 32 | +28 | 65 | Promotion to 2009–10 Kategoria Superiore |
| 3 | Kastrioti (P) | 30 | 19 | 6 | 5 | 52 | 24 | +28 | 63 | Play-off promotion to 2009–10 Kategoria Superiore |
| 4 | Gramozi (P) | 30 | 15 | 9 | 6 | 54 | 35 | +19 | 54 | Play-off promotion to 2009–10 Kategoria Superiore |
| 5 | Burreli | 30 | 13 | 8 | 9 | 38 | 27 | +11 | 47 | |
| 6 | Kamza | 30 | 12 | 8 | 10 | 34 | 28 | +6 | 44 | |
| 7 | Turbina | 30 | 12 | 5 | 13 | 45 | 42 | +3 | 41 | |
| 8 | Ada | 30 | 11 | 5 | 14 | 43 | 58 | −15 | 38 | |
| 9 | Luftëtari | 30 | 10 | 7 | 13 | 30 | 37 | −7 | 37 | |
| 10 | Besëlidhja | 30 | 11 | 4 | 15 | 40 | 51 | −11 | 37 | |
| 11 | Sopoti | 30 | 11 | 4 | 15 | 32 | 43 | −11 | 37 | |
| 12 | Skrapari | 30 | 10 | 5 | 15 | 30 | 41 | −11 | 35 | |
| 13 | Pogradeci (O) | 30 | 10 | 4 | 16 | 34 | 44 | −10 | 34 | Play-out relegation to 2009–10 Kategoria e Dytë |
| 14 | Bilisht Sport (O) | 30 | 7 | 7 | 16 | 40 | 47 | −7 | 28 | Play-out relegation to 2009–10 Kategoria e Dytë |
| 15 | Tërbuni (R) | 30 | 7 | 6 | 17 | 23 | 41 | −18 | 27 | Relegation to 2009–10 Kategoria e Dytë |
| 16 | Naftëtari (R) | 30 | 6 | 2 | 22 | 28 | 65 | −37 | 20 | Relegation to 2009–10 Kategoria e Dytë |

Source: Soccerway
Rules for classification: 1) points; 2) goal difference; 3) number of goals scored; 4) head-to-head points; 5) head-to-head goal difference; 6) draw. (Head-to-head record is applied for clubs with the same number of points only once all matches between said clubs have been played.)
(C) Champions; (O) Play-off winners; (P) Promoted; (R) Relegated

== Promotion playoffs ==
29 May 2009
17:00

| Partizani | 0–1 | Kastrioti |
|---|---|---|
| | Report | Prela 44' |

Niko Dovana Stadium, Durrës
30 May 2009
17:00

| Bylis | 2–5 (a.e.t.) | Gramozi |
|---|---|---|
| Bakiu 19'; Muça 27' | Report | Bejollari 4'; Peçi 74'; Juriander 92'; Lena 102'; dos Santos 110' |

Qemal Stafa Stadium, Tirana

== Relegation playoffs ==
20 May 2009

| Pogradeci | 1–1 (a.e.t.) | Adriatiku |
|---|---|---|
| Jahaj 13' (pen.) | Report | Uka 55' |
Penalties
| | 10–9 |

Qemal Stafa Stadium, Tirana
21 May 2009

| Bilisht Sport | 2–2 (a.e.t.) | Vlora |
|---|---|---|
| Ezerioha 68'; Xhufi 120' | Report | Moqi 28'; Miho 92' |
Penalties
| | 5–3 |

Selman Stërmasi Stadium, Tirana
