= Fatjon Sefa =

Albanian footballer

Personal information
- Full name: Fatjon Fatmir Sefa
- Date of birth: 23 July 1984 (age 42)
- Place of birth: Lushnjë, Albania
- Height: 1.84 m (6 ft 0 in)
- Position: Forward

Team information
- Current team: Lushnja
- Number: 29

Youth career
- 2000–2004: Lushnja

Senior career*
Years	Team	Apps	(Gls)
2002–2006	Lushnja	17	(4)
2006–2007	Shkumbini	12	(1)
2007–2008	Lushnja		(17)
2008–2011	Dinamo Tirana	68	(23)
2011	→ Besa Kavajë (loan)	14	(4)
2011–2012	Lushnja	27	(6)
2012–2014	Besa Kavajë	50	(19)
2014–2015	Skënderbeu	28	(6)
2015–2018	Lushnja	104	(41)
- * Club domestic league appearances and goals as of 18 October 2019

Fatjon Fatmir Sefa (born 23 July 1984) is an Albanian former professional footballer who played as a forward. He is nicknamed Ujku (Albanian for wolf) due to his scoring abilities inside of the zone.

== Club career ==
=== Dinamo Tirana ===
Sefa moved to Dinamo Tirana in the summer of 2008 ahead of the club's Champions League campaign of 2008–09. He moved from his hometown club, Lushnja and was given the number 16 shirt for his first season. He played the first leg of Dinamo Tirana's Champions League encounter against FK Modrica. He came on in the 53rd minute for Argentine, Cristian Andres Campozano.

Sefa made his league debut in a Dinamo Tirana jersey on the opening day of the season against Teuta Durrës. He came on in the 76th minute for fellow new signing, Frane Petricevic. He scored his first goal for the club on 1 November 2008 against Apolonia Fier. Sefa opened the score in the 14th minute and also played the full game.

He also managed to score a hat-trick against Apolonia Fier on 15 February 2009, his goals came in the 45th, 62nd and 74th minute of the game, after completing his hat-trick he substituted for Rubén Cecco in the 85th minute. During the 2008–09 season he played 24 games and scored 9 goals, making him the club's second highest goalscorer for the season. During his time at the capital club, he created a fierce partnership with Elis Bakaj.

=== Besa Kavajë ===
In July 2012, Sefa joined top flight side Besa Kavajë by signing a contract for the upcoming season.

=== Skënderbeu Korçë ===
In May 2014, following the relegation of Besa Kavajë in Albanian First Division, Sefa joined Albanian champions Skënderbeu Korçë by signing a one-year contract.

He made his competitive debut with the team in the opening Albanian Superliga week against the newly promoted side Elbasani at Qemal Stafa Stadium, scoring the only goal of the match in the first half. After winning the Albanian Supercup and the Albanian Superliga title with the club, Sefa left Skënderbeu Korçë at the end of the 2014–15 season through a mutual agreement to terminate his contract, which was due to expire the following year in 2016.

=== Third return to Lushnja ===
In August 2015, Sefa returned to his hometown club Lushnja for the third time in his career, taking the vacant number 29 and was given the Captaincy. On 14 May 2017, Sefa scored the only goal in the final match against Bylis Ballsh to help Lushnja finish top of Group B, helping the club to return to Albanian Superliga for the first time in three years.

Sefa made his first top flight appearance in two years on 10 September in Lushnja's first match of the season against Vllaznia Shkodër. He opened his scoring account on matchday 6 against his ex side Skënderbeu Korçë, scoring the temporary equalizer with a header in an eventual 4–1 away defeat. Sefa was on the scoresheet two weeks later where he scored a last-minute goal to help Lushnja clinch their first league victory.

Later on 9 December, Sefa scored a brace against reigning champions Kukësi, including a shot outside the zone, to give his team a 3–1 win at Zeqir Ymeri Stadium; the first away win of the season and the first in six matches.

== Career statistics ==
As of 9 December 2017

Club statistics
Club	Season	League			Cup		Europe		Other		Total	
Club	Season	Division	Apps	Goals	Apps	Goals	Apps	Goals	Apps	Goals	Apps	Goals
Dinamo Tirana	2008–09	Albanian Superliga	24	9	5	2	1 (Note: All appearance(s) in UEFA Champions League)	0	1 (Note: Appearance in Albanian Supercup)	0	31	11
Dinamo Tirana	2009–10	Albanian Superliga	30	13	4	0	—		—		34	13
Dinamo Tirana	2010–11	Albanian Superliga	14	1	3	2	1	0	1	0	26	10
Dinamo Tirana	Total		68	23	12	4	2	0	2	0	84	27
Besa Kavajë	2014–15	Albanian Superliga	14	4	4	0	—		—		18	4
Lushnja	2011–12	Albanian First Division	27	6	1	0	—		1 (Note: Appearance in Albanian First Division Promotion play-off)	0	29	6
Besa Kavajë	2012–13	Albanian Superliga	24	6	2	0	—		—		26	6
Besa Kavajë	2013–14	Albanian Superliga	26	13	0	0	—		—		26	13
Besa Kavajë	Total		50	19	2	0	—		—		52	19
Skënderbeu Korçë	2014–15	Albanian Superliga	28	6	7	2	2	0	1	0	38	8
Lushnja	2015–16	Albanian First Division	19	7	2	0	—		—		21	7
Lushnja	2016–17	Albanian First Division	26	10	0	0	—		—		26	10
Lushnja	2017–18	Albanian Superliga	13	4	0	0	—		—		13	4
Lushnja	Total		58	21	2	0	—		—		60	21
Career total			245	79	28	6	4	0	4	0	281	85

== Honours ==
=== Club ===
Dinamo Tirana

- Albanian Superliga: 2009–10
- Albanian Cup: Runner-up 2009–10

Skënderbeu Korçë

- Albanian Supercup: 2014
- Albanian Superliga: 2014–15

Sporting positions
Preceded by Gentian Çela	Lushnja captain 2015–	Succeeded by Incumbent
