= Alban Hoxha =

Albanian footballer (born 1987)

Personal information
- Date of birth: 23 November 1987 (age 38)
- Place of birth: Cërrik, PSR Albania
- Height: 1.88 m (6 ft 2 in)
- Position: Goalkeeper

Youth career
- 2000–2004: Turbina
- 2004–2005: Dinamo Tirana

Senior career*
Years	Team	Apps	(Gls)
2004–2011	Dinamo Tirana	45	(0)
2005–2006	→ Turbina (loan)		
2009	→ Apolonia (loan)	8	(0)
2010	→ Kosova Vushtrri (loan)		
2011–2012	Kastrioti	6	(0)
2012–2013	Besa	23	(0)
2013–2026	Partizani	310	(0)

International career^{‡}
2005	Albania U19	3	(0)
2014–2020	Albania	4	(0)
- * Club domestic league appearances and goals as of 1 November 2024 ‡ National team caps and goals as of 28 March 2017

Alban Hoxha (Albanian pronunciation: [alˈban ˈhɔdʒa]; born 23 November 1987) is an Albanian former professional footballer who played as a goalkeeper.

== Club career ==
=== Dinamo Tirana ===
Hoxha started youth football aged six and was raised through the ranks at his hometown team Turbina before joining the youth team of Dinamo Tirana in 2004. He was loaned back out to Turbina for the 2005–06 campaign, where he played in the Kategoria e Parë. He returned the following season and joined the first team at Dinamo as Ilion Lika understudy. He made his top flight debut with Dinamo on 10 March 2007 in a home game against Elbasani. He featured in 11 league games between March and the end of the season due to first choice keeper Lika being sidelined with injury.

The following season, he became second choice to Elvis Kotorri following the departure of Ilion Lika, and he made 2 league appearances as Dinamo were crowned Kategoria Superiore champions for the first time since 2002. During the first half of the 2008–09 season he only made one league and one cup appearance before being loaned out to fellow Superiore side Apolonia in January for the remainder of the season. He made 8 appearances while on loan at Apolonia and kept 3 clean sheets, helping the team avoid the relegation play-off places by a single point.

He returned to his parent club Dinamo ahead of the 2009–10 season and made 6 league appearances as he won his second Superiore title with Dinamo. The following season, he competed with Albanian international Isli Hidi for the first choice spot in the team, and following Hidi's departure to Olympiakos Nicosia in January 2011 he became Dinamo's first choice keeper for the first time and eventually featured in 24 league games as Dinamo narrowly avoided relegation after beating Besëlidhja in the relegation play-off.

At the time with Dinamo, he had a short spell with Kosova Vushtrri in the Kosovo Superleague.

=== Kastrioti ===
On 22 August 2011, Hoxha completed a transfer to Kastrioti by penning a one-year contract as a free agent. There he competed with Argjent Halili for the starting lineup, ultimately losing out as he only made 6 league appearances, and was used mainly in the Albanian Cup, where he featured 10 times. He left the club at the end of the season along with Halili, and was in talks with Kukësi regarding a possible transfer, but a move never materialised as an agreement could not be reached.

=== Besa ===
He joined Besa ahead of the 2012–13 campaign and was immediately made the first choice goalkeeper ahead of Ibrahim Bejte. Throughout the season Hoxha made 23 league and 2 cup appearances, helping Besa to a 9th-place finish, avoiding the relegation play-off places.

=== Partizani ===
He joined newly promoted Partizani in the summer of 2013 and was given the number 1 shirt as well being named captain for the 2013–14 season.

Hoxha went 1,084 minutes without conceding a goal during 2014–15 Kategoria Superiore season and got the all-time Kategoria Superiore record as he broke the 30-year-old record set by the goalkeeper of KS Labinoti (modern day called KF Elbasani), Bujar Gogunja, who kept intact net goal for 1037 minutes. At the end of 2014, Hoxha was named Albanian Footballer of the Year for his performances throughout the season.

In March 2015, Hoxha was named Albanian Superliga Player of the Month after playing 5 matches, keeping a clean sheet.

On 1 November 2015, during the league match against Teuta, Hoxha suffered a jaw-injury after a clash with his team-mate Gëzim Krasniqi in the 76th minute of the match, being taken off the field by an ambulance.

On 20 July 2016, in the returning leg of Champions League second qualifying round at Groupama Arena, Hoxha was the main protagonist of the game. After the regular and extra time had finished in a 1–1 draw, the game was decided in a penalty shootout where Hoxha saved three penalties after himself having scored a 'Panenka'. It was the first time that Partizani successfully progressed to the Champions League third qualifying round.

Hoxha made his 100th Kategoria Superiore appearance for Partizani on 17 October 2016 in the 4–0 win over Flamurtari at Elbasan Arena.

On 9 August 2017, Hoxha agreed a new contract extension with the club, signing until 2020. Hoxha was excluded from the lineup in the opening matchday of championship against Laçi, lost 0–2. Following the match, manager Mark Iuliano said that Hoxha has violated the club's rules. It was reported that Hoxha left the team's gather without permission. Club director Luciano Moggi said that Hoxha would not play unless he apologises to the team, but Hoxha refused and instead handed in his captaincy.

In July 2018, Hoxha was renamed captain following the departure of Idriz Batha. Despite the club finishing 5th in the previous season, Skënderbeu Korçë's exclusion from the UEFA competitions meant that Partizani had qualified for the 2018–19 UEFA Europa League first qualifying round. The team faced Slovenia's NK Maribor, and lost both matches 3–0 on aggregate which brought the early elimination from the competition. Hoxha commenced his domestic season by playing in the opening match of 2018–19 Kategoria Superiore, conceding an injury time penalty for a foul on Dejvi Bregu which caused the loss. Hoxha faced another penalty in the second matchday against Kamza; the penalty was conceded in the 45th minute with the score still 0–0, but Hoxha managed to save Sebino Plaku's attempt as Partizani would later score and win the match 1–0 for the first three points of the season.

In June 2020, Hoxha signed a new one-year contract with the club. Later on 8 November, he kept a clean sheet in a 2–0 win over Kukësi in what turned out to be his 300th appearance for the club in all competitions.

Hoxha was relegated to bench ahead of 2022–23 season in favor of newly signed goalkeeper Bekim Rexhepi.

== International career ==
=== Youth ===
Hoxha was called up for the first time at Albania under-19 team for the 2006 UEFA European Under-19 Championship qualifying campaign where he played in all three Group 9 matches.

=== Senior ===
==== Beginnings ====
After the end of the 2014 FIFA World Cup qualification, the second choice goalkeeper Samir Ujkani left the team to play for the Kosovo. Albania were looking forward for a third choice behind Etrit Berisha, which was a starter choice and Orges Shehi, which became second choice after leaving of Ujkani.

==== UEFA Euro 2016 campaign ====
For the UEFA Euro 2016 qualifying second round matches against Denmark and Serbia in October 2014, Hoxha received his first senior team call-up by the Albania coach Gianni De Biasi as a third choice goalkeeper. He remained as an unused substitute for both matches. For the friendlies against France and Italy in November 2014, Hoxha had some issue family problems and he was replaced with the fellow Kategoria Superiore goalkeeper Stivi Frashëri of Tirana.

On 16 November 2015, Hoxha made his official debut with Albania by replacing Berisha during the friendly match against Georgia which ended in a 2–2 draw at Qemal Stafa Stadium.

On 21 May 2016, Hoxha was named in Albania's preliminary 27-man squad for UEFA Euro 2016, and in Albania's final 23-man UEFA Euro squad on 31 May.

Hoxha didn't manage to play any minute of all Group A matches as Albania were eliminated by ranking in the 3rd place behind hosts France against which they lost 2–0 and Switzerland against which they also lost 1–0 in the opening match and ahead of Romania by beating them 1–0 in the closing match with a goal by Armando Sadiku. Albania finished the group in the third position with three points and with a goal difference –2, and was ranked last in the third-placed teams, which eventually eliminated them.

==== 2018 FIFA World Cup campaign ====
On 12 November 2016, in the matchday 4 of 2018 FIFA World Cup qualification against Israel, Hoxha made his competitive debut by coming on as a 57th-minute substitute to save a penalty kick from Eran Zahavi with Albania already 0–1 down, however, he conceded two more goals as "Red and Blacks" were defeated 0–3 at Elbasan Arena.

== Personal life ==
Hoxha was married to his longtime girlfriend Dorjana Haka. They became parents in November 2014 where Dorjana Haka gave birth to a boy but she died at the time of the birth in a hospital in Tirana. However the baby survived. He is currently engaged to the Albanian singer Ciljeta.

Following Albania's historic participation at UEFA Euro 2016, Hoxha was among the members of the national team who were issued diplomatic passports by the Albanian government in recognition of their achievement.

== Career statistics ==
=== Club ===
As of 25 August 2018

Appearances and goals by club, season and competition
Club	Season	League			Cup		Europe		Other		Total	
Club	Season	Division	Apps	Goals	Apps	Goals	Apps	Goals	Apps	Goals	Apps	Goals
Dinamo Tirana	2004–05	Kategoria Superiore	0	0	0	0	—		—		0	0
Dinamo Tirana	2006–07	Kategoria Superiore	11	0	0	0	—		—		11	0
Dinamo Tirana	2007–08	Kategoria Superiore	2	0	0	0	—		—		2	0
Dinamo Tirana	2008–09	Kategoria Superiore	1	0	1	0	0	0	0	0	2	0
Dinamo Tirana	2009–10	Kategoria Superiore	6	0	3	0	0	0	—		9	0
Dinamo Tirana	2010–11	Kategoria Superiore	26	0	7	0	0	0	0	0	33	0
Dinamo Tirana	Total		46	0	11	0	0	0	0	0	57	0
Turbina (loan)	2005–06	Kategoria e Parë	0	0	0	0	—		—		0	0
Apolonia (loan)	2008–09	Kategoria Superiore	8	0	0	0	—		—		8	0
Kosova Vushtrri (loan)	2009–10	Superleague of Kosovo	?	?	?	?	—		—		0	0
Kastrioti	2011–12	Kategoria Superiore	6	0	11	0	—		—		17	0
Besa	2012–13	Kategoria Superiore	23	0	2	0	—		—		25	0
Partizani	2013–14	Kategoria Superiore	31	0	3	0	—		—		34	0
Partizani	2014–15	Kategoria Superiore	30	0	1	0	—		—		31	0
Partizani	2015–16	Kategoria Superiore	32	0	2	0	2 (Note: Appearance(s) in UEFA Europa League)	0	—		36	0
Partizani	2016–17	Kategoria Superiore	34	0	1	0	7 (Note: One appearance in UEFA Europa League, one appearance in UEFA Champions League)	0	—		42	0
Partizani	2017–18	Kategoria Superiore	33	0	3	0	2	0	—		38	0
Partizani	2018–19	Kategoria Superiore	22	0	0	0	2	0	—		4	0
Partizani	Total		189	0	10	0	13	0	—		185	0
Career total			245	0	34	0	13	0	0	0	286	0

=== International ===
As of 29 December 2020

Appearances and goals by national team and year
National team	Year	Apps	Goals
Albania	2014	0	0
Albania	2015	1	0
Albania	2016	1	0
Albania	2017	1	0
Albania	2018	0	0
Albania	2019	0	0
Albania	2020	1	0
Total		4	0

== Honours ==
=== Club ===
Dinamo Tirana

- Kategoria Superiore: 2007–08, 2009–10
- Partizani
- Kategoria Superiore: 2018–2019

=== Individual ===
- Albanian Footballer of the Year: 2014
- Albanian Superliga Player of the Month: March 2015
