= Julian Brahja =

Albanian footballer & coach (born 1980)

Personal information
- Full name: Julian Brahja
- Date of birth: 6 December 1980 (age 45)
- Place of birth: Laç, Albania
- Height: 1.80 m (5 ft 11 in)
- Position: Centre-back

Team information
- Current team: Dinamo Tirana (manager)

Youth career
- 1995–1998: Laçi

Senior career*
Years	Team	Apps	(Gls)
1998–2000	Laçi	10	(0)
2000–2002	Besëlidhja Lezhë	44	(0)
2002–2003	Elbasani	26	(2)
2003–2004	Teuta Durrës	22	(1)
2004–2005	Laçi	44	(0)
2005–2006	Elbasani	35	(3)
2006–2007	Teuta Durrës	2	(0)
2007–2008	Kastrioti Krujë	27	(0)
2008–2009	Dinamo Tirana	21	(0)
2009–2010	Laçi	30	(5)
2010–2012	Flamurtari Vlorë	42	(1)
2012–2015	Kukësi	54	(2)
2015	Teuta Durrës	15	(0)
2015–2016	Tërbuni Pukë	8	(0)
2016	Bylis Ballsh	15	(1)
2016–2017	Dinamo Tirana	18	(0)
Total		393	(15)

Managerial career
- 2017–: Dinamo Tirana (assistant)
- * Club domestic league appearances and goals as of 31 May 2017

Julian Brahja (born 6 December 1980) is an Albanian professional football coach and former player who is the current assistant manager of Albanian First Division club Dinamo Tirana. A former defender, he started his career with his hometown club Laçi as a teenager at the age of 14, where he would turn professional in 1998. He has played for 10 clubs in Albania during his professional career since 1998.

== Club career ==
=== Dinamo Tirana ===
On 18 June 2008, Brahja signed a one-year deal with the second-most successful team in Albania, Dinamo Tirana, for an undisclosed fee, becoming the club's third summer signing. He was called up for the team's European campaign in the 2008–09 UEFA Champions League. On 15 July, in the first leg of the first qualifying round against Bosnian side Modriča, Brahja was an unused substitute in an eventual 0–2 home defeat. Eight days later, in the returning leg at Bilino Polje Stadium, Brahja was again on the bench for the entire match with Dinamo who were defeated 2–1 in the last minutes.

On 24 August 2008, Brahja made his league debut in the team's opening match of the 2008–09 Albanian Superliga season against Teuta Durrës, playing 90 minutes in a goalless draw at Selman Stërmasi Stadium. Throughout the 2008–09 season, Brahja was an important instrument for Zlatko Dalić and then Shkëlqim Muça, playing 21 out of 33 matches in an eventual third-place finish. Following the end of the 2008–09 season, Brahja terminated his contract with the club.

=== Return to Laçi ===
Following his departure from Dinamo Tirana, Brahja returned to his boyhood club Laçi for the 2009–10 season. He made his first appearance of the season on 23 August 2009 in the team's opening league match of season away against Skënderbeu Korçë, playing full-90 minutes in a 4–3 dramatic defeat. Later, on 19 September, Brahja scored his first career brace and also the first goals of the season during the 3–2 home win against Apolonia Fier, helping Laçi to get its first win of the season. Brahja was again in the scoresheet on 19 December when he netted the winner of the match against Kastrioti Krujë, giving Laçi three important points.

Brahja established in the starting lineup, playing 30 league match throughout the season, all of them as a starter, and scored a high-career 5 goals. Laçi concluded the season in the 4th position, qualifying thus in the 2010–11 UEFA Europa League first qualifying round for the first time in its history. Brahja remained at the club for their European campaign where Laçi was seeded to play with Belarusian side Dnepr Mogilev. In the first leg at Niko Dovana Stadium on 1 July 2010, Brahja was the captain of the team and played full-90 minutes in an eventual 1–1 draw. In the returning leg one week later at Spartak Stadion, Brahja captained again but was sent off after two yellow cards in the 72nd minute as Laçi were thrashed 7–1 by Dneper, who progressed to the next round with the aggregate 8–2. Following the end of European campaign, Brahja announced his departure from the club.

=== Flamurtari Vlorë ===
On 14 July 2010, Brahja joined Flamurtari Vlorë on a free transfer, signing a one-year deal. He made his league debut on 25 September 2010 against Teuta Durrës in the match valid for the 5th week of 2010–11 Albanian Superliga, where he played full-90 minutes in an eventual 2–1 away lose. He went on to play further 26 league matches until the end of the season in an eventual second-place finish.

In his second season, Brahja was not used regularly by then coach Shkëlqim Muça, playing 15 out of 26. He scored his first goal with the club on 8 April 2012 during the 2–0 defeat of Bylis Ballsh at Flamurtari Stadium. Brahja was also important in the team's run in Albanian Cup, playing 11 matches in an eventual semi-final exit.

=== Kukësi ===
On 20 July 2012, Brahja completed a transfer to newly promoted Kukësi by penning a contract until June 2014.

=== Teuta Durrës ===
On 5 January 2015, Teuta Durrës president Edmond Hasanbelliu confirmed that Brahja had signed with the club until the end of 2014–15 season. He made his competitive debut with the club on 24 January in a 2–1 away defeat to Flamurtari Vlorë, a match that was dubbed as manipulating from AFA. Two days later, the Prosecution of Vlora began investigations for this match. He was ever-presented during the second part of the season, playing every single minute in their bid to escape relegation. On 17 May, in the penultimate league match against Apolonia Fier, their closest survival rivals, Brahja played a vital role in the team's 1–0 home win, securing thus mathematically staying for the next season. Following the end of the season, Brahja left the team.

=== Tërbuni Pukë ===
In July 2015, Brahja joined newly promoted side Tërbuni Pukë in their first ever Albanian Superliga season, signing a contract until the end of the season. During his presentation, he was given the vacant number 5. On 23 August, Brahja was a starter in club's first ever Albanian Superliga match against Tirana, where he played full-90 minutes in an eventual 1–2 home loss. On 4 October, during the embarrassing 7–0 loss to Flamurtari Vlorë, Brahja suffered an injury that kept him off the pitch for more than a month. On 6 December, Brahja returned to play in first match after more than two months exactly against Flamurtari Vlorë, playing full-90 minutes in a 1–0 home triumph, returning the club to the winning ways after three consecutive defeats. During the first part of the season, Brahja appeared in only nine matches, including eight in league, failing to make an impact and cement his place at the starting line up, and eventually left the team in January 2016.

=== Bylis Ballsh ===
On 7 January 2016, Brahja signed a contract until the end of the season with Albanian Superliga strugglers Bylis Ballsh in their bid to escape relegation. He was assigned number 4, and made his debut on 31 January in a 3–0 away loss to Kukësi. A week later, Brahja scored his first Bylis Ballsh goal, netting the third goal during the 4–0 home win versus the survival rivals of Tërbuni Pukë.

== Managerial career ==
After retiring from football following the end of 2016–17 season, on 22 July, Brahja was appointed assistant coach of Dinamo Tirana.

== Honours ==
=== Club ===
Laçi

- Albanian Cup: 2004–05

Elbasani

- Albanian Superliga: 2005–06
