= 2008–09 Kategoria Superiore =

Kategoria Superiore
- Season: 2008–09
- Dates: 24 August 2008 – 23 May 2009
- Champions: Tirana; 24th Albanian title
- Relegated: Bylis (via play-off); Partizani (via play-off); Lushnja; Elbasani
- Champions League: Tirana
- Europa League: Vllaznia; Dinamo; Flamurtari
- Matches: 198
- Goals: 427 (2.16 per match)
- Top goalscorer: Migen Memelli (23 goals)
- Biggest home win: Tirana 6–2 Bylis; Dinamo 5–1 Bylis; Teuta 4–0 Vllaznia; Flamurtari 4–0 Besa
- Biggest away win: Lushnja 1–4 Vllaznia; Elbasani 1–4 Vllaznia
- Highest scoring: Tirana 6–2 Bylis

The 2008–09 Kategoria Superiore was the 73rd season of top-tier football in Albania and the eleventh season under the name Kategoria Superiore. The season began on 24 August 2008 and ended on 23 May 2009. The defending champions were Dinamo Tirana.

KF Tirana won their 24th national league title and qualified for the UEFA Champions League; Vllaznia, Dinamo Tirana and 2008–09 Albanian Cup winners Flamurtari gained access to the UEFA Europa League. On the bottom end of the table, Lushnja and Elbasani were directly relegated. Bylis and Partizani had to face teams from the Kategoria e Parë in relegation matches. Both teams lost and thus were demoted as well.

== Promotion and relegation ==
Besëlidhja and Skënderbeu were directly relegated to the Kategoria e Parë after finishing 11th and 12th in the previous year's standings. They were replaced by Kategoria e Parë champions Bylis and runners-up Apolonia.

9th placed Teuta and 10th placed Kastrioti had to compete in single-match relegation play-offs. Kastrioti were relegated in the process by losing on penalties against the 3rd placed team from Kategoria e Parë, Lushnja. On the other hand, Teuta saved their place in Albania's top league by beating Burreli, who had finished in 4th place in the Kategoria e Parë, with 2–1 after extra time.

== Teams ==
=== Stadia and last season ===
Locations of the 2008–09 Kategoria Superiore teams

Team	Location	Stadium	Capacity	Last season
Apolonia	Fier	Loni Papuçiu Stadium	6,000	Kategoria e Parë
Besa	Kavajë	Besa Stadium	12,000	3rd
Bylis	Ballsh	Adush Muça Stadium	6,000	Kategoria e Parë
Dinamo	Tirana	Selman Stërmasi Stadium (Note: Dinamo, Partizani and Tirana all shared the Selman Stërmasi Stadium as well as the Qemal Stafa Stadium.)	12,000	Champions
Elbasani	Elbasan	Ruzhdi Bizhuta Stadium	13,000	4th
Flamurtari	Vlorë	Flamurtari Stadium	8,500	8th
Lushnja	Lushnjë	Abdurrahman Roza Haxhiu Stadium	6,000	Kategoria e Parë
Partizani	Tirana	Selman Stërmasi Stadium	12,000	2nd
Shkumbini	Peqin	Shkumbini Stadium	6,000	5th
Teuta	Durrës	Niko Dovana Stadium	12,000	4th
Tirana	Tirana	Selman Stërmasi Stadium	12,000	6th
Vllaznia	Shkodër	Loro Boriçi Stadium	15,000	7th

== League table ==
Pos	Team	Pld	W	D	L	GF	GA	GD	Pts	Qualification or relegation
1	Tirana (C)	33	19	11	3	58	27	+31	68	Qualification for the Champions League second qualifying round
2	Vllaznia	33	19	7	7	49	29	+20	64	Qualification for the Europa League first qualifying round
3	Dinamo Tirana	33	14	10	9	48	34	+14	52	Qualification for the Europa League first qualifying round
4	Teuta	33	12	8	13	32	34	−2	44	
5	Shkumbini	33	12	8	13	32	38	−6	44	
6	Flamurtari	33	10	12	11	33	33	0	42	Qualification for the Europa League second qualifying round (Note: Flamurtari qualified for the Europa League second qualifying round by winning the 2008–09 Albanian Cup.)
7	Besa	33	10	10	13	31	41	−10	40	
8	Apolonia	33	11	5	17	36	43	−7	38	
9	Bylis (R)	33	9	10	14	28	38	−10	37	Qualification for the relegation play-offs
10	Partizani (R)	33	9	9	15	27	36	−9	36	Qualification for the relegation play-offs
11	Lushnja (R)	33	8	12	13	25	35	−10	36	Relegation to the 2009–10 Kategoria e Parë
12	Elbasani (R)	33	7	14	12	28	39	−11	35	Relegation to the 2009–10 Kategoria e Parë

Source: Albanian Football Association (in Albanian), Soccerway
Rules for classification: 1) points; 2) points in head-to-head matches; 3) goal difference in head-to-head matches; 4) goals scored in head-to-head matches; 5) total goal difference; 6) total goals scored; 7) draw
(C) Champions; (R) Relegated

== Results ==
The schedule consisted of three rounds. During the first two rounds, each team played each other once home and away for a total of 22 matches. The pairings of the third round were then set according to the standings after the first two rounds, giving every team a third game against each opponent for a total of 33 games per team.

=== First and second round ===
Home \ Away	APO	BES	BYL	DIN	ELB	FLA	LUS	PAR	SKU	TEU	TIR	VLL
Apolonia		3–1	1–0	0–2	2–2	1–1	2–0	3–1	0–1	1–0	0–2	1–2
Besa	2–1		3–0	0–0	1–0	0–1	0–0	0–0	2–0	1–1	1–3	1–0
Bylis	1–0	2–3		1–0	1–1	1–1	1–0	0–1	2–1	2–0	0–0	1–2
Dinamo	3–2	4–2	5–1		0–0	1–1	1–0	2–0	3–1	0–0	2–4	1–1
Elbasani	0–0	0–1	1–0	2–2		0–0	2–0	0–1	1–1	0–1	1–0	0–0
Flamurtari	0–2	2–0	0–0	0–2	0–1		2–0	1–0	0–0	1–1	2–0	1–0
Lushnja	3–1	0–1	1–1	1–2	1–0	2–1		0–1	1–1	1–1	0–0	1–4
Partizani	0–1	1–0	1–1	1–0	2–2	2–0	0–0		0–2	0–0	2–2	1–2
Shkumbini	2–0	1–0	4–1	0–0	2–1	2–1	1–2	1–0		1–0	0–0	1–0
Teuta	2–1	0–1	1–0	0–0	1–2	1–0	1–1	0–0	2–0		0–1	4–0
Tirana	3–0	1–1	6–2	2–1	0–0	3–1	1–0	2–1	2–0	1–2		1–1
Vllaznia	3–1	4–1	1–0	0–1	2–0	1–0	2–0	2–1	2–2	2–1	0–0	

Source: Albanian Football Association
Legend: Blue = home team win; Yellow = draw; Red = away team win.

=== Third round ===
Home \ Away	APO	BES	BYL	DIN	ELB	FLA	LUS	PAR	SKU	TEU	TIR	VLL
Apolonia			0–0		3–1				3–1	2–0		0–1
Besa	0–2			1–1	1–1		2–2			2–0	1–1	
Bylis		2–0		3–0		1–1		1–0			0–0	
Dinamo	3–1				2–0		1–1		3–0	1–2	2–3	
Elbasani			2–1			1–1			2–2	3–2		1–4
Flamurtari	0–0	4–0		2–1				2–1			1–2	
Lushnja	2–1		1–0		0–0	1–1		1–0				
Partizani	2–1	0–0		1–2	2–1						2–2	
Shkumbini		1–0	0–2			1–1	1–0	0–1				1–2
Teuta			1–0			2–3	0–1	3–2	1–0			1–0
Tirana	2–0				3–0		2–1		3–1	4–1		2–1
Vllaznia		3–2	0–0	1–0		3–1	1–1	2–0				

Source: Albanian Football Association
Legend: Blue = home team win; Yellow = draw; Red = away team win.

== Relegation playoffs ==
Bylis as 9th-placed team (against the 4th-placed team of the Kategoria e Parë, Gramozi) and 10th-placed Partizani (against 3rd-placed Kategoria e Parë team Kastrioti) both competed in relegation play-off games after the end of the season. Superiore sides Partizani and Bylis lost their matches and were thus relegated to the Kategoria e Parë.

29 May 2009
17:00 CEST

Partizani	0–1	Kastrioti
	Report	Prela 42'

Niko Dovana Stadium, Durrës

30 May 2009
17:00 CEST

Bylis	2–5 (a.e.t.)	Gramozi
Bakiu 18'; Muça 28'	Report	Bejollari 4'; Peçi 73'; Juriander 91'; Lena 101' dos Santos 111'

Qemal Stafa Stadium, Tirana

== Top scorers ==
Source: soccerway.com

Rank	Player	Club	Goals
1	(Albania) Migen Memelli	Tirana	23
2	(Albania) Sebino Plaku	Dinamo	17
3	(Albania) Vioresin Sinani	Vllaznia	14
4	(Albania) Emiljano Vila	Teuta	12
5	(Albania) Xhevahir Sukaj	Vllaznia	10
6	(Serbia) Mladen Brkić	Apolonia	9
6	(Albania) Marius Ngjela	Partizani	9
6	(Albania) Fatjon Sefa	Dinamo	9
9	(Albania) Endri Bakiu	Bylis	8
9	(Albania) Vilfor Hysa	Teuta	8
9	(Albania) Erjon Rizvanolli	Shkumbini	8
