= Vladimir Miljković =

Serbian footballer

Personal information
- Full name: Vladimir Miljković
- Date of birth: 1 July 1984 (age 42)
- Place of birth: Vranje, SFR Yugoslavia
- Height: 1.78 m (5 ft 10 in)
- Position: Midfielder

Senior career*
Years	Team	Apps	(Gls)
2002–2007	Red Star Belgrade	0	(0)
2002–2003	→ Jedinstvo Ub (loan)	14	(1)
2004	→ Bežanija (loan)	26	(4)
2005	→ Radnički Obrenovac (loan)	15	(1)
2005–2006	→ Napredak Kruševac (loan)	8	(0)
2006	→ Srem (loan)	1	(0)
2007	→ Voždovac (loan)	3	(0)
2007	Zemun	7	(0)
2008–2009	Modriča	36	(2)
2010	Dečić	14	(0)
2011	Napredak Kruševac	27	(0)
2012	Smederevo	0	(0)
- * Club domestic league appearances and goals

Vladimir Miljković (Serbian Cyrillic: Владимир Миљковић; born 1 July 1984) is a Serbian retired football midfielder.
