= Edi Çajku =

Albanian footballer

Personal information
- Full name: Endri Çajku
- Date of birth: 25 February 1982 (age 44)
- Place of birth: Korçë, Albania
- Position: Midfielder

Youth career
- –2000: Skënderbeu Korçë

Senior career*
Years	Team	Apps	(Gls)
2000–2010	Skënderbeu		
2008	→ Partizani (loan)	0	(0)
2010–2012	Pogradeci	20+	(0+)
- * Club domestic league appearances and goals

Endri Çajku (born 25 February 1982, in Korçë) is an Albanian retired footballer who played for Skënderbeu Korçë, Partizani Tirana and Pogradeci during his career.

== Honours ==
KS Pogradeci

- Albanian First Division (1): 2010–11
