= Miliam Guerrib =

Croatian footballer

Milan Guerrib
Personal information
- Full name: Miliam Guerrib
- Date of birth: 5 November 1985 (age 40)
- Place of birth: Rijeka, SR Croatia, SFR Yugoslavia
- Height: 1.85 m (6 ft 1 in)
- Position: Striker

Team information
- Current team: SV Sedda Bad Schallerbach
- Number: 9

Youth career
- 1998–2004: Zamet Rijeka

Senior career*
Years	Team	Apps	(Gls)
2004	Zamet Rijeka		
2005	Opatija		
2006	Lokomotiva Rijeka		
2006–2007	Opatija		
2007–2008	Krk		
2008–2009	Crikvenica	21	(10)
2009–2010	Skënderbeu Korçë	28	(11)
2010	Kastrioti	0	(0)
2010–2011	Jadran Poreč	21	(12)
2011–2012	Deutschlandsberger SC	28	(31)
2012	Grazer AK	14	(6)
2013	Ritzing	9	(1)
2013–2014	SV Bad Goisern	28	(23)
2014–2015	Wels	34	(28)
2015–	SV sedda Bad Schallerbach	154	(128)
- * Club domestic league appearances and goals as of 27 July 2022

Miliam Guerrib (born 5 November 1985 in Rijeka) is a Croatian football player who currently is playing with SV Sedda Bad Schallerbach in the OÖ Liga.
