= Sulejman Hoxha =

Albanian footballer (born 1990)

Personal information
- Date of birth: 13 February 1990 (age 36)
- Place of birth: Durrës, Albania
- Height: 1.90 m (6 ft 3 in)
- Position: Goalkeeper

Youth career
- 2005–2007: Dinamo Tirana

Senior career*
Years	Team	Apps	(Gls)
2007–2009	Dinamo Tirana	2	(0)
2007–2008	→ Erzeni (loan)	20	(0)
2009–2011	Apolonia	26	(0)
2011–2012	Pogradeci	7	(0)
2012–2013	Teuta	2	(0)
2013–2014	Partizani	2	(0)
2014–2015	Paniliakos	0	(0)
2015	Dubnica	0	(0)
2015–2017	Erzeni	39	(0)
2017–2019	Klub Kosova Hamburg	45	(0)
2019–2022	Meiendorfer SV	38	(0)
2022–2023	FC Türkiye Wilhelmsburg		
2023	SC V/W 04 Billstedt	4	(0)

International career
2005–2006	Albania U17	3	(0)
2007–2008	Albania U19	6	(0)
2009	Albania U21	0	(0)
- * Club domestic league appearances and goals as of 11 November 2022

Sulejman Hoxha (born 13 February 1990) is an Albanian footballer who plays as a goalkeeper.

== Career ==
A product of the Dinamo Tirana academy, Hoxha was loaned out to Albanian First Division side KF Erzeni Shijak for the 2007–08 season in order to gain first-team experience. During his loan spell, he made 20 league appearances but was unable to help the club survive relegation, as they dropped below, by a single point. In June 2008 he had an unsuccessful trial with German club 1860 Munich, before returning to his parent club Dinamo Tirana and joining the first team there for the first time. Following a suspension for first choice goalkeeper Elvis Kotorri, Hoxha made his debut for Dinamo Tirana on 4 February 2009 in a local derby game against Partizani Tirana. Hoxha played the full 90 minutes but failed to keep a clean sheet in the 1–0 loss.

Hoxha left Dinamo in the summer of 2009 and joined fellow Albanian Superliga side Apolonia Fier where he became the team's first choice goalkeeper following the departure of Erjon Dine. During the 2009–10 season he made 22 league appearances but the club finished in penultimate place and were subsequently relegated to the Albanian First Division, the second time he had experiences relegation in his career. He remained at the club despite relegation but eventually left to join newly promoted Albanian Superliga side KS Pogradeci in July 2010. He was the club's second choice goalkeeper behind the Macedonian Ilce Petrovski and he made nine appearances in total, seven of which came in the league. He experienced relegation for the third time as Pogradeci finished in penultimate place.

Hoxha then joined Teuta Durrës for the 2012–13 season but he was once again second choice, this time behind Bledjan Rizvani. He managed seven appearances throughout the season but only two came in the league. In the summer of 2013 he joined newly promoted side Partizani Tirana where he was Alban Hoxha's understudy in goal.
