= Nedim Halilović =

Bosnian footballer (born 1979)

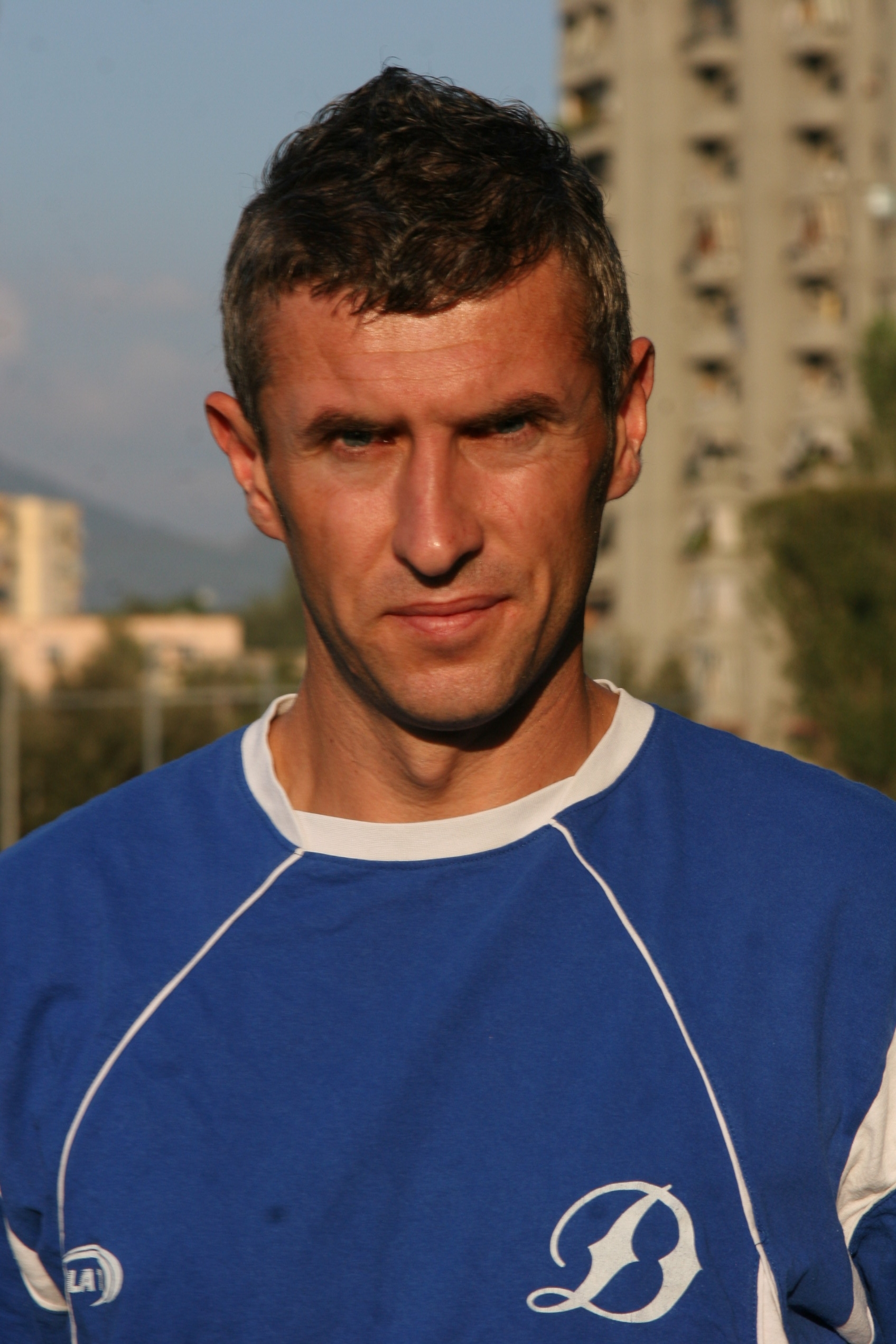
- Halilović with Dinamo Tirana

Personal information
- Date of birth: 1 July 1979 (age 47)
- Place of birth: Brčko, SFR Yugoslavia
- Height: 1.85 m (6 ft 1 in)
- Position: Forward

Senior career*
| Years | Team | Apps | (Gls) |
| 1998–1999 | Zmaj od Bosne | | |
| 1999–2000 | Istra | 1 | (0) |
| 2000–2001 | Sloboda Tuzla | | |
| 2001–2006 | Varteks | 124 | (20) |
| 2006–2008 | Örebro | 36 | (11) |
| 2008 | Rijeka | 1 | (0) |
| 2008–2009 | Dinamo Tirana | 12 | (0) |
| 2009–2011 | Dalkurd | 63 | (26) |
| 2012 | Novi Marof | | |
| 2012 | Međimurje | | |
| 2013 | Stinatz | 15 | (2) |
| 2013-2014 | Ollersdorf | 33 | (11) |

International career
| 2001–2006 | Bosnia and Herzegovina | 14 | (0) |
- * Club domestic league appearances and goals

Nedim Halilović (born 1 July 1979) is a Bosnian former professional footballer who played as a forward. He made 14 appearances for the Bosnia and Herzegovina national team.

== Club career ==
Halilović was born in Brčko. He played for NK Varteks in the Croatian First League. Prior to this, Halilović was active in the Premier League of Bosnia and Herzegovina for FK Sloboda Tuzla. Although Halilovic does not get many starts for the national team of Bosnia and Herzegovina because of his struggling lately he is quickly getting more impressive. He currently plays for the Swedish club Örebro SK and will leave for HNK Rijeka when the transfer window opens again.

On 6 June 2008, it was reported that he left Örebro SK for Croatian HNK Rijeka.

At the end of August 2008, Halilovic decided to follow his last coach at NK Rijeka, Zlatko Dalić to Dinamo Tirana, in Albania, where he signed a contract for the next two years with the 2007–08 Albanian champions.

In early 2009, he signed a two-year contract with Swedish Div II side, Dalkurd FF, playing in the fourth tier of the Swedish league, guiding the club to promotion in his first season. He finished his career in the Austrian lower leagues.

== International career ==
Halilović made his debut for Bosnia and Herzegovina in a June 2001 friendly match against Malaysia and has earned a total of 14 caps, scoring no goals. His final international was a May 2006 friendly against Iran.
