= Danilo Nikolić (footballer) =

Serbian footballer

Danilo Nikolić Данило Николић
Personal information
- Full name: Danilo Nikolić
- Date of birth: July 29, 1983 (age 43)
- Place of birth: Belgrade, SFR Yugoslavia
- Height: 1.89 m (6 ft 2 in)
- Position: Defender

Senior career*
Years	Team	Apps	(Gls)
2001–2008	Bežanija	71	(2)
2004	→ BPI Pekar (loan)	12	(0)
2006	→ Budućnost Dobanovci (loan)	11	(1)
2008–2009	Dinamo Tirana	19	(0)
2009–2011	OFK Beograd	38	(1)
2011	Karabükspor	12	(0)
2012	Elazığspor	0	(0)
2012–2014	Hapoel Haifa	35	(1)
2014–2015	Voždovac	20	(1)
2016	Akzhayik	16	(0)
2017	OFK Beograd	9	(0)
2017–2019	Proleter Novi Sad	27	(0)
2019–2021	Brodarac	15	(2)
2021–2023	Hajduk Divoš		
- * Club domestic league appearances and goals as of 27 November 2019

Danilo Nikolić (Serbian Cyrillic: Данило Николић; born 29 July 1983) is a Serbian retired footballer.

He came after a season spent in Albanian Superliga club Dinamo Tirana. He made his debut for FK Bežanija in 2001. In August 2008 he signed a contract with Albanian champions Dinamo Tirana. After one season there, he returned to Serbia signing with OFK Beograd.
