= Sebino Plaku =

Albanian footballer (born 1985)

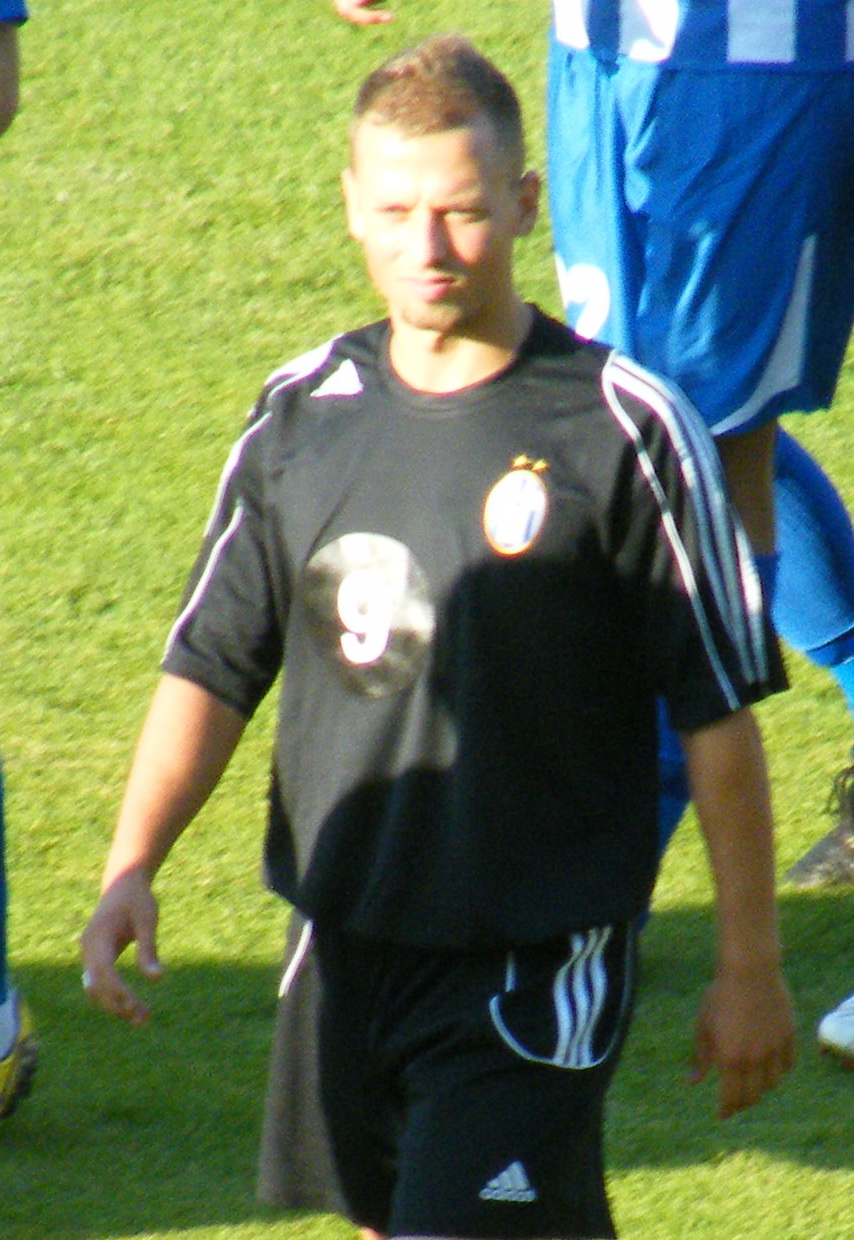
- Plaku with Tirana in 2010

Personal information
- Full name: Sebino Plaku
- Date of birth: 20 May 1985 (age 41)
- Place of birth: Tirana, Albania
- Height: 1.76 m (5 ft 9 in)
- Position: Forward

Team information
- Current team: Tirana (assistant)

Youth career
- 2000–2003: Partizani

Senior career*
Years	Team	Apps	(Gls)
2003	Partizani	10	(0)
2003–2004	Besëlidhja	10	(2)
2004–2005	Laçi	5	(0)
2005–2007	Apolonia	50	(21)
2007–2009	Dinamo Tirana	44	(27)
2008	→ HamKam (loan)	2	(0)
2009–2010	Tirana	30	(7)
2011	Flamurtari	16	(7)
2011–2012	Kastrioti	12	(3)
2012–2013	Skënderbeu	37	(13)
2013–2015	Śląsk Wrocław	29	(0)
2014	Śląsk Wrocław II	6	(5)
2015	Partizani	8	(1)
2016–2017	Skënderbeu	14	(3)
2016	→ Korabi (loan)	16	(4)
2017–2018	Kamza	31	(13)
2018	Kukësi	0	(0)
2018–2019	Kamza	21	(4)
2019	Llapi	15	(2)
2020	Gjilani	9	(4)
2020–2021	Kastrioti	10	(2)
2021–2022	KF Teuta	34	(3)

International career
2001–2002	Albania U17	3	(0)
2003–2004	Albania U19	3	(0)

Managerial career
- 2022–2023: Tirana U15
- 2023: Tirana (assistant)
- 2023–2024: Partizani (assistant)
- 2024–2025: Ballkani (assistant)
- 2026–: Tirana (assistant)
- * Club domestic league appearances and goals

Sebino Plaku (born 20 May 1985) is an Albanian former professional footballer who played as a striker.

== Club career ==
=== Early career ===
Plaku joined the Partizani academy as a teenager and was eventually promoted to the first team ahead of the 2003–04 season, where he made six Kategoria Superiore appearances in the first half of the season. He scored his first senior goal on 11 October in an Albanian Cup game against Fushë Mbreti that finished 6–0 to Partizani. He scored another goal in the next round of the Albanian Cup in a 6–1 win over Kastrioti. In January 2004, Plaku was loaned out to Besëlidhja in the Kategoria e Parë for the remainder of the season in order to gain more first team experience, where he scored twice in the Kategoria e Parë as he helped Besëlidhja to a comfortable mid table finish. He returned to Partizani at the end of the season but did not manage to break through into the first team, making only four appearances in the first half of the 2004–05 season before joining Superiore strugglers Laçi in January, where he also struggled, and was eventually relegated after finishing in last place.

=== Apolonia ===
He left Laçi following their relegation from the Kategoria Superiore and joined Apolonia in the Kategoria e Parë ahead of the 2005–06 season, where he scored 9 league goals to help his side finish second and achieve promotion to the Superiore. He also scored twice in the second round of the Albanian Cup against Telepena, taking his goal tally for the season to 11. He scored a penalty on the opening day of his return to the Superiore against his former club Partizani, but his side lost the game 3–2. He scored 15 league goals in 26 games, making him the third top goalscorer in the Superiore behind Vioresin Sinani and Daniel Xhafaj, but could not help his side avoid finishing in last place as he experienced relegation for the second time in his career.

=== Dinamo Tirana ===
Plaku joined Dinamo Tirana in the 2007–08 season where he found immediate success in front of goal, scoring 8 times in 16 appearances. He scored a penalty once again in the opening game of the season against a former club of his, this time being Besëlidhja. He scored once again two rounds later in a 4–0 win over Kastrioti as well as scoring the winner the following week against Teuta. On the final day of the first half of the season, he struck once again in a 7–0 thrashing of Skënderbeu, scoring twice in the opening 7 minutes in a game where his prolific strike partner Pero Pejić grabbed four goals. Following a prolific first half to the 2007–08 season with Dinamo Tirana, where he scored 9 league goals in 16 games, he moved to Norwegian side Ham-Kam for an undisclosed fee in January 2008.

He returned at Dinamo in the summer of 2008 where he won the Albanian Supercup over Vllaznia, his first career silverware. In the 2008–09 season, Plaku enjoyed his best season, netting 20 goals across all competitions, including 18 in league, setting a new personal best.

=== Tirana ===
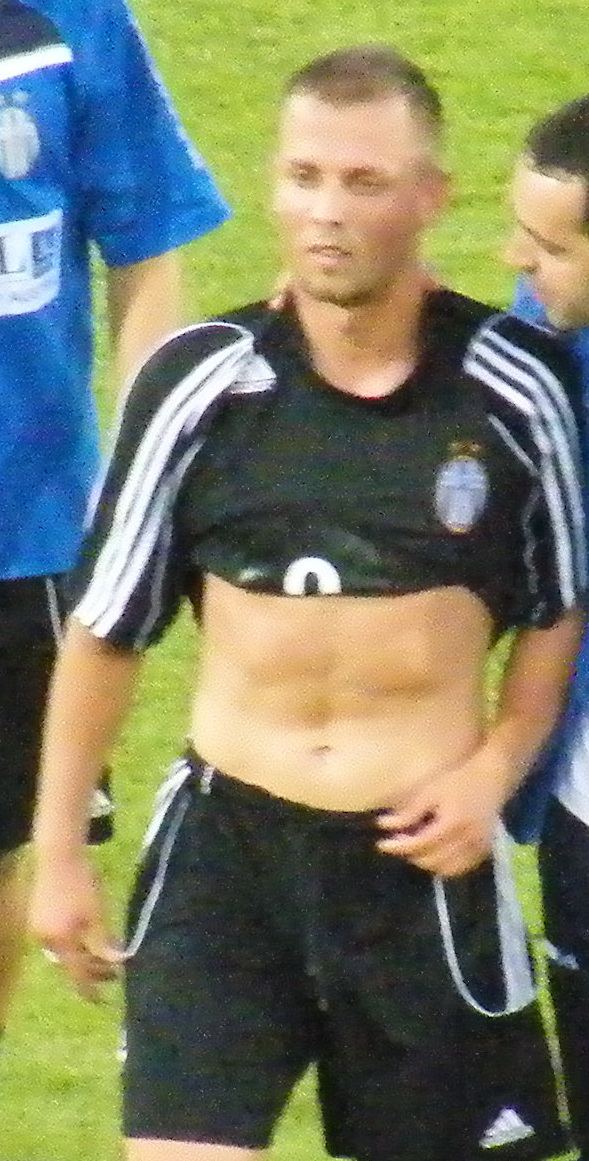
Plaku during his time at Tirana

In January 2010, during the winter transfer window, Plaku completed a move to Tirana for €30,000, taking the vacant number 9 for the second part of 2009–10 season. He made his competitive debut on 25 January coincidentally against his former employers Dinamo Tirana, playing for 76-minute as 8-man Tirana suffered a 1–2 defeat at Qemal Stafa Stadium.

=== Flamurtari ===
On 18 January 2011, Plaku completed a transfer to title challengers Flamurtari for €20,000. He debuted with the team three days later in the 2–1 away win over Kastrioti. Plaku scored his maiden Flamurtari goal in his third appearance for the club on 13 February in the 2–0 home win over Vllaznia. Later on 5 March, Plaku scored a brace in Flamurtari's 8–0 thrashing of Elbasani, thus recording the biggest win of Superiore era. During the second part of 2010–11 season, Plaku scored 7 times in 16 league appearances as the team missed out the championship to Skënderbeu.

He was released by the Flamurtari chairman Shpëtim Gjika on 19 July 2011, along with three other main players, Daniel Xhafaj, Bledar Devolli and Julian Ahmataj.

=== Skënderbeu ===
On 7 January 2012, Plaku was signed by fellow Kategoria Superiore side Skënderbeu for a fee of €10,000. He made his competitive debut against Flamurtari on 31 January by scoring the last goal of the match in the 82nd minute to help the team to win the match 4–1. On 7 March 2012, Plaku scored his second goal of campaign in a 1–1 draw away against Vllaznia. Three days later, in a match against Shkumbini, Plaku scored his first brace to give the team a 4–2 win away.

He was one of the most important players in the team's progress in the Albanian Cup where he scored again in a match against Kastrioti on 4 April 2012. His next goal for Skënderbeu came on 25 April during the 2–1 home win against Vllaznia. Only four days later, he received his first red card with Skënderbeu's colours in a goalless draw against Bylis.

Plaku begun the new campaign on 17 July 2012 by scoring his first goal in the European competitions, netting with a right-foot shot inside the box to give his team a 1–0 win at home versus Debreceni in the first of Champions League second qualifying round. In the returning leg however, the team lost 0–3 and was eliminated on aggregate.

=== Śląsk Wrocław ===
On 30 June 2013, Plaku was transferred in Poland where he signed with Ekstraklasa side Śląsk Wrocław. He made his debut for Śląsk Wrocław against Rudar, contributing with a goal in a 4–0 home win.

=== Partzani ===
He agreed personal terms with Partizani president Gaz Demi on 8 June 2015 and signed a one-year contract with the club, with the option of a further one–year renewal. He made his second debut with Partizani against Norwegian side Strømsgodset in the first qualifying round of the Europa League on 2 July 2015, in a game which ended in a 3–1 loss for his side. He scored his first two goals of the season in the Albanian Cup against Korabi in a 5–0 win, and just a few days later on 19 September he scored his first league of the season against Kukësi.

A month later he scored another brace in the Albanian Cup, this time against Lushnja, but he struggled to cement his place in the first team and he did not score again in the first half of the season. With the arrival of new coach Andrea Agostinelli, Plaku was deemed surplus to requirements as the club had Xhevahir Sukaj, Stevan Račić and Astrit Fazliu as forward options, and on 2 January 2016 it was announced that his contract was terminated through mutual consent. He left the club after a disappointing spell, where he was largely out of favour and managed to find the net just once in 8 league games, despite scoring four goals in two Albanian Cup games, all of which, however, came against lower league opposition.

=== Return to Skënderbeu ===
Plaku became a free agent in January 2016 and attracted both domestic and international interest for his services, but on 15 January he rejoined his previous club Skënderbeu and flew out to Marbella, Spain to link up with the rest of the squad on their winter training camp.

==== Loan at Korabi ====
On 31 August 2016, on the deadline day, Plaku was sent on loan at newly promoted side Korabi on a long-season deal. He made his competitive debut seven days later by playing in the second half of the goalless draw against Laçi in the first week of the 2016–17 season. On 17 September, during the league match against Luftëtari, Plaku missed a penalty kick, wasting the opportunity to score Korabi's first ever goal in Albanian Superliga, as hosts won 1–0 at Elbasan Arena. However, he accomplished the feat in the matchday 5 against Teuta, scoring inside 30 seconds after dribbling Shpëtim Moçka to lead the club to its first ever win in Albanian top flight.

On 16 October, Plaku had another unlucky match as he hit the crossbar twice in an eventual 2–0 away defeat to Kukësi. In the matchday 15, Plaku scored against Tirana, rescuing his side a point. On 22 December, in the final match of 2016, Plaku scored the lone goal as Korabi defeated Flamurtari at home to end the year with a consolation win. The team finished the first part of the season in the last position with 11 points from 18 games, far from the club's initial goals, which led Plaku to terminate its cooperation with club. In total, Plaku scored four goals in 16 league appearances for the team.

==== Return from loan ====
On 5 January 2017, Ilir Daja, who was appointed the new coach of Skënderbeu two days earlier, ordered the return of Plaku in the team to increase the rivality in attack. During the second part of 2016–17 season, Plaku played mostly second-fiddle to Hamdi Salihi and James Adeniyi. He made 7 appearances and scored only one goal, which came on 27 May in the final matchday of championship against Partizani as Skënderbeu failed to win the title for the first time in six years.

In the summer of 2017, Plaku was the golden substitution in Skënderbeu's 2017–18 UEFA Europa League qualifying rounds campaign, as the team achieved group stage for the second time ever and also become the first Albanian club to pass four rounds. He made four appearances during the qualifying rounds, only one as starter, collecting 195 minutes and scoring twice. His first goal, a chip from outside the zone, sealed the 2–0 home win against Kairat on 20 July as Skënderbeu won 2–0 and progressed 3–1 on aggregate. Later on 3 August in the returning leg of third qualifying round versus Mladá Boleslav, he again came off the bench to score a late winner as Skënderbeu won 2–1 at Elbasan Arena. The first match finished 2–1 but for the opposite side which sent the match to penalty shootout where Skënderbeu emerged victorious.

He left the club on controversial fashion in the first days of September 2017 after falling out with manager Daja. He commented his departure by saying: "I will not forget the person who fought me."

=== Kamza ===
On 5 September 2017, Plaku joined newly promoted top flight side Kamza as a free agent after club president Naim Qarri convinced Skënderbeu's president Takaj to do so. The transfer was made official one day later with the player signing a contract for the upcoming season. He was also promoted as team captain for the 2017–18 season. He made his first appearance of the season on 9 September in the opening matchday of championship at Kukësi. His first score-sheet contributions came later on 30 October in form of a later winner against Laçi to lift Kamza to 4th place. Before the match, he decided to hand over his captaincy to veteran goalkeeper Argjent Halili.

In the matchday 10 against Kukësi, Plaku scored a brace, including a first-half spectacular long-range strike to rescue his side a point. He bagged 4 goals in 5 matches in November to earn Albanian Superliga Player of the Month award, becoming the first Kamza player to win it.

In the 2017–18 season, Plaku played 31 league games and scored 13 goals, his highest tally since the 2008–09 season. Kamza retained their top flight spot only by winning in the final game against Partizani.

=== Kukësi ===
On 13 June 2018, Kukësi announced to have signed Plaku on a short-term for their UEFA Champions League campaign.

=== Llapi ===
In June 2019, Plaku joined Football Superleague of Kosovo club KF Llapi.

== International career ==
Plaku has been a former Albania youth international player, representing under-17 and under-19 side. He made his official debut with under-17 squad on 24 September 2001 during the 5–2 away loss to Croatia.

== Career statistics ==
As of 23 May 2018

Appearances and goals by club, season and competition
Club	Season	League			Cup		Continental		Other		Total	
Club	Season	Division	Apps	Goals	Apps	Goals	Apps	Goals	Apps	Goals	Apps	Goals
Partizani	2003–04	Kategoria Superiore	10	0	0	0	—		—		10	0
Besëlidhja (loan)	2003–04	Kategoria e Parë	10	2	0	0	—		—		10	2
Partizani	2004–05	Kategoria Superiore	4	0	0	0	—		—		4	0
Laçi	2004–05	Kategoria Superiore	5	0	0	0	—		—		5	0
Apolonia	2005–06	Kategoria e Parë	28	6	0	0	—		—		28	6
Apolonia	2005–06	Kategoria Superiore	22	15	0	0	—		—		22	15
Apolonia	Total		50	21	0	0	—		—		50	21
Dinamo Tirana	2007–08	Kategoria Superiore	16	8	0	0	—		—		16	8
Dinamo Tirana	2008–09	Kategoria Superiore	29	18	5	2	0	0	1 (Note: Appearance in Albanian Supercup)	0	35	20
Dinamo Tirana	2009–10	Kategoria Superiore	16	2	3	2	2 (Note: Appearance(s) in UEFA Europa League)	0	—		21	4
Dinamo Tirana	Total		61	28	8	4	2	0	1	0	72	32
Tirana	2009–10	Kategoria Superiore	15	4	2	1	—		—		17	5
Tirana	2010–11	Kategoria Superiore	15	3	0	0	4	0	—		19	3
Tirana	Total		30	7	2	1	4	0	—		36	8
Flamurtari	2010–11	Kategoria Superiore	16	7	0	0	—		—		16	7
Kastrioti	2011–12	Kategoria Superiore	12	3	1	0	—		—		13	3
Skënderbeu	2011–12	Kategoria Superiore	12	3	7	3	—		—		19	6
Skënderbeu	2012–13	Kategoria Superiore	25	10	7	6	2 (Note: Appearance(s) in UEFA Champions League)	1	1	1	35	18
Skënderbeu	Total		37	13	14	9	2	1	1	1	54	24
Śląsk Wrocław	2013–14	Ekstraklasa	26	1	2	0	6	2	—		34	3
Śląsk Wrocław	2014–15	Ekstraklasa	3	0	0	0	—		—		3	0
Śląsk Wrocław	Total		29	1	2	0	6	2	—		37	3
Śląsk Wrocław II	2014–15	III liga Lower S.–Lub.	6	5	—		—		—		6	5
Partizani	2015–16	Kategoria Superiore	8	1	2	4	2	0	—		12	5
Skënderbeu	2015–16	Kategoria Superiore	7	2	3	1	—		—		10	3
Skënderbeu	2016–17	Kategoria Superiore	7	1	2	0	—		1	0	10	1
Skënderbeu	2017–18	Kategoria Superiore	—		—		4	2	—		4	2
Skënderbeu	Total		14	3	5	1	4	2	1	0	24	6
Korabi (loan)	2016–17	Kategoria Superiore	16	4	0	0	—		—		16	4
Kamza	2017–18	Kategoria Superiore	31	13	1	1	—		—		32	14
Kukësi	2018–19	Kategoria Superiore	0	0	0	0	0	0	—		0	0
Career total			339	108	35	20	20	5	3	1	397	134

== Honours ==
Partizani

- Albanian Cup: 2003–04

Dinamo Tirana

- Albanian Supercup: 2008

Tirana

- Albanian Cup: 2010–11
- Albanian Supercup: 2011

Skënderbeu

- Kategoria Superiore: 2011–12, 2012–13, 2015–16

KF Teuta

- Kategoria Superiore: 2020–21
- Albanian Supercup: 2021

Individual

- Albanian Superliga Player of the Month: November 2017
