= Klodian Sulollari =

Albanian footballer

Personal information
- Date of birth: 27 July 1989 (age 37)
- Place of birth: Tirana, Albania
- Height: 1.87 m (6 ft 2 in)
- Position: Centre back

Youth career
- –2008: Dinamo Tirana

Senior career*
Years	Team	Apps	(Gls)
2008–2011	Dinamo Tirana	2	(0)
2008	→ Mamurrasi (loan)		
2009–2010	→ Liria Prizren (loan)		
2010	→ Bylis (loan)	7	(0)
2011	→ Gramshi (loan)		
2011	→ Ballkani (loan)		
2012–2014	Tërbuni	35	(1)
2014–2015	Mamurrasi	21	(1)
2015–2016	Tërbuni	18	(0)

International career
2008	Albania U17	3	(0)
- * Club domestic league appearances and goals

Klodian Sulollari (born 27 July 1989) is an Albanian former professional footballer who played as a centre-back. He played for Bylis, Dinamo Tirana and Tërbuni Pukë in the Albanian Superliga.
