= Julian Ahmataj =

Albanian footballer and manager (born 1979)

Personal information
- Date of birth: 24 May 1979 (age 47)
- Place of birth: Elbasan, PSR Albania
- Height: 1.79 m (5 ft 10 in)
- Positions: Defender; midfielder

Team information
- Current team: Skënderbeu (manager)

Youth career
- 1995–1997: KF Elbasani

Senior career*
Years	Team	Apps	(Gls)
1997–1998	Elbasani	35	(1)
1998–1999	Bylis	20	(2)
1999–2002	Dinamo Tirana	82	(10)
2002–2003	Teuta	11	(1)
2003–2004	Dinamo Tirana	17	(3)
2004–2005	Partizani	17	(1)
2005–2006	Elbasani	32	(7)
2006–2008	Dinamo Tirana	62	(10)
2008–2009	Elbasani	49	(8)
2009–2010	Tirana	30	(3)
2010–2011	Flamurtari	29	(7)
2011–2013	Tirana	41	(1)
2013–2015	Teuta	46	(1)

International career
2001	Albania U21	4	(0l)
2002–2003	Albania	2	(0)

Managerial career
- 2016: Teuta
- 2016: Bylis
- 2016–2017: Besa
- 2017: Korabi
- 2018: Burreli
- 2018: Kamza
- 2019: Luftëtari
- 2019: Flamurtari
- 2019: Tirana U-17
- 2019: Tirana
- 2020–2021: Skënderbeu
- 2022–2023: Tirana U-19
- 2023–2024: Tirana
- 2024–2026: Albania U-19
- 2026–: Skënderbeu
- * Club domestic league appearances and goals

Julian Ahmataj (born 24 May 1979) is an Albanian football coach and a former player who is the current manager of Skënderbeu. He usually played on the left side of the defence or the midfield but could also play in the centre as both a defender and a midfielder.

== Flamurtari ==
He was released by the Flamurtari chairman Shpëtim Gjika on 19 July 2011, along with three other main players, Daniel Xhafaj, Sebino Plaku and Bledar Devolli.

== National team statistics ==
Albania national team
Year	Apps	Goals
2002	1	0
2003	1	0
Total	2	0
