= Gers Delia =

Albanian footballer

Personal information
- Date of birth: 2 June 1992 (age 34)
- Place of birth: Albania
- Height: 1.82 m (6 ft 0 in)
- Position: Forward

Youth career
- Dinamo Tirana

Senior career*
Years	Team	Apps	(Gls)
2010–2011	Dinamo Tirana	3	(1)
2011–2012	Żejtun	20	(5)
2012–2013	Delémont	8	(2)
2013	FC Bassecourt	11	(3)
2013–2014	Laufen	7	(1)
2014–2016	Hutthurm	9	(1)
2017	Delémont	0	(0)

International career
2008–2009	Albania U17	3	(0)
2010–2011	Albania U19	3	(0)
2012–2013	Albania U21	2	(0)
- * Club domestic league appearances and goals

Gersi Delia (born 2 June 1992) is an Albanian former footballer.
