= Daniel Bertoya =

Argentine footballer

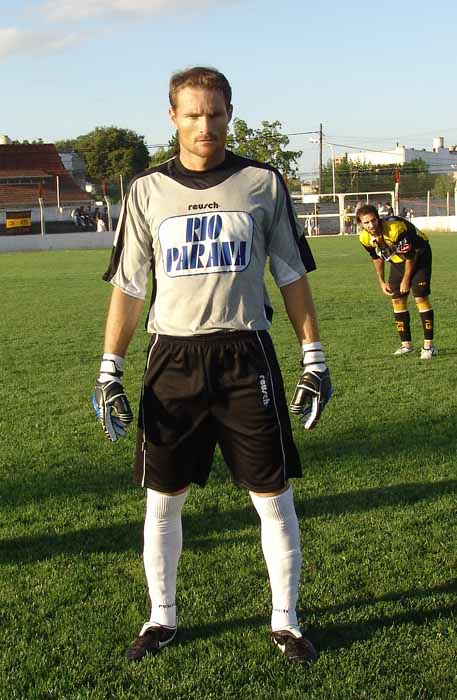

Personal information
- Full name: Daniel Alejandro Bertoya
- Date of birth: 13 April 1975 (age 51)
- Place of birth: Armstrong, Argentina
- Height: 1.82 m (6 ft 0 in)
- Position: Goalkeeper

Senior career*
Years	Team	Apps	(Gls)
2001–2002	Tucumán		
2003–2004	Aldosivi		
2004–2007	Ben Hur		
2007–2008	Defensa y Justicia		
2008	Dinamo Tirana	0	(0)
2008–2010	Santamarina		
2010–2011	Juventud Antoniana		
2011–2015	Santamarina		
- * Club domestic league appearances and goals

Daniel Alejandro Bertoya (born 13 April 1975) is an Argentine retired footballer who played as a goalkeeper. He has played in Europe with Albanian side Dinamo Tirana in 2008.
