= Ilirjan Çaushaj =

Albanian footballer

Personal information
- Full name: Ilirjan Çaushaj
- Date of birth: 18 March 1987 (age 39)
- Place of birth: Përmet, Albania
- Position: Midfielder

Team information
- Current team: Shënkolli

Senior career*
Years	Team	Apps	(Gls)
2006–2007	Dinamo Tirana	25	(0)
2008	Teuta	14	(1)
2008–2009	Flamurtari	28	(4)
2009–2010	Shkumbini	28	(8)
2010–2012	Tomori	23	(3)
2012–2013	Skënderbeu	17	(2)
2013–2014	Tirana	11	(0)
2014	Kerkyra	5	(0)
2014	Besa	8	(0)
2015	Sopoti	10	(3)
2015	Adriatiku	4	(0)
2016	Turbina	7	(4)
2016–	Shënkolli		
- * Club domestic league appearances and goals as of 19 February 2014

Ilirjan Çaushaj (born 18 March 1987) is an Albanian footballer who currently plays as a midfielder for Shënkolli.

He played for several years in the Albanian Superliga.
