= Endri Bakiu =

Albanian footballer

Personal information
- Date of birth: 6 November 1987 (age 39)
- Place of birth: Tirana, Albania
- Height: 1.73 m (5 ft 8 in)
- Position: Attacking midfielder

Team information
- Current team: Turbina Cërrik
- Number: 15

Youth career
- –2006: Dinamo Tirana

Senior career*
Years	Team	Apps	(Gls)
2006	Dinamo Tirana	0	(0)
2007–2009	Bylis	38+	(17)
2009–2010	Shkumbini	32	(2)
2010–2011	Elbasani	21	(5)
2011–2012	Tomori	25	(19)
2012–2014	Bylis	41	(8)
2014–2015	Kastrioti	24	(8)
2015–2016	Dinamo Tirana	22	(1)
2016	Sopoti	10	(2)
2017–	Turbina Cërrik	27	(4)
- * Club domestic league appearances and goals as of 29 December 2018

Endri Bakiu (born 6 November 1987) is an Albanian professional footballer who plays as an attacking midfielder for Turbina Cërrik in the Albanian First Division.

== Club career ==
On 28 June 2010, Bakiu agreed personal terms and signed a one-year contract with Elbasani.

On 5 September 2015, Bakiu completed a transfer to Dinamo Tirana as a free agent, returning to his first club after 9 years.

On 27 January 2017, after a controversial departure from Sopoti, Bakiu joined fellow Albanian First Division side Turbina Cërrik on their bid to escape relegation.
