= Pëllumb Jusufi =

Croatian-Macedonian footballer

Personal information
- Date of birth: 10 February 1988 (age 38)
- Place of birth: Tetovo, SR Macedonia, SFR Yugoslavia
- Height: 1.75 m (5 ft 9 in)
- Positions: Attacking midfielder; forward

Team information
- Current team: NK Cres
- Number: 8

Youth career
- –2000: NK Cres
- 2000–2006: Dinamo Zagreb

Senior career*
Years	Team	Apps	(Gls)
2007	Bonifika	11	(1)
2007–2008	Domžale	2	(0)
2008–2009	Dinamo Tirana	20	(2)
2009–2010	Kastrioti	29	(0)
2010–2011	Hrvatski Dragovoljac	14	(0)
2011	→ Gorica	11	(2)
2011	Vysočina	1	(0)
2012	Shkëndija	3	(0)
2012	Tomori	5	(0)
2013	Cres	11	(13)
2013–2014	FC Jazz	31	(11)
2014–2015	Renova	4	(0)
2015–2016	MuSa	33	(13)
2016	Poprad	9	(1)
2017–	Cres	39	(11)

International career^{‡}
2004–2006	Croatia U17	19	(1)
2006	Croatia U18	2	(2)
2006–2007	Croatia U19	14	(3)
2007–2009	Croatia U21	1	(0)
- * Club domestic league appearances and goals as of 17 December 2018 ‡ National team caps and goals as of 15 June 2009

Pëllumb Jusufi (Macedonian: Пелумб Јусуфи; born 10 February 1988) is a Croatian-Macedonian football player. The midfielder currently plays for the fourth-tier NK Cres. He is of Albanian descent.

== Club career ==
=== Childhood and early career ===
Jusufi was born in Tetovo, SFR Yugoslavia to Macedonian Albanian parents from Pirok. Jusufi started playing football at the age of 7 and was mentored by his father, Isak Jusufi, a former professional footballer. Jusufi and his family moved from Tetovo to Zagreb, Croatia when he was 12 years old. In Croatia, he continued playing football and was eventually scouted by Croatian club NK Dinamo Zagreb in 2000. He started playing in the Dinamo youth team and made his way up the ranks of the club. His success in the youth division got him noticed by the Croatian Football Federation and decided to represent Croatia at youth level ahead of the country of his birth Macedonia and Albania. Whilst representing Croatia at a European football tournament in 2006, interests from Borussia Dortmund and VfB Stuttgart were noted. Jusufi was expected to sign for them, however talks broke down between both parties. Jusufi moved to the second-tier Slovenian side SC Bonifika, where he stayed for the rest of the season playing for the senior team while still being eligible for the youth squad. His impact on the team got him noticed by NK Domzale and he moved there in the summer of 2007.

=== Domžale ===
Jusufi played for the then Slovenian champions, NK Domzale. During his time in Slovenia he mainly made his appearance as a substitute off the bench. As he did not get regular first team football, Jusufi left Domzale for Dinamo Tirana, then Albanian Superliga champions. Jusufi made 2 appearances in the Champions League for NK Domzale, one of them against Dinamo Tirana's local rivals KF Tirana.

=== Dinamo Tirana ===
Jusufi played his first match for Dinamo in the Albanian Supercup against Vllaznia Shkodër. He helped Dinamo win by scoring in the 78th minute Jusufi scored twice in twenty appearances for Dinamo and at the end of the season, moved to newly promoted team, KS Kastrioti Kruje.

=== Kastrioti Kruje ===
Jusufi stayed in Kruje for one season, keeping Kastrioti Kruje in the top half of the superliga for the first time in the club's history.

=== Shkëndija ===
During the winter break of the 2011/2011 season, Jusufi moved to Macedonian Prva liga champions, KF Shkëndija.

=== FC Jazz ===
On 14 August 2013 Jusufi was signed by Finnish third-tier side FC Jazz. The connection between Jusufi and Pori based team was made by the father of Nooralotta Neziri who is a Finnish hurdler of Macedonian Albanian descent. Jusufi made 7 appearances scoring 7 goals for Jazz in 2013 Kakkonen. His team was promoted to Ykkönen after the promotion playoffs against Ekenäs IF.

== International career ==
Jusufi has represented Croatia in every youth level. Jusufi has not represented Croatia at the senior level and is therefore eligible to represent either Albania, Croatia or North Macedonia.

== Honours ==
=== Club ===
Dinamo Zagreb

- Youth league Player of the Year: 2003, 2004
- Youth league Best Scorer: 2002, 2003, 2005

Domžale

- Slovenian PrvaLiga: 2007–08

Dinamo Tirana

- Albanian Supercup: 2008
