= Cristian Campozano =

Argentine footballer (born 1985)

Personal information
- Full name: Cristian Andrés Campozano
- Date of birth: 17 June 1985 (age 41)
- Place of birth: Formosa, Argentina
- Height: 1.80 m (5 ft 11 in)
- Position: Forward

Youth career
- Estudiantes LP
- Ben Hur

Senior career*
Years	Team	Apps	(Gls)
2006–2007	Ben Hur	12	(1)
2007–2008	La Plata FC	21	(3)
2008	Dinamo Tirana	1	(0)
2009	Municipal Iquique	18	(7)
2010	Villa San Carlos	26	(9)
2010	Deportivo Morón	16	(1)
2011	Estudiantes BA	0	(0)
2011	Villa San Carlos	9	(3)
2011–2012	Central Córdoba SdE	18	(3)
2012–2013	Midland	30	(10)
2013–2014	Colegiales	25	(4)
2014–2015	San Luis	30	(5)
2015–2016	Platense	25	(4)
2016–2017	Villa San Carlos	29	(4)
2017–2018	Sportivo Patria	20	(12)
2018–2019	Crucero del Norte	15	(2)
2019	Deportivo Itapuense	–	(–)
2019–2020	Crucero del Norte	6	(1)
2020–2021	Sportivo Belgrano	6	(2)
2021	Crucero del Norte	4	(1)
2021	Deportivo Itapuense	–	(–)
2022	Crucero del Norte	19	(5)
2022–2023	San Martín Mendoza	11	(4)
2023	Guaraní Antonio Franco	–	(–)
- * Club domestic league appearances and goals as of 21 May 2024

Cristian Andrés Campozano (born 17 June 1985) is an Argentine professional footballer who plays as a forward.

== Career ==
Campozano was born in Formosa. A product of Estudiantes de La Plata, he made his professional debut with Ben Hur. In his homeland, he has played for several clubs such as Villa San Carlos, Estudiantes BA, Central Córdoba de Santiago del Estero, Crucero del Norte, Sportivo Belgrano, among others.

Besides Argentina, he has played in Albania, Chile and Paraguay. In Albania, he played for Dinamo Tirana in Albania.

In Chile, he played for both Municipal Iquique and San Luis de Quillota.

In Paraguay, he played for Deportivo Itapuense in the Primera División B Nacional.

In October 2023, he joined Guaraní Antonio Franco.
