= Rubén Cecco =

Argentine footballer

Personal information
- Full name: Rubén Óscar Cecco
- Date of birth: 10 January 1983 (age 43)
- Place of birth: Buenos Aires, Argentina
- Height: 1.76 m (5 ft 9 in)
- Position: Attacking midfielder

Youth career
- 1997: Racing
- 1998: Quilmes
- 1999: Boca Juniors

Senior career*
Years	Team	Apps	(Gls)
1999–2002	Boca Juniors		
2002	Deportivo Saquisilí		
2002	San José		
2003	Independiente Petrolero		
2004	Fancesa		
2005	Plaza Amador		
2005	Persekabpas Pasuruan		
2006	Persma Manado		
2007	Persiraja Banda Aceh		
2007–2008	Persija Jakarta		
2008	Bella Vista	10	(3)
2009	Dinamo Tirana	11	(1)
2009	San Telmo		
2010	Sportivo Luqueño		
2010–2011	Al-Ittihad		
2012	Miramar Misiones	4	(0)
2013–2014	Ragusa Calcio		
2014–2015	Teuta Durrës		
- * Club domestic league appearances and goals as of 12 November 2019

Rubén Óscar Cecco (born 10 January 1983 in Buenos Aires) is an Argentine former professional footballer who played as a striker.

== Teams ==
- Boca Juniors 1999–2002
- Deportivo Saquisilí 2002
- San José 2002
- Independiente Petrolero 2003
- Fancesa 2004
- Plaza Amador 2005
- Persekabpas Pasuruan 2005
- Persma Manado 2006
- Persiraja Banda Aceh 2007
- Persija Jakarta 2007–2008
- Bella Vista 2008
- Dinamo Tirana 2009
- San Telmo 2009
- Sportivo Luqueño 2010
- Al-Ittihad 2010–2011
- Miramar Misiones 2012
- Ragusa Calcio 2013–2014
- Teuta Durrës 2014–2015
