= Artion Poçi =

Albanian footballer

Personal information
- Full name: Artion Poçi
- Date of birth: 23 July 1977 (age 49)
- Place of birth: Fier, Albania
- Position: Central midfielder

Youth career
- 1990–1995: Apolonia

Senior career*
Years	Team	Apps	(Gls)
1995–1999	Apolonia	88	(2)
1999–2000	Bylis	7	(0)
2000–2003	Apolonia	67	(16)
2003–2009	Dinamo Tirana	183	(21)
2009–2014	Besa	96	(8)
Total		441	(47)

International career^{‡}
2001–2002	Albania	1	(0)

Managerial career
- 2017: Besa
- * Club domestic league appearances and goals as of 19 May 2010 ‡ National team caps and goals as of 16 June 2009

Artion Poçi (born 23 July 1977 in Fier) is a retired Albanian football player.

== Playing career ==
=== International ===
He made his debut for Albania as a second-half substitute for Fatmir Vata in an April 2001 friendly match against Turkey in Gaziantep, his sole international game.

== Managerial career ==
A former player of the club, Poçi was appointed manager of Besa Kavajë in August 2017, only to be replaced by Bledar Sinella a month later in a managerial merry-go-around at the club.

== Honours ==
=== Dinamo ===
- Albanian Superliga (1): 2007–08
- Albanian Supercup (1): 2008

=== Besa ===
- Albanian Cup (1): 2009-10
