= Arjan Pisha =

Albanian footballer

Personal information
- Full name: Arjan Pisha
- Date of birth: 18 January 1977 (age 49)
- Place of birth: Elbasan, Albania
- Height: 1.83 m (6 ft 0 in)
- Position: Defender

Youth career
- Elbasani

Senior career*
Years	Team	Apps	(Gls)
1993–1999	Elbasani	119	(2)
1999–2005	Dinamo Tirana	158	(8)
2005–2007	Tirana	54	(0)
2007–2011	Dinamo Tirana	91	(1)
2011–2013	Tirana	36	(2)
2013–2015	Elbasani	28	(6)
Total		486	(19)

International career^{‡}
2003	Albania	1	(0)
- * Club domestic league appearances and goals as of 19 October 2014 ‡ National team caps and goals as of 19 October 2014

Arjan Pisha (born 18 January 1977) is an Albanian retired footballer.

== Club career ==
=== 2011-present ===
Pisha signed for KF Tirana on 2 July 2011 for his second stint at the club.

== International career ==
Pisha earned his first international cap on 15 November 2003 in a friendly against Estonia, entering in the last six minutes as Albania won 2–0 at Qemal Stafa Stadium.

== National team statistics ==
Albania national team
Year	Apps	Goals
2003	1	0
Total	1	0

== Honours ==
KF Elbasani

- Albanian First Division: 2013-14
