= Hetlem Çapja =

Albanian footballer

Personal information
- Full name: Hetlem Çapja
- Date of birth: 3 February 1983 (age 43)
- Place of birth: Elbasan, Albania
- Height: 1.81 m (5 ft 11 in)
- Position: Central midfielder

Senior career*
Years	Team	Apps	(Gls)
2002–2006	Elbasani	15+	(1+)
2007–2008	Tirana	42	(3)
2008–2009	Dinamo Tirana	23	(0)
2009	Shkumbini	15	(1)
2010–2011	Elbasani	30+	(2+)
2011	Dinamo Tirana	1	(0)
2012	Tërbuni		
2012–2013	Gramshi	10	(0)
2013	Luzi Vogël		
2013–2014	Elbasani	2	(0)

International career
2005	Albania U-21	2	(0)
- * Club domestic league appearances and goals

Hetlem Çapja (born 3 February 1983 in Elbasan) is a retired Albanian professional footballer who played as a midfielder.

== Club career ==
Çapja spend the majority of his club career representing his boyhood club Elbasani, notably winning the Albanian Superliga title in the 2005–06 season. In January 2012, he joined Tërbuni Pukë by signing until the end of 2011–12 season.

He announced his retirement from football on 6 January 2017 after being a free agent for more than two years.

== International career ==
Çapja has represented Albania at under-21 level, making his debut on 29 March 2005 against Greece, match valid for the qualifiers of 2006 UEFA European Under-21 Championship.

== Honours ==
Elbasani

- Albanian Superliga: 2005–06
- Albanian First Division: 2013–14
