= Goran Granić (footballer) =

Bosnian and Croatian football player

Personal information
- Date of birth: 9 July 1975 (age 51)
- Place of birth: Livno, SFR Yugoslavia
- Height: 1.80 m (5 ft 11 in)
- Position: Defender

Senior career*
Years	Team	Apps	(Gls)
1994–1997	Neretva		
1997	NK Zagreb	0	(0)
1997–1998	Troglav Livno		
1998–2000	Rudar Velenje	64	(4)
2000–2001	Olimpija Ljubljana	32	(2)
2001–2005	Varteks	111	(3)
2005–2006	Hajduk Split	16	(0)
2006–2007	Pomorac		
2007–2009	Dinamo Tirana	47	(0)
2009–2012	Dugopolje		

Managerial career
- 2022–2023: Posušje
- 2023–: Solin
- * Club domestic league appearances and goals

Goran Granić (born 9 July 1975) is a Bosnian and Croatian professional football manager and former player.

== Managerial statistics ==
As of 21 September 2023

Managerial record by team and tenure
Team	From	To	Record							
Team	From	To	G	W	D	L	GF	GA	GD	Win %
Posušje	29 September 2022	22 March 2023	14	4	4	6	16	19	−3	28.57
Solin	19 September 2023	–	0	0	0	0	0	0	+0	—
Total			14	4	4	6	16	19	−3	28.57
