= Selman Stërmasi Stadium =

Stadium in Tirana, Albania

Coordinates: 41.319006°N 19.811196°E

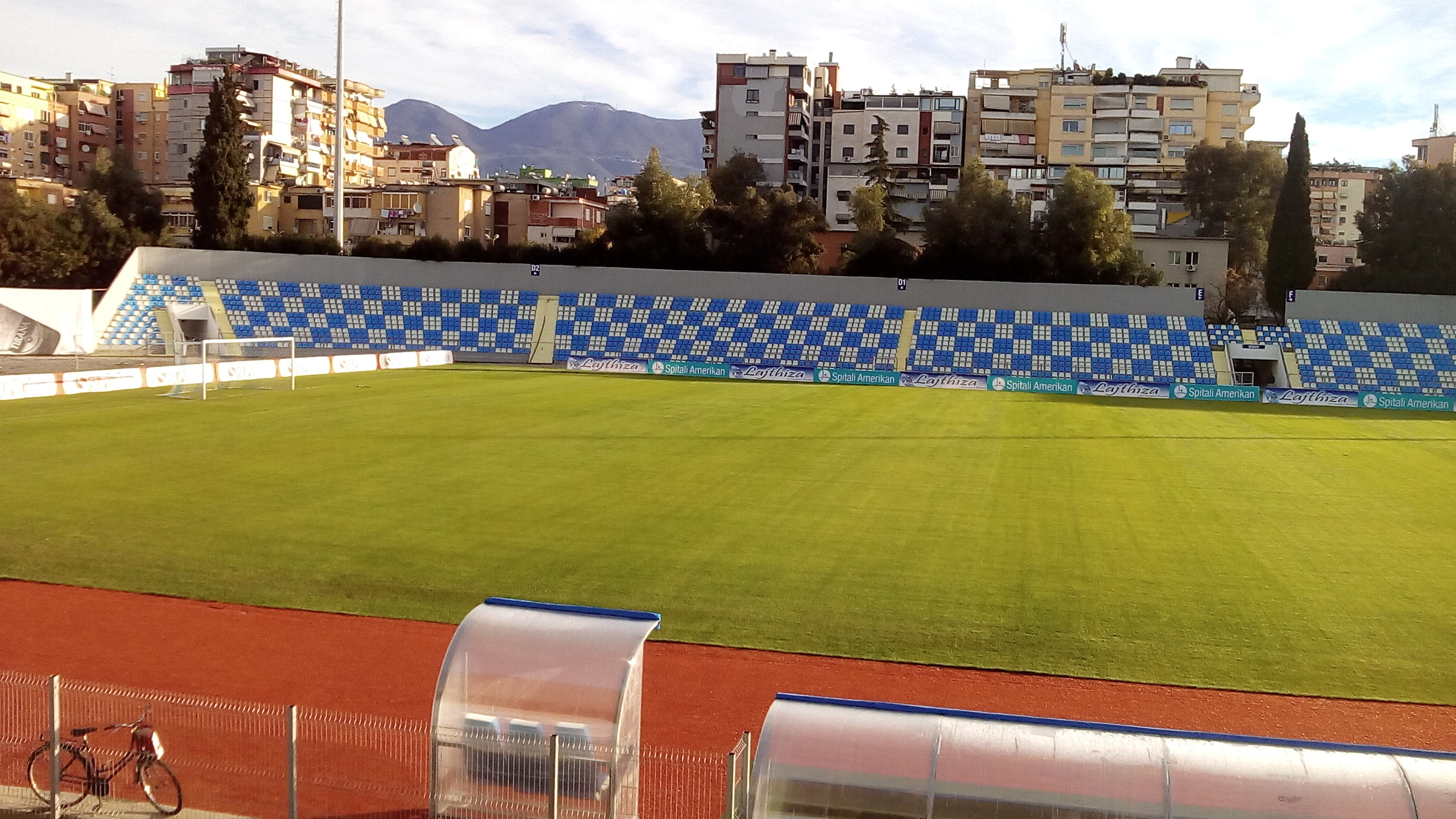
- Selman Stërmasi Stadium was renovated between 2014 and 2015.
- Interactive map of Selman Stërmasi Stadium
- Former names: "Dinamo" Stadium (1956–1991)
- Location: Tirana, Albania
- Owner: Tirana
- Operator: Tirana
- Capacity: 7,308
- Surface: Natural grass
- Scoreboard: Yes
- Record attendance: 36,000 Tirana–Partizani (30 September 1961)

Construction
- Groundbreaking: 1955
- Opened: 1956
- Renovated: 1995; 2005; 2015

Tenants
- Dinamo City; Tirana

The Selman Stërmasi Stadium (Albanian: Stadiumi Selman Stërmasi) is a multi-purpose stadium in Tirana, Albania. It is currently used mostly for football matches and best known as the home ground of Tirana. The stadium holds 7,308 people (all seated). It is named after Selman Stërmasi, one of KF Tirana's best players of all time. The stadium was also used by Dinamo City and Partizani until 2010, however, due to failure to cooperate on the admittance fees, these teams were not allowed to use the stadium any further.

== History ==
The stadium is located approximately 400 m from the west side of the Lana stream and of former exhibition site "Shqiperia Sot" (now Top-Channel Television headquarters). It was built in 1956 and named Dinamo Stadium until 1991 when it was given its new name. The Football Association of Albania and KF Tirana decided posthumously name the stadium after the eminent KF Tirana player, coach and president, Selman Stërmasi. The stadium has recently ended a long phase of construction, which involved development of the main pitch, central seated area, facilities around the ground and general lineaments. There are still improvements expected to be made, such as side seated areas, an electronic clock and a KF Tirana shopping centre just under the central seated stand. The internal facilities include a press conference room. The main parking area is located at the front of the stadium which leads to the entrance.

== Renovation ==
In December 2014, work started yet again on Selman Stërmasi Stadium and the Skënder Halili Complex in order to fully renovate these grounds to be used by KF Tirana. The stadium's exterior, interior and playing surface was renovated and 8,150 seats were replaced as part of the renovations taking place.

== Gallery ==
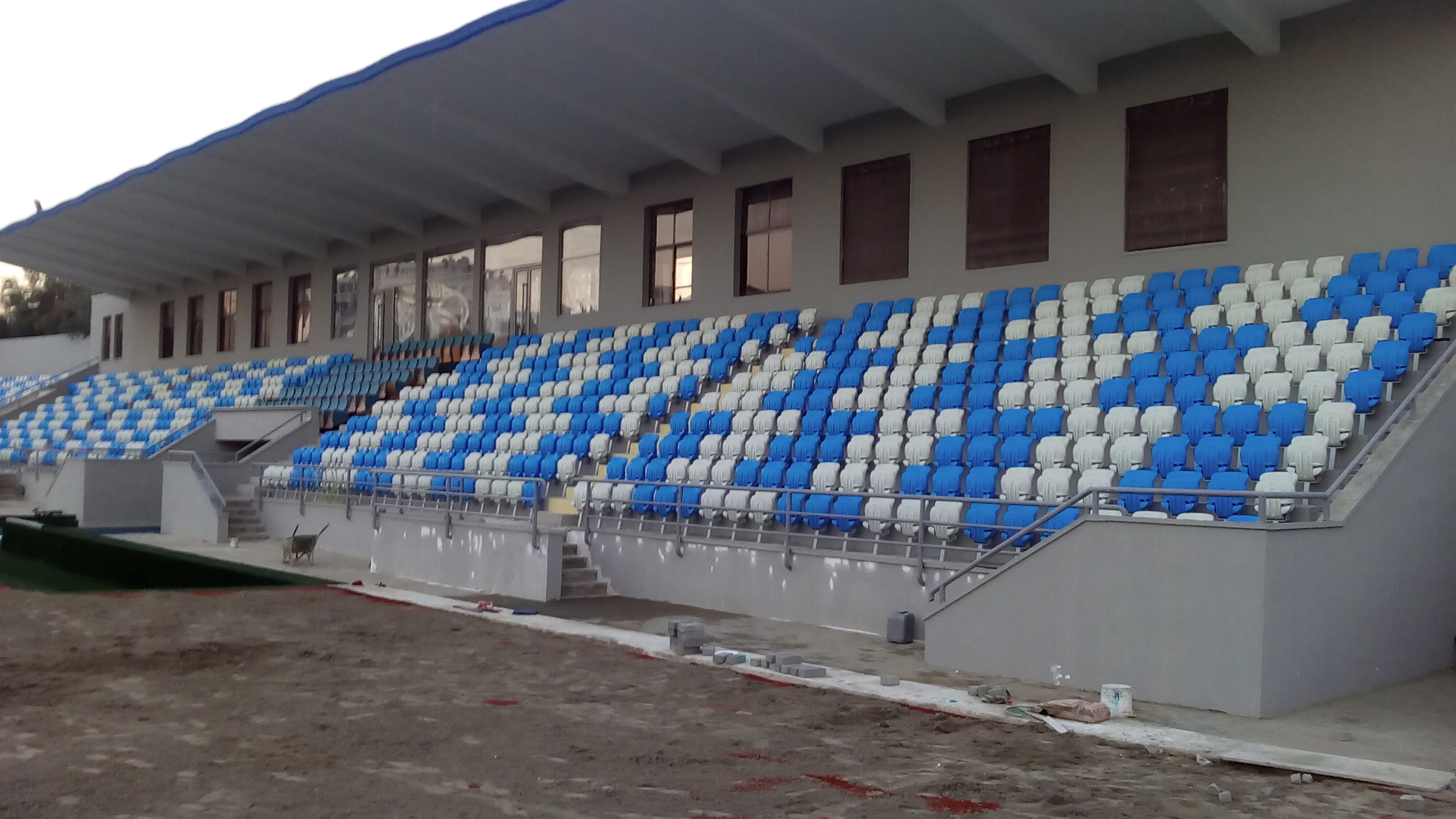

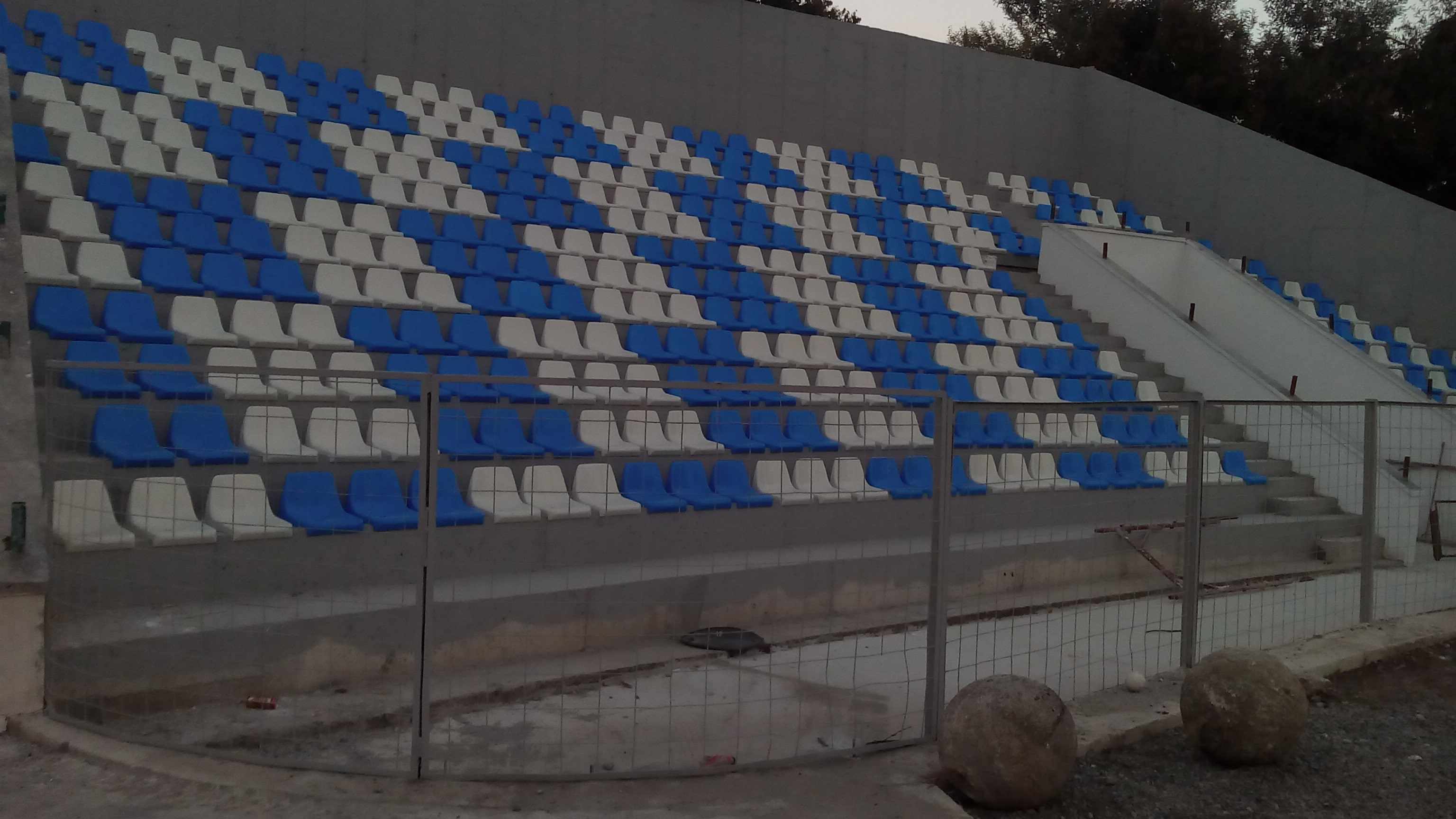

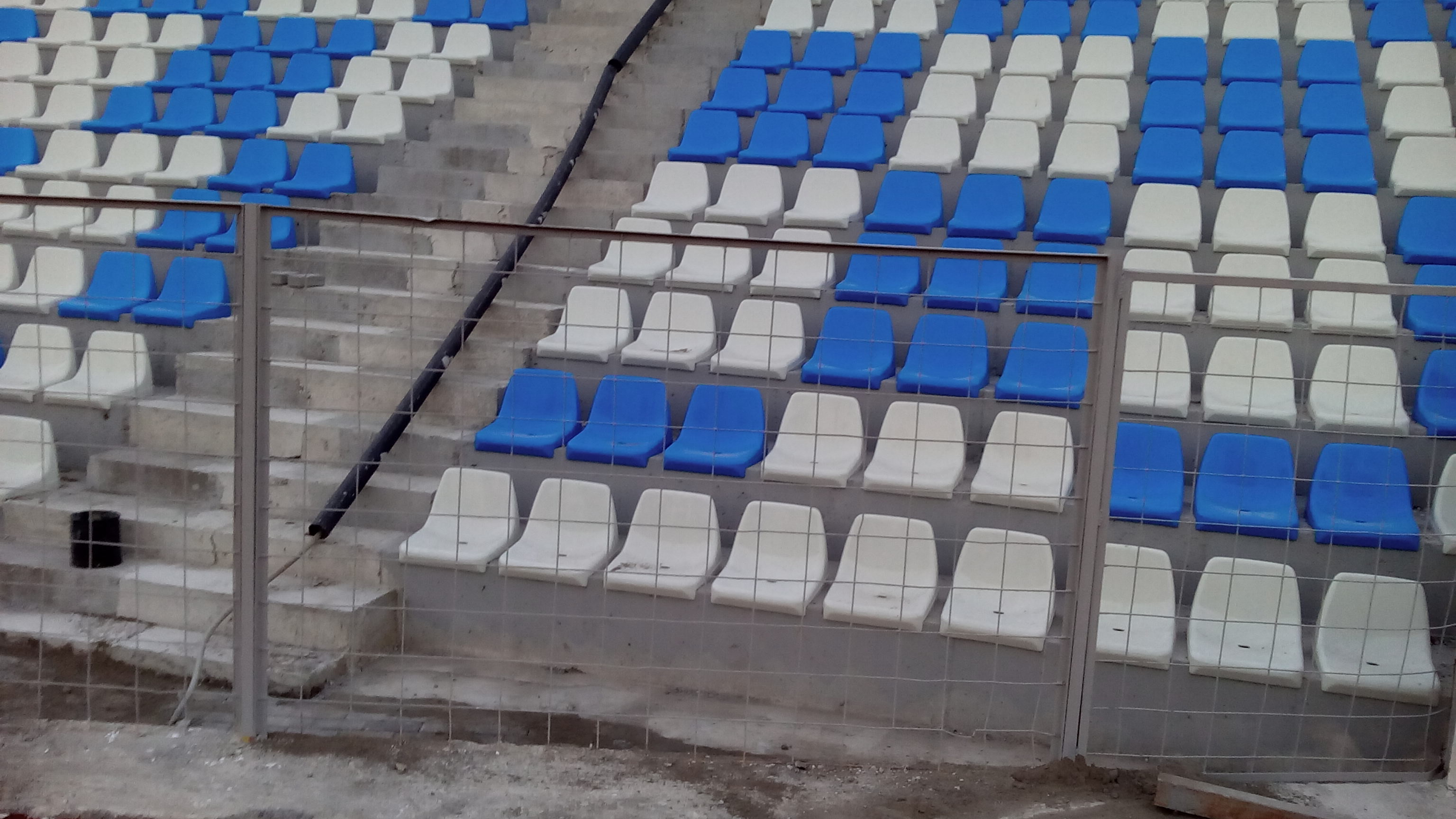

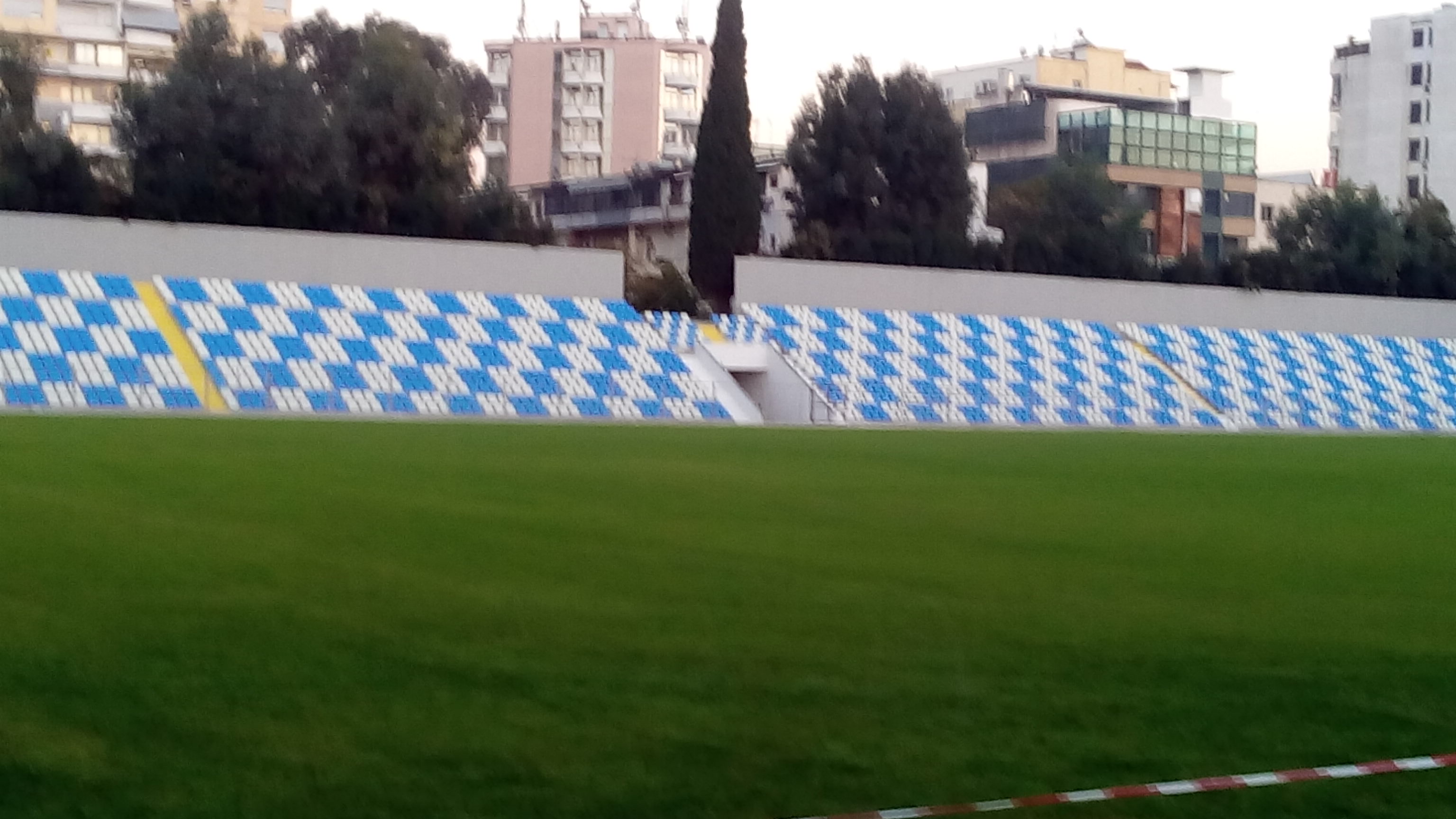

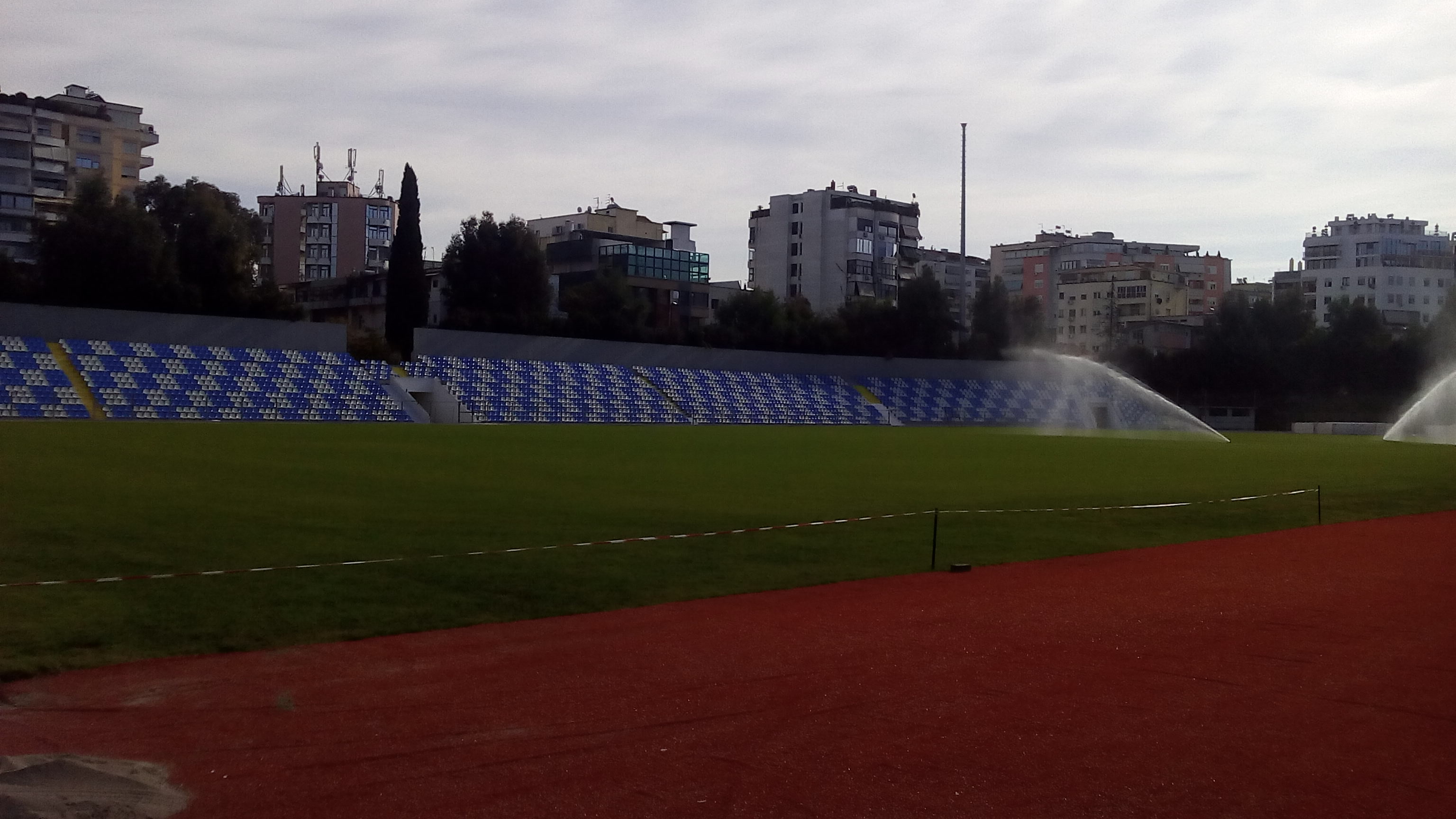
