= Dinamo Tirana–KF Tirana rivalry =

Football rivalry in Albania

KF Tirana vs Dinamo
- Location: Tirana, Albania
- Teams: KF Tirana, Dinamo City
- First meeting: 1950
- Latest meeting: Dinamo 1–1 Tirana; Abissnet Superiore (Round 32: 18 April 2026)
- Next meeting: n/a
- Stadiums: Selman Stërmasi Stadium; Arena Kombëtare

Statistics
- Total meetings: 187 matches
- Most wins: KF Tirana (74) +5 wins
- Largest victory: Dinamo City 6–0 KF Tirana; KF Tirana 6–0 Dinamo City

The Dinamo City–KF Tirana rivalry is a rivalry between football clubs KF Tirana and Dinamo City, the two most successful clubs from the city of Tirana in Albania. It is one of the longest currently running top-flight derby in Albania. KF Tirana dominates either historically, or during last 30 seasons against the Dinamo.

However, Dinamo have won more ties in their Cup confrontation.

== Win–loss totals ==
=== Kategoria Superiore ===
Competition	Played	Tirana	Draw	Dinamo	Tirana Goals	Dinamo Goals
Superior League	155	65	38	52	231	204

=== Albanian Cup ===
Competition	Played	Tirana	Draw	Dinamo	Tirana Goals	Dinamo Goals	Tirana ties won	Dinamo ties won
Albanian Cup	33	9	6	18	32	48	7	10

Competition	Played	Tirana	Draw	Dinamo	Tirana Goals	Dinamo Goals	Goals Difference
League & Cup	188	74	44	70	263	252	11

== All matches Tirana vs Dinamo ==
Tirana win Draw Dinamo win

=== Kategoria Superiore ===
Season	1st match	2nd match	3rd match	4th match	Matches
1950	0–1	–	–	–	1
1951	1–2	0–6	–	–	2
1952	0–1	1–0	–	–	2
1953	0–3	4–2	–	–	2
1954	0–2	3–1	–	–	2
1955	1–2	0–2	–	–	2
1956	0–2	0–0	–	–	2
1957	1–3	1–1	–	–	2
1958	4–0	1–0	–	–	2
1959	1–1	2–0	–	–	2
1960	0–1	0–2	–	–	2
1961	0–2	0–1	–	–	2
1962–63	1–1	1–3	–	–	2
1963–64	1–2	0–1	–	–	2
1964–65	2–1	2–1	–	–	2
1965–66	2–1	2–1	–	–	2
1966–67	3–1	2–2	–	–	2
1968	2–1	2–1	–	–	2
1969–70	3–2	3–0	–	–	2
1970–71	0–1	0–1	–	–	2
1971–72	2–1	2–2	–	–	2
1972–73	0–3	1–3	–	–	2
1973–74	3–0	0–2	–	–	2
1974–75	1–1	2–2	–	–	2
1975–76	2–2	2–1	–	–	2
1976–77	2–1	0–1	1–2	1–1	4
1977–78	1–0	0–0	–	–	2
1978–79	1–1	2–2	–	–	2
1979–80	4–5	0–1	–	–	2

Season	Date	Home	Away	Result	Goals (Home)	Goals (Away)
1980–81	29 October 1980	Tirana	Dinamo	3–2		
1980–81	1 March 1981	Dinamo	Tirana	1–0		
1981–82	13 December 1981	Tirana	Dinamo	0–1		
1981–82	9 May 1982	Dinamo	Tirana	2–2		
1982–83	29 August 1982	Dinamo	Tirana	3–4		
1982–83	20 February 1983	Tirana	Dinamo	1–1		
1983–84	23 October 1983	Tirana	Dinamo	0–0		
1983–84	15 April 1984	Dinamo	Tirana	0–1		
1984–85	15 November 1984	Tirana	Dinamo	1–0		
1984–85	28 April 1985	Dinamo	Tirana	3–2		
1985–86	24 November 1985	Tirana	Dinamo	3–5		
1985–86	27 April 1986	Dinamo	Tirana	0–0		
1986–87	7 December 1986	Dinamo	Tirana	3–4		
1986–87	17 May 1987	Tirana	Dinamo	3–2		
1987–88	6 December 1987	Dinamo	Tirana	0–0		
1987–88	27 March 1988	Tirana	Dinamo	1–1		
1988–89	20 November 1988	Tirana	Dinamo	3–0		
1988–89	18 March 1989	Dinamo	Tirana	1–2		
1988–89	26 March 1989	Tirana	Dinamo	4–3		
1988–89	7 May 1989	Dinamo	Tirana	1–0		
1989–90	9 November 1989	Dinamo	Tirana	0–1		
1989–90	25 February 1990	Tirana	Dinamo	0–1		
1989–90	1 April 1990	Dinamo	Tirana	2–0		
1990–91	7 November 1990	Tirana	Dinamo	1–1		
1990–91	10 February 1991	Dinamo	Tirana	1–1		
1990–91	4 April 1991	Dinamo	Tirana	1–5		
1991–92	15 December 1991	Tirana	Dinamo	1–1		
1991–92	10 May 1992	Dinamo	Tirana	1–0		
1992–93	13 November 1992	Tirana	Dinamo	0–1		
1992–93	25 April 1993	Dinamo	Tirana	0–0		
1993–94	15 December 1993	Dinamo	Tirana	0–3		
1993–94	30 April 1994	Tirana	Dinamo	1–0		
1994–95	10 December 1994	Tirana	Dinamo	3–3		
1994–95	20 May 1995	Dinamo	Tirana	2–1		
1995–96	9 December 1995	Dinamo	Tirana	0–1		
1995–96	27 April 1996	Tirana	Dinamo	3–1		
1996–97	14 September 1996	Dinamo	Tirana	0–3		
1997–98	21 September 1997	Dinamo	Tirana	1–4		
1997–98	14 February 1998	Tirana	Dinamo	2–0		
1998–99	7 November 1998	Dinamo	Tirana	0–3		
1998–99	2 April 1999	Tirana	Dinamo	1–0		
1999–2000	18 December 1999	Dinamo	Tirana	1–2	F. Xhafa	Alimehmeti, Dabulla
1999–2000	24 May 2000	Tirana	Dinamo	4–0	Rizvanolli, Vito (3)	
2000–01	4 November 2000	Dinamo	Tirana	1–3	Pisha	Fortuzi (3)
2000–01	7 April 2001	Tirana	Dinamo	1–1	Dede	Pisha
2001–02	1 December 2001	Dinamo	Tirana	3–1	Dhembi, F. Xhafa, Qorri	Merkoçi
2001–02	11 May 2002	Tirana	Dinamo	2–2	Bulku, Halili	D. Xhafa, F. Xhafa
2002–03	5 October 2002	Tirana	Dinamo	3–1	Veenhof, Halili, D. Muka	Asllani
2002–03	16 March 2003	Dinamo	Tirana	2–3	O. Muka, Pinari	Jupi, D. Muka (2)
2003–04	17 October 2003	Dinamo	Tirana	0–0		
2003–04	20 December 2003	Tirana	Dinamo	5–1	Fortuzi, D. Muka, Dabulla, F. Xhafa (2)	Bakalli
2003–04	19 March 2004	Dinamo	Tirana	3–0	Qorri (2), Keita	
2003–04	15 May 2004	Tirana	Dinamo	1–1	F. Xhafa	Leandro
2004–05	30 October 2004	Tirana	Dinamo	3–1	F. Xhafa, Sene, Agolli	Pinari
2004–05	22 December 2004	Dinamo	Tirana	2–1	Dhëmbi (2)	Bulku
2004–05	12 March 2005	Tirana	Dinamo	0–2		Goudjabi
2004–05	20 May 2005	Dinamo	Tirana	0–1		D. Muka
2005–06	17 September 2005	Dinamo	Tirana	3–3	Goudjabi, Ahmataj, Poçi	Salihi (2), Bulku
2005–06	26 November 2005	Tirana	Dinamo	1–1	Salihi	Deliallisi
2005–06	15 February 2006	Dinamo	Tirana	1–1	Pema	Salihi
2005–06	8 April 2006	Tirana	Dinamo	3–0	Duro, Bakalli, D. Muka	
2006–07	23 September 2006	Tirana	Dinamo	2–1	Salihi, Pema	Ahmataj
2006–07	9 December 2006	Dinamo	Tirana	1–2	Qorri	Sinani (2)
2006–07	28 April 2007	Tirana	Dinamo	2–1	Pema, Sinani	Pejić
2007–08	3 November 2007	Dinamo	Tirana	0–2		J. Sefa, Dede
2007–08	16 February 2008	Tirana	Dinamo	0–0		
2007–08	3 May 2008	Tirana	Dinamo	1–2	F. Xhafa	Pejić, Kuli
2008–09	19 October 2008	Tirana	Dinamo	2–1	Memelli, Muzaka	Allmuça
2008–09	31 January 2009	Dinamo	Tirana	2–4	F. Sefa, Plaku	Memelli (2), Agolli, Xhafaj
2008–09	16 May 2009	Dinamo	Tirana	2–3	Jusufi, Bakaj	Agolli, Lilaj, Sorra
2009–10	18 October 2009	Dinamo	Tirana	2–1	Bakaj, F. Sefa	Abilaliaj
2009–10	25 January 2010	Tirana	Dinamo	1–2	Muzaka	Malacarne, Bakaj
2009–10	14 May 2010	Tirana	Dinamo	3–2	Muka, Plaku, Muzaka	Malota, Bakaj
2010–11	18 October 2010	Tirana	Dinamo	1–1	Osmani	Martinena
2010–11	31 January 2011	Dinamo	Tirana	1–2	Bakaj	Morina, Lila
2010–11	1 April 2011	Dinamo	Tirana	0–0		
2011–12	26 November 2011	Tirana	Dinamo	1–0	G. Lika	
2011–12	25 April 2012	Dinamo	Tirana	3–2	Djarmati, Kuli (2)	Balaj, Kalari
2021–22	5 November 2021	Tirana	Dinamo	4–0	Seferi, Xhixha (2), Hoti	
2021–22	24 January 2022	Dinamo	Tirana	0–1		Xhixha
2021–22	19 March 2022	Tirana	Dinamo	1–0	Devid	
2021–22	21 May 2022	Dinamo	Tirana	2–1	Haxhiu, Samake	Seferi
2023–24	27 August 2023	Dinamo	Tirana	2–3	Kaçorri, Denisson	Hila, Latifi, Hasani
2023–24	28 October 2023	Tirana	Dinamo	1–1	Hasani	Denisson
2023–24	12 January 2024	Dinamo	Tirana	2–3	Zabërgja, Andoni	Hoxhallari, Deliu, Latifi
2023–24	17 March 2024	Tirana	Dinamo	3–2	Nikqi, Latifi, Jonuzi	Qefalija (2)
2024–25	19 October 2024	Tirana	Dinamo	0–0		
2024–25	14 December 2024	Dinamo	Tirana	2–1	Qefalija, Nani	Ndreca
2024–25	2 March 2025	Tirana	Dinamo	1–4	Jarmuni	Meta og, Bregu, Lorran, Mandela
2024–25	27 April 2025	Dinamo	Tirana	0–2		Rafa, Jarmuni
2025–26	27 September 2025	Tirana	Dinamo	1–2	Patsatsia	Goudiaby, Vila
2025–26	4 December 2025	Dinamo	Tirana	6–2	Guindo, Qardaku (2),Bregu(2) ,Vila	Rafa, Tare
2025–26	7 February 2026	Tirana	Dinamo	1–1	Falaje	Koma
2025–26	18 April 2026	Dinamo	Tirana	1–1	Malomo	Myslovič
2026–27	29 October 2026	Tirana	Dinamo	1–1	Xhixha	Hoxhallari

=== 30 recent seasons of Tirana vs Dinamo ===
Competition	Played	Tirana	Draw	Dinamo	Tirana Goals	Dinamo Goals	Goal Difference
Kategoria Superiore	71	36	18	17	115	81	+39

== League placements ==
The league placement table shows the results of KF Tirana and Dinamo City, when they played in Kategoria Superiore.

P.	50	51	52	53	54	55	56	57	58	59	60	61	63	64	65	66	67	68	70	71	72	73	74	75	76	77	78	79	80	81	82	83	84	85	86	87	88	89	90	91	92	93	94
1	1	1	1	1		1	1				1				1	1	1	1	1			1		1	1	1			1		1			1	1		1	1	1				
2					2			2				2	2	2			2			2	2				2			2	2	2			2	2									2
3		3		3	3	3	3		3	3	3	3				3		3												3	3	3			3			3					
4								4	4	4			4						4		4		4	4			4									4			4	4			
5			5																							5		5													5		
6														6													6									6				6		6	6
7																				7																							
8																																8									8		
9	9																																										
10																																											
11															11							11											11				11					11	
12																																											
13																							14																				
14																																											
15																																											
16																																											

P.	95	96	97	98	99	00	01	02	03	04	05	06	07	08	09	10	11	12	13	14	15	16	17	19	20	21	22	23	24	25
1	1	1	1		1	1		1	1	1	1		1	1	1	1									1		1			
2				2			2	2		2		2																2		
3							3				3	3			3	3		3												
4																					4									4
5		5											5				5		5			5				5			5	
6					6							6		6						6										
7																								7					7	
8	8																													8
9																							9							
10						10											10													
11																														
12				12																										
13																														
14																		14												
15																														
16			16																											

• Total: KF Tirana 40 times higher, Dinamo City 29 times higher.

== See also ==
- KF Tirana-KF Vllaznia rivalry
- Tirana derbies
- KF Tirana–Partizani Tirana rivalry
