= 1999–2000 Albanian National Championship =

Albanian National Championship
- Season: 1999–2000
- Dates: 18 September 1999 – 7 June 2000
- Champions: Tirana; 19th Albanian title
- Relegated: Partizani; Elbasani
- Champions League: Tirana
- UEFA Cup: Tomori; Teuta
- Intertoto Cup: Vllaznia
- Matches: 182
- Goals: 401 (2.2 per match)
- Top goalscorer: Klodian Arbëri (18 goals)

The 1999–2000 Albanian National Championship was the 61st season of the Albanian National Championship, the top professional league for association football clubs, since its establishment in 1930. The season began on 18 September 1999 and concluded on 7 June 2000. Tirana began the season as defending champions 1998–99 season and Shqiponja was the only team promoted from the Kategoria e Dytë as the league was reduced from 16 teams to 14.

Tirana retained their title, as they won it for the 19th time and their 5th time in the previous 6 seasons. Partizani were the first team to be relegated, followed by relegation/promotion playoff losers Elbasani down to the Kategoria e Dytë.

== Teams ==
=== Promotion and relegation ===
A total of 14 teams competed in the 1999–2000 season, 2 less than the previous where 16 teams competed. Of these 14 teams, 13 were from the 1998–99 season with Shqiponja being the only promoted side from the Kategoria e Dytë. 3 sides from the 1998–99 season were relegated, and they were Burreli, Laçi and Besa.

=== Stadia and last season ===
Locations of the 1999–2000 Albanian National Championship teams

Team	Location	Stadium	Capacity	Last season
Apolonia	Fier	Loni Papuçiu Stadium	10,000	13th
Bylis	Ballsh	Adush Muça Stadium	6,000	3rd
Dinamo	Tirana	Qemal Stafa Stadium (Note: Dinamo Tirana, Partizani and Tirana all shared the Qemal Stafa Stadium as well as the Selman Stërmasi Stadium.)	19,700	6th
Elbasani	Elbasan	Ruzhdi Bizhuta Stadium	15,000	9th
Flamurtari	Vlorë	Flamurtari Stadium	15,000	11th
Lushnja	Lushnjë	Abdurrahman Roza Haxhiu Stadium	12,000	5th
Partizani	Tirana	Qemal Stafa Stadium	19,700	10th
Skënderbeu	Korçë	Skënderbeu Stadium	12,000	12th
Shkumbini	Peqin	Shkumbini Stadium	6,000	7th
Shqiponja	Gjirokastër	Gjirokastër Stadium	9,000	Kategoria e Dytë
Teuta	Durrës	Niko Dovana Stadium	12,040	8th
Tirana	Tirana	Qemal Stafa Stadium	19,700	Champions
Tomori	Berat	Tomori Stadium	14,750	4th
Vllaznia	Shkodër	Loro Boriçi Stadium	15,000	2nd

== Regular season ==
=== League table ===
Pos	Team	Pld	W	D	L	GF	GA	GD	Pts	Qualification or relegation
1	Tirana (C)	26	16	4	6	40	14	+26	52	Qualification for the Champions League first qualifying round
2	Tomori	26	15	7	4	35	22	+13	52	Qualification for the UEFA Cup qualifying round (Note: Teuta won the 1999–2000 Albanian Cup and qualified for the 2000–01 UEFA Cup qualifying round, therefore forfeiting their Intertoto Cup first round place that they had won.)
3	Teuta	26	15	4	7	36	16	+20	49	Qualification for the UEFA Cup qualifying round
4	Vllaznia	26	11	4	11	29	28	+1	37	Qualification for the Intertoto Cup first round (Note: Vllaznia and Bylis finished the season level on points so the Albanian Football Association decided to organise a playoff game to determine which side will take the Intertoto Cup first round place that Teuta had forfeited.)
5	Bylis	26	10	7	9	28	29	−1	37	
6	Lushnja	26	10	5	11	34	31	+3	35	
7	Shkumbini	26	10	5	11	31	31	0	35	
8	Skënderbeu	26	10	4	12	33	33	0	34	
9	Shqiponja	26	8	9	9	21	21	0	33	
10	Dinamo Tirana	26	8	7	11	27	31	−4	31	
11	Apolonia	26	9	4	13	22	41	−19	31	
12	Flamurtari	26	9	3	14	25	35	−10	30	
13	Elbasani (R)	26	8	5	13	19	32	−13	29	Qualification for the relegation play-offs
14	Partizani (R)	26	6	6	14	21	37	−16	24	Relegation to the 2000–01 Kategoria e Dytë

Source: Soccerway, RSSSF.org
Rules for classification: 1) Points
(C) Champions; (R) Relegated

=== Results ===
Home \ Away	APO	BYL	DIN	ELB	FLA	LUS	PAR	SKË	SKU	SHQ	TEU	TIR	TOM	VLL
Apolonia		1–1	0–2	0–1	2–0	2–0	2–0	3–1	1–1	2–1	0–1	2–1	0–0	2–0
Bylis	1–0		2–1	2–0	6–3	1–0	1–0	2–1	1–0	1–1	0–2 (Note: Match awarded.)	0–0	1–0	2–1
Dinamo	0–1	0–0		2–1	1–0	2–0	2–1	1–0	3–0	2–1	1–2	1–2	3–3	0–2
Elbasani	0–2	3–1	2–1		0–0	2–1	1–1	0–0	1–0	0–0	2–1	1–0	0–1	1–2
Flamurtari	3–1	1–0	0–0	3–0		0–3	1–2	3–1	2–1	1–0	1–0	1–0	0–1	3–1
Lushnja	2–0	1–1	3–1	4–0	2–0		1–0	3–2	0–1	1–0	3–2	2–0	1–1	1–1
Partizani	3–1	0–0	1–0	2–1	1–0	1–1		2–3	1–1	1–2	2–0	0–0	0–1	2–2
Skënderbeu	7–0	2–1	1–1	2–0	2–1	2–1	1–0		3–1	1–0	0–0	0–1	2–2	1–0
Shkumbini	2–0	1–1	1–1	1–0	1–0	1–1	3–0	2–0		2–0	3–2	0–1	3–0	2–1
Shqiponja	0–0	2–0	1–0	0–0	0–0	1–0	3–0	2–0	2–1		0–0	1–1	0–0	3–2
Teuta	4–0	2–0	1–1	1–0	3–1	2–0	4–0	2–0	2–0	1–0		1–0	2–0	1–0
Tirana	7–0	2–0	4–0	2–1	2–0	2–1	3–0	1–0	3–1	4–1	1–0		0–0	1–0
Tomori	2–0	4–3	2–1	2–0	2–1	3–2	2–1	2–0	3–1	1–0	0–0	1–0		2–0
Vllaznia	1–0	1–0	0–0	1–2	3–1	3–0	1–0	2–1	2–1	0–0	2–0	0–2	1–0	

Source: RSSSF.org
Legend: Blue = home team win; Yellow = draw; Red = away team win.

== Playoffs ==
=== Championship playoff ===
Tirana and Tomori finished the season level on points so the Albanian Football Association decided to organise a championship playoff game to determine the winner of the 1999–2000 Albanian National Championship. The game was played at Ruzhdi Bizhuta Stadium in Elbasan and Tirana won on penalties following a 1–1 draw to retain their title. Had the league been decided on goal difference Tirana would have won it, but if it had been decided on their head-to-head record Tomori would have won it.

28 May 2000

Tirana	1–1 (a.e.t.)	Tomori
Nevil Dede 88'		Erjon Rizvanolli 57'
Penalties
Alimehmeti (penalty scored); Kenesei (penalty scored); Memishi (penalty scored); Driza (penalty scored); Dede (penalty scored)	5 – 4	(penalty missed) Hasa; (penalty scored) Lako; (penalty scored) Gega; (penalty scored) Arbëri; (penalty scored) Muzhaj

Ruzhdi Bizhuta Stadium, Elbasan
Attendance: 12,000
Referee: Bujar Pregja

=== Intertoto Cup playoff ===
Vllaznia and Bylis finished the season level on points so the Albanian Football Association decided to organise a playoff game to determine which side will take the Intertoto Cup place. Although Teuta finished 3rd and would have taken the Intertoto Cup place had they not won the 1999–2000 Albanian Cup, meaning they forfeited their Intertoto Cup place in order to take up their UEFA Cup place for winning the Albanian Cup. Vllaznia won the game 4–3 at the Selman Stërmasi Stadium in Tirana.

Vllaznia	4–3	Bylis
Sula 27' (o.g.); Beqiri 50'; Bylykbashi 60'; Osja 82'		Jakupi 5'; Bilali 73'; Shehu 90'

Selman Stërmasi Stadium, Tirana

=== Relegation/promotion playoff ===
Elbasani finished in penultimate place in the league, and although they were not automatically relegated like Partizani, they were placed in a relegation/promotion playoff against the Kategoria e Dytë playoff runners-up Besa. The game took place on 7 June 2000 in Tirana and Besa won 2–1, thanks to goals from Armand Daiu and Demneri, to earn promotion to the 2000–01 National Championship, with Elbasani being relegated down to the Kategoria e Dytë.

7 June 2000

Besa	2–1	Elbasani
Armand Daiu 25' (pen.); Demneri 50'		Ibërshimi 41'

Tirana

== Season statistics ==
=== Top scorers ===
Rank	Player	Club	Goals
1	(Albania) Klodian Arbëri	Tomori	18
2	(Albania) Vladimir Gjoni	Shkumbini	14
3	(Albania) Daniel Xhafa	Flamurtari/Bylis	12
3	(Albania) Rigels Qose	Skënderbeu	12
5	(Albania) Anesti Vito	Flamurtari/Tirana	11
6	(Albania) Edi Martini	Vllaznia	8
6	(Albania) Alban Rexha	Partizani	8
6	(Albania) Artan Bano	Lushnja	8
6	(Albania) Fjodor Xhafa	Dinamo Tirana	8
6	(Albania) Justin Bespalla	Teuta	8
