= 1998–99 Albanian National Championship =

Albanian National Championship
- Season: 1998–99
- Dates: 29 August 1998 – 15 May 1999
- Champions: Tirana; 18th Albanian title
- Relegated: Burreli; Laçi; Besa
- Champions League: Tirana
- UEFA Cup: Vllaznia; Bylis
- Intertoto Cup: Teuta
- Matches: 240
- Goals: 618 (2.58 per match)
- Top goalscorer: Artan Bano (22 goals)
- Biggest home win: Vllaznia 8–0 Flamurtari (5 February 1999)
- Biggest away win: Teuta 0–5 Tirana (24 November 1998)
- Highest scoring: Burreli 4–4 Dinamo (30 October 1998); Vllaznia 8–0 Flamurtari (5 February 1999); Laçi 5–3 Skënderbeu (7 May 1999)

The 1998–99 Albanian National Championship was the 60th season of the Albanian National Championship, the top professional league for association football clubs, since its establishment in 1930. The season began on 29 August 1998 and concluded on 15 May 1999. Vllaznia began the season as defending champions of the 1997–98 season and Burreli was the only team promoted from the Kategoria e Dytë as the league was reduced from 18 teams to 16.

Tirana won their 18th Albanian title, having finished as runners-up during the previous season. The newly promoted club Burreli were the first team to be relegated, and they were followed by Laçi and Besa down to the Kategoria e Dytë.

== Teams ==
=== Promotion and relegation ===
A total of 16 teams competed in the 1998–99 season, 2 less than the previous where 18 teams competed. Of these 16 teams, 15 of them were from the 1997–98 season with Burreli being the only promoted side from the Kategoria e Dytë. 3 sides from the 1997–98 season were relegated, and they were Shqiponja, Sopoti and Albpetrol.

=== Stadia and last season ===
Locations of the 1998–99 Albanian National Championship teams

Team	Location	Stadium	Capacity	Last season
Apolonia	Fier	Loni Papuçiu Stadium	10,000	7th
Besa	Kavajë	Besa Stadium	8,000	14th
Burreli	Burrel	Liri Ballabani Stadium	2,500	Kategoria e Dytë
Bylis	Ballsh	Adush Muça Stadium	6,000	13th
Dinamo Tirana	Tirana	Qemal Stafa Stadium (Note: Dinamo Tirana, Partizani and Tirana all shared the Qemal Stafa Stadium as well as the Selman Stërmasi Stadium.)	19,700	12th
Elbasani	Elbasan	Ruzhdi Bizhuta Stadium	15,000	6th
Flamurtari	Vlorë	Flamurtari Stadium	15,000	15th
Laçi	Laç	Laçi Stadium	5,000	8th
Lushnja	Lushnjë	Abdurrahman Roza Haxhiu Stadium	12,000	9th
Partizani	Tirana	Qemal Stafa Stadium	19,700	3rd
Skënderbeu	Korçë	Skënderbeu Stadium	12,000	11th
Shkumbini	Peqin	Shkumbini Stadium	6,000	4th
Teuta	Durrës	Niko Dovana Stadium	12,040	5th
Tirana	Tirana	Qemal Stafa Stadium	19,700	2nd
Tomori	Berat	Tomori Stadium	14,750	10th
Vllaznia	Shkodër	Loro Boriçi Stadium	15,000	Champions

== League table ==
Pos	Team	Pld	W	D	L	GF	GA	GD	Pts	Qualification or relegation
1	Tirana (C)	30	18	7	5	48	20	+28	61	Qualification for the Champions League first qualifying round
2	Vllaznia	30	18	6	6	57	18	+39	60	Qualification for the UEFA Cup qualifying round (Note: Bylis qualified for the UEFA Cup qualifying round due to Tirana winning the league as well as the 1998–99 Albanian Cup, meaning their place in the UEFA Cup was awarded to the cup runners-up Vllaznia, who also finished as runners-up in the league, meaning that their place in the UEFA Cup through the league route was awarded to Bylis.)
3	Bylis	30	18	5	7	51	19	+32	59	Qualification for the UEFA Cup qualifying round
4	Tomori	30	13	7	10	31	25	+6	46	
5	Lushnja	30	14	2	14	52	40	+12	44	
6	Dinamo Tirana	30	11	7	12	37	37	0	40	
7	Shkumbini	30	12	4	14	30	38	−8	40	
8	Teuta	30	12	4	14	28	48	−20	40	Qualification for the Intertoto Cup first round
9	Elbasani	30	11	6	13	30	30	0	39	
10	Partizani	30	10	9	11	37	46	−9	39	
11	Flamurtari	30	11	5	14	40	47	−7	38	
12	Skënderbeu	30	12	2	16	44	53	−9	38	
13	Apolonia	30	10	7	13	32	42	−10	37	
14	Besa (R)	30	10	6	14	25	40	−15	36	Relegation to the 1999–2000 Kategoria e Dytë
15	Laçi (R)	30	9	6	15	36	55	−19	33	Relegation to the 1999–2000 Kategoria e Dytë
16	Burreli (R)	30	8	3	19	40	60	−20	27	Relegation to the 1999–2000 Kategoria e Dytë

Source: Soccerway, RSSSF.org
Rules for classification: 1) Points; 2) Head-to-head points; 3) Head-to-head goal difference; 4) Head-to-head goals scored; 5) Goal difference; 6) Goals scored; 7) Draw.
(C) Champions; (R) Relegated

== Results ==
Home \ Away	APO	BES	BUR	BYL	DIN	ELB	FLA	LAÇ	LUS	PAR	SKË	SKU	TEU	TIR	TOM	VLL
Apolonia		1–0	2–0 (Note: Match awarded.)	1–0	2–0	2–1	1–0	2–1	1–1	1–0	4–2	1–1	2–1	0–1	0–0	0–0
Besa	1–0		4–1	0–1	1–0	0–0	2–1	2–0	1–0	2–1	2–1	1–0	0–0	1–1	1–1	0–0
Burreli	2–0	2–3		1–2	4–4	2–0	0–2	1–3	4–1	2–3	4–2	3–0	3–0	0–0	2–1	1–0
Bylis	4–1	2–1	5–1		1–0	3–0	4–0	4–1	1–0	2–0	5–0	2–0	3–0	2–1	2–0	2–2
Dinamo	3–1	1–0	0–0	2–1		2–1	3–1	3–1	2–0	2–2	1–0	1–0	1–2	0–3	0–0	0–1
Elbasani	1–0	4–1	3–1	1–0	0–0		2–1	3–0	1–0	1–2	3–0	1–0	2–0	0–0	2–1	1–1
Flamurtari	1–1	4–0	2–1	0–0	2–0	1–1		3–0	3–1	0–0	3–0	2–0	3–0	1–0	3–2	0–0
Laçi	4–1	1–0	2–1	0–0	2–1	1–0	4–2		0–2	2–3	5–3	1–1	2–0	3–3	0–0	0–1
Lushnja	3–1	4–0	3–0	0–2	1–1	2–0	3–2	3–1		3–0	5–1	3–0	2–0	6–1	1–0	1–2
Partizani	2–2	2–1	3–1	1–2	2–2	1–1	3–2	3–0	2–1		0–0	1–0	1–1	1–2	1–0	1–1
Skënderbeu	2–0	1–0	2–1	1–0	2–3	2–0	4–1	4–1	2–1	4–0		3–1	5–0	0–1	2–0	0–2
Shkumbini	2–1	0–0	1–0	1–0	1–0	1–0	3–0	5–0	2–1	2–0	1–0		4–1	1–2	0–0	1–0
Teuta	1–1	2–0	3–0	2–1	3–2	1–0	2–0	1–0	1–2	2–0	1–1	2–0		0–5	1–0	1–0
Tirana	2–0	2–0	3–0	0–0	1–0	1–0	1–0	0–0	3–0	2–2	2–0	4–1	3–0		3–0	1–0
Tomori	2–1	2–1	2–1	0–0	1–0	1–0	1–0	1–1	3–2	3–0	2–0	4–0	2–0	1–0		1–0
Vllaznia	4–2	5–0	4–1	2–0	1–3	3–1	8–0	2–0	3–0	2–0	4–0	4–1	3–0	1–0	1–0	

Source: RSSSF.org
Legend: Blue = home team win; Yellow = draw; Red = away team win.

== Season statistics ==
=== Top scorers ===
Rank	Player	Club	Goals
1	(Albania) Artan Bano	Lushnja	22
2	(Albania) Rigels Qose	Skënderbeu	19
3	(Albania) Vioresin Sinani	Vllaznia	14
4	(Albania) Bardhyl Elezi	Lushnja	12
4	(Albania) Klodian Asllani	Bylis	12
6	(Albania) Hekuran Jakupi	Bylis	10
6	(Albania) Fjodor Xhafa	Flamurtari	10
8	(Albania) Vladimir Gjoni	Burreli	10
8	(Albania) Fatjon Ymeri	Dinamo Tirana	10
8	(Albania) Daniel Xhafa	Flamurtari	10
