= 2000–01 Albanian National Championship =

Albanian National Championship
- Season: 2000–01
- Dates: 16 September 2000 – 19 May 2001
- Champions: Vllaznia; 9th Albanian title
- Relegated: Skënderbeu; Besa
- Champions League: Vllaznia
- UEFA Cup: Tirana; Teuta
- Intertoto Cup: Bylis
- Matches: 182
- Goals: 476 (2.62 per match)
- Top goalscorer: Indrit Fortuzi (31 goals)

The 2000–01 Albanian National Championship was the 62nd season of the Albanian National Championship, the top professional league for association football clubs, since its establishment in 1930.

== Teams ==
=== Stadia and last season ===
Locations of the 2000–01 Albanian National Championship teams

Team	Location	Stadium	Capacity	Last season
Apolonia	Fier	Loni Papuçiu Stadium	10,000	11th
Besa	Kavajë	Besa Stadium	8,000	Kategoria e Dytë
Besëlidhja	Lezhë	Brian Filipi Stadium	5,000	Kategoria e Dytë
Bylis	Ballsh	Adush Muça Stadium	6,000	5th
Dinamo Tirana	Tirana	Qemal Stafa Stadium (Note: Dinamo Tirana and Tirana all shared the Qemal Stafa Stadium as well as the Selman Stërmasi Stadium.)	19,700	10th
Flamurtari	Vlorë	Flamurtari Stadium	15,000	12th
Luftëtari	Gjirokastër	Gjirokastër Stadium	9,000	9th
Lushnja	Lushnjë	Abdurrahman Roza Haxhiu Stadium	12,000	6th
Skënderbeu	Korçë	Skënderbeu Stadium	12,000	8th
Shkumbini	Peqin	Shkumbini Stadium	6,000	7th
Teuta	Durrës	Niko Dovana Stadium	12,040	3rd
Tirana	Tirana	Qemal Stafa Stadium	19,700	Champions
Tomori	Berat	Tomori Stadium	14,750	2nd
Vllaznia	Shkodër	Loro Boriçi Stadium	15,000	4th

== League table ==
Pos	Team	Pld	W	D	L	GF	GA	GD	Pts	Qualification or relegation
1	Vllaznia (C)	26	17	5	4	51	22	+29	56	Qualification for the Champions League first qualifying round
2	Tirana	26	16	6	4	56	13	+43	54	Qualification for the UEFA Cup qualifying round (Note: Tirana qualified for the UEFA Cup qualifying round by winning the 2000–01 Albanian Cup, therefore forfeiting their Intertoto Cup first round place that they had won.)
3	Dinamo Tirana	26	15	7	4	43	21	+22	52	Qualification for the UEFA Cup qualifying round
4	Bylis	26	12	6	8	31	28	+3	42	Qualification for the Intertoto Cup first round
5	Shkumbini	26	12	5	9	40	36	+4	41	
6	Teuta	26	9	6	11	28	30	−2	33	
7	Besëlidhja	26	9	6	11	34	41	−7	33	
8	Luftëtari	26	9	5	12	31	33	−2	32	
9	Lushnja	26	8	8	10	33	36	−3	32	
10	Apolonia	26	8	6	12	28	42	−14	30	
11	Flamurtari	26	8	5	13	26	33	−7	29	
12	Tomori	26	8	4	14	33	48	−15	28	
13	Besa (R)	26	6	6	14	16	37	−21	24	Relegation to the 2001–02 Kategoria e Dytë
14	Skënderbeu (R)	26	5	5	16	25	55	−30	20	Relegation to the 2001–02 Kategoria e Dytë

Source: RSSSF.org
Rules for classification: 1) points; 2) points in head-to-head matches; 3) goal difference in head-to-head matches; 4) goals scored in head-to-head matches; 5) total goal difference; 6) total goals scored; 7) draw
(C) Champions; (R) Relegated

== Results ==
Home \ Away	APO	BES	BSL	BYL	DIN	FLA	LUF	LUS	SKË	SKU	TEU	TIR	TOM	VLL
Apolonia		3–1	3–1	3–1	1–2	1–0	1–0	1–1	3–0	2–1	1–0	0–5	2–2	0–2
Besa	0–0		2–0	0–0	1–3	2–1	2–1	0–3	1–0	1–0	0–1	0–0	1–0	1–1
Besëlidhja	2–0	2–0		3–0	1–1	1–0	0–0	3–2	5–1	1–3	1–0	0–0	6–3	1–1
Bylis	3–1	1–0	1–0		0–0	2–1	4–1	3–1	1–0	2–0	0–0	1–0	2–1	3–1
Dinamo	1–0	1–0	1–1	3–0		3–0	2–0	1–0	6–1	1–0	2–0	1–3	4–2	0–0
Flamurtari	2–2	2–0	1–1	1–1	0–0		1–0	1–0	4–1	4–0	2–1	0–1	2–1	0–1
Luftëtari	4–1	3–2	2–1	1–0	1–1	3–1		2–1	3–0	1–2	1–2	0–0	3–1	0–1
Lushnja	1–0	0–0	3–1	2–2	1–3	3–0	0–0		1–2	3–1	3–0	0–0	2–0	2–1
Skënderbeu	1–1	2–2	1–0	0–2	2–3	1–0	3–1	1–1		2–2	0–0	1–2	2–0	0–1
Shkumbini	3–0	2–0	3–0	1–0	2–1	1–1	1–0	1–0	3–1		2–2	0–0	3–0	2–1
Teuta	1–1	2–0	1–2	2–0	0–1	2–0	1–0	2–2	3–1	0–0		2–1	4–1	1–2
Tirana	3–0	3–0	6–0	2–0	1–1	2–0	2–0	7–1	4–0	4–1	4–0		1–0	2–1
Tomori	1–0	3–0	2–1	2–2	2–1	1–2	2–3	0–0	2–1	3–2	2–1	1–0		0–0
Vllaznia	4–1	3–0	4–0	2–0	2–0	2–0	1–1	4–0	3–1	6–4	1–0	3–2	3–1	

Source: RSSSF.org
Legend: Blue = home team win; Yellow = draw; Red = away team win.

== Season statistics ==
=== Top scorers ===
Rank	Player	Club	Goals
1	(Albania) Indrit Fortuzi	Tirana	18
2	(Albania) Vioresin Sinani	Vllaznia	15
2	(Albania) Ilir Qorri	Dinamo Tirana	15
4	(Albania) Edi Martini	Luftëtari/Vllaznia	12
5	(Albania) Edmond Gjata	Tomori	11
5	(Albania) Daniel Xhafa	Dinamo Tirana	11
7	(Albania) Artion Poçi	Apolonia	8
7	(Albania) Xhelal Farruku	Besëlidhja	8
9	(Albania) Astrit Nexha	Shkumbini	7
9	(Albania) Andi Shtrepi	Skënderbeu/Teuta	7
9	(Albania) Kliton Cafi	Besëlidhja	7
