= 1999–2000 Kategoria e Dytë =

Kategoria e Dytë
- Season: 1999–2000
- Champions: Besëlidhja
- Promoted: Besëlidhja; Besa
- Relegated: None
- Matches: 162
- Goals: 492 (3.04 per match)

The 1999–2000 Kategoria e Dytë was the 53rd season of a second-tier association football league in Albania.

== Group A ==
Pos	Team	Pld	W	D	L	GF	GA	GD	Pts	Qualification
1	Besëlidhja (C, P)	16	12	2	2	48	10	+38	38	Qualification to the Promotion playoff
2	Burreli	16	12	1	3	37	22	+15	37	Qualification to the Promotion playoff
3	Kastrioti	16	12	0	4	41	26	+15	36	
4	Ilir Viking	16	10	1	5	25	15	+10	31	
5	Shkodra	16	6	2	8	29	33	−4	20	
6	Përparimi	16	5	1	10	18	31	−13	16	
7	Korabi	16	4	1	11	15	36	−21	13	
8	Erzeni	16	3	1	12	12	31	−19	10	
9	Laçi	16	2	3	11	12	33	−21	9	

(C) Champions; (P) Promoted

== Group B ==
Pos	Team	Pld	W	D	L	GF	GA	GD	Pts	Qualification
1	Besa (P)	18	12	3	3	29	16	+13	39	Qualification to the Promotion playoff
2	Memaliaj	18	11	2	5	28	20	+8	35	Qualification to the Promotion playoff
3	Naftëtari	18	8	3	7	27	21	+6	27	
4	Pogradeci	18	8	2	8	24	13	+11	26	
5	Albpetrol	18	8	2	8	29	29	0	26	
6	Gramozi	18	8	2	8	24	24	0	26	
7	Tepelena	18	8	1	9	27	25	+2	25	
8	Sopoti	18	7	2	9	22	26	−4	23	
9	Butrinti	18	5	3	10	27	40	−13	18	
10	Devolli	18	4	2	12	18	41	−23	14	

(P) Promoted

== Championship/promotion playoff ==
=== Semi-finals ===
27 May 2000

Besëlidhja	2–1	Memaliaj
Zefi 37' (pen.); Gjergji 60'		Ibruli 82' (pen.)

Selman Stërmasi Stadium, Tirana
27 May 2000

Besa	2–1	Burreli
Demneri 63'; Doka 71'		Farruku 44'

Qemal Stafa Stadium, Tirana

=== Final ===
31 May 2000

Besëlidhja	1–1 (a.e.t.)	Besa
Grizha 75'		Demneri 18'
Penalties
Gjergji (penalty scored); Zenuni (penalty scored); Haxhia (penalty scored); Bygymi (penalty scored); Çuni (penalty scored)	4 – 2	(penalty missed) Doka; (penalty missed) Kapaj; (penalty scored) Bygymi; (penalty scored) Cara

Tirana
Referee: Bujar Pregja

Besëlidhja Lezhë was promoted to the 2000–01 National Championship, with Besa Kavajë had another chance to promotion, playing a tie against 13th-placed team of 1999–2000 National Championship, KF Elbasani.

=== Relegation/promotion playoff ===
7 June 2000

Besa	2–1	Elbasani
Daiu 25' (pen.); Demneri 50'		Ibërshimi 41'

Tirana

Besa Kavajë was promoted to the 2000–01 National Championship, with Elbasani being relegated down to the 2000–01 Kategoria e Dytë.
