= 1980–81 Kategoria e Dytë =

Kategoria e Dytë
- Season: 1980–81
- Champions: 31 Korriku
- Promoted: 31 Korriku; 24 Maji
- Relegated: Përparimi; Dajti

The 1980–81 Kategoria e Dytë was the 34th season of a second-tier association football league in Albania.

== League table ==
Pos	Team	Pld	W	D	L	GF	GA	GD	Pts	Promotion or relegation
1	31 Korriku (C, P)	26	12	8	6	28	21	+7	32	Promotion to 1981–82 National Championship
2	24 Maji (P)	26	10	10	6	22	18	+4	30	Promotion to 1981–82 National Championship
3	5 Shtatori	26	9	9	8	34	23	+11	27	
4	Tërbuni	26	10	7	9	24	22	+2	27	
5	Ylli i Kuq	26	11	5	10	30	32	−2	27	
6	Vetëtima	26	10	6	10	30	32	−2	26	
7	Butrinti	26	12	2	12	27	30	−3	26	
8	Shkëndija Tiranë	26	11	3	12	30	27	+3	25	
9	Apolonia	26	8	9	9	26	24	+2	25	
10	Shkumbini	26	10	5	11	29	28	+1	25	
11	Sopoti	26	9	7	10	27	27	0	25	
12	Kastrioti	26	6	12	8	22	26	−4	24	
13	Përparimi (R)	26	9	5	12	24	31	−7	23	Relegation to 1981–82 Kategoria e Tretë
14	Dajti (R)	26	6	10	10	12	24	−12	22	Relegation to 1981–82 Kategoria e Tretë

(C) Champions; (P) Promoted; (R) Relegated
