= Etienne Tare =

Albanian footballer (born 2003)

Personal information
- Full name: Etienne Noel Tare
- Date of birth: 13 September 2003 (age 23)
- Place of birth: Brescia, Italy
- Height: 1.94 m (6 ft 4 in)
- Position: Forward

Team information
- Current team: Tirana
- Number: 17

Youth career
- 2009–2022: Lazio

Senior career*
| Years | Team | Apps | (Gls) |
| 2022–2023 | Rapid Wien II | 1 | (0) |
| 2023–2024 | Sturm Graz II | 4 | (0) |
| 2024–2025 | Skënderbeu Korçë | 3 | (0) |
| 2025 | Dukagjini | 6 | (0) |
| 2025– | Tirana | 17 | (1) |
- * Club domestic league appearances and goals as of 8 December 2025

Etienne Noel Tare (Albanian: Etien Tare, pronounced [ɛtiɛn tarɛ]; born 13 September 2003) is a professional footballer who plays as a forward for Tirana in the Kategoria Superiore.

Born in Brescia, Italy, Tare holds German citizenship and is of Albanian origin. He began his football career in the youth system of Lazio, progressing through the academy ranks and briefly being included in the club's senior squad list for Serie A and UEFA Champions League fixtures. He has since played for Rapid Wien II and Sturm Graz II in the Austrian Second League, Skënderbeu Korçë and Tirana in the Kategoria Superiore, and Dukagjini in the Kosovo Superleague.

== Club career ==
=== Lazio and early senior career ===
Tare spent more than 13 years with Lazio, progressing from the club's youth ranks to the Primavera squad. During the 2019–20 pre-season, he was included in Lazio's Primavera training camp held in Pietralunga, Umbria, alternating between the under-17 and Primavera teams. Italian media described him as "a centre forward like his father, with similar movement and hairstyle". During the 2020–21 season, he began training occasionally with the senior team and was later included in Lazio's official UEFA Champions League squad list, as required by UEFA's homegrown player regulations.

In August 2022, his contract with Lazio expired, and the club opted not to renew it—reportedly influenced by growing tensions between his father, sporting director Igli Tare, and the Lazio management, led by president Claudio Lotito.

He left Lazio after making 61 appearances with seven goals and three assists for the Primavera side. On 11 August 2022, Tare signed a three-year contract with Rapid Wien II in the Austrian Second League. He spent one season with the Viennese club, gaining experience in senior-level football.

In the summer of 2023, Tare transferred to Sturm Graz II, continuing in the Austrian Second League for another campaign.

=== Skënderbeu Korçë ===
On 29 July 2024, Tare joined Skënderbeu Korçë in the Kategoria Superiore. A month later, he was named as a Skënderbeu Korçë substitute for the first time in a league match against Partizani Tirana. His debut with Skënderbeu Korçë came on 11 September in a 3–2 home defeat against Teuta after coming on as a substitute at 83rd minute in place of Yuri Merlim. His spell with the club was short-lived, as both parties mutually agreed to part ways on 31 January 2025.

=== Dukagjini ===
On 17 January 2025, Tare signed with Dukagjini of the Kosovo Superleague. He scored his first goal for the club six days later in a pre-season friendly against Chornomorets Odesa, and also featured in a Kosovar Cup fixture. His official debut with Dukagjini came on 7 February in a 1–0 away defeat against Ballkani after coming on as a substitute at 70th minute in place of Altin Merlaku.

=== Tirana ===
On 15 July 2025, Tare joined Tirana in the Kategoria Superiore, marking his return to Albanian football and becoming the club's seventh signing of the summer ahead of the 2025–26 season. On 23 August 2025, he was named as a Tirana substitute for the first time in a league match against Bylis. His debut with Tirana came a month later in a 2–1 home defeat in the derby against Dinamo City after coming on as a substitute at 46th minute in place of Alfred Mensah. On 3 December 2025, Tare scored his first goal for Tirana in his fourth appearance for the club in a 6–2 away defeat over Dinamo City in matchday 14.

== Personal life ==
Tare comes from a well-known Albanian football family. He was born in Brescia in 2003 while his father, Igli Tare, was playing in Serie A as a striker, and he holds German citizenship through his mother. He has a younger brother named Liam. His grandfather, Isa Tare, also played for Partizani Tirana and later served as a club director. In 2025, Etienne attracted media attention for 'breaking family tradition' by signing with Tirana, a historic rival of Partizani.

He has two uncles, Auron, a well-known Albanian journalist and historian, and another, Agron (also referred as "Genti"), who has served as Consul General of Albania in Istanbul and later as director of the Port of Durrës.

== Style of play ==
As a youth player, he was first noticed in 2020 when he joined Lazio's Primavera pre-season training camp, where Italian media highlighted his resemblance to his father's playing style. Standing at 1.94 m, he is noted for his aerial strength, heading ability, and physical presence inside the box, traits reminiscent of his father’s playing style.

== Career statistics ==
=== Club ===
As of match played 8 December 2025

Appearances and goals by club, season and competition
| Club | Season | League | | | Cup | | Other | | Total | |
| Club | Season | Division | Apps | Goals | Apps | Goals | Apps | Goals | Apps | Goals |
|---|---|---|---|---|---|---|---|---|---|---|
| Rapid Wien II | 2022–23 | Austrian Second League | 1 | 0 | — | | — | | 1 | 0 |
| Sturm Graz II | 2023–24 | Austrian Second League | 4 | 0 | — | | — | | 4 | 0 |
| Skënderbeu Korçë | 2024–25 | Kategoria Superiore | 3 | 0 | — | | — | | 3 | 0 |
| Dukagjini | 2024–25 | Kosovo Superleague | 6 | 0 | 1 | 0 | 1 | 1 | 8 | 1 |
| Tirana | 2025–26 | Kategoria Superiore | 7 | 1 | 1 | 1 | — | | 8 | 2 |
| Career total | | | 21 | 1 | 2 | 1 | 1 | 1 | 24 | 3 |
