= Juxhin Xhaja =

Albanian football referee (born 1990)

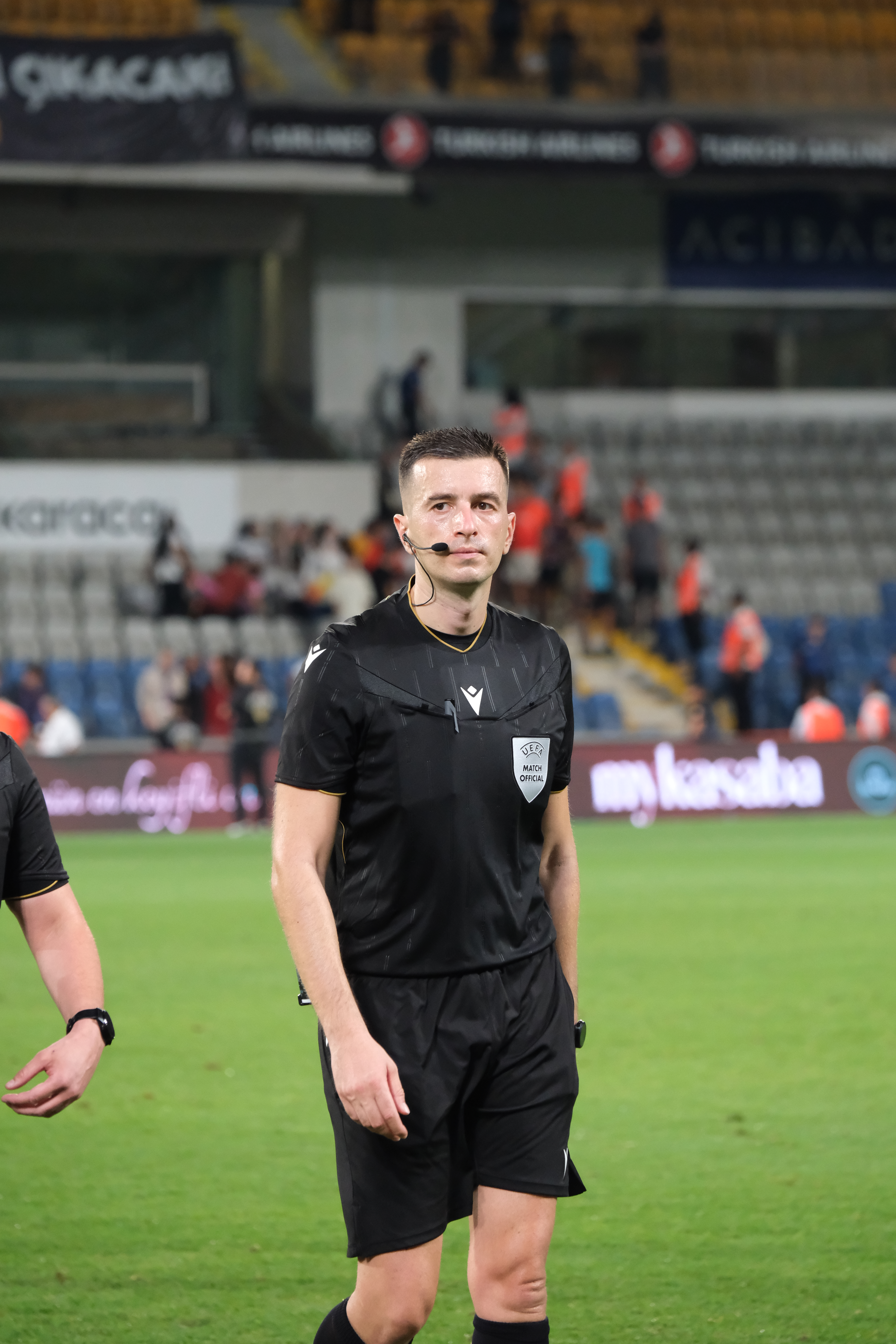
- Xhaja in 2025
- Born: 24 May 1990 (age 36); Tirana, Albania

Domestic
Years	League	Role
2016–present	Kategoria Superiore	Referee

International
Years	League	Role
2018–present	FIFA listed	Referee

Juxhin Xhaja (born 24 May 1990) is an Albanian football referee who has been listed on the FIFA International Referees List since 2018.

== Career ==
Xhaja was born in Tirana on 24 May 1990 and made his debut in the Kategoria e Parë, Albania's second division, in the 2013–14 season. He officiated matches in that league until October 2016, when he ascended to the top-tier Kategoria Superiore, overseeing the game between KF Skënderbeu and KF Vllaznia. He has also officiated at the different Tirana derbies. After earning his FIFA badge in 2018, Xhaja has taken part in several European tournaments, including the UEFA Europa League, the UEFA Conference League, and the UEFA Nations League.

In the Nations League, he oversaw matches in the 2022–23 season, including a game between Liechtenstein and Andorra in Vaduz and Estonia versus Sweden in Tallinn in the 2024–25 season.

Xhaja has also officiated in matches of the UEFA Euro 2024 qualifiers and the qualifying games of European teams for the 2026 FIFA World Cup.

In 2024, Xhaja was named the Referee of the Year Award by the Albanian Football Federation.

== Selected performances ==
UEFA Nations League
Date	Match	Result	Round	Venue
22 September 2022	Liechtenstein – Andorra	0–2	Group stage	Rheinpark Stadion
14 October 2024	Estonia – Sweden	0–3	Group stage	Lilleküla Stadium
