= 1981–82 Albanian National Championship =

Albanian National Championship
- Season: 1981–82
- Champions: 17 Nëntori; 11th Albanian title
- Relegated: 31 Korriku; 24 Maji
- European Cup: Labinoti
- UEFA Cup: None
- Cup Winners' Cup: Dinamo Tirana
- Matches: 182
- Goals: 344 (1.89 per match)
- Top goalscorer: Vasil Ruci (12 goals)

The 1981–82 Albanian National Championship was the 43rd season of the Albanian National Championship, the top professional league for association football clubs, since its establishment in 1930.

== Overview ==
It was contested by 14 teams, and 17 Nëntori won the championship.

== League table ==
Pos	Team	Pld	W	D	L	GF	GA	GD	Pts	Qualification or relegation
1	17 Nëntori (C)	26	15	7	4	42	15	+27	37	Qualification for the European Cup first round
2	Flamurtari	26	13	7	6	26	12	+14	33	
3	Dinamo Tirana	26	14	4	8	33	19	+14	32	Qualification for the Cup Winners' Cup first round
4	Partizani	26	11	9	6	31	18	+13	31	
5	Vllaznia	26	11	8	7	37	26	+11	30	
6	Tomori	26	10	6	10	21	18	+3	26	
7	Besëlidhja	26	9	7	10	22	27	−5	25	
8	Besa	26	9	7	10	20	28	−8	25	
9	Lokomotiva Durrës	26	8	8	10	19	24	−5	24	
10	Naftëtari	26	5	13	8	23	25	−2	23	
11	Luftëtari	26	8	7	11	22	24	−2	23	
12	Labinoti	26	9	4	13	17	27	−10	22	
13	31 Korriku (R)	26	5	10	11	22	37	−15	20	Relegation to the 1982–83 Kategoria e Dytë
14	24 Maji (R)	26	4	5	17	9	44	−35	13	Relegation to the 1982–83 Kategoria e Dytë

Source: RSSSF.org
(C) Champions; (R) Relegated

Note: '17 Nëntori' is Tirana, 'Lokomotiva Durrës' is Teuta, 'Labinoti' is Elbasani, '31 Korriku' is Burreli and '24 Maji' is Përmeti.

== Results ==
Home \ Away	17N	24M	31K	BES	BSL	DIN	FLA	LAB	LOK	LUF	NAF	PAR	TOM	VLL
17 Nëntori		6–1	4–0	4–0	3–1	0–1	0–0	3–0	2–1	2–0	2–1	0–0	1–0	1–1
24 Maji	0–3		1–0	1–1	1–1	0–1	0–2	0–0	0–1	1–0	0–0	0–2	1–0	0–0
31 Korriku	0–0	2–1		2–0	1–1	2–1	1–0	0–0	0–0	2–2	2–3	1–0	0–0	1–1
Besa	0–0	3–0	1–0		1–0	1–2	1–0	1–0	4–0	1–0	1–1	1–1	0–2	1–0
Besëlidhja	1–2	3–0	1–0	2–2		0–1	1–0	2–1	0–0	2–0	1–0	0–1	1–0	0–4
Dinamo	2–2	2–1	2–2	5–2	1–0		0–0	3–0	0–1	0–0	1–0	0–1	4–0	4–1
Flamurtari	0–1	1–0	1–0	3–0	2–0	1–0		2–0	1–0	0–1	1–1	1–1	2–0	1–0
Labinoti	1–0	2–0	1–0	1–0	0–1	0–1	1–0		2–1	1–1	2–0	2–0	1–0	1–1
Lokomotiva	2–1	0–1	1–0	1–0	1–1	1–0	1–1	1–0		0–0	0–0	1–1	2–1	2–3
Luftëtari	0–1	1–0	5–0	1–0	1–0	0–1	0–1	3–1	2–0		1–1	0–0	1–2	2–1
Naftëtari	0–1	3–0	2–2	0–0	0–0	2–0	2–2	1–0	3–1	1–1		1–2	0–0	1–1
Partizani	1–1	5–0	2–2	1–2	3–0	0–1	0–1	1–0	3–1	2–0	0–0		2–0	2–0
Tomori	2–0	2–0	3–0	1–0	0–1	1–0	0–0	1–0	0–0	3–0	2–0	0–0		1–1
Vllaznia	0–2	3–0	4–2	0–0	2–2	1–0	1–3	4–0	1–0	1–0	2–0	3–0	1–0	

Source: CalcioMondialeWeb.it
Legend: Blue = home team win; Yellow = draw; Red = away team win.

== Season statistics ==
=== Top scorers ===
Rank	Player	Club	Goals
1	(Albania) Vasil Ruci	Flamurtari	12
2	(Albania) Agustin Kola	17 Nëntori	10
3	(Albania) Faruku	31 Korriku	8
4	(Albania) Genc Tomorri	Partizani	7
4	(Albania) Sulejman Mema	17 Nëntori	7
4	(Albania) Ferid Rragami	Vllaznia	7
