= 2002–03 Albanian Cup =

Kupa e Shqipërisë

Tournament details
- Country: Albania

Final positions
- Champions: Dinamo Tirana
- Runners-up: Teuta

2002–03 Albanian Cup (Albanian: Kupa e Shqipërisë) was the fifty-first season of Albania's annual cup competition. It began on 30 August 2002 with the First Round and ended on 31 May 2003 with the Final match. The winners of the competition qualified for the 2003–04 first round of the UEFA Europa League. Tirana were the defending champions, having won their twelfth Albanian Cup last season. The cup was won by Dinamo Tirana.

The rounds were played in a two-legged format similar to those of European competitions. If the aggregated score was tied after both games, the team with the higher number of away goals advanced. If the number of away goals was equal in both games, the match was decided by extra time and a penalty shootout, if necessary.

== First round ==
Games were played on 30 August – 6 September 2002.

Team 1	Agg.	Team 2	1st leg	2nd leg
Skënderbeu	1–8	Dinamo Tirana	0–4	1–4
Naftëtari	1–3	Teuta	0–2	1–1
Laçi	1–13	Vllaznia	1–4	0–9
Dajti	2–5	Shkumbini	2–3	0–2
Albpetrol	2–7	Lushnja	0–3	2–4
Minatori Tepelena	2–8	Flamurtari	2–2	0–6
Minatori Memaliaj	1–2	Apolonia	1–0	0–2
Përparimi	1–6	Besëlidhja	1–1	0–5
Përmeti	0–6	Bylis	0–0	0–6
Butrinti	3–6	Luftëtari	2–2	1–4
Egnatia	4–1	Tomori	3–0	1–1
Gramozi	1–11	Elbasani	1–5	0–6
Burreli	2–6	Besa	2–0	0–6
Kastrioti	0–4	Erzeni	0–2	0–2
Sopoti	1–1	Tirana	1–1	0–0
Pogradeci	2–7	Partizani	2–4	0–3

== Second round ==
Games were played on 22 & 29 January 2003.

Team 1	Agg.	Team 2	1st leg	2nd leg
Erzeni	1–2	Flamurtari	1–0	0–2
Apolonia	1–4	Shkumbini	1–1	0–3
Egnatia	3–5	Teuta	0–3	3–2
Besëlidhja	3–6	Lushnja	2–3	1–3
Luftëtari	2–5	Dinamo Tirana	0–3	2–2
Elbasani	2–6	Vllaznia	1–4	1–2
Bylis	1–6	Partizani	1–2	0–4
Besa	0–1	Tirana	0–0	0–1

== Quarter-finals ==
In this round entered the 8 winners from the previous round. Games were played on 22 February – 8 March 2003.

Team 1	Agg.	Team 2	1st leg	2nd leg
Vllaznia	2–2	Partizani	0–0	2–2
Flamurtari	1–2	Teuta	0–0	1–2
Lushnja	0–0 (2–3 p)	Dinamo Tirana	0–0	0–0
Shkumbini	2–6	Tirana	2–4	0–2

== Semi-finals ==
In this round entered the four winners from the previous round. Games were played on 23 April – 7 May 2003.

Team 1	Agg.	Team 2	1st leg	2nd leg
Teuta	3–2	Vllaznia	2–1	1–1
Tirana	1–4	Dinamo Tirana	0–2	1–2

23 April 2003	Teuta	2–1	Vllaznia	Niko Dovana Stadium, Durrës
	Begeja 65'; Zëre 73'		Asllani 76'	Referee: Sokol Jareci

7 May 2003	Vllaznia	1–1	Teuta	Loro Boriçi Stadium, Shkodër
	Bejzade 62'		Memelli 6'	Referee: Bujar Pregja

Teuta advanced to the final.

23 April 2003	Tirana	0–2	Dinamo Tirana	Selman Stermasi Stadium, Tirana
			Qorri 70', 77'	Referee: Sokol Çekaj

7 May 2003	Dinamo Tirana	2–1	Tirana	Qemal Stafa Stadium, Tirana
	Tiko 41', 61'		Xhafa 14'	Referee: Sokol Velçani

Dinamo Tirana advanced to the final.

== Final ==
31 May 2003
18:00 UTC+1

Dinamo Tirana	1–0	Teuta
Zyambo 54'

Qemal Stafa Stadium, Tirana
Attendance: 8,400
Referee: (Italy) Gianluca Paparesta
