= Mirko Bortoletti =

Italian footballer

Personal information
- Date of birth: 19 November 1998 (age 27)
- Place of birth: Milan, Italy
- Height: 1.87 m (6 ft 2 in)
- Position: Midfielder

Team information
- Current team: Celle Varazze
- Number: 21

Youth career
- –2016: Pistoiese
- 2016–2018: Torino

Senior career*
Years	Team	Apps	(Gls)
2017–2018	Torino	0	(0)
2017–2018	→ Vis Pesaro (loan)	25	(0)
2018–2019	Fidelis Andria	33	(4)
2019–2020	Pistoiese	21	(0)
2020–2021	Arezzo	10	(3)
2021–2022	Novara	23	(2)
2022	Fidelis Andria	7	(0)
2022–2023	Chieri	24	(1)
2023	Villa Valle	10	(0)
2023–	Atletico Castegnato	10	(0)
2023–	AVC Vogherese	32	(1)
2023–	Celle Varazze	25	(2)
- * Club domestic league appearances and goals as of 25 June 2026

Mirko Bortoletti (born 19 November 1998) is an Italian professional footballer who plays as a midfielder for Serie D club Celle Varazze.

== Career ==
Born in Milan, Bortoletti started his career in Pistoiese and Torino youth sector. As a senior, he was loaned to Serie D club Vis Pesaro in 2017–18 season.

In August 2018, he left Torino and signed with Serie D club Fidelis Andria.

For the 2019–20 seasons, he returned to Pistoiese in Serie C. Bortoletti made his professional debut on 25 August against AlbinoLeffe.

On 2 September 2020, he moved to Arezzo.

On 28 January 2021, he joined Serie C club Novara.

On 17 January 2022, he returned to Fidelis Andria.

On 23 July 2022, Bortoletti moved to Chieri in Serie D.
