= 1982–83 Kategoria e Dytë =

Kategoria e Dytë
- Season: 1982–83
- Champions: 31 Korriku
- Promoted: 31 Korriku
- Relegated: 5 Shtatori; 24 Maji

The 1982–83 Kategoria e Dytë was the 36th season of a second-tier association football league in Albania.

== League table ==
Pos	Team	Pld	W	D	L	GF	GA	GD	Pts	Promotion or relegation
1	31 Korriku (C, P)	26	14	5	7	33	20	+13	33	Promotion to 1983–84 National Championship
2	Minatori (T)	26	14	4	8	34	35	−1	32	Qualification to the Promotion playoff
3	Kastrioti	26	11	8	7	33	26	+7	30	
4	Apolonia	26	11	6	9	30	21	+9	28	
5	Erzeni	26	9	10	7	29	22	+7	28	
6	Shkumbini	26	10	7	9	32	26	+6	27	
7	Vetëtima	26	10	7	9	29	29	0	27	
8	Bistrica	26	10	6	10	26	31	−5	26	
9	Shkëndija Tiranë	26	8	9	9	30	30	0	25	
10	Përparimi	26	9	6	11	27	31	−4	24	
11	Tërbuni	26	8	8	10	18	25	−7	24	
12	Butrinti	26	9	5	12	28	32	−4	23	
13	5 Shtatori (R)	26	9	4	13	23	28	−5	22	Relegation to 1983–84 Kategoria e Tretë
14	24 Maji (R)	26	3	9	14	17	33	−16	15	Relegation to 1983–84 Kategoria e Tretë

(C) Champions; (P) Promoted; (R) Relegated

== Relegation/promotion playoff ==
Team 1	Agg.	Team 2	1st leg	2nd leg
Minatori	3–5	Naftëtari	1–4	2–1
