= Aristotel Koleci =

Albanian footballer

Personal information
- Date of birth: 23 March 1993 (age 33)
- Place of birth: Mirditë, Albania
- Position: Midfielder

Team information
- Current team: Burreli
- Number: 8

Youth career
- 2010–2012: Kamza

Senior career*
Years	Team	Apps	(Gls)
2012–2017	Kamza	94	(7)
2017–2019	Tomori	38	(3)
2019–2020	Besëlidhja	20	(3)
2020–2021	Besa Kavajë	3	(0)
2021–	Burreli	99	(5)
- * Club domestic league appearances and goals as of 28 April 2024

Aristotel Koleci (born 23 March 1993) is an Albanian footballer who plays for Burreli.
