= Roberto Sorrentino =

Italian footballer and manager

Personal information
- Full name: Roberto Sorrentino
- Date of birth: 14 August 1955 (age 71)
- Place of birth: Naples, Italy
- Height: 1.80 m (5 ft 11 in)
- Position: Goalkeeper

Youth career
- 1974–1976: Napoli

Senior career*
Years	Team	Apps	(Gls)
1976–1977	Nocerina	34	(0)
1977–1979	Paganese	65	(0)
1979–1984	Catania	163	(0)
1984–1988	Cagliari	85	(0)
1988–1990	Bologna	12	(0)
Total		359	(0)

Managerial career
- 1991–1995: Juventus (goalkeeper)
- 1995–1996: Palazzolo
- 1996–1997: Fasano
- 1997–1998: Frosinone Calcio
- 1998–2002: Torino (youth)
- 2002–2003: Taranto
- 2003–2004: Martina Franca
- 2004–2005: Castellettese
- 2005–2007: Vigevano
- 2007–2008: Atletico Cagliari
- 2008–2009: Seregno
- 2009–2010: Derthona
- 2010–2011: Luco Canistro
- 2011–2012: Vigevano
- 2012–2013: Voghera
- 2013: Ragusa
- 2013–2014: Teuta Durrës
- 2016–2018: Gassino San Raffaele
- 2019–2020: Cervo
- 2020–2021: Torinese
- 2022–2023: Chieri
- * Club domestic league appearances and goals

Roberto Sorrentino (born 14 August 1955 in Naples) is an Italian football manager and former player, who played as a goalkeeper.

== Playing career ==
As a goalkeeper, he played for several clubs in Italy, but is mainly remembered for his time with Catania, and even served as the club's captain.

== Coaching career ==
He has worked as head coach for a number of minor league Italian teams, as well as Albanian Superliga club Teuta Durrës.

In June 2022, he was hired by Serie D club Chieri, a few months after his son Stefano was appointed club chairman. He left the club by the end of the season.

== Personal life ==
Roberto is the father of Italian goalkeeper Stefano Sorrentino.
