= Stefano Sorrentino =

Italian footballer

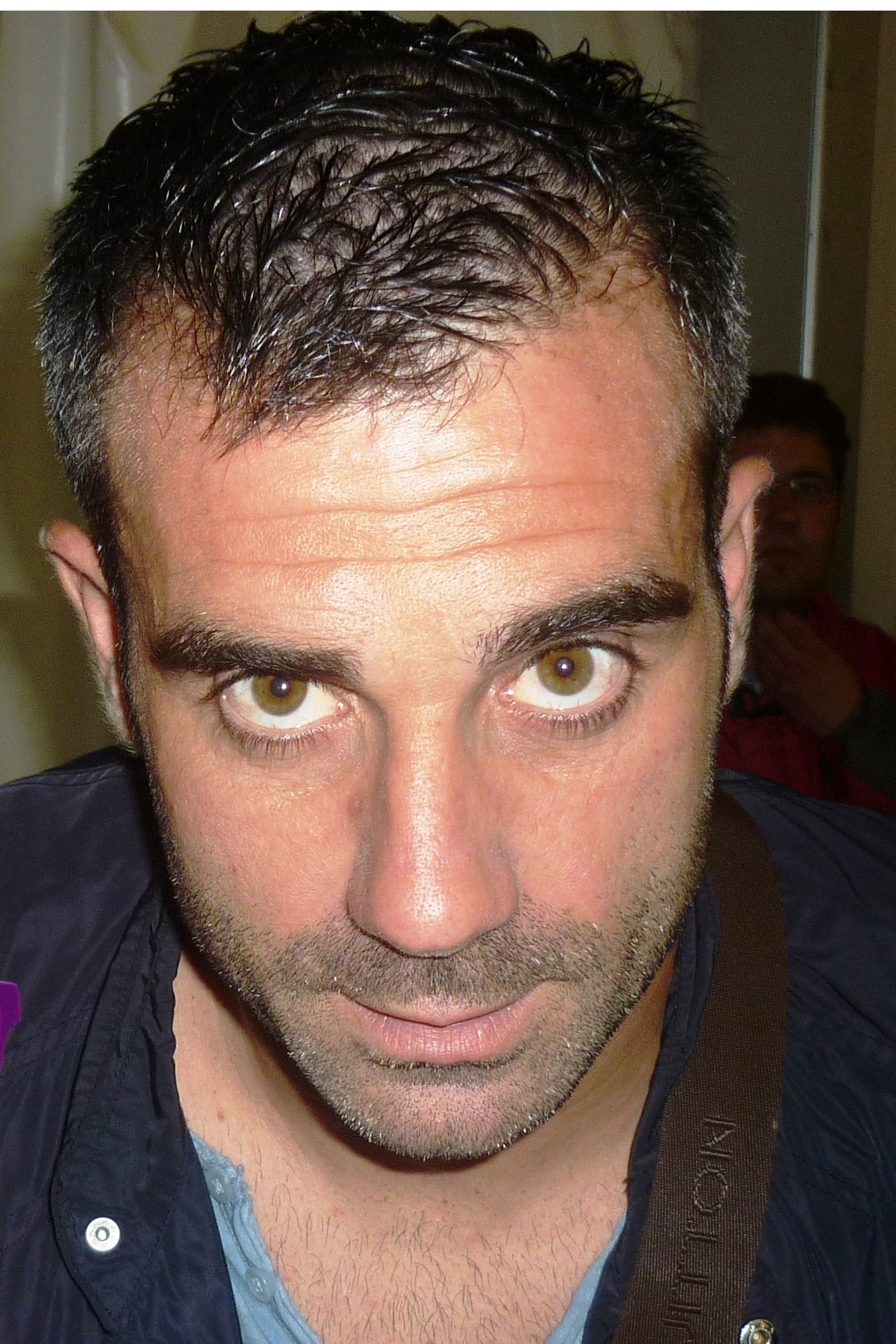
- Sorrentino in 2012

Personal information
- Full name: Stefano Sorrentino
- Date of birth: 28 March 1979 (age 47)
- Place of birth: Cava de' Tirreni, Italy
- Height: 1.86 m (6 ft 1 in)
- Position: Goalkeeper

Youth career
- 1996–1997: Lazio
- 1997–1998: Juventus

Senior career*
Years	Team	Apps	(Gls)
1998–2005	Torino	89	(0)
1999–2000	→ Juve Stabia (loan)	0	(0)
2000–2001	→ Varese (loan)	0	(0)
2005–2009	AEK Athens	50	(0)
2007–2008	→ Recreativo (loan)	38	(0)
2008–2009	→ Chievo (loan)	32	(0)
2009–2013	Chievo	131	(0)
2013–2016	Palermo	117	(0)
2016–2019	Chievo	103	(0)
2019–2020	F.C. Cervo		
2020–2021	Torinese		
- * Club domestic league appearances and goals as of 9 February 2020

Stefano Sorrentino (born 28 March 1979) is an Italian former footballer. A professional goalkeeper for his whole career, he is currently a football agent.

Sorrentino played for several Italian clubs throughout his career, being mainly known for his time with Torino, Chievo and Palermo, winning a Serie B title and promotion to Serie A with the latter side in the 2013–14 season. Abroad, he represented AEK Athens in Greece and Recreativo in Spain.

== Club career ==
=== Early years / Torino ===
Born in Cava de' Tirreni, Campania, Sorrentino started playing football with S.S. Lazio, finishing his youth training with Juventus FC in 1997 and failing to collect any official first-team appearances during his one-season spell. In the summer of 1998 he joined Torino FC in Serie B, only playing once in the league.

In the next two years, Sorrentino played in Serie C1, representing S.S. Juve Stabia and A.S. Varese 1910 on loan. He returned to Torino in the 2001 off-season, being a backup in the top division (twelve games) and an undisputed starter in the second level during his tenure; in his final campaign he made 43 league appearances for Toro, who finished second and promoted via the playoffs, only to be denied due to financial irregularities.

=== AEK Athens ===
In the 2005 off-season, however, the Turin-based club declared bankruptcy and released all their players. On 7 July 2005 Sorrentino signed with AEK Athens. He immediately was established as the main goalkeeper of the team, but after the birth of his daughter, he requested from president, Demis Nikolaidis to let him return to Italy, because his wife was not feeling comfortable enough in Greece. However, the club did not receive a suitable offer for the player and Sorrentino displayed a professional behaviour and continued at the club. On 21 November 2006 he had a top-notch performance in a 1–0 home win against AC Milan for the group stage of the UEFA Champions League, also being named Player of the match.

On 16 July 2007 Sorrentino was eventually loaned to Recreativo de Huelva, for a fee of €340,000 with the Spanish side having the option to sign him on a full basis at the end of season. He made his La Liga debut on 26 August in a 1–1 home draw to Real Betis, and eventually appeared in all league games as the Andalusians eventually avoided relegation, ranking 16th.

=== Chievo ===
After Recreativo did not exercise the buy-out option, on 3 July 2008 Sorrentino returned to his country and was loaned to the newly-promoted Chievo Verona for a fee of €200,000 and an option to buy. He played in 32 league games during the season as the team retained their newly found status, and the move was made permanent on 15 July 2009 for a fee of €600,000 and a 20% of a resale fee.

On 30 June 2010, Chievo was reported to have agreed with Genoa to swap Sorrentino for Riccardo Meggiorini, as well as signing Brazilian Rubinho as their new goalkeeper. However, the deal collapsed as Meggiorini moved to Bologna FC 1909; in the following campaigns, he continued to perform solidly.

=== Palermo ===
On 25 January 2013, after a long negotiation, Sorrentino signed a 3 1/2-year contract with U.S. Città di Palermo for €4 million. (Note: Palermo used special tactics to book the contract value of Sorrentino, with Palermo borrowing him for €2 million with the obligation to buy for €1 million. Additionally, Palermo also bought back 50% of Gabriele Zerbo's rights for €1 million, which the club would use to book €2 million of his contract's accounting value as well as a financial income due to co-ownership for €999,500. The temporary deal was partially counter-weighed by the financial income. Thus, the operation gave Palermo a capital cost of €3 million but split over two players in separate amortization schedules.) He made his debut two days later, in a 1–1 draw at Cagliari Calcio.

=== Return to Chievo ===
On 1 July 2016, 37-year-old Sorrentino agreed to a two-year deal with former side Chievo for an undisclosed fee. He continued to be first-choice during his second spell at the Stadio Marc'Antonio Bentegodi.

In April 2019, it was announced that Sorrentino's contract would not be renewed, meaning that he would be leaving after eight seasons. He did not appear in any of the final matches, however, as he was left out of the squad once their top-tier relegation had been sealed mathematically, and posted on Twitter before the final fixture: "I would have liked to wear these gloves tomorrow. To say goodbye to my fans and my teammates. 271 appearances with this shirt. I would've imagined a different ending. An ending with the 'Eyes of the Tiger.' But beyond the players, there is the shirt. For this, I will always say: THANK YOU, CHIEVO!" In total, he collected 271 appearances with the club in all competitions, with his final appearance coming in a 3–1 home loss to SSC Napoli on 14 April, a result which sealed the team's fate. Ahead of their final fixture of the campaign, where they finished last, he posted on Twitter: "I wish to whoever will take my place, to whoever will take my locker, to whoever will wear the Chievo shirt after me, to sweat, struggle, and fight. Always with the eyes of the tiger. Because I will always carry this shirt and this changing room in my heart. Thank you to everyone." However, he also later announced that he would not be retiring from football and that he would continue to play and look for a new team after becoming a free agent, in the hope of playing his 400th Serie A match.

=== Retirement and amateur career ===
On 21 January 2020, Sorrentino announced his retirement from professional football on Sky Sport's television program Calciomercato. However, on 27 January 2020, Sorrentino announced his transfer to Seconda Categoria side Cervo, coached by his father Roberto, and that he would play as a striker.

In June 2021, he retired permanently and fully engaged in his new career as a football agent, representing Palermo goalkeeper Alberto Pelagotti.

In March 2022, he acquired a majority stake of Serie D club Chieri. He left the club in July 2023.

== Style of play ==
Sorrentino was known for his penalty-stopping abilities as well as his shot-stopping, reflexes and ability to produce decisive saves. Experienced and consistent, he also drew praise for his work-rate, determination, leadership and longevity. With 14 stops in 363 appearances between 2001 and 2019, he has parried the joint–seventh–most penalties in Serie A history, alongside Francesco Antonioli.

Sorrentino noted that his position on the pitch tended to change depending on whether he was playing behind a three or four-man back-line; in the former case, he usually played in a deeper position closer to the goal. Antonio Di Natale described him as one of the best Italian goalkeepers of his generation.

Although primarily a goalkeeper, Sorrentino came out of retirement to play as a striker in the lower divisions of Italian football.

== Three-sided football ==
Sorrentino played in a three-sided football tournament held in Madrid, in June 2018.

== Personal life ==
Sorrentino's father, Roberto, was also a goalkeeper, who acted as captain for Calcio Catania. He has two brothers.

On 9 June 2002, Sorrentino married Antonella Parrella in Turin – the couple had already been living together for ten months. Together they had three daughters, Carlotta, Matilda and Maria Vittoria; they later separated.

Sorrentino has been in a relationship with Sara Ruggeri since 2012. He and his partner have a daughter, Viola, who was born on 16 September 2013. On 31 December 2018, he proposed to her by giving her a pair of his goalkeeping gloves with the text "Sara, mi vuoi sposare?" (Sara, do you want to marry me?). He later announced his engagement on his official Instagram account by posting a picture of Ruggeri with the gloves and her engagement ring, with the caption "HA DETTO SÌ!!!!" ("She said yes!"); the couple were wed on 27 May 2019.

In March 2017, Sorrentino released his autobiography: Gli occhi della Tigre ("The eyes of the Tiger," in Italian).

== Career statistics ==
Appearances and goals by club, season and competition
Club	Season	League			Cup		Europe		Other		Total	
Club	Season	Division	Apps	Goals	Apps	Goals	Apps	Goals	Apps	Goals	Apps	Goals
Torino	1998–99	Serie B	1	0	0	0	—		—		1	0
Torino	2001–02	Serie A	4	0	2	0	—		—		6	0
Torino	2002–03	Serie A	8	0	2	0	—		—		10	0
Torino	2003–04	Serie B	43	0	0	0	—		—		43	0
Torino	2004–05	Serie B	33	0	3	0	—		4	0	40	0
Torino	Total		89	0	7	0	—		4	0	100	0
Juve Stabia (loan)	1999–00	Serie C	0	0	6	0	—		—		6	0
Varese (loan)	2000–01	Serie C	0	0	2	0	—		—		2	0
AEK Athens	2005–06	Super League Greece	25	0	1	0	2	0	—		28	0
AEK Athens	2006–07	Super League Greece	25	0	0	0	9	0	—		34	0
AEK Athens	Total		50	0	1	0	11	0	—		62	0
Recreativo (loan)	2007–08	La Liga	38	0	0	0	—		—		38	0
Chievo (loan)	2008–09	Serie A	32	0	0	0	—		—		32	0
Chievo	2009–10	Serie A	37	0	1	0	—		—		38	0
Chievo	2010–11	Serie A	37	0	0	0	—		—		37	0
Chievo	2011–12	Serie A	37	0	0	0	—		—		37	0
Chievo	2012–13	Serie A	20	0	1	0	—		—		21	0
Chievo	Chievo total		163	0	2	0	—		—		165	0
Palermo	2012–13	Serie A	15	0	0	0	—		—		15	0
Palermo	2013–14	Serie B	32	0	2	0	—		—		34	0
Palermo	2014–15	Serie A	35	0	0	0	—		—		35	0
Palermo	2015–16	Serie A	35	0	1	0	—		—		36	0
Palermo	Total		117	0	3	0	—		—		120	0
Chievo	2016–17	Serie A	34	0	2	0	—		—		36	0
Chievo	2017–18	Serie A	38	0	1	0	—		—		39	0
Chievo	2018–19	Serie A	31	0	0	0	—		—		31	0
Chievo	Total		103	0	3	0	—		—		106	0
Career total			560	0	24	0	11	0	4	0	599	0

== Honours ==
Palermo

- Serie B: 2013–14

== Bibliography ==
- Stefano Sorrentino, Marco Dell'Olio, Gli occhi della Tigre, Florence, Mandragora, 2017, ISBN 978-88-74-61326-7 (The eyes of the Tiger). (in Italian)
