= 1997–98 Kategoria e Dytë =

Kategoria e Dytë
- Season: 1997–98
- Champions: Burreli
- Promoted: Burreli
- Relegated: Amaro Divas Romët; Stërbeqi; Turbina; Përmeti

The 1997–98 Kategoria e Dytë was the 51st season of a second-tier association football league in Albania.

== Group A ==
Pos	Team	Pld	W	D	L	GF	GA	GD	Pts	Qualification or relegation
1	Kastrioti	10	8	1	1	15	5	+10	25	Qualification to the Promotion playoff
2	Shkodra	10	7	2	1	26	6	+20	23	
3	Albanët	10	5	2	3	20	9	+11	17	
4	Erzeni	10	4	1	5	14	18	−4	13	
5	Iliria	10	1	3	6	6	17	−11	6	
6	Amaro Divas Romët (R)	10	0	1	9	4	30	−26	1	Relegation to 1998–99 Kategoria e Tretë

(R) Relegated

== Group B ==
Pos	Team	Pld	W	D	L	GF	GA	GD	Pts	Qualification or relegation
1	Burreli (C, P)	10	7	2	1	23	7	+16	23	Qualification to the Promotion playoff
2	Besëlidhja	10	6	3	1	15	7	+8	21	
3	Porto Shëngjin	10	3	3	4	10	11	−1	12	
4	Korabi	10	3	2	5	12	18	−6	11	
5	Përparimi	10	3	1	6	7	13	−6	10	
6	Stërbeqi (R)	10	1	3	6	9	20	−11	6	Relegation to 1998–99 Kategoria e Tretë

(C) Champions; (P) Promoted; (R) Relegated

== Group C ==
Pos	Team	Pld	W	D	L	GF	GA	GD	Pts	Qualification or relegation
1	Egnatia	10	5	5	0	10	4	+6	20	Qualification to the Promotion playoff
2	Plugu	10	4	6	0	12	6	+6	18	
3	Naftëtari	10	3	4	3	13	11	+2	13	
4	Durrësi	10	2	6	2	10	7	+3	12	
5	Pogradeci	10	2	2	6	10	18	−8	8	
6	Turbina (R)	10	1	3	6	7	16	−9	6	Relegation to 1998–99 Kategoria e Tretë

(R) Relegated

== Group D ==
Pos	Team	Pld	W	D	L	GF	GA	GD	Pts	Qualification or relegation
1	Minatori	10	8	2	0	19	2	+17	26	Qualification to the Promotion playoff
2	Gramozi	10	6	2	2	23	12	+11	20	
3	Bistrica	10	3	3	4	14	15	−1	12	
4	Butrinti	10	3	3	4	13	18	−5	12	
5	Tepelena	10	3	2	5	15	18	−3	11	
6	Përmeti (R)	10	1	0	9	5	24	−19	3	Relegation to 1998–99 Kategoria e Tretë

(R) Relegated

== Championship/promotion playoff ==
=== Semi-finals ===
Team 1	Score	Team 2
Minatori	2–0	Kastrioti
Burreli	1–0	Egnatia

=== Final ===
Team 1	Score	Team 2
Burreli	2–1	Minatori

- Burreli was promoted to 1998–99 National Championship.
