= Gentian Stojku =

Albanian footballer and coach

Personal information
- Date of birth: 22 July 1974 (age 52)
- Place of birth: Elbasan, Albania
- Position: Midfielder

Senior career*
Years	Team	Apps	(Gls)
1992–1994	Elbasani	41	(7)
1995–1996	Shkumbini	14	(3)
1996–1997	Elbasani	16	(5)
1997–1998	Erzgebirge Aue	31	(7)
1999	Elbasani	3	(1)
1999–2000	Teuta	30	(9)
2000–2001	Pfullendorf	11	(0)
2001–2004	Elbasani	50	(18)
2004–2005	Egnatia	8	(2)
2005–2006	Shkumbini	14	(1)
2006–2007	Elbasani	17	(0)
2007–2008	Vllaznia	29	(10)
2008	Elbasani	1	(0)
2008–2009	Shkumbini	16	(6)
2009	Elbasani	21	(2)
2010	Gramshi	18	(6)
2010–2011	Bylis	1	(0)

International career^{‡}
1994	Albania	1	(0)

Managerial career
- 2012–2013: Gramshi
- 2014–2015: Sopoti
- 2015–2016: Pogradeci
- 2016–2017: Tomori
- 2018: Erzeni
- 2019: Kamza
- 2019: Apolonia
- 2019: Burreli
- * Club domestic league appearances and goals as of 16 May 2009 ‡ National team caps and goals as of 16 May 2009

Gentian Stojku (born 22 July 1974) is an Albanian former football midfielder and football coach who most recently was the head coach of Burreli in the Albanian First Division.

== Playing career ==
=== Club ===
He started his career at KF Elbasani, and then played at Shkumbini, Elbasani for a second time, Erzgebirge Aue, Elbasani for a third time, Teuta, SC Pfullendorf, Elbasani for a fourth time, Egnatia, Shkumbini for a second time, Elbasani for a fifth time, Vllaznia and Elbasani for a sixth time.

=== International ===
He made his debut for Albania in a May 1994 friendly match away against Macedonia, in which he was substituted before half time by Edi Martini. It proved to be his sole international game.

== Managerial career ==
After retiring as a player, Stojku became coach of former club Gramshi and later managed Sopoti and Pogradeci.

In November 2016 he was named manager of Tomori and Stojku was succeeded by Gentian Begeja as coach of Erzeni in February 2019, when Stojku joined Kamza. He left Apolonia Fier in June 2019 after keeping them in the Albanian First Division and he was dismissed by Burreli in October 2019.
