= 1983–84 Albanian National Championship =

Albanian National Championship
- Season: 1983–84
- Champions: Labinoti; 1st Albanian title
- Relegated: 31 Korriku
- European Cup: Labinoti
- UEFA Cup: None
- Cup Winners' Cup: None
- Matches: 182
- Goals: 328 (1.8 per match)
- Top goalscorer: Vasil Ruci (12 goals)

The 1983–84 Albanian National Championship was the 45th season of the Albanian National Championship, the top professional league for association football clubs, since its establishment in 1930.

== Overview ==
It was contested by 14 teams, and Labinoti won the championship.

== League table ==
Pos	Team	Pld	W	D	L	GF	GA	GD	Pts	Qualification or relegation
1	Labinoti (C)	26	15	7	4	26	14	+12	37	Qualification for the European Cup first round
2	17 Nëntori	26	10	14	2	34	18	+16	34	
3	Partizani	26	10	10	6	25	23	+2	30	
4	Flamurtari	26	10	9	7	30	23	+7	29	
5	Lokomotiva Durrës	26	8	9	9	30	29	+1	25	
6	Besa	26	8	9	9	20	22	−2	25	
7	Skënderbeu	26	6	13	7	15	18	−3	25	
8	Vllaznia	26	9	6	11	28	24	+4	24	
9	Tomori	26	7	10	9	16	19	−3	24	
10	Luftëtari	26	6	12	8	29	34	−5	24	
11	Dinamo Tirana	26	5	13	8	23	23	0	23	
12	Naftëtari	26	7	8	11	22	28	−6	22	
13	Traktori (O)	26	6	10	10	18	25	−7	22	Qualification for the relegation play-offs
14	31 Korriku (R)	26	7	6	13	12	28	−16	20	Relegation to the 1984–85 Kategoria e Dytë

Source: RSSSF.org
(C) Champions; (O) Play-off winners; (R) Relegated

Note: Labinoti is Elbasani, '17 Nëntori' is Tirana, 'Lokomotiva Durrës' is Teuta, 'Traktori' is Lushnja, '31 Korriku' is Burreli

== Results ==
Home \ Away	17N	31K	BES	DIN	FLA	LAB	LOK	LUF	NAF	PAR	SKË	TOM	TRA	VLL
17 Nëntori		2–0	1–1	0–0	0–0	2–0	2–1	3–2	2–0	1–1	5–1	1–1	4–1	1–0
31 Korriku	1–1		1–0	0–1	1–1	0–1	1–0	2–0	1–0	0–1	1–0	0–0	2–1	0–2
Besa	1–1	4–0		1–0	1–0	1–0	1–1	1–1	1–0	1–1	1–0	2–0	0–0	1–0
Dinamo	0–1	3–0	1–0		2–0	1–2	3–3	2–2	3–3	0–1	1–1	2–0	0–0	1–1
Flamurtari	1–1	2–0	2–1	1–0		3–0	4–2	4–1	2–0	0–0	1–0	0–0	0–0	2–1
Labinoti	0–0	1–0	1–0	2–0	1–0		1–0	0–3	1–0	1–1	2–0	2–0	3–0	1–0
Lokomotiva	2–0	1–1	0–0	1–1	0–0	0–0		4–2	3–0	2–1	1–1	2–1	2–0	2–0
Luftëtari	1–1	1–0	0–0	1–0	3–1	1–1	1–1		0–0	0–0	0–0	2–2	1–1	0–1
Naftëtari	2–1	0–0	2–1	0–0	2–3	0–1	0–2	1–2		2–1	0–0	1–0	2–0	1–1
Partizani	0–0	3–0	1–0	2–1	1–0	1–2	1–0	2–5	0–3		0–0	2–0	1–0	2–1
Skënderbeu	1–1	0–0	0–0	0–0	2–0	0–0	2–0	0–0	1–0	3–1		1–0	0–0	0–1
Tomori	0–0	2–0	2–0	0–0	1–1	0–0	2–0	1–0	0–1	0–0	0–0		0–2	2–0
Traktori	0–0	1–0	2–0	1–1	1–1	0–2	3–0	1–0	1–1	1–1	2–0	0–1		0–1
Vllaznia	1–3	0–1	5–1	0–0	2–1	1–1	1–0	5–0	1–1	0–0	1–2	0–1	2–0	

Source: CalcioMondialeWeb.it
Legend: Blue = home team win; Yellow = draw; Red = away team win.

== Relegation/promotion playoff ==
Team 1	Agg.	Team 2	1st leg	2nd leg
Traktori	2–1	Apolonia	2–0	0–1

== Season statistics ==
=== Top scorers ===
Rank	Player	Club	Goals
1	(Albania) Vasil Ruci	Flamurtari	12
2	(Albania) Bujar Hado	Lokomotiva Durrës	11
3	(Albania) Astrit Boni	Luftëtari	9
4	(Albania) Shkëlqim Muça	17 Nëntori	8
4	(Albania) Hasan Lika	Partizani	8
