= Ogert Muka =

Albanian footballer

Personal information
- Date of birth: 10 September 1979 (age 47)
- Place of birth: Lushnjë, Albania
- Position: Midfielder

Senior career*
Years	Team	Apps	(Gls)
1998–2001	Lushnja	45	(1)
2001–2002	Teuta	32	(2)
2002–2003	Dinamo Tirana	9	(1)
2003–2004	Bylis	0	(0)
2004–2004	Flamurtari	13	(1)
2004–2005	Partizani	0	(0)
2005–2006	Besa	1	(0)
2006	Teuta	6	(0)
2006–2007	Partizani	0	(0)
2009	Memaliaj	5	(0)

International career^{‡}
2002	Albania	2	(0)
- * Club domestic league appearances and goals as of 16 January 2018 (UTC) ‡ National team caps and goals as of 16 January 2018 (UTC)

Ogert Muka (born 10 September 1979) is a retired Albanian footballer. During his club career, Muka played for KS Lushnja, KF Teuta Durrës, FK Dinamo Tirana, KF Bylis Ballsh, Flamurtari Vlorë, FK Partizani Tirana and Besa Kavajë. He made 2 appearances for the Albania national team.

== International career ==
He made his debut for Albania in a January 2002 Bahrain Tournament match against Finland and earned a total of 2 caps, scoring no goals. His other international was against Bahrain at the same tournament.

== Honours ==
Albanian Cup: 2002–03
