= 1984–85 Kategoria e Dytë =

Kategoria e Dytë
- Season: 1984–85
- Champions: Apolonia
- Promoted: Apolonia; Shkëndija Tiranë
- Relegated: Bistrica; Turbina

The 1984–85 Kategoria e Dytë was the 38th season of a second-tier association football league in Albania.

== League table ==
Pos	Team	Pld	W	D	L	GF	GA	GD	Pts	Promotion or relegation
1	Apolonia (C, P)	26	16	6	4	47	20	+27	38	Promotion to 1985–86 National Championship
2	Shkëndija Tiranë (P)	26	11	10	5	31	19	+12	32	Promotion to 1985–86 National Championship
3	Korabi	26	12	4	10	26	27	−1	28	
4	Minatori (T)	26	10	7	9	26	27	−1	27	
5	Butrinti	26	10	6	10	36	35	+1	26	
6	Vetëtima	26	9	8	9	35	34	+1	26	
7	Kastrioti	26	8	10	8	27	27	0	26	
8	Shkumbini	26	9	7	10	23	25	−2	25	
9	24 Maji	26	8	9	9	22	26	−4	25	
10	31 Korriku	26	10	4	12	28	29	−1	24	
11	Erzeni	26	9	6	11	27	29	−2	24	
12	Sopoti	26	7	10	9	29	32	−3	24	
13	Bistrica (R)	26	9	5	12	21	28	−7	23	Relegation to 1985–86 Kategoria e Tretë
14	Turbina (R)	26	3	2	21	20	40	−20	8	Relegation to 1985–86 Kategoria e Tretë

(C) Champions; (P) Promoted; (R) Relegated

Note: 8 more losses than wins are displayed in the table.
