= 1999–2000 Albanian Cup =

Kupa e Shqipërisë

Tournament details
- Country: Albania

Final positions
- Champions: Teuta
- Runners-up: Lushnja

1999–2000 Albanian Cup (Albanian: Kupa e Shqipërisë) was the forty-eighth season of Albania's annual cup competition. It began on August 21, 1999, with the First Round and ended on May 6, 2000, with the Final match. The winners of the competition qualified for the 2000-01 first round of the UEFA Europa League. Tirana were the defending champions, having won their tenth Albanian Cup last season. The cup was won by Teuta.

The rounds were played in a two-legged format similar to those of European competitions. If the aggregated score was tied after both games, the team with the higher number of away goals advanced. If the number of away goals was equal in both games, the match was decided by extra time and a penalty shootout, if necessary.

== First round ==
Games were played on August 21 & 28, 1999.

| Team 1 | Agg. | Team 2 | 1st leg | 2nd leg |
|---|---|---|---|---|
| Albanët Tirana | 1–4 | Partizani | 1–1 | 0–3 |
| Albpetrol | 3–14 | Lushnja | 3–6 | 0–8 |
| Besëlidhja | 2–4 | Besa | 2–0 | 0–4 |
| Delvina | 1–5 | Bylis | 0–4 | 1–1 |
| Plugu | 3–8 | Teuta | 2–4 | 1–4 |
| Ilir Viking | 1–4 | Shkumbini | 1–1 | 0–3 |
| Kastrioti | 0–5 | Tirana | 0–3 | 0–2 |
| Përparimi | 5–2 | Laçi | 3–0 | 2–2 |
| Naftëtari | 0–9 | Tomori | 0–3 | 0–6 |
| Memaliaj | 2–9 | Shqiponja | 0–4 | 2–5 |
| Porto Shëngjin | 0–4 (w/o) | Dinamo Tirana | 0–2 (w/o) | 0–2 (w/o) |
| Pogradeci | 1–2 | Elbasani | 0–0 | 1–2 |
| Egnatia | 2–12 | Flamurtari | 2–6 | 0–6 |
| Sopoti | 1–10 | Skënderbeu | 1–5 | 0–5 |
| Tepelena | 1–6 | Apolonia | 1–3 | 0–3 |
| Shkodra | 0–5 | Vllaznia | 0–2 (w/o) | 0–3 |

== Second round ==
Games were played on January 22 & 29, 2000.

| Team 1 | Agg. | Team 2 | 1st leg | 2nd leg |
|---|---|---|---|---|
| Skënderbeu | 1–3 | Bylis | 1–0 | 0–3 |
| Partizani | 1–4 | Shkumbini | 0–2 (w/o) | 1–2 |
| Besa | 2–3 | Lushnja | 1–2 | 1–1 |
| Flamurtari | 1–4 | Teuta | 1–1 | 0–3 |
| Shqiponja | 1–1 (2–4 p) | Tomori | 1–0 | 0–1 |
| Apolonia | 1–3 | Vllaznia | 1–0 | 0–3 |
| Elbasani | 1–5 | Dinamo Tirana | 1–2 | 0–3 |
| Përparimi | 2–8 | Tirana | 1–1 | 1–7 |

== Quarter-finals ==
In this round entered the 8 winners from the previous round. Games were played on February 3 & 13, 2000.

| Team 1 | Agg. | Team 2 | 1st leg | 2nd leg |
|---|---|---|---|---|
| Dinamo Tirana | 2–1 | Tomori | 2–0 | 0–1 |
| Shkumbini | 2–2 (4–3 p) | Vllaznia | 1–1 | 1–1 |
| Lushnja | 1–1 (a) | Bylis | 0–0 | 1–1 |
| Teuta | 0–0 (4–3 p) | Tirana | 0–0 | 0–0 |

== Semi-finals ==
In this round entered the four winners from the previous round. Games were played on April 12 & 19, 2000.

| Team 1 | Agg. | Team 2 | 1st leg | 2nd leg |
|---|---|---|---|---|
| Teuta | 2–2 (a) | Dinamo Tirana | 0–1 | 2–1 |
| Shkumbini | 3–3 (1–3 p) | Lushnja | 3–0 | 0–3 |

| 12 April 2000 | Teuta | 0–1 | Dinamo Tirana | Tefik Jashari Stadium, Shijak |
| | | | Pisha 52' (pen.) | Referee: Myrteza Allkja |

| 19 April 2000 | Dinamo Tirana | 1–2 | Teuta | Qemal Stafa Stadium, Tirana |
| | Muça 8' | | Ahmataj 43'; Stojku 64' | Referee: Bujar Pregja |

Teuta advanced to the final.

| 12 April 2000 | Shkumbini | 3–0 | Lushnja | Shkumbini Stadium, Peqin |
| | Tosku 36'; Xhetani 38'; Kola 43' | | | Referee: Bujar Pregja |

| 19 April 2000 | Lushnja | 3–0 (a.e.t.) (3−1 p) | Shkumbini | Abdurrahman Roza Haxhiu Stadium, Lushnjë |
| | Elezi 25'; Malko 50' (pen.); Bano 90+1' | | | Referee: Sazan Velçani |
| | Penalties |
| | Çuko (penalty scored); Muka (penalty missed); Gazheli (penalty scored); Toshkollari (penalty scored) | | (penalty missed) Kola; (penalty missed) Tosku; (penalty scored) K. Dervishi; (penalty missed) Kaja |

Lushnja advanced to the final.

== Final ==
6 May 2000
18:00

| Teuta | 0–0 | Lushnja |
Penalties
| Muça (penalty scored); Bespalla (penalty scored); Prenga (penalty scored); Babamusta (penalty scored); Tole (penalty scored) | 5–4 | (penalty missed) Gazheli; (penalty scored) Çuko; (penalty scored) Muka; (penalty scored) Ar. Hysko; (penalty scored) Malko |

Qemal Stafa Stadium, Tirana
Attendance: 11,000
Referee: Luan Zylfo
