= Anesti Vito =

Albanian footballer (1971–2023)

Personal information
- Full name: Anesti Vito
- Date of birth: 19 June 1971
- Place of birth: Vlorë, Albania
- Date of death: 25 July 2023 (aged 52)
- Position: Striker

Youth career
- –1992: Flamurtari

Senior career*
Years	Team	Apps	(Gls)
1992–1997	Flamurtari	100	(29)
1993	→ Albpetrol (loan)	11	(3)
1999	Flamurtari	17	(8)
2000	Tirana	20	(8)
2000–2004	Flamurtari	68	(18)
2002	→ Tomori (loan)	9	(2)
Total		225	(68)
- * Club domestic league appearances and goals

Anesti Vito (19 June 1971 – 25 July 2023) was an Albanian football player who played as a striker.

== Club career ==
Vito played the majority of his career for hometown club Flamurtari, with whom he won the 1991 league title. He played two Cup Winners' Cup matches for Albpetrol in 1993.

In summer 2001, Vito scored in an Intertoto Cup game for Bylis Ballsh.

== Death ==
Vito died from a suspected cardiac arrest on 25 July 2023, at the age of 52.

== Honours ==
- Albanian Superliga: 1

1991, 2000
