= Vladimir Gjoni =

Albanian footballer and manager

Personal information
- Full name: Vladimir Gjoni
- Date of birth: 15 January 1970 (age 56)
- Place of birth: Burrel, Albania
- Position: Forward

Team information
- Current team: Erzeni (manager)

Senior career*
Years	Team	Apps	(Gls)
1992-1993	Kastrioti	26	(5)
1993-1995	Laçi	20	(4)
1998–1999	Burreli	27	(10)
1999–2000	Shkumbini	23	(14)
2000	Luftëtari	11	(2)
2001–2002	Shkumbini	28	(12)
2002	Lushnja	6	(1)
2003	Besëlidhja	1	(0)
2003–2004	Flamurtari		(0)
2009–2010	Luftëtari		

Managerial career
- 2010–2011: Burreli
- 2013–2015: Burreli
- 2015: Luftëtari
- 2015: Burreli
- 2016: Egnatia
- 2017: Egnatia
- 2018-2019: Besëlidhja
- 2019-: Erzeni
- * Club domestic league appearances and goals

Vladimir Gjoni (born 15 January 1970) is an Albanian football manager and former player.

== Managerial career ==
He was put in charge of hometown club Burreli in December 2013 and in June 2014, Gjoni's contract as coach was extended after steering the club to safety in his first half season at the club. In December 2018, he was appointed manager of Besëlidhja Lezhë.

He succeeded Gentian Begeja as manager of Erzeni Shijak in October 2019.
