= Akileu Ndreca =

Footballer (born 2004)

Personal information
- Date of birth: 6 December 2000 (age 25)
- Place of birth: Shkodër, Albania
- Height: 1.83 m (6 ft 0 in)
- Position: Centre-forward

Team information
- Current team: Campodarsego

Youth career
- 2012–2016: Brians
- 2016–2018: Porto Lissus
- –2019: Vllaznia

Senior career*
Years	Team	Apps	(Gls)
2019–2020	Montebelluna	13	(5)
2020–2021	Union Clodiense	35	(11)
2021	Montebelluna	7	(11)
2021–2022	Union Clodiense	37	(5)
2022–2023	Ravenna	21	(2)
2023–2024	Mestre	30	(9)
2024–2025	Tirana	35	(8)
2025	Prishtina	3	(0)
2026–	Campodarsego	4	(0)
- * Club domestic league appearances and goals as of 22 February 2026

Akileu Ndreca (born 6 December 2000) is an Albanian professional footballer who plays as a centre-forward for Italian Serie D club Campodarsego.

== Career statistics ==
=== Club ===
As of 9 January 2024

Club	Season	League			Cup		Continental		Other		Total	
Club	Season	Division	Apps	Goals	Apps	Goals	Apps	Goals	Apps	Goals	Apps	Goals
Tirana	2024–25	Kategoria Superiore	18	5	1	0	1	0	—		19	5
Tirana	Total		18	5	1	0	1	0	—		19	5
Career total			18	5	1	0	0	0	0	0	19	5
