= Rafa =

Rafa is a masculine given name, mostly as a diminutive form (hypocorism) of Rafael. It may refer to:

== People ==
- Rafael Nadal (born 1986), Spanish tennis player
- Rafa (footballer, born 1985), Spanish footballer Rafael López Gómez
- Rafael Benítez (born 1960), Spanish football manager and former player
- Rafa Cabrera-Bello (born 1984), Spanish golfer
- Rafa Gálvez (born 1993), Spanish footballer
- Rafa Gil (born 1975), Spanish football manager
- Rafa Gómez (born 1983), Spanish footballer
- Rafa (footballer, born 1970), Spanish retired football goalkeeper
- Rafa Jordà (born 1984), Spanish footballer
- Rafa Luz (born 1992), Spanish basketball player
- Rafael Márquez (born 1979), Mexican footballer
- Rafa Martínez (born 1982), Spanish basketball player
- Rafa Minato (born 1996), Brazilian politician
- Rafa Mir (born 1997), Spanish footballer
- Rafa Navarro (footballer, born 1994), Spanish footballer
- Rafael Páez (born 1994), Spanish footballer
- Rafa Pérez (born 1990), Colombian footballer
- Rafael Ponzo (born 1978), Venezuelan football goalkeeper
- Rafa Rodríguez (born 2003), Spanish footballer
- Rafa Silva (born 1993), Portuguese footballer
- Rafa Soares (born 1995), Portuguese footballer
- Rafa Villar (born 1968), Spanish writer and poet
- Rafael Câmara (born 2005), Brazilian racing driver

== Fictional characters ==
- Rafa, in the TV series Royal Pains
