= Robert Grizha =

Albanian footballer

Personal information
- Full name: Robert Grizha
- Date of birth: 10 March 1982 (age 44)
- Place of birth: Lezhë, Albania
- Height: 1.94 m (6 ft 4 in)
- Position: Defender

Senior career*
Years	Team	Apps	(Gls)
2000–2001	Besëlidhja	7	(0)
2001–2006	Partizani	26	(0)
2006–2007	Besëlidhja	17	(1)
2007–2008	Vorskla Poltava	0	(0)
2008–2009	Besa	36	(1)
2009–2010	Kastrioti	14	(2)
2010–2011	Skënderbeu	13	(1)
2011–2012	Shkumbini	8	(0)
2012–2013	Lushnja	20	(2)
- * Club domestic league appearances and goals

Robert Grizha (born 10 March 1982) is an Albanian former professional footballer who played as a defender.

== Club career ==
He played as a defender for Partizani Tirana in the Albanian First Division.

In 2012, he controversially joined Lushnja on a one-year contract after Partizani also claimed to have reached an agreement with Grizha.
