= ASD Chieri =

Italian football club

A.S.D. Chieri
- Full name: Associazione Sportiva Dilettantistica Chieri
- Nicknames: Azzurri (The Blues); Collinari
- Founded: 1955
- Ground: Stadio Comunale, Chieri, Italy
- Capacity: 3,077
- Chairman: Stefano Sorrentino
- Manager: Roberto Sorrentino
- League: Eccellenza
- 2021–22: 8th
Home colours	Away colours

Associazione Sportiva Dilettantistica Chieri is an Italian association football club, founded in 1955 and based in Chieri, Piedmont. The team currently plays in Eccellenza.

The team's colors are white and light blue.

== Honors ==
- Coppa Italia Serie D
  - Champions: 2016–17
