= 1998–99 Kategoria e Dytë =

Kategoria e Dytë
- Season: 1998–99
- Champions: Shqiponja
- Promoted: Shqiponja
- Relegated: Porto Shëngjin; Iliria; Albanët; Eorest; Plugu; Egnatia; Divjaka; Bistrica

The 1998–99 Kategoria e Dytë was the 52nd season of a second-tier association football league in Albania.

== Group A ==
Pos	Team	Pld	W	D	L	GF	GA	GD	Pts	Qualification or relegation
1	Besëlidhja	15	14	1	0	35	7	+28	43	Qualification to the Promotion playoff
2	Porto Shëngjin (R)	15	11	2	2	33	12	+21	35	Relegation to 1999–2000 Kategoria e Tretë
3	Shkodra	15	7	3	5	29	24	+5	24	
4	Përparimi	15	2	5	8	10	23	−13	11	
5	Korabi	15	1	5	9	11	29	−18	8	
6	Iliria (R)	15	1	2	12	10	33	−23	5	Relegation to 1999–2000 Kategoria e Tretë

(R) Relegated

== Group B ==
Pos	Team	Pld	W	D	L	GF	GA	GD	Pts	Qualification or relegation
1	Albpetrol	15	11	1	3	40	13	+27	34	Qualification to the Promotion playoff
2	Albanët (R)	15	9	3	3	33	13	+20	30	Relegation to 1999–2000 Kategoria e Tretë
3	Kastrioti	15	9	3	3	36	20	+16	30	
4	Durrësi	15	2	6	7	14	27	−13	12	
5	Erzeni	15	2	4	9	23	41	−18	10	
6	Eorest (R)	15	2	3	10	19	51	−32	9	Relegation to 1999–2000 Kategoria e Tretë

(R) Relegated

== Group C ==
Pos	Team	Pld	W	D	L	GF	GA	GD	Pts	Qualification or relegation
1	Naftëtari	15	10	3	2	30	14	+16	33	Qualification to the Promotion playoff
2	Sopoti	15	9	2	4	21	16	+5	29	
3	Pogradeci	15	7	3	5	28	21	+7	24	
4	Plugu (R)	15	5	5	5	25	24	+1	20	Relegation to 1999–2000 Kategoria e Tretë
5	Egnatia (R)	15	4	3	8	18	27	−9	15	Relegation to 1999–2000 Kategoria e Tretë
6	Divjaka (R)	15	0	4	11	16	36	−20	4	Relegation to 1999–2000 Kategoria e Tretë

(R) Relegated

== Group D ==
Pos	Team	Pld	W	D	L	GF	GA	GD	Pts	Qualification or relegation
1	Shqiponja (C, P)	15	13	1	1	30	4	+26	40	Qualification to the Promotion playoff
2	Tepelena	15	11	1	3	43	14	+29	34	
3	Minatori	15	6	1	8	14	16	−2	19	
4	Bistrica (R)	15	3	4	8	8	18	−10	13	Relegation to 1999–2000 Kategoria e Tretë
5	Butrinti	14	3	3	8	11	32	−21	12	
6	Gramozi	14	2	2	10	13	35	−22	8	

(C) Champions; (P) Promoted; (R) Relegated

== Championship/promotion playoff ==
=== Semi-finals ===
Team 1	Score	Team 2
Albpetrol	1–0	Naftëtari
Shqiponja	1–0	Besëlidhja

=== Final ===
Team 1	Score	Team 2
Shqiponja	1–0	Albpetrol

- Shqiponja was promoted to 1999–2000 National Championship.
