= Tirana derbies =

Association football rivalry

- Location: Tirana, Albania
- Teams: KF Tirana; Dinamo Tirana; Partizani Tirana

Statistics
- Largest victory: Partizani Tirana 8-0 KF Tirana

The term Tirana derby (Albanian: derbi i Tiranës) refers to the local derbies in Tirana played between two of the three professional football clubs KF Tirana, Dinamo or Partizani. It specifically refers to individual matches between the clubs, but can also be used to describe the general ongoing rivalry between the clubs, players and / or fans.

Tirana is the only city in Albania hosting three professional football clubs and the only one to have more than one professional club.

== Rivalries ==
=== KF Tirana v Partizani ===
The Big Derby is the name given to any match contested between KF Tirana and Partizani Tirana football clubs, the two biggest rivals in the capital-city Tirana of Albania. Matches between the 2 teams have a long history and have almost always made the first page of the news in the country, with high tensions between fans in stands and the players. Since 2008 however, Partzani's relegation, the derby faded away for a while until their return for the 2013–14 season. Since then the derby once again rose in importance.

KF Partizani have a historical advantage of 20 wins and 50 goals in the league.

=== Dinamo v KF Tirana ===
The rivalry between KF Tirana and Dinamo Tirana, is one of the longest currently running top-flight derbies in Albania. The two are the most successful clubs from the city. KF Tirana dominates either historically, or during last 25 seasons against the Dinamo. However, they have equal ties in the Cup competition.

=== Dinamo v Partizani ===
The derby between Partizani Tirana and Dinamo Tirana has been contested numerous time and equally evokes strong emotions. As the two teams had varies fortunes recently, both period away from the top flight, the derby has risen in importance. As Dinamo were historically linked to the Ministry of Internal Affairs and as Partizani were linked to the National Liberation Movement this fixture is often derogatorily referred to as "the communist derby".
