= Ilir Qorri =

Albanian footballer

Personal information
- Full name: Ilir Qorri
- Date of birth: 11 July 1975 (age 51)
- Place of birth: Elbasan, Albania
- Height: 1.76 m (5 ft 9 in)
- Position: Striker

Youth career
- –1998: KF Elbasani

Senior career*
Years	Team	Apps	(Gls)
1992–1999	Elbasani	151	(7)
1999	Bylis	3	(0)
2000–2004	Dinamo Tirana	83+	(35+)
2004	Khazar		(1)
2005	Dinamo Tirana	15	(1)
2005–2006	Elbasani	27	(4)
2006–2007	Dinamo Tirana	29	(4)
2007–2008	Shkumbini	26	(6)
2008	Teuta	9	(0)
2009	Elbasani	9	(0)
- * Club domestic league appearances and goals as of 20 May 2015

Ilir Qorri (born 11 July 1975) is an Albanian retired football player who started his career as a defender but also played as a striker for a number of Albanian Superliga sides including KF Elbasani and Dinamo Tirana.

== Honours ==
=== Club ===
Dinamo Tirana

- Albanian Superliga (1): 2001–02
- Albanian Cup (1): 2002–03

KF Elbasani

- Albanian Superliga (1): 2005–06
