= Edi Martini =

Albanian football player and manager

Personal information
- Full name: Eduard Martini
- Date of birth: 2 January 1975 (age 51)
- Place of birth: Shkodër, Albania
- Height: 1.74 m (5 ft 9 in)
- Position: Midfielder

Senior career*
| Years | Team | Apps | (Gls) |
| 1992–1994 | Vllaznia | 41 | (22) |
| 1994–1995 | Vevce Donit filtri | 20 | (9) |
| 1995–1996 | SAK Klagenfurt | | |
| 1996–1997 | Vllaznia | 15 | (9) |
| 1997–1999 | Eintracht Frankfurt | 1 | (0) |
| 1999–2000 | Vllaznia | 8 | (8) |
| 2000 | Luftëtari | 13 | (5) |
| 2000–2002 | Vllaznia | 26 | (13) |
| 2003 | Besëlidhja | 2 | (0) |
| 2003–2004 | Vllaznia | 36 | (18) |
| 2004–2006 | Apolonia | 29 | (5) |
| Total | | 191 | (89) |

International career
| 1994–1995 | Albania | 2 | (0) |

Managerial career
- 2007–2008: Luftëtari
- 2008–2009: Laçi
- 2009–2010: Vllaznia
- 2010–2011: Teuta
- 2012–2013: Luftëtari
- 2019–2025: Teuta
- 2025: Trepça
- 2025–2026: Vllaznia
- * Club domestic league appearances and goals

Eduard "Edi" Martini (born 2 January 1975) is an Albanian football manager and former player.

== Playing career ==
=== Club ===
During his playing career, Martini represented mostly Vllaznia Shkodër but also played abroad with Slovenian Vevce, Austrian SAK Klagenfurt and Eintracht Frankfurt in Germany. He fled war-torn Albania for Germany in 1997 after a match in Spain along with teammate Adrian Dashi.

=== International ===
Martini made his international debut for Albania on 14 May 1994 during the 5–1 away defeat to Macedonia, appearing as a first-half substitute for Gentian Stojku. A year later, on 16 August 1995, he made his second appearance in a 2–1 upset to Malta, playing full-90 minutes.

== Managerial career ==
=== Vllaznia Shkodër ===
On 29 December 2009, Martini was named as the new manager of his boyhood club Vllaznia Shkodër, and started working with the team on 4 January 2010. He remained in the duty until the end of 2009–10 campaign, with Vllaznia Shkodër who missed the European competitions for only four points and was runner-up in Albanian Cup, losing in the final to Besa Kavajë.

=== Teuta Durrës ===
On 9 June 2010, Martini become the new coach of fellow Albanian Superliga side Teuta Durrës, signing a contract until the end of the season, taking the duty over Ylli Shehu. During the season, Teuta Durrës struggled to find results and finished league in 7th place, tied with Kastrioti Krujë and Shkumbini Peqin with 42 points. In 2010–11 Albanian Cup, Teuta didn't go beyond the second round, where they were eliminated by Skënderbeu Korçë 2–0 on aggregate. Following the end of the season, Martini left the team after the club's president, Edmond Hasanbelli, decided not to extend his contract for the next season.

=== Luftëtari Gjirokastër ===
On 30 October 2012, Martini was appointed as head coach at Luftëtari Gjirokastër.

=== Trepça ===
On 16 February 2025, Martini was appointed as the head coach of Trepça.

== Honours ==
=== Player ===
Eintracht Frankfurt

- 2. Bundesliga: 1997–98

=== Manager ===
Teuta

- Kategoria Superiore: 2020–21
- Albanian Cup: 2019–20

== Career statistics ==
As of 15 February 2016

Albania national team
| Year | Apps | Goals |
|---|---|---|
| 1994 | 1 | 0 |
| 1995 | 1 | 0 |
| Total | 2 | 0 |
