= Gentian Begeja =

Albanian footballer and coach

Personal information
- Full name: Gentian Begeja
- Date of birth: 23 June 1973 (age 53)
- Place of birth: Durrës, PR Albania
- Position: Striker

Team information
- Current team: Erzeni (Head coach)

Youth career
- –1976: Flamurtari

Senior career*
Years	Team	Apps	(Gls)
1993–2004	Teuta		
2004–2005	Shkumbini		(11)

Managerial career
- 2007: Teuta Durrës
- 2012–2013: Teuta
- 2013–2014: Teuta U-17
- 2014–2015: Teuta
- 2016: Teuta
- 2018: Teuta
- 2018: Besa
- 2019–: Erzeni
- * Club domestic league appearances and goals

Gentian Begeja (born 23 June 1973 in Durrës) is an Albanian former football player and coach who spent his entire career with Teuta Durrës

== Managerial career ==
Begeja succeeded Gentian Stojku as coach of Erzeni Shijak in February 2019.
