= KS Burreli =

Albanian football club

Burreli
- Full name: Klubi Sportiv Burreli
- Nickname: 31 Korriku
- Founded: 1928; 98 years ago as Deja Deja (1928–45) 31 Korriku (1945–51) Puna Burrel (1951–58) 31 Korriku (1958–91) Burreli (1951–present)
- Ground: Liri Ballabani Stadium
- Capacity: 2,500
- President: Agron Malaj
- Manager: Klevis Dalipi
- League: Kategoria e Parë
- 2025–26: Kategoria e Parë, 7th
Home colours	Away colours

Klubi Sportiv Burreli is an Albanian football club based in Burrel. Their home ground is the Liri Ballabani Stadium and they compete in the Kategoria e Parë.

== History ==
The club was founded in 1928, but was not an organised club until 1935 under the name Deja Burrel. The name was changed in 1945 to 31 Korriku Burreli, which was again changed in 1951 to Puna Burrel. Between 1958 and 1991 the club was renamed 31 Korriku Burrel before changing to its current name Burreli.

The club competed in the lower leagues of Albania until 1981 when they participated in the Albanian National Championship for the first time. But they were relegated in their first top flight season after finishing bottom of the table during the 1981–82 season. They were back in the top division after just one season in the Kategoria e Parë and were part of the 1983–84 Albanian National Championship. They were relegated again for the second time in the space of just two-years after finishing rock bottom of the table, again being relegated with just 20 points through the entire season.

== Honours ==
- Kategoria e Parë:
  - Winners (4): 1980–81, 1982–83, 1997–98
  - Runners-up (1): 1986–87
- Kategoria e Dytë:
  - Winners (1): 1959

Minor trophies

- Sporti Popullor Cup:
  - Winners (1): 1978
- Puna Cup:
  - Winners (1): 1980
- Zëri i Rinisë Cup:
  - Winners (1): 1983

== Current squad ==
As of 31 January 2024

Note: Flags indicate national team as defined under FIFA eligibility rules; some limited exceptions apply. Players may hold more than one non-FIFA nationality.

No.	Pos.	Nation	Player
—	GK	ALB	Armando Çili
—	GK	ALB	Sinan Dani
—	DF	ALB	Aleks Dedgjonaj
—	DF	ALB	Patrik Fetaj
—	DF	NGR	Dickson Idakwo
—	DF	ALB	Xhuljan Kapllanaj (on loan from Vllaznia Shkodër)
—	DF	KOS	Endrit Kastrati
—	DF	FRA	Jean-Queeneye Mendes
—	MF	FRA	Riyad Anoudi
—	MF	BRA	Deivid
—	MF	ALB	Elidon Dulaj (on loan from Vllaznia Shkodër)
—	MF	ALB	Denis Gjoka
—	MF	ALB	Uheid Hoxha

No.	Pos.	Nation	Player
—	MF	ALB	Aristotel Koleci
—	MF	ALB	Donald Kurbneshi
—	MF	BRA	Muriel
—	MF	ALB	Lorenxho Murra
—	MF	NGR	Joel Osikel
—	MF	ALB	Maringlen Stana
—	FW	ALB	Florenc Ferruku
—	FW	ALB	Robin Hoti
—	FW	BRA	Jonathan Marcelino
—	FW	BRA	Marinho
—	FW	NGR	Nnamdi Naza
—	FW	ALB	Klahos Zani

== Current staff ==
Position	Name
Head coach	(Albania) Klevis Dalipi
Assistant manager	(Albania) Endri Kaca
Goalkeeping coach	(Albania) Marjan Lleshaj
Technical director	(Albania) Klevis Gjoka

== List of managers ==
- (Albania) Robert Jashari (1980–1984)
- (Albania) Baftjar Punavia (1997–1999)
- (Albania) Baftjar Punavia (2006)
- (Albania) Elvis Plori (Jan 2012 - Jun 2012)
- (Albania) Elvis Plori (Oct 2012 - May 2013)
- (Albania) Elvis Plori (Sep 2013 - Dec 2013)
- (Albania) Vladimir Gjoni (Dec 2013 - Mar 2015)
- (Albania) Vladimir Gjoni (Aug 2015 - Dec 2015)
- (Albania) Ritvan Kulli (Feb 2016 - May 2017)
- (Albania) Julian Ahmataj (Jan 2018 - Apr 2018)
- (Albania) Ritvan Kulli (Apr 2018 - Jun 2018)
- (Albania) Stavri Nica (Aug 2018 - Oct 2018)
- (Albania) Elvis Plori (Oct 2018 - Jun 2019 )
- (Albania) Gentian Stojku (Aug 2019 - Oct 2019)
- (Albania) Alert Alcani (Oct 2019 -Jan 2021)
- (Albania) Samuel Nikaj (Feb 2021 -Apr 2021)
- (Albania) Renato Hoti (Apr 2021 -June 2021)
- (Albania) Saimir Patushi (June 2021 - Dec 2021)
- (Albania) Alert Alcani (Dec 2021 )
- (Albania) Samuel Nikaj (Feb 2021 -June 2021)
- (Albania) Renato Hoti (Jul 2022 -Jan 2023)
- (Albania) Dorian Bubeqi (Jan 2023 – Jun 2024)
- (Albania) Ditmar Bicaj (Jul 2024 – Jul 2025)
- (Albania) Samuel Nikaj (Jul 2025 - Oct 2026)
- (Albania) Klevis Dalipi (Oct 2026 -)

== Recent seasons ==
Season	Division	Pos.	Pl.	W	D	L	GS	GA	P	Cup
1999–00	2nd Division	6/9	16	5	1	10	18	31	16	2nd Round
2000–01	2nd Division	4/9	16	9	2	5	29	24	29	2nd Round
2001–02	2nd Division	9/13	24	9	4	11	28	39	31	1st Round
2002–03	2nd Division	6/11	20	8	3	9	19	23	27	1st Round
2003–04	2nd Division	6/10	18	7	2	9	15	21	23	1st Round
2004–05	1st Division	7/12	22	6	4	12	27	40	22	1st Round
2005–06	1st Division	4/11	19	10	0	9	22	24	30	—
2006–07	1st Division	5/12	22	11	4	7	29	21	37	2nd Round
2007–08	1st Division	8/11	20	7	3	10	17	26	24	1st Round
2008–09	1st Division	5/16	30	13	8	9	28	37	47	2nd Round
2009–10	1st Division	12/16	30	7	10	13	19	32	22	1st Round
2010–11	1st Division	11/16	30	10	6	14	29	37	36	1st Round
2011–12	1st Division	7/16	30	12	3	15	36	43	39	1st Round
2012–13	1st Division	7/16	30	12	6	12	32	31	42	1st Round
2013–14	1st Division	8/16	30	10	9	11	26	30	39	1st Round
2014–15	1st Division	6/10	27	10	1	16	38	45	31	1st Round
