= KF Teuta =

Albanian football club

Teuta
- Full name: Klubi i Futbollit Teuta
- Nicknames: Djemtë e Detit; Durrsakët
- Founded: 29 January 1920; 106 years ago as Klubi Sportiv Urani (Uranus Sport Club)
- Stadium: Niko Dovana Stadium
- Capacity: 12,040
- President: Fatos Troplini
- Manager: Edlir Tetova
- League: Kategoria Superiore
- 2025–26: Kategoria Superiore, 8th
- Website: kfteuta.al
| Home colours | Away colours |

Klubi i Futbollit Teuta, commonly referred to as Teuta, is an Albanian professional football club based in Durrës. The club competes in the Kategoria Superiore, the top tier of Albanian football. Their home ground is the Niko Dovana Stadium.

The club was founded on 29 January 1920 as Klubi Sportiv Urani (Uranium Sport Club), and they were a founding member of the Albanian National Championship in 1930, as well as runners-up in the 1931 National Championship. They have won the Kategoria Superiore twice in 1994 and in 2021, and they have also won the Albanian Cup four times, as well as finishing runners-up in three Albanian Supercups.

== History ==
=== Early years ===
The club was founded on 29 January 1920 as Klubi Sportiv Urani, which literally translates to Uranium Sport Club, and they changed their name to Sport Klub Durrës just two years later 1922. They kept the same name until they joined the Albania national championship as one of the original six members alongside SK Tiranë, Skënderbeu Korçë, Bashkimi Shkodran, Urani Elbasan and Sportklub Vlorë. In 1930, before entering the National Championship, the club changes its name to the Klubi Sportiv Teuta Durrës, in reference to Queen Teuta of Illyria. In the first national championship they finished fifth out of six teams, collecting three wins and two draws out of ten games. The following season they finished as runners-up in the league, as they lost 4–1 in the championship final against SK Tiranë, where the club's goalkeeper Niko Dovana famously scored the equaliser in the first leg which ended in a 1–1 draw.

After Communism took control of Albania the club was forced to change its name to KS Ylli i Kuq Durrës, literally meaning KS Red Star Durrës. Just 3 years later in 1950 the club dropped KS Red Star Durrës from its name and was simply called SK Durrës once again, before renaming to SK Puna Durrës a 1-year later in 1951. The club changed its name again in 1958 to KS Lokomotiva Durrës which they kept until the fall of Communism in Albania in 1991. Since 1991 the club has renamed KS Teuta Durrës, with the football team being called KF Teuta.

The 1994 Albanian Cup final second leg lineup against KF Tirana.

=== Hasanbelliu era ===
In 1999 local businessman and owner of Eurotech Cement Edmond Hasanbelliu he was named as the new president of the club, he brought in Hasan Lika as manager immediately. He began investing in the club and introduced Albanian internationals Sokol Prenga and Suad Liçi in the club, alongside a host of other players including Orges Shehi and Arjan Sheta. In the club's first season under Hasan Lika and Edmond Hasanbelliu they finished in third place, behind Tomori Berat and eventual winners KF Tirana. They also had a successful Albanian Cup run as they eliminated Flamurtari Vlorë, KF Tirana and Dinamo Tirana to reach the final against KS Lushnja, which ended 0–0 after extra time and Teuta won the game 5–4 on penalties. They qualified for the second qualifying round of the UEFA Cup in the following season, where they faced Austrian side SK Rapid Wien. They were eliminated following a 6–0 aggregate loss, after 4–0 and 2–0 losses.

=== Recent years ===
In November 2013 the president Hasanbelliu announced that the club had sold a 50% stake to Swiss company Gea Sport, who promised investment in the club in order to achieve domestic success as well as have good runs in Europe. The firm's first action as shareholders was to replace the Albanian coach Gugash Magani with the Italian Roberto Sorrentino, who became the club's first ever foreign coach. Following less than 2 months as shareholders Gea Sport were instrumental in bringing in 11 players during the January transfer window, most of which were foreigners, in an attempt to push for the title. On 24 February 2014, Sorrentino was fired as the first team coach following a string of poor results. The club announced the appointment of Ilir Daja the day after Sorrentino's departure.

== Stadium ==
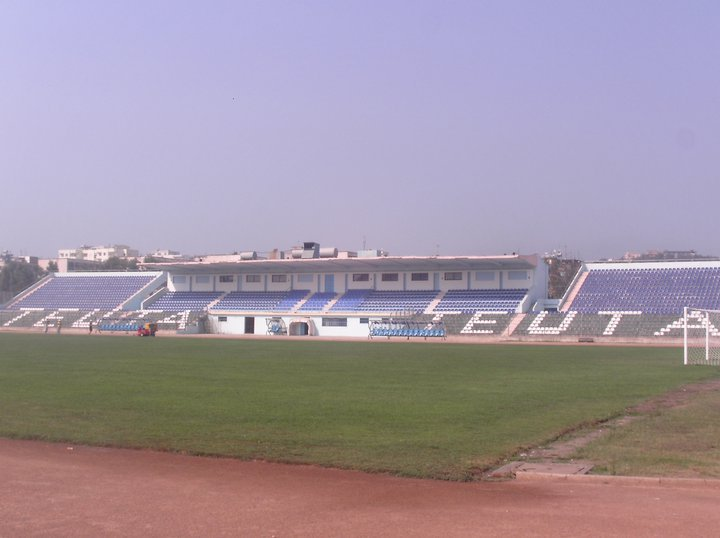
Niko Dovana Stadium

The club play their home games at the Niko Dovana Stadium which was built in 1965 and currently has a capacity of around 13,000. The stadium was previously known as the Lokomotiva Stadium between 1958 and 1991 during Communism while the club was named Lokomotiva Durrës. The stadium has also been host to the Albania national team in 2010 where they played a friendly against Uzbekistan. During the 2013–14 season, according to the club's official website the average league attendance was 2,638.

=== Record transfers ===
| Rank | Player | To | Fee | Year |
|---|---|---|---|---|
| 1. | (Albania) Emiljano Vila | (Croatia) Dinamo Zagreb | €250k | 2009 |
| 2. | (Australia) Labinot Haliti | (Poland) ŁKS Łódź | €200k | 2007 |
| 3. | (Albania) Sherif Kallaku | (Croatia) NK Lokomotiva | €150k | 2020 |
| 4. | (Albania) Elmando Gjini | (Kosovo) FC Ballkani | €120k | 2024 |
| 5. | (Albania) Arbër Çyrbja | (Albania) KF Kukësi | €100k | 2018 |
| 6. | (Albania) Ledio Beqja | (Hungary) ETO FC Győr | €100k | 2024 |

== Honours ==
- Kategoria Superiore
  - Winners: 1993–94, 2020–21
  - Runners-up: 1931, 1992–93, 1994–95, 1995–96, 2006–07, 2011–12
- Albanian Cup
  - Winners: 1994–95, 1999–2000, 2004–05, 2019–20
  - Runners-up: 1957, 1974–75, 1993–94, 2000–01, 2002–03, 2006–07
- Albanian Supercup
  - Winners: 2020, 2021
  - Runners-up: 1994, 2000, 2005
- Kategoria e Parë
  - Winners: 1959, 1961
- Sporti Popullor Cup
  - Winners: 1982
- Ylli Cup
  - Winners: 1985

== Supporters ==
Teuta's fans are known as Djemtë e Detit 1994 (Boys of the Sea). and PIRATËT 2016 (PIRATES 2016) and MARINSAT 2017 (MARINSAT 2017)

== European record ==
| Season | Competition | Round | Country | Club | Home | Away | Aggregate |
|---|---|---|---|---|---|---|---|
| 1992–93 | Balkans Cup | QF | (Bulgaria) | Beroe Stara Zagora | 1–1 | 1–0 | 2–1 (a.e.t.) |
| 1992–93 | Balkans Cup | SF | (Greece) | Edessaikos | 2–0 | 0–2 | 2–2 (3–5 pen) |
| 1994–95 | UEFA Cup | QR | (Cyprus) | Apollon Limassol | 1–4 | 2–4 | 3–8 |
| 1995–96 | UEFA Cup Winners' Cup | QR | (Finland) | TPS Turku | 3–0 | 0–1 | 3–1 |
| 1995–96 | UEFA Cup Winners' Cup | 1R | (Italy) | AC Parma | 0–2 | 0–2 | 0–4 |
| 1996–97 | UEFA Cup | 1QR | (Slovakia) | FC Kosice | 1–4 | 1–2 | 2–6 |
| 1999 | UEFA Intertoto Cup | 1R | (Iceland) | IA Akranes | 2–1 | 1–5 | 3–6 |
| 2000–01 | UEFA Cup | 2QR | (Austria) | SK Rapid Wien | 0–4 | 0–2 | 0–6 |
| 2002 | UEFA Intertoto Cup | 1R | (Malta) | Valletta | 0–0 | 2–1 | 2–1 |
| 2002 | UEFA Intertoto Cup | 2R | (Romania) | Gloria Bistrița | 1–0 | 0–3 | 1–3 |
| 2004 | UEFA Intertoto Cup | 1R | (Slovakia) | FK ZTS Dubnica | 0–0 | 0–4 | 0–4 |
| 2005–06 | UEFA Cup | 1QR | (Bosnia and Herzegovina) | NK Široki Brijeg | 3–1 | 0–3 | 3–4 |
| 2007–08 | UEFA Cup | 1QR | (Croatia) | NK Slaven Belupo | 2–2 | 2–6 | 4–8 |
| 2012–13 | UEFA Europa League | 1QR | (Georgia (country)) | FC Metalurgi Rustavi | 0–3 | 1–6 | 1–9 |
| 2013–14 | UEFA Europa League | 1QR | (Moldova) | Dacia Chișinău | 3–1 | 0–2 | 3–3 (a) |
| 2016–17 | UEFA Europa League | 1QR | (Kazakhstan) | Kairat | 0–1 | 0–5 | 0–6 |
| 2019–20 | UEFA Europa League | 1QR | (Latvia) | Ventspils | 1−0 | 0−3 | 1–3 |
| 2020–21 | UEFA Europa League | 1QR | (Israel) | Beitar Jerusalem | 2–0 | —N/a | 2–0 |
| 2020–21 | UEFA Europa League | 2QR | (Spain) | Granada | 0–4 | —N/a | 0–4 |
| 2021–22 | UEFA Champions League | 1QR | (Moldova) | Sheriff Tiraspol | 0–4 | 0–1 | 0–5 |
| 2021–22 | UEFA Europa Conference League | 2QR | (Andorra) | Inter Club d'Escaldes | 0–2 | 3−0 (aet) | 3–2 (aet) |
| 2021–22 | UEFA Europa Conference League | 3QR | (Republic of Ireland) | Shamrock Rovers | 0−2 | 0–1 | 0–3 |

- QR = Qualifying Round
- 1R = First Round
- 2R = Second Round
- 3QR = Trerd Round

== Players ==
=== Current squad ===
As of 1 September 2026

Note: Flags indicate national team as defined under FIFA eligibility rules; some limited exceptions apply. Players may hold more than one non-FIFA nationality.

| No. | Pos. | Nation | Player |
|---|---|---|---|
| 3 | DF | GRE | Vasili Zhongo |
| 4 | DF | ALB | Artan Jazxhi (captain) |
| 5 | DF | NOR | Ilir Kukleci |
| 6 | DF | ALB | Geraldo Bajrami |
| 7 | FW | ALB | Klejdi Daci |
| 8 | MF | ALB | Xhoeli Maçolli |
| 9 | FW | POR | Pedro Martelo |
| 10 | MF | ALB | Sherif Kallaku |
| 11 | MF | ALB | Muço Boçi |
| 12 | GK | ALB | Elton Vata |
| 13 | MF | ALB | Serxho Huna |
| 14 | MF | ALB | Juri Tetova |
| 16 | FW | ALB | Grei Kuqi |
| 18 | DF | ALB | Florjan Përgjoni |

| No. | Pos. | Nation | Player |
|---|---|---|---|
| 20 | MF | ALB | Esat Mala |
| 27 | MF | ALB | Kliti Muha |
| 28 | MF | ALB | Eljano Qorrasi |
| 30 | GK | FRA | Paul Bernardoni |
| 31 | DF | ALB | Gledis Troplini |
| 44 | DF | ALB | Abdurraman Fangaj |
| 59 | MF | ALB | Ergis Arifi |
| 67 | MF | ALB | Shahin Cara |
| 70 | FW | ALB | Xhovalin Trifoni |
| 73 | GK | BRA | Maycon Morales |
| 77 | DF | ALB | Ardit Toli |
| 91 | MF | NGR | Daniel Wotlai |
| 99 | FW | NGR | Mmesoma Umejiego |

=== Out on loan ===
Note: Flags indicate national team as defined under FIFA eligibility rules; some limited exceptions apply. Players may hold more than one non-FIFA nationality.

| No. | Pos. | Nation | Player |
|---|---|---|---|
| — | FW | ALB | Etrit Gjuzi (on loan at Iliria) |

== Current staff ==
| Position | Staff |
|---|---|
| President | (Albania) Fatos Troplini |
| Director | (Albania) Renato Arapi |
| Head coach | (Albania) Edlir Tetova |
| Assistant coach | (Albania) Bledar Hodo |
| Goalkeeping coach | (Albania) Bledjan Rizvani |
| Head Of Youth | (Albania) Gentian Begeja |
| Physiotherapist | (Albania) Mirban Gorenca |
| Physiotherapist & Doctor | (Albania) Ervin Shembitraku |
| Doctor | (Albania) Neritan Myderrizi |

== Records ==
- Biggest ever victory: Teuta Durrës 16–0 KF Elbasani (17 April 1932), (1932 Superliga)
- Biggest ever defeat: Teuta Durrës 0–9 KF Tirana (15 April 1934), (1934 Superliga)
- Highest league points tally: 67 points from 33 games (2006–07 Superliga)
- Lowest league points tally: 4 points from 10 games (1946 Superliga)
- Best league goal difference: +28 from 34 games (1995–96 Superliga)
- Worst league goal difference: -22 from 18 games (1937 Superliga)
- Most league wins: 20 wins from 34 games (1995–96 Superliga)
- Least league wins: 1 win from 10 games (1946 Superliga)
- Most league losses: 16 losses (1989–90), (2004–05), (2005–06 Superliga)
- Least league losses: 1 loss from 8 games (1931 Superliga)

== List of managers ==
- (Albania) Adem Karapici (1956–1957)
- (Albania) Skënder Jareci (1960)
- (Albania) Tom Gjini (1963–1964)
- (Albania) Loro Boriçi (1965–1967)
- (Albania) Refik Resmja (1971–1973)
- (Albania) Skënder Jareci (1970s)
- (Albania) Bejkush Birçe (1980s)
- (Albania) Kristaq Toçi (1990–1991)
- (Albania) Edmond Miha (1992–1993)
- (Albania) Haxhi Ballgjini (1994)
- (Albania) Bashkim Koka (1994–1996)
- (Albania) Shkëlqim Muça (Jul 1, 1996 – Jun 30, 1998)
- (Albania) Enver Shehu (1998)
- (Albania) Hasan Lika (1999–2001)
- (Albania) Hysen Dedja (2001)
- (Albania) Hasan Lika (2002)
- (Albania) Edmond Zalla (2002)
- (Albania) Hasan Lika (2003)
- (Albania) Vasil Bici (Jun 1, 2003 – Sep 18, 2003)
- (Albania) Hasan Lika (Sep 18, 2003 – Mar 13, 2004)
- (Albania) Stavri Nica (Mar 20, 2004 – Jun 1, 2004)
- (Albania) Edmond Zalla (Jul 1, 2004 – Sep 28, 2004)
- (Albania) Stavri Nica (Sep 29, 2004 – Oct 4, 2004)
- (Albania) Neptun Bajko (Oct 15, 2004 – Feb 27, 2005)
- (Albania) Stavri Nica (Feb 27, 2005 – Jun 1, 2005)
- (Albania) Hasan Lika (Jul 1, 2005 – Feb 24, 2006)
- (Albania) Stavri Nica (Mar 1, 2006 – Mar 18, 2006)
- (Albania) Alfred Ferko (Mar 19, 2006 – Jun 1, 2006)
- (Albania) Sulejman Starova (July 1, 2006 – June 30, 2007)
- (Albania) Hysen Dedja (July 1, 2007 – Sept 30, 2007)
- (Albania) Gentian Begeja (Oct 1, 2007 – Nov 27, 2007)
- (Albania) Kristaq Mile (Nov 28, 2007 – Jun 1, 2008)
- (Albania) Sulejman Starova (Aug 24, 2008 – May 30, 2009)
- (Albania) Mirel Josa (Jul 1, 2009 – Jan 31, 2010)
- (Albania) Ylli Shehu (Feb 4, 2010 – Jun 3, 2010)
- (Albania) Edi Martini (Jun 9, 2010 – May 24, 2011)
- (Albania) Hasan Lika (May 27, 2011 – Sep 3, 2012)
- (Albania) Gentian Begeja (Sep 14, 2012 – Jan 22, 2013)
- (Albania) Gugash Magani (Jan 28, 2013 – Nov 16, 2013)
- (Italy) Roberto Sorrentino (Nov 18, 2013 – Feb 24, 2014)
- (Albania) Ilir Biturku (Feb 25, 2014 – May 30, 2014)
- (Albania) Hasan Lika (Jun 5, 2014 – Nov 24, 2014)
- (Albania) Gentian Begeja (Nov 24, 2014 – May 2015)
- (Albania) Gugash Magani (Jun 2, 2015 – May 2016)
- (Albania) Julian Ahmataj (Jun 2016 – Jul 2016)
- (Albania) Hito Hitaj (Jul 2016 – Sep 2016)
- (Italy) Cesare Beggi (Sep 2016)
- (Italy) Roberto Cevoli (Oct 2016)
- (Albania) Gugash Magani (Oct 2016 – Dec 2017)
- (Albania) Stavri Nica (Dec 2017 – Feb 2018)
- (Albania) Gentian Begeja (Feb 2018 – May 2018)
- (Albania) Bledi Shkëmbi (Jun 2018 – Dec 2019)
- (Albania) Edi Martini (Dec 2019 – Nov 2021)
- (Albania) Renato Arapi (Nov 2021 – Dec 2021)
- (Albania) Edi Martini (Dec 2021 – Jan 2022)
- (Albania) Renato Arapi (Jan 2022 – Sep 2022)
- (Albania) Bledi Shkëmbi (Sep 2022 – Nov 2022)
- (Albania) Edi Martini (Nov 2022 – Jun 2023)
- (Italy) Diego Longo (Jun 2023 – Sep 2023)
- (Albania) Edi Martini (Sep 2023 – Jan 2025)
- (Albania) Bledar Devolli (Jan 2025 – Feb 2025)
- (Albania) Bledar Hodo (Feb 2025 – May 2025)
- (Albania) Enkeleid Dobi (Jul 2025 – May 2026)
- (Albania) Bledar Hodo (May 2026 – Jun 2026)
- (Albania) Edlir Tetova (Jun 2026 –)

=== Title winning managers ===
| Name | Period | Notes |
|---|---|---|
| (Albania) Haxhi Ballgjini | 1993–94 | 1993-94 Albanian Superliga |
| (Albania) Bashkim Koka | 1994–96 | 1994–95 Albanian Cup |
| (Albania) Hasan Lika | 1999–03 | 1999–2000 Albanian Cup |
| (Albania) Stavri Nica | 2005 | 2004–05 Albanian Cup |
| (Albania) Edi Martini | 2019–2021 | 2019–20 Albanian Cup, 2020 Albanian Supercup, 2020–21 Kategoria Superiore |
