= 2014–15 FK Partizani Tirana season =

Partizani Tirana
2014–15 season
- President: Gazmend Demi
- Head coach: Shpëtim Duro
- Stadium: Qemal Stafa Stadium
- Kategoria Superiore: 3rd
- Albanian Cup: Quarter-finals
- Top goalscorer: League: Stevan Račić (14); All: Stevan Račić (14)
- Highest home attendance: 11,800 vs Tirana (8 December 2014)
- Lowest home attendance: 100 vs Iliria Fushë-Krujë (23 September 2014)
Home colours	Away colours

In the 2014–15 season, Partizani Tirana competed in the Kategoria Superiore for the second consecutive season.

== Players ==
As of 1 June 2015

Note: Flags indicate national team as defined under FIFA eligibility rules; some limited exceptions apply. Players may hold more than one non-FIFA nationality.

No.	Pos.	Nation	Player
1	GK	ALB	Dashamir Xhika
4	DF	KOS	Arbnor Fejzullahu
5	DF	BUL	Ignat Dishliev
5	DF	ALB	Gëzim Krasniqi
6	DF	MKD	Ardian Cuculi
7	FW	ALB	Rigers Dushku
8	MF	KOS	Argjend Mustafa
9	FW	KOS	Astrit Fazliu
10	MF	ALB	Idriz Batha
11	MF	MKD	Nderim Nexhipi (captain)
12	GK	ALB	Alban Hoxha (vice-captain)
13	MF	KOS	Laurent Ismailaj
14	MF	KOS	Mentor Mazrekaj
17	FW	SRB	Stevan Račić

No.	Pos.	Nation	Player
18	DF	ALB	Amir Rrahmani
19	MF	ALB	Lorenc Trashi
20	MF	MKD	Bunjamin Shabani
21	MF	ALB	Asion Daja
22	DF	KOS	Labinot Ibrahimi
23	FW	SLO	Liridon Osmanaj
25	GK	ALB	Fabio Gjonikaj
27	DF	ALB	Klaudio Çema
30	FW	ALB	Jurgen Vatnikaj
44	DF	ALB	Endrit Vrapi
70	MF	ALB	Dorian Bylykbashi
77	MF	GRE	Arben Muskaj (on loan from PAS Giannina)
88	FW	ALB	Emiljano Vila

- Italics players who left the team during the season.
- Bold players who came in the team during the season.

== Transfers ==
=== In ===
Date	Pos.	Player	Age	Moving from	Fee	Notes	Source
23 May 2014	MF	(Albania) Idriz Batha	22	(Albania) Teuta Durrës	Free	Effective From 1 July	
26 May 2014	GK	(Albania) Dashamir Xhika	25	(Albania) Tërbuni Pukë	Free	Effective From 1 July	
30 May 2014	MF	(Albania) Argjend Mustafa	21	(Albania) Besa Kavajë	Free	Effective From 1 July	
31 May 2014	MF	(Albania) Lorenc Trashi	22	(Albania) Lushnja	Free	Effective From 1 July	
14 June 2014	MF	(North Macedonia) Bunjamin Shabani	23	(North Macedonia) FK Shkëndija	Free	Effective From 1 July	
16 June 2014	DF	(Bulgaria) Ignat Dishliev	27	(Bulgaria) Beroe	Free	Effective From 1 July	
30 June 2014	FW	(Serbia) Stevan Račić	30	(Serbia) Javor Ivanjica	Free		
1 July 2014	DF	(North Macedonia) Ardian Cuculi	26	(North Macedonia) FK Shkëndija	Free		
7 July 2014	DF	(Albania) Arbnor Fejzullahu	21	(Albania) Besa Kavajë	Free		
7 July 2014	FW	(Brazil) Rafael Magalhães	28	(Brazil) Grêmio Catanduvense	Free		
8 July 2014	MF	(Albania) Asion Daja	15	(Albania) Kastrioti Krujë	Free		

=== Out ===
Date	Pos.	Player	Age	Moving to	Fee	Notes	Source
6 April 2014	FW	(North Macedonia) Ersen Sali	26	Free Agent	N/A		
30 April 2014	MF	(Albania) Renato Hyshmeri	25	Free Agent	N/A		
8 May 2014	FW	(Albania) Migen Memelli	34	Free Agent	N/A		
10 May 2014	MF	(Albania) Emiljano Musta	22	Free Agent	N/A		
12 May 2014	DF	(Kosovo) Liridon Ahmeti	28	Free Agent	N/A		
12 May 2014	FW	(Croatia) Mario Sačer	24	Free Agent	N/A		
12 May 2014	MF	(Croatia) Antun Dunković	32	Free Agent	N/A		
12 May 2014	FW	(Bosnia and Herzegovina) Almir Pliska	26	Free Agent	N/A		
31 May 2014	MF	(Albania) Sulejman Hoxha	24	Free Agent	N/A		
3 June 2014	DF	(North Macedonia) Ertan Demiri	35	Free Agent	N/A		
3 June 2014	MF	(Kosovo) Behar Maliqi	28	Free Agent	N/A		
5 June 2014	DF	(Albania) Elvis Prençi	20	(Albania) Teuta Durrës	Free		
10 June 2014	MF	(Albania) Fatmir Hysenbelliu	22	Free Agent	N/A		
10 June 2014	DF	(Albania) Gazmend Krasniqi	24	Free Agent	N/A		
17 June 2014	MF	(Albania) Mikelanxhelo Bardhi	19	(Albania) Dinamo Tirana	Loan		
19 June 2014	DF	(Albania) Mevlan Murati	20	(North Macedonia) FK Shkëndija	Free		
25 June 2014	DF	(Nigeria) Felix Udoh	20	Free Agent	N/A		
27 June 2014	MF	(Nigeria) Oshobe Oladele	20	Free Agent	N/A		
5 July 2014	MF	(Serbia) Dragan Antanasijević	26	Free Agent	N/A		
13 August 2014	DF	(Kosovo) Besnik Krasniqi	24	Free Agent	N/A		
16 August 2014	FW	(Brazil) Rafael Magalhães	28	(Albania) Teuta Durrës	Free		

== Pre-season and friendlies ==
16 July 2014 Friendly	KF Vëllazërimi (North Macedonia)	1–0	(Albania) Partizani Tirana	Kičevo, Macedonia
17:30 CET	Sefa 20'			Stadium: City Stadium Kičevo

24 July 2014 Friendly	Partizani Tirana (Albania)	1–1	(North Macedonia) FK Gostivar	Mavrovo, Macedonia
17:00 CET	Magalhães 38'	Report	Xhaferri 42'

1 August 2014 Friendly	Partizani Tirana (Albania)	2–0	(Greece) Panserraikos	Bansko, Bulgaria
18:00 CET	Magalhães 15'; Vatnikaj 85'	Report

5 August 2014 Friendly	Partizani Tirana (Albania)	8–0	(Bulgaria) FC Pirin	Bansko, Bulgaria
17:00 CET	Trashi; Shabani; Vatnikaj; Račić; Mazrekaj; Dishliev	Report

16 August 2014 Friendly	Partizani Tirana (Albania)	4–1	(Albania) KF Elbasani	Kamëz, Albania
17:30 CET	Mazrekaj 7'; Cuculi 12'; Batha 50'; Vatnikaj 87'	report	Dalipi 27'	Stadium: Kamëz Stadium; Attendance: 400; Referee: Olsi Sokoli

20 August 2014 Friendly	Kamza (Albania)	0–3	(Albania) Partizani Tirana	Kamëz, Albania
17:00 CET		Report	Mazrekaj 68'; Fazliu 75' (pen.); Mustafa 88'	Stadium: Kamëz Stadium; Attendance: 600; Referee: Besnik Kaimi

3 August 2014 Friendly	Besa Kavajë (Albania)	1–2	(Albania) Partizani Tirana	Kavajë, Albania
17:00 CET	Nuri 88'	Report	Mustafa 45'; Osmanaj 50'	Stadium: Besa Stadium; Referee: Xhenald Rada

== Competitions ==
=== Kategoria Superiore ===
==== League table ====
Pos	Team	Pld	W	D	L	GF	GA	GD	Pts	Qualification or relegation
1	Skënderbeu (C)	36	24	7	5	58	18	+40	79	Qualification for the Champions League second qualifying round
2	Kukësi	36	23	6	7	59	27	+32	75	Qualification for the Europa League first qualifying round
3	Partizani	36	22	7	7	42	24	+18	73	Qualification for the Europa League first qualifying round
4	Tirana	36	21	8	7	47	27	+20	71	
5	Laçi	36	20	9	7	46	19	+27	69	Qualification for the Europa League first qualifying round (Note: Laçi qualified for the UEFA Europa League first qualifying round by winning the 2014–15 Albanian Cup.)

Source: Albanian Football Association (in Albanian), Soccerway
Rules for classification: 1) points; 2) points in head-to-head matches; 3) goal difference in head-to-head matches; 4) goals scored in head-to-head matches; 5) total goal difference; 6) total goals scored; 7) draw
(C) Champions

==== Results summary ====
Overall								Home						Away					
Pld	W	D	L	GF	GA	GD	Pts	W	D	L	GF	GA	GD	W	D	L	GF	GA	GD
36	22	7	7	42	24	+18	73	13	4	1	25	7	+18	9	3	6	17	17	0

Source: Competitive matches

==== Results by round ====
Round	1	2	3	4	5	6	7	8	9	10	11	12	13	14	15	16	17	18	19	20	21	22	23	24	25	26	27	28	29	30	31	32	33	34	35	36
Ground	A	A	H	A	H	A	H	A	H	H	H	A	H	A	H	A	H	A	A	A	H	A	H	A	H	A	H	H	H	A	H	A	H	A	H	A
Result	D	L	W	W	W	D	D	W	W	W	W	L	W	W	W	L	L	W	D	W	D	L	W	W	W	L	W	W	W	L	D	W	D	W	W	W
Position	6	7	6	4	4	3	3	2	2	2	1	4	3	1	1	1	3	3	4	4	4	4	4	4	4	4	4	4	4	4	4	4	4	4	3	3

Source: Competitive matches
A = Away; H = Home; W = Win; D = Draw; L = Loss

==== Matches ====
24 August 2014 1	Laçi	1–1	Partizani Tirana	Laç
17:00 CEST	Veliaj (yellow card) 43'; Doku 55'; Teqja (yellow card) 85'	Report	Račić 47'; Cuculi (yellow card) 52'; Batha (yellow card) 71'; Mazrekaj (yellow card) 89'	Stadium: Laçi Stadium; Attendance: 1,200; Referee: Laver Alla

29 August 2014 2	Apolonia Fier	1–0	Partizani Tirana	Fier
18:00 CEST	Gërxho (yellow card) 31'; Atanda (yellow card) 66'; Canka 80'; Xhafa (yellow card) 87'; Mitraj (yellow card) 90+4'	Report	Dishliev (yellow card) 29' (yellow-red card) 61'; Batha (yellow card) 34'	Stadium: Loni Papuçiu Stadium; Attendance: 2,400; Referee: Remzi Sadiku

11 September 2014 3	Partizani Tirana	1–0	Skënderbeu Korçë	Tirana
18:00 CEST	Vila 90' (pen.)	Report	Marconi (yellow card) 55' (yellow-red card) 86'; Progni (yellow card) 64'; Lilaj (yellow card) 67'; Arapi (yellow card) 72'; Radaš (yellow card) 86'	Stadium: Qemal Stafa Stadium; Attendance: 6,500; Referee: Enea Jorgji

13 September 2014 4	Kukësi	0–1	Partizani Tirana	Kukës
12:00 CEST	Dosti (yellow card) 17'; Smajli (yellow card) 45'; Lushtaku (yellow card) 60'; Dushku (yellow card) 62'; Malota (yellow card) 86'	Report	Fejzullahu (yellow card) 27'; Fazliu (yellow card) 42'; Račić (yellow card) 45' (goal) 87'; Hoxha (yellow card) 90+3'	Stadium: Zeqir Ymeri Stadium; Attendance: 2,500; Referee: Lorenc Jemini

19 September 2014 5	Partizani Tirana	2–0	Teuta Durrës	Tirana
18:00 CEST	Račić 40'; Fazliu 42'; Trashi (yellow card) 65'	Report	Hoxha (yellow card) 82'	Stadium: Qemal Stafa Stadium; Attendance: 3,000; Referee: Remzi Sadiku

26 September 2014 6	Tirana	0–0	Partizani Tirana	Tirana
19:00 CEST	Bulku (yellow card) 37'; Kalari (yellow card) 69'; Muça (yellow card) 75'; Curri (yellow card) 90+2'	Report	Batha (yellow card) 59'; Vrapi (yellow card) 69'	Stadium: Qemal Stafa Stadium; Attendance: 0 (Note: The match was played behind the doors closed.); Referee: Bardhyl Pashaj

4 October 2014 7	Partizani Tirana	0–0	Flamurtari Vlorë	Tirana
16:00 CEST	Cululi (yellow card) 24'; Trashi (yellow card) 27'	Report	Arbëri (yellow card) 20'; Gilberto (yellow card) 27'; Mici (yellow card) 41'; Telushi (yellow card) 70'	Stadium: Qemal Stafa Stadium; Attendance: 3,000; Referee: Andi Koçi

19 October 2014 8	Vllaznia Shkodër	0–1	Partizani Tirana	Shkodër
12:00 CEST	Shala (yellow card) 37'; Aguirre (yellow card) 58'	Report	Hoxha (yellow card) 12'; Mazrekaj 20' (yellow card) 90+3'; Fejzullahu (yellow card) 34'	Stadium: Loro Boriçi Stadium; Attendance: 2,500; Referee: Lorenc Jemini

26 October 2014 9	Partizani Tirana	1–0	Elbasani	Tirana
17:00 CET	Vila (penalty missed) 236'; Račić 42'; Batha (yellow card) 63'	Report	Toçi (yellow card) 26'; Kaçuli (yellow card) 34'; Gava (yellow card) 66'; Shazivari (yellow card) 90'	Stadium: Qemal Stafa Stadium; Attendance: 3,000; Referee: Laver Alla

29 October 2014 10	Partizani Tirana	2–0	Laçi	Tirana
17:00 CET	Vila 46' (yellow card) 68'; Mazrekaj 53' (pen.); Vrapi (yellow card) 79'; Cuculi (yellow card) 81'	Report	Çela (yellow card) 17'; Doku (yellow card) 26'; Sefa (yellow card) 28'; Vujadinović (yellow card) 52'	Stadium: Qemal Stafa Stadium; Attendance: 2,500; Referee: Emirjon Sino

2 November 2014 11	Partizani Tirana	1–0	Apolonia Fier	Tirana
16:00 CET	Rrahmani (yellow card) 32'; Mazrekaj 49'; Trashi (yellow card) 55'; Daja (yellow card) 83'	Report	Broshka (yellow card) 22' (yellow-red card) 43'	Stadium: Qemal Stafa Stadium; Attendance: 3,000; Referee: Remzi Sadiku

8 November 2014 12	Skënderbeu Korçë	3–0	Partizani Tirana	Korçë
17:00 CET	Dhiego Martins 29', 72'; Lilaj (yellow card) 88'; Sefa 90'	Report	Xhika (red card) 25'; Račić (yellow card) 35'; Rrahmani (yellow card) 68'; Daja (yellow card) 71'; Fejzullahu (red card) 82'	Stadium: Skënderbeu Stadium; Attendance: 5,000; Referee: Laver Alla

23 November 2014 13	Partizani Tirana	2–0	Kukësi	Tirana
17:00 CET	Ibrahimi 16'; Račić (yellow card) 26'; Nexhipi 34' (yellow card) 35'	Report	Zeqiri (yellow card) 19'; Musolli (yellow card) 66'	Stadium: Qemal Stafa Stadium; Attendance: 4,000; Referee: Lorenc Jemini

30 November 2014 14	Teuta Durrës	0–1	Partizani Tirana	Durrës
17:00 CET	Hoxhallari (yellow card) 18'; Deliallisi (yellow card) 33'; Hodo (yellow card) 39'	Report	Vrapi (yellow card) 38'; Osmanaj 70'	Stadium: Niko Dovana Stadium; Attendance: 2,500; Referee: Blerim Ziri

8 December 2014 15	Partizani Tirana	2–0	Tirana	Tirana
18:00 CET	Nexhipi 1'; Mazrekaj 12' (pen.); Račić (yellow card) 42'; Cuculi (yellow card) 81'; Batha (yellow card) 87'	Report	Muça (yellow card) 17'; Ndikumana (yellow card) 25'; Kërçiku (yellow card) 73'	Stadium: Qemal Stafa Stadium; Attendance: 11,800; Referee: Kridens Meta

13 December 2014 16	Flamurtari Vlorë	1–0	Partizani Tirana	Vlorë
16:00 CET	Shehaj 85' (yellow card) 87'	Report	Cuculi (yellow card) 44'; Račić (yellow card) 87'	Stadium: Flamurtari Stadium; Attendance: 4,000; Referee: Andi Koçi

17 December 2014 17	Partizani Tirana	0–1	Vllaznia Shkodër	Tirana
16:00 CET	Batha (yellow card) 40'; Osmanaj (yellow card) 64'; Cuculi (yellow card) 83'	Report	Boçi (yellow card) 25'; Krymi (yellow card) 28'; Tafili 35' (yellow card) 40'; Shtubina (yellow card) 86'	Stadium: Qemal Stafa Stadium; Attendance: 2,500; Referee: Lorenc Jemini

20 December 2014 18	Elbasani	0–1	Partizani Tirana	Elbasan
16:00 CET		Report	Račić 1'; Asion Daja (yellow card) 37'; Trashi (yellow card) 79'	Stadium: Elbasan Arena; Attendance: 0 (Note: The match was played behind the doors closed.); Referee: Laver Alla

25 January 2015 19	Laçi	1–1	Partizani Tirana	Laç
14:00 CET	Çela (yellow card) 5'; Ćetković 10'; Veliaj (yellow card) 26'; Nimani (yellow card) 68'	Report	Vrapi (yellow card) 7'; Bylykbashi 57'; Hoxha (yellow card) 80'	Stadium: Laçi Stadium; Attendance: 1,500; Referee: Enea Jorgji

31 January 2015 20	Apolonia Fier	0–2	Partizani Tirana	Fier
17:00 CET	Kaja (yellow card) 32'; Nako (yellow card) 35'; Atanda (yellow card) 85'	Report	Vila (yellow card) 5'; Rrahmani 12'	Stadium: Loni Papuçiu Stadium; Attendance: 1,300; Referee: Enea Jorgji

9 February 2015 21	Partizani Tirana	0–0	Skënderbeu Korçë	Durrës (Note: The match was held at Niko Dovana Stadium due to reconstruction of the field of Qemal Stafa Stadium.)
18:00 CET	Račić (yellow card) 7'; Mazrekaj (yellow card) 32'; Vrapi (yellow card) 69'; Cuculi (yellow card) 81'	Report	Bersiha (yellow card) 28'; Progni (yellow card) 34'; Nimaga (yellow card) 35'	Stadium: Niko Dovana Stadium; Attendance: 1,500; Referee: Kridens Meta

14 February 2015 22	Kukësi	3–0	Partizani Tirana	Kukës
14:00 CET	Pejić 13'; Zeqiri 39'; Malota (yellow card) 59'; Shameti 63'	Report	Batha (red card) 41'	Stadium: Zeqir Ymeri Stadium; Attendance: 5,000; Referee: Lorenc Jemini

22 February 2015 23	Partizani Tirana	2–1	Teuta Durrës	Fier (Note: The match was held at Loni Papuçiu Stadium due to reconstruction of the field of Qemal Stafa Stadium.)
14:00 CET	Fazliu 10' (yellow card) 90+2'; Mazrekaj 18' (pen.)	Report	Prençi (yellow card) 17'; Nika 41' (pen.); Çota (yellow card) 46'; Brahja (yellow card) 87'	Stadium: Loni Papuçiu Stadium; Attendance: 150; Referee: Kridens Meta

13 March 2015 (Note: The match was originally scheduled to be played in February, but it was delayed due to reconstruction of the field of Qemal Stafa Stadium.) 24	Tirana	1–2	Partizani Tirana	Tirana
19:00 CET	Morina 61' (yellow card) 62'; Muça (yellow card) 88'	Report	Nexhipi 25' (yellow card) 76'; Račić 32'; Ibrahimi (yellow card) 40'	Stadium: Qemal Stafa Stadium; Attendance: 12,000; Referee: Bardhyl Pashaj

4 March 2015 25	Partizani Tirana	2–1	Flamurtari Vlorë	Durrës (Note: The match was held at Niko Dovana Stadium due to reconstruction of the field of Qemal Stafa Stadium.)
14:00 CET	Rrahmani 57'; Batha (yellow card) 78'; Račić 78'	Report	Telushi 21' (yellow card) 56'; Hodža (yellow card) 55'; Arbëri (red card) 79'	Stadium: Niko Dovana Stadium; Attendance: 800; Referee: Laver Alla

8 March 2015 26	Vllaznia Shkodër	1–0	Partizani Tirana	Shkodër
17:00 CET	Pjeshka (yellow card) 22'; Hakaj (yellow card) 54'; Beqiri (yellow card) 83'; Çinari 90'	Report	Rrahmani (yellow card) 87'	Stadium: Loro Boriçi Stadium; Attendance: 2,000; Referee: Remzi Sadiku

16 March 2015 27	Partizani Tirana	4–1	Elbasani	Tirana
18:00 CET	Nexhipi (yellow card) 32'; Vila 49'; Račić 50', 78'; Rrahmani 90'	Report	Malindi 28' (yellow card) 70'; Hila (yellow card) 32'; Kaçuli (yellow card) 33'; Dosti (yellow card) 36'; Gava (yellow card) 70'	Stadium: Qemal Stafa Stadium; Attendance: 3,000; Referee: Eldorjan Hamiti

22 March 2015 28	Partizani Tirana	1–0	Laçi	Tirana
17:00 CET	Račić (yellow card) 34' (goal) 68'; Cuculi (yellow card) 62'; Fejzullahu (yellow card) 76'	Report	Ndreca (yellow card) 75'	Stadium: Qemal Stafa Stadium; Attendance: 800; Referee: Remzi Sadiku

4 April 2015 29	Partizani Tirana	1–0	Apolonia Fier	Tirana
16:00 CEST	Nexhipi (yellow card) 20'; Batha (yellow card) 44'; Vrapi (yellow card) 46'; Račić 71'	Report	Nako (yellow card) 35'; Miço (yellow card) 64'	Stadium: Qemal Stafa Stadium; Attendance: 1,500; Referee: Andi Koçi

13 April 2015 30	Skënderbeu Korçë	5–2	Partizani Tirana	Korçë
17:00 CEST	Lilaj 12' (yellow card) 17'; Latifi 38'; Berisha 46' (yellow card) 46'; Stojkov 53' (yellow card) 54'; Radaš (yellow card) 60' (goal) 65'; Arapi (yellow card) 75'	Report	Fejzullahu (yellow card) 13'; Račić 45', 58'; Vila (yellow card) 77' (yellow-red card) 89'; Trashi (yellow card) 83'	Stadium: Skënderbeu Stadium; Attendance: 6,500; Referee: Enea Jorgji

18 April 2015 31	Partizani Tirana	1–1	Kukësi	Tirana
16:00 CEST	Račić (yellow card) 6' (goal) 25'; Cuculi (yellow card) 54' (yellow-red card) 74'	Report	Lushtaku (yellow card) 60'; Pejić 74' (pen.); Jefferson (yellow card) 77'	Stadium: Qemal Stafa Stadium; Attendance: 4,500; Referee: Lorenc Jemini

25 April 2015 32	Teuta Durrës	0–1	Partizani Tirana	Durrës
16:00 CEST	Kastrati (yellow card) 15'; Kotobelli (yellow card) 82'; Hoxhallari (yellow card) 87'	Report	Nexhipi (yellow card) 33'; Batha 53'	Stadium: Niko Dovana Stadium; Attendance: 600; Referee: Blerim Ziri

4 May 2015 33	Partizani Tirana	2–2	Tirana	Tirana
19:45 CEST	Batha (yellow card) 30'; Fazliu 55' (yellow card) 56'; Mazrekaj 82'	Report	El. Bakaj 34', 83'; Karabeci (yellow card) 58'; Kahata (yellow card) 70'; Muça (yellow card) 85'; Ed. Bakaj (yellow card) 90+5'	Stadium: Qemal Stafa Stadium; Attendance: 11,100; Referee: Lorenc Jemini

9 May 2015 34	Flamurtari Vlorë	0–1	Partizani Tirana	Vlorë
15:00 CEST	Xhelilaj (yellow card) 23'; Maxhuni (yellow card) 27' (yellow-red card) 84'; Gjinaj (yellow card) 67'; Lena (yellow card) 90+2'	Report	Mazrekaj 24' (pen.); Bylykbashi (yellow card) 68'	Stadium: Flamurtari Stadium; Attendance: 600; Referee: Kridens Meta

17 May 2015 35	Partizani Tirana	1–0	Vllaznia Shkodër	Tirana
16:00 CET	Mazrekaj 24' (pen.); Račić (yellow card) 34'; Trashi (yellow card) 45'; Daja (yellow card) 64'; Batha (yellow card) 65'; Cuculi (yellow card) 90+3'	Report	Sherri (yellow card) 24'; Gurishta (yellow card) 45'	Stadium: Qemal Stafa Stadium; Attendance: 1,700; Referee: Andi Koçi

22 May 2015 36	Elbasani	0–3	Partizani Tirana	Kamëz (Note: The match was held at Kamëz Stadium due to reconstruction of Elbasan Arena.)
16:00 CEST		Report	Krasniqi 28'; Bylykbashi 57'; Fazliu 66'	Stadium: Kamëz Stadium; Attendance: 500; Referee: Erald Demiraj

=== Albanian Cup ===
==== First round ====
16 September 2014 First leg	Iliria Fushë-Krujë	0–3	Partizani Tirana	Fushë-Krujë
14:30 CET	Gjonaj (yellow card) 30'	Report	Muskaj 57'; Mustafa 60'; Račić (yellow card) 68'; Osmanaj (yellow card) 81' (yellow-red card) 90+1' (goal) 87'	Stadium: Fushë-Krujë Stadium; Attendance: 300; Referee: Hermal Llapra

23 September 2014 Second leg	Partizani Tirana	2–1 (5–1 agg.)	Iliria Fushë-Krujë	Pezë Helmës
14:00 CET	Fazliu 15'; Trashi 37' (pen.); Dushku (red card) 90+2'	Report	Pasha 16'; Balliu (yellow card) 18' (yellow-red card) 80'; Ajazi (yellow card) 20'; Vathi (red card) 37'; Kurti (yellow card) 53'; Bërdufi (yellow card) 60'	Stadium: Internacional Complex; Attendance: 100; Referee: Remzi Sadiku

==== Second round ====
5 November 2014 First leg	Lushnja	0–1	Partizani Tirana	Lushnjë
14:00 CET	Taullau (yellow card) 11'; Çela (yellow card) 66'	Report	Cuculi 78'	Stadium: Abdurrahman Roza Haxhiu Stadium; Attendance: 300; Referee: Emirjon Sino

19 November 2014 Second leg	Partizani Tirana	4–1 (5–1 agg.)	Lushnja	Pezë Helmës
13:30 CET	Dishliev (yellow card) 16'; Fejzullahu 25'; Dushku 44'; Jaupaj 80'; Batha 90+2' (pen.)	Report	Gjyla 16' (pen.); Musaku (yellow card) 85'; Sula (yellow card) 90+1'	Stadium: Internacional Complex; Attendance: 100; Referee: Hermal Llapra

==== Quarter-finals ====
4 February 2015 First leg	Partizani Tirana	2–0	Laçi	Fushë-Krujë (Note: The match was held at Redi Maloku Stadium due to reconstruction of the field of Qemal Stafa Stadium.)
14:00 CET	Fazliu 9'; Bylykbashi 17'; Batha (yellow card) 67'	Report	Sefgjinaj (yellow card) 47'; Çela (yellow card) 72'; Doku (yellow card) 79'; Veliaj (yellow card) 79'; Zefi (yellow card) 79'	Stadium: Redi Maloku Stadium; Attendance: 500; Referee: Remzi Sadiku

18 February 2015 Second leg	Laçi	3–0 (a.e.t.) (2–3 agg.)	Partizani Tirana	Laç
14:00 CET	Adeniyi 56'; Meto 79'; Mitraj (yellow card) 108'; Ćetković 119'	Report	Muskaj (yellow card) 53' (yellow-red card) 55'	Stadium: Laçi Stadium; Attendance: 100; Referee: Laver Alla
