= 2014–15 Albanian Cup =

Kupa e Shqipërisë

Tournament details
- Country: Albania
- Teams: 36

Final positions
- Champions: Laçi
- Runners-up: Kukësi

Tournament statistics
- Matches played: 56
- Goals scored: 161 (2.88 per match)
- Top goal scorer(s): James Adeniyi; Ardit Shehaj; Ivan Perić (5 goals each)

2014–15 Albanian Cup (Albanian: Kupa e Shqipërisë) was the sixty-three season of Albania's annual cup competition. Flamurtari were the most recent winners of the competition, that being their fourth first Cup trophy.

Ties are played in a two-legged format similar to those of European competitions. If the aggregate score is tied after both games, the team with the higher number of away goals advances. If the number of away goals is equal in both games, the match is decided by extra time and a penalty shoot-out, if necessary.

== Preliminary round ==
In order to reduce the number of participating teams for the first round to 32, a preliminary tournament is played. In contrast to the main tournament, the preliminary tournament is held as a single-leg knock-out competition. Matches were played on 29 August 2014 and involved the teams from Kategoria e Parë and Kategoria e Dytë.

Team 1	Score	Team 2
Himara (III)	3–1	Bilisht Sport (III)
Albpetrol (III)	0–1	Vora (III)

== First round ==
All 28 teams of the 2014–15 Superiore and Kategoria e Parë entered in this round along with the two qualifiers from the preliminary round. The first legs were played on 1 October 2014 and the second legs took place on 22 October 2014.

Team 1	Agg.	Team 2	1st leg	2nd leg
Vora (III)	2–10	Kukësi (I)	1−4	1−6
Veleçiku (II)	2−2 (a)	Besa (II)	0−0	2−2
Burreli (II)	0−2	Lushnja (II)	0−1	0−1
Shkumbini (II)	3−3	Elbasani (I)	2−2	1−1
Kamza (II)	0−5	Flamurtari (I)	0−0	0–5
Iliria (II)	1−6	Partizani (I)	0−3	1–2
Himara (III)	1−20	Skënderbeu (I)	1−10	0−10
Naftëtari (II)	1−5	Laçi (I)	0−2	1−3
Dinamo Tirana (II)	0−8	Apolonia (I)	0−4	0−4
Ada (II)	2−3	Kastrioti (II)	1−1	1−2
Adriatiku (II)	2−3	Vllaznia (I)	0−2	2−1
Besëlidhja (II)	2−5	Teuta (I)	0−2	2−3
Sopoti (II)	1−4	Tirana (I)	0−3	1−1
Pogradeci (II)	2−0	Butrinti (II)	2−0	0−0
Tomori (II)	2−3	Tërbuni (II)	1−2	1−1
Luftëtari (II)	3−4	Bylis (II)	2−1	1−3

1 October 2014	Vora	1–4	Kukësi	Fusha Sportive Vorë, Vorë
15:15 CEST	Bleta 27'	Report	Allmuça 47'; Pejić 55'; Lushtaku 65'; Hysa 85'	Attendance: 300; Referee: Albano Stolaj

22 October 2014	Kukësi	6–1	Vora	Kompleksi Sportiv Dinamo, Tirana
14:00 CEST	Perić 14', 17', 50', 75'; Dosti 34'; Shameti 62'	Report	Bleta 52'	Attendance: 50; Referee: Klodjan Prenga

Kukësi advanced to the second round.

1 October 2014	Veleçiku	0–0	Besa	Kompleksi Vellezërit Duli, Koplik
14:30 CET		Report		Attendance: 150; Referee: Besnard Kaimi

22 October 2014	Besa	2–2	Veleçiku	Besa Stadium, Kavajë
14:00 CEST	Kuli 3', 90' (pen.)	Report	O. Pepaj 13'; Djepaxhia 60'	Attendance: 100; Referee: Skerdi Greca

Veleçiku advanced to the second round.

1 October 2014	Burreli	0–1	Lushnja	Liri Ballabani Stadium, Burrel
14:30 CEST		Report	Allkanjari 58'	Attendance: 150; Referee: Indrit Myrtja

22 October 2014	Lushnja	1–0	Burreli	Abdurrahman Roza Haxhiu Stadium, Lushnjë
14:30 CEST	Shkoza 51'	Report		Attendance: 400; Referee: Edvaldo Durmishi

Lushnja advanced to the second round.

1 October 2014	Shkumbini	2–2	Elbasani	Shkumbini Stadium, Peqin
14:30 CEST	Kuçi 30', 36'	Report	Dalipi 33'; Lamçja 41'	Attendance: 10; Referee: Edvaldo Durmishi

22 October 2014	Elbasani	1–1	Shkumbini	Stadiumi Nexhip Trungu, Cërrik
14:00 CEST	Dosti 33'	Report	Dosti 80' (o.g.)	Attendance: 150; Referee: Amarildo Gjeci

Elbasani advanced to the second round.

1 October 2014	Kamza	0–0	Flamurtari	Kamëz Stadium, Kamëz
14:30 CEST		Report		Attendance: 100; Referee: Klodian Shahini

22 October 2014	Flamurtari	5–0	Kamza	Flamurtari Stadium, Vlorë
14:00 CEST	Begaj 24'; Shehaj 27', 45+1', 69'; Bregu 72'	Report		Attendance: 500; Referee: Olsion Yzeiraj

Flamurtari advanced to the second round.

1 October 2014	Iliria	0–3	Partizani	Redi Maloku Stadium, Fushë-Krujë
14:30 CEST		Report	Muskaj 57'; Mustafa 60'; Osmanaj 87'	Attendance: 300; Referee: Hermal Llapra

22 October 2014	Partizani	2–1	Iliria	Internacional Tirana Stadium, Pezë e Vogël
14:00 CEST	Fazliu 15'; Trashi 37' (pen.)	Report	Pasha 16'	Attendance: 100; Referee: Remzi Sadiku

Partizani advanced to the second round.

1 October 2014	Himara	1–10	Skënderbeu	Besa Stadium, Kavajë
14:30 CEST	Kaçanaj 79' (pen.)	Report	Abazi 2', 48'; Lulaj 10'; Berisha 20'; Kame 31'; Martins 52'; Olayinka 54', 58'; Ribaj 70', 84'	Attendance: 200; Referee: Elidon Halo

22 October 2014	Skënderbeu	10–0	Himara	Fusha Sportive e Kompleksit Tropikal, Durrës
14:00 CEST	Sefa 2'; Martins 29', 33', 34'; Jashanica 36'; Ribaj 47'; Berisha 62'; Nimaga 71'; Lulaj 79'; Lilaj 81'	Report		Attendance: 50; Referee: Erald Demiraj

Skënderbeu advanced to the second round.

1 October 2014	Naftëtari	0–2	Laçi	Bashkim Sulejmani Stadium, Kuçovë
14:30 CEST		Report	Adeniyi 6'; Sefa 79' (pen.)	Attendance: 300; Referee: Armando Kamberaj

22 October 2014	Laçi	3–1	Naftëtari	Laçi Stadium, Laç
14:00 CEST	Sefa 9'; Adeniyi 14' (pen.); Sefgjinaj 51'	Report	Hima 36' (pen.)	Attendance: 150; Referee: Indrit Myrtja

Laçi advanced to the second round.

1 October 2014	Dinamo Tirana	0–4	Apolonia	Kompleksi Sportiv Dinamo, Tirana
14:30 CEST		Report	Mitraj 21'; Erkoceviç 38'; Rajković 39', 53'	Attendance: 200; Referee: Eldorjan Hamiti

22 October 2014	Apolonia	4–0	Dinamo Tirana	Loni Papuçiu Stadium, Fier
14:00 CEST	Rajković 8', 90+1'; Canka 16'; Al. Prifti 39'	Report		Attendance: 50; Referee: Hermal Llapra

Apolonia advanced to the second round.

1 October 2014	Ada	1–1	Kastrioti	Kastrioti Stadium, Krujë
14:30 CEST	Hoxha 36'	Report	Caca 74' (pen.)	Attendance: 100; Referee: Klodjan Prenga

22 October 2014	Kastrioti	2–1	Ada	Kastrioti Stadium, Krujë
14:00 CEST	Rroshi 78'; Zela 86'	Report	Hoxha 39'	Attendance: 100; Referee: Klodian Shahini

Kastrioti advanced to the second round.

1 October 2014	Adriatiku	0–2	Vllaznia	Mamurras Stadium, Mamurras
14:30 CEST		Report	Cioffi 3'; Tusha 89' (o.g.)	Attendance: 100; Referee: Ardian Beqiri

22 October 2014	Vllaznia	1–2	Adriatiku	Loro Boriçi Stadium, Shkodër
14:00 CEST	Dema 50'	Report	Fonseca 22'; Mihani 89'	Referee: Eldorjan Hamiti

Vllaznia advanced to the second round.

1 October 2014	Besëlidhja	0–2	Teuta	Brian Filipi Stadium, Lezhë
14:30 CEST		Report	Hoxhallari 26'; Dibra 29' (o.g.)	Attendance: 250; Referee: Blerim Ziri

22 October 2014	Teuta	3–2	Besëlidhja	Niko Dovana Stadium, Durrës
14:00 CEST	Nika 6' (pen.); Fall 28'; Gruda 34' (o.g.)	Report	Muçollari 3'; Malo 42' (pen.)	Attendance: 200; Referee: Blendi Breshani

Teuta advanced to the second round.

1 October 2014	Sopoti	0–3	Tirana	Stadiumi Nexhip Trungu, Cërrik
14:30 CEST		Report	Bušić 31', 81'; Halili 90+1'	Attendance: 350; Referee: Olsi Sokoli

22 October 2014	Tirana	1–1	Sopoti	Selman Stërmasi Stadium, Tirana
14:00 CEST	El. Bakaj 65'	Report	Bajrami 14'	Referee: Orlando Kuka

Tirana advanced to the second round.

1 October 2014	Pogradeci	2–0	Butrinti	Gjorgji Kyçyku Stadium, Pogradec
14:00 CEST	Laçka 9' (pen.), 66'	Report		Attendance: 250; Referee: Fatjon Xhemalaj

22 October 2014	Butrinti	0–0	Pogradeci	Stadiumi Andon Lapa, Sarandë
14:00 CEST		Report		Attendance: 200; Referee: Elidon Halo

Pogradeci advanced to the second round.

1 October 2014	Tomori	1–2	Tërbuni	Tomori Stadium, Berat
14:30 CEST	Arbri 7'	Report	Agastra 66'; Greca 90+2'	Attendance: 500; Referee: Kreshnik Cjapi

22 October 2014	Tërbuni	1–1	Tomori	Ismail Xhemali Stadium, Pukë
14:00 CEST	T. Marku 88'	Report	Shinko 52'	Attendance: 250; Referee: Besnard Kaimi

Tërbuni advanced to the second round.

1 October 2014	Luftëtari	2–1	Bylis	Gjirokastër Stadium, Gjirokastër
14:30 CEST	Qejvani 61'; Nelaj 85'	Report	Dervishi 50'	Attendance: 700; Referee: Skerdi Greca

22 October 2014	Bylis	3–1	Luftëtari	Adush Muça Stadium, Ballsh
14:00 CEST	Çunaj 19' (o.g.); Dervishi 24'; Mustafaraj 90'	Report	Zhupa 90+3'	Attendance: 200; Referee: Alvi Paço

Bylis advanced to the second round.

== Second round ==
All 16 qualified teams from First round progressed to the second round. The first legs were played on 5 November 2014 and the second legs took place on 19 November 2014.

Team 1	Agg.	Team 2	1st leg	2nd leg
Veleçiku (II)	1−9	Flamurtari (I)	1−6	0−3
Tërbuni (II)	1−6	Skënderbeu (I)	0−0	1−6
Elbasani (I)	2−5	Laçi (I)	2−3	0−2
Lushnja (II)	1−5	Partizani (I)	0−1	1−4
Bylis (II)	0−7	Tirana (I)	0−1	0−6
Kastrioti (II)	0−4	Vllaznia (I)	0−4	0−0
Pogradeci (II)	2−7	Kukësi (I)	0−2	2−5
Apolonia (I)	2−1	Teuta (I)	2−1	0−0

5 November 2014	Veleçiku	1–6	Flamurtari	Flamurtari Stadium, Vlorë
14:00 CET	Hepaj 73'	Report	Bregu 20', 58' (pen.); Shehaj 48', 52'; Meto 65'; Llambi 69'	Attendance: 250; Referee: Besnard Kaimi

19 November 2014	Flamurtari	3–0; Awarded	Veleçiku	Flamurtari Stadium, Vlorë
13:30 CET		Report

Flamurtari advanced to the quarter finals.

5 November 2014	Tërbuni	0–0	Skënderbeu	Ismail Xhemali Stadium, Pukë
14:00 CET		Report		Attendance: 250; Referee: Indrit Myrtja

20 November 2014	Skënderbeu	6–1	Tërbuni	Skënderbeu Stadium, Korçë
13:30 CET	Progni 3'; Ribaj 26'; Shkëmbi 67' (pen.); Sefa 72'; Alikaj 83'; Olayinka 85'	Report	Greca 2'	Attendance: 300; Referee: Erald Demiraj

Skënderbeu advanced to the quarter finals.

5 November 2014	Elbasani	2–3	Laçi	Elbasan Arena, Elbasan
14:00 CET	Luta 60'; Toçi 90'	Report	Nimani 47'; Doku 51'; Zefi 87'	Attendance: 70; Referee: Olsid Ferataj

19 November 2014	Laçi	2–0	Elbasani	Laçi Stadium, Laç
13:30 CET	Ćetković 78'; Jubani 85'	Report		Attendance: 100; Referee: Skerdi Greca

Laçi advanced to the quarter finals.

5 November 2014	Lushnja	0–1	Partizani	Abdurrahman Roza Haxhiu Stadium, Lushnjë
14:00 CET		Report	Cuculi 78'	Attendance: 300; Referee: Emirjon Sino

19 November 2014	Partizani	4–1	Lushnja	Internacional Tirana Stadium, Pezë e Vogël
13:30 CET	Fejzullahu 25'; Dushku 44'; Jaupaj 80'; Batha 90+2' (pen.)	Report	Gjyla 16'	Attendance: 100; Referee: Hermal Llapra

Partizani advanced to the quarter finals.

5 November 2014	Bylis	0–1	Tirana	Adush Muça Stadium, Ballsh
14:00 CET		Report	Bušić 82'	Attendance: 200; Referee: Hermal Llapra

20 November 2014	Tirana	6–0	Bylis	Selman Stërmasi Stadium, Tirana
13:30 CET	Olaki 13'; Taku 34', 56'; Ndikumana 47'; El. Bakaj 66'; Halili 81'	Report		Referee: Olsid Ferataj

Tirana advanced to the quarter finals.

5 November 2014	Kastrioti	0–4	Vllaznia	Kastrioti Stadium, Krujë
14:00 CET		Report	Gocaj 23'; Sosa 27', 45'; Kraja 67'	Attendance: 50; Referee: Juxhin Xhaja

19 November 2014	Vllaznia	0–0	Kastrioti	Loro Boriçi Stadium, Shkodër
13:30 CET		Report		Referee: Klodian Shahini

Vllaznia advanced to the quarter finals.

5 November 2014	Pogradeci	0–2	Kukësi	Gjorgji Kyçyku Stadium, Pogradec
14:00 CET		Report	Perić 31'; Shameti 80'	Attendance: 500; Referee: Fatjon Xhemalaj

19 November 2014	Kukësi	5–2	Pogradeci	Zeqir Ymeri Stadium, Kukës
13:30 CET	Allmuça 20' (pen.); Hasani 22'; Dosti 27'; Hysa 29'; Jonuzi 68'	Report	Zeqollari 53'; Çekiçi 65'	Attendance: 300; Referee: Sokol Çekaj

Kukësi advanced to the quarter finals.

5 November 2014	Apolonia	2–1	Teuta	Loni Papuçiu Stadium, Fier
14:00 CET	Naçi 53'; Mahilaj 55'	Report	Hoxha 36'	Attendance: 100; Referee: Blerim Ziri

19 November 2014	Teuta	0–0	Apolonia	Niko Dovana Stadium, Durrës
13:30 CET		Report		Attendance: 130; Referee: Lorenc Jemini

Apolonia advanced to the quarter finals.

== Quarter-finals ==
All eight qualified teams from the second round progressed to the third round. The first legs were played on 4 February 2015 and the second legs took place on 18 February 2015.

Team 1	Agg.	Team 2	1st leg	2nd leg
Flamurtari (I)	2–4	Skënderbeu (I)	1–1	1–3
Laçi (I)	3–2	Partizani (I)	0–2	3–0 (a.e.t.)
Kukësi (I)	2–0	Vllaznia (I)	2–0	0–0
Tirana (I)	5–2	Apolonia (I)	2–2	3–0

4 February 2015	Flamurtari	1–1	Skënderbeu	Flamurtari Stadium, Vlorë
14:00 CET	Nikolić 62'	Report	Shkëmbi 77' (pen.)	Attendance: 1,500; Referee: Lorenc Jemini

18 February 2015	Skënderbeu	3–1	Flamurtari	Skënderbeu Stadium, Korçë
14:00 CET	Osmani 45+1'; Berisha 55'; Shkëmbi 90'	Report	Hodža 73'	Attendance: 1,000; Referee: Enea Jorgji

Skënderbeu advanced to the semi finals.

4 February 2015	Partizani	2–0	Laçi	Redi Maloku Stadium, Fushë-Krujë
17:00 CET	Fazliu 9'; Bylykbashi 17'	Report		Attendance: 500; Referee: Remzi Sadiku

18 February 2015	Laçi	3–0 (a.e.t.)	Partizani	Laçi Stadium, Laç
14:00 CET	Adeniyi 56'; Meto 79'; Ćetković 120'	Report		Referee: Laver Alla

Laçi advanced to the semi finals.

4 February 2015	Vllaznia	0–2	Kukësi	Loro Boriçi Stadium, Shkodër
14:00 CET		Report	Pejić 3'; Lushtaku 15' (pen.)	Attendance: 500; Referee: Enea Jorgji

18 February 2015	Kukësi	0–0	Vllaznia	Zeqir Ymeri Stadium, Kukës
14:00 CET		Report		Attendance: 1,800; Referee: Adrian Beqiraj

Kukësi advanced to the semi finals.

4 February 2015	Tirana	2–2	Apolonia	Kastrioti Stadium, Krujë
14:00 CET	Morina 49'; Karabeci 66'	Report	Ribaj 30'; Uzuni 45'	Referee: Andi Koçi

18 February 2015	Apolonia	0–3	Tirana	Loni Papuçiu Stadium, Fier
17:00 CET		Report	Pashaj 17'; Taku 57'; Bušić 85'	Referee: Lorenc Jemini

Tirana advanced to the semi finals.

== Semi-finals ==
Team 1	Agg.	Team 2	1st leg	2nd leg
Kukësi (I)	2–1	Skënderbeu (I)	1–0	1–1
Tirana (I)	0–1	Laçi (I)	0–0	0–1

8 April 2015	Kukësi	1–0	Skënderbeu	Zeqir Ymeri Stadium, Kukës
14:00 CEST	Pejić 6'	Report		Referee: Andi Koçi

22 April 2015	Skënderbeu	1–1	Kukësi	Skënderbeu Stadium, Korçë
17:30 CEST	Progni 15'	Report	Pejić 24'	Referee: Enea Jorgji

Kukësi advanced to the final.

8 April 2015	Tirana	0–0	Laçi	Qemal Stafa Stadium, Tirana
17:00 CEST		Report		Referee: Kridens Meta

22 April 2015	Laçi	1–0	Tirana	Laçi Stadium, Laç
17:30 CEST	Adeniyi 62'	Report		Referee: Bardhyl Pashaj

Laçi advanced to the final.

== Final ==
29 May 2015
20:00

Kukësi	1–2	Laçi
Hasani 45+1'	Report	Veliaj 29'; Adeniyi 61'

Qemal Stafa Stadium, Tirana
Attendance: 6,000
Referee: Lorenc Jemini
