= 2015 Albanian Cup final =

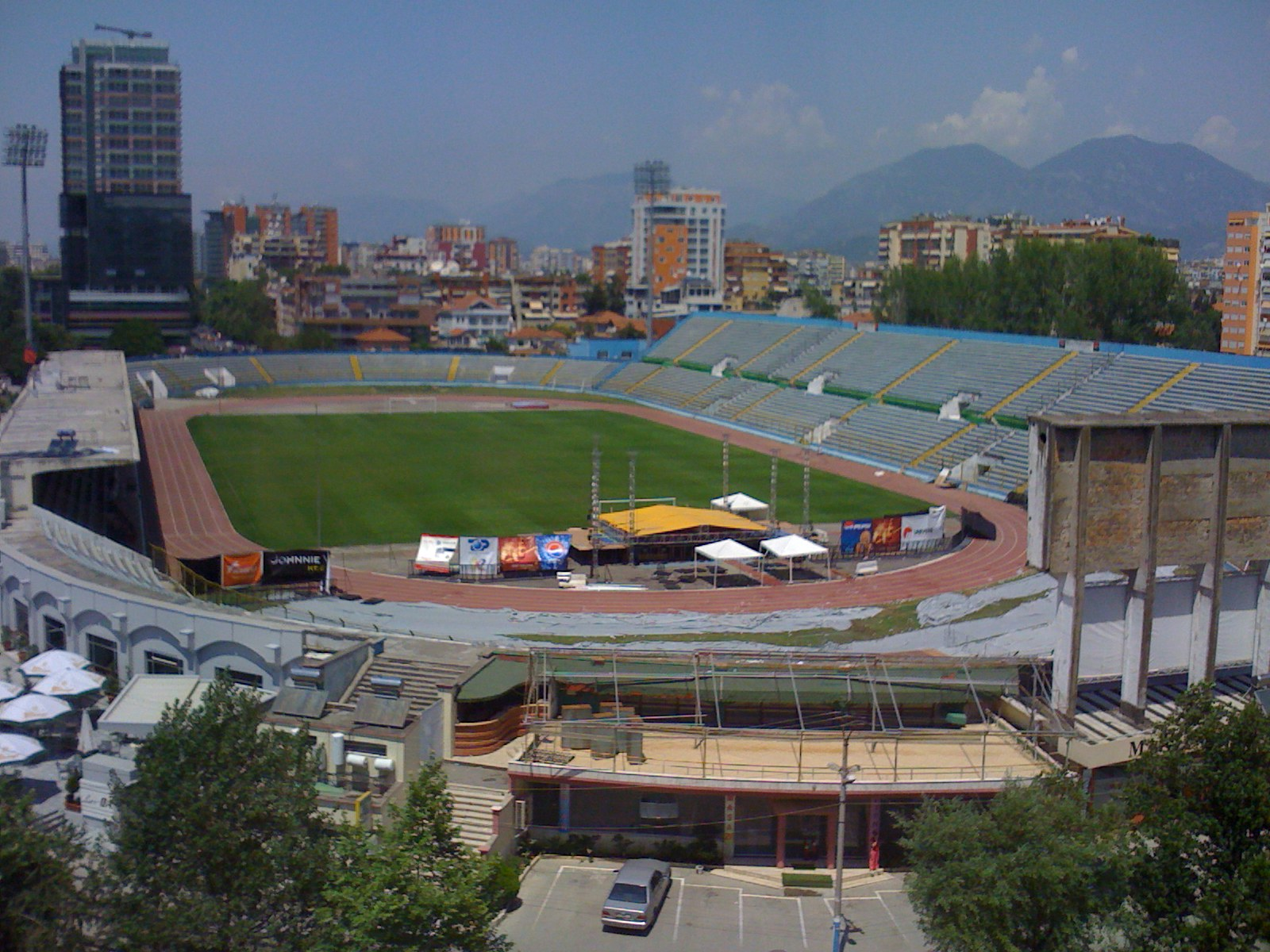
- The Qemal Stafa Stadium in Tirana held the final
- Event: 2014–15 Albanian Cup
Kukësi	Laçi
1	2
- Date: 29 May 2015
- Venue: Qemal Stafa Stadium, Tirana
- Referee: Lorenc Jemini
- Attendance: 6,000
- Weather: Sunny; 28 °C (82 °F)

The 2015 Albanian Cup final was a football match played on 29 May 2015 to decide the winner of the 2014–15 Albanian Cup, the 63rd edition of Albania's primary football cup.

The match, contested by FK Kukësi and KF Laçi, took place on 29 May 2015 at Qemal Stafa Stadium in Tirana, and kicked off at 20:00 p.m. It was the second time either club had reached the final of the Albanian Cup, with KF Laçi having won the 2012–13 Albanian Cup Final against Bylis Ballsh and FK Kukësi having lost to Flamurtari Vlorë in the 2013–14 Albanian Cup Final. KF Laçi won the game through a Segun Adeniyi winner to win the Albanian Cup for a second time in their history and a second time. In Albania, the match was televised by TVSH and SuperSport.

The first goal of the game was scored by Emiljano Veliaj through a free kick in the 29th minute, and Edon Hasani scored the equaliser just before half time, with Segun Adeniyi scoring the winning goal in the 61st minute. The competition winners were awarded a place in the first qualifying round of the 2015–16 Europa League competition.

== Match ==
=== Details ===
29 May 2015
20:00 (CEST)

Kukësi	1–2	Laçi
Hasani 45+1'	Report	Veliaj 29'; Adeniyi 61'

Qemal Stafa Stadium, Tirana
Attendance: 6,000
Referee: Lorenc Jemini

Kukësi	Laçi

GK	1	(Albania) Argjent Halili
RB	13	(Albania) Rrahman Hallaçi
CB	4	(Albania) Ylli Shameti
CB	24	(Albania) Renato Malota	(yellow card) 71'
LB	7	(Albania) Gledi Mici	(yellow card) 28'
RM	19	(Albania) Hair Zeqiri
CM	16	(Albania) Edon Hasani
CM	33	(Brazil) Jefferson	(yellow card) 59'
LM	11	(Albania) Vilfor Hysa	(yellow card) 69'
CF	10	(Kosovo) Kushtrim Lushtaku		(substituted off) 44'
CF	22	(Croatia) Pero Pejić
Substitutes:
GK	98	(Moldova) Dumitru Stajila
DF	2	(Albania) Endri Muçmata
DF	15	(Brazil) Márcio Pit		(substituted on) 44'
MF	14	(Albania) Albi Dosti
MF	20	(Kosovo) Yll Hoxha		(substituted on) 69'
MF	27	(Germany) Ndriqim Halili
MF	77	(Albania) Fjoart Jonuzi
Manager:
(Serbia) Miodrag Radanović

GK	31	(Montenegro) Miroslav Vujadinović	(yellow card) 88'
RB	3	(Albania) Emiliano Çela
CB	4	(Croatia) Stipe Buljan
CB	5	(Albania) Arjan Sheta	(yellow card) 41'
LB	11	(Albania) Taulant Sefgjinaj	(yellow card) 64'
RM	14	(Kosovo) Argjend Mustafa
CM	21	(Albania) Olsi Teqja
LM	20	(Montenegro) Marko Ćetković		(substituted off) 44'
RF	18	(Albania) Agim Meto
CF	8	(Nigeria) Segun Adeniyi
LF	28	(Albania) Emiliano Veliaj	(yellow card) 25'
Substitutes:
GK	1	(Albania) Shpëtim Moçka
DF	7	(Albania) Elton Doku
MF	16	(Albania) Edison Ndreca
MF	17	(Albania) Alfredo Rafael Sosa
MF	19	(Albania) Valdan Nimani		(substituted on) 86'
FW	9	(Albania) Aldo Mitraj
FW	22	(Albania) Arber Haliti
Manager:
(Albania) Armando Cungu

Match officials

- Assistant referees:
  - Egin Doda
  - Denis Rexha
- Fourth official: Ilir Tartari
- Reserve official: Sokol Jareci

Match rules

- 90 minutes.
- 30 minutes of extra-time if necessary.
- Penalty shoot-out if scores still level.
- Seven named substitutes.
- Maximum of three substitutions.
