= Astrit Fazliu =

Albanian footballer

Personal information
- Date of birth: 28 October 1987 (age 39)
- Place of birth: Ferizaj, SFR Yugoslavia
- Height: 1.77 m (5 ft 9 1/2 in)
- Position: Winger

Team information
- Current team: Lepenci

Senior career*
| Years | Team | Apps | (Gls) |
| 2006–2007 | Ferizaj | 20 | (6) |
| 2007–2008 | Ulpiana | 22 | (5) |
| 2008–2009 | Ferizaj | 28 | (11) |
| 2009–2012 | Prishtina | 21 | (4) |
| 2012–2013 | Ferizaj | 30 | (27) |
| 2013–2014 | Shkëndija | 13 | (2) |
| 2014–2016 | Partizani | 49 | (6) |
| 2016–2017 | Flamurtari | 26 | (1) |
| 2017–2018 | Drita | 27 | (4) |
| 2018–2019 | Feronikeli | 45 | (6) |
| 2020–2022 | Drita | 78 | (15) |
| 2022–2023 | Ferizaj | 16 | (2) |
| 2023–2024 | Vjosa | | |

Managerial career
- 2024–2025: Dielli
- 2025–: Lepenci
- * Club domestic league appearances and goals as of 25 June 2025

Astrit Fazliu (born 18 October 1987) is a Kosovan former professional footballer who played as a winger.

== Club career ==
=== Shkëndija ===
In December 2013, Fazliu signed a one-and-a-half-year contract with the Macedonian First League side Shkëndija, with an renew option. He was given squad number 7 for the second part of the 2013–14 season.

==== 2013–14 season ====
He had to wait until March to make his debut in the elite of Macedonian football, playing 65 minutes in a 3–0 triumph against Makedonija. Fazliu scored his first goal for Shkëndija in his fifth appearance for the club, netting the second in 91st minute to seal the 0–2 away success against Turnovo. He scored his second goal of the season in Tetovo derby, netting the fifth of the 5–0 home win against Renova. He ended his first six months with the club by scoring twice in 12 appearances, all in league, with the team securing a spot in first qualifying round of 2014–15 UEFA Europa League.

=== Partizani Tirana ===
On 19 August 2014, Fazliu completed a transfer to the second-most successful club in Albania, Partizani Tirana, signing a one-year deal with a salary $3,500 per month. After the summer transfer window was closed, Partizani had committed 32 transfers, signing 14 players and releasing 18, a record in Albanian football. During his presentation, Fazliu was allocated squad number 7 and dubbed his Partizani move as "the right choice".

==== 2014–15 season ====
Fazliu made his club debut on 24 August in the first week of 2014–15 Albanian Superliga, appearing as a second-half substitute in the 1–1 away draw against Laçi. He replaced the fellow debutant Emiljano Vila. Fazliu played for the first time in Qemal Stafa Stadium on 11 September during the league encounter against Skënderbeu Korçë, again as a substitute in an eventual 1–0 win, first league win of the 2014–15 season. Eight days later, only in his second match as a starter, Fazliu scored his first goal against Teuta Durrës, netting the second of the match in the 44th minute after an assist by Račić, who had scored four minutes earlier.

One week later, Fazliu played in the famous Tirana derby against the rivals of Tirana, appearing in the last 11 minutes of the goalless draw at empty Qemal Stafa Stadium. During the October, Fazliu was able to make his Albanian Cup debut in the first leg of the first round against Iliria Fushë-Krujë, playing full-90 minutes in a 3–0 away win; later, in the returning match, he scored the first goal in a 2–1 home win, helping the team to pass the round with the aggregate 5–1. Partizani finished the first part of the season with 18 points, tied with rivals of Tirana as a leader.

Fazliu started the second part of the season by playing 18 minutes in a 1–1 away draw against Laçi on 25 January of the following year. One month later, he scored his second goal of the season against Teuta Durrës, contributing in a 2–1 home win. In the next fixture against Flamurtari, while the match was still 1–1, Fazliu missed an opportunity with an empty goal; however Partizani managed to win 2–1. On 4 May 2015, in the fourth and the last derby against Tirana, while Partizani was 1–0 down, Fazliu equalized in the 55th minute with a chip after the cross of Mazrekaj, helping the team to get a 2–2 draw and to end the season without losing a derby. On 22 May 2015, in the final of the league, Fazliu scored his fourth goal of the league, contributing in a 3–0 win against Elbasani at the neutral field Kamëz Stadium.

Fazliu ended his first season with Partizani appearing in 37 matches in all competitions, including 33 in league, with the team who failed to win the league but secured the third place, meaning that the team will play in European competitions for the first time after seven years. Partizani also reached the quarter-finals of Albanian Cup where they fell against Laçi in two-legged match. Fazliu scored six goals during the season, including four in league.

==== 2015–16 season ====
For the new season, Fazliu left the number 9 after the arrival of Sebino Plaku, taking the vacant number 7. In team's first match of 2015–16 season against Norwegian side Strømsgodset, valid for the first qualifying round of Europa League, Fazliu entered in the field in the 60th minute and scored the only goal eight minutes later in a 1–3 defeat of Partizani at Marienlyst Stadion. In the returning match at Qemal Stafa Stadium, Fazliu played full-90 minutes, as Partizani suffered another defeat in the very last moments, thus ending the European campaign.

=== Flamurtari Vlorë ===
On 30 May 2016, Fazliu joined fellow Albanian Superliga side Flamurtari as a free agent, signing a one-year contract. He was presented on the same day along with the new coach Gugash Magani, where he was given the vacant squad number 7. In an interview months later, Fazliu stated that leaving Partizani for Flamurtari was "a good decision".

Fazliu was an unused substitute in the opening league match of 2016–17 against Skënderbeu Korçë due to an injury. He returned from the injury in the second matchday on 11 September, playing 60 minutes in a 5–0 thrashing of Luftëtari Gjirokastër at home. He had ups and downs during the season as he spent it between bench and field, collecting 30 matches, including 26 in league, scoring only 1 time, the last of the 4–1 home win over Korabi Peshkopi. In June 2017, he left the team by terminating his contract by mutual consent, becoming a free agent in the process.

=== Drita ===
On 13 June 2017, Fazliu returned to Kosovo by signing with Drita. In the 2017–18 season, he played 27 matches and scored 4 goals. Drita won the championship for the second time after 15 years.

=== Feronikeli ===
On 2 June 2018, Fazliu completed a transfer to fellow Football Superleague of Kosovo side Feronikeli for an undisclosed fee.

=== Return to Drita ===
In December 2019 it was confirmed, that Fazliu had returned to FC Drita, signing a deal until the summer 2021, starting from 2020.

== Personal life ==
On 3 October 2015, Fazliu's wife gave birth to the couple's first son, named Dajen.

== Career statistics ==
As of 29 September 2018

| Club | Season | League | | | Cup | | Continental | | Total | |
| Club | Season | Division | Apps | Goals | Apps | Goals | Apps | Goals | Apps | Goals |
|---|---|---|---|---|---|---|---|---|---|---|
| Shkëndija | 2013–14 | Macedonian First Football League | 12 | 2 | 0 | 0 | — | | 12 | 2 |
| Shkëndija | 2014–15 | Macedonian First Football League | 1 | 0 | 0 | 0 | 1 (Note: All appearance(s) in UEFA Europa League) | 0 | 2 | 0 |
| Shkëndija | Total | | 13 | 2 | 0 | 0 | 1 | 0 | 14 | 2 |
| Partizani Tirana | 2014–15 | Albanian Superliga | 33 | 4 | 4 | 2 | — | | 37 | 6 |
| Partizani Tirana | 2015–16 | Albanian Superliga | 16 | 2 | 3 | 0 | 2 | 1 | 21 | 3 |
| Partizani Tirana | Total | | 49 | 6 | 7 | 2 | 2 | 1 | 58 | 9 |
| Flamurtari | 2016–17 | Albanian Superliga | 26 | 1 | 4 | 0 | — | | 30 | 1 |
| Drita | 2017–18 | Football Superleague of Kosovo | 27 | 4 | 0 | 0 | — | | 27 | 4 |
| Feronikeli | 2018–19 | Football Superleague of Kosovo | 7 | 2 | 0 | 0 | — | | 7 | 2 |
| Career total | | | 121 | 15 | 11 | 2 | 3 | 1 | 136 | 18 |

== Honours ==
Drita

- Football Superleague of Kosovo: 2017–18
