= Endri =

- Gender: Male

Origin
- Region of origin: Albania, Kosovo

Other names
- Related names: Endrit

Endri is a predominantly an Albanian masculine given name and may refer to:

- Endri Bakiu (born 1987), Albanian footballer
- Endri Çekiçi (born 1996), Albanian footballer
- Endri Dalipi (born 1983), Albanian footballer
- Endri Dema (born 2004), Albanian footballer
- Endri Fuga (born 1981), Albanian politician
- Endri Hasa (born 1981), Albanian politician
- Endri Karina (born 1989), Albanian weightlifter
- Endri Muçmata (born 1996), Albanian footballer
- Endri Vinter (born 1993), Estonian swimmer
