= Argjend =

Argjend or Argjent is a Kosovar-Albanian masculine given name that may refer to:

- Argjend Beqiri (born 1974), Macedonian footballer and manager of Albanian ethnicity
- Argjent Halili (born 1982), Albanian football goalkeeper
- Argjend Malaj (born 1994), Kosovar-Albanian football midfielder
- Argjend Mustafa (born 1992), Kosovar-Albanian football midfielder
- Argjend Mustafa (footballer, born 1993), Kosovar-Albanian football player
