= Endrit =

Endrit is an Albanian name for boys, meaning “light”. Notable people with the name include:

- Endrit Braimllari (born 1988), Albanian politician
- Endrit Hysenagolli (born 1988), Albanian basketball player
- Endrit Idrizaj (born 1989), Albanian footballer
- Endrit Karameto (born 1995), Albanian football player
- Endrit Shala (born 1981), Kosovo politician
- Endrit Vrapi (born 1982), Albanian football player
- Endrit Ferizoli, performer on the Trollstation YouTube channel
