= Klajdi =

- Gender: Male

Origin
- Region of origin: Albania, Kosovo

Klajdi is an Albanian masculine given name and may refer to:

- Klajdi Broshka (born 1993), Albanian footballer
- Klajdi Kuka (born 1990), Albanian footballer
- Klajdi Toska (born 1994), Albanian footballer
