= AF Kamza 05 =

Albanian football club

- Full name: Akademia e Futbollit Kamza 05
- Nickname(s): Kamzalinjt; Blutë
- Short name: Kamza 05
- Founded: 24 September 2021; 3 years ago
- Ground: Kamëz Stadium
- Capacity: 5,500
- President: Valter Marrashi
- Head coach: Ardit Marku
Home colours	Away colours

AF Kamza 05 (Albanian: Akademia e Futbollit Kamza 05), also known as Kamza 05, is an Albanian football club based in Kamëz, Tirana County. The club is the successor of FC Kamza and their home ground is Kamëz Stadium.
