= Amir Rrahmani =

Kosovar footballer (born 1994)

Personal information
- Full name: Amir Kadri Rrahmani
- Date of birth: 24 February 1994 (age 32)
- Place of birth: Pristina, Kosovo
- Height: 1.92 m (6 ft 4 in)
- Position: Centre-back

Team information
- Current team: Napoli
- Number: 13

Youth career
- 2003–2009: Kosova (P)
- 2009–2010: Ramiz Sadiku
- 2010–2011: Drenica

Senior career*
Years	Team	Apps	(Gls)
2011–2013	Drenica	40	(1)
2013–2015	Partizani	59	(3)
2015–2016	RNK Split	41	(1)
2016–2019	Dinamo Zagreb	40	(4)
2016–2017	→ Lokomotiva (loan)	28	(1)
2019–2020	Hellas Verona	36	(0)
2020–	Napoli	178	(13)

International career
2013	Albania U19	1	(1)
2013–2014	Albania U21	9	(0)
2014–2015	Albania	2	(1)
2014–2026	Kosovo	67	(7)
- * Club domestic league appearances and goals as of 21 November 2026

Amir Kadri Rrahmani (born 24 February 1994) is a Kosovar professional footballer who plays as a centre-back for Serie A club Napoli.

== Club career ==
=== Drenica ===
Born in Pristina to Albanian parents from Skenderaj, Rrahmani began his football career with the youth team of Drenica, where he was promoted to the senior team during the 2011–12 campaign where he immediately began to impress despite being only 17 years old. He went on trial with Albanian Superliga side Kastrioti Krujë in the summer of 2012, where he impressed the coaching staff. However, a deal to sign the player could not be agreed, with negotiations stalled over a compensation package which was reported to be in the region of €3,000. He returned to KF Drenica where he became an important first team player as he helped his side finish just above the relegation playoff zone in the Kosovo Superleague. His contract expired at the end of the 2012–13 season and he was allowed to leave Drenica on a free transfer.

=== Partizani ===
Rrahmani was subject to interest by a host of Kategoria Superiore sides, with the reigning champions Skënderbeu formally offering the 19-year-old a contract to join the club, but he would ultimately decide to join Partizani instead. He made his debut for his new club on 21 September 2013 in an away game against Besa, where he came on as a substitute after half time in the 1–0 win for his side.

At the end of 2014–15 season, Rrahmani was named "Talent of the Year" by association "Sporti na bashkon".

=== RNK Split ===
On 5 June 2015, Rrahmani finished his career at Partizani and moved to Croatian side RNK Split, where he joined the fellow Albanian player Sokol Cikalleshi. He made his competitive debut for the club on 13 July in the opening league match of 2015–16 season against Lokomotiva, where he played full-90 minutes in a 2–1 home win. Following that, Rrahmani become a regular starter in Zoran Vulić and later Goran Sablić lineup, establish himself in the center of defence.

On 30 October, Rrahmani made a solid performance against the league leaders Dinamo Zagreb for a 1–0 home win, which lead him to be named in the Team of the Week. On 22 November, following his good display in the 1–1 away draw against Istra 1961, Rrahmani was named again in the Team of the Week.

Rrahmani commenced 2016 by playing full-90 minutes in the team's first league match of 2016, a 1–1 away draw against Inter Zaprešić, which was followed by another full-90 minutes against Zagreb, which led him to be named again in the Team of the Week. On 2 March 2016, Rrrahmani netted his first goal for the club during the 1–2 home defeat to Rijeka. This lead him to another Team of the Week selection. Rrahmani continued with his solid appearances which led to his value rising to an estimated €1 million. He was named again in the Team of the Week for the 8th time following a goalless draw against Osijek on 8 April.

=== Dinamo Zagreb ===
On 30 August 2016, Rrahmani joined with champion of Croatian First League side Dinamo Zagreb. Dinamo Zagreb reportedly paid a €1.6 million transfer fee.

==== Loan at Lokomotiva ====
Eight days after the transfer to Dinamo Zagreb, Rrahmani joined with another Croatian First League side Lokomotiva, on a season-long loan. On 11 September 2016, he made his debut in a 2–3 away win against Slaven Belupo after being named in the starting line-up.

==== Return from loan ====
On 21 June 2017, Rrahmani returned to Croatian First League side Dinamo Zagreb. A month later, he made his debut in a 4–0 home win against Cibalia after coming on as a substitute at 68th minute in place of Filip Benković.

=== Hellas Verona ===
On 26 June 2019, Rrahmani joined Serie A side Hellas Verona, on a four-year contract. Hellas Verona reportedly paid around €2 million transfer fee. One day later, the club confirmed that Rrahmani had joined on a permanent transfer. On 18 August 2019, he made his debut with Hellas Verona in the third round of 2019–20 Coppa Italia against Cremonese after being named in the starting line-up.

=== Napoli ===
On 20 January 2020, Rrahmani joined Serie A side Napoli. Napoli reportedly paid a €14 million transfer fee. He won the Serie A in the 2022–23 season.

==== Return to Hellas Verona as loan ====
On 20 January 2020, Rrahmani was sent back on loan to Hellas Verona for the remainder of the season, with the club paying wages of £8,000 per week. Six days later, he played the first game after the return against Lecce after being named in the starting line-up.

==== Return from loan ====
On 24 August 2020, Rrahmani returned to Napoli. On 3 January 2021, he made his debut in a 1–4 away win against Cagliari after coming on as a substitute at 87th minute in place of Kostas Manolas. On 12 March 2024, Rrahmani scored his first UEFA Champions League goal during Napoli's 3–1 away defeat to Barcelona in the Round of 16 second leg, where his club ultimately exited the competition with a 4–2 aggregate loss.

Rrahmani played a pivotal role in Napoli's triumphant 2024–25 Serie A campaign under Antonio Conte. He led the team in minutes played and topped several defensive metrics, including clearances (4.7 per 90 minutes) and aerial duels won (3.4 per 90 minutes), boasting a 69.6% success rate in aerial challenges. Additionally, Rrahmani led all Serie A players in touches (3,195), total passes (2,769), and successful passes (2,521) over the season.

== International career ==
Being of Albanian descent from Kosovo, Rrahmani received Albanian citizenship on 4 June 2013 among Albania senior side member Agon Mehmeti, and fellow Albania U21 players Haxhi Neziraj, Valentin Gjokaj and Herolind Shala.

=== Albania U21 ===
Principally Rrahmani was called up by Skënder Gega for a friendly match of the Albania U21 side against Macedonia in February 2013. He came as a later upcoming in the Albania U21's last 4 matches for the 2015 UEFA European Under-21 Championship in last four months of the tournament, exactly from August to November 2013.

=== Kosovo ===
Rrahmani was capped once for the Kosovo national team in a sanctioned match by FIFA on 25 May 2014 against Senegal, where he played the full 90 minutes in a 3–1 loss.

=== Albania ===
Following his good performances at both Partizani Tirana and the Albania under-21 side, Rrahmani was called up by the Albania senior side coach Gianni De Biasi for a friendly match on 8 June 2014 against San Marino. He made his debut against the side after coming on as a substitute in place of fellow 20-year-old defender Elseid Hysaj in the 82nd minute of the match, which finished in a 0–3 away victory. On 13 November 2015, Rrahmani scored against Kosovo, a team which he previously played for.

=== Return to Kosovo ===
In August 2016, Rrahmani decided to switch his international allegiance to represent Kosovo. On 11 June 2017, he scored his first goal for Kosovo in a 4–1 defeat against Turkey during the 2018 FIFA World Cup qualification.

On 11 September 2026, Hodaj & Partners Law Firm announced that it had taken on the legal representation of Rrahmani in relation to alleged attacks, threats, insults and damage to his reputation by individuals associated with the Football Federation of Kosovo. On the same day, Rrahmani announced his retirement from the Kosovo national team, citing ongoing disputes with the federation's leadership, a lack of effective responses to problems and complaints and alleged attacks against him.

== Career statistics ==
=== Club ===
As of match played 21 November 2026

Appearances and goals by club, season and competition
Club	Season	League			National cup (Note: Includes Albanian Cup, Croatian Cup, Coppa Italia)		Europe		Other		Total	
Club	Season	Division	Apps	Goals	Apps	Goals	Apps	Goals	Apps	Goals	Apps	Goals
Drenica	2010–11	Kosovo Superleague	3	0	0	0	—		—		3	0
Drenica	2011–12	Kosovo Superleague	17	0	0	0	—		—		17	0
Drenica	2012–13	Kosovo Superleague	20	1	0	0	—		—		20	1
Drenica	Total		40	1	0	0	—		—		40	1
Partizani	2013–14	Kategoria Superiore	25	0	4	0	—		—		29	0
Partizani	2014–15	Kategoria Superiore	34	3	3	0	—		—		37	3
Partizani	Total		59	3	7	0	—		—		66	3
Split	2015–16	Prva HNL	34	1	0	0	—		—		34	1
Split	2016–17	Prva HNL	7	0	0	0	—		—		7	0
Split	Total		41	1	0	0	—		—		41	1
Lokomotiva (loan)	2016–17	Prva HNL	28	1	3	0	—		—		31	1
Dinamo Zagreb	2017–18	Prva HNL	25	1	4	0	2 (Note: Appearances in UEFA Europa League)	0	—		31	1
Dinamo Zagreb	2018–19	Prva HNL	15	3	4	0	7	0	—		26	3
Dinamo Zagreb	Total		40	4	8	0	9	0	—		57	4
Hellas Verona	2019–20	Serie A	36	0	1	0	—		—		37	0
Napoli	2020–21	Serie A	16	1	2	0	2	0	0	0	20	1
Napoli	2021–22	Serie A	33	4	1	0	7	0	—		41	4
Napoli	2022–23	Serie A	29	2	0	0	7 (Note: Appearances in UEFA Champions League)	0	—		36	2
Napoli	2023–24	Serie A	30	3	0	0	7	1	2 (Note: Appearances in Supercoppa Italiana)	0	39	4
Napoli	2024–25	Serie A	38	1	1	0	—		—		39	1
Napoli	2025–26	Serie A	21	2	1	0	3	0	2	0	27	2
Napoli	2026–27	Serie A	11	0	0	0	4	1	—		15	1
Napoli	Total		178	13	5	0	30	2	4	0	217	15
Career total			416	23	24	0	39	2	4	0	483	25

=== International ===
Appearances and goals by national team and year
National team	Year	Apps	Goals
Albania	2014	1	0
Albania	2015	1	1
Albania	Total	2	1
Kosovo	2014	1	0
Kosovo	2015	0	0
Kosovo	2016	3	0
Kosovo	2017	7	2
Kosovo	2018	9	1
Kosovo	2019	9	2
Kosovo	2020	5	0
Kosovo	2021	9	1
Kosovo	2022	6	0
Kosovo	2023	6	0
Kosovo	2024	7	1
Kosovo	2025	4	0
Kosovo	Total	67	7
Career total		69	8

Scores and results list Albania's and Kosovo's goal tally first, score column indicates score after each Rrahmani goal.

List of international goals scored by Amir Rrahmani
No.	Date	Venue	Opponent	Score	Result	Competition
Albania goals
1	13 November 2015	Pristina City Stadium, Pristina, Kosovo	Kosovo	2–2	2–2	Friendly
Kosovo goals
1	11 June 2017	Loro Boriçi Stadium, Shkodër, Albania	Turkey	1–1	1–4	2018 FIFA World Cup qualification
2	13 November 2017	Adem Jashari Olympic Stadium, Mitrovica, Kosovo	Latvia	1–1	4–3	Friendly
3	20 November 2018	Fadil Vokrri Stadium, Pristina, Kosovo	Azerbaijan	3–0	4–0	2018–19 UEFA Nations League D
4	21 March 2019	Fadil Vokrri Stadium, Pristina, Kosovo	Denmark	1–0	2–2	Friendly
5	14 October 2019	Fadil Vokrri Stadium, Pristina, Kosovo	Montenegro	1–0	2–0	UEFA Euro 2020 qualification
6	14 November 2021	Olympic Stadium, Athens, Greece	Greece	1–1	1–1	2022 FIFA World Cup qualification
7	15 October 2024	Fadil Vokrri Stadium, Pristina, Kosovo	Cyprus	1–0	3-0	2024–25 UEFA Nations League C

== Honours ==
Dinamo Zagreb

- Prva HNL: 2017–18, 2018–19
- Croatian Cup: 2017–18

Napoli

- Serie A: 2022–23, 2024–25
- Supercoppa Italiana: 2025–26

Individual

- Kategoria Superiore Talent of the Year: 2014 3rd place, 2015
- Serie A Team of the Season: 2024–25
- Serie A Team of the Year: 2024–25
