= Ardian Cuculi =

Macedonian footballer (born 1987)

Personal information
- Date of birth: 19 July 1987 (age 39)
- Place of birth: Bitola, SFR Yugoslavia
- Height: 1.86 m (6 ft 1 in)
- Position: Centre-back

Youth career
- 1998–2001: Vëllazërimi 77
- 2001–2005: Napredok

Senior career*
Years	Team	Apps	(Gls)
2005–2007	Vëllazërimi 77	37	(1)
2005–2014	Shkëndija	158	(3)
2008	→ Pobeda (loan)	5	(1)
2008–2009	→ Milano (loan)	27	(1)
2014–2015	Partizani Tirana	32	(0)
2015–2018	Shkëndija	88	(1)
2018–2019	Kukësi	31	(0)
2019–2022	Drita	85	(3)
2022–2023	Shkëndija	13	(0)

International career
2005–2006	Macedonia U17	8	(0)
2007	Macedonia U19	2	(0)
2014	Macedonia	6	(0)
- * Club domestic league appearances and goals

Ardian Cuculi (born 19 July 1987) is a Macedonian former professional footballer who played as a centre-back. He also holds Albanian citizenship.

== Club career ==
=== Shkëndija ===
Cuculi went on trial at Croatian club HNK Rijeka in the summer of 2012 but returned to Shkëndija for the 2012–13 season.

He was named in the 2013–14 Macedonian First League team of the year while at Shkëndija.

=== Partizani Tirana ===
Cuculi followed coach Shpëtim Duro on his way out of Shkëndija to Albanian Superliga side Partizani Tirana ahead of the 2014–15 season.

He made his debut for the club on 24 August in the opening week of 2014–15 Albanian Superliga against Laçi, playing full-90 minutes in a 1–1 draw. He scored his maiden goal for his new side in the first leg of 2014–15 Albanian Cup second round versus Lushnja, netting in a 79th minute via a free kick. He also wore the captain armband in the match.

Cuculi appeared in 32 league matches in the 2014–15 season, and left the club at the end of May 2015 after his contract run out.

=== Return at Shkëndija ===
On 6 June 2015, Cuculi returned to his first club Shkëndija by inking a two-year contract.

In the 2017–18 season, Cuculi made 30 league appearances as Shkëndija won the championship for the second time in history. He also played in five cup matches as the tournament ended in conquest, meaning that the team has completed an unforeseen domestic double.

On 18 June 2018, Cuculi announced his departure from club along with team captain Ferhan Hasani, with the players refusing to sign contract extensions.

=== Kukësi ===
On 13 August 2018, Kukësi announced to have signed Cuculi on a one-year contract, marking the return of the defender in the Albanian Superliga after three years. The player will reportedly earn €4,000 per month and various bonuses based on club's objectives. Cuculi made his official debut in the opening week of 2018–19 Albanian Superliga against Laçi, playing full-90 minutes as the match ended in a 1–1 draw. He captained Kukësi for the first time on 15 September in the 1–0 win at Teuta Durrës due to absence of Ylli Shameti.

== International career ==
Cuculi earned his first cap for Macedonia on 26 May 2014 in a friendly match against Cameroon, entering in the field in 26th minute by replacing the injured Goran Popov as the team lost 2–0.

== Outside football ==
Cuculi is a law graduate after gaining his degree in January 2010 from The FON University.

== Career statistics ==
=== Club ===
As of 15 September 2018

Appearances and goals by club, season and competition
Club	Season	League			Cup		Europe		Other		Total	
Club	Season	Division	Apps	Goals	Apps	Goals	Apps	Goals	Apps	Goals	Apps	Goals
Vëllazërimi 77	2005–06	Macedonian First Football League	23	0	0	0	—		—		23	0
Vëllazërimi 77	2006–07	Macedonian First Football League	14	1	0	0	—		—		14	1
Vëllazërimi 77	Total		37	1	0	0	—		—		37	1
Shkëndija	2006–07	Macedonian First Football League]	20	0	0	0	—		—		20	0
Shkëndija	2007–08	Macedonian First Football League]	21	0	0	0	—		—		21	0
Shkëndija	2009–10	Macedonian Second Football League	0	0	0	0	—		—		0	0
Shkëndija	2010–11	Macedonian First Football League]	23	1	0	0	—		—		23	1
Shkëndija	2011–12	Macedonian First Football League]	31	1	0	0	2 (Note: Appearance(s) in UEFA Champions League)	0	1 (Note: Appearance(s) in Macedonian Football Supercup)	0	34	1
Shkëndija	2012–13	Macedonian First Football League]	30	1	5	0	2 (Note: Appearance(s) in UEFA Europa League)	1	—		37	2
Shkëndija	2013–14	Macedonian First Football League]	33	0	2	0	—		—		35	0
Shkëndija	Total		158	3	7	0	4	0	1	0	170	4
Pobeda (loan)	2007–08	Macedonian First Football League]	5	1	0	0	—		—		5	1
Milano Kumanovë (loan)	2008–09	Macedonian First Football League]	27	1	0	0	1	0	—		28	1
Partizani Tirana	2014–15	Albanian Superliga	32	0	4	1	—		—		36	1
Shkëndija	2015–16	Macedonian First Football League]	30	0	5	1	2	0	—		39	1
Shkëndija	2016–17	Macedonian First Football League]	28	0	4	0	8	0	—		40	0
Shkëndija	2017–18	Macedonian First Football League]	30	1	5	0	7	0	—		42	1
Shkëndija	Total		88	1	14	1	21	0	—		123	2
Kukësi	2018–19	Albanian Superliga]	4	0	0	0	0	0	—		4	0
Career total			351	7	25	2	22	1	1	0	399	10

=== International ===
As of 9 October 2014

Appearances and goals by national team and year
National team	Year	Apps	Goals
Macedonia	2014	6	0
Total		6	0

== Honours ==
Shkëndija

- Macedonian First Football League: 2010–11, 2017–18
- Macedonian Second Football League: 2009–10
- Macedonian Football Cup: 2017–18
- Macedonian Football Supercup: 2011

Individual

- Macedonian First League team of the year: 2013–14
