= Mateo Zefi =

Albanian footballer

Personal information
- Full name: Mateo Zefi
- Date of birth: 13 April 1994 (age 32)
- Place of birth: Shkodër, Albania
- Height: 1.86 m (6 ft 1 in)
- Position: Defensive midfielder

Team information
- Current team: USD Rignanese

Youth career
- 2008–2012: FC Labeat

Senior career*
Years	Team	Apps	(Gls)
2012–2013	Ada Velipojë	28	(0)
2013	→ Juventus IF (loan)		
2014	Vllaznia	3	(0)
2014	Laçi	1	(0)
2015	Ada Velipojë	8	(0)
2015–2016	Besëlidhja	11	(0)
2016	Shënkolli	0	(0)
2018–2019	US Tonara		
2019–	Rignanese Calcio		
- * Club domestic league appearances and goals as of 19 August 2014

Mateo Zefi (born 13 April 1994 in Shkodër) is an Albanian football player, who currently plays for Italian lower league side USD Rignanese.

== Club career ==
On 19 July 2019, he then joined Italian club, Rignanese Calcio, after one season at another Italian club, US Tonara ASD.
