= Ndriqim Halili =

German-Albanian footballer

Personal information
- Date of birth: 29 January 1993 (age 33)
- Place of birth: Gjilan, FR Yugoslavia
- Height: 1.69 m (5 ft 7 in)
- Position: Attacking midfielder

Youth career
- SV Weingarten
- –2007: FV Ravensburg
- 2007–2012: VfB Stuttgart

Senior career*
Years	Team	Apps	(Gls)
2013–2014	Hamburger SV II	28	(1)
2014–2015	FK Kukësi	2	(0)
2015–2016	FV Ravensburg	21	(5)
2016–2017	SSV Ulm	20	(1)
2018	Angthong		
2018	Stuttgarter Kickers	9	(2)
2019	Differdange 03	9	(0)

International career
2008	Germany U15	1	(0)
2008–2009	Germany U16	2	(0)
- * Club domestic league appearances and goals as of 25 August 2017

Ndriqim Halili (born 29 January 1993) is a German–Albanian footballer who plays as an attacking midfielder.

== Club career ==
Halili was born in Gjilan. He has played in Thailand for Angthong. He has also played with FK Kukësi in the Albanian Superliga.

In January 2019, he left Stuttgarter Kickers after having joined them only in September 2018. He signed up with Luxembourg outfit Differdange 03 a few days later.
