= Bekim Erkoceviç =

Albanian footballer

Bekim Erkoçeviç
Personal information
- Date of birth: 23 April 1992 (age 34)
- Place of birth: Shkodër, Albania
- Height: 1.77 m (5 ft 10 in)
- Position: Striker

Youth career
- 2005–2011: Vllaznia Shkodër

Senior career*
Years	Team	Apps	(Gls)
2010–2012	Vllaznia	15	(1)
2012–2013	Ada	27	(7)
2013–2014	Burreli	12	(1)
2014–2015	Apolonia	24	(5)
2015	Besëlidhja	17	(1)
2016–2017	Vllaznia	5	(0)
2017–2018	Vllaznia B	11	(1)
2018–2019	Besëlidhja	13	(0)
2019	SV Grohn		
2019	Vatan Sport Bremen	14	(16)
2019–2020	FC Timi		
2020–2022	BV Essen		
2022–2023	Vatan Sport Bremen	3	(1)
2023–	Vatan Sport Bremen II	1	(1)
- * Club domestic league appearances and goals as of 08:57, 12 June 2024 (UTC)

Bekim Leo Erkoçeviç (born 23 April 1992) is an Albanian professional footballer who plays as a striker for German Bremen-Liga club Vatan Sport Bremen II.

== Career ==
=== Early career ===
Erkoçeviç made his debut on the last day of the 2010–11 campaign away to Bylis Ballsh in a 2–0 loss, coming on as a substitute for Ndriçim Shtubina in the 62nd minute. He was an unused substitute in the Europa League against Birkirkara on 30 June 2011.

Erkoçeviç left the club on 12 August 2012 after struggling to find minutes to play as he concluded 2011–12 with only 14 league matches, only 4 of them as starter.

=== Apolonia Fier ===
On 10 January 2014, Erkoçeviç came at Apolonia Fier on a one-week trial. Ten days later, he successfully passed the trial and signed a contract with the club.

=== Besëlidhja Lezhë ===
On 17 January 2015, Erkoçeviç agreed personal terms and joined Besëlidhja Lezhë for an undisclosed fee.

=== Vllaznia Shkodër ===
In January 2016, Erkoçeviç returned to his first club Vllaznia Shkodër after impressing in a friendly against his former side Ada Velipojë. He made his return debut a month later on 27 February in the goalless draw against Laçi where he appeared in the last minutes as a substitute. He made another four appearances, all of them as substitutes, collecting 95 minutes as Vllaznia finished 6th in championship.

During the 2016–17 season, Erkoçeviç made no league appearances. He, however, contributed with 3 cup appearances, notably scoring a brace in the returning fixture of second round against Kamza.

In September 2017, Erkoçeviç was assigned to their B-team, which participated in the first division. He scored his first goal of the season on 18 November by netting the third in the 1–3 win over Erzeni Shijak. That was his only strike in 11 appearances for the team as he left in mid-January.

=== Besëlidhja Lezhë return ===
On 16 January 2018, Erkoceviç returned to Besëlidhja Lezhë and signed a contract running until 2019. On 30 June, after finishing the season with 11 appearances and no goals, the club gave him a contract for the next season. He began the new season on 9 September by playing in team's opening league match against Burreli, receiving a red card for violent conduct towards an opponent player. Shortly after, he was suspended for the next five matches by Disciplinary Commission of AFA.

== Career statistics ==
As of 21 September 2018

Appearances and goals by club, season and competition
Club	Season	League			Cup		Continental		Total	
Club	Season	Division	Apps	Goals	Apps	Goals	Apps	Goals	Apps	Goals
Vllaznia Shkodër	2010–11	Albanian Superliga	1	0	0	0	—		1	0
Vllaznia Shkodër	2011–12	Albanian Superliga	14	1	5	1	0	0	19	2
Vllaznia Shkodër	Total		15	1	5	1	0	0	20	2
Ada Velipojë	2012–13	Albanian First Division	27	7	1	1	—		28	7
Burreli	2013–14	Albanian First Division	12	1	2	1	—		14	2
Apolonia Fier	2013–14	Albanian First Division	12	4	0	0	—		12	4
Apolonia Fier	2014–15	Albanian Superliga	12	1	2	1	—		14	2
Apolonia Fier	Total		24	5	2	1	—		26	6
Besëlidhja Lezhë	2014–15	Albanian First Division	13	1	0	0	—		13	1
Besëlidhja Lezhë	2015–16	Albanian First Division	4	0	2	0	—		6	0
Besëlidhja Lezhë	Total		17	1	2	0	0	0	19	1
Vllaznia Shkodër	2015–16	Albanian Superliga	5	0	0	0	—		5	0
Vllaznia Shkodër	2016–17	Albanian Superliga	0	0	3	2	—		3	2
Vllaznia Shkodër	Total		5	0	3	2	—		8	2
Vllaznia Shkodër B	2017–18	Albanian First Division	11	1	0	0	—		11	1
Besëlidhja Lezhë	2017–18	Albanian First Division	11	0	0	0	—		11	0
Besëlidhja Lezhë	2018–19	Albanian First Division	1	0	0	0	—		1	0
Besëlidhja Lezhë	Total		12	0	0	0	—		12	0
Career total			123	16	15	6	0	0	138	22
