= Nderim Nexhipi =

Macedonian footballer

Personal information
- Date of birth: 22 May 1984 (age 42)
- Place of birth: Skopje, SFR Yugoslavia (now North Macedonia)
- Height: 1.77 m (5 ft 10 in)
- Position: Attacking midfielder

Team information
- Current team: Ballkani (sporting director)

Youth career
- 1999–2000: Sloga Jugomagnat

Senior career*
| Years | Team | Apps | (Gls) |
| 2000–2001 | Sloga Jugomagnat | 21 | (8) |
| 2001–2003 | Hertha BSC | 12 | (1) |
| 2003–2004 | VfL Wolfsburg | 2 | (0) |
| 2004 | → Sloga Jugomagnat (loan) | 21 | (10) |
| 2005–2008 | Rabotnički | 102 | (27) |
| 2008–2010 | Lierse | 36 | (9) |
| 2011–2012 | Qarabağ | 17 | (0) |
| 2012 | Shkëndija | 16 | (6) |
| 2013 | Vaslui | 19 | (1) |
| 2013 | Shkëndija | 34 | (1) |
| 2014–2015 | Partizani Tirana | 58 | (17) |
| 2015–2016 | Flamurtari | 17 | (1) |
| 2016 | Shkëndija | 17 | (2) |
| 2016–2017 | Korabi Peshkopi | 16 | (1) |
| 2017 | Drita | 16 | (1) |
| Total | | 404 | (85) |

International career
| 2000–2002 | Macedonia U17 | 14 | (3) |
| 2002–2004 | Macedonia U19 | 7 | (1) |
| 2004–2005 | Macedonia U21 | 2 | (0) |
| 2012 | Macedonia | 1 | (0) |

Managerial career
- 2019–2021: Kukësi (sporting director)
- 2021–2023: Ballkani (sporting director)
- 2023: Manisa (sporting director)
- 2025: Shkupi (sporting director)
- 2025–: Ballkani (sporting director)
- * Club domestic league appearances and goals

Nderim Nexhipi (Macedonian: Ндерим Неџипи, romanized: Nderim Nedžipi; born 22 May 1984) is a Macedonian former professional footballer who played as an attacking midfielder and is currently the sporting director of Kosovo Superleague club Ballkani.

Nexhipi began his football development at Sloga Jugomagnat, where he also started his senior career in 2000. After early progress in the Macedonian First League, he moved to Germany, joining Hertha BSC and later VfL Wolfsburg, gaining experience in the Bundesliga. He later returned on loan to Sloga Jugomagnat before establishing himself at Rabotnički, where he made over 100 league appearances and scored 27 goals between 2005 and 2008.

In 2008, Nexhipi transferred to Belgian side Lierse, continuing his career in Western Europe. He then played for Qarabağ in Azerbaijan, before returning to the Balkans, where he had multiple spells with Shkëndija. His career also included stints at Vaslui in Romania, Partizani Tirana, Flamurtari and Korabi Peshkopi in Albania, where he acquired Albanian citizenship, and finally at Drita where he ended his career as a footballer.

At international level, Nexhipi represented Macedonia at youth levels (U17, U19 and U21) and made one senior appearance for the Macedonia national team in 2012.

After retiring as a player, Nexhipi transitioned into football administration, holding several executive roles. He served as sporting director of Kukësi (2019–2021), Ballkani (2021–2023), Manisa (2023) and Shkupi (2025). In 2025, he returned to Ballkani where he was reappointed sporting director.

== Club career ==
When he was 7 years old he joined his first football club, Sloga Jugomagnat Skopje, where he proved to be very talented. Eventually Nexhipi was noticed by talent scouts at the Macedonia – 21. At the age of 17 and after a training week at Hertha Berlin, he received a professional contract 2001–2003. During the first season under coach Jürgen Röber, he played several matches for the German Cup and he was twice in the selection for the league. Huub Stevens took the helm on then but gave no Nexhipi opportunities, partly because of injuries. At the request of Röber Nexhipi moved in 2003 to VfL Wolfsburg. Rober, however, was dismissed after six months and replaced by Eric Gerets, but he did not Nexhipi aside.

However, the midfielder went back to Macedonia in 2004. After a disagreement and misunderstanding between managers Nexhipi went to work at FK Vardar Skopje . There he was quickly taken away by coach Gjore Jovanovski of FK Rabotnički Kometal Skopje who absolutely wanted to. He has worked with the youth team player at his Sloga Jugomagnat.

His stay at Rabotnički Kometal was a success. The club won with him the championship three times in four years. In 2008 they also won the national cup, winning in the final 2–0, both goals from Nexhipi. The interest from Western Europe grew back, particularly in Belgium. During the summer of 2008 there were discussions with RC Genk, Lokeren and Lierse SK. Ultimately chose the Macedonian for the latter. Somewhat surprising given Lierse in the Second Division came out but the board, led by Maged Samy, could convince him by the ambitions of the club. Early January 2011 Lierse decided to break their contract.

After Belgium Nexhipi played for 18 months in the Azerbaijani club Qarabağ FK.

=== Vaslui ===
In February 2013, Nexhipi signed a 2,5 years contract with Vaslui. He made his Liga I debut on 25 February in the clash against Cluj, appearing as a substitute for Cauê in 70th minute. During the second part of the season, Nexhipi struggled to gain a place in the starting lineup and ended the season with seven league appearances, where he started in only one of them, collecting only 148 minutes. He terminated his contract with the club after the end of the season.

=== Partizani Tirana ===
On 31 January 2014, Nexhipi was signed by Albanian Superliga side Partizani Tirana, signing a contract until the end of the season with an option to extend it for another season. On 7 February 2014, he made his debut in Tirana derby I against the cross-town rivals of Tirana, playing in the last 35 minutes of a 1–0 loss at Qemal Stafa Stadium.

On 8 March, Nexhipi scored his first Albanian Superliga goal, netting an added-time equaliser for a 1–1 draw against Teuta Durrës at Niko Dovana Stadium. Four days later, Nexhipi was again in the scoresheet as he scored a penalty kick against Bylis Ballsh in an eventual 2–0 home win. On 16 March, Nexhipi continued with his solid performances as he scored again from the penalty spot against Vllaznia Shkodër, which was proved to be the winner. Six days later, in the last derby of the season, Nexhipi scored another last-minute equaliser in the 93rd minute.

Following that, on 10 May 2014, he scored his first brace of the season, both with penalties, in a 2–4 away win over Lushnja. Nexhipi ended his first season with Partizani in strong fashion, playing 15 matches and scored 6 goals, helping the club to finish 5th in its return season in Albanian Superliga, failing to earn a spot in European cups for the next season. After the end of the season, he extended his contract for another season.

For the 2014–15 season, Nexhipi was named the new capitan of Partizani Tirana after the goalkeeper Alban Hoxha decided to handed his captaincy to him, and became the vice-captain instead. He played his first match of the season in the opening day of 2014–15 Albanian Superliga season, where Partizani didn't go more than a 1–1 draw away against Laçi. In next match, away against Apolonia, he missed a penalty kick, with Partizani who lose the match 1–0 at Loni Papuçiu Stadium, he was stripped of his penalty duties by manager Shpëtim Duro.

=== Flamurtari Vlorë ===
On 26 July 2015, Nexhipi was signed by fellow Albanian Superliga side Flamurtari Vlorë on a 1+1 deal, taking the number 10 for the upcoming 2014–15 season. He was presented to the media in the very next day, where he thanked the club directors and fans for making this transfer possible, also refusing to comment his departure from Partizani.

=== Third spell at Shkëndija ===
After six unsuccessful months with Flamurtari Vlorë in Albanian Superliga, where the club struggled for results and ended the first part of the season in 7th place, Nexhipi terminated his contract with the club and returned to his home country where he signed an 18-month contract with Shkëndija of Macedonian First League, returning for the third time. He was presented on 11 January 2016 along with the new signings Stephan Vujčić, Alem Merajić and Kostadin Zahov.

=== Sports Director FK Kukësi ===
After retiring from football in the summer of 2017 he worked as sport analyst at SuperSport Albania, and only after few months he got an offer to take over as a sports director with the current Champions in Albania FK Kukësi.

== International career ==
He made his official debut with Macedonia on 14 December 2012, playing 75 minutes in a 4–1 away lose in a friendly match against Poland. That has his only cap for Macedonia, and, being an ethnic Albanian, he has awaken the interest of the Albanian Football Association to be part of Albania. Nexhipi has expressed his interest and has declared that he would make himself available should he receive a call-up.

== Personal life ==
He is the son of former Macedonian footballer Mensur Nexhipi.

== Honours ==
=== Club ===
Sloga Jugomagnat

- Macedonian First League: 2000–01
- Macedonian Football Cup: 2000–01

Rabotnički

- Macedonian First League: 2005–06, 2007–08
- Macedonian Football Cup: 2007–08

Shkëndija

- Macedonian Football Cup: 2015–16

Hertha BSC

- German League Cup:

2001-02

Sporting positions
| Preceded by Alban Hoxha | Partizani Tirana captain 2014–2015 | Succeeded by Alban Hoxha |
