= Mirsad Gruda =

Albanian footballer

Personal information
- Full name: Mirsad Gruda
- Date of birth: 13 May 1986 (age 40)
- Place of birth: Lezhë, Albania
- Height: 1.79 m (5 ft 10 in)
- Position: Forward

Youth career
- 1994–2005: Besëlidhja Lezhë

Senior career*
Years	Team	Apps	(Gls)
2005–2015	Besëlidhja Lezhë	58+	(14+)
- * Club domestic league appearances and goals as of 10 February 2015

Mirsad Gruda (born 13 May 1986) is a retired Albanian footballer who last played for Besëlidhja Lezhë in the Albanian First Division.
