= Endrit Braimllari =

Albanian politician

Endrit Braimllari is an Albanian politician, member of Socialist Movement for Integration (Albanian: Lëvizja Socialiste për Integrim, LSI), General Secretary of LSI and the Chairman of LSI of Tirana.

== Politics ==
Since December 2016 he has served as General Secretary of LSI, elected during the Party's National Convention. He is also the Chairman of Tirana, elected on the Convention of Tirana in February 2016.
