= Stevan Račić =

Serbian footballer (born 1984)

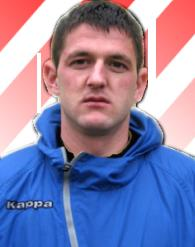

Personal information
- Date of birth: 17 January 1984 (age 42)
- Place of birth: Bačka Palanka, SR Serbia, SFR Yugoslavia (modern Serbia)
- Height: 1.93 m (6 ft 4 in)
- Position: Forward

Youth career
- 1995–2002: Hercegovac Gajdobra

Senior career*
Years	Team	Apps	(Gls)
2002–2004	Novi Sad	14	(1)
2003–2004	→ Šajkaš Kovilj (loan)	21	(8)
2004	ČSK Čelarevo	6	(1)
2005	Glogonj	10	(3)
2005–2006	PSK Pančevo	29	(9)
2006–2007	Obilić	6	(0)
2007–2009	Javor Ivanjica	64	(16)
2009	Daejeon Citizen	13	(0)
2010	Javor Ivanjica	12	(3)
2010	Volyn Lutsk	4	(0)
2011	Persis Solo	18	(3)
2011	Jagodina	0	(0)
2012	Napredak Kruševac	14	(5)
2012–2013	Čelik Nikšić	37	(15)
2014	Javor Ivanjica	11	(1)
2014–2016	Partizani Tirana	58	(20)
2016	Trikala	1	(0)
2017	Pembroke Athleta	14	(6)
2017	OFK Bačka	5	(0)
2017–2018	Kamza	28	(8)
2018	ČSK Čelarevo	27	(0)
2019	Hercegovac Gajdobra	17	(0)
- * Club domestic league appearances and goals as of 2 December 2017

Stevan Račić (Serbian Cyrillic: Стеван Рачић; born on 17 January 1984) is a Serbian former professional footballer who plays as a forward. He has played with several Eastern European and Asian clubs during his career.

== Career ==
Born in Bačka Palanka, Račić played in a number of minor and medium size clubs in Serbia before arriving in Ivanjica in January 2006 to play with local club FK Javor Ivanjica, having won with them promotion to the Serbian SuperLiga in 2008. After having played his first season in the top league, he received a proposal from South Korean club Daejeon Citizen F.C. to move to the K-League in summer of 2009. After playing the rest of the season in the far-east, in January 2010 he returned to his previous club, FK Javor, where he will play the rest of the 2009-10 season, and help them reach a European spot in the SuperLiga.

During 2011 he was playing with Liga Primer Indonesia club Solo FC before returning in summer 2011 to Serbia to play with SuperLiga club FK Jagodina.

=== Čelik Nikšić ===
After one season playing in the Serbian First League, he moved to Montenegrin First League team FK Čelik Nikšić. On 26 August 2012, Račić scored the fastest goal in the history of the Montenegrin First League against Mladost Podgorica only 12.25 seconds into the game's duration.

=== Partizani Tirana ===
In June 2014, Račić joined Albanian side Partizani Tirana where he signed a contract until the end of the season. During his presentation, Račić said that he had offers from Montenegro, but he chose Albania as his next destination for his career. After summer transfer window was closed, Partizani had made 32 transferts, a record in Albanian football.

==== 2014–15 season ====
On 24 August 2014, Račić made his Partizani Tirana debut in the opening match of 2014–15 Albanian Superliga against Laçi, where he scored the only goal of his team in a 1–1 draw. On 11 September 2014, he won a 90th-minute penalty kick against title rivals Skënderbeu Korçë that successfully converted by Emiljano Vila. Thanks to that, Partizani was able to win 1–0 at Qemal Stafa Stadium to receive the first win of the season after a draw against Laçi and a loss against Apolonia Fier.

On 14 September, Račić scored his second goal of the season, an 88th-minute free kick, to help Partizani prevail 0–1 against Kukësi at Zeqir Ymeri Stadium. Five days later, in the 4th week match against Teuta Durrës, Račić scored his third league goal and also set-up the Astrit Fazliu goal in an eventual 2–0 home win. That was the club's third consecutive league win. Six days later, Račić played in Tirana derby I against fierce local rivals Tirana which ended in a goalless draw. At the end of the month, Račić was named Albanian Superliga Player of the Month for September.

He continued with his solid appearances by scoring the only goal in the 9th league match against Elbasani, where he also won a penalty-kick, missed by Emiljano Vila. He ended the first phrase of the league with four goals in nine appearances, with Partizani who finished it with 18 points, tied with Tirana on top. After the match, asked for insultsis of fans against his country Serbia, Račić said: "I felt a little bad, but I know they were not against me. They are the best fans in Albanian Superliga and they have always supported us, like when we play at home, and where we play away."

==== 2015–16 season ====
On 15 June 2015, Račić agreed a contract extension with Partizani Tirana, with the new deal expiring on 30 June 2016. On 14 March of the following year, in the match against the league contenders of Skënderbeu Korçë, Račić scored the opening goal in the 20th minute, and also missed a penalty-kick in the second half, in an eventual 1–1 home draw as the "Demat e kuq" missed the opportunity to reduce the gap against them in the title race. He was, however, praised for his performance during the match.

=== Bačka ===
In July 2017, Račić completed a transfer to Serbian SuperLiga side OFK Bačka. He started the season on 22 July by playing the first half of the 2–1 away loss to Spartak Subotica in the first championship match. After five matches without scoring, Račić terminated his contract in order to return to Albania where he was a target of several top flight clubs.

=== Kamza ===
On 1 September 2017, Račić returned to Albania by signing a one-year contract with newly promoted top flight side Kamza. He made his competitive debut with the team 8 days later in the opening match against Kukësi which finished in a 1–0 away loss. He opened his scoring account on 13 September by netting in the 0–2 win over Iliria Fushë-Krujë in the first leg of 2017–18 Albanian Cup. Kamza eventually progressed to the next round by winning 7–1 on aggregate. His first score-sheet contributions in league came on matchday 4 where he netted a penalty kick against Teuta Durrës to rescue his team a point. Eleven days later against Luftëtari Gjirokastër, Račić scored a brace, including a last-minute penalty, to give Kamza their first league win. He won the penalty after he was punched in the stomach by Luftëtari's goalkeeper Festim Miraka, who received a red card.

On 2 December, in the match against Teuta Durrës, Račić scored the lone goal of the match, a volley from outside the zone which past goalkeeper and put Kamza temporarily on second place for the first time.

== Career statistics ==
As of 2 December 2017

Appearances and goals by club, season and competition
Club	Season	League			Cup		Europa		Total	
Club	Season	Division	Apps	Goals	Apps	Goals	Apps	Goals	Apps	Goals
Obilić	2006–07	Serbian First League	6	0	0	0	—		6	0
Javor Ivanjica	2007–08	Serbian First League	29	6	0	0	—		29	6
Javor Ivanjica	2008–09	Serbian SuperLiga	23	8	0	0	—		23	8
Javor Ivanjica	Total		52	14	0	0	—		52	14
Daejeon Citizen	2009–10	K League Classic	13	0	0	0	—		13	0
Javor Ivanjica	2009–10	Serbian SuperLiga	12	3	0	0	—		12	3
Volyn Lutsk	2010–11	Ukrainian Premier League	4	0	0	0	—		4	0
Persis Solo	2011	Liga Primer Indonesia			0	0	—			
Jagodina	2011–12	Serbian SuperLiga	0	0	0	0	—		0	0
Napredak Kruševac	2011–12	Serbian First League	14	5	0	0	—		14	5
Čelik Nikšić	2012–13	Montenegrin First League	27	12	3	0	—		30	12
Čelik Nikšić	2013–14	Montenegrin First League	10	3	1	0	2 (Note: Appearance(s) in UEFA Europa League)	0	13	3
Čelik Nikšić	Total		37	15	4	0	2	0	43	15
Javor Ivanjica	2013–14	Serbian SuperLiga	11	1	0	0	—		11	1
Partizani Tirana	2014–15	Albanian Superliga	33	14	1	0	—		34	14
Partizani Tirana	2015–16	Albanian Superliga	25	6	4	1	2	0	31	7
Partizani Tirana	Total		58	20	5	1	2	0	65	21
Trikala	2016–17	Football League Greece	1	0	0	0	—		1	0
Pembroke Athleta	2016–17	Maltese Premier League	14	6	2	2	—		16	8
OFK Bačka	2017–18	Serbian SuperLiga	5	0	0	0	—		5	0
Kamza	2017–18	Albanian Superliga	28	8	3	1	—		31	9
Career total			255	72	14	4	4	0	273	76

== Honours ==
Čelik Nikšić

- Montenegrin Cup: Runner-up 2012–13

Individual=

- Albanian Superliga Player of the Month: September 2014
