= Dashamir Xhika =

Albanian footballer (born 1989)

Personal information
- Date of birth: 23 May 1989 (age 37)
- Place of birth: Tirana, Albania
- Height: 1.87 m (6 ft 2 in)
- Position: Goalkeeper

Team information
- Current team: Erzeni
- Number: 12

Youth career
- Partizani Tirana

Senior career*
Years	Team	Apps	(Gls)
2006–2010	Partizani Tirana	26	(0)
2011–2013	Besëlidhja	56	(2)
2013–2014	Tërbuni	28	(0)
2014–2019	Partizani Tirana	23	(0)
2019–2022	Kukësi	54	(0)
2022–	Erzeni	38	(0)
- * Club domestic league appearances and goals as of 1 June 2024

Dashamir Xhika (born 23 May 1989) is an Albanian professional footballer who plays as a goalkeeper for Erzeni in the Albanian Superliga.

== Club career ==
=== Besëlidhja Lezhë ===
During the 2011–12 season with Besëlidhja in the Albanian First Division, Xhika was distinguished for his performances, conceding only 15 goals in 28 league appearances, also scoring twice for himself, becoming one of few Albanian goalkeepers to do that. Xhika's first goal of the season came from a penalty kick and was the only goal of the match against Ada, giving his team three important points in their bid to achieve promotion to the Albanian Superliga. His second goal of the season came again from a penalty kick, this time in a 2–0 home win against Burreli.

Besëlidhja ended the season in the fifth position, securing a place in the play-off round. On 19 May 2012, in the play-off round, the team encountered Tomori at Qemal Stafa Stadium where the regular and extra time finished in a goalless draw, but Besëlidhja was eventually eliminated in the penalty shootouts; Xhika successfully converted his penalty shootout attempt.

Xhika retained his status as the number one goalkeeper also for the next season, making 27 league appearances out of 30. On 24 November 2012, during the clash against Dinamo Tirana, Xhika received a straight red-card in the 83rd minute, levelling the team's on the field, in an eventually 1–0 away defeat. Besëlidhja's season was characterized by the negative results, which led the team to the relegation in the Albanian Second Division, which forced Xhika to terminate his cooperating with the club. Xhika himself expressed his sadness for the club's season, citing that "This year Besëlidhja did not have the echoes of the past two seasons, where it was the favourite team to achieve promotion in Albanian Superliga".

=== Tërbuni Pukë ===
In August 2013, Xhika signed with fellow Albanian First Division side Tërbuni, whose main goal was to achieve promotion to Albanian Superliga for the first time in history. He made his official debut with the team on 31 August in the team's opening league match of 2013–14 season, a 2–1 away defeat to Elbasani. He was the team's starting goalkeeper during the whole season, collecting 28 league appearances as Tërbuni managed to win the promotion to Albanian Superliga for the first time in its history. Xhika himself was praised for his individual performances throughout the season. Following the end of the season, Xhika announced his departure from the club to return to his first club Partizani.

=== Partizani Tirana ===
Following the end of 2013–14 season, Xhika left Tërbuni to return in his boyhood club Partizani after more than three years absence. He was assigned the squad number 1 and during the 2014–15 season he served as a back-up for the first-choice keeper Alban Hoxha. Due to Hoxha's issue family problems, Xhika made his Albanian Superliga return debut in an away match against Skënderbeu, but it was not a match to remember as he was red-carded in the 25th minute for a foul on Peter Olayinka; Partizani was defeated 3–0, losing the first place in the process.

Despite being used briefly in league, Xhika was the team's starting goalkeeper in Albanian Cup, appearing in both legs against Iliria in the first round, keeping a clean-sheet in the first match. Partizani eventually qualified to the next round with the aggregate 5–1. He had to wait until 31 January of the following year to make his second league appearance of the season, when he played the entire match against Apolonia, keeping a clean sheet in a 2–0 win away. In the last three league matches in May, Xhika was used as a starter, keeping clean sheets against Flamurtari, Vllaznia and Elbasani. He finished his first return season with Partizani by making nine appearances between league and cup; in league, Xhika did not concede a single goal during his 385 minutes of playing time. By finish third in the league, Partizani Tirana gained to right to play in European competitions for the first time after seven years.

Xhika continued to be the Alban Hoxha's back-up even for the 2015–16 season. On 2 July 2015, in the first leg of 2015–16 UEFA Europa League first qualifying round against Strømsgodset, Xhika made his European debut by entering in the field in the 30th minute due to an injury of Hoxha, making several good saves, but nevertheless Partizani lost the match 3–1. In the returning leg at home, Xhika was unused substitute as Partizani suffered another defeated and was eventually eliminated from the competition with the aggregate 4–1.

Xhika made his first league appearance of the season on 1 November 2015 by playing the last eight minutes of the 1–0 away win against Teuta, replacing Hoxha following a head injury. In the next match against Laçi at Elbasan Arena, Xhika was beaten for the first time in league by Olsi Gocaj in the 7th minute of the match; he set a new personal best record with 400 consecutive minutes without conceding a goal in Albanian Superliga. On 25 April of the following year, in the decisive match against Kukësi, Hoxha was given a straight red card after giving away a penalty. Xhika came on as a substitute to replace him and saved the penalty taken by Izair Emini. The game ended in a 1–0 away win for Partizani thanks to Xhevahir Sukaj last-minute winner.

Xhika started on goal in the opening match of 2017–18 Albanian Superliga versus Laçi, making a howler which resulted in Laçi's first goal scored by Kallaku in an eventual 0–2 loss.

=== Kukësi ===
Ahead of the 2019–20 season, Xhika joined FK Kukësi.

== Career statistics ==
As of 10 September 2017

Club statistics
Club	Season	League			Cup		Europe		Other (Note: Including other competitions, such as Albanian Supercup and Albanian Superliga play-offs)		Total	
Club	Season	Division	Apps	Goals	Apps	Goals	Apps	Goals	Apps	Goals	Apps	Goals
Partizani	2008–09	Albanian Superliga	2	0	0	0	0	0	—		2	0
Partizani	2009–10	Albanian First Division	5	0	1	0	—		—		6	0
Partizani	2010–11	Albanian First Division	0	0	0	0	—		—		0	0
Partizani	Total		7	0	1	0	—		—		8	0
Besëlidhja	2010–11	Albanian First Division	1	0	0	0	—		1 (Note: All appearance(s) in Albanian Superliga play-off)	0	2	0
Besëlidhja	2011–12	Albanian First Division	28	2	0	0	—		1	0	29	2
Besëlidhja	2012–13	Albanian First Division	27	0	1	0	—		—		28	0
Besëlidhja	Total		56	2	1	0	—		2	0	59	2
Tërbuni	2013–14	Albanian First Division	28	0	0	0	—		—		28	0
Tërbuni	Total		28	0	0	0	—		—		28	0
Partizani	2014–15	Albanian Superliga	5	0	4	0	—		—		9	0
Partizani	2015–16	Albanian Superliga	8	0	3	0	1 (Note: All appearance(s) in UEFA Europa League)	0	—		12	0
Partizani	2016–17	Albanian Superliga	2	0	3	0	0	0	—		5	0
Partizani	2017–18	Albanian Superliga	1	0	2	0	0	0	—		3	0
Partizani	Total		16	0	12	0	1	0	—		29	0
Career total			107	2	14	0	1	0	2	0	124	2
