= Rafael Magalhães =

Brazilian footballer

Personal information
- Full name: Rafael Leandro Magalhães
- Date of birth: 6 February 1986 (age 40)
- Place of birth: Pirajuí, São Paulo Brazil
- Height: 1.84 m (6 ft 0 in)
- Position: Striker

Team information
- Current team: União Barbarense

Senior career*
| Years | Team | Apps | (Gls) |
| 2007–2010 | Santo André | | |
| 2007–2008 | → São Bernardo (loan) | | |
| 2008–2009 | → Corinthians Alagoano (loan) | | |
| 2009 | → Hammarby IF (loan) | 11 | (1) |
| 2010 | Operário Ferroviário | | |
| 2011 | Ljungskile | 8 | (0) |
| 2011 | Husqvarna | 12 | (3) |
| 2012 | Juventus | 13 | (2) |
| 2012 | Vila Nova | 2 | (0) |
| 2013 | Juventus | 15 | (3) |
| 2013 | Piracicaba | | |
| 2014 | Rio Preto | 1 | (0) |
| 2014 | Catanduvense | 7 | (0) |
| 2014 | Teuta Durrës | 10 | (2) |
| 2015 | Confiança | 13 | (4) |
| 2016 | Catanduvense | 0 | (0) |
| 2016 | URT | 8 | (1) |
| 2017 | Jacuipense | 2 | (0) |
| 2017 | Matonense | 9 | (1) |
| 2018– | União Barbarense | 0 | (0) |
- * Club domestic league appearances and goals as of 2 April 2017

Rafael Leandro Magalhães (born 6 February 1986) is a Brazilian professional footballer who plays as a striker for União Barbarense in the Campeonato Paulista Série A2.

== Honours ==
Confiança

- Campeonato Sergipano: 2015
