= Endrit Karameto =

Albanian footballer

Personal information
- Date of birth: 13 December 1995 (age 30)
- Place of birth: Tirana, Albania
- Height: 1.73 m (5 ft 8 in)
- Position: Right back

Youth career
- 2002–2014: Tirana

Senior career*
Years	Team	Apps	(Gls)
2014–2017	Partizani	0	(0)
- * Club domestic league appearances and goals

Endrit Karameto (born 13 December 1995) is an Albanian former professional footballer. He retired from his career due to persistent knee issues.
