= Armand Pasha =

Albanian footballer

Personal information
- Full name: Armand Pasha
- Date of birth: 17 January 1991 (age 35)
- Place of birth: Durrës, Albania
- Position: Midfielder

Team information
- Current team: Iliria
- Number: 15

Youth career
- –2008: Teuta Durrës

Senior career*
| Years | Team | Apps | (Gls) |
| 2008–2009 | Teuta | 0 | (0) |
| 2008–2009 | → Luz i Vogël (loan) | | |
| 2009–2011 | Laçi | 3 | (0) |
| 2011–2012 | Apolonia | 8 | (0) |
| 2012 | Luz i Vogël | | |
| 2012–2014 | Sukthi | | |
| 2014–2015 | Iliria | 12 | (1) |
| 2015–2017 | Erzeni | 56 | (33) |
| 2018 | Besa | 13 | (4) |
| 2018 | Besëlidhja | 4 | (2) |
| 2019 | Egnatia | 8 | (0) |
| 2019– | Iliria | 5 | (1) |

International career
| 2011 | Albania U-21 | 2 | (0) |
- * Club domestic league appearances and goals as of 12 December 2019

Armand Pasha (born 17 January 1991) is an Albanian professional footballer who currently plays for Albanian First Division side Iliria Fushë-Krujë as a midfielder.

== Club career ==
A product of the Teuta Durrës academy, Pasha was loaned out to newly formed side Luz i Vogël for the 2008–09 season before leaving Teuta to join KF Laçi in 2009. After just three league appearances in two seasons for KF Laçi he joined Apolonia Fier.
