= Ari Djepaxhia =

Albanian footballer

Personal information
- Full name: Ari Djepaxhia
- Date of birth: 4 October 1991 (age 35)
- Place of birth: Shkodër, Albania
- Position: Midfielder

Team information
- Current team: Burreli

Youth career
- –2009: Vllaznia

Senior career*
Years	Team	Apps	(Gls)
2009–2012	Vllaznia	17	(0)
2012–2013	Partizani	26	(0)
2013–2014	Ada	4	(0)
2014–2015	Veleçiku	16	(2)
2015–2016	Besëlidhja	13	(1)
2017–2018	Vllaznia	18	(1)
2019	Burreli	6	(0)
- * Club domestic league appearances and goals as of 18:21, 12 April 2021 (UTC)

Ari Djepaxhia (born 4 October 1991) is an Albanian footballer who currently plays as a midfielder.

== Club career ==
=== Vllaznia ===
Djepaxhia made his debut for Vllaznia Shkodër in a home game against Kastrioti Krujë on 13 December 2009. He started the game in midfield but his first professional game was short lived because he was sent off following a foul on Olsi Gocaj as the last man.

He joined coach Elvis Plori at Burreli in January 2019.

=== Career stats ===
Club performance			League		Cup		Continental		Total	
Season	Club	League	Apps	Goals	Apps	Goals	Apps	Goals	Apps	Goals
Albania			League		Albanian Cup		Europe		Total	
2009–10	Vllaznia Shkodër	Albanian Superliga	6	0	1	0	0	0	7	0
2010–11	Vllaznia Shkodër	Albanian Superliga	7	0	1	0	–		8	0
2011–12	Vllaznia Shkodër	Albanian Superliga	1	0	0	0	0	0	1	0
