= Ignat Dishliev =

Bulgarian footballer

Personal information
- Full name: Ignat Iliev Dishliev
- Date of birth: 8 June 1987 (age 39)
- Place of birth: Plovdiv, Bulgaria
- Height: 1.83 m (6 ft 0 in)
- Position: Centre back

Youth career
- FC Apoli-99

Senior career*
| Years | Team | Apps | (Gls) |
| 2006–2008 | Lokomotiv Plovdiv | 5 | (0) |
| 2008–2011 | Brestnik 1948 | 50 | (2) |
| 2011–2012 | Lyubimets 2007 | 24 | (3) |
| 2012–2014 | Beroe Stara Zagora | 12 | (0) |
| 2014 | Partizani Tirana | 4 | (0) |
| 2015–2016 | Lokomotiv Plovdiv | 3 | (0) |
- * Club domestic league appearances and goals as of 29 May 2016

Ignat Dishliev (Bulgarian: Игнат Дишлиев; born 8 July 1987 in Plovdiv) is a Bulgarian footballer, who plays as a defender.

== Honours ==
=== Club ===
Beroe

- Bulgarian Cup (1): 2013
- Bulgarian Supercup (1): 2013
