= Klajdi Broshka =

Albanian professional football player

Personal information
- Full name: Klajdi Broshka
- Date of birth: 18 November 1993 (age 32)
- Place of birth: Elbasan, Albania
- Position: Defender

Team information
- Current team: KS Lushnja

Youth career
- 2010–2012: Elbasani

Senior career*
Years	Team	Apps	(Gls)
2011–2012	Elbasani	1	(0)
2012–2013	Turbina	18	(1)
2013–2018	Apolonia	129	(4)
2018–2019	Egnatia	25	(0)
2019–	Lushnja		
- * Club domestic league appearances and goals as of 19:08, 13 October 2019 (UTC)

Klajdi Broshka (born 18 November 1993 in Elbasan) is an Albanian professional football player who currently plays for AF Elbasani in the Albanian First Division.

== Career ==
Broshka joined KS Lushnja ahead of the 2019–20 season.
