= Endri Muçmata =

Albanian footballer

Personal information
- Full name: Endri Muçmata
- Date of birth: 21 June 1996 (age 30)
- Place of birth: Kukës, Albania
- Position: Midfielder

Youth career
- 2012–2013: Dinamo Tirana
- 2013–2014: Kukësi

Senior career*
Years	Team	Apps	(Gls)
2013–2015	Kukësi	4	(0)
2014	→ Sopoti (loan)	3	(0)
2015	Teuta Durrës	0	(0)
2016	Laçi	2	(0)
2016–2018	Kastrioti	15	(1)
- * Club domestic league appearances and goals as of 6 February 2018

Endri Muçmata (born 21 June 1996 in Kukës) is an Albanian professional footballer who most recently played for KS Kastrioti in the Albanian First Division.
