= Liridon Osmanaj =

Slovenian footballer

Personal information
- Full name: Liridon Osmanaj
- Date of birth: 4 January 1992 (age 34)
- Place of birth: Maribor, Slovenia
- Height: 1.77 m (5 ft 10 in)
- Position: Forward

Youth career
- –2011: Maribor

Senior career*
Years	Team	Apps	(Gls)
2011	Maribor	0	(0)
2011–2013	Domžale	34	(5)
2013	Aluminij	8	(1)
2014	SC Kalsdorf II	1	(0)
2014	Partizani Tirana	13	(1)
2015	Widzew Łódź	9	(2)
2015–2017	Radomlje	25	(9)
2017	Al-Shamal		
2017–2018	Nafta 1903	16	(0)
2018–2019	Concordia Basel		
2019–2020	SC Dornach		
2020–2021	FC Dardania		
2021–2022	FC Laufen		

International career
2008	Slovenia U16	2	(0)
2010	Slovenia U19	2	(0)
2011–2012	Slovenia U20	4	(0)
- * Club domestic league appearances and goals

Liridon Osmanaj (born 4 January 1992) is a Slovenian former professional footballer who played as a forward. As a youngster, he was a prolific goalscorer with Maribor's youth team and attracted the interest of Chelsea, where he went on trial as a teenager.

== Club career ==
Osmanaj went on trial with Albanian Superliga club Partizani Tirana on 14 August 2014, which proved to be a successful one as he was offered a contract with the club and he signed a week later.

In March 2025, he joined Widzew Łódź in the Polish I liga.

On 10 January 2017, he joined Al-Shamal Sports Club in Qatar.
