= Jefferson Lopes (footballer) =

Brazilian footballer

Personal information
- Full name: Jefferson Francisco Marques Lopes
- Date of birth: 27 October 1989 (age 37)
- Place of birth: São Paulo, Brazil
- Height: 1.80 m (5 ft 11 in)
- Position: Defensive midfielder

Team information
- Current team: Gjilani
- Number: 22

Youth career
- Portuguesa

Senior career*
Years	Team	Apps	(Gls)
2009–2010	Portuguesa	4	(0)
2010–2011	Ferroviário	23	(0)
2011–2012	Sampaio Corrêa	10	(0)
2012–2013	Portuguesa Santista	18	(1)
2013–2014	Misto	24	(2)
2014–2018	Kukesi	31	(1)
2018–2019	Gjilani	28	(1)
- * Club domestic league appearances and goals

Jefferson Francisco Marques Lopes (Albanian: Fransisko Xheferson); born 17 October 1989), commonly known as Jefferson, is a Brazilian former footballer who played as a defensive midfielder.
