= Emiliano Veliaj =

Albanian footballer

Personal information
- Full name: Emiliano Velaj
- Date of birth: 9 February 1985 (age 41)
- Place of birth: Berat, Albania
- Height: 1.85 m (6 ft 1 in)
- Position: Midfielder

Youth career
- 2000–2001: Tomori Berat

Senior career*
Years	Team	Apps	(Gls)
2001–2005	Tomori Berat	33	(3)
2005–2009	Besa	102	(15)
2009–2010	Laçi	32	(3)
2010–2011	Shkumbini	30	(2)
2011–2013	Teuta	40	(2)
2013–2016	Laçi	92	(7)
2016	Korabi	13	(0)
2017	Tomori Berat	10	(0)
2017–2018	Korabi	21	(4)
2018	Vora	11	(0)
2019	Burreli	8	(0)
2019	Luzi 2008	4	(0)

International career
2002–2003	Albania U19	6	(1)
2005–2006	Albania U21	7	(2)
2010–2012	Albania	2	(0)
- * Club domestic league appearances and goals

Emiliano Veliaj (born 9 February 1985) is a retired Albanian footballer who played as a midfielder. He was a member of the Albania national Team between 2010 and 2012, earning 2 full caps.

== Club career ==
=== Korabi Peshkopi ===
On 1 July 2016, Veliaj agreed personal terms and signed a one-year contract with newly promoted Albanian Superliga side Korabi Peshkopi for an undisclosed fee. In a press conference later that month, Veliaj stated that Korabi made the best offer for him, despite interest from several other Albanian clubs. He made his debut for the club on 7 September in the opening league match of 2016–17 season against his former team Laçi, playing full-90 minutes in a goalless draw. He also played in the two-legged match against Kamza in the first round of Albanian Cup, as Korabi was eliminated with the aggregate 3–1. During the first part of the season, Veliaj made 13 league appearances, in addition 2 in cup, failing to score in the process, as Korabi struggled for results, finishing it in the penultimate spot.

=== Tomori Berat ===
On 26 January 2017, Veliaj returned to his boyhood club Tomori Berat for the first time in 12 years. He was immediately placed in the starting lineup, making his return debut on 3 February in the matchday 14 against Pogradeci. During the second part of 2016–17 season, Veliaj played 10 matches without scoring and left the team following the end of the season.

=== Korabi Peshkopi return ===
On 30 August 2017, after training for a while with Egnatia, Veliaj returned to Korabi Peshkopi this time in Albanian First Division as a free transfer.

== International career ==
Veliaj made his senior debut on 2 June 2010 by appearing in the last minutes of the friendly against Andorra, which ended in a 1–0 home win for Albania. After two years, he was called up again by the new coach Gianni De Biasi for the friendlies against Qatar and Iran in May 2012. He made another senior appearance, this time against Iran at the İnönü Stadium, Istanbul, Turkey, entering in the last moments in a 1–0 win.

== Honours ==
Besa Kavajë

- Albanian Cup: 2006–07

Laçi

- Albanian Cup: 2014–15
- Albanian Supercup: 2015
