= Mentor Mazrekaj =

Kosovan professional footballer (born 1989)

Personal information
- Date of birth: 8 February 1989 (age 37)
- Place of birth: Pristina, SFR Yugoslavia
- Height: 1.87 m (6 ft 2 in)
- Position: Winger

Youth career
- 2004–2008: Prishtina

Senior career*
Years	Team	Apps	(Gls)
2008–2013	Prishtina	108	(17)
2013	→ Partizani Tirana (loan)	14	(0)
2013–2017	Partizani Tirana	79	(12)
2017–2018	Prishtina	9	(1)
2018–2019	Ferizaj	4	(1)
2019	Fortuna Oslo	0	(0)
2019	2 Korriku	9	(2)
2019	Llapi	3	(0)
2020–2023	Laçi	97	(12)
2023–2024	Struga	26	(2)
2024–2025	Besa Kavajë	12	(8)
2025–2026	Iliria Fushë-Krujë	12	(0)

International career
2026–	Albania (socca)	2	(0)
- * Club domestic league appearances and goals

Mentor Xhemajl Mazrekaj (born 8 February 1989) is a professional footballer who last played as a winger for Albanian club Iliria Fushë-Krujë. Born in Kosovo under SFR Yugoslavia, he plays for the Albania national team in socca.

== Club career ==
=== Prishtina ===
==== Loan at Partizani ====
On 31 July 2013, Mazrekaj was loaned for six months to Kategoria Superiore side Partizani, with an option to extend the deal for a further year. One month later, he made his debut in a 0–2 away win against Kastrioti after being named in the starting line-up.

=== Return to Partizani ===
On 13 December 2013, Mazrekaj become a permanent player of Partizani after agreeing to a three-year deal. Two days later, he played the first game as permanent player against Besa after being named in the starting line-up.

=== Return to Prishtina ===
On 25 July 2017, Mazrekaj returned to Football Superleague of Kosovo club Prishtina, and received squad number 10. On 20 August 2017, he made his debut in a 0–1 home defeat against Drita after being named in the starting line-up.

=== Ferizaj ===
On 6 September 2018, Mazrekaj joined Football Superleague of Kosovo side Ferizaj. Nine days later, he made his debut in a 0–0 away draw over his former club Prishtina after coming on as a substitute.

=== Fortuna Oslo and 2 Korriku ===
In January 2019, Mazrekaj signed with Norwegian club Fortuna Oslo, but he resigned again at the end of the month. He then signed on 20 February with First Football League of Kosovo club 2 Korriku for the remainder of the season. On 2 March 2019, Mazrekaj made his debut in a league match against Arbëria after being named in the starting line-up and scored his side's first goal during a 3–0 home win.

=== Llapi ===
On 12 August 2019, Mazrekaj signed a two-year contract with Football Superleague of Kosovo club Llapi. Nineteen days later, he made his debut in a 0–0 home draw against Ballkani after coming on as a substitute at 75th minute in place of Mergim Pefqeli.

=== Laçi ===
On 19 August 2020, Mazrekaj joined Kategoria Superiore side Laçi. Nine days later, he made his debut with Laçi in the 2020–21 UEFA Europa League first qualifying round match against the Azerbaijani side Keşla after coming on as a substitute at 120th minute in place of Teco.

=== Besa ===
On 5 June 2024, Mazrekaj officially joined Besa in the Kategoria e Parë, returning to Albania after one year. He made his debut in season opener, a 2–0 home win against Valbona. In the next game, Mazrekaj scored directly from a corner kick to give his team all three points in the away match against Korabi. On 16 September, he scored his first career hat-trick in a 3–0 win over Kastrioti.
