= Elton Doku =

Albanian footballer

Personal information
- Full name: Elton Doku
- Date of birth: 1 October 1986 (age 40)
- Place of birth: Krujë, Albania
- Position: Defender

Youth career
- –2003: Partizani

Senior career*
Years	Team	Apps	(Gls)
2003–2005	Partizani	8	(0)
2005–2006	Erzeni		
2007	Partizani	3	(0)
2007	Luftëtari		(1)
2007–2008	Erzeni		(1)
2008–2010	Skënderbeu	50	(2)
2010–2013	Laçi	65	(3)
2013–2014	Kastrioti	25	(2)
2014	Kukësi	0	(0)
2014–2015	Laçi	37	(2)
2016–2017	Kastrioti	31	(1)
- * Club domestic league appearances and goals as of 2019

Elton Doku (born 1 October 1986 in Krujë) is an Albanian footballer who most recently played as a defender for hometown club Kastrioti in the Albanian Superliga.

== Honours ==
KF Laçi

- Albanian Cup (1): 2014–15
