= Kamëz Stadium =

Albanian sports stadium

- Fuat Toptani Stadium
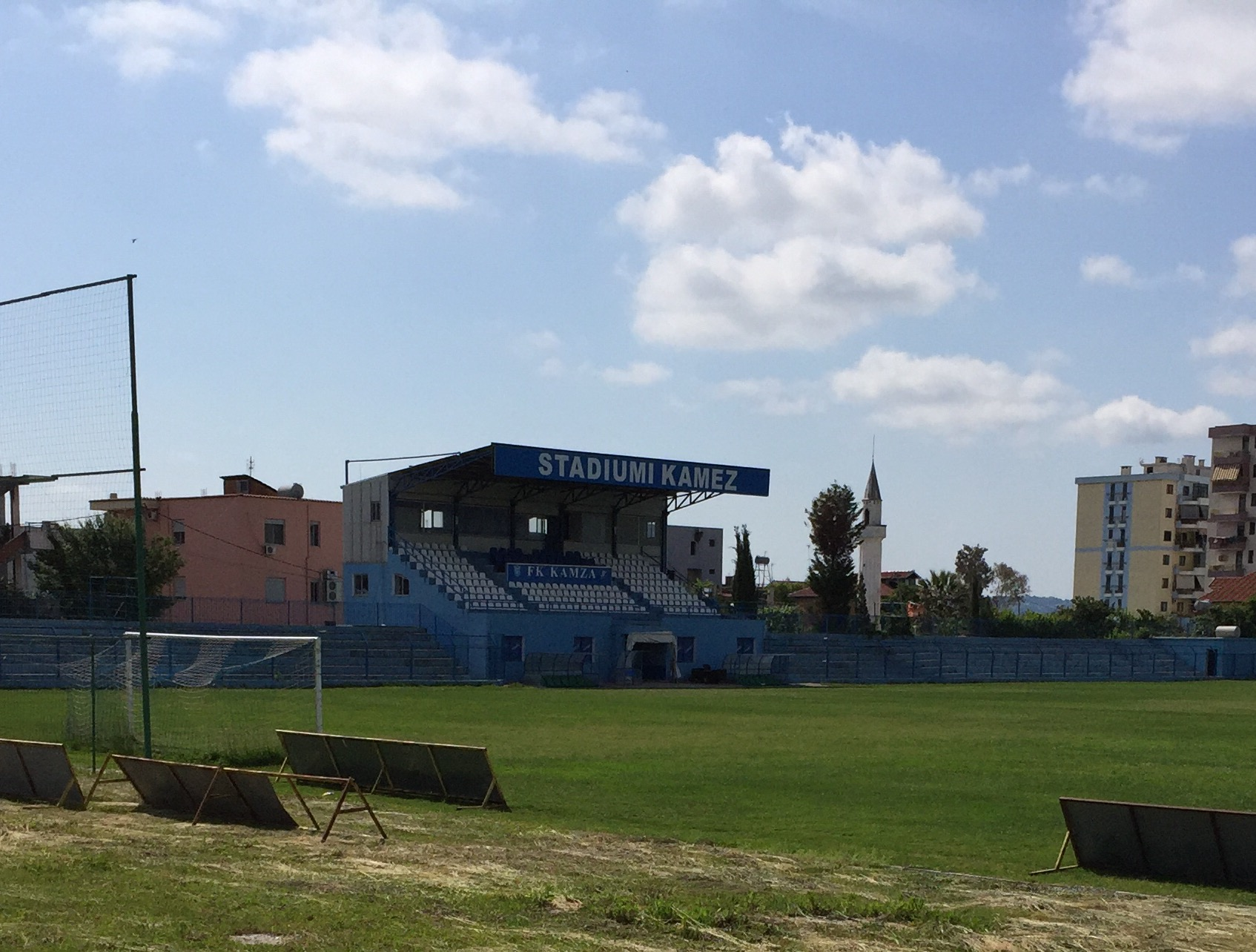
- Interactive map of Kamëz Stadium
- Former names: Fusha Sportivë Kamëz (2008–2010)
- Address: Kamëz, Albania
- Coordinates: 41°23′5″N 19°45′41″E
- Owner: Municipality of Kamëz
- Operator: Municipality of Kamëz
- Capacity: 3,400
- Surface: Grass
- Field size: 101 by 65 metres (110 yd × 71 yd)

Construction
- Built: 2007–2008
- Opened: 2008
- Renovated: 2011, 2012–2013, 2015, 2016
- Years active: 2008-present

Tenant

The Kamëz Stadium is a sports stadium in Kamëz, Tirana County, Albania. The ground is owned and managed by the Municipality of Kamëz, and it is the home ground of Kamza 05 and Kastrioti. Stadium capacity is 3,400 with 1,698 seating places.

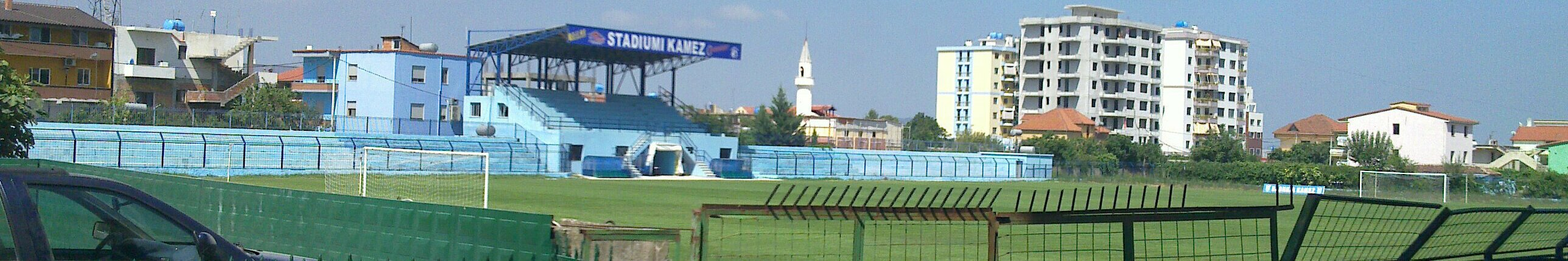
A panoramic photo of the Kamëz Stadium taken in 2010.

== See also ==
- List of Albanian football stadia by capacity
- List of stadiums in Albania
