= Argjend Mustafa =

Kosovar-Albanian footballer

Personal information
- Date of birth: 22 October 1993 (age 33)
- Place of birth: Mušutište, FR Yugoslavia
- Height: 1.88 m (6 ft 2 in)
- Position: Midfielder

Senior career*
Years	Team	Apps	(Gls)
2013–2014	Trepça	19	(1)
2014–2016	Trepça '89	59	(4)
2016	Skënderbeu	9	(0)
2017–2018	Trepça '89	7	(0)
2018–2019	Prishtina	21	(0)
2019–2020	Llapi	11	(0)
- * Club domestic league appearances and goals

Argjend Mustafa (born 22 October 1993) is a Kosovar-Albanian former footballer.

== Club career ==
He had a half season abroad with Skënderbeu in the Albanian Superliga.

== Career statistics ==
=== Club ===
As of 24 November 2016

Club	Season	League			Cup (Note: Including cup competitions, such as Albanian Cup)		Continental (Note: Including continental competitions, such as UEFA Champions League and UEFA Europa League)		Other (Note: Including other competitions, such as Albanian Supercup)		Total	
Club	Season	Division	Apps	Goals	Apps	Goals	Apps	Goals	Apps	Goals	Apps	Goals
Trepça '89	2013–14	Kosovo Superleague	19	1	?	?	—		—		19	1
Trepça '89	Total		19	1	?	?	—		—		19	1
Trepça '89	2014–15	Kosovo Superleague	30	2	?	?	—		—		30	2
Trepça '89	2015–16	Kosovo Superleague	29	2	?	?	—		—		29	2
Trepça '89	Total		59	4	?	?	—		—		59	4
Skënderbeu Korçë	2016–17	Albanian Superliga	6	0	3	0	—		0	0	9	0
Skënderbeu Korçë	Total		6	0	3	0	—		0	0	9	0
Career total			84	4	3	0	0	0	0	0	87	4
