= 2010–11 KF Tirana season =

Tirana
2010–11 season
- Chairman: Refik Halili
- Manager: Nevil Dede (until 6 February 2010); Mišo Krstičević
- Ground: Selman Stërmasi Stadium
- Kategoria Superiore: 5th
- Albanian Cup: Winners
- Europa League: Second qualifying round
- Top goalscorer: Pero Pejić (11)
Home colours	Away colours

The 2010–11 season was Klubi i Futbollit Tirana's 72nd competitive season, 72nd consecutive season in the Kategoria Superiore, and 90th year in existence as a football club. Following the title win two seasons ago, KF Tirana added to their 23 titles to make it their record 24 title wins. KF Tirana played UEFA Europa League against Zalaegerszegi TE and FC Utrecht.

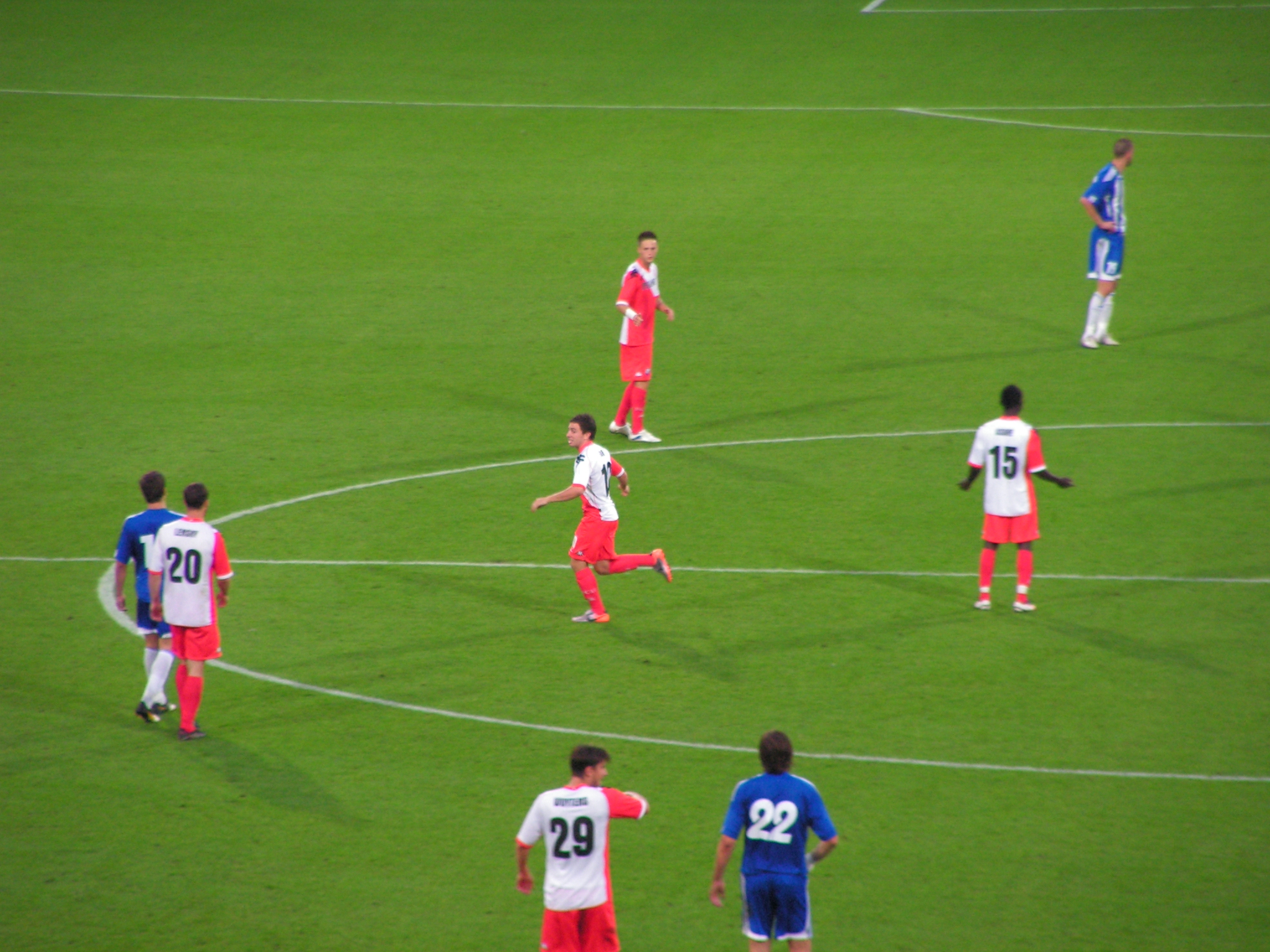
FC Utrecht - KF Tirana

== Background ==
=== Kit ===
- Supplier: Adidas
- Sponsor: --

=== Other information ===
President	Refik Halili
Ground (capacity and dimensions)	Selman Stërmasi stadium (12, 500 / 105m x 68m)

Source: Selman Stërmasi stadium

== Coaching staff ==
As of February 12, 2011

Position	Name
Head coach	Mišo Krstičević
Assistant coach	Luan Sengla
Goalkeeping coach	Astrit Nallbani
Technical director	Alban Tafaj
Club Secretary	Rauf Dimraj
Athletic coach	Rauf Dimraj
Physical Therapy	Ylli Mihali
Club Doctor	Eduart Gjika
Reporter	Adnan Hyka

== Players ==
=== 2010–11 squad ===
Note: Flags indicate national team as defined under FIFA eligibility rules; some limited exceptions apply. Players may hold more than one non-FIFA nationality.

No.	Pos.	Nation	Player
1	GK	ALB	Blendi Nallbani
2	DF	ALB	Elvis Sina
3	DF	ALB	Rezart Dabulla
4	MF	SRB	Ivan Gvozdenovic
5	DF	ALB	Entonio Pashaj
6	DF	ALB	Andi Lila
7	MF	ALB	Blerti Hajdari
8	MF	ALB	Sabien Lilaj
9	FW	ALB	Sebino Plaku
10	MF	ALB	Devi Muka (captain)
11	FW	ALB	Ergys Sorra
12	GK	ALB	Ilion Lika
13	MF	ALB	Erando Karabeci
14	FW	ALB	Oriand Abazaj
16	DF	ALB	Erjon Dushku
17	MF	ALB	Afrim Taku

No.	Pos.	Nation	Player
18	DF	ALB	Rrahman Hallaçi
19	DF	ALB	Tefik Osmani
20	FW	ALB	Alban Bushi
21	MF	KOS	Shpetim Babaj
22	FW	CRO	Pero Pejic
24	MF	ALB	Gerald Tusha
25	MF	ALB	Migen Metani
27	FW	ALB	Mario Morina
28	FW	BIH	Mladen Žižović
30	MF	ALB	Marvin Nallbani
31	GK	ALB	Enkel Dauti
—	FW	ALB	Enco Malindi
—	DF	ALB	Saimir Kasemi
—	DF	ALB	Eugen Shima
—	DF	ALB	Dorian Kërçiku
—	MF	ALB	Gentian Muça

=== Out on loan ===
Note: Flags indicate national team as defined under FIFA eligibility rules; some limited exceptions apply. Players may hold more than one non-FIFA nationality.

No.	Pos.	Nation	Player
24	DF	ALB	Mario Shehu (on loan to Kamza)
--	DF	ALB	Gentian Muça (on loan to Dinamo)
--	DF	ALB	Besian Celiku (on loan to Skënderbeu)
--	FW	ALB	Hendrit Ferra (on loan to Elbasani)
--	FW	ALB	Samet Gjoka (on loan to Partizani)
--	DF	ALB	Albi Çeliku (on loan to Lushnja)
--	DF	ALB	Tedi Baholli (on loan to KF Liria)

No.	Pos.	Nation	Player
--	GK	ALB	Eni Malaj (on loan to Turbina)
--	DF	ALB	Elio Rapo (on loan to Turbina)
--	DF	ALB	Redi Papinari (on loan to Turbina)
--	DF	ALB	Florenc Çaushi (on loan to Turbina)
--	DF	ALB	Klejdi Nela (on loan to Turbina)
--	GK	ALB	Ilir Ndoj (on loan to Partizani)
17	MF	ALB	Afrim Taku

=== International players ===
- (Albania) Blendi Nallbani
- (Albania) Rezart Dabulla
- (Albania) Andi Lila

- (Albania) Tefik Osmani
- (Albania) Elvis Sina
- (Albania) Julian Ahmataj

=== Foreign players ===
- (Croatia) Pero Pejic
- (Kosovo) Shpetim Babaj
- (Bosnia and Herzegovina) Mladen Žižović
- (Serbia) Ivan Gvozdenovic
- (Bosnia and Herzegovina) Mladen Žižović

== Competitions ==
=== Kategoria Superiore ===
==== League table ====
Pos	Team	Pld	W	D	L	GF	GA	GD	Pts	Qualification or relegation
3	Vllaznia	33	17	8	8	41	27	+14	59	Qualification for the Europa League first qualifying round
4	Laçi	33	14	5	14	44	44	0	47	
5	Tirana	33	11	11	11	42	31	+11	44	Qualification for the Europa League second qualifying round (Note: Tirana qualified for the Europa League second qualifying round by winning the 2010–11 Albanian Cup.)
6	Bylis	33	13	4	16	44	48	−4	43	
7	Teuta	33	11	9	13	38	40	−2	42	

Source: Albanian Football Association (in Albanian), Soccerway
Rules for classification: 1) points; 2) points in head-to-head matches; 3) goal difference in head-to-head matches; 4) goals scored in head-to-head matches; 5) total goal difference; 6) total goals scored; 7) draw

==== Results summary ====
Overall								Home						Away					
Pld	W	D	L	GF	GA	GD	Pts	W	D	L	GF	GA	GD	W	D	L	GF	GA	GD
33	11	11	11	43	29	+14	44	9	4	4	29	11	+18	2	7	7	14	18	−4

Last updated: June 2011.
Source: Competitive matches

==== Results by round ====
Round	1	2	3	4	5	6	7	8	9	10	11	12	13	14	15	16	17	18	19	20	21	22	23	24	25	26	27	28	29	30	31	32	33
Ground	A	A	H	A	H	A	H	A	H	A	H	H	H	A	H	A	H	A	H	A	H	A	H	A	H	A	H	H	A	H	A	H	A
Result	D	L	W	D	W	L	D	L	W	W	L	W	W	D	W	D	D	W	D	D	D	D	L	L	W	D	W	W	L	L	L	L	L
Position	7	8	8	7	4	6	6	8	5	4	5	4	4	5	4	4	5	4	4	4	4	4	4	6	5	5	5	4	4	4	4	5	5

Source: Competitive matches
A = Away; H = Home; W = Win; D = Draw; L = Loss

==== Matches ====
22 August 2010 1	Elbasani	1–1	Tirana	Elbasan
16:30 CET	Çapja (yellow card) 2' (yellow-red card) 63'; Ristevski 29'; Sadiku (yellow card) 65'	Report	Pejić (yellow card) 4'; Lila 65' (pen.) (yellow card) 65'	Stadium: Ruzhdi Bizhuta Stadium; Attendance: 6,000; Referee: Kreshnik Cjapi

27 August 2010 2	Flamurtari Vlorë	2–1	Tirana	Vlorë
16:00 CET	Roshi 20' (yellow card) 20'; Devolli (yellow card) 41'; Xhafaj 66'; Grami (yellow card) 80'	Report	Plaku 25'; Osmani (yellow card) 39'; Pejić (yellow card) 63'; Malindi (yellow card) 75'; Lila (yellow card) 88'	Stadium: Flamurtari Stadium; Attendance: 6,000; Referee: Edvin Hoxha

12 September 2010 3	Tirana	2–1	Bylis Ballsh	Tirana
17:00 CET	Silagailis (yellow card) 10'; Pejić 22', 45+2'; Hallaçi (yellow card) 90'	Report	Egbo (yellow card) 22'; Gega (yellow card) 22' (goal) 39'; Kule (yellow card) 43'	Stadium: Qemal Stafa Stadium; Attendance: 500; Referee: Bardhyl Pashaj

20 September 2010 4	Kastrioti Krujë	0–0	Tirana	Krujë
15:00 CET	Zora (yellow card) 16' (yellow-red card) 76'; Ragipović (yellow card) 19'; Djarmati (yellow card) 33'	Report	Sina (red card) 36'; Karabeci (yellow card) 54'	Stadium: Kastrioti Stadium; Attendance: 2,000; Referee: Remzi Sadiku

26 September 2010 5	Tirana	2–0	Laçi	Tirana
15:00 CET	Babaj (yellow card) 27'; Pejić 43'; Gvozdenović (yellow card) 66'; Lila (yellow card) 72'; Malindi 90+2'	Report	Mile (yellow card) 4'; Doku (red card) 52'; Kastrati (yellow card) 87'	Stadium: Selman Stërmasi Stadium; Attendance: 500; Referee: Elvis Peza

3 October 2010 6	Skënderbeu Korçë	2–1	Tirana	Korçë
13:30 CET	Shkëmbi (yellow card) 52'; Biskup 53' (yellow card) 78'; Dragusha (yellow card) 64'; Vrapi (yellow card) 75'; Sosa (yellow card) 90' (goal) 90+3'	Report	Muka 3' (yellow card) 63'; Gvozdenović (yellow card) 86'	Stadium: Skënderbeu Stadium; Attendance: 10,000; Referee: Lorenc Jemini

18 October 2010 7	Tirana	1–1	Dinamo Tirana	Tirana
17:00 CET	Lila (yellow card) 33'; Lilaj (yellow card) 48'; Osmani 56'; Muka (yellow card) 61'; Silagailis (yellow card) 71'	Report	Martinena 17'; Pisha (yellow card) 74'; Ambourouet (yellow card) 86'	Stadium: Qemal Stafa Stadium; Attendance: 3,000; Referee: Lorenc Jemini

25 October 2010 8	Besa Kavajë	2–1	Tirana	Kavajë
13:30 CET	Mihani 11' (yellow card) 40'; Poçi (yellow card) 15'; Cikalleshi 36'; Lazarevski (yellow card) 43'	Report	Dushku (red card) 9'; Osmani (yellow card) 59'; Lila 71' (yellow card) 80'; Lilaj (yellow card) 82'; Karabeci (yellow card) 86'	Stadium: Besa Stadium; Attendance: 3,000; Referee: Sokol Çekaj

31 October 2010 9	Tirana	2–0	Teuta Durrës	Tirana
14:00 CET	Pejić 3', 12'	Report		Stadium: Qemal Stafa Stadium; Attendance: 400; Referee: Kridens Meta

6 November 2010 10	Shkumbini Peqin	1–3	Tirana	Peqin
13:00 CET	Mujdragić (yellow card) 10'; Grishaj 17' (yellow card) 30'	Report	Lilaj (yellow card) 32'; Bushi (yellow card) 53'; Pejić 59'; Gvozdenović (yellow card) 67'; Žižović (yellow card) 71' (goal) 72'; Tusha 82'	Stadium: Shkumbini Stadium; Attendance: 3,500; Referee: Bardhyl Pashaj

14 November 2010 11	Tirana	0–2	Vllaznia Shkodër	Tirana
13:00 CET	Lila (yellow card) 54'; Osmani (yellow card) 65'; Sina (yellow card) 68'; Tusha (yellow card) 89'	Report	Vajushi 18' (yellow card) 56'; Sinani 31'; Gocaj (yellow card) 37'; Belisha (yellow card) 72'	Stadium: Qemal Stafa Stadium; Attendance: 1,000; Referee: Enea Jorgji

20 November 2010 12	Tirana	3–1	Elbasani	Tirana
13:00 CET	Pejić 35', 59'; Morina 90'	Report	Dalipi 61'; Çapja (yellow card) 66'	Stadium: Qemal Stafa Stadium; Attendance: 400; Referee: Erion Dobi

27 November 2010 13	Tirana	2–1	Flamurtari Vlorë	Tirana
16:00 CET	Muka (yellow card) 23'; Pejić 24'; Lila (yellow card) 35'; Lilaj (yellow card) 48'; Karabeci (yellow card) 81'; Plaku 90+1'	Report	Devolli (yellow card) 18'; Xhafaj 56'; Brahja (yellow card) 65'	Stadium: Qemal Stafa Stadium; Attendance: 2,000; Referee: Enea Jorgji

11 December 2010 14	Bylis Ballsh	1–1	Tirana	Ballsh
17:00 CET	Arbëri (yellow card) 28'; Popović 48' (yellow card) 65'; Xhafa (yellow card) 58'; Sulollari (yellow card) 63'; Besha (yellow card) 78'	Report	Lilaj (yellow card) 31' (goal) 90'	Stadium: Adush Muça Stadium; Attendance: 3,500; Referee: Kridens Meta

17 December 2010 15	Tirana	4–0	Kastrioti Krujë	Tirana
13:20 CET	Pejić 9', 37'; Lilaj (yellow card) 56'; Plaku 82'; Hajdari (yellow card) 89'; Lila 90'	Report	Caca (yellow card) 8'	Stadium: Selman Stërmasi Stadium; Attendance: 500; Referee: Albano Janku

24 December 2010 16	Laçi	1–1	Tirana	Laç
13:00 CET	Mile 85' (pen.)	Report	Pejić 14'; Osmani (red card) 22'; Morina (yellow card) 63'; Lilaj (yellow card) 67'	Stadium: Laçi Stadium; Attendance: 3,000; Referee: Enea Jorgji

3 February 2011 (Note: The match was scheduled to be played on Monday, January 24, but was postponed for reasons of public order.) 17	Tirana	0–0	Skënderbeu Korçë	Tirana
17:00 CET	Lilaj (yellow card) 42'; Pejić (yellow card) 45'; Karabeci (yellow card) 74'	Report	Bicaj (yellow card) 29'; Bratić (yellow card) 58'; Biskup (yellow card) 65'	Stadium: Qemal Stafa Stadium; Attendance: 7,000; Referee: Lorenc Jemini

31 January 2011 18	Dinamo Tirana	1–2	Tirana	Tirana
17:00 CET	Bakaj 5' (yellow card) 39'; Pisha (yellow card) 34'; Allmuça (yellow card) 55'; Opoku (yellow card) 81'; Peqini (yellow card) 87' (yellow-red card) 89'	Report	Karabeci (yellow card) 12'; Morina 20'; Lila 35' (pen.) (yellow card) 90'; Dushku (yellow card) 45'	Stadium: Qemal Stafa Stadium; Attendance: 5,000; Referee: Lorenc Jemini

6 February 2011 19	Tirana	0–0	Besa Kavajë	Tirana
13:00 CET	Lilaj (yellow card) 2' (yellow-red card) 91'; Lila (yellow card) 29'; Dushku (yellow card) 39'; Osmani (yellow card) 49' (yellow-red card) 82'	Report	Lazarevski (yellow card) 42' (yellow-red card) 72'; Aliju (yellow card) 50'; Poçi (yellow card) 59' (yellow-red card) 59'	Stadium: Selman Stërmasi Stadium; Attendance: 700; Referee: Emirjon Sino

13 February 2011 20	Teuta Durrës	0–0	Tirana	Durrës
13:00 CET	Tahiri (yellow card) 37'; Nina (yellow card) 50'	Report	Pashaj (yellow card) 30'; Karabeci (yellow card) 34'; Lika (red card) 50'	Stadium: Niko Dovana Stadium; Attendance: 1,500; Referee: Elvis Peza

20 February 2011 21	Tirana	0–0	Shkumbini Peqin	Tirana
13:00 CET	Lila (yellow card) 87'	Report	Sekulovski (yellow card) 36'; Veliaj (yellow card) 45'; Shenaj (yellow card) 57'; Gurdijeljac (yellow card) 72'	Stadium: Qemal Stafa Stadium; Attendance: 500; Referee: Kridens Meta

26 February 2011 22	Vllaznia Shkodër	0–0	Tirana	Shkodër
14:00 CET	Smajli (yellow card) 35'	Report	Sina (yellow card) 37'; Dushku (yellow card) 41'; Gvozdenović (yellow card) 41'; Hajdari (yellow card) 74'; Pashaj (yellow card) 80'	Stadium: Loro Boriçi Stadium; Attendance: 6,000; Referee: Enea Jorgji

7 March 2011 23	Tirana	1–2	Teuta Durrës	Tirana
14:00 CET	Sheta 78' (o.g.); Morina (yellow card) 86'; Sina (yellow card) 89'	Report	Pepa 34', 82'	Stadium: Selman Stërmasi Stadium; Attendance: 500; Referee: Aranit Lulaj

12 March 2011 24	Kastrioti Krujë	2–0	Tirana	Krujë
14:00 CET	Alviž (yellow card) 15' (goal) 61'; Muçollari (yellow card) 37'; Ragipović (yellow card) 44'; Inkango 76'	Report	Lila (yellow card) 35'; Pejić (yellow card) 41'; Karabeci (yellow card) 51'	Stadium: Kastrioti Stadium; Attendance: 1,200; Referee: Albano Janku

20 March 2011 25	Tirana	1–0	Shkumbini Peqin	Tirana
13:00 CET	Lilaj (yellow card) 34'; Osmani (yellow card) 39'; Hyka 63'; Balaj (yellow card) 76'	Report	Mustafaj (yellow card) 90'	Stadium: Selman Stërmasi Stadium; Attendance: 100; Referee: Bardhyl Pashaj

1 April 2011 26	Dinamo Tirana	0–0	Tirana	Tirana
15:00 CET	Milović (yellow card) 61'	Report	Žižović (yellow card) 3'; Gvozdenović (yellow card) 34'; Lilaj (yellow card) 47'	Stadium: Qemal Stafa Stadium; Attendance: 1,000; Referee: Enea Jorgji

11 April 2011 27	Tirana	4–0	Laçi	Tirana
15:00 CET	Lika 22'; Dushku (yellow card) 24'; Hyka 29', 90'; Muça (yellow card) 38'; Sina (yellow card) 82'; Lila 82' (pen.)	Report	Kaja (yellow card) 82'	Stadium: Qemal Stafa Stadium; Attendance: 1,000; Referee: Bardhyl Pashaj

15 April 2011 28	KF Tirana	6–1	Elbasani	Tirana
15:30 CET	Hyka 16'; Balaj 28'; Lila 33' (pen.); Gvozdenović 59'; Sorra (yellow card) 80'; Hajdari 82' (yellow card) 82'; Morina 84'	Report		Stadium: Selman Stërmasi Stadium; Attendance: 150; Referee: Sokol Çekaj

20 April 2011 29	Vllaznia Shkodër	1–0	Tirana	Shkodër
13:00 CET	Rajović 50' (pen.); Smajli (yellow card) 75'	Report	Lila (yellow card) 32'; Muça (yellow card) 40'	Stadium: Loro Boriçi Stadium; Attendance: 3,000; Referee: Enea Jorgji

25 April 2011 30	Tirana	0–1	Skënderbeu Korçë	Tirana
15:30 CET	Lika (yellow card) 18'; Balaj (yellow card) 52'; Osmani (yellow card) 55'; Gvozdenović (red card) 60'	Report	Bratić (yellow card) 40'; Shkëmbi 55' (pen.)	Stadium: Qemal Stafa Stadium; Attendance: 2,000; Referee: Edvin Hoxha

30 April 2011 31	Flamurtari Vlorë	2–1	Tirana	Vlorë
15:30 CET	Plaku 1'; Xhafaj 13'; Kuqi (yellow card) 65'; Grami (yellow card) 70'	Report	Pejić 20'; Dushku (yellow card) 60'; Sina (yellow card) 75'	Stadium: Flamurtari Stadium; Attendance: 7,000; Referee: Albano Janku

4 May 2011 32	Tirana	2–1	Bylis Ballsh	Tirana
15:00 CET	Dushku (yellow card) 50'	Report	Gega 11'; Xhafa 60'	Stadium: Selman Stërmasi Stadium; Attendance: 150; Referee: Enea Jorgji

16 May 2011 33	Besa Kavajë	3–2	Tirana	Kavajë
15:00 CET	Shtini 31'; Nora 80' (pen.); Sefa 90'	Report	Pejić 24'; Balaj 59'	Stadium: Besa Stadium; Attendance: 400; Referee: Enea Jorgji

=== Albanian Cup ===
==== First round ====
20 October 2010 First leg	Skrapari	0–1	Tirana	Tirana
13:00 CET		Report		Stadium: Skënder Halili Complex

3 November 2010 Second leg	Tirana	4–0 (5–0 agg.)	Skrapari	Tirana
13:30 CET		Report		Stadium: Selman Stërmasi Stadium

==== Second round ====
24 November 2010 First leg	Ada Velipojë	0–3	Tirana	Velipojë
13:00 CET		Report		Stadium: Fusha Sportive Adriatik

8 December 2010 Second leg	Tirana	2–2 (5–2 agg.)	Ada Velipojë	Tirana
13:00 CET		Report		Stadium: Skënder Halili Complex

==== Quarter-finals ====
16 February 2011 First leg	Bylis Ballsh	2–1	Tirana	Ballsh
13:00 CET	Abazaj 11'; Dimo 75' (pen.)	Report	Lilaj 67'	Stadium: Adush Muça Stadium; Attendance: 1,500; Referee: Pajtim Lapi

2 March 2011 Second leg	Tirana	5–1 (6–3 agg.)	Bylis Ballsh	Tirana
13:00 CET	Dushku 16'; Pejić 37'; Gvozdenović 66'; Hyka 68'; Lila 73'	Report	Dimo 90+1' (pen.)	Stadium: Selman Stëmasi Stadium; Attendance: 300; Referee: Elvis Peza

==== Semi-finals ====
16 March 2011 First leg	Tirana	1–0	Besa Kavajë	Tirana
13:00 CET		Report	Mancaku 15' (o.g.)	Stadium: Qemal Stafa Stadium; Attendance: 300; Referee: Bardhyl Pashaj

6 April 2011 Second leg	Besa Kavajë	1–1 (1–2 agg.)	Tirana	Kavajë
14:30 CET	dos Santos 23'	Report	Balaj 65'	Stadium: Besa Stadium; Attendance: 2,000; Referee: Bardhyl Pashaj

==== Final ====
22 May 2011 Final	Tirana	1–1 (a.e.t.) (4–3 p)	Dinamo Tirana	Durrës
18:00 CET	Pejić 52'	Report	Brkić 19'	Stadium: Niko Dovana Stadium; Attendance: 3,000; Referee: Lorenc Jemini
	Penalties
	Pejić (penalty scored); Gvozdenović (penalty scored); Balaj (penalty missed); Sina (penalty scored); Lila (penalty missed); Muça (penalty scored)		Vila (penalty scored); Ferraj (penalty missed); Milović (penalty missed); Malacarne (penalty scored); Allmuça (penalty scored); Opoku (penalty missed)

=== UEFA Europa League ===
==== First qualifying round ====
1 July 2010 First leg	Tirana (Albania)	0–0	(Hungary) Zalaegerszeg	Tirana, Albania
17:30 CET		Report		Stadium: Qemal Stafa Stadium; Attendance: 1,854; Referee: Raymond Crangle (Northern Ireland)

8 July 2010 Second leg	Zalaegerszeg (Hungary)	0–1 (a.e.t.) (0–1 agg.)	(Albania) Tirana	Zalaegerszeg, Hungary
19:00 CET		Report	Karabeci 107'	Stadium: ZTE Arena; Attendance: 4,000; Referee: Ilias Spathas (Greece)

==== Second qualifying round ====
15 July 2010 First leg	Utrecht (Netherlands)	4–0	(Albania) Tirana	Utrecht, Netherlands
20:00 CET	Van Wolfswinkel 8', 26'; Asare 30'; Mertens 75'	Report		Stadium: Stadion Galgenwaard; Attendance: 9,900; Referee: Stelios Trifonos (Cyprus)

22 July 2010 Second leg	Tirana (Albania)	1–1 (1–5 agg.)	(Netherlands) Utrecht	Tirana, Albania
19:30 CET	Lila 11'	Report	Van Wolfswinkel 3'	Stadium: Qemal Stafa Stadium; Attendance: 3,000; Referee: Radek Matejek (Czech Republic)
