= 2010–11 FK Dinamo Tirana season =

Dinamo Tirana
2010–11 season
- Chairman: (Albania) Besnik Sulaj
- Manager: (Albania) Artan Mërgjyshi
- Kategoria Superiore: 10th
- Kupa e Shqipërisë: 2nd
- Champions League: 2nd Qualifying Round
- Top goalscorer: League: All: Emiljano Vila (9)

During the 2010-11 football season, Dinamo will play its 60th Kategoria Superiore season in the club's existence.

== Club ==
=== Management ===
Position	Staff
Head coach	(Albania) Artan Mergjyshi
Assistant coach	(Albania) Ylli Shehu
Goalkeeping coaches	(Albania) Ilir Bozhiqi
Technical Director	(Albania) Ilir Daja
Fitness coaches	(Croatia) Frano Leko
Club doctor	(Albania) Nderim Rexha

=== Kit ===
Supplier: Sportika
Sponsor(s): Alpet

Home	Away

== Other information ==
President	(Albania) Besnik Sulaj
Vice-president	(Albania) Avni Braçe
Ground (capacity and dimensions)	Qemal Stafa Stadium (24,600 / 105m x 68m)

== Squad ==
=== First team ===
Note: Flags indicate national team as defined under FIFA eligibility rules; some limited exceptions apply. Players may hold more than one non-FIFA nationality.

No.	Pos.	Nation	Player
4	MF	ALB	Asion Daja
5	DF	ALB	Arjan Pisha (captain)
6	DF	ALB	Erion Xhafa
7	DF	ALB	Nertil Ferraj
8	MF	ARG	Lucas Malacarne
9	FW	ARG	Néstor Martinena
11	MF	ALB	Emiljano Vila (on loan from Dinamo Zagreb)
13	DF	ALB	Renato Mallota
14	MF	ALB	Igli Allmuça
15	DF	ALB	Roland Peqini
16	FW	SRB	Mladen Brkić (on loan from KS Skenderbeu Korce)
18	MF	NGR	Nurudeen Orelesi
20	MF	ALB	Isidor Sekseri

No.	Pos.	Nation	Player
21	MF	SRB	Marko Putinčanin
22	DF	GAB	Georges Ambourouet
23	GK	ALB	Alban Hoxha
29	FW	ALB	Fatjon Sefa
—	DF	ALB	Eni Imami
—	DF	ALB	Bledion Guga
—	MF	ALB	Sajmir Gjokeja
—	DF	SRB	Milovan Milović (on loan from Vojvodina)
—	MF	GHA	Jordan Opoku
—	DF	ALB	Antonio Marku
—	DF	ALB	Hegi Ziaj
—	MF	ALB	Leutrim Mulgeci
—	FW	ALB	Gers Delia
—	FW	ALB	Endri Lala

== Competitions ==
=== Albanian Supercup ===
16 August 2010 Final	Besa	3–1	Dinamo Tirana	Durrës
20:30 CET	Poçi 64' (pen.); Dhëmbi 74'; Shtini 85'	Report	El. Bakaj 41'	Stadium: Niko Dovana Stadium; Attendance: 7,000; Referee: Sokol Jareci

=== Kategoria Superiore ===
==== League table ====
Pos	Team	Pld	W	D	L	GF	GA	GD	Pts	Qualification or relegation
8	Kastrioti	33	11	9	13	40	47	−7	42	
9	Shkumbini (O)	33	12	6	15	43	54	−11	42	Qualification for the relegation play-offs
10	Dinamo Tirana (O)	33	10	9	14	46	50	−4	39	Qualification for the relegation play-offs
11	Besa (R)	33	10	9	14	35	47	−12	39	Relegation to the 2011–12 Kategoria e Parë
12	Elbasani (Note: Elbasani were deducted three points for unpaid salaries to former player Darko Perić.) (R)	33	4	3	26	30	79	−49	12	Relegation to the 2011–12 Kategoria e Parë

Source: Albanian Football Association (in Albanian), Soccerway
Rules for classification: 1) points; 2) points in head-to-head matches; 3) goal difference in head-to-head matches; 4) goals scored in head-to-head matches; 5) total goal difference; 6) total goals scored; 7) draw
(O) Play-off winners; (R) Relegated

==== Results summary ====
Overall								Home						Away					
Pld	W	D	L	GF	GA	GD	Pts	W	D	L	GF	GA	GD	W	D	L	GF	GA	GD
33	10	9	14	46	50	−4	39	6	6	5	23	20	+3	4	3	9	23	30	−7

Source: Competitive matches

==== Results by round ====
Round	1	2	3	4	5	6	7	8	9	10	11	12	13	14	15	16	17	18	19	20	21	22	23	24	25	26	27	28	29	30	31	32	33
Ground	H	H	A	H	A	H	A	H	A	H	A	A	A	H	A	H	A	H	A	H	A	H	H	H	A	H	A	H	A	H	A	H	A
Result	L	W	W	W	W	W	D	W	W	D	L	L	D	L	L	D	W	L	L	D	D	L	W	W	L	D	L	L	L	D	L	D	L
Position	11	6	4	3	1	1	1	1	1	1	2	3	3	3	5	5	4	5	5	5	5	6	6	5	6	6	6	6	6	6	7	7	10

Source: Competitive matches
A = Away; H = Home; W = Win; D = Draw; L = Loss

==== Matches ====
Date	Opponents	H / A	Result F – A	Scorers
28 August 2010	Flamurtari Vlorë	H	0-1	
13 September 2010	Teuta Durrës	A	1-2	Elis Bakaj 59' Néstor Martirena 72'
18 September 2010	Shkumbini Peqin	H	1–0	Elis Bakaj 60'
25 September 2010	Vllaznia Shkodër	A	0-4	Néstor Martirena 4', 9', 71', Elis Bakaj 6'
1 October 2010	Elbasani	H	2–1	Elis Bakaj 33', 65'
18 October 2010	Tirana	A	1–1	Néstor Martirena 17'
24 October 2010	Bylis Ballsh	H	2-1	Lucas Malacarne 6' Emiljano Vila 18'
1 November 2010	Kastrioti Krujë	A	1-2	Emiljano Vila 12' Igli Allmuça 52'
5 November 2010	Laçi	H	3-3	Emiljano Vila 8' Elis Bakaj 39' Fatjon Sefa 74'
13 November 2010	Skënderbeu Korçë	A	3-2	Gjergji Muzaka 49' Elis Bakaj 90'
21 November 2010	Flamurtari Vlorë	A	3-1	Elis Bakaj 78'
30 November 2010	Besa Kavajë	A	1-1	Emiljano Vila 75'
12 December 2010	Teuta Durrës	H	1-2	Emiljano Vila 47' (pen)
20 December 2010	Shkumbini Peqin	A	1-0	
23 December 2010	Vllaznia Shkodër	H	0-0	
26 January 2011	Elbasani	A	1-3	Emiljano Vila 17, Elis Bakaj 37', Elis Bakaj 57' (pen)
31 January 2011	Tirana	H	1-2	Elis Bakaj 5'
4 February 2011	Bylis Ballsh	A	3-1	Emiljano Vila 88'
11 February 2011	Kastrioti Krujë	H	0-0	
19 February 2011	Laçi	A	0-0	
25 February 2011	Skënderbeu Korçë	H	1-3	Igli Allmuça 75'
6 March 2011	Shkumbini Peqin	H	4-1	Emiljano Vila 4', Jordan Opoku 38', Igli Allmuça 45', Emiljano Vila 57'
11 March 2011	Elbasani	H	3-1	Nertil Ferraj 36', Mladen Brkić 38', Néstor Martirena 88'
20 March 2011	Laçi	A	1-0	
1 April 2011	Tirana	H	0-0	
11 April 2011	Vllaznia Shkodër	A	3-1	Emiljano Vila 57' (pen)
15 April 2011	Vllaznia Shkodër	H	2-3	Mladen Brkić 55', Mladen Brkić 71'
20 April 2011	Flamurtari Vlorë	A	6-2	Igli Allmuça 7', Endri Lala 52'
24 April 2011	Bylis Ballsh	H	1-1	Emiljano Vila 89'
30 April 2011	Besa Kavajë	A	1-0	
4 May 2011	Teuta Durrës	H	0-0	
16 May 2011	Kastrioti Krujë	A	4-3	Jordan Opoku 11', Igli Allmuça 25', Nertil Ferraj 57' (pen)

==== Relegation play-off ====
26 May 2011	Besëlidhja	1–4	Dinamo Tirana	Kavajë
16:00 CET	Lika 36'		Ferraj 38'; Martirena 44'; Allmuça 54'; Vila 64'	Stadium: Besa Stadium; Attendance: 800; Referee: Lorenc Jemini

=== Albanian Cup ===
Round	Opponents	Aggregated	H/A	First Leg	H/A	Second Leg
1st	Luzi 2008	10-2	A	0-3	H	7-2
2nd	Kamza	5-2	A	2-3	H	2-0
Quarterfinals	Shkumbini Peqin	3-3 Dinamo won 9-8 in penalties	A	2-1	H	2-1
Semifinals	Vllaznia Shkodër	2-2 Dinamo won by away goals	A	2-1	H	1-0

==== Final ====
22 May 2011 Final	Tirana	1–1 (a.e.t.) (4–3 p)	Dinamo Tirana	Durrës
18:00 CET	Pejić 52'	Report	Brkić 19'	Stadium: Niko Dovana Stadium; Attendance: 3,000; Referee: Lorenc Jemini
	Penalties
	Pejić (penalty scored); Gvozdenović (penalty scored); Balaj (penalty missed); Sina (penalty scored); Lila (penalty missed); Muça (penalty scored)		Vila (penalty scored); Ferraj (penalty missed); Milović (penalty missed); Malacarne (penalty scored); Allmuça (penalty scored); Opoku (penalty missed)

=== UEFA Champions League ===
==== Second qualifying round ====
14 July 2010 First leg	Sheriff Tiraspol (Moldova)	3–1	(Albania) Dinamo Tirana	Tiraspol, Moldova
19:00 CET	Volkov 9'; Nikolić 62'; Nadson 70'	Report	Malacarne 12'	Stadium: Sheriff Stadium; Attendance: 6,951; Referee: Daniel Stålhammar (Sweden)

20 July 2010 Second leg	Dinamo Tirana (Albania)	1–0 (2–3 agg.)	(Moldova) Sheriff Tiraspol	Tirana, Albania
18:00 CET	Vila 18'	Report		Stadium: Qemal Stafa Stadium; Attendance: 3,000; Referee: Leontios Trattou (Cyprus)
