= Kabashima =

Kabashima or Kabajima or variation may refer to:

== Places ==
- Kabashima, Nagasaki (Japanese: 樺島, romanized: Kaba-jima, Kaba-shima; かばしま), a Japanese island off the southern coast of Nagasaki Prefecture; also known as Kabajima
- Kabashima, Gotō Islands (Japanese: 椛島, romanized: Kaba-shima, Kaba-jima; かばしま), an island in the Gotō Islands archipelago of Japan; also known as Kabajima
- 4998 Kabashima, a minor planet

== People with the surname ==
- Ikuo Kabashima (蒲島 郁夫, born 1947), Japanese politician
- Fujio Kabashima (born 1939; Japanese: 椛島 冨士夫), Japanese amateur astronomer and author, namesake of 4998 Kabashima
- Kaba-chan (KABAちゃん, born 1969, as Eiji Kabashima, transitioned to Ichika Kabashima), Japanese choreographer

Fictional characters

- Anita Kabashima (椛島 アニータ, Kabashima Anita), a fictional character from Major 2nd

== See also ==
- Kaba (disambiguation)
- Shima (disambiguation)
- Jima (disambiguation)
