= Yağız =

Yağız is a Turkish masculine given name. Notable people with the name include:

- Yağız Kaan Erdoğmuş (born 2011), Turkish chess grandmaster
- Yağız Kaba (born 1989), Turkish basketball player
- Yağız Can Konyalı (born 1991), Turkish actor
- Yağız Göktuğ Taşbulak (born 1991), Turkish footballer
