= Aytuğ =

- Gender: Male
- Language: Turkish

Origin
- Language: Turkic

Other names
- Related names: Altuğ, Göktuğ

Aytuğ is a masculine Turkish given name and a surname.

== People ==
=== Given name ===
- Aytuğ Batur Kömeç (born 2004), Turkish footballer
- Aytuğ Atıcı (born 1964), Turkish politician
- Yüksel Aytuğ (born 1963), Turkish journalist

=== Surname ===
- Mert Aytuğ (born 1984), Turkish auto racing driver
