= Gega (surname) =

Gega is an Albanian surname. Notable people with the surname include:

- Armand Gega (born 1987), Albanian footballer
- Fatbardha Gega (1919-1999), Albanian pedagogist
- Liri Gega (1917–1956), Albanian communist activist and politician
- Luiza Gega (born 1988), Albanian athlete
- Marta Gęga (born 1986), Polish handballer
- Mehmet Gega (1921-2006), Albanian educator and activist
- Ndoc Mark Gega (c. 1830-1908?), Albanian activist
- Ornel Gega (born 1990), Albanian-born Italian rugby union player
- Skënder Gega (born 1963), Albanian footballer
- Theodore Agustin Gega (born 1994) Albanian rapper known as Sin Boy
