= Fejzo =

Fejzo is a given name and surname. Notable people with the name include:

given name

- Fejzo Shenaj (born 1984), Albanian footballer

surname

- Marlena Fejzo (born 1968), American medical scientist
- Muharrem Fejzo (1933–2020), Albanian film directo
