= Shpëtim =

- Gender: Male

Origin
- Region of origin: Albania, Kosovo

Shpëtim is an Albanian masculine given name and may refer to:

- Shpëtim Babaj (born 1981), Kosovar footballer
- Shpëtim Duro (born 1959), Albanian football coach
- Shpëtim Hasani (born 1982), Kosovar footballer
- Shpëtim Idrizi (born 1967), Albanian politician
- Shpëtim Moçka (born 1989), Albanian footballer
