= Shima (surname) =

Shima (written: 嶋 or 島 lit. "island", 志麻 or 志摩) is a Japanese surname. Notable people with the surname include:

- Akira Shima (島 朗, born 1963), Japanese shogi player
- Brian Shima (born 1981), American inline skater
- Daisuke Shima (嶋 大輔, born 1964), Japanese actor
- George Shima (1864–1926), American businessman
- Hideo Shima (島 秀雄, 1901–1998), Japanese engineer
- Hiroo Shima (嶋 宏大, born 1963), Japanese ski jumper
- Hiroshi Shima (島 比呂志, 1918–2003), pen name of Kaoru Kishiue, Japanese writer
- Izumi Shima (志麻 いづみ, born 1953), Japanese actress
- Shima Kakoku (島 霞谷, 1827–1870), Japanese photographer and artist
- Kiyohide Shima (志摩 清英, 1890–1973), Imperial Japanese Navy admiral
- Koichiro Shima (嶋 浩一郎, born 1968), Japanese creative director
- Koji Shima (島 耕二, 1901–1986), Japanese film director, actor and screenwriter
- Masatoshi Shima (嶋 正利, born 1943), Japanese electrical engineer
- Motohiro Shima (嶋 基宏, born 1984), Japanese baseball player
- Ryōka Shima (島 涼香, born 1972), Japanese voice actress
- Shima Ryū (島 隆, 1823–1900), Japanese artist and photographer
- Shima Sakon (島 左近, 1540–1600), Japanese samurai
- Shima Seien (島 成園, 1892–1970), Japanese painter
- Seiichi Shima (嶋清 誠一, 1920-1945), Japanese baseball player and soldier
- Shigenobu Shima (嶋 重宣, born 1976), Japanese baseball player
- Shunsuke Shima (嶋 俊介, 1932–2003), Japanese actor and voice actor
- Takumi Shima (島 卓視, born 1967), Japanese footballer
- Shima Yoshitake (島 義勇, 1822–1874), Japanese samurai
- Yuriko Shima (島 由理子), Japanese women's footballer

== Other people ==
- Eugen Shima (born 1992), Albanian footballer
- Gerti Shima (born 1986), Albanian basketball player

== Fictional characters ==
- Rear Admiral Shima (志摩), a character in the anime series Sky Girls
- Noboru Shima, the human guise of the Tarantula Undead in Kamen Rider Blade
- Shima Rin (志摩 リン), a main character in the anime series Yuru Camp
- Shima Sousuke (志摩 聡介), a main character in the anime series Sukippu to Rōfā

== See also ==
- Shima (given name)
- Shima (disambiguation)
