= Sameas =

Sameas may refer to:

- Latin spelling of the Hebrew name Shemaiah (disambiguation)
- Sameas, a correspondent in the Epistles of Phalaris
