= 2010–11 Albanian Cup =

Kupa e Shqipërisë

Tournament details
- Country: Albania

Final positions
- Champions: Tirana
- Runners-up: Dinamo Tirana

2010–11 Albanian Cup (Albanian: Kupa e shqipërisë) was the fifty-ninth season of Albania's annual cup competition. It began on 21 September 2010 with the First Preliminary Round. The winners of the competition qualified for the second qualifying round of the UEFA Europa League. Besa were the defending champions, having won their second Albanian Cup last season. The cup was won by KF Tirana.

The rounds were played in a two-legged format similar to those of European competitions. If the aggregated score was tied after both games, the team with the higher number of away goals advanced. If the number of away goals was equal in both games, the match was decided by extra time and a penalty shootout, if necessary.

== Preliminary Tournament ==
In order to reduce the number of participating teams for the First Round to 32, a preliminary tournament was played. Only teams from the Kategoria e Dytë (third level) were allowed to enter. Each Kategoria e Dytë group played its own tournament. In contrast to the main tournament, the preliminary tournament was held as a single-leg knock-out competition.

=== First Preliminary Round ===
Games were played on 21 September 2010.

Team 1	Score	Team 2
Erzeni	4–1	Veleçiku
Memaliaj	2–0	Himara
Skrapari	3–1	Olimpik
Albpetrol	0–2	Butrinti
Luzi 2008	2–0	Iliria
Turbina	1–3	Sukthi
Domozdova	2–0	Delvina
Sopoti	2–0	Tepelena

=== Second Preliminary Round ===
Games were played on 28 September 2010.

Team 1	Score	Team 2
Skrapari	2–0	Erzeni
Memaliaj	1–0	Butrinti
Luzi 2008	2–1	Sukthi
Sopoti	1–0	Domozdova

== First round ==
All twenty-eight teams of the 2010–11 Superiore and Kategoria e Parë entered in this round, along with the four Second Preliminary Round winners. First legs were played on 19 October 2010 and the second legs were played on 2 November 2010.

Team 1	Agg.	Team 2	1st leg	2nd leg
Luzi 2008	2–10	Dinamo Tirana	0–3	2–7
Skrapari	0–5	Tirana	0–1	0–4
Tomori	2–4	Flamurtari	0–0	2–4
Vlora	1–7	Shkumbini	0–3	1–4
Bilisht Sport	2–4	Kastrioti	2–2	0–2
Besëlidhja	1–7	Bylis	1–3	0–4
Ada	2–1	Apolonia	2–1	0–0
Memaliaj	3–4	Laçi	1–1	2–3
Partizani	0–1	Kamza	0–1	0–0
Sopoti	2–10	Besa	0–3	2–7
Tërbuni	1–6	Vllaznia	1–1	0–5
Adriatiku	3–4	Teuta	2–3	1–1
Burreli	3–4	Skënderbeu	2–2	1–2
Gramshi	1–2	Elbasani	0–0	1–2
Luftëtari	1–2	Gramozi	0–0	1–2
Lushnja	4–2	Pogradeci	0–1	4–1

== Second round ==
In this round entered the 16 winners from the previous round.

Team 1	Agg.	Team 2	1st leg	2nd leg
Tirana	5–2	Ada	3–0	2–2
Dinamo Tirana	5–2	Kamza	3–2	2–0
Vllaznia	5–0	Elbasani	1–0	4–0
Besa	1–0	Lushnja	0–0	1–0
Laçi	6–2	Gramozi	2–2	4–0
Flamurtari	0–1	Bylis	0–0	0–1
Shkumbini	5–3	Kastrioti	3–1	2–2
Skënderbeu	2–0	Teuta	0–0	2–0

== Quarter-finals ==
In this round entered the 8 winners from the previous round.

Team 1	Agg.	Team 2	1st leg	2nd leg
Vllaznia	6–2	Laçi	2–0	4–2
Bylis	3–6	Tirana	2–1	1–5
Shkumbini	3–3 (8–9 p)	Dinamo Tirana	2–1	1–2 (a.e.t.)
Skënderbeu	3–5	Besa	1–3	2–2

== Semi-finals ==
In this round entered the four winners from the previous round.

Team 1	Agg.	Team 2	1st leg	2nd leg
Tirana	2–1	Besa	1–0	1–1
Vllaznia	2–2 (a)	Dinamo Tirana	2–1	0–1

16 March 2011	Tirana	1–0	Besa	Qemal Stafa Stadium, Tirana
17:05 CET			Mancaku 15' (o.g.)

6 April 2011	Besa	1–1	Tirana	Besa Stadium, Kavajë
15:30 CEST	dos Santos 23'		Balaj 65'

Tirana advanced to the final.

16 March 2011	Vllaznia	2–1	Dinamo Tirana	Loro Boriçi Stadium, Shkodër
14:00 CET	Nallbani 45'; Sukaj 59'		Martinena 86'

6 April 2011	Dinamo Tirana	1–0	Vllaznia	Qemal Stafa Stadium, Tirana
17:00 CEST	Brkić 21'

Vllaznia advanced to the final.

== Final ==
22 May 2011
19:00

Tirana	1–1 (a.e.t.)	Dinamo Tirana
Pejić 53'	Report	Brkić 20'
Penalties
Pejić (penalty scored); Gvozdenović (penalty scored); Balaj (penalty missed); Sina (penalty scored); Lila (penalty missed); Muça (penalty scored)	4–3	(penalty scored) Vila; (penalty missed) Ferraj; (penalty missed) Milović; (penalty scored) Malacarne; (penalty scored) Allmuça; (penalty missed) Opoku

Niko Dovana Stadium, Durrës
Attendance: 3,000
Referee: Lorenc Jemini
