= Shima (given name) =

Given name

Shima is a given name. Notable people with this name include:

- Shima Iwashita (born 1941), Japanese actress
- Shima Mehri (born 1980), Iranian biker
- Shima Nikpour (born 1988), Iranian actress
- Shima Niavarani (born 1985), Iranian-Swedish actress

== See also ==
- Shima (surname)
- Shima (disambiguation)
