= Shema (disambiguation) =

Shema or Shema Yisrael is the central Jewish prayer.

Shema may also refer to:

- Shema, variant name for Shama, Ghana
- Shema, videogame character in Quest for Glory
- Ibrahim Shema, Nigerian lawyer and politician

== See also ==
- Shima (disambiguation)
- Shama (disambiguation)
- Shemaiah (disambiguation)
- Shim'a, an Israeli settlement in the West Bank
