= Kabah =

Kabah may refer to:

- Kabah (Maya site), a Maya civilization city in Yucatán, Mexico
- Kaaba, the holy building in Mecca, Saudi Arabia
- Kabah (band), a Mexican pop music group

== See also ==
- Kaba (disambiguation)
