= Shima =

Shima may refer to:

== Places ==
=== 志摩 (しま), Japan ===
- Shima Province, one of the old provinces of Japan
- Shima, Fukuoka, a former town in Fukuoka Prefecture
- Shima, Mie, a city in Mie Prefecture
  - Shima, Mie (town), a former town in Mie Prefecture that merged with its neighbors to become Shima City

=== 石马 (Shímǎ), China ===
- Shima, Dazu County, in Dazu County, Chongqing
- Shima, Meizhou, in Xingning City, Meizhou City, Guangdong
- Shima, Yongfeng County, in Yongfeng County, Jiangxi
- Shima, Zibo, in Boshan District, Zibo, Shandong
- Shima, Mianyang, in Youxian District, Mianyang, Sichuan
- Shima, Cangxi County, in Cangxi County, Sichuan

=== Elsewhere ===
- Shim'a, West Bank

== People ==
- Shima (surname), a Japanese surname
- Shima (given name), a given name
- Queen Shima, the queen of Kalingga kingdom, c. 674 CE, Central Java
- Shima Iwashita (Japanese: 岩下 志麻)
- Mr. Shima (stage name), the ringname for Japanese pro-wrestler Akio Sato (wrestler)

== Other uses ==
- Shima (film), a 2007 film from Uzbekistan
- Shima is the Unicode name of the Coptic letter ϭ (Tshēma)
- Shima (角力) is Okinawan wrestling.

== See also ==
- Jima (disambiguation), also "island" in Japanese
- Shiba (disambiguation)
- Shiwa (disambiguation)
- Shema (disambiguation)
