= Kaba =

Kaba may refer to:

== Places ==
- Kaaba, the holiest place in the Islamic World, a large cube-shaped building inside the al-Masjid al-Haram mosque in Mecca
- Kaabas, houses of worship mainly located in the Arabian Peninsula that are cubic in shape
  - Kaaba of Najran
  - Ka'ba-ye Zartosht
  - Kaaba of Dhul Khalasa
- Kaba, Hungary, a town in Hajdú-Bihar County, Hungary, which had a rare carbonaceous chondrite meteorite fall in 1857
- Kaba, Kyrgyzstan, a village in Jalal-Abad region
- Kaba, Tibet, a village in Nagarze County, Shannan Prefecture
- Kaba Town, northern suburb of Monrovia, Liberia
- Mount Kaba, a volcano in Indonesia about 6 kilometers southeast of the Rejang Lebong Regency in the Bengkulu province
- Kabah (Maya site) (Kaba), a Mayan archaeological site in Mexico

== Other ==
- Battle of Kaba, a battle in Fiji in 1855
- Kaba (Albanian music), Albanian folk instrumental music genre
- Kaba (drink), an instant cocoa drink
- Kaba Group, a Swiss security technology company
- Kaba language, a Central Sudanic language
- Kaba Modern, a street dance group on MTV's America's Best Dance Crew
- Kaba people, ethnic group of Guinea; see Ange-Félix Patassé
- a cultivar of the tree Karuka
- rats in the Karni Mata Temple, Deshnok, Rajasthan, India
- an OPM song originally by Tenten Muñoz, popularized by Tootsie Guevarra
- Shooting of Chris Kaba, shooting of a British rapper by a police officer during a road block

== People with the surname Kaba ==
- Alpha Kaba (born 1996), a French basketball player
- Gökhan Kaba (born 1983), a Turkish footballer
- Mariame Kaba, an American activist and organizer
- Sory Kaba (born 1995), a Guinean professional footballer
- Yağız Kaba (born 1989), a Turkish basketball player
- Djene Kaba Condé (1960–2023), served as the First Lady of Guinea

== See also ==
- KABA (disambiguation)
- Kabah (disambiguation)
