= KABA =

KABA may refer to:

- Kaba Group, locks and security company
- KNIK-LD, a low-power television station (channel 6) licensed to serve Anchorage, Alaska, United States, which held the call sign KABA-LP from June to September 2009
- KVNT, a radio station (1020 AM) licensed to serve Eagle River, Alaska, which held the call sign KABA from March 2008 to June 2009
- KABA (radio personality), Ghanaian radio presenter

== See also ==
- Kaba (disambiguation)
