= Göktuğ =

Göktuğ is a masculine Turkish given name. In Turkish, Göktuğ means "sky ruler" or "he who governs the sky", derived from the Turkish words "gök" (sky) and "tuğ" (ruler, leader).

== People ==
=== Given name ===
- Göktuğ Bakırbaş (born 1996), Turkish footballer
- Göktuğ Demiroğlu (born 1999), Turkish footballer
- Yağız Göktuğ Taşbulak (born 1991), Turkish footballer
