= 2010–11 Kategoria Superiore =

Kategoria Superiore
- Season: 2010–11
- Dates: 21 August 2010 – 16 May 2011
- Champions: Skënderbeu; 2nd Albanian title
- Relegated: Besa; Elbasani
- Champions League: Skënderbeu
- Europa League: Flamurtari; Vllaznia; Tirana
- Matches: 198
- Goals: 516 (2.61 per match)
- Top goalscorer: Daniel Xhafaj (19 goals)
- Biggest home win: Flamurtari 8–0 Elbasani
- Biggest away win: Vllaznia 0–4 Dinamo; Elbasani 0–4 Vllaznia
- Highest scoring: Flamurtari 8–0 Elbasani; Flamurtari 6–2 Dinamo

The 2010–11 Kategoria Superiore was the 72nd official season, or the 75th season of top-tier football in Albania (including three unofficial championships of WW2) and the thirteenth season under the name Kategoria Superiore. The season began on 21 August 2010 and ended on 16 May 2011. Dinamo Tirana were the defending champions, having won their 18th Albanian championship last season.

The championship was won by Skënderbeu, with Flamurtari and Vllaznia finishing second and third, respectively. On the bottom end of the table, Besa and Elbasani were directly relegated, while Shkumbini and Dinamo Tirana had to compete in the relegation playoffs.

== Teams ==
Apolonia Fier and Gramozi were directly relegated to the Kategoria e Parë after finishing 11th and 12th in the previous year's standings. They are replaced by Kategoria e Parë champions Bylis and runners-up Elbasani.

9th placed Kastrioti and 10th placed Skënderbeu had to compete in single-match relegation play-offs. Kastrioti played against Kategoria e Parë fourth-placed club Lushnja, while Skënderbeu played against Kategoria e Parë third-placed club Kamza. Both Kastrioti and Skënderbeu won their matches 1–0 and retained their places in the league.

=== Stadia and last season ===
Locations of the 2010–11 Kategoria Superiore teams

Team	Location	Stadium	Capacity	Last season
Besa	Kavajë	Besa Stadium	8,000	2nd
Bylis	Ballsh	Adush Muça Stadium	6,500	Kategoria e Parë
Dinamo	Tirana	Qemal Stafa Stadium	19,600	Champions
Elbasani	Elbasan	Ruzhdi Bizhuta Stadium	13,000	Kategoria e Parë
Flamurtari	Vlorë	Flamurtari Stadium	8,500	5th
Kastrioti	Krujë	Kastrioti Stadium	8,400	9th
Laçi	Laç	Laçi Stadium	5,000	4th
Shkumbini	Peqin	Shkumbini Stadium	6,000	7th
Skënderbeu	Korçë	Skënderbeu Stadium	12,000	10th
Teuta	Durrës	Niko Dovana Stadium	12,000	8th
Tirana	Tirana	Selman Stërmasi Stadium	12,500	3rd
Vllaznia	Shkodër	Loro Boriçi Stadium	16,000	6th

=== Personnel and sponsoring ===
Team	Head coach	Team captain	Kitmaker	Shirt sponsor
Besa	(Albania) Gert Haxhiu	(Albania) Artion Poçi	Adidas	Dajti Express
Bylis	(North Macedonia) Nikola Ilievski	(Albania) Amarildo Dimo	Sportika	Gjanica Sh.A.
Dinamo Tirana	(Albania) Ilir Daja	(Albania) Arjan Pisha	Sportika	Alpet
KF Elbasani	(Bosnia and Herzegovina) Esad Karišik	(Albania) Eriol Merxha	Legea	Kürüm
Flamurtari	(Albania) Gugash Magani	(Albania) Artan Sakaj	Adidas	Brunes Hidrosanitare
KS Kastrioti	(Albania) Ramazan Ndreu	(Albania) Ylli Shameti	Lotto	VE
KF Laçi	(Albania) Stavri Nica	(Albania) Sajmir Kastrati	Sportika	Top Sport
Shkumbini	(Albania) Agim Canaj	(Albania) Lorenc Pasha	Sportika	Yldon
Skënderbeu	(Albania) Shkëlqim Muça	(Albania) Bledi Shkëmbi	Adidas	Ama Cafè
Teuta	(Albania) Edi Martini	(Albania) Edmond Doçi	Legea	Abissnet
KF Tirana	(Croatia) Mišo Krstičević	(Albania) Devi Muka	Adidas	BPP Group
Vllaznia	(Albania) Mirel Josa	(Albania) Vioresin Sinani	Legea	Hotel Colosseo-Shkodër

=== Managerial changes ===
The Managerial changes:

Team	Outgoing head coach	Manner of departure	Date of vacancy	Position in table	Incoming head coach	Date of appointment	Position in table
KF Tirana	(Albania) Alban Tafaj	End of contract	26 January 2010	Pre-Season	(Albania) Sulejman Starova	29 March 2010	Pre-Season
KF Tirana	(Albania) Sulejman Starova	Sacked	10 October 2010	6	(Albania) Nevil Dede	11 October 2010	6
Besa	(Albania) Shpëtim Duro	Sacked	29 September 2010	12	(Albania) Përparim Daiu	21 September 2010	12
Besa	(Albania) Përparim Daiu	Sacked	6 November 2010	12	(Albania) Gert Haxhiu	8 November 2010	12
KF Elbasani	(Albania) Krenar Alimehmeti	Sacked	16th week	12	(Bosnia and Herzegovina) Esad Karišik	16th week	12
Dinamo Tirana	(Argentina) Luis Manuel Blanco	Resigned	25 December 2010	5	(Albania) Ilir Daja	30 December 2010	5
KF Tirana	(Albania) Nevil Dede	Sacked	6 February 2011	4	(Croatia) Mišo Krstičević	8 February 2011	4

== League table ==
Pos	Team	Pld	W	D	L	GF	GA	GD	Pts	Qualification or relegation
1	Skënderbeu (C)	33	23	4	6	52	23	+29	73	Qualification for the Champions League second qualifying round
2	Flamurtari (Note: Flamurtari were deducted three points for leaving a match without finishing it.)	33	22	3	8	62	27	+35	66	Qualification for the Europa League first qualifying round
3	Vllaznia	33	17	8	8	41	27	+14	59	Qualification for the Europa League first qualifying round
4	Laçi	33	14	5	14	44	44	0	47	
5	Tirana	33	11	11	11	42	31	+11	44	Qualification for the Europa League second qualifying round (Note: Tirana qualified for the Europa League second qualifying round by winning the 2010–11 Albanian Cup.)
6	Bylis	33	13	4	16	44	48	−4	43	
7	Teuta	33	11	9	13	38	40	−2	42	
8	Kastrioti	33	11	9	13	40	47	−7	42	
9	Shkumbini (O)	33	12	6	15	43	54	−11	42	Qualification for the relegation play-offs
10	Dinamo Tirana (O)	33	10	9	14	46	50	−4	39	Qualification for the relegation play-offs
11	Besa (R)	33	10	9	14	35	47	−12	39	Relegation to the 2011–12 Kategoria e Parë
12	Elbasani (Note: Elbasani were deducted three points for unpaid salaries to former player Darko Perić.) (R)	33	4	3	26	30	79	−49	12	Relegation to the 2011–12 Kategoria e Parë

Source: Albanian Football Association (in Albanian), Soccerway
Rules for classification: 1) points; 2) points in head-to-head matches; 3) goal difference in head-to-head matches; 4) goals scored in head-to-head matches; 5) total goal difference; 6) total goals scored; 7) draw
(C) Champions; (O) Play-off winners; (R) Relegated

== Results ==
The schedule consisted of three rounds. During the first two rounds, each team played each other once home and away for a total of 22 matches. The pairings of the third round were then set according to the standings after the first two rounds, giving every team a third game against each opponent for a total of 33 games per team.

=== First and second round ===
Home \ Away	BES	BYL	DIN	ELB	FLA	KAS	LAÇ	SKË	SKU	TEU	TIR	VLL
Besa		2–1	1–1	2–0	0–0	0–0	1–2	0–2 (Note: This match was awarded 0–2 to Skënderbeu.)	2–1	0–0	2–1	0–1
Bylis	3–1		3–1	1–2	1–0	1–0	1–2	1–1	3–2	3–0	1–1	0–0
Dinamo	2–1	2–1		2–1	0–1	0–0	3–3	1–3	1–0	1–2	1–2	0–0
Elbasani	1–1	3–2	1–3		1–2	1–1	2–3	1–0	1–2	2–0	1–1	0–4
Flamurtari	1–0	1–0	3–1	4–0		3–0	1–0	4–0	4–2	1–0	2–1	2–0
Kastrioti	2–1	2–1	1–2	3–1	1–2		3–1	0–0	2–0	3–1	0–0	0–0
Laçi	1–0	3–1	0–0	1–0	0–1	2–0		0–1	2–0	1–0	1–1	0–1
Skënderbeu	4–0	2–0	3–2	1–0	1–0	5–1	2–1		1–0	2–0	2–1	2–0
Shkumbini	2–2	4–2	1–0	3–2	3–1	2–2	2–1	3–1		1–1	1–3	1–0
Teuta	1–2	6–0	1–2	2–1	2–1	1–1	0–0	2–0	1–0		0–0	0–3
Tirana	0–0	2–1	1–1	3–1	2–1	4–0	2–0	0–0	0–0	2–0		0–2
Vllaznia	2–1	3–2	0–4	3–0	1–3	1–0	2–1	2–1	0–0	0–0	0–0	

Source: Albanian Football Association
Legend: Blue = home team win; Yellow = draw; Red = away team win.

=== Third round ===
Home \ Away	BES	BYL	DIN	ELB	FLA	KAS	LAÇ	SKË	SKU	TEU	TIR	VLL
Besa		2–1	1–0			3–2		0–0			3–2	
Bylis					1–0		1–0		2–0	1–0		2–0
Dinamo		1–1		3–1				2–3	4–1	0–0	0–0	
Elbasani	0–1	0–2				1–2			1–2	2–4		
Flamurtari	3–0		6–2	8–0		1–0		1–0			2–1	
Kastrioti		2–1	4–3					0–2		3–1	2–0	
Laçi	3–2		1–0	3–1	1–1	3–1						1–3
Skënderbeu		3–1		1–0			2–0		2–0	1–0		3–0
Shkumbini	2–2				2–1	2–1	2–5					1–0
Teuta	4–2				1–1		3–2		3–1			0–0
Tirana		0–2		6–1			4–0	0–1	1–0	1–2		
Vllaznia	2–0		3–1	3–1	3–0	1–1					1–0	

Source: Albanian Football Association
Legend: Blue = home team win; Yellow = draw; Red = away team win.

=== Positions by round ===
Team ╲ Round	1	2	3	4	5	6	7	8	9	10	11	12	13	14	15	16	17	18	19	20	21	22	23	24	25	26	27	28	29	30	31	32	33
Skënderbeu	1	1	3	2	3	3	2	2	2	3	3	2	2	2	2	2	2	2	2	2	2	2	2	2	2	2	2	1	1	1	1	1	1
Flamurtari	3	2	2	1	2	2	3	3	3	2	1	1	1	1	1	1	1	1	1	1	1	1	1	1	1	1	1	2	2	2	2	2	2
Vllaznia	2	4	1	5	7	5	4	6	7	7	4	5	5	4	3	3	3	3	3	3	3	3	3	3	3	3	3	3	3	3	3	3	3
Laçi	8	3	6	4	6	4	5	7	8	8	8	6	7	9	7	6	6	6	6	6	6	5	5	4	4	4	4	5	5	5	5	4	4
Tirana	7	8	8	7	4	6	6	8	5	4	5	4	4	5	4	4	5	4	4	4	4	4	4	6	5	5	5	4	4	4	4	5	5
Bylis	10	11	12	12	11	12	12	12	9	11	10	10	11	11	10	10	10	11	11	11	11	11	11	10	10	10	8	10	10	10	9	6	6
Teuta	9	10	10	10	9	8	8	4	6	5	6	7	6	6	6	7	7	7	7	8	9	9	8	9	9	9	11	9	7	9	8	9	7
Kastrioti	4	7	9	8	10	10	10	10	11	10	9	9	9	7	9	8	8	8	9	10	8	8	9	7	7	8	9	8	9	7	6	8	8
Shkumbini	5	9	7	9	8	9	9	5	4	6	7	8	8	8	8	9	9	9	8	7	7	7	7	8	8	7	7	7	8	8	11	10	9
Dinamo	11	6	4	3	1	1	1	1	1	1	2	3	3	3	5	5	4	5	5	5	5	6	6	5	6	6	6	6	6	6	7	7	10
Besa	12	12	11	11	12	11	11	9	10	9	11	11	12	12	12	11	11	10	10	9	10	10	10	11	11	11	10	11	11	11	10	11	11
Elbasani	6	5	5	6	5	7	7	11	12	12	12	12	10	10	11	12	12	12	12	12	12	12	12	12	12	12	12	12	12	12	12	12	12

Leader and UEFA Champions League second qualifying round
UEFA Europa League first qualifying round
UEFA Europa League second qualifying round
Relegation play-off
2011–12 Kategoria e Parë

Source: SoccerAssociation.com

== Relegation playoffs ==
The 9th and 10th-place finishers in the league faced the sixth- and fifth-placed teams of the 2010–11 Kategoria e Parë, respectively, in single match relegation playoffs.

All times CEST

25 May 2011
16:00

Shkumbini	1–0 (a.e.t.)	Mamurras
Mustafaj 93'	Report

Niko Dovana Stadium, Durrës
Attendance: 500
Referee: Elvis Peza

26 May 2011
16:00

Besëlidhja	1–4	Dinamo Tirana
Lika 36'	Report	Ferraj 38'; Martirena 44'; Allmuça 54'; Vila 64'

Besa Stadium, Kavajë
Attendance: 800
Referee: Lorenc Jemini

== Top scorers ==
Rank	Player	Club	Goals
1	(Albania) Daniel Xhafaj	Flamurtari	19
2	(Croatia) Pero Pejić	Tirana	14
3	(Albania) Brunild Pepa	Teuta	13
3	(Albania) Emiljano Vila	Dinamo	13
3	(Argentina) Alfredo Rafael Sosa	Skënderbeu	13
3	(Albania) Vilfor Hysa	Laçi	13
7	(Albania) Vioresin Sinani	Vllaznia	11
7	(Albania) Elis Bakaj	Dinamo	11
7	(Serbia) Mladen Brkić	Skënderbeu/Dinamo	11
10	(Albania) Sebino Plaku	Flamurtari Vlorë	10
10	(Albania) Fjodor Xhafa	Bylis	10

== See also ==
- 2010–11 Albanian Cup
- 2010–11 KF Tirana season
