= Jima =

Jima or JIMA may refer to:

- Jima of Silla
- Jima, Nepal
- Jima, Kenya
- Jima, a Japanese word for "island", as in Iwo Jima or Hachijō-jima
- An alternative spelling for Jimma, Ethiopia

== See also ==
- Shima (disambiguation), also "island" in Japanese
