= Rauf Dimraj =

Albanian football coach and executive

- Born: Albania
- Occupations: Sporting director Fitness coach

Rauf Dimraj is a football executive and coach who has been associated with KF Tirana for many years as a fitness coach and sporting director. On 21 May 2014 he was named as the vice minister of education and sport by the Prime Minister of Albania Edi Rama.
