= Milovan Milović =

Serbian football manager and player

Personal information
- Date of birth: 24 October 1980 (age 46)
- Place of birth: Ivanjica, SR Serbia, SFR Yugoslavia
- Height: 1.86 m (6 ft 1 in)
- Position: Centre-back

Team information
- Current team: Javor Ivanjica (assistant)

Youth career
- Javor Ivanjica

Senior career*
Years	Team	Apps	(Gls)
1999–2003	Javor Ivanjica	130	(1)
2003–2007	Partizan	18	(1)
2004	→ Obilić (loan)	11	(0)
2006	→ Javor Ivanjica (loan)	11	(1)
2006–2007	→ Bežanija (loan)	20	(2)
2007–2010	Javor Ivanjica	70	(4)
2008	→ OFK Beograd (loan)	5	(0)
2010–2012	Vojvodina	13	(0)
2011	→ Dinamo Tirana (loan)	15	(0)
2011	→ Javor Ivanjica (loan)	13	(1)
2012–2017	Javor Ivanjica	144	(4)
Total		450	(14)

International career
2010	Serbia	1	(0)

Managerial career
- 2018–2021: Javor Ivanjica (assistant)
- 2018: Javor Ivanjica (caretaker)
- 2021–2022: Javor Ivanjica
- 2022–: Javor Ivanjica (assistant)
- 2023: Javor Ivanjica (caretaker)
- * Club domestic league appearances and goals

Milovan Milović (Serbian Cyrillic: Милован Миловић; born 24 October 1980) is a Serbian football manager and former player. Throughout his playing career, he made over 400 appearances for Javor Ivanjica across all competitions.

== Club career ==
Milović started out at his hometown club Javor Ivanjica at the age of 7. He was promoted to the senior squad in 1999. During the next four seasons, Milović established himself as a first-team regular, helping them earn their first-ever promotion to the top flight in 2002. He was transferred to Partizan in June 2003, spending half of his four-year contract on loan at other clubs, including spells with Obilić and Bežanija.

In the summer of 2007, Milović moved back to his former club Javor Ivanjica. He was later loaned to OFK Beograd in January 2008, but appeared in just five league matches with the Romantičari, before returning to his parent club. In June 2010, Milović signed a two-year contract with Vojvodina. He then went abroad on loan to Albanian club Dinamo Tirana in January 2011. Subsequently, Milović played for Javor Ivanjica in the first half of the 2011–12 season, before rejoining Vojvodina.

In the summer of 2012, Milović made another return to Javor Ivanjica. He captained the side to the 2015–16 Serbian Cup final, which ended in a 2–0 loss to Partizan.

== International career ==
Milović made one appearance for Serbia, playing the full 90 minutes in a 3–0 away friendly win over Japan on 7 April 2010.

== Managerial career ==
In May 2018, after previously serving as an assistant to Vlado Jagodić, Milović was appointed caretaker manager of Javor Ivanjica until the end of the season.

In May 2023, Milović was named caretaker manager of Javor Ivanjica for the second time in his career, replacing Mladen Dodić with one game left in the season, and saved the club from relegation.

== Career statistics ==
Appearances and goals by club, season and competition
Club	Season	League	
Club	Season	Apps	Goals
Javor Ivanjica	2002–03	33	0
Partizan	2003–04	0	0
Partizan	2004–05	15	1
Partizan	2005–06	3	0
Partizan	Total	18	1
Obilić (loan)	2003–04	11	0
Javor Ivanjica (loan)	2005–06	11	1
Bežanija (loan)	2006–07	20	2
Javor Ivanjica	2007–08	13	2
Javor Ivanjica	2008–09	30	1
Javor Ivanjica	2009–10	27	1
Javor Ivanjica	Total	70	4
OFK Beograd (loan)	2007–08	5	0
Vojvodina	2010–11	6	0
Vojvodina	2011–12	7	0
Vojvodina	Total	13	0
Dinamo Tirana (loan)	2010–11	15	0
Javor Ivanjica (loan)	2011–12	13	1
Javor Ivanjica	2012–13	26	0
Javor Ivanjica	2013–14	27	1
Javor Ivanjica	2014–15	26	1
Javor Ivanjica	2015–16	22	0
Javor Ivanjica	2016–17	33	1
Javor Ivanjica	2017–18	10	1
Javor Ivanjica	Total	144	4
Career total		353	13

== Honours ==
Javor Ivanjica

- Second League of FR Yugoslavia: 2001–02
- Serbian Cup: Runner-up 2015–16

Partizan

- First League of Serbia and Montenegro: 2004–05

Dinamo Tirana

- Albanian Cup: Runner-up 2010–11
