= Aldin Gurdijeljac =

Serbian footballer

Personal information
- Full name: Aldin Gurdijeljac
- Date of birth: January 7, 1978 (age 48)
- Place of birth: Novi Pazar, SFR Yugoslavia
- Height: 1.86 m (6 ft 1 in)
- Position: Defender

Senior career*
Years	Team	Apps	(Gls)
2001–2002	Novi Pazar	27	(0)
2002–2003	OFK Beograd	1	(0)
2003–2009	Novi Pazar	157	(3)
2010	Metalac Kraljevo	13	(1)
2010	Novi Pazar	6	(0)
2011	Shkumbini	11	(0)
- * Club domestic league appearances and goals

Aldin Gurdijeljac (Serbian Cyrillic: Алдин Гурдијељац; born 7 January 1978) is a Serbian retired football defender.

== Club career ==
Born in Novi Pazar, he played with FK Novi Pazar, OFK Beograd and FK Metalac Kraljevo in Serbia, as well as with KF Shkumbini in Albanian Superliga.
