= Altuğ =

Altuğ is a Turkish masculine given name and a Turkish surname.

== Given name ==
- Altuğ Taner Akçam (born 1953), Turkish-German historian, sociologist and author

== Surname ==
- Emre Altuğ (born 1970), Turkish pop singer and actor
- İrem Altuğ (born 1980), Turkish actress and author
- Şevket Altuğ (born 1943), Turkish actor
