= Mehmet Gega =

Mehmet Gega (1921 in Tetovo, Yugoslavia – 2006) was a teacher and an Albanian rights activist. He was born and raised from a noble family, one of the few traditional tetovarian families with old roots. Since he was a young boy, he had a revolutionary spirit and directly recognized the injustices exerted by the Yugoslav gendarmerie in these lands. As a young man, he was noted for his ingenuity, courage, and willingness to resist the violence exercised by the monarchic powers of that time. He was therefore arrested for the first time in 1939.

== History ==
=== Early life ===
Mehmet Gega completed his education in Tetovo. Under the policies of Aleksandar Ranković, many Albanian families were sent to Turkey. In 1955, Gega was sentenced to ten years in prison for obstructing the forced deportation of Albanian families to Turkey. He made connections with teachers in Albania and took illegally books and materials to teach Albanians in Macedonia the alphabet and the treasures of literature. As he wrote in his diary: "There were times when we could die from the cold weather, but the coldest thing was how we were persecuted and followed everywhere... We had books in Albanian but they were banned... I had to do this because every children who speaks Albanian must be educated. Those kids were as my own kids..."

=== 1968 demonstrations in Tetovo ===
On the 18 October 1968, Albanian students and teachers boycotted the High Schools of Tetovo. The students and teachers were demanding the opening of Albanian classes. The opening of Albanian classes was proposed in 1967, but was rejected by Macedonian political bodies. On 20 October 1968, a parallel Albanian education structure was formed.

On 28 November 1968, also the national flag day of Albania, Mehmet Gega organised another protest with the citizens of Tetovo near the clock tower.

On the evening of the 19 December 1968, the beginning of Eid ul-Fitr, Mehmet Gega organised all the mosques within Tetovo and the villages of Tetovo, to raise the Albanian flag from their minarets. Eventually, on the day after, houses and shops also carried out Albanian flags.

Around this time, many Albanian rights protests were organised around the Socialist Republic of Macedonia, Preševo and Kosovo in Serbia, and Montenegro.

=== Retaliation ===
On the evening of December 22, Srečko Janevski, an ethnic Macedonian, tore the Albanian flag from the front of a tailor workshop in the centre of Tetovo. Outraged by this act, Gega and hundreds of Albanians gathered at the scene. Janevski, armed with a gun, fled the scene threatening the Albanians and hid in a hotel. The angry mob marched to the hotel and nearly broke into the hotel. The Macedonian police arrived and intervened, escorting Janevski to safety. Outraged that Janevski escaped retribution, Mehmet Gega's group took position to continue the protest. The next day on December 23, the protest turned into a demonstration. Around 11 organisers:Subi Amiti, Faik Mustafa, Ramadan Sinani, Ismail Emini, Hysniqemal Merxhani etc., were gathered before the shop were the incident took place. Measure of demonstrators, moved from the center toward the municipal assembly. Hamid Salim, a student, and some friends entered the premises of the municipality and in the window of an office on the third floor, raised the Albanian flag. Once notified by the guardians of the municipal police, there is caused a clash between demonstrators and the police. Demanding the release of prisoners arrested by the police, demonstrators then march towards the city market and the road that leads to Ferizaj. During the march, Albanian workers from the Tetex factories joined the march.

The demonstrators were holding banners and transparent national slogans:
"Down with Macedonia"
"We demand the opening of a university in Kosovo,"
"We demand the free use of National Flag"

While endless masses chanting:
"Constitution, Constitution!," Flag, Flag "
"We teach in Albanian." Etc.

In late afternoon, the move from four to five thousand people (which was still growing) was gathered in the centre of the town. The Tetovo police as well as reinforcements from Skopje arrived. In this situation, enthusiasm followed by cheers and banners for national equality. before the crowd, 20-year-old Shifajet Fetahu, climbed a metal pole and put the national flag, raising the flag before the demonstrators.

=== Arrests ===
Many of the protesters were arrested after the demonstrations. Mehmet Gega was sentenced to ten years in prison. First time he was arrested in 1939. Second time: The savage communist system of that time did not allow legal activity, but acted in complete conspiracy and lawlessness, although the patriotic activity of teacher Mehmet Gega, though organized in complete conspiracy, was discovered by the infamous UDB. It was in the city of Skopje, after distributing posters around the country, that he was arrested in one of the towns of Han, and sentenced in May 1955 to 10 years in prison. Third time: Even after serving his sentence in the 1960s, the position of the Albanians had not changed at all, and Mehmet Gega, after his release from prison, became an idol of the Albanian youth - a symbol of resistance. Together with the youth and students of that time studying in Pristina, Belgrade and other centers, they propagated the idea of advancing the rights of Albanians, wherever they lived in their ethnic lands. The political climate created in Kosovo by the student movement and the intensified activity of Mehmet Gega in Tetovo, Gostivar, Skopje, Kumanovo, Bitola, Struga, Ohrid and Debar also found in these spaces unreserved support for a nationwide movement that culminated in demonstrations the glorious 1968. Lightning strikes the highest peaks, again this time Mehmet Gega was charged with organizing and received the maximum sentence as leader of the group - 10 years in prison, of which he served 7 years in the notorious Idrizovo prison. After the end of his imprisonment, he was even more baffled by national ideas and hatred of power-holders, acting fearlessly for the overthrow of Yugoslav power. Thanks to his courage and determination, he had already become an icon of the city of Tetova. Newspapers will write densely about the Tetovo Mendel.

== Aftermath ==
Due to the events that occurred in Tetovo, as well as the protests in Kosovo, the new constitution, implemented by Edvard Kardelj in 1974, allowed the use of the Albanian flag within Yugoslavia, the opening of University in Kosovo, and Kosovo having the same privileges as republic states.
