= Esad Karišik =

Serbian footballer

Senior career*
Years	Team	Apps	(Gls)
1984–1986	Novi Pazar	35	(1)
1988–1989	Novi Pazar	6	(0)

Managerial career
- 2007: Novi Pazar
- 2008-2009: Apolonia Fier
- 2011: Elbasani
- 2012-2013: Ibar
- * Club domestic league appearances and goals

Esad Karišik (Serbian Cyrillic: Есад Каришик) is a Serbian football manager and former player. As player he has played in FK Novi Pazar, in the Yugoslav Second League, between 1984 and 1986 (35 league presences, 1 goal) and 1988–89 (6 league presences).

== Managerial career ==
He became the manager of Montenegrin Second League side FK Ibar on 5 November 2008 after the departure of previous coach, Gerd Haxhiu. In 2018, he was named academy manager at Novi Pazar.

He is of Bosniak ethnicity.
