= Kenan Ragipović =

Serbian footballer

Personal information
- Full name: Kenan Ragipović
- Date of birth: 16 November 1982 (age 43)
- Place of birth: Novi Pazar, SFR Yugoslavia
- Height: 1.73 m (5 ft 8 in)
- Position: Midfielder

Senior career*
Years	Team	Apps	(Gls)
2001–2005	Novi Pazar	60	(5)
2005	Paya Lebar Punggol	0	(0)
2006–2007	Novi Pazar	15	(1)
2007–2008	Gloria Bistrița	19	(0)
2008–2009	FCM Târgu Mureș	6	(0)
2009–2010	Apolonia Fier	27	(1)
2010–2011	Kastrioti	27	(1)
2011–2012	Hajduk Kula	11	(0)
2012–2014	Grbalj	40	(1)
2014–2015	Novi Pazar	20	(0)
2015–2016	Mladost Velika Obarska		
2016	Mornar	15	(0)
2016–2017	Petrovac	19	(1)
2017–2019	Novi Pazar	56	(4)
2019	Sloga Kraljevo	1	(0)
2019–2020	Tutin		
- * Club domestic league appearances and goals

Kenan Ragipović (Serbian Cyrillic: Кенан Рагиповић; born 16 November 1982) is a Serbian retired footballer.

== Career ==
Born in Novi Pazar, SR Serbia, Ragipović started his football career with FK Novi Pazar. He played for Paya Lebar Punggol FC in the S. League during 2005. He moved back to FK Novi Pazar in the Serbian First League for the 2006-07 season, and played for Gloria Bistrița in the Romanian Liga I during the 2007-08 season. After that he played in the FCM Târgu Mureș in the Romanian Liga I. 2009 he moved to Albania and played in first division in FK Apolonia Fier. In 2010, he played in Albanian Superliga with KS Kastrioti.

In summer 2011 he returned to Serbia and made his debut in the Serbian SuperLiga by playing with FK Hajduk Kula during the 2011–12 season. However, in the following summer he would move abroad again, this time to join Montenegrin side OFK Grbalj.

Ahead of the 2019/20 season, Ragipović joined FK Sloga Kraljevo. However, after only one league appearance, he left Kraljevo and joined FK Tutin.
