= Shemaiah =

Shemaiah, a name which in Hebrew (שמע-יה shema-Ya) means "God heard", may refer to:

- Shmaya (tanna), rabbinic sage who was leader of the Pharisees in the 1st century BC
- Any of several people in the Bible; see List of people named Shemaiah in the Bible
- Shemaiah (exilarch), alleged exilarch mentioned in the Seder Olam Zutta, probably sometime in the early 2nd century BC
- Shemaiah of Sossoines, an 11th century rabbi, one of the prime disciples of Rashi

== See also ==
- Shema (disambiguation)
