= Blerti Hajdari =

Albanian footballer (born 1990)

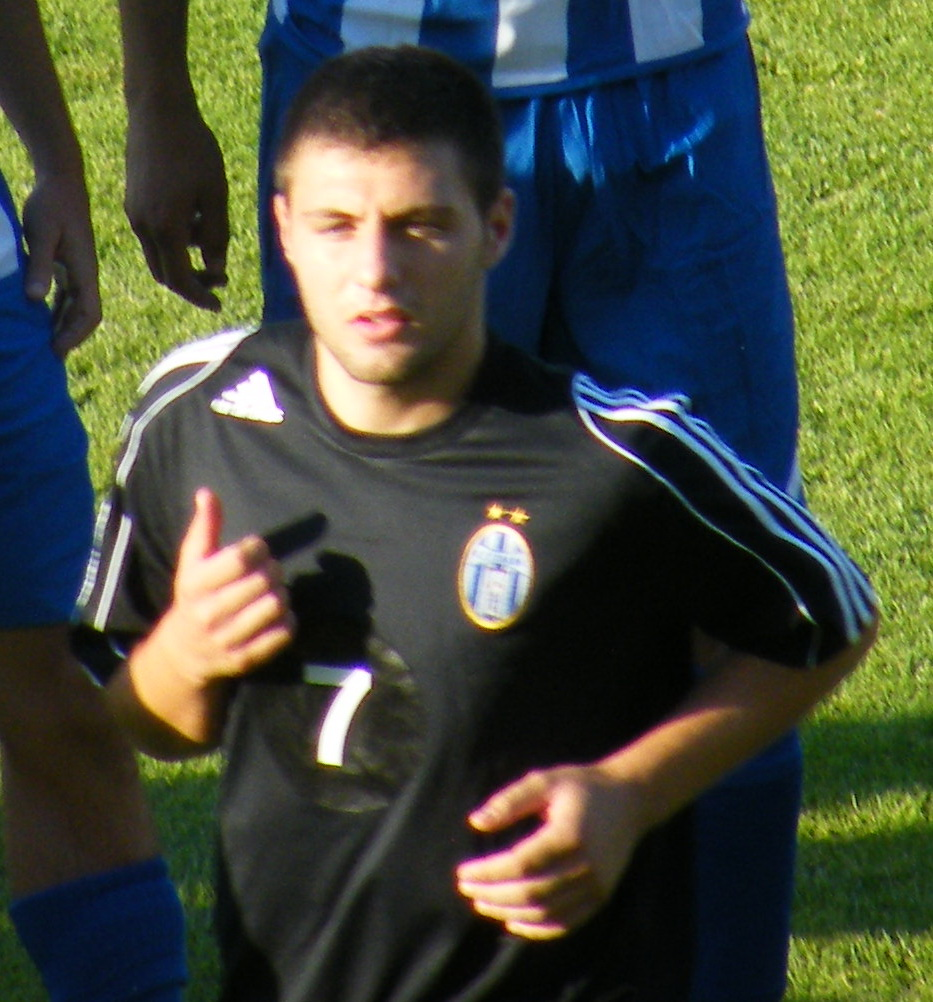

Personal information
- Date of birth: 1 August 1990 (age 36)
- Place of birth: Tirana, Albania
- Height: 1.81 m (5 ft 11 in)
- Positions: Midfielder; forward

Youth career
- 2005–2007: Partizani

Senior career*
Years	Team	Apps	(Gls)
2007–2011	Tirana	22	(3)

International career^{‡}
2006–2007	Albania U-17	3	(1)
2008	Albania U-19	4	(0)
- * Club domestic league appearances and goals as of 20 May 2010 ‡ National team caps and goals as of 20 May 2010

Blerti Hajdari (born 1 August 1990) is an Albanian retired football player. He played for KF Tirana in the Albanian Superliga with his main position being striker but he could also play as an attacking midfielder and as a second striker. After injury cut short his career, he started his own company in the United States.

== Career ==
=== Early career ===
Hajdari started his career with Partizani Tirana at youth level at a young age. He played for the 17s and 19s sides for the club before transferring to KF Tirana in the summer of 2007. Following his move away from Partizani, Hajdari was put into the senior team straight away and began to train with the first team players. He was selected as a federated player for the 2007–08 season for KF Tirana. However, despite being in the first team he was also selected for some KF Tirana U-19 matches in order to gain more experience at the club.

=== KF Tirana ===
==== 2007–2008 ====
He made his league debut for KF Tirana on 8 December 2007 against KS Skenderbeu Korce, Hajdari came on in the 63rd minute for the veteran Nevil Dede. His first league start of his career came on the final day of the season against KS Kastrioti Kruje. Hajdari played the full game in midfield. During the 2007–08 champaign he managed to feature in 4 games without scoring.

==== 2008–2011 ====
Hajdari was part of a number of young players that were in the senior team ahead of the new season, all of them trying to impress new manager Blaž Slišković in order to gain a place in the senior team for the 2008–09 season. Hajdari was part of the lucky few that were picked by Slišković to feature in his team for the new season. His first game of the 2008–09 season came on the opening day of the season against KS Vllaznia Shkoder. Hajdari came on in the 83rd minute for Migen Memelli. During the 2008–2009 season KF Tirana were crowned champions of Albania after a successful season, Hajdari was part of the success but played just 5 games during the entire season, including a start in a Tirana derby against Dinamo Tirana.

=== New York Red Bulls ===
==== 2011–2012 ====
Hajdari decided to move to United States where he joined the New York Red Bulls. He was made part of the team from John Wolyniec, an ex player now the coach of the New York red Bulls 2nd team. Hajdari played 12 games in the NPSL league where the Red Bulls was part and scoring 9 goals.

== International career ==
=== Albania U-17 ===
He was chosen by coach Edmond Licaj to be tested for the Albanian U-17 team on 13 September 2006, whilst still playing for KF Partizani Tirana. He was selected by Licaj for the match against Finland in which Albania lost 4–1 in Finland. Hajdari was given the number 11 shirt and was picked in the starting eleven and also the captain of this team.

=== Albania U-21 ===
Blerti Hajdari was selected by coach Artan Bushati for the Albanian U-21 team for the match against Azerbaijan on 5 September 2009 in Durrës. He was chosen as part of the 23-man squad along with fellow KF Tirana players Migen Metani, Ditmar Bicaj and Albania U-21 captain Erindo Karabeci.

== Career stats ==
Club performance			League		Cup		Continental		Total	
Season	Club	League	Apps	Goals	Apps	Goals	Apps	Goals	Apps	Goals
Albania			League		Albanian Cup		Europe		Total	
2007–08	KF Tirana	Superliga	5	2	2	0	0	05	7	2
2008–09	KF Tirana	Superliga	10	3	4	5	3	10	17	8
2009–10	KF Tirana	Superliga	20	7	6	3	2	0	26	9
