= Jima, Kenya =

Village in Kenya

Coordinates: 3°24′N 39°25′E

Jima is a village in the Pandaguo area of Lamu County, Kenya. It is approximately 2 kilometers from Pandanguo.

== History ==
On July 8, 2017, approximately 15 al-Shabaab terrorists from Somalia beheaded nine male civilians in the village, according to Kenyan government official James Ole Serian.
