= Dušan Popović (footballer) =

Serbian footballer

Personal information
- Date of birth: 20 April 1981 (age 45)
- Place of birth: Negotin, SFR Yugoslavia
- Height: 1.84 m (6 ft 0 in)
- Position: Striker

Senior career*
Years	Team	Apps	(Gls)
2003	Timok		
2004	→ Admira Wacker (loan)		
2004–2005	Volyn Lutsk	1	(0)
2008–2009	Modriča	17	(0)
2010–2012	Bylis Ballsh	36	(3)
2012	Apolonia Fier	7	(0)
2015	Milton	20	(4)
- * Club domestic league appearances and goals

Dušan Popović (Serbian Cyrillic: Душан Поповић, born 20 April 1981) is a Serbian former professional footballer who played as a striker.

== Career ==
Popović was on loan to Admira Wacker Mödling of Austrian Bundesliga in January 2004, from Second League of Serbia and Montenegro side FK Timok. In summer 2004, he moved to play in the Ukrainian Premier League with Volyn Lutsk. In 2008, he played in the Premier League of Bosnia and Herzegovina with FK Modriča. Throughout his tenure with Modrica he played in the 2008–09 UEFA Champions League against Aalborg BK. He played in the Albanian Superliga in 2010 with KF Bylis, and later with FK Apolonia Fier in 2012. In 2015, he played in the Canadian Soccer League with Milton SC.
