= Shima (film) =

- Directed by: Bakhodir Yuldashev
- Written by: Yusup Razykov; Bakhodir Yuldashev
- Produced by: Pierre Henriot
- Starring: Seidula Moldakhanov; Mikhail Vodzumi
- Music by: Artyom Kim and The Philharmic Orchestra of Tashkent
- Release date: 2007
- Running time: 93 min.
- Country: Uzbekistan
- Language: Russian (Eng Subs)
- Budget: $1,000,000 (US)

Shima is a 2007 film from Uzbekistan.

== Plot ==
At the end of the Second World War, imperial Japanese fanaticism seals the fate of an island's inhabitants and its garrison, through a massacre, interrupting the love between a soldier and a fisherman's daughter. The daughter survives, but the other survivor Taro- a soldier cut off from all communication- continues to serve the emperor for another thirty years. Tormented in his dreams by memories and his secret aspiration for eternal peace.

Taro is regularly 'inspected' by his former military inspector Yamada, who exploits the situation to entertain former Japanese officers, nostalgic of Imperial Japan, by luring visitors to the island through his War Veterans Association. The visitors are held captive and enrolled by Taro to serve in the army of the Great Emperor. For the sadistic pleasure of the former Japanese officers, Yamada organises "inspections" during which the new recruits must prove their devotion to the emperor by sacrificing their lives.

Many years later Shintaro, the son of the fisherman's daughter, finds himself on the island after searching for his father. He learns his father disappeared on the island just before the massacre. He contacts Yamada through the War Veterans Association, who agrees to take him and others to the island. But once they arrive he abandons them and puts Taro in charge. For Shintaro and his comrades this means forced enrolment, military drills and suffering. After months of torture Shintaro and the other captives start to accept Taro's twisted sense of reality. The training intensifies as Taro prepares the recruits to fight a mysterious enemy.

== Cast ==
- Seidula Moldakhanov as Taro
- Mikhail Vodzumi as Shintaro
- Anvar Kenjaev as Yamada

== Influences ==
Based on the true story of Lieutenant Hiroo Onoda, a Japanese holdout who did not surrender until 1974. During his service, it has been estimated that he killed about thirty people, including American soldiers and local police militia.
