= Sajmir Gjokeja =

Albanian footballer (born 1985)

Personal information
- Full name: Sajmir Gjokeja
- Date of birth: 31 March 1985 (age 41)
- Place of birth: Fushë-Krujë, Albania
- Position: Midfielder

Team information
- Current team: Iliria
- Number: 3

Senior career*
Years	Team	Apps	(Gls)
2006–2008	Burreli	20	(2)
2009–2010	Kamza	1	(0)
2010	Dinamo Tirana	3	(0)
2011	Adriatiku	1	(0)
2011–2013	Iliria	46	(8)
2013–2014	Kamza	27	(2)
2014–2016	Besëlidhja	37	(1)
2016	Turbina	10	(0)
2017	Kastrioti	11	(0)
2017–	Iliria	41	(13)
- * Club domestic league appearances and goals

Sajmir Gjokeja (born 31 March 1985) is an Albanian footballer who currently plays as an offensive midfielder for Iliria Fushë-Krujë in the Albanian First Division.
