= Yağız Göktuğ Taşbulak =

Turkish footballer

Personal information
- Full name: Yagiz Göktug Tasbulak
- Date of birth: 3 January 1991 (age 35)
- Place of birth: Istanbul, Turkey
- Height: 1.78 m (5 ft 10 in)
- Position: Midfielder

Team information
- Current team: Kartalspor
- Number: 55

Senior career*
Years	Team	Apps	(Gls)
2009–2010	Kartalspor	2	
- * Club domestic league appearances and goals

Yagiz Göktug Tasbulak (born 3 January 1991 in Istanbul) is a Turkish football midfielder currently playing for Kartalspor of the Turkish TFF 1. League.

Taşbulak was promoted to Kartalspor's first team and made his debut against Altay S.K. on 23 September 2009.
