= Shpëtim Babaj =

Kosovar footballer

Personal information
- Full name: Shpëtim Babaj
- Date of birth: 9 December 1981 (age 44)
- Place of birth: Pristina, SFR Yugoslavia
- Height: 1.81 m (5 ft 11 in)
- Position: Midfielder

Team information
- Current team: Trepça (manager)

Youth career
- 1988–1998: Cibalia
- 1998–1999: Cagliese
- 1999–2001: Olimpija Ljubljana

Senior career*
Years	Team	Apps	(Gls)
2001–2003	Rudar Velenje	33	(4)
2003–2004	Šmartno	28	(4)
2004–2005	Besiana	34	(12)
2005–2007	Besa Kavajë	64	(2)
2007–2008	Elbasani	17	(1)
2008	Zorya Luhansk	31	(0)
2008–2009	Shakhter Karagandy	16	(2)
2009–2010	Gramozi	32	(2)
2010–2011	Tirana	7	(0)
2011–2014	Trepça	156	(36)
2014	Trepça'89	17	(2)
2014–2016	Hajvalia	65	(12)
2016–2017	Ferizaj	16	(1)
Total		516	(78)

Managerial career
- 2018–2019: Fortuna Oslo (youth)
- 2020–2021: Lillestrøm SK (youth)
- 2022: Korsvoll IL (youth)
- 2022–2024: Oppsal IF II
- 2025: Prishtina e Re
- 2026–: Trepça
- * Club domestic league appearances and goals

Shpëtim Babaj (Croatian: Špetim Babaj; born 9 December 1981) is a Kosovan professional football manager and former player who is the current manager of Kosovo First League club Trepça.

A former midfielder, Babaj began his youth career with Cibalia in Croatia, where he acquired Croatian citizenship, before continuing his development with Cagliese in Italy and Olimpija Ljubljana in Slovenia. He began his senior career with Rudar Velenje in 2001 and later played for Šmartno, Besiana, Besa Kavajë, Elbasani, Zorya Luhansk, Shakhter Karagandy, Gramozi, Tirana, Trepça, Trepça '89, Hajvalia, and Ferizaj.

Following his retirement from professional football, Babaj moved into coaching in Norway, working in youth football with Fortuna Oslo, Lillestrøm SK and Korsvoll IL. He later managed Oppsal IF II between 2022 and 2024 before returning to Kosovo, where he first served as sporting director and later as manager of Prishtina e Re in 2025. In 2026, he was appointed manager of Trepça.

== Managerial career ==
In September, 2025, Babaj became the manager of Prishtina e Re of the Football Superleague of Kosovo.

On 1 May 2026, Babaj was appointed as the head coach of Trepça of the First Football League of Kosovo.
