= Emiljano Vila =

Albanian footballer (born 1988)

Personal information
- Date of birth: 12 March 1988 (age 38)
- Place of birth: Durrës, Albania
- Height: 1.80 m (5 ft 11 in)
- Position: Attacking midfielder

Team information
- Current team: Teuta
- Number: 88

Youth career
- 2004–2005: Teuta

Senior career*
Years	Team	Apps	(Gls)
2005–2009	Teuta	70	(30)
2009–2010	Dinamo Zagreb	0	(0)
2009	→ NK Lokomotiva (loan)	6	(0)
2010–2011	Dinamo Tirana	45	(15)
2011–2014	PAS Giannina	79	(8)
2014–2015	Partizani Tirana	34	(4)
2015	Inter Baku	6	(0)
2016–2018	Partizani Tirana	67	(5)
2018	Skënderbeu	14	(2)
2018–2019	Kerkyra	14	(1)
2019–2023	Teuta	137	(10)
2023–2024	Partizani Tirana	14	(0)
2024–	Teuta	47	(3)

International career^{‡}
2003–2004	Albania U17	1	(0)
2005–2006	Albania U19	3	(1)
2007–2010	Albania U21	9	(0)
2009–2014	Albania	27	(3)
- * Club domestic league appearances and goals as of 13 May 2026 ‡ National team caps and goals as of 14 November 2014

Emiljano Vila (born 12 March 1988) is an Albanian professional footballer who plays as an attacking midfielder for Teuta in the Albanian Superliga and the Albania national football team.

== Club career ==
=== Early career ===
Vila started his career with his hometown team, Teuta Durrës in 2006. He made his debut on 26 November 2006 in an away match against Partizani Tirana. Vila came on for Bledar Mancaku in the 77th minute of the game. His first goal came in only his 8th career appearance on 10 March 2007 against Luftetari Gjirokaster. Vila was on the pitch for the full 90 minutes and scored the opening goal in the 47th minute. The match ended 3–0 for Teuta Durrës after two further goals by Daniel Xhafa and Bledar Mancaku.

=== Dinamo Zagreb ===
He signed a 4-year contract with Croatian champions Dinamo Zagreb on 19 June 2009 and was sent on loan at fellow Croatian side Lokomotiva Zagreb without playing any match for the club.

=== Dinamo Tirana ===
After a brief spell in Croatia, Vila decided to return in Albania where he signed with capital club of Dinamo Tirana for a fee of $55.000, with Vila earning €30,000 a season. He made his debut with Dinamo on 25 January 2010 in the first match of the second part of the season against Tirana, playing full-90 minutes in a 2–1 win.

=== PAS Giannina ===
Vile reached a verbal agreement to join international teammate Andi Lila at Greek side PAS Giannina on 30 June 2011, and completed a medical the next day to complete his move. He scored his 1st goal in the Super League Greece in the match against Panaitolikos, by scoring the winning goal of his team in the 71st minute. He also helped his team achieve its 2nd away consecutive win against PAOK, by scoring his 1st goal of his team on the 7th minute.

=== Partizani Tirana ===
Vila returned in Albania in August 2014 to sign a one-year contract with an option of a further one with capital club Partizani Tirana. He aimed the championship title during his presentation and took squad number 88. He then flew op to Bulgaria to link up with the rest of the squad in their summer training camp. Following the end of summer transfer market, Partizani had made 32 transfers in an out, a record in Albanian football.

Vila's transfer to Partizani was opposed by Albania senior team manager Gianni De Biasi, stating that he made a mistake by returning in Albania. His statements where opposed by Albanian Football Association president Armand Duka, who replied that Vila did not make a mistake by moving to Partizani.

Vila made his competitive debut for Partizani in the opening matchday of 2014–15 Albanian Superliga against Laçi, playing 78 minutes in a 1–1 away draw. Vila was chosen as the next penalty taker following the 0–1 loss at Apolonia Fier after capitain Nderim Nexhipi missed a penalty.

His home debut occurred on 11 September in the match versus Skënderbeu Korçë, netting his maiden Partizani goal via a penalty kick in the 90th minute to give the Red Bull the first league win of season. He dedicated the goal to manager Shpëtim Duro and club fans.

Later on 26 October Vila missed a penalty kick in the matchday 9 versus newly promoted Elbasani; his shot was saved by veteran goalkeeper Elvis Kotorri; this chance didn't fatal as Partizani won 1–0 thanks to a Stevan Račić goal. He ended his first part of the league by scoring once in nine appearances, with Partizani who finished the first part of the season with 18 points, tied with rivals of Tirana as a leader.

=== Inter Baku ===
On 20 September 2015, Vila signed a six-month contract with Azerbaijan Premier League side Inter Baku PIK.

=== Return to Partizani Tirana ===
On 20 January 2016, Vila signed a one-and-a-half contract with his former club Partizani Tirana, returning there for the second part of 2015–16 season. On 13 May 2016, with the match against Skënderbeu Korçë approaching injury time, he scored a full volley goal to give Partizani the 1–0 victory at Skënderbeu Stadium and retain the title hopes alive.

Vila left the club in the first days of January 2018 after being excluded from winter training camp in Antalya.

=== Skënderbeu Korçë ===
On 13 January 2018, Skënderbeu Korçë announced to have sign Vila on a 18-month contract. After signing the contract, Vila flew out to Antalya, Turkey to link up with the rest of the squad on their winter training camp. He made his league debut his new club on 26 January 2018 in a 2–0 away loss to Luftëtari Gjirokastër. He scored his first league goal for Skenderbeu as part of a brace on 18 February 2018 in a 2–1 away victory over FC Kamza. His goals, scored in the 55th and 69th minutes, led Skenderbeu to a come from behind victory.

=== Second return to Teuta ===
On 12 July 2024, Vila returned to Teuta after one season, signing a one-year contract.

== International career ==
Vila made his debut for the full national team on 11 June 2009 in a friendly match against Georgia, starting and playing 80 minutes in a 1–1 home draw. He scored on his second international appearance against Cyprus at home to help Albania to win 6–1, recording the biggest win in its history.

He also played for the national team in a friendly against Milan at Qemal Stafa Stadium which ended 3–3. Vila scored one of the goals however that goal was not count for statistics of the senior team, because the match was not played against another national team.

On 16 October 2012, Vila provided the assist for Odise Roshi’s decisive first-half goal in a 1–0 home victory against Slovenia during the 2014 FIFA World Cup qualification campaign.

He scored his third goal for Albania on 8 June 2014, playing as a starter against San Marino and scoring the third goal in the 73rd minute in an eventual 3–0 away win.

== Career statistics ==
=== Club ===
As of 22 December 2017

Club statistics
Club	Season	League			Cup		Europe		Total	
Club	Season	Division	Apps	Goals	Apps	Goals	Apps	Goals	Apps	Goals
Teuta Durrës	2006–07	Albanian Superliga	17	2	0	0	—		17	2
Teuta Durrës	2007–08	Albanian Superliga	24	0	0	0	2 (Note: All appearance(s) in UEFA Cup)	0	26	0
Teuta Durrës	2008–09	Albanian Superliga	31	15	2	2	—		33	17
Teuta Durrës	Total		72	17	2	2	2	0	76	19
NK Lokomotiva (loan)	2009–10	Prva HNL	8	0	0	0	—		8	0
Dinamo Tirana	2009–10	Albanian Superliga	15	2	2	0	—		15	2
Dinamo Tirana	2010–11	Albanian Superliga	31 (Note: Including one appearance and one goal in Albanian Superliga relegation play-off)	14	8 (Note: Including one appearance in Albanian Supercup)	3	2 (Note: All appearance(s) in UEFA Champions League)	1	41	18
Dinamo Tirana	Total		46	16	10	3	2	1	58	20
PAS Giannina	2011–12	Super League Greece	22	5	0	0	—		22	5
PAS Giannina	2012–13	Super League Greece	33	0	6	1	—		39	1
PAS Giannina	2013–14	Super League Greece	29	3	2	0	—		31	3
PAS Giannina	Total		84	8	8	1	—		92	9
Partizani Tirana	2014–15	Albanian Superliga	34	4	0	0	—		34	4
Partizani Tirana	2015–16	Albanian Superliga	—		—		2 (Note: All appearance(s) in UEFA Europa League)	0	2	0
Partizani Tirana	Total		34	4	0	0	2	0	36	4
Inter Baku	2015–16	Azerbaijan Premier League	6	0	1	0	—		7	0
Partizani Tirana	2015–16	Albanian Superliga	18	4	1	0	—		19	4
Partizani Tirana	2016–17	Albanian Superliga	35	1	2	1	7 (Note: Four appearances in UEFA Europa League, three in UEFA Europa League)	0	44	2
Partizani Tirana	2017–18	Albanian Superliga	14	0	1	0	2	0	17	0
Partizani Tirana	Total		67	5	4	1	9	0	80	6
Skënderbeu Korçë	2017–18	Albanian Superliga	0	0	0	0	—		0	0
Career total			316	54	25	7	15	1	356	62

=== International ===
As of 14 November 2014

Appearances and goals by national team and year
National team	Year	Apps	Goals
Albania	2009	4	1
Albania	2010	3	0
Albania	2011	3	0
Albania	2012	8	1
Albania	2013	3	0
Albania	2014	4	1
Total		25	3

=== International goals ===
As of match played 14 November 2014. Albania score listed first, score column indicates score after each Vila goal.

International goals by date, venue, cap, opponent, score, result and competition
No.	Date	Venue	Cap	Opponent	Score	Result	Competition
1	12 August 2009	Qemal Stafa Stadium, Tirana, Albania	2	Cyprus	6–1	6–1	Friendly
2	27 May 2012	BJK İnönü Stadium, Istanbul, Turkey	14	Iran	1–0	1–0	Friendly
3	8 June 2014	Serravalle Stadium, Serravalle, San Marino	26	San Marino	3–0	3–0	Friendly

== Honours ==
=== Club ===
Dinamo Tirana

- Albanian Superliga: 2009–10
- Albanian Cup: 2010–11

=== Individual ===
- Albanian Superliga Talent of the Season: 2008–09
