= Ivan Gvozdenović =

Serbian footballer and manager

Personal information
- Date of birth: 19 August 1978 (age 48)
- Place of birth: Bor, SR Serbia, SFR Yugoslavia
- Height: 1.84 m (6 ft 0 in)
- Position: Defender

Youth career
- Bor
- Red Star Belgrade

Senior career*
Years	Team	Apps	(Gls)
1996–2003	Red Star Belgrade	147	(8)
1996–1997	→ Radnički Pirot (loan)	6	(0)
1997–1998	→ Napredak Kruševac (loan)	5	(0)
1998–1999	→ Milicionar (loan)	13	(2)
2003–2007	Club Brugge	77	(3)
2005	→ Metz (loan)	6	(0)
2007	Dinamo București	2	(0)
2008	Metalurh Donetsk	9	(1)
2009	Red Star Belgrade	7	(1)
2009	Vojvodina	5	(0)
2010	Kavala	4	(0)
2010–2011	Tirana	29	(1)
2011–2014	Skënderbeu	67	(0)
2014–2015	Kukësi	4	(0)
Total		336	(16)

International career
2001	FR Yugoslavia	1	(0)

Managerial career
- 2015: Tirana(assistant)
- 2015–2016: Kukësi (assistant)
- 2016–2017: Tirana (assistant)
- 2017–2018: Al-Faisaly Amman(assistant)
- 2018–2019: Al-Mujazzal
- 2019–2020: Radnički 1912
- 2020–2021: Foresta Suceava
- 2021–2022: Saham Club
- 2022: Foresta Suceava
- 2022–2024: Skënderbeu
- 2024–2026: Elbasani
- * Club domestic league appearances and goals

Ivan Gvozdenović (Serbian Cyrillic: Иван Гвозденовић; born 19 August 1978) is a Serbian retired professional football defender.

== Club career ==
Gvozdenović started his career at hometown side FK Bor but later moved to Red Star Belgrade. He went on to play on loan for Radnički Pirot, Napredak Kruševac and FK Milicionar. In 1999, he returned to Red Star and played over 100 matches, before joining Belgian side Club Brugge in 2003. He spent six months at FC Metz in 2005, on loan from Club Brugge. In July 2007, Gvozdenović was released from Brugge and joined Romanian side Dinamo Bucharest in October 2007, initially signing a three-year contract. He left the team after only one month, due to a change of coach. Gvozdenović was told that he did not feature in the new coach's plans. After his short spell for Dinamo, he was transferred to Ukrainian club Metalurh Donetsk, before being released on July of the same year. In January 2009, he joined Red Star Belgrade for a second spell. On 21 August 2009, FK Vojvodina signed Gvozdenović from Red Star Belgrade for one season. He then spent the second half of the 2009–10 season at Kavala F.C. from Greece. On 17 May 2010, the New England Revolution of Major League Soccer announced that Gvozdenović had joined the team on trial. He started for the Revs in their friendly match against Benfica on 19 May 2010. However, he did not sign with New England Revolution and went to play for KF Tirana. He declared his wish is to finish career in FK Bor, the club where he started to play football. Between 2011 and 2014 he played three seasons for Skënderbeu Korçë who won the Albanian Championship in all of those three seasons. He played for Kukësi for the 2014–15 season, before retiring from football.

== International career ==
Gvozdenović's first and only cap for FR Yugoslavia is against Slovenia in a FIFA World Cup qualifying match in September 2001.

== Managerial career ==
After two seasons in Albanian Superliga as an assistant coach of his two former clubs, Kukësi and Tirana, on 8 January 2018 Gvozdenović was appointed a coach of Jordan Premier League side Al-Faisaly Amman, in order to join the technical staff led by Montenegrin coach Nebojša Jovović. In July 2018 he signed for Al Mujazzal Saudi Arabia (as a head coach).

== Style of play ==
Gvozdenović was a technical, attacking full-back who also played as a midfielder.

== Honours ==
Red Star Belgrade

- First League of FR Yugoslavia: 2000, 2001
- FR Yugoslavia Cup: 2000, 2002

Club Brugge

- Belgian Cup: 2003–04, 2006–07
- Belgian Supercup: 2003, 2004

KF Tirana

- Albanian Cup: 2010–11

Skënderbeu Korçë

- Albanian Superliga: 2011–12, 2012–13, 2013–14

As a manager:

- Kategoria e Parë : 2022–23
