= Yağız Kaba =

Turkish basketball player (born 1989)

Beşiktaş Cola Turka
- Position: Guard
- League: TBL

Personal information
- Born: 7 August 1989 (age 37) Konak, Turkey
- Listed height: 6 ft 3 in (1.91 m)

Career information
- Playing career: 2008–present

Nasuhi Yağız Kaba (born 7 August 1989) is a Turkish professional basketball player. He currently plays for Beşiktaş Cola Turka.
