= Eugen Shima =

Albanian footballer

Personal information
- Full name: Eugen Besnik Shima
- Date of birth: 31 October 1992 (age 34)
- Place of birth: Tirana, Albania
- Position: Defender

Youth career
- Dinamo Tirana
- –2010: Tirana

Senior career*
| Years | Team | Apps | (Gls) |
| 2010–2013 | Tirana | 3 | (0) |
| 2011–2012 | → Adriatiku (loan) | 43 | (4) |
| 2013–2014 | Besëlidhja | 23 | (7) |
| 2014–2016 | Adriatiku | 34 | (1) |
| 2016 | Turbina | 9 | (0) |

International career
| 2008 | Albania U-17 | 3 | (0) |
- * Club domestic league appearances and goals

Eugen Besnik Shima (born 31 October 1992) is an Albanian professional footballer who most recently played as a defender for Turbina Cërrik in the Albanian First Division.

== Honours ==
KF Tirana

- Albanian Cup (1): 2010–11
