= Fejzo Shenaj =

Albanian footballer

Personal information
- Full name: Fejzo Shenaj
- Date of birth: 24 November 1984 (age 41)
- Place of birth: Gjirokastër, Albania
- Position: Midfielder

Youth career
- –2003: Lushnja

Senior career*
Years	Team	Apps	(Gls)
2003–2007	Luftëtari	26+	(2+)
2007–2009	Shkumbini	60	(1)
2009	Kastrioti	11	(0)
2010–2012	Shkumbini	61	(7)
2012–2013	Luftëtari	14	(2)
2013–2014	Dinamo Tirana	6	(0)
2014–2016	Luftëtari	44	(3)
2016–2017	Shkumbini	11	(1)
- * Club domestic league appearances and goals

Fejzo Shenaj (born 24 November 1984 in Gjirokastër) is an Albanian footballer who most recently played for Shkumbini Peqin in the Albanian First Division.

== Club career ==
He had spells with different clubs between 2003 and 2014, most notably with Shkumbini Peqin.

In April 2014, it was reported Shenaj and his wife were missing for several months after he allegedly received death threats due to suspected debts. He however returned to hometown club Luftëtari four months later.
