= Armand Gega =

Albanian footballer

Personal information
- Full name: Armand Gega
- Date of birth: 21 January 1987 (age 39)
- Place of birth: Fier, Albania
- Position: Midfielder

Team information
- Current team: Shënkolli

Senior career*
Years	Team	Apps	(Gls)
2006–2009	Apolonia	40	(5)
2009–2013	Bylis	58	(5)
2013	Himarë	21	(1)
2014	Apolonia	13	(1)
2014	Bylis	10	(1)
2015	Tomori	9	(0)
2015–2016	Butrinti	13	(1)
2017–	Shënkolli		
- * Club domestic league appearances and goals as of 23 May 2009 ‡ National team caps and goals as of 23 May 2009

Armand Gega (born 21 January 1987) is an Albanian football player. The midfielder currently plays for Shënkolli.
