= Lucas Malacarne =

Argentine footballer

Personal information
- Full name: Lucas Damian Malacarne
- Date of birth: 25 November 1988 (age 37)
- Place of birth: Viedma, Argentina
- Height: 1.85 m (6 ft 1 in)
- Position: Defender

Youth career
- 2002–2008: River Plate

Senior career*
Years	Team	Apps	(Gls)
2008–2009	CAI	17	(1)
2009–2011	FK Dinamo	50	(5)
2011–2012	KS Kastrioti	25	(0)
2012–2014	FK Kukësi	24	(2)
2014–2018	El Porvenir		
2018–2023	Sol de Mayo	63	(3)
- * Club domestic league appearances and goals as of 23 October 2022

Lucas Damian Malacarne (born 25 November 1988) is an Argentine footballer who plays as a defender.

== Career ==
Malacarne started his career with Argentine club Comisión de Actividades Infantiles (CAI) from Comodoro Rivadavia, Chubut Province as a teenager. He had a trial at Major League Soccer side FC Dallas which led to a short-term loan move to the United States in 2008. He then played for Argentine team Club Atlético River Plate in 2009 before heading to Albania with Dinamo Tirana during the summer of 2009.

=== Dinamo Tirana ===
Malacarne arrived at Tirana International Airport Nënë Tereza on 4 July 2009 despite reports in Albania stating that his move to Dinamo Tirana would be completed no sooner than 3 August 2009. He made his competitive debut for the club in the 2009–10 UEFA Europa League second leg tie against FC Lahti. He performed well on his debut which helped the club to a 2–0 win over the Finnish side, however it was not enough as Dinamo Tirana crashed out of the competition after a 3–2 aggregate loss. Malacarne also scored an important goal for Dinamo Tirana in the 1st match of the second qualifying leg of UEFA Champions League against Sheriff Tiraspol, after a corner kick shot by Elis Bakaj. This goal kept the 'blues'of Tirana in game for qualifying to the next UEFA Champions League leg, but the victory 1–0 against the moldavians wasn't enough. Malacarne has also scored a goal, again with a header against KF Skënderbeu Korçë in Qemal Stafa Stadium, as Dinamo Tirana won 3–0. Also the Argentinian defender scored an important goal against KF Laçi, as the home team of KF Laçi was putting the capital team under pressure. Malacarne has also scored a goal at the friendly match to Prohorje(Slovenia), Dinamo Tirana-Nacional Madeira, by scoring with header after a corner kick. Malacarne also has scored a goal during the season 2010–2011, at the match which took place in Tirana against KS Bylis Ballsh, by scoring with a header after a corner kick.

The Argentine's league debut was put on hold after an injury to his arm which made him until 13 September 2009 to make his Albanian Superliga in a home match against KS Teuta Durrës. Malacarne proved that he was enjoying life in Albania and put in another good display which was complemented by his 30th-minute goal that sealed the win for his new club. The goal came from a corner taken by Elis Bakaj; Malacarne managed to get his head to it and put it past the KS Teuta Durrës keeper, Bledar Vashaku.
