= Mladen Brkić =

Serbian footballer

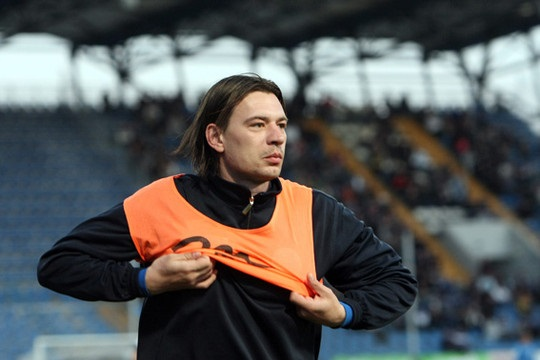
- Brkić in 2012

Personal information
- Full name: Mladen Brkić
- Date of birth: 30 October 1980 (age 46)
- Place of birth: Zaječar, SFR Yugoslavia (modern Serbia)
- Height: 1.86 m (6 ft 1 in)
- Position: Striker

Senior career*
Years	Team	Apps	(Gls)
2001	Mladenovac	17	(2)
2002–2003	Timok	25	(7)
2003–2005	Železnik	0	(0)
2003–2004	→ Radnički Beograd (loan)	1	(0)
2004	→ Železničar Beograd (loan)	10	(3)
2005	→ Sevojno (loan)	13	(1)
2005–2006	Selevac		
2006–2007	Mladenovac	31	(11)
2007	ČSK Čelarevo	15	(3)
2008	SV Gmunden	14	(0)
2008–2010	Apolonia Fier	60	(24)
2010–2011	Skënderbeu Korçë	16	(8)
2011	→ Dinamo Tirana (loan)	14	(3)
2011	Flamurtari	10	(0)
2012	Zalaegerszegi TE	8	(1)
2012	Lapta Türk Birliği	12	(3)
2013	Sloga Kraljevo	13	(1)
2013	Šumadija Jagnjilo	3	(1)
2013–2014	Laçi	25	(4)
2014–2015	Karađorđe Topola		
2016	Räppe GoIF	6	(2)
2017	Šumadija Aranđelovac		
- * Club domestic league appearances and goals as of 16 March 2017

Mladen Brkić (Serbian Cyrillic: Младен Бркић; born October 30, 1980) is a Serbian former professional footballer who plays as a striker.

== Club career ==
=== Apolonia Fier ===
Brkić presented himself in Albania for the first time in the 2008–09 season where he scored 9 goals in 30 matches with Apolonia Fier. He improved during the next season, scoring 15 goals in 30 matches, missing out "Golden Boot" to Daniel Xhafa for 3 goals. In January 2010 he was also named the new team captain.

Brkić was loaned out to Dinamo Tirana for the club's participation in the UEFA Europa League; he played in the first leg of first qualifying round against FC Lahti which ended 4–1 to the Finnish side.

=== Skënderbeu Korçë ===
On 14 August 2010, Brkić was signed by Skënderbeu Korçë on a one-year contract worth €50,000. He scored in a friendly just four days later against Pogradeci. Brkić scored his first Albanian Superliga hat-trick on 24 October 2010 in a 5–1 home win over Kastrioti Krujë in the matchday 8. The feat was followed by braces against Dinamo Tirana and Besa Kavajë which brought the striker tally to 7 goals. He finished the first part of the season as Skënderbeu to scorer with 8 goals in 16 appearances, in addition 1 goal in 1 cup appearance before leaving in January.

==== Dinamo Tirana (loan) ====
In January 2011 Brkić joined a half-season loan at Dinamo Tirana, returning at capital club after two-and-a-half years. As part of the transfer, Albanian midfielder Gjergji Muzaka went to the opposite direction.

=== Flamurtari Vlorë ===
Brkić agreed personal terms and joined fellow top flight side Flamurtari on 15 September 2011 on a one-year contract. His spell at Red&Blacks was short-lived, as he went goalless in 10 league appearances. He did, however, scored once in Albanian Cup on 28 September versus lower league opposition Bilisht Sport. He left the club in the first days of January after terminating the contract.

=== Zalaegerszegi TE ===
On 15 March 2012, after three months as a free agent, Brkić left Albania and joined Zalaegerszegi TE of Nemzeti Bajnokság I. He signed a contract until the end of the 2011–12 season and took squad number 11. Brkić made his competitive two days later by entering as a substitute in the final minutes of the 1–1 home draw against Szombathelyi Haladás. His first score-sheet contributions came in his second appearance for the club on 24 March against Vasas SC, netting a volley in 76th minute to give his team the temporary lead in an eventual 2–3 loss at Illovszky Rudolf Stadion. Brkić finished his short spell in Hungary by making 8 appearances and scoring once, as Zalaegerszegi TE was relegated to Nemzeti Bajnokság II after finishing last in the championship.

=== Laçi ===
Brkić completed a transfer to Albanian Superliga outfit Laçi on 29 August 2013, returning in Albania after two seasons. He made his debut on 14 September in the opening week of championship versus Partizani Tirana, producing a strong performance and assisted the lone goal before was replaced at extra time as Laçi won at home. He opened his scoring account later on 6 November in a cup match against Elbasani, netting the opener with a penalty kick as Laçi won 2–0. His first league goal came three days later as he scored the first of a 0–2 win at Kastrioti Krujë. He left the club on 14 April of the following year due to his poor performances throughout the season, having scored only 4 goals in 25 league appearances.

== Career statistics ==
As of 5 May 2015

Club statistics
Club	Season	League			Cup		Europe		Total	
Club	Season	Division	Apps	Goals	Apps	Goals	Apps	Goals	Apps	Goals
Gmunden	2007–08	Wiener Stadtliga	7	0	0	0	—		7	0
Gmunden	2008–09	Wiener Stadtliga	7	0	0	0	—		7	0
Gmunden	Total		14	0			—		14	0
Apolonia Fier	2008–09	Albanian Superliga	30	9	2	1	—		32	10
Apolonia Fier	2009–10	Albanian Superliga	30	15	0	0	—		30	15
Apolonia Fier	Total		60	24	2	1	—		62	25
Dinamo Tirana (loan)	2009–10	Albanian Superliga	—		—		1 (Note: All appearance(s) in UEFA Europa League)	0	1	0
Skënderbeu Korçë	2010–11	Albanian Superliga	16	8	1	1	—		17	9
Dinamo Tirana (loan)	2010–11	Albanian Superliga	14 (Note: Not including one appearance in Albanian Superliga relegation play-off)	3	4	0	—		18	3
Flamurtari	2011–12	Albanian Superliga	10	0	5	0	—		15	0
Zalaegerszegi	2011–12	Nemzeti Bajnokság I	8	1	0	0	—		8	1
Lapta Türk Birliği	2012–13	KTFF Süper Lig	12	3	0	0	—		12	3
Sloga Kraljevo	2012–13	Serbian First League	13	1	0	0	—		13	1
Laçi	2013–14	Albanian Superliga	25	4	3	1	—		28	5
Career total			172	44	15	3	1	0	188	47
