= Néstor Martinena =

Argentine footballer (born 1987)

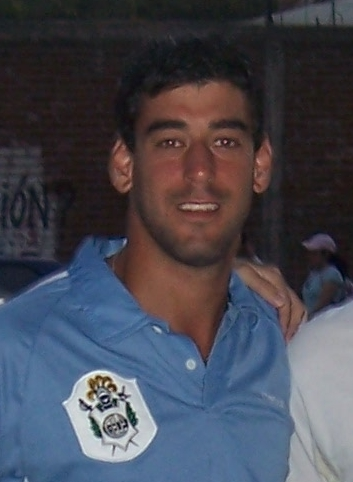

Personal information
- Full name: Néstor Gabriel Martinena
- Date of birth: January 22, 1987 (age 39)
- Place of birth: Necochea, Argentina
- Height: 1.88 m (6 ft 2 in)
- Position: Forward

Team information
- Current team: Círculo Deportivo

Youth career
- Gimnasia de La Plata

Senior career*
Years	Team	Apps	(Gls)
2007–2010	Gimnasia de La Plata		
2010–2011	Dinamo Tirana	27	(6)
2011–2012	Defensa y Justicia	26	(4)
2012–2013	Platense	12	(0)
2013	Cobresal	7	(0)
2013–2015	Gimnasia de Jujuy	35	(3)
2015–2016	Boca Unidos	28	(3)
2016	Brown de Adrogué	6	(0)
2016–2017	Sportivo Belgrano	6	(0)
2017	Fuerza Amarilla	16	(1)
2017–2018	Sportivo Desamparados	18	(1)
2018–2019	Kamza	20	(1)
2019–	Círculo Deportivo	2	(0)
- * Club domestic league appearances and goals as of 00:42, 16 September 2019 (UTC)

Néstor Gabriel Martinena (born 22 January 1987 in Necochea, Buenos Aires) is an Argentine football forward currently playing for Club Círculo Deportivo. He has spent all of his career prior to moving to Dinamo with Gimnasia de La Plata.
