= 2016–17 KF Luftëtari season =

Luftëtari Gjirokastër
2016–17 season
- Chairman: Zamira Rami
- Manager: Mladen Milinković
- Stadium: Adush Muça Stadium (August to November) (Note: Luftëtari Gjirokastër's matches are played at Bylis Ballsh's Adush Muça Stadium between August and November due to renovations at their Gjirokastër Stadium.); Gjirokastër Stadium (November to May) (Note: Luftëtari Gjirokastër's matches are played at Gjirokastër Stadium from November onwards due to renovations at the aforementioned stadium between August and November.)
- Kategoria Superiore: 4th
- Albanian Cup: 2nd Round
Home colours	Away colours

This article covers the 2016–17 season for Luftëtari Gjirokastër. They participate in the Kategoria Superiore and the Albanian Cup.

== Squad ==
=== First team squad ===
As of 12 August 2016.

Note: Flags indicate national team as defined under FIFA eligibility rules; some limited exceptions apply. Players may hold more than one non-FIFA nationality.

No.	Pos.	Nation	Player
1	GK	ALB	Festim Miraka
4	DF	ALB	Oltion Rrapaj
5	MF	ALB	Albano Aleksi
8	DF	ALB	Ergis Mersini
11	DF	ALB	Donald Rrapo
14	MF	ALB	Eduart Rroca
16	MF	ALB	Behar Ramadani

No.	Pos.	Nation	Player
19	DF	ALB	Lejdi Liçaj
20	DF	ALB	Orjand Beqiri
—	GK	ALB	Shkëlzen Ruçi
—	MF	ALB	Dejvi Bregu
—	MF	ALB	Kristal Abazaj
—	MF	ANG	Silas Daniel Satonho
—	FW	ALB	Alemao Zdrava

== Transfers ==
=== In ===
Date	Pos.	Name	From	Fee
1 July 2016	FW	(Albania) Alemao Zdrava	(Albania) Lushnja	Undisclosed
24 July 2016	GK	(Albania) Shkëlzen Ruçi	(Albania) Bylis Ballsh	Undisclosed
28 July 2016	MF	(Angola) Silas Daniel Satonho	(Angola) CRD Libolo	Undisclosed

=== Out ===
Date	Pos.	Name	To	Fee
1 July 2016	MF	(Albania) Agim Meto	(Albania) Korabi Peshkopi	Undisclosed

== Pre-season and friendlies ==
3 August Friendly	PAE Kerkyra (Greece)	1–0	(Albania) Luftëtari Gjirokastër	Corfu, Greece
19:00 CET	K. Georgakopoulos 14'	Report

10 August Friendly	Luftëtari Gjirokastër (Albania)	3–0	(Albania) Lushnja	Gjirokastër, Albania
17:00 CET	K. Abazaj 26'; D. Bregu 37', 90' (pen.)	Report

== Competitions ==
=== Kategoria Superiore ===
==== League table ====
Pos	Team	Pld	W	D	L	GF	GA	GD	Pts	Qualification or relegation
2	Partizani	36	19	15	2	46	17	+29	72 (Note: Partizani ahead of Skënderbeu on head-to-head record; Partizani–Skënderbeu 0–0, Skënderbeu–Partizani 1–2, Partizani–Skënderbeu 1–0, Skënderbeu–Partizani 2–2.)	Qualification for the Europa League first qualifying round
3	Skënderbeu	36	21	9	6	45	22	+23	72	Qualification for the Europa League first qualifying round
4	Luftëtari	36	11	11	14	37	45	−8	44	
5	Teuta	36	10	10	16	27	34	−7	40	
6	Laçi	36	10	10	16	23	35	−12	40	

Source: Albanian Football Association (in Albanian), Soccerway
Rules for classification: 1) Points; 2) Head-to-head points; 3) Head-to-head goal difference; 4) Head-to-head goals scored; 5) Goal difference; 6) Goals scored; 7) Draw.

==== Results summary ====
Overall								Home						Away					
Pld	W	D	L	GF	GA	GD	Pts	W	D	L	GF	GA	GD	W	D	L	GF	GA	GD
36	11	11	14	37	45	−8	44	7	9	2	20	13	+7	4	2	12	17	32	−15

Last updated: 27 May 2017.

==== Results by round ====
Round	1	2	3	4	5	6	7	8	9	10	11	12	13	14	15	16	17	18	19	20	21	22	23	24	25	26	27	28	29	30	31	32	33	34	35	36
Ground	A	A	A	A	H	H	A	H	A	H	H	H	H	A	A	H	A	H	H	A	H	A	H	H	A	H	A	A	H	A	H	A	A	H	A	H
Result	L	L	W	L	W	D	L	W	L	D	D	D	D	D	W	W	L	D	W	L	W	L	D	D	W	W	L	L	L	W	L	L	D	D	L	W
Position	10	10	7	8	6	6	6	6	6	7	6	6	6	6	6	5	5	5	5	5	4	4	4	4	4	4	4	4	5	4	4	4	4	4	4	4

Source: Soccerway
A = Away; H = Home; W = Win; D = Draw; L = Loss

==== Matches ====
Win Draw Loss

7 September 2016 1	Partizani Tirana	1–0	Luftëtari Gjirokastër	Elbasan
19:00 CET	Atanda (yellow card) 36'; Trashi (yellow card) 44'; Batha 90+3' (pen.)	Report	Aleksi (yellow card) 23'; Beqiri (yellow card) 33'; Mersini (yellow card) 53'; Boyom (red card) 90+2'	Stadium: Elbasan Arena; Attendance: 1,000; Referee: Andi Koçi

11 September 2016 2	Flamurtari Vlorë	5–0	Luftëtari Gjirokastër	Vlorë
19:00 CET	Shkodra 3', 64'; Bušić 9'; Galić 34' (yellow card) 60'; Telushi (yellow card) 52'; Shehaj 72'	Report	B. Ramadani (yellow card) 8'; Rapa (yellow card) 45+2'	Stadium: Flamurtari Stadium; Attendance: 2,000; Referee: Adrian Beqiri

17 September 2016 3	Korabi Peshkopi	0–1	Luftëtari Gjirokastër	Elbasan
14:00 CET	Nako (yellow card) 90+4'	Report	Aleksi (yellow card) 19'; Montero (yellow card) 63' (goal) 67'; B. Ramadani (yellow card) 77'	Stadium: Elbasan Arena; Referee: Olsi Sokoli

24 September 2016 4	Skënderbeu Korçë	1–0	Luftëtari Gjirokastër	Korçë
17:00 CET	Adeniyi 28'; Fukui (yellow card) 46'	Report	Aleksi (yellow card) 22'	Stadium: Skënderbeu Stadium; Attendance: 4,000; Referee: Kreshnik Cjapi

1 October 2016 5	Luftëtari Gjirokastër	1–0	Laçi	Ballsh
17:00 CET	Liçaj (yellow card) 17'; Montero (yellow card) 45'; Rapa (yellow card) 52'; B. Ramadani 90+3' (pen.)	Report	Bruno Aquino (yellow card) 26'; Alechenwu (yellow card) 55' (yellow-red card) 90+3'; Musaj (yellow card) 64'; Pericles (yellow card) 81'	Stadium: Adush Muça Stadium; Attendance: 300; Referee: Laver Alla

12 October 2016 6	Luftëtari Gjirokastër	1–1	Vllaznia Shkodër	Peqin
14:00 CET	Abazaj 9'; B. Ramadani (yellow card) 75'	Report	Shtubina 22'; Bardulla (yellow card) 66'; Cicmil (yellow card) 77'; Vecaj (yellow card) 87'	Stadium: Shkumbini Stadium; Attendance: 50; Referee: Kreshnik Cjapi

17 October 2016 7	Teuta Durrës	2–0	Luftëtari Gjirokastër	Durrës
17:00 CET	Bangal 23'; Shkalla (yellow card) 54'; Rashica (yellow card) 55'; Magani (yellow card) 72'; Çyrbja 82'	Report	Liçaj (yellow card) 59'; Abazaj (yellow card) 74'	Stadium: Niko Dovana Stadium; Attendance: 700; Referee: Laver Alla

23 October 2016 8	Luftëtari Gjirokastër	2–1	Tirana	Peqin
13:00 CET	B. Ramadani (yellow card) 23'; Reginaldo 40'; Bregu 57'	Report	Taku 45'	Stadium: Shkumbini Stadium; Attendance: 500; Referee: Emirjon Sino

29 October 2016 9	Kukesi	1–0	Luftëtari Gjirokastër	Kukës
14:00 CET	Emini 61'; Greca (yellow card) 61'; Shameti (yellow card) 60'	Report	Mersini (yellow card) 56'; Aleksi (yellow card) 88'	Stadium: Zeqir Ymeri Stadium; Attendance: 800; Referee: Olsi Sokoli

5 November 2016 10	Luftëtari Gjirokastër	1–1	Partizani Tirana	Gjirokastër
14:00 CET	B. Ramadani (yellow card) 37'; Bregu 57' (yellow card) 57'; Liçaj (yellow card) 68' (yellow-red card) 87'	Report	Bardhi (yellow card) 45'; Malota (yellow card) 50'; Ibrahimi 72'	Stadium: Gjirokastra Stadium; Attendance: 5,200; Referee: Kridens Meta

20 November 2016 11	Luftëtari Gjirokastër	1–1	Flamurtari Vlorë	Gjirokastër
14:00 CET	Aleksi (yellow card) 43'; Reginaldo 50' (yellow card) 54'; Faye (yellow card) 90'	Report	Dushku (yellow card) 43'; Galić 82'; Zeqiri (yellow card) 84'; Marku (yellow card) 90+2'	Stadium: Gjirokastra Stadium; Attendance: 2,500; Referee: Adrian Beqiri

26 November 2016 12	Luftëtari Gjirokastër	1–1	Korabi Peshkopi	Gjirokastër
14:00 CET	Reginaldo 1'	Report	Veliaj (yellow card) 35'; Mziu 56'; Sheta (yellow card) 82'	Stadium: Gjirokastra Stadium; Attendance: 360; Referee: Laver Alla

30 November 2016 13	Luftëtari Gjirokastër	0–0	Skënderbeu Korçë	Gjirokastër
14:00 CET	Brahimaj (yellow card) 21'; Bregu (yellow card) 36'; B. Ramadani (yellow card) 83'	Report	Mustafa (yellow card) 20'; Serginho (yellow card) 54'; Latifi (yellow card) 61'; Orelesi (yellow card) 75'	Stadium: Gjirokastra Stadium; Attendance: 2,000; Referee: Kreshnik Cjapi

4 December 2016 14	Laçi	2–2	Luftëtari Gjirokastër	Laç
14:00 CET	Bruno Aquino 23', 90'; Lulaj (yellow card) 50'; Lipi (yellow card) 84' (yellow-red card) 90+3'	Report	Boyom 6' (yellow card) 90+3'; Bregu 9'; Beqiri (yellow card) 36' (yellow-red card) 44'; Ruçi (yellow card) 74'	Stadium: Laçi Stadium; Attendance: 130; Referee: Laver Alla

10 December 2016 15	Vllaznia Shkodër	2–3	Luftëtari Gjirokastër	Shkodër
14:00 CET	Shtubina 12'; Marku 28'	Report	Cicmil 6' (o.g.); Reginaldo 24', 74'; Rapa (yellow card) 53'; Liçaj (yellow card) 70'; Brahimaj (yellow card) 90+3'	Stadium: Loro Boriçi Stadium; Attendance: 900; Referee: Adrian Beqiri

14 December 2016 16	Luftëtari Gjirokastër	1–0	Teuta Durrës	Gjirokastër
14:00 CET	Rapo (yellow card) 27'; Bregu 69'; B. Ramadani (yellow card) 90+3'	Report	Shkalla (yellow card) 43'; Hila (yellow card) 65'	Stadium: Gjirokastra Stadium; Attendance: 500; Referee: Eldorjan Hamiti

18 December 2016 17	Tirana	2–0	Luftëtari Gjirokastër	Tirana
14:00 CET	Taku 45+1'; Ndockyt 75'	Report		Stadium: Selman Stërmasi Stadium; Attendance: 600; Referee: Emirjon Sino

22 December 2016 18	Luftëtari Gjirokastër	2–2	Kukesi	Gjirokastër
14:00 CET	Reginaldo 5'; B. Ramadani (yellow card) 35'; Bregu (yellow card) 81'; Rapo 88'	Report	Pejić 36' (pen.); Imami (yellow card) 60'; Emini 66'; Lena (yellow card) 84'; Dema (yellow card) 90+2'	Stadium: Gjirokastra Stadium; Attendance: 450; Referee: Klajdi Kola

28 January 2017 19	Luftëtari Gjirokastër	2–0	Partizani Tirana	Gjirokastër
14:00 CET	Zguro (yellow card) 23'; B. Ramadani 44' (pen.); Abazaj 65'; Reginaldo (yellow card) 75'; Rapa (yellow card) 87'	Report	Kalari (yellow card) 29'; Atanda (yellow card) 44'; Krasniqi (yellow card) 75'	Stadium: Gjirokastra Stadium; Referee: Juxhin Xhaja

6 February 2017 20	Flamurtari Vlorë	2–1	Luftëtari Gjirokastër	Vlorë
17:00 CET	Veliu 25'; Jakovljević (yellow card) 35'; Bušić 45'	Report	Liçaj (yellow card) 13'; Beqiri (yellow card) 43'; Rroca 63'; Zguro (yellow card) 72'; Boyom (yellow card) 78'; Abazaj (yellow card) 85'	Stadium: Flamurtari Stadium; Attendance: 1,000; Referee: Eldorjan Hamiti

12 February 2017 21	Luftëtari Gjirokastër	2–0	Korabi Peshkopi	Gjirokastër
14:00 CET	B. Ramadani (yellow card) 34' (yellow-red card) 61'; Beqiri (yellow card) 49'; Bregu 54'; Abazaj 59' (yellow card) 82'; Liçaj (yellow card) 61'; Boyom (yellow card) 90+3'	Report	Zefi (red card) 61'; Prençi (yellow card) 70'; Mziu (yellow card) 87'	Stadium: Gjirokastra Stadium; Attendance: 2,531; Referee: Lorenc Jemini

19 February 2017 22	Skënderbeu Korçë	3–0	Luftëtari Gjirokastër	Korçë
17:00 CET	Jashanica (yellow card) 21'; Muzaka 25'; Latifi 36'; Radaš (yellow card) 62' (goal) 75'; Mici (yellow card) 63'	Report	Rapo (yellow card) 30'; Aleksi (yellow card) 47'; Rapa (yellow card) 60'	Stadium: Skënderbeu Stadium; Attendance: 2,000; Referee: Juxhin Xhaja

25 February 2017 23	Luftëtari Gjirokastër	1–1	Laçi	Gjirokastër
14:00 CET	B. Ramadani 14' (pen.); Abazaj (yellow card) 25'; Bregu (yellow card) 33'; Zguro (yellow card) 63'; Rroca (yellow card) 71'	Report	Lushkja (yellow card) 28' (yellow-red card) 75'; Qaqi (yellow card) 40'; Jonuzi 64'; Sefgjinaj (yellow card) 78'; Musaj (yellow card) 79'; Selmani (yellow card) 89'	Stadium: Gjirokastra Stadium; Attendance: 300; Referee: Remzi Sadiku

4 March 2017 24	Luftëtari Gjirokastër	0–0	Vllaznia Shkodër	Gjirokastër
14:00 CET	Bregu (yellow card) 5'; Reginaldo (yellow card) 55'; Beqiri (yellow card) 60'; Liçaj (yellow card) 66'	Report	Krymi (yellow card) 17'; Bakaj (yellow card) 66'; Kalaja (yellow card) 68'; Vecaj (yellow card) 68'; Vrapi (yellow card) 90'	Stadium: Gjirokastra Stadium; Attendance: 2,000; Referee: Emirjon Sino

12 March 2017 25	Teuta Durrës	0–1	Luftëtari Gjirokastër	Durrës
17:00 CET	Bangal (yellow card) 23'	Report	Mutumane (yellow card) 7'; Rroca 22'; Lamçja (yellow card) 38'; Rapa (yellow card) 45+1'	Stadium: Niko Dovana Stadium; Attendance: 300; Referee: Eldorjan Hamiti

19 March 2017 26	Luftëtari Gjirokastër	2–1	Tirana	Gjirokastër
14:00 CET	Bregu (yellow card) 31' (goal) 72'; Zguro (yellow card) 35' (yellow-red card) 74'; Rroca (yellow card) 36'; Lamçja (yellow card) 55' (goal) 58'; Ruçi (yellow card) 90+3'	Report	Teqja (yellow card) 57'; Cissé 90+1'	Stadium: Gjirokastra Stadium; Attendance: 3,000; Referee: Juxhin Xhaja

2 April 2017 27	Kukesi	3–2	Luftëtari Gjirokastër	Kukës
16:00 CET	Shameti 4' (yellow card) 89'; Boyom 21' (o.g.); Pejić 29'; Elton Calé (yellow card) 44'; Hallaçi (yellow card) 83'	Report	Lamçja 8'; Beqiri 80'; Pedro Bengui (yellow card) 83'; Reginaldo (yellow card) 85'; Boyom (yellow card) 88'	Stadium: Zeqir Ymeri Stadium; Attendance: 3,000; Referee: Enea Jorgji

8 April 2017 28	Partizani Tirana	2–0	Luftëtari Gjirokastër	Elbasan
19:00 CET	Batha 5' (pen.); Y. Ramadani (yellow card) 20'; Ekuban 43'; Kalari (yellow card) 68'	Report	Mutumane (yellow card) 35' (yellow-red card) 40'	Stadium: Elbasan Arena; Attendance: 2,031; Referee: Lorenc Jemini

16 April 2017 29	Luftëtari Gjirokastër	1–2	Flamurtari Vlorë	Gjirokastër
16:00 CET	Bregu 10'; Aleksi (yellow card) 26'; Beqiri (yellow card) 50'; Rapo (yellow card) 57'	Report	Telushi (yellow card) 26' (goal) 89' (pen.); Shkodra (yellow card) 44' (goal) 70'; Neziraj (yellow card) 84'	Stadium: Gjirokastra Stadium; Attendance: 3,000; Referee: Enea Jorgji

22 April 2017 30	Korabi Peshkopi	0–4	Luftëtari Gjirokastër	Elbasan
16:00 CET	Zefi (yellow card) 7'; Mziu (yellow card) 7'; Kaloshi (yellow card) 11'; Arifaj (yellow card) 25'; Shabani (yellow card) 71'; Kraja (yellow card) 89'	Report	Brahimaj (yellow card) 13' (goal) 30'; Zguro (yellow card) 45'; Bregu 47'; Pedro Bengui 87' (yellow card) 90+2'; Reginaldo 87'	Stadium: Elbasan Arena; Attendance: 50; Referee: Adrian Beqiri

30 April 2017 31	Luftëtari Gjirokastër	0–1	Skënderbeu Korçë	Gjirokastër
16:00 CET	Aleksi (yellow card) 28'; B. Ramadani (yellow card) 65'; Rapa (yellow card) 73'; Lamçja (yellow card) 82'	Report	Gavazaj (yellow card) 35'; Adeniyi (yellow card) 45+1' (goal) 49'; Orelesi (yellow card) 80'	Stadium: Gjirokastra Stadium; Attendance: 1,000; Referee: Eldorjan Hamiti

6 May 2017 32	Laçi	2–1	Luftëtari Gjirokastër	Laç
16:00 CET	Bruno Aquino 23', 90'; Lulaj (yellow card) 50'; Lipi (yellow card) 84' (yellow-red card) 90+3'	Report	Aleksi 16' (pen.); Zguro (yellow card) 18'; Abazaj (yellow card) 30'; Brahimaj (yellow card) 70'; Zogaj (yellow card) 90+5'	Stadium: Laçi Stadium; Attendance: 1,000; Referee: Juxhin Xhaja

10 May 2017 33	Vllaznia Shkodër	2–2	Luftëtari Gjirokastër	Shkodër
16:00 CET	Bakaj (yellow card) 30' (goal) 34' (pen.); Gurishta (yellow card) 36'; Tafili (yellow card) 64'; Vrapi (yellow card) 83'; Shtubina 90+3'	Report	Liçaj (yellow card) 14'; Beqiri (yellow card) 30'; Rapa (yellow card) 39'; Boyom 44'; Reginaldo 50'; Lamçja (yellow card) 64'	Stadium: Loro Boriçi Stadium; Attendance: 900; Referee: Emirjon Sino

15 May 2017 34	Luftëtari Gjirokastër	1–1	Teuta Durrës	Gjirokastër
16:00 CET	B. Ramadani (yellow card) 36' (goal) 85' (pen.); Miraka (yellow card) 87'; Liçaj (yellow card) 90+2'	Report	Sykaj (yellow card) 19'; Kastrati (yellow card) 80'; Beqja (yellow card) 83'; Bangal 90+6'	Stadium: Gjirokastra Stadium; Attendance: 1,000; Referee: Laver Alla

20 May 2017 35	Tirana	2–0	Luftëtari Gjirokastër	Tirana
17:30 CET	Edeh 45'; Ndockyt 85'	Report	Brahimaj (yellow card) 23'; Beqiri (yellow card) 32'; Aleksi (yellow card) 47'; Mutumane (yellow card) 69'	Stadium: Selman Stërmasi Stadium; Attendance: 2,500; Referee: Kridens Meta

27 May 2017 36	Luftëtari Gjirokastër	1–0	Kukesi	Gjirokastër
17:00 CET	Bregu 11' (pen.) (yellow card) 12'; Beqiri (yellow card) 79'	Report		Stadium: Gjirokastra Stadium; Attendance: 1,000; Referee: Klodian Shahini

=== Albanian Cup ===
==== First round ====
28 September 2016 First leg	Elbasani	0–1	Luftëtari Gjirokastër	Elbasan
16:00 CET	Dosti (yellow card) 70'; Toçi (yellow card) 87'; Sulejmani (yellow card) 90' (yellow-red card) 90'	Report	Dany 30'; Faye (yellow card) 50'	Stadium: Elbasan Arena; Attendance: 200; Referee: Skerdi Greca

5 October 2016 Second leg	Luftëtari Gjirokastër	2–2 (3–2 agg.)	Elbasani	Elbasan
14:00 CET	Faye 5' (yellow card) 27'; Zogaj (yellow card) 50'; Bregu 90+3'	Report	Agastra 11'; Shehaj 50'; Ramadani (yellow card) 79'; Toçi (yellow card) 86'; Luta (yellow card) 90+3'; Vllahi (yellow card) 90+4'	Stadium: Elbasan Arena; Attendance: 50; Referee: Hermal Llapra

==== Second round ====
26 October 2016 First leg	Luftëtari Gjirokastër	1–4	Tirana	Lushnje
14:00 CET	Zogaj 21'; Liçaj (yellow card) 89'	Report	Nika 46'; Cissé 52', 61', 78'; Bajrami (yellow card) 59'	Stadium: Abdurrahman Roza Haxhiu Stadium; Attendance: 80; Referee: Olsid Ferataj

16 November 2016 Second leg	Tirana	1–0 (5–1 agg.)	Luftëtari Gjirokastër	Tirana
13:30 CET	Vucaj 11'	Report	Zogaj (yellow card) 66'; Boyom (yellow card) 85'	Stadium: Selman Stërmasi Stadium; Attendance: 500; Referee: Andi Koçi
