= 2017–18 KF Luftëtari season =

Luftëtari Gjirokastër
2017–18 season
- Chairman: Grigor Tavo
- Manager: Hasan Lika
- Stadium: Gjirokastër Stadium
- Kategoria Superiore: 3rd
- Albanian Cup: Quarter-finals
Home colours	Away colours

This article covers the 2017–18 season for Luftëtari Gjirokastër. They participate in the Albanian Superliga and the Albanian Cup.

== Current squad ==
As of 18 October 2017

Note: Flags indicate national team as defined under FIFA eligibility rules; some limited exceptions apply. Players may hold more than one non-FIFA nationality.

No.	Pos.	Nation	Player
1	GK	ALB	Festim Miraka
2	DF	URU	Bruno Nicolás Toledo Dante
3	DF	ALB	Valdo Zeqaj
4	DF	ALB	Oltion Rapa
5	MF	ALB	Albano Aleksi
6	DF	ARG	Facundo David Nasif
8	DF	ALB	Vangjel Zguro
9	FW	ALB	Vasil Shkurtaj
10	MF	ALB	Eduart Rroca
12	GK	ALB	Shkëlzen Ruçi
13	DF	ALB	Stivian Janku
14	DF	ALB	Mikel Hoxha
15	DF	ALB	Stiven Puci

No.	Pos.	Nation	Player
16	MF	ALB	Behar Ramadani
19	FW	URU	Fabricio Núñez
20	DF	ALB	Orjand Beqiri
21	MF	ALB	Dejvi Bregu
22	MF	ALB	Silvio Zogaj
23	MF	ALB	Arsen Kasa
23	DF	ALB	Donald Rapo
25	FW	ALB	Kristal Abazaj
27	FW	ALB	Eri Lamçja
28	FW	ALB	Rudion Mahmutaj
30	MF	ALB	Brixhild Brahimaj
99	GK	ALB	Arvenold Qyrani

== Competitions ==
=== Kategoria Superiore ===
==== League table ====
Pos	Team	Pld	W	D	L	GF	GA	GD	Pts	Qualification or relegation
1	Skënderbeu (Note: In March 2018, Skënderbeu was handed a 10-year ban from UEFA club competitions over match fixing.) (C)	36	22	6	8	68	41	+27	72	
2	Kukësi	36	18	9	9	61	41	+20	63	Qualification to the Champions League first qualifying round
3	Luftëtari	36	16	11	9	47	37	+10	59	Qualification to the Europa League first qualifying round (Note: Skënderbeu qualified for the Europa League first qualifying round by winning the 2017–18 Albanian Cup. However, since they were banned from entering UEFA competitions, the spot awarded to the cup winners was passed down the league.)
4	Laçi	36	16	8	12	45	39	+6	56	Qualification to the Europa League first qualifying round
5	Partizani	36	15	8	13	41	36	+5	53	Qualification to the Europa League first qualifying round

Source: Albanian Football Association (in Albanian), Soccerway
Rules for classification: 1) Points; 2) Head-to-head points; 3) Head-to-head goal difference; 4) Head-to-head goals scored; 5) Goal difference; 6) Goals scored; 7) Draw.
(C) Champions

==== Results summary ====
Overall								Home						Away					
Pld	W	D	L	GF	GA	GD	Pts	W	D	L	GF	GA	GD	W	D	L	GF	GA	GD
36	16	11	9	47	37	+10	59	9	6	3	28	16	+12	7	5	6	19	21	−2

Last updated: 23 May 2018.

==== Results by round ====
Round	1	2	3	4	5	6	7	8	9	10	11	12	13	14	15	16	17	18	19	20	21	22	23	24	25	26	27	28	29	30	31	32	33	34	35	36
Ground	A	A	H	A	H	A	H	A	H	H	H	A	H	A	H	A	H	A	A	A	H	A	H	A	H	A	H	H	H	A	H	A	H	A	H	A
Result	L	W	D	D	L	L	L	L	W	L	D	L	D	W	W	W	W	D	W	D	D	W	W	L	W	L	W	D	W	W	W	D	D	D	W	W
Position	6	4	6	6	8	9	9	9	8	9	9	9	9	8	7	7	7	7	7	7	6	6	4	6	4	5	5	5	4	3	3	3	3	3	3	3

Source: Soccerway
A = Away; H = Home; W = Win; D = Draw; L = Loss
