= 2016–17 Korabi Peshkopi season =

Korabi Peshkopi
2016–17 season
- Chairman: Femi Meziu
- Manager: Gerd Haxhiu
- Stadium: Zeqir Imeri
- Kategoria Superiore: 10th
- Albanian Cup: 1st round
Home colours	Away colours

This article covers the 2016–17 season for Korabi Peshkopi. They'll participate in the Kategoria Superiore and Albanian Cup.

== Squad ==
=== First team squad ===
As of 9 August 2016.

Note: Flags indicate national team as defined under FIFA eligibility rules; some limited exceptions apply. Players may hold more than one non-FIFA nationality.

No.	Pos.	Nation	Player
1	GK	ALB	Elvis Kotorri
3	DF	ALB	Halim Begaj
4	DF	ALB	Klodian Melani
5	DF	ALB	Alvaro Bishaj
6	MF	ALB	Daniel Jubani
7	FW	ALB	Fation Kiri
8	MF	ALB	Florian Taku
9	FW	ALB	Samet Gjoka
10	MF	ALB	Elton Muçollari
11	FW	ALB	Sokol Mziu
13	GK	ALB	Endrit Prençi
15	DF	ALB	Izmir Pelinku
20	MF	ALB	Elio Shazivari
25	DF	ALB	Armaldo Mezini
—	DF	ALB	Elvis Prençi
—	MF	ALB	Jurgen Berberi
—	MF	ALB	Altin Hoxha
—	MF	ALB	Geraldo Kaloshi

No.	Pos.	Nation	Player
—	FW	ALB	Eriol Merdini
—	MF	ALB	Emiljano Veliaj
—	MF	ALB	Agim Meto
—	MF	ALB	Emiliano Çela
—	DF	ALB	Arjan Sheta
—	MF	ALB	Alfred Zefi
—	GK	MNE	Miroslav Vujadinović
—	MF	ALB	Meglid Mihani
—	DF	ALB	Rudin Nako
—	DF	ALB	Elvis Kaja
—	MF	ALB	Vangjel Zguro
—	DF	SRB	Duško Dukić
—	DF	ALB	Andi Prifti
—	MF	ALB	Ardit Peposhi
—	DF	ALB	Denis Peposhi
—	GK	ALB	Erkan Spahija
—	MF	ALB	Gabriele Mezini
—	GK	ALB	Ted Laço

== Transfers ==
=== In ===
Date	Pos.	Name	From	Fee
1 July 2016	MF	(Albania) Agim Meto	(Albania) Luftëtari Gjirokastër	Undisclosed
1 July 2016	MF	(Albania) Alfred Zefi	(Albania) Laçi	Undisclosed
1 July 2016	DF	(Albania) Andi Prifti	(Albania) Apolonia Fier	Undisclosed
1 July 2016	MF	(Albania) Ardit Peposhi	(Albania) Bylis Ballsh	Undisclosed
1 July 2016	DF	(Albania) Arjan Sheta	(Albania) Laçi	Undisclosed
1 July 2016	DF	(Albania) Denis Peposhi	(Albania) Kukësi	Undisclosed
1 July 2016	DF	(Serbia) Duško Dukić	(Albania) Bylis Ballsh	Undisclosed
1 July 2016	DF	(Albania) Emiliano Çela	(Albania) Laçi	Undisclosed
1 July 2016	MF	(Albania) Emiliano Veliaj	(Albania) Laçi	Undisclosed
1 July 2016	GK	(Albania) Erkan Spahija	(Albania) Kastrioti	Undisclosed
1 July 2016	MF	(Albania) Gabriele Mezini	(Albania) Sopoti Librazhd	Undisclosed
1 July 2016	GK	(Montenegro) Miroslav Vujadinović	(Albania) Laçi	Undisclosed
1 July 2016	GK	(Albania) Ted Laço	(Albania) Elbasani	Undisclosed
27 July 2016	DF	(Albania) Ervis Kaja	(Albania) Apolonia Fier	Undisclosed
27 July 2016	MF	(Albania) Meglid Mihani	(Albania) Pogradeci	Undisclosed
27 July 2016	DF	(Albania) Rudin Nako	(Albania) Apolonia Fier	Undisclosed
27 July 2016	MF	(Albania) Vangjel Zguro	(Albania) Pogradeci	Undisclosed

== Pre-season and friendlies ==
30 July Friendly	Kamza (Albania)	1–0	(Albania) Korabi Peshkopi	Kamëz, Albania
17:00 CET	F. Braho (pen.)	Report		Stadium: Kamëz Stadium

3 August Friendly	Korabi Peshkopi (Albania)	3–1	(North Macedonia) Korabi	Peshkopi, Albania
17:00 CET	E. Çela; S. Mziu; D. Jubani	Report	A. Klloboçishta	Stadium: Korabi Stadium

7 August Friendly	Korabi Peshkopi (Albania)	0–3	(Albania) Skënderbeu	Peshkopi, Albania
17:00 CET		Report	E. Gavazaj 24'; M. Fukui 38'; J. Adeniyi 85'	Stadium: Korabi Stadium; Attendance: 3,000

10 August Friendly	Liria (Kosovo)	1–0	(Albania) Korabi Peshkopi	Prizren, Kosovo
17:00 CET	M. Korenica 90'	Report		Stadium: Përparim Thaçi Stadium; Attendance: 300

12 August Friendly	Korabi Peshkopi (Albania)	v	(Albania) Kukësi
17:00 CET

== Competitions ==
=== Kategoria Superiore ===
==== League table ====
Pos	Team	Pld	W	D	L	GF	GA	GD	Pts	Qualification or relegation
6	Laçi	36	10	10	16	23	35	−12	40	
7	Vllaznia	36	8	16	12	29	35	−6	40	
8	Flamurtari (Note: Flamurtari were deducted six points for failing to fulfill financial obligations.)	36	12	10	14	42	34	+8	40	
9	Tirana (R)	36	8	15	13	29	32	−3	39	Europa League qualifying and relegation to Kategoria e Parë (Note: Tirana qualified for the Europa League first qualifying round by winning the 2016–17 Albanian Cup.)
10	Korabi (R)	36	2	7	27	11	68	−57	13	Relegation to the 2017–18 Kategoria e Parë

Source: Albanian Football Association (in Albanian), Soccerway
Rules for classification: 1) Points; 2) Head-to-head points; 3) Head-to-head goal difference; 4) Head-to-head goals scored; 5) Goal difference; 6) Goals scored; 7) Draw.
(R) Relegated

==== Results summary ====
Overall								Home						Away					
Pld	W	D	L	GF	GA	GD	Pts	W	D	L	GF	GA	GD	W	D	L	GF	GA	GD
36	2	7	27	11	68	−57	13	1	5	13	5	29	−24	1	2	14	6	39	−33

Last updated: 27 May 2017.

==== Result round by round ====
Round	1	2	3	4	5	6	7	8	9	10	11	12	13	14	15	16	17	18	19	20	21	22	23	24	25	26	27	28	29	30	31	32	33	34	35	36
Ground	H	H	H	H	A	H	A	H	A	A	A	H	A	H	A	H	A	H	H	H	A	H	A	H	A	H	A	A	A	H	A	H	A	H	A	H
Result	D	L	L	D	W	L	L	L	L	L	L	D	L	L	D	D	L	W	L	L	L	L	L	D	L	L	L	L	L	L	D	L	L	L	L	L
Position	10	10	10	10	10	10	10	10	10	10	10	10	10	10	10	10	10	10	10	10	10	10	10	10	10	10	10	10	10	10	10	10	10	10	10	10

Source: Soccerway
A = Away; H = Home; W = Win; D = Draw; L = Loss

==== Matches ====
Win Draw Loss

7 September 2016 Matchday 1	Korabi Peshkopi	0 - 0	Laçi	Tirana
16:00 CET	Kraja (yellow card) 21'; Emiljano Veliaj (yellow card) 56'; Zefi (yellow card) 90+4'	Report	Ilir Kastrati (yellow card) 63'; Bruno Agnello (yellow card) 89'	Stadium: Selman Stërmasi Stadium; Referee: (Albania) Kridens Meta

11 September 2016 Matchday 2	Korabi Peshkopi	0 - 2	Skënderbeu Korçë	Tirana
13:00 CET	Arjan Sheta (yellow card) 32'; Rudi Nako (yellow card) 64'	Report	Jashanica 13'; Radas (yellow card) 27'; Mici (yellow card) 39'; Vanjeli (yellow card) 64'; Salihi 77'	Stadium: Selman Stërmasi Stadium; Referee: (Albania) Eldorjan Hamiti

17 September 2016 Matchday 3	Korabi Peshkopi	0 - 1	Luftëtari Gjirokastër	Elbasan
14:00 CET	Rudi Nako (yellow card) 90+4'	Report	Aleksi (yellow card) 19'; Andres Montero (yellow card) 63' (goal) 67'; Ramadani (yellow card) 77'	Stadium: Elbasan Arena; Referee: (Albania) Olsi Sokoli

24 September 2016 Matchday 4	Korabi Peshkopi	0 - 0	Vllaznia Shkodër	Tirana
14:00 CET	Emiliano Çela (yellow card) 14'; Zefi (yellow card) 70'; Elvis Prençi (red card) 83'	Report	Krymi (yellow card) 40'; Bardulla (yellow card) 74'	Stadium: Selman Stërmasi Stadium; Referee: (Albania) Adrian Beqiri

=== Albanian Cup ===
28 September 2016 Last 32 First Leg	Kamza	1 - 1	Korabi Peshkopi	Kamëz
14:00 CET	Léo Lelis (yellow card) 44'; Rezi 52'; Ymeraj (yellow card) 74'; Boçi (yellow card) 88'	Report	Peposhi (yellow card) 12'; Danjel Jubani (yellow card) 42'; Miroslav Vujadinović (yellow card) 72'; Elvis Prençi 90'	Stadium: Kamëz Stadium; Attendance: 500; Referee: (Albania) Edvaldo Durmishi

5 October 2016 Last 32 Second Leg	Korabi Peshkopi	0 - 2 (1 - 3 agg.)	Kamza	Tirana
14:30 CET	Emiljano Veliaj (yellow card) 43' (yellow-red card); Gabriel Mezini (red card) 55'; Mziu (yellow card) 69'	Report	Sefa 8' (yellow card) 65'; Morina 77'	Stadium: Qendra stërvitore Skënder Halili; Referee: (Albania) Besnard Kaimi
