= 2018–19 KF Luftëtari season =

Luftëtari Gjirokastër
2018–19 season
- Chairman: Zamira Rami
- Manager: Milos Kostic (until 19 September); Gentian Mezani (from 17 September until 28 January); Julian Ahmataj (from 29 January)
- Stadium: Gjirokastër Stadium
- Kategoria Superiore: 8th
- Albanian Cup: Semi-finals
- Europa League: First qualifying round
- Top goalscorer: League: Dunga and Shkurti (7 goals); All: Ismael Dunga (10 goals)
Home colours	Away colours	Third colours

The 2018–19 season was Luftëtari Gjirokastër's 89th season active. They were competing in the Kategoria Superiore, Albanian Cup and Europa League.

== Current squad ==
As of 20 October 2018

Note: Flags indicate national team as defined under FIFA eligibility rules; some limited exceptions apply. Players may hold more than one non-FIFA nationality.

No.	Pos.	Nation	Player
1	GK	ALB	Edvan Bakaj
2	DF	ALB	Aurel Demo
4	DF	ALB	Oltion Rapa
5	MF	ALB	Albano Aleksi
6	DF	BRA	Jackson
7	MF	ALB	Realdo Fili
8	MF	ALB	Erald Hyseni
9	FW	GHA	Eric Warden
10	MF	JOR	Angelos Chanti
11	FW	ALB	Romario Cekaj
12	GK	ALB	Shkëlzen Ruçi
13	DF	ALB	Armenis Kukaj
16	MF	ALB	Behar Ramadani

No.	Pos.	Nation	Player
17	DF	ALB	Rustem Hoxha
19	MF	ALB	Elian Çelaj
22	MF	ALB	Maldin Ymeraj
23	DF	ALB	Donald Rapo
26	MF	RUS	Vladimir Yesin
27	DF	ALB	Mërgim Neziri
30	DF	ALB	Donaldo Açka
39	DF	GRE	Dimitrios Kotsonis
44	MF	ALB	Aristotel Bella
45	GK	ALB	Avernold Qyrani
90	FW	KEN	Ismael Dunga
99	MF	ALB	Aldrit Oshafi

=== Other players under contract ===
Note: Flags indicate national team as defined under FIFA eligibility rules; some limited exceptions apply. Players may hold more than one non-FIFA nationality.

No.	Pos.	Nation	Player
—	FW	ALB	Rudion Mahmutaj
—	MF	ALB	Kostantinos Kondili
—	DF	ALB	Brunild Naçi
—	DF	ALB	Klevan Kendella
—	DF	MKD	Riste Ilijovski

No.	Pos.	Nation	Player
—	FW	ALB	Sebastian Molla
—	GK	ALB	Andrea Shumeli
—	FW	ALB	Dhimiter Andoni
—	MF	ALB	Erind Jahelezi

=== Out on loan ===
Note: Flags indicate national team as defined under FIFA eligibility rules; some limited exceptions apply. Players may hold more than one non-FIFA nationality.

No.	Pos.	Nation	Player
—	DF	ALB	Stivian Janku (FK Bylis)

== Competitions ==
=== Kategoria Superiore ===
==== League table ====
Pos	Team	Pld	W	D	L	GF	GA	GD	Pts	Qualification or relegation
6	Laçi	36	12	13	11	33	30	+3	49	Qualification for the Europa League first qualifying round (Note: Since the winners of the 2018–19 Albanian Cup, Kukësi, qualified for European competition based on league position, the spot awarded to the cup winners was passed down to the sixth-placed team, Laçi, since the fourth-placed team and the fifth-placed team failed to obtain a UEFA license.)
7	Tirana	36	12	11	13	44	35	+9	47	
8	Luftëtari	36	13	8	15	37	39	−2	47	
9	Kastrioti (R)	36	12	6	18	35	53	−18	42	Relegation to the 2019–20 Kategoria e Parë
10	Kamza (Note: Kamza was excluded from the league and relegated to the Kategoria e Dytë for the next season, after a violent incident during a match against Laçi in the 24th round.) (R, D)	36	4	5	27	13	66	−53	17	Excluded from the league

Source: Albanian Football Association, Soccerway
Rules for classification: 1) Points; 2) Head-to-head points; 3) Head-to-head goal difference; 4) Head-to-head goals scored; 5) Goal difference; 6) Goals scored; 7) Draw.
(D) Disqualified; (R) Relegated

==== Results summary ====
Overall								Home						Away					
Pld	W	D	L	GF	GA	GD	Pts	W	D	L	GF	GA	GD	W	D	L	GF	GA	GD
36	13	8	15	37	39	−2	47	8	4	6	19	18	+1	5	4	9	18	21	−3

Last updated: 10 April 2026.
