= Mateos Toçi =

Albanian footballer

Personal information
- Full name: Mateos Toçi
- Date of birth: 16 May 1993 (age 33)
- Place of birth: Elbasan, Albania
- Position: Midfielder

Youth career
- 2008–2011: Elbasani

Senior career*
Years	Team	Apps	(Gls)
2010–2017	Elbasani	122	(12)
2012–2013	→ Gramshi (loan)	21	(2)
2012–2017	Elbasani	90	(11)
2017	Dinamo Tirana	4	(0)

International career^{‡}
2011–2012	Albania U19	5	(0)
- * Club domestic league appearances and goals ‡ National team caps and goals as of 3 February 2018

Mateos Toçi (born 16 May 1993) is an Albanian professional footballer who most recently played as a midfielder for Dinamo Tirana in the Albanian First Division.

== Club career ==
On 19 January 2018, Toçi returned to Elbasani after only half a season.

== Style of play ==
Toçi has been compared to former Elbasani player Dorian Bylykbashi.

== Career statistics ==
=== Club ===
As of 22 December 2017

Club statistics
Club	Season	League			Cup		Other		Total	
Club	Season	Division	Apps	Goals	Apps	Goals	Apps	Goals	Apps	Goals
Elbasani	2010–11	Albanian Superliga	9	0	0	0	—		9	0
Elbasani	2011–12	Albanian First Division	23	1	2	0	—		25	1
Elbasani	2013–14	Albanian First Division	24	1	0	0	—		24	1
Elbasani	2014–15	Albanian Superliga	26	1	2	1	—		28	2
Elbasani	2015–16	Albanian First Division	19	3	0	0	—		19	3
Elbasani	2016–17	Albanian First Division	21	6	2	0	—		23	6
Elbasani	Total		122	12	6	1	—		128	13
Gramshi (loan)	2012–13	Albanian First Division	21	2	2	0	—		23	2
Dinamo Tirana	2017–18	Albanian First Division	4	0	1	0	—		5	0
Elbasani	2017–18	Albanian Second Division	0	0	0	0	—		0	0
Career total			147	14	9	1	—		156	15

== Honours ==
Elbasani

- Albanian First Division: 2013–14
