= Emmanuel Lion Udemezue =

Nigerian footballer

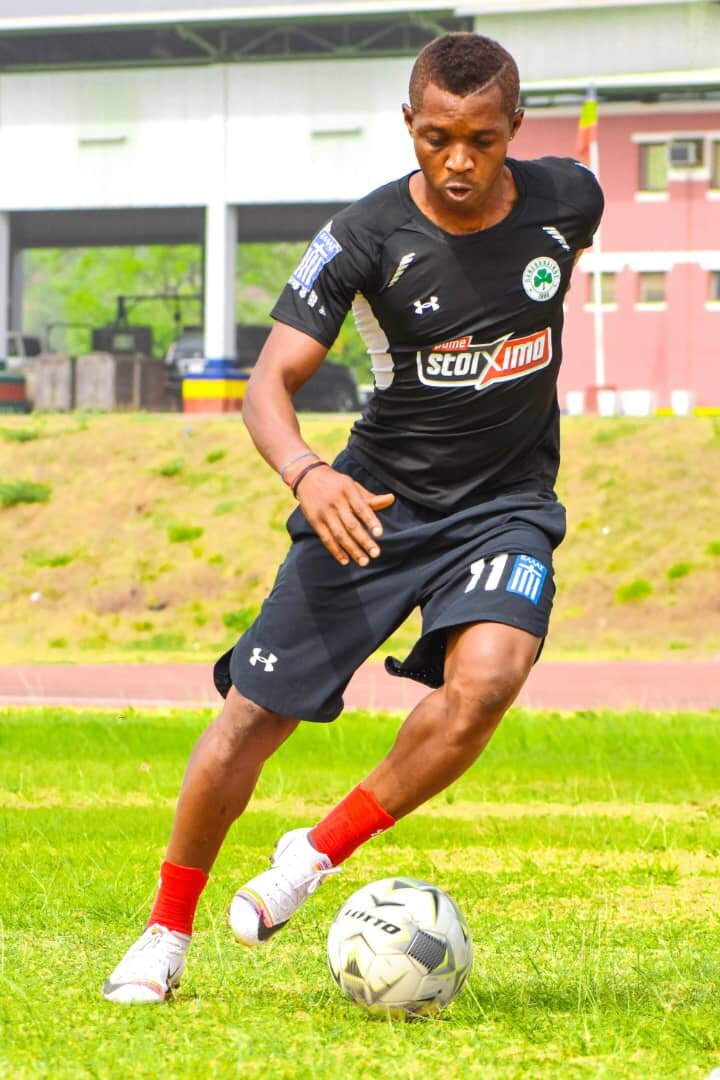

Personal information
- Full name: Emmanuel Lion Udemezue
- Date of birth: 1 January 1992 (age 34)
- Place of birth: Nigeria
- Position: Striker

Senior career*
Years	Team	Apps	(Gls)
2016–2017	KF Adriatiku Mamurras	12	(0)
- * Club domestic league appearances and goals as of 00:42, 20 June 2021 (UTC)

Emmanuel Lion Udemezue (born 1 January 1992) is a Nigerian footballer who played for KF Adriatiku Mamurras in the 2016–2017 season.
