= Sokol Mziu =

Albanian footballer

Personal information
- Full name: Sokol Mziu
- Date of birth: 21 July 1987 (age 39)
- Place of birth: Kukës, Albania
- Height: 1.71 m (5 ft 7 in)
- Position: Midfielder

Team information
- Current team: Korabi Peshkopi
- Number: 7

Senior career*
Years	Team	Apps	(Gls)
2008–2011	Mamurrasi	22+	(4+)
2011–2013	Kukësi	37	(4)
2013–2015	Tërbuni Pukë	49	(6)
2015–2017	Korabi	51	(8)
2017–2018	Kastrioti Krujë	35	(3)
2019	Besa Kavajë	11	(2)
2019–	Korabi	95	(2)
- * Club domestic league appearances and goals as of 1 June 2024

Sokol Mziu (born 21 July 1987) is an Albanian professional footballer who plays as a midfielder for Albanian club KF Korabi Peshkopi.

== Club career ==
=== Korabi Peshkopi ===
On 31 July 2015, Mziu agreed personal terms and signed a one-year contract Korabi Peshkopi in the Albanian First Division. He was given squad number 7, and debuted on 12 September in the 1–0 away loss to Besëlidhja Lezhë. He opened his scoring account later in his fifth appearance for the club, netting a late goal in the 3–0 home win versus Burreli. Later on throughout the season, Mziu was also named team captain.

He finished the 2015–16 season by playing 25 matches and scoring 7 goals, a personal best, as Korabi Peshkopi achieved promotion to Albanian Superliga by finishing first in Group A. On 19 May 2016, in the final match against Group B winners Luftëtari Gjirokastër, Mziu played the entire match which finished in a goalless draw. In the penalty shootouts, Mziu scored his team's first attempt but missed the second one when his turn came again which resulted decisive as Korabi was defeated 11–10.

On 27 July 2016, Mziu signed a new one-year contract with the club. He began his second season with the club by playing in the first half of the opening match of 2016–17 Albanian Superliga against Laçi which ended in a goalless draw at Elbasan Arena. Mziu then was benched in the following two months, returning to play as starter only in the 1–0 loss against the same opponent on 5 November 2016. Mziu scored his second-ever goal in the Albanian Superliga on 26 November in form of an equalizer in the 1–1 draw at Luftëtari Gjirokastër.

On 22 April of the following year, Korabi Peshkopi relegation was officially confirmed following the 4–0 home loss to Luftëtari Gjirokastër. On 10 May, Mziu was sent-off during the 2–0 loss to Tirana after receiving two yellow cards; it was his first ever top-flight red card. He concluded his second season with the club by making 28 appearances, 26 of them in top flight.

=== Kastrioti Krujë ===
On 31 July 2017, Mziu was presented as Kastrioti Krujë newest player by signing a contract for the 2017–18 season. With the number 18, he made his official debut on 16 September in the opening matchday against Burreli which ended in a 2–0 away win. His first score-sheet contributions came later on 23 October in the 3–1 home win against his former side Korabi Peshkopi, with Mziu netting the third of the match.

Mziu proved to be an important instrument in Samuel Nikaj's team as he played 25 league matches and scored twice to help Kastrioti top Group A which meant the return to Albanian Superliga after four years. In the final championship match against Group B winners Tirana, Mziu played full-90 minutes but didn't avoided the 2–0 loss at Elbasan Arena.

On 1 August 2018, Mziu signed a new one-year contract with the club. He began the season on 18 August by netting a penalty kick in the 1–0 win at Luftëtari Gjirokastër in the opening week of 2018–19 Albanian Superliga.

=== Besa Kavajë ===
On 29 December 2018 it was confirmed, that Mziu had signed with Besa Kavajë.

== Career statistics ==
As of 18 August 2018

Club statistics
Club	Season	League			Cup		Europe		Other		Total	
Club	Season	Division	Apps	Goals	Apps	Goals	Apps	Goals	Apps	Goals	Apps	Goals
Adriatiku Mamurras	2010–11	Albanian First Division	0	0	0	0	—		1 (Note: All appearance(s) in Albanian Superliga relegation playoffs)	0	1	0
Kukësi	2011–12	Albanian First Division	26	3	0	0	—		—		26	3
Kukësi	2012–13	Albanian Superliga	11	1	4	0	—		—		15	1
Kukësi	2013–14	Albanian Superliga	—		—		2 (Note: All appearance(s) in UEFA Europa League)	0	—		2	0
Kukësi	Total		37	4	4	1	2	0	—		43	5
Tërbuni Pukë	2013–14	Albanian First Division	23	3	0	0	—		—		23	3
Tërbuni Pukë	2014–15	Albanian First Division	26	3	2	0	—		—		28	3
Tërbuni Pukë	Total		49	6	2	0	—		—		51	6
Korabi Peshkopi	2015–16	Albanian First Division	25	7	0	0	—		—		25	7
Korabi Peshkopi	2016–17	Albanian Superliga	26	1	2	0	—		—		28	1
Korabi Peshkopi	Total		51	8	2	0	—		—		53	8
Kastrioti Krujë	2017–18	Albanian First Division	25	2	1	0	—		—		26	2
Kastrioti Krujë	2018–19	Albanian Superliga	1	1	0	0	—		—		1	1
Kastrioti Krujë	Total		26	3	1	0	—		—		27	3
Career total			163	21	9	0	2	0	1	0	174	21
