= 2013–14 Kategoria e Parë =

Kategoria e Parë
- Season: 2013–14
- Champions: Elbasani
- Promoted: Elbasani; Apolonia
- Relegated: Albpetrol; Himara
- Matches: 240
- Goals: 555 (2.31 per match)
- Top goalscorer: Mustafa Agastra (21)
- Biggest home win: Adriatiku 7-3 Tomori (16 February 2014); Butrinti 4-0 Tomori (30 April 2014)
- Biggest away win: Kamza 1-6 Himara (2 November 2013)
- Highest scoring: Kamza 6-5 Tërbuni (10 May 2014)
- Highest attendance: 5,000; Elbasani 1-4 Apolonia (7 December 2013)

The 2013–14 Kategoria e Parë was competed between 16 teams started on 31 August 2013 and finished on 10 May 2014.

== Changes from last season ==
=== Team changes ===
==== From Kategoria e Parë ====
Promoted to Kategoria Superiore:

- Lushnja
- Partizani

Relegated to Kategoria e Dytë:

- Besëlidhja
- Iliria
- Gramshi
- Naftëtari

==== To Kategoria e Parë ====
Relegated from Kategoria Superiore:

- Shkumbini
- Tomori
- Luftëtari
- Apolonia

Promoted from Kategoria e Dytë:

- Veleçiku
- Albpetrol

== League table ==
Pos	Team	Pld	W	D	L	GF	GA	GD	Pts	Promotion or relegation
1	Elbasani (C, P)	30	18	6	6	46	32	+14	60	Promotion to 2014–15 Kategoria Superiore
2	Apolonia (P)	30	14	14	2	37	14	+23	56	Promotion to 2014–15 Kategoria Superiore
3	Tërbuni	30	14	7	9	47	31	+16	49	
4	Butrinti	30	13	5	12	38	27	+11	44	
5	Tomori	30	13	5	12	29	36	−7	44	
6	Pogradeci	30	11	9	10	33	31	+2	42	
7	Shkumbini	30	11	7	12	34	37	−3	40	
8	Burreli	30	10	9	11	25	29	−4	39	
9	Dinamo Tirana	30	9	12	9	33	31	+2	39	
10	Luftëtari	30	10	8	12	33	37	−4	38	
11	Veleçiku	30	11	4	15	33	40	−7	37	
12	Ada	30	11	4	15	29	43	−14	37	
13	Kamza	30	11	4	15	33	47	−14	37	
14	Adriatiku (Note: Adriatiku were deducted six points.)	30	12	6	12	41	41	0	36	
15	Himara (R)	30	10	6	14	34	34	0	36	Relegation to 2014–15 Kategoria e Dytë
16	Albpetrol (R)	30	6	6	18	21	36	−15	24	Relegation to 2014–15 Kategoria e Dytë

Source: Soccerway
Rules for classification: 1) points; 2) goal difference; 3) number of goals scored; 4) head-to-head points; 5) head-to-head goal difference; 6) draw. (Head-to-head record is applied for clubs with the same number of points only once all matches between said clubs have been played.)
(C) Champions; (P) Promoted; (R) Relegated

== Top scorers ==
Rank	Player	Club	Goals
1	Mustafa Agastra	Tërbuni	21
2	Albion Blloku	Kamza	17
2	Jasmin Raboshta	Butrinti	17
4	Endri Dalipi	Elbasani	16
5	Klejdis Branica	Shkumbini	10

== Foreign players ==
Nationality	Player	Team	Appearances	Goals
Canada	Arlind Ferhati	Dinamo Tirana	15	0
Montenegro	Simo Goranović	Ada Velipojë	10	2
Montenegro	Vuk Kovačević	Ada Velipojë	9	1
Serbia	Vilson Caković	Apolonia Fier	7	0
Nigeria	Sodiq Atanda	Apolonia Fier	27	3
Nigeria	Sulaimon Adekunle	Apolonia Fier	26	3
Nigeria	Morrise Anayo	Apolonia Fier	23	4
(North Macedonia) Macedonia	Nikola Tripunovski	Apolonia Fier	7	0
(North Macedonia) Macedonia	Perica Vasilevski	Apolonia Fier	13	2
Nigeria	Gabriel Steven	KS Burreli	23	2
(North Macedonia) Macedonia	Nedzat Drazanin	Butrinti Sarandë	4	0
Kosovo	Albert Kaçiku	Dinamo Tirana	7	0
Croatia	Matko Djarmati	Dinamo Tirana	26	6
Brazil	Mauricio	Tërbuni/Elbasani	20	1
Kosovo	Rinor Humolli	KS Kamza	8	0
Kosovo	Arbnor Sefiu	KS Kamza	1	0
Nigeria	Joseph Olatunji	KS Kamza	3	0
Serbia	Aleksandar Stojković	Luftëtari Gjirokastër	3	0
Kosovo	Bekim Salihu	Adriatiku Mamurrasi	1	0
Argentina	Federico Mazur	Shkumbini Peqin	8	0
Argentina	Diego Rovira	Shkumbini Peqin	12	0
Kosovo	Ruhan Foniqi	Tomori Berat	11	0
Serbia	Miloš Jevđević	KF Tërbuni Pukë	7	0
Brazil	De Lacerda	KF Tërbuni Pukë	22	3
Argentina	Bruno Fistori	KF Tërbuni Pukë	4	1
Paraguay	Wilfrido Gaona	KF Tërbuni Pukë	5	0
