= Lejdi Liçaj =

Albanian footballer

Personal information
- Date of birth: 19 January 1987 (age 39)
- Place of birth: Vlorë, Albania
- Height: 1.80 m (5 ft 11 in)
- Position: Midfielder

Youth career
- 2003–2007: Apolonia Fier

Senior career*
Years	Team	Apps	(Gls)
2007–2008	Apolonia		
2008–2012	Flamurtari	31	(2)
2009	→ Skënderbeu (loan)	15	(0)
2012–2013	Luftëtari	11	(3)
2013–2014	Flamurtari	33	(3)
2015	Bylis	15	(4)
2015–2017	Luftëtari	56	(4)
2017–2018	Flamurtari	9	(1)
2018	Luftëtari	29	(3)
2019	Flamurtari	4	(0)
2021–2023	Flamurtari	17	(1)
- * Club domestic league appearances and goals

Lejdi Liçaj (born 19 January 1987) is an Albanian former professional footballer who played as a midfielder.

== Club career ==
=== Flamurtari Vlorë ===
On 18 July 2017, Liçaj agreed personal terms and joined Flamurtari Vlorë for a third time. The transfer was made official, with the player signing a deal for the upcoming season. He scored his first goal of the season on 19 November in his fifth league appearance against Lushnja; his 91st minute overhead kick was the lone goal of the match.

On 19 January 2018, Liçaj left the club after celebrating his 31st birthday with his teammates. His third spell at his boyhood club ended with 13 appearances between league and cup, scoring three times.

=== Luftëtari Gjirokastër ===
On 19 January 2018, Luftëtari Gjirokastër announced to have signed Liçaj, thus returning him for a third spell at Bluzinjtë. He made his third debut for the club one week later by coming on in 7th minute for the injured Oltion Rapa in an eventual 2–0 home win against Skënderbeu Korçë. He scored his first goal of his third spell later on 14 March in the match against Kukësi, a header which put Luftëtari ahead as the match ended 2–1. The goal prompted Luftëtari fans to nickname him "Chinese Roberto Carlos".

=== Back to Flamurtari Vlorë ===
On 5 January 2019, Liçaj returned to Flamurtari Vlorë.

== Honours ==
Flamurtari Vlorë

- Albanian Cup: 2008–09, 2013–14

Luftëtari Gjirokastër

- Albanian First Division: 2015–16
