= Stefan Cicmil =

Montenegrin footballer (born 1990)

Personal information
- Date of birth: 16 August 1990 (age 36)
- Place of birth: Titograd, SFR Yugoslavia
- Height: 1.90 m (6 ft 3 in)
- Position: Centre-back

Youth career
- 2008–2009: Budućnost Podgorica

Senior career*
Years	Team	Apps	(Gls)
2009–2012	Budućnost Podgorica	47	(5)
2009–2010	→ Kom (loan)	15	(1)
2013	Radnički Niš	7	(0)
2013–2014	Spartak Subotica	11	(1)
2014	Mladost Lučani	6	(0)
2015	Mladost Velika Obarska	13	(1)
2015–2017	Vllaznia Shkodër	57	(6)
2017–2018	Mladost Podgorica	31	(2)
2018–2021	Sutjeska	33	(3)
2021–2022	Podgorica	17	(0)

International career
2008–2009	Montenegro U19	4	(0)
- * Club domestic league appearances and goals

Stefan Cicmil (Cyrillic: Стефан Цицмил, born 16 August 1990) is a Montenegrin former professional footballer.

== Club career ==
Born in Titograd, Cicmil played in the youth team of Budućnost Podgorica. He made his debut as a senior while playing on loan with Kom in the 2009–10 season. He later played the following three seasons in the Montenegrin First League back with Budućnost Podgorica. During the winter break of the 2012–13 season, he moved abroad by joining Serbian SuperLiga side Radnički Niš. In summer 2013 he moved to another Serbian SuperLiga club, FK Spartak Subotica.

=== Vllaznia Shkodër ===
On 5 July 2015, Cicmil completed a transfer to Albanian Superliga side Vllaznia Shkodër as a free agent. He was presented on the same day along with his patriots Andrija Dragojević and Darko Pavićević, with them all signing a one-year contract. Cicmil made his competitive debut with the team in the opening league match of the season against reigning champions Skënderbeu Korçë, playing the entire match of an eventual 0–1 defeat. He scored his first Vllaznia goal in the All-time Albanian derby against Tirana, a header in the 11th minute after an owngoal six minutes earlier, to lead the team into a 3–1 home, the first after eight matches. Later on 25 April, Cicmil scored again, the opening goal against fellow relegation strugglers Flamurtari Vlorë, as Vllaznia took another 3 points to keep them alive. Cicmil established himself in the starting lineup, with Vllaznia securing the stay in the league in the matchday 34, thanks to a 2–0 home win over Tërbuni Pukë. He finished the season with 36 appearances, including 34 in league, scoring three times in the process.

On 22 June 2016, Cicmil agreed a contract extension with the club, signing until June 2017. He kept his spot in the lineup for the 2016–17 season, making his first appearance on 8 September in a goalless home draw against Kukësi. He scored his first strike of the season on 25 November, the winner against Flamurtari, which was the first after three matches. It was Vllaznia's first win in Vlorë after 9 years. Later on 14 December, Cicmil received a straight red card for a hard challenge on Laçi's Bruno Aquino, with Vllazia suffering the second consecutive league defeat. On 27 January of the following year, during the 0–1 home defeat to Kukësi, Cicmil suffered an injury and was sent out with stretcher. After the match, it was confirmed that Cicmil had suffered "ligament disengagement" on the left leg, and the recovery time would take around 1 month. He made his return on 19 March against Teuta Durrës, entering on the field in the last seconds of the match which ended in a goalless draw. On 6 May, in the important match against Skënderbeu Korçë for team's European goal, Cicmil made perhaps his worst performance of his career, conceding a penalty at the end of the first half, which saw him booked, and conceding another one in the 95th minute, which forced him to leave the match, as Vllaznia lost 4–3 in Korçë. In the interview after the match, coach Armando Cungu publicly criticized Cicmil, citing: "It's not the first time that he makes such mistakes, and i've taken the decision to not play him and goalkeeper (Selimaj) anymore." He also added that Cicmil was not going to be part of Vllaznia for the next season.

== International career ==
Stefan Cicmil has been a member of the Montenegro national under-19 football team.

== Honours ==
Budućnost Podgorica

- Montenegrin First League: 2011–12
