= Orjand Beqiri =

Albanian footballer

Personal information
- Full name: Orjand Beqiri
- Date of birth: 21 February 1985 (age 41)
- Place of birth: Vlorë, Albania
- Height: 1.92 m (6 ft 4 in)
- Position: Centre back

Team information
- Current team: Besa Kavajë
- Number: 5

Youth career
- 2000–2007: Flamurtari Vlorë

Senior career*
Years	Team	Apps	(Gls)
2007–2012	Flamurtari	67	(1)
2012–2013	Luftëtari	22	(1)
2013–2014	Flamurtari	12	(1)
2014–2015	Mamurrasi	15	(1)
2015–2018	Luftëtari	45	(1)
2018–2019	Kamza	10	(0)
2019–	Besa Kavajë	8	(0)
- * Club domestic league appearances and goals as of 13:12, 7 February 2020 (UTC)

Orjand Beqiri (born 21 February 1985) is an Albanian football player who plays for KS Besa Kavajë in the Albanian First Division as a centre back.

== Club career ==
=== Luftëtari Gjirokastër ===
In July 2015, Beqiri completed a transfer to Luftëtari Gjirokastër, returning for the first time in two years.

In the 2017–18 season, he played 32 league matches as the team finished third, meaning that Luftëtari have gained the right to play in European competitions for the first time in history.

On 4 June 2018, he confirmed his departure from the club after three seasons, stating: My adventure at Gjirokastër came to an end."

=== Kamza ===
On 9 July 2018, Beqiri begun training with fellow top flight side Kamza. He got his exit permit from Luftëtari only on 14 August as his transfer to Kamza become official. Beqiri was allocated squad number 20 and made his debut by playing full-90 minutes in Kamza's opening league match, a 1–0 surprise win over Tirana.

== Honours ==
Flamurtari Vlorë

- Albanian First Division: 2008–09, 2013–14

Luftëtari Gjirokastër

- Albanian First Division: 2015–16
