= Mauricio Martins =

Brazilian footballer

Personal information
- Full name: Mauricio Igor Rodrigues Martins
- Date of birth: 8 February 1993 (age 33)
- Place of birth: Buritis, Brazil
- Height: 1.84 m (6 ft 0 in)
- Position: Left-back

Senior career*
Years	Team	Apps	(Gls)
2012–2013	São Carlos	1	(0)
2013	Tërbuni Pukë	11	(0)
2014	Elbasani	16	(1)
2015–2016	ŁKS Łódź	38	(7)
2016–2018	Águeda	40	(5)
2018	Sintrense	0	(0)
2018–2019	Alcains	15	(2)
2019	AD Oliveirense	15	(2)
2019–2020	Felgueiras 1932	7	(0)
2020–2021	Oliveira do Bairro	2	
Total		145	(17)
- * Club domestic league appearances and goals

Mauricio Igor Rodrigues Martins (born 8 February 1993), commonly known as Mauricio is a Brazilian former professional footballer who played as a left-back.

== Career ==
In January 2014 he went on trial with Wisła Kraków, before moving to KF Elbasani.

== Honours ==
KF Elbasani

- Albanian First Division: 2013–14
