= Sodiq Atanda =

Nigerian footballer (born 1993)

Personal information
- Full name: Sodiq Ololade Atanda
- Date of birth: 26 August 1993 (age 33)
- Place of birth: Kano, Nigeria
- Height: 1.82 m (6 ft 0 in)
- Position: Centre back

Team information
- Current team: Erzeni
- Number: 36

Youth career
- 2010–2011: 36 Lions

Senior career*
Years	Team	Apps	(Gls)
2011–2012	36 Lions	11	(0)
2013–2015	Apolonia	76	(3)
2015–2019	Partizani	91	(1)
2019–2021	Hapoel Kfar Saba	56	(0)
2021–2022	Prishtina	13	(0)
2022	Dhofar Club	0	(0)
2022–2023	Egnatia	35	(1)
2023–	Erzeni	29	(0)

International career
2014–2015	Nigeria U23	5	(0)
- * Club domestic league appearances and goals as of 1 June 2024

Sodiq Atanda (born 26 August 1993) is a Nigerian professional footballer who plays as a centre back for Albanian club Erzeni. Having Albanian nationality to stay for many years

== Club career ==
=== Partizani ===
On 24 December 2015, Atanda joined Kategoria Superiore side Partizani on a free transfer following the expire of his Apolonia contract. He made his league debut with the club on 30 January of the following year, playing ful-90 minutes in a 2–0 home success over Laçi.

In April 2016, Atanda produced strong performances by helping Partizani keep three clean-sheets in 4 matches, conceding only once, which helped him earn Albanian Superliga Player of the Month.

On 27 October 2017, he agreed a contract extension, signing until June 2019.

=== Hapoel Kfar Saba ===
On 25 June 2019, Atanda signed to Hapoel Kfar Saba.

== International career ==
Atanda has made 5 appearances with Nigeria U23 squad.

== Personal life ==
He has an additional Albanian passport.

== Career statistics ==
As of 17 December 2017

Club statistics
Club	Season	League			Cup		Europe		Total	
Club	Season	Division	Apps	Goals	Apps	Goals	Apps	Goals	Apps	Goals
Apolonia	2012–13	Kategoria Superiore	12	0	0	0	—		12	0
Apolonia	2013–14	Kategoria e Parë	27	3	2	0	—		29	3
Apolonia	2014–15	Kategoria Superiore	26	0	2	0	—		28	0
Apolonia	2015–16	Kategoria e Parë	11	0	1	0	—		12	0
Apolonia	Total		76	3	5	0	—		81	3
Partizani	2015–16	Kategoria Superiore	16	0	1	0	—		17	0
Partizani	2016–17	Kategoria Superiore	28	1	3	0	5 (Note: Tree appearances in UEFA Champions League, two in UEFA Europa League)	0	36	1
Partizani	2017–18	Kategoria Superiore	12	0	2	0	2 (Note: All appearance(s) in UEFA Europa League)	0	16	0
Partizani	Total		56	1	6	0	7	0	69	1
Career total			132	4	11	0	7	0	150	4

== Honours ==
- Albanian Superliga Player of the Month: April 2016
