= Dejvi Bregu =

Albanian footballer (born 1995)

Personal information
- Date of birth: 24 October 1995 (age 31)
- Place of birth: Vlorë, Albania
- Height: 1.70 m (5 ft 7 in)
- Position: Winger

Team information
- Current team: Al-Zulfi
- Number: 11

Youth career
- 2011–2013: Flamurtari

Senior career*
Years	Team	Apps	(Gls)
2012–2016	Flamurtari	26	(10)
2016–2018	Luftëtari	80	(30)
2018–2020	Skënderbeu	61	(20)
2020–2021	Teuta	36	(16)
2021–2023	Boluspor	63	(10)
2023–2024	Umraniyespor	11	(1)
2024	Wisła Kraków	12	(1)
2024–2026	Dinamo City	58	(21)
2026–	Al-Zulfi	8	(2)

International career
2015	Albania U21	1	(0)
- * Club domestic league appearances and goals as of 21 October 2026

Dejvi Bregu (born 24 October 1995) is an Albanian professional footballer who plays as a winger for Saudi First Division club Al-Zulfi.

== Club career ==
=== Flamurtari ===
Bregu was first promoted to Flamurtari's senior squad on 12 May 2012 for the final matchday against Laçi. He was able to make his professional debut when manager Shkëlqim Muça decided to put him in place of Semiran Çela as the match ended in a goalless draw.

In the 2012–13 season, Bregu made two league appearances, both of them as starter, in the final two matchdays against Vllaznia (3–1 win) and Apolonia (0–0 draw).

Bregu scored his first senior goals during the 2013–14 season in 2013–14 Albanian Cup; the goals came on 18 December 2013 in the 4–2 home win over Tomori in the second leg of second round.

Bregu had his breakthrough season during the second part of 2014–15 season where his goals made him a vital member of the Flamurtari side which was having a failed season. He scored his first goal in the Kategoria Superiore on 4 April 2015 against Tirana, netting in the 47th minute just one minute after coming on in place of Jurgen Sino to temporally level the figures in an eventual 2–1 home defeat. The goal was followed by another one in the next week, this time against Apolonia, in another 2–1 loss. He concluded the 2014–15 season by scoring 5 goals in 14 league appearances and in addition 3 goals in 3 cup matches.

Bregu was mostly benched in the first half of 2015–16 season, collecting 327 minutes from only 8 matches, 4 of them as starter. He eventually left the club during the winter transfer window, finishing his spell at the club with 36 appearances and 12 goals between league and cup.

=== Luftëtari ===
On 30 January 2016, Bregu joined Kategoria e Parë side Luftëtari on a free transfer. He signed a contract until December 2016.

==== 2015–16 season: Promotion to top flight ====
Bregu was allocated squad number 21, and made his competitive debut on 13 February in the league match at Lushnja, entering as a second-half substitute and scoring a last-minute winner via a free-kick. Bregu played his first match as a starter on 6 April in his 7th league appearance by scoring the lone goal against Turbina, a match which was infamously marred after a brawl between players. Four days later, he scored his first brace in Luftëtari's 5–1 defeat of Butrinti, taking his tally up to four league goals. Bregu finished the second part of 2015–16 season by scoring 7 times in 15 league appearances, as Luftëtari achieved promotion to Kategoria Superiore for 2016–17 season, returning in top flight after three years.

==== 2016–17 season: Talent of the Year ====
Bregu announced that he was going to play for Luftëtari in the upcoming season by agreeing a contract extension, penning until June 2018. He played his first match of 2016–17 on 7 September against Partizani at Elbasan Arena, unable to avoid the 1–0 away loss. On 5 October, in the returning leg of 2016–17 Albanian Cup first round against Elbasani, Bregu scored a last-minute equalizer to help Luftëtari go through 3–2 on aggregate. He opened his scoring account in league in matchday 8 by scoring the winner home against Tirana to give the team the third win of the season.

During the winter transfer window, Bregu was linked with many Kategoria Superiore sides, including Skënderbeu, Partizani Tirana and Kukësi, but the club denied all the rumours by stating that the player has a contract with the club.

In the second part of season Bregu continued to be an important player in the impressive Luftëtari side. His goal in the match against Tirana on 19 March 2017 resulted the winner as Luftëtari took all three points. Later on the final matchday of championship, he scored the winner via a penalty kick against Kukësi the cause the latter the first league loss of 2016–17 season. Following the end of the season, Bregu was named Kategoria Superiore Talent of the Season by association "Sporti na bashkon". He bagged 9 in 32 matches as Luftëtari finished in an impressive 4th place, but missed out Europe after Tirana won Albanian Cup.

==== 2017–18 season: Reaching Europa League ====
Bregu started his third Luftëtari season by playing full-90 minutes in the opening day of 2017–18 Kategoria Superiore versus Teuta. His first score-sheet contributions of the 2017–18 campaign came on 12 October in form of a temporary equalizer against Kamza in an eventual 1–2 loss. Later on 17 December, Bregu scored the opener in the 5–0 thrashing of Partizani at Gjirokastra Stadium to bring his tally up to 5 goals. It was Partizani's biggest loss since returning in top flight in 2013.

In the 2017–18 season, he played 33 league matches and scored 9 goals as the team finished third, meaning that Luftëtari have gained the right to play in European competitions for the first time in history.

==== The short-term loan ====
In June 2018, following Skënderbeu exclusion from European competitions by UEFA for the next 10 years, the club loaned Bregu at Luftëtari for the 2018–19 UEFA Europa League first qualifying round against Latvia's Ventspils. He started in the first leg played at Ventspils Olimpiskais Stadions on 12 July, but it was a game to forget as the team lost 5–0 with all goals conceded in the first half. Then Bregu was left in bench for the second leg after having a confrontation with manager Miloš Kostić who was reportedly unhappy with his commitment in training. Bregu remained an unused substitute as Luftëtari drew 3–3 at Elbasan Arena which confirmed their elimination. After the end of the match, which was dubbed as fixed by Albanian media, Kostić told the media that Bregu did not play due to a "tactical decision" while Bregu himself stated that he was "relieved" not to play.

=== Skënderbeu ===
In January 2018, Bregu reached an agreement with fellow Kategoria Superiore side Skënderbeu. In the meantime, he remained at Luftëtari but as a loanee until the end of the season.

Bregu was officially presented as a Skënderbeu player on 24 July where he signed a contract running until 2021. He made his official debut for the club on 12 August in the 2018 Albanian Supercup match against Laçi, making an excellent performance by first winning a penalty kick which was successfully scored by Gjergji Muzaka for a one-goal lead and then scoring for himself to make it 3–1 in an eventual 3–2 win at Selman Stërmasi Stadium. It has Skënderbeu's third trophy in 2018 and Bregu's third in his professional career. Five days later, Bregu made his league debut as well in the opening day against Partizani Tirana, proving to be instrumental once again as he won a penalty in injury time which was scored again by Gjergji Muzaka for a 1–0 win. Bregu scored his first league goals in the second matchday versus newly promoted side Kastrioti Krujë, netting in each half, including a free-kick, to lead his side to a 3–0 victory.

On 9 January 2019, Bregu was injured during the 2–1 friendly win over Tirana after a collision with defender Marvin Turtulli. Following the examinations, it was confirmed that Bregu has suffered a fracture in his left hand and the surgery was needed. He was operated in the capital the following day and the recovery time was expected to be at least one month.

=== Teuta Durrës ===
After his contract expired with Skënderbeu, on 28 September 2020, Bregu signed a one-year contract with Teuta Durrës. He helped them win the Albanian Superliga title, for the second time in their history. He won the Golden Boot in the process, scoring 16 goals.

=== Boluspor ===
On 12 July 2021, after his contract with Teuta expired, Bregu signed with Turkish club Boluspor.

=== Wisła Kraków ===
After leaving Boluspor in mid-2023 and a short stint with Umraniyespor, Bregu signed a six-month contract with Polish second-tier club Wisła Kraków on 26 January 2024. Wisła would go on to win the 2023–24 Polish Cup, with Bregu making appearances in a quarter-final win over Widzew Łódź and a semi-final victory over Piast Gliwice. On 29 May that year, it was announced he would leave the club at the end of his contract.

=== Dinamo City ===
On 7 August 2024, Bregu returned to Albania signing a 3-year contract with Dinamo City. He scored 12 goals in the 2024–25 season as Dinamo won the Albanian Cup and finished fourth in the league. On 28 December 2025, he scored one of the goals of his team as Dinamo won the 2025 Albanian Supercup defeating Egnatia 3–1 in the Air Albania Stadium.

== International career ==
Bregu was called up to the Albania national under-19 football team to participate in the 2013 UEFA European Under-19 Championship qualification, coached by Foto Strakosha. However he was not selected in the final 18-man squad that participated in the tournament.

Following some impressive performances in the Kategoria Superiore with Flamurtari, he received his first international call up by Albania under-21s head coach Skënder Gega in the squad from home league Kategoria Superiore to participate in for a 3-days mini preparatory stage in Durrës, Albania from 22 to 25 February 2015.

== Career statistics ==
As of match played 28 August 2025

Appearances and goals by club, season and competition
Club	Season	League			National cup (Note: Includes Albanian Cup, Turkish Cup, Polish Cup)		Europe		Other		Total	
Club	Season	Division	Apps	Goals	Apps	Goals	Apps	Goals	Apps	Goals	Apps	Goals
Flamurtari	2011–12	Kategoria Superiore	1	0	—		—		—		1	0
Flamurtari	2012–13	Kategoria Superiore	2	0	—		0	0	—		2	0
Flamurtari	2013–14	Kategoria Superiore	1	0	3	2	—		—		4	2
Flamurtari	2014–15	Kategoria Superiore	14	5	3	3	—		—		17	8
Flamurtari	2015–16	Kategoria Superiore	8	0	4	2	—		—		12	2
Flamurtari	Total		26	5	10	7	0	0	—		36	12
Luftëtari	2015–16	Kategoria e Parë	15	7	—		—		—		15	7
Luftëtari	2016–17	Kategoria Superiore	32	9	2	1	—		—		34	10
Luftëtari	2017–18	Kategoria Superiore	33	9	2	0	—		—		35	9
Luftëtari	2018–19	Kategoria Superiore	—		—		1 (Note: Appearance in UEFA Europa League)	0	—		1	0
Luftëtari	Total		80	25	4	1	1	0	—		85	26
Skënderbeu	2018–19	Kategoria Superiore	27	8	2	2	—		1 (Note: Appearance in Albanian Supercup)	1	30	11
Skënderbeu	2019–20	Kategoria Superiore	34	10	3	0	—		—		37	10
Skënderbeu	Total		61	18	5	2	—		1	1	67	21
Teuta	2020–21	Kategoria Superiore	36	16	3	1	—		—		39	17
Teuta	2021–22	Kategoria Superiore	—		—		1 (Note: Appearance in UEFA Champions League)	0	—		1	0
Teuta	Total		36	16	3	1	1	0	—		40	17
Boluspor	2021–22	Turkish First League	32	5	1	0	—		—		33	5
Boluspor	2022–23	Turkish First League	31	5	3	2	—		—		34	7
Boluspor	Total		63	10	4	2	—		—		67	12
Umraniyespor	2023–24	Turkish First League	11	1	1	0	—		—		12	1
Wisła Kraków	2023–24	I liga	12	1	2	0	—		—		14	1
Dinamo City	2024–25	Kategoria Superiore	23	10	4	1	—		2 (Note: Appearances in Kategoria Superiore final four round)	1	29	12
Dinamo City	2025–26	Kategoria Superiore	0	0	0	0	6 (Note: Appearances in UEFA Conference League)	2	0	0	6	2
Dinamo City	Total		23	10	4	1	6	2	2	2	35	14
Career total			312	86	33	20	4	0	3	2	356	104

== Honours ==
Flamurtari

- Albanian Cup: 2013–14

Luftëtari

- Kategoria e Parë: 2015–16

Skënderbeu

- Albanian Supercup: 2018

Teuta

- Kategoria Superiore: 2020–21

Wisła Kraków

- Polish Cup: 2023–24

Dinamo City

- Albanian Cup: 2024–25, 2025–26
- Albanian Supercup: 2025

Individual

- Kategoria Superiore Talent of the Season: 2016–17
- Albanian Superliga Golden Boot: 2020–21
