= 2015–16 Kategoria e Parë =

Kategoria e Parë
- Season: 2015–16
- Champions: Luftëtari
- Promoted: Luftëtari; Korabi
- Relegated: Ada; Butrinti
- Top goalscorer: Mikel Canka (20)
- Biggest home win: Luftëtari 5–0 Elbasani (31 October 2015); Iliria 6–1 Ada (28 November 2015)
- Biggest away win: Kamza 0–4 Besëlidhja (24 October 2015)
- Highest scoring: Iliria 6–1 Ada (28 November 2015)

The 2015–16 Kategoria e Parë was competed between 20 teams in 2 groups, A and B, respectively.

== Stadia by capacity and locations ==
=== Group A ===
| Team | Location | Stadium | Capacity |
|---|---|---|---|
| Ada | Velipojë | Fusha Sportive Adriatik | 1,000 |
| Besa | Kavajë | Besa Stadium | 8,000 |
| Besëlidhja | Lezhë | Brian Filipi Stadium | 5,000 |
| Burreli | Burrel | Liri Ballabani Stadium | 2,500 |
| Iliria | Fushë-Krujë | Redi Maloku Stadium | 3,000 |
| Kamza | Kamëz | Kamëz Stadium | 5,500 |
| Kastrioti | Krujë | Kastrioti Stadium | 10,000 |
| Adriatiku | Mamurras | Mamurras Stadium | 1,000 |
| Veleçiku | Koplik | Kompleksi Vellezërit Duli | 2,000 |

=== Group B ===
| Team | Location | Stadium | Capacity |
|---|---|---|---|
| Butrinti | Sarandë | Butrinti Stadium | 5,500 |
| Dinamo Tirana | Tirana | Selman Stërmasi Stadium | 12,500 |
| Luftëtari | Gjirokastër | Gjirokastër Stadium | 8,400 |
| Lushnja | Lushnjë | Abdurrahman Roza Haxhiu Stadium | 8,500 |
| Naftëtari | Kuçovë | Bashkim Sulejmani Stadium | 5,000 |
| Pogradeci | Pogradec | Gjorgji Kyçyku Stadium | 8,000 |
| Shkumbini | Peqin | Shkumbini Stadium | 5,000 |
| Sopoti | Librazhd | Sopoti Stadium | 3,000 |
| Tomori | Berat | Tomori Stadium | 14,500 |

== League tables ==
=== Group A ===
| Pos | Team | Pld | W | D | L | GF | GA | GD | Pts | Promotion or relegation |
|---|---|---|---|---|---|---|---|---|---|---|
| 1 | Korabi (P) | 27 | 20 | 2 | 5 | 43 | 16 | +27 | 62 | Promotion to 2016–17 Kategoria Superiore |
| 2 | Kastrioti | 27 | 19 | 6 | 2 | 61 | 27 | +34 | 60 (Note: Kastrioti were deducted three points.) | |
| 3 | Besëlidhja | 27 | 16 | 6 | 5 | 59 | 26 | +33 | 54 | |
| 4 | Erzeni | 27 | 10 | 4 | 13 | 47 | 45 | +2 | 34 | |
| 5 | Burreli | 27 | 10 | 4 | 13 | 29 | 38 | −9 | 34 | |
| 6 | Kamza | 27 | 8 | 6 | 13 | 33 | 44 | −11 | 30 | |
| 7 | Besa | 27 | 8 | 5 | 14 | 31 | 40 | −9 | 29 | |
| 8 | Iliria | 27 | 8 | 4 | 15 | 34 | 45 | −11 | 28 | |
| 9 | Adriatiku | 27 | 6 | 7 | 14 | 22 | 42 | −20 | 25 | Play-out relegation to 2016–17 Kategoria e Dytë |
| 10 | Ada (R) | 27 | 5 | 6 | 16 | 29 | 65 | −36 | 21 | Relegation to 2016–17 Kategoria e Dytë |

Source: Soccerway
Rules for classification: 1) points; 2) goal difference; 3) number of goals scored; 4) head-to-head points; 5) head-to-head goal difference; 6) draw. (Head-to-head record is applied for clubs with the same number of points only once all matches between said clubs have been played.)
(P) Promoted; (R) Relegated

=== Group B ===
| Pos | Team | Pld | W | D | L | GF | GA | GD | Pts | Promotion or relegation |
|---|---|---|---|---|---|---|---|---|---|---|
| 1 | Luftëtari (C, P) | 27 | 21 | 5 | 1 | 53 | 9 | +44 | 68 | Promotion to 2016–17 Kategoria Superiore |
| 2 | Pogradeci | 27 | 20 | 3 | 4 | 51 | 24 | +27 | 63 | |
| 3 | Apolonia | 27 | 14 | 4 | 9 | 42 | 26 | +16 | 46 | |
| 4 | Lushnja | 27 | 9 | 4 | 14 | 26 | 35 | −9 | 31 | |
| 5 | Dinamo Tirana | 27 | 10 | 3 | 14 | 27 | 32 | −5 | 30 (Note: Dinamo Tirana were deducted three points.) | |
| 6 | Elbasani | 27 | 8 | 5 | 14 | 27 | 45 | −18 | 29 | |
| 7 | Shkumbini | 27 | 8 | 5 | 14 | 19 | 40 | −21 | 29 | |
| 8 | Sopoti | 27 | 8 | 4 | 15 | 30 | 33 | −3 | 28 | |
| 9 | Turbina | 27 | 8 | 7 | 12 | 29 | 37 | −8 | 28 (Note: Turbina were deducted three points.) | Play-out relegation to 2016–17 Kategoria e Dytë |
| 10 | Butrinti (R) | 27 | 6 | 6 | 15 | 15 | 38 | −23 | 24 | Relegation to 2016–17 Kategoria e Dytë |

Source: Soccerway
Rules for classification: 1) points; 2) goal difference; 3) number of goals scored; 4) head-to-head points; 5) head-to-head goal difference; 6) draw. (Head-to-head record is applied for clubs with the same number of points only once all matches between said clubs have been played.)
(C) Champions; (P) Promoted; (R) Relegated

== Final ==
19 May 2016
16:30 CEST

| Korabi | 0–0 | Luftëtari |
|---|---|---|
| | Report |
Penalties
| Mziu (penalty scored); Muçollari (penalty scored); Shazivari (penalty scored); Hoxha (penalty scored); Kotorri (penalty scored); Jubani (penalty scored); Frashëri (penalty missed); Bishaj (penalty scored); Gjoka (penalty scored); Pelinku (penalty scored); Guri (penalty scored); Mziu (penalty missed) | 10–11 | (penalty scored) Ramadani; (penalty scored) Rroca; (penalty scored) Mersini; (penalty scored) Arifaj; (penalty scored) Dhrami; (penalty scored) Beqiri; (penalty missed) Rapo; (penalty scored) Aleksi; (penalty scored) Liçaj; (penalty scored) Rapa; (penalty scored) Miraka; (penalty scored) Ramadani |

Qemal Stafa Stadium, Tirana
Referee: Sokol Çekaj

== Foreign players ==
| Nationality | Player | Team |
|---|---|---|
| Brazil | Jacques Aguiar | Kamza |
| Brazil | Cate Fonseca | Kamza |
| Brazil | Pericles | Pogradeci |
| Brazil | Pedro Mendes Misteri | Sopoti |
| Cameroon | Joseph Asong | Elbasani |
| Canada | Arlind Ferhati | Kastrioti |
| Croatia | Matko Djarmati | Kastrioti |
| Equatorial Guinea | Kelvin Onosiughe | Turbina |
| Kosovo | Albert Kaçiku | Apolonia |
| Kosovo | David Domgjoni | Kastrioti |
| (North Macedonia) Macedonia | Ertan Hasan | Besëlidhja |
| Nigeria | Sulaimon Adekunle | Butrinti |
| Nigeria | Gabriel Steven | Turbina |
| Nigeria | Abraham Alechenwu | Kamza |
| Nigeria | Sodiq Atanda | Apolonia |
| Senegal | Lancinet Sidibe | Besëlidhja |
| Senegal | Sekou Camara | Besëlidhja |
| Serbia | Dejan Lazarević | Apolonia |
| Serbia | Marko Rajković | Apolonia |
| Serbia | Milan Đorđević | Besëlidhja |
| Serbia | Nebojša Vukmirović | Besëlidhja |
| Serbia | Kosta Bajić | Besëlidhja |
| South Korea | Nak-Hyeon Choi | Ada |
| South Korea | Yong-jin Lee | Ada |
| South Korea | Sung-Ho Lim | Ada |
| South Korea | Jeong-Ho Kim | Ada |
| United States | Austin Rogers | Besa |
