= Silvio Zogaj =

Albanian footballer

Personal information
- Date of birth: 25 July 1997 (age 29)
- Place of birth: Lezhë, Albania
- Height: 1.80 m (5 ft 11 in)
- Position: Midfielder

Team information
- Current team: Erzeni
- Number: 77

Youth career
- 2011–2012: Besëlidhja Lezhë
- 2012–2013: Adriatiku
- 2013–2015: Vllaznia Shkodër
- 2014–2015: → Brian's AF (loan)

Senior career*
Years	Team	Apps	(Gls)
2016	Vllaznia B	3	(0)
2016–2017	Luftëtari	16	(0)
2018	Laçi	6	(0)
2018–2020	Vllaznia Shkodër	50	(5)
2020–2022	Teuta	14	(0)
2022–2023	Kastrioti	49	(2)
2023	Flamurtari	14	(2)
2024	Erzeni	6	(0)
2024–	Liria Prizren		
- * Club domestic league appearances and goals as of 1 June 2024 ‡ National team caps and goals as of 29 May 2025

Silvio Zogaj (born 25 July 1997) is an Albanian professional footballer who plays as a midfielder for Albanian club Erzeni.

== Career statistics ==
=== Club ===
As of 29 November 2017

Club statistics
Club	Season	League			Cup		Europe (Note: Including continental competitions, such as UEFA Champions League and UEFA Europa League)		Total	
Club	Season	Division	Apps	Goals	Apps	Goals	Apps	Goals	Apps	Goals
Vllaznia Shkodër B	2015–16	Albanian Third Division	3	0	—		—		3	0
Luftëtari	2016–17	Albanian Superliga	14	0	4	1	—		18	1
Luftëtari	2017–18	Albanian Superliga	2	0	3	1	—		5	1
Luftëtari	Total		16	0	7	1	—		23	1
Career total			19	0	7	1	—		26	1
