= Kristal Abazaj =

Albanian footballer (born 1996)

Personal information
- Date of birth: 6 July 1996 (age 30)
- Place of birth: Elbasan, Albania
- Height: 1.83 m (6 ft 0 in)
- Position: Right winger

Team information
- Current team: Drita
- Number: 77

Youth career
- 2011–2013: Dinamo Tirana
- 2013–2015: Partizani Tirana
- 2015: Elbasani

Senior career*
Years	Team	Apps	(Gls)
2015–2016	Elbasani	13	(7)
2016–2018	Luftëtari FC	66	(16)
2018–2020	Anderlecht	1	(0)
2019	→ Osijek (loan)	9	(1)
2019–2020	→ Kukësi (loan)	34	(10)
2020–2023	İstanbulspor	40	(4)
2023–2024	Tirana	50	(15)
2024–2025	Ankara Keçiörengücü	14	(1)
2025–	Drita	28	(6)

International career^{‡}
2017–2018	Albania U21	10	(3)
2018	Albania	2	(0)
- * Club domestic league appearances and goals as of 22 June 2026 ‡ National team caps and goals as of 9 November 2022

Kristal Abazaj (born 6 July 1996) is an Albanian professional footballer who plays as a right winger for Drita.

== Club career ==
=== Luftëtari Gjirokastër ===
In July 2016, Abazaj went on trial with top flight side Luftëtari FC, a trail which he successfully passed, and in August 2016 signed the contract. He made his competitive debut as well as his first Albanian Superliga appearance in the opening matchday of 2016–17 season against Partizani Tirana which finished in a 0–1 loss. He finished his first season with Luftëtari by making 35 appearances, including 33 in league, 30 of them as starter, collecting 2507 minutes and scoring 3 goals as Lufëtari finished 4th in the championship. Abazaj was distinguished for his performances throughout the season and at the end of the campaign he was named one of the talents of the season.

During the summer transfer window, Lufëtari declined several offers for Abazaj from in and outside the country. He started the second season on strong form, netting his team's only goal in the 2–1 defeat to Teuta Durrës in the opening week of championship. This was followed by another one which turned out to be the winner as Lufëtari defeated Laçi for the first three points of the season.

On 17 December, Abazaj scored in the matchday 15 versus Partizani Tirana after collecting the ball on the right side near the halfway line, running 70 metres (229 ft), nutmegging Labinot Ibrahimi before beating Alban Hoxha with a right-footed shoot in an eventual 5–0 home win. He was named Albanian Superliga Player of the Month for December after bagging three goals in four matches, helping the team in their bid to escape relegation.

At the end of the 2017–18, Abazaj was named Albanian Superliga Talent of the Season, becoming the second ever Luftëtari player to win it.

=== Skënderbeu Korçë ===
On 5 January 2018, Skënderbeu Korçë announced to have signed a pre-contract with Abazaj for €300,000. The player continued to represent Luftëtari as loanee until the end of the season.

=== Anderlecht ===
On 16 April 2018, it was announced that Abazaj has signed a three-year contract with Belgian side Anderlecht. The transfer fee reportedly was €750,000 and the player will join the club on 1 July 2018.

=== Tirana ===
On 22 January 2023, Abazaj joined capital club KF Tirana by inking a one-and-a-half-year contract, taking the vacant squad number 77. He made his debut four days later in the 2–0 away win over Erzeni.

Shortly after, he was struck by an injury which kept him out of action for more than a month. He returned in training in early March, and scored his first goals for the White and Blues on 16 April in the 2–1 comeback win over Egnatia.

== International career ==
=== Youth ===
After a good run of form with Luftëtari, on 17 March 2017 Abazaj was named by manager Alban Bushi in the Albania under-21 squad to face Moldova in a double friendly match. He made his first appearance on 25 March by playing 66 minutes as the first match finished in a goalless draw. Abazaj scored his first goal two days later to lead Albania into a 2–0 win.

Abazaj continued to be part of the under-21 squad as he was called up in June for the friendly against France and the opening qualifying match of 2019 UEFA European Under-21 Championship against Estonia. He made his competitive debut on 12 June against Estonia playing 86 minutes in the goalless draw. Abazaj scored his first goals of the campaign in the matchday 3 against Iceland on 4 September 2017 where he scored twice to help Albania take an away 2–3 win, the first in Group 2.

=== Senior ===
Abazaj received his first Albania senior call-up by manager Christian Panucci on 16 March 2018 for the friendly match against Norway and he became the first Luftëtari player in 30 years to be called up at senior side. On 29 May 2018, Abazaj made his debut with Albania in friendly match against Kosovo after coming on as a substitute at 69th minute in place of Emanuele Ndoj.

== Personal life ==
Abazaj has cited his role model and favourite footballer the Brazilian striker Ronaldo. In an interview in December 2018, Abazaj unveiled that he is a longtime fan of KF Tirana, adding that he used to go with his family to watch their games in stadium when he was young.

== Career statistics ==
=== Club ===
As of match played 3 August 2023

Appearances and goals by club, season and competition
Club	Season	League			Cup		Europe		Total	
Club	Season	Division	Apps	Goals	Apps	Goals	Apps	Goals	Apps	Goals
Elbasani	2015–16	Kategoria e Parë	13	7	—		—		13	7
Luftëtari FC	2016–17	Kategoria Superiore	33	3	2	0	—		35	3
Luftëtari FC	2017–18	Kategoria Superiore	29	8	3	0	—		35	13
Luftëtari FC	Total		62	12	5	0	—		67	16
Anderlecht	2018–19	Belgian Pro League	1	0	—		—		1	0
Anderlecht	2019–20	Belgian Pro League	0	0	—		—		0	0
Anderlecht	Total		1	0	—		—		1	0
Osijek (loan)	2018–19	Prva HNL	9	1	—		—		9	1
Kukësi (loan)	2019–20	Kategoria Superiore	34	10	4	0	—		38	10
İstanbulspor	2020–21	TFF First League	30	4	0	0	—		30	4
İstanbulspor	2021–22	TFF First League	5	0	—		—		5	0
İstanbulspor	2022–23	Süper Lig	5	0	—		—		5	0
İstanbulspor	Total		40	4	0	0	—		40	4
Tirana	2022–23	Kategoria Superiore	14	4	1	0	—		15	4
Tirana	2023–24	Kategoria Superiore	36	11	0	0	4 (Note: Appearances in UEFA Europa League)	0	4	0
Tirana	Total		50	15	1	0	4	0	19	4
Career total			173	38	10	0	4	0	187	38

=== International ===
As of 9 November 2022

Appearances and goals by national team and year
National team	Year	Apps	Goals
Albania	2018	1	0
Albania	2019	1	0
Total		2	0

== Honours ==
Tirana

- Kategoria Superiore:
  - Runner-up:2022–23
- Kupa e Shqipërisë
  - Runner-up:2022–23

FC Drita

- Kosovo Superleague 2025-26

Individual

- Albanian Superliga Player of the Month: December 2017
- Albanian Superliga Talent of the Season: 2017–18
