= Albi Prifti =

Albanian footballer

Personal information
- Full name: Albi Prifti
- Date of birth: 5 August 1993 (age 33)
- Place of birth: Fier, Albania
- Position: Midfielder

Youth career
- 2008–2012: Apolonia

Senior career*
Years	Team	Apps	(Gls)
2012–2015	Apolonia	19	(0)
- * Club domestic league appearances and goals as of 26 March 2015

Albi Prifti (born 5 August 1993 in Fier) is an Albanian retired footballer who played for Apolonia Fier in the Albanian Superliga. His older brother Andi also plays for Apolonia Fier.
