= Ergis Mersini =

Albanian footballer

Personal information
- Full name: Ergis Mersini
- Date of birth: 30 September 1988 (age 38)
- Place of birth: Gjirokastër, Albania
- Position: Left-back

Youth career
- 2005–2007: Tirana

Senior career*
Years	Team	Apps	(Gls)
2009–2011	Teuta Durrës	13	(1)
2011–2013	Luftëtari	50	(5)
2013–2014	Dinamo Tirana	25	(0)
2014–2017	Luftëtari	65	(7)
2017–2018	Flamurtari	26	(0)
2018	Vllaznia	17	(0)
2018	Vllaznia B	1	(0)
2018–2019	Trepça'89	23	(0)
2019–2020	Oriku	10	(0)
- * Club domestic league appearances and goals as of 26 January 2017

Ergis Mersini (born 30 September 1988) is an Albanian former professional footballer who last played as a left-back for Albanian side Oriku.

== Club career ==
Mersini is a youth product of KF Tirana and started his professional career with SK Skrapari.

In July 2013, Mersini joined Albanian First Division side Dinamo Tirana on a one-year contract.

On 23 January 2017, Mersini left Luftëtari Gjirokastër by terminating his contract by mutual consent. He departure was made de facto in the first days of January, where he was not called up in team's winter training camp on Antalya, Turkey, after being told by the coach Mladen Milinković that he was not in his plans for the second part of the season.

Three days later, however, Mersini joined Flamurtari Vlorë for the second part of 2016–17 season. He made his debut with the club on 28 January 2017 against Skënderbeu Korçë as Flamurtari slumped into a 1–0 away defeat. Mersini quickly established himself in the starting lineup and went on to play another 16 matches, all of them as starter, until the end of the season, as Flamutari barely avoided relegation by winning in the last match against Korabi Peshkopi.

On 28 June 2017, Mersini signed a new contract extension with Flamurtari until June 2018.

== Honours ==
Luftëtari Gjirokastër

- Albanian First Division: 2011–12, 2015–16
