= Bruno Fistori =

Argentine footballer

Personal information
- Full name: Bruno Santiago Fistori
- Date of birth: January 11, 1991 (age 35)
- Place of birth: Córdoba, Argentina
- Height: 1.99 m (6 ft 6 in)
- Position: Forward

Senior career*
Years	Team	Apps	(Gls)
2011	Independiente Medellín	1	(0)
2012–2013	Sportivo Atenas	14	(5)
2013–2014	Tërbuni Pukë	4	(0)
2014	Dock Sud	3	(0)
2014–2015	Jorge Newbery	12	(3)
2015	San Lorenzo de Alem		
- * Club domestic league appearances and goals

Bruno Santiago Fistori (born January 11, 1991, in Córdoba, Argentina) is an Argentine footballer who plays as a forward for Independiente Medellín of the Primera A in Colombia.

== Career ==
In February 2015 Fistori joined Dock Sud from Albanian club Tërbuni Pukë.

== Teams ==
- (Argentina) Chacarita Juniors 2010–2011
- (Colombia) Independiente Medellín 2011–2012
