= Denis Peposhi =

Albanian footballer

Personal information
- Date of birth: 1 February 1995 (age 31)
- Place of birth: Kukes, Albania
- Height: 1.82 m (6 ft 0 in)
- Position: Striker

Youth career
- 2010–2014: Tirana

Senior career*
Years	Team	Apps	(Gls)
2015–2016	Kukesi	0	(0)
2016–2017	Korabi	20	(0)
2017–2018	Kamza	0	(0)
2017–2018	Drenica	10	(7)
2018–2019	Liria Prizren	4	(0)
- * Club domestic league appearances and goals

Denis Peposhi (born 1 February 1995) is an Albanian former professional footballer who played as a striker.
