= Pericles (footballer, born 1989) =

Brazilian footballer (born 1989)

Personal information
- Full name: Junior Pericles Pinto Catarina
- Date of birth: 4 November 1989 (age 37)
- Place of birth: Rio de Janeiro, Brazil
- Height: 1.74 m (5 ft 9 in)
- Position: Attacking midfielder

Senior career*
Years	Team	Apps	(Gls)
2011–2012	Independiente	5	(0)
2012–2014	Isidro Metapán	23	(0)
2014–2015	Kukësi	0	(0)
2014	→ Sopoti Librazhd (loan)	9	(0)
2015	→ Adriatiku (loan)	12	(2)
2015–2016	Pogradeci	24	(5)
2016	Laçi	10	(1)
- * Club domestic league appearances and goals

Junior Pericles Pinto Catarina (born 4 November 1989), commonly known as Pericles, is a Brazilian former footballer who played as an attacking midfielder.
