= Mamurras Stadium =

- Former names: Fusha Sportive e Mamurrasit
- Location: Mamurras, Albania
- Owner: KF Adriatiku Mamurrasi
- Capacity: 1,000
- Surface: Grass

Tenant
- KF Adriatiku Mamurrasi

Mamurras Stadium is a multi-use stadium in Mamurras, Albania. The stadium has a capacity of 1,000 people and it is mostly used for football matches and it is the home ground of KF Adriatiku Mamurrasi.
