= Donald Rapo =

Albanian footballer

Personal information
- Full name: Donald Rapo
- Date of birth: 4 October 1990 (age 36)
- Place of birth: Tirana, Albania
- Height: 1.83 m (6 ft 0 in)
- Position: Left-back

Senior career*
Years	Team	Apps	(Gls)
2011–2014	Olimpic	73	(6)
2014–2015	Burreli	21	(4)
2015–2020	Luftëtari	125	(11)
2020	Laçi	24	(3)
2021	Drenica	13	(2)
2021	Kukësi	0	(0)
- * Club domestic league appearances and goals as of 17:17, 16 January 2022 (UTC)

Donald Rapo (born 4 October 1990) is an Albanian professional football player who plays as a left-back.

== Club career ==
=== Burreli ===
In August 2014, Rapo moved to Kategoria e Parë club KS Burreli. He made his league debut for the club on 27 September 2014 in a 1–0 away loss to Besëlidhja. He played all ninety minutes of the match, receiving a yellow card in the 77th minute. He scored his first league goal for the club on 13 December 2014 in a match against the same side he made his debut against, Besëlidhja. The match ended 2–1 in favor of Burreli. His goal, scored in the 85th minute, made the score 2–1. He played all ninety minutes of the match.

=== Luftëtari ===
In the summer 2015, Rapo moved to then Kategoria e Parë side Luftëtari. He made his league debut for the club on 12 September 2015 in a 2–0 away victory over Dinamo. He was subbed on for Mustafa Agastra in the 67th minute. He scored his first league goal for the club came after their promotion to the Kategoria Superiore. It came on 22 December 2016 in a 2–2 home draw with FK Kukësi. His goal, scored in the 88th minute, made the score 2–2. He was subbed off three minutes later, being replaced by Brixhild Brahimaj.

=== Kukësi ===
In July 2021, FK Kukësi announced to have signed Rapo on a two-year contract. Soon following his arrival, the defender fell out of favor with manager Diego Longo, who excluded him from the team. Rapo did not play a single match in the Kategoria Superiore, but did feature six times on the bench. He did, however, play in two cup matches against KF Maliqi in the first round. In December, he announced his departure from the club.

== Honours ==
Luftëtari

- Kategoria e Parë (1): 2015–16
