= Vangjel Zguro =

Albanian footballer

Personal information
- Full name: Vangjel Zguro
- Date of birth: 4 March 1993 (age 33)
- Place of birth: Pogradec, Albania
- Height: 1.83 m (6 ft 0 in)
- Position: Left-back

Youth career
- 2010–2012: Pogradeci

Senior career*
Years	Team	Apps	(Gls)
2011–2014	Pogradeci	56	(4)
2014–2015	Butrinti	9	(2)
2015–2016	Pogradeci	20	(3)
2016–2017	Korabi	10	(0)
2017–2018	Luftëtari	25	(0)
2018	Kamza	16	(1)
2018	Kukësi	11	(0)
2019	Red Wolves	25	(1)
2020	FC Tulsa	9	(0)
2021–2022	Skënderbeu	56	(5)
2023	Bylis Ballsh	17	(1)
2023–2024	Struga	31	(3)
2024	Partizani	3	(0)
2025–2026	Pogradeci	46	(8)
- * Club domestic league appearances and goals as of 19 June 2026

Vangjel Zguro (born 4 March 1993) is an Albanian professional footballer who plays as a left-back.

== Club career ==
=== Korabi Peshkopi ===
In July 2016, Zguro joined newly promoted Albanian Superliga side Korabi Peshkopi by signing a one-year contract. He made his team debut as well as Albanian Superliga debut on 2 October in the 3–2 away win over Teuta Durrës.

On 27 December, following the end of the first part of the season, Zguro was released from his contract, ending his cooperation with the club, becoming a free agent in the process.

=== Luftëtari Gjirokastër ===
Within a day after his release, Zguro joined fellow Albanian Superliga side Luftëtari Gjirokastër on a free transfer. He was presented to the media on the same day where he apologized for the incidents back when he was part of Pogradeci.

=== Kamza ===
On 9 January 2018, Zguro agreed to personal terms and joined Kamza. After penning the contract, he then flew out to Antalya, Turkey to link up with the rest of the squad on their winter training camp. He was presented four days later where he was given squad number 31 for the second part of 2017–18 season. Zguro made his first Kamza appearance on 26 January in the home match versus Laçi, receiving a yellow card in 49th minute as the team won 3–1.

He scored his maiden goal for the club, also his first in two years, on 14 April in the 3–2 loss to Skënderbeu Korçë, netting the temporarily equalizer with a free kick. Zguro played 16 times in the second part of 2017–18 season, as Kazma narrowly escaped relegation by winning in the final match versus Partizani Tirana.

=== Kukësi ===
On 17 June 2018, Kukësi announced to have signed Zguro on a one-year contract, with the defender taking squad number 8.

=== Chattanooga Red Wolves ===
On 2 January 2019, Zguro joined USL League One side Chattanooga Red Wolves ahead of their inaugural season.

=== FC Tulsa ===
On 23 December 2019, Zguro moved up to the USL Championship, joining FC Tulsa ahead of their 2020 season.

=== Skënderbeu ===
In January 2022, Zguro returned to Albania and signed for KF Skënderbeu Korçë.

== Career statistics ==
As of 23 May 2018

Club	Season	League			Cup		Continental		Total	
Club	Season	Division	Apps	Goals	Apps	Goals	Apps	Goals	Apps	Goals
Pogradeci	2011–12	Albanian First Division	?	?	2	0	—		2	0
Pogradeci	2012–13	Albanian First Division	27	2	0	0	—		27	2
Pogradeci	2013–14	Albanian First Division	25	2	0	0	—		25	2
Pogradeci	2014–15	Albanian First Division	4	0	0	0	—		4	0
Pogradeci	Total		56	4	2	0	—		58	4
Butrinti Sarandë	2014–15	Albanian First Division	9	2	0	0	—		9	2
Pogradeci	2015–16	Albanian First Division	20	3	1	0	—		21	3
Korabi Peshkopi	2016–17	Albanian Superliga	10	0	1	0	—		11	0
Luftëtari Gjirokastër	2016–17	Albanian Superliga	15	0	0	0	—		15	0
Luftëtari Gjirokastër	2017–18	Albanian Superliga	10	0	1	0	—		11	0
Luftëtari Gjirokastër	Total		25	0	1	0	—		26	0
Kamza	2017–18	Albanian Superliga	16	1	0	0	—		16	1
Kukësi	2018–19	Albanian Superliga	0	0	0	0	0	0	0	0
Career total			136	10	5	0	—		141	10
