= Besmir Arifaj =

Albanian professional footballer

Personal information
- Full name: Besmir Arifaj
- Date of birth: 6 May 1986 (age 40)
- Place of birth: Pukë, Albania
- Height: 1.80 m (5 ft 11 in)
- Position: Midfielder

Youth career
- 2000–2004: Partizani Tirana

Senior career*
Years	Team	Apps	(Gls)
2004–2006	Partizani Tirana	3	(0)
2006–2007	Flamurtari Vlorë	18	(0)
2007–2008	Kastrioti Krujë	11	(1)
2008–2009	Flamurtari Vlorë	32	(2)
2009–2010	Kastrioti Krujë	12	(0)
2010–2011	Tomori Berat	13	(0)
2011–2012	Dinamo Tirana	19	(3)
2012–2013	Bylis Ballsh	16	(0)
2013–2015	Dinamo Tirana	66	(6)
2016	Luftëtari FC	11	(1)
2016–2017	Dinamo Tirana	7	(1)
2017	Korabi	17	(0)

International career
2001–2003	Albania U17	5	(0)
2003–2005	Albania U19	8	(0)
2007–2008	Albania U21	5	(0)
- * Club domestic league appearances and goals as of 20 January 2017

Besmir Arifaj (born 6 May 1986) is an Albanian professional footballer who plays as a midfielder.

== Club career ==
=== Bylis Ballsh ===
On 8 August 2012, Arifaj agreed personal term and signed a two-year contract with Bylis Ballsh. He made his first appearance for the new club on 26 August in the opening Albanian Superliga week against Flamurtari Vlorë, entering as a second-half substitute in a 1–1 draw. During the course of 2012–13 season, Arifaj made 25 appearances, including 18 in league, as Bylis barley assured the survival in Superliga. He also made 9 appearances in cup, as Bylis reached the final for the first time in history, losing out to Laçi after extra time, as Arifaj was sent-off during the match. During this competition, he scored in the 3–1 home win against Luftëtari FC. He left the club following the end of the season.

=== Luftëtari Gjirokastr ===
In January 2016, Arifaj joined fellow Albanian First Division side Luftëtari FC until the end of the season. He made his debut on 13 February in the league encounter against Lushnja, playing for 57 minutes in an eventual 0–1 away win. Arifaj scored his first goal of the campaign on 30 April, netting the lone goal of the match against Sopoti Librazhd. The team finished the Group B in the first position with 68 points, and was promoted to Albanian Superliga for the first time since 2012. Following the end of the season, the club terminated the contract with Arifaj by mutual consent, making him a free agent in the process.

=== Third spell at Dinamo Tirana ===
On 29 July 2016, Arifaj returned to Dinamo Tirana for the second time by signing a one-year contract.

=== Korabi Peshkopi ===
On 19 January 2017, Arifaj signed a contract until the end of the season with Albanian Superliga Korabi Peshkopi.

== Honours ==
Dinamo Tirana

- Albanian Cup: 2008–09

Luftëtari Gjirokastër

- Albanian First Division: 2015–16
