= Rudin Nako =

Albanian footballer

Personal information
- Full name: Rudin Nako
- Date of birth: 27 May 1987 (age 39)
- Place of birth: Fier, Albania
- Position: Centre back

Team information
- Current team: Lushnja
- Number: 6

Youth career
- 2004–2008: Apolonia

Senior career*
Years	Team	Apps	(Gls)
2010–2011	Albpetrol	30	(0)
2012–2016	Apolonia	97	(7)
2016	Korabi	11	(0)
2017	Bylis	13	(3)
2017–2018	Egnatia	26	(6)
2018–2019	Apolonia	32	(2)
2020–	Lushnja	9	(0)
- * Club domestic league appearances and goals as of 20:27, 22 August 2020 (UTC)

Rudin Nako (born 20 May 1987) is an Albanian footballer who currently plays for KF Lushnja in the Albanian First Division.
