= Andi Prifti =

Albanian footballer

Personal information
- Date of birth: 1 August 1988 (age 38)
- Place of birth: Fier, Albania
- Height: 1.80 m (5 ft 11 in)
- Position: Right-back

Youth career
- –2007: Apolonia

Senior career*
Years	Team	Apps	(Gls)
2006–2016	Apolonia	64+	(0+)
2008	→ Albpetrol (loan)		
2009	→ Çlirimi (loan)	10	(0)
2009–2010	→ Albpetrol (loan)		
2011–2012	→ Albpetrol (loan)		
2016	Korabi	9	(0)
2017	Bylis	11	(0)
2017–2018	Albpetrol		
2019–2019	Apolonia	10	(0)
Total		104+	(0+)
- * Club domestic league appearances and goals

Andi Prifti (born 1 August 1988) is an Albanian former professional footballer who spent the majority of his career at Apolonia as a defender. His younger brother Albi is also a former professional footballer who played for Apolonia.
