= Ted Laço =

Albanian footballer

Personal information
- Date of birth: 1 February 1995 (age 31)
- Place of birth: Korçë, Albania
- Height: 1.86 m (6 ft 1 in)
- Position: Goalkeeper

Youth career
- 2010–2014: Dinamo Tirana

Senior career*
Years	Team	Apps	(Gls)
2012–2014	Dinamo Tirana	1	(0)
2014–2015	Besa	6	(0)
2015–2016	Elbasani	2	(0)
2016–2017	Erzeni	3	(0)
2017–2018	Korabi	18	(0)
2018–2019	Dinamo Tirana	26	(0)
2019–2020	Vllaznia	1	(0)

International career
2013–2014	Albania U19	2	(0)
- * Club domestic league appearances and goals

Ted Laço (born 1 February 1995) is an Albanian former footballer who played as a goalkeeper.
