= Bruno Toledo (footballer) =

Uruguayan footballer (born 1994)

Personal information
- Full name: Bruno Nicolás Toledo Danta
- Date of birth: 25 August 1994 (age 32)
- Place of birth: Montevideo, Uruguay
- Height: 1.74 m (5 ft 9 in)
- Position: Right back

Team information
- Current team: Luftëtari Gjirokastër
- Number: 2

Youth career
- –2014: Liverpool (Montevideo)

Senior career*
Years	Team	Apps	(Gls)
2006–2008	Liverpool (Montevideo)	19	(0)
2017–	Luftëtari Gjirokastër	9	(0)
- * Club domestic league appearances and goals as of 4 July 2018

Bruno Nicolás Toledo Dante (born 25 August 1994) is a Uruguayan footballer who plays for Luftëtari Gjirokastër in the Albanian Superliga.
