= Bruno Aquino =

Brazilian footballer (born 1991)

Personal information
- Full name: Bruno Aquino Morais
- Date of birth: 21 June 1991 (age 35)
- Place of birth: Campo Grande, Brazil
- Height: 1.75 m (5 ft 9 in)
- Position: Forward

Senior career*
Years	Team	Apps	(Gls)
2011	Goiás	5	(0)
2012	Aparecidense	10	(5)
2013	Red Bull Brasil	5	(1)
2013	Goianésia	2	(0)
2014	Boa	15	(4)
2014	Treze	10	(1)
2015	Mamoré	7	(1)
2015	Tupi	14	(2)
2016	Taubaté	15	(5)
2016	Altos	9	(1)
2016–2017	Laçi	15	(3)
2017	XV de Piracicaba	10	(1)
2017–2018	Altos	4	(0)
2018	Anápolis	5	(4)
2018	Itumbiara	3	(2)
2019	URT	5	(0)
- * Club domestic league appearances and goals

Bruno Aquino Morais (born 21 June 1991) is a Brazilian former footballer who played as a forward.

== Early career ==
Born in Campo Grande, Bruno Aquino began playing football in the youth system of local side Clube Esportivo Nova Esperança (CENE). At age 16, he played for the club's senior team in the Campeonato Sul-Mato-Grossense, scoring three goals in four matches. CENE sold his contract rights to a group of businessmen, and he signed for União São João Esporte Clube at age 17. Bruno Aquino struggled to adapt in União São João's youth system, and moved on to Goiás Esporte Clube.

== Career ==
=== Goiás ===
At Goiás, Bruno Aquino broke into the senior team, and would make his professional debut in the Campeonato Brasileiro Série B.
