= Alfred Zefi =

Albanian footballer

Personal information
- Full name: Alfred Zefi
- Date of birth: 20 August 1991 (age 35)
- Place of birth: Lezhë, Albania
- Position: Defensive midfielder

Team information
- Current team: Tomori
- Number: 22

Youth career
- 2006–2010: Laçi

Senior career*
Years	Team	Apps	(Gls)
2010–2016	Laçi	111	(4)
2016–2017	Korabi	29	(0)
2017–2018	Kamza	17	(0)
2018–2019	Bylis Ballsh	22	(0)
2019–2020	Besa Kavajë	17	(0)
2020–2021	Burreli	20	(0)
2021–2022	Tomori	22	(0)
2022–2023	Pogradeci		
2023–2024	Butrinti		
- * Club domestic league appearances and goals as of 20:09, 21 September 2021 (UTC)

Alfred Zefi (born 20 August 1991) is an Albanian former professional footballer who last played as a defensive midfielder for Albanian club Butrinti.

== Club career ==
=== Korabi Peshkopi ===
On 1 July 2016, Zefi joined newly promoted Albanian Superliga side Korabi Peshkopi by penning a one-year contract for an undisclosed fee. He signed along with 12 other players, five of them being his teammates at Laçi. He was given squad number 22, and made his competitive debut on 7 September in the opening 2016–17 Albanian Superliga week against Laçi, appearing in the last 13 minutes of an eventual goalless draw. On 12 February of the following year, during the matchday 21 against Luftëtari Gjirokastër, Zefi was sent-off in the 61st minute for headbutting a player of Luftëtari, as the match finished with a 2–0 defeat for Zefi's side. This led the Disciplinary Committee to ban him for the following five league matches.

=== Kamza ===
In July 2017, Zefi signed with fellow promoted top flight side Kamza. He played his first match for his new side on 9 September in the opening week of 2017–18 Albanian Superliga against Kukësi, playing 64 minutes in a 1–0 loss. In his first season at Kamza, Zefi made 17 league appearances as Kamza retained their top flight spot by winning in the final matchday against Partizani Tirana. He left the club in July 2018.

=== Bylis Ballsh ===
In August 2018, Zefi left Albanian Superliga after eight seasons and joined Albanian First Division side Bylis Ballsh.

== Career statistics ==
As of 9 September 2018

Club statistics
Club	Season	League			Cup		Europe		Other		Total	
Club	Season	Division	Apps	Goals	Apps	Goals	Apps	Goals	Apps	Goals	Apps	Goals
Laçi	2010–11	Albanian Superliga	8	0	0	0	—		—		8	4
Laçi	2011–12	Albanian Superliga	23	1	11	2	—		—		34	3
Laçi	2012–13	Albanian Superliga	17	2	11	0	—		—		28	2
Laçi	2013–14	Albanian Superliga	27	0	4	0	2 (Note: All appearance(s) in UEFA Europa League)	0	1 (Note: Appearance in Albanian Supercup)	0	34	0
Laçi	2014–15	Albanian Superliga	26	1	6	1	4	0	—		36	2
Laçi	2015–16	Albanian Superliga	10	0	4	0	—		—		14	0
Laçi	Total		111	4	36	3	6	0	1	0	154	7
Korabi Peshkopi	2016–17	Albanian Superliga	29	0	3	0	—		—		31	0
Kamza	2017–18	Albanian Superliga	17	0	3	0	—		—		20	0
Bylis Ballsh	2018–19	Albanian First Division	1	0	0	0	—		—		1	0
Career total			158	4	41	3	6	0	1	0	206	7

== Honours ==
Laçi

- Albanian Cup: 2012–13, 2014–15
