= Gabriel Steven =

Nigerian footballer

Personal information
- Full name: Gabriel Steven
- Date of birth: 15 August 1994 (age 32)
- Place of birth: Lagos, Nigeria
- Position: Midfielder

Team information
- Current team: Kastrioti Krujë
- Number: 6

Senior career*
Years	Team	Apps	(Gls)
2013	FK Vora	9	(0)
2013–2014	KS Burreli	23	(2)
2014	Tërbuni Pukë	2	(0)
2015–	Kastrioti Krujë	5	(2)
- * Club domestic league appearances and goals

Gabriel Steven (born 15 August 1994 in Lagos) is a Nigerian footballer who currently plays for Kastrioti Krujë in the Albanian First Division.
