= Eduard Rroca =

Albanian footballer

Personal information
- Date of birth: 28 July 1993 (age 33)
- Place of birth: Librazhd, Albania
- Height: 1.83 m (6 ft 0 in)
- Positions: Attacking midfielder; forward

Team information
- Current team: Drita
- Number: 8

Senior career*
Years	Team	Apps	(Gls)
2011–2012	Egnatia	13	(0)
2012–2015	Tërbuni	62	(11)
2015–2018	Luftëtari	87	(12)
2019–2020	Kukësi	47	(7)
2020–2024	İstanbulspor	68	(12)
2024	→ Manisa (loan)	10	(1)
2024–2026	Ankara Keçiörengücü	53	(9)
2026–	Drita	2	(0)
- * Club domestic league appearances and goals as of 5 May 2026

Eduard Rroca (born 28 July 1993) is an Albanian professional footballer who plays for Kosovan club Drita.

== Club career ==
=== Luftëtari ===
In September 2015, Rroca moved to then Kategoria e Parë club Luftëtari. He made his league debut for the club on 12 September 2015 in a 2–0 away victory over Dinamo Tirana. He played all ninety minutes of that match. He scored his first league goal for the club a little over a month later, in a 3–1 away victory over Butrinti on 24 October 2015. His goal, the first of the match, came in the 27th minute.

=== Kukësi ===
Rroca signed for fellow Kategoria Superiore club Kukësi on 19 December 2018 for a fee of €50,000, signing a two-year contract until the end of 2020.

=== İstanbulspor ===
Rroca joined Turkish club İstanbulspor in the TFF First League on 18 September 2020 for a fee of €50,000. The Turkish club had originally sent their representative to scout his Kukësi teammate Valon Ethemi, but were impressed by Rroca and made an offer to sign the player soon after. He chose to wear the number 61 shirt and he made his debut for the club in a 3–1 away win against Ümraniyespor on 26 September 2020, starting the game on the left-hand side of midfield. He scored his first official goals for the club in a 3–0 away win over Samsunspor on 17 October 2020, scoring in the 53rd and 57th minute, before assisting Kamal Issah in the 91st minute for the final goal.

== Honours ==
Luftëtari

- Kategoria e Parë: 2015–16
