= Festim Miraka =

Albanian footballer

Personal information
- Full name: Festim Miraka
- Date of birth: 31 December 1987 (age 38)
- Place of birth: Gramsh, Albania
- Position: Goalkeeper

Team information
- Current team: Burreli
- Number: 1

Senior career*
Years	Team	Apps	(Gls)
2008–2009	Turbina Cërrik		
2009–2010	Luftëtari		
2010–2011	Lushnja		
2011	Luz i Vogël		
2012	Tërbuni Pukë		
2012–2015	Pogradeci	69	(0)
2015–2017	Luftëtari	49	(0)
2018–2019	Besa	37	(0)
2019–2020	Bylis	3	(0)
2020–	Burreli	16	(0)
- * Club domestic league appearances and goals as of 19:07, 2 April 2021 (UTC)

Festim Miraka (born 31 December 1987) is an Albanian professional footballer who plays as a goalkeeper for KF Burreli.

== Club career ==
=== Luftëtari Gjirokastër ===
On 12 October 2017, in the last moments of 2017–18 Albanian Superliga match against Kazma, Miraka conceded a penalty by punching Stevan Račić in the stomach. He was immediately sent off by the referee as Luftëtari conceded and eventually lost the match 1–2 at home. One day later, he was suspended 5 matches by the Disciplinary Committee of Albanian Football Association for unsportsmanlike conduct. Miraka justified his action by saying that the striker insulted him. He was also suspended by club immediately after for an unlimited time until second notice. On 10 November, Miraka terminated his contract with the club and become a free agent in the process, stating: "The suspension without end is not acceptable."
