= Brixhild Brahimaj =

Albanian footballer

Personal information
- Date of birth: 5 December 1995 (age 30)
- Place of birth: Fier, Albania
- Position: Midfielder

Youth career
- Olimpik Tirana

Senior career*
Years	Team	Apps	(Gls)
2014–2015	Olimpik Tirana		
2015	Partizani B		
2015–2016	Internacional Tirana		
2016–2018	Luftëtari	23	(1)
2018	→ Besa (loan)	9	(0)
2018–2019	Elbasani	13	(2)
2019–2020	KF Vora		
2020–2021	Egnatia	31	(1)
- * Club domestic league appearances and goals as of 00:17, 30 September 2019 (UTC)

Brixhild Brahimaj (born 5 December 1995) is an Albanian professional footballer who plays as a midfielder.
