= Behar Ramadani =

Albanian footballer

Personal information
- Full name: Behar Ramadani
- Date of birth: 6 April 1990 (age 36)
- Place of birth: Shkodër, Albania
- Height: 1.79 m (5 ft 10 in)
- Positions: Defender; midfielder

Team information
- Current team: Flamurtari Vlorë
- Number: 16

Youth career
- 2002–2008: Vllaznia Shkodër

Senior career*
Years	Team	Apps	(Gls)
2008–2010	Burreli		
2011–2013	Luftëtari	33	(1)
2013–2014	Vllaznia	2	(0)
2014	Tërbuni	14	(0)
2014–2015	Mamurrasi	23	(1)
2015–2019	Luftëtari	108	(6)
2019–2021	Vllaznia Shkodër	25	(0)
2021	Drenica	14	(0)
2021–	Flamurtari Vlorë	43	(3)
- * Club domestic league appearances and goals as of 1 June 2024

Behar Ramadani (born 6 April 1990) is an Albanian football player who plays as a midfielder for Flamurtari Vlorë in Kategoria e Parë.

== Club career ==
=== Luftëtari Gjirokastër ===
In August 2011, Ramadani moved to then Albanian First Division club Luftëtari Gjirokastër. He made his league debut for the club on 10 September 2011 in a 1–0 home victory over KF Vlora. He played all ninety minutes of the match. He scored his first league goal for the club on 25 February 2012 in a 3–0 home victory over KF Himara. His goal, scored in the 66th minute, came just ten minutes after he had been subbed on, replacing Ermir Strati. He picked up a yellow card in the 85th minute.

=== Vllaznia Shkodër ===
In August 2013, Ramadani was sold to Albanian Superliga club Vllaznia Shkodër. He made his league debut for the club on 31 August 2013 in a 1–0 home loss to Flamurtari Vlorë. He was subbed off at halftime and was replaced by Arenc Dibra.

=== Tërbuni Pukë ===
In January 2014, Ramadani moved again, this time to Albanian First Division club Tërbuni Pukë. He made his league debut for the club on 8 February 2014 in a 3–1 home victory over Elbasani. He played all ninety minutes of the match.

=== Mamurrasi ===
In September 2014, he was sold to Mamurrasi in the Albanian First Division. Ramadani made his league debut for the club on 27 September 2014 in a 2–0 away victory over Kastrioti Krujë. He played all ninety minutes of the match. He scored his first league goal for the club on 6 December 2014 in a 1–0 away victory over Besëlidhja Lezhë. His goal came in the 17th minute of the match. Following a yellow card in the 28th minute, Ramadani picked up a second yellow and was subsequently sent off in the 47th minute.

=== Return to Luftëtari Gjirokastër ===
In September 2015, Ramadani returned to Luftëtari Gjirokastër. He made his first appearance in the league back with the club on 12 September 2015 in a 2–0 away victory over Dinamo Tirana. He played all ninety minutes of the match.

== Honours ==
Luftëtari

- Albanian First Division (2): 2011–12, 2015–16
