= Mustafa Agastra =

Albanian footballer

Personal information
- Date of birth: 4 December 1990 (age 35)
- Place of birth: Lushnjë, Albania
- Position: Striker

Youth career
- 2008–2011: Teuta Durrës

Senior career*
Years	Team	Apps	(Gls)
2011	Apolonia Fier	13	(1)
2012	Tërbuni Pukë	14	(5)
2013	Partizani	8	(1)
2013–2015	Tërbuni Pukë	44	(24)
2015–	Luftëtari FC	11	(4)
2016	Pogradeci	10	(5)
2016–2017	Elbasani	5	(0)
2017	Tomori	10	(0)
2018–	Nacka Iliria	28	(19)
- * Club domestic league appearances and goals

Mustafa Agastra (born 4 December 1990 in Lushnjë) is an Albanian football player who most recently played for Tomori in the Albanian First Division.

== Club career ==
=== Luftëtari ===
Two days after leaving Tërbuni Pukë, Agastra signed for Albanian First Division side Luftëtari FC.

== Honours ==
Individual

- Albanian First Division Top Goalscorer (1): 2013–14
