= Oltion Rapa =

Albanian footballer

Personal information
- Date of birth: 30 September 1989 (age 37)
- Place of birth: Tepelenë, Albania
- Height: 1.83 m (6 ft 0 in)
- Position: Centre-back

Team information
- Current team: Bulqiza

Senior career*
Years	Team	Apps	(Gls)
2008–2009	Maliqi		
2009–2011	Memaliaj		
2011	Luftëtari	0	(0)
2012–2015	Butrinti	84	(2)
2015–2019	Luftëtari	119	(0)
2019–2022	Gjilani	51	(0)
2022–2023	Skënderbeu	21	(0)
2023–2024	Butrinti		
2024–	Bulqiza		
- * Club domestic league appearances and goals as of 19 May 2023

Oltion Rapa (born 30 September 1989) is an Albanian footballer who plays as a centre-back for Bulqiza.

== Honours ==
Luftëtari

- Kategoria e Parë: 2015–16

Skënderbeu

- Kategoria e Parë: 2022–23
