= Shkëlzen Ruçi =

Albanian footballer

Personal information
- Full name: Shkëlzen Ruçi
- Date of birth: 1 July 1992 (age 34)
- Place of birth: Elbasan, Albania
- Position: Goalkeeper

Team information
- Current team: Vora
- Number: 23

Senior career*
Years	Team	Apps	(Gls)
2010–2013	Elbasani	53	(0)
2013–2016	Bylis Ballsh	14	(0)
2014–2015	→ Elbasani (loan)	18	(0)
2016–2019	Luftëtari Gjirokastër	70	(0)
2019–2021	Gjilani	5	(0)
2021–2023	Skënderbeu	29	(0)
2023–	Vora	70	(0)
- * Club domestic league appearances and goals as of 6 March 2026

Shkëlzen Ruçi (born 1 July 1992) is an Albanian professional footballer who plays as a goalkeeper for Vora.

== Club career ==
=== Luftëtari Gjirokastër ===
On 22 July 2016, Ruçi joined Luftëtari Gjirokastër just promoted to top flight by signing until June 2018. He played his first match for the club on 28 September in the first leg of 2016–17 Albanian Cup first round versus his former side Elbasani, keeping a clean-sheet as his side won 1–0. His league debut later on 30 November versus Skënderbeu Korçë, with Luftëtari caused an upset as the match ended in a goalless draw.
