= 2016–17 Kategoria Superiore =

Kategoria Superiore
- Season: 2016–17
- Dates: 7 September 2016 – 27 May 2017
- Champions: Kukësi; 1st Albanian title
- Relegated: Tirana; Korabi
- Champions League: Kukësi
- Europa League: Partizani; Skënderbeu; Tirana
- Matches: 180
- Goals: 340 (1.89 per match)
- Top goalscorer: Pero Pejić (28 goals)
- Biggest home win: Flamurtari 6–0 Korabi (1 April 2017)
- Biggest away win: Korabi 0–4 Luftëtari (22 April 2017); Laçi 1–5 Skënderbeu (23 April 2017); Korabi 0–4 Teuta (6 May 2017)
- Highest scoring: Skënderbeu 4–3 Vllaznia (6 May 2017)

The 2016–17 Kategoria Superiore was the 78th official season, or 81st season of top-tier football in Albania (including three unofficial championships during World War II) and the 17th season under the name Kategoria Superiore. Skënderbeu were the defending champions. The season began on 7 September 2016 and concluded on 27 May 2017.

On 20 May 2017, Kukësi defeated the reigning champions Skënderbeu 2–0 to clinch their first-ever league title, in only their fifth season in the top-flight.

== Teams ==
=== Changes ===
Ten teams competed in the league – the top eight teams from the previous season, as well as two teams promoted from the Kategoria e Parë. Korabi defeated Ada 1–0 at the Reshit Rusi Stadium on the final matchday of the regular season in Group A of the Kategoria e Parë to secure promotion to the Kategoria Superiore after a 54-year absence. Luftëtari were then promoted back to Albanian Superliga after a three-year absence as they defeated Apolonia Fier on the final matchday of the regular season in Group B of the Kategoria e Parë. The two promoted clubs replace Bylis and Tërbuni.

=== Locations ===
Locations of the 2016–17 Kategoria Superiore teams

Team	Home city	Stadium	Capacity	2015–16 season
Flamurtari	Vlorë	Flamurtari Stadium	8,200	8th
Korabi	Peshkopi	Selman Stërmasi Stadium^{(1)}	9,600	Kategoria e Parë
Kukësi	Kukës	Zeqir Ymeri Stadium	5,000	3rd
Laçi	Laç	Laçi Stadium	4,300	7th
Luftëtari	Gjirokastër	Gjirokastra Stadium	8,400	Kategoria e Parë
Partizani	Tirana	Selman Stërmasi Stadium^{(2)}	9,500	2nd
Skënderbeu	Korçë	Skënderbeu Stadium	8,724	Champions
Teuta	Durrës	Niko Dovana Stadium	12,040	4th
Tirana	Tirana	Selman Stërmasi Stadium	9,600	5th
Vllaznia	Shkodër	Loro Boriçi Stadium	16,022	6th

- (1) Korabi play their 2016–17 home games at the Selman Stërmasi Stadium in Tirana. The club's regular home ground, the Korabi Stadium, does not meet the league's licensing criteria to host games.
- (2) Partizani play their 2016–17 home games at the Selman Stërmasi Stadium in Tirana. The club's former home ground, the Qemal Stafa Stadium, was demolished and their new home ground at the Partizani Complex is currently under construction.

=== Stadiums ===
Flamurtari	Korabi	Kukësi	Laçi	Luftëtari
Flamurtari Stadium	Selman Stërmasi Stadium	Zeqir Ymeri Stadium	Laçi Stadium	Gjirokastra Stadium
Capacity: 8,200	Capacity: 9,600	Capacity: 5,000	Capacity: 2,300	Capacity: 8,400
Partizani	Skënderbeu	Teuta	Tirana	Vllaznia
Selman Stërmasi Stadium	Skënderbeu Stadium	Niko Dovana Stadium	Selman Stërmasi Stadium	Loro Boriçi Stadium
Capacity: 9,600	Capacity: 12,000	Capacity: 12,040	Capacity: 9,600	Capacity: 16,022

== League table ==
Pos	Team	Pld	W	D	L	GF	GA	GD	Pts	Qualification or relegation
1	Kukësi (C)	36	20	15	1	51	18	+33	75	Qualification for the Champions League second qualifying round
2	Partizani	36	19	15	2	46	17	+29	72 (Note: Partizani ahead of Skënderbeu on head-to-head record; Partizani–Skënderbeu 0–0, Skënderbeu–Partizani 1–2, Partizani–Skënderbeu 1–0, Skënderbeu–Partizani 2–2.)	Qualification for the Europa League first qualifying round
3	Skënderbeu	36	21	9	6	45	22	+23	72	Qualification for the Europa League first qualifying round
4	Luftëtari	36	11	11	14	37	45	−8	44	
5	Teuta	36	10	10	16	27	34	−7	40	
6	Laçi	36	10	10	16	23	35	−12	40	
7	Vllaznia	36	8	16	12	29	35	−6	40	
8	Flamurtari (Note: Flamurtari were deducted six points for failing to fulfill financial obligations.)	36	12	10	14	42	34	+8	40	
9	Tirana (R)	36	8	15	13	29	32	−3	39	Europa League qualifying and relegation to Kategoria e Parë (Note: Tirana qualified for the Europa League first qualifying round by winning the 2016–17 Albanian Cup.)
10	Korabi (R)	36	2	7	27	11	68	−57	13	Relegation to the 2017–18 Kategoria e Parë

Source: Albanian Football Association (in Albanian), Soccerway
Rules for classification: 1) Points; 2) Head-to-head points; 3) Head-to-head goal difference; 4) Head-to-head goals scored; 5) Goal difference; 6) Goals scored; 7) Draw.
(C) Champions; (R) Relegated

== Results ==
Each team plays every opponent four times, twice at home and twice away, for a total of 36 games.

=== First half of season ===
Home \ Away	FLA	KOR	KUK	LAÇ	LUF	PAR	SKË	TEU	TIR	VLL
Flamurtari	—	4–1	1–1	1–0	5–0	1–1	2–0	0–0	1–0	0–1
Korabi	1–0	—	1–1	0–0	1–1	0–1	0–2	0–1	0–1	0–0
Kukësi	1–0	2–0	—	2–0	1–0	1–0	2–0	3–0	0–0	3–1
Laçi	1–1	1–0	0–0	—	2–2	0–2	0–1	0–2	0–0	1–0
Luftëtari	1–1	1–0	2–2	1–0	—	1–1	0–0	1–0	2–1	1–1
Partizani	4–0	1–0	0–0	2–0	1–0	—	0–0	1–0	0–0	0–0
Skënderbeu	2–1	1–0	0–0	1–0	1–0	1–2	—	1–0	2–0	3–0
Teuta	1–2	2–3	1–2	3–1	2–0	0–2	0–0	—	0–0	0–0
Tirana	3–0	1–1	2–2	1–0	2–0	0–0	2–1	3–1	—	0–0
Vllaznia	2–0	3–0	0–0	1–2	2–3	1–1	0–0	1–0	0–0	—

Source: Albanian Football Association
Legend: Blue = home team win; Yellow = draw; Red = away team win.

=== Second half of season ===
Home \ Away	FLA	KOR	KUK	LAÇ	LUF	PAR	SKË	TEU	TIR	VLL
Flamurtari	—	6–0	1–1	0–0	2–1	1–1	0–1	0–1	2–0	2–0
Korabi	0–3	—	1–3	0–1	0–4	0–2	0–1	0–4	1–1	0–2
Kukësi	1–0	4–0	—	2–1	3–2	0–0	2–0	1–0	4–1	0–0
Laçi	1–0	2–0	0–0	—	2–1	0–1	1–5	2–1	1–0	3–0
Luftëtari	1–2	2–0	1–0	1–1	—	2–0	0–1	1–1	2–1	0–0
Partizani	2–1	3–0	1–1	0–0	2–0	—	1–0	5–1	2–1	2–1
Skënderbeu	1–0	3–0	1–1	1–0	3–0	2–2	—	1–1	1–0	4–3
Teuta	0–0	1–0	0–2	2–0	0–1	0–0	0–1	—	1–0	1–0
Tirana	0–0	2–0	1–2	0–0	2–0	1–2	2–2	0–0	—	1–2
Vllaznia	3–2	1–1	0–1	1–0	2–2	1–1	0–1	0–0	0–0	—

Source: Albanian Football Association
Legend: Blue = home team win; Yellow = draw; Red = away team win.

=== Positions by round ===
The table lists the positions of teams after each week of matches.

Team ╲ Round	1	2	3	4	5	6	7	8	9	10	11	12	13	14	15	16	17	18	19	20	21	22	23	24	25	26	27	28	29	30	31	32	33	34	35	36
Kukësi	7	2	3	3	2	3	3	3	3	1	1	2	1	1	1	1	1	1	1	1	1	1	1	1	1	1	1	2	1	1	1	1	1	1	1	1
Partizani	2	3	2	2	3	2	2	2	2	3	3	3	3	3	3	3	2	2	2	2	3	3	3	3	2	2	2	1	2	2	2	2	3	3	2	2
Skënderbeu	1	1	1	1	1	1	1	1	1	2	2	1	2	2	2	2	3	3	3	3	2	2	2	2	3	3	3	3	3	3	3	3	2	2	3	3
Luftëtari	10	10	7	8	6	6	6	6	6	7	6	6	6	6	6	5	5	5	5	5	4	4	4	4	4	4	4	4	5	4	4	4	4	4	4	4
Teuta	7	9	10	10	10	10	9	10	8	9	8	8	9	8	8	9	9	8	7	9	8	7	7	7	7	7	6	6	7	7	6	6	6	6	5	5
Laçi	7	6	8	7	9	9	7	7	9	8	7	7	8	9	9	8	8	9	9	8	9	8	8	9	9	8	9	8	8	9	9	9	9	8	9	6
Vllaznia	7	6	4	4	5	5	5	5	5	6	5	5	5	5	5	6	6	6	6	6	6	6	6	6	5	5	5	5	4	5	5	5	5	5	6	7
Flamurtari	9	4	5	5	8	7	8	8	7	5	9	9	7	7	7	7	7	7	8	7	7	9	9	8	8	9	8	9	9	8	8	7	7	7	8	8
Tirana	7	6	6	6	4	4	4	4	4	4	4	4	4	4	4	4	4	4	4	4	5	5	5	5	6	6	7	7	6	6	7	8	8	9	7	9
Korabi	7	8	9	9	7	8	10	9	10	10	10	10	10	10	10	10	10	10	10	10	10	10	10	10	10	10	10	10	10	10	10	10	10	10	10	10

Leader and UEFA Champions League second qualifying round
UEFA Europa League first qualifying round
2017–18 Kategoria e Parë

== Season statistics ==
=== Scoring ===
==== Top scorers ====
As of matches played on 27 May 2017.

Rank	Player	Club	Goals
1	(Croatia) Pero Pejić	Kukësi	28
2	(Ghana) Caleb Ekuban	Partizani	17
3	(Albania) Hamdi Salihi	Skënderbeu	15
4	(Albania) Liridon Latifi	Skënderbeu	11
5	(Croatia) Tomislav Bušić	Flamurtari	10
6	(Kosovo) Donjet Shkodra	Flamurtari	9
6	(Albania) Afrim Taku	Tirana	9
6	(Albania) Dejvi Bregu	Luftëtari	9
9	(North Macedonia) Izair Emini	Kukësi	8
9	(Albania) Idriz Batha	Partizani	8
9	(Mozambique) Reginaldo	Luftëtari	8
9	(Nigeria) James Adeniyi	Skënderbeu	8

==== Hat-tricks ====
Player	For	Against	Result	Date	Ref
(Albania) Liridon Latifi	Skënderbeu	Laçi	5–1	23 April 2017	
(Croatia) Pero Pejić	Kukësi	Korabi	3–1	15 May 2017	

Note

^{4} Player scored 4 goals

==== Clean sheets ====
As of matches played on 27 May 2017.

Rank	Player	Club	Clean sheets
1	(Albania) Orges Shehi	Skënderbeu	23
2	(Albania) Alban Hoxha	Partizani	21
2	(Albania) Enea Koliqi	Kukësi	21
3	(Albania) Ilion Lika	Tirana	17
4	(Albania) Gentian Selmani	Tirana	15
6	(Montenegro) Jasmin Agović	Vllaznia	13
7	(Albania) Shpëtim Moçka	Teuta	11
8	(Albania) Argjent Halili	Flamurtari	10
9	(Albania) Shkëlzen Ruçi	Luftëtari	7

=== Discipline ===
As of matches played on 6 May 2017.

==== Player ====
- Most yellow cards: 12
  - Alfred Zefi (Korabi)
  - Vangjel Zguro (Lufëtari)
- Most red cards: 2
  - Arjan Sheta (Korabi)
  - Entonio Pashaj (Kukësi)
  - Stefan Cicmil (Vllaznia)
  - Erjon Vucaj (Tirana/Laçi)

==== Club ====
- Most yellow cards: 104
  - Luftëtari
- Most red cards: 7
  - Luftëtari
  - Korabi

== Attendances ==
#	Club	Average
1	Skënderbeu	2,658
2	Flamurtari	2,505
3	Tirana	2,497
4	Partizani	2,430
5	Vllaznia	2,102
6	Kukësi	2,017
7	Luftëtari	1,299
8	Laçi	1,116
9	Teuta	749
10	Korabi	668
