= Gjirokastra Stadium =

Albanian football stadium

Coordinates: 40°04′52.36″N 20°08′17.13″E

- Stadiumi Gjirokastra
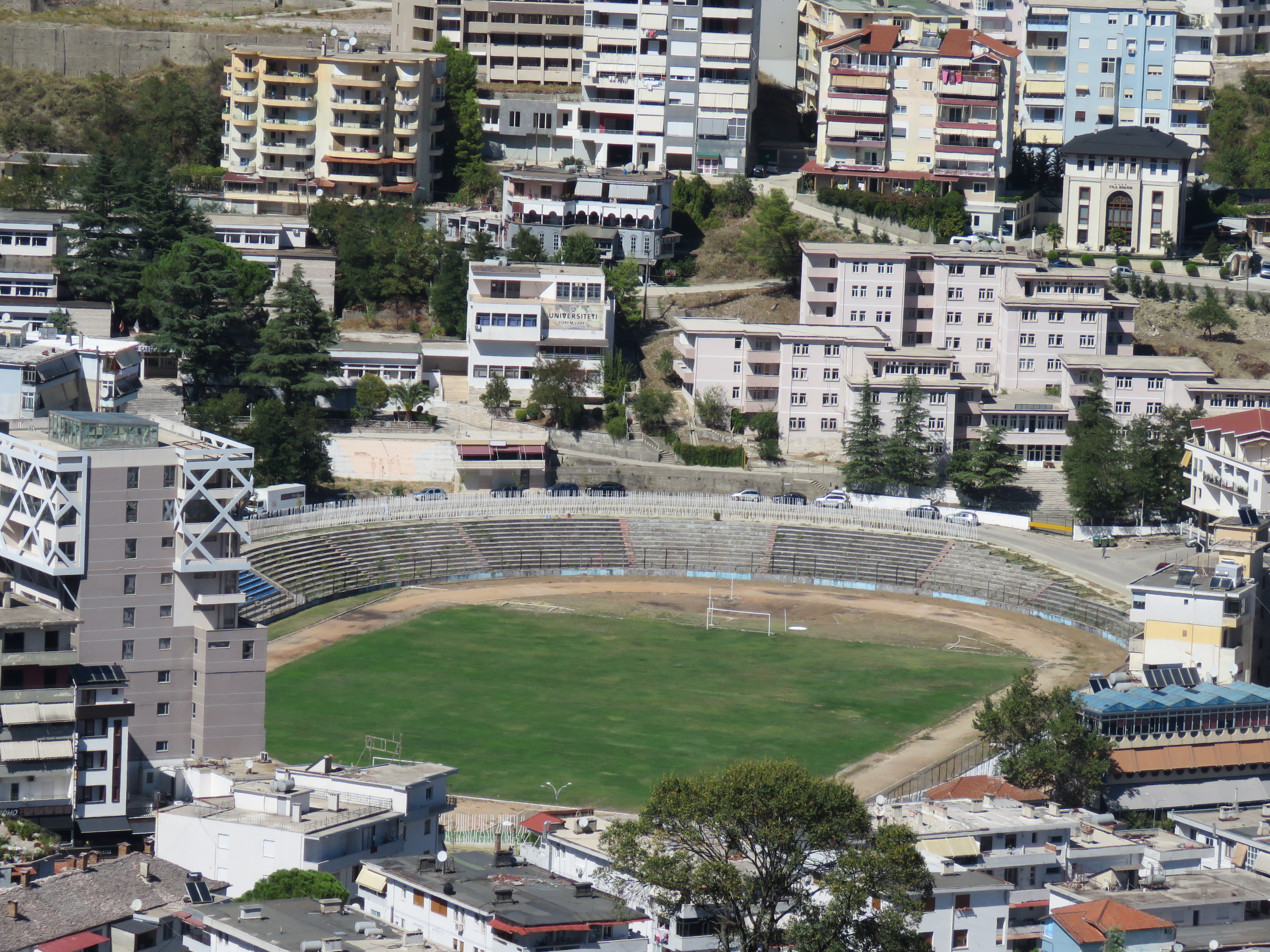
- Gjirokastra Stadium seen from Gjirokastër Castle in September 2022
- Interactive map of Gjirokastra Stadium
- Former names: Subi Bakiri Stadium
- Location: Gjirokastër, Albania
- Owner: Municipality of Gjirokastër
- Capacity: 8,400
- Surface: Natural grass

Construction
- Opened: 1972
- Renovated: 2016

Tenant
- Luftëtari

Gjirokastra Stadium (Albanian: Stadiumi Gjirokastra) is a multi-use stadium in Gjirokastër, Albania. It is used mostly for football matches and is the home ground of Luftëtari FC. The stadium has a capacity of 8,400 people. This is the first time after 1972 that the stadium is renovated in so big level.

== Renovation ==
Following Luftëtari's promotion back to the Albanian Superliga in 2016, the stadium required a complete renovation in order to meet the necessary requirements to host home games in the top flight. Work on the stadium began in August 2016 and the surface was to be replaced and plastic seats were to be installed throughout the stadium. The first stage of the reconstruction was completed in November 2016, which meant that the stadium was able to host Albanian Superliga games once again. The first stage consisted of replacing the playing surface, the installation of 300 plastic seats in the main stand, the installation of CCTV as well as the refurbishment of the changing room for both players and officials. The cost of the work carried out totalled 15,000,000 Albanian lek, around €110,000 at the time, and it was a joint investment by the Municipality of Gjirokastër, the Albanian Football Association as well as the club's owner Grigor Tavo. The first game of the 2016–17 season to take place at the stadium came against Partizani which ended 1–1 with around 3,000 fans in attendance.
