= KF Adriatiku Mamurras =

Albanian football club

Adriatiku
- Full name: Klubi i Futbolit Adriatiku Mamurras
- Founded: 1949; 77 years ago
- Dissolved: 2017
- Ground: Mamurras Stadium, Mamurras
- Capacity: 1,000
- 2017–18: Albanian Second Division, Group A, 10th (withdraw)

Klubi i Futbollit Adriatiku Mamurras was an Albanian football club based in the city of Mamurras. The club's home ground was the Mamurras Stadium and they competed in the Albanian Second Division on their last season.

== History ==
The club was founded in the late 1940s under the name Mamurrasi, which was changed to Vëllazerimi in 1991. The club was renamed to Adriatiku Mamurras in 2008. In 2016, the club was forced to relegate from the Kategoria e Parë.
