= 2016–17 Flamurtari FC season =

Flamurtari Vlorë
2016–17 season
- Chairman: Sinan Idrizi
- Manager: Gugash Magani (until 17 October 2016); Gentian Mezani (from 25 October 2016 to 16 February 2017); Shpëtim Duro (from 17 February 2017)
- Stadium: Flamurtari Stadium
- Kategoria Superiore: 8th
- Albanian Cup: Quarter-finals
- Top goalscorer: League: Tomislav Bušić (10); All: Tomislav Bušić (12)
Home colours	Away colours	Third colours

This article covers the 2016–17 season for Flamurtari Vlorë. They'll participate in the Kategoria Superiore and Albanian Cup.

== Squad ==
=== First team squad ===
Squad at end of season

Note: Flags indicate national team as defined under FIFA eligibility rules; some limited exceptions apply. Players may hold more than one non-FIFA nationality.

No.	Pos.	Nation	Player
1	GK	ALB	Argjent Halili
2	DF	ALB	Arbri Beqaj
3	DF	ALB	Ergis Mersini
4	DF	BRA	Mauricio Leal
5	DF	ALB	Ilir Berisha
6	MF	ALB	Alessio Hyseni
8	MF	ALB	Haxhi Neziraj
9	FW	ALB	Ardit Shehaj
10	MF	ALB	Donjet Shkodra
11	DF	ALB	Franc Veliu
12	GK	ALB	Stivi Frasheri
13	MF	MNE	Balša Radović

No.	Pos.	Nation	Player
14	DF	SRB	Ivan Jakovljević
17	MF	ALB	Bruno Telushi (captain)
20	MF	ALB	Taulant Kuqi
21	MF	ALB	Rigers Dushku
22	FW	CRO	Ivan Galić
23	DF	SRB	Miloš Rnić
24	DF	SRB	Nikola Đurić
25	FW	BRA	Lynneeker
30	FW	CRO	Tomislav Busic
89	GK	ALB	Pano Qirko
77	MF	ALB	Astrit Fazliu
99	FW	BRA	Danilo Almeida Alves

== Transfers ==
=== In ===
Date	Pos.	Name	From	Fee
1 July 2016	FW	(Kosovo) Astrit Fazliu	(Albania) Partizani Tirana	Undisclosed
1 July 2016	MF	(Montenegro) Balša Radović	(Montenegro) Lovćen	Undisclosed
1 July 2016	MF	(Japan) Masaki Iinuma	Free agent	Free
4 July 2016	MF	(Kosovo) Donjet Shkodra	(Belgium) Deinze	Undisclosed
4 July 2016	DF	(Serbia) Miloš Rnić	(Serbia) Metalac Gornji Milanovac	Undisclosed
5 July 2016	FW	(Croatia) Tomislav Bušić	Free agent	Free
7 July 2016	GK	(Albania) Ibrahim Bejte	(Albania) Besëlidhja Lezhë	Undisclosed
12 July 2016	MF	(Albania) Alessio Hyseni	(Italy) Perugia	Undisclosed
21 July 2016	DF	(Albania) Franc Veliu	(Albania) Partizani Tirana	Undisclosed
29 July 2016	DF	(Serbia) Nikola Đurić	(Serbia) Rad	Undisclosed
20 August 2016	FW	(Croatia) Ivan Galić	(North Macedonia) Rabotnički	Undisclosed
30 August 2016	GK	(Albania) Stivi Frashëri	(Albania) Bylis Ballsh	Undisclosed
8 January 2017	DF	(Serbia) Ivan Jakovljević	(Bosnia and Herzegovina) Radnik Bijeljina	Undisclosed
27 January 2017	DF	(Albania) Ergis Mersini	(Albania) Luftëtari Gjirokastër	Free
30 January 2017	MF	(Albania) Haxhi Neziraj	Free agent	Free
31 January 2017	FW	(Brazil) Lynneeker	Free agent	Free
31 January 2017	DF	(Brazil) Mauricio Leal	(Indonesia) Sriwijaya	Undisclosed

=== Out ===
Date	Pos.	Name	To	Fee
1 July 2016	MF	(Albania) Bedri Greca	(Albania) Kukësi	Free
1 July 2016	DF	(Kosovo) Debatik Curri	(Kosovo) Prishtina	Undisclosed
1 July 2016	DF	(Albania) Hektor Idrizaj	(Albania) Skënderbeu	Undisclosed
1 July 2016	MF	(Uruguay) Ignacio Nicolini	Released	Free
1 July 2016	MF	(Kosovo) Lorik Maxhuni	(Kosovo) Prishtina	Undisclosed
28 July 2016	MF	(Kosovo) Yll Hoxha	(Albania) Vllaznia Shkodër	Undisclosed
2 August 2016	DF	(Albania) Entonio Pashaj	(Albania) Kukësi	Undisclosed
2 August 2016	FW	(Brazil) João Henrique	(Brazil) Portuguesa	Free
5 December 2016	DF	(Serbia) Slavko Lukić	Released	Free
31 January 2017	DF	(Albania) Kristi Marku	(Albania) Partizani Tirana	Free

== Pre-season and friendlies ==
25 July 2016 Friendly	PAE Kerkyra (Greece)	4–0	(Albania) Flamurtari Vlorë	Corfu, Greece
19:00 CET	Thuram 7'; F. Georgiou 75'; K. Georgakopoulos 87'; P. Zorbas 90'	Report		Stadium: Kerkyra Stadium; Attendance: 500

30 July 2016 Friendly	Teuta Durrës (Albania)	1–1	(Albania) Flamurtari Vlorë	Durrës, Albania
16:00 CET	E. Musta	Report	D. Alves (pen.)	Stadium: Niko Dovana Stadium

12 August 2016 Friendly	Flamurtari Vlorë (Albania)	1–5	(Germany) Wolfsburg	Pinkafeld, Austria
16:00 CET	D. Alves 44'	Report	D. Didavi 12', 72'; B. Henrique 17'; B. Mayoral 50'; I. Azzaoui 83'

== Competitions ==
=== Kategoria Superiore ===
==== League table ====
Pos	Team	Pld	W	D	L	GF	GA	GD	Pts	Qualification or relegation
6	Laçi	36	10	10	16	23	35	−12	40	
7	Vllaznia	36	8	16	12	29	35	−6	40	
8	Flamurtari (Note: Flamurtari were deducted six points for failing to fulfill financial obligations.)	36	12	10	14	42	34	+8	40	
9	Tirana (R)	36	8	15	13	29	32	−3	39	Europa League qualifying and relegation to Kategoria e Parë (Note: Tirana qualified for the Europa League first qualifying round by winning the 2016–17 Albanian Cup.)
10	Korabi (R)	36	2	7	27	11	68	−57	13	Relegation to the 2017–18 Kategoria e Parë

Source: Albanian Football Association (in Albanian), Soccerway
Rules for classification: 1) Points; 2) Head-to-head points; 3) Head-to-head goal difference; 4) Head-to-head goals scored; 5) Goal difference; 6) Goals scored; 7) Draw.
(R) Relegated

==== Results summary ====
Overall								Home						Away					
Pld	W	D	L	GF	GA	GD	Pts	W	D	L	GF	GA	GD	W	D	L	GF	GA	GD
36	12	10	14	42	34	+8	46	9	6	3	29	9	+20	3	4	11	13	25	−12

Last updated: 27 May 2017.

==== Results by round ====
Round	1	2	3	4	5	6	7	8	9	10	11	12	13	14	15	16	17	18	19	20	21	22	23	24	25	26	27	28	29	30	31	32	33	34	35	36
Ground	A	H	A	H	A	H	A	A	H	H	A	H	A	H	A	H	H	A	A	H	A	H	A	H	A	A	H	H	A	H	A	H	A	H	H	A
Result	L	W	L	D	L	D	L	D	W	W	D	L	W	W	L	D	W	L	L	W	L	L	D	D	L	L	W	L	W	W	D	W	L	D	D	W
Position	10	10	10	10	8	8	8	8	5	6	6	6	6	6	6	7	7	6	6	6	6	6	6	6	6	6	6	6	6	6	5	6	8	8	8	8

Source: Soccerway
A = Away; H = Home; W = Win; D = Draw; L = Loss

==== Matches ====
Win Draw Loss

7 September 2016 1	Skënderbeu Korçë	2–1	Flamurtari Vlorë	Korçë
19:00 CET	Salihi 25', 84' (pen.)	Report	Dushku (yellow card) 17'; Shkodra 42'; Radović (yellow card) 54'; Galić (yellow card) 74'; Lukić (yellow card) 82'	Stadium: Skënderbeu Stadium; Attendance: 3,000; Referee: Laver Alla

11 September 2016 2	Flamurtari Vlorë	5–0	Luftëtari Gjirokastër	Vlorë
19:00 CET	Shkodra 3', 64'; Bušić 9'; Galić 34' (yellow card) 60'; Telushi (yellow card) 52'; Shehaj 72'	Report	B. Ramadani (yellow card) 8'; Rapa (yellow card) 45+2'	Stadium: Flamurtari Stadium; Attendance: 2,000; Referee: Adrian Beqiri

18 September 2016 3	Vllaznia Shkodër	2–0	Flamurtari Vlorë	Shkodër
13:00 CET	Tafili 24' (pen.); Bardulla (yellow card) 34'; Bicaj (yellow card) 68'; Hebaj (yellow card) 68' (goal) 72'; Vecaj (yellow card) 72'; Vrapi (yellow card) 90+1'	Report	Shkodra (yellow card) 24'; Rnić (yellow card) 34'	Stadium: Loro Boriçi Stadium; Attendance: 2,000; Referee: Enea Jorgji

24 September 2016 4	Flamurtari Vlorë	0–0	Teuta Durrës	Vlorë
17:00 CET	Bušić (yellow card) 20'; Shehaj (yellow card) 50'; Veliu (red card) 90+2'	Report	Hila (yellow card) 6'; Çyrbja (yellow card) 71'; Kotobelli (yellow card) 85'	Stadium: Flamurtari Stadium; Attendance: 1,000; Referee: Eldorjan Hamiti

2 October 2016 5	Tirana	3–0	Flamurtari Vlorë	Tirana
17:00 CET	Edeh 35'; Taku 39', 90+4'	Report	Marku (yellow card) 85'	Stadium: Selman Stërmasi Stadium; Attendance: 2,500; Referee: Emirjon Sino

12 October 2016 6	Flamurtari Vlorë	1–1	Kukesi	Vlorë
17:00 CET	Berisha 19'; Kuqi (yellow card) 22'; Veliu (yellow card) 44'	Report	Pashaj (yellow card) 26' (yellow-red card) 30'; Pejić 60'; Alla (yellow card) 79'; Rangel (yellow card) 90+2'	Stadium: Flamurtari Stadium; Attendance: 1,500; Referee: Eldorjan Hamiti

17 October 2016 7	Partizani Tirana	4–0	Flamurtari Vlorë	Elbasan
17:00 CET	Ekuban 24'; Trashi 31'; Batha (yellow card) 42'; Vila 86'; Bardhi 89'	Report		Stadium: Elbasan Arena; Attendance: 400; Referee: Juxhin Xhaja

22 October 2016 8	Laçi	1–1	Flamurtari Vlorë	Laç
14:00 CET	Shala (yellow card) 53'; Lulaj 87'; Musaj (yellow card) 90+1'	Report	Zeqiri (yellow card) 12'; Radović 29'; Beqaj (yellow card) 57'	Stadium: Laçi Stadium; Attendance: 400; Referee: Adrian Beqiri

30 October 2016 9	Flamurtari Vlorë	4–1	Korabi Peshkopi	Vlorë
14:00 CET	Shkodra 30' (yellow card) 49'; Bušić (yellow card) 30' (goal) 76'; Telushi 42' (pen.); Radović (yellow card) 60'; Fazliu 86'	Report	Plaku 22'; Zefi (yellow card) 40'; Nako (yellow card) 59'; Kaja (yellow card) 79'	Stadium: Flamurtari Stadium; Attendance: 1,000; Referee: Andi Koçi

5 November 2016 10	Flamurtari Vlorë	2–0	Skënderbeu Korçë	Vlorë
17:00 CET	Shkodra 9'; Bušić 37'; Radović (yellow card) 43'	Report	Serginho (yellow card) 90+1'	Stadium: Flamurtari Stadium; Attendance: 1,531; Referee: Lorenc Jemini

20 November 2016 11	Luftëtari Gjirokastër	1–1	Flamurtari Vlorë	Gjirokastër
14:00 CET	Aleksi (yellow card) 43'; Reginaldo 50' (yellow card) 54'; Faye (yellow card) 90'	Report	Dushku (yellow card) 43'; Galić 82'; Zeqiri (yellow card) 84'; Marku (yellow card) 90+2'	Stadium: Gjirokastra Stadium; Attendance: 2,500; Referee: Adrian Beqiri

25 November 2016 12	Flamurtari Vlorë	0–1	Vllaznia Shkodër	Vlorë
18:00 CET	Shehaj (yellow card) 51'; Rnić (yellow card) 53'; Zeqiri (yellow card) 63'; Telushi (yellow card) 90+4'	Report	Krymi (yellow card) 25'; Cicmil 37'; Bardulla (yellow card) 41'	Stadium: Flamurtari Stadium; Attendance: 500; Referee: Enea Jorgji

30 November 2016 13	Teuta Durrës	1–2	Flamurtari Vlorë	Durrës
17:00 CET	Ribaj 39'; Çyrbja (yellow card) 80'; Hila (yellow card) 81'	Report	Beqaj (yellow card) 54'; Galić 70'; Telushi (yellow card) 73'; Moçka 81' (o.g.)	Stadium: Niko Dovana Stadium; Attendance: 500; Referee: Eldorjan Hamiti

6 December 2016 14	Flamurtari Vlorë	1–0	Tirana	Vlorë
17:00 CET	Shkodra 42'; Veliu (yellow card) 47'; Danilo Alves (yellow card) 73'	Report	Vucaj (red card) 73'	Stadium: Flamurtari Stadium; Attendance: 2,500; Referee: Remzi Sadiku

10 December 2016 15	Kukesi	1–0	Flamurtari Vlorë	Kukës
14:00 CET	Emini 23'; Lena (yellow card) 89'	Report	Telushi (yellow card) 24'; Danilo Alves (yellow card) 30'; Marku (yellow card) 61'	Stadium: Zeqir Ymeri Stadium; Attendance: 300; Referee: Olsi Sokoli

14 December 2016 16	Flamurtari Vlorë	1–1	Partizani Tirana	Vlorë
17:00 CET	Danilo Alves 65'; Frashëri (yellow card) 72'; Telushi (yellow card) 90+3'	Report	Batha 13'; Trashi (yellow card) 76'; Y. Ramadani (yellow card) 87'	Stadium: Flamurtari Stadium; Attendance: 2,500; Referee: Andi Koçi

18 December 2016 17	Flamurtari Vlorë	1–0	Laçi	Vlorë
17:00 CET	Shehaj 56'; Beqaj (yellow card) 62'	Report	Fangaj (yellow card) 2'; Lushkja (yellow card) 30'; Kastrati (yellow card) 51'; Lipi (yellow card) 61'	Stadium: Flamurtari Stadium; Attendance: 450; Referee: Kridens Meta

22 December 2016 18	Korabi Peshkopi	1–0	Flamurtari Vlorë	Peqin
14:00 CET	Mziu (yellow card) 40'; Plaku 66'; Sheta (yellow card) 88' (yellow-red card) 89'	Report	Danilo Alves (yellow card) 65'	Stadium: Shkumbini Stadium; Attendance: 65; Referee: Olsi Sokoli

28 January 2017 19	Skënderbeu Korçë	1–0	Flamurtari Vlorë	Korçë
14:00 CET	Jashanica 86'; Latifi (yellow card) 88'	Report	Telushi (yellow card) 88'	Stadium: Skënderbeu Stadium; Attendance: 2,500; Referee: Adrian Beqiri

6 February 2017 20	Flamurtari Vlorë	2–1	Luftëtari Gjirokastër	Vlorë
17:00 CET	Veliu 25'; Jakovljević (yellow card) 35'; Bušić 45'	Report	Liçaj (yellow card) 13'; Beqiri (yellow card) 43'; Rroca 63'; Zguro (yellow card) 72'; Boyom (yellow card) 78'; Abazaj (yellow card) 85'	Stadium: Flamurtari Stadium; Attendance: 1,000; Referee: Eldorjan Hamiti

11 February 2017 21	Vllaznia Shkodër	3–2	Flamurtari Vlorë	Shkodër
14:00 CET	Gocaj (yellow card) 73'; Hebaj 75'; Bakaj 78'; Pjeshka 90+3'	Report	Bušić 17', 90+2'; Danilo Alves (yellow card) 37'; Hyseni (yellow card) 73'	Stadium: Loro Boriçi Stadium; Attendance: 1,500; Referee: Kridens Meta

19 February 2017 22	Flamurtari Vlorë	0–1	Teuta Durrës	Vlorë
17:00 CET		Report	Dita (yellow card) 25'; Progni (yellow card) 49'; Čmajčanin 90+3'	Stadium: Flamurtari Stadium; Attendance: 2,031; Referee: Lorenc Jemini

26 February 2017 23	Tirana	0–0	Flamurtari Vlorë	Tirana
17:00 CET		Report	Hyseni (yellow card) 36'	Stadium: Selman Stërmasi Stadium; Attendance: 350; Referee: Glen Tonna (Malta)

5 March 2017 24	Flamurtari Vlorë	1–1	Kukesi	Vlorë
14:00 CET	Danilo Alves 39'; Bušić (yellow card) 77'; Jakovljević (red card) 82'	Report	Hallaçi (yellow card) 45'; Lena (yellow card) 53' (yellow-red card) 67'; Guri 58'; Pejić (yellow card) 73'; Lushtaku (yellow card) 83'	Stadium: Flamurtari Stadium; Attendance: 6,000; Referee: Enea Jorgji

11 March 2017 25	Partizani Tirana	2–1	Flamurtari Vlorë	Elbasan
14:00 CET	Mazrekaj 5'; Trashi 11' (pen.); Ćetković (yellow card) 48'; Atanda (yellow card) 89'	Report	Danilo Alves 70'	Stadium: Elbasan Arena; Attendance: 0 Referee: Andi Koçi

18 March 2017 26	Laçi	1–0	Flamurtari Vlorë	Laç
14:00 CET	Lushkja (yellow card) 28'; Sefgjinaj (yellow card) 28'; Nika 58' (yellow card) 90+3'; Musaj (yellow card) 83'	Report	Galić (yellow card) 20'; Veliu (yellow card) 33'	Stadium: Laçi Stadium; Attendance: 2,500; Referee: Enea Jorgji

1 April 2017 27	Flamurtari Vlorë	6–0	Korabi Peshkopi	Vlorë
19:00 CET	Shkodra 19'; Telushi 30' (pen.); Danilo Alves (yellow card) 35'; Bušić 53', 61'; Neziraj 58'; Peposhi 70' (o.g.); Lynneeker (yellow card) 78'	Report	Peposhi (yellow card) 19'; Laço (yellow card) 29'; Jubani (yellow card) 66'; Kaloshi (red card) 78'	Stadium: Flamurtari Stadium; Attendance: 1,500; Referee: Adrian Beqiri

10 April 2017 28	Flamurtari Vlorë	0–1	Skënderbeu Korçë	Vlorë
19:00 CET	Neziraj (yellow card) 42'; Fazliu (yellow card) 45+1'; Telushi (yellow card) 55'; Mauricio Leal (yellow card) 67'	Report	Latifi 48'; Mici (yellow card) 74'; Osmani (yellow card) 90+4'	Stadium: Flamurtari Stadium; Attendance: 6,000; Referee: Eldorjan Hamiti

16 April 2017 29	Luftëtari Gjirokastër	1–2	Flamurtari Vlorë	Gjirokastër
16:00 CET	Bregu 10'; Aleksi (yellow card) 26'; Beqiri (yellow card) 50'; Rapo (yellow card) 57'	Report	Telushi (yellow card) 26' (goal) 89' (pen.); Shkodra (yellow card) 44' (goal) 70'; Neziraj (yellow card) 84'	Stadium: Gjirokastra Stadium; Attendance: 3,000; Referee: Enea Jorgji

22 April 2017 30	Flamurtari Vlorë	2–0	Vllaznia Shkodër	Vlorë
19:00 CET	Bušić 7'; Danilo Alves 61'	Report	Bakaj (yellow card) 44'; Gurishta (yellow card) 60'	Stadium: Flamurtari Stadium; Attendance: 0 Referee: Sven Bindels (Luxembourg)

30 April 2017 31	Teuta Durrës	0–0	Flamurtari Vlorë	Durrës
19:00 CET	Progni (yellow card) 26'	Report	Telushi (yellow card) 45'; Shkodra (yellow card) 50'	Stadium: Niko Dovana Stadium; Attendance: 250; Referee: Blerim Ziri

6 May 2017 32	Flamurtari Vlorë	2–0	Tirana	Vlorë
19:00 CET	Veliu (yellow card) 33'; Shkodra (yellow card) 67' (goal) 89'; Bušić 90+1'	Report	Cake (yellow card) 45'; Edeh (yellow card) 61'; Karabeci (yellow card) 88'	Stadium: Flamurtari Stadium; Attendance: 4,000; Referee: Enea Jorgji

10 May 2017 33	Kukesi	1–0	Flamurtari Vlorë	Kukës
16:00 CET	Pejić 33'; Jean Carioca (yellow card) 90'; Rangel (yellow card) 90+3'	Report	Mersini (yellow card) 26'; Veliu (yellow card) 32'; Fazliu (yellow card) 79'; Telushi (yellow card) 90'; Mauricio Leal (yellow card) 90+3'	Stadium: Zeqir Ymeri Stadium; Attendance: 1,000; Referee: Eldorjan Hamiti

15 May 2017 34	Flamurtari Vlorë	1–1	Partizani Tirana	Vlorë
19:00 CEST	Telushi 49' (pen.) (yellow card) 61'; Danilo Alves (yellow card) 66'	Report	Ekuban 33'; Trashi (yellow card) 39'; Malota (yellow card) 48'; Y. Ramadani (yellow card) 77'	Stadium: Flamurtari Stadium; Attendance: 3,500; Referee: Blerim Ziri

20 May 2017 35	Flamurtari Vlorë	0–0	Laçi	Vlorë
17:30 CET	Telushi (yellow card) 45'; Jakovljević (red card) 87'	Report	Nika (yellow card) 45'; Sefgjinaj (yellow card) 45+1'; Lulaj (red card) 87'; Selmani (yellow card) 88'	Stadium: Flamurtari Stadium; Attendance: 3,000; Referee: Juxhin Xhaja

27 May 2017 36	Korabi Peshkopi	0–3	Flamurtari Vlorë	Tirana
17:00 CET	Prençi (yellow card) 50'; Kaloshi (yellow card) 84'	Report	Shehaj (yellow card) 24'; Danilo Alves 43' (pen.); Veliu 64'; Lynneeker 88'	Stadium: Selman Stërmasi Stadium; Attendance: 100; Referee: Remzi Sadiku

=== Albanian Cup ===
==== First round ====
28 September 2016 First leg	Iliria Fushë-Krujë	1–0	Flamurtari Vlorë	Fushë-Krujë
16:00 CET	Thaçi (yellow card) 60'; Zira 88'	Report	Marku (yellow card) 43'	Stadium: Redi Maloku Stadium; Attendance: 200; Referee: Xhulio Mema

5 October 2016 Second leg	Flamurtari Vlorë	6–0 (6–1 agg.)	Iliria Fushë-Krujë	Vlorë
14:00 CET	Bušić 20'; Veliu 24'; Shkodra 28'; Telushi 60' (pen.), 62'; Idrizaj 70'	Report	Zuna (yellow card) 53'	Stadium: Flamurtari Stadium; Attendance: 100; Referee: Olsid Ferataj

==== Second round ====
26 October 2016 First leg	Tërbuni Pukë	3–3	Flamurtari Vlorë	Pukë
14:00 CET	Puka 35', 80'; Kiri 67' (pen.) (yellow card) 90'; Arthur (yellow card) 69'	Report	Shkodra 45+1'; Hoxhaj (yellow card) 69'; Telushi 74'; Bušić 90'	Stadium: Ismail Xhemali Stadium; Attendance: 100; Referee: Alvi Paço

16 November 2016 Second leg	Flamurtari Vlorë	2–0 (5–3 agg.)	Tërbuni Pukë	Vlorë
13:30 CET	Radović 17'; Dushku 28'	Report	Kule (yellow card) 65'	Stadium: Flamurtari Stadium; Attendance: 600; Referee: Elidon Halo

==== Quarter-finals ====
1 February 2017 First leg	Flamurtari Vlorë	1–2	Besëlidhja Lezhë	Vlorë
17:00 CET	Kuqi (yellow card) 54'; Smajli 74' (o.g.)	Report	Camara 19'; Marashi 47'	Stadium: Flamurtari Stadium; Attendance: 500; Referee: Kreshnik Cjapi

15 February 2017 Second leg	Besëlidhja Lezhë	0–0 (2–1 agg.)	Flamurtari Vlorë	Lezhë
13:30 CET	Semina (yellow card) 10'	Report	Leal (yellow card) 28'; Mersini (yellow card) 75'; Dushku (yellow card) 79'; Alves (yellow card) 83'	Stadium: Brian Filipi Stadium; Attendance: 1,031; Referee: Lorenc Jemini
