= 2017–18 FK Partizani Tirana season =

Partizani Tirana
2017–18 season
- President: Gazmend Demi
- Head coach: Mark Iuliano (until 5 November 2017); Sulejman Starova (from 5 November 2017 to 1 March 2018); Klevis Dalipi (from 3 March 2018)
- Stadium: Selman Stërmasi Stadium
- Kategoria Superiore: 5th
- Albanian Cup: Quarter-finals
- Europa League: First qualifying round
- Top goalscorer: League: Gerhard Progni (8); All: Gerhard Progni (9)
- Highest home attendance: 4,500 vs Kukësi (18 September 2017)
- Lowest home attendance: 50 vs Naftëtari Kuçovë (27 September 2017)
Home colours	Away colours

In the 2017–18 season, Partizani Tirana competed in the Kategoria Superiore for the fifth consecutive season. The season was the worst since 2014, because Partizani finished in fifth place, after a disastrous beginning and a bad form during the big part of the season. The club qualified for Europe next season, because of another ban of Skënderbeu from European competitions, this time for 10 years.

== First-team squad ==
Squad at end of season

Note: Flags indicate national team as defined under FIFA eligibility rules; some limited exceptions apply. Players may hold more than one non-FIFA nationality.

No.	Pos.	Nation	Player
1	GK	ALB	Dashamir Xhika
2	DF	MKD	Egzon Belica
5	DF	BIH	Renato Gojković
7	MF	ALB	Gerhard Progni
8	FW	MKD	Emran Ramadani
9	FW	ALB	Edgar Çani
10	MF	ALB	Idriz Batha (captain)
11	MF	ALB	Jurgen Bardhi
12	GK	ALB	Alban Hoxha
14	FW	ALB	Ardit Jaupaj
15	DF	ALB	Blerim Kotobelli
16	MF	ALB	Jasir Asani

No.	Pos.	Nation	Player
17	MF	ALB	Bruno Telushi
18	FW	BRA	Lucas Cardoso
19	MF	ALB	Lorenc Trashi
20	MF	SRB	Milan Ćulum
22	DF	KOS	Labinot Ibrahimi (vice-captain)
28	DF	KOS	Esat Mala
30	FW	MKD	Alban Sulejmani
31	DF	ALB	Arbnor Fejzullahu
36	DF	NGR	Sodiq Atanda
90	FW	MKD	Besart Abdurahimi
—	DF	ALB	Senad Hysenaj

=== Left club during season ===
Note: Flags indicate national team as defined under FIFA eligibility rules; some limited exceptions apply. Players may hold more than one non-FIFA nationality.

No.	Pos.	Nation	Player
5	DF	ALB	Gëzim Krasniqi (to Rabotnički)
6	MF	HUN	Krisztián Adorján (return from loan to Novara)
7	FW	ALB	Realdo Fili (to Kamza)
8	MF	ITA	Giovanni La Camera (to Reggina)
13	DF	ALB	Renato Malota (to Vllaznia)
14	MF	KOS	Mentor Mazrekaj (to Prishtina)

No.	Pos.	Nation	Player
14	MF	PAN	Eric Herrera (released)
17	MF	ALB	Romeo Shahinas (released)
20	FW	ALB	Xhevahir Sukaj (to Vllaznia)
21	DF	SUI	Milan Basrak (to Napredak)
88	MF	ALB	Emiljano Vila (to Skënderbeu)
—	FW	CMR	Moustapha Djidjiwa (to Erzeni)

== Competitions ==
=== Kategoria Superiore ===
==== League table ====
Pos	Team	Pld	W	D	L	GF	GA	GD	Pts	Qualification or relegation
3	Luftëtari	36	16	11	9	47	37	+10	59	Qualification to the Europa League first qualifying round (Note: Skënderbeu qualified for the Europa League first qualifying round by winning the 2017–18 Albanian Cup. However, since they were banned from entering UEFA competitions, the spot awarded to the cup winners was passed down the league.)
4	Laçi	36	16	8	12	45	39	+6	56	Qualification to the Europa League first qualifying round
5	Partizani	36	15	8	13	41	36	+5	53	Qualification to the Europa League first qualifying round
6	Flamurtari	36	11	13	12	37	37	0	46	
7	Kamza	36	12	10	14	37	41	−4	46	

Source: Albanian Football Association (in Albanian), Soccerway
Rules for classification: 1) Points; 2) Head-to-head points; 3) Head-to-head goal difference; 4) Head-to-head goals scored; 5) Goal difference; 6) Goals scored; 7) Draw.

==== Results summary ====
Overall								Home						Away					
Pld	W	D	L	GF	GA	GD	Pts	W	D	L	GF	GA	GD	W	D	L	GF	GA	GD
36	15	8	13	41	36	+5	53	8	4	6	23	14	+9	7	4	7	18	22	−4

Source: Competitive matches

==== Results by matchday ====
Round	1	2	3	4	5	6	7	8	9	10	11	12	13	14	15	16	17	18	19	20	21	22	23	24	25	26	27	28	29	30	31	32	33	34	35	36
Ground	H	H	A	H	A	H	A	H	A	A	A	H	A	H	A	H	A	H	H	H	A	H	A	H	A	H	A	A	A	H	A	H	A	H	A	H
Result	L	D	L	D	W	W	W	L	L	L	W	D	W	W	L	W	L	W	D	L	L	W	D	W	D	W	W	W	L	L	D	L	D	W	W	L
Position	8	9	10	10	9	5	4	5	6	6	6	6	6	6	6	5	6	5	6	6	7	7	6	5	6	4	3	3	3	4	4	4	4	4	4	5

Source: Competitive matches
A = Away; H = Home; W = Win; D = Draw; L = Loss

==== Matches ====
10 September 2017 1	Partizani	0–2	Laçi	Tirana
19:00 CEST	Atanda (yellow card) 53'; La Camera (yellow card) 66'	Report	K. Bardhi (yellow card) 29'; Kallaku 59'; Ademir (yellow card) 64' (yellow-red card) 90'; Maicon 69'; Selmani (yellow card) 90+2'	Stadium: Selman Stërmasi Stadium; Attendance: 1,800; Referee: Laver Alla

18 September 2017 2	Partizani	0–0	Kukësi	Tirana
19:00 CEST	Adorján (yellow card) 66'; La Camera (yellow card) 73'	Report	E. Bakaj (yellow card) 72'	Stadium: Selman Stërmasi Stadium; Attendance: 4,500; Referee: Juxhin Xhaja

23 September 2017 3	Skënderbeu	2–0	Partizani	Korçë
19:00 CEST	Sowe 65'; Lilaj 86' (pen.)	Report	Batha (yellow card) 55'; La Camera (yellow card) 58'	Stadium: Skënderbeu Stadium; Attendance: 4,200; Referee: Remzi Sadiku

2 October 2017 4	Partizani	0–0	Lushnja	Tirana
17:00 CEST	Progni (yellow card) 90+3'	Report	Canka (yellow card) 79'	Stadium: Selman Stërmasi Stadium; Attendance: 800; Referee: Ardian Beqiri

12 October 2017 5	Teuta	1–2	Partizani	Durrës
17:00 CEST	Hila (yellow card) 16'; Dosti 17'; Moçka (yellow card) 28'; Shehaj (red card) 78'; Lena (yellow card) 80'; Dedić (red card) 87'	Report	Batha (yellow card) 6'; Progni (yellow card) 39'; Trashi 44'; La Camera (yellow card) 60'; Vila (yellow card) 77'; Sukaj 80' (pen.)	Stadium: Niko Dovana Stadium; Attendance: 100; Referee: Remzi Sadiku

16 October 2017 6	Partizani	1–0	Luftëtari	Tirana
17:00 CEST	Sukaj 28'; Malota (yellow card) 68'; Trashi 71'; Krasniqi (red card) 79'; Kalari (yellow card) 87'	Report		Stadium: Selman Stërmasi Stadium; Attendance: 1,000; Referee: Enea Jorgji

22 October 2017 7	Vllaznia	0–1	Partizani	Shkodër
14:00 CEST		Report	Basrak 4'; Adorján (yellow card) 32'; Progni (yellow card) 82'	Stadium: Loro Boriçi Stadium; Attendance: 2,000; Referee: Eldorjan Hamiti

29 October 2017 8	Partizani	0–1	Flamurtari	Tirana
17:00 CET	Ibrahimi (yellow card) 36'; Progni (yellow card) 47'	Report	Hoxhaj 25' (yellow card) 26'; Camara (yellow card) 76'; Sidibe (yellow card) 89'	Stadium: Selman Stërmasi Stadium; Attendance: 2,000; Referee: Kridens Meta

4 November 2017 9	Kamza	1–0	Partizani	Kamëz
14:00 CET	Kuqi (yellow card) 73'; Idrizaj (yellow card) 74'; Račić (yellow card) 75'; Ymeraj 85'	Report	La Camera (yellow card) 9'; Batha (yellow card) 59'; Trashi (yellow card) 71'; Asani (yellow card) 83'	Stadium: Kamëz Stadium; Attendance: 1,500; Referee: Juxhin Xhaja

16 November 2017 10	Laçi	1–0	Partizani	Laç
14:00 CET	Reginaldo (yellow card) 19' (goal) 46'; Shala (yellow card) 32'; Jonuzi (yellow card) 49'; Nika (yellow card) 90+2'	Report	Batha (yellow card) 49'; Kalari (yellow card) 73'; Atanda (yellow card) 82'; J. Bardhi (yellow card) 87'	Stadium: Laçi Stadium; Attendance: 400; Referee: Klajdi Kola

20 November 2017 11	Kukësi	1–2	Partizani	Kukës
14:00 CET	Guri 8' (pen.); Alla (yellow card) 65'; Shameti (yellow card) 81'	Report	Malota (yellow card) 8'; J. Bardhi 21' (yellow card) 56'; Progni 44'	Stadium: Zeqir Ymeri Stadium; Attendance: 1,000; Referee: Andi Koçi

27 November 2017 12	Partizani	0–0	Skënderbeu	Tirana
17:00 CET	Trashi (yellow card) 57'	Report	Osmani (yellow card) 50'	Stadium: Selman Stërmasi Stadium; Attendance: 3,000; Referee: Eldorjan Hamiti

3 December 2017 13	Lushnja	0–3	Partizani	Lushnjë
13:00 CET	Alushi (yellow card) 49'; Taullau (yellow card) 83'	Report	Batha 60'; Progni 73'; Trashi 84'	Stadium: Abdurrahman Roza Haxhiu Stadium; Attendance: 300; Referee: Remzi Sadiku

10 December 2017 14	Partizani	2–1	Teuta	Tirana
17:00 CET	Trashi 23'; Progni (yellow card) 24'; Kalari (yellow card) 53'; Djidjiwa (yellow card) 83'; Atanda (yellow card) 90'; Batha 90+4'	Report	Čmajčanin 19'; Bilali (yellow card) 24'	Stadium: Selman Stërmasi Stadium; Attendance: 2,000; Referee: Enea Jorgji

17 December 2017 15	Luftëtari	5–0	Partizani	Gjirokastër
13:00 CET	Bregu 21'; Abazaj 36'; Rroca 38'; Lamçja 59', 80'; Zguro (yellow card) 52'	Report	Ibrahimi (yellow card) 66'	Stadium: Gjirokastra Stadium; Attendance: 1,000; Referee: Kridens Meta

22 December 2017 16	Partizani	3–1	Vllaznia	Tirana
13:00 CET	Kalari (yellow card) 6'; Ibrahimi 9'; Trashi (yellow card) 56'; Progni 66'; J. Bardhi 83'	Report	Çinari 11' (yellow card) 53'; Lika (yellow card) 69'; Vucaj (yellow card) 79'	Stadium: Selman Stërmasi Stadium; Attendance: 300; Referee: Eldorjan Hamiti

26 January 2018 17	Flamurtari	1–0	Partizani	Vlorë
17:00 CET	Siljanovski (yellow card) 14'; Useini (yellow card) 42'; Sidibe (yellow card) 77'; Bicaj (yellow card) 90+1'; Bušić 90+5'	Report	Progni (yellow card) 14'; Telushi (yellow card) 86'	Stadium: Flamurtari Stadium; Attendance: 6,000; Referee: Enea Jorgji

4 February 2018 18	Partizani	2–1	Kamza	Tirana
14:00 CET	Asani 7', 23'; Progni (yellow card) 75'	Report	Plaku 26'; Fili (yellow card) 63'; Arrabal (yellow card) 88'	Stadium: Selman Stërmasi Stadium; Attendance: 700; Referee: Andi Koçi

10 February 2018 19	Partizani	0–0	Laçi	Tirana
17:00 CET	Progni (yellow card) 40'; Belica (yellow card) 43'; J. Bardhi (yellow card) 86'	Report	Sefgjinaj (yellow card) 39'; Reginaldo (yellow card) 43'; Uzuni (yellow card) 70'; Nika (yellow card) 81'	Stadium: Selman Stërmasi Stadium; Attendance: 600; Referee: Ardian Beqiri

19 February 2018 20	Partizani	1–3	Kukësi	Tirana
18:00 CET	Kotobelli (yellow card) 28'; Ćulum (yellow card) 32' (yellow-red card) 65'; Gojković 42'; Ibrahimi (yellow card) 84'	Report	Rrumbullaku (yellow card) 53'; Guri 66', 90+5'; Hoxha 70'; E. Bakaj (yellow card) 75' (yellow-red card) 90+4'; Imami (yellow card) 86'	Stadium: Selman Stërmasi Stadium; Attendance: 1,000; Referee: Kridens Meta

24 February 2018 21	Skënderbeu	1–0	Partizani	Korçë
17:00 CET	Mici (yellow card) 50'; Gojković 62' (o.g.); Radaš (yellow card) 85'	Report	Progni (yellow card) 45'	Stadium: Skënderbeu Stadium; Attendance: 7,000; Referee: Andi Koçi

28 February 2018 22	Partizani	6–0	Lushnja	Tirana
17:00 CET	J. Bardhi 28', 34'; Belica 45+2'; Progni 57'; Lucas Cardoso 62'; Ramadani 84'	Report	Prençi (yellow card) 43'	Stadium: Selman Stërmasi Stadium; Attendance: 600; Referee: Orlando Kuka

4 March 2018 23	Teuta	1–1	Partizani	Durrës
17:00 CET	Shkalla (yellow card) 55'; Hakaj (yellow card) 90+3'; Moçka 90+6'	Report	Belica (yellow card) 17'; Progni 22' (yellow card) 90+3'; Gojković (yellow card) 55'	Stadium: Niko Dovana Stadium; Attendance: 800; Referee: Eldorjan Hamiti

10 March 2018 24	Partizani	3–0	Luftëtari	Tirana
17:00 CET	Trashi 31'; Belica (yellow card) 33'; Batha (yellow card) 70' (goal) 84' (pen.); Beqiri 71' (o.g.); Mala (yellow card) 75'	Report	Rroca (yellow card) 47'	Stadium: Selman Stërmasi Stadium; Attendance: 2,000; Referee: Andi Koçi

14 March 2018 25	Vllaznia	0–0	Partizani	Shkodër
14:00 CET		Report		Stadium: Loro Boriçi Stadium; Attendance: 1,500; Referee: Klajdi Kola

19 March 2018 26	Partizani	1–0	Flamurtari	Tirana
17:00 CET	Çani 55'; Ćulum (yellow card) 82'	Report	Musta (yellow card) 10'; Veliu (yellow card) 17'; Hoxhaj (yellow card) 26'; Zuka (yellow card) 76'; Sidibe (yellow card) 81'	Stadium: Selman Stërmasi Stadium; Attendance: 1,000; Referee: Andi Koçi

1 April 2018 27	Kamza	0–1	Partizani	Kamëz
14:00 CEST	Kuqi (yellow card) 31'; Fukui (yellow card) 80'	Report	Trashi (yellow card) 27'; Kotobelli (yellow card) 38'; Lucas Cardoso 86'	Stadium: Kamëz Stadium; Attendance: 1,000; Referee: Klajdi Kola

8 April 2018 28	Laçi	0–3	Partizani	Laç
14:00 CEST	Sefgjinaj (yellow card) 30'; Uzuni (yellow card) 38'	Report	Ibrahimi (yellow card) 34'; Lucas Cardoso 50'; Abdurahimi 85'; Progni 88'	Stadium: Laçi Stadium; Attendance: 800; Referee: Enea Jorgji

14 April 2018 29	Kukësi	4–0	Partizani	Kukës
16:00 CEST	Guri 8', 40', 79'; Dzaria 65'; Shameti (yellow card) 90'	Report	Progni (yellow card) 16'; Batha (yellow card) 61'	Stadium: Zeqir Ymeri Stadium; Attendance: 2,500; Referee: Klajdi Kola

23 April 2018 30	Partizani	0–1	Skënderbeu	Tirana
19:00 CEST	Batha (yellow card) 15'; Telushi (yellow card) 61'; Progni (yellow card) 90+1'; Ibrahimi (yellow card) 90+4'	Report	Nimaga (yellow card) 15'; Osmani (yellow card) 81'; Dita 90+5'	Stadium: Selman Stërmasi Stadium; Attendance: 4,000; Referee: Andi Koçi

28 April 2018 31	Lushnja	1–1	Partizani	Lushnjë
16:00 CEST	Magani (yellow card) 54'; Pepa 69' (pen.); Alushi (yellow card) 83'	Report	Mala (yellow card) 68'; Batha 89'	Stadium: Abdurrahman Roza Haxhiu Stadium; Attendance: 100; Referee: Blerim Ziri

5 May 2018 32	Partizani	1–3	Teuta	Tirana
19:00 CEST	Batha 16' (pen.)	Report	Gjorgievski (yellow card) 30'; Çyrbja 42'; Hrkać 64'; Beqja (yellow card) 65'; Hila 74'	Stadium: Selman Stërmasi Stadium; Attendance: 0 (Note: The match was played behind the doors closed.); Referee: Juxhin Xhaja

9 May 2018 33	Luftëtari	2–2	Partizani	Gjirokastër
16:00 CEST	Beqiri (yellow card) 21'; Rroca (yellow card) 45'; Abazaj 52'; Rapo 70'; Jakovljević (yellow card) 77'	Report	Batha (yellow card) 5'; Asani 26' (yellow card) 26'; Gojković 30'; Mala (yellow card) 30'; Kotobelli (yellow card) 69'; Ćulum (yellow card) 78'	Stadium: Gjirokastra Stadium; Attendance: 1,200; Referee: Ardian Beqiri

13 May 2018 34	Partizani	2–0	Vllaznia	Tirana
17:00 CEST	Progni (yellow card) 25' (goal) 65'; Asani 30'; Telushi (yellow card) 65'	Report	Vucaj (yellow card) 42'	Stadium: Selman Stërmasi Stadium; Attendance: 800; Referee: Enea Jorgji

19 May 2018 35	Flamurtari	1–2	Partizani	Vlorë
17:00 CEST	Rrapaj (yellow card) 85'; Musta 90'	Report	Telushi (yellow card) 25'; Abdurahimi 34'; Progni 71'	Stadium: Flamurtari Stadium; Attendance: 500; Referee: Laver Alla

23 May 2018 36	Partizani	0–1	Kamza	Tirana
17:00 CEST	Belica (yellow card) 59'; Kalari (yellow card) 80'	Report	Rezi 48'; Plaku (yellow card) 71'; Frashëri (yellow card) 76'; Zefi (yellow card) 90'	Stadium: Selman Stërmasi Stadium; Attendance: 500; Referee: Enea Jorgji

=== Albanian Cup ===
==== First round ====
13 September 2017 First leg	Naftëtari	2−6	Partizani	Kuçovë
16:00 CEST	Nallbati 12'; X. Kajo (yellow card) 39' (goal) 73'	Report	Djidjiwa 18', 80' (yellow card) 73'; Malota 44'; Çani 64'; Herrera (yellow card) 66' (goal) 68'; Batha 89' (pen.)	Stadium: Bashkim Sulejmani Stadium; Attendance: 1,000; Referee: Klodian Shahini

27 September 2017 Second leg	Partizani	7−0 (13–2 agg.)	Naftëtari	Kamëz
13:00 CEST	Djidjiwa 4'; J. Bardhi 45', 89'; Basrak 50'; Herrera 67'; Adorján 74'; Shahinas (yellow card) 75' (goal) 80'	Report	E. Kajo (yellow card) 23'; Hyseni (red card) 76'	Stadium: National Sports Centre; Attendance: 50; Referee: Erjon Bastari

==== Second round ====
30 November 2017 First leg	Pogradeci	0−1	Partizani	Pogradec
14:00 CET		Report	Asani (yellow card) 55'; Sulejmani (yellow card) 80'; Sukaj 83'	Stadium: Gjorgji Kyçyku Stadium; Attendance: 300; Referee: Emirjon Sino

13 December 2017 Second leg	Partizani	3−0 (4–0 agg.)	Pogradeci	Kamëz
13:00 CET	Fili 55'; Progni 71'; Batha 75' (yellow card) 85'	Report	Kllogjri (yellow card) 3'; Terolli (yellow card) 65'	Stadium: Kamëz Stadium; Attendance: 100; Referee: Fatjon Xhemalaj

==== Quarter-finals ====
31 January 2018 First leg	Flamurtari	1−0	Partizani	Vlorë
17:00 CET	Položani (yellow card) 28'; Nedeljković (yellow card) 53'; Zuka (yellow card) 62'; Alves 72'; Bušić (yellow card) 90'	Report	Kalari (yellow card) 44'; J. Bardhi (yellow card) 46'; Telushi (yellow card) 63'	Stadium: Flamurtari Stadium; Attendance: 4,000; Referee: Kridens Meta

14 February 2018 Second leg	Partizani	2−1 (2–2a agg.)	Flamurtari	Tirana
17:00 CET	Trashi 38' (yellow card) 64'; Asani 81'	Report	Sidibe 12'; Musta (yellow card) 13'; Bicaj (yellow card) 56'; Siljanovski (yellow card) 70'; Useini (yellow card) 82'	Stadium: Selman Stërmasi Stadium; Attendance: 300; Referee: Emirjon Sino

=== UEFA Europa League ===
==== First qualifying round ====
29 June 2017 First leg	Partizani (Albania)	1–3	(Bulgaria) Botev Plovdiv	Tirana, Albania
17:00 CEST	Sukaj 5' (yellow card) 90+4'; Kotobelli (yellow card) 45+1'	Report	Stoyanov (yellow card) 26'; Kossoko 27', 88'; Baltanov (yellow card) 60'; Nedelev 62'	Stadium: Selman Stërmasi Stadium; Attendance: 2,000; Referee: Bryn Markham-Jones (Wales)

6 July 2017 Second leg	Botev Plovdiv (Bulgaria)	1–0 (4–1 agg.)	(Albania) Partizani	Burgas, Bulgaria (Note: Botev Plovdiv played their home matches at Lazur Stadium, Burgas, instead of their temporary stadium Botev 1912 Football Complex, Plovdiv.)
20:00 EEST	Brisola 22'	Report	Vila (yellow card) 25'; Batha (yellow card) 29'; Ibrahimi (yellow card) 51'; Progni (yellow card) 58'; Kalari (yellow card) 87'	Stadium: Lazur Stadium; Attendance: 3,560; Referee: Alper Ulusoy (Turkey)
