= 2019–20 Macedonian Football Cup =

Tournament details
- Country: North Macedonia
- Dates: 19 August 2019 – 4 March 2020
- Teams: 30

Final positions
- Champions: Abandoned, no champion

Tournament statistics
- Matches played: 38
- Goals scored: 130 (3.42 per match)
- Top goal scorer(s): Martin Stojanov (8 goals)

The 2019–20 Macedonian Football Cup was the 28th season of North Macedonia's football knockout competition. Akademija Pandev were the defending champions, having won their first title in the previous year.

On 4 June 2020, the Football Federation of Macedonia announced that the competition was abandoned due to the increasing number of COVID-19 cases in North Macedonia.

== Competition calendar ==
Round	Date(s)	Fixtures	Clubs	New entries
First Round	19, 20, 21, 28 August 2019	15	30 → 15	30
Second Round	25 September & 30 October 2019	14	14 → 7	none
Quarter-finals	4 December 2019 & 4 March 2020	8	8 → 4	1
~~Semi-finals~~	~~8 April & 6 May 2020~~	~~4~~	~~4 → 2~~	~~none~~
~~Final~~	~~May 2020~~	~~1~~	~~2 → 1~~	~~none~~

== First round ==
The draw was held on 9 August 2019. The finalists from the previous season (Akademija Pandev and Makedonija G.P. received byes.

=== Summary ===
Team 1	Score	Team 2
19 August 2019
Novo Crnilishte (3)	0–22	Bregalnica (2)
20 August 2019
Ljuboten (3)	1–5	Tikvesh (2)
Kit-Go (2)	1–1 (4–5 p)	Pelister (2)
21 August 2019
Ohrid (2)	1–1 (5–4 p)	Belasica (2)
Fortuna (3)	0–4	Sileks (1)
Kozhuf (2)	3–3 (5–6 p)	Renova (1)
Kravari (3)	1–4	Labunishta (2)
Teteks (3)	1–5	Shkupi (1)
Lokomotiva (3)	1–5	Struga (1)
Vëllazërimi 77 (2)	0–4	Rabotnichki (1)
Prevalec (3)	0–4	Borec (1)
Osogovo (2)	1–0	Pobeda (2)
Gostivar (2)	1–4	Shkëndija (1)
28 August 2019
Sasa (2)	0–5	Vardar (1)

=== Matches ===
19 August 2019
17:00 CEST

Novo Crnilishte (3)	0–22	Bregalnica (2)
	Report	Velinov 14', 29', 61'; Osmanoski 16'; Michkovski 38', 42', 63', 78'; D. Stojanov 45+1'; M. Stojanov 46', 53', 57', 85', 87'; Gucev 52', 55'; Nastevski 59', 69', 76', 80'; Manev 74'; Gorgiev 84'

Gradski stadion, Shtip
Referee: Igor Ivanov (Veles)

20 August 2019
17:00 CEST

Ljuboten (3)	1–5	Tikvesh (2)
Dimitrieski 41'	Report	Peev 8'; Lazarov 21'; Ristovski 47', 62'; Mitev 88'

Gradski stadion, Kavadarci
Referee: Ivana Projkovska (Skopje)

20 August 2019
17:00 CEST

Kit-Go (2)	1–1	Pelister (2)
Simevski 81'	Report	Momirovski 90+2'
Penalties
Tashkov (penalty scored); Simevski (penalty scored); Rajkov (penalty scored); Tikveshanac (penalty scored); Sinev (penalty missed)	4–5	(penalty scored) Ljamchevski; (penalty scored) Trifunovski; (penalty scored) Angjeleski; (penalty scored) Shoposki; (penalty scored) Boshkovski

Gradski stadion, Pehchevo
Referee: Riste Sejmenov (Strumica)

21 August 2019
17:00 CEST

Ohrid (2)	1–1	Belasica (2)
Kochoski 6'	Report	Mirchevski 36'
Penalties
	5–4

SRC Biljanini Izvori, Ohrid
Referee: Furkan Idrizi (Tetovo)

21 August 2019
17:00 CEST

Fortuna (3)	0–4	Sileks (1)
	Report	Duranski 7', 21'; Timovski 22'; Žeravica 56'

Stadion Boris Trajkovski, Skopje
Referee: Bobi Velichkov (Veles)

21 August 2019
17:00 CEST

Kozhuf (2)	3–3	Renova (1)
Zumrovski 13'; Petrov 65'; Trajchevski 79'	Report	Miovski 48'; Velija 63'; Mishkovski 87' (pen.)
Penalties
Churlinov (penalty scored); Tanov (penalty scored); Todorov (penalty scored); Karakamishev (penalty missed); Djinov (penalty scored); Bejkov (penalty scored); Trajchevski (penalty missed)	5–6	(penalty scored) Gafuri; (penalty scored) J. Selmani; (penalty missed) R. Selmani; (penalty scored) Skenderi; (penalty scored) Mishovski; (penalty scored) Ademi; (penalty scored) Kadriu

Gradski stadion, Gevgelija
Referee: Petar Mantev (Negotino)

21 August 2019
17:00 CEST

Kravari (3)	1–4	Labunishta (2)
Talevski 66'	Report	Jakimoski 37', 45+2'; Gjoreski 55'; Zuberovski 79' (o.g.)

Stadion Tumbe Kafe, Bitola
Referee: Vlatko Ilioski (Prilep)

21 August 2019
17:00 CEST

Teteks (3)	1–5	Struga (1)
Mihajlovski 82'	Report	Jurina 14', 77'; Serginho 53', 66', 85'

Gradski stadion, Tetovo
Referee: Nderim Tefiku (Kumanovo)

21 August 2019
17:00 CEST

Lokomotiva (3)	1–5	Struga (1)
Mojsovski 79' (pen.)	Report	Cake 3'; Osmani 21', 56'; Jahja 52'; Ramadani 88'

Gradska Plazha, Struga
Referee: Marjan Stojanovski (Kichevo)

21 August 2019
17:00 CEST

Vëllazërimi 77 (2)	0–4	Rabotnichki (1)
	Report	Stojkov 38'; Papović 53'; Fazliju 56'; Toshevski 84'

Vëllazërimi Arena, (Kichevo
Referee: Albrim Shakjiri (Struga)

21 August 2019
17:00 CEST

Prevalec (3)	0–4	Borec (1)
	Report	Bogdanovski 3'; Zhoglev 18'; Hristov 53' (pen.), 75' (pen.)

Gradski stadion, Veles
Referee: Irena Velevachkoska (Prilep)

21 August 2019
17:00 CEST

Osogovo (2)	1–0	Pobeda (2)
Kostovski 11'	Report

Stadion Nikola Mantov, Kochani
Referee: Darko Stojchevski (Skopje)

21 August 2019
17:00 CEST

Gostivar (2)	1–4	Shkendija (1)
Stankovski 86'	Report	Juan Felipe 39'; Imeri 57'; B. Ibraimi 84'; Beqiri 87'

Gradski stadion, Gostivar
Referee: Marjan Mladenovski (Skopje)

28 August 2019
17:00 CEST

Sasa (2)	0–5	Vardar (1)
	Report	Ibishi 4'; Ignatov 30'; Cvetanoski 39', 61'; Avramovski 83'

Gradski stadion, Makedonska Kamenica
Referee: Marjan Gocevski (Strumica)

== Second round ==
The draw was held on 30 August 2019. The first legs were played on 25 September and the second legs were played on 30 and 31 October 2019.

=== Summary ===
Team 1	Agg.	Team 2	1st leg	2nd leg
Pelister (2)	1–5	Rabotnichki (1)	1–1	0–4
Akademija Pandev (1)	7–1	Osogovo (2)	3–0	4–1
Bregalnica (2)	1–0	Makedonija G.P. (1)	1–0	0–0
Tikvesh (2)	1–3	Renova (1)	0–2	1–1
Labunishta (2)	5–2	Ohrid (2)	2–0	3–2
Borec (1)	0–1	Struga (1)	0–0	0–1
Vardar (1)	2–3	Shkëndija (1)	2–2	0–1
Shkupi (1)	(a) 1–1	Sileks (1)	0–0	1–1

=== Matches ===
25 September 2019
15:30 CEST

Pelister (2)	1–1	Rabotnichki (1)
Glavevski 39'	Report	Sharkoski 64'

Stadion Tumbe Kafe, Bitola
Referee: Marjan Stojanoski (Kichevo)
30 October 2019
13:30 CET

Rabotnichki (1)	4–0	Pelister (2)
Herrera 32' (pen.); Marković 60'; Jevtoski 63'; Toshevski 75'	Report

Stadion Boris Trajkovski, Skopje
Referee: Albrim Shakjiri (Struga)

Rabotnichki won 5–1 on aggregate.

25 September 2019
15:30 CEST

Akademija Pandev (1)	3–0	Osogovo (2)
Stoilov 23', 49'; Rajković 47'	Report

Stadion Mladost, Strumica
Referee: Furkan Idrizi (Tetovo)
30 October 2019
13:30 CET

Osogovo (2)	1–4	Akademija Pandev (1)
Ramić 10'	Report	Manevski 5'; Krstovski 51', 59', 68'

Stadion Nikola Mantov, Kochani
Referee: Vlatko Ilioski (Prilep)

Akademija Pandev won 7–1 on aggregate.

25 September 2019
15:30 CEST

Bregalnica (2)	1–0	Makedonija G.P. (1)
Gorgiev 41'	Report

Gradski stadion, Shtip
Referee: Vasko Mavrov (Strumica)
30 October 2019
13:30 CET

Makedonija G.P. (1)	0–0	Bregalnica (2)
	Report

Stadion Gjorche Petrov, Skopje
Referee: Bobi Velichkov (Veles)

Bregalnica won 1–0 on aggregate.

25 September 2019
15:30 CEST

Tikvesh (2)	0–2	Renova (1)
	Report	Selmani 88'; Zuka 90'

Gradski stadion, Kavadarci
Referee: Albrim Shakjiri (Struga)
31 October 2019
13:30 CET

Renova (1)	1–1	Tikvesh (2)
Ademi 86'	Report	Ilieski 22'

Gradski stadion, Tetovo
Referee: Dejan Mladenovski (Skopje)

Renova won 3–1 on aggregate.

25 September 2019
15:30 CEST

Labunishta (2)	2–0	Ohrid (2)
Lekoski 11' (o.g.); Dalcheski 50'	Report

Gradska Plazha, Struga
Referee: Bobi Velichkov (Veles)
30 October 2019
13:30 CET

Ohrid (2)	2–3	Labunishta (2)
Celeski 32'; Sekuloski 57'	Report	Saliu 4'; Dauti 12'; Kazimoski 8'

SRC Biljanini Izvori, Ohrid
Referee: Petar Mantev (Negotino)

Labunishta won 5–2 on aggregate.

25 September 2019
15:30 CEST

Borec (1)	0–0	Struga (1)
	Report

Stadion Zoran Paunov, Veles
Referee: Marjan Mladenovski (Skopje)
30 October 2019
13:30 CET

Struga (1)	1–0	Borec (1)
Lena 47'	Report

Gradska Plazha, Struga
Referee: Krumislav Gjorgiev (Shtip)

Struga won 1–0 on aggregate.

25 September 2019
15:30 CEST

Vardar (1)	2–2	Shkëndija (1)
Kolevski 72'; Juninho 80'	Report	Imeri 8'; B. Ibraimi 42'

Toshe Proeski Arena, Skopje
Referee: Dejan Jakimovski (Skopje)
30 October 2019
13:30 CET

Shkëndija (1)	1–0	Vardar (1)
A. Ibraimi 74'	Report

Gradski stadion, Tetovo
Referee: Marjan Eckoski (Ohrid)

Shkëndija won 3–2 on aggregate.

25 September 2019
15:30 CEST

Shkupi (1)	0–0	Sileks (1)
	Report

Stadion Chair, Skopje
Referee: Josip Barton (Skopje)
30 October 2019
13:30 CET

Sileks (1)	1–1	Shkupi (1)
Dodev 11'	Report	Jurina 72'

Gradski stadion, Kratovo
Referee: Blagojche Ralevski (Bitola)

1–1 on aggregate. Shkupi won on away goals.

== Quarter-finals ==
The draw was held on 1 November 2019. first legs were played on 4 December 2019 and the second legs were played on 4 March 2020.

=== Summary ===
Team 1	Agg.	Team 2	1st leg	2nd leg
Shkëndija (1)	(a) 3–3	Rabotnichki (1)	1–1	2–2
Shkupi (1)	1–2	Akademija Pandev (1)	0–1	1–1
Struga (1)	2–1	Renova (1)	0–0	2–1
Bregalnica (2)	5–1	Labunishta (2)	1–0	4–1

=== Matches ===
4 December 2019
13:00 CET

Shkëndija (1)	1–1	Rabotnichki (1)
Júnior 8'	Report	Stojkov 33'

Gradski stadion, Tetovo
Referee: Bobi Velichkov (Veles)
4 March 2020
14:00 CET

Rabotnichki (1)	2–2	Shkëndija (1)
Jevtoski 72' (pen.); Krstovski 85'	Report	Nafiu 37'; Ibraimi 75'

Toshe Proeski Arena, Skopje
Referee: Vasko Mavrov (Strumica)

3–3 on aggregate. Shkëndija won on away goals.

4 December 2019
13:00 CET

Shkupi (1)	0–1	Akademija Pandev (1)
	Report	Temelkov 90+3'

Stadion Chair, Skopje
Referee: Dimitar Mechkarovski (Skopje)
4 March 2020
14:00 CET

Akademija Pandev (1)	1–1	Shkupi (1)
Doriev 61'	Report	Darboe 75'

Stadion Mladost, Strumica
Referee: Krumislav Gjorgiev (Shtip)

Akademija Pandev won 2–1 on aggregate.

4 December 2019
13:00 CET

Struga (1)	0–0	Renova (1)
	Report

Gradska Plazha, Struga
Referee: Marjan Gocevski (Strumica)
4 March 2020
14:00 CET

Renova (1)	1–2	Struga (1)
Kadriu 23'	Report	Deliaj 43'; Cvetanoski 82'

Gradski stadion, Tetovo
Referee: Dimitar Mechkarovski (Skopje)

Struga won 2–1 on aggregate.

4 December 2019
13:00 CET

Bregalnica (2)	1–0	Labunishta (2)
M. Stojanov 51'	Report

Gradski stadion, Shtip
Referee: Blagojche Ralevski (Bitola)
4 March 2020
14:00 CET

Labunishta (2)	1–4	Bregalnica (2)
Hasan 53'	Report	M. Stojanov 23' (pen.), 38'; Dodev 42'; Stojchevski 87'

Gradska Plazha, Struga
Referee: Stojanche Trpchevski (Kavadarci)

Bregalnica won 5–1 on aggregate.

== Season statistics ==
=== Top scorers ===
As of 4 March 2020

Rank	Player	Club	Goals
1	(North Macedonia) Martin Stojanov	Bregalnica	8
2	(North Macedonia) Toni Michkovski	Bregalnica	4
2	(North Macedonia) Ivan Nastevski	Bregalnica	4
4	(North Macedonia) Besart Ibraimi	Shkëndija	3
4	(Bosnia and Herzegovina) Marin Jurina	Shkupi	3
4	(North Macedonia) Mario Krstovski	Akademija Pandev and Rabotnichki	3
4	(Brazil) Serginho	Shkupi	3
4	(North Macedonia) Stojancho Velinov	Bregalnica	3

== See also ==
- 2019–20 Macedonian First Football League
- 2019–20 Macedonian Second Football League
