= 2016–17 KF Laçi season =

Laçi
2016–17 season
- Chairman: Pashk Laska
- Manager: Marcello Troisi
- Stadium: Laçi Stadium
- Kategoria Superiore: 6th
- Albanian Cup: Quarter-finals
Home colours	Third colours

This article covers the 2016–17 season for Laçi. They'll participate in the Kategoria Superiore and the Albanian Cup.

== Squad ==
=== First team squad ===
As of 12 August 2016.

Note: Flags indicate national team as defined under FIFA eligibility rules; some limited exceptions apply. Players may hold more than one non-FIFA nationality.

No.	Pos.	Nation	Player
1	GK	ALB	Gentian Selmani
9	FW	ALB	Aldo Mitraj
11	DF	ALB	Taulant Sefgjinaj
14	MF	ALB	Argjend Mustafa
15	FW	ALB	Kejvi Bardhi
16	DF	ALB	Eglentin Gjoni
17	FW	ALB	Sebastian David Lais
18	MF	ALB	Regi Lushkja
20	FW	ALB	Dardan Vuthaj
33	FW	ALB	Drilon Musaj
—	MF	ALB	Alked Çelhaka
—	FW	ALB	Darlien Bajaziti

No.	Pos.	Nation	Player
—	DF	ALB	Denis Biba
—	MF	ALB	Bruno Lipi
—	DF	ALB	Harallamb Qaqi
—	MF	ALB	Ilir Kastrati
—	FW	FRA	Kris Hyseni
—	MF	ALB	Klajdi Toska
—	MF	BRA	Maicon Esquerda
—	FW	BRA	Robert Ribeiro
—	FW	BRA	Rafael Medeiros
—	FW	BRA	Taubaté
—	FW	BRA	Zhunior Pinto

== Transfers ==
=== In ===
Date	Pos.	Name	From	Fee
1 July 2016	MF	(Albania) Alked Çelhaka	(Albania) Besa Kavajë	Undisclosed
1 July 2016	MF	(Albania) Bruno Lipi	(Albania) Bylis Ballsh	Undisclosed
1 July 2016	MF	(Albania) Darlien Bajaziti	(Albania) Besa Kavajë	Undisclosed
1 July 2016	DF	(Albania) Denis Biba	(Albania) Erzeni	Undisclosed
1 July 2016	DF	(Albania) Harallamb Qaqi	(Italy) Hellas Verona	Undisclosed
1 July 2016	MF	(Albania) Ilir Kastrati	(Albania) Sopoti Librazhd	Undisclosed
1 July 2016	MF	(Albania) Klajdi Toska	Free agent	Free
1 July 2016	FW	(France) Kris Hyseni	(France) Olympique Lyonnais	Undisclosed
1 July 2016	MF	(Brazil) Maicon Esquerda	(Brazil) Metropolitano	Undisclosed
1 July 2016	FW	(Brazil) Rafael Medeiros	(Brazil) Operário	Undisclosed
1 July 2016	FW	(Brazil) Robert Ribeiro	(Brazil) Espírito Santo	Undisclosed
1 July 2016	FW	(Brazil) Taubaté	(Brazil) Santa Rita	Undisclosed
1 July 2016	MF	(Brazil) Zhunior Pinto	Free agent	Free

=== Out ===
Date	Pos.	Name	To	Fee
1 July 2016	MF	(Albania) Alfred Zefi	(Albania) Korabi Peshkopi	Undisclosed
1 July 2016	DF	(Albania) Arjan Sheta	(Albania) Korabi Peshkopi	Undisclosed
1 July 2016	DF	(Albania) Emiliano Çela	(Albania) Korabi Peshkopi	Undisclosed
1 July 2016	MF	(Albania) Emiliano Veliaj	(Albania) Korabi Peshkopi	Undisclosed
1 July 2016	MF	(Montenegro) Marko Ćetković	(Bosnia and Herzegovina) Sarajevo	Undisclosed
1 July 2016	GK	(Montenegro) Miroslav Vujadinović	(Albania) Korabi Peshkopi	Undisclosed
1 July 2016	MF	(Albania) Olsi Gocaj	(Albania) Vllaznia Shkodër	Undisclosed
20 July 2016	DF	(Croatia) Stipe Buljan	Free agent	Free
6 August 2016	MF	(Albania) Albi Dosti	(Croatia) Šibenik	Undisclosed

== Pre-season and friendlies ==
6 August Friendly	Besëlidhja Lezhë (Albania)	2–2	(Albania) Laçi
19:00 CET	I. Kastrati (o.g.); Kamara	Report	M. Esquerda; E. Malindi

== Competitions ==
=== Kategoria Superiore ===
==== League table ====
Pos	Team	Pld	W	D	L	GF	GA	GD	Pts
4	Luftëtari	36	11	11	14	37	45	−8	44
5	Teuta	36	10	10	16	27	34	−7	40
6	Laçi	36	10	10	16	23	35	−12	40
7	Vllaznia	36	8	16	12	29	35	−6	40
8	Flamurtari (Note: Flamurtari were deducted six points for failing to fulfill financial obligations.)	36	12	10	14	42	34	+8	40

Source: Albanian Football Association (in Albanian), Soccerway
Rules for classification: 1) Points; 2) Head-to-head points; 3) Head-to-head goal difference; 4) Head-to-head goals scored; 5) Goal difference; 6) Goals scored; 7) Draw.

==== Results summary ====
Overall								Home						Away					
Pld	W	D	L	GF	GA	GD	Pts	W	D	L	GF	GA	GD	W	D	L	GF	GA	GD
36	10	10	16	23	35	−12	40	8	5	5	17	16	+1	2	5	11	6	19	−13

Last updated: 27 May 2017.

==== Results by round ====
Round	1	2	3	4	5	6	7	8	9	10	11	12	13	14	15	16	17	18	19	20	21	22	23	24	25	26	27	28	29	30	31	32	33	34	35	36
Ground	A	H	A	H	A	H	A	H	A	H	A	H	A	H	A	H	A	H	A	H	A	H	A	H	A	H	A	H	A	H	A	H	A	H	A	H
Result	D	D	L	D	L	L	W	D	L	W	L	L	L	D	L	W	L	L	W	W	L	D	D	L	L	W	L	W	D	L	L	W	D	W	D	W
Position	5	5	8	7	9	9	7	7	9	8	7	7	8	9	9	8	8	9	9	8	9	8	8	9	9	8	9	8	8	9	9	9	9	8	9	6

Source: Soccerway
A = Away; H = Home; W = Win; D = Draw; L = Loss

==== Matches ====
Win Draw Loss

Matchday 1	v

=== Albanian Cup ===
First Round	v
