= Beqaj =

Beqaj is a surname. Notable people with the surname include:

- Arbri Beqaj (born 1998), Albanian football right back
- Arjan Beqaj (born 1975), Kosovar-born Albanian football goalkeeper and coach
- Ilir Beqaj, Albanian IT engineer and politician
- Perparim Beqaj (born 1995), Swedish football forward
