= Ndriçim Shtubina =

Albanian footballer

Personal information
- Date of birth: 18 March 1987 (age 39)
- Place of birth: Shkodër, Albania
- Height: 1.73 m (5 ft 8 in)
- Position: Left midfielder

Team information
- Current team: Vllaznia Shkodër (assistant coach)

Youth career
- 2000–2006: Vllaznia Shkodër

Senior career*
Years	Team	Apps	(Gls)
2006–2011	Vllaznia Shkodër	90	(14)
2006–2007	→ Ada Velipoje (loan)	1	(1)
2008–2009	→ Skënderbeu (loan)	14	(3)
2011–2012	Flamurtari	20	(1)
2012–2017	Vllaznia Shkodër	148	(24)
2017	Kukësi	10	(0)
2018–2019	Laçi	52	(12)
2019−2020	Vllaznia Shkodër	33	(2)
2020−2022	Egnatia	48	(11)

Managerial career
- 2022–2023: Egnatia (sporting director)
- 2023–: Vllaznia Shkodër (assistant)
- * Club domestic league appearances and goals

Ndriçim Shtubina (born 18 March 1987) is an Albanian professional football coach and a former left midfielder. He is an assistant manager with Vllaznia Shkodër.

== Club career ==
=== Vllaznia ===
He started his youth career at Vllaznia. He will be long remembered for his European goal scored on 9 July 2009 against Irish side Sligo Rovers, in the match valid for 2009–10 UEFA Europa League first qualifying round, where Shtubina played as a starter and scored the match opening goal in the 42nd minute, an equalizing goal in the 84th minute of the second half and finished the game in the 1–1 draw.

In June 2012, Shtubina signed with Vllaznia, returning to Shkodër after a one-year absence. He came from Flamurtari along with his teammate Halim Begaj. During an interview, Shtubina said that he returned to Vllaznia with the goal of winning the championship, however, Vllaznia finished in 6th place, failing to secure a spot in European competitions next season.

==== 2012–13 season ====
Shtubina started 2012–13 season by appearing as a second-half substitute in team's opening league match against Skënderbeu, which finished in a 1–3 home loss. In November 2012, he suffered a knee injury that kept him sidelined until January 2013. He returned to the football field on 8 February by appearing as a substitute in the last moments of the 1–0 away win against Skënderbeu, replacing the goalscorer Arsen Hajdari.

On 4 May, Shtubina scored his first goal of the season during the 3–1 league loss to his former club Flamurtari, which was his only strike of the season. During the 2012–13 season, Shtubina played 17 out of 26 league matches, in addition 3 cup matches, as Vllaznia was eliminated in the second round to Shkumbini. The team finished the championship in a disappointing sixth place, remaining out of European competitions once again. Following the end of the season, due to negative results, Shtubina said that there is a possibility for him to leave the club.

==== 2013–14 season ====
Shtubina started his seventh season as a Vllaznia player by playing full-90 minutes in a 0–1 home loss to Flamurtari in the team's first league match of 2013–14 season. On 18 September, he opened his scoring account by netting the opener of a 2–0 win against Tirana in the Albanian derby. He scored his second league goal in the matchday 8 against Kastrioti on 20 October, leading the team into a 2–1 home success. A week later, he scored the winner against the newly promoted side Partizani for another three important points.

Shtubina started 2014 by scoring a last-minute winner against Teuta, earning his side a point at home. He continued with his solid appearances by netting the second of a 2–0 away win against Laçi on 23 March; the goal came after a solo run. Seven days later, he scored the lone goal of the 1–0 home win against Skënderbeu, which was his sixth of the season, equaling his personal best set in 2010–11 season. A minute after scoring, he received a yellow card meaning that he would miss the next league match against Lushnja. Shtubina returned in action on 19 April and set his mark by scoring the third goal of the 4–2 away win over Kastrioti, setting a new personal best. It was the third match in a row that he score a goal. Shtubina ended the season with 7 goals and 30 appearances throughout the season, with Vllaznia managing to stay in Kategoria Superiore for another season.

==== 2014–15 season ====
During summer transfer window, many rumors circulating for a possible departure of Shtubina from the club, as Partizani and Teuta were set to acquire his services. However, he agreed a contract extension with the club in July 2014, and was named club captain for 2014–15 season.

He played his first match of the season in team's opening league match 2014–15 season against Kukësi, featuring in the entire match. Shtubina scored his first goal of the season on 11 September 2014 from a direct corner-kick in a 1–1 draw against Tirana in the Albanian derby which was infamously marred by crowd trouble which saw 13 people arrested and both clubs' fans receiving lengthy stadium bans. Following that, on 20 September 2014, he scored a brace in a 2–0 win over Apolonia, taking his tally up to three league goals. In the post-match interview, Shtubina dedicated his goals to the club's fans.

==== 2015–16 season ====
Shtbuina opened the season by playing full-90 minutes in team's opening league match against Skënderbeu on 9 September 2015 which finished in a 1–0 defeat. He scored his first goal of the season on 17 October in Vllaznia Shkodër's 3–0 defeat of Tërbuni, netting in the first minute of the match. On 23 December, in the last match of 2015, Shtubina scored in the second minute of the match against fellow relegation strugglers Bylis in an eventual 3–2 home win.

With the arrival of the new coach Armando Cungu, Shtubina kept his place in the starting lineup, playing five matches between January and February. On 13 March, he scored the second in a 3–1 win over rivals Tirana at Reshit Rusi Stadium. On 30 April, in the 3–2 away defeat to Laçi in the matchday 32, Shtubina made his 200th appearance for Vllaznia. On 8 May, he scored his sixth league goal of the season in the 2–0 home win against Tërbuni, giving his team three crucial points in their bid to escape relegation.

Shtubina ended his ninth season as a Vllaznia player by playing 36 matches in all competitions, including 33 in league, as the team managed to secure a spot in Kategoria Superiore for the next season. He also scored six league goals, being the team top goalscorer along with Eraldo Çinari.

==== 2016–17 season ====
On 10 June 2016, Shtubina signed a new two-year deal with the club, keeping him at the club until June 2018. After refusing to train for days, on 24 July 2017, Shtubina announced via a Facebook status that he was a free agent, after failing to find a way with the club for the new contract.

=== Kukësi ===
On 29 July 2017, Shtubina agreed personal terms and completed a transfer to fellow top flight side Kukësi for the 2017–18 season. He was presented to media the same day and was given squad number 10, last worn by Jean Carioca, stating: "I'm thankful to Kukësi directors for believing in me." He made his competitive debut on 6 September by starting in the 2017 Albanian Supercup match against Tirana which was lost 0–1. His league debut occurred three days later, playing 76 minutes in the opening matchday of championship against newbie Kamza as Kukësi won 1–0 at home. Shtubina however lost his place in lineup very soon and finished first phase of championship with only 192 minutes from 6 matches, only one as starter. He opened his scoring account on 13 December by netting in the 5–1 home win over Erzeni in the second leg of 2017–18 Albanian Cup second round. Ten days later, he announced his departure from the club only one day following the loss to Lufëtari.

=== Laçi ===
On 30 December 2017, Shtubina joined Laçi as a free agent, signing a contract until the end of the season. Aged 30, Shtubina was the second oldest member of the team, with the oldest being captain Taulant Sefgjinaj at 31. He was given squad number 18, and made his debut by starting in the 3–1 away loss at Kazma, playing for 61 minutes before making place for Arbri Beqaj. His first score-sheet contributions came later in his sixth appearance for the club, netting his team's first goal in an eventual 2–2 draw against Luftëtari at home.

== Career statistics ==
As of 18 February 2018

Club statistics
Club	Season	League			Cup		Europe		Other		Total	
Club	Season	Division	Apps	Goals	Apps	Goals	Apps	Goals	Apps	Goals	Apps	Goals
Vllaznia	2006–07	Kategoria Superiore	0	0	0	0	—		—		0	0
Ada	2007–08	Kategoria e Parë	?	?	1	1	—		—		1+	1+
Skënderbeu	2007–08	Kategoria Superiore	14	3	0	0	—		—		14	3
Vllaznia	2008–09	Kategoria Superiore	29	3	8	2	—		—		37	5
Vllaznia	2009–10	Kategoria Superiore	32	5	6	2	2 (Note: All appearance(s) in UEFA Europa League)	1	—		40	8
Vllaznia	2010–11	Kategoria Superiore	28	6	3	2	—		—		31	8
Vllaznia	2011–12	Kategoria Superiore	—		—		2	0	—		2	0
Vllaznia	Total		89	14	17	6	4	1	—		110	21
Flamurtari	2011–12	Kategoria Superiore	20	1	11	0	—		—		31	1
Vllaznia	2012–13	Kategoria Superiore	17	1	3	0	—		—		20	1
Vllaznia	2013–14	Kategoria Superiore	30	7	2	0	—		—		32	7
Vllaznia	2014–15	Kategoria Superiore	34	4	2	0	—		—		36	4
Vllaznia	2015–16	Kategoria Superiore	33	6	3	0	—		—		36	6
Vllaznia	2016–17	Kategoria Superiore	34	6	3	1	—		—		37	7
Vllaznia	Total		148	24	13	1	—		—		161	25
Kukësi	2017–18	Kategoria Superiore	10	0	3	1	—		1 (Note: Appearance in Albanian Supercup)	0	13	1
Laçi	2017–18	Kategoria Superiore	4	1	2	0	—		—		6	1
Career total			285	43	47	10	4	1	1	0	336	54
