= Romeo Shahinas =

Albanian footballer

Personal information
- Date of birth: 25 February 1996 (age 30)
- Place of birth: Korçë, Albania
- Height: 1.72 m (5 ft 8 in)
- Position: Midfielder

Team information
- Current team: Arce

Youth career
- 2005–2008: Fabrica Carbognano
- 2009–2014: Roma
- 2014–2016: Latina

Senior career*
Years	Team	Apps	(Gls)
2015–2017	Latina	1	(0)
2016–2017	→ Racing Roma (loan)	18	(1)
2017	Partizani Tirana B	4	(0)
2017	Partizani Tirana	0	(0)
2018	Rotonda		
2019-	Arce		

International career^{‡}
2012	Albania U17	2	(0)
2014	Albania U19	1	(0)
- * Club domestic league appearances and goals as of 22 November 2017 ‡ National team caps and goals as of 14 May 2014

Romeo Shahinas (born 25 February 1996) is an Albanian professional footballer who plays as a midfielder for Italian club Arce and the Albania national under-21 football team.

== Club career ==
=== Early career ===
Shahinas was born in Korçë, Albania and at age of 9 he moved to Italy alongside his family. A year after he made his first steps to football as he was registered at Fabrica Carbognano, a comune (municipality) in the Province of Viterbo in the Italian region of Latium, located about 50 kilometres (31 mi) northwest of Rome, where he played for 3 years. During his time with Fabrica Carbognano he caught attention of A.S. Roma scouts and when they saw him during a tournament they invited him for a trial. During his trial Roma's scouts said that they were pleasured with his form and will offer him to sign a contract after a year. He had offers from different Italian clubs such as S.S. Lazio, ACF Fiorentina and Empoli F.C. but decided to sign with Roma in 2009.

=== Latina ===
On 28 July 2014 he signed for U.S. Latina and was put into the primavera team. During the second half of the 2014–15 season of Serie B he gained entry with the first team and participated in 4 matches.

He made it his professional debut on 2 April 2016 against Avellino coming on as a substitute in place of Pasquale Schiattarella.

=== Partizani Tirana ===
Following arrival of Mark Iuliano as a head coach of FK Partizani Tirana, he brought along Shahinas and Andrea Selvaggio with parameters 0. Shortly after the departure of coach Mark Iuliano, Partizani announced to have interrupted contracts by mutual consensus with Shahinas along Andrea Selvaggio, Eric Herrera and Milan Basrak.

In summer 2019, Shahinas signed for US Arce after a spell at Rotonda Calcio.

== International career ==
Shahinas received his first Albania under-17 call-up by manager Džemal Mustedanagić for a friendly tournament developed in August 2012 in Romania.

Shahinas participated with the Albania national under-17 football team in the 2013 UEFA European Under-17 Championship qualifying round during October 2012. Under the national coach Dzemal Mustedanagić he played in 2 matches, 1 as a starter and 1 as a substitute, also being an unused substitute on the bench for 1 match.

He was invited once at the Albania national under-19 football team by coach Foto Strakosha for the friendly match against Italy U19 on 14 May 2014.

== Personal life ==
Shahinas has declared that he is a fan of A.S. Roma and that was the reason that he signed immediately with them in first offer, despite other offers. His inspirations are Daniele De Rossi at Roma and Lorik Cana, the Albania national team's captain for their style of warriors on the pitch.

== Career statistics ==
=== Club ===
As of 22 November 2017

Club statistics
Club	Season	League			Cup		Europe (Note: Including continental competitions, such as UEFA Champions League and UEFA Europa League)		Other		Total	
Club	Season	Division	Apps	Goals	Apps	Goals	Apps	Goals	Apps	Goals	Apps	Goals
Latina	2014–15	Serie B	0	0	—		—		—		0	0
Latina	2015–16	Serie B	1	0	—		—		—		1	0
Latina	2016–17	Serie B	—		0	0	—		—		0	0
Latina	Total		1	0	0	0	—		—		1	0
Racing Roma	2016–17	Lega Pro	18	1	—		—		—		18	1
Partizani Tirana B	2017–18	Albanian Second Division	4	0	—		—		—		4	0
Partizani Tirana	2017–18	Albanian Superliga	0	0	2	1	—		—		2	1
Career total			23	1	2	1	—		—		25	2
