= Renato Gojković =

Bosnian footballer (born 1995)

Personal information
- Date of birth: 10 September 1995 (age 31)
- Place of birth: Tuzla, Bosnia and Herzegovina
- Height: 1.95 m (6 ft 5 in)
- Position: Centre-back

Team information
- Current team: Sarajevo
- Number: 3

Youth career
- 2002–2012: Sloboda Tuzla

Senior career*
Years	Team	Apps	(Gls)
2012–2013	Sloboda Tuzla	18	(3)
2013–2015	Čelik Zenica	40	(0)
2015–2018	Istra 1961	49	(0)
2018–2019	Partizani	23	(2)
2019–2020	Zrinjski Mostar	19	(2)
2020–2024	Orenburg	86	(7)
2024–2025	Maccabi Petah Tikva	12	(1)
2025–	Sarajevo	14	(0)

International career
2013	Bosnia and Herzegovina U19	10	(0)
2014–2015	Bosnia and Herzegovina U21	2	(0)
2023	Bosnia and Herzegovina	4	(1)
- * Club domestic league appearances and goals as of 8 August 2026

Renato Gojković (pronounced [rěnato ɡôːjkoʋitɕ]; born 10 September 1995) is a Bosnian professional footballer who plays as a centre-back for Bosnian Premier League club Sarajevo.

Gojković started his professional career at Sloboda Tuzla, before joining Čelik Zenica in 2013. Two years later, he moved to Istra 1961. In 2018, he signed with Partizani. The following year, he switched to Zrinjski Mostar. Gojković joined Orenburg in 2020. Four years later, he moved to Maccabi Petah Tikva. In 2025, he moved to Sarajevo.

A former youth international for Bosnia and Herzegovina, Gojković made his senior international debut in 2023, earning 4 caps.

== Club career ==
Gojković came through the youth academy of his hometown club Sloboda Tuzla, which he joined in 2002. He made his professional debut against Goražde on 11 August 2012 at the age of 16. On 28 October, he scored a brace in a triumph over Iskra Bugojno, which were his first professional goals.

In July 2013, he switched to Čelik Zenica.

In July 2015, Gojković moved to Croatian team Istra 1961.

In January 2018, he was transferred to Albanian side Partizani.

In January 2019, he joined Zrinjski Mostar.

In September 2020, he signed with Russian outfit Orenburg.

In September 2024, Gojković moved to Israeli team Maccabi Petah Tikva.

In January 2025, he joined Sarajevo. In March, he suffered a severe knee injury, which was diagnosed as an anterior cruciate ligament tear and was ruled out for at least six months. In August 2026, he suffered a ruptured anterior cruciate ligament again and was expected to be sidelined for the rest of the season.

== International career ==
Gojković represented Bosnia and Herzegovina at various youth levels.

In October 2023, he received his first senior call up, for UEFA Euro 2024 qualifiers against Liechtenstein and Portugal. He debuted against the former on 13 October.

On 16 November, in a UEFA Euro 2024 qualifier against Luxembourg, Gojković scored his first senior international goal.

== Personal life ==
Gojković married his long-time girlfriend Josipa in July 2020. Together they have a son named Jakov and a daughter named Mari.

== Career statistics ==
=== Club ===
As of match played 8 August 2026

Appearances and goals by club, season and competition
Club	Season	League			National cup (Note: Includes Bosnian Cup, Croatian Cup, Albanian Cup, Russian Cup, Israel State Cup)		Continental		Other		Total	
Club	Season	Division	Apps	Goals	Apps	Goals	Apps	Goals	Apps	Goals	Apps	Goals
Sloboda Tuzla	2012–13	First League of the FBiH	18	3	–		–		–		18	3
Čelik Zenica	2013–14	Bosnian Premier League	19	0	3	1	–		–		22	1
Čelik Zenica	2014–15	Bosnian Premier League	21	0	2	0	–		–		23	0
Čelik Zenica	Total		40	0	5	1	–		–		45	1
Istra 1961	2015–16	Croatian Football League	18	0	2	0	–		2 (Note: Appearances in Croatian Football League relegation play-offs)	0	22	0
Istra 1961	2016–17	Croatian Football League	19	0	2	0	–		–		21	0
Istra 1961	2017–18	Croatian Football League	12	0	2	1	–		–		14	1
Istra 1961	Total		49	0	6	1	–		2	0	57	1
Partizani	2017–18	Kategoria Superiore	19	2	1	0	–		–		20	2
Partizani	2018–19	Kategoria Superiore	4	0	2	0	2 (Note: Appearances in UEFA Europa League)	0	–		8	0
Partizani	Total		23	2	3	0	2	0	–		28	2
Zrinjski Mostar	2018–19	Bosnian Premier League	6	1	2	0	–		–		8	1
Zrinjski Mostar	2019–20	Bosnian Premier League	13	1	1	0	2	1	–		16	2
Zrinjski Mostar	Total		19	2	3	0	2	1	–		24	3
Orenburg	2020–21	Russian First League	19	4	1	0	–		–		20	4
Orenburg	2021–22	Russian First League	28	2	1	0	–		2 (Note: Appearances in Russian Premier League relegation play-offs)	1	31	3
Orenburg	2022–23	Russian Premier League	24	1	3	0	–		–		27	1
Orenburg	2023–24	Russian Premier League	15	0	6	0	–		–		21	0
Orenburg	Total		86	7	11	0	–		2	1	99	8
Maccabi Petah Tikva	2024–25	Israeli Premier League	12	1	1	0	–		–		13	1
Sarajevo	2024–25	Bosnian Premier League	5	0	3	0	–		–		8	0
Sarajevo	2025–26	Bosnian Premier League	8	0	3	0	0	0	1 (Note: Appearance in Bosnian Supercup)	0	12	0
Sarajevo	2026–27	Bosnian Premier League	1	0	0	0	1 (Note: Appearance in UEFA Conference League)	0	–		2	0
Sarajevo	Total		14	0	6	0	1	0	1	0	22	0
Career total			261	15	35	2	5	1	5	1	306	19

=== International ===
Appearances and goals by national team and year
National team	Year	Apps	Goals
Bosnia and Herzegovina
Bosnia and Herzegovina	2023	4	1
Total		4	1

Scores and results list Bosnia and Herzegovina's goal tally first, score column indicates score after each Gojković goal.

List of international goals scored by Renato Gojković
No.	Date	Venue	Cap	Opponent	Score	Result	Competition
1	16 November 2023	Stade de Luxembourg, Luxembourg City, Luxembourg	3	Luxembourg	1–3	1–4	UEFA Euro 2024 qualifying

== Honours ==
Sarajevo

- Bosnian Cup: 2024–25
