= Milan Ćulum =

Serbian footballer (born 1984)

Personal information
- Date of birth: 28 October 1984 (age 42)
- Place of birth: Novi Sad, SR Serbia, SFR Yugoslavia
- Height: 2.00 m (6 ft 7 in)
- Position: Defensive midfielder

Team information
- Current team: Jedinstvo Surčin (manager)

Youth career
- Slavija Novi Sad

Senior career*
| Years | Team | Apps | (Gls) |
| 2003–2004 | Cement Beočin | 20 | (2) |
| 2004–2006 | OFK Beograd | 14 | (0) |
| 2005 | → Srem (loan) | 6 | (2) |
| 2005 | → Srem (loan) | 3 | (0) |
| 2006 | → Spartak Subotica (loan) | 16 | (0) |
| 2006 | → Srem (loan) | 11 | (0) |
| 2007–2008 | Čukarički | 27 | (5) |
| 2008–2009 | Smederevo | 25 | (2) |
| 2009–2011 | Željezničar | 43 | (1) |
| 2011 | Volgar Astrakhan | 3 | (0) |
| 2012–2013 | Hajduk Kula | 23 | (2) |
| 2013–2014 | Radnički Niš | 27 | (0) |
| 2014 | Radnički Kragujevac | 11 | (0) |
| 2015 | Radnički Niš | 10 | (0) |
| 2015 | Radnik Surdulica | 20 | (6) |
| 2016–2017 | Rad | 35 | (4) |
| 2017 | Sloboda Tuzla | 13 | (1) |
| 2018 | Partizani Tirana | 11 | (0) |
| 2018 | Inter Zaprešić | 9 | (0) |
| 2019 | Kolubara | 9 | (2) |
| 2019 | Borac Čačak | 14 | (1) |
| Total | | 350 | (28) |

Managerial career
- 2022-2023: Žarkovo
- 2023-2024: Sinđelić Beograd
- 2024-: Jedinstvo Surčin
- * Club domestic league appearances and goals as of 20:57, 19 December 2019 (UTC)

Milan Ćulum (Serbian Cyrillic: Милан Ћулум; born 28 October 1984) is a Serbian retired footballer who played as a defensive midfielder. A very tall player, he was known for a hard-tackling style of play, often resulting in yellow and red cards.

== Career ==
During his journeyman career, Ćulum played for numerous clubs in his homeland and abroad, including Cement Beočin, OFK Beograd, Srem (three brief loan spells), Spartak Subotica (loan), Čukarički, Smederevo, Željezničar (Bosnia and Herzegovina), Volgar Astrakhan (Russia), Hajduk Kula, Radnički Niš (two spells), Radnički Kragujevac, Radnik Surdulica, Rad, Sloboda Tuzla (Bosnia and Herzegovina), Partizani Tirana (Albania), Inter Zaprešić (Croatia), and Kolubara.

== Honours ==
Željezničar

- Bosnian Premier League: 2009–10
- Bosnian Cup: 2010–11

Borac Čačak

- Serbian League West: 2019–20
