= Jasir Selmani =

Macedonian footballer (born 1991)

Personal information
- Date of birth: 21 January 1991 (age 35)
- Place of birth: Tetovo, SFR Yugoslavia
- Height: 1.71 m (5 ft 7 in)
- Position: Attacking midfielder

Team information
- Current team: Renova
- Number: 28

Youth career
- 2003–2008: Shkëndija

Senior career*
Years	Team	Apps	(Gls)
2008–2015	Shkëndija	77	(9)
2011–2015	→ Drita (loan)		
2015	Vllaznia		
2015–2016	Renova	18	(0)
2016–2017	Ferizaj	17	(1)
2017	Follo FK	14	(1)
2018	Herlev IF	12	(0)
2019	Gostivari		
2019–2021	Renova	16	(1)
2021–	Voska Sport	0	(0)

International career
- Macedonia U15
- Macedonia U17
	Macedonia U19	3	(0)
2012–2013	Macedonia U21	2	(0)
- * Club domestic league appearances and goals as of 25 October 2019

Jasir Selmani (born 21 January 1991) is a Macedonian professional footballer who plays as an attacking midfielder for Renova.

== Club career ==
Selmani was born in Tetovo. He scored 87 goals in 112 games for the FK Shkëndija youth teams between 2003 and 2008 before being promoted to the first team for the 2008–09 season where he scored 9 goals in 11 games. He had an unsuccessful trial with Norwegian Tippeligaen side Tromsø IL in March 2009. He had an unsuccessful trial in August 2013 with Swedish side IS Halmia.

KF Gostivari announced on their official Facebook site on 21 January 2019, that they had signed Selmani.
