= Lynneeker =

Brazilian footballer

Personal information
- Full name: Lynneeker Nakamuta Paes de Albuquerque
- Date of birth: 11 January 1994 (age 32)
- Place of birth: Lapa, Brazil
- Height: 1.71 m (5 ft 7 in)
- Position: Forward

Team information
- Current team: Desportivo Brasil

Youth career
- Cruzeiro

Senior career*
| Years | Team | Apps | (Gls) |
| 2012–2015 | Cruzeiro | 0 | (0) |
| 2012–2013 | → ABC (loan) | 0 | (0) |
| 2015–2016 | Marítimo II | 3 | (1) |
| 2015–2016 | Marítimo | 4 | (0) |
| 2016–2017 | Flamurtari | 1 | (1) |
| 2017–2019 | Al-Hidd | | |
| 2019 | Capivariano | 13 | (2) |
| 2020 | Desportivo Brasil | 11 | (1) |
- * Club domestic league appearances and goals as of 13:22, 20 April 2020 (UTC)

Lynneeker Nakamuta Paes de Albuquerque (born 11 January 1994) is a Brazilian former professional footballer who played as a forward.

On 8 July 2015, Lynneeker signed with Marítimo.
