= Serginho (footballer, born April 1995) =

Brazilian footballer

Personal information
- Full name: Sérgio Antônio de Luiz Júnior
- Date of birth: 6 April 1995 (age 31)
- Place of birth: Belo Horizonte, Brazil
- Height: 1.80 m (5 ft 11 in)
- Position: Winger

Team information
- Current team: Atromitos
- Number: 70

Youth career
- Vitória

Senior career*
Years	Team	Apps	(Gls)
2015–2016	Hajvalia	15	(7)
2016–2020	Skënderbeu	13	(1)
2017	→ Laçi (loan)	17	(1)
2017–2018	→ Rabotnički (loan)	25	(5)
2018–2020	→ Shkupi (loan)	54	(14)
2020–2023	Giresunspor	89	(9)
2023–2025	Vasco da Gama	17	(2)
2024	→ Criciúma (loan)	3	(0)
2025–2026	Fatih Karagümrük	48	(9)
2026–	Atromitos	5	(2)
- * Club domestic league appearances and goals as of 3 November 2026

Sérgio Antônio de Luiz Júnior (born 6 April 1995), commonly known as Serginho, is a Brazilian professional footballer who plays as a winger for Super League Greece club Atromitos.

== Career ==
=== Hajvalia ===
Born in Belo Horizonte, Minas Gerais, Serginho was a Vitória youth graduate, before moving abroad in 2015 with Kosovar club KF Hajvalia. He scored seven goals in 15 league appearances during the 2015–16 season, as his side finished second.

=== Skënderbeu ===
On 10 August 2016, Serginho was presented at KF Skënderbeu Korçë in the Albanian Kategoria Superiore, after signing a three-year contract. The following 26 January, after being sparingly used, he was loaned to fellow league team KF Laçi until the end of the campaign.

On 22 August 2017, Serginho switched teams and countries again after joining Macedonian side FK Rabotnički on a one-year loan deal. Regularly used, he moved to fellow league team KF Shkupi on 27 June 2018, also in a temporary deal.

=== Giresunspor ===
On 20 August 2020, Serginho agreed to a permanent contract with TFF First League side Giresunspor. He helped the side to achieve promotion to the Süper Lig at the end of the season.

== Career statistics ==
As of 24 May 2023

Appearances and goals by club, season and competition
Club	Season	League			National Cup		Continental		Other		Total	
Club	Season	Division	Apps	Goals	Apps	Goals	Apps	Goals	Apps	Goals	Apps	Goals
Hajvalia	2015–16	Superleague of Kosovo	15	7	1	0	—		—		16	7
Skënderbeu	2016–17	Kategoria Superiore	13	1	3	2	—		1 (Note: Appearance(s) in Albanian Supercup)	0	17	3
Laçi (loan)	2016–17	Kategoria Superiore	17	1	2	0	—		—		19	1
Rabotnički (loan)	2017–18	Macedonian First League	25	5	0	0	—		—		25	5
Shkupi (loan)	2018–19	Macedonian First League	32	7	0	0	—		—		32	7
Shkupi (loan)	2019–20	Macedonian First League	22	7	1	0	2 (Note: Appearance(s) in UEFA Europa League)	0	—		25	7
Shkupi (loan)	Total		54	14	1	0	2	0	—		57	14
Giresunspor	2020–21	TFF First League	26	3	1	0	—		—		27	3
Giresunspor	2021–22	Süper Lig	35	4	1	0	—		—		36	4
Giresunspor	2022–23	Süper Lig	28	2	3	1	—		—		31	3
Giresunspor	Total		89	9	5	1	—		—		94	10
Career total			213	37	12	3	2	0	1	0	228	40
