= Miloš Rnić =

Serbian footballer

Personal information
- Date of birth: January 24, 1989 (age 37)
- Place of birth: Belgrade, SFR Yugoslavia
- Height: 1.78 m (5 ft 10 in)
- Position: Left-back

Team information
- Current team: Radnički Nova Pazova

Youth career
- 2005–2007: Radnički Nova Pazova

Senior career*
Years	Team	Apps	(Gls)
2007–2012	Radnički Nova Pazova	115	(6)
2012–2013	Novi Pazar	15	(0)
2013–2014	Minsk	34	(2)
2014–2015	Radnički Kragujevac	5	(0)
2015–2016	Metalac Gornji Milanovac	20	(0)
2016–2017	Flamurtari	18	(0)
2017	Radnički Pirot	10	(0)
2018	OFK Bačka	0	(0)
2019–2020	Smederevo 1924	11	(0)
2020–2021	Mačva B		
2021	Omladinac Novi Banovci		
2022	Radnički Nova Pazova		
- * Club domestic league appearances and goals as of 12:44, 8 January 2020 (UTC)

Miloš Rnić (Serbian Cyrillic: Милош Рнић; born 24 January 1989) is a Serbian footballer who last played for Radnički Nova Pazova.

== Career ==
Born in Belgrade, Rnić began his career in his native Serbia playing for FK Radnički Nova Pazova. He played in FK Radnički Nova Pazova in five season. In 2012, he moved to Novi Pazar playing in the Serbian SuperLiga. He made his debut in Serbian SuperLiga playing against FK Radnički Niš.
