= Dejvi Bilali =

Albanian professional footballer

Personal information
- Date of birth: 15 June 1996 (age 30)
- Place of birth: Elbasan, Albania
- Height: 1.76 m (5 ft 9 in)
- Position: Midfielder

Team information
- Current team: A.S.D. Massa Lombarda

Youth career
- Turbina Cërrik

Senior career*
Years	Team	Apps	(Gls)
2014–2015	Turbina		
2015–2016	Elbasani	19	(1)
2016–2017	Besa	21	(1)
2017–2018	Teuta	22	(0)
2018–2019	Vllaznia	16	(0)
2019–2020	Egnatia	19	(1)
2020	Vora	6	(0)
2021	Dinamo Tirana	13	(0)
2021–2022	Besa Kavajë	14	(0)
2022	Vëllaznimi	16	(0)
2023	AF Elbasani	14	(0)
2025	A.S.D. Massa Lombarda		
- * Club domestic league appearances and goals as of 21 February 2025

Dejvi Bilali (born 15 June 1996) is an Albanian professional footballer who plays as a midfielder. He currently plays for A.S.D Massa Lombarda in Italy.
