= Balša Radović =

Montenegrin footballer (born 1991)

Personal information
- Full name: Balša Radović
- Date of birth: 4 January 1991 (age 35)
- Place of birth: Podgorica, SFR Yugoslavia
- Height: 1.73 m (5 ft 8 in)
- Position: Midfielder

Team information
- Current team: FK Lovćen
- Number: 10

Youth career
- 2008–2009: Lovćen
- 2009–2010: Interblock

Senior career*
Years	Team	Apps	(Gls)
2009–2010	Interblock	1	(0)
2010–2014	Lovcen	94	(10)
2014–2015	Episkopi	11	(0)
2015–2016	Lovćen	28	(2)
2016–2017	Flamurtari	13	(1)
2017	Kom Podgorica	9	(0)
2018–2019	Luftëtari	12	(0)
2019–2020	Igalo		
2020–2021	Igalo		
2021	Mornar	11	(0)
2022	Grbalj		
2022–2023	Igalo		
2023–	Lovćen	33	(2)

International career
2009–2011	Montenegro U19	21	(2)
2011–2013	Montenegro U21	12	(3)
- * Club domestic league appearances and goals as of 4 April 2025

Balša Radović (born 4 January 1991) is a Montenegrin professional footballer who currently plays for FK Lovćen in the Montenegrin First League.

== Club career ==
In February 2019, Radović joined FK Arsenal Tivat in the Montenegrin Second League.
