= Giovanni La Camera =

Italian footballer

Personal information
- Date of birth: 29 December 1983 (age 42)
- Place of birth: Messina, Italy
- Height: 1.79 m (5 ft 10 1/2 in)
- Position: Midfielder

Team information
- Current team: Seregno

Youth career
- –2002: Messina

Senior career*
Years	Team	Apps	(Gls)
2002–2003	Rosarno		
2003–2004	Lupa Frascati		
2004–2005	Virtus Ortona		
2005–2006	Deruta		
2006–2007	Virtus Lanciano	26	(2)
2007–2009	Rimini	57	(5)
2009–2012	Benevento	84	(6)
2012–2013	Pavia	28	(3)
2013–2014	Cittadella	17	(0)
2014	Padova	9	(0)
2014–2015	Juve Stabia	35	(0)
2015–2016	Pavia	13	(0)
2016	Como	9	(0)
2016–2017	Lupa Roma	33	(2)
2017	Partizani Tirana	9	(0)
2018	Reggina	8	(0)
2018–	Seregno		
- * Club domestic league appearances and goals as of 6 May 2018

Giovanni La Camera (born 29 December 1983) is an Italian footballer who plays for Seregno.

== Club career ==
In January 2014, he was signed by Padova. In the summer of 2014, he left for Juve Stabia. On 4 June 2015, he was released.

In the summer of 2015, he was signed by Pavia. On 1 February 2016, he left for Serie B club Como.

On 22 August 2016, he was signed by Lupa Roma.

On 3 September 2018, he joined Seregno in Serie D.
