= Ivan Galić =

Croatian footballer

Personal information
- Full name: Ivan Galić
- Date of birth: 9 January 1995 (age 31)
- Place of birth: Slavonski Brod, Croatia
- Height: 1.76 m (5 ft 9 in)
- Position: Winger

Team information
- Current team: Graničar

Youth career
- 2006–2007: Graničar
- 2007–2009: Slavonac
- 2009–2010: Trnje
- 2010–2014: Lokomotiva

Senior career*
Years	Team	Apps	(Gls)
2013–2014	Rudeš	3	(0)
2014–2015	Istra 1961	0	(0)
2015	Vrapče	10	(1)
2015–2016	Lučko	19	(3)
2016	Rabotnički	11	(0)
2016–2017	Flamurtari	27	(3)
2017–2018	Cibalia	33	(7)
2018–2019	Laçi	0	(0)
2019–2021	Cibalia	38	(2)
2021-	NK Graničar Slavonski Šamac		
- * Club domestic league appearances and goals as of 22:09, 5 January 2020 (UTC)

Ivan Galić (born 9 January 1995) is a Croatian footballer who plays for amateur side NK Graničar Slavonski Šamac.

== Club career ==
Galić started off at a lower-tier club in Slavonski Šamac, moving on to NK Slavonac CO. At the age of 14, he moved to Zagreb and joined NK Trnje. A year after, he joined the NK Lokomotiva academy. At 18 years of age, he joined NK Rudeš for half a season, making his first senior appearances in the Druga HNL, before returning to NK Lokomotiva.

In June 2014, he signed a three-year contract with NK Istra 1961. After spending the first half of the season playing for the third-tier reserve team, Galić moved on to another third-tier team, NK Vrapče, where he played as a right back. Subsequently, Galić moved back to Druga HNL to NK Lučko, but his stay at the club echoed the previous ones, lasting for half a season before he moved abroad for the first time – to FK Rabotnički.

In the summer of 2016, he moved to Albania, signing a contract with Flamurtari Vlorë.
