= Maurício Leal =

Brazilian footballer

Personal information
- Full name: Maurício Aparecido Maciel Leal
- Date of birth: 11 June 1987 (age 39)
- Place of birth: Jandira, Brazil
- Height: 1.86 m (6 ft 1 in)
- Position: Centre-back

Team information
- Current team: Porto Velho
- Number: 44

Senior career*
Years	Team	Apps	(Gls)
2009–2011	Bragantino	7	(0)
2011–2012	Oeste	2	(0)
2013–2014	Grêmio Barueri	22	(2)
2015	Nacional-AM	8	(0)
2015–2016	Uniclinic	0	(0)
2016	Sriwijaya	30	(5)
2017	Flamurtari	11	(0)
2017	Persipura Jayapura	16	(0)
2018	Mitra Kukar	31	(4)
2020–	Porto Velho	21	(2)
- * Club domestic league appearances and goals as of 7 August 2021

Maurício Aparecido Maciel Leal (born 11 June 1987) simply known as Maurício Leal is a Brazilian footballer who plays as a centre-back for Campeonato Rondoniense club Porto Velho.
