= Ivan Nastevski =

Macedonian football midfielder (born 1991)

Personal information
- Full name: Ivan Nastevski; Иван Настевски
- Date of birth: 30 July 1991 (age 35)
- Place of birth: Skopje, SFR Yugoslavia
- Height: 1.73 m (5 ft 8 in)
- Position: Attacking midfielder

Team information
- Current team: Bregalnica Štip
- Number: 10

Senior career*
Years	Team	Apps	(Gls)
2009	Makedonija	8	(2)
2010–2011	Vardar	38	(5)
2011–2012	Rabotnički	24	(1)
2012–2013	Teteks	18	(1)
2013-2015	Ethnikos Gazoros	34	(7)
2015	Agrotikos	10	(1)
2015–2016	Novi Pazar	0	(0)
2016	Gorno Lisiče	0	(0)
2016	Olympiacos Volos	0	(0)
2017–2018	Makedonija	10+	(0)
2019	Kit-Go Pehčevo		
2019–	Bregalnica Štip		

International career
	Macedonia U19	1	(1)
2009	Macedonia U21	3	(0)
- * Club domestic league appearances and goals as of 00:19, 31 July 2019 (UTC)

Ivan Nastevski (Macedonian: Иван Настевски; born 30 July 1991) is a Macedonian football midfielder who plays for FK Bregalnica Štip.

== Career ==
In the summer 2019, Nastevski joined FK Bregalnica Štip.

== Honours ==
Teteks

- Macedonian Football Cup: 2013
