= Argjent Halili =

Albanian professional footballer (born 1982)

Personal information
- Full name: Argjent Halili
- Date of birth: 16 November 1982 (age 43)
- Place of birth: Vlorë, Albania
- Height: 1.88 m (6 ft 2 in)
- Position: Goalkeeper

Team information
- Current team: Labëria
- Number: 1

Youth career
- 1998–2001: Flamurtari Vlorë

Senior career*
Years	Team	Apps	(Gls)
2001–2002	Flamurtari	6	(0)
2002–2003	Teuta	10	(0)
2003–2004	Albpetrol	22	(0)
2004–2006	Teuta	20	(0)
2006–2007	Sopoti	28	(0)
2007–2010	Flamurtari	13	(0)
2010–2012	Kastrioti	52	(0)
2012–2015	Kukësi	84	(0)
2015–2017	Flamurtari	48	(0)
2017−2018	Kamza	15	(0)
2018−2019	Oriku	46	(0)
2019−	Labëria	84	(0)
- * Club domestic league appearances and goals as of 13 December 2018

Argjent Halili (born 16 November 1982) is an Albanian professional footballer who plays as a goalkeeper for Albanian club Oriku.

== Club career ==
=== Kukësi ===
Halili signed for Kukësi on 1 July 2012. He was released from the club on 16 June 2015 following the end of 2014–15 season.

=== Flamurtari Vlorë ===
On 13 July 2015, he returned to his first club Flamurtari Vlorë by signing a one-year deal. On 23 June 2016, he agreed a contract extension with the club, signing until June 2017. On 25 November, during the league match against Vllaznia Shkodër, Halili suffered an injury and was forced to leave the field in the last moments of the match, which finished in a 0–1 home defeat. After the match, it was reported that Halili had damaged his tendons and the thigh muscle, leaving him sidelined for eight weeks. On 26 June 2016, Halili left the club by terminating his contract by mutual consent.

=== Kamza ===
On 1 August 2017, Halili joined newly promoted side Kamza by penning a one-year contract. He was allocated squad number 1, and starter the season on 9 September in the opening matchday against Kukësi, conceding from an Elis Bakaj penalty as the match finished 1–0. He continued to be starting keeper afterwards. On 30 October, in the match against Laçi which was won 0–1, Halili wore the captain armband and was named the new captain after Sebino Plaku decided to hand over captaincy. The veteran left the club in the first days of January 2018.

=== Oriku ===
In July 2018, after spending the second part of 2017–18 season as a free agent, Halili along with his former teammate Taulant Kuqi agreed to join newly promoted Albanian First Division side Oriku.

== Career statistics ==
As of 22 December 2017

Club statistics
Club	Season	League			Cup		Europe		Total	
Club	Season	Division	Apps	Goals	Apps	Goals	Apps	Goals	Apps	Goals
Flamurtari Vlorë	2001–02	Albanian Superliga	6	0	0	0	—		6	0
Teuta Durrës	2002–03	Albanian Superliga	10	0	0	0	—		10	0
Albpetrol	2003–04	Albanian First Division	22	0	0	0	—		22	0
Teuta Durrës	2004–05	Albanian Superliga	10	0	0	0	—		10	0
Teuta Durrës	2005–06	Albanian Superliga	10	0	0	0	—		10	0
Teuta Durrës	Total		20	0	0	0	—		20	0
Sopoti Librazhd	2006–07	Albanian First Division	28	0	0	0	—		28	0
Flamurtari Vlorë	2007–08	Albanian Superliga	0	0	0	0	—		0	0
Flamurtari Vlorë	2008–09	Albanian Superliga	4	0	3	0	—		7	0
Flamurtari Vlorë	2009–10	Albanian Superliga	9	0	0	0	—		9	0
Flamurtari Vlorë	Total		13	0	3	0	—		16	0
Kastrioti Krujë	2010–11	Albanian Superliga	31	0	0	0	—		31	0
Kastrioti Krujë	2011–12	Albanian Superliga	21	0	5	0	—		26	0
Kastrioti Krujë	Total		52	0	5	0	—		57	0
Kukësi	2012–13	Albanian Superliga	25	0	9	0	—		34	0
Kukësi	2013–14	Albanian Superliga	28	0	6	0	8 (Note: All appearance(s) in UEFA Europa League)	0	42	0
Kukësi	2014–15	Albanian Superliga	31	0	3	0	2	0	36	0
Kukësi	Total		84	0	18	0	10	0	112	0
Flamurtari Vlorë	2015–16	Albanian Superliga	22	0	4	0	—		26	0
Flamurtari Vlorë	2016–17	Albanian Superliga	26	0	2	0	—		28	0
Flamurtari Vlorë	Total		48	0	6	0	—		54	0
Kamza	2017–18	Albanian Superliga	15	0	0	0	—		15	0
Oriku	2018–19	Albanian First Division	0	0	0	0	—		0	0
Career total			298	0	32	0	10	0	340	0

== Honours ==
Flamurtari Vlorë

- Albanian Cup: 2008–09
