= Nertil Hoxhaj =

Albanian footballer

Personal information
- Date of birth: 21 May 1997 (age 29)
- Place of birth: Fier, Albania
- Height: 1.82 m (6 ft 0 in)
- Position: Left back

Youth career
- 2011–2014: Tirana

Senior career*
Years	Team	Apps	(Gls)
2015–2016	Partizani	1	(0)
2016	Flamurtari	3	(0)
2017–2018	Bylis	18	(1)
2018–2019	Elbasani	24	(2)
2019–2020	Vushtrria	11	(1)
2020	Llapi	8	(0)
2020–2021	Vllaznia Shkodër	2	(0)
2021–2022	Besa Kavajë	14	(1)
2022	Turbina	14	(0)
2022–2023	Korabi Peshkopi	14	(0)
- * Club domestic league appearances and goals as of 19 May 2023

Nertil Hoxhaj (born 21 May 1997) is an Albanian football player who plays as a left back.

== Career ==
=== Early career ===
Although born in Fier, Hoxhaj began his youth career with KF Tirana as a child where he remained until 2011, which is when he moved to arch rivals Partizani Tirana to join the youth setup there. In his debut season with Partizani he was a member of the under-17 side, but was promoted to the under-19s the following year and he was also called up to the senior team by head coach Sulejman Starova to feature in an Albanian Cup fixture against Korabi Peshkopi. Hoxhaj made his professional debut in that match on 29 September 2015, coming on for fellow debutant Rigers Mersini at half time in the 2–0 loss for Partizani who fielded a mostly weakened side. Aside from the under-19s, he also played for the club's reserve side Partizani Tirana B in the Albanian Second Division, and was again called up for another Albanian Cup fixture on 21 October against KF Lushnja, where he came on as a 78th-minute substitute for Jurgen Bardhi in the 3–1 win for Partizani. Hoxhaj also featured in the return leg of the tie against KF Lushnja on 2 November, coming on at half time for Jovan Nikolić in the 3–0 win. He made his professional league debut with Partizani on the final day of the season on 18 May 2016 against Teuta Durrës at the Qemal Stafa Stadium, where he played the full 90 minutes in the 2–1 loss for his side.

== Career statistics ==
As of 19 May 2016

Club	Season	League			Cup		Continental (Note: Including continental competitions, such as UEFA Champions League and UEFA Europa League)		Other (Note: Including other competitions, such as Albanian Supercup)		Total	
Club	Season	Division	Apps	Goals	Apps	Goals	Apps	Goals	Apps	Goals	Apps	Goals
Partizani Tirana	2015–16	Albanian Superliga	1	0	3	0	—		—		4	0
Partizani Tirana	Total		1	0	3	0	—		—		4	0
Career total			1	0	3	0	0	0	0	0	4	0
