= Darlien Bajaziti =

Albanian footballer

Personal information
- Full name: Darlien Bajaziti
- Date of birth: 7 July 1994 (age 32)
- Place of birth: Kavajë, Albania
- Position: Forward

Team information
- Current team: Besa Kavajë

Youth career
- –2013: Besa Kavajë

Senior career*
Years	Team	Apps	(Gls)
2011–2016	Besa Kavajë	63	(9)
2011	Dinamo Tirana	1	(0)
2016–	Besa Kavajë	76	(10)
- * Club domestic league appearances and goals as of 26 March 2018

Darlien Bajaziti (born 7 July 1994) is an Albanian footballer who played as a forward for Besa Kavajë in the Albanian First Division. He is the son of former Albania international player Dashnor Bajaziti.
