= Konstantinos Georgakopoulos (footballer) =

Greek footballer

Personal information
- Full name: Konstantinos Georgakopoulos
- Date of birth: 24 February 1999 (age 27)
- Place of birth: Kalamata, Greece
- Position: Right-back

Team information
- Current team: Diavolitsi

Youth career
- –2017: Levadiakos
- 2017–2018: Apollon Smyrnis

Senior career*
Years	Team	Apps	(Gls)
2018	Panarkadikos		
2018–2019	Asteras Amaliadas	12	(2)
2019	Acharnaikos		
2019–2021	Apollon Larissa	2	(0)
2022–	Diavolitsi		
- * Club domestic league appearances and goals as of 18 May 2021

Konstantinos Georgakopoulos (Greek: Κωνσταντίνος Γεωργακόπουλος; born 24 February 1999) is a Greek professional footballer who plays as a right-back for Diavolitsi.
