= Masaki Iinuma =

Japanese footballer

Personal information
- Date of birth: 27 November 1992 (age 33)
- Place of birth: Gunma, Japan
- Position: Midfielder

Senior career*
Years	Team	Apps	(Gls)
2015	FK Mogren	12	(1)
2015–2017	FK Sutjeska Nikšić	6	(3)
2017	Flamurtari FC	1	(0)
2017	→ KF Sopoti (loan)	10	(2)
- * Club domestic league appearances and goals as of 17:04, 6 September 2020 (UTC)

Masaki Iinuma (', Iinuma Masaki; born 27 November 1992) is a former Japanese footballer.

== Career statistics ==
=== Club ===
Club	Season	League			Cup		Other		Total	
Club	Season	Division	Apps	Goals	Apps	Goals	Apps	Goals	Apps	Goals
FK Mogren	2014–15	1. CFL	12	1	0	0	2 (Note: Appearances in the Montenegrin First League playoffs)	0	14	1
FK Sutjeska Nikšić	2015–16	1. CFL	6	3	0	0	0	0	6	3
Flamurtari FC	2016–17	Kategoria Superiore	1	0	0	0	0	0	1	0
KF Sopoti (loan)	2016–17	Kategoria e Parë	10	2	0	0	1 (Note: Appearances in the Kategoria e Parë playoffs)	0	11	2
Career total			29	6	0	0	3	0	32	6
