= Alessio Hyseni =

Albanian professional footballer (born 1997)

Personal information
- Full name: Alessio Hyseni
- Date of birth: 4 January 1997 (age 29)
- Place of birth: Castiglione del Lago, Italy
- Height: 1.86 m (6 ft 1 in)
- Position: Midfielder

Team information
- Current team: Ovidiana Sulmona
- Number: 6

Youth career
- 2011–2016: Perugia

Senior career*
Years	Team	Apps	(Gls)
2015–2016	Gavorrano	9	(1)
2016–2019	Flamurtari	44	(0)
2019–	Partizani	1	(0)
2020–	→ KÍ Klaksvík (loan)	4	(0)
2020-2021	KF Bylis		
2021-2022	Lanciano Calcio		
2022	Avezzano Calcio		
2022-	Ovidiana Sulmona		

International career
2013–2014	Albania U17	6	(0)
2014–2015	Albania U19	1	(1)
- * Club domestic league appearances and goals as of 29 May 2020

Alessio Hyseni (born 4 January 1997) is an Albanian footballer who plays as a midfielder for Italian club Ovidiana Sulmona.

== Club career ==
=== Early career ===
Hyseni started his youth career at A.C. Perugia. In 2014, he gained entry at the primavera team and in the 2014–15 season he scored 4 goals in 14 games. On 25 August 2015 Perugia loaned him to Serie D side U.S. Gavorrano. He was planned to stay at Gavorrano until the end of the season but after 9 appearances and 1 goal, on 6 February 2016 he resolved his contract with the club and returned to Perugia.

=== Flamurtari Vlorë ===
On 31 August 2016 Hyseni signed with Flamurtari Vlorë. He played initially with Flamurtari Vlorë B, where he debuted with "Red and blacks" on 14 December 2016 in the Albanian Third Division against Sopoti Librazhd B playing the full 90-minutes match.

In the first half of the 2018–19 season, Hyseni found more space to play under Ilir Daja, collecting 14 league appearances and also providing 4 assists, joint fourth highest in the league. However, on 4 January, the club announced that they had terminated the contract with the player, thus leaving him a free agent at the day of his 21st birthday.

=== Partizani Tirana ===
On 4 January 2019, on the same day, Hyseni was announced as the new player of Partizani Tirnana, penning an 18-month contract with an option to renew.

== International career ==
Hyseni was initially part of Albania under-17 side where he was invited by coach Dzemal Mustedanagić to participate in the qualifying round of the 2014 UEFA European Under-17 Championship in October 2013. Hyseni played as a starter in the opening match of Group 1 against Romania on 18 October 2013; he was substituted off in the 72nd minute for Arlind Demaj as the match was lost 1–0.

Then in the next two matches Hyseni played both as full 80-minutes as Albania defeated Belarus 2–1 and took a goalless draw against Finland, which were enough to clinch a spot into the elite round. He continued to be part of the team in the elite round in March 2014. In the first match against Italy on 26 March 2014, Hyseni played as a starter and was substituted off in the 63rd minute for Amarildo Gjoka as the team lost 2–1 despite scoring first with Keidi Bare in the 14th minute. Then he played two other matches as full 80-minutes as Albania U17 lost at both and got eliminated from tournament.

He advanced at the under-19 team as he was invited by coach Altin Lala to participate in the Friendly Tournament Roma Caput Mundi in Rome, Italy between 8–13 March 2015 against Malta, Wales and Italy. He was able to score in his debut against Italy on 12 March, netting the opener as the team won 2–0.

== Career statistics ==
As of 21 December 2018

Club statistics
Club	Season	League			Cup		Continental		Other		Total	
Club	Season	Division	Apps	Goals	Apps	Goals	Apps	Goals	Apps	Goals	Apps	Goals
Gavorrano	2015–16	Serie D	9	1	0	0	—		—		9	1
Flamurtari Vlorë	2016–17	Albanian Superliga	15	0	2	0	—		—		17	0
Flamurtari Vlorë	2017–18	Albanian Superliga	15	0	4	2	—		—		19	2
Flamurtari Vlorë	2018–19	Albanian Superliga	14	0	2	0	—		—		16	0
Flamurtari Vlorë	Total		44	0	8	2	—		—		52	2
Partizani Tirana	2018–19	Albanian Superliga	0	0	0	0	—		—		0	0
Partizani Tirana	2019–20	Albanian Superliga	1	0	0	0	—		—		1	0
Partizani Tirana	Total		1	0	0	0	—		—		1	0
Career total			54	1	8	2	0	0	0	0	62	3
