= Kejvi Bardhi =

Albanian footballer

Personal information
- Date of birth: 7 August 1996 (age 30)
- Place of birth: Laç, Albania
- Height: 1.82 m (6 ft 0 in)
- Position: Forward

Youth career
- 2012–2015: Laçi
- 2015: → Elbasani (loan)

Senior career*
Years	Team	Apps	(Gls)
2013–2018	Laçi	31	(0)
2015	→ Elbasani (loan)	2	(0)
- * Club domestic league appearances and goals

Kejvi Bardhi (born 7 August 1996) is an Albanian former football player.

== Controversies ==
In October 2016, Bardhi was arrested after he was accused of causing a collision of three cars including a police car on a crossroads between Laç and Fushë Krujë. Bardhi was reportedly driving too fast and the accident left three people injured. In 2017, he allegedly posted a picture of himself on social media while driving a car with a gun on his lap.

== Personal life ==
Kejvi is a son of Kurbin mayor Arthur Bardhi.
