= Fisnik Zuka =

Macedonian association football player

Personal information
- Full name: Fisnik Zuka
- Date of birth: 3 September 1995 (age 31)
- Place of birth: Skopje, Macedonia
- Height: 1.75 m (5 ft 9 in)
- Position: Left back

Team information
- Current team: Arsimi
- Number: 4

Senior career*
Years	Team	Apps	(Gls)
2014–2017	Shkupi	64	(1)
2018	Flamurtari	13	(0)
2018–2020	Renova	53	(0)
2020–2021	Rabotnički	18	(0)
2021	Shkupi	2	(0)
2022	Renova	13	(0)
2022–2023	Makedonija GP	15	(0)
2023–2025	Gostivari	45	(1)
2025–2026	Bashkimi	26	(0)
2026–	Arsimi	5	(0)
- * Club domestic league appearances and goals as of 15 September 2026

Fisnik Zuka (born 3 September 1995) is a Macedonian footballer of Albanian descent who plays for Bashkimi in the Macedonian First Football League.

== Club career ==
=== Shkupi ===
Zuka started his senior career with the club. He made his First League debut for the club on 9 August 2015 in a 2–2 away draw with Vardar, coming on as a 90th-minute substitute for Ardian Nuhiu. He scored his first goal in the Macedonian top flight on 16 November 2016 in a 1–1 home draw with FK Pobeda. His goal, scored in the 24th minute, made the score 1–0 to Shkupi.

=== Flamurtari ===
In January 2018, Zuka moved to Albanian Superliga club Flamurtari Vlorë. He made his competitive debut for the club on 26 January 2018 in a 1–0 victory in the league over Partizani Tirana, coming on as a 65th-minute substitute for Ardit Hoxhaj.

=== Renova ===
In July 2018, Zuka moved back to Macedonia, signing with First League club FK Renova. He made his competitive debut for the club on 11 August 2018 in a 4–3 away victory over FK Rabotnički, playing all ninety minutes of the match.
