= Arbër Çyrbja =

Albanian footballer (born 1993)

Personal information
- Date of birth: 18 September 1993 (age 33)
- Place of birth: Shijak, Albania
- Height: 1.78 m (5 ft 10 in)
- Position: Midfielder

Team information
- Current team: Kukësi
- Number: 20

Youth career
- 2011–2012: Teuta Durrës

Senior career*
Years	Team	Apps	(Gls)
2012–2018	Teuta Durrës	101	(13)
2014	→ Erzeni (loan)	9	(2)
2015	→ Elbasani (loan)	7	(0)
2018–2019	Kukësi	33	(0)
2019–2020	Teuta Durrës	24	(2)
2020–2021	Gjilani	21	(2)
2021	Egnatia	14	(0)
2022	Erzeni	6	(0)
2022–2023	Teuta Durrës	25	(0)
2023	Dukagjini	9	(0)
2024–2026	Teuta Durrës	19	(0)
2026–	Kukësi	0	(0)

International career
2011–2012	Albania U17	2	(0)
- * Club domestic league appearances and goals as of 25 March 2024

Arbër Çyrbja (born 18 September 1993) is an Albanian professional footballer who plays as a midfielder for Kukësi.

== Club career ==
Born in Shijak, Çyrbja started his career with Teuta Durrës, where in 2011 he joined the under-19 side and scored 7 goals in 19 games as a right midfielder during the 2011–12 season. During the second half of the season he was invited to train with the senior side and was included in the senior team's Albanian Cup side.

He joined Albanian Second Division side Erzeni in September 2014 where he played 9 games and scored twice before moving back to the Albanian Superliga with Elbasani in January 2015.

Çyrbja returned to his boyhood club Teuta Durrës in July 2015 after only half season at Elbasani. He served as captain in the 2017–18 season, in which he played 34 league games and scored 7 goals, a new personal best.

On 23 June 2018, Kukësi announced to have signed Çyrbja ona two-year deal for a reported fee of €50,000. He deal also included an additional €50,000 to Teuta Durrës if Kukësi manages to sell the player to a foreign club.

== International career ==
A former Albania youth international, Çyrbja has represented under-17 side, making two appearances.

== Career statistics ==
As of 29 May 2023

Club statistics
Club	Season	League			Cup		Europe		Total	
Club	Season	Division	Apps	Goals	Apps	Goals	Apps	Goals	Apps	Goals
Teuta Durrës	2012–13	Albanian Superliga	4	0	1	0	—		5	0
Teuta Durrës	2013–14	Albanian Superliga	11	0	4	2	2 (Note: Appearances in UEFA Europa League)	0	17	2
Teuta Durrës	2015–16	Albanian Superliga	23	1	2	0	—		25	1
Teuta Durrës	2016–17	Albanian Superliga	29	5	7	1	2	0	38	6
Teuta Durrës	2017–18	Albanian Superliga	34	7	6	0	—		40	7
Teuta Durrës	Total		101	13	20	3	4	0	125	16
Erzeni (loan)	2014–15	Albanian Second Division	9	2	0	0	—		9	2
Elbasani (loan)	2014–15	Albanian First Division	7	0	0	0	—		7	0
Kukësi	2018–19	Albanian Superliga	33	0	8	0	6 (Note: Four appearances in UEFA Champions League, two appearances in UEFA Europa League)	0	47	0
Kukësi	2019–20	Albanian Superliga	0	0	0	0	2	0	2	0
Kukësi	Total		33	0	8	0	8	0	49	0
Teuta Durrës	2019–20	Albanian Superliga	24	2	4	0	—		28	2
Gjilani	2020–21	Kosovo Superliga	21	0	0	0	—		21	0
Egnatia	2021–22	Albanian Superliga	14	0	2	0	—		16	0
Erzeni	2021–22	Albanian First Division	6	0	0	0	—		6	0
Teuta Durrës	2022–23	Albanian Superliga	25	0	7	0	—		32	0
Career total			240	17	41	3	12	0	293	20

== Honours ==
=== Club ===
Kukësi

- Albanian Cup: 2018–19

Teuta Durrës

- Albanian Cup: 2019–20
