= Arbri Beqaj =

Albanian footballer

Personal information
- Date of birth: 29 September 1998 (age 28)
- Place of birth: Selenicë, Vlorë, Albania
- Height: 1.78 m (5 ft 10 in)
- Position: Right back

Team information
- Current team: Oriku
- Number: 18

Youth career
- 2011–2012: Vlora
- 2012–2015: Flamurtari

Senior career*
Years	Team	Apps	(Gls)
2013–2017	Flamurtari	23	(0)
2017	Teuta	6	(0)
2018	Laçi	1	(0)
2018–2019	Flamurtari	18	(0)
2021–	Oriku	3	(0)
- * Club domestic league appearances and goals as of 23:15, 7 August 2021 (UTC)

Arbri Beqaj (born 29 September 1998) is an Albanian professional footballer who plays as a right back for KF Oriku.

== Club career ==
=== Flamurtari Vlorë ===
A graduate of the Flamurtari youth academy, Beqaj made his league debut for the club on 22 December 2013 in a 1–0 away victory over Partizani Tirana. He was subbed on for Hair Zeqiri in the 87th minute.

=== Teuta Durrës ===
In July 2017, Beqaj moved to Albanian Superliga club KF Teuta Durrës on a free transfer. He made his league debut for the club on 12 October 2017 in a 2–1 home loss against Partizani Tirana. He was subbed on for Esin Hakaj in the 85th minute.

=== Laçi ===
In January 2018, Beqaj moved again, this time to Laçi in the Albanian Superliga. He made his league debut for the club on 26 January 2018 in a 3–1 away loss against Kamza. He was subbed on for Ndriçim Shtubina in the 61st minute.

== International career ==
=== Albania U19 ===
Beqaj was called up at Albania national under-19 football team by coach Arjan Bellaj in the pre-eleminary squad for the 2017 UEFA European Under-19 Championship qualification from 6–11 October 2016. He then received a call up to the Albania under-19 by same coach Arjan Bellaj for the friendly tournament Roma Caput Mundi from 29 February–4 March 2016.

== Career statistics ==
=== Club ===
As of 10 December 2017

Club statistics
Club	Season	League			Cup		Europe (Note: Including continental competitions, such as UEFA Champions League and UEFA Europa League)		Other		Total	
Club	Season	Division	Apps	Goals	Apps	Goals	Apps	Goals	Apps	Goals	Apps	Goals
Flamurtari Vlorë	2013–14	Albanian Superliga	1	0	—		—		—		1	0
Flamurtari Vlorë	2014–15	Albanian Superliga	1	0	—		—		—		1	0
Flamurtari Vlorë	2015–16	Albanian Superliga	6	0	1	0	—		—		7	0
Flamurtari Vlorë	2016–17	Albanian Superliga	15	0	1	0	—		—		16	0
Flamurtari Vlorë	Total		23	0	2	0	—		—		25	0
Teuta Durrës	2017–18	Albanian Superliga	6	0	2	0	—		—		8	0
Career total			29	0	4	0	—		—		33	0
