= Taulant Kuqi =

Albanian footballer

Personal information
- Full name: Taulant Kuqi
- Date of birth: 11 November 1985 (age 40)
- Place of birth: Vlorë, Albania
- Height: 1.82 m (6 ft 0 in)
- Position: Midfielder

Team information
- Current team: Oriku
- Number: 20

Youth career
- 2002–2006: Flamurtari Vlorë

Senior career*
Years	Team	Apps	(Gls)
2006–2017	Flamurtari	255	(4)
2017–2018	Kamza	31	(0)
2018–	Oriku	33	(3)
- * Club domestic league appearances and goals as of 13 December 2019

Taulant Kuqi (born 11 November 1985 in Vlorë) is an Albanian professional footballer who plays as a midfielder for Oriku in the Albanian First Division.

== Club career ==
A Flamurtari Vlorë product, Kuqi debuted during 2005–06 season and since then played more than 250 league appearances, notably winning the Albanian Cup twice. On 22 July 2012, Kuqi agreed a contract extension, signing until June 2013.

He left the club after 15 years in June 2017.

After two months of negotiations, on 1 September 2017, Kuqi agreed personal terms and joined newly promoted side Kazma. Prior to that, he had a failed move to Albanian First Division's Bylis Ballsh. He was a regular starter in the team during the 2017–18 season in which Kamza escaped relegation by only winning in the final match, with Kuqi collecting 2313 minutes from 31 appearances.

In July 2018, Kuqi along with Argjent Halili joined newly promoted Albanian First Division side Oriku.

== Career statistics ==
As of 23 May 2018

Club statistics
Club	Season	League			Cup		Europe		Other		Total	
Club	Season	Division	Apps	Goals	Apps	Goals	Apps	Goals	Apps	Goals	Apps	Goals
Flamurtari Vlorë	2005–06	Albanian Superliga	0	0	0	0	—		—		0	0
Flamurtari Vlorë	2006–07	Albanian Superliga	16	1	0	0	—		—		16	1
Flamurtari Vlorë	2007–08	Albanian Superliga	20	0	0	0	—		—		20	0
Flamurtari Vlorë	2008–09	Albanian Superliga	26	2	4	0	—		—		30	2
Flamurtari Vlorë	2009–10	Albanian Superliga	26	0	0	0	0	0	0	0	26	0
Flamurtari Vlorë	2010–11	Albanian Superliga	21	0	3	0	—		—		24	0
Flamurtari Vlorë	2011–12	Albanian Superliga	18	0	14	1	4 (Note: All appearance(s) in UEFA Europa League)	0	—		36	1
Flamurtari Vlorë	2012–13	Albanian Superliga	19	0	7	0	2	0	—		28	0
Flamurtari Vlorë	2013–14	Albanian Superliga	31	1	6	0	—		—		37	1
Flamurtari Vlorë	2014–15	Albanian Superliga	26	0	5	0	4	1	1 (Note: Appearance in Albanian Supercup)	0	36	1
Flamurtari Vlorë	2015–16	Albanian Superliga	25	0	4	0	—		—		29	0
Flamurtari Vlorë	2016–17	Albanian Superliga	27	0	4	1	—		—		31	1
Flamurtari Vlorë	Total		255	4	47	1	10	1	1	0	313	6
Kamza	2017–18	Albanian Superliga	31	0	3	0	—		—		34	0
Oriku	2017–18	Albanian First Division	0	0	0	0	—		—		0	0
Career total			286	6	50	1	10	1	1	0	346	6

== Honours ==
Flamurtari Vlorë

- Albanian Cup: 2008–09, 2013–14
