= Bruno Lipi =

Albanian footballer

Personal information
- Date of birth: 7 April 1994 (age 32)
- Place of birth: Albania
- Position: Midfielder

Team information
- Current team: Diagoras Vrachneikon

Youth career
- Ergotelis

Senior career*
Years	Team	Apps	(Gls)
2015–2016	Bylis	1	(0)
2016–2017	Laçi	10	(0)
2017	Turbina	6	(2)
2017	Kallithea		
2018–	Diagoras Vrachneikon		
- * Club domestic league appearances and goals as of 3 January 2018

Bruno Lipi (born 7 April 1994) is an Albanian footballer who plays for A.O. Diagoras Vrachneikon 1960 in Greece as a midfielder.
