= Ivan Jakovljević =

Serbian footballer

Personal information
- Full name: Ivan Jakovljević
- Date of birth: 26 May 1989 (age 37)
- Place of birth: Pristina, SFR Yugoslavia
- Height: 1.86 m (6 ft 1 in)
- Position: Right-back

Senior career*
Years	Team	Apps	(Gls)
–2011	ČSK Čelarevo		
2011–2013	Zvijezda Gradačac	40	(1)
2013–2014	SZTK	37	(0)
2014–2015	Zvijezda Gradačac	10	(0)
2015–2017	Radnik Bijeljina	56	(1)
2017–2018	Flamurtari Vlorë	32	(0)
2018–2019	Luftëtari Gjirokastër	17	(0)
2020-	Vuteks-Sloga		
- * Club domestic league appearances and goals as of 14:38, 09 December 2022 (UTC)

Ivan Jakovljević (Serbian Cyrillic: Иван Јаковљевић, born 26 May 1989) is a Serbian footballer who plays for NK Vuteks-Sloga Vukovar. His preferred position is right back, where he has played throughout his career.

== Honours ==
Radnik Bijeljina

- Bosnia and Herzegovina Football Cup: 2015–16
