= Franc Veliu =

Albanian footballer

Personal information
- Date of birth: 11 November 1988 (age 37)
- Place of birth: Vlorë, Albania
- Height: 1.86 m (6 ft 1 in)
- Position: Defender

Youth career
- 2003–2006: Flamurtari

Senior career*
Years	Team	Apps	(Gls)
2006–2015	Flamurtari	210	(14)
2015–2016	Kukësi	8	(0)
2016	Partizani	3	(0)
2016–2019	Flamurtari	66	(3)
2019–2022	Gjilani	48	(4)

International career
2008–2009	Albania U21	8	(0)
2009–2013	Albania	7	(0)
- * Club domestic league appearances and goals

Franc Veliu (born 11 November 1988) is an Albanian former professional footballer who played mainly as a defender. His natural position is left back but he has also played as a left midfielder and even as a central defender.

He only played for one club team at professional level between 2006 and 2015, before joining Kukësi in 2015. He has only ever won two trophies in his career so far, two times Albanian Cup in 2009 and 2014 after winning in the final against Tirana and against current club Kukësi in 2009 and 2014 respectively.

== Club career ==
=== Flamurtari Vlorë ===
He made his debut for Flamurtari Vlorë in 2006 and since then has cemented his place in his hometown club's first team. He has spent most of his career in the left back position but he has also played as a left midfielder and most recently as a central defender as well. On 29 October 2008, he scored his first hat-trick, an unusual achievement for a defender, in a 1–6 away win against Naftëtari Kuçovë valid for the first leg of the first round of 2008–09 Albanian Cup.

He was voted Flamurtari's player of the year for 2014 by the club's fans, beating Bruno Telushi and Ardit Shehaj who came second and third respectively.

=== Kukësi ===
After making 263 appearances for Flamurtari between 2006 and 2015, Veliu left to join fellow Albanian Superliga club Kukësi.

=== Partizani Tirana ===
On 1 February 2016, Veliu joined Partizani Tirana where he signed a contract until the end of the season with an option to extend it for a further year. After some matches in bench, Veliu made his first appearance with Red Bulls on 20 March by playing in the last 13 minutes of a 0–2 win at Teuta Durrës. He played his first match as starter later on 17 April in the 3–0 home win over Vllaznia Shkodër; he was however replace at the end of first half. Veliu left the club following the end of the season after making only three appearances, collecting only 80 minutes as the team finished runner-up in the championship.

=== Return to Flamurtari Vlorë ===
On 22 July 2016, Veliu officially returned to Flamurtari Vlorë by joining as a free agent. He was allocated his old squad number 11, and made his return debut on 7 September in the opening league match of the season, a 2–1 away defeat to Skënderbeu Korçë. On 27 May, in the final matchday, Veliu scored his first goal of the season after an individual effort in a 3–0 win over Korabi Peshkopi, as Flamurtari avoided the relegation by just one point. In June, following the departure of team captain Bruno Telushi in Croatia, Veliu was renamed the new captain, three years after losing the status. He suffered a major injury during the summer preparation phase which forced him to miss the entire first half of 2017–18 season. On 22 July 2017, Veliu signed a contract running until July 2018. He returned on action in the first days of January 2018 where he played in a friendly against the under-19 side.

=== Gjilani ===
In summer 2019, Veliu moved abroad to play for Football Superleague of Kosovo side Gjilani.

== International career ==
Veliu was selected by Josip Kuže for a friendly against Argentina on 20 June 2011. He was in the starting line up on his debut in a game which ended in a 4–0 loss.

== Personal life ==
Veliu was arrested on 25 October 2015 for drunk driving. His vehicle was confiscated, and Veliu was jailed for one month.

== Career statistics ==
=== Club ===
As of 1 February 2016

Club performance			League		Cup		Continental (Note: Including continental competitions, such as UEFA Champions League and UEFA Europa League)		Other (Note: Including other competitions, such as Albanian Supercup)		Total	
Season	Club	League	Apps	Goals	Apps	Goals	Apps	Goals	Apps	Goals	Apps	Goals
Flamurtari Vlorë			League		Albanian Cup		Europe		Other		Total	
2006–06	Flamurtari Vlorë	Albanian Superliga	8	1	?	?	–		0	0	8	1
2008–08	Flamurtari Vlorë	Albanian Superliga	24	2	?	?	—		—		24	2
2008–09	Flamurtari Vlorë	Albanian Superliga	29	2	7	3	—		—		36	5
2009–10	Flamurtari Vlorë	Albanian Superliga	32	3	0	0	2	0	1	0	35	3
2010–11	Flamurtari Vlorë	Albanian Superliga	30	1	4	0	—		—		34	1
2011–12	Flamurtari Vlorë	Albanian Superliga	24	3	12	3	4	0	—		40	6
2012–13	Flamurtari Vlorë	Albanian Superliga	24	1	8	3	2	0	—		34	4
2013–14	Flamurtari Vlorë	Albanian Superliga	21	1	5	0	—		—		26	1
2014–15	Flamurtari Vlorë	Albanian Superliga	18	0	4	0	3	1	1	0	26	1
Total	Flamurtari Vlorë		210	14	40	9	11	1	2	0	263	24
Kukësi			League		Albanian Cup		Europe		Other		Total	
2015–16	Kukësi	Albanian Superliga	8	0	4	0	—		—		12	0
Total	Kukësi		8	0	4	0	—		—		12	0
Career total			218	14	44	9	11	1	2	0	275	24

=== International ===
As of 1 February 2016

Albania national team
Year	Apps	Goals
2011	3	0
2012	3	0
2013	1	0
Total	7	0

== Honours ==
=== Club ===
Flamurtari Vlorë

- Albanian Cup: 2008–09, 2013–14

=== Individual ===
- Albanian Superliga Player of the Month: November 2010
