= Milan Basrak =

Swiss footballer

Personal information
- Date of birth: 24 December 1994 (age 31)
- Place of birth: St. Gallen, Switzerland
- Height: 1.81 m (5 ft 11 in)
- Position: Centre-forward

Team information
- Current team: OFK Petrovac
- Number: 99

Youth career
- 2007–2011: Zemun
- 2011: Vojvodina
- 2012: Red Star Belgrade

Senior career*
| Years | Team | Apps | (Gls) |
| 2010–2011 | Zemun | 1 | (1) |
| 2011 | Vojvodina | 0 | (0) |
| 2012 | Red Star Belgrade | 0 | (0) |
| 2012 | → Sopot (loan) | 8 | (0) |
| 2013 | Mačva Šabac | 3 | (0) |
| 2013 | → Smederevo (loan) | 0 | (0) |
| 2014 | Inđija | 1 | (0) |
| 2014 | Radnik Bijeljina | 11 | (0) |
| 2015 | Radnički Lukavac | 11 | (4) |
| 2015 | Metalac G.M. | 2 | (0) |
| 2016–2017 | Catanzaro | 24 | (4) |
| 2017 | Partizani Tirana | 4 | (1) |
| 2018 | Napredak Kruševac | 6 | (0) |
| 2018 | Birkirkara | 5 | (0) |
| 2019 | Tatran Prešov | 10 | (0) |
| 2019 | Smederevo 1924 | 16 | (7) |
| 2020 | Akademija Pandev | 0 | (0) |
| 2021 | Jagodina | 12 | (5) |
| 2021–2022 | Budućnost Dobanovci | 6 | (1) |
| 2022 | Lavello | 20 | (1) |
| 2022–2023 | Sloga Meridian Doboj | 11 | (1) |
| 2023 | Termoli | 8 | (0) |
| 2024– | OFK Petrovac | 6 | (1) |
- * Club domestic league appearances and goals as of 29 May 2024

Milan Basrak (Serbian Cyrillic: Милан Басрак; born 24 December 1994) is a Swiss professional footballer who plays as a forward for OFK Petrovac.

== Club career ==
Born in St. Gallen, Basrak was a member of Zemun, Vojvodina, and Red Star Belgrade youth teams. He made his senior debut for Zemun in the last fixture of 2010–11 Serbian First League, against Novi Pazar, and scored an only goal for Zemun on that match. Later he was with Vojvodina and Red Star Belgrade, where from he left to football club from Sopot. In 2013–14 Serbian First League, he also made 1 appearance for Inđija in the Serbian First League. Season 2014–15 he spent in Bosnia and Herzegovina, where he played for Radnik Bijeljina and Radnički Lukavac. In summer 2015, he joined Metalac Gornji Milanovac. In summer 2016 he moved to Italy and signed with U.S. Catanzaro 1929, scoring 4 goals in 24 matches for the 2016–17 Lega Pro campaign. He also played with Partizani Tirana in the Albanian Superliga in late 2017.

Basrak signed with Birkirkara in Malta in August 2017, but was released again in the beginning of January 2019.

On 21 January 2022, Basrak moved to Italy to join Serie D club Lavello. He successively left Lavello for Sloga Meridian.

== Career statistics ==
As of 8 November 2015

| Club performance | | | League | | Cup | | Continental | | Total | |
| Season | Club | League | Apps | Goals | Apps | Goals | Apps | Goals | Apps | Goals |
| Serbia | | | League | | Serbian Cup | | Europe | | Total | |
|---|---|---|---|---|---|---|---|---|---|---|
| 2010–11 | Zemun | First League | 1 | 1 | – | | | | 1 | 1 |
| 2013–14 | Inđija | First League | 1 | 0 | – | | | | 1 | 0 |
| Bosnia and Herzegovina | | | League | | Bosnian Cup | | Europe | | Total | |
| 2014–15 | Radnik Bijeljina | Premijer liga | 11 | 0 | 1 | 0 | – | | 12 | 0 |
| 2014–15 | Radnički Lukavac | First League of BiH | 11 | 4 | – | | | | 11 | 4 |
| Serbia | | | League | | Serbian Cup | | Europe | | Total | |
| 2015–16 | Metalac | SuperLiga | 2 | 0 | 1 | 0 | – | | 3 | 0 |
| Total | Serbia | | 4 | 1 | 1 | 0 | 0 | 0 | 5 | 1 |
| Total | Bosnia and Herzegovina | | 22 | 4 | 1 | 0 | 0 | 0 | 23 | 4 |
| Career total | | | 26 | 5 | 1 | 0 | 0 | 0 | 27 | 5 |
