= Eric Herrera =

Panamanian footballer (born 1992)

Personal information
- Full name: Eric Orlando Quintero Herrera
- Date of birth: 16 February 1992 (age 34)
- Place of birth: Panama
- Height: 1.68 m (5 ft 6 in)
- Position: Midfielder

Team information
- Current team: Cassino

Youth career
- Treviso
- Parma
- Hellas Verona

Senior career*
Years	Team	Apps	(Gls)
2010–2011	Pordenone	29	(4)
2011–2014	Avellino	35	(2)
2014	→ Rimini (loan)	8	(0)
2014–2015	Paganese	19	(3)
2015–2017	Lecce	12	(1)
2015–2016	→ Melfi (loan)	24	(6)
2016–2017	→ Paganese (loan)	23	(2)
2017	Partizani Tirana	4	(0)
2017–2018	Audace Cerignola	10	(1)
2018	Sangiustese	12	(6)
2018–2020	Sorrento	40	(15)
2020–2021	Lavello	23	(2)
2021–2022	Fano	13	(2)
2022–2023	Sorrento	31	(2)
2023–2024	Angri	28	(1)
2024–2025	Cassino	32	(3)
2025	Pompei	2	(0)
2025–2026	Orvietana	14	(1)
2026–	Cassino	0	(0)
- * Club domestic league appearances and goals as of 1 March 2026

Eric Orlando Quintero Herrera (born 16 February 1992) is a Panamanian footballer who plays as a midfielder for Serie D Italian club Cassino.

== Club career ==
Herrera played for Treviso, Parma and Hellas Verona youth teams before joining Pordenone. On 7 August 2011, Herrera scored a brace in his Coppa Italia debut for Avellino in a first round match against Portogruaro, leading them to a 3–0 victory.

In June 2012 he signed a new 3-year contract with club. He was loaned to Rimini in January 2014 and after six months at Paganese he moved to Lecce in January 2015.
