= Taulant Sefgjinaj =

Albanian footballer

Personal information
- Date of birth: 21 July 1986 (age 40)
- Place of birth: Laç, Albania
- Height: 1.77 m (5 ft 10 in)
- Position: Defender

Senior career*
Years	Team	Apps	(Gls)
2005–2010	Laçi		
2010–2011	Teuta Durrës	20	(0)
2011–2016	Laçi	128	(3)
2016–2017	Erzeni	12	(0)
2017–2019	Laçi	71	(1)
2019–2020	Kastrioti	22	(0)
2020–2021	Burreli	18	(0)
2021–2022	Korabi	23	(0)
2022–2023	Valbona		
2023	Iliria		
- * Club domestic league appearances and goals

Taulant Sefgjinaj (born 21 July 1986) is an Albanian former football player. He played as a defender whose main position was left back.

== Honours ==
Laçi

- Albanian Cup: 2012–13, 2014–15
