= 2016–17 KF Tirana season =

KF Tirana
2016–17 season
- President: Refik Halili
- Head coach: Ilir Daja (until 2 November 2016); Mirel Josa (from 2 November 2016)
- Stadium: Selman Stërmasi Stadium
- Kategoria Superiore: 9th
- Albanian Cup: Winners
- Top goalscorer: League: Afrim Taku (9); All: Afrim Taku (13)
| Home colours | Away colours | Third colours |

The 2016–17 season was Klubi i Futbollit Tirana's 78th competitive season, 78th consecutive season in the Kategoria Superiore and 96th year in existence as a football club.

== Season overview ==
=== June ===
On 1 June, Disciplinary Committee of AFA reduced the sentence of Gentian Muça from one year to only the first four matches of the new season. Eight days later, Elis Bakaj terminated his contract with the club and signed with the Croatian Prva HNL team RNK Split. On 13 June, Ilir Daja officially returned to Tirana after he was convinced by the club president Refik Halili, and during the press conference on the same day, they both presented the new project for the new season.

On 15 June, the club parted ways with Ilir Avdyli after only six months of cooperation. A day later, Tirana terminated the cooperation with the midfielder Allush Gavazaj, who spend the previous season on loan at Tërbuni Pukë. Tirana later brought back the veteran goalkeeper Ilion Lika for a third slint at the club.

On 23 June, Gentian Muça was sent on loan at Kukësi only for the club's 2016–17 UEFA Europa League campaign, just like in the previous season. A day later, Argjend Malaj signed with Skënderbeu Korçë as a free agent after he didn't extend his contract with Tirana.

On 29 June, Dritan Smajli left the club after terminating his contract after one season cooperation.

=== July ===
On 4 July, Ansi Nika was signed by the club on a free transfer; Nika signed a two-year contract. One day later, after one-year hiatus, Afrim Taku returned from the United States and signed a one-year contract with Tirana. They were presented on 8 July.

A day later, Tirana acquired the services of Marvin Turtulli from Dinamo Tirana on a three-year contract. Following that, on 11 July, Tirana purchased Asion Daja of Partizani Tirana on a two-year deal, becoming the club's fifth summer signing. On 13 July, Dorian Kërçiku agreed a contract extension with the club, singing until July 2019, while the goalie Edvan Bakaj signed a new two-year contract. One day later, Tirana signed a new two-year deal with Erion Hoxhallari. On the same day, the youngster David Domgjoni returned in the club after finishing his loan at Kastrioti Krujë and penned a three-year contract.

On 17 July, Tirana announced via its official Facebook page that the team traveled to Zlatibor, Serbia to make the summer preparations for the upcoming season. Tirana also informed that the team would stay for two weeks at Iris Hotel and will arrange four friendlies. One day later, Tirana brought on trial Nigerian striker Emeka Emerun, who flew out to Zlatibor to link up with the rest of the squad on their summer training camp. However, he left the team on 25 July after refusing to continue the trial.

Tirana won the first friendly match against OFK Petrovac with the result 3–1. Halili, Karabeci and Bajramaj scored the goals for Tirana. On 22 July, Gentian Muça returned to the team after the end Kukësi's European campaign. One the same day, Ryota Noma and Hiroaki Yamamoto joined the club on trial until the end of summer training camp. In the next friendly match against OFK Grbalj, Tirana suffered a 0–1 narrow defeat, with Todorović scoring the match only goal. In the third friendly versus Novi Pazar, Tirana didn't go more than a goalless draw. In the final friendly against the OFK Beograd, Tirana clinched a 1–0 victory to end thus the summer preparations.

=== August ===
On 19 August, Tirana confirmed the signing of four players, respectively Romuald Ntsitsigui, Ifeanyi Edeh, Moise Nkounkou and Merveille Ndockyt; they all signed two-year contracts and were presented on the same day. A day later, Tirana officially terminated the contract with the defender Ronald Gërçaliu by mutual consensus. On 26 August, Tirana completed the signing of the 19-years old striker Flamur Bajrami on a three-year contract.

=== September ===
Tirana started the month by completing the signing of Argjend Mustafa on a free transfer. Tirana started the season on 7 September with a goalless draw against Teuta Durrës in the opening 2016–17 Kategoria Superiore week. This draw was followed by another goalless draw away against Laçi four days later, a match which brought a controversial moment in the 38th minute as the referee Remzi Sadiku denied Tirana a clear penalty after a handball from a Laçi player. In the matchday 3 against Kukësi at home, Tirana produced a hard-fought performance, coming from behind two times to earn a 2–2 draw. Afrim Taku and Merveille Ndockyt scored the first goals of the season.

In the fourth match against Partizani Tirana in the so-called "Tirana derby", Tirana didn't go more than a goalless draw, making it the fourth consecutive draw. It was the worst start in the history of the club since the 1960'. To begin its Albanian Cup campaign, Tirana was shorted against Sopoti Librazhd and played its first leg match at Selman Stërmasi Stadium. Tirana netted first through a Gilman Lika goal in the 45th minute, but Sopoti equalized via a Mirel Çota penalty minutes before the final whistle.

== Players ==
=== Squad information ===
As of 10 October 2016

| Squad No. | Name | Nationality | Position(s) | Date of Birth (Age) |
Goalkeepers
| 1 | Ilion Lika | (Albania) | GK | 17 May 1980 (aged 36) |
| 31 | Edvan Bakaj | (Albania) | GK | 9 October 1987 (aged 28) |
Defenders
| 3 | Endrit Idrizaj | (Albania) | LB | 14 June 1989 (aged 27) |
| 4 | Gentian Muça | (Albania) | CB/DM | 13 May 1987 (aged 29) |
| 5 | Marvin Turtulli | (Albania) | CB | 17 October 1994 (aged 21) |
| 6 | David Domgjoni | (Albania) | RB | 21 May 1997 (aged 19) |
| 21 | Olsi Teqja | (Albania) | RB / LB / CB | 27 July 1988 (aged 27) |
| 28 | Erion Hoxhallari | (Albania) | LB | 26 February 1993 (aged 23) |
Midfielders
| 7 | Gilman Lika | (Albania) | AMF/LW / RW | 13 January 1987 (aged 29) |
| 10 | Erjon Vucaj | (Albania) | CMF / MF | 25 December 1990 (aged 25) |
| 13 | Erando Karabeci (captain) | (Albania) | CM / DM / AM | 6 September 1988 (aged 27) |
| 14 | Asion Daja | (Albania) | CM / RB | 14 March 1990 (aged 26) |
| 15 | Fjoralb Deliaj | (Albania) | CM | 4 April 1997 (aged 19) |
| 17 | Gjergji Muzaka | (Albania) | LW / RW | 26 September 1984 (aged 31) |
| 18 | Dorian Kërçiku | (Albania) | CM / RB / LB | 30 July 1993 (aged 22) |
| 22 | Moise Nkounkou | (Republic of the Congo) | LM | 2 August 1996 (aged 19) |
| 25 | Majkel Peci | (Albania) | AM | 29 August 1996 (aged 19) |
| 26 | Afrim Taku | (Albania) | CM / RB / RW | 4 August 1989 (aged 26) |
| 77 | Ansi Nika | (Albania) | CM | 22 August 1990 (aged 25) |
| – | Argjend Mustafa | (Kosovo) | CM | 30 August 1992 (aged 23) |
| 19 | Merveille Ndockyt | (Republic of the Congo) | AM / LW / RW | 20 July 1998 (aged 17) |
Forwards
| 3 | Moctar Cisse | (Mali) | CF | 10 March 1993 (aged 23) |
| 8 | Romuald Ntsitsigui | (Gabon) | CF | 8 April 1991 (aged 25) |
| 9 | Grend Halili | (Albania) | CF | 24 May 1998 (aged 18) |
| 11 | Ifeanyi Edeh | (Nigeria) | CF | 25 October 1990 (aged 25) |

== Transfers ==
=== In ===
==== Summer ====
| Date | Pos. | Nationality | Player | Age | Moving from | Fee | Notes | Ref |
|---|---|---|---|---|---|---|---|---|
| 17 June 2016 | GK | (Albania) | Ilion Lika | 36 | Flamurtari Vlorë | Free | | |
| 4 July 2016 | MF | (Albania) | Ansi Nika | 25 | Kukësi | Free | | |
| 5 July 2016 | MF | (Albania) | Afrim Taku | 26 | Free agent | Free | | |
| 9 July 2016 | DF | (Albania) | Marvin Turtulli | 21 | Dinamo Tirana | Free | | |
| 11 July 2016 | MF | (Albania) | Asion Daja | 26 | Partizani Tirana | Free | | |
| 13 July 2016 | DF | (Albania) | David Domgjoni | 19 | Kastrioti Krujë | N/A | Return from loan | |
| 18 July 2016 | FW | (Nigeria) | Emeka Emerun | 19 | Sloboda Užice | Free | | |
| 22 July 2016 | DF | (Albania) | Gentian Muça | 29 | Kukësi | N/A | Return from loan | |
| 20 August 2016 | FW | (Gabon) | Romuald Ntsitsigui | 25 | Mangasport | Free | | |
| 20 August 2016 | FW | (Nigeria) | Ifeanyi Edeh | 25 | Enyimba | Free | | |
| 20 August 2016 | MF | (Republic of the Congo) | Moise Nkounkou | 20 | Léopards | Free | | |
| 20 August 2016 | MF | (Republic of the Congo) | Merveille Ndockyt | 18 | Léopards | Free | | |
| 26 August 2016 | FW | (Kosovo) | Flamur Bajrami | 19 | Free agent | Free | | |
| 2 September 2016 | MF | (Kosovo) | Argjend Mustafa | 24 | Laçi | Free | | |

=== Out ===
==== Summer ====
| Date | Pos. | Nationality | Player | Age | Moving to | Fee | Notes | Ref |
|---|---|---|---|---|---|---|---|---|
| 31 May 2016 | FW | (Japan) | Masato Fukui | 27 | Skënderbeu Korçë (Note: After he and Tirana couldn't find a way for the new contract, Fukui become a free agent, and on 21 June he signed with Skënderbeu Korçë.) | Free | | |
| 9 June 2016 | MF | (Albania) | Elis Bakaj | 28 | RNK Split | Free | | |
| 15 June 2016 | GK | (Kosovo) | Ilir Avdyli | 26 | Free agent | | | |
| 16 June 2016 | MF | (Kosovo) | Allush Gavazaj | 21 | Free agent | | | |
| 23 June 2016 | DF | (Albania) | Gentian Muça | 29 | Kukësi | Free | Only for Europa League campaign | |
| 24 June 2016 | MF | (Kosovo) | Argjend Malaj | 21 | Skënderbeu Korçë | Free | | |
| 29 June 2016 | DF | (Albania) | Dritan Smajli | 29 | Free agent | | | |
| 21 June 2016 | DF | (Austria) | Ronald Gërçaliu | 30 | Free agent | | | |

== Pre-season and friendlies ==
| 20 July 2016 Friendly | Tirana (Albania) | 3–1 | (Montenegro) OFK Petrovac | Zlatibor, Serbia |
| 18:30 CET | Iliovski 76' | Report | Halili 6'; Karabeci 29'; Bajrami 82' | Attendance: 20 |

| 23 July 2016 Friendly | Tirana (Albania) | 0–1 | (Montenegro) OFK Grbalj | Zlatibor, Serbia |
| 18:30 CET | | Report | Todorović 66' |

| 26 July 2016 Friendly | Tirana (Albania) | 0–0 | (Serbia) FK Novi Pazar | Zlatibor, Serbia |
| 18:30 CET | | Report |

| 29 July 2016 Friendly | Tirana (Albania) | 1–0 | (Serbia) OFK Beograd | Zlatibor, Serbia |
| 18:30 CET | Halili 74' | Report |

| 20 August 2016 Friendly | Tirana (Albania) | 2–0 | (Albania) Apolonia Fier | Tirana, Albania |
| 17:00 CET | Edeh 15'; Hoxhallari 44' | | | Stadium: Selman Stërmasi Stadium; Attendance: 200 |

| 24 August 2016 Friendly | Tirana (Albania) | 5–0 | (Albania) Adriatiku Mamurras | Tirana, Albania |
| 16:45 CET | Edeh 5' (pen.); Vucaj 70'; Bajrami 72', 88'; Halili 84' | | | Stadium: Skënder Halili Complex; Attendance: 50 |

| 27 August 2016 Friendly | Tirana (Albania) | 0–0 | (Albania) Korabi Peshkopi | Tirana, Albania |
| 17:00 CET | | Report | | Stadium: Selman Stërmasi Complex; Attendance: 50 |

| 31 August 2016 Friendly | Tirana (Albania) | 3–0 | (Albania) Kamza | Tirana, Albania |
| 17:00 CET | Domgjoni 28'; Bajrami 39'; Merveille 91' | Report | | Stadium: Selman Stërmasi Complex; Attendance: 50 |

== Competitions ==
=== Kategoria Superiore ===
==== League table ====
| Pos | Team | Pld | W | D | L | GF | GA | GD | Pts | Qualification or relegation |
|---|---|---|---|---|---|---|---|---|---|---|
| 6 | Laçi | 36 | 10 | 10 | 16 | 23 | 35 | −12 | 40 | |
| 7 | Vllaznia | 36 | 8 | 16 | 12 | 29 | 35 | −6 | 40 | |
| 8 | Flamurtari (Note: Flamurtari were deducted six points for failing to fulfill financial obligations.) | 36 | 12 | 10 | 14 | 42 | 34 | +8 | 40 | |
| 9 | Tirana (R) | 36 | 8 | 15 | 13 | 29 | 32 | −3 | 39 | Europa League qualifying and relegation to Kategoria e Parë (Note: Tirana qualified for the Europa League first qualifying round by winning the 2016–17 Albanian Cup.) |
| 10 | Korabi (R) | 36 | 2 | 7 | 27 | 11 | 68 | −57 | 13 | Relegation to the 2017–18 Kategoria e Parë |

Source: Albanian Football Association (in Albanian), Soccerway
Rules for classification: 1) Points; 2) Head-to-head points; 3) Head-to-head goal difference; 4) Head-to-head goals scored; 5) Goal difference; 6) Goals scored; 7) Draw.
(R) Relegated

==== Results summary ====
| Overall | | | | | | | | Home | | | | | | Away | | | | | |
| Pld | W | D | L | GF | GA | GD | Pts | W | D | L | GF | GA | GD | W | D | L | GF | GA | GD |
|---|---|---|---|---|---|---|---|---|---|---|---|---|---|---|---|---|---|---|---|
| 36 | 8 | 15 | 13 | 29 | 32 | −3 | 39 | 7 | 8 | 3 | 23 | 13 | +10 | 1 | 7 | 10 | 6 | 19 | −13 |

Last updated: 27 May 2017.
Source: Competitive matches

==== Results by round ====
| Round | 1 | 2 | 3 | 4 | 5 | 6 | 7 | 8 | 9 | 10 | 11 | 12 | 13 | 14 | 15 | 16 | 17 | 18 | 19 | 20 | 21 | 22 | 23 | 24 | 25 | 26 | 27 | 28 | 29 | 30 | 31 | 32 | 33 | 34 | 35 | 36 |
|---|---|---|---|---|---|---|---|---|---|---|---|---|---|---|---|---|---|---|---|---|---|---|---|---|---|---|---|---|---|---|---|---|---|---|---|---|
| Ground | A | A | H | A | H | A | H | A | H | H | H | A | H | A | H | A | H | A | A | A | H | A | H | A | H | A | H | H | H | A | H | A | H | A | H | A |
| Result | D | D | D | D | W | W | W | L | L | W | W | D | D | L | D | L | W | D | L | D | L | L | D | D | D | L | L | L | D | L | L | L | W | L | W | D |
| Position | 6 | 6 | 6 | 6 | 4 | 4 | 4 | 4 | 4 | 4 | 4 | 4 | 4 | 4 | 4 | 4 | 4 | 4 | 4 | 4 | 5 | 5 | 5 | 5 | 6 | 6 | 7 | 7 | 6 | 6 | 8 | 8 | 8 | 7 | 7 | 9 |

Source: Competitive matches
A = Away; H = Home; W = Win; D = Draw; L = Loss

==== Matches ====
| 7 September 2016 1 | Teuta Durrës | 0–0 | Tirana | Durrës |
| 19:00 CET | Hoxha (yellow card) 84' | Report | Teqja (yellow card) 67'; Hoxhallari (yellow card) 71'; Daja (yellow card) 81' | Stadium: Niko Dovana Stadium; Attendance: 1,300; Referee: Lorenc Jemini |

| 11 September 2016 2 | Laçi | 0–0 | Tirana | Laç |
| 16:00 CET | Shala (yellow card) 72'; Lulaj (yellow card) 74'; Lushkja (yellow card) 82' | Report | Kërçiku (yellow card) 11'; Daja (yellow card) 89' | Stadium: Laçi Stadium; Attendance: 1,000; Referee: Remzi Sadiku |

| 17 September 2016 3 | Tirana | 2–2 | Kukësi | Tirana |
| 17:50 CET | I. Lika (yellow card) 7'; Taku 30'; Kërçiku (yellow card) 45'; Ndockyt 66' | Report | Pejić 8' (pen.); Alla (yellow card) 42'; Emini 57'; Greca (yellow card) 58'; Pashaj (yellow card) 79' (yellow-red card) 90' | Stadium: Selman Stërmasi Stadium; Attendance: 1,500; Referee: Lorenc Jemini |

| 25 September 2016 4 | Partizani Tirana | 0–0 | Tirana | Elbasan |
| 19:00 CET | Bertoni (yellow card) 22'; Ekuban (yellow card) 25'; Batha (yellow card) 84' | Report | Taku (yellow card) 37'; Hoxhallari (yellow card) 60'; Karabeci (yellow card) 67'; Teqja (yellow card) 77' | Stadium: Elbasan Arena; Attendance: 6,100; Referee: Enea Jorgji |
Note: The match was played at Elbasan Arena, Elbasan due to recontrustion of Qemal Stafa Stadium, the home ground of Partizani Tirana.

| 2 October 2016 5 | Tirana | 3–0 | Flamurtari Vlorë | Tirana |
| 17:00 CET | Edeh 35'; Taku 39', 90+4' | Report | Marku (yellow card) 85' | Stadium: Selman Stërmasi Stadium; Attendance: 2,500; Referee: Emirjon Sino |

| 12 October 2016 6 | Korabi Peshkopi | 0–1 | Tirana | Tirana |
| 17:00 CET | Nako (yellow card) 50'; Veliaj (yellow card) 58'; Zguro (yellow card) 58'; Dukić (yellow card) 75'; Zefi (yellow card) 90+2' | Report | Taku (yellow card) 43'; Muzaka 90+1'; Nika (yellow card) 90+2' | Stadium: Selman Stërmasi Stadium; Attendance: 2,500; Referee: Kridens Meta |
Note: The match was played at Selman Stërmasi Stadium, Tirana instead Korabi Peshkopi regular home ground.

| 16 October 2016 7 | Tirana | 2–1 | Skënderbeu Korçë | Tirana |
| 17:00 CET | Ndockyt 14' (yellow card) 90+1'; Nkounkou 47'; Karabeci (yellow card) 74'; Hoxhallari (yellow card) 75' | Report | Mustafa (yellow card) 80'; Latifi 83'; Salihi (yellow card) 86' | Stadium: Selman Stërmasi Stadium; Attendance: 4,200; Referee: Enea Jorgji |

| 23 October 2016 8 | Luftëtari Gjirokastër | 2–1 | Tirana | Peqin |
| 13:00 CET | Ramadani (yellow card) 23'; Reginaldo 40'; Bregu 57' | Report | Taku 45' | Stadium: Peqin Stadium; Attendance: 500; Referee: Emirjon Sino |
Note: The match was played at Peqin Stadium, Peqin instead Luftëtari Gjirokastër regular home ground.

| 30 October 2016 9 | Tirana | 0–0 | Vllaznia Shkodër | Tirana |
| 14:00 CET | Vucaj (yellow card) 83' | Report | Tafili (yellow card) 36'; Agović (yellow card) 70' | Stadium: Selman Stërmasi Stadium; Attendance: 1,000; Referee: Laver Alla |

| 6 November 2016 10 | Tirana | 3–1 | Teuta Durrës | Tirana |
| 17:00 CET | Hoxhallari 7'; Muça 15'; Taku 56' | Report | Gripshi 3' | Stadium: Selman Stërmasi Stadium; Attendance: 2,000; Referee: Emirjon Sino |

| 20 November 2016 11 | Tirana | 1–0 | Laçi | Tirana |
| 17:00 CET | Ndockyt 66' | Report | Lulaj (yellow card) 26' | Stadium: Selman Stërmasi Stadium; Attendance: 3,000; Referee: Eldorjan Hamiti |

| 26 November 2016 12 | Kukësi | 0–0 | Tirana | Kukësi |
| 14:00 CET | Hallaçi (yellow card) 38'; Alla (yellow card) 62'; Musolli (yellow card) 90+4' | Report | Daja (yellow card) 63'; Ndockyt (yellow card) 79' | Stadium: Zeqir Ymeri Stadium; Attendance: 3,600; Referee: Kridens Meta |

| 2 December 2016 13 | Tirana | 0–0 | Partizani Tirana | Tirana |
| 14:00 CET | Teqja (yellow card) 39'; Karabeci (yellow card) 75' (yellow-red card) 88' | Report | Krasniqi (yellow card) 80' | Stadium: Selman Stërmasi Stadium; Attendance: 7,531; Referee: Lorenc Jemini |

| 6 December 2016 14 | Flamurtari Vlorë | 1–0 | Tirana | Vlorë |
| 17:00 CET | Shkodra 42'; Veliu (yellow card) 47'; Danilo Alves (yellow card) 73' | Report | Vucaj (red card) 73' | Stadium: Flamurtari Stadium; Attendance: 2,500; Referee: Remzi Sadiku |

| 10 December 2016 15 | Tirana | 1–1 | Korabi Peshkopi | Tirana |
| 17:00 CET | Taku 7'; Daja (yellow card) 41' | Report | Plaku 24' (yellow card) 30'; Mziu (yellow card) 31'; Prifti (yellow card) 56'; Dukić (yellow card) 76'; Gavazaj (yellow card) 78' | Stadium: Selman Stërmasi Stadium; Attendance: 500; Referee: Kridens Meta |

| 14 December 2016 16 | Skënderbeu Korçë | 2–0 | Tirana | Korçë |
| 17:00 CET | Salihi 4'; Radaš (yellow card) 15'; Mici (yellow card) 35'; Latifi 84'; Idrizaj (yellow card) 87' | Report | Acquah (yellow card) 65'; Karabeci (yellow card) 66' | Stadium: Skënderbeu Stadium; Attendance: 4,000; Referee: Enea Jorgji |

| 18 December 2016 17 | Tirana | 2–0 | Luftëtari Gjirokastër | Tirana |
| 14:00 CET | Taku 45+1'; Ndockyt 75' | Report | | Stadium: Selman Stërmasi Stadium; Attendance: 600; Referee: Emirjon Sino |

| 22 December 2016 18 | Vllaznia Shkodër | 0–0 | Tirana | Shkodër |
| 14:00 CET | | Report | Karabeci (yellow card) 90+3' | Stadium: Loro Boriçi Stadium; Attendance: 2,700; Referee: Adrian Beqiri |

| 28 January 2017 19 | Teuta Durrës | 1–0 | Tirana | Durrës |
| 17:00 CET | Hila 52'; Dita (yellow card) 56' | Report | Hoxhallari (yellow card) 87' | Stadium: Niko Dovana Stadium; Attendance: 1,100; Referee: Emirjon Sino |

| 5 February 2017 20 | Laçi | 1–0 | Tirana | Laç |
| 14:00 CET | Mensah 35' (yellow card) 90'; Musaj (yellow card) 67'; Nika (yellow card) 69' | Report | Hoxhallari (yellow card) 25' | Stadium: Laçi Stadium; Attendance: 1,000; Referee: Andi Koçi |

| 11 February 2017 21 | Tirana | 1–2 | Kukësi | Tirana |
| 17:00 CET | Taku 38' | Report | Pejić 57'; Carioca (yellow card) 65'; Emini 83' | Stadium: Selman Stërmasi Stadium; Attendance: 1,000; Referee: Enea Jorgji |

| 20 February 2017 22 | Partizani Tirana | 2–1 | Tirana | Tirana |
| 18:00 CET | Malota 13'; Ekuban 70'; Ćetković (yellow card) 90+2' | Report | Hoxhallari (yellow card) 38'; Teqja 47'; Daja (yellow card) 58' | Stadium: Selman Stërmasi Stadium; Attendance: 3,500; Referee: Kridens Meta |
Note: The match was played at Selman Stërmasi Stadium, Tirana due to recontrustion of Qemal Stafa Stadium, the home ground of Partizani Tirana.

| 26 February 2017 23 | Tirana | 0–0 | Flamurtari Vlorë | Tirana |
| 17:00 CET | | Report | Hyseni (yellow card) 36' | Stadium: Selman Stërmasi Stadium; Attendance: 350; Referee: Glen Tonna (Malta) |

| 4 March 2017 24 | Korabi Peshkopi | 1–1 | Tirana | Shkodër |
| 17:00 CET | Kaja 40' | Report | Edeh 45' | Stadium: Loro Boriçi Stadium; Attendance: 131; Referee: Lorenc Jemini |
Note: The match was played at Loro Boriçi Stadium, Shkodër instead Korabi Peshkopi regular home ground.

| 10 March 2017 25 | Tirana | 2–2 | Skënderbeu Korçë | Tirana |
| 17:00 CET | Edeh 3'; Hoxhallari 41'; Ndockyt (yellow card) 63' | Report | Salihi 16' (pen.), 59'; Orelesi (yellow card) 28'; Nimaga (yellow card) 40'; Radaš (yellow card) 71' | Stadium: Selman Stërmasi Stadium; Attendance: 5,000; Referee: Enea Jorgji |

| 19 March 2017 26 | Luftëtari Gjirokastër | 2–1 | Tirana | Gjirokastër |
| 14:00 CET | Bregu (yellow card) 31' (goal) 72'; Zguro (yellow card) 35' (yellow-red card) 74'; Rroca (yellow card) 36'; Lamçja (yellow card) 55' (goal) 58'; Ruçi (yellow card) 90+3' | Report | Teqja (yellow card) 57'; Cissé 90+1' | Stadium: Gjirokastra Stadium; Attendance: 3,000; Referee: Juxhin Xhaja |

| 31 March 2017 27 | Tirana | 1–2 | Vllaznia Shkodër | Tirana |
| 19:00 CET | Teqja (yellow card) 14'; Cissé 79' | Report | Vrapi (yellow card) 10'; Bardulla (yellow card) 33'; Krymi (yellow card) 49'; Gocaj 53' (pen.); Gurishta 82' | Stadium: Selman Stërmasi Stadium; Attendance: 2,000; Referee: Emirjon Sino |

| 10 April 2017 28 | Tirana | 0–0 | Teuta Durrës | Tirana |
| 19:00 CET | Turtulli (yellow card) 73'; Daja (yellow card) 84' | Report | Sykaj (yellow card) 48'; Bangal (yellow card) 75' | Stadium: Selman Stërmasi Stadium; Attendance: 2,000; Referee: Remzi Sadiku |

| 15 April 2017 29 | Tirana | 0–0 | Laçi | Tirana |
| 19:00 CET | | Report | Lushkja (yellow card) 61'; Sefgjinaj (yellow card) 79'; Lulaj (yellow card) 83' | Stadium: Selman Stërmasi Stadium; Attendance: 500; Referee: Juxhin Xhaja |

| 23 April 2017 30 | Kukësi | 4–1 | Tirana | Kukësi |
| 16:00 CET | Emini 55'; Pejić 62' (pen.), 89'; Carioca 80' | Report | Cake (yellow card) 62'; Turtulli 74' | Stadium: Zeqir Ymeri Stadium; Attendance: 800; Referee: Kreshnik Cjapi |

| 28 April 2017 31 | Tirana | 1–2 | Partizani Tirana | Tirana |
| 19:00 CET | Edeh 14'; Daja (yellow card) 28'; Bakaj (red card) 87' | Report | Batha 45' (pen.) (yellow card) 89'; Kalari (yellow card) 45'; Ekuban (yellow card) 69'; Krasniqi (yellow card) 72'; Mazrekaj (yellow card) 80'; Sukaj 87'; Ibrahimi (red card) 87' | Stadium: Selman Stërmasi Stadium; Attendance: 5,000; Referee: Juxhin Xhaja |

| 6 May 2017 32 | Flamurtari Vlorë | 2–0 | Tirana | Vlorë |
| 19:00 CET | Veliu (yellow card) 33'; Shkodra (yellow card) 67' (goal) 89'; Bušić 90+1' | Report | Cake (yellow card) 45'; Edeh (yellow card) 61'; Karabeci (yellow card) 88' | Stadium: Flamurtari Stadium; Attendance: 4,000; Referee: Enea Jorgji |

| 10 May 2017 33 | Tirana | 2–0 | Korabi Peshkopi | Tirana |
| 16:00 CET | Bakaj (yellow card) 23'; Turtulli (yellow card) 41'; Edeh 47'; Taku 56' | Report | Zefi (yellow card) 38'; Prençi (yellow card) 50'; Kaloshi (yellow card) 55'; Jubani (red card) 62'; Shabani (yellow card) 63'; Mziu (yellow card) 70' (yellow-red card) 73' | Stadium: Selman Stërmasi Stadium; Attendance: 500; Referee: Kreshnik Cjapi |

| 15 May 2017 34 | Skënderbeu Korçë | 1–0 | Tirana | Korçë |
| 19:00 CET | Latifi (yellow card) 8'; Orelesi (yellow card) 35'; Salihi 84' (pen.) (yellow card) 90+4'; Adeniyi (yellow card) 90+5' | Report | Teqja (yellow card) 19'; Ndockyt (yellow card) 19'; Hoxhallari (yellow card) 58'; Turtulli (yellow card) 69'; Karabeci (yellow card) 88'; Lika (yellow card) 90+4' | Stadium: Skënderbeu Stadium; Attendance: 4,500; Referee: Eldorjan Hamiti |

| 20 May 2017 35 | Tirana | 2–0 | Luftëtari Gjirokastër | Tirana |
| 17:30 CET | Edeh 45'; Ndockyt 85' | Report | Brahimaj (yellow card) 23'; Beqiri (yellow card) 32'; Aleksi (yellow card) 47'; Mutumane (yellow card) 69' | Stadium: Selman Stërmasi Stadium; Attendance: 2,500; Referee: Kridens Meta |

| 27 May 2017 36 | Vllaznia Shkodër | 0–0 | Tirana | Shkodër |
| 17:00 CET | Krymi (yellow card) 2'; Bardulla (yellow card) 32'; Pjeshka (red card) 90+1' | Report | Hoxhallari (yellow card) 15'; Cissé (red card) 90+1' | Stadium: Loro Boriçi Stadium; Attendance: 10,000; Referee: Paolo Mazzoleni (Italy) |

=== Albanian Cup ===
==== First round ====
| 28 September 2016 First leg | Sopoti Librazhd | 1–1 | Tirana | Tirana |
| 16:00 CET | Çota 86' (pen.); Bishaj (yellow card) 89' | Report | G. Lika 45'; Karabeci (yellow card) 55' | Stadium: Selman Stërmasi Stadium; Attendance: 300; Referee: Indrit Zhuli |
Note: The match was held in Selman Stërmasi Stadium due to reconstruction of Sopoti Stadium.

| 5 October 2016 Second leg | Tirana | 7–0 (8–1 agg.) | Sopoti Librazhd | Tirana |
| 15:00 CET | Taku 6', 17'; Peci 21', 79', 89'; Deliaj (yellow card) 75'; Halili 83', 86' | Report | | Stadium: Selman Stërmasi Stadium; Attendance: 300; Referee: Erjon Bastari |

==== Second round ====
| 26 October 2016 First leg | Luftëtari Gjirokastër | 1–4 | Tirana | Lushnje |
| 14:00 CET | Zogaj 21'; Liçaj (yellow card) 89' | Report | Nika 46'; Cissé 52', 61', 78'; Bajrami (yellow card) 59' | Stadium: Abdurrahman Roza Haxhiu Stadium; Attendance: 80; Referee: Olsid Ferataj |
Note: The match was held in Abdurrahman Roza Haxhiu Stadium instead of Luftëtari's regular ground Gjirokastra Stadium.

| 16 November 2016 Second leg | Tirana | 1–0 (5–1 agg.) | Luftëtari Gjirokastër | Tirana |
| 13:30 CET | Vucaj 11' | Report | Zogaj (yellow card) 66'; Boyom (yellow card) 85' | Stadium: Selman Stërmasi Stadium; Attendance: 500; Referee: Andi Koçi |

==== Quarter-finals ====
| 1 February 2017 First leg | Tirana | 2–1 | Kukësi | Tirana |
| 17:00 CET | Halili 30'; Taku 45'; Domgjoni (yellow card) 54'; Edeh (yellow card) 59' | Report | Emini 47'; Musolli (yellow card) 59'; Calé (yellow card) 75' | Stadium: Selman Stërmasi Stadium; Attendance: 500; Referee: Eldorjan Hamiti |

| 15 February 2017 Second leg | Kukësi | 0–0 (1–2 agg.) | Tirana | Kukës |
| 13:30 CET | Memini (yellow card) 34'; Hasani (yellow card) 38' | Report | Halili (yellow card) 38' | Stadium: Zeqir Ymeri Stadium; Attendance: 1,500; Referee: Kridens Meta |

==== Semi-finals ====
| 5 April 2017 First leg | Besëlidhja Lezhë | 1–1 | Tirana | Kukës |
| 16:00 CET | Smajli (yellow card) 34'; Marashi 67' | Report | Ndockyt 59'; Acquah (yellow card) 62'; Karabeci (yellow card) 83' | Stadium: Zeqir Ymeri Stadium; Attendance: 1,000; Referee: Enea Jorgji |
Note: The match was held in Zeqir Ymeri Stadium instead of Besëlidhja's regular ground Brian Filipi Stadium.

| 19 April 2017 Second leg | Tirana | 2–0 (3–1 agg.) | Besëlidhja Lezhë | Tirana |
| 18:00 CET | Taku 23' (pen.); Hoxhallari 39'; Teqja (yellow card) 45' | Report | Sidibe (yellow card) 23'; Dibra (yellow card) 39' | Stadium: Selman Stërmasi Stadium; Attendance: 1,000; Referee: Laver Alla |

==== Final ====
| 31 May 2017 Final | Skënderbeu Korçë | 1–3 | Tirana | Elbasan |
| 19:00 CET | Vangjeli (yellow card) 73'; Radas 86'; Jashanica (yellow card) 102'; Karimi (yellow card) 104' | Report | Edeh 20' (yellow card) 21'; Bakaj (yellow card) 67'; Halili (yellow card) 85'; Nkounkou 102'; Hoxhallari (yellow card) 104'; Daja (yellow card) 107'; Ndockyt 112' (pen.) | Stadium: Elbasan Arena; Attendance: 1,500; Referee: Kridens Meta |

== Statistics ==
=== Squad stats ===
| | League | Cup | Total Stats |
|---|---|---|---|
| Games played | 5 | 2 | 7 |
| Games won | 1 | 1 | 2 |
| Games drawn | 4 | 1 | 5 |
| Games lost | 0 | 0 | 0 |
| Goals scored | 5 | 8 | 13 |
| Goals conceded | 2 | 1 | 3 |
| Goal difference | 3 | 7 | 10 |
| Clean sheets | 4 | 1 | 5 |

Last updated: 10 October 2016
Source: Soccerway

=== Top scorers ===
| No. | Pos. | Nation | Name | Kategoria Superiore | Albanian Cup | Total |
|---|---|---|---|---|---|---|
| 26 | MF | (Albania) | Afrim Taku | 3 | 2 | 5 |
| 25 | MF | (Albania) | Majkel Peci | 0 | 3 | 3 |
| 9 | FW | (Albania) | Grend Halili | 0 | 2 | 2 |
| 7 | MF | (Albania) | Gilman Lika | 0 | 1 | 1 |
| 11 | FW | (Nigeria) | Ifeanyi Edeh | 1 | 0 | 1 |
| 19 | FW | (Republic of the Congo) | Merveille Ndockyt | 1 | 0 | 1 |
| TOTAL | | | | 5 | 8 | 13 |

Last updated: 10 October 2016

=== Clean sheets ===
The list is sorted by shirt number when total appearances are equal.

| Rnk | No. | Player | Kategoria Superiore | Albanian Cup | Total |
|---|---|---|---|---|---|
| 1 | 1 | (Albania) Ilion Lika | 4 | 0 | 4 |
| 2 | 31 | (Albania) Edvan Bakaj | 0 | 1 | 1 |
| TOTALS | | | 4 | 1 | 5 |

Last updated: 10 October 2016.
Source: Soccerway
