= 2017 Albanian Cup final =

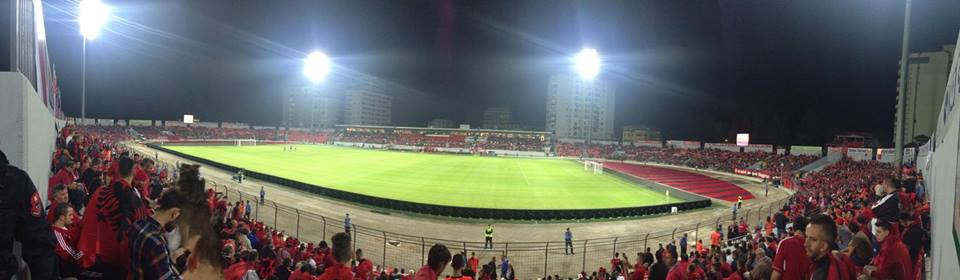
- The Elbasan Arena in Elbasan held the final
- Event: 2016–17 Albanian Cup
Skënderbeu	Tirana
1	3
- After extra time
- Date: 31 May 2017
- Venue: Elbasan Arena, Elbasan
- Referee: Kridens Meta
- Attendance: 1,500

The 2017 Albanian Cup final was a football match played on 31 May 2017 to decide the winner of the 2016–17 Albanian Cup, the 65th edition of Albania's primary football cup.

The match was between Skënderbeu and Tirana at the Elbasan Arena in Elbasan.

Tirana, already relegated for the first time in history, won the final 3–1 after extra-time for their 11th Albanian Cup title.

== Background ==
Skënderbeu had previously played in 5 Albanian Cup finals, failing to win any of these. Meanwhile, Tirana had played 23 finals, winning a record 15.

== Match ==
=== Details ===
31 May 2017
19:00

Skënderbeu	1–3 (a.e.t.)	Tirana
Radaš 86'	Report	Edeh 20'; Nkounkou 102'; Ndockyt 112' (pen.)

Elbasan Arena, Elbasan
Attendance: 1,500
Referee: Kridens Meta

Skënderbeu	Tirana

GK	1	(Albania) Orges Shehi (c)
DF	32	(Albania) Kristi Vangjeli	(yellow card) 73'
DF	33	(Croatia) Marko Radaš
DF	3	(Albania) Gledi Mici		(substituted off) 63'
DF	5	(Kosovo) Bajram Jashanica	(yellow card) 102'
MF	17	(Albania) Gjergji Muzaka
MF	8	(Mali) Bakary Nimaga
MF	78	(Nigeria) James Adeniyi
MF	27	(Albania) Liridon Latifi		(substituted off) 77'
MF	7	(Albania) Enis Gavazaj		(substituted off) 77'
FW	9	(Albania) Sebino Plaku
ЗSubstitutes:
GK	95	(Albania) Aldo Teqja
DF	6	(Albania) Xhefri Bushi
DF	28	(Albania) Hektor Idrizaj		(substituted on) 63'
MF	11	(Albania) Leonit Abazi
MF	18	(Albania) Nazmi Gripshi		(substituted on) 77'
MF	22	(Romania) Cornel Predescu
MF	77	(Iran) Reza Karimi	(yellow card) 104'	(substituted on) 77'
Manager:
(Albania) Ilir Daja

GK	1	(Albania) Ilion Lika
DF	28	(Albania) Erion Hoxhallari	(yellow card) 104'
DF	21	(Albania) Olsi Teqja
DF	5	(Albania) Marvin Turtulli
DF	17	(Albania) Albi Doka		(substituted off) 83'
MF	13	(Albania) Erando Karabeci (c)
MF	18	(Albania) Dorian Kërçiku
MF	45	(Ghana) Reuben Acquah
MF	19	(Republic of the Congo) Merveille Ndockyt
MF	7	(Albania) Gilman Lika		(substituted off) 63'
FW	11	(Nigeria) Ifeanyi Edeh	(yellow card) 21'	(substituted off) 79'
Substitutes:
GK	31	(Albania) Edvan Bakaj	(yellow card) 67'
DF	2	(Albania) Marlind Nuriu
DF	15	(Albania) Fjoralb Deliaj
MF	14	(Albania) Asion Daja	(yellow card) 107'	(substituted on) 63'
MF	22	(Republic of the Congo) Moise Nkounkou		(substituted on) 79'
FW	9	(Albania) Grent Halili	(yellow card) 85'	(substituted on) 83'
Manager:
(Albania) Mirel Josa

Assistant referees:
Ilir Tartari
Ridigert Çokaj
Fourth official:
Ermal Barushi

Match rules

- 90 minutes.
- 30 minutes of extra time if necessary.
- Penalty shoot-out if score is still level.
- Seven named substitutes, of which up to three may be used.
