= Flamur =

- Gender: Male

Origin
- Meaning: "flag"
- Region of origin: Albania

Flamur is an Albanian masculine given name, taken from the Albanian word flamur, meaning "flag". Notable people bearing the name Flamur include:

- Flamur Bajrami (born 1997), Kosovar footballer
- Flamur Dzelili (born 1999), Swedish footballer
- Flamur Kastrati (born 1991), Kosovar footballer
- Flamur Noka (born 1971), Albanian politician, former Minister of the Interior
- Flamur Ruçi (born 2002), Albanian footballer
- Flamur Tairi (born 1990), Macedonian-Albanian footballer
