= 2016–17 KF Vllaznia Shkodër season =

Vllaznia Shkodër
2016–17 season
- Chairman: Voltana Ademi
- Manager: Armando Cungu
- Stadium: Loro Boriçi Stadium
- Kategoria Superiore: 7th
- Albanian Cup: Quarter-finals
Home colours	Away colours

This article covers the 2016–17 season for Vllaznia Shkodër. They participate in the Kategoria Superiore.

== Competitions ==
=== Kategoria Superiore ===
==== League table ====
Pos	Team	Pld	W	D	L	GF	GA	GD	Pts	Qualification or relegation
5	Teuta	36	10	10	16	27	34	−7	40	
6	Laçi	36	10	10	16	23	35	−12	40	
7	Vllaznia	36	8	16	12	29	35	−6	40	
8	Flamurtari (Note: Flamurtari were deducted six points for failing to fulfill financial obligations.)	36	12	10	14	42	34	+8	40	
9	Tirana (R)	36	8	15	13	29	32	−3	39	Europa League qualifying and relegation to Kategoria e Parë (Note: Tirana qualified for the Europa League first qualifying round by winning the 2016–17 Albanian Cup.)

Source: Albanian Football Association (in Albanian), Soccerway
Rules for classification: 1) Points; 2) Head-to-head points; 3) Head-to-head goal difference; 4) Head-to-head goals scored; 5) Goal difference; 6) Goals scored; 7) Draw.
(R) Relegated

==== Results summary ====
Overall								Home						Away					
Pld	W	D	L	GF	GA	GD	Pts	W	D	L	GF	GA	GD	W	D	L	GF	GA	GD
36	8	16	12	29	35	−6	40	5	9	4	18	14	+4	3	7	8	11	21	−10

Last updated: 27 May 2017.

==== Results by round ====
Round	1	2	3	4	5	6	7	8	9	10	11	12	13	14	15	16	17	18	19	20	21	22	23	24	25	26	27	28	29	30	31	32	33	34	35	36
Ground	H	A	H	A	A	A	H	H	A	A	H	A	H	H	H	A	A	H	H	A	H	A	H	A	H	H	A	A	H	A	H	A	H	A	A	H
Result	D	D	W	D	L	D	L	W	D	L	D	W	W	D	L	L	D	D	L	L	W	W	L	D	W	D	W	D	D	L	D	L	D	L	L	D
Position	8	7	4	4	5	5	5	5	5	6	5	5	5	5	5	6	6	6	6	6	6	6	6	6	5	5	5	5	4	5	5	5	5	5	6	7

Source: Soccerway
A = Away; H = Home; W = Win; D = Draw; L = Loss
