= Majkel Peçi =

Albanian footballer

Personal information
- Date of birth: 29 August 1996 (age 30)
- Place of birth: Tirana, Albania
- Height: 1.79 m (5 ft 10 in)
- Position: Attacking midfielder

Team information
- Current team: Bylis
- Number: 22

Youth career
- 2011–2012: A.F Dinamo
- 2012–2015: Tirana

Senior career*
Years	Team	Apps	(Gls)
2014–2017	Tirana	22	(2)
2015–2016	Tirana B	6	(3)
2017	→ Sopoti (loan)	8	(1)
2017	Korabi	11	(2)
2018	Burreli	13	(4)
2018–2019	Kamza	9	(0)
2019–	Bylis	13	(0)
2019	→ Turbina (loan)	10	(1)

International career
2014	Albania U19	3	(0)
- * Club domestic league appearances and goals as of 15:09, 25 August 2020 (UTC)

Majkel Peçi (born 29 August 1996) is an Albanian professional footballer who plays as an attacking midfielder for Albanian club KF Bylis Ballsh.

== Club career ==
=== Early career ===
Peçi started his youth career with A.F Dinamo in 2011. After spending 1 season here, he signed with KF Tirana.

=== Tirana ===
Peci was promoted to the senior team at Tirana by coach Gugash Magani during the 2014–15 season where he made his professional debut in the Albanian Cup against Sopoti Librazhd.

He made his league debut on 13 February 2016 in a home game against Bylis Ballsh, coming on as a 70th-minute substitute for Gilman Lika and scoring his first professional goal in the 2–0 win. He dedicated his debut goal to the club's fans, players and coaching staff, in particular the head coach Ilir Daja who handed him his league debut.

He made his first appearance of the 2016–17 season on 2 October in the league match against Flamurtari Vlorë, appearing as a substitute and providing the third goal of the match in an eventual 3–0 home win; it was the first win of the season after four draws in the first four matches. Three days later, in the second leg of the Albanian Cup first round against Sopoti Librazhd, Peci netted his first career hat-trick, helping the team to win 7–0 and to progress in the next round with the aggregate 8–1.

==== Loan at Sopoti Librazhd ====
On 23 January 2017 the Albanian First Division side Sopoti Librazhd announced to have signed Peçi on loan until the end of the 2016–17 season.

== International career ==
Peçi received his first call up at the Albania national under-21 football team by coach Alban Bushi for a gathering between 14 and 17 May 2017 with most of the players selected from Albanian championships.

== Career statistics ==
=== Club ===
As of 23 December 2017

Club statistics
Club	Season	League			Cup		Europe (Note: Including continental competitions, such as UEFA Champions League and UEFA Europa League)		Other (Note: Including other competitions, such as 2016–17 Albanian First Division play-out)		Total	
Club	Season	Division	Apps	Goals	Apps	Goals	Apps	Goals	Apps	Goals	Apps	Goals
Tirana	2014–15	Albanian Superliga	—		0	0	—		—		0	0
Tirana	2015–16	Albanian Superliga	12	1	3	0	—		—		15	1
Tirana	2016–17	Albanian Superliga	1	0	2	3	—		—		3	3
Tirana	Total		13	1	5	3	—		—		18	4
Tirana B	2015–16	Albanian Second Division	2	1	—		—		—		2	1
Tirana B	2016–17	Albanian Second Division	4	2	—		—		—		4	2
Tirana B	Total		6	3	—		—		—		6	3
Sopoti Librazhd	2016–17	Albanian First Division	8	1	—		—		1	0	9	1
Korabi Peshkopi	2017–18	Albanian First Division	11	2	2	0	—		—		13	2
Career total			38	7	7	3	—		1	0	46	10
