= Afrim Taku =

Albanian footballer

Personal information
- Date of birth: 4 August 1989 (age 37)
- Place of birth: Tirana, Albania
- Height: 1.80 m (5 ft 11 in)
- Position: Midfielder

Youth career
- 2004–2010: Tirana

Senior career*
Years	Team	Apps	(Gls)
2008–2015	Tirana	111	(4)
2008–2009	→ Skrapari (loan)	11	(0)
2016–2017	Tirana	34	(9)
2017–2018	Skënderbeu	14	(5)
2018	Tampa Bay Rowdies	15	(0)
2019	Charlotte Independence	26	(0)
2019	Tampa Bay Rowdies	4	(1)
- * Club domestic league appearances and goals as of 24 October 2019

Afrim Taku (born 4 August 1989) is an Albanian professional footballer.

== Club career ==
=== Early career ===
Taku began his football career as a 13-year-old when he joined the KF Tirana academy, where he progressed through the ranks before eventually being loaned out to Albanian First Division side Skrapari for the 2008–09 campaign in order to gain first team experience. He made his professional debut in the First Division with Skrapari, where he featured in 11 league games as he helped the side narrowly avoid the relegation playoff places by a single point.

=== Tirana ===
He returned to his parent club Tirana but did not feature at all in the club's 2009–10 campaign, but he was promoted to the first team by head coach Nevil Dede ahead of the 2010–11 season, and he made his debut for the club in the Albanian Cup against his former side Skrapari on 20 October 2010 in a 1–0 away win in which Taku played the full 90 minutes of. He made his Albanian Superliga debut on 20 November 2010 in a 3–1 home win over Elbasani, where he came on as a 76th-minute substitute for Mladen Žižović. Dede left the club soon after and Mišo Krstičević took charge of the team, and the Croatian coach handed Taku his first Superliga start on 30 April 2011 in a 2–1 loss to Flamurtari Vlorë. He made five league appearances in his debut season with Tirana as the club finished in a disappointing 5th place, and he made four cup appearances as Tirana went on to beat local rivals Dinamo Tirana in the final to win the trophy, which was the first major trophy of Taku's career.

==== Breakthrough ====
When Spanish coach Julián Rubio took charge of Tirana in June 2011, he placed his faith in the 21 year-old Taku, and he was handed his European debut in the club's season opener in the UEFA Europa League qualifier against Slovak side Spartak Trnava, which ended in a goalless draw as Taku played the full 90 minutes. He also played the full game in the second leg, which Tirana ultimately ended up losing 3–1 on aggregate, as they were knocked out of the competition. He then played in his first ever Albanian Supercup against Skënderbeu Korçë on 18 August 2011, where he was substituted off in the second half of the 1–0 win as he won the second trophy of his career.

Taku's career took off when coach Julián Rubio came in charge of Tirana in June 2011. He was part of the senior squad almost on every game of the Albanian Superliga for the 2011–12 season except for two matches. Taku's best performance was in the Albanian Supercup for 2011–12 season, a match where the two best football teams in Albania compete to win the ultimate trophy. He scored his first official goal in this decisive match which he dedicated to his coach and the national coach Gianni De Biasi.

On 11 August 2014, Taku agreed a contract extension with the club, signing a contract for the 2014–15 season. Following the end of the 2014–15 season, Taku moved to the United States to live with his wife, but he did not join a football club during his time there.

==== The return ====
On 5 July 2016, after a year abroad he returned to Albania as he agreed play for Tirana, signing a one-year contract. He was presented three days later along with Ansi Nika, and was handed his old squad number 26. He made his return debut on 7 September in the opening league match against Teuta Durrës, playing full-90 minutes in a goalless draw. Under the coach Ilir Daja, Taku was placed as a right-winger, moving him closed to the goal. He scored his first goal ten days later in the matchday 3 against Kukësi, helping his side to earn the third consecutive draw. On 2 October, Taku scored two goals in the 3–0 home win against Flamurtari Vlorë; it was the first win of the season after four draws in the first four matches.

He was declared Albanian Superliga Player of the Month by the association "Sporti na bashkon". He was considered to be an unexpected "hero" with his goals, leaving behind the strikers on the team. He had been activated every game for full 90 min, never suspended, substituted or on the bench. On 10 March 2017, during the match against the rivals Skënderbeu Korçë at home, Taku was replaced for the first time this season by the coach Josa in the last minute of regular time with the score tied at 2–2. Taku, however, was not happy with the decision of missing the last few minutes, waiting by the sidelines for the game to finish. One day later, during the match analysis, Josa asked the players if any of them had anything to say, and Taku was the only one who talked, asking the coach why he was replaced, if he made a mistake. Josa replied by saying that he was not irreplaceable. Based on unverified reports, Taku answered back, which led the coach to exclude him out from dressing room. He also added that he asked the president to leave the club given how negative the situation at KF Tirana had become. Then, he was suspended for 10 days. While suspended, attempts were made by other teams in Superliga to obtain Taku, most notably by Partizani Tirana who are "enemies" with the "White&Blues". After meeting with the club, Taku returned in training on 22 March. Taku apologized to the coach and teammates for the incident and promised that was not going to happen again. Overall, Taku did not make any public comments or official announcement about what actually happened. He went on to join the Albania national team within 3 days.

He returned on action on 31 March by playing full-90 minutes in the 1–2 home defeat to Vllaznia Shkodër. On 19 April, in the second leg of 2016–17 Albanian Cup semi-final against Besëlidhja Lezhë, Taku scored a penalty kick in an eventual 2–0 home win, which sent Tirana in the Albanian Cup final for the first time since 2011–12 season. Later on 10 May, Taku scored the second goal in Tirana's 2–0 home win over already relegated Korabi Peshkopi, helping the White&Blues to return to winning ways in league after 15 matches.

On 27 May, Taku played full-90 minutes in the final matchday against Vllaznia in Shkodër which finished in a goalless draw, meaning that the club finished the season in 9th place which relegated them for the first time in history, leaving Vllaznia as the only club not to be relegated. Four days later, he was an unused substitute as Tirana won the Albanian Cup for the 16th in history, beating Skënderbeu 3–1 in the final. Taku finished the season with 9 goals in the league and 4 goals in the cup, playing 42 matches. In June 2017, Taku left the club after deciding not to extend his contract, becoming a free agent in the process.

=== Skënderbeu Korçë ===
On 17 June 2017, Skënderbeu Korçë president Ardian Takaj confirmed that Taku was going to play for the club for the upcoming season. One week later, Taku was officially presented at Skënderbeu Korçë, penning a temporary contract for the Europa League games, with the possibility to extend for the season, rejoining his former Tirana boss Ilir Daja. On 4 August 2017 Taku solved his contract with Skënderbeu by mutual consensus and he went back to the United States for documentations case. Taku returned to the team on 30 August and signed a contract for the 2017–18 season. He scored his first goals of the season on 15 October in the matchday 6 of championship in the 4–1 home win over Lushnja.

Taku officially left the club in mid-March 2018 after failing to return from the United States due to documentation issues. Despite leaving midway through the season, Taku still received a winner's medal for Skënderbeu's triumphs in the championship and cup.

=== Tampa Bay Rowdies ===
On 20 June 2018, Taku signed with the Tampa Bay Rowdies of the USL. He was one of two midseason signings for the Rowdies on that day, along with Dominic Oduro.

== International career ==
After an impressive season with Tirana, on 7 June 2015 Taku received his first international level call up in the Albania national team by coach Gianni De Biasi for the friendly match against France on 13 June 2015. He was an unused substitute during the entire match, as Albania beat France 1–0 at Elbasan Arena to receive a historic result.

Taku rejoined the Albania national team in March 2017, where among Keidi Bare was invited by coach Gianni De Biasi to replace Taulant Xhaka and Amir Abrashi which left the gathering for the Friendly match against Bosnia and Herzegovina on 28 March 2017. He didn't manage to play in the game which finished as a 2–1 loss.

== Personal life ==
Taku has stated that his role model and favourite footballer is former Argentine footballer Javier Zanetti.

== Career statistics ==
=== Club ===
As of 23 December 2017

Club statistics
Club	Season	League			Cup		Europe (Note: Including continental competitions, such as UEFA Champions League and UEFA Europa League)		Other (Note: Including other competitions, such as Albanian Supercup)		Total	
Club	Season	Division	Apps	Goals	Apps	Goals	Apps	Goals	Apps	Goals	Apps	Goals
Skrapari	2008–09	Albanian First Division	11	0	1	0	—		—		12	0
Tirana	2009–10	Albanian Superliga	0	0	0	0	—		—		0	0
Tirana	2010–11	Albanian Superliga	5	0	4	0	0	0	—		9	0
Tirana	2011–12	Albanian Superliga	25	0	14	0	2	0	1	0	42	0
Tirana	2012–13	Albanian Superliga	25	1	4	0	4	0	1	1	34	2
Tirana	2013–14	Albanian Superliga	22	2	4	1	—		—		26	3
Tirana	2014–15	Albanian Superliga	34	1	7	3	—		—		41	4
Tirana	2016–17	Albanian Superliga	34	9	8	4	—		—		42	13
Tirana	Total		145	13	41	8	6	0	2	1	194	22
Skënderbeu Korçë	2017–18	Albanian Superliga	14	5	3	0	9 (Note: Appearances in the UEFA Europa League)	0	—		26	5
Career total			170	18	45	8	15	0	2	1	230	27

== Honours ==
=== Club ===
Tirana

- Albanian Cup: 2010–11, 2011–12, 2016–17
- Albanian Supercup: 2011, 2012

=== Individual ===
Albanian Superliga Player of the Month: November 2016.
