= Erjon Vucaj =

Albanian footballer

Personal information
- Date of birth: 25 December 1990 (age 35)
- Place of birth: Shkodër, Albania
- Height: 1.72 m (5 ft 8 in)
- Position: Midfielder

Team information
- Current team: Flamurtari
- Number: 20

Youth career
- 2004–2007: Vllaznia Shkodër

Senior career*
Years	Team	Apps	(Gls)
2007–2008	Vllaznia Shkodër	1	(0)
2009–2014	Laçi	122	(23)
2014–2015	Flamurtari	32	(0)
2015–2016	Tirana	30	(1)
2017	Laçi	15	(1)
2017–2018	Vllaznia Shkodër	31	(1)
2018–2022	Drita	103	(5)
2022–2023	Dečić	39	(3)
2023–	Flamurtari	17	(1)

International career^{‡}
2008	Albania U19	1	(0)
2010–2011	Albania U21	8	(0)
- * Club domestic league appearances and goals as of 1 June 2024 ‡ National team caps and goals as of 13 August 2015

Erjon Vucaj (born 25 December 1990) is an Albanian professional footballer who plays as a midfielder for Flamurtari.

Grown up as a player at Vllaznia Shkodër, he has spent three years at Laçi, proving to be a pivotal player for this team's midfield and notably bringing the team to the qualifiers of the 2010–11 UEFA Europa League. In July 2012 he was loaned to Skënderbeu Korçë for their UEFA Champions League qualification campaign. He received second place, after winner Bekim Balaj, of an individual prestigious prize given from the sports association "Sporti na bashkon" to the best football talents of the Superliga's 2011–12 season. At the beginning of the 2012–13 season Laçi's coach promoted Vuçaj to team captain, which made him the youngest captain of the Superliga.

Vucaj represented Albania at youth levels, playing for the under-19, and -21 levels. He was called up for the first time to the senior team in August 2012 but did not make his debut.

== Club career ==
=== Vllaznia Shkodër ===
Vucaj began his career at his local club Vllaznia Shkodër as a youth, where he was eventually promoted to the senior team by the coach Mirel Josa during the 2007–08 season. Josa handed Vucaj his professional debut on 14 May 2008, during the penultimate game of the season against Dinamo Tirana. He came on at half time in a match which ended in a 3–0 defeat for Vucaj's side. That game proved to be his first and only league appearance for Vllaznia.

Josa left the club right before the 2008–09 season, with Agim Canaj taking over as manager. The change of coach made it difficult for Vucaj to break into the first team. His only appearances during the entire 2008–09 season came in both legs of the Albanian Cup first round against Sopoti Librazhd, which Vllaznia won 8–1 on aggregate. At the end of the season Vucaj refused to sign a new three-year contract at the club when his current deal ended in one year on 30 August 2010. He was not included in the club's mini pre-season training plans and was eventually given permission from the directors to leave the club.

=== Laçi ===
Vucaj spent the following three seasons (2009–10, 2010–11, and 2011–12) at Laçi during which he logged 69 presences and scored 5 goals. In the first season with Laçi he contributed to an unexpected historical qualification of Laçi to the 2010–11 UEFA Europa League, being fourth. In the 2010–11 season, Laçi was again fourth in the Superliga, but failed to qualify for the Europa League, whereas in the 2011–12 season Laçi came 8th within the 14 teams of Superliga. During this season Vucaj left his mark especially in a game against his former home team, Vllaznia, when he was declared the best player of the match. In that game Vucaj scored the decisive goal and was confirmed as the decisive leader of his team.

At the end of the 2011–12 season, Vucaj received the second prize dedicated to the best football talents of Albania for 2011–12 from the sports association "Sporti na bashkon", the first prize being awarded to Bekim Balaj.

In July 2012 Vucaj joined the Superliga champions Skënderbeu Korçë as a loan for their UEFA Champions League qualification campaign. He went on trial at their summer training camp in Austria, and coach Stanislav Levý was impressed after seeing him in two consecutive friendlies against Torpedo Kutaisi and Vaslui. This led to an agreement struck between Laçi and Skënderbeu to allow Vuçaj to be sent out loan for the European qualification campaign.

In the beginning of the 2012–13 season, it was reported that Vucaj became the captain of Laçi, which is going to make him the youngest player in the Superliga with the honor of captaining a team.

=== Flamurtari Vlorë ===
On 13 August 2014, Vucaj joined fellow Albanian Superliga side Flamurtari Vlorë by signing a two-year contract, taking the squad number 25 in the process. He made his league debut with the club later ten days later in the opening match against Teuta Durrës, where Flamurtari emerged victorious by winning 2–1. Throughout the season Vucaj would appear in 34 matches in all competitions, including 32 in league, failing to score in the process. He left the team in August 2015 after claiming that he was not paid by the club during his time there, sending the issue to the "Conflict Settlement Chamber" of AFA, becoming a free agent in the process.

=== Tirana ===
On 12 August 2015, after becoming a free agent following the trail win over Flamurtari Vlorë, Vuçaj signed with the most successful team of Albania, Tirana, for an undisclosed fee. On 17 October 2015, he scored his first goal against his former club Flamurtari Vlorë in the opening moments of the game in the Qemal Stafa Stadium. Vucaj was sent off after receiving a second yellow card in a 2–1 away defeat to Kukësi in the last day of the Albanian Superliga season.

=== Return to Laçi ===
On 10 January 2017, Vucaj completed a transfer to Laçi as a free agent, signing a contract until the end of the season, returning in Laç after three years. He was again named team captain, and made his return debut on 28 January in the 0–1 win at Korabi Peshkopi. Vucaj scored his first goal of the season, his first Albanian Superliga goal in over a year, in the matchday 34 in a 3–0 home win over Vllaznia Shkodër, netting the opener via a penalty kick. Laç escaped the relegation only on the final matchday by winning 2–1 at home versus Teuta Durrës, a match which Vucaj missed due to injury. He made 15 league appearances during the second half of the season, all of them as starter, in addition 2 cup matches. He left the team August 2017.

=== Return to Vllaznia Shkodër ===
On 27 August 2017, Vucaj returned to his boyhood club Vllaznia Shkodër by agreeing a deal for the next two seasons. Immediately after signing the contract, Vucaj flew out to Berane, Montenegro to link up with the rest of the squad on their summer training camp. He was handed squad number 20, and made his first appearance of the season in the opening matchday against newbie Lushnja which finished 2–0 for Vucaj's side. He scored his first ever Vllaznia goal on 27 September in the returning leg of 2017–18 Albanian Cup first round over Kastrioti Krujë to help his side win 4–0 and to progress to next round. Vucaj concluded the 2017–18 season by playing 32 games in league as Vllaznia was relegated for the first time in 60 years.

==== Loan to Luftëtari Gjirokastër ====
On 8 July 2018, Vucaj was sent on a short-term loan at Luftëtari Gjirokastër for their UEFA Europa League campaign. He played his first Europa League match in three years four days later in the first leg of first qualifying round versus Latvia's Ventspils which ended in a 5–0 crushing defeat. He also played in the second leg which confirmed Luftëtari's elimination from the competition 8–3 on aggregate. Following Luftëtari's elimination, Vucaj returned to Vllaznia ahead of the new season.

=== Drita ===
On 17 August 2018, Vucaj signed with Kosovo's Drita for the 2018–19 season.

== International career ==
Vucaj received his first senior international call-up from Albania's coach, Gianni De Biasi for a friendly of against Moldova on 15 August 2012. In an interview to the Panorama Sport newspaper, Vuçaj said that he was extremely happy about De Biasi's call. He was an unused substitute in the goalless draw.

== Career statistics ==
=== Club ===
As of 2 December 2018

Club statistics
Club	Season	League			Cup		Europe		Other		Total	
Club	Season	Division	Apps	Goals	Apps	Goals	Apps	Goals	Apps	Goals	Apps	Goals
Vllaznia Shkodër	2007–08	Albanian Superliga	1	0	0	0	—		—		1	0
Vllaznia Shkodër	2008–09	Albanian Superliga	0	0	2	0	—		—		2	0
Vllaznia Shkodër	Total		1	0	2	0	—		—		3	0
Laçi	2009–10	Albanian Superliga	20	1	2	0	—		—		22	1
Laçi	2010–11	Albanian Superliga	29	0	2	0	2 (Note: All appearance(s) in UEFA Europa League)	0	—		33	1
Laçi	2011–12	Albanian Superliga	20	4	9	2	—		—		29	6
Laçi	2012–13	Albanian Superliga	24	8	10	3	—		—		34	12
Laçi	2013–14	Albanian Superliga	29	8	6	2	2	0	1 (Note: All appearance(s) in Albanian Supercup)	0	38	10
Laçi	2013–14	Albanian Superliga	—		—		3	0	—		3	0
Laçi	Total		122	21	29	7	7	0	1	0	159	28
Skënderbeu Korçë (loan)	2012–13	Albanian Superliga	—		—		2 (Note: All appearance(s) in UEFA Champions League)	0	—		2	0
Flamurtari Vlorë	2014–15	Albanian Superliga	32	0	1	0	—		1	0	33	0
Laçi (loan)	2015–16	Albanian Superliga	—		—		2	0	—		2	0
Tirana	2015–16	Albanian Superliga	20	1	2	1	—		—		22	1
Tirana	2016–17	Albanian Superliga	10	0	2	1	—		—		12	1
Tirana	Total		30	1	4	1	—		—		34	2
Laçi	2016–17	Albanian Superliga	15	1	2	0	—		—		17	1
Vllaznia Shkodër	2017–18	Albanian Superliga	32	1	4	1	—		—		36	2
Vllaznia Shkodër	2018–19	Albanian First Division	0	0	0	0	—		—		0	0
Vllaznia Shkodër	Total		32	1	4	1	—		—		36	2
Vllaznia Shkodër B (loan)	2017–18	Albanian First Division	—		—		—		1 (Note: All appearance(s) in Albanian First Division relegation play-off)	0	2	0
Luftëtari Gjirokastër (loan)	2018–19	Albanian Superliga	—		—		2	0	—		2	0
Drita	2018–19	Superleague of Kosovo	14	0	—		—		—		14	0
Career total			246	24	42	10	13	0	3	0	304	34

== Honours ==
Vllaznia Shkodër

- Albanian Cup: 2007–08

Laçi

- Albanian Cup: 2012–13
