= David Domgjoni =

Kosovan professional footballer

Personal information
- Full name: David Nue Domgjonas
- Date of birth: 21 May 1997 (age 29)
- Place of birth: Prizren, FR Yugoslavia
- Height: 1.88 m (6 ft 2 in)
- Position: Centre-back

Team information
- Current team: Hapoel Jerusalem
- Number: 66

Youth career
- –2013: Liria Prizren
- 2013–2014: Shkëndija Tiranë
- 2014–2016: Tirana

Senior career*
Years	Team	Apps	(Gls)
2014–2018	Tirana	14	(0)
2016	→ Kastrioti (loan)	13	(2)
2017–2018	→ Liria Prizren (loan)	30	(1)
2018–2019	Kastrioti	14	(0)
2019–2020	Laçi	28	(1)
2020–2021	Menemenspor	40	(3)
2021–2022	Luzern	6	(0)
2022	Bruk-Bet Termalica	8	(0)
2022–2024	Manisa	40	(1)
2024	Tobol	5	(0)
2024–2025	Partizani	22	(0)
2025–	Hapoel Jerusalem	20	(0)

International career
2014	Albania U17	3	(0)
2015	Albania U19	1	(0)
2021	Kosovo	3	(0)
- * Club domestic league appearances and goals as of 24 June 2026

David Nue Domgjonas (born 21 May 1997), commonly known as David Domgjoni, is a Kosovan professional footballer who plays as a centre-back for Israeli club Hapoel Jerusalem.

== Club career ==
=== Tirana ===
On 2 July 2014, Domgjoni signed his first professional contract with Kategoria Superiore side Tirana after agreeing to a five-year deal. Three months later, he made his debut with Tirana in the 2014–15 Albanian Cup first round against Sopoti after being named in the starting line-up.

==== Loan at Kastrioti ====
On 22 January 2016, Domgjoni was loaned out to Kategoria e Parë club Kastrioti until the end of the 2015–16 season. On 13 February 2016, he made his debut in a 3–0 home win against Ada after being named in the starting line-up.

==== Return to Liria as loan ====
On 24 August 2017, Domgjoni joined as loan to Football Superleague of Kosovo side Liria Prizren. Fourteen days later, the club confirmed that he had joined on a season-long loan. Two days after joining, Domgjoni made his debut in a 1–0 away defeat against Prishtina after being named in the starting line-up.

=== Return to Kastrioti ===
On 8 August 2018, Domgjoni signed a one-year contract with Kategoria Superiore club Kastrioti. Ten days later, he made his debut in a 0–1 away win against Luftëtari after coming on as a substitute at 61st minute in place of Juljan Shehu.

=== Laçi ===
On 31 January 2019, Domgjoni signed a two-year contract with Kategoria Superiore club Laçi. Seventeen days later, he made his debut in a 1–0 home win against Partizani Tirana after coming on as a substitute at last minutes in place of Regi Lushkja.

=== Menemenspor ===
On 31 January 2020, Domgjoni signed a two-and-a-half-year contract with TFF First League club Menemenspor. Ten days later, he made his debut in a 2–2 away draw against Akhisarspor after being named in the starting line-up.

=== Luzern ===
On 28 July 2021, Domgjoni signed a two-year contract with Swiss Super League club Luzern. Four days later, he was named as a Luzern substitute for the first time in a league match against St. Gallen. His debut with Luzern came four days later in the 2021–22 UEFA Europa Conference League third qualifying round against Dutch side Feyenoord after coming on as a substitute at 63rd minute in place of Patrick Farkas. Three days after debut, Domgjoni made his league debut in a 1–3 home defeat against Zürich after coming on as a substitute at 55th minute in place of Holger Badstuber.

=== Bruk-Bet Termalica ===
On 2 February 2022, Domgjoni signed a one-year contract with Ekstraklasa club Bruk-Bet Termalica Nieciecza. His debut with Termalica came two days later in a 2–1 home win against Jagiellonia Białystok after coming on as a substitute at 73rd minute in place of Kacper Śpiewak.

=== Manisa ===
On 23 July 2022, Domgjoni signed a two-year contract with TFF First League club Manisa. His debut with Manisa came on 13 August in a 0–1 home defeat against Boluspor after being named in the starting line-up.

== International career ==
=== Albania ===
==== Under-17 ====
In December 2012, Domgjoni received a call-up from Albania U17 for a selection camp in Pristina, Kosovo from 3–4 December 2012. On 23 March 2014, he was named as part of the Albania U17 squad for 2014 UEFA European Under-17 Championship elite round. Three days later, Domgjoni made his debut with Albania U17 in a 2014 UEFA European Under-17 Championship elite round match against Italy U17 after being named in the starting line-up.

==== Under-19 ====
On 5 March 2015, Domgjoni was named as part of the Albania U19 squad for Roma Caput Mundi. Four days later, he made his debut with Albania U19 in a match against Malta U19 after being named in the starting line-up and scored own goal during a 0–1 home defeat.

==== Period as unused substitute ====
Domgjoni after the debuts made with Albania U17 and U19, where he played with these teams in three official matches, came the period as an unused substitute and this happened during the matches that were called by Albania U21 in the friendly match against Italy U21 in August 2016, and by Albania U20 in the unofficial friendly matches against Azerbaijan U21 in January 2018.

=== Kosovo ===
On 31 May 2021, Domgjoni received a call-up from Kosovo for the friendly matches against Guinea and Gambia. Eight days later, he made his debut with Kosovo in a friendly match against Guinea after being named in the starting line-up.

== Personal life ==
Domgjoni was born in Prizren, FR Yugoslavia from Kosovo Albanian parents. On 18 February 2014, he obtained Albanian passport.

== Career statistics ==
=== Club ===
As of 13 August 2022

Appearances and goals by club, season and competition
Club	Season	League			National cup (Note: Includes Albanian Cup, Swiss Cup)		Continental		Other		Total	
Club	Season	Division	Apps	Goals	Apps	Goals	Apps	Goals	Apps	Goals	Apps	Goals
Tirana	2014–15	Kategoria Superiore	0	0	2	0	—		—		2	0
Tirana	2015–16	Kategoria Superiore	1	0	3	0	—		—		4	0
Tirana	2016–17	Kategoria Superiore	13	0	3	0	—		—		16	0
Tirana	2017–18	Kategoria e Parë	0	0	0	0	1 (Note: Appearance(s) in UEFA Europa League)	0	—		1	0
Tirana	Total		14	0	8	0	1	0	—		23	3
Kastrioti (loan)	2015–16	Kategoria e Parë	13	2	0	0	—		—		13	2
Liria Prizren (loan)	2017–18	Kosovo Superleague	30	1	0	0	—		—		30	1
Kastrioti	2018–19	Kategoria Superiore	14	0	1	0	—		—		15	0
Laçi	2018–19	Kategoria Superiore	10	1	1	0	—		—		11	1
Laçi	2019–20	Kategoria Superiore	18	0	1	0	2	0	—		21	0
Laçi	Total		42	1	3	0	2	0	—		47	1
Menemenspor	2019–20	TFF First League	12	1	0	0	—		—		12	1
Menemenspor	2020–21	TFF First League	28	2	0	0	—		—		28	2
Menemenspor	Total		40	3	0	0	—		—		40	3
Luzern	2021–22	Swiss Super League	6	0	1	0	2 (Note: Appearances in UEFA Europa Conference League)	0	—		9	0
Bruk-Bet Termalica	2021–22	Ekstraklasa	8	0	—		—		—		8	0
Manisa	2022–23	TFF First League	1	0	0	0	—		—		1	0
Career total			154	7	12	0	5	0	0	0	171	7

=== International ===
Appearances and goals by national team and year
National team	Year	Apps	Goals
Kosovo
Kosovo	2021	3	0
Total		3	0

== Honours ==
Tirana

- Albanian Cup: 2016–17
