= Marvin Turtulli =

Albanian footballer

Personal information
- Date of birth: 17 October 1994 (age 32)
- Place of birth: Lezhë, Albania
- Height: 1.93 m (6 ft 4 in)
- Position: Centre-back

Youth career
- 2011–2013: Dinamo Tirana

Senior career*
Years	Team	Apps	(Gls)
2013–2014	Dinamo Tirana	32	(6)
2014	Teuta Durrës	3	(0)
2015–2016	Dinamo Tirana	19	(0)
2016	Kukësi	0	(0)
2016	Kukësi B	1	(0)
2016	Dinamo Tirana	11	(0)
2016–2019	Tirana	53	(3)
2019–2020	Skënderbeu	6	(0)

International career
2012–2013	Albania U19	1	(0)
2013	Albania U20	5	(1)
- * Club domestic league appearances and goals

Marvin Turtulli (born 17 October 1994) is an Albanian former professional footballer who played as a centre-back.

== Club career ==
=== Early career ===
Turtulli started his youth career at FK Dinamo Tirana academies in 2011 and was placed immediately in the under-19 team. In the 2011–12 U-19 championship he played 18 matches mostly as a starter. He retained his place at under-19 side in the next season 2012–13 and in March 2013 he became part of the first team in the 2012–13 Albanian First Division.

Turtulli enjoyed a prolific form during 2013–14 season, scoring 5 times in 26 league appearances.

=== Teuta Durrës ===
Turtulli left Dinamo in June 2014 to sign with Albanian Superliga side Teuta Durrës. He made his Teuta debut on 1 October in the first leg of 2014–15 Albanian Cup first round against Besëlidhja Lezhë which finished 2–0 for Turtulli's side. He made his first Albanian Superliga appearance four days later by playing in the last 5 minutes of the 1–0 away loss to Kukësi. During the first part of season, Turtulli played only 32 minutes from 3 appearances as substitute in league before leaving the club in January 2015.

=== Dinamo Tirana ===
On 31 January 2015, Turtulli returned to his first club Dinamo on a one-year contract. He managed to play 7 league matches during the second part of 2014–15 season, as Dinamo once again avoided relegation. He continued to play as starter in the next season, making 23 league appearances, scoring no goals.

=== Kukësi ===
Turtulli joined top flight side Kukësi on 22 January 2016 for an undisclosed fee. He featured as an unused substitute in Kukësi's 2015–16 Albanian Cup quarter-final match against Teuta Durrës just one day later. He also played one match for the reserve squad on 25 January in the 2–3 loss to Vllaznia Shkodër B in the Albanian Third Division. Turtulli terminated his contract with the club unilaterally on 5 February 2016, just less than 2 weeks after joining due to limited playing time.

=== Tirana ===
On 9 July 2016, Turtulli completed a transfer to fellow capital side Tirana by penning a contract until June 2019. He spent 2016–17 season mostly on the bench, making only 13 league appearances as Tirana was relegated for the first time in history after finishing 9th. He also played 6 matches in team's successful cup campaign as Tirana won it for 16th time after defeating KF Skënderbeu Korçë 3–1 in final. It was Turtulli's first career silverware.

Turtulli started his second Tirana season in July 2017 by playing in the 2017–18 UEFA Europa League first qualifying round against Maccabi Tel Aviv. He played full-90 minutes in both legs as Tirana was eliminated 5–0 on aggregate. Later on 6 September, Turtulli played full-90 minutes as Tirana won Albanian Supercup for the 11th time after beating Kukësi 1–0 at Selman Stërmasi Stadium. Later that month, Turtulli confirmed that he will stay at Tirana to help the club return to top flight.

== International career ==
=== Albania U20 ===
Turtulli was called up at Albania national under-20 football team by coach Skënder Gega to participate in the 2013 Mediterranean Games football tournament which began on 19 June 2013 in Mersin, Turkey. He played in all 5 Albania U20s matches as a starter, 4 of them for full 90-minutes. He scored 1 goal in the Preliminary round group A matchday 2 against Bosnia and Herzegovina on 21 June to help Albania to take a 2–2 draw. Albania U20 was ranked in the last place out of 8 teams.

== Style of play ==
Apart from his natural position as centre-back, Turtulli can also be deployed as right-back.

== Career statistics ==
As of 4 November 2017

Club statistics
Club	Season	League			Cup		Continental		Other		Total	
Club	Season	Division	Apps	Goals	Apps	Goals	Apps	Goals	Apps	Goals	Apps	Goals
Dinamo Tirana	2012–13	Albanian First Division	6	1	0	0	—		—		6	1
Dinamo Tirana	2013–14	Albanian First Division	26	5	0	0	—		—		25	5
Dinamo Tirana	Total		32	6	0	0	—		—		32	6
Teuta Durrës	2014–15	Albanian Superliga	3	0	2	0	—		—		5	0
Dinamo Tirana	2014–15	Albanian First Division	7	0	0	0	—		—		7	0
Dinamo Tirana	2015–16	Albanian First Division	23	0	0	0	—		—		23	0
Dinamo Tirana	Total		30	0	0	0	—		—		30	0
Kukësi	2015–16	Albanian Superliga	0	0	0	0	—		—		0	0
Kukësi B	2015–16	Albanian Third Division	1	0	0	0	—		—		1	0
Tirana	2016–17	Albanian Superliga	13	1	6	0	—		—		19	1
Tirana	2017–18	Albanian First Division	6	0	1	0	2 (Note: All appearance(s) in UEFA Europa League)	0	1 (Note: Appearance in Albanian Supercup)	0	10	0
Tirana	Total		19	1	7	0	2	0	1	0	29	1
Career total			85	7	9	0	2	0	1	0	97	7

== Honours ==
Tirana

- Albanian Cup: 2016–17
- Albanian Supercup: 2017
- Albanian First Division : Winner Group B
- Albanian First Division : 2017-2018
