= Reuben Acquah =

Ghanaian professional footballer

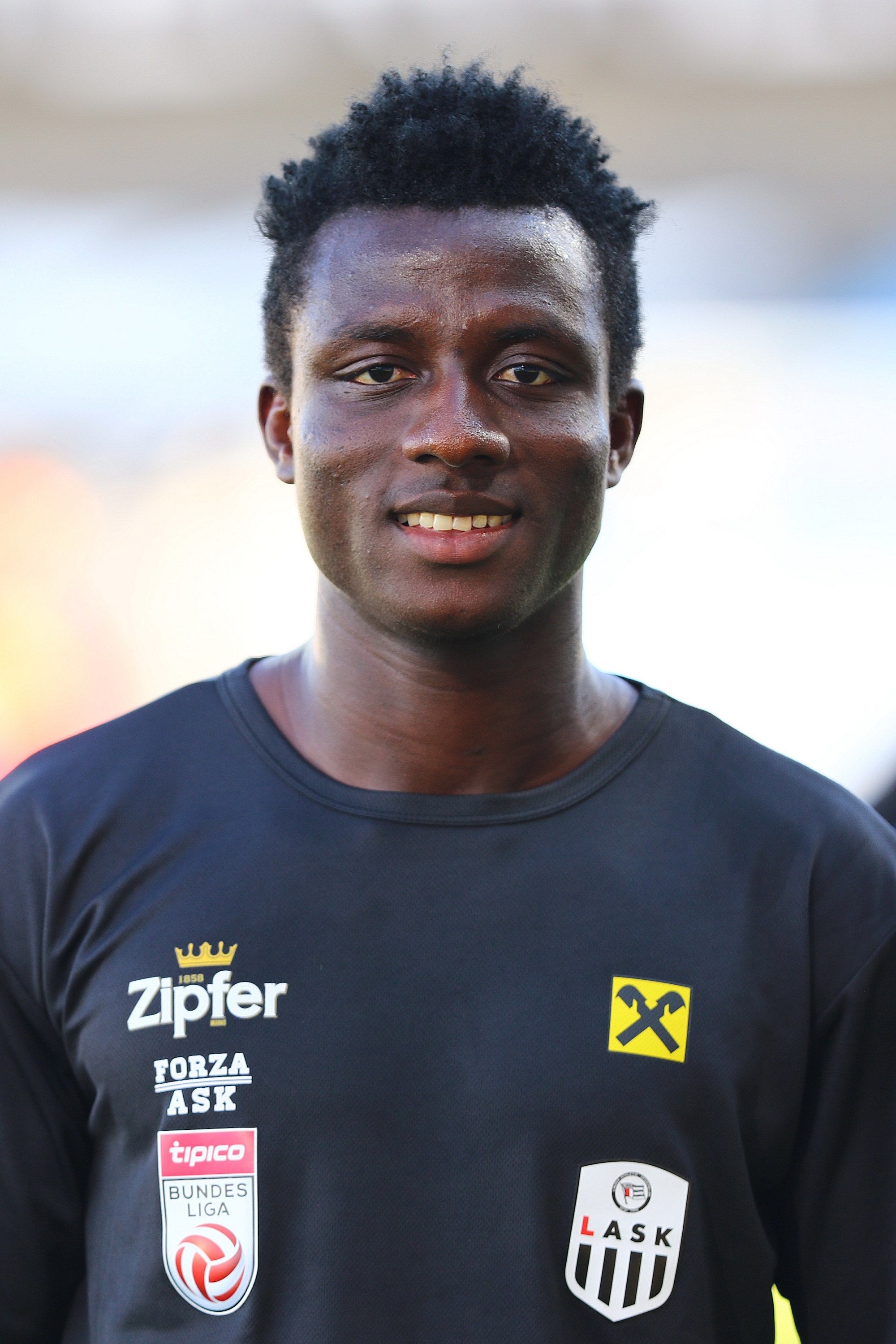
- Acquah with LASK Linz in 2018

Personal information
- Date of birth: 3 November 1996 (age 30)
- Place of birth: Accra, Ghana
- Height: 1.82 m (6 ft 0 in)
- Position: Defensive midfielder

Youth career
- Red Bull Ghana
- 2016: Mechelen

Senior career*
Years	Team	Apps	(Gls)
2013	Red Bull Ghana		
2014–2015	Liberty Professionals		
2016	KV Mechelen	0	(0)
2016–2019	LASK Linz	0	(0)
2016–2017	→ Tirana (loan)	23	(0)
2017	→ Dunajská Streda B (loan)		
2018	→ Juniors OÖ (loan)	7	(1)
2019	→ TSV Hartberg (loan)	1	(0)
2019–2020	SV Ried	23	(0)
2020–2021	Lokomotiva	3	(0)
2021–2022	Teuta	25	(0)
2023	Al-Sinaa		
2023–2025	Duhok		
2025	Bnei Sakhnin	0	(0)
- * Club domestic league appearances and goals as of 26 May 2025

Reuben Acquah (born 3 November 1996) is a Ghanaian professional footballer who plays as a defensive midfielder.

== Career statistics ==
As of 30 November 2016

Club	Season	League			Cup		Continental		Total	
Club	Season	Division	Apps	Goals	Apps	Goals	Apps	Goals	Apps	Goals
Tirana	2016–17	Albanian Superliga	9	0	2	0	—		11	0
Dunajská Streda	2017–18	Slovak Super Liga	0	0	0	0	—		0	0
Career total			9	0	2	0	—		11	0

== Honours ==
Tirana

- Albanian Cup: 2016–17

Duhok

- AGCFF Gulf Club Champions League: 2024–25
