= Fjoralb Deliaj =

Albanian professional footballer

Personal information
- Date of birth: 4 April 1997 (age 29)
- Place of birth: Vlorë, Albania
- Height: 1.81 m (5 ft 11 in)
- Position: Midfielder

Team information
- Current team: Lushnja
- Number: 4

Youth career
- 2007–2015: Flamurtari
- 2015–2016: Tirana

Senior career*
Years	Team	Apps	(Gls)
2016–2017	Tirana	18	(0)
2017–2020	Flamurtari	48	(0)
2020	Struga	3	(0)
2020–2021	Kastrioti	24	(0)
2021–2022	Läberia	0	(0)
2022–2023	Oriku	25	(1)
2023–2024	Flamurtari	31	(2)
2024–	Lushnja	6	(0)
- * Club domestic league appearances and goals as of 2 October 2024

Fjoralb Deliaj (born 4 April 1997) is an Albanian professional footballer who plays as a midfielder for Lushnja.

== Club career ==
Deliaj was promoted to Flamurtari Vlorë senior squad during 2014–15 season where he made only one cup appearance, playing the second half of the second round match against Veleçiku Koplik on 5 November 2014.

The following season he joined Tirana as a free agent, making his first Albanian Superliga appearance on 13 March 2016 in the Albania derby against Vllaznia Shkodër which was lost 3–1. One month later, he agreed a contract extension, signing until June 2019. Deliaj finished his first Tirana season by making 11 league appearances, as Tirana finished 5th in championship.

In July 2016, Deliaj suffered a knee injury which kept him sidelined for the next three weeks. He missed the start of championship. During the 2016–17 season, his minutes were reduced, as he played 7 league matches and 5 cup matches, as Tirana was relegated for the first time in history and won Albanian Cup for the 16th time, setting a new record. It was also Deliaj's first career silverware.

In July 2017, Deliaj made his European debut by playing in the two-legged match against Hapoel Tel Aviv, collecting 49 minutes from 2 appearances as substitute as Tirana was eliminated from 2017–18 UEFA Europa League first qualifying round 0–5 on aggregate. He left the club on 25 August 2017 after being told by manager Zé Maria that he was not in his plans.

On 7 September 2017, Deliaj returned to his boyhood club Flamurtari Vlorë. He scored his first Flamurtari goal on 27 September in the returning leg of 2017–18 Albanian Cup first round against Dinamo Tirana as the team progressed 6–1 on aggregate. He made his first Albanian Superliga appearance for Flamurtari on 22 December 2017 by playing in the last 11 minutes of a 0–3 win at Kamza in the matchday 16.

== Style of play ==
Naturally a midfielder, Deliaj can also be deployed as defender.

== Career statistics ==
As of 27 September 2017

Club statistics
Club	Season	League			Cup		Europe		Total	
Club	Season	Division	Apps	Goals	Apps	Goals	Apps	Goals	Apps	Goals
Flamurtari Vlorë	2014–15	Albanian Superliga	0	0	1	0	—		1	0
Tirana	2015–16	Albanian Superliga	11	0	0	0	—		11	0
Tirana	2016–17	Albanian Superliga	7	0	5	0	—		12	0
Tirana	2017–18	Albanian Superliga	0	0	0	0	2 (Note: All appearance(s) in UEFA Europa League)	0	2	0
Tirana	Total		18	0	5	0	2	0	25	0
Tirana B	2016–17	Albanian Superliga	6	3	0	0	—		6	3
Flamurtari Vlorë	2017–18	Albanian Superliga	0	0	2	1	—		2	1
Career total			24	3	8	1	2	0	34	4

== Honours ==
Tirana

- Albanian Cup: 2016–17
