= Flamur Dzelili =

Swedish footballer (born 1999)

Personal information
- Date of birth: 9 September 1999 (age 27)
- Place of birth: Myresjö, Sweden
- Height: 1.83 m (6 ft 0 in)
- Position: Winger

Team information
- Current team: Bashkimi
- Number: 11

Youth career
- Myresjö/Vetlanda FK
- –2016: Kalmar FF
- 2017–2018: Östers IF

Senior career*
Years	Team	Apps	(Gls)
2017	Kalmar AIK	12	(4)
2017–2018	Östers IF	0	(0)
2019–2021	Oskarshamns AIK	62	(12)
2019	→ Högsby IK (loan)	12	(3)
2022	Varbergs BoIS	3	(0)
2023	Jönköpings Södra	21	(1)
2024–2025	AB	23	(1)
2025	Holbæk B&I	4	(4)
2025–	Bashkimi	6	(0)
- * Club domestic league appearances and goals as of 13:40, 1 February 2025 (UTC)

Flamur Dzelili (Albanian: Flamur Xhelili; born 9 September 1999) is a Swedish professional footballer who plays as a winger for Macedonian club Bashkimi.

== Club career ==
=== Varbergs BoIS ===
On 10 December 2021, Dzelili signed a two-year precontract with Allsvenskan club Varbergs BoIS and this transfer would become legally effective in January 2022. On 19 February 2022, he was named as a Varbergs BoIS substitute for the first time in the 2021–22 Svenska Cupen group stage against Sollentuna FK. His debut with Varbergs BoIS came on 2 October 2022 in a 1–1 home draw against BK Häcken after coming on as a substitute at last minutes in place of André Boman.

=== Jönköpings Södra IF ===
On 19 January 2023, Dzelili signed a two-year contract with Superettan club Jönköpings Södra IF. His debut with Jönköpings Södra IF came a month later in the 2022–23 Svenska Cupen group stage against BK Häcken after coming on as a substitute at 65th minute in place of Taylor Silverholt. Seven days after debut, Dzelili scored his first goal for Jönköpings Södra IF in his second appearance for the club in a 3–1 away defeat over Halmstads BK in 2022–23 Svenska Cupen group stage.

=== Denmark ===
On 9 January 2024, Dzelili joined Danish 2nd Division club Akademisk Boldklub on a deal until June 2026. After four goals in 24 games, the club confirmed on January 27, 2025 that the parties had terminated the contract by mutual agreement.

At the end of February 2025, Dzelili signed with Danish 3rd Division side Holbæk B&I.

=== Bashkimi ===
In July 2025, Dzelili moved to Macedonian club Bashkimi.
