= Grent Halili =

Albanian footballer

Personal information
- Full name: Grent Refik Halili
- Date of birth: 24 May 1998 (age 28)
- Place of birth: Tirana, Albania
- Height: 1.81 m (5 ft 11 in)
- Position: Forward

Youth career
- 2011–2017: Tirana
- 2013: → Varese (loan)

Senior career*
Years	Team	Apps	(Gls)
2014–2021	Tirana	118	(9)
Total		118	(9)

International career
2016	Albania U19	1	(0)
2017	Albania U21	2	(0)
- * Club domestic league appearances and goals

Grent Refik Halili (born 24 May 1998) is an Albanian former professional footballer who played as a forward. Throughout his career he has played for Tirana and he is the son of Tirana's owner and president Refik Halili.

== Club career ==
=== Early career ===
Halili started his youth career at KF Tirana in 2011.

In May 2013 he went on trial at Italian club Varese alongside fellow KF Tirana youth player Marko Çema as part of a collaboration between the two clubs.

=== Tirana ===
Halili was promoted to the senior team at KF Tirana by coach Gugash Magani during the 2014–15 season where he made his professional debut in the Albanian Cup against Sopoti Librazhd, where he also scored his first goal. He signed a four–year contract with KF Tirana along with fellow youth player David Domgjoni on 1 April 2015, keeping him at the club until 2019.

Halili scored his first league goal for Tirana on 18 November 2017 in the matchday 8 of the 2017–18 Albanian First Division against Apolonia Fier and Tirana took a 2–0 victory.

He sacked the coaches Egbo and Dede for not including him at the starting 11. Halili's nickname is Gaucho Junior, due to similarities with Brazilian legend Ronaldinho.

== International career ==
=== Albania U19 ===
Halili was called up at Albania national under-19 football team by coach Arjan Bellaj at the pre-eleminary squad for the 2017 UEFA European Under-19 Championship qualification from 6–11 October 2016.

=== Albania U21 ===
Halili was called up at the Albania national under-21 football team by coach Alban Bushi for a double Friendly match against Moldova U21 on 25 & 27 March 2017.

==== 2019 UEFA European Under-21 Championship qualification ====
Halili was called up for the Friendly match against France U21 on 5 June 2017 and the 2019 UEFA European Under-21 Championship qualification opening match against Estonia U21 on 12 June 2017. He was not part of the 18-man squad which featured in the opening match of the qualifiers on 12 June against Estonia U21.

== Career statistics ==
=== Club ===
As of 22 December 2017

Club statistics
Club	Season	League			Cup		Europe (Note: Including continental competitions, such as UEFA Champions League and UEFA Europa League)		Other (Note: Including other competitions, such as Albanian Supercup)		Total	
Club	Season	Division	Apps	Goals	Apps	Goals	Apps	Goals	Apps	Goals	Apps	Goals
Tirana	2014–15	Albanian Superliga	2	0	4	2	—		—		6	2
Tirana	2015–16	Albanian Superliga	12	0	2	1	—		—		14	1
Tirana	2016–17	Albanian Superliga	15	0	8	3	—		—		23	3
Tirana	2017–18	Albanian First Division	8	2	4	0	0	0	1 (Note: One appearance in the 2017 Albanian Supercup)	0	13	2
Tirana	Total		37	2	18	6	0	0	1	0	56	8
Tirana B	2016–17	Albanian Second Division	2	0	—		—		—		2	0
Tirana B	2017–18	Albanian Second Division	2	0	—		—		—		2	0
Tirana B	Total		4	0	—		—		—		4	0
Career total			39	1	17	6	0	0	1	0	57	7

== Personal life ==
His father Refik Halili is owner of the club where he plays KF Tirana.

== Honours ==
=== Club ===
Tirana

- Albanian Superliga: 2019–20
- Albanian Cup: 2016–17
- Albanian Supercup: 2017
- Albanian First Division : Winner Group B
- Albanian First Division : 2017-2018
