= Romuald Ntsitsigui =

Gabonese footballer

Personal information
- Full name: Romuald Ntsitsigui Ewouta
- Date of birth: 8 April 1991 (age 35)
- Place of birth: Moanda, Gabon
- Height: 1.80 m (5 ft 11 in)
- Position: Striker

Team information
- Current team: Mangasport

Senior career*
Years	Team	Apps	(Gls)
2011–2016	Mangasport		
2016–2017	Tirana	6	(0)
2018–	Mangasport		

International career^{‡}
2015–	Gabon	17	(0)
- * Club domestic league appearances and goals ‡ National team caps and goals as of 2 December 2016

Romuald Ntsitsigui Ewouta (born 8 April 1991) is a Gabonese footballer who plays as a striker for Gabonese club Mangasport and the Gabon national team.

== Honours ==
Mangasport

- Gabon Championnat National D1: 2013–14, 2014–15, 2018

Tirana

- Albanian Cup: 2016–17
