= Ifeanyi Edeh =

Nigerian footballer (born 1990)

Ifeanyi Ede
Personal information
- Full name: Ifeanyi Benjamin Ede
- Date of birth: 5 December 1990 (age 35)
- Place of birth: Lagos, Nigeria
- Height: 1.87 m (6 ft 2 in)
- Position: Forward

Senior career*
Years	Team	Apps	(Gls)
2008–2010	Ocean Boys	15	(8)
2010–2012	Enyimba	17	(8)
2012	Enugu Rangers	12	(7)
2013–2016	Enyimba	52	(28)
2016–2017	Tirana	21	(6)
2017–2018	Al-Nasr		
2018–2019	Fasil Kenema		

International career
2013–2014	Nigeria	9	(4)
- * Club domestic league appearances and goals as of 20:55, 15 February 2019 (UTC)

Ifeanyi Benjamin Ede (born 5 December 1990) is a Nigerian professional footballer who plays as a forward.

== Club career ==
=== Tirana ===
On 19 August 2016, Ede completed a transfer to Albania's most successful club Tirana as a free agent, signing a two-year contract. He was presented on the same day along with Romuald Ntsitsigui where he was allocated squad number 11. He made his debut a day later in the friendly against Apolonia Fier where he also netted his first goal. contributing in a 2–0 win at Selman Stërmasi Stadium. Later on 7 September, Ede played his first competitive match in the opening league match against Teuta Durrës which finished in a goalless draw; he played full-90 minutes. He scored his first goal in the matchday 5 against Flamurtari Vlorë, helping Tirana to get the first win of the season after four consecutive draws.

== International career ==
In January 2014, coach Stephen Keshi, invited Ede to be included in the Nigeria national football team for the 2014 African Nations Championship. He helped the team to a third-place finish after Nigeria beat Zimbabwe by a goal to nil.

== Career statistics ==
=== Club ===
As of 15 February 2019

Appearances and goals by club, season and competition
Club	Season	League			Cup		Continental		Total	
Club	Season	Division	Apps	Goals	Apps	Goals	Apps	Goals	Apps	Goals
Tirana	2016–17	Albanian Superliga	26	6	1	1	—		27	2
Career total			26	6	1	1	—		27	2

=== International ===
Appearances and goals by national team and year
National team	Year	Apps	Goals
Nigeria	2013	3	1
Nigeria	2014	6	3
Total		9	4

Scores and results list Nigeria's goal tally first, score column indicates score after each Edeh goal.

List of international goals scored by Ifeanyi Edeh
No.	Date	Venue	Opponent	Score	Result	Competition	Ref.
1	6 July 2013	Ahmadu Bello Stadium, Kaduna, Nigeria	Ivory Coast	4–1	4–1	2014 African Nations Championship qualification	
2	4 January 2014	Moshood Abiola National Stadium, Abuja, Nigeria	Ethiopia	1–0	2–1	Friendly	
3	15 January 2014	Cape Town Stadium, Cape Town, South Africa	Mozambique	1–1	4–2	2014 African Nations Championship	
4	19 January 2014	Cape Town Stadium, Cape Town, South Africa	South Africa	2–0	3–1	2014 African Nations Championship	

== Honours ==
Tirana

- Albanian Cup: 2016–17
