= Ansi Nika =

Albanian footballer

Personal information
- Date of birth: 22 August 1990 (age 36)
- Place of birth: Shkodër, Albania
- Height: 1.74 m (5 ft 9 in)
- Position: Right midfielder

Youth career
- Grosseto
- 2004–2007: Vllaznia Shkodër

Senior career*
Years	Team	Apps	(Gls)
2007–2009	Ada Velipojë	3	(0)
2009–2010	Vllaznia	11	(1)
2010–2015	Teuta	115	(18)
2015–2016	Kukësi	28	(1)
2016	Tirana	8	(0)
2017–2018	Laçi	45	(3)
2018–2019	Gjilani	25	(2)
2019	Flamurtari	7	(1)
- * Club domestic league appearances and goals

Ansi Nika (born 22 August 1990) is an Albanian former professional footballer who played as a midfielder.

== Club career ==
Nika begun his professional career with Ada Velipojë where he played for two seasons, before joining his boyhood club Vllaznia Shkodër at the start of 2009–10 season.

Nika signed a new one-year contract with Teuta Durrës on 19 June 2014.

A day later, he was loaned out to Kukësi for their UEFA Europa League qualification games. However, this deal later turned to be a permanent deal, as Nika remained at the club for the entire 2015–16 season.

On 5 July 2016, Nika joined Tirana on a two-year contract. He was presented three days later along with fellow midfielder Afrim Taku. He scored his first goal for the club on 26 October in the 4–1 away win against Luftëtari Gjirokastër, valid for the first leg of Albanian Cup's second round. Nika terminated his contract by mutual consent on 7 January due to lack playing of time, having collected only 338 minutes in league during the first part of the season. In an interview one day later, Nika cited that he left the club on his free will.

On 10 January 2017, Nika agreed personal terms and signed a contract until the end of the season with Albanian Superliga strugglers Laçi. With the number 14, Nika made his competitive debut with the club on 28 January by playing full-90 minutes in a 0–1 vital win over Korabi Peshkopi. He netted his maiden Laçi goal on 18 March, the winner against Flamurtari Vlorë at Laçi Stadium as the team took three vital points in their bid to escape relegation. Nika finished the season by making 15 league appearances, including 2 in cup, as Laçi avoided the relegation by just one point by winning in the last matchday against Teuta Durrës.

After initially announcing his departure from the club in the start of July, Nika returned to the club in the first days of August ahead of the new season. In the 2017–18 season, Nika continued to be a consistent starter in the midfield as he finished it with 30 league games and 2 goals. On 27 May 2018, he played in the 2018 Albanian Cup Final match versus Skënderbeu Korçë which ended in defeat. He left the club in June 2018, concluding his spell with the club by playing 51 matches between league and cup.

On 4 July 2018, Nika left Albania for the first time to sign with Football Superleague of Kosovo side Gjilani.

On 18 August 2019, Nika was announced as the newest player of Flamurtari Vlorë, returning in Albanian Superliga after one season.

== Personal life ==
His younger brother is also a footballer who currently plays for Ada Velipojë. Nika is a fan of his hometown club Vllaznia, whom he played in 2009–10 season.

== Career statistics ==
As of 19 May 2019

Club statistics
Club	Season	League			Cup		Continental		Total	
Club	Season	Division	Apps	Goals	Apps	Goals	Apps	Goals	Apps	Goals
Ada Velipojë	2007–08	Albanian First Division	?	?	?	?	—		?	?
Ada Velipojë	2008–09	Albanian First Division	3	0	1	1	—		4	1
Ada Velipojë	Total		3	0	1	1	—		4	1
Vllaznia Shkodër	2009–10	Albanian Superliga	11	1	1	0	3 (Note: All appearance(s) in UEFA Europa League)	0	15	1
Vllaznia Shkodër	2010–11	Albanian Superliga	0	0	1	0	—		1	0
Vllaznia Shkodër	Total		11	1	2	0	3	0	16	1
Teuta Durrës	2010–11	Albanian Superliga	9	0	0	0	—		9	0
Teuta Durrës	2011–12	Albanian Superliga	22	5	5	0	—		27	5
Teuta Durrës	2012–13	Albanian Superliga	24	3	5	0	2	0	31	3
Teuta Durrës	2013–14	Albanian Superliga	30	5	6	3	2	0	38	8
Teuta Durrës	2014–15	Albanian Superliga	30	5	3	1	—		33	6
Teuta Durrës	Total		115	18	19	4	4	0	138	22
Kukësi	2015–16	Albanian Superliga	28	1	6	0	—		34	1
Kukësi	Total		28	1	6	0	—		34	1
Tirana	2016–17	Albanian Superliga	8	0	2	1	—		10	1
Tirana	Total		8	0	2	1	—		10	1
Laçi	2016–17	Albanian Superliga	15	1	2	0	—		17	1
Laçi	2017–18	Albanian Superliga	30	2	4	0	—		34	2
Laçi	Total		45	3	6	0	—		51	3
Gjilani	2018–19	Football Superleague of Kosovo	25	2	0	0	—		10	1
Gjilani	Total		25	2	0	0	—		10	1
Career total			235	23	36	6	7	0	278	31

== Honours ==
Kukësi

- Albanian Cup: 2015–16
