= Flamur Bajrami =

Kosovar footballer (born 1997)

Personal information
- Date of birth: 10 February 1997 (age 29)
- Place of birth: Podujevo, FR Yugoslavia
- Height: 1.78 m (5 ft 10 in)
- Position: Midfielder

Team information
- Current team: Prishtina e Re
- Number: 22

Youth career
- 2010–2015: 2 Korriku

Senior career*
Years	Team	Apps	(Gls)
2015–2016	Vëllaznimi		
2016–2018	Tirana	3	(0)
2018–2019	Vëllaznimi	4	(0)
2019	Llapi	4	(0)
2019–2023	2 Korriku		
2023–	Prishtina e Re		
- * Club domestic league appearances and goals as of 19 May 2019

Flamur Bajrami (born 10 February 1997) is a Kosovo Albanian professional footballer who plays as a midfielder for Kosovan club Prishtina e Re.

== Club career ==
=== Early career ===
In April 2014, Bajrami played in a Pristina Under-17 Regional League Tournament and was the best scorer in Group B with two goals. In June 2015, he was at trial with the reputable Hajduk Split B, but didn't make the cut.

=== Vëllaznimi ===
On 28 December 2015, Bajrami joined First Football League of Kosovo side Vëllaznimi, on a season-long contract.

=== Tirana ===
On 26 August 2016, Bajrami joined Albanian Superliga side Tirana. On 23 October 2016, he made his debut in a 2–1 away defeat against Luftëtari Gjirokastër after coming on as a substitute at 65th minute in place of Gjergji Muzaka.

=== Return to Vëllaznimi ===
On 18 January 2018, Bajrami joined Football Superleague of Kosovo side Vëllaznimi.

=== Llapi ===
On 5 January 2019, Bajrami joined Football Superleague of Kosovo side Llapi, on a two-and-a-half-year contract.
