= Merveil Ndockyt =

Congolese footballer (born 1998)

Personal information
- Full name: Merveil Valthy Streeker Ndockyt
- Date of birth: 20 July 1998 (age 28)
- Place of birth: Brazzaville, Congo Republic
- Height: 1.69 m (5 ft 7 in)
- Position: Attacking midfielder

Team information
- Current team: AS FAR
- Number: 13

Senior career*
Years	Team	Apps	(Gls)
2014	ACNFF		
2015	CARA		
2016	Léopards	16	(5)
2016–2017	Tirana	29	(5)
2017–2018	Getafe B	12	(2)
2018–2020	Getafe	6	(0)
2018–2019	→ Mallorca (loan)	5	(0)
2019	→ Barcelona B (loan)	10	(2)
2019–2020	→ Osijek (loan)	27	(0)
2020–2022	Osijek	19	(0)
2022–2025	Gorica	75	(6)
2025–2026	Rijeka	21	(3)
2026-	AS FAR	0	(0)

International career^{‡}
2015–	Congo	29	(1)
- * Club domestic league appearances and goals as of 16 September 2026 ‡ National team caps and goals as of 20 July 2026

Merveil Valthy Streeker Ndockyt (born 20 July 1998) is a Congolese professional footballer who plays as an attacking midfielder for Moroccan club AS FAR and the Congo national team.

== Club career ==
=== Early career ===
Born in Brazzaville, Ndockyt started his career with ACNFF in 2014. He subsequently had spells at CARA Brazzaville (also playing in the CAF Confederation Cup with the side) and AC Léopards.

=== Tirana ===
On 20 August 2016, Ndockyt moved for the first time in Europe where he signed a two-year contract with Albanian Superliga outfit Tirana. Given squad number 19, he made his first appearance for the club in championship matchday 3 against Kukësi at home, netting the equalizer with a shot outside the box as the match ended in a 2–2 draw.

Ndockyt was distinguished for his performances during the first part of the season, being an important player in the lineup. In January 2017, Ndockyt refused a call-up by Congo national team in order to be part of the team in their winter training camp in Antalya, Turkey. Later in April 2017, he scored in the first leg of 2016–17 Albanian Cup semi-final tie against Besëlidhja Lezhë which ended in a 1–1 draw; Tirana eventually qualified to the final for the first time in five years after winning 2–0 in the second leg. It was Tirana's first win after 12 winless matches.

Ndockyt scored his 5th league goal of the season in the 2–0 home win over Luftëtari Gjirokastër in the penultimate matchday to keep Tirana's survival hopes alive. The club eventually relegated for the first time to First Division after not winning in the final match against Vllaznia. In the Albanian Cup final on 31 May, Ndockyt scored a penalty kick in 112 minute as Tirana defeated Skënderbeu 3–1 after extra time to win the trophy for a record 16th time. The cup success meant the return of Tirana in European competitions after 5 years.

On 21 June, he was included in new manager Zé Maria's list for the 2017–18 UEFA Europa League first qualifying round. He played full-90 minutes in both matches, making his European debut in the process, as Tirana was knocked out by Maccabi Tel Aviv 5–0 on aggregate. Ndockyt finished his Tirana career by making 38 appearances in all competitions, scoring 7 goals.

=== Getafe and loans ===
On 10 August 2017, Ndockyt moved to La Liga side Getafe CF for €400,000, making his transfer as one of the most profiting transfers in Tirana's history. The transfer was confirmed by Tirana on 28 August, with his former side retaining part ownership.

Initially assigned to the B-side in Tercera División, Ndockyt made his first team debut on 19 February 2018, replacing Amath Ndiaye in a 3–0 home win against Celta de Vigo. On 23 August, he was loaned to Segunda División side RCD Mallorca for the season.

On 29 January 2019, Ndockyt's loan was terminated and he subsequently returned to Geta. Two days later, he was loaned to FC Barcelona B in Segunda División B, until June.

=== Osijek ===
On 28 August 2019, Ndockyt joined Croatian First Football League side NK Osijek in a temporary deal.

On 27 July 2020 he became an Osijek player.

== International career ==
Ndockyt was part of the Congo national team that competed in the 2017 Africa Cup of Nations qualification.

== Career statistics ==
=== Club ===
As of 19 May 2019

Appearances and goals by club, season and competition
Club	Season	League			Cup		Europe		Total	
Club	Season	Division	Apps	Goals	Apps	Goals	Apps	Goals	Apps	Goals
Tirana	2016–17	Albanian Superliga	29	5	7	2	—		36	7
Tirana	2017–18	Albanian Superliga	0	0	0	0	2 (Note: Including all appearance(s) in UEFA Europa League)	0	2	0
Tirana	Total		29	5	7	2	2	0	38	7
Getafe B	2017–18	Tercera División	12	2	—				12	2
Getafe	2017–18	La Liga	6	0	0	0	—		6	0
Getafe	2018–19	La Liga	0	0	—		—		0	0
Getafe	Total		6	0	0	0	—		6	0
Mallorca (loan)	2018–19	Segunda División	5	0	2	0	—		7	0
Barcelona B (loan)	2018–19	Segunda División B	10	2	0	0	—		10	2
Career total			62	9	9	2	2	0	73	11

=== International ===
As of match played 14 October 2025

Appearances and goals by national team and year
National team	Year	Apps	Goals
Congo	2015	5	0
Congo	2016	4	0
Congo	2017	2	0
Congo	2018	5	1
Congo	2019	1	0
Congo	2020	3	0
Congo	2021	1	0
Congo	2022	–	
Congo	2023	–	
Congo	2024	6	0
Congo	2025	2	0
Total		29	1

Scores and results list Congo's goal tally first, score column indicates score after each Ndockyt goal.

List of international goals scored by Merveil Ndockyt
No.	Date	Venue	Opponent	Score	Result	Competition
1	11 October 2018	Stade Alphonse Massemba-Débat, Brazzaville, Congo	Liberia	1–0	3–1	2019 Africa Cup of Nations qualification

== Honours ==
Tirana

- Albanian Cup: 2016–17
