= Kukës Arena =

Football stadium in Albania

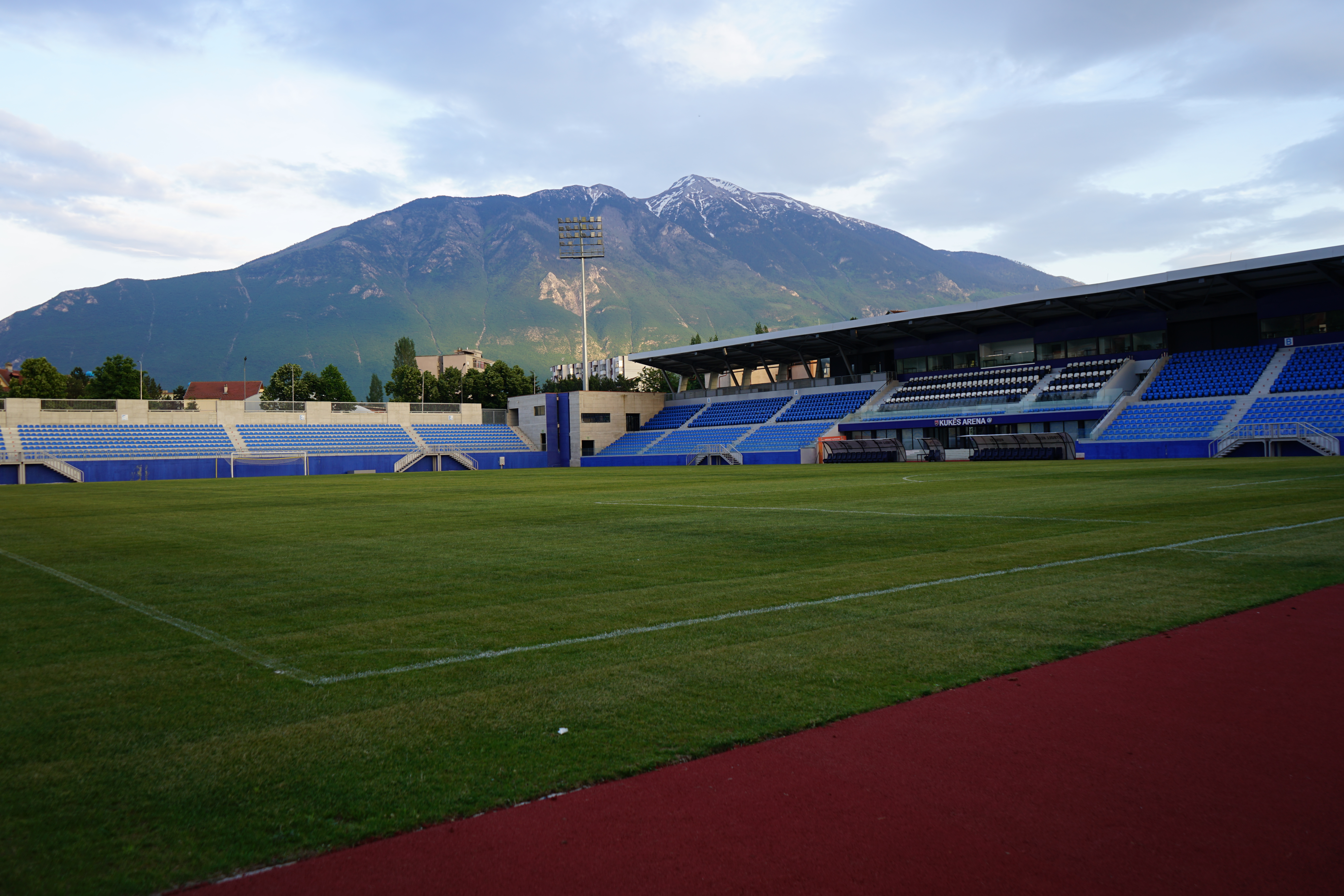
- The rebuilt stadium in 2023
- Interactive map of Kukës Arena
- Full name: Kukës Arena
- Former names: Përparimi Stadium (until 2010); Zeqir Ymeri Stadium (2010–2022)
- Address: Rruga Stadiumi, 8501
- Location: Kukës, Albania
- Coordinates: 42°04′44″N 20°25′13″E
- Owner: Municipality of Kukës
- Operator: Municipality of Kukës
- Capacity: 6,322
- Surface: Grass
- Field size: 100 by 74 metres (109 yd × 81 yd)

Construction
- Built: 2021–2022
- Opened: 23 April 2022; 4 years ago
- Cost: 80 millionë Lekë (€576,000)
- Architect: Mujo Noka
- Structural engineer: Vladimir Spahiu
- General contractor: Fatjoni Sh.P.K

Tenant
- Kukësi: 2012–present

The Kukës Arena is a stadium in Kukës, Albania. It is mainly used for football matches and is the home ground of the Kategoria Superiore club Kukësi. The stadium was built on the site of the pre-existing Përparimi Stadium, located near the center of Kukës on Rruga Stadiumi (Stadium Street).

== Incidents ==
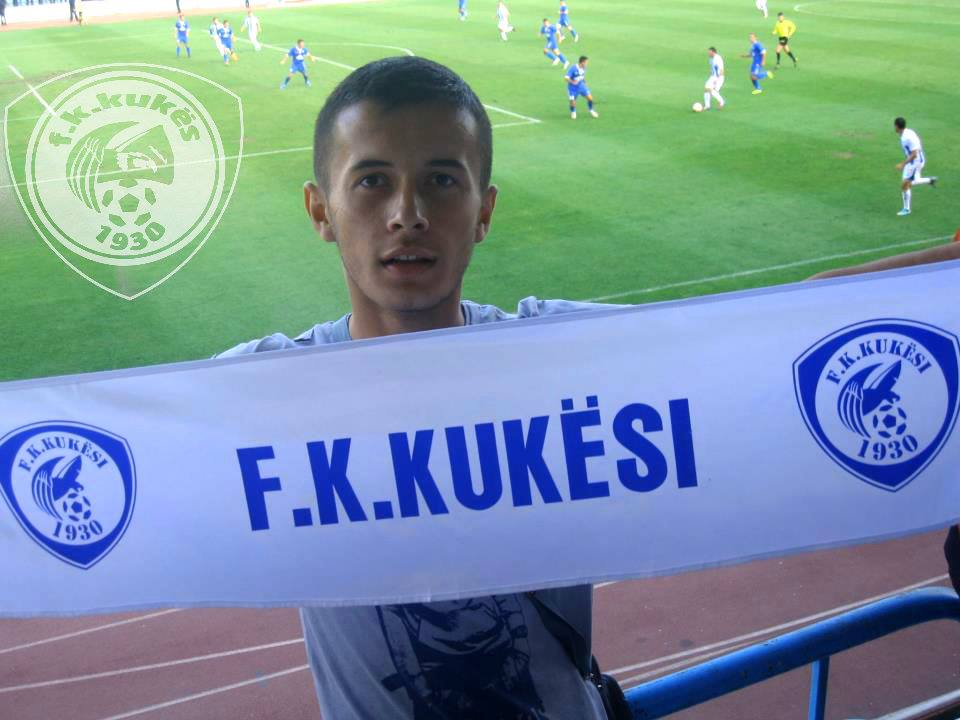
Ilirjan Thaçi (1995-2012), during a match of FK Kukësi at the old Zeqir Ymeri stadium.

During a friendly match between Kukësi U17 and Liria U17 on November 30, 2012, 17-year-old footballer Ilirjan Thaçi collapsed and died on the field after suffering a heart attack related to a previously undetected heart problem. Thaçi, born in 1995, was a defender on the books of FK Kukësi, his hometown club where he was also a lifelong supporter. He collapsed in the tenth minute of a friendly match and died of a myocardial infarction despite efforts to resuscitate him. The following weekend, a minute's silence was held before every match in Albania in memory of Thaçi, and there were also calls for the stadium to be renamed after Thaçi. In his memory, a mini-tournament was held between six youth teams from Albania and Kosovo, organized by FK Kukësi president Safet Gjici.

== Gallery ==
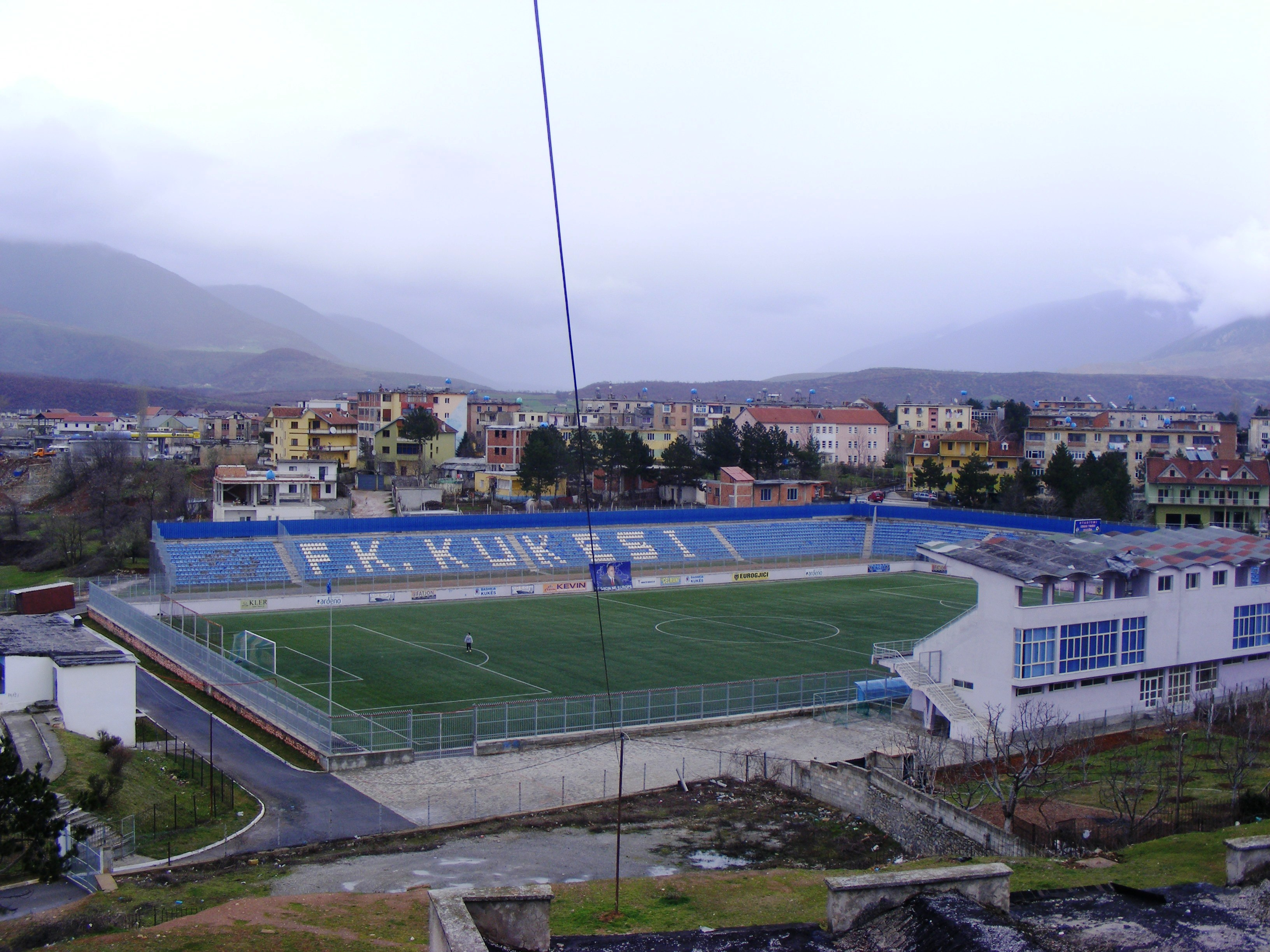
The old stadium from above (2015)

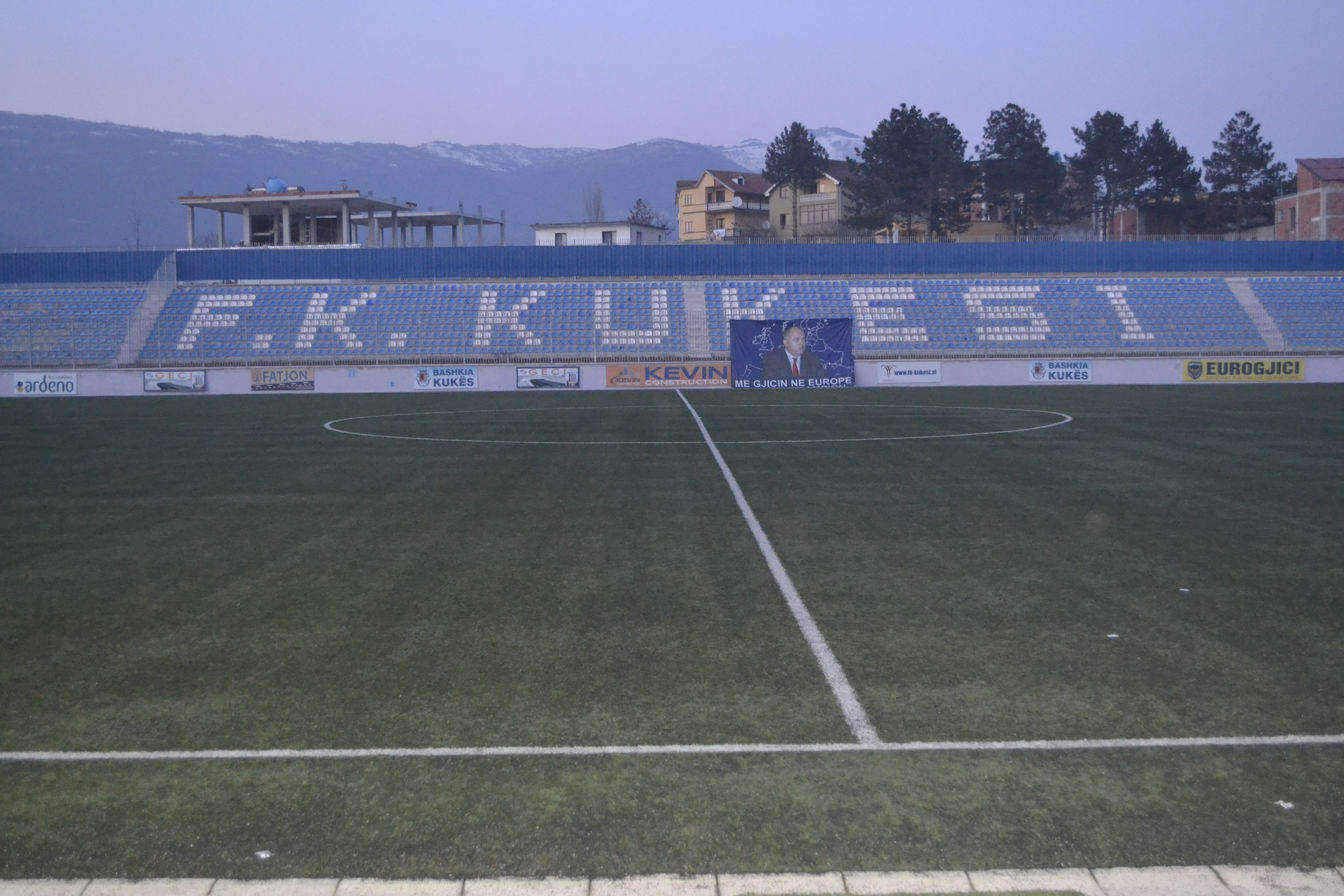
Interior overview of the old stadium (2015)
