= Moïse Nkounkou =

Congolese footballer

Personal information
- Full name: Moïse Justalain Nkounkou
- Date of birth: 2 August 1996 (age 30)
- Place of birth: Congo
- Height: 1.69 m (5 ft 7 in)
- Position: Right midfielder

Team information
- Current team: Diables Noirs

Youth career
- ACNFF

Senior career*
Years	Team	Apps	(Gls)
2013–2014	Étoile du Congo		
2014–2016	AC Léopards		
2016–2017	Tirana	32	(1)
2018–2019	Diables Noirs		
2019	Motema Pembe		
2019–2020	Hafia		
2020–2021	Étoile du Congo		
2021–2022	Otohô		
2022–2024	SC Gagnoa		
2024–	Diables Noirs		

International career
2011	Congo U17	4	(1)
2013–2018	Congo	16	(1)
- * Club domestic league appearances and goals

Moïse Nkounkou (born 2 August 1996) is a Congolese professional footballer who plays for Diables Noirs as well as the Congo national team.

== International career ==
In January 2014, coach Claude Leroy, invited him to be a part of the Congo squad for the 2014 African Nations Championship. The team was eliminated in the group stages after losing to Ghana, drawing with Libya and defeating Ethiopia.

== Career statistics ==
=== International ===
Appearances and goals by national team and year
National team	Year	Apps	Goals
Congo	2013	2	0
Congo	2014	5	1
Congo	2015	7	0
Congo	2016	–	
Congo	2017	1	0
Congo	2018	1	0
Total		16	1

Scores and results list Congo's goal tally first, score column indicates score after each Nkounkou goal.

List of international goals scored by Passang Tshering
No.	Date	Venue	Opponent	Score	Result	Competition
1	21 January 2014	Peter Mokaba Stadium, Polokwane, South Africa	Libya	1–0	2–2	2014 African Nations Championship

== Honours ==
Tirana

- Albanian Cup: 2016–17
