= Bledar Marashi =

Albanian footballer

Personal information
- Full name: Bledar Marashi
- Date of birth: 3 October 1990 (age 36)
- Place of birth: Laç, Albania
- Height: 1.79 m (5 ft 10 in)
- Position: Forward

Youth career
- Shkëndija

Senior career*
| Years | Team | Apps | (Gls) |
| 2009–2013 | Laçi | 55 | (3) |
| 2013–2014 | Adriatiku | 27 | (8) |
| 2014–2017 | Besëlidhja | 66 | (10) |
- * Club domestic league appearances and goals as of 1 January 2015

Bledar Marashi (born 3 October 1990 in Laç) is an Albanian footballer who most recently played for Besëlidhja Lezhë in the Albanian First Division.
