= Mirel Josa =

Albanian footballer and coach

Personal information
- Date of birth: 1 June 1963 (age 63)
- Place of birth: Tirana, Albania
- Height: 1.82 m (6 ft 0 in)
- Position: Midfielder

Senior career*
Years	Team	Apps	(Gls)
1980–1991	17 Nëntori	253	(40)
1991–1992	Aris	22	(0)
1992–1995	Kavala	126	(10)
1996–1997	ILTEX Lykoi	8	(0)
1997–1998	Alexandroupoli	20	(2)
1998–1999	Neapoli		
1999–2000	Poseidon Nea Michaniona	32	(0)

International career
1984–1992	Albania	27	(1)

Managerial career
- 2003–2004: Tirana
- 2005: Lushnja
- 2005–2006: Skënderbeu
- 2006: Tirana
- 2006–2008: Vllaznia
- 2008–2009: Elbasani
- 2009–2010: Teuta
- 2010: Skënderbeu
- 2010: Shkumbini
- 2010–2011: Vllaznia
- 2012–2016: Skënderbeu
- 2016–2017: Tirana
- 2017–2019: Prishtina
- 2021: Kukësi
- 2021–2022: Laçi
- 2022–2023: Vllaznia
- 2023–2024: Laçi
- 2024: Besa Kavajë
- 2025: Vëllaznimi
- 2025: Suhareka
- 2025–2026: Bylis
- 2026–: Besëlidhja
- * Club domestic league appearances and goals

Mirel Josa (born 1 June 1963) is an Albanian football coach and a former player. As a player, he played in the Greek Alpha Ethniki for Nea Kavala and Aris, as well as making 27 international appearances for the Albania national football team between 1984 and 1992.

== Playing career ==
=== Club ===
Josa started his club career with his boyhood club 17 Nëntori where he would play for ten years, winning three league titles alongside fellow internationals and Albanian legends Arbën Minga, Shkëlqim Muça and Agustin Kola. He will be long remembered by the fans for his last-minute goal against the Romanian side Dinamo București in the 1986–87 edition of European Cup Winners' Cup, which brought his team in the best 16 of the competition, where they got eliminated by Malmö.

Later, Josa left the country for the first time and moved abroad, signing a one-year contract with Greek side Aris. He played only one season with the club, then moved to AO Kavala. He ended his playing career with Greek lower league side ILTEX Lykoi, Alexandroupoli and Neapoli.

=== International ===
In his youth years Josa distinguished himself both as a defensive and attacking midfielder. During the 1982 UEFA European Under-18 Championship, played in Finland, Josa managed to score a goal against Netherlands, in a 1–3 loss, which disqualified Netherlands, where Marco van Basten was present.

During the 1984 UEFA European Under-21 Football Championship his goal made Albania draw against West Germany in Trier, and was a determining factor in qualifying Albania in the quarter-finals of the championship, eliminating West Germany, Turkey, and Austria. After that game Josa was awarded the Master of Sports title.

He made his senior debut for Albania in an October 1984 FIFA World Cup qualification match away at Belgium and earned a total of 27 caps, scoring 1 goal. In the national team during the qualifiers of Mexico 1986 campaign he scored the first goal in the famous December 1984 home win over Belgium. His final international was an April 1992 FIFA World Cup qualification match against Spain.

== Managerial career ==
=== Vllaznia ===
On 26 October 2010, Josa become the new coach of Vllaznia, replacing the Montenegrin coach Mojas Radonjić who was sacked following a run of negative results. He returned for the first time in the club since 2008. He was presented to the media in the very same day.

=== Skënderbeu ===
On 4 August 2012, Josa was unveiled as the new coach of Skënderbeu ahead of 2012–13 season.

On 18 May 2016, after winning the club's six consecutive league title and his fourth personal, Josa become the most successful coach in the history of Albanian football.

=== Tirana ===
Josa was appointed the new coach of Tirana on 2 November 2016 only a day following the sacking of Ilir Daja. It was his second return to Tirana, the first since 2006. During the presentation, club president Refik Halili stated that he sacrificed Daja for the returning of Josa. On 27 May 2017, Tirana suffered relegation for the first time in history after not going more than a goalless in the last matchday against Vllaznia in Shkodër, which saw the club finish the season in 9th place which relegated them. Four days later, Tirana won the Albanian Cup for the 16th in history, beating Skënderbeu 3–1 in the final. On 15 June, Josa left the club after terminating the contract by mutual consent.

== Personal life ==
Josa is the son-in-law of Shyqyri Rreli, former Albania coach.

== Honours ==
=== Player ===
Tirana

- Albanian National Championship (4): 1981–82, 1984–85, 1987–88, 1988–89
- Albanian Cup (3): 1982–83, 1983–84, 1985–86

=== Manager ===
Tirana

- Kategoria Superiore (1): 2003–04
- Albanian Cup (1): 2016–17

Skënderbeu

- Kategoria Superiore (4): 2012–13, 2013–14, 2014–15, 2015–16
- Albanian Supercup (2): 2013, 2014

Prishtina

- Kosovar Cup (1): 2017–18

Vllaznia

- Albanian Cup (1): 2021–22
