= 2016–17 Albanian Cup =

Kupa e Shqipërisë

Tournament details
- Country: Albania
- Teams: 36

Final positions
- Champions: Tirana
- Runners-up: Skënderbeu

Tournament statistics
- Matches played: 58
- Goals scored: 172 (2.97 per match)
- Top goal scorer(s): Bruno Aquino; Ben Azubel; Bakary Nimaga; Afrim Taku; Myrto Uzuni (4 goals each)

2016–17 Albanian Cup (Albanian: Kupa e Shqipërisë) was the sixty-fifth season of Albania's annual cup competition. Tirana won the title for the 16th time, becoming the most successful club in cup's history.

Ties are played in a two-legged format similar to those of European competitions. If the aggregate score is tied after both games, the team with the higher number of away goals advances. If the number of away goals is equal in both games, the match is decided by extra time and a penalty shoot-out, if necessary.

== Preliminary round ==
In order to reduce the number of participating teams for the first round to 32, a preliminary tournament is played. In contrast to the main tournament, the preliminary tournament is held as a single-leg knock-out competition. Matches were played on 25 September 2016 and involved the teams from Albanian Second Division.

Team 1	Score	Team 2
Butrinti (III)	4–3	Naftëtari (III)
Ada (III)	0–3	Kevitan (III)

== First round ==
All 28 teams of the 2016–17 Superliga and First Division entered in this round along with the two qualifiers from the preliminary round. The first legs were played on 28 September 2016 and the second legs took place on 5 October 2016.

Team 1	Agg.	Team 2	1st leg	2nd leg
Butrinti (III)	1–9	Skënderbeu (I)	1–1	0–8
Tomori (II)	0–4	Kukësi (I)	0–3	0–1
Sopoti (II)	1–8	Tirana (I)	1–1	0–7
Turbina (II)	0–5	Laçi (I)	0–2	0–3
Shkumbini (II)	1–7	Bylis (II)	1–3	0–4
Elbasani (II)	2–3	Luftëtari (I)	0–1	2–2
Dinamo Tirana (II)	3–2	Pogradeci (II)	2–1	1–1
Lushnja (II)	1–4	Apolonia (II)	1–3	0–1
Shënkolli (II)	0–2	Teuta (I)	0–0	0–2
Adriatiku (II)	0–7	Vllaznia (I)	0–3	0–4
Iliria (II)	1–6	Flamurtari (I)	1–0	0–6
Besa (II)	2–5	Tërbuni (II)	1–1	1–4 (a.e.t.)
Kamza (II)	3–1	Korabi (I)	1–1	2–0
Burreli (II)	4–5	Kastrioti (II)	3–1	1–4
Erzeni (II)	3–5	Besëlidhja (II)	1–3	2–2
Kevitan (III)	1–9	Partizani (I)	1–5	0–4

== Second round ==
All 16 qualified teams from First round progressed to the second round. The first legs were played on 26 October 2016 and the second legs took place on 16 November 2016.

Team 1	Agg.	Team 2	1st leg	2nd leg
Apolonia (II)	2–4	Skënderbeu (I)	2–1	0–3
Dinamo Tirana (II)	0–2	Kukësi (I)	0–2	0–0
Luftëtari (I)	1–5	Tirana (I)	1–4	0–1
Bylis (II)	1–4	Laçi (I)	1–1	0–3
Besëlidhja (II)	2–1	Partizani (I)	1–0	1–1
Kastrioti (II)	3–4	Teuta (I)	2–1	1–3
Kamza (II)	0–8	Vllaznia (I)	0–2	0–6
Tërbuni (II)	3–5	Flamurtari (I)	3–3	0–2

== Quarter-finals ==
All eight qualified teams from the second round progressed to the quarter-finals. The first legs were played on 1 February 2017 and the second legs took place on 15 February 2017.

Team 1	Agg.	Team 2	1st leg	2nd leg
Laçi (I)	1–2	Skënderbeu (I)	1–1	0–1
Tirana (I)	2–1	Kukësi (I)	2–1	0–0
Besëlidhja (II)	2–1	Flamurtari (I)	2–1	0–0
Vllaznia (I)	1–2	Teuta (I)	1–0	0–2

1 February 2017	Laçi	1–1	Skënderbeu	Laçi Stadium, Laç
15:00 CET	Kanapari 69'		Osmani 90+2'	Attendance: 750; Referee: Kridens Meta

15 February 2017	Skënderbeu	1–0	Laçi	Skënderbeu Stadium, Korçë
14:30 CET	Djair 7'; Esquerdinha 44'			Attendance: 800; Referee: Andi Koci

Skënderbeu advanced to the semi finals.

1 February 2017	Tirana	2–1	Kukësi	Selman Stërmasi Stadium, Tirana
18:00 CET	Halili 30'; Taku 45'		Emini 47'	Attendance: 500; Referee: Eldorjan Hamiti

15 February 2017	Kukësi	0–0	Tirana	Zeqir Ymeri Stadium, Kukës
14:30 CET				Attendance: 1,500; Referee: Kridens Meta

Tirana advanced to the semi finals.

1 February 2017	Flamurtari	1–2	Besëlidhja	Flamurtari Stadium, Vlorë
18:00 CET	Smajli 74' (o.g.)		Camara 19'; Marashi 47'	Attendance: 2,500; Referee: Kreshnik Cjapi

15 February 2017	Besëlidhja	0–0	Flamurtari	Brian Filipi Stadium, Lezhë
14:30 CET				Attendance: 1,031; Referee: Lorenc Jemini

Besëlidhja advanced to the semi finals.

1 February 2017	Vllaznia	1–0	Teuta	Loro Boriçi Stadium, Shkodër
15:00 CET	Tafili 23'			Attendance: 531; Referee: Lorenc Jemini

15 February 2017	Teuta	2–0	Vllaznia	Niko Dovana Stadium, Durrës
18:00 CET	Hila 81'; Progni 83'			Attendance: 1,500; Referee: Enea Jorgji

Teuta advanced to the semi finals.

== Semi-finals ==
The first legs were played on 5–6 April and the second legs were played on 19 April 2017.

Team 1	Agg.	Team 2	1st leg	2nd leg
Besëlidhja (II)	1–3	Tirana (I)	1–1	0–2
Skënderbeu (I)	2–0	Teuta (I)	1–0	1–0

5 April 2017	Besëlidhja	1–1	Tirana	Zeqir Ymeri Stadium, Kukës
16:00 CEST	Marashi 67'		Ndockyt 59'	Referee: Enea Jorgji

19 April 2017	Tirana	2–0	Besëlidhja	Selman Stërmasi Stadium, Tirana
18:00 CEST	Taku 23' (pen.); Hoxhallari 39'			Referee: Laver Alla

Tirana advanced to the final.

6 April 2017	Skënderbeu	1−0	Teuta	Skënderbeu Stadium, Korçë
19:00 CEST	Vangjeli 85'			Referee: Eldorjan Hamiti

19 April 2017	Teuta	0−1	Skënderbeu	Niko Dovana Stadium, Durrës
15:30 CEST			Latifi 51'	Referee: Juxhin Xhaja

Skënderbeu advanced to the final.

== Final ==
31 May 2017
19:00

Skënderbeu	1–3 (a.e.t.)	Tirana
Radaš 86'	Report	Edeh 20'; Nkounkou 102'; Ndockyt 112' (pen.)

Elbasan Arena, Elbasan
Attendance: 1,500
Referee: Kridens Meta
