= 2012–13 KF Tirana season =

Tirana
2012–13 season
- Chairman: Lulzim Basha
- Manager: Nevil Dede
- Ground: Selman Stërmasi Stadium
- Kategoria Superiore: 5th
- Albanian Supercup: Winners
- Albanian Cup: Second round
- Europa League: Second qualifying round
- Top goalscorer: Mirel Cota (5)
Home colours	Away colours

The 2012–13 season was Klubi i Futbollit Tirana's 74th competitive season, 74th consecutive season in the Kategoria Superiore and 92nd year in existence as a football club. Following the title win four seasons ago, KF Tirana added to their 23 titles to make it their record 24th title win. KF Tirana played UEFA Europa League against CS Grevenmacher and Aalesunds FK.

== 2012 ==
The club could get organized better for the current season, starting from Europa League participation. Even though having a healthy budget, club officials were too late to bring quality players on time, adding here the fact that they let go of main attacker, Bekim Balaj for a low transfer sum to AC Sparta Prague although Balaj still had six months of his contract left. And lost few other players, however, they have the merit to keep team's core and also bringing some new arrivals, all for sake of achieving the title after three years drought. Tirana managed to pass only one round in Europa League, eliminating CS Grevenmacher of Luxembourg, before being knocked out from Norwegians of Aalesunds FK in the 2nd round. Tirana won again the Supercup (their jubilee 10th trophy), by beating on their 3rd final clash KF Skënderbeu Korçë. Despite due to extend his link with Tirana for the following two seasons and continuing the project, the successful Spanish coach, Rubio, did not sign that contract officially, due to some clauses on which himself and the club did not agree and eventually him and the club departed ways after over 13 months cooperation. Artur Lekbello was appointed Tirana new coach, but despite his credits as a player in the past, he did not prove that successful as a coach and therefore presented his resignation to club administrator after only 42 days, following unpleasant results in Tirana's bench. Alban Tafaj once again took the vacant place as a temporary coach. The end of the year 2012 found KF Tirana in the 3rd spot of 2012-13 Kategoria Superiore, 11 points adrift leaders KF Skënderbeu Korçë. Tirana were also eliminated early in the Cup. After passed KF Partizani at the first round winning both matches, 2-1 and 1-0 they were eliminated at second round from debut team, FK Kukësi losing first leg 0-4 and winning second one 3-2.

== Background ==
=== Kit ===
- Supplier: Errea
- Sponsor: Municipality of Tirana, American Hospital, Lajthiza Water, Belle Air, Tirana Brewing House, Tirana Dekor,

=== Other information ===
President	Lulzim Basha
Ground (capacity and dimensions)	Selman Stërmasi stadium (12, 500 / 105m x 68m)

Source: Selman Stërmasi stadium

== Coaching staff ==
As of November 2012

Position	Name
Head coach	Nevil Dede
Assistant coach	Sokol Bulku
Goalkeeping coach	Astrit Nallbani
Technical Director	Alban Tafaj
Club Secretary	Iva Mera
Athletic Coach	Adrian Bekteshi
Physical Therapy	Arzen Voci
OPS	Arba Morina
Reporter	Lorin Burba

== Players ==
=== 2012–13 squad ===
Note: Flags indicate national team as defined under FIFA eligibility rules; some limited exceptions apply. Players may hold more than one non-FIFA nationality.

No.	Pos.	Nation	Player
1	GK	ALB	Ilion Lika (captain)
2	DF	ALB	Elvis Sina
3	DF	ALB	Erjon Dushku
4	MF	ALB	Gentian Muça
5	DF	ALB	Entonio Pashaj
6	DF	ALB	Renaldo Kalari
7	DF	ALB	Arjan Pisha
8	MF	ALB	Elton Muçollari
9	MF	ALB	Afrim Taku
10	MF	KOS	Mensur Limani
11	MF	ALB	Gilman Lika
12	MF	ALB	Julian Ahmataj

No.	Pos.	Nation	Player
13	MF	ALB	Erando Karabeci
14	FW	ALB	Mario Morina
16	FW	ALB	Mirel Cota
17	MF	ALB	Klodian Duro
18	MF	ALB	Nertil Ferraj
19	MF	ALB	Ardit Peposhi
20	MF	ALB	Gerald Tusha
21	FW	ALB	Arber Abilaliaj
24	MF	ALB	Gerald Tusha
25	GK	ALB	Xhino Sejdo
27	MF	ALB	Fabio Hoxha
30	MF	ITA	Francesco Pigoni

=== Foreign players ===
- (Italy) Francesco Pigoni
- (Kosovo) Mensur Limani

== Competitions ==
=== Albanian Supercup ===
19 August 2012 Final	Tirana	2–1	Skënderbeu Korçë	Tirana
20:00 CET	Taku 40' (yellow card) 89'; G. Lika (yellow card) 46' (yellow-red card) 90'; Dushku (yellow card) 65' (yellow-red card) 84'; Radaš 90' (o.g.)	Report	Kuli (yellow card) 42'; Arapi (yellow card) 46'; Plaku 51'; Lilaj (yellow card) 62'	Stadium: Qemal Stafa Stadium; Attendance: 4,000; Referee: Enea Jorgji

=== Kategoria Superiore ===
==== League table ====
Pos	Team	Pld	W	D	L	GF	GA	GD	Pts	Qualification or relegation
3	Teuta	26	14	6	6	32	24	+8	48	Qualification for the Europa League first qualifying round
4	Flamurtari	26	13	7	6	49	33	+16	46	
5	Tirana	26	12	7	7	30	23	+7	43	
6	Vllaznia	26	11	5	10	30	26	+4	38	
7	Laçi	26	11	5	10	32	31	+1	38	Qualification for the Europa League first qualifying round (Note: Laçi qualified for the Europa League first qualifying round by winning the 2012–13 Albanian Cup.)

Source: Albanian Football Association (in Albanian), Soccerway
Rules for classification: 1) points; 2) points in head-to-head matches; 3) goal difference in head-to-head matches; 4) goals scored in head-to-head matches; 5) total goal difference; 6) total goals scored; 7) draw

==== Results summary ====
Overall								Home						Away					
Pld	W	D	L	GF	GA	GD	Pts	W	D	L	GF	GA	GD	W	D	L	GF	GA	GD
26	12	7	7	30	23	+7	43	8	3	2	20	13	+7	4	4	5	10	10	0

Last updated: 10 May 2013.
Source: Competitive matches

==== Results by round ====
Round	1	2	3	4	5	6	7	8	9	10	11	12	13	14	15	16	17	18	19	20	21	22	23	24	25	26
Ground	A	H	A	A	H	A	H	A	H	A	H	H	H	H	A	H	H	A	H	A	H	A	H	A	H	A
Result	W	W	D	W	D	D	D	L	L	W	W	L	W	W	L	D	W	L	L	W	W	L	W	D	W	D
Position	2	2	2	2	2	2	3	4	7	5	3	5	3	3	4	5	4	6	6	5	5	6	5	5	5	5

Source: Competitive matches
A = Away; H = Home; W = Win; D = Draw; L = Loss

==== Matches ====
25 August 2012 1	Tomori Berat	0–1	Tirana	Berat
17:00 CET	Kule (yellow card) 28'; Stafa (yellow card) 29'; Frashëri (yellow card) 29'; Hysko (yellow card) 42'	Report	Duro 30' (pen.) (yellow card) 42'; Kalari (yellow card) 74'; Karabeci (yellow card) 90'	Stadium: Tomori Stadium; Attendance: 4,000; Referee: Emirjon Sino

2 September 2012 2	Tirana	3–0	Shkumbini Peqin	Tirana
17:00 CET	Morina 25', 90'; Dushku (yellow card) 40'; Pisha (yellow card) 62'; Çota 89'	Report	Gjata (yellow card) 18'; Mustafaj (yellow card) 62'	Stadium: Selman Stërmasi Stadium; Attendance: 1,500; Referee: Ditmar Jubica

14 September 2012 3	Teuta Durrës	1–1	Tirana	Durrës
19:00 CET	Deliallisi 6'; Tairi (yellow card) 90+2'	Report	Sina (yellow card) 45+1'; Dushku (yellow card) 58'; Ahmataj 65'	Stadium: Niko Dovana Stadium; Attendance: 1,200; Referee: Lorenc Jemini

22 September 2012 4	Luftëtari Gjirokastër	0–1	Tirana	Gjirokastër
14:00 CET	Shameti (yellow card) 45'	Report	Çota 13'; Ahmataj (yellow card) 52'	Stadium: Gjirokastra Stadium; Referee: Emirjon Sino

29 September 2012 5	Tirana	1–1	Besa Kavajë	Tirana
17:00 CET	Muçollari (yellow card) 43'; Pisha 63'; Ahmataj (yellow card) 88'	Report	Berisha (yellow card) 10'; Abraham (yellow card) 36' (yellow-red card) 36'; Sefa 39' (yellow card) 43'	Stadium: Qemal Stafa Stadium; Attendance: 800; Referee: Enea Jorgji

6 October 2012 6	Flamurtari Vlorë	1–1	Tirana	Vlorë
17:00 CET	Kuqi (yellow card) 50'; Bratić 56'; Mici (yellow card) 57'; Telushi (yellow card) 74'	Report	Pisha (yellow card) 18'; Morina 45'; Ahmataj (yellow card) 55'; Pashaj (yellow card) 89'	Stadium: Flamurtari Stadium; Attendance: 2,500; Referee: Laver Alla

21 October 2012 7	Tirana	0–0	Kastrioti Krujë	Tirana
14:00 CET		Report	Karapici (yellow card) 15'; Caca (yellow card) 30'; Sykaj (yellow card) 56'; Fataki (yellow card) 71'	Stadium: Qemal Stafa Stadium; Attendance: 700; Referee: Enea Jorgji

27 October 2012 8	Skënderbeu Korçë	2–0	Tirana	Korçë
17:00 CET	Orelesi (yellow card) 21'; Pejić 50', 77'	Report	Morina (yellow card) 11'; Muçollari (yellow card) 28' (yellow-red card) 55'; Dushku (yellow card) 59'; Ahmataj (yellow card) 67'	Stadium: Skënderbeu Stadium; Attendance: 6,000; Referee: Emirjon Sino

4 November 2012 9	Tirana	1–2	Kukësi	Tirana
14:00 CET	Karabeci (yellow card) 18'; Pashaj (yellow card) 18'; G. Lika 63'; Ahmataj (red card) 80'	Report	Allmuça 18' (pen.); Malindi (yellow card) 37'; Malota (yellow card) 73'; Y. Hoxha 74' (yellow card) 78'; Biskup (yellow card) 80'; Musolli (red card) 80'; Brahja (yellow card) 90'	Stadium: Qemal Stafa Stadium; Attendance: 3,500; Referee: Enea Jorgji

10 November 2012 10	Vllaznia Shkodër	0–1	Tirana	Shkodër
17:00 CET	Nallbani (yellow card) 45'; Begaj (yellow card) 79'; Beqiri (yellow card) 79'	Report	Taku (yellow card) 63'; Duro 81' (pen.); Çota (yellow card) 90+1'	Stadium: Loro Boriçi Stadium; Attendance: 3,000; Referee: Remzi Sadiku

18 November 2012 11	Tirana	2–0	Apolonia Fier	Tirana
14:00 CET	G. Lika 64'; Çota 78'	Report		Stadium: Qemal Stafa Stadium; Attendance: 300; Referee: Laver Alla

24 November 2012 12	Bylis Ballsh	1–0	Tirana	Ballsh
14:00 CET	Bakiu 57'; Teqja (yellow card) 90+2'	Report	Ahmataj (yellow card) 87'	Stadium: Adush Muça Stadium; Attendance: 2,000; Referee: Sokol Çekaj

2 December 2012 13	Tirana	2–1	Laçi	Tirana
14:00 CET	Dushku (yellow card) 50'; Duro 63' (yellow card) 69'; G. Lika 75'	Report	Hoti (yellow card) 23'; Nimani 42'; Milenković (yellow card) 86'	Stadium: Qemal Stafa Stadium; Attendance: 1,000; Referee: Laver Alla

10 February 2013 14	Tirana	1–0	Tomori Berat	Tirana
14:00 CET	Ahmataj (yellow card) 21'; Limani 37'	Report	Llani (yellow card) 44'; Arbri (yellow card) 55'; Rexha (yellow card) 63' (yellow-red card) 86'; Sunday (yellow card) 84'	Stadium: Qemal Stafa Stadium; Attendance: 1,000; Referee: Ditmar Jubica

17 February 2013 15	Shkumbini Peqin	1–0	Tirana	Peqin
14:00 CET	Mustafaj 53' (pen.); Ramazani (yellow card) 66'; Xhyra (red card) 70'; Mile (yellow card) 83'	Report	Muçollari (yellow card) 84'	Stadium: Shkumbini Stadium; Attendance: 2,500; Referee: Emirjon Sino

23 February 2013 16	Tirana	1–1	Teuta Durrës	Tirana
17:00 CET	Muça (yellow card) 53'; Dushku (yellow card) 60'; Abilaliaj 70'	Report	Tairi (yellow card) 31'; Nika (yellow card) 44'; Sheta (yellow card) 50'; Hyshmeri 62'; Buiú (yellow card) 74'; Veliaj (yellow card) 76'; Muriqi (yellow card) 90+3'	Stadium: Qemal Stafa Stadium; Attendance: 3,500; Referee: Lorenc Jemini

2 March 2013 17	Tirana	2–1	Luftëtari Gjirokastër	Tirana
17:00 CET	Morina 7', 84' (yellow card) 84'; Dushku (yellow card) 16'; Pashaj (yellow card) 25'; Muça (yellow card) 65'; Ahmataj (yellow card) 90+3'	Report	Nora (yellow card) 10'; R. Hoxha 79'	Stadium: Qemal Stafa Stadium; Attendance: 1,200; Referee: Laver Alla

10 March 2013 18	Besa Kavajë	2–1	Tirana	Kavajë
14:00 CET	Mustafa (yellow card) 2'; Cikalleshi 28' (pen.) (yellow card) 28'; Kaja (yellow card) 54'; Eminhaziri (yellow card) 72'; Batha 90+1' (yellow card) 90+3' (yellow-red card) 90+4'	Report	Ahmataj (yellow card) 11'; Pisha (yellow card) 27'; Muça (yellow card) 66'; Abilaliaj (yellow card) 86'; G. Lika 90'	Stadium: Besa Stadium; Attendance: 4,000; Referee: Edvin Hoxha

16 March 2013 19	Tirana	3–6	Flamurtari Vlorë	Tirana
14:00 CET	Morina 13' (yellow card) 37'; Taku 36'; G. Lika 42'; Pashaj (yellow card) 45+3'; Hysenbelliu (yellow card) 48'; Sejdo (red card) 90+3'	Report	Muzaka 22', 68'; Lena (yellow card) 30' (goal) 81'; Pepa 51', 70'; Memelli 90+3' (pen.)	Stadium: Selman Stërmasi Stadium; Attendance: 1,200; Referee: Bardhyl Pashaj

31 March 2013 20	Kastrioti Krujë	0–3	Tirana	Krujë
14:00 CET		Report	Abilaliaj 61'; G. Lika 71'; Pashaj (yellow card) 72'; Çota 81'	Stadium: Kastrioti Stadium; Attendance: 1,000; Referee: Bardhyl Pashaj

7 April 2013 21	Tirana	1–0	Skënderbeu Korçë	Tirana
17:00 CET	Hysenbelliu (yellow card) 21'; Pigoni (yellow card) 38'; Pema (yellow card) 50'; G. Lika 65'; Sina (yellow card) 86'	Report	Pejić (yellow card) 56'; Ademir (yellow card) 80'; Nimaga (yellow card) 82'	Stadium: Qemal Stafa Stadium; Attendance: 2,500; Referee: Enea Jorgji

13 April 2013 22	Kukësi	2–1	Tirana	Kukës
14:00 CET	Brahja 86'; Popović 90+1'; Hallaçi (yellow card) 90+2'	Report	Taku (yellow card) 29'; Pashaj (yellow card) 69'; Hoxhallari (yellow card) 71'; Çota 88'; Limani (yellow card) 90+4'	Stadium: Zeqir Ymeri Stadium; Attendance: 2,000; Referee: Enea Jorgji

20 April 2013 23	Tirana	1–0	Vllaznia Shkodër	Tirana
17:00 CET	G. Lika 47' (pen.); Abilaliaj (yellow card) 62'; Muça (yellow card) 80'; Pigoni (yellow card) 86'	Report	Marku (yellow card) 47'; Belisha (yellow card) 55'; Dema (yellow card) 66'	Stadium: Qemal Stafa Stadium; Attendance: 400; Referee: Emirjon Sino

27 April 2013 24	Apolonia Fier	0–0	Tirana	Fier
16:00 CET		Report	Muça (yellow card) 23'	Stadium: Loni Papuçiu Stadium; Attendance: 200; Referee: Ditmar Jubica

4 May 2013 25	Tirana	2–1	Bylis Ballsh	Tirana
17:00 CET	G. Lika 11'; Hysenbelliu (yellow card) 42'; Ahmataj (red card) 45'; Taku (yellow card) 74'; Limani 78'	Report	Arifaj (yellow card) 29'; Olayinka (yellow card) 37'; Sefa 39'	Stadium: Selman Stërmasi Stadium; Attendance: 1,000; Referee: Remzi Sadiku

10 May 2013 26	Laçi	0–0	Tirana	Laç
17:00 CET	Ndreka (yellow card) 14'; Shazivari (yellow card) 38'	Report	Limani (yellow card) 74'; Peposhi (yellow card) 86'	Stadium: Laçi Stadium; Referee: Laver Alla

=== Albanian Cup ===
==== First round ====
26 September 2012 First leg	Partizani Tirana	1–2	Tirana	Tirana
19:00 CET	Thana 13' (yellow card) 80'; Sulçe (yellow card) 37'; Duqi (yellow card) 82'	Report	Morina 8'; Pisha (yellow card) 21'; Taku (yellow card) 34'; Pashaj (yellow card) 42'; G. Lika 43'; Karabeci (yellow card) 88'	Stadium: Qemal Stafa Stadium; Attendance: 6,500; Referee: Lorenc Jemini

3 October 2012 Second leg	Tirana	1–0 (3–1 agg.)	Partizani Tirana	Tirana
14:30 CET	Çota 8'; Karabeci (yellow card) 84'	Report	Thana (yellow card) 45'	Stadium: Selman Stërmasi Stadium; Attendance: 2,000; Referee: Olsi Sokoli

==== Second round ====
24 October 2012 First leg	Kukësi	4–0	Tirana	Kukës
14:00 CET	Popović 27', 61'; Malota (yellow card) 37'; Biskup (yellow card) 71'; Allmuça 86', 89'; Musolli (yellow card) 90+1'	Report	Pashaj (yellow card) 33'; Karabeci (yellow card) 90'; Dushku (yellow card) 90+1'	Stadium: Zeqir Ymeri Stadium; Attendance: 2,000; Referee: Laver Alla

7 November 2012 Second leg	Tirana	3–2 (3–6 agg.)	Kukësi	Tirana
13:30 CET	Çota (yellow card) 8' (goal) 62'; Sina (yellow card) 10'; Dushku (red card) 45'; Taku (yellow card) 52'; Morina (yellow card) 57' (goal) 64'; Ferraj (yellow card) 65'; G. Lika 85'	Report	Progni 3'; Allmuça 28'; Brahja (red card) 45'; Biskup (yellow card) 80'; Musolli (yellow card) 87'	Stadium: Qemal Stafa Stadium; Attendance: 200; Referee: Elvis Peza

=== UEFA Europa League ===
==== First qualifying round ====
5 July 2012 First leg	Tirana (Albania)	2–0	(Luxembourg) Grevenmacher	Tirana, Albania
19:00 CET	Muçollari 40'; Ferraj 45+2'; Tusha (yellow card) 89'	Report		Stadium: Qemal Stafa Stadium; Attendance: 3,000; Referee: Vitaly Sevostyanik (Belarus)

10 July 2012 Second leg	Grevenmacher (Luxembourg)	0–0 (0–2 agg.)	(Albania) Tirana	Dudelange, Luxembourg
17:45 CET	Battaglia (yellow card) 44'; Braun (yellow card) 68'; Almeida (yellow card) 74'	Report	Ahmataj (yellow card) 39'; Pisha (yellow card) 51' (yellow-red card) 89'	Stadium: Stade Jos Nosbaum; Attendance: 546; Referee: Domagoj Vučkov (Croatia)

==== Second qualifying round ====
19 July 2012 First leg	Tirana (Albania)	1–1	(Norway) Aalesund	Tirana, Albania
19:00 CET	Muçollari (yellow card) 15'; Çota 38'; Sina (yellow card) 67'	Report	Stewart 57'	Stadium: Qemal Stafa Stadium; Attendance: 2,300; Referee: Aleksei Kulbakov (Belarus)

26 July 2012 Second leg	Aalesund (Norway)	5–0 (6–1 agg.)	(Albania) Tirana	Ålesund, Norway
19:00 CET	Barrantes 45+1'; Tollås 48'; James 64', 77'; Stewart 83'	Report	Ferraj (yellow card) 12'; Pashaj (yellow card) 54'; G. Lika (yellow card) 55'	Stadium: Color Line Stadion; Attendance: 4,225; Referee: Arnold Hunter (Northern Ireland)
