= 2015–16 KF Skënderbeu Korçë season =

Skënderbeu Korçë
2015–16 season
- President: Ardian Takaj
- Head coach: Mirel Josa
- Stadium: Skënderbeu Stadium
- Kategoria Superiore: Winners
- Albanian Cup: Semi-finals
- Champions League: Play-off
- Europa League: Group stage
- Albanian Supercup: Runners-up
- Top goalscorer: League: Hamdi Salihi (27); All: Hamdi Salihi (35)
Home colours	Away colours	Third colours

The 2015–16 season was Skënderbeu Korçë's sixth season competing in the Kategoria Superiore, having won five consecutive titles in the last five years. It covered a period from 1 July 2015 to 30 June 2016.

The 2015–16 season was one of the greatest campaigns in the history of Skënderbeu Korçë. The club retained the championship for the fifth consecutive season and become the first Albanian club to reach group stage of an UEFA club competition.

== Season overview ==
By eliminating Milsami Orhei in the third qualifying round of 2015–16 UEFA Champions League, Skenderbeu become first Albanian club to reach Champions League play-off.

== Players ==
As of 26 November 2015

Note: Flags indicate national team as defined under FIFA eligibility rules; some limited exceptions apply. Players may hold more than one non-FIFA nationality.

No.	Pos.	Nation	Player
1	GK	ALB	Orges Shehi (vice-captain)
3	DF	ALB	Renato Arapi
4	DF	ALB	Bruno Lulaj
5	DF	KOS	Bajram Jashanica
6	MF	ALB	Bekim Dema
7	MF	ALB	Gerhard Progni
8	MF	MLI	Bakary Nimaga
10	MF	ALB	Bledi Shkëmbi (captain)
11	MF	KOS	Leonit Abazi
12	GK	ALB	Erjon Llapanji
14	FW	ALB	Hamdi Salihi
17	FW	BUL	Ventsislav Hristov
19	DF	ALB	Tefik Osmani

No.	Pos.	Nation	Player
20	DF	BRA	Ademir
21	FW	ALB	Arbër Abilaliaj
23	MF	KOS	Bernard Berisha
25	MF	KOS	Bujar Shabani
27	MF	ALB	Liridon Latifi
30	MF	BRA	Esquerdinha
32	DF	ALB	Kristi Vangjeli
33	DF	CRO	Marko Radaš
87	MF	BRA	Djair
88	MF	ALB	Sabjen Lilaj
93	GK	POL	Jacek Deniz Troshupa
99	FW	NGR	Peter Olayinka

- Italics players who left the team during the season.
- Bold players who came in the team during the season.

== Transfers ==
=== In ===
Date	Pos.	Player	Age	Moving from	Fee	Notes
13 June 2015	MF	(Albania) Bekim Dema	22	(Albania) Vllaznia Shkodër	Free	
13 June 2015	FW	(Brazil) Mateus Lima	22	(Brazil) Operário Ferroviário	Free	
17 June 2015	MF	(Brazil) Rômulo	23	(Brazil) Paulista FC	Free	
1 June 2015	FW	(Albania) Arbër Abilaliaj	28	(Albania) Flamurtari Vlorë	Free	

=== Out ===
Date	Pos.	Player	Age	Moving to	Fee	Notes
1 June 2015	FW	(North Macedonia) Aco Stojkov	32	(North Macedonia) FK Vardar	Free	
1 June 2015	FW	(Brazil) Dhiego Martins	26	Free agent	Free	

== Pre-season and friendlies ==
16 June 2015 Friendly	Skënderbeu Korçë (Albania)	2–1	(Romania) FC Botoșani	Flachau, Austria
16:00 CET	Mateus Lima 29'; Patache 39' (o.g.)		Batin 45'

20 June 2015 Friendly	Spartak Trnava (Slovakia)	1–0	(Albania) Skënderbeu Korçë	Flachau, Austria
16:00 CET	Sabo 74'

24 June 2015 Friendly	Universitatea Craiova (Romania)	4–1	(Albania) Skënderbeu Korçë	Flachau, Austria
17:00 CET	Herghelegiu 12'; Curelea 68', 85'; 71' Băluță		Abilaliaj 41'

27 June 2015 Friendly	LASK Linz (Austria)	1–0	(Albania) Skënderbeu Korçë	Flachau, Austria
16:00 CET	Dovedan 64'

30 June 2015 Friendly	Shakhtar Donetsk (Ukraine)	2–0	(Albania) Skënderbeu Korçë	Going am Wilden Kaiser, Austria
18:00 CET	Marlos 37', 46'	Report		Stadium: Stadion Wilder Kaiser; Referee: Mirko Ostojic

1 July 2015 Friendly	MSV Duisburg (Germany)	1–0	(Albania) Skënderbeu Korçë	St. Johann in Tirol, Austria
18:00 CET	Dausch 4'	Report

6 July 2015 Friendly	Dynamo Kyiv (Ukraine)	3–0	(Albania) Skënderbeu Korçë	Jenbach, Austria
18:30 CET	Sydorchuk 48'; Buyalskyi 70'; Kravets 88'	report		Attendance: 150

== Competitions ==
=== Albanian Supercup ===
12 August 2015 Final	Skënderbeu Korçë	2–2 (a.e.t.) (7–8 p)	Laçi	Tirana, Albania
20:00 CET	Dema (yellow card) 10'; Salihi 65', 75'; Arapi (yellow card) 87'	Report	Adeniyi 11' (pen.), 51'; Sefgjinaj (yellow card) 16'; Buljan (yellow card) 95'; Bardhi (yellow card) 97'	Stadium: Qemal Stafa Stadium; Attendance: 500; Referee: Andi Koçi
	Penalties
	Shkëmbi (penalty scored); Salihi (penalty scored); Berisha (penalty scored); Lilaj (penalty scored); Hristov (penalty scored); Progni (penalty scored); Lulaj (penalty missed)		Buljan (penalty scored); Sefgjinaj (penalty scored); Veliaj (penalty scored); Çela (penalty scored); Mustafa (penalty scored); Nimani (penalty scored); Gocaj (penalty scored); Bardhi (penalty scored)

=== Kategoria Superiore ===
==== League table ====
Pos	Team	Pld	W	D	L	GF	GA	GD	Pts	Qualification or relegation
1	Skënderbeu (Note: Skënderbeu would have qualified for the Champions League second qualifying round, but were excluded from participating in the 2016–17 European competitions by UEFA for match-fixing.) (C)	36	25	4	7	73	27	+46	79	
2	Partizani	36	21	11	4	51	21	+30	74	Qualification for the Champions League second qualifying round
3	Kukësi	36	18	9	9	41	25	+16	63 (Note: Kukësi ahead of Teuta on head-to-head record; Kukësi–Teuta 3–0, Teuta–Kukësi 1–0, Kukësi–Teuta 2–2, Teuta–Kukësi 0–0.)	Qualification for the Europa League first qualifying round (Note: Kukësi qualified for the Europa League first qualifying round by winning the 2015–16 Albanian Cup.)
4	Teuta	36	18	9	9	43	28	+15	63	Qualification for the Europa League first qualifying round
5	Tirana	36	13	14	9	37	25	+12	53	

Source: Albanian Football Association (in Albanian), Soccerway
Rules for classification: 1) Points; 2) Head-to-head points; 3) Head-to-head goal difference; 4) Head-to-head goals scored; 5) Goal difference; 6) Goals scored; 7) Draw.
(C) Champions

==== Results summary ====
Overall								Home						Away					
Pld	W	D	L	GF	GA	GD	Pts	W	D	L	GF	GA	GD	W	D	L	GF	GA	GD
36	25	4	7	73	27	+46	79	15	1	2	46	12	+34	10	3	5	27	15	+12

Last updated: 18 May 2016.
Source: Competitive matches

==== Results by round ====
Round	1	2	3	4	5	6	7	8	9	10	11	12	13	14	15	16	17	18	19	20	21	22	23	24	25	26	27	28	29	30	31	32	33	34	35	36
Ground	A	H	A	H	A	A	H	A	H	H	A	H	A	H	H	A	H	A	A	H	A	H	A	A	H	A	H	H	A	H	A	H	H	A	H	A
Result	W	W	W	W	W	W	D	L	W	W	L	W	W	W	W	W	W	L	L	W	W	W	D	W	W	D	W	W	L	L	W	W	W	D	L	W
Position	3	2	1	1	1	1	1	2	2	2	2	2	2	2	2	1	1	1	2	1	1	1	1	1	1	1	1	1	1	1	1	1	1	1	1	1

Source: Competitive matches
A = Away; H = Home; W = Win; D = Draw; L = Loss

==== Matches ====
9 September 2015 1	Vllaznia Shkodër	0–1	Skënderbeu Korçë	Pukë
14:00 CET	Arbëri (yellow card) 13'; Haxhaj (yellow card) 23'; Krymi (yellow card) 37'; Shtubina (yellow card) 88'	Report	Arapi 15'; Nimaga (yellow card) 46'; Olayinka (yellow card) 77'	Stadium: Ismail Xhemali Stadium; Attendance: 100; Referee: Adrian Beqiri
Note: Postponed due to Skënderbeu's UEFA Champions League campaign; originally scheduled for 25 August 2015. The match was held at Ismail Xhemali Stadium due to reconstruction of Loro Boriçi Stadium.

29 August 2015 2	Skënderbeu Korçë	1–0	Kukësi	Korçë
20:00 CET	Jashanica (yellow card) 37'; Hristov 55'; Vangjeli (yellow card) 57'; Latifi (yellow card) 78'	Report	Felipe Moreira (yellow card) 47'; Mici (yellow card) 65'	Stadium: Skënderbeu Stadium; Attendance: 1,540; Referee: Emirjon Sino

12 September 2015 3	Tërbuni Pukë	0–2	Skënderbeu Korçë	Pukë
13:00 CET		Report	Abazi (yellow card) 37'; Arapi (yellow card) 42'; Olayinka 48', 86'; Berisha (yellow card) 67'	Stadium: Ismail Xhemali Stadium; Attendance: 1,000; Referee: Edvaldo Dyrmishi

21 September 2015 4	Skënderbeu Korçë	2–1	Tirana	Korçë
20:00 CET	Berisha 25' (yellow card) 90+3'; Olayinka (yellow card) 75'; Progni 85'	Report	Fukui 3'; Gërçaliu (yellow card) 12'; Bakaj (yellow card) 24'; Smajli (yellow card) 43'; Karabeci (yellow card) 90'	Stadium: Skënderbeu Stadium; Attendance: 3,700; Referee: Andi Koçi

26 September 2015 5	Bylis Ballsh	1–4	Skënderbeu Korçë	Ballsh
16:00 CET	Pepa (yellow card) 27'; Gava (yellow card) 42'; Ronaille 81'	Report	Olayinka 3'; Radas (yellow card) 44'; Lilaj 53'; Salihi 65'; Arapi (yellow card) 85'	Stadium: Adush Muça Stadium; Attendance: 1,000; Referee: Enea Jorgji

5 October 2015 6	Laçi	0–3	Skënderbeu Korçë	Laç
14:00 CET	Sheta (red card) 19'; Doku (yellow card) 39'; Meto (yellow card) 80'	Report	Salihi 20' (pen.), 84'; Lilaj 47'; Shehi (red card) 61'; Vangjeli (yellow card) 66'	Stadium: Laçi Stadium; Attendance: 150; Referee: Kridens Meta

16 October 2015 7	Skënderbeu Korçë	2–2	Teuta Durrës	Korçë
18:00 CET	Salihi 1'; Progni (yellow card) 15'; Olayinka 19'	Report	Musta 7' (yellow card) 58'; Dita (yellow card) 9' (goal) 13'; Kotobelli (yellow card) 75'; Lamçja (yellow card) 79'	Stadium: Skënderbeu Stadium; Attendance: 2,000; Referee: Emirjon Sino

25 October 2015 8	Partizani Tirana	2–1	Skënderbeu Korçë	Tirana
19:00 CET	Krasniqi 23'; Ibrahimi 33' (yellow card) 34'; Daja (yellow card) 89'; Račić (yellow card) 90+3'	Report	Salihi 8'; Arapi (yellow card) 37'; Vangjeli (yellow card) 37'; Radas (yellow card) 81'	Stadium: Qemal Stafa Stadium; Attendance: 6,031; Referee: Lorenc Jemini

31 October 2015 9	Skënderbeu Korçë	2–0	Flamurtari Vlorë	Korçë
17:00 CET	Progni (yellow card) 26'; Salihi 58'; Olayinka 90+3'	Report	Halili (yellow card) 12'; Hoxha (yellow card) 70'; Lushtaku (yellow card) 74'	Stadium: Skënderbeu Stadium; Attendance: 2,000; Referee: Andi Koçi

8 November 2015 10	Skënderbeu Korçë	3–1	Vllaznia Shkodër	Korçë
17:00 CET	Salihi 18', 70' (pen.); Shkëmbi (yellow card) 62'; Olayinka 80'	Report	Sosa 11' (yellow card) 67'; Bardulla (yellow card) 47'; Kalaja (yellow card) 60'; Gurishta (yellow card) 64'; Marku (yellow card) 68'	Stadium: Skënderbeu Stadium; Attendance: 1,860; Referee: Bardhyl Pashaj

19 November 2015 11	Kukësi	2–1	Skënderbeu Korçë	Kukës
14:00 CET	Mateus Lima 24', 53'; Mici (yellow card) 65'; Koçi (yellow card) 89'	Report	Shkëmbi (yellow card) 45+1'; Latifi (red card) 65'; Olayinka 75'	Stadium: Zeqir Ymeri Stadium; Attendance: 2,031; Referee: Lorenc Jemini

22 November 2015 12	Skënderbeu Korçë	4–0	Tërbuni Pukë	Korçë
16:00 CET	Salihi 17'; Berisha 19'; Progni 57', 90+1'	Report		Stadium: Skënderbeu Stadium; Attendance: 500; Referee: Blerim Ziri

30 November 2015 13	Tirana	1–2	Skënderbeu Korçë	Tirana
14:00 CET	Bakaj 76' (pen.); Karabeci (yellow card) 77'; Teqja (yellow card) 79'; Lika (yellow card) 89'	Report	Salihi 4'; Vangjeli (yellow card) 66'; Lilaj 71'	Stadium: Selman Stërmasi Stadium; Attendance: 7,000; Referee: Enea Jorgji

3 December 2015 14	Skënderbeu Korçë	4–0	Bylis Ballsh	Korçë
17:00 CET	Progni 44'; Abazi 63'; Berisha 79'; Salihi 90+1'	Report	Basriu (yellow card) 37'; Adekunle (yellow card) 79'	Stadium: Skënderbeu Stadium; Attendance: 2,500; Referee: Klajdi Kola

6 December 2015 15	Skënderbeu Korçë	4–0	Laçi	Korçë
16:00 CET	Vangjeli (yellow card) 20'; Olayinka 25'; Salihi 32', 73'; Berisha 60'	Report	Sefgjinaj (yellow card) 35'; Kruja (yellow card) 51'	Stadium: Skënderbeu Stadium; Attendance: 2,200; Referee: Olsi Sokoli

13 December 2015 16	Teuta Durrës	0–1	Skënderbeu Korçë	Durrës
17:00 CET		Report	Arapi (yellow card) 31'; Berisha (yellow card) 56' (yellow-red card) 60'; Salihi 67'	Stadium: Niko Dovana Stadium; Attendance: 1,200; Referee: Remzi Sadiku

19 December 2015 17	Skënderbeu Korçë	1–0	Partizani Tirana	Korçë
16:00 CET	Olayinka 12'; Progni (yellow card) 45'; Radas (yellow card) 61'; Arapi (yellow card) 62'; Vangjeli (yellow card) 77'; Latifi (yellow card) 80'	Report	Bicaj (yellow card) 5'; Mazrekaj (yellow card) 42'; Sukaj (red card) 78'	Stadium: Skënderbeu Stadium; Attendance: 4,200; Referee: Andi Koçi

23 December 2015 18	Flamurtari Vlorë	3–1	Skënderbeu Korçë	Vlorë
17:00 CET	Lena 26'; Maxhuni (yellow card) 30'; Shehaj (yellow card) 44'; Greca 58' (yellow card) 90+2'; Hoxha (yellow card) 78'	Report	Olayinka 53'; Djair (yellow card) 63'; Ademir (yellow card) 81'	Stadium: Flamurtari Stadium; Attendance: 2,500; Referee: Kridens Meta

30 January 2016 19	Vllaznia Shkodër	1–0	Skënderbeu Korçë	Shkodër
14:00 CET	Krymi (yellow card) 19'; Kalaja 66'; Sefa (yellow card) 89'	Report	Jashanica (yellow card) 55'	Stadium: Reshit Rusi Stadium; Attendance: 600; Referee: Enea Jorgji

7 February 2016 20	Skënderbeu Korçë	3–1	Kukësi	Korçë
13:00 CET	Salihi 10', 71'; Radas (yellow card) 29' (yellow-red card) 90'; Arapi (yellow card) 54'; Nimaga (yellow card) 62'	Report	Memini (yellow card) 27'; Hasani (yellow card) 40'; Dvorneković 58'; Malota (yellow card) 60'	Stadium: Skënderbeu Stadium; Attendance: 0 Referee: Laver Alla
Note: The match was played behind closed doors.

13 February 2016 21	Tërbuni Pukë	1–3	Skënderbeu Korçë	Tirana
13:00 CET	Fangaj (yellow card) 16'; Beci (yellow card) 82'; Jovanović 90'	Report	Salihi 11', 62'; Progni (yellow card) 32'; Osmani (yellow card) 39'; Renatinho 84'	Stadium: Qemal Stafa Stadium; Attendance: 300; Referee: Remzi Sadiku
Note: The match was held at Qemal Stafa Stadium due to inclement weather in Pukë.

22 February 2016 22	Skënderbeu Korçë	1–0	Tirana	Korçë
18:00 CET	Vangjeli (yellow card) 38'; Progni (yellow card) 58'; Salihi 77' (pen.); Arapi (yellow card) 87'	Report	Kërçiku (yellow card) 49'; Gërçaliu (yellow card) 52'	Stadium: Skënderbeu Stadium; Attendance: 3,850; Referee: Andi Koçi

28 February 2016 23	Bylis Ballsh	1–1	Skënderbeu Korçë	Ballsh
14:00 CET	Izuchukwuka 25' (pen.); Peposhi (yellow card) 28'; Simić (yellow card) 60'; Gava (yellow card) 73'; Sahiti (yellow card) 73'; Frashëri (yellow card) 82'	Report	Jashanica (red card) 24'; Salihi 82' (pen.)	Stadium: Adush Muça Stadium; Attendance: 800; Referee: Klajdi Kola

5 March 2016 24	Laçi	0–2	Skënderbeu Korçë	Laç
14:00 CET	Gjoni (yellow card) 50'; Malindi (yellow card) 59'; Dosti (yellow card) 69'	Report	Progni 34'; Salihi (yellow card) 48' (goal) 64'	Stadium: Laçi Stadium; Attendance: 500; Referee: Olsi Sokoli

9 March 2016 25	Skënderbeu Korçë	1–0	Teuta Durrës	Korçë
17:00 CET	Latifi 7'; Vangjeli (yellow card) 55'	Report	Shkalla (yellow card) 18'; Lukić (yellow card) 56'	Stadium: Skënderbeu Stadium; Attendance: 2,000; Referee: Kridens Meta

14 March 2016 26	Partizani Tirana	1–1	Skënderbeu Korçë	Tirana
19:00 CET	Račić 20' (yellow card) 21'; Batha (yellow card) 79'	Report	Abazi (yellow card) 37'; Orelesi (yellow card) 39'; Vangjeli (yellow card) 48' (goal) 88'; Esquerdinha (yellow card) 78'; Osmani (yellow card) 79' (yellow-red card) 89'	Stadium: Qemal Stafa Stadium; Attendance: 4,500; Referee: Enea Jorgji

20 March 2016 27	Skënderbeu Korçë	5–1	Flamurtari Vlorë	Korçë
17:00 CET	Radas 13' (yellow card) 31'; Orelesi (yellow card) 31'; Salihi 55', 60' (pen.), 89'; James 75'	Report	Lushtaku 39' (pen.); Krasniqi (yellow card) 47'	Stadium: Skënderbeu Stadium; Attendance: 2,000; Referee: Remzi Sadiku

2 April 2016 28	Skënderbeu Korçë	2–1	Vllaznia Shkodër	Korçë
19:00 CET	Renatinho 14'; Vangjeli (yellow card) 50'; Latifi 65'	Report	Cicmil (yellow card) 44'; Shtubina 73'; Pjeshka (yellow card) 74'	Stadium: Skënderbeu Stadium; Attendance: 1,500; Referee: Laver Alla

10 April 2016 29	Kukësi	1–0	Skënderbeu Korçë	Kukës
16:00 CET	Malota (yellow card) 12'; Shameti 20'	Report		Stadium: Zeqir Ymeri Stadium; Attendance: 2,500; Referee: Enea Jorgji

16 April 2016 30	Skënderbeu Korçë	2–3	Tërbuni Pukë	Korçë
19:00 CET	Salihi 56'; Plaku 84'	Report	Tasić (yellow card) 10'; Lala 27' (yellow card) 86'; Haxho (yellow card) 90+2'; Karakaçi 90+3'	Stadium: Skënderbeu Stadium; Attendance: 700; Referee: Kreshnik Cjapi

25 April 2016 31	Tirana	0–1	Skënderbeu Korçë	Tirana
14:00 CET	Bakaj (yellow card) 43'; Hoxhallari (yellow card) 73'	Report	Vangjeli (yellow card) 65'; Progni (yellow card) 74'; Hoxhallari 83' (o.g.)	Stadium: Selman Stërmasi Stadium; Attendance: 500; Referee: Bardhyl Pashaj

30 April 2016 32	Skënderbeu Korçë	3–0	Bylis Ballsh	Korçë
19:00 CET	Salihi 27' (pen.); James 33', 72'; Arapi (yellow card) 43'; Vangjeli (yellow card) 57'; Latifi (yellow card) 90+1'	Report	Tairi (yellow card) 12'; Gava (yellow card) 60'	Stadium: Skënderbeu Stadium; Attendance: 1,500; Referee: Eldorjan Hamiti

4 May 2016 33	Skënderbeu Korçë	6–1	Laçi	Korçë
15:30 CET	Abazi 4'; James 11', 16'; Esquerdinha 30', 44'; Salihi 38'	Report	Mustafa 60'	Stadium: Skënderbeu Stadium; Attendance: 400; Referee: Blerim Ziri

8 May 2016 34	Teuta Durrës	1–1	Skënderbeu Korçë	Durrës
19:00 CET	Hila (yellow card) 25'; Lena 61' (pen.); Lukić (yellow card) 69'; Kotobelli (yellow card) 86'	Report	Latifi 34'; Salihi (yellow card) 36'; Osmani (yellow card) 59'; Vangjeli (yellow card) 60'; Lilaj (yellow card) 80'	Stadium: Niko Dovana Stadium; Attendance: 3,000; Referee: Lorenc Jemini

13 May 2016 35	Skënderbeu Korçë	0–1	Partizani Tirana	Korçë
19:00 CET	Salihi (yellow card) 22'; Lilaj (yellow card) 67'; Osmani (yellow card) 83'	Report	Atanda (yellow card) 33'; Kalari (yellow card) 39'; Vila 90'	Stadium: Skënderbeu Stadium; Attendance: 8,000; Referee: Kridens Meta

18 May 2016 36	Flamurtari Vlorë	0–2	Skënderbeu Korçë	Vlorë
17:00 CET	Kuqi (yellow card) 69'	Report	Latifi 8'; Plaku 51'	Stadium: Flamurtari Stadium; Attendance: 3,500; Referee: Enea Jorgji

=== Albanian Cup ===
==== First round ====
6 September 2015 First leg	Tomori Berat	0–3	Skënderbeu Korçë	Durrës
17:00 CET		Report	Abazi 55'; Dema 59', 69'	Stadium: Fusha e Kompleksit Tropikal; Attendance: 30; Referee: Xhulio Mema

9 September 2015 Second leg	Skënderbeu Korçë	2–0 (5–0 agg.)	Tomori Berat	Korçë
14:30 CET	Djair 7'; Esquerdinha 44'	Report	Bitri (yellow card) 59'; Avdo (yellow card) 81'	Stadium: Skënderbeu Stadium; Attendance: 100; Referee: Erald Demiraj

==== Second round ====
12 October 2015 First leg	Sopoti Librazhd	1–1	Skënderbeu Korçë	Pezë
13:30 CET	Çota (yellow card) 15'; Llakaj (yellow card) 35'; Cake (yellow card) 37'; Çaushaj 40'	Report	Osmani (yellow card) 39'; Çupi (yellow card) 48'; Nimaga 87'	Stadium: Internacional Complex; Attendance: 100; Referee: Albano Stolaj

15 November 2015 Second leg	Skënderbeu Korçë	2–0 (3–1 agg.)	Sopoti Librazhd	Korçë
13:00 CET	Salihi 13'; Djair (yellow card) 46'; Progni 53'	Report	Kastrati (yellow card) 26'	Stadium: Skënderbeu Stadium; Attendance: 500; Referee: Elvaldo Durmishi

==== Quarter-finals ====
24 January 2016 First leg	Vllaznia Shkodër	0–0	Skënderbeu Korçë	Shkodër
14:00 CET	Marku (yellow card) 35'; Arbëri (yellow card) 65'; Bardulla (yellow card) 69'	Report	Nimaga (yellow card) 18'; Arapi (yellow card) 50'	Stadium: Reshit Rusi Stadium; Attendance: 1,000; Referee: Andi Koçi

17 February 2016 Second leg	Skënderbeu Korçë	2–1 (2–1 agg.)	Vllaznia Shkodër	Korçë
13:30 CET	Renatinho 42'; Progni (yellow card) 48'; Vangjeli (yellow card) 55'; James 56'; Abazi (yellow card) 62'	Report	Tafili (yellow card) 18'; Vrapi (yellow card) 56'; Marku 88'	Stadium: Skënderbeu Stadium; Attendance: 100; Referee: Bardhyl Pashaj

==== Semi-finals ====
6 April 2016 First leg	Laçi	1–0	Skënderbeu Korçë	Laç
16:00 CET	Çela (yellow card) 20'; Ćetković 50'; Vuthaj (red card) 70'; Veliaj (yellow card) 90+2'	Report	Dema (yellow card) 19'; Lulaj (yellow card) 89'	Stadium: Laçi Stadium; Attendance: 1,200; Referee: Bardhyl Pashaj

20 April 2016 Second leg	Skënderbeu Korçë	2–1 (2–2a agg.)	Laçi	Korçë
15:30 CET	Progni 53'; Plaku 79'	Report	Ćetković 57'	Stadium: Skënderbeu Stadium; Attendance: 400; Referee: Klajdi Kola

=== UEFA Champions League ===
==== Second qualifying round ====
14 July 2015 First leg	Skënderbeu Korçë (Albania)	4–1	(Northern Ireland) Crusaders	Korçë, Albania
20:00 CET	Nimaga 15' (yellow card) 29'; Salihi 34', 83'; Berisha 76'; Radas (yellow card) 90+3'	Report	Owens 48'; Mitchell (yellow card) 59'; Heatley (yellow card) 62'; McClean (yellow card) 78'; Snoddy (yellow card) 90+3'	Stadium: Skënderbeu Stadium; Attendance: 5,500; Referee: Alexander Harkam (Austria)

21 July 2015 Second leg	Crusaders (Northern Ireland)	3–2 (4–6 agg.)	(Albania) Skënderbeu Korçë	Belfast, Northern Ireland
19:45 CET	Burns (yellow card) 11'; McClean (yellow card) 36'; O'Flynn 50'; Coates (yellow card) 61'; Caddell (yellow card) 71'; Snoddy 90+2'; Mitchell 90+3'	Report	Arapi (red card) 11'; Berisha (yellow card) 33' (goal) 69'; Latifi 77'	Stadium: Seaview; Attendance: 1,548; Referee: Christos Nicolaides (Cyprus)

==== Third qualifying round ====
28 July 2015 First leg	Milsami Orhei (Moldova)	0–2	(Albania) Skënderbeu Korçë	Chișinău, Moldova
19:00 CET	Bolohan (yellow card) 57'; Rhaili (yellow card) 68'; Monday (yellow card) 72'; Bud (yellow card) 76'	report	Salihi 49', 73' (pen.)	Stadium: Zimbru Stadium; Attendance: 7,227; Referee: Hüseyin Göçek (Turkey)

5 August 2015 Second leg	Skënderbeu Korçë (Albania)	2–0 (4–0 agg.)	(Moldova) Milsami Orhei	Elbasan, Albania
20:45 CET	Salihi 16'; Esquerdinha (yellow card) 34'; Vangjeli (yellow card) 48'; Progni 55'; Ademir (yellow card) 90+3'	report	Andronic (red card) 14'; Antoniuc (yellow card) 45+1'	Stadium: Elbasan Arena; Attendance: 7,800; Referee: Artur Soares Dias (Portugal)

==== Play-off round ====
19 August 2015 First leg	Skënderbeu Korçë (Albania)	1–2	(Croatia) Dinamo Zagreb	Elbasan, Albania
20:45 CET	Shkëmbi 37'; Vangjeli (yellow card) 48'	Report	Machado (yellow card) 36'; Pjaca (yellow card) 44'; Soudani 66'; Pivarić 90+3'	Stadium: Elbasan Arena; Attendance: 12,163; Referee: Sergei Karasev (Russia)

25 August 2015 Second leg	Dinamo Zagreb (Croatia)	4–1 (2–6 agg.)	(Albania) Skënderbeu Korçë	Zagreb, Croatia
20:45 CET	Soudani 9', 80'; Hodžić 15'; Gonçalo (yellow card) 17' (yellow-red card) 48'; Ćorić (yellow card) 22'; Pivarić (yellow card) 27'; Taravel 55'	Report	Esquerdinha 10'; Berisha (yellow card) 17'; Vangjeli (yellow card) 57'	Stadium: Stadion Maksimir; Attendance: 16,888; Referee: Gianluca Rocchi (Italy)

=== UEFA Europa League ===
==== Group stage ====
Pos	Team	Pld	W	D	L	GF	GA	GD	Pts	Qualification	LMO	SPO	BES	SKE
1	(Russia) Lokomotiv Moscow	6	3	2	1	12	7	+5	11	Advance to knockout phase	—	2–4	1–1	2–0
2	(Portugal) Sporting CP	6	3	1	2	14	11	+3	10	Advance to knockout phase	1–3	—	3–1	5–1
3	(Turkey) Beşiktaş	6	2	3	1	7	6	+1	9		1–1	1–1	—	2–0
4	(Albania) Skënderbeu	6	1	0	5	4	13	−9	3		0–3	3–0	0–1	—

Source: Soccerway
Rules for classification: Group stage tiebreakers

17 September 2015 1	Skënderbeu Korçë (Albania)	0–1	(Turkey) Beşiktaş	Elbasan, Albania
21:05 CET	Berisha (yellow card) 35'; Olayinka (yellow card) 45'	Report	Frei (yellow card) 24'; Sosa 28'; Gómez (yellow card) 90+5'	Stadium: Elbasan Arena; Attendance: 5,482; Referee: Tamás Bognár (Hungary)

1 October 2015 2	Lokomotiv Moscow (Russia)	2–0	(Albania) Skënderbeu Korçë	Moscow, Russia
19:00 CET	Niasse 35'; Logashov (yellow card) 71'; Samedov 73'	Report	Berisha (yellow card) 44'	Stadium: Lokomotiv Stadium; Attendance: 10,340; Referee: Orel Grinfeld (Israel)

22 October 2015 3	Sporting CP (Portugal)	5–1	(Albania) Skënderbeu Korçë	Lisbon, Portugal
19:00 CET	Esgaio (yellow card) 32'; Aquilani 38' (pen.); Montero 41' (pen.); M. Pereira 64', 77'; Figueiredo 69'; Carvalho (yellow card) 88'	Report	Salihi (yellow card) 13' (yellow-red card) 24'; Vangjeli (yellow card) 17'; Progni (yellow card) 51'; Jashanica 89'	Stadium: Estádio José Alvalade; Attendance: 20,567; Referee: Clayton Pisani (Malta)

5 November 2015 4	Skënderbeu Korçë (Albania)	3–0	(Portugal) Sporting CP	Elbasan, Albania
21:05 CET	Lilaj 15', 19' (pen.); Nimaga 55'; Vangjeli (yellow card) 70'	Report	Patrício (red card) 17'; Adrien (yellow card) 33'; Silva (yellow card) 40'; Figueiredo (yellow card) 84'; Mário (yellow card) 90+4'	Stadium: Elbasan Arena; Attendance: 1,783; Referee: Kristo Tohver (Estonia)

26 November 2015 5	Beşiktaş (Turkey)	2–0	(Albania) Skënderbeu Korçë	Istanbul, Turkey
19:00 CET	Tosun 35', 78'	Report	Lilaj (yellow card) 41'; Vangjeli (yellow card) 63'	Stadium: Atatürk Olympic Stadium; Attendance: 11,155; Referee: Paweł Gil (Poland)

10 December 2015 6	Skënderbeu Korçë (Albania)	0–3	(Russia) Lokomotiv Moscow	Elbasan, Albania
21:05 CET	Olayinka (yellow card) 32'	Report	Shishkin (yellow card) 5'; Tarasov 18' (yellow card) 50'; Samedov (yellow card) 36' (goal) 90'; Niasse (yellow card) 77' (goal) 89'	Stadium: Elbasan Arena; Attendance: 1,152; Referee: Marijo Strahonja (Croatia)
