= 2013 Albanian Supercup =

- Event: Albanian Supercup
| Skënderbeu Korçë | KF Laçi |
| 1 | 1 |
- Skënderbeu Korçë won 4–3 on penalties
- Date: August 18, 2013
- Venue: Qemal Stafa Stadium, Tirana
- Referee: Enea Jorgji
- Attendance: 2,500
- Weather: dry

The 2013 Albanian Supercup was the 20th edition of the Albanian Supercup since its establishment in 1989. The match was contested between the 2012–13 Albanian Cup winners KF Laçi and the 2012–13 Albanian Superliga champions Skënderbeu Korçë.

The cup was won by Skënderbeu Korçë after penalties (4–3), since regular and extra time ended in a 1–1 draw. This was the first Supercup trophy for Skënderbeu Korçë, after losing the 2011 and 2012 Sueprcups to KF Tirana.

== Details ==
18 August 2013
19:00

| Skënderbeu Korçë | 1–1 (a.e.t.) | Laçi |
|---|---|---|
| Pejić 6' | Report | Buljan 90+3' |
Penalties
| Fagu (penalty scored); Shehi (penalty scored); Ademir (penalty missed); Pejić (penalty scored); Radas (penalty scored) | 4–3 | (penalty scored) Teqja; (penalty scored) Veliaj; (penalty scored) Buljan; (penalty missed) Zefi; (penalty missed) Bakaj |

Qemal Stafa Stadium, Tirana
Attendance: 2,500
Referee: Enea Jorgji

| GK | 1 | (Albania) Orges Shehi |
| DF | 3 | (Albania) Renato Arapi | (yellow card) 43' | (substituted off) 83' |
| DF | 4 | (Albania) Endrit Vrapi |
| DF | 33 | (Croatia) Marko Radas | (yellow card) 95' |
| DF | 20 | (Brazil) Ademir Ribeiro | (yellow card) 79' |
| MF | 14 | (Kosovo) Leonit Abazi |
| MF | 88 | (Albania) Sabien Lilaj | (yellow card) 63' |
| MF | 8 | (Nigeria) Nurudeen Orelesi | (yellow card) 74' (yellow-red card) 95' |
| MF | 17 | (Albania) Gjergji Muzaka | | (substituted off) 97' |
| FW | 9 | (Albania) Mario Morina | | (substituted off) 73' |
| FW | 22 | (Croatia) Pero Pejić | (yellow card) 90' |
Substitutes:
| GK | 12 | (Albania) Erjon Llapanji |
| DF | 15 | (Albania) Ditmar Bicaj | | (substituted on) 83' |
| DF | 7 | (Albania) Erbim Fagu | | (substituted on) 97' |
| DF | 78 | (Serbia) Ivan Gvozdenović |
| MF | 19 | (Mali) Bakary Nimaga |
| MF | 23 | (Croatia) Željko Tomić |
| FW | 30 | (Albania) Andi Ribaj | | (substituted on) 73' |
Manager:
(Albania) Mirel Josa

| GK | 31 | (Albania) Edvan Bakaj |
| DF | 11 | (Albania) Taulant Sefgjinaj | (yellow card) 119' |
| DF | 4 | (Croatia) Stipe Buljan | (yellow card) 93' |
| DF | 5 | (Albania) Henri Ndreka |
| DF | 17 | (Nigeria) Charles Ofoyen | (red card) 71' |
| MF | 18 | (Albania) Emiliano Veliaj |
| MF | 21 | (Albania) Olsi Teqja |
| MF | 9 | (Albania) Erjon Vucaj |
| MF | 22 | (Albania) Alfred Zefi | (yellow card) 20' |
| MF | 6 | (Albania) Sajmir Kastrati | | (substituted off) 70' |
| FW | 19 | (Albania) Valdan Nimani | | (substituted off) 73' |
Substitutes:
| GK | 1 | (Albania) Ervin Llani |
| DF | 2 | (Albania) Jetmir Nina | | (substituted on) 91' |
| DF | 33 | (Albania) Sadush Danaj |
| MF | 7 | (Albania) Elio Shazivari | | (substituted on) 73' |
| MF | 16 | (Albania) Daniel Jubani |
| FW | 13 | (Albania) Arber Haliti | | (substituted on) 70' (substituted off) 91' |
| FW | 15 | (Albania) Spartak Ajazi |
Manager:
(Albania) Stavri Nica

== See also ==
- 2012–13 Albanian Superliga
- 2012–13 Albanian Cup
