= Gentian Selmani =

Albanian footballer (born 1998)

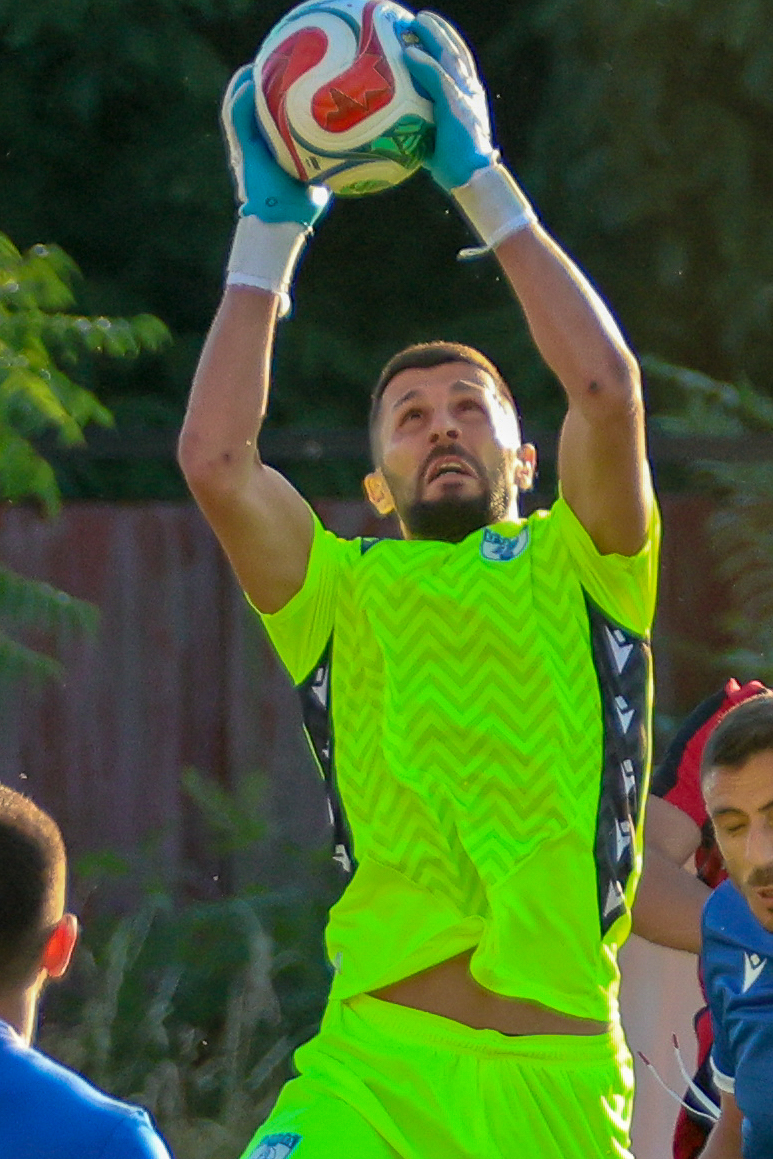

Personal information
- Date of birth: 9 March 1998 (age 28)
- Place of birth: Krujë, Albania
- Height: 1.86 m (6 ft 1 in)
- Position: Goalkeeper

Team information
- Current team: Teuta
- Number: 1

Youth career
- 2002–2014: Partizani
- 2011–2013: → Olimpic (loan)

Senior career*
Years	Team	Apps	(Gls)
2014–2015	Kastrioti	14	(0)
2015–2019	Laçi	118	(1)
2019–2021	Menemenspor	50	(0)
2021–2023	Boluspor	45	(0)
2023	Laçi	17	(0)
2023–2025	Tirana	40	(0)
2025–	Teuta	36	(0)

International career^{‡}
2014	Albania U17	1	(0)
2014–2016	Albania U19	3	(0)
2017–2020	Albania U21	17	(1)
2021–	Albania	4	(0)
- * Club domestic league appearances and goals as of 13 May 2026 ‡ National team caps and goals as of 28 April 2023

Gentian Selmani (born 9 March 1998) is an Albanian professional footballer who plays as a goalkeeper for Albanian club Teuta.

== Club career ==
=== Early career ===
Selmani began playing football as a young child and was coached by former Albania national team goalkeeper Perlat Musta at Partizani from the age of just 5. He joined the Olimpic youth setup in 2011, where he remained for two years before returning to Partizani in 2013 where he joined the under-17 side as a 15-year-old. After impressive performances for the under-17s he was invited by the head coach Shpëtim Duro to train with the first team during the 2014–15 season and he was an unused substitute in the Kategoria Superiore for a home game against Kukësi on 23 November 2014. This, however, proved to be the closest Selmani got to first team action for the club as he left only months later.

=== Kastrioti ===
He joined Kategoria e Parë side Kastrioti in January 2015 and immediately established himself as the club's first choice goalkeeper, making his professional debut on 7 February 2015 in an away game against Iliria that his side lost 1–0. In total he made 14 league appearances during the second half of the season, as his side finished 5th and safely avoided relegation. After establishing himself as a first choice keeper at the age of 16, he attracted the interest of Kategoria Superiore sides and left Kastrioti at the end of the 2014–15 season in order to search for a new club in the top flight.

=== Laçi ===
On 1 August 2015, Selmani completed a transfer to Kategoria Superiore side Laçi for an undisclosed fee. Priror to that, he had travelled to Germany where he had been training with the goalkeeping team at Bundesliga side Augsburg.

He was given squad number 1, and made his debut eleven days later in the Albanian Supercup against Albanian champions Skënderbeu where Laçi won after penalty shoot-out. His decisive save versus Bruno Lulaj made Laçi lift their first ever trophy. Selmani played his first Kategoria Superiore match on 21 August in the opening match of 2015–16 season, conceding a free-kick in the second half as Laçi begun their campaign with a draw. He played another match, before making way for veteran Miroslav Vujadinović, returning in the lineup only in December, keeping his first clean-sheet in the 4–0 home win versus bottom side Tërbuni.

Selmani became the starting keeper in the second part of the season, finishing it with 19 league appearances, keeping 5 clean-sheets as Laçi retained their top flight status. He also played 7 matches in team's run in cup, including the final against Kukësi where Laçi was defeated on penalty shoot-out.

Selmani's spot as regular keeper became permanent in the 2016–17 season, in which he played 33 league matches out of 36 with Laçi escaping relegation in the final matchday at the expense of Tirana. He kept 15 clean-sheets throughout the season, and was ranked 5th in the clean-sheet list. He played his first match as skipper on 1 February 2017 in a cup match versus Skënderbeu, receiving the armband in the 60th minute following the substitution of Erjon Vucaj. He set the record by becoming the youngest ever captain of Laçi. His 50th Kategoria Superiore appearance occurred later 11 May 2017 in the goalless draw versus his ex side Partizani.

In the 2017–18 season, Selmani played 31 league appearances as Laçi finished fourth to return to UEFA Europa League after three years. He became the permanent captain in the second part of the season. In March 2018, he suffered a muscular injury which kept him sidelined for a month, returning to action on 22 April in the draw against Kukësi. Selmani played 5 cup matches as Laçi lost the final again, this time at the hands of Skënderbeu. At the end of the season, Selmani was named as one of the talents of the season by association "Sporti na bashkon".

Selmani made his 100th Kategoria Superiore appearance in a 2–1 win over Tirana on 15 December 2018. Later, on 11 February, he scored his first goal in club level, netting a late penalty kick in a 2–1 away defeat at Skënderbeu.

=== Spells in Turkey ===
In August 2019, Selmani joined Turkish side Menemenspor in the TFF First League, inking a two-year contract.

In January 2021, Selmani signed with fellow First League side Boluspor.

=== Laçi return ===
On 1 February 2023, Selmani made a surprise return to Laçi by signing a deal until the end of 2022–23 season.

=== Tirana ===
On 6 June 2023, Tirana signed with Selmani on a one-year contract.

== International career ==
=== Under-17 ===
Selmani was called up by Albania national under-17 football team coach Džemal Mustedanagić to participate in the 2015 UEFA European Under-17 Championship qualifying round on match-dates 8–13 October 2014. He debuted in international level for Albania U17 in the closing group match against San Marino U17 by playing the full 80-minutes match which finished in a 5–1 victory but anyway were not enough as Albania U17 were eliminated since the second match as they lost both first group matches. For two other matches, Selmani was an unused substitute as a second choice behind the PAOK FC academy goalkeeper Jorgo Muça.

=== Under-19 ===
He advanced higherly at international level as he was called up in Albania national under-19 football team by coach Altin Lala for the double Friendly matches against Bosnia and Herzegovina U19 on 21 & 23 April 2015. Selmani was called up by the newly appointed coach of Albania U19, Arjan Bellaj, for two last friendly matches before the competitive tournament start against Kosovo U19 on 13 & 15 October 2015. His impressive form shown in friendly matches convinced the coach Arjan Bellaj to include him in the squad to participate in the 2016 UEFA European Under-19 Championship qualification from 12 to 17 November 2015. In the opening match against Austria U19, Albania U19 played with Elhan Kastrati as a first choice in a 2–1 loss. Selmani played the full 90-minutes match in the second match-day against Georgia U19 but lost against 1–0. For the closing match against Wales U19 Selmani was an unused substitute in a 3–2 win which resulted an elimination from the tournament for Albania U19 as they were ranked in the 3rd out 4 place collecting 1 win, 2 losses and a total of 4-5 goals collected.

=== Under-21 ===
Following his arrival at Laçi and his games there as a starter, Selmani was called up in Albania national under-21 football team by coach Redi Jupi for the 2017 UEFA European Under-21 Championship qualification matches against Israel & Portugal on 3 & 8 September 2015 as an alternative 3rd choice, after two regular national members Thomas Strakosha & Aldo Teqja. He wasn't included in the 18-man squad who participated in both qualifying matches.

He was re-invited at the national under-21 side by a new coach Alban Bushi for a double friendly match against Moldova U21 on 25 & 27 March 2017.

Selmani was called up for the Friendly match against France U21 on 5 June 2017 and the 2019 UEFA European Under-21 Championship qualification opening match against Estonia U21 on 12 June 2017. He made his competitive debut for Albania U21 against Estonia U21 on 12 June 2017 playing the full 90-minutes match and kept the clean-sheet by making several notable saves to help his side to take a goalless draw.

He received his first call up for the Albania under-20 side by same coach of the under-21 team Alban Bushi for the friendly match against Georgia U20 on 14 November 2017.

Selmani scored his first professional goal on 8 June 2018 by netting in the 93rd minute in a friendly versus Belarus, preventing his side from losing.

In total, earned 17 caps for the under-21 team from 2017 to 2020, and scored one goal.

=== Senior ===
On 25 May 2018, Selmani received an urgent call-up from Albania for the friendly matches against Kosovo and Ukraine, to replace the injured Thomas Strakosha. He made his debut for the senior team on 5 June 2021 in a friendly against Wales, he played the full game and kept the clean sheet in a 0–0 draw.

== Personal life ==
Selmani is a fan of Italian club Juventus and his favourite footballer is goalkeeper Gianluigi Buffon.

== Career statistics ==
=== Club ===
As of 11 February 2019

Club statistics
Club	Season	League			Cup		Europe		Other		Total	
Club	Season	Division	Apps	Goals	Apps	Goals	Apps	Goals	Apps	Goals	Apps	Goals
Partizani	2014–15	Kategoria Superiore	0	0	—		—		—		0	0
Kastrioti	2014–15	Kategoria e Parë	14	0	—		—		—		14	0
Laçi	2015–16	Kategoria Superiore	19	0	7	0	—		1 (Note: All appearance(s) in Albanian Supercup)	0	27	0
Laçi	2016–17	Kategoria Superiore	33	0	3	0	—		—		36	0
Laçi	2017–18	Kategoria Superiore	31	0	5	0	—		—		36	0
Laçi	2018–19	Kategoria Superiore	21	1	1	0	4 (Note: All appearance(s) in UEFA Europa League)	0	1	0	27	1
Laçi	Total		104	0	16	0	4	0	2	0	126	1
Career total			118	0	16	0	4	0	2	0	140	1

== Honours ==
=== Club ===
Laçi

- Albanian Cup Runner-up: 2015–16
- Albanian Supercup: 2015
