= Blendi =

- Gender: Male

Origin
- Region of origin: Albania

Blendi is a predominantly Albanian language masculine given name. Notable people bearing the name Blendi include:

- Blendi Baftiu (born 1998), Kosovan footballer
- Blendi Fevziu (born 1969), Albanian journalist, writer and TV host
- Blendi Idrizi (born 1998), Kosovan footballer
- Blendi Klosi (born 1971), Albanian politician
- Blendi Nallbani (born 1971), Albanian footballer
