= 2015 Albanian Supercup =

Skënderbeu Korçë	Laçi
2	2
- Laçi won 8–7 on penalties
- Date: 12 August 2015
- Venue: Qemal Stafa Stadium, Tirana
- Referee: Andi Koçi
- Attendance: 500
- Weather: Clear; 25 °C (77 °F)

The 2015 Albanian Supercup was the 22nd edition of the Albanian Supercup, an annual Albanian football match played between the winner of the previous season's Albanian Superliga and the winner of the Albanian Cup. The match was contested by KF Skënderbeu Korçë, champions of the 2014–15 Albanian Superliga, and KF Laçi, the 2014–15 Albanian Cup winners.

It was held at the Qemal Stafa Stadium on 12 August 2015. The game was watched by 2,200 spectators and was broadcast through DigitAlb's SuperSport Albania.

The match was tied 2-2 after extra time, and KF Laçi won the match 8–7 on penalties. It was Laçi's first Supercup win.

== Details ==
12 August 2015
20:00 CET

Skënderbeu Korçë	2–2 (a.e.t.)	Laçi
Salihi 65', 74'	Report	Adeniyi 11' (pen.), 51'
Penalties
	7–8

Qemal Stafa Stadium, Tirana
Attendance: 500
Referee: Andi Koçi

Skënderbeu	Laçi

GK	12	(Albania) Erjon Llapanji
RB	20	(Brazil) Ademir
CB	4	(Albania) Bruno Lulaj
CB	3	(Albania) Renato Arapi (c)
LB	11	(Albania) Leonit Abazi
CM	6	(Albania) Bekim Dema	(yellow card) 67'
CM	25	(Albania) Bujar Shabani
LM	23	(Albania) Bernard Berisha		(substituted off) 77'
RM	7	(Albania) Gerhard Progni
ST	17	(Bulgaria) Ventsislav Hristov		(substituted off) 82'
ST	21	(Albania) Arbër Abilaliaj		(substituted off) 28'
Substitutes:
GK	1	(Albania) Orges Shehi
MF	10	(Albania) Bledi Shkëmbi		(substituted on) 77'
MF	88	(Albania) Sabien Lilaj		(substituted on) 77'
FW	14	(Albania) Hamdi Salihi		(substituted on) 28'
Manager:
(Albania) Mirel Josa

GK	1	(Albania) Gentian Selmani
RB	2	(Albania) Elton Doku
CB	3	(Albania) Emiliano Çela
CB	11	(Albania) Taulant Sefgjinaj	(yellow card) 16'
LF	4	(Croatia) Stipe Buljan (c)	(yellow card) 95'
CM	28	(Albania) Emiljano Veliaj
CM	18	(Albania) Agim Meto		(substituted off) 72'
CM	7	(Albania) Olsi Gocaj
CM	14	(Albania) Argjend Mustafa
CF	9	(Albania) Aldo Mitraj		(substituted off) 68'
CF	8	(Nigeria) Segun Adeniyi		(substituted off) 76'
Substitutes:
GK	31	(Montenegro) Miroslav Vujadinović
DF	19	(Albania) Valdan Nimani		(substituted on) 68'
MF	6	(Albania) Mikelanxhelo Bardhi		(substituted on) 72'
MF	16	(Albania) Edison Ndreca		(substituted on) 76'
Manager:
(Albania) Armando Cungu

Match officials:

- Assistant referees:
  - Ilir Tartari
  - Dojando Myftari
- Fourth official: Kreshnik Cjapi (Albania)

Match rules

- 90 minutes
- 30 minutes extra-time if the scores still level
- Penalty shoot-out if scores still level
- Six named substitutes, of which three may be used

== See also ==
- 2014–15 Albanian Superliga
- 2014–15 Albanian Cup
