= Ventsislav Hristov =

Bulgarian footballer

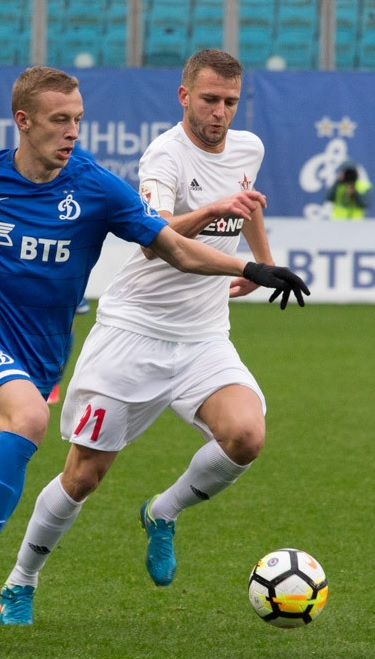
- Hristov (R) with SKA-Khabarovsk in 2017

Personal information
- Full name: Ventsislav Dimitrov Hristov
- Date of birth: 9 November 1988 (age 38)
- Place of birth: Sofia, Bulgaria
- Height: 1.79 m (5 ft 10 in)
- Position: Forward

Youth career
- Lokomotiv Sofia

Senior career*
| Years | Team | Apps | (Gls) |
| 2006–2007 | Lokomotiv Sofia | 1 | (0) |
| 2007–2008 | Sportist Svoge | 20 | (4) |
| 2008–2010 | Nesebar | 36 | (7) |
| 2010–2011 | Montana | 30 | (6) |
| 2011–2012 | Chernomorets Burgas | 38 | (10) |
| 2013–2015 | Beroe Stara Zagora | 51 | (17) |
| 2014 | → Metalurh Donetsk (loan) | 4 | (0) |
| 2015 | Rijeka | 6 | (2) |
| 2015 | → Skënderbeu Korçë (loan) | 4 | (1) |
| 2016 | Levski Sofia | 19 | (8) |
| 2016–2017 | Neftochimic Burgas | 15 | (4) |
| 2017–2018 | SKA-Khabarovsk | 12 | (2) |
| 2018 | Vereya | 8 | (2) |
| 2018–2019 | Arda Kardzhali | 24 | (12) |
| 2019 | Tsarsko Selo | 11 | (0) |
| 2020 | Concordia Chiajna | 3 | (0) |
| 2020 | Slavia Sofia | 1 | (0) |
| 2021 | Neftochimic Burgas | 8 | (0) |
| 2021 | Sozopol | 7 | (2) |
| 2022 | Tsarsko Selo | 13 | (6) |
| 2022–2023 | Botev Vratsa | 13 | (1) |
| 2023–2024 | Nesebar | 11 | (0) |
| 2025–2026 | Rilski Sportist Samokov | | |

International career
| 2013–2016 | Bulgaria | 8 | (1) |
- * Club domestic league appearances and goals

Ventsislav Hristov (Bulgarian: Венцислав Христов; born 9 November 1988) is a Bulgarian former professional footballer who played as a forward.

== Personal life ==
Hristov was born in Sofia to a Bulgarian father and a Ukrainian mother. He began playing football at an early age with local side Lokomotiv Sofia and spent several years developing in the club's youth academy.

== Club career ==
=== Early career ===
After progressing through the Lokomotiv youth system, Hristov was promoted to the first team squad for the 2006–07 season and plays in one match, coming as a substitute. He then played for Sportist Svoge and Nesebar in the Bulgarian B Group.

=== Montana ===
In June 2010, Hristov joined Montana. On 1 August 2010, he made his debut in a 1–0 home loss against Lokomotiv Sofia. Hristov made 30 appearances during the 2010–11 season, finishing with 6 goals. He also made 5 assists.

=== Chernomorets Burgas ===
On 15 June 2011, Hristov joined Chernomorets Burgas. He marked his league debut for Chernomorets with a winning goal, scoring the only in a 1–0 win over Kaliakra Kavarna on 6 August.

In January 2013, Hristov terminated his contract with Chernomorets.

=== Beroe Stara Zagora ===
On 15 January 2013, Beroe Stara Zagora confirmed they had signed Hristov on a two-and-a-half-year contract. He made his debut in a 0–0 away draw against Botev Vratsa on 2 March, playing the full 90 minutes. On 16 March, he scored his first goal for Beroe in a 2–0 win against Etar 1924.

On 10 July, Hristov scored the opening goal in the 2013 Bulgarian Supercup final against Ludogorets Razgrad. Ludogorets subsequently equalised, but Beroe still won the game through penalty shootout. On 18 July, Hristov netted Beroe's only goal in their 4–1 home loss against Hapoel Tel Aviv in the second qualifying round of Europa League. Hristov scored the second goal in Beroe's 2–0 win over Slavia Sofia in the first round of 2013–14 A PFG season on 22 July.

==== Metalurh Donetsk (loan) ====
In the beginning of 2014, Hristov was close to being transferred to CSKA Sofia, but eventually joined Metalurh Donetsk on loan for the rest of the season due to the precarious financial situation of CSKA. He made his debut for Metalurh in a 3–1 home loss against Volyn Lutsk on 29 March, coming on as a substitute for Vasileios Pliatsikas.

=== Return to Beroe Stara Zagora ===
Hristov returned to Beroe at the end of the season having made only 4 appearances for Metalurh Donetsk in the Ukrainian Premier League. On 16 August 2014, in a 2–0 away victory over Slavia Sofia, he netted his first goal of the season and assisted Salim Kerkar. On 13 September, Hristov scored his first-ever hat-trick in Beroe's 4–0 home win over Marek Dupnitsa. A week later, he scored his 6th goal in the last five games in a 3–0 away win against Lokomotiv Plovdiv.

=== Rijeka ===
On 23 January, Hristov signed a 2 1/2-year deal with Croatian side HNK Rijeka for an undisclosed fee.

=== Levski Sofia ===
On 3 February 2016, Hristov signed with PFC Levski Sofia until the end of the season after his contract with HNK Rijeka was terminated. His first goal for the club came in a game against PFC Lokomotiv Plovdiv. He scored again in the following fixture against PFC Pirin Blagoevgrad. He continued his fine form with consecutive goals in the games against PFC Beroe Stara Zagora and PFC Botev Plovdiv and a hat-trick in a league game against PFC Cherno More Varna bringing his total to 7 goals in his first 10 games making him PFC Levski Sofia top goalscorer for the current season.

=== SKA-Khabarovsk ===
On 5 August 2017, Hristov signed a one-year contract with Russian Premier League side SKA-Khabarovsk. He was released from his SKA contract by mutual consent on 1 February 2018.

=== Arda ===
On 1 July 2018, Hristov signed with Second League club Arda Kardzhali for 2+1 years.

=== Tsarsko Selo ===
Hristov had a stint with Tsarsko Selo in the autumn of 2019.

=== Botev Vratsa ===
In July 2022 he joined Botev Vratsa.

== International career ==
On 8 August 2013, Hristov was called up to the Bulgaria national team by manager Lyuboslav Penev for a friendly match against Macedonia on 14 August. He came on as a substitute for Ivelin Popov in the 55th minute. Hristov made his first start on 15 October 2013, in a 0–1 home loss against the Czech Republic in a World Cup qualifier. He was replaced by Simeon Slavchev in the 73rd minute. He scored his first goal for the national team against Azerbaijan in the EURO 2016 qualifying game, scoring the winning goal in the 88th minute.

== Career statistics ==
=== Club ===
As of 21 April 2019

Appearances and goals by club, season and competition
| Club | Season | League | | | Cup | | Continental | | Other | | Total | |
| Club | Season | Division | Apps | Goals | Apps | Goals | Apps | Goals | Apps | Goals | Apps | Goals |
|---|---|---|---|---|---|---|---|---|---|---|---|---|
| Sportist Svoge | 2007–08 | B Group | 20 | 4 | 0 | 0 | – | | – | | 20 | 4 |
| Nesebar | 2008–09 | B Group | 13 | 3 | 0 | 0 | – | | – | | 13 | 3 |
| Nesebar | 2009–10 | B Group | 23 | 4 | 2 | 1 | – | | – | | 25 | 5 |
| Montana | 2010–11 | A Group | 30 | 6 | 1 | 0 | – | | – | | 31 | 6 |
| Chernomorets Burgas | 2011–12 | A Group | 24 | 5 | 2 | 0 | – | | – | | 26 | 5 |
| Chernomorets Burgas | 2012–13 | A Group | 14 | 5 | 1 | 0 | – | | – | | 15 | 5 |
| Beroe Stara Zagora | 2012–13 | A Group | 10 | 3 | 3 | 0 | – | | – | | 13 | 3 |
| Beroe Stara Zagora | 2013–14 | A Group | 23 | 8 | 3 | 1 | 2 | 1 | 1 | 1 | 29 | 11 |
| Beroe Stara Zagora | 2014–15 | A Group | 18 | 6 | 1 | 0 | – | | – | | 19 | 6 |
| Metalurh Donetsk (loan) | 2013–14 | Ukrainian Premier League | 4 | 0 | 0 | 0 | – | | – | | 4 | 0 |
| Rijeka | 2014–15 | Prva HNL | 6 | 2 | 1 | 0 | – | | – | | 7 | 2 |
| Skënderbeu Korçë (loan) | 2015–16 | Albanian Superliga | 4 | 1 | 0 | 0 | 4 | 0 | 1 (Note: One appearance in Albanian Supercup) | 0 | 9 | 1 |
| Levski Sofia | 2015–16 | A Group | 15 | 8 | 0 | 0 | – | | – | | 15 | 8 |
| Levski Sofia | 2016–17 | Bulgarian First League | 4 | 0 | 0 | 0 | 2 | 0 | – | | 6 | 0 |
| Neftochimic Burgas | 2016–17 | Bulgaria First League | 15 | 4 | 0 | 0 | – | | – | | 15 | 4 |
| SKA-Khabarovsk | 2017–18 | Russian Premier League | 12 | 2 | 2 | 0 | – | | – | | 14 | 2 |
| Vereya | 2017–18 | Bulgaria First League | 8 | 2 | 0 | 0 | – | | – | | 8 | 2 |
| Arda | 2018–19 | Bulgarian Second League | 21 | 10 | 1 | 0 | – | | – | | 22 | 10 |
| Career total | | | 264 | 73 | 17 | 2 | 8 | 1 | 2 | 1 | 291 | 77 |

=== International goals ===
Scores and results lists Bulgaria's goals first

| No | Date | Venue | Opponent | Score | Result | Competition |
|---|---|---|---|---|---|---|
| 1 | 9 September 2014 | Bakcell Arena, Baku, Azerbaijan | Azerbaijan | 1–2 | 1–2 | Euro 2016 qualification |

== Honours ==
Beroe

- Bulgarian Cup: 2012–13
- Bulgarian Supercup: 2013
