= Erli Çupi =

Albanian footballer

Personal information
- Date of birth: 3 February 1997 (age 29)
- Place of birth: Bulqizë, Albania
- Height: 1.85 m (6 ft 1 in)
- Position: Winger

Team information
- Current team: Ferizaj

Youth career
- 2011–2012: Olimpic
- 2012–2014: Tirana
- 2014–2015: A.F Dinamo
- 2015–2016: Skënderbeu

Senior career*
Years	Team	Apps	(Gls)
2015–2016	Skënderbeu	0	(0)
2016–2017	Başakşehir U-21	24	(5)
2017–	Kukësi B	16	(0)
2017–2018	Kukësi	0	(0)
2018–	Ferizaj		

International career^{‡}
2017–	Albania U21	0	(0)
- * Club domestic league appearances and goals as of 13 December 2017 ‡ National team caps and goals as of 21:51, 15 May 2017 (UTC)

Erli Çupi (born 3 February 1997) is an Albanian professional footballer who plays as a winger for Kosovan club Ferizaj and the Albania national under-21 football team.

== Club career ==
=== Early career ===
Çupi started his youth career with Olimpic at age of 14. After spending 1 season here, he moved at KF Tirana. Then in November 2014 he moved to A.F Dinamo where he played until the end of the season. In 2015 he signed with Skënderbeu Korçë.

On 14 October 2016 he was signed by Turkish side İstanbul Başakşehir F.K. for the U21 team in the A2 Ligi. Following his arrival, he immediately established himself as a starter under coach İsmail Demirci playing 24 matches and scoring also 5 goals.

In October 2017, Çupi returned to Albania joining FK Kukësi. He played initially for the Kukësi's B-team in the 2017–18 Albanian Second Division and in November gained the first team managed by Mladen Milinković.

== International career ==
Çupi received his first international call up at the Albania national under-21 football team by coach Alban Bushi for a gathering between 14 and 17 May 2017 with most of the players selected from Albanian championships.

== Career statistics ==
=== Club ===
As of 13 December 2017

Club statistics
Club	Season	League			Cup		Europe (Note: Including continental competitions, such as UEFA Champions League and UEFA Europa League)		Other (Note: Including other competitions, such as Albanian Supercup)		Total	
Club	Season	Division	Apps	Goals	Apps	Goals	Apps	Goals	Apps	Goals	Apps	Goals
Skënderbeu Korçë	2015–16	Albanian Superliga	0	0	2	0	—		—		2	0
İstanbul Başakşehir U21	2016–17	A2 Ligi	24	5	—		—		—		24	5
Kukësi B	2017–18	Albanian Second Division	16	0	—		—		—		16	0
Kukësi	2017–18	Albanian Superliga	—		1	0	—		—		1	0
Career total			40	5	3	0	—		—		43	5
