= Djair (footballer, born 1991) =

Brazilian footballer

Personal information
- Full name: Djair Veiga Francisco Junior
- Date of birth: 10 February 1991 (age 35)
- Place of birth: Barretos, Brazil
- Height: 1.72 m (5 ft 8 in)
- Position: Central midfielder

Team information
- Current team: Desportivo Brasil

Youth career
- 2006–2008: Figueirense
- 2008–2010: Internacional
- 2010–2011: Coritiba

Senior career*
Years	Team	Apps	(Gls)
2011–2014	Coritiba	2	(0)
2012–2013	→ Joinville (loan)	8	(0)
2013–2014	→ ASA (loan)	10	(0)
2014–2015	Catanduvense	0	(0)
2015	Tombense	0	(0)
2015	Atlético Tubarão	0	(0)
2015	Skënderbeu	3	(0)
2016–2017	Marist FC		
2018	Mamoré	0	(0)
2018	Desportivo Brasil	0	(0)
2019	Cascavel CR	0	(0)
2019	Almirante Barroso	0	(0)
2020–	Desportivo Brasil	0	(0)
- * Club domestic league appearances and goals as of 11:33, 16 September 2020 (UTC)

Djair Veiga Francisco Junior (born 10 February 1991), commonly known as Djair, is a Brazilian association footballer who plays as a central midfielder for Apucarana Sports. Djair has played in the Série A, as well as the Europa League.
