= Francesco Pigoni =

Italian footballer

Personal information
- Full name: Francesco Pigoni
- Date of birth: 29 March 1986 (age 40)
- Place of birth: Scandiano, Italy
- Height: 1.77 m (5 ft 10 in)
- Position: Right back

Youth career
- –2005: Bologna

Senior career*
Years	Team	Apps	(Gls)
2005–2008	Castellarano		
2008–2010	Rodengo Saiano		
2010–2012	Pro Vercelli		
2012	Savona	9	(0)
2012–2013	KF Tirana	7	(0)
- * Club domestic league appearances and goals

Francesco Pigoni (born 29 March 1986) is an Italian footballer who last played for KF Tirana.
