= Arbër Abilaliaj =

Albanian footballer

Personal information
- Date of birth: 6 June 1986 (age 40)
- Place of birth: Vlorë, Albania
- Height: 1.85 m (6 ft 1 in)
- Position: Forward

Youth career
- 2000–2002: Flamurtari

Senior career*
Years	Team	Apps	(Gls)
2002–2004	Flamurtari	21	(2)
2004–2008	Partizani	84	(24)
2008–2009	Besa	21	(4)
2009–2010	Tirana	25	(6)
2010–2012	Inter Zaprešić	38	(10)
2012–2013	Tirana	14	(2)
2013–2015	Flamurtari	47	(17)
2015–2016	Skënderbeu	0	(0)

International career
2001–2002	Albania U17	8	(4)
2003–2004	Albania U19	6	(2)
2005–2008	Albania U21	3	(2)

Managerial career
- 2020: Tirana U-21 (caretaker)
- 2021: Tirana U-21
- 2023: Partizani
- 2025: Partizani
- * Club domestic league appearances and goals

Arbër Abilaliaj (born 6 June 1986) is an Albanian football coach and a former player who played as a forward.

== Club career ==
=== Partizani Tirana ===
Abilaliaj previously played for Partizani Tirana, where he appeared as the club lost in the UEFA Intertoto Cup 2006 first round to Ethnikos Achna FC, despite scoring a goal in the second leg. While at Partizani, Abilaliaj had unsuccessful trials at FC Erzgebirge Aue and TuS Koblenz.

=== Tirana ===
Abilaliaj announced his departure from Besa Kavajë and later signed a one-year deal with the reigning champions Tirana for the 2009–10 season. His made his Tirana debut on 15 July in the first leg of Champions League first qualifying round against Stabæk, entering in the field as an 85th-minute substitute in an eventual 1–1 home draw. In the returning leg, he played in the second half as the team were crashed 4–0 and was eliminated with the 5–1 aggregate.

He made his domestic debut in the 2009 Albanian Supercup on 16 August, a 1–0 home win to Flamurtari Vlorë, in which he played full-90 minutes and scored the winning goal in the 72nd minute, giving the club its 8 Albanian Supercup title. Abilaliaj played as a started in team's opening league match of the season, a 3–1 home defeat to Flamurtari Vlorë, in which he scored his team's only goal. In the matchday 3 against Gramozi Ersekë, Abilaliaj was again in the scoresheet, scoring the only goal of the match to give Tirana another three important points.

Abilaliaj played a total of 31 matches in all competitions, scoring 8 goals. He finished the league with 6 goals as Tirana was not able to retain its Albanian Superliga title.

=== Return to Tirana ===
On 7 August 2012, Abilaliaj returned to Tirana by signing a one-year contract, and was given the vacant number 21 for the upcoming 2012–13 season. He made his league debut for the club on 22 September 2012 during the 1–0 away win over Luftëtari Gjirokastër, appearing as a 75th-minute substitute for Mirel Çota. On 21 November, he scored a hat-trick against Otranto during the friendly match valid for the Independence Cup.

Later on 23 February of the following year, Abilaliaj scored his first league goal for Tirana during the 1–1 tie against Teuta Durrës; he netted the goal in 72nd minute exactly two minutes after entering in the field. On 31 March, he scored his second league goal of the season during the 3–0 defeat of Kastrioti Krujë, heading home a Fatmir Hysenbelliu cross.

Following the end of the season, where Tirana ended in 5th place, Abilaliaj left the team after failing to cement his place at starting lineup, ending the season with 17 appearances between league and cup, scoring twice in the process.

=== Flamurtari Vlorë ===
On 26 August 2013, Abilaliaj signed a one-year deal with Flamurtari Vlorë, returning in his boyhood club after nine years.

He made his return debut with the club on 6 November during the 2–0 win over Gramshi in Albanian Cup. In his first league appearance four days later against Lushnja, Abilaliaj came in a second-half substitute and scored a crucial goal in 91st minute to help his team to win the match 4–3.

Two weeks later, Abilaliaj scored his third goal of the season during the 3–1 home defeat of Vllaznia Shkodër. On 22 February of the following year, Abilaliaj scored his first goal of 2014 during the 3–2 away lose to Kukësi, heading home a Gilman Lika cross in the 85th minute. Following the end of the match, Abilaliaj was sent immediately to the nearest hospital in Kukës after he had an abdomen problem, accompanied by vomiting. However, following the treatment from the doctors, he returned with the team to travel back to Vlorë.

He continued with his solid appearances even in Albanian Cup, netting a winner against Vllaznia Shkodër in the Quarter-final's second leg, sending Flamurtari Vlorë into the semi-finals with the aggregate 1–0. Following that, Abilaliaj scored his first brace of the season during the 2–4 away win over Lushnja, taking his tally up to five league goals, helping the club to win for the first time in Lushnje after 27 years.

With the arrival of new head coach Stanislav Levý on 15 June 2015, Abilaliaj was not in his plans and was allowed to leave the club, which Abilaliaj himself officially announced on 17 June.

=== Skënderbeu Korçë ===
He joined Albanian Superliga champions Skënderbeu Korçë shortly after leaving Flamurtari Vlorë, and he joined the rest of the squad at their pre season training camp in Flachau, Austria.

== International career ==
He was part of the Albania national football team during the 2008 UEFA European Cup qualifications, but he did not made a debut.

== Career statistics ==
As of 18 June 2015

Club	Season	League			Cup		Continental		Other		Total	
Club	Season	Division	Apps	Goals	Apps	Goals	Apps	Goals	Apps	Goals	Apps	Goals
Flamurtari Vlorë	2001–02	Albanian Superliga	11	0	0	0	—		—		11	0
Flamurtari Vlorë	2002–03	Albanian Superliga	11	2	0	0	—		—		11	2
Flamurtari Vlorë	Total		22	2	0	0	—		—		22	2
Partizani Tirana	2004–05	Albanian Superliga	23	1	0	0	—		—		23	1
Partizani Tirana	2005–06	Albanian Superliga	23	8	2	2	—		—		25	10
Partizani Tirana	2006–07	Albanian Superliga	31	7	0	0	2 (Note: All appearance(s) in UEFA Intertoto Cup)	1	—		33	8
Partizani Tirana	2007–08	Albanian Superliga	29	6	1	1	—		—		30	7
Partizani Tirana	Total		106	22	3	3	2	1	—		111	26
Besa Kavajë	2008–09	Albanian Superliga	21	3	5	2	—		—		26	5
Besa Kavajë	Total		21	3	5	2	—		—		26	5
Tirana	2009–10	Albanian Superliga	25	6	3	1	2 (Note: All appearance(s) in UEFA Champions League)	0	1 (Note: Appearance in Albanian Supercup)	1	31	8
Tirana	Total		25	6	3	1	2	0	1	1	31	8
Inter Zaprešić	2001–02	Prva HNL	24	2	0	0	—		—		24	2
Inter Zaprešić	2002–03	Prva HNL	18	5	1	0	—		—		19	5
Inter Zaprešić	Total		42	7	1	0	—		—		47	7
Tirana	2012–13	Albanian Superliga	14	2	3	0	0	0	0	0	17	2
Tirana	Total		14	2	3	0	0	0	0	0	17	2
Flamurtari Vlorë	2013–14	Albanian Superliga	20	12	6	2	—		—		26	14
Flamurtari Vlorë	2014–15	Albanian Superliga	28	5	3	0	3 (Note: All appearance(s) in UEFA Europa League)	0	1	0	35	5
Flamurtari Vlorë	Total		48	17	9	2	3	0	1	0	61	19
Skënderbeu Korçë	2015–16	Albanian Superliga	0	0	1	0	2	0	1	0	4	0
Skënderbeu Korçë	Total		0	0	1	0	2	0	1	0	4	0
Career total			278	59	25	8	9	1	3	1	319	69

== Honours ==
=== Club ===
Partizani Tirana

- Albanian Superliga: Runner-up 2007–08

Tirana

- Albanian Supercup (2): 2009, 2012

Flamurtari Vlorë

- Albanian Cup (1): 2013–14
- Albanian Supercup: Runner-up 2014

Skënderbeu Korçë

- Albanian Supercup: Runner-up 2015
- Albanian Superliga (1): 2015–16
