= Miroslav Vujadinović =

Montenegrin footballer (born 1983)

Personal information
- Full name: Miroslav Vujadinović
- Date of birth: 22 April 1983 (age 43)
- Place of birth: Titograd, SFR Yugoslavia
- Height: 1.92 m (6 ft 4 in)
- Position: Goalkeeper

Youth career
- 2000–2002: Budućnost

Senior career*
Years	Team	Apps	(Gls)
2002–2010	Budućnost	100	(0)
2010–2014	Vllaznia	104	(0)
2014–2016	Laçi	50	(0)
2016–2017	Korabi	20	(0)

International career
2005–2006	Serbia & Montenegro U21	3	(0)
- * Club domestic league appearances and goals as of 18 October 2020

Miroslav Vujadinović (Serbian Cyrillic: Мирослав Вујадиновић; born 22 April 1983) is a Montenegrin retired footballer who last played as a goalkeeper for Albanian club Korabi Peshkopi in the Albanian Superliga.

== Club career ==
=== Vllaznia Shkodër ===
In May 2012, Vujadinović signed contract extension with Vllaznia Shkodër.

=== Laçi ===
On 3 June 2015, Vujadinović agreed a contract extension with Laçi, singing until June 2016.

On 19 July 2016, Vujadinović announced his departure from the club along with several players, ending his Laçi career with 65 appearances in all competitions, winning two trophies.

=== Korabi Peshkopi ===
On 27 July 2016, Vujadinović completed a transfer to newly promoted side Korabi Peshkopi, signing a contract for the upcoming season.

== International career ==
Vujadinović has been a former Serbia & Montenegro U21 player, making three competitive appearances between 2005 and 2006.

== Honours ==
Laçi

- Albanian Cup: 2014–15
- Albanian Supercup: 2015
