= Antonio Marku =

Albanian footballer

Personal information
- Date of birth: 24 March 1992 (age 34)
- Place of birth: Shkodër, Albania
- Height: 1.84 m (6 ft 1/2 in)
- Position: Left back

Team information
- Current team: Ferizaj

Youth career
- 2005–2010: Vllaznia

Senior career*
| Years | Team | Apps | (Gls) |
| 2010–2012 | Dinamo Tirana | 25 | (1) |
| 2012–2013 | Laçi | 7 | (0) |
| 2013 | Vllaznia | 9 | (0) |
| 2013 | Kukësi | 1 | (0) |
| 2014–2019 | Vllaznia | 91 | (3) |
| 2019–2020 | Drenica | 0 | (0) |
| 2020–???? | Vëllaznimi | | |
| 2025– | Ferizaj | | |

International career
| 2010–2011 | Albania U19 | 3 | (0) |
| 2011–2013 | Albania U21 | 3 | (0) |
- * Club domestic league appearances and goals as of 30 June 2025

Antonio Marku (born 24 March 1992) is an Albanian footballer who plays as a left back for Ferizaj in Kosovo.

== Career ==
=== Early career ===
Marku began playing football with the youth teams of his local team Vllaznia Shkodër but in 2010 due to his university studies he moved to Tirana, where he began playing for Dinamo Tirana. He was part of the Dinamo Tirana U-19 side for the 2010–11 season where he was the team captain.

Marku made his professional debut against Flamurtari Vlorë on 20 April 2011 in a 6–2 loss, coming on as a substitute in the 57th minute for Nurudeen Orelesi. He was then promoted to the starting line-up for the 2011–12 season because of Dinamo's extreme financial difficulties which resulted in nearly all of the senior players to leave the club in the summer. In the summer of 2013 he joined FK Kukësi.

=== Vllaznia Shkodër ===
On 24 January 2016, during the first leg of the quarter-finals of the 2015–16 Albanian Cup against Skënderbeu Korçë, Marku suffered a head-to-head collision with Skënderbeu's Ademir, forcing him to leave the field with a stretcher and was immediately sent to the nearest hospital along with Ademir.

=== Drenica ===
On 17 August 2019 Marku announced on his Facebook profile, that he had joined KF Drenica in Kosovo.

== Career statistics ==
=== Club ===
As of 26 January 2016

| Club | Season | League | | | Cup (Note: Including cup competitions, such as Albanian Cup) | | Continental (Note: Including continental competitions, such as UEFA Champions League and UEFA Europa League) | | Other (Note: Including other competitions, such as Albanian Supercup) | | Total | |
| Club | Season | Division | Apps | Goals | Apps | Goals | Apps | Goals | Apps | Goals | Apps | Goals |
|---|---|---|---|---|---|---|---|---|---|---|---|---|
| Dinamo | 2010–11 | Albanian Superliga | 1 | 0 | — | | — | | — | | 1 | 0 |
| Dinamo | 2011–12 | Albanian Superliga | 24 | 1 | 0 | 0 | — | | — | | 24 | 1 |
| Dinamo | Total | | 25 | 1 | 0 | 0 | — | | — | | 25 | 1 |
| Laçi | 2012–13 | Albanian Superliga | 7 | 0 | 5 | 0 | — | | — | | 12 | 0 |
| Laçi | Total | | 7 | 0 | 5 | 0 | — | | — | | 12 | 0 |
| Vllaznia | 2012–13 | Albanian Superliga | 9 | 0 | — | | — | | — | | 9 | 0 |
| Vllaznia | Total | | 9 | 0 | — | | — | | — | | 9 | 0 |
| Kukësi | 2013–14 | Albanian Superliga | 1 | 0 | 2 | 0 | — | | — | | 3 | 0 |
| Kukësi | Total | | 1 | 0 | 2 | 0 | — | | — | | 3 | 0 |
| Vllaznia | 2013–14 | Albanian Superliga | 2 | 0 | 0 | 0 | — | | — | | 2 | 0 |
| Vllaznia | 2014–15 | Albanian Superliga | 16 | 1 | 2 | 0 | — | | — | | 18 | 1 |
| Vllaznia | 2015–16 | Albanian Superliga | 35 | 1 | 4 | 1 | — | | — | | 39 | 2 |
| Vllaznia | Total | | 53 | 2 | 6 | 1 | — | | — | | 40 | 1 |
| Career total | | | 95 | 3 | 13 | 1 | 0 | 0 | 0 | 0 | 108 | 4 |
