= Elton Muçollari =

Albanian footballer

Personal information
- Full name: Elton Muçollari
- Date of birth: 14 September 1980 (age 46)
- Place of birth: Tirana, Albania
- Height: 1.85 m (6 ft 1 in)
- Position: Midfielder

Senior career*
Years	Team	Apps	(Gls)
2006–2008	Laçi	31	(2)
2008–2010	Teuta	52	(2)
2010–2012	Kastrioti	53	(6)
2012–2013	Tirana	15	(1)
2014–2015	Besëlidhja	16	(0)
2015–2016	Korabi	25	(1)
2016–2017	Sopoti	24	(0)
2017–2018	Vora	13	(2)

Managerial career
- 2023–: KF Tirana (Assistant manager)
- * Club domestic league appearances and goals as of 2016

Elton Muçollari (born 14 September 1980) is an Albanian retired footballer who played several seasons in the Albanian Superliga.

== Career stats ==
Club performance			League		Cup		Continental		Total	
Season	Club	League	Apps	Goals	Apps	Goals	Apps	Goals	Apps	Goals
Albania			League		Albanian Cup		Europe		Total	
2008-09	Shkumbini Peqin	Albanian Superliga	18	2	4	0	0	0	22	2
2009-10	Shkumbini Peqin	Albanian Superliga	2	0	0	0	0	0	2	0
2009-10	Skënderbeu Korçë	Albanian Superliga	2	0	0	0	0	0	2	0
2010-11	Kastrioti Krujë	Albanian Superliga	31	4	0	0	0	0	31	4
2011-12	Kastrioti Krujë	Albanian Superliga	22	2	12	1	0	0	34	3
2012-13	KF Tirana	Albanian Superliga	0	0	0	0	0	0	0	0
