= Luko Biskup =

Croatian footballer

Personal information
- Date of birth: 14 June 1981 (age 45)
- Place of birth: Dubrovnik, SFR Yugoslavia
- Height: 1.81 m (5 ft 11 1/2 in)
- Position: Defensive midfielder

Senior career*
Years	Team	Apps	(Gls)
2001–2002	AC Mestre		
2002–2005	NK Zagreb	40	(0)
2005–2006	Hrvatski Dragovoljac	15	(2)
2006–2008	Inter Zaprešić	23	(2)
2008–2010	Vinogradar	41	(3)
2010–2012	Skënderbeu	43	(2)
2012–2013	Kukësi	20	(2)
- * Club domestic league appearances and goals

Luko Biskup (born 14 June 1981) is a Croatian former footballer who played as a defensive midfielder.

== Club career ==
Biskup, born in Dubrovnik, SFR Yugoslavia, started his career in 2001 with AC Mestre. A year later, he switched to NK Zagreb, and made 40 league appearances, before switching to Hrvatski Dragovoljac in 2005. After making 15 league appearances for Hrvatski Dragovoljac, he switched to Inter Zaprešić in 2006, making 23 league appearances in a two-year spell at the club. In 2008, he joined NK Vinogradar, making 41 league appearances, before switching to Skënderbeu Korçë in 2010. Having made 43 league appearances for Skënderbeu Korçë, he joined current club KS Kukësi in 2012.

== Honours ==
Skënderbeu Korçë

- Albanian Superliga (2): 2010-11 2011-12
