= Mikelanxhelo Bardhi =

Albanian footballer (born 1995)

Personal information
- Full name: Mikelanxhelo Bardhi
- Date of birth: 8 January 1995 (age 31)
- Place of birth: Krujë, Albania
- Position: Attacking midfielder

Youth career
- –2011: Iliria
- 2013–2014: Partizani

Senior career*
Years	Team	Apps	(Gls)
2011–2013	Iliria	38	(1)
2013–2014	Partizani	0	(0)
2014–2015	Laçi	18	(0)
2016–2018	Iliria	57	(11)

International career
2009–2010	Albania U-15	2	(0)
2011–2012	Albania U-17	6	(0)
2013–2014	Albania U-19	2	(0)
- * Club domestic league appearances and goals as of 30 December 2018

Mikelanxhelo 'Michelangelo' Bardhi (born 8 January 1995 in Krujë) is an Albanian football player who most recently played for Iliria Fushë-Krujë in the Albanian First Division as a midfielder.

== Honours ==
KF Laçi

- Albanian Cup (1): 2014–15
