= Ervin Llani =

Albanian footballer

Personal information
- Full name: Ervin Llani
- Date of birth: 24 April 1983 (age 43)
- Place of birth: Tirana, Albania
- Position: Goalkeeper

Senior career*
| Years | Team | Apps | (Gls) |
| 2001–2003 | Besëlidhja | 9 | (0) |
| 2003–2004 | Vllaznia | 0 | (0) |
| 2004–2005 | Lushnja | 21 | (0) |
| 2005–2009 | Shkumbini | 121 | (0) |
| 2009–2010 | Laçi | 33 | (0) |
| 2010–2011 | Elbasani | 28 | (0) |
| 2011–2013 | Tomori | 44 | (0) |
| 2013–2017 | Laçi | 10 | (0) |

International career^{‡}
| 2004–2006 | Albania U-21 | 15 | (0) |
| 2010 | Albania | 1 | (0) |
- * Club domestic league appearances and goals as of 26 February 2014 ‡ National team caps and goals as of 10 September 2010

Ervin Llani (born 24 April 1983) is an Albanian retired footballer who last played as a goalkeeper for KF Laçi in the Albanian Superliga.

== International career ==
He made his debut for Albania in a June 2010 friendly match against Andorra in Tirana, coming on as a sub for the last seconds of the match for Isli Hidi. These proved to be his only international moments of fame.
