= Elio Shazivari =

Albanian footballer

Personal information
- Date of birth: 14 April 1985 (age 41)
- Place of birth: Tirana, Albania
- Height: 1.87 m (6 ft 2 in)
- Position: Midfielder

Youth career
- –2008: Skënderbeu Korçë

Senior career*
Years	Team	Apps	(Gls)
2005–2008	Laçi		
2008–2009	Shkumbini		
2009–2012	Laçi	108	(6)
2014	Elbasani	22	(2)
2015	Dinamo Tirana	14	(2)
2015-2016	Korabi	27	(1)
2016	Dinamo Tirana	12	(0)
2017	Sopoti	12	(1)
- * Club domestic league appearances and goals

Elio Shazivari (born 14 April 1985) is an Albanian retired footballer who last played as a midfielder for Sopoti Librazhd in the Albanian First Division.
