= Henri Ndreka =

Albanian footballer

Personal information
- Full name: Henri Ndreka
- Date of birth: 27 March 1983 (age 43)
- Place of birth: Lezhë, Albania
- Height: 1.93 m (6 ft 4 in)
- Position: Defender

Youth career
- 2000–2001: Besëlidhja

Senior career*
Years	Team	Apps	(Gls)
2001–2005	Partizani	113	(13)
2005–2006	Vllaznia	22	(1)
2006–2007	Partizani	16	(0)
2007–2008	Kryvbas Kryvyi Rih	25	(0)
2008–2010	Teuta	25	(0)
2010–2011	Besëlidhja		
2011	Kamza	12	(1)
2012	Burreli	12	(1)
2012–2014	Laçi	24	(1)

International career^{‡}
2004	Albania	2	(0)
- * Club domestic league appearances and goals as of 19 May 2010 ‡ National team caps and goals as of November 2009

Henri Ndreka (born 27 March 1983 at Lezhë) is an Albanian football defender who finished his career at Laçi.

== Club career ==
He previously played for FC Kryvbas Kryvyi Rih, one of 4 Albanians who played for the Ukrainian club simultaneously.

== International career ==
He made his debut for Albania, coming on as an injury time substitute for Edvin Murati in a March 2004 friendly match against Iceland in Tirana and earned a total of 2 caps, scoring no goals. His other international was an August 2004 friendly away against Cyprus.

=== National team statistics ===
Albania national team
Year	Apps	Goals
2004	2	0
Total	2	0
