= Nurudeen Orelesi =

Nigerian footballer

Personal information
- Full name: Nurudeen Adegbola Orelesi
- Date of birth: 10 April 1989 (age 37)
- Place of birth: Lagos, Nigeria
- Height: 1.79 m (5 ft 10 in)
- Position: Defensive midfielder

Team information
- Current team: Apolonia
- Number: 21

Youth career
- Bolowotan FC
- –2006: First Bank
- 2006–2007: Salamanca
- 2007–2008: Bonifika

Senior career*
Years	Team	Apps	(Gls)
2008–2009	Bonifika	1	(0)
2009–2010	ECO Lagos	11	(1)
2010–2011	Dinamo Tirana	26	(0)
2011–2014	Skënderbeu Korçë	66	(3)
2014–2016	Metalurh Zaporizhzhia	31	(1)
2016–2017	Skënderbeu Korçë	48	(0)
2017–2018	Vllaznia Shkodër	30	(0)
2018–2019	Kamza	13	(0)
2022–	Apolonia	53	(0)

International career
2009–2010	Nigeria U20	4	(1)
2011–2012	Nigeria U23	1	(0)
- * Club domestic league appearances and goals as of 1 June 2024

Nurudeen Adegbola Orelesi (born 10 April 1989) is a Nigerian professional footballer who plays as a defensive midfielder for Albanian club Apolonia. He is well known for his powerful and accurate long shots.

== Club career ==
=== Early career ===
Orelesi began his career with First Bank, later joined to UD Salamanca. On 2 October 2007, he left Spain to sign with Slovenian Second League club SC Bonifika, Orelesi played his first season in the reserve team before being promoted to the senior side in July 2008, appearing in three games in his first professional season 2008–09. In September 2009, he signed than for ECO F.C. Lagos.

=== Dinamo Tirana ===
Orelesi joined Albanian champions Dinamo Tirana on 1 August 2010 for a reported fee of €25,000 from ECO Lagos FC, signing a one-year contract with the club holding the option of renewing for an additional year.

=== Skënderbeu Korçë ===
He signed for his second Albanian side, Skënderbeu Korçë on 23 June 2011 on a four-year contract.

=== Metalurh Zaporizhya ===
On 20 August 2014 Orelesi signed for Ukraine club Metalurh Zaporizhya, for a fee of €100,000 from Skënderbeu Korçë. He made his competitive debut on 14 September in the matchday 6 against Volyn, playing full-90 minutes as the team suffered a 3–0 away loss. He scored his maiden goal later on 23 November in a 2–4 home loss to Dynamo Kyiv. During the 2014–15 season, Orelesi made 19 appearances, including 18 as starter, collecting 1539 minutes, as Metalurh finished in a respectable 7th place. He also played two times in Ukrainian Cup, as the team was eliminated in round of 16 to Olimpik Donetsk.

=== Return to Skënderbeu Korçë ===
On 21 January 2016, Orelesi returned to Skënderbeu Korçë for his second spell with the Albanian champions. He was allocated the squad number 80 and during the second part of 2015–16 season he contributed with 15 league appearances, helping the club to win its six consecutive league title, his fourth personal. Skënderbeu did not play European football in the summer of 2016 due to their ban over match-fixing allegations. In league, however, Orelesi was ever-presented, making 33 appearances, including 31 as starter, collecting 2657 minutes as Skënderbeu lost the championship to Kukësi in the penultimate matchday, eventually finishing third after a 2–2 draw against Partizani Tirana in the final match. In cup, Orelesi played in four matches, as Skënderbeu lost in the final to Tirana, a match which Orelesi didn't play.

=== Vllaznia Shkodër ===
On 10 August 2017, Orelesi completed a transfer to fellow Albanian Superliga side Vllaznia Shkodër by penning one-year contract with an option of a further one for an undisclosed fee. Overall, he played 30 league matches as the team was relegated to Albanian First Division for the first time in 60 years.

=== Kamza ===
On 4 August 2018, Kamza announced to have signed Orelesi on a contract running until the end of 2018–19 season.

== International career ==
He represented Nigeria at 2009 FIFA U-20 World Cup in Egypt.

== Career statistics ==
As of 13 May 2018

Club statistics
Club	Season	League			Cup		Continental		Other		Total	
Club	Season	Division	Apps	Goals	Apps	Goals	Apps	Goals	Apps	Goals	Apps	Goals
SC Bonifika	2007–08	Slovenian Second League	0	0	0	0	—		—		0	0
SC Bonifika	2008–09	Slovenian Second League	1	0	1	0	—		—		2	0
SC Bonifika	Total		1	0	1	0	—		—		2	0
ECO Lagos	2009–10	Nigeria National League	11	1	0	0	—		—		11	1
Dinamo Tirana	2010–11	Albanian Superliga	26	0	7	1	0	0	1 (Note: All appearance(s) in Albanian Superliga relegation playoffs)	0	34	1
Skënderbeu Korçë	2011–12	Albanian Superliga	25	1	13	0	2 (Note: All appearance(s) in UEFA Champions League)	0	1 (Note: Appearance in Albanian Supercup)	0	41	1
Skënderbeu Korçë	2012–13	Albanian Superliga	25	2	6	1	2	0	1	0	34	3
Skënderbeu Korçë	2013–14	Albanian Superliga	16	0	3	0	6 (Note: Four appearances and one goal in UEFA Champions League, two in UEFA Europa League)	1	1	0	26	1
Skënderbeu Korçë	2014–15	Albanian Superliga	—		—		2	0	0	0	2	0
Skënderbeu Korçë	Total		66	3	22	1	12	1	3	0	103	5
Metalurh Zaporizhya	2014–15	Ukrainian Premier League	19	1	2	0	—		—		21	1
Metalurh Zaporizhya	2015–16	Ukrainian Premier League	12	0	0	0	—		—		12	0
Metalurh Zaporizhya	Total		31	1	2	2	—		—		33	1
Skënderbeu Korçë	2015–16	Albanian Superliga	15	0	2	0	—		—		17	0
Skënderbeu Korçë	2016–17	Albanian Superliga	33	0	4	0	—		1	0	38	0
Skënderbeu Korçë	Total		48	0	6	0	—		1	0	55	0
Vllaznia Shkodër	2017–18	Albanian Superliga	30	0	4	0	—		—		34	0
Kamza	2018–19	Albanian Superliga	0	0	0	0	—		—		0	0
Career total			213	5	42	2	12	1	5	0	272	8

== Honours ==
Skënderbeu Korçë

- Albanian Superliga: 2011–12, 2012–13, 2013–14, 2015–16
- Albanian Supercup: 2013, 2014
